= 25th Chess Olympiad =

1982 chess tournament in Lucerne, Switzerland

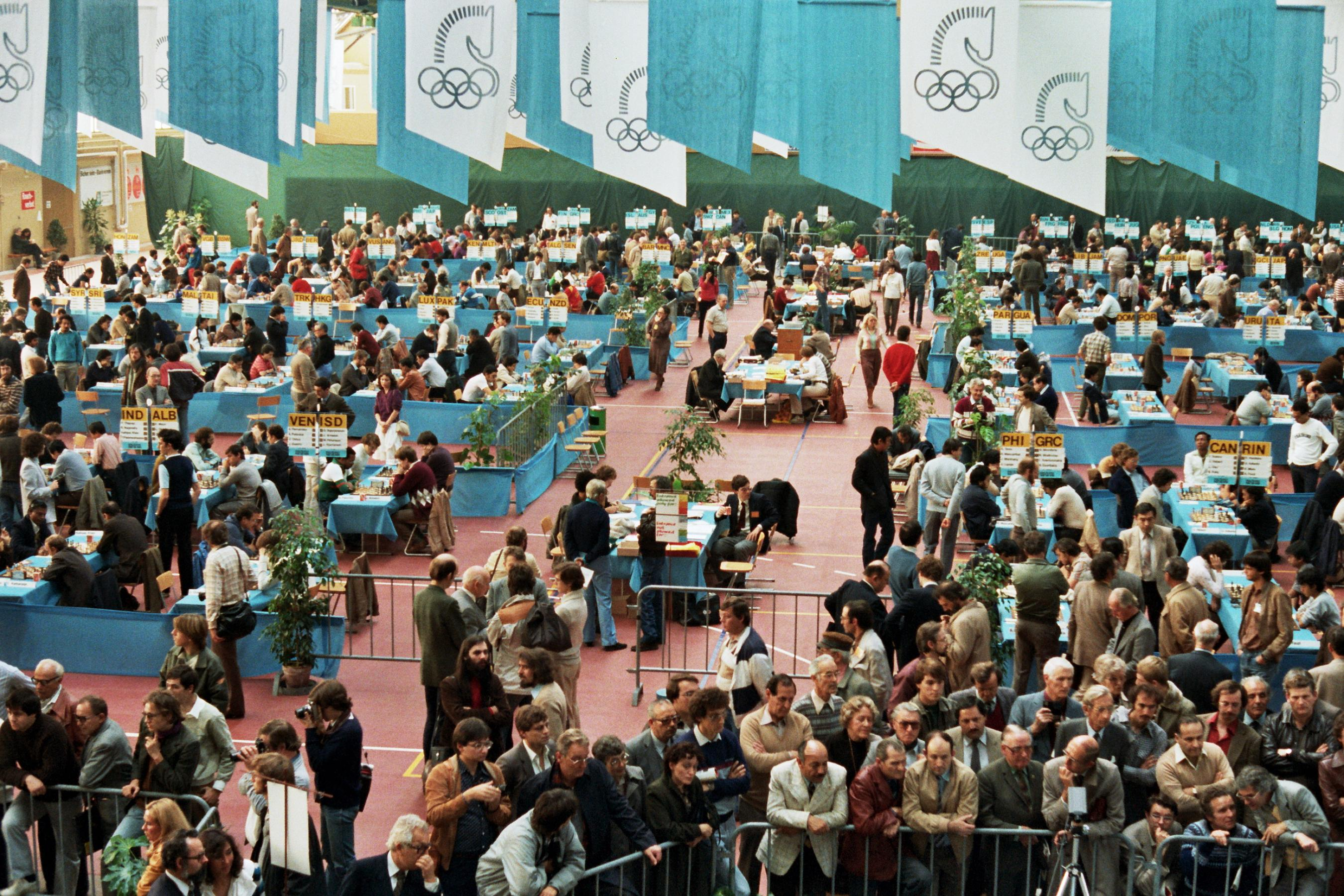
Schacholympiade Luzern 1982

The 25th Chess Olympiad (German: Die 25. Schacholympiade), organized by FIDE and comprising an open and a women's tournament, as well as several other events designed to promote the game of chess, took place between October 29 and November 16, 1982, in Lucerne, Switzerland.

The Soviet team with three world champions (reigning champion Karpov, future champion Kasparov and former champion Tal) were back in their usual form and this time left no doubt about the outcome. In the end, they only drew one match (against the Netherlands; and won the rest) and finished no less than 6½ points ahead of runners-up Czechoslovakia. The United States took the bronze medals.

Off the board, FIDE elected a new president at its congress held concurrently with the Olympiad. Friðrik Ólafsson of Iceland was succeeded by Florencio Campomanes of the Philippines.

== Open event ==
A total of 91 nations played a 14-round Swiss system tournament - 93 had applied, but The Gambia and Mauritania did not arrive. To make for an even number of teams, the Swiss hosts also fielded a "B" team. For the first time, the two British Channel Islands, Guernsey and Jersey, participated with a joint team.

In the event of a draw, the tie-break was decided first by using the Buchholz system, then by match points.

Open event
#	Country	Players	Average rating	Points	Buchholz	MP
1	Soviet Union	Karpov, Kasparov, Polugaevsky, Beliavsky, Tal, Yusupov	2651	42½		
2	Czechoslovakia	Hort, Smejkal, Ftáčnik, Jansa, Plachetka, Ambrož	2539	36		
3	United States	Browne, Seirawan, Alburt, Kavalek, Tarjan, Christiansen	2580	35½		
4	Yugoslavia	Ljubojević, Gligorić, Kovačević, Velimirović, Ivanović, Hulak	2554	35		
5	Hungary	Portisch, Ribli, Sax, Pintér, Csom, Grószpéter	2579	33½	461.5	
6	Bulgaria	Tringov, Radulov, Velikov, Inkiov, Donchev, Popov	2475	33½	431.5	
7	Poland	Sznapik, Schmidt, Kuligowski, Adamski, Bielczyk, Sygulski	2459	33		
8	Denmark	Kristiansen, Mortensen, Fedder, Øst-Hansen, Fries-Nielsen	2433	32½	442.5	
9	Cuba	García González, Nogueiras, Rodríguez Céspedes, Hernández, García Martínez, Vilela	2483	32½	432.5	
10	England	Miles, Nunn, Speelman, Stean, Mestel, Chandler	2561	32	456.5	
11	Argentina	Quinteros, Cámpora, Hase, Rubinetti, Bronstein, Gómez Baillo	2458	32	447.0	
12	Romania	Gheorghiu, Șubă, Ciocâltea, Ghindă, Stoica, Foișor	2488	32	442.0	
13	Israel	Gruenfeld, Murey, Gutman, Birnboim, Greenfeld, Kagan	2475	32	432.0	
14	Austria	Hölzl, Herzog, Wittmann, Danner, Baumgartner	2396	32	421.5	
15	West Germany	Hübner, Unzicker, Pfleger, Lobron, Hecht, Kindermann	2518	31½	456.5	
16	Sweden	Andersson, Schüssler, Karlsson, Schneider, Wedberg, Ornstein	2518	31½	451.0	
17	Netherlands	Timman, Sosonko, Ree, van der Wiel, van der Sterren, Ligterink	2546	31½	448.0	
18	Canada	Ivanov, Suttles, Hébert, Day, Pelts, Berry	2453	31½	441.0	
19	Philippines	Torre, Mascariñas, Maninang, Yap, Cain, Lupian	2428	31½	411.5	
20	Colombia	Zapata, Alzate, Gutierrez, Agudelo, Cuartas, Mendoza	2371	31½	402.5	
21	Chile	Morovic, Frias Pablaza, Cifuentes, Campos Moreno, Salazar Jacob, Abarca Aguirre	2425	31		
22	Australia	Rogers, Jamieson, West, Johansen, Shaw, Hjorth	2355	30½	432.5	
23	Iceland	Sigurjónsson, Árnason, H. Ólafsson, Pétursson, Hjartarson, Jóhannsson	2446	30½	415.0	
24	Norway	Helmers, Heim, Vinje-Gulbrandsen, Agdestein, Bjerke, Hoen	2383	30½	414.0	
25	Finland	Rantanen, Westerinen, Mäki, Binham, Yrjölä, Raaste	2394	30½	398.0	
26	Switzerland	Korchnoi, Hug, Wirthensohn, Partoş, Züger, Franzoni	2479	30	451.0	
27	Indonesia	Ardiansyah, Handoko, Adianto, Miolo, Ginting, Fauzi	2320	30	430.5	
28	Spain	Díez del Corral, Bellón López, Fernández García, Martín González, Sanz Alonso, Ochoa de Echagüen	2425	30	418.5	20
29	France	Haïk, Kouatly, Giffard, Seret, D. Roos, Andruet	2414	30	418.5	17
30	Wales	Williams, Cooper, Jones, Lamford, Cunningham	2310	30	407.5	
31	Ireland	Dunne, Delaney, Short, Doyle, Wallace, Barry	2243	30	398.5	
-	Switzerland "B"	Trepp, Gobet, Bhend, Huss, Kaenel, Vucenovic	2303	30	397.0	
32	Scotland	McKay, McNab, Condie, Upton, Swanson, Bryson	2324	29½	422.5	
33	Greece	Skembris, Skalkotas, Kourkounakis, Gavrilakis, Liverios, Trikaliotis	2343	29½	412.5	
34	Mongolia	Myagmarsuren, Jigjidsüren, Hurelbaatar, Lhagva	2294	29½	409.5	
35	Dominican Republic	Abreu, Liao Yuan Eu, Mateo, Gonzáles, Domínguez, Pérez Nivar	2334	29½	408.5	
36	Venezuela	Fernández, Palacios Lanza, Ostos, Guerra, Urbaneja, Gamboa	2344	29½	399.0	
37	China	Liu Wenzhe, Liang Jinrong, Li Zunian, Ye Jiangchuan, Zhang Weida	2395	29	426.5	
38	Brazil	Sunye Neto, Paolozzi da Cunha, Segal, Trois, Milos, van Riemsdijk	2424	29	412.5	
39	Mexico	Frey, Sisniega, Villarreal, Campos López, Aldrete Lobo	2426	29	409.0	16
40	Albania	Muço, Qendro, Zadrima, Sula, Karkanaqe, Nasto	2285	29	409.0	13
41	India	Thipsay, Ravi Sekhar, Nagendra, N. R. Anil Kumar, Khan, Parameswaran	2390	28½	419.0	
42	Italy	Passerotti, Messa, Arlandi, Sanna, Ceschia, Cocozza	2323	28½	397.0	
43	Singapore	Leow, Wong Meng Kong, Chia Chee Seng, Chan Peng Kong, Tan Chee Keon, Lim Kok Ann	2306	28½	396.5	
44	Uruguay	Rivera Kuzawka, Dienavorian Lacherian, Bauzá Ortiz, Izquierdo Saravia, Wernik Oliva, Escofet Fernández	2218	28½	390.0	
45	New Zealand	Small, Sarapu, Nokes, Dowden, Smith, Stuart	2289	28	412.5	
46	Egypt	Afifi, Fatin, El-Said, Yassin, El-Ghazali, Abdelnabbi	2253	28	393.0	
47	Turkey	Onat, Sel, Durlu, Öney, Süer, Asaturoğlu	2265	28	388.5	
48	Guatemala	Rodas Martini, Juárez Flores, Pérez, Reyes Nájera, Batres, Deras Díaz	2293	28	378.0	17
49	Sri Lanka	D. H. C. Aturupane, Parakrama, Goonetilleke, G. H. A. Aturupane, T. D. R. Peires, Pitigala	2214	28	378.0	14
50	Belgium	Weemaes, Goormachtigh, Defize, De Bruycker, Pergericht, Schumacher	2303	27½	403.5	
51	Portugal	L. Santos, J. P. Santos, Silva, Fernandes, Durão, A. P. Santos	2353	27½	386.5	
52	Paraguay	Franco Ocampos, Gamarra Cáceres, Valiente, Bogda, Santacruz, Sosa Harrison	2294	27½	378.0	
53	Syria	Hakki, Beitar, Houshan, Argha, Hamwieh	2248	27½	375.5	
54	Thailand	Sinprayoon, Trisa-Ard, Chaivichit, Rittiphunyawong, Ruenwongsa, Kavakul	2328	27	390.0	
55	Pakistan	Khan, Farooqui, Hussain, Mohiuddin, Mirza, Zafar	2256	27	387.5	
56	Faroe Islands	Hansen, Apol, Ziska, T. Nielsen, Midjord, Joensen	2200	27	368.5	
57	Malaysia	Liew Chee Meng, Hon Kah Seng, Goh Yoon Wah, Choong Yit Chuan, Quah Seng Sun, A. Annvar Bin Zainal	2226	26½	385.0	
58	Hong Kong	Jhunjhnuwala, Jhunjhnuwala, Luk Luen Wah, Schepel, Lin, Latham	2251	26½	374.0	
59	Lebanon	Sursock, Abouchaaya, El-Khechen, Narchi, Loheac-Ammoun	2211	26½	372.5	
60	Puerto Rico	Falcón, Santa Torres, Martínez Buitrago, Moraza Choisme, Ochoa, Davila Vega	2208	26	383.5	
61	Japan	Takemoto, Nishimura, Matsumoto, Kaya, Yuuki, Shintani	2200	26	365.5	
62	Tunisia	Bouaziz, Kaabi, Graa, Ouechtati, Belkhodja, Zargouni	2240	25½	389.5	
63	Trinidad and Tobago	Tavares, Cecil Lee, Courtney Lee, Duchesne, Ramon-Fortune, Raphael	2204	25½	369.0	
64	Ecuador	Arrata, Vintimilla, Matamoros Franco, Delgado, Yépez Jaramillo, M. Pinoargote	2214	25½	364.5	
65	Algeria	Benhadi, Slimani, Chaourar, Telmoune, Kharchi, Bammoune	2200	25½	363.5	
66	Cyprus	Riza, Martidis, Demetrakis, Avgousti, Schinis	2213	25½	363.0	
67	Andorra	Purgimón, Santamaría Mas, D. Iglesias, Pantebre Martínez, Clua Ballague, De la Casa	2200	25½	362.5	
68	Zimbabwe	Barlow, Glazier, Kuwaza, Levy, Rahman, Kyriakides	2200	25½	360.5	
69	Suriname	Lindeboom, Koenders, Tjongtjinjoe, Hoefdraad, Kuslan, Veer	2200	25½	354.5	
70	Guernsey and Jersey	Blow, Fulton, Knight, Watkins, Cummins	2200	25½	352.0	
71	Papua New Guinea	Rush, Pilapil, Marko, Markov, Baker, Fancy	2200	25½	351.5	
72	Malta	Camilleri, Azzopardi, Lauri, Cilia Vincenti, Sollars, Zaffarese	2205	25½	347.5	
73	United Arab Emirates	M. Saleh, Sharif, Shuhail, N. M. Saleh, Razaq	2200	25½	345.5	
74	Monaco	Girault, Angles d'Auriac, Merqui, Lepine, Lorinczi Retek, Zapuzek	2200	25½	341.5	
75	Nigeria	Caiafas, I. Onime, Agusto, O. Faseyitan	2200	25	367.5	
76	Luxembourg	Feller, Stull, Schammo, Bastian, Wietor, Goerens	2211	25	346.5	
77	Uganda	Kamuhangire, Zabasajja, Zirembuzi, Mpeka, Okoth, Mungyereza	2200	25	334.5	
78	Zaire	De Vries, Vandecastele, Buysschaert, Behrenfelt, Claeys	2200	25	330.5	
79	Libya	Abdulatif, M. Hingary, El-Mejbri, El-Ageli, Amer, El-Gheiadi	2200	24½		
80	Jamaica	Tonsingh, Wheeler, Powell, Ewbank, Matthews	2200	24	364.5	
81	Jordan	Bakr, Bukhari, Battikhi, Zu'bi, Arafat	2200	24	348.0	
82	Senegal	Sakho, Sargos, S. Mbaye, Diop, P. Sakho	2200	24	334.0	
83	British Virgin Islands	Hook, Jarecki, Solomon, Pickering, Walters	2209	23		
84	Honduras	Ustariz, López, Yuja, Luque, Zaldivar, Díaz	2200	22½	325.5	
85	United States Virgin Islands	Van Tilbury, Turner, Chiu Yum San, Grumer, Carty, W. Grolemund	2201	22½	320.5	
86	Bahrain	Faroghi, A. Hamid Khonji, Rashid, Said, K. Mohsin, Al-Khozai	2200	22½	316.0	
87	Angola	Nascimento, de Carvalho, De Meireles, Veloso, Ferreira, Sousa	2200	22	319.5	
88	Kenya	Kanani, Adam, Miheso, Pravinlal Nandlal, Anilkumar Ramanlal	2200	22	289.5	
89	Bermuda	Wojciechowski, Harris, Radford, Tee, Chudleigh, Dill	2200	19½		
90	Botswana	Blackburn, Hamley, Thobosi, Abdulla, Madikwe, Kgatshe	2200	14½	325.0	
91	Zambia	Mwanse, Sikazwe, Salimu, N. Kawanu, Ndlhovu Vuto, Kafumbwe	2200	14½	322.5	

=== Individual medals ===
- Board 1: (Paraguay) Zenón Franco Ocampos 11 / 13 = 84.6%
- Board 2: (Philippines) Rico Mascariñas 7½ / 9 = 83.3%
- Board 3: (Ecuador) Carlos Matamoros Franco 7 / 9 = 77.8%
- Board 4: (Norway) Simen Agdestein 9 / 12 = 75.0%
- 1st reserve: (France) Daniël Roos 9 / 11 = 81.8%
- 2nd reserve: (Papua New Guinea) Stuart Fancy 8 / 9 = 88.9%

== Women's event ==
45 nations were signed up, and to make for an even number of teams, the Swiss hosts also fielded a "B" team. However, the Dominican Republic never showed up, so the competition ended up consisting of an odd 45 teams after all.

In the event of a draw, the tie-break was decided first by using the Buchholz system, then by match points.

Like the open event, the women's tournament was dominated by the Soviet Union, captained by world champion Chiburdanidze, who won the gold medals by a three-point margin. Romania and Hungary took silver and bronze, respectively.

#	Country	Players	Average rating	Points	Buchholz
1	Soviet Union	Chiburdanidze, Alexandria, Gaprindashvili, Ioseliani	2360	33	
2	Romania	Mureșan, Pogorevici, Nuțu-Terescenko, Polihroniade	2297	30	
3	Hungary	Verőci-Petronić, Ivánka, Porubszky-Angyalosine, Csonkics	2205	26	
4	Poland	Ereńska-Radzewska, Brustman, Wiese, Szmacińska	2153	25½	
5	China	Liu Shilan, Wu Mingqian, An Yangfeng	2090	24½	342.5
6	West Germany	Hund, Fischdick, Feustel, Laakmann	2185	24½	340.0
7	Sweden	Cramling, Borisova-Ornstein, Aatolainen, Nyberg	2122	24	
8	Netherlands	Vreeken, Bruinenberg, Belle, van Parreren	2058	23½	321.0
9	India	R. Khadilkar, J. Khadilkar, V. Khadilkar, Thipsay	2007	23½	299.5
10	Spain	García Vicente, García Padrón, Gallego Eraso, Ferrer Lucas	2112	23	341.0
11	England	Miles, Jackson, Groves, Needham	2083	23	337.0
12	Yugoslavia	Lazarević, Nikolin, Maksimović, Maček	2165	23	333.5
13	France	Tagnon, Ruck-Petit, Lebel-Arias, Boulongne	1927	23	297.5
14	Bulgaria	Lematschko, Bojadjieva, Voyska, Angelova	2143	22½	335.5
15	Colombia	Guggenberger, Salazar Varón, Maya de Alzate, Leyva	1975	22½	311.5
16	Brazil	Jussara Chaves, Ribeiro, Joara Chaves, Cardoso	1892	22½	303.5
17	United States	Savereide, Haring, Lanni, Crotto	2110	22	339.0
18	Italy	Pernici, Iacono, Deghenghi, Moscatiello	1875	22	306.0
19	Canada	Shterenberg, Roos, Baltgailis, Mongeau	1953	22	302.5
20	Mongolia	Hulgana, P. Buzhinlham, Sh. Batcengel	1800	22	299.5
21	Australia	Slavotinek, Martin, Clementi, Travers	1885	22	292.0
22	Greece	Nika, Kondou, Firigou, K. Mihailidou	1802	22	235.0
23	Argentina	Soppe, Justo, Burijovich, Rizzo	1953	21½	305.5
24	Indonesia	Tamin, Wijayanti, Mun, S. Punyanan	1802	21½	287.0
25	Iceland	Torsteinsdóttir, Tráinsdóttir, Friðþjófsdóttir, Kristinsdóttir	1813	21	306.0
26	Switzerland	Veprek, Bürgin, Baumann, Steiner	1905	21	294.5
27	Philippines	Cartel, Fontanilla, Palacios	1833	21	265.5
28	New Zealand	Stretch, Burndred, Martin, Sievey	1800	21	219.5
29	Austria	Hennings, Hausner, Dür, Kattinger	1945	20½	301.0
30	Israel	Glaz, Schwartz, Gal, A. Inbar	1928	20½	297.0
31	Scotland	Milligan, Condie, Hindle, Morrison	1820	20½	294.5
32	Finland	Landry, Laitinen, Pihlajamäki, Ristoja	1923	20½	254.0
33	Mexico	Acevedo, Carvajal, Salazar	1843	20½	231.5
34	Belgium	De Corte, Careme, Schumacher, Maseyczik	1800	20	
35	Japan	Takahashi, Watai, Nakagawa, Kamijima	1860	19½	294.0
-	Switzerland "B"	Küng, Leu, Schladetzky, Eigenmann	1848	19½	279.0
36	Turkey	Gülümser Yılmaz, Arbil, Gülsevil Yılmaz, Yardımıcı	1838	19½	253.5
37	Venezuela	De Francisco, Niño del Táchira, Delgado, García La Rosa	1853	19½	244.5
38	Wales	Evans, Anson, Brunker, James	1815	18½	248.0
39	Norway	Klingen, Dahl, Birkestrand, Kumle	1800	18½	243.5
40	Ireland	Connolly, Martin, Delaney, Murphy	1800	18½	220.0
41	Egypt	Basta Sohair, A. Samy Maha, Ibrahim, Farag	1800	16½	
42	Trinidad and Tobago	Moheni, Belmar, M. Geofroy, R. Geofroy	1800	11½	
43	Zambia	Mbuye, E. Mzyece, Mulenga	1800	5½	
44	United States Virgin Islands	Widmer, Quenzel, F. Jankowski, N. Fodiaba	1800	4	

=== Individual medals ===
- Board 1: (Italy) Barbara Pernici 9½ / 12 = 79.2%
- Board 2: (Soviet Union) Nana Alexandria 7½ / 9 = 83.3%
- Board 3: (Romania) Daniela Nuțu-Terescenko 11 / 12 = 91.7%
- Reserve: (Romania) Elisabeta Polihroniade and (Colombia) Teresa Leyva 7 / 9 = 77.8%
