= Guillermo Vassaux =

Guatemalan chess player

Guillermo Enrique Vassaux Estévez
Personal information
- Born: June 25, 1909 Guatemala City
- Died: May 31, 2006 (aged 96) Guatemala City

Chess career
- Country: Guatemala

Guillermo Vassaux (25 June 1909 – 31 May 2006), full name Guillermo Enrique Vassaux Estévez, was a Guatemalan chess player, teacher, and writer, and fourteen-time winner of the Guatemalan Chess Championship from 1934 to 1973.

== Biography ==
Guillermo Vassaux was one of the founders of the Guatemalan National Chess Federation in 1939. In 1953 he was called one of the three great Guatemalan chess figures of the time along with Enrique Hidalgo and Carlos Enrique Salazar. He won the Guatemalan Chess Championship fourteen times over a 40-year span, in 1934, 1935, 1936, 1938, 1939, 1947, 1948, 1949, 1956, 1957, 1958, 1959, 1970, and 1973. In 1936 he lost a match in San Salvador against Antonio Salazar, who later became the first Salvadoran chess champion.

In international play, Guillermo Vassaux represented Guatemala in a match against El Salvador in 1930, the first chess match contested by two Central American countries. He participated in the Chess Olympiad once, representing Guatemala at first board in the 8th Chess Olympiad in 1939 in Buenos Aires, scoring five wins, two draws, and eight losses.

Later, Guillermo Vassaux participated in the first Canadian Open Chess Championship in 1956. He played for Guatemala in the CACAC Team Chess Championships (1968, 1971) and won an individual gold medal in 1971.

Guillermo Vassaux authored three chess books and wrote a regular chess column in the Prensa Libre from 1974 to 1991. From 1971 to 1991, he ran a chess program "Ajedrez bajo los árboles" in Minerva Park in Zone 2 of Guatemala City. His students there included future national champions Carlos Juárez, Carlos Reyes and Pablo Rodas. In recognition of his dedication to Guatemalan chess, he was awarded a Medal of Honour by the Ministry of Culture and Sports and the Presidential Medal by Óscar Berger shortly before his death.
