= Sygulski =

Sygulski is a Polish surname. Notable people with the surname include:

- Artur Sygulski (born 1960), Polish chess master
- Bogusław Sygulski (1957–2017), Polish chess master
