= Mazariegos (disambiguation) =

Mazariegos is a municipality located in the province of Palencia, Castile and León, Spain.

Mazariegos and de Mazariegos may also refer to:

== People ==
=== Surnamed Mazariegos ===
- Alexander Mazariegos (died 2012), Belizean shooting victim
- Andrés Mazariegos Vázquez (1932–2022), Spanish bullfighter, known as Andrés Vázquez or "El Nono"
- Fernando Mazariegos (1938–2018), Guatemalan inventor of the drinking water filter "Ecofilter"
- Pedro Molina Mazariegos (1777–1854), Central American politician, considered one of the founders of liberalism in Guatemala
- Rocael Mazariegos (born 1966), Guatemalan footballer
- Silvia Carolina Mazariegos (born 1961), Guatemalan Woman International Master in chess

=== Surnamed de Mazariegos ===
- Diego de Mazariegos (died 1536), Spanish conquistador
- Diego de Mazariegos Guadalfajara (16th century), colonial governor of Cuba and of Venezuela Province
