= Daniel Cámpora =

Argentine chess grandmaster (born 1957)

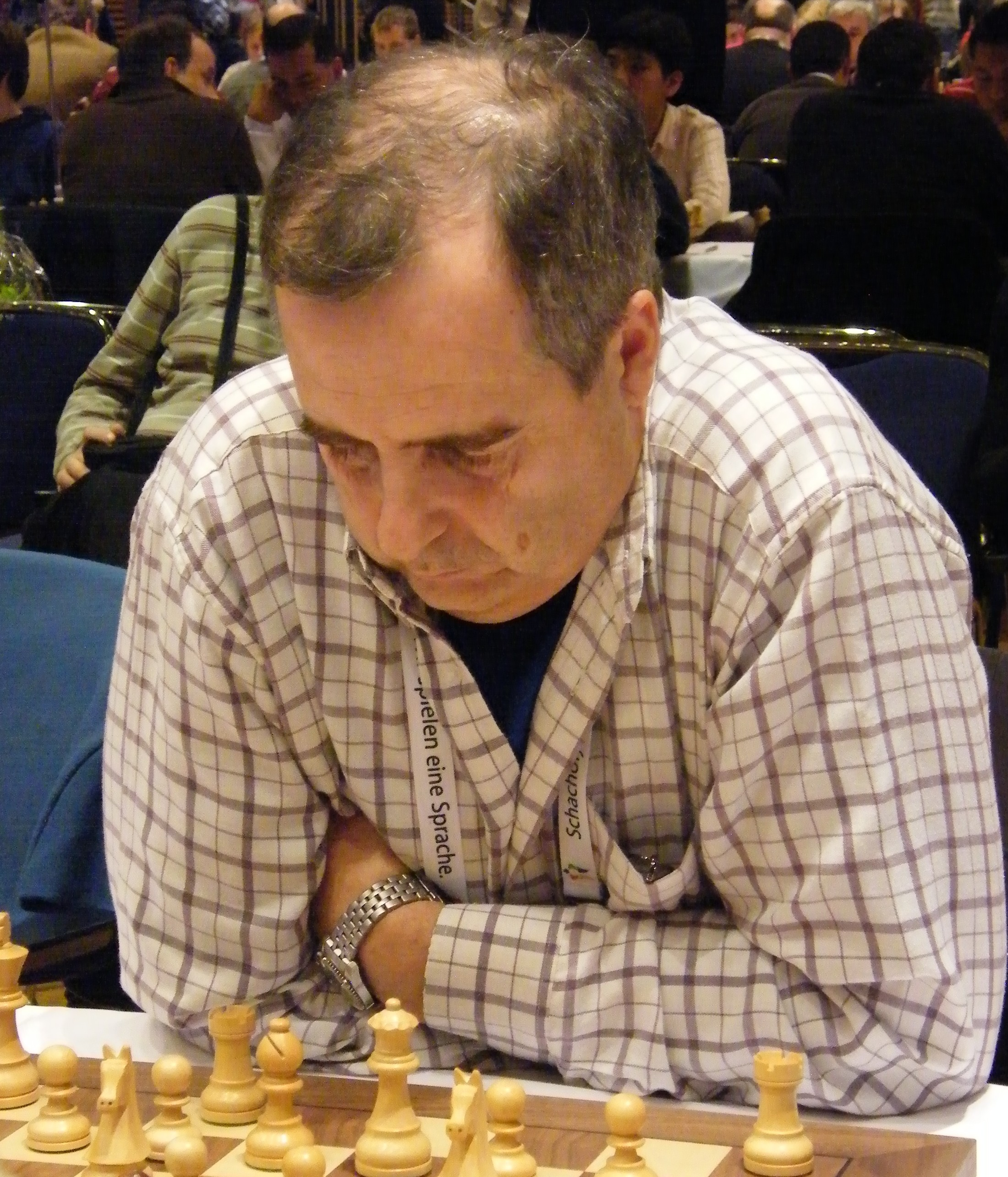
- Cámpora in Dresden, 2008

Personal information
- Born: Daniel Hugo Cámpora; 30 June 1957 (age 69) San Nicolás de los Arroyos, Argentina

Chess career
- Country: Argentina
- Title: Grandmaster (1986)
- Peak rating: 2565 (July 1992)

Daniel Hugo Cámpora (born 30 June 1957, in San Nicolás de los Arroyos) is an Argentine chess grandmaster and a twice Argentine champion, in 1986 and 1989. He finished runner-up in 1978 and 1987.

== Chess career ==
In 1975 he became Argentine junior champion. In tournaments, Cámpora took second place at Bogotá 1980 (Jose Antonio Gutierrez won), tied for 4–6th at the Kostić Memorial in Vršac 1981 (Gyula Sax won). In 1983, he finished second in Andorra and won in Tuzla. He won the Master Open Tournament in Biel in 1986. The following year, he placed third in the Biel Grandmaster Tournament (Boris Gulko won). Cámpora competed in two FIDE World Championships: in 2001 he eliminated in the first round Nigel Short, then lost to Jaan Ehlvest in the second; in 2004 he was knocked out in round 1 by Russian grandmaster Valerij Filippov.

Cámpora played for Argentina in nine Chess Olympiads:

- In 1978, at fourth board in 23rd Chess Olympiad in Buenos Aires (+3 –3 =2);
- In 1982, at second board in 25th Chess Olympiad in Lucerne (+7 –2 =4);
- In 1986, at first board in 27th Chess Olympiad in Dubai (+6 –1 =6);
- In 1988, at first board in 28th Chess Olympiad in Thessaloniki (+3 –4 =5);
- In 1992, at first board in 30th Chess Olympiad in Manila (+3 –0 =9);
- In 1994, at first board in 31st Chess Olympiad in Moscow (+7 –1 =1);
- In 2000, at second board in 34th Chess Olympiad in Istanbul (+3 –1 =5);
- In 2004, at second board in 36th Chess Olympiad in Calvià (+4 –0 =6);
- In 2008, at reserve board in 38th Chess Olympiad in Dresden (+1 –2 =3).

He won the individual gold medal at first board and silver medal for the best rating performance at Moscow 1994.

Cámpora was awarded the titles of International Master (IM) in 1982, and Grandmaster (GM) in 1986.

In recent years, Campora has been spending most of his time in Spain and Portugal participating in Open Tournaments.
