= Salvador Díaz =

Venezuelan chess player (born 1933)

Personal information
- Born: 23 June 1933 (age 93)

Chess career
- Country: Venezuela
- Title: FIDE Master (2021)
- Peak rating: 2121 (July 2012)

Salvador Díaz Carias (born 23 June 1933) is a Venezuelan chess FIDE Master (FM) (2021) and two-time Venezuelan Chess Championship winner (1960, 1978).

== Biography ==
Salvador Díaz developed into one of Venezuela's leading chess players between 1953 and 1960. Beginning in 1961, he reduced his chess activities and worked initially as a mathematics teacher, and from 1965 on as a programmer at IBM.

At the Venezuelan Chess Championship in 1958, Díaz came in shared first place but lost the playoff 2.5 : 3.5 against Antonio Medina García. In 1960, he won the title in Maracaibo with 10.5 points from 11 games and defended it in 1961 in a match against Celso Sánchez Pouso. Díaz was able to win the national championship again in 1978.

Díaz took part in several World Chess Championship Zonal Tournaments:

- in 1957 in Caracas he reached 8th place with 6 points from 13 games,
- in 1967 in Caracas he finished 7th with 4.5 points from 10 games,
- in 1972 in Bogotá he came 12th with 6 points from 15 games.

Díaz played for Venezuela in the Chess Olympiads:

- in 1966, at the second board in the 17th Chess Olympiad in Havana (+9, =5, -6),
- in 1968, at the first reserve board in the 18th Chess Olympiad in Lugano (+9, =3, -3),
- in 1978, at the third board in the 23rd Chess Olympiad in Buenos Aires (+3, =2, -5).

In 2021, at the age of 88, Díaz was awarded the title of FIDE Master based on his performance in tournaments in the 1960s.
