= Vesma Baltgailis =

Canadian chess player (1950–2021)

Personal information
- Born: 23 March 1950
- Died: 3 December 2021 (aged 71)

Chess career
- Country: Canada
- Title: Woman International Master (1985)
- FIDE rating: 2014 (October 2001)
- Peak rating: 2030 (January 1990)

Vesma Baltgailis (Latvian: Vēsma Baltgailis; 23 March 1950 – 3 December 2021) was a Canadian chess player of Latvian origin. She earned the FIDE title of Woman International Master (WIM) in 1985.

== Biography ==
From the late 1970s to the early 1990s, Vesma Baltgailis was one of Canada's leading chess players. From 1978 to 2001, she participated in the Canadian Women's Chess Championship nine times. Her best results: shared 2nd–4th place in 1991, and twice shared 3rd–4th place in 1989 and 1995.

Baltgailis played for Canada in the Women's Chess Olympiads:

- In 1978, at third board in the 8th Chess Olympiad (women) in Buenos Aires (+4, =4, -6),
- In 1982, at third board in the 10th Chess Olympiad (women) in Lucerne (+2, =3, -5),
- In 1984, at third board in the 26th Chess Olympiad (women) in Thessaloniki (+4, =0, -6),
- In 1988, at third board in the 28th Chess Olympiad (women) in Thessaloniki (+1, =1, -6),
- In 1990, at second board in the 29th Chess Olympiad (women) in Novi Sad (+1, =0, -8),
- In 1992, at third board in the 30th Chess Olympiad (women) in Manila (+4, =1, -6).
