= José Rafael Gascón Del Nogal =

Venezuelan chess grandmaster (born 1995)

Personal information
- Born: May 23, 1995 (age 31) Caracas, Venezuela

Chess career
- Country: Venezuela
- Title: Grandmaster (2018)
- FIDE rating: 2454 (November 2026)
- Peak rating: 2498 (August 2017)

José Rafael Gascón Del Nogal (born 23 May 1995) is a Venezuelan chess Grandmaster. He won the Venezuelan Chess Championship in 2015 and was awarded the Grandmaster title in 2018.

As of December 2023, he was the top-ranked player in Venezuela with an Elo rating of 2475.

== Biography and career ==
José Rafael Gascón Del Nogal was born on 23 May 1995. In December 2014, he won the GP SNV tournament in Caracas with a score of 7/10. He went on to win the 2014 Venezuelan Chess Championship (held in March 2015).

He represented Venezuela at the 42nd Chess Olympiad in 2016, scoring 7½/11 on board two.

In December 2017, he tied for second place (finishing fifth on tiebreaks) in the Sunway Sitges International Chess Festival in Sitges with 7/10.

In 2018, he became the second Venezuelan player to achieve the Grandmaster title. In February 2019, Gascón won the Rochefort Chess Festival.
