= Artur Sygulski =

Polish chess player (born 1960)

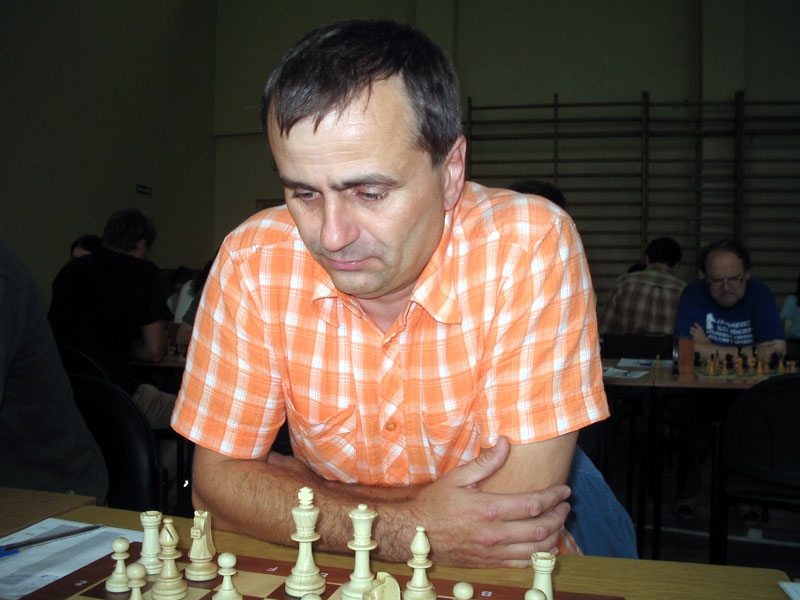
- Artur Sygulski in 2006

Personal information
- Born: 22 July 1960 (age 65) Praszka, Poland

Chess career
- Country: Poland
- Title: International Master (1984)
- Peak rating: 2445 (January 1985)

Artur Sygulski (born 22 July 1960) is a Polish chess International Master (1984).

== Biography ==
In the 1980s Artur Sygulski was one of the top Polish chess players. Already in his first start in the final of Polish Chess Championship in 1982 he made a surprise, sharing in Zielona Góra 1st-2nd place. In the play-off for the title of Polish champion, however, he lost to Jan Adamski by 1½:2½ and eventually won the silver medal. In 1983–1987, Artur Sygulski appeared 4 more times in the finals of the national championships, coming closest to a medal in 1985, when he took the fourth place. He is a three-time silver medalist of the Polish Blitz Chess Championship (1982, 1983, 1988). Artur Sygulski won four medals in Polish Team Chess Championship: 2 silver (1983, 1988) and 2 bronze (1986, 1987). He was very successful in 1984 in Nałęczów, taking third place behind Viktor Gavrikov and Andrei Sokolov. In the same year Artur Sygulski was awarded the title of International Master (IM).

Artur Sygulski played for Poland in the Chess Olympiads:

- In 1982, at second reserve board in the 25th Chess Olympiad in Lucerne (+4, =2, -1),
- In 1984, at reserve board in the 26th Chess Olympiad in Thessaloniki (+6, =3, -2),
- In 1986, at fourth board in the 27th Chess Olympiad in Dubai (+2, =4, -1).

Artur Sygulski played for Poland in the Nordic Chess Cup:

- In 1985, at second board in the 10th Nordic Chess Cup in Pohja (+2, =2, -3) and won team bronze medal.

Artur Sygulski reached the highest rating in his career on January 1, 1985, with a score of 2445 points, he was ranked 4th (behind Włodzimierz Schmidt, Jan Adamski and Aleksander Sznapik) among Polish chess players. Since 1988, he practically does not participate in chess tournaments, occasionally appearing in team competitions in Germany, Poland and England.

== Private life ==
His brother, Bogusław, was also a well-known chess player and held the title of international master.
