= Małgorzata Wiese-Jóźwiak =

Polish chess player (born 1961)

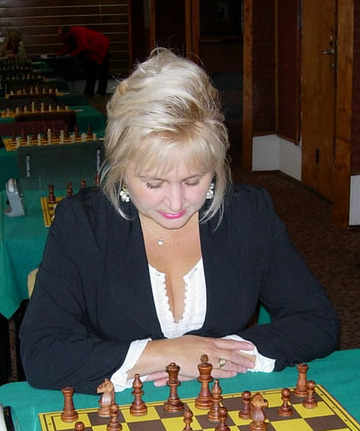
- Małgorzata Wiese-Jóźwiak in 2006

Personal information
- Born: 16 March 1961 (age 65) Bydgoszcz, Poland

Chess career
- Country: Poland
- Title: Woman International Master (1981)
- Peak rating: 2290 (January 1987)

Małgorzata Wiese-Jóźwiak (née Wiese, born 16 March 1961) is a Polish chess player who won the Polish Women's Chess Championship in 1985. She received the FIDE title of Woman International Master (WIM) in 1981.

== Chess career ==
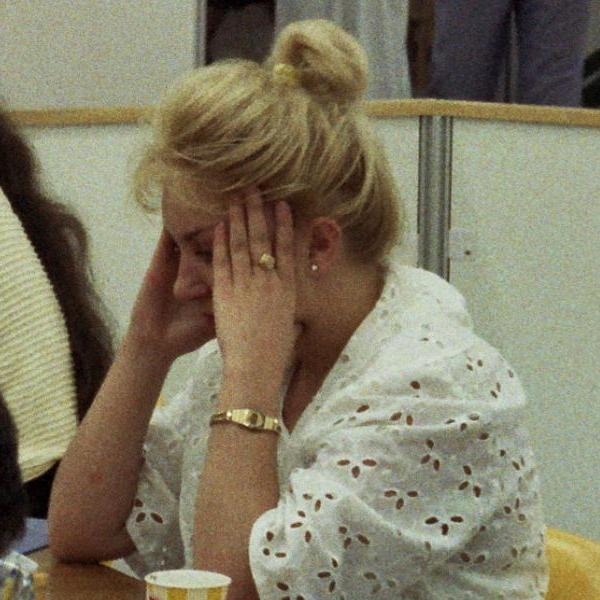
Małgorzata Wiese-Jóźwiak in Chess Olympiad (Dubai, 1986)

Daughter of Polish chess organizer and economist Ryszard Wiese (03.02.1937–16.12.2013). In 1976 Małgorzata Wiese-Jóźwiak won the Polish Junior Chess Championship. From the mid 1970s to the late 1980s she was one of the leading Polish women chess player. From 1975 to 1990 Małgorzata Wiese-Jóźwiak played 14 times in the Polish Women's Chess Championship's finals and won nine medals: gold (1985), 6 silver (1978, 1982, 1983, 1986, 1988, 1990) and 2 bronze (1977, 1980).

She won two medals in European Junior Chess Championship - silver (1981) and bronze (1979). Małgorzata Wiese-Jóźwiak won international tournaments in Piotrków Trybunalski (1980), Nałęczów (1980, 1982). In 1984 open tournament in Hamburg Małgorzata Wiese-Jóźwiak fulfilled Grandmaster norm. In 1985 in the Nordic Chess Cup she won 6½/7 and received best individual result in this tournament.

Małgorzata Wiese-Jóźwiak played for Poland in Women's Chess Olympiads:

- In 1978, at first reserve board in the 8th Women's Chess Olympiad in Buenos Aires (+3, =1, -2),
- In 1980, won team bronze medal at third board in the 9th Women's Chess Olympiad in La Valletta (+5, =3, -3),
- In 1982, at third board in the 10th Women's Chess Olympiad in Lucerne (+7, =3, -2),
- In 1984, at third board in the 26th Chess Olympiad (women) in Thessaloniki (+4, =3, -4),
- In 1986, at third board in the 27th Chess Olympiad (women) in Dubai (+1, =4, -3),
- In 1988, at third board in the 28th Chess Olympiad (women) in Thessaloniki (+5, =4, -2).

In 1991 Małgorzata Wiese-Jóźwiak retired from chess.
