= Guatemalan Chess Championship =

The Guatemalan Chess Championship is the annual individual national chess championship of Guatemala. Following are the official winners of the national competition from 1923 to date.

== Champions ==
Year	Men's Champion
1923	Carlos W. Morales
1924	Julio Urrutia
1925	Rafael Rodríguez Padilla
1926	José Luis Asturias
1927	José Luis Asturias
1928	José Luis Asturias
1929	José Luis Asturias
1930	José Luis Asturias
1931	José Luis Asturias
1932	José Luis Asturias
1933	Enrique Hidalgo
1934	Guillermo Vassaux
1935	Guillermo Vassaux
1936	Guillermo Vassaux
1937	Enrique Hidalgo
1938	Guillermo Vassaux
1939	Guillermo Vassaux
1940	Ricardo García Ruíz
1941	Carlos Enrique Salazar
1942	Ricardo Mencos
1943	Carlos Enrique Salazar
1944	Carlos Enrique Salazar
1945	Enrique Hidalgo
1946	Enrique Hidalgo
1947	Guillermo Vassaux
1948	Guillermo Vassaux
1949	Guillermo Vassaux
1950	Manuel Barbales
1951	Manuel Barbales
1952	Manuel Barbales
1953	Rafael Rosito
1954	Manuel Martínez
1955	Manuel Martínez
1956	Guillermo Vassaux
1957	Guillermo Vassaux
1958	Guillermo Vassaux
1959	Guillermo Vassaux
1960	Abel Girón
1961	Abel Girón
1962	Abel Girón
1963	Abel Girón
1964	Abel Girón
1965	Abel Girón
1966	Abel Girón
1967	Abel Girón
1968	Abel Girón
1969	Otto Rolando de León
1970	Guillermo Vassaux
1971	Otto Rolando de León
1972	Otto Rolando de León
1973	Guillermo Vassaux
1974	Ramón Quintana
1975	Ramón Quintana
1976	Fredy Pérez
1977	Danilo Canda
1978	Gonzalo Deras
1979	Roberto Molina
1980	Carlos Armando Juárez Flores
1981	Pablo Rodas Martini
1982	Pablo Rodas Martini
1983	Carlos Armando Juárez Flores
1984	Carlos Armando Juárez Flores
1985	Carlos Armando Juárez Flores
1986	Carlos Armando Juárez Flores
1987	Carlos Armando Juárez Flores
1988	Carlos Armando Juárez Flores
1989	Carlos Antonio Reyes Nájera
1990	Carlos Antonio Reyes Nájera
1991	Carlos Armando Juárez Flores
1992	Carlos Antonio Reyes Nájera
1993	Carlos Armando Juárez Flores
1994	Carlos Armando Juárez Flores
1995	Carlos Armando Juárez Flores
1996	Alfonso Roberto Juárez Flores
1997	Alfonso Roberto Juárez Flores
1998	Carlos Armando Juárez Flores
1999	Carlos Armando Juárez Flores
2000	Carlos Armando Juárez Flores
2001	Carlos Armando Juárez Flores
2002	Carlos Armando Juárez Flores
2003	Carlos Armando Juárez Flores
2004	Carlos Armando Juárez Flores
2005	Carlos Armando Juárez Flores
2006	Carlos Armando Juárez Flores
2007	Carlos Armando Juárez Flores
2009	Carlos Armando Juárez Flores
2010–2011	Carlos Armando Juárez Flores
2011–2012	Carlos Quiñonez
2012	Carlos Armando Juárez Flores
2013	Winston Darwin Cu Hor
2014	Carlos Armando Juárez Flores
2015–2016	Carlos Armando Juárez Flores
2017	Carlos Armando Juárez Flores
2018	Winston Darwin Cu Hor
2019	Winston Darwin Cu Hor
2020	Carlos Armando Juárez Flores
2022	Carlos Armando Juárez Flores
2023	Carlos Armando Juárez Flores
2024	Carlos Armando Juárez Flores
2025	David Girón Chávez

Year	Women's Champion
1925	Judith Quiñónez de García Granados
1981	Silvia Carolina Mazariegos
1982	Silvia Carolina Mazariegos
1983	Silvia Carolina Mazariegos
1984	Silvia Carolina Mazariegos
1985	Silvia Carolina Mazariegos
1986	Silvia Carolina Mazariegos
1987	Silvia Carolina Mazariegos
1988	Silvia Carolina Mazariegos
1989	Silvia Carolina Mazariegos
1990	Silvia Carolina Mazariegos
1991	Silvia Carolina Mazariegos
1992	Silvia Carolina Mazariegos
1993	Silvia Carolina Mazariegos
1994	Silvia Carolina Mazariegos
1995	Ingrid Lorena Martínez Porras
1996	Dina Lissette Castillo Melendez
1997	Dina Lissette Castillo Melendez
1998	Ingrid Lorena Martínez Porras
1999	Ingrid Lorena Martínez Porras
2000	Karla Vanessa Monterroso Ochoa
2001	Silvia Carolina Mazariegos
2002	Silvia Carolina Mazariegos
2003	Ingrid Lorena Martínez Porras
2004	Silvia Carolina Mazariegos
2005	Ingrid Lorena Martínez Porras
2006	Claudia Mencos
2007	Claudia Mencos
2008	Claudia Mencos
2009–2010	Silvia Carolina Mazariegos
2010–2011	Claudia Mencos
2011–2012	Silvia Carolina Mazariegos
2012	Claudia Mencos
2013–2014	Silvia Sotomayor
2014	Silvia Carolina Mazariegos
2015–2016	Silvia Carolina Mazariegos
