= Bielczyk =

Bielczyk is a Polish surname. Notable people with the surname include:

- Jacek Bielczyk (born 1953), Polish chess master
- Piotr Bielczyk (born 1952), Polish javelin thrower
- Zofia Bielczyk (born 1958), Polish hurdler, wife of Piotr
