= Jan Adamski =

Polish chess player (1943–2026)

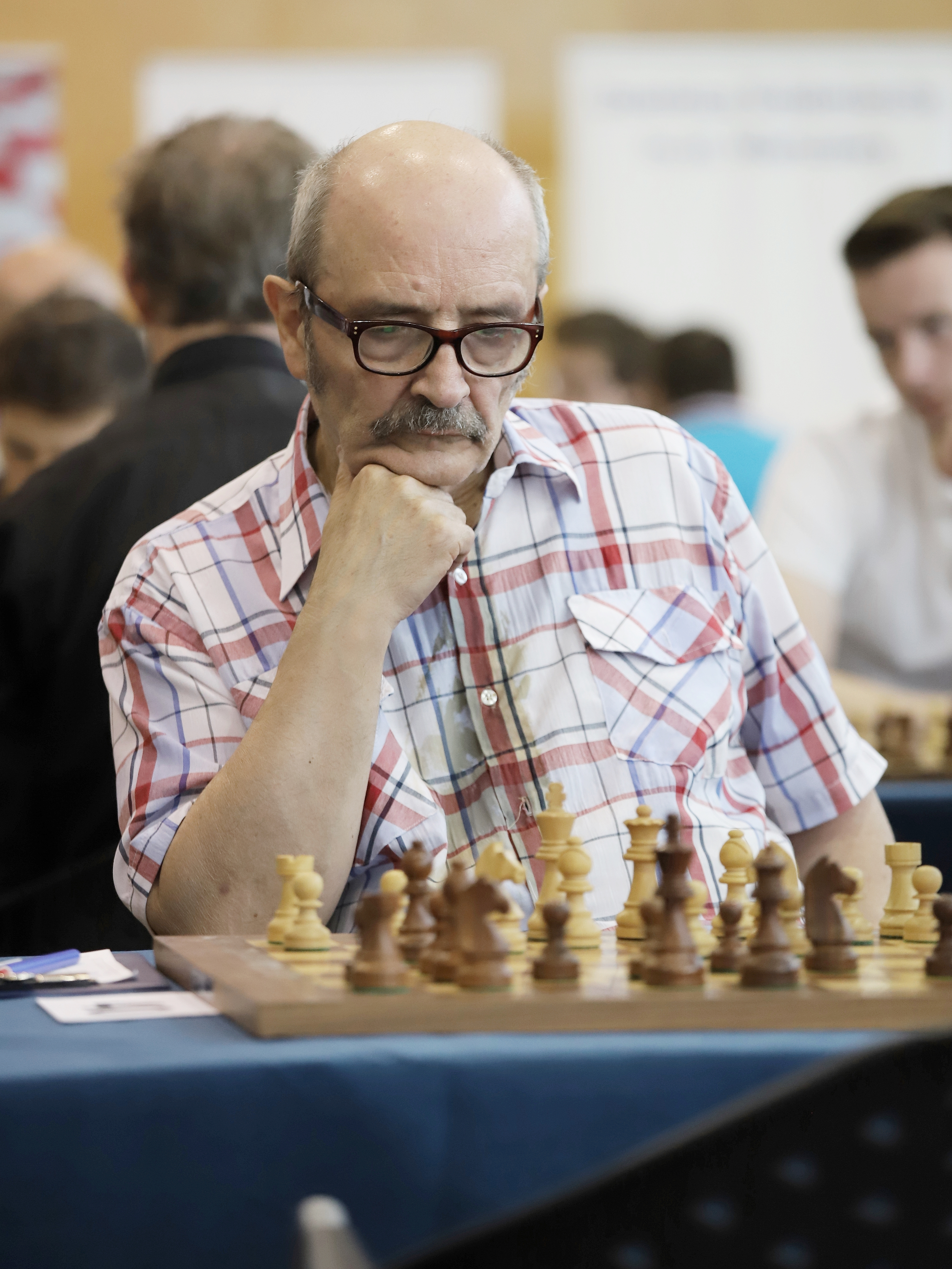
- Adamski in 2019

Personal information
- Born: 11 November 1943 Warsaw, General Government
- Died: 21 May 2026 (aged 82)

Chess career
- Country: Poland
- Title: International Master (1976)
- Peak rating: 2470 (January 1977)

Jan Adamski (11 November 1943 – 21 May 2026) was a Polish chess player who won the Polish Chess Championship in 1982. He received the FIDE title of International Master (IM) in 1976.

== Biography ==
In 1963, Adamski was fourth in World U-20 Championship in Vrnjačka Banja. In the Polish Chess Championship, Adamski has won gold (1982), five silver (1968, 1969, 1970, 1975, 1985) and two bronze medals (1973, 1974). He twice won the Polish Rapid Chess Championship (1975, 1983). In Polish Team Chess Championship, Adamski nine times won the team event. He was awarded the International Master title in 1976.

Adamski played for Poland in Chess Olympiads:

- In 1968, at reserve board in the 18th Chess Olympiad in Lugano (+5, =3, -4),
- In 1970, at third board in the 19th Chess Olympiad in Siegen (+7, =3, -2),
- In 1974, at reserve board in the 21st Chess Olympiad in Nice (+4, =4, -3),
- In 1978, at fourth board in the 23rd Chess Olympiad in Buenos Aires (+4, =6, -3),
- In 1982, at fourth board in the 25th Chess Olympiad in Lucerne (+1, =2, -1),
- In 1984, at fourth board in the 26th Chess Olympiad in Thessaloniki (+1, =3, -2).

He played for Poland in European Team Chess Championship:

- In 1973, at sixth board in the 5th European Team Chess Championship in Bath (+0, =3, -2).

Adamski was a well-known chess coach and teacher of many famous chess players. He was a trainer of Woman Grandmaster (WGM) Agnieszka Brustman.

Adamski died on 21 May 2026, at the age of 82.
