= 2024 Sumenep regency election =

- 27 November 2024
- Turnout: 74.81%
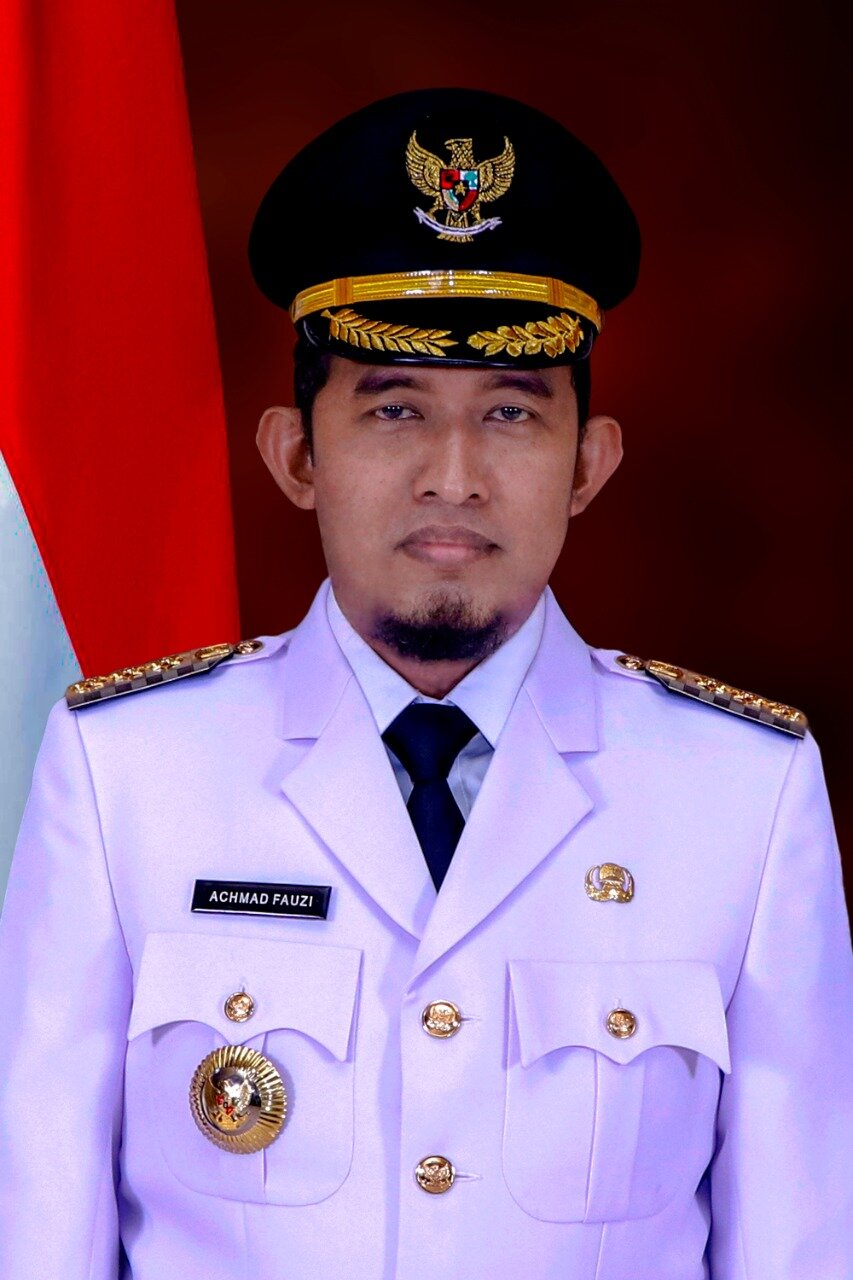

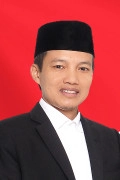
Candidate	Achmad Fauzi	Ali Fikri
Party	PDI-P	PPP
Running mate	Imam Hasyim	Unais Ali Hisyam
Popular vote	379,858	249,597
Percentage	60.35%	39.65%
Regent before election
Achmad Fauzi
PDI-P
Elected Regent
Achmad Fauzi
PDI-P

The 2024 Sumenep regency election was held on 27 November 2024 as part of nationwide local elections to elect the regent and vice regent of Sumenep Regency, East Java for a five-year term. Incumbent regent Achmad Fauzi of the Indonesian Democratic Party of Struggle (PDI-P) was re-elected to a second term in a landslide, receiving 60% of the vote. He defeated Ali Fikri of the United Development Party (PPP), who received 39%.

== Electoral system ==
The election, like other local elections in 2024, follow the first-past-the-post system where the candidate with the most votes wins the election, even if they do not win a majority. It is possible for a candidate to run uncontested, in which case the candidate is still required to win a majority of votes "against" an "empty box" option. Should the candidate fail to do so, the election will be repeated on a later date.

The election's total budget is Rp 122 billion, including Rp 70 billion from Sumenep's General Elections Commission (KPU), Rp 42 billion for the Election Supervisory Agency (Bawaslu), and another Rp 10 billion for Sumenep's police and military district as security costs. In September 2024, KPU announced that the electorate would include 859,185 voters, who were to vote in 1,967 polling stations. 58 of these stations were considered as "vulnerable" or "very vulnerable" to security threats or cheating due to their remoteness, mostly those located on Sumenep's small islands.

== Candidates ==
The incumbent regent Achmad Fauzi Wongsojudo of the Indonesian Democratic Party of Struggle secured the backing of his party to run for a second term. As his running mate was Imam Hasyim, chairman of the National Awakening Party (PKB)'s Sumenep branch. Fauzi's former deputy, Dewi Khalifah, had previously declared her willingness to become Fauzi's deputy for a second term, but was ultimately not selected due to "political calculations". They were supported by a coalition of nine political parties with seats in Sumenep's Regional House of Representatives (DPRD).

Running against Fauzi was Ali Fikri of the United Development Party (PPP), who was chairman of PPP's Sumenep branch and a kyai at a local pesantren in Sumenep. Fikri's running mate was Muhammad Unais Ali Hisyam, a former member of the national House of Representatives from PKB. Their candidacy was initially in doubt, as PPP failed to form a coalition with other parties, but following a Constitutional Court ruling which lowered candidacy support requirements, PPP became eligible to run a candidate without coalition. 7 parties without DPRD seats later also endorsed Fikri.

== Campaign ==
Three rounds of public debates were held between the candidates. The official campaigning period for the election was between 25 September and 23 November 2024, during which Fauzi as the sitting regent was required to take leave.

On the date of the election, a protest was held at Sumenep's KPU office as many households did not receive an invitation letter for the election.

== Results ==
Candidate	Running mate	Party	Votes	%
Achmad Fauzi	Imam Hasyim	Indonesian Democratic Party of Struggle	379,858	60.35
Ali Fikri	Unais Ali Hisyam	United Development Party	249,597	39.65
Total			629,455	100.00
Valid votes			629,455	97.93
Invalid/blank votes			13,289	2.07
Total votes			642,744	100.00
Registered voters/turnout			859,185	74.81
Source: KPU

== Aftermath ==
Ali Fikri's campaign team filed a lawsuit to the Constitutional Court of Indonesia against the election, alleging manipulation of vote tallies and the cancellation of voting in a number of polling stations in Sumenep. The lawsuit was thrown out as it was filed after the deadline - i.e. 3 working days after the results were made official by KPU. Several hundred people also protested at Sumenep's Bawaslu office against the alleged cheating.
