= Eduardo Iturrizaga =

Venezuelan-Spanish chess grandmaster (born 1989)

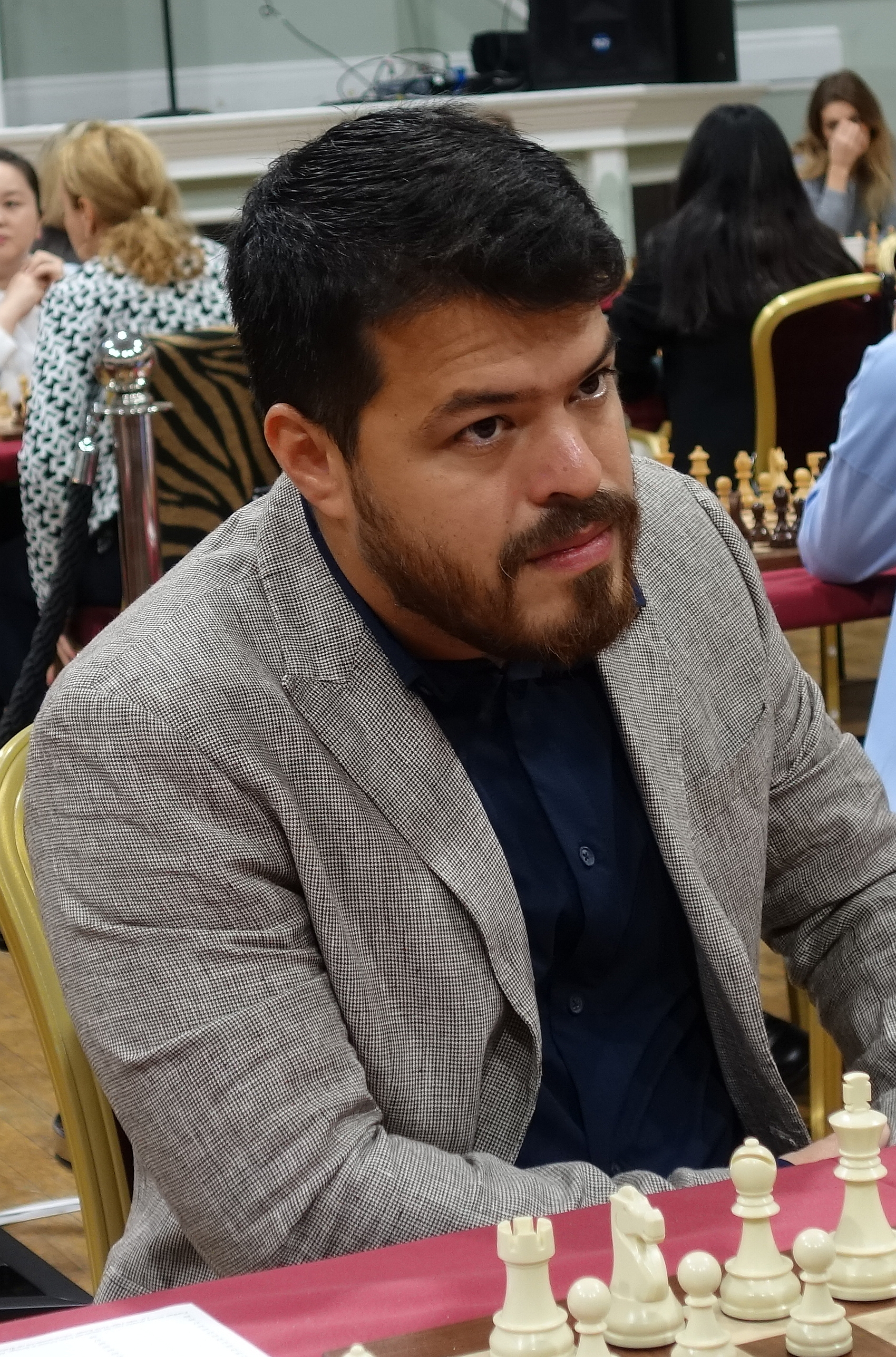
- Iturrizaga in 2023

Personal information
- Born: Eduardo Patricio Iturrizaga Bonelli; 1 November 1989 (age 36) Caracas, Venezuela

Chess career
- Country: Venezuela (until 2021); Spain (since 2021)
- Title: Grandmaster (2008)
- FIDE rating: 2587 (July 2026)
- Peak rating: 2673 (March 2017)
- Peak ranking: No. 72 (March 2017)

Eduardo Patricio Iturrizaga Bonelli (born 1 November 1989) is a Venezuelan-born Spanish chess player. He was awarded the title Grandmaster by FIDE in 2008, making him the first Venezuelan to achieve this. He competed in the FIDE World Cup in 2007, 2009, 2013, and 2015. He is a four-time Venezuelan champion and has represented his country at eight Chess Olympiads.

== Chess career ==
Iturrizaga learned to move the chess pieces at age five. "I opened with pawn to e4, then moved my knights, and put pawns on h3 and a3 for castling and to connect the rooks. For me that was all", he recalls. He moved to Peru when he was seven, and it was upon his return to Venezuela at age nine he started to take the game seriously. At age thirteen he attained the title of International Master. Iturizzaga won the Pan American under-16 championship in 2004 and the Pan American under-20 championship in 2006, both times in Bogotà.

Iturrizaga won four consecutive national championships from 2005 to 2008, and has been playing for Venezuela at the Chess Olympiad since 2004. His best performance came at the 37th Chess Olympiad (2006), when he scored 8.5/11 points playing second board. The result earned him an individual bronze medal. He qualified for the Chess World Cup 2007 after a shared first place at the American Continental Championship. He was set to face Peter Svidler in the first round, but forfeited the first game due to getting lost between Russian airports. He lost the second game. In 2008, Iturrizaga won an online qualifier for the C-group in the 2009 Corus Chess Tournament, defeating GM Alexandr Fier 3-1 in the final. He ended up in a shared eighth place out of fourteen in the main tournament, scoring 5.5/13. Iturrizaga finished second in the 2008 Ibero-American Championship in Linares, Spain, losing to Julio Granda in the final. Iturrizaga was the last person to arrive at the tournament, had to play one game at night, and nearly arrived late for one of the matches.

After sharing first place at the Zonal 2.3 Chess Championships in San Jose, Costa Rica with Lázaro Bruzón, Iturrizaga qualified for the Chess World Cup 2009. He was knocked out by Baadur Jobava in the second round, having defeated Sergei Tiviakov 3.5 - 2.5 in the first round.

In April 2010, Iturrizaga tied for 1st-8th place in the 12th Dubai Open Chess Championship with Viorel Iordachescu, Hrant Melkumyan, Sergey Volkov, Gadir Guseinov, David Arutinian, Aleksej Aleksandrov and Tornike Sanikidze, besting a field consisting of 36 GMs and 154 players total. He placed fourth in the 2010 Ibero-American Championship held in Mexico City. He defaulted the third-fourth playoff, despite winning the first game, after arriving an hour late for the second.

Iturrizaga competed in the Chess World Cup 2013, where he was knocked out in the first round by Alexander Onischuk. In the 2015 edition of the same event, he was eliminated in round one again, this time by Maxim Rodshtein. In January 2015 Iturrizaga tied for 1st–5th with Arkadij Naiditsch, Alexander Donchenko, Matthias Dann and Miloš Pavlović in the Masters tournament of the Basel Chess Festival. In 2017, Iturrizaga won the 21st Hogeschool Zeeland Open in Vlissingen, Netherlands on tiebreak from Jorden Van Foreest.

== Playing style ==
As of 2010, Iturrizaga mostly plays queen's pawn openings, and the English Opening with the white pieces, and the Accelerated Dragon Sicilian Defence with black. Iturrizaga admires Bobby Fischer and is a follower of Levon Aronian's playstyle.
