= Javier Ochoa de Echagüen =

Spanish chess player

Personal information
- Born: 4 September 1954 (age 71) Vitoria-Gasteiz, Spain

Chess career
- Country: Spain
- Title: International Master (1981)
- FIDE rating: 2414 (July 2026)
- Peak rating: 2455 (July 1995)

Francisco Javier Ochoa de Echagüen (Basque: Javier Otxoa de Etxaguen; born 4 September 1954), is Basques origin Spanish chess International Master (IM) (1981), Spanish Chess Championship medalist (1993), Chess Olympiad individual gold medalist (1984).

== Biography ==
In 1974, Javier Ochoa de Echagüen won the Spanish Junior Chess Championship. In 1989, he won the Spanish Rapid Chess Championship and an international chess tournament in Andorra. In 1993, Javier Ochoa de Echagüen became the silver medal winner of the Spanish Chess Championship.

Javier Ochoa de Echagüen played for Spain in the Chess Olympiads:

- In 1976, at second reserve board in the 22nd Chess Olympiad in Haifa (+1, =2, -1),
- In 1982, at second reserve board in the 25th Chess Olympiad in Lucerne (+4, =3, -1),
- In 1984, at first reserve board in the 26th Chess Olympiad in Thessaloniki (+6, =2, -1) and won individual gold medal,
- In 1986, at fourth board in the 27th Chess Olympiad in Dubai (+2, =4, -2),
- In 1988, at second reserve board in the 28th Chess Olympiad in Thessaloniki (+4, =4, -1).

In 1981, he was awarded the FIDE International Master (IM) title. Javier Ochoa de Echagüen is president of the Spanish Chess Federation and president of Iberoamerican Chess Federation (FIBDA).
