= Félix Ynojosa =

Venezuelan chess player (born 1996)

Personal information
- Born: January 29, 1996 (age 30) Barinas, Venezuela

Chess career
- Country: England (until 2011); Venezuela (since 2011)
- Title: International Master (2013)
- FIDE rating: 2430 (October 2026)
- Peak rating: 2455 (April 2014)

Félix José Ynojosa Aponte is a Venezuelan chess player. He is a five-time Venezuelan Chess Champion, winning from 2011 to 2014 and in 2024.

== Chess career ==
In July 2023, he won the silver medal on board 2 in the blitz category of the XXIV Central American and Caribbean Games.

In July 2026, he won the blitz category of the XXV Central American and Caribbean Games, scoring 12/15.

In September 2026, he played for Venezuela in the 46th Chess Olympiad, where he scored 7/9 and notably held a draw against grandmaster Arkadij Naiditsch and defeated grandmasters Anton Demchenko and Shawn Rodrigue-Lemieux.

== Personal life ==
He studied economics and finance at the University of Texas Rio Grande Valley and played on the university's chess team B. In 2019, the Brownsville City Commission recognized the teams for their achievements at the Texas Collegiate SuperFinals.
