= Steen Fedder =

Danish chess player

Personal information
- Born: 14 June 1951 (age 75)

Chess career
- Country: Denmark
- Title: International Master (1982)
- Peak rating: 2440 (January 1983)

Steen Fedder (born 14 June 1951), is a Danish chess International Master (IM) (1982), Danish Chess Championship medalist (1980), Nordic Chess Cup winner (1973).

== Biography ==
From the mid-1970s to the mid-1980s, Steen Fedder was among the best Danish chess players. Steen Fedder participated many times in Danish Chess Championships and achieved the best result in 1980, when he won the 3rd place.

Steen Fedder played for Denmark in the Chess Olympiads:

- In 1978, at fourth board in the 23rd Chess Olympiad in Buenos Aires (+6, =4, -2),
- In 1980, at third board in the 24th Chess Olympiad in La Valletta (+3, =6, -3),
- In 1982, at third board in the 25th Chess Olympiad in Lucerne (+5, =4, -2).

Steen Fedder played for Denmark in the European Team Chess Championships:

- In 1983, at third board in the 8th European Team Chess Championship in Plovdiv (+0, =1, -5).

Steen Fedder played for Denmark in the World Student Team Chess Championships:

- In 1972, at first board in the 19th World Student Team Chess Championship in Graz (+2, =7, -2),
- In 1974, at second board in the 20th World Student Team Chess Championship in Teesside (+6, =6, -1).

Steen Fedder played for Denmark in the Nordic Chess Cups:

- In 1973, at third board in the 4th Nordic Chess Cup in Ribe (+4, =0, -1) and won team and individual gold medals,
- In 1985, at fourth board in the 10th Nordic Chess Cup in Pohja (+2, =3, -2) and won team silver medal.

In 1982, Steen Fedder was awarded the FIDE International Master (IM) title.
