= Alberto Caro =

Venezuelan chess player (born 1937)

Personal information
- Born: 29 October 1937 (age 88)

Chess career
- Country: Venezuela
- Title: Candidate Master (2014)
- Peak rating: 2235 (January 1975)

Alberto Napoleon Caro (born 29 October 1937) is a Venezuelan chess player, five-time Venezuelan Chess Championship winner (1961, 1963, 1968, 1972, 1973).

== Biography ==
From the mid-1960s to the mid-1970s, Alberto Caro was one of Venezuela's leading chess players. He five times won Venezuelan Chess Championship: 1961, 1963, 1968, 1972, and 1973. Alberto Caro twice participated in World Chess Championship Central American Zonal tournaments (1960, 1972). His best result was shared 3rd–4th place in 1960.

Alberto Caro played for Venezuela in the Chess Olympiads:

- In 1964, at third board in the 16th Chess Olympiad in Tel Aviv (+4, =9, -5),
- In 1966, at fourth board in the 17th Chess Olympiad in Havana (+3, =8, -4),
- In 1968, at first board in the 18th Chess Olympiad in Lugano (+4, =4, -5),
- In 1974, at fourth board in the 21st Chess Olympiad in Nice (+6, =8, -5).
