= Gerardo Budowski =

German-Venezuelan chess player (1925–2014)

Gerardo (Gert) Budowski (10 June 1925 – 8 October 2014) was a German–Venezuelan chess master.

He was born in Berlin into a family with a love of chess. His mother drew a game with José Raúl Capablanca in his simultaneous exhibition in October 1925 in Berlin. His father had a friendly relationship with Alexander Alekhine who gave paid chess lessons to the child prodigy in Paris. The Jewish family left Nazi Germany in 1933 for France, and then - during World War II - emigrated to Venezuela, where Gert changed his name to Gerardo and became a Venezuelan citizen in the early 1950s. From 1952, he resided in Costa Rica.

Dr. Budowski graduated in 1948 as an agricultural engineer from the Universidad Central in Caracas, Venezuela, then earned his master's degree at the Inter-American Institute for Cooperation in Agriculture (IICA) in Turrialba, Costa Rica. In 1962, he obtained his doctoral degree in forestry from Yale University. He was Director General of IUCN (International Union for Conservation of Nature) from 1970 to 1976. From 1980, Dr. Budowski was instrumental in the development of the University for Peace, not only did he start the Environmental programme but he also served in positions such as Interim Rector and Vice-Rector. In 2008, he was awarded the title of professor emeritus for his vision in the relation between peace and the environment.

He won the Campeón Absoluto de Venezuela title 6–0 by beating Julio García (Campeón Nacional de Venezuela) in 1951. He also participated in other championships in Costa Rica in the 1950s. He won Costa Rican team championship, playing for Turrialba, in 1965. He represented Venezuela in the Chess Olympiad at Lugano 1968.

Dr. Budowski died of natural causes on October 8, 2014, in San José, Costa Rica.
