= Jose Antonio Gutierrez Castillo =

Colombian chess player

José Antonio Gutiérrez
Personal information
- Full name: José Antonio Gutiérrez Herrera
- Born: 26 August 1943 (age 82)

Chess career
- Country: Colombia
- Title: International Master (1972)
- FIDE rating: 2090 (November 2021)
- Peak rating: 2315 (October 2005)

José Antonio Gutiérrez Herrera (born 26 August 1943), also known as José Antonio Gutiérrez Castillo, is a Colombian chess player and FIDE International Master.

== Biography ==
From the begin of 1970s to the begin 1990s, Gutiérrez was one of Colombia's leading chess players. In 1972, he participated in World Chess Championships Central American Zonal tournament and ranked in 4th place.

Gutiérrez played for Colombia in the Chess Olympiads:

- In 1972, at second board in the 20th Chess Olympiad in Skopje (+1, =5, -11),
- In 1978, at second board in the 23rd Chess Olympiad in Buenos Aires (+5, =2, -4),
- In 1982, at third board in the 25th Chess Olympiad in Lucerne (+5, =2, -2),
- In 1984, at third board in the 26th Chess Olympiad in Thessaloniki (+2, =2, -3),
- In 1986, at fourth board in the 27th Chess Olympiad in Dubai (+4, =5, -3),
- In 1988, at first reserve board in the 28th Chess Olympiad in Thessaloniki (+6, =1, -2),
- In 1992, at first reserve board in the 30th Chess Olympiad in Manila (+3, =0, -1).

In 1972, Gutiérrez was awarded the FIDE International Master (IM) title. Also he was FIDE Arbiter.
