= Pricha Sinprayoon =

Thai chess player

Personal information
- Born: 17 January 1944 (age 82)

Chess career
- Country: Thailand
- Peak rating: 2350 (July 1982)

Pricha Sinprayoon (Thai: ปรีชา สินประยูร; born 17 January 1944), is a Thai chess player, Chess Olympiad individual gold medalist (1984).

== Biography ==
From the mid-1970s to the mid-1990s Pricha Sinprayoon was one of the best chess players in Thailand.

Pricha Sinprayoon played for Thailand in the Chess Olympiads:

- In 1976, at second board in the 22nd Chess Olympiad in Haifa (+2, =1, -6),
- In 1980, at second board in the 24th Chess Olympiad in La Valletta (+3, =7, -4),
- In 1982, at first board in the 25th Chess Olympiad in Lucerne (+2, =1, -9),
- In 1984, at fourth board in the 26th Chess Olympiad in Thessaloniki (+7, =2, -1) and won individual gold medal,
- In 1986, at first board in the 27th Chess Olympiad in Dubai (+6, =1, -7),
- In 1988, at second board in the 28th Chess Olympiad in Thessaloniki (+2, =1, -5).

Pricha Sinprayoon played for Thailand in the Men's Asian Team Chess Championships:

- In 1977, at first board in the 2nd Asian Team Chess Championship in Auckland (+2, =1, -5),
- In 1979, at first board in the 3rd Asian Team Chess Championship in Singapore (+2, =1, -6),
- In 1981, at fourth board in the 4th Asian Team Chess Championship in Hangzhou (+4, =0, -4).

Since end of 1990, Pricha Sinprayoon has rarely participated in chess tournaments.
