= Antonio Palacios Lanza =

Venezuelan chess player

Personal information
- Born: 13 November 1952 (age 73)

Chess career
- Country: Venezuela
- Title: International Master (1978)
- Peak rating: 2370 (January 1978)

Antonio Palacios Lanza (born 13 November 1952) is a Venezuelan chess International Master (IM) (1978), Venezuelan Chess Championship winner (1976), Chess Olympiad individual silver medal winner (1988).

== Biography ==
From the mid-1970s to the end of the 1980s, Antonio Palacios Lanza was one of Venezuela's leading chess players. He won Venezuelan Chess Championship in 1976. In 1981 Antonio Palacios Lanza participated in Pan American Chess Championship.

Antonio Palacios Lanza played for Venezuela in the Chess Olympiads:

- In 1976, at second board in the 22nd Chess Olympiad in Haifa (+3, =3, -4),
- In 1980, at third board in the 24th Chess Olympiad in La Valletta (+4, =8, -1),
- In 1982, at second board in the 25th Chess Olympiad in Lucerne (+4, =3, -6),
- In 1988, at second board in the 28th Chess Olympiad in Thessaloniki (+6, =2, -1) and won individual silver medal.

Antonio Palacios Lanza played for Venezuela in the World Student Team Chess Championships:

- In 1976, at second board in the 21st World Student Team Chess Championship in Caracas (+2, =4, -2),
- In 1977, at first board in the 22nd World Student Team Chess Championship in Mexico City (+3, =5, -4).

In 1978, Antonio Palacios Lanza was awarded the FIDE International Master (IM) title. He was the trainer and captain of the Women's Venezuelan team in the 40th Chess Olympiad (women) (2012).
