= László Tapasztó =

Hungarian–Venezuelan chess player (born 1930)

Personal information
- Born: September 5, 1930 (age 95) Orosháza, Hungary

Chess career
- Country: Venezuela
- Title: Candidate Master (2014)
- Peak rating: 2370 (January 1989)

László Tapasztó Binet (born September 5, 1930, Orosháza, Hungary) is a Hungarian–Venezuelan chess master.

He twice participated in the Hungarian Chess Championship, in 1954 (won by László Szabó) and 1955 (won by Gedeon Barcza), and won a local tournament in Budapest in 1955. He fled Hungary after the Hungarian Revolution of 1956, and finally became a Venezuelan citizen.

Tapasztó won the Venezuelan Chess Championship six times (1964, 1966, 1971, 1983, 1990, and 1995), played at Caracas 1967 (zonal, Miguel Cuéllar won), and represented Venezuela in Chess Olympiads three times (1964, 1988, 1990).

At the end of the 1990s, he moved to the United States, where he played in the New York State championships at Saratoga Springs 2000 and Rochester 2001. Unfortunately, he had a stroke in 2005, but continues to play at the Rochester Chess Center.
