= José Luis Asturias =

Guatemalan chess player

Personal information
- Born: February 25, 1897
- Died: August 6, 1961 (aged 64)

Chess career
- Country: Guatemala

José Luis Asturias (unknown – unknown), was a Guatemalan chess player, seven times Guatemalan Chess Championship winner (1926, 1927, 1928, 1929, 1930, 1931, 1932).

== Biography ==
José Luis Asturias was the strongest chess player in Guatemala at the turn of the 1920s–1930s. From 1926 to 1932 he won 7 national championships in a row.

José Luis Asturias played for Guatemala in the Chess Olympiad:

- In 1939, at second board in the 8th Chess Olympiad in Buenos Aires (+2, =2, -11).
