= Stuart Fancy =

Papua New Guinean chess player (born 1959)

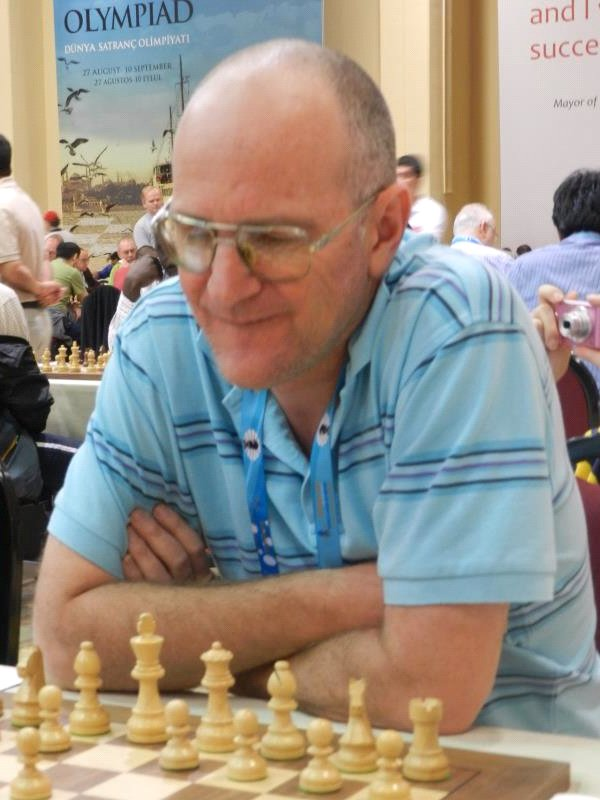
- Stuart Fancy at the 40th Chess Olympiad in Istanbul, Turkey 2012

Personal information
- Born: 2 January 1959 (age 67) London, England

Chess career
- Country: Papua New Guinea
- Title: FIDE Master (2012)
- Peak rating: 2215 (January 1993)

Stuart Fancy (born 2 January 1959 in London, England) is a Papua New Guinean chess FIDE Master (FM).

== Chess career ==
Fancy was a member of the Lloyds Bank British Junior Chess Squad from 1971 to 1974, and then took a break from playing chess. He moved to Papua New Guinea in 1982 and started playing chess again.

Fancy represented Papua New Guinea in seven Chess Olympiads from 1982 to 2018, playing on board 1 since 2002. His best results were winning the individual Gold Medal on 2nd Reserve Board at the 25th Chess Olympiad in Lucerne 1982, and the silver medal for Board 2 at the 30th Chess Olympiad in Manila 1992. Fancy gained the FIDE Master title in 2012 for his result at the 1992 Olympiad.

Fancy competed in the Oceania Zonal Chess Championships in 2002, 2007, 2013, 2015 and 2019. He also competed in the 6th Asian Chess Championship in Cebu City 2007.

== Notable games ==
- Ben Magana vs Stuart Fancy, 37th Chess Olympiad (2006), Sicilian Defence: Rossolimo Attack, (B30), 0-1
- Stuart Fancy vs Mirabeau Maga, 6th Asian Individual Championship (2007), Sicilian Defence: Accelerated Dragon, (B06), 1-0
