= Julio Ostos =

Venezuelan chess player (1953–2023)

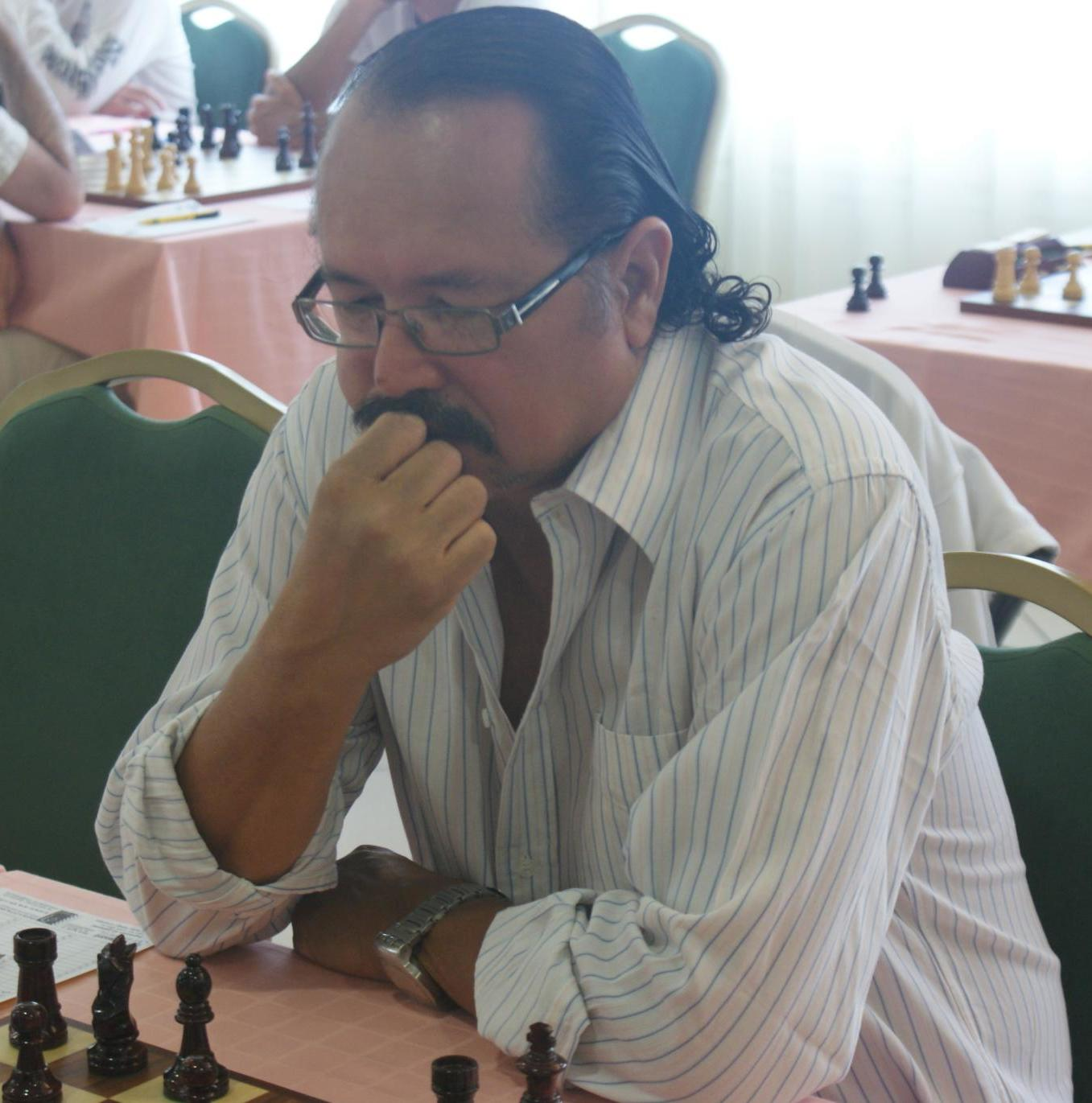
- Ostos at the 2012 Andorra Open

Personal information
- Born: 10 December 1953
- Died: 25 July 2023 (aged 69)

Chess career
- Country: Venezuela
- Title: International Master (1978)
- Peak rating: 2390 (January 1988)

Julio Eduardo Ostos (10 December 1953 – 25 July 2023) was a Venezuelan chess International Master (IM) (1978) and five-time Venezuelan Chess Championship winner (1974, 1980, 1985, 1987, 2000).

== Biography ==
From the mid-1970s to the end of the 2000s, Ostos was one of Venezuela's leading chess players. He won the Venezuelan Chess Championship five times: 1974, 1980, 1985, 1987, and 2000. Ostos participated in the Pan American Chess Championship three times: 1988, 2007, and 2010.

Ostos played for Venezuela in the Chess Olympiads:

- In 1976, at first board in the 22nd Chess Olympiad in Haifa (+1, =5, −3),
- In 1978, at first board in the 23rd Chess Olympiad in Buenos Aires (+7, =4, −3),
- In 1980, at first board in the 24th Chess Olympiad in La Valletta (+4, =5, −3),
- In 1982, at third board in the 25th Chess Olympiad in Lucerne (+6, =3, −4),
- In 1988, at first board in the 28th Chess Olympiad in Thessaloniki (+4, =3, −5),
- In 1990, at first board in the 29th Chess Olympiad in Novi Sad (+4, =1, −5),
- In 1996, at first board in the 32nd Chess Olympiad in Yerevan (+5, =1, −6),
- In 2000, at first reserve board in the 34th Chess Olympiad in Istanbul (+3, =2, −2),
- In 2002, at first reserve board in the 35th Chess Olympiad in Bled (+4, =2, −2),
- In 2004, at third board in the 36th Chess Olympiad in Calvià (+3, =0, −5),
- In 2006, at first reserve board in the 37th Chess Olympiad in Turin (+2, =1, −3),
- In 2012, at fourth board in the 40th Chess Olympiad in Istanbul (+2, =3, −3).

Ostos played for Venezuela in the World Student Team Chess Championships:

- In 1976, at first board in the 21st World Student Team Chess Championship in Caracas (+4, =1, −6),
- In 1977, at second board in the 22nd World Student Team Chess Championship in Mexico City (+9, =1, −2).

Ostos played for Venezuela in the Pan American Team Chess Championships:

- In 2000, at second board in the 6th Panamerican Team Chess Championship in Mérida (+2, =0, −2) and won individual bronze medal.

In 1978, Ostos was awarded the FIDE International Master (IM) title.
