= Aníbal Gamboa =

Venezuelan chess player (1948–2020)

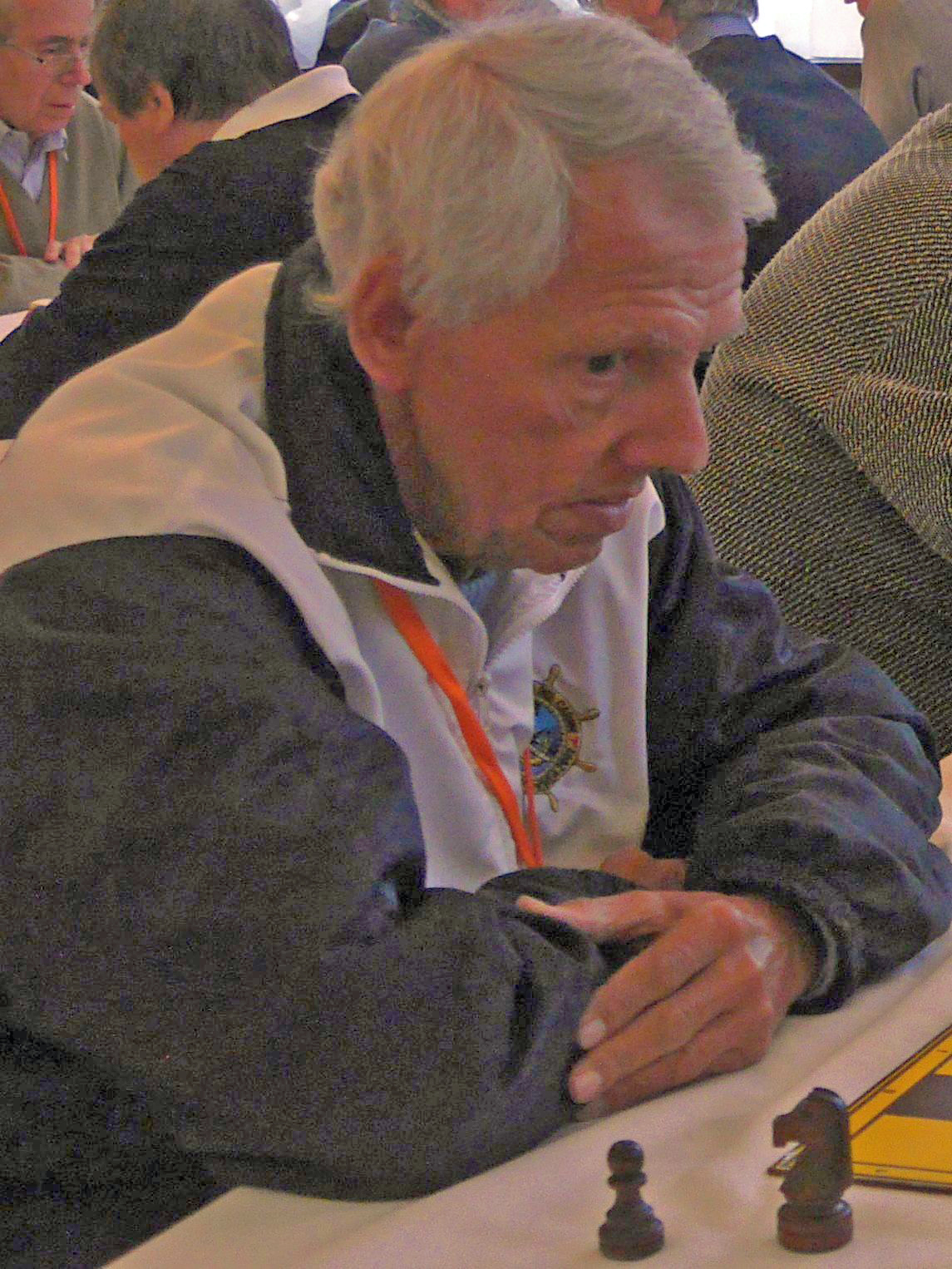
- Anibal Gamboa in 2016

Personal information
- Born: 1948
- Died: 17 August 2020 (aged 71–72)

Chess career
- Country: Venezuela
- Title: International Master (2015)
- Peak rating: 2220 (January 1975)

Aníbal Gamboa González (1948 – 17 August 2020) was a Venezuelan chess International Master (IM) (2015), Venezuelan Chess Championship winner (1970).

== Biography ==
In the 1970s and the 1980s, Anibal Gamboa was one of Venezuela's leading chess players. He won Venezuelan Chess Championship in 1970.

Anibal Gamboa played for Venezuela in the Chess Olympiads:

- In 1974, at second board in the 21st Chess Olympiad in Nice (+6, =3, -10),
- In 1978, at fourth board in the 23rd Chess Olympiad in Buenos Aires (+2, =2, -5),
- In 1982, at second reserve board in the 25th Chess Olympiad in Lucerne (+0, =1, -0),
- In 1988, at first reserve board in the 28th Chess Olympiad in Thessaloniki (+0, =0, -5).

In recent years, he has participated in chess veteran tournaments, including the World Senior Chess Championships.
