= Carlos Enrique Salazar =

Guatemalan chess player

Personal information
- Born: 1924
- Died: unknown

Chess career
- Country: Guatemala

Carlos Enrique Salazar (1924 – unknown), was a Guatemalan chess player, three times Guatemalan Chess Championship winner (1941, 1943, 1944).

== Biography ==
From the late 1930s to the late 1940s, Carlos Enrique Salazar was one of Guatemala's leading chess players He won Guatemalan Chess Championships in 1941, 1943, and 1944.

Carlos Enrique Salazar played for Guatemala in the Chess Olympiad:

- In 1939, at fourth board in the 8th Chess Olympiad in Buenos Aires (+4, =4, -7).
