= Jacek Bielczyk =

Polish chess player (born 1953)

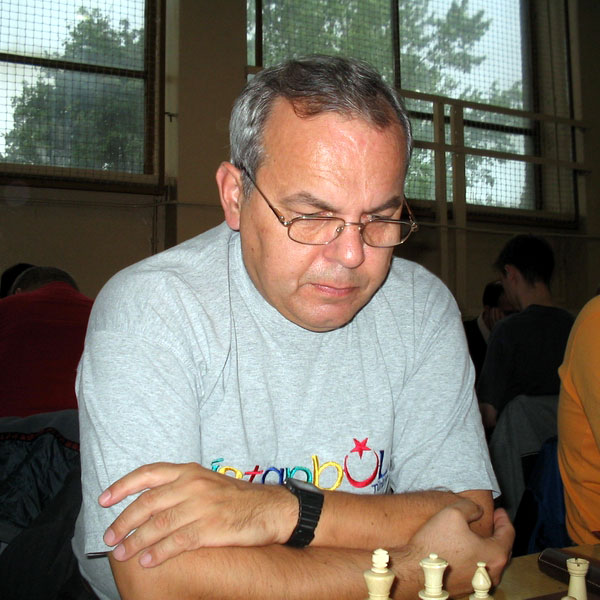
- Jacek Bielczyk in 2006

Personal information
- Born: 23 February 1953 (age 73) Siemianowice Śląskie, Poland

Chess career
- Country: Poland
- Title: International Master (1979)
- Peak rating: 2410 (January 1979)

Jacek Bielczyk (born 23 February 1953) is a Polish chess International Master (1979).

== Biography ==
At the beginning of the 1970s, Jacek Bielczyk was the leading junior of the country, twice (in 1971 and 1972) winning the Polish Junior Chess Championship in U20 age group, and in 1973 - the title of vice-champion. In 1972–1973, he represented Poland at the European Junior Chess Championships in Groningen. In 1973 he won the junior chess tournament in Warsaw. He made his senior debut in the Polish Chess Championship final in 1975, taking 5th place in Poznań. In total, in the years 1975–1983, he took part in the final tournaments for the national championship nine times, achieving the best result in Zielona Góra in the 1982, when he took the 4th place. He is a three-time medalist of the Polish Blitz Chess Championship: silver (1975) and 2 bronze (1979, 1987). Jacek Bielczyk won eight medals in Polish Team Chess Championship: 4 silver (1973, 1975, 1985, 1986) and 4 bronze (1968, 1970, 1976, 1984). In 1976, he shared the 2nd place in Słupsk (behind Mark Tseitlin). In 1990, he was awarded second place (after Vereslav Eingorn, together with, among others, Vitaly Tseshkovsky, Oleg Romanishin, Alexey Vyzmanavin and Gennady Kuzmin) in the Open Chess Tournament Berliner Sommer in Berlin, while fulfilling the norm for the title of Grandmaster (GM).

Jacek Bielczyk played for Poland in the Chess Olympiads:

- In 1980, at fourth board in the 24th Chess Olympiad in La Valletta (+3, =4, -3),
- In 1982, at first reserve board in the 25th Chess Olympiad in Lucerne (+2, =5, -1).

Jacek Bielczyk played for Poland in the European Team Chess Championships preliminaries:

- In 1977, at reserve board in the 6th European Team Chess Championship preliminaries (+1, =0, -1),
- In 1980, at eighth board in the 7th European Team Chess Championship preliminaries (+1, =1, -1),
- In 1983, at fifth board in the 8th European Team Chess Championship preliminaries (+1, =3, -0).

Jacek Bielczyk played for Poland in the World Student Team Chess Championships:

- In 1976, at second board in the 21st World Student Team Chess Championship in Caracas (+2, =7, -0),
- In 1977, at third board in the 22nd World Student Team Chess Championship in Mexico City (+6, =3, -2).

Jacek Bielczyk achieved the highest rating in his career on January 1, 1979, with a score of 2410 points, he was ranked 7th among Polish chess players at that time.

Since 1996, Jacek Bielczyk has been a member of the board of Polish Chess Federation, serving as the chairman of the Committee of Coaches (1996-2000) and vice-president for sports (2004-2008).

Jacek Bielczyk is the author of many chess publications in chess magazines (e.g. Szachy, Szachista, Panorama Chess, Checkmate), and he also edited the chess column in the Katowice-based newspaper Sport.

In October 2021, Jacek Bielczyk was awarded the Cross of Merit "for achievements in training and coaching work" with deaf chess players.
