= Craig Van Tilbury =

American guitarist and chess player (1957–2010)

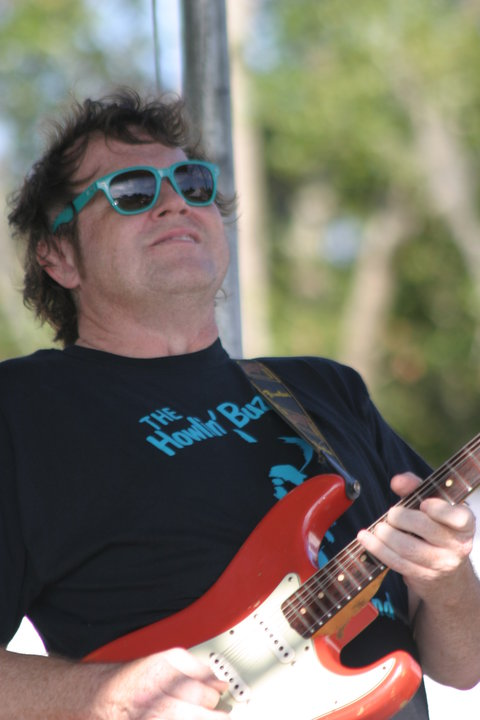
- Van Tilbury in 2010

Background information
- Born: Craig Leo Van Tilbury; July 30, 1957; Cedar Rapids, Iowa, U.S.
- Died: August 13, 2010 (aged 53) Tampa, Florida, U.S.
- Genres: Blues, rock
- Occupations: Musician, chess player
- Instrument: Guitar
- Years active: 1977–2010
- Formerly of: Green Flash
- Chess career
- Country: U.S. Virgin Islands (until 1984); British Virgin Islands (after 1984)
- Title: FIDE Master (1986)
- Peak rating: 2350 (January 1979)

Craig Leo Van Tilbury (July 30, 1957 – August 13, 2010) was an American guitarist and FIDE Chess Master, known musically for his touring and guest work with artists such as Steve Winwood, Barry Gibb, Joey Dee and the Starliters, The Young Rascals, and The Shirelles. He was a founder of the St. Croix band, Green Flash and had played or substituted in several Tampa Bay area bands. He is best known in the world of chess for having played in 10 Chess Olympiads.

== Biography ==
Van Tilbury was born on July 30, 1957, in Cedar Rapids, Iowa, to Jack and Constance Van Tilbury. The family later moved to Arlington, Virginia. He developed an interest in rock and blues music at an early age and was inspired by guitarists such as Eric Clapton and Jimmy Page. Van Tilbury graduated Yorktown High School in 1975 and attended NVCC until 1977.

In 1978, Van Tilbury moved to St. Croix in the U.S. Virgin Islands to establish residency and play chess competitively. He won a gold medal for the best individual score on Board 1 in the 1984 Olympiad in Thessaloniki, Greece. In 1977 he won the Washington, D.C., Open and also the Jamaican Open in 1981. He also played top board for the British Virgin Islands.

After surviving Hurricane Hugo in 1989, Van Tilbury moved to Tampa, Florida, in 1992. He met singer Annie Waddey in 2002; the couple had a daughter Annabelle Rose in 2009. Van Tilbury died of a heart attack on August 13, 2010, at the age of 53.
