= Carlos Antonio Reyes Nájera =

Guatemalan chess player (born 1961)

Personal information
- Born: 27 October 1961 (age 64)

Chess career
- Country: Guatemala
- Title: FIDE Master (1999)
- Peak rating: 2280 (July 1981)

Carlos Antonio Reyes Nájera (born 27 October 1961) is a Guatemalan chess FIDE Master (FM), three-time Guatemalan Chess Championship winner (1989, 1990, 1992) and Chess Olympiad individual gold medalist (1988).

== Biography ==
Carlos Antonio Reyes Nájera was one of the leading Guatemalan chess players in the late 1980s and early 1990s. He won three Guatemalan Chess Championships: 1989, 1990, and 1992. He also won a bronze medal in this tournament in 1991. Carlos Antonio Reyes Nájera played in FIDE Zonal tournaments three times: 1998, 2000, and 2004.

Carlos Antonio Reyes Nájera played for Guatemala in the Chess Olympiads:

- In 1982, at the fourth board in the 25th Chess Olympiad in Lucerne (+4, =5, -3),
- In 1988, at the third board in the 28th Chess Olympiad in Thessaloniki (+7, =1, -2), winning an individual gold medal,
- In 1990, at the first board in the 29th Chess Olympiad in Novi Sad (+5, =2, -6),
- In 2004, at the third board in the 36th Chess Olympiad in Calvià (+4, =4, -4),
- In 2006, at the first reserve board in the 37th Chess Olympiad in Turin (+4, =4, -3).

Carlos Antonio Reyes Nájera played for Guatemala in the World Youth U26 Team Chess Championship:

- In 1980, at the fourth board in the 2nd World Youth U26 Team Chess Championship in Mexico City (+6, =3, -3),
- In 1983, at the third board in the 4th World Youth U26 Team Chess Championship in Chicago (+2, =1, -5).

Carlos Antonio Reyes Nájera is also known as a chess life organizer. He is the Technical Director of the Guatemalan Chess Federation.
