= Ramón Quintana =

Spanish field hockey player (born 1950)

Personal information
- Full name: Ramón Quintana Bosch
- Nationality: Spanish
- Born: 30 August 1950 (age 75) Barcelona, Spain

Sport
- Sport: Field hockey

Ramón Quintana Bosch (Note: In this Spanish name, the first or paternal surname is Quintana and the second or maternal family name is Bosch.) (born 30 August 1950) is a Spanish field hockey player. He competed at the 1972 Summer Olympics and the 1976 Summer Olympics.
