= Achmad Fauzi =

Indonesian politician

Achmad Fauzi Wongsojudo
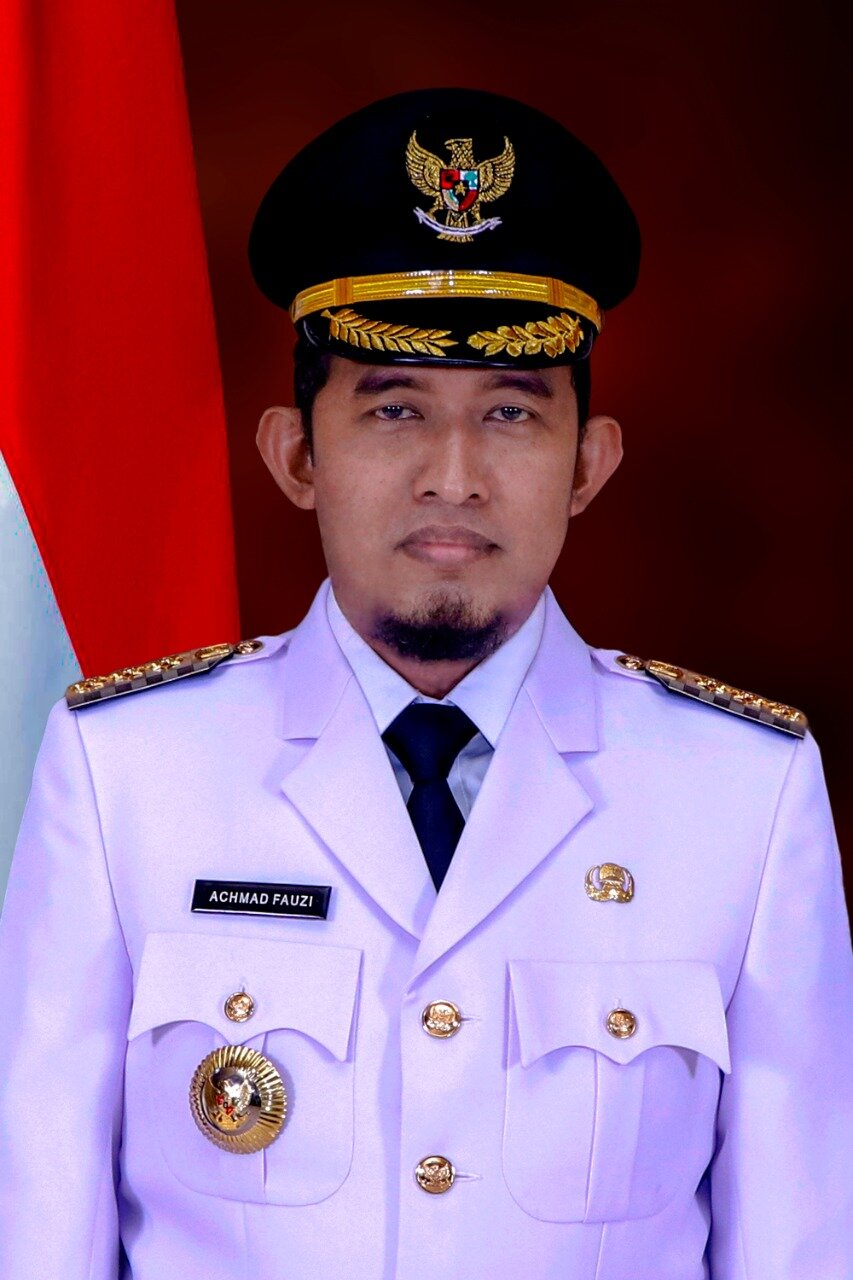
- Fauzi in 2021

Regent of Sumenep
- Incumbent
- Assumed office 26 February 2021
- Preceded by: Abuya Busyro Karim

Personal details
- Born: Achmad Fauzi; 21 May 1979 (age 46) Sumenep, East Java, Indonesia
- Party: PDI-P

Achmad Fauzi Wongsojudo (born 21 May 1979) is an Indonesian politician from PDI-P, businessman, and former journalist who is the regent of Sumenep Regency, East Java, having served since February 2021. He had previously served as Sumenep's vice regent between 2016 and 2021.

== Early life ==
Achmad Fauzi was born on 21 May 1979 at the town of Sumenep, in East Java. His father, Slamet Wongsojudo, was a civil servant working in Sumenep's education department and later a member of Sumenep's regency legislature. He died in 1985 while Fauzi was in elementary school. Fauzi would later append his father's surname Wongsojudo to his legal name in 2023, after returning from hajj. His mother Ainun is the brother of Said Abdullah, a multiple-term member of the House of Representatives representing Madura.

Fauzi graduated from a public madrasa in Sumenep in 1998. He later would study law at Dr. Soetomo University in Surabaya, receiving a bachelor's degree in 2014 and a master's degree in 2018.

== Career ==
In 2002, Fauzi began to work as a journalist at the tabloid magazine Indonesia. By 2006, he had become its chief editor, and was appointed as the magazine's CEO in 2008. Fauzi also became director at a Madura-based oil and gas company, along with an advertising firm and a printing company.

Fauzi in 2015 ran in Sumenep's regency election as the running mate of incumbent regent Abuya Busyro Karim, with the pair receiving support from PKB, PDI-P, and Nasdem. They won with 301,887 votes (50%) in a three-way race, and were sworn in on 17 February 2016. Fauzi became chairman of PDI-P's Sumenep branch during his time as vice regent, and when Karim's second term was about to expire, Fauzi received PDI-P's endorsement to run in the 2020 regency election. Running with Dewi Khalifah as running mate, they won the election with 319,876 votes (51.9%). They were sworn in on 26 February 2021.

His first term saw the regency government conduct infrastructure improvements, with 133.32 kilometres (82.84 mi) of new roads being built and an additional 9,000 households being connected to the municipal water network. 3 km of seawall were also erected in Sumenep to reduce coastal erosion. Sumenep's expanded Trunojoyo Airport was inaugurated during Fauzi's first term, and he lobbied for the opening of new routes to boost the number of tourists visiting the regency.

In the 2024 Sumenep regency election, Fauzi ran with Imam Hasyim, and was elected for a second term with 379,858 votes (60.35%).

== Personal life ==
He is married to Nia Kurnia, who in the 2024 legislative election was elected to Sumenep's Regional House of Representatives as a PDI-P member.
