= Antonio Medina García =

Spanish chess player (1919–2003)

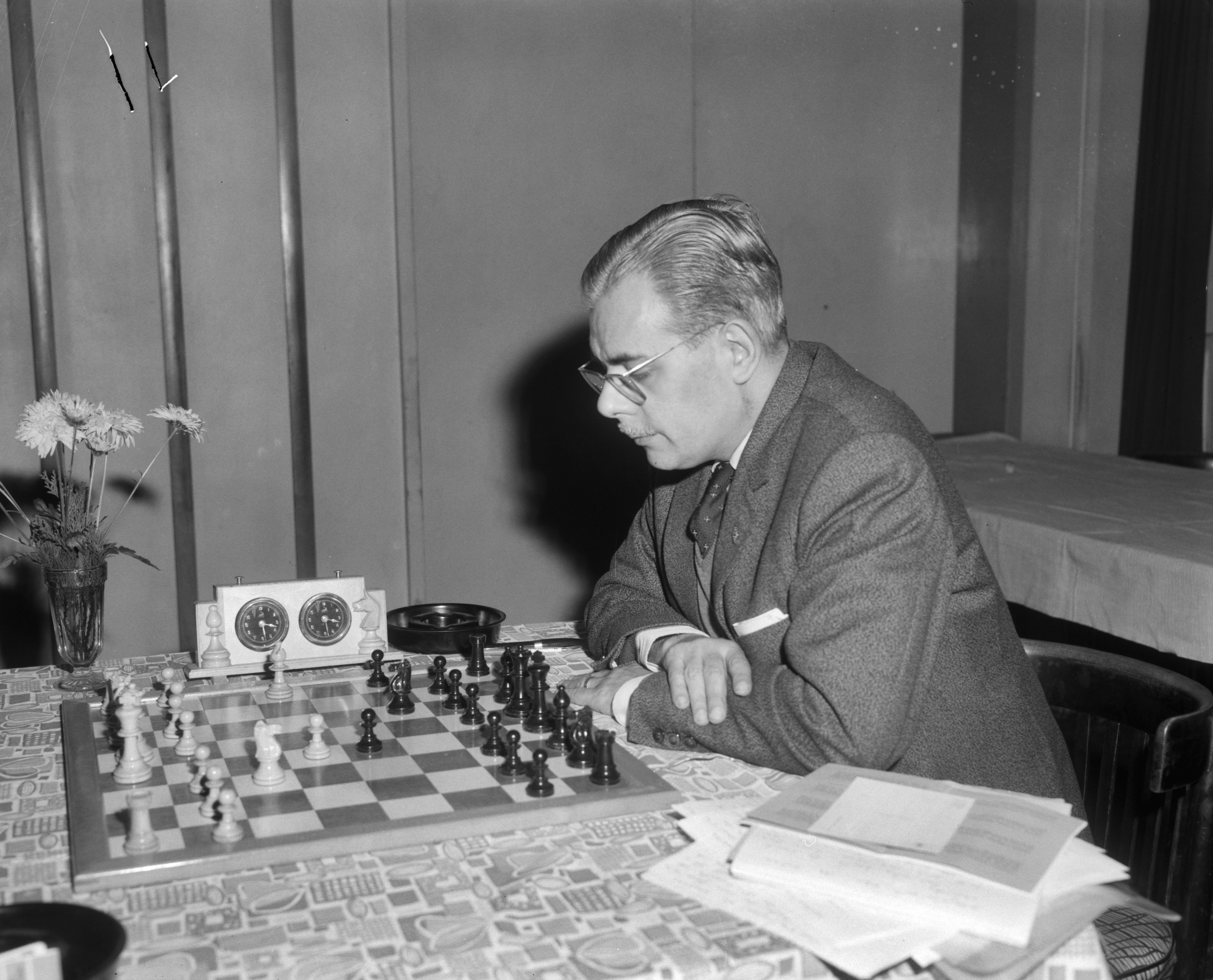
Antonio Medina García (1965)

Antonio Ángel Medina García (2 October 1919, Barcelona – 31 October 2003, Barcelona) was a Spanish chess master.

He was seven times Spanish Champion (1944, 1945, 1947, 1949, 1952, 1963, and 1964), and thrice Catalan Champion (1947, 1949, 1950). He also thrice won Venezuelan Chess Championship in 1955, 1956 and 1958. Medina won at Caracas 1954 (zonal), and took 19th at Goteborg 1955 (interzonal, David Bronstein won).

Medina was awarded the International Master (IM) title in 1950.
