= Venezuelan Chess Championship =

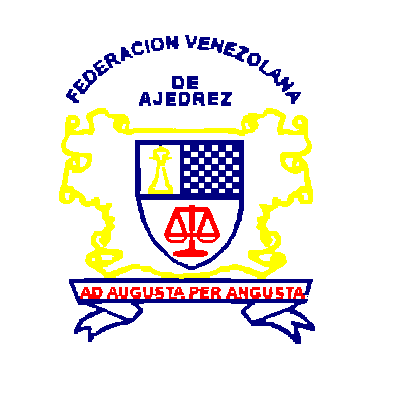
Federación Venezolana de Ajedrez logo

The first Venezuelan Chess Championship took place in February 1891 when Rafael Ruíz defeated Rafael Pittaluga in a match for the title (+7 =2 –4). In the second match, Rafael Ruíz drew with Carlos Perret Gentil (+7 =6 –7) in 1894.

Carlos Perret Gentil won the Venezuelan Championship in 1907, and defended the title until 1936, when he died. The first national championship organized by Federación Venezolana de Ajedrez (FVA) was held in 1938. Jaime Bograd (from Romania) won, ahead of Sady Loynaz Páez (from Venezuela), but the second one became a national Venezuelan Champion. He defended the title in matches against Manuel Acosta Silva (Caracas, 1939), José León García Díaz (Maracaibo, 1943), Omar Benítez (Caracas, 1944) and Héctor Estévez (Caracas, 1946). Sady Loynaz died in 1950, and Federación Venezolana de Ajedrez had organized two separate tournaments (Campeonato Nacional and Campeonato de Extranjeros for foreigners who resided in Venezuela) in Caracas in December 1950. The first tournament was won by Julio García, ahead of Irwin Perret Gentil, and the second one – Gerardo Budowski (from France), ahead of Andrés Sadde (from Latvia).

In 1951, Gerardo Budowski, (Campeón de los Extranjeros), beat Julio García, (Campeón Nacional de Venezuela) 6–0, in a match for the Campeón Absoluto de Venezuela title. The biggest winners of the national championship are László Tapasztló (6), Julio Ostos (5), Félix Ynojosa (5), Eduardo Iturrizaga (4) Johann Álvarez (4) and Alberto Caro (4).

== Winners ==
Year	Winner
1891–1906	Rafael Ruíz, Campeón Nacional oficioso
1907–1936	Carlos Perret Gentil, Campeón Nacional oficioso
1938–1950	Sady Loynaz Páez, Primer Campeón Nacional Federado
1951	Gerardo Budowski (Campeón Absoluto); Julio García (Campeón National)
1952-53	Eduardo Ortega
1954	Andrés Sadde
1955	Antonio Medina
1956	Antonio Medina
1957	not held
1958	Antonio Medina
1959	not held
1960	Salvador Diaz
1961	(Napoleón) Alberto Caro
1962	Manuel Belmonte
1963	(Napoleón) Alberto Caro
1964	Laszlo Tapaszto
1965	Wasil Letchinsky
1966	Laszlo Tapaszto
1967	Juan Robles
1968	(Napoleón) Alberto Caro
1969	Geber Villarroel
1970	Anibal Gamboa
1971	Laszlo Tapaszto
1972	(Napoleón) Alberto Caro
1973	(Napoleón) Alberto Caro
1974	Julio Ostos
1975	Francisco Carreras
1976	Antonio Palacios
1977	Jorge Cuellar
1978	Salvador Diaz
1979	Rodrigo Fontecilla, Rafael Escalante
1980	Julio Ostos
1981	not held
1982	not held
1983	Laszlo Tapaszto
1984	José Luis Guerra
1985	Julio Ostos
1986	not held
1987	Julio Ostos
1988	Hernando Guzmán
1989	Without information
1990	Laszlo Tapaszto
1991	Noel Navas
1992	not held
1993	not held
1994	Juan Rohl
1995	Laszlo Tapaszto
1996	Alexander Hernández
1997	Oliver Soto
1998	Johann Álvarez
1999	Juan Rohl
2000	Julio Ostos
2001	Johann Álvarez
2002	not held
2003	not held
2004	not held
2005	Eduardo Iturrizaga
2006	Eduardo Iturrizaga
2007	Eduardo Iturrizaga
2008	Eduardo Iturrizaga
2009	Johann Álvarez
2010	Pedro Martinez
2011	Félix Ynojosa
2012	Félix Ynojosa
2013	Félix Ynojosa
2014	Félix Ynojosa
2015	José Rafael Gascón del Nogal
2016	Jaime José Romero Barreto
2017	Reivis Gabriel Brizuela Abreu
2018	Interim champions: Johann Alvarez, Oscar Zavarce and Franklin Palomo
2019	Covid-19 pandemic started. Interim champions: José Rafael Gascón del Nogal, Alvaro Dias Huizar and Pedro Ramón Martínez Reyes
2020	Franklyn Annervys Palomo
2021-2022	Kevin Sánchez Álvarez
2023-2024	Félix Ynojosa
