= Silvia Carolina Mazariegos =

Guatemalan chess player (born 1961)

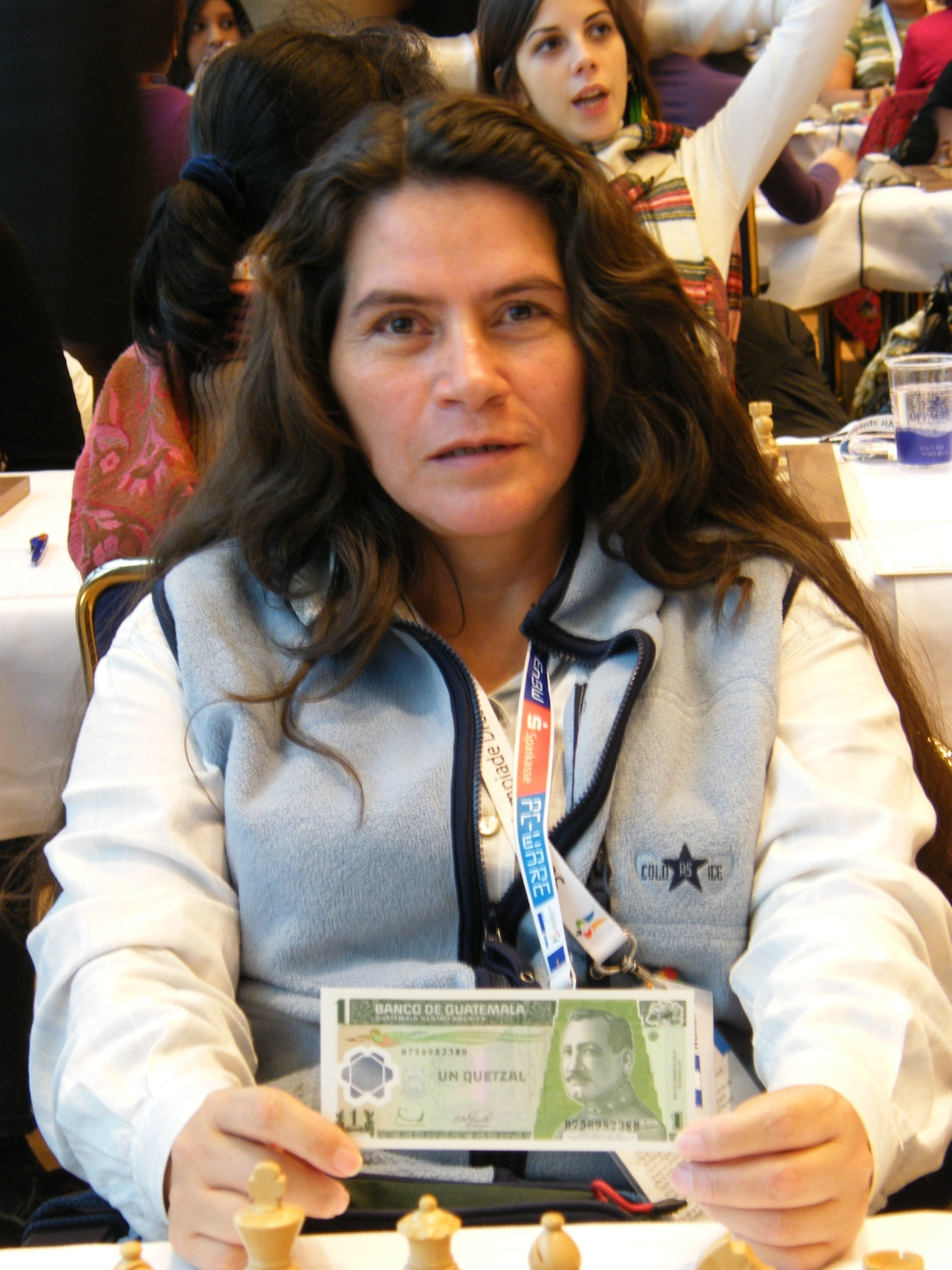

Personal information
- Born: 4 April 1961 (age 65)

Chess career
- Country: Guatemala
- Title: Woman International Master (1987)
- Peak rating: 2135 (April 2005)

Silvia Carolina Mazariegos Kummerfeldt (born 4 April 1961) is a Guatemalan Woman International Master (WIM) since 1987. Her highest rating was 2135 (in April 2005) and she is ranked as Guatemala's 2nd best female player.

She is the champion of the Guatemalan women chess championship 22 times in the years: 1981 -1994, 2001, 2002, 2009, 2011, 2014, 2015, 2019.

She participated with the Guatemalan team in the Chess Olympiads in the years: 1984–1986, 2000, 2004–2012.

In September 2025, her chess.com account was banned for violating their fair play policies in a prize event or casual play on a second chance account.
