= Mazariegos =

- municipality
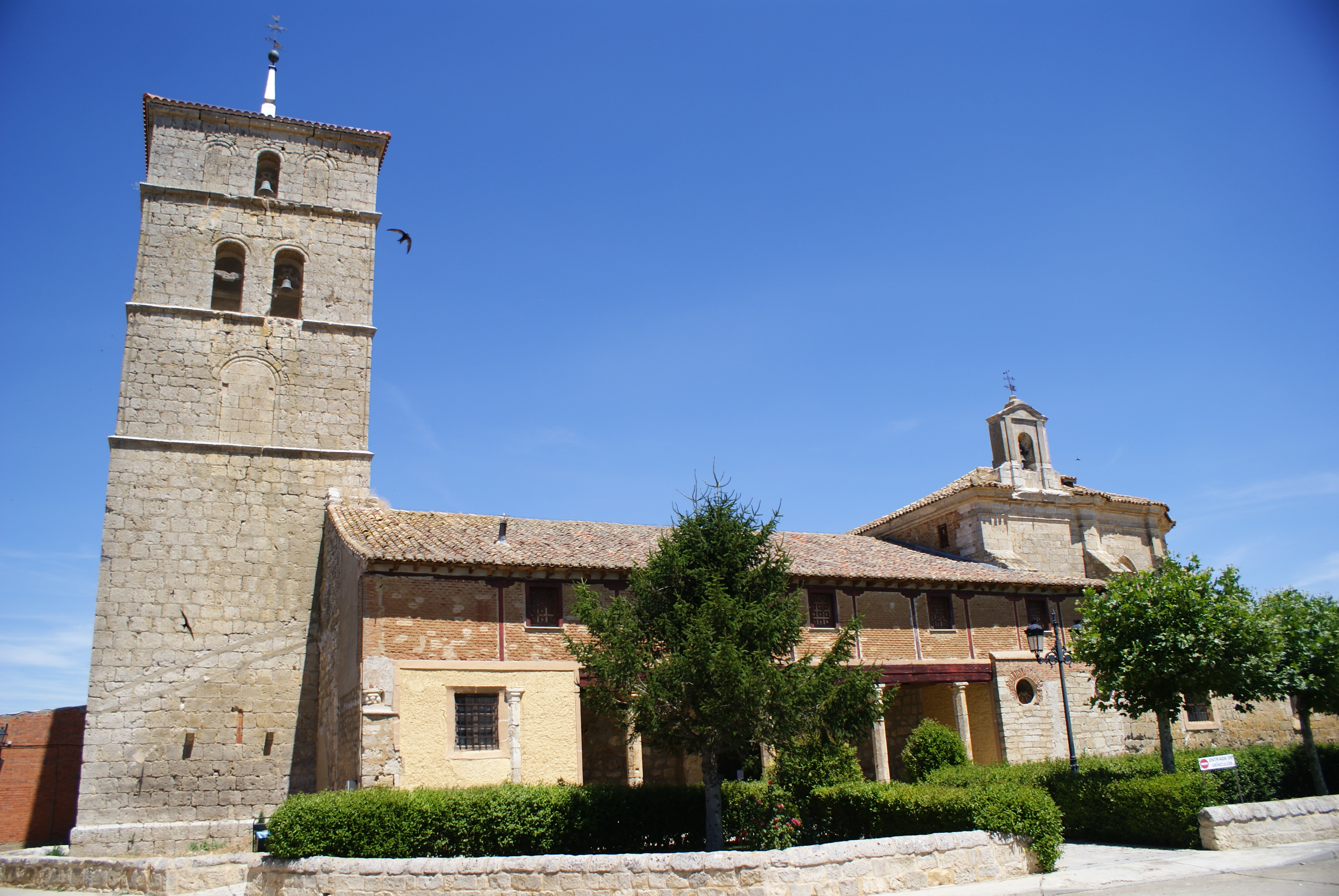

- Flag Coat of arms
- Interactive map of Mazariegos
- Coordinates: 42.0264°N 4.7156°W
- Country: Spain
- Autonomous community: Castile and León
- Province: Palencia
- Municipality: Mazariegos

Area
  - Total: 25 km^{2} (9.7 sq mi)

Population (2025-01-01)
  - Total: 202
  - Density: 8.1/km^{2} (21/sq mi)
- Time zone: UTC+1 (CET)
  - Summer (DST): UTC+2 (CEST)
- Website: Official website

Mazariegos is a municipality located in the province of Palencia, Castile and León, Spain. According to the 2004 census (INE), the municipality has a population of 267 inhabitants.
