= Bogusław Sygulski =

Polish chess player (1957–2017)

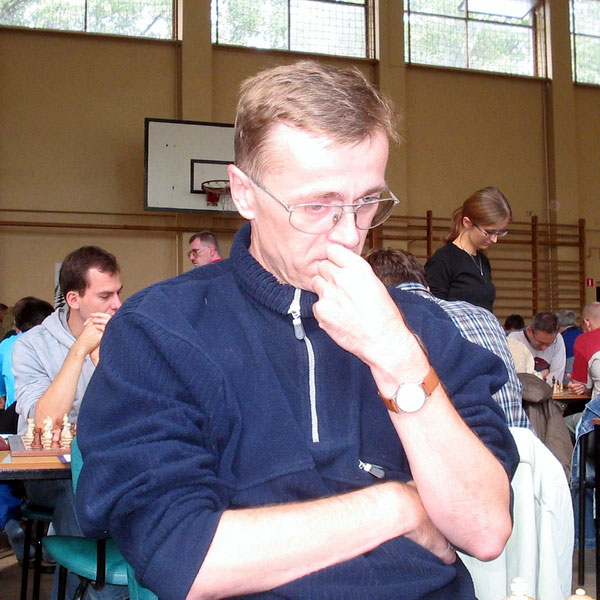
- Bogusław Sygulski in 2006

Personal information
- Born: 10 August 1957 Praszka, Poland
- Died: 18 December 2017 (aged 60)

Chess career
- Country: Poland
- Title: International Master (1988)
- Peak rating: 2390 (July 1985)

Bogusław Sygulski (10 August 1957 – 18 December 2017) was a Polish chess International Master (1988).

== Biography ==
In 1984, Bogusław Sygulski with chess club Legion Warszawa won Polish Team Chess Championship. In 1985 in Gdynia he ranked 7th in Polish Chess Championship. In the next year, in Kalisz, Bogusław Sygulski won the silver medal of the Polish Blitz Chess Championship and won the title of chess champion of Polish People's Army. In 1988 he took 2nd place in the Open chess tournament in Gdynia and won (together with Ryszard Skrobek) in the tournament in Dębica.

Bogusław Sygulski reached his career highest rating on July 1, 1985, with a score of 2390 points, and was then 16th –19th place among Polish chess players.

== Private life ==
Bogusław Sygulski was father of three children: Paweł, Anna and Piotr. His brother Artur, also a chess player, vice-champion of Poland in 1982 and three-time olympic player.

Bogusław Sygulski is buried in the parish cemetery in Czarna (Dębica County).
