= Carlos Armando Juárez Flores =

Guatemalan chess player (born 1963)

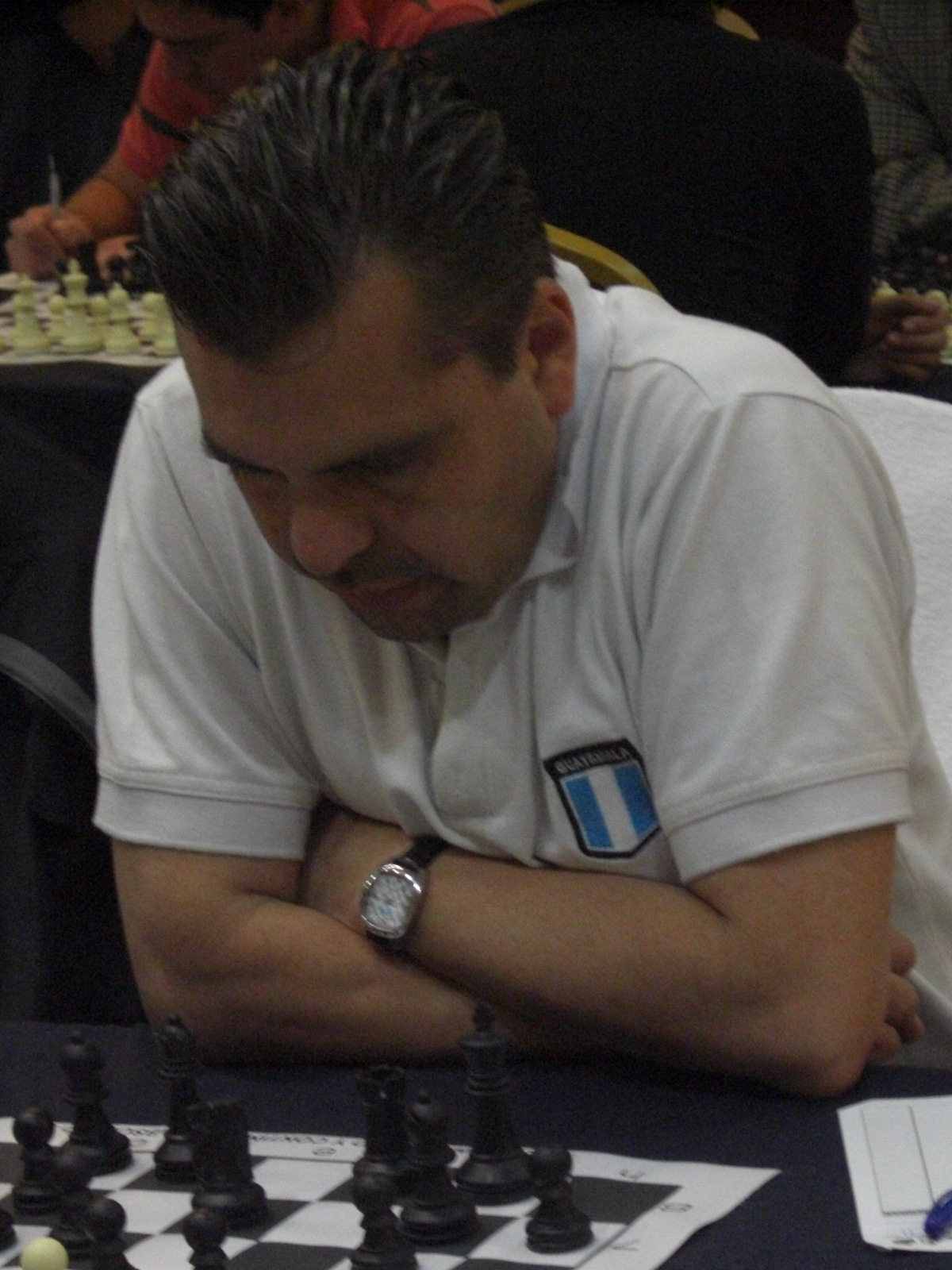
Carlos Armando Juárez Flores

Carlos Armando Juárez Flores (born 21 July 1963) is a Guatemalan chess International Master (IM) since 1988 and a FIDE master (FM) since 1983, and his highest rating was 2435 (January 1998). He is ranked best player in Guatemala.

He won the Guatemalan Chess Championship 27 times, in the years 1980, 1983–1988, 1991, 1993–1995, 1998–2011, 2012, and 2014–2017.
