= 26th Chess Olympiad =

1984 chess tournament in Thessaloniki, Greece

The 26th Chess Olympiad (Greek: Η 26η Σκακιστική Ολυμπιάδα, I 26i Skakistikí Olympiáda), organized by FIDE and comprising an open and a women's tournament, as well as several other events designed to promote the game of chess, took place between November 18 and December 5, 1984, in Thessaloniki, Greece.

In the home country of the Olympic movement, it was business as usual. The Soviet Union, led by Beliavsky, won their third consecutive gold medals (and 15th in total), well ahead of England (helped by a Nunn in top form) and the United States. This dominance happened even in the absence of Karpov and Kasparov who were in the midst of their marathon match. In fact, for the first time in Olympic history, the Soviet team didn't feature a single world champion – past, present or future.

The only champion present in Thessaloniki was Boris Spassky who had defected and now represented France. His performance helped the French team to an unprecedented 7th-place finish, even though he drew 12 of his 14 games – an Olympic record.

After the successful 26th Olympiad in Thessaloniki in 1984, FIDE agreed to hold every other Olympiad (the ones in Olympic years) in the home country of the Olympic movement - provided the Greek Chess Federation and government could provide the necessary funding. This was only the case once, in 1986; after that the Olympiad went back to a new host city every two years.

== Open event ==
There were 87 nations playing in a 14-round Swiss system tournament. To make for an even number of teams, the Greek hosts also fielded a "B" team. In the event of a draw, the tie-break was decided first by using the Buchholz system, then by match points.

Open event
#	Country	Players	Average rating	Points
1	Soviet Union	Beliavsky, Polugaevsky, Vaganian, Tukmakov, Yusupov, Sokolov	2610	41
2	England	Miles, Nunn, Speelman, Chandler, Mestel, Short	2556	37
3	United States	Dzindzichashvili, Kavalek, Christiansen, Browne, Alburt, De Firmian	2553	35

#	Country	Average rating	Points	Buchholz
4	Hungary	2596	34½	
5	Romania	2470	33	
6	West Germany	2516	32½	445.0
7	France	2485	32½	442.0
8	Yugoslavia	2561	32	457.5
9	Bulgaria	2470	32	447.5
10	Netherlands	2574	32	446.0
11	Cuba	2473	32	444.5
12	China	2433	32	429.0
13	Israel	2468	32	425.5
14	Argentina	2401	32	423.5
15	Iceland	2514	31½	450.0
16	Philippines	2426	31½	425.0
17	Czechoslovakia	2555	31	435.0
18	Denmark	2458	31	420.5
19	Brazil	2410	31	418.5
20	Canada	2423	31	412.0
21	Poland	2449	30½	418.0
22	Australia	2426	30½	416.0
23	Chile	2423	30½	412.0
24	Scotland	2325	30½	403.0
25	Sweden	2503	30	454.5
26	Colombia	2409	30	431.0
27	Spain	2451	30	430.5
28	Italy	2406	30	421.0
29	Indonesia	2398	30	413.0
30	Norway	2438	30	411.5
31	Greece	2399	30	408.0
32	Portugal	2349	30	407.5
33	India	2409	29½	420.0
34	Turkey	2365	29½	396.0
35	United Arab Emirates	2286	29½	389.5
36	Wales	2313	29½	382.0
37	Morocco	2200	29½	364.0
38	Austria	2380	29	416.5
39	Finland	2438	29	416.0
40	Belgium	2324	29	414.5
41	Albania	2333	29	410.0
42	Singapore	2324	29	407.0
43	Mexico	2330	29	402.0
44	New Zealand	2293	29	392.0
45	Greece "B"	2318	29	379.0
46	Egypt	2249	28½	403.0
47	Dominican Republic	2291	28½	396.5
48	Tunisia	2278	28	
49	Switzerland	2385	27½	412.5
50	Malaysia	2285	27½	401.0
51	Sri Lanka	2283	27½	392.5
52	Puerto Rico	2236	27½	380.5
53	Pakistan	2255	27	388.5
54	Hong Kong	2274	27	375.5
55	Iraq	2200	27	367.0
56	Ireland	2230	26½	395.5
57	Paraguay	2275	26½	392.5
58	Algeria	2201	26½	384.5
59	Cyprus	2226	26½	368.5
60	Uganda	2203	26½	332.5
61	Thailand	2271	26	389.5
62	Bangladesh	2280	26	388.5
63	Faroe Islands	2229	26	382.5
64	Andorra	2203	26	370.0
65	Malta	2230	26	364.0
66	Lebanon	2226	26	362.5
67	Honduras	2200	26	355.5
68	Luxembourg	2215	25½	373.0
69	Bahrain	2201	25½	314.0
70	Zimbabwe	2234	25	383.0
71	Trinidad and Tobago	2203	25	368.0
72	Nigeria	2201	25	355.0
73	Suriname	2200	25	346.5
74	Libya	2200	25	326.0
75	Kenya	2201	25	324.5
76	Jordan	2203	24½	351.5
77	Jamaica	2205	24½	333.0
78	Angola	2200	24	355.5
79	Guernsey and Jersey	2201	24	352.0
80	British Virgin Islands	2218	24	342.0
81	Papua New Guinea	2203	24	331.5
82	Japan	2200	23½	
83	United States Virgin Islands	2215	21½	
84	Monaco	2201	21	
85	Bermuda	2208	17½	
86	Mali	2200	17	
87	San Marino	2200	16	
88	Palestine	2200	13	

=== Individual medals ===
For the first time, in addition to the performance awards on each board, a special award was given to the best overall performance rating.

- Performance rating: (England) John Nunn 2868
- Board 1: (United States Virgin Islands) Craig Van Tilbury 9½ / 11 = 86.4%
- Board 2: (England) John Nunn 10 / 11 = 90.9%
- Board 3: (Soviet Union) Rafael Vaganian 8½ / 10 = 85.0%
- Board 4: (Thailand) Pricha Sinprayoon 8 / 10 = 80.0%
- 1st reserve: (Suriname) Dewperkash Gajadin, (Hungary) József Pintér, (Spain) Javier Ochoa de Echagüen, and (England) Jonathan Mestel 7 / 9 = 77.8%
- 2nd reserve: (Guernsey) (Jersey) Gorden Comben and (Cyprus) Marios Schinis 7½ / 10 = 75.0%

== Women's event ==
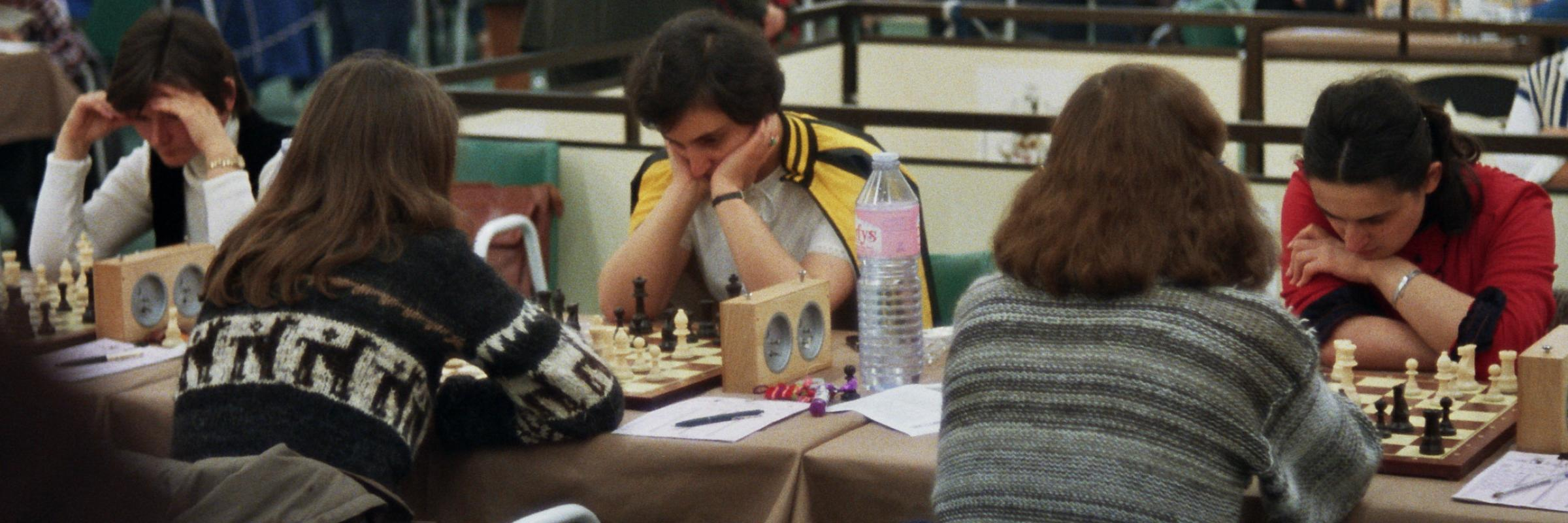
The winning Soviet Union team, left to right: Semenova, Levitina, Chiburdanidze.

50 nations took part, and with the Greek hosts also fielding a "B" side, the total number of teams came to 51. In the event of a draw, the tie-break was decided first by using the Buchholz system, then by match points.

Like the open event, the women's tournament was dominated by the Soviet Union, captained by world champion Chiburdanidze, who won the gold medals by an impressive 5½ points. Bulgaria and Romania took silver and bronze, respectively.

#	Country	Players	Average rating	Points
1	Soviet Union	Chiburdanidze, Levitina, Gaprindashvili, Semenova	2335	32
2	Bulgaria	Voiska, Gocheva, Chilingirova, Savova	2105	27½
3	Romania	Mureșan, Polihroniade, Nuțu, Olărașu	2180	27

#	Country	Average rating	Points	Buchholz
4	West Germany	2232	26	340.5
5	China	2098	26	335.0
6	Hungary	2218	25	
7	Poland	2227	24½	345.5
8	England	2137	24½	336.0
9	Yugoslavia	2162	24	340.5
10	Spain	2055	24	330.0
11	Netherlands	2075	23½	346.5
12	Switzerland	2072	23½	316.5
13	United States	2077	23½	316.0
14	Cuba	2092	23½	303.0
15	Sweden	2143	23	
16	India	2018	22½	
17	Canada	2020	22	316.5
18	France	1985	22	308.5
19	Brazil	1963	22	303.5
20	Scotland	1908	22	299.5
21	Portugal	1800	22	250.0
22	Colombia	1913	21½	311.0
23	Wales	1953	21½	301.5
24	Denmark	1855	21½	288.0
25	Dominican Republic	1800	21½	257.5
26	Norway	1800	21½	244.5
27	Greece	1988	21	316.5
28	Iceland	1873	21	301.5
29	Italy	1903	21	292.5
30	Austria	1893	21	283.5
31	Finland	1900	21	281.0
32	Malaysia	1800	21	260.5
33	Indonesia	1855	20½	300.5
34	Australia	1927	20½	296.0
35	Argentina	1955	20½	292.0
36	Greece "B"	1853	20½	269.5
37	Belgium	1800	20½	267.0
38	Ireland	1800	20½	245.0
39	Mexico	1820	20	286.0
40	New Zealand	1803	20	226.5
41	Japan	1915	19½	274.5
42	Turkey	1892	19½	265.0
43	Iraq	1800	19½	218.0
44	Egypt	1828	18½	268.5
45	Guatemala	1800	18½	253.0
46	United Arab Emirates	1800	16½	
47	Hong Kong	1800	15½	
48	Trinidad and Tobago	1835	15	
49	Jamaica	1800	10	
50	Zimbabwe	1800	8½	
51	United States Virgin Islands	1800	3½	

=== Individual medals ===
- Performance rating: (Soviet Union) Lidia Semenova 2505
- Board 1: (Sweden) Pia Cramling 10½ / 13 = 80.0%
- Board 2: (Canada) Céline Roos 9½ / 13 = 73.1%
- Board 3: (Brazil) Jussara Chaves 9 / 10 = 90.0%
- Reserve: (Soviet Union) Lidia Semenova 9½ / 10 = 95.0%
