= 24th Chess Olympiad =

1980 chess tournament in Valletta, Malta

Official logo of the Olympiad.

The 24th Chess Olympiad (Maltese: L-24 Olimpijadi taċ-Ċess), organized by FIDE and comprising an open and a women's tournament, as well as several other events designed to promote the game of chess, took place between November 20 and December 6, 1980, at the Mediterranean Conference Centre in Valletta, Malta.

Once again, the defending champions Hungary proved to be a real match for the Soviet favourites. The Hungarians led the table until the last round, but in the end the two teams tied for first place. The Soviet Union had a slightly better tie break score and took back the gold medals after six years. Yugoslavia completed the medal ranks.

The Soviet team was captained by the reigning world champion Karpov (who fell ill during the tournament and didn't perform to his usual standard) and featured a former champion (Tal) as well as a future one: 17-year-old Olympic debutant Kasparov, who in his first appearance took a bronze medal on the 2nd reserve board.

The Buchholz points deciding the gold medal between the Soviet Union and Hungary were determined by the Scotland-Greece match in the last round. Members of the Hungarian team maintain to this day that Kasparov illegally advised the Greek players during the match whom eventually won 3.5 - 0.5 and thus the Soviet team got the better tie break than Hungary. Earlier in the last round Kasparov reached only a draw against Denmark's Jacob Øst-Hansen, and was allegedly scolded by Viktor Baturinsky the vice chairman of the Soviet Chess Federation.

== Open event ==
A total of 81 nations played a 14-round Swiss system tournament. To make for an even number of teams, the Maltese hosts also fielded a "B" team. In the event of a draw, the tie-break was decided first by using the Buchholz system, then by match points.

Open event
#	Country	Players	Average rating	Points	Buchholz	MP
1	Soviet Union	Karpov, Polugaevsky, Tal, Geller, Balashov, Kasparov	2666	39	449.5	
2	Hungary	Portisch, Ribli, Sax, Csom, Faragó, Pintér	2593	39	448.0	
3	Yugoslavia	Ljubojević, Ivkov, Parma, Kurajica, Marjanović, Nikolić	2541	35		
4	United States	Alburt, Seirawan, Christiansen, Tarjan, de Firmian, Shamkovich	2514	34		
5	Czechoslovakia	Hort, Smejkal, Jansa, Plachetka, Ftáčnik, Lechtýnský	2530	33		
6	England	Miles, Stean, Nunn, Speelman, Keene, Mestel	2520	32½	453.0	
7	Poland	Sznapik, W. Schmidt, Kuligowski, Bielczyk, Pokojowczyk, Przewoźnik	2419	32½	424.0	
8	Israel	Liberzon, Birnboim, Y. Gruenfeld, Murey, Kagan, D. Bernstein	2474	32	439.0	
9	Canada	Hébert, Day, Yanofsky, Vukadinov, Vranesic, Allan	2385	32	410.5	
10	Netherlands	Timman, Sosonko, Ree, Langeweg, van der Wiel, Ligterink	2533	31½	449.5	
11	Romania	Gheorghiu, Ciocâltea, Șubă, Ghindă, Ghițescu, Stoica	2503	31½	437.5	
12	Sweden	Andersson, L. Karlsson, Schneider, Schüssler, Wedberg, Renman	2473	31½	434.0	
13	Cuba	García Gonzáles, García Martínez, Rodríguez Céspedes, Nogueiras, Hernández, Vera González	2468	31½	424.5	
14	Argentina	Quinteros, Rubinetti, Debarnot, Schweber, Giardelli, Hase	2454	31	439.0	
15	Philippines	Torre, Mascariñas, R. Rodríguez, Pacis, Bernal, Ramos	2390	31	430.5	
16	Denmark	Jakobsen, Høi, Fedder, Mortensen, Øst-Hansen, Pedersen	2408	31	427.5	
17	France	Haïk, Giffard, Seret, L. Roos, Goldenberg, D. Roos	2381	31	415.0	
18	Wales	Williams, Cooper, Hutchings, Jones, Johnston	2325	31	395.0	
19	Bulgaria	Ermenkov, Tringov, Radulov, Georgiev, Popov, Spasov	2473	30½	454.0	
20	Finland	Westerinen, Rantanen, Hurme, Ristoja, Mäki, Pirttimäki	2401	30½	431.0	
21	Austria	Robatsch, Hölzl, Herzog, Roth, Wittmann, Wagner	2381	30½	414.0	
22	Italy	Tóth, Zichichi, Taruffi, Passerotti, Trabattoni, Iannaccone	2334	30½	409.0	
23	Iceland	F. Ólafsson, H. Ólafsson, Árnason, Pétursson, Hjartarson, Jóhannsson	2474	30	434.5	
24	Norway	Helmers, Heim, Hoen, Moen, Tiller, Sande	2369	30	421.5	
25	Germany	Pfleger, Hecht, Borik, Lobron, Hermann, Kunsztowicz	2451	30	420.0	
26	Spain	Díez del Corral, Bellón López, Pomar, Rivas Pastor, Sanz Alonso, Gómez Esteban	2425	30	416.5	
27	Greece	Makropoulos, Skembris, Skalkotas, Pountsas, Natsis, Trikaliotis	2365	30	402.5	
28	Venezuela	Ostos, Fernández, Palacios, Dounia, Escalante	2311	30	399.5	
29	Brazil	Sunye Neto, Carvalho, Lucena, van Riemsdijk, Câmara, Gentil	2374	30	397.0	
30	Syria	Catalan, Hakki, Beitar, Arafeh, Kassabe	2235	30	394.5	
31	Switzerland	Hug, Wirthensohn, Huss, Hammer, Züger, Franzoni	2391	29½		
32	Colombia	García, Zapata, Castro, Cuartas, Acosta, González Rodríguez	2423	29	419.0	
33	Albania	Muço, Adhami, Pustina, Zadrima, Qendro, Karkanaqe	2319	29	415.5	
34	Australia	Rogers, Jamieson, Johansen, Fuller, Shaw, West	2361	29	410.5	
35	India	Ravi Sekhar, Ravikumar, Khan, Meetei, Hassan	2325	29	410.0	
36	Chile	Morovic, Campos Moreno, Cifuentes, Silva Sánchez, Donoso Velasco, Velasquez Ojeda	2388	29	408.5	
37	Mexico	Frey Beckman, Campos López, Félix Villarreal, Maya, Ocampo, Navarro	2359	29	396.0	
38	China	Liu Wenzhe, Qi Jingxuan, Liang Jinrong, Li Zunian, Tang Hongjian	2380	28½	411.5	
39	Portugal	Silva, Fernandes, J. Santos, L. Santos, Durão	2351	28½	406.0	
40	Belgium	Meulders, De Bruycker, Deleyn, Goormachtigh, Defize, Schumacher	2233	28½	395.0	
41	Ireland	Delaney, Dunne, Doyle, Ludgate, Curtin, McCarthy	2255	28½	391.5	
42	Thailand	Chaivichit, Sinprayoon, Trisa-Ard, Darakorn	2225	28½	390.0	
43	Pakistan	Mirza, Farooqui, Zafar, Chaudry, Ahmad, Rana	2238	28½	372.5	
44	Dominican Republic	Álvarez, Abreu, Gonzáles, Mateo, Pérez Nivar	2258	28	399.0	
45	Indonesia	Handoko, Suradiradja, Arif, Ardiansyah, Gunawan, Kusnadi	2354	28	397.5	
46	Mongolia	Myagmarsuren, Tumurbator, Jigjidsuren, Lhagva	2328	27½	402.5	
47	Paraguay	Gamarra Cáceres, Ferreira, Bogda, Santacruz	2255	27½	387.0	
48	Turkey	İpek, Gümrükçüoğlu, Öney, Süer, Pamuk	2259	27½	384.5	
49	Malaysia	Liew Chee Meng, Foo Lum Choon, Chang Hing Wah, Cheah Woon Leng, Abdul Rahman	2200	27½	378.0	
50	Trinidad and Tobago	Lee, Raphael, Duchesne, Lee, Mohipp, Ramon-Fortune	2200	27½	370.5	
51	Scotland	Pritchett, Swanson, Upton, McNab, Norris, Bonner	2291	27	423.5	
52	Japan	Gonda, Takemoto, T. Shiraki, Sakurai, T. Hirata, Sugimoto	2213	27	373.0	
53	Guyana	M. Broomes, G. Broomes, Wharton, R. Austin, J. Macedo	2203	26½	369.0	13
54	Luxembourg	Haas, Feller, Stull, Schammo, Specchio, Kirsch	2230	26½	369.0	12
55	Algeria	Baghli, Cherrad, Slimani, Kharchi, R. Bounedjar, Belamine	2200	26½	351.0	
56	New Zealand	Chandler, Sarapu, Small, Aptekar, Anderson	2336	26	401.0	
57	Lebanon	Kouatly, Sursock, Abouchaaya, Khechen, N. Saade	2243	26	389.5	
58	Tunisia	Bouaziz, Belkadi, Hmadi, Ouechtati, Doghri, L. Hamzaoui	2279	26	387.5	
59	Egypt	Soliman, Fatin, El-Said, Afifi, Sadek, Hamed	2200	25½	391.0	
60	United Arab Emirates	N. A. Said, S. A. Said, N. M. Said, Ghubash, Qasim, Saleh	2200	25½	379.0	
61	Malta	Attard, Camilleri, Gouder, Sollars, Gauci, G. Borg	2226	25½	376.5	
62	Zimbabwe	Donnely, Barlow, V. Strugo, Levy, Kuwaza, T. Klement	2200	25½	369.5	
63	Puerto Rico	M. Colón Romero, Ochoa, Moraza Choisme, Vázquez Ramos, Sosa, Falcón	2201	25½	357.0	
-	Malta "B"	Cilia Vincenti, Vella Gera, Psaila, Thake, Vasallo, A. Borg	2200	25½	355.5	
64	Jamaica	Wheeler, Powell, A. Niederhoffer, Cameron	2200	25½	348.5	
65	United States Virgin Islands	Van Tilbury, R. Grim, Grumer, Turner, Chiu Yum San, D. Delzell	2233	25½	333.0	
66	Hong Kong	Kan Wai Shui, Lin, Chao, Luk Luen Wah, M. Camm, R. Murphy	2235	25	349.0	
67	Guernsey	Fulton, Blow, Newman, Knight, Lainé, Bisson	2200	25	345.0	
68	Jordan	S. Bukhari, Bakr, M. Bukhari, Kilani, Arafat	2200	25	323.5	
69	Cyprus	Martidis, Riza, Aristotelous, Hadjiyiannis, Kleopas	2200	24½	356.0	
70	Kenya	Kanani, Adam, Yongo, Donde, Kinyanjui, S. Oulo	2200	24½	318.5	
71	Nigeria	Omuku, Agusto, O. Faseyitan, E. Awobokun, O. Ayoola	2200	23½	361.0	
72	Faroe Islands	Ziska, Apol, Vilhelm, Midjord, Joensen	2200	24½	355.0	
73	Andorra	Santamaría Mas, Clua Ballague, J. A. Pantebre Martínez, De la Casa, Gómez Abad, B. Pantebre Martínez	2200	23½	345.5	
74	Libya	M. Hingary, Tawengi, El-Mejbri, Benohman, Ali Dreibika, Talha	2200	23½	344.0	
75	British Virgin Islands	Hook, Jarecki, Georges, Solomon	2216	23½	326.0	
76	Bermuda	Wojciechowski, Harris, Radford, Chudleigh, Dill, Tee	2200	23	326.0	
77	Zaire	De Vries, Ciezkowski, Buysschaert, Callens, Claeys	2200	23	319.5	
78	Monaco	Caruana, Negro, Girault, Lepine, Bernard, Angles d'Auriac	2200	20½		
79	Papua New Guinea	B. Whyte, F. Conejares, Hothersall, Markov, Marko, Puru	2200	19½		
80	Uganda	Zabasajja, O. Musasira, Mungyereza, Kisubi, Kamuhangire, Kiiza	2200	17½		
81	Angola	Fonseca de Oliveira, Adão Domingos, De Meireles, Ferreira, V. Marques Alves, Saraiva de Carvalho	2200	13½		

=== Individual medals ===
- Board 1: (British Virgin Islands) Bill Hook 11½/14 = 82.1%
- Board 2: (Finland) Yrjö Rantanen 9½/13 = 73.1%
- Board 3: (Mexico) José Félix Villarreal 9/11 = 81.8%
- Board 4: (Hungary) István Csom 7/9 = 77.8%
- 1st reserve: (Soviet Union) Yury Balashov (7½/10) and (Norway) Bjørn Tiller (6/8) = 75.0%
- 2nd reserve: (Socialist Federal Republic of Yugoslavia) Predrag Nikolić 6½/8 = 81.3%

=== Best game ===
The 'Best Game' prize went to Jonathan Mestel (England) - Nils Gustaf Renman (Sweden) from round 13.

== Women's event ==
42 teams took part in the women's event which for the first time was played as a 14-round Swiss system tournament. In the event of a draw, the tie-break was decided first by using the Buchholz system, then by match points.

Like the open event, the women's tournament proved to be a tight affair between the Soviet Union and Hungary, with the Soviet team, captained by world champion Chiburdanidze, winning by half a point. Poland took the bronze.

#	Country	Players	Average rating	Points	Buchholz	MP	Head- to-head
1	Soviet Union	Chiburdanidze, Gaprindashvili, Alexandria, Ioseliani	2370	32½			
2	Hungary	Verőci-Petronić, Ivánka, Porubszky-Angyalosine, Csonkics	2232	32			
3	Poland	Ereńska-Radzewska, Szmacińska, Wiese, Brustman	2148	26½			
4	Romania	Polihroniade, Baumstark, Nuțu, Mureșan	2200	26			
5	West Germany	Fischdick, B. Hund, Laakmann, I. Hund	2152	24	339.5		
6	China	Liu Shilan, Wu Mingqian, An Yangfeng	1843	24	338.5		
7	Israel	Glaz, Kristol, Podrazhanskaya, Nudelman	2113	23½	339.5		
8	Yugoslavia	Marković, Dragašević, Štadler, Prokopović	2142	23½	333.5		
9	Bulgaria	Lematschko, Bojadjieva, Voyska, Angelova	2138	23	340.0		
10	Brazil	Abreu Carvalho, Chaves, Cardoso, Longo	1850	23	300.5		
11	Spain	García Vicente, Ferrer Lucas, García Padrón, Cuevas Rodríguez	2122	22½	331.0		
12	Argentina	Soppe, Arias, Justo, Vázquez	1913	22½	314.0		
13	United States	Savereide, Crotto, Haring, Frenkel	2092	22	334.0		
14	England	Miles, Jackson, Caldwell, Whitehead	2160	22	332.5		
15	France	Merlini, Ruck-Petit, Schall, Legendre	1942	22	312.5		
16	Australia	Mott-McGrath, Hawkesworth, Slavotinek, Martin	1870	22	302.5		
17	Netherlands	Vreeken, Belle, van Parreren, Bruinenberg	2092	21½	323.0		
18	Colombia	Guggenberger, Leyva, Maya de Alzate, Patiño	1888	21½	311.0		
19	Canada	Shterenberg, Roos, Das, Day	1938	21½	305.0	15	2½
20	Italy	Pernici, Gramignani, Merciai, Deghenghi	1935	21½	305.0	15	½
21	Sweden	Borisova-Ornstein, Aatolainen, Nyberg, Samuelsson	1962	21½	297.5		
22	Iceland	Kristinsdóttir, Tráinsdóttir, Friðþjófsdóttir, Norðdahl	1800	21½	279.0		
23	Dominican Republic	García Portes, A. R. Marino, Cuevas	1800	21½	263.5		
24	Greece	Fouriki, A. Efremoglou, Petraki, K. Mihailidou	1800	21½	253.0		
25	India	J. Khadilkar, R. Khadilkar, V. Khadilkar, Thipsay	2075	21	305.5		
26	Ireland	Cronin, Delaney, O'Siochrú, Connolly	1818	21	287.5		
27	Wales	Garwell, Evans, James, Brunker	1930	21	277.0		
28	Scotland	Hindle, Elder, Jackson, Houstoun	1817	20½	286.0		
29	New Zealand	Foster, Stretch, Brightwell, Flower	1800	20½	239.0		
30	Denmark	Thygesen, Haahr, Berg, Larsen	1875	20	291.5		
31	Switzerland	Veprek, Bürgin, Schladetzky, Meyer	1907	20	279.0		
32	Mexico	Camps de Ocampo, Salazar, Escondrillas	1827	20	233.0		
33	Austria	Hennings, Hausner, Samt, Kattinger	1938	19½	291.0		
34	Finland	Sirkka-Liisa Landry, Palasto, Laitinen, Pihlajamäki	1900	19½	283.0		
35	Egypt	Basta Sohair, Izmael, A. Samy Maha, Ibrahim	1800	19½	234.0		
36	Japan	Takahashi, Watai, Nakagawa	1817	19	283.0		
37	Belgium	Careme, De Corte, Schumacher, Loo	1800	19	235.0		
38	Malta	Grech-Sollars, Sciortino, Lentini, Fiott	1800	15			
39	Puerto Rico	Rodríguez Ramírez, Irizarry Adequin, Latorre Vélez, Martorell Martínez	1800	14½			
40	United Arab Emirates	Ahmad, N. Saleh, Karim, Hassan	1800	13½			
41	United States Virgin Islands	Widmer, Quenzel, Grumer	1800	4			
42	Nigeria	Isong, Olusola	1800	1			

=== Individual medals ===
- Board 1: (Soviet Union) Maia Chiburdanidze 11½ / 13 = 88.5%
- Board 2: (Soviet Union) Nona Gaprindashvili 9½ / 12 = 79.2%
- Board 3: (Romania) Daniela Nuțu 7½ / 10 = 75.0%
- Reserve: (Soviet Union) Nana Ioseliani 7½ / 9 = 83.3%
