= León de Greiff =

Colombian poet (1895–1976)

- Born: Francisco de Asís León Bogislao de Greiff Haeusler; July 22, 1895; Medellín, Antioquia, Colombia
- Died: July 11, 1976 (aged 80); Bogotá, D. E., Colombia
- Occupations: Poet, civil servant, diplomat.
- Spouse: María Teresa Matilde Bernal Nicholls (m. 1927 - † 1966)
- Children: Astrid de Greiff Bernal; Boris de Greiff Bernal; Hjalmar de Greiff Bernal; Axel de Greiff Bernal
- Writing career
- Pen name: Leo le Gris, Gaspar de la Nuit
- Language: Spanish
- Period: 1915-1976
- Genre: Poetry
- Subjects: solitude, the tedium of existence, and the past
- Notable work: Tergiversaciones (1925)
- Notable awards: List of Awards Order of the Polar Star – Sweden; 1964 Knight; Order of Boyaca – Colombia; 1965 Commander; National Prize of Literature – Colcultura; 1970; Jorge Zalamea Medal – Calarcá; 1971; Symbolic Axe of Antioquia – Medellín; 1971; Star of Antioquia – Antioquia; 1971 Gold Rank; Civic Medal General Santander – Ministry of National Education; 1971; Premio Antioquia – Coltejer; 1973; Order of San Carlos – Colombia; 1975 Grand Officer
- Movement: Modernismo

Francisco de Asís León Bogislao de Greiff Haeusler (July 22, 1895 – July 11, 1976), was a Colombian poet known for his stylistic innovations and deliberately eclectic use of obscure lexicon. Best known simply as León de Greiff, he often used different pen names. The most popular were Leo le Gris and Gaspar Von Der Nacht. De Greiff was one of the founders of Los Panidas, a literary and artistic group established in 1915 in the city of Medellín.

== Family and background ==
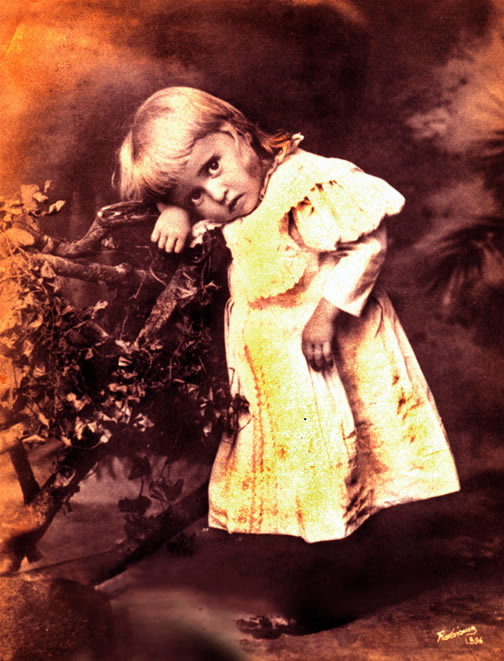
León de Greiff at the age of one. Taken by Melitón Rodríguez Roldán in 1896.

De Greiff was born on July 22, 1895, in the city of Medellín, Colombia to Luis de Greiff Obregón and Amalia Haeusler Rincón^{a}. His father was of Swedish ancestry and was the grandson of Karl Sigismund Fromholt von Greiff^{b}, a Swedish engineer and geographer who moved to Colombia in 1825 and whose family had played an active role in the abdication of King Gustav IV Adolf of Sweden. De Greiff's mother was of German descent, the daughter of Heinrich Häusler^{a} (a German mechanic and cabinetmaker who emigrated to Colombia in 1839). De Greiff was also the great-grandson of Francisco Antonio Obregón Muñoz, who had been Governor of Antioquia between 1836 and 1841.

Greiff was baptized on August 11, 1895, at the Church Parish of Veracruz by Fr. Pedro Alejandrino Zuluaga with the names Francisco de Asís, in honour of Saint Francis of Assisi, and León, in honour of Leo Tolstoy. His godparents were his paternal aunt Rosa Emma de Greiff Obregón and her husband Luis Vásquez Barrientos. Although of mixed Scandinavian-Germanic-Spanish-Criollo heritage, de Greiff's family had a strong Colombian identity and were part of standing mainstream Colombian society. His family background influenced many of his later works. He had four siblings, Leticia, Laura, Otto, and Olaf, and a half brother, Luis Eduardo.

On July 23, 1927, de Greiff married María Teresa Matilde Bernal Nicholls, a Colombian of English descent whom he met through his sister Leticia. They were married in a Roman Catholic ceremony in the Cathedral of Villanueva officiated by fr. Bernardo Jaramillo Arango a mutual friend of both families. Together they had four children: Astrid, an architect; Boris, a renowned chess player; Hjalmar, a cellist and editor; and Axel an architect who resettled in Sweden.

=== Education ===
Greiff was educated at the Lyceum of the University of Antioquia in Medellín and went on to study engineering at the School of Mines of the University of Antioquia. In 1913 the administration expelled him along with other students for claims of being "subversive and disruptive" as a result of the political turmoil of the times and his leftist tendencies and associations. In 1914 he traveled to Bogotá as secretary ad hoc to General Rafael Uribe Uribe, a personal friend of his father. Once in Bogotá, he attended the Free University of Colombia and studied Law. He did not finish his studies, choosing rather to drop out of school and focus on his writings and poetry. As he put it, his decision to move to Bogotá was not to become a lawyer: "It was rather to get to know Bogotá.

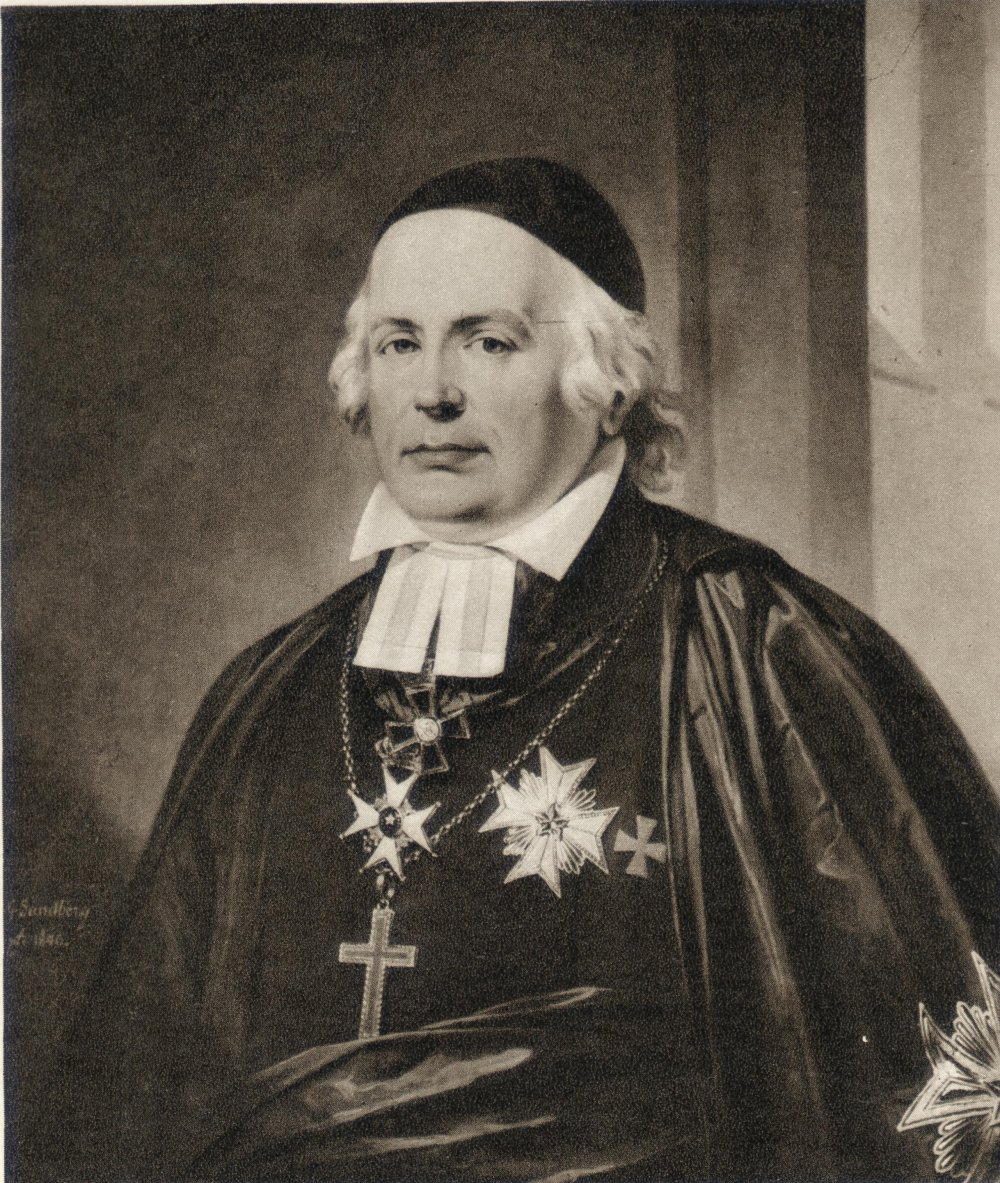
1840 Painting of Wilhelm Faxe, Bishop of Lund, great-great-grandfather of León de Greiff.

== As a poet ==
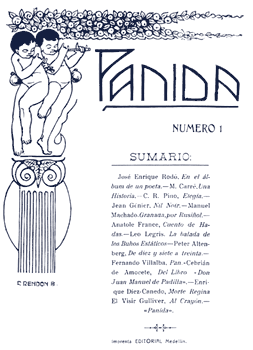
Cover of the 1st issue of Panida featuring de Greiff's first published poem, Ballad of the Mad Owls.

When de Greiff returned to Medellín in 1914, he joined the tertulias that gathered in the local cafés of the city, most prominently the ones that met in the café of the bookstore El Globo. It was there that he became acquainted with the underground cultural movement of his time and began developing and experimenting the style of poetry that would define him later on.

Musicians, rhapsodists, prosodians,
poets, poets, poets,
painters, cartoonists,
erudites, thorough aesthetes;
Romanticists or classicists
and decadents, "if you will"
but yes, madmen and artists
the Panidas were we thirteen!

León de Greiff,

A group of 13 young bohemian artist and writers that formed during that time became known as los Panidas, named after the god Pan, and included future prominent figures in the Literature of Colombia such as de Greiff and Fernando González. The panidas were influenced by the modernist movement in literature, which in Latin America became known as modernismo . This movement aimed to reclaim the already established European standards of art and literature and give it a modern and local character; the panidas thus became the precursors of modernism in Colombia, transforming the foreign and strange into local and tangent. De Greiff often exposed Colombian audiences this way, for example to the mystic land of Vikings and fjords by giving it a familiar antioqueño feel, a combination of the two worlds that were part of de Greiff’s life He also became known for his eclectic use of the language often using a lexicon so unfamiliar to most Spanish speaking audiences of that time that it would sound as if it were a foreign language, and introduced references to obscure or unknown authors and works of art and literature that were not part of standard curricula. Also present in de Greiff’s and the panida’s work was the influence of symbolism, and more significant that of parnassiastic thought, of creating poetry in its purest form to more closely resemble art. De Greiff described the purpose of the panidas in these words:

We were encouraged, above all, by a purpose of renewal. At that time poetry had become too academic. It seemed a mediocre thing, a thing which we must fight against. It was essentially that generational criterion that we were trying to impose.

— León de Greiff

The artistic group published a quincenal literary magazine called Panida in February 1915. This short lived publication of only ten issues was illustrated by Ricardo Rendón first directed by de Greiff, and later by Félix Mejía Arango. De Greiff had its works published for the first time in this magazine under the pen name Leo le Gris, the first one being his Ballad of the Mad Owls.

No sooner had the magazine been published than the Roman Catholic Church in Colombia banned for fear of corrupting the youth with its pernicious and extravagant content. The public reception was not welcoming either, the writing style of de Greiff and the other panidas was at the vanguard of its time, but too far-off from what mundane Colombian society was familiar with. It did however earn the praise and support of prominent Medellín literati such as writer Tomás Carrasquilla and journalist Fidel Cano Gutiérrez.

The magazine went out of circulation in June, mostly due to the dispersion of the panidas. De Greiff moved to Bogotá, and many others went into business leaving their artistic aspirations behind. Others chose the nihilist path of suicide. In 1925, when he published his first book Tergiversaciones, de Greiff dedicated it to the memory of "The 13 Panidas".

=== Los Nuevos ===
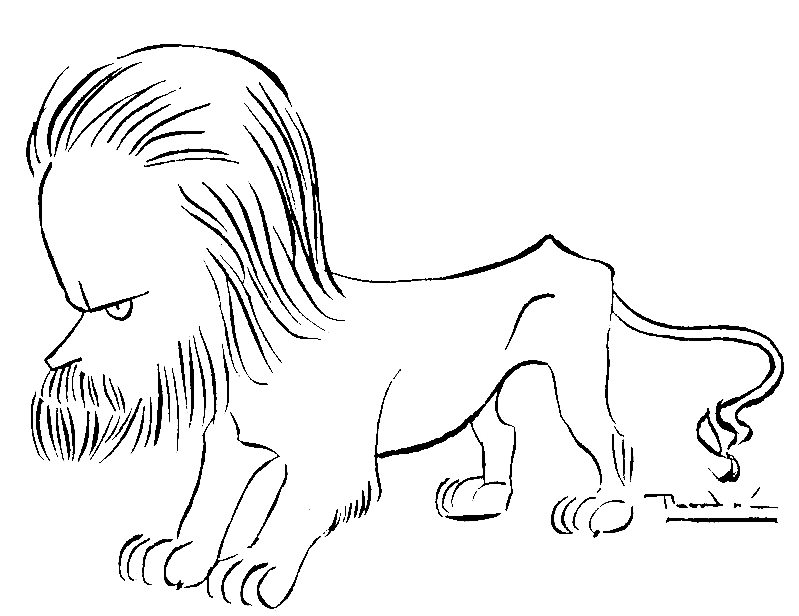
Caricature of León de Greiff by fellow panida Ricardo Rendón.

In 1925 now in Bogotá, de Greiff was now a regular of the tertulias that gathered in the Windsor café and part of the publication of a new vanguard magazine called Los Nuevos (es:The New Ones). Directed by Felipe and Alberto Lleras Camargo, de Greiff worked with other writers such as Jorge Zalamea and Germán Arciniegas among others as regular contributors to the magazine. Los Nuevos was of political, artistic, literary and social content, and aimed to challenge the remnants of exhausted romanticist writings, regionalist politics, and conservative society. This movement followed the path that the panidas had begun in Medellín and that was a representation of modernismo in Colombia much like the ultraist movement in Spain.

Influenced by Vicente Huidobro, de Greiff followed creacionismos standards of poetry, reinventing himself to make each poem unique, translatable, and truly poetic. His poetry is sometimes criticized as standoffish and intricate. He was devoted to the artistic form of poetry.

=== Mamotretos ===
Starting with his first book Tergiversaciones in 1925, every one of his published books of poetry that was directed by him were named in order as mamotretos, which in Spanish loosely refers to a bulky jumbled collection of writings that could be loosely interpreted as a tome. The name was both an example of de Greiff's masterful use of language and his humility towards his work and himself. His eighth and last mamotreto would be Nova et Vetera, published a year before his death, and was a collection of new and old found poems of his from even before Panida.

== Music and Poetry ==
Although de Greiff studied poetry, he had also been influenced by music as a child, and musical qualities guided both his poetry and his prose. Even though he did not follow the same musical path as his brother Otto, his knowledge and love of music drove him to seek and become Professor of Music History at the Conservatory of the National University of Colombia on September 1, 1946. The relationship of his poetry to music has been noted by Stephen C. Mohler in his doctoral thesis (The Poetic Style of León de Greiff, Ann Arbor, Michigan,1969). De Greiff had previously taught at the University from March 1940 to January 1, 1943, as Professor of Literature and Redaction at the Faculty of Engineering

== Civil servant ==
In 1916 de Greiff received his first job as a civil servant, working as an accountant for the Bank of the Republic until 1925. He later worked as a statistician from February 16, 1926, as Manager of Bolombolo-La Pintada Railway Construction Project until June 11, 1927, when he becomes Chief Statistician for the Departmental Directorate of Roads of Antioquia until June 13, 1931, when he moved to Bogotá and becomes Chief Statistician for National Railways on June 15 until January 27, 1945.

From July 1, 1945, to February 28, 1950, he works for the Ministry of National Education working in different posts from Deputy Director of Secondary Education, and Chief of Scholarships, and Director of Cultural Promotion and Fine Arts. As part of an official commission of the Ministry, de Greiff travelled to Mexico City to repatriate the ashes of the poet Porfirio Barba-Jacob; he would again travel outside the country in 1947, when he travels to Lima, Peru as Delegate of the Ministry of National Education to the II Bolivarian Games.

In his role as Director of Cultural Promotion and Fine Arts he co-founds in 1949 with a large group of intellectuals and artists that included Alfonso López Michelsen, Ignacio Gómez Jaramillo and Baldomero Sanín Cano among others, the Colombo-Soviet Cultural Institute with the aim of improving friendship and cultural relations with the Soviet Socialist Republic. That same year on November 21 de Greiff was arrested along with Diego Montaña Cuéllar, Alejandro Vallejo, and Jorge Zalamea for “political reasons” that were never explained. De Greiff had been victim of the political and violent turmoil that had been engulfing the country known as La Violencia and his left-leaning tendencies and relations made him a target of the newly elected conservative Government. He was released on December 6; shortly after, he presented his letters of resignation to the Ministry, and steps down as Director of Cultural Promotion and Fine Arts and as Professor at the National University on March and May 1950 respectively.

Feeling betrayed and persecuted by the government, he chooses to best serve the nation as a check on the government, this time as a tax auditor for the independent government agency of the Office of the Comptroller General of Colombia on June 1, 1950, until February 25, 1957. He would return to work at the Office of the Comptroller for a short time in 1959 from January 20 to May 25.

== Diplomat ==
By 1959, de Greiff had grown in popularity and international recognition and had the opportunity to return to the land of his ancestors for the first time when he was invited to the Congress of Nations for Disarmament and International Cooperation held by the World Peace Council from the 16th to the 22nd of July in 1958 in Stockholm. De Greiff who had not been an open communist was nevertheless of leftist tendencies and fit right in with the crowd, and after the summit he traveled to, at the invitation of the respective governments, the Soviet Union, the People’s Republic of China, East Germany, Austria, the SFR Yugoslavia, and France. The trip lasted a total of 115 days and it would mark him politically and personally as a friend and ally of the communists.

In 1958, upon his return to Colombia and after pressure from Juan Lozano y Lozano, President Alberto Lleras Camargo appointed de Greiff as First Secretary to the Colombian Embassy in Sweden, a post he held from June 16, 1959, to September 30, 1963. Lozano y Lozano had originally proposed de Greiff assume the post of Colombian Ambassador to Sweden, but President Lleras Camargo resisted this, considering him to be too “bohemian” to represent the nation in that post. This bohemian and independent quality put him at odds with the appointed ambassador while de Greiff was serving as secretary, especially for his indiscretions regarding a relationship he had with the Chinese Embassy, which he frequented on various occasions at their invitation. This was a breach of protocol as Bogotá did not maintain diplomatic relations with Beijing at that time. After the ambassador left his post, de Greiff became the Chargés d’affaires ad interim.

While in Sweden, de Greiff gained fame and popularity and even maintained a friendship with His Majesty King Gustaf VI Adolf, who in 1964 awarded him the Order of the Polar Star in the grade of Knight.

In 1975 in recognition of his diplomatic work de Greiff was awarded the Order of San Carlos in the grade of Grand Officer by the Government of Colombia.

== Later life and death ==
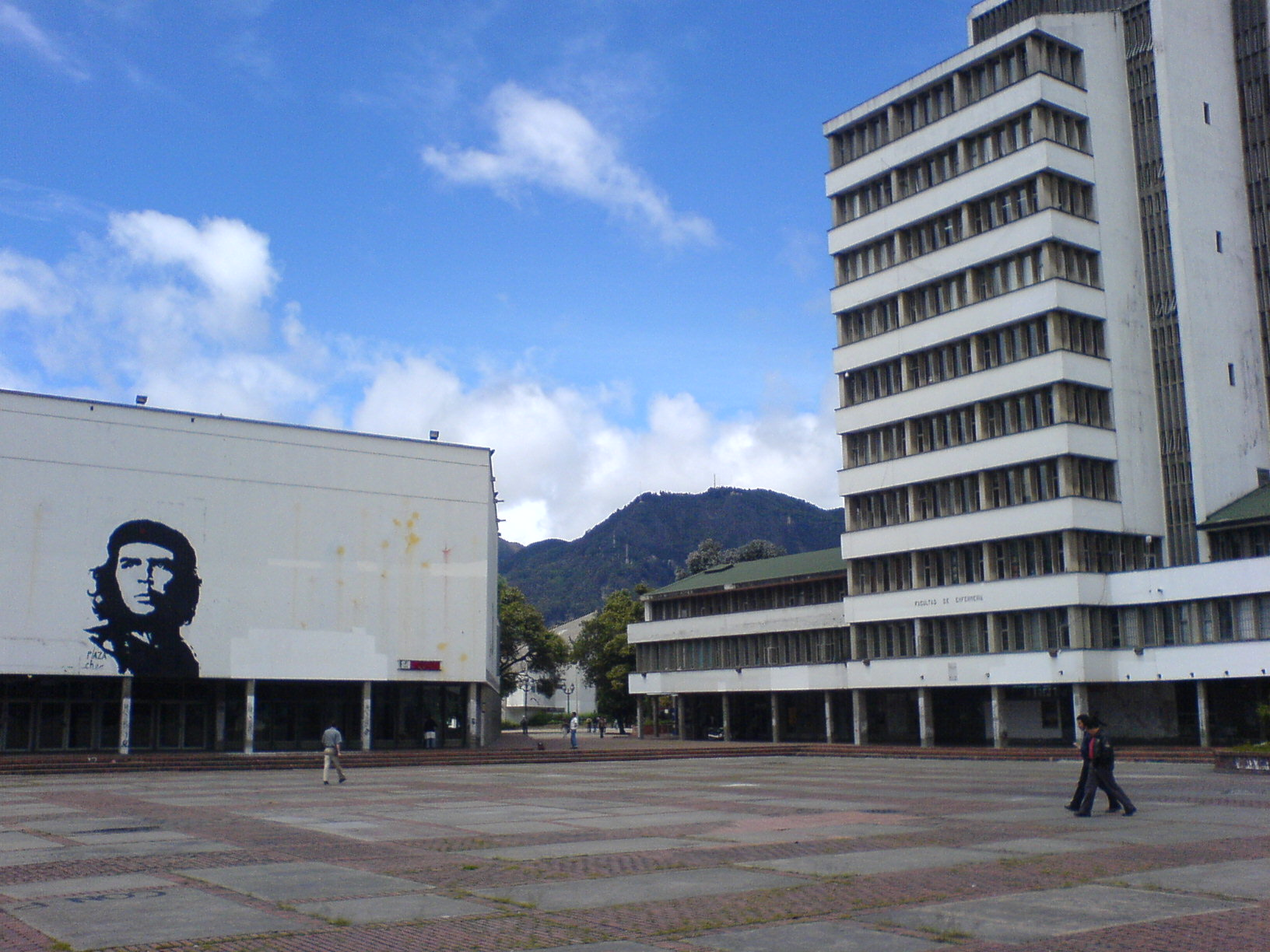
The León de Greiff Auditorium (left building) is considered a National Monument and is home to the Bogota Philharmonic

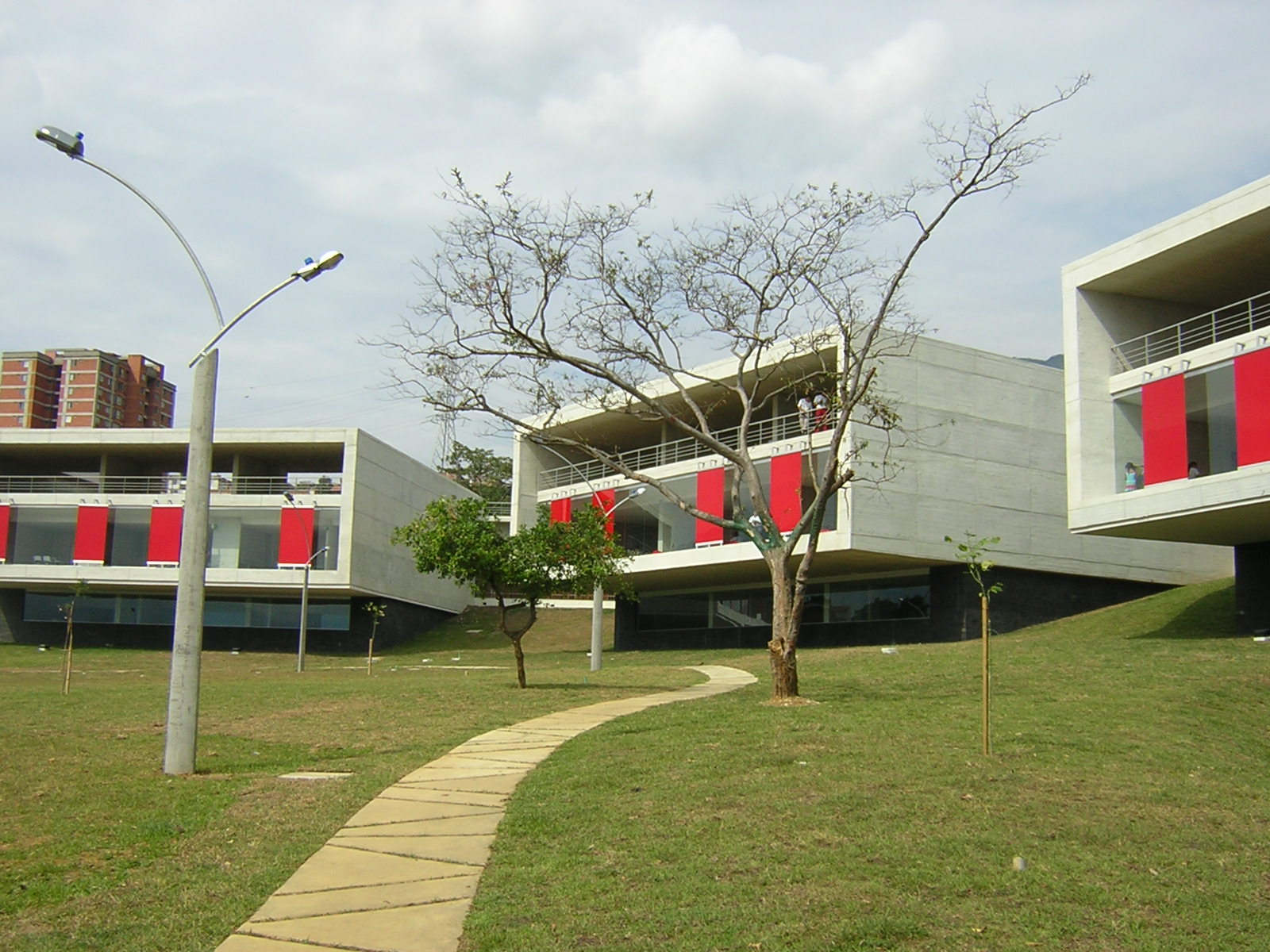
The León de Greiff Library and park designed by Giancarlo Mazzanti

León de Greiff retired on October 1, 1963, and at that time he started to enjoy his modest pension after 34 years as a civil servant. No longer at the service of the government, de Greiff took an active interest in promoting literature and education in and out of the country.

In 1965 de Greiff was awarded the Order of Boyaca with the rank of Commander, one of Colombia's highest honours. In 1974 he was made member correspondiente of the Academia Colombiana de la Lengua, and in 1974 honorary member of the Ministry of Culture’s Instituto Caro Y Cuervo. He also received various tributes including one from the Colombo-Argentinian Cultural Institute in 1955, (Instituto Cultural Colombo-Argentino), one from the National College of Journalists in 1961 (Colegio Nacional de Periodistas) presented by Gabriel García Márquez, an honoris causa doctorate in literature from the University of Valle on July 16, 1975, and in that same year another tribute from the National Association of Financial Institutions (Asociación Nacional de Instituciones Financieras, ANIF), presented to him by its then president Belisario Betancur. De Greiff traveled abroad, keeping with his cultural ambitions, and was part of the over 180 guest writers from 52 nations for the International Writer's Meeting organized by a West German writer's committee headed by Anna Seghers and Arnold Zweig in Berlin and Weimar. He also took part in the 1968 Cultural Congress of La Havana, where he was a judge in the Poetry Prize competition, as well as the 1970 Iberoamerican Community of Writers summit in Caracas, the Second Latin American Conference on Cultural Development and University Expansion in Mexico in 1972, and was part of the jury for the Quimantú (El Sol del Saber) Prize of Chile.

In Venezuela, architect Carlos Celis Cepero created the León de Greiff Hispanic-American Prize of Poetry (Premio Hispanoamericano de Poesía León de Greiff) which was first awarded on May 5, 1956, to the Venezuelan poet Juan Manuel González.

Upon his return to private life in Colombia, he remained involved with international political work. In 1967 he was elected President of the Colombo-Czechoslovak Friendship Association, and in 1971 elected President of the Colombo-Cuban Friendship Association (his son Axel would follow his father's steps by being elected President of the Swedish–Cuban Association), and was even invited to the inauguration of Mexican President Luis Echeverría Álvarez in 1970, and in 1972 was invited to Costa Rica by its President José Figueres Ferrer.

León de Greiff died at the age 80 in the early hours of Sunday July 11, 1976, in his home in Bogotá. Shortly after his death, the National University renamed its Central Auditorium in his honor. It is now a National Monument and home of the Bogota Philharmonic. In 2007 when a new public library-park was built, the city choose to name the León de Grieff Library in his honor and to promote culture and education in the city.

=== Other works ===
- Jesús Antonio, Uribe Prada, ed. (1925). Tergiversaciones de Leo Legris-Matias Aldecoa y Gaspar (Primer mamotreto) [Distortions of Leo Legris-Matias Aldecoa and Gaspas (First Mamotreto)]. Bogotá: Augusta. OCLC 12341312.
- Libro de signos, precedido de Los pingüinos peripatéticos; seguido de Fantasías de nubes al viento (Segundo Mamotreto) [Book of Signs, preceded by peripatetic Penguins, followed by fantasies of clouds to the wind (Second Mamotreto)]. Medellín: Imprenta editorial Antonio J. Cano. 1930. OCLC 1127472.
- Variaciones alrededor de nada (Tercer Mamotreto) [Variations around nothing (Third Mamotreto)]. Manizales: Tall. Gráf. Arturo Zapata. 1936-12-08. OCLC 55332315.
- Prosas de Gaspar : Primera suite (Cuarto Mamoterto) [Gaspar's Prose : First suite (Fourth Mamotreto)]. Bogotá: Imprenta nacional. 1937. OCLC 4773169.
- Lisman Baum, Samuel, ed. (September 1954). Fárrago (Quinto Mamotreto) [Farrago (Fifth Mamotreto)]. Bogotá: Ediciones S.L.B. OCLC 6819942.
- Bárbara Charanga - Bajo el signo de Leo. Primer Lote (Sexto Mamotreto) [Bárbara Charanga - Under the sign of Leo. First Lot (Sixth Mamotrero)]. Bogotá: Procultura. 1957.
- Velero paradójico (Septimo Mamotreto) [Paradoxical sailboat (Seventh Mamotreto)]. Bogotá: Universidad Nacional de Colombia, Unibiblos. 1957.
- Nova et vetera (Octavo Mamotreto) [New and Old (Eight Mamotreto)]. Caballito de mar. Bogotá: Tercer Mundo. December 1973. OCLC 41105706.
- Greiff, León de (1929). Cuadernillo poético. Esquico Nº 2, Suite en do mayor [Poetic booklet. Esquico No. 2, Suite in C major]. OCLC 15369452.
- Libro de relatos [Book of stories]. Illustrated by Juan Antonio Roda. Carlos Valencia Editores. 1979. ISBN 978-84-8277-012-3. OCLC 17048484.

== See also ==
- Jorge Isaacs
- José Eustasio Rivera
