= Pan American Junior Chess Championship =

Chess championship for players under 20 years old in the Americas

The Pan American Junior Chess Championship is an annual chess tournament open to players in the Americas who are under 20 years of age. The tournament has been held since 1974 with occasional interruptions. Beginning in 1995, a separate championship for girls has been held concurrently with the open championship.

The reigning champion is Annie Wang, who was the first girl to win any of the gender-unrestricted continental under-20 championships.

== Competition ==
The championships are organized by national federations affiliated with the Confederation of Chess for America (CCA). They are open to chess players who are under 20 years of age as of 1 January of the year in which the championship is held. The tournament format has varied over the years depending on the number of participants; since 2004, the open championship has been a nine-round Swiss-system tournament.

The winners of the open and girls' championships earn the right to participate in the next year's World Junior Chess Championships. In the open championship, the top three players after tiebreaks all earn the International Master title, while the first-placed player additionally earns a norm towards the Grandmaster title. In the girls' championship, the top three players after tiebreaks all earn the Woman International Master title, while the first-placed player additionally earns a norm towards the Woman Grandmaster title.

== Results ==
=== Open championship ===
Year	Venue	Winner	Players
1974	San Juan, Puerto Rico	Gildardo García (COL)	16
1975	Buenos Aires, Argentina	Jaime Sunye Neto (BRA)	10
1977	São Paulo, Brazil	Miguel Bernat (ARG)	12
1978	Belo Horizonte, Brazil	Javier Campos Moreno (CHI)	7
1979	Mercedes, Argentina	Iván Morovic (CHI)	9
1980	Córdoba, Argentina	Marcelo Tempone (ARG)	9
1981	San Pedro de Jujuy, Argentina	Rodolfo Garbarino (ARG)	13
1982	Buenos Aires, Argentina	Sandro Heleno Trindade (BRA)	12
1984	Lima, Peru	Julio Granda (PER)	16
1985	Saladillo, Argentina	Carlos Boissonet (ARG)	14
1986	Quito, Ecuador	Walter Arencibia (CUB)	16
1987	Asunción, Paraguay	Roberto Martín del Campo (MEX)	19
1988	Oaxaca, Mexico	Pedro Paneque Martín (CUB)	14
1989	Asunción, Paraguay	Andrés Rodríguez Vila (URU)	14
1990	Merlo, Argentina	Gustavo Hernández (DOM)	18
1991	Bariloche, Argentina	Roberto Watanabe (BRA)	15
1992	?	?	N/A
1993	Rancagua, Chile	Giovanni Vescovi (BRA)	14
1994	Santiago, Chile	Maximiliano Ginzburg (ARG)	18
1995	Santiago, Chile	Rafael Leitão (BRA)	22
1996	Trujillo, Peru	Diego Pereyra (ARG)	30
1997	Buenos Aires, Argentina	Fernando Peralta (ARG)	28
1998	Margarita Island, Venezuela	Giovanni Vescovi (BRA)	34
1999	Santiago, Chile	Martin Labollita (ARG)	25
2000	Macas, Ecuador	Rubén Felgaer (ARG)	23
2001	Yucay, Peru	Rubén Felgaer (ARG)	21
2002	La Paz, Bolivia	Rafael Prasca Sosa (VEN)	19
2003	Botucatu, Brazil	Dmitry Schneider (USA)	16
2004	Guayaquil, Ecuador	Pablo Lafuente (ARG)	15
2005	Cali, Colombia	Leandro Perdomo (ARG)	55
2006	Bogotá, Colombia	Eduardo Iturrizaga (VEN)	30
2007	Riobamba, Ecuador	Robert Hungaski (USA)	25
2008	Cali, Colombia	Damian Lemos (ARG)	46
2009	Montevideo, Uruguay	Ray Robson (USA)	34
2010	Cali, Colombia	Camilo Ríos Cristhian (COL)	33
2011	Durán, Ecuador	Leandro Krysa (ARG)	42
2012	São Paulo, Brazil	Jose Daniel Gemy (BOL)	54
2013	Bogotá, Colombia	Cristhian Barros Rivadeneira (ECU)	39
2014	Asunción, Paraguay	Cristobal Henriquez Villagra (CHI)	23
2015	San Salvador, El Salvador	Kevin Cori Quispe (PER)	46
2016	Guatapé, Colombia	Luis Paulo Supi (BRA)	56
2017	San Salvador, El Salvador	Brian Escalante Ramírez (PER)	26
2018	Guayaquil, Ecuador	Sanjay Ghatti (USA)	41
2019	Cochabamba, Bolivia	Annie Wang (USA)	51

=== Girls' championship ===
Year	Venue	Winner	Players
1995	Santiago, Chile	Martha Fierro (ECU)	15
1996	Trujillo, Peru	Martha Fierro (ECU)	21
1997	Buenos Aires, Argentina	Martha Fierro (ECU)	20
1998	Margarita Island, Venezuela	Saraí Sánchez Castillo (VEN)	20
1999	Santiago, Chile	Karen Zapata Campos (PER)	15
2000	Macas, Ecuador	Saraí Sánchez Castillo (VEN)	12
2001	Yucay, Peru	Saraí Sánchez Castillo (VEN)	17
2002	La Paz, Bolivia	Cindy Tsai (USA)	10
2003	Botucatu, Brazil	Luciana Morales Mendoza (PER)	6
2004	Guayaquil, Ecuador	Cindy Tsai (USA)	7
2005	Cali, Colombia	Jenny Astrid Chiriví Castiblanco (COL)	23
2006	Bogotá, Colombia	Ingrid Rivera Banquez (VEN)	13
2007	Riobamba, Ecuador	Jenny Astrid Chiriví Castiblanco (COL)	15
2008	Cali, Colombia	Deysi Cori (PER)	17
2009	Montevideo, Uruguay	Stephanie Amed (ARG)	11
2010	Cali, Colombia	Aura Cristina Salazar (COL)	25
2011	Durán, Ecuador	Paula Andrea Rodriguez Rueda (COL)	27
2012	São Paulo, Brazil	Paula Andrea Rodriguez Rueda (COL)	23
2013	Bogotá, Colombia	Paula Andrea Rodriguez Rueda (COL)	26
2014	Asunción, Paraguay	Ann Chumpitaz Carbajal (PER)	16
2015	San Salvador, El Salvador	Ashritha Eswaran (USA)	24
2016	Guatapé, Colombia	Lilia Ivonne Fuentes Godoy (MEX)	23
2017	San Salvador, El Salvador	Javiera Belén Gómez Barrera (CHI)	29
2018	Guayaquil, Ecuador	Thalia Cervantes Landeiro (USA)	28
2019	Cochabamba, Bolivia	Danitza Vázquez (PRI)	28

== See also ==
- African Junior Chess Championship
- Asian Junior Chess Championship
- European Junior Chess Championship
- European Youth Chess Championship
- North American Youth Chess Championship
