= Chess at the 1938 Bolivarian Games =

The chess competition for the 1938 Bolivarian Games took place in Bogotá from 10 to 20 August 1938. Six men competed in a double round-robin tournament held at Del Rosario University.

The revelation of the tournament was 21 year-old gold medalist Luis Augusto Sánchez, who conceded a single draw to Miguel Cuéllar and won all his other games, including both against the reigning Colombian champion Alfonso Herrera. Herrera and Cuéllar won the silver and bronze medals respectively. Bolivia sent two players including Jorge Rodríguez Hurtado, its national champion and president of the Bolivian Olympic Committee, and Venezuela was represented by its national champion Sady Loynaz.

== Medalists ==
Event	Gold	Silver	Bronze
Men's individual	Colombia; Luis Augusto Sánchez	Colombia; Alfonso Herrera	Colombia; Miguel Cuéllar

== Final standings and crosstable ==
I Bolivarian Games, 10–20 August 1938, Bogotá, Colombia
Rank	Player	1	2	3	4	5	6	Total
1st place, gold medalist(s)	Luis Augusto Sánchez (COL)		1 1	1 ½	1 1	1 1	1 1	9½
2nd place, silver medalist(s)	Alfonso Herrera (COL)	0 0		1 0	1 1	1 1	1 1	7
3rd place, bronze medalist(s)	Miguel Cuéllar (COL)	0 ½	0 1		1 0	1 1	1 ½	6
4	Sady Loynaz (VEN)	0 0	0 0	0 1		1 1	1 1	5
5	Hugo Córdoba Nieto (BOL)	0 0	0 0	0 0	0 0		½ 1	1½
6	Jorge Rodríguez Hurtado (BOL)	0 0	0 0	0 ½	0 0	½ 0		1
