= Luis Augusto Sánchez =

Colombian chess player (1917–1981)

Luis Augusto Sánchez (20 July 1917 – 1981) was a Colombian chess master.

He won the Colombian Chess Championship six times (1938, 1947, 1948, 1954, 1958, and 1962).

He broke out on the international stage in 1938 by winning the chess tournament at the first Bolivarian Games in Bogotá. In 1951, he won in Caracas (zonal). In 1952, he took 17th in Stockholm (interzonal; Alexander Kotov won). In 1957, he took 3rd in Caracas (zonal; Boris de Greiff won). In 1958, he took 8th in Bogotá (1st Torneo de las Americas; Oscar Panno won). In 1959, he tied for 4-6th with Raúl Sanguineti and Bobby Fischer in Santiago de Chile. The event was won by Borislav Ivkov and Luděk Pachman. In 1969, he tied for 4-5th in Quito (zonal; Eleazar Jiménez and Olavo Yépez won).

Sánchez played for Colombia in four Chess Olympiads.

- In 1954, at third board in the 11th Chess Olympiad in Amsterdam (+5 –4 =9);
- In 1956, at second board in the 12th Chess Olympiad in Moscow (+7 –2 =10);
- In 1958, at second board in the 13th Chess Olympiad in Munich (+4 –5 =10);
- In 1966, at first reserve board in the 17th Chess Olympiad in Havana (+7 –3 =5).

He was awarded the International Master title in 1951.
