= Przewoźnik =

Przewoźnik is a surname. Notable people with the surname include:

- Andrzej Przewoźnik (1963–2010), Polish historian
- Jan Przewoźnik (born 1957), Polish chess player
