= Adriana Salazar Varón =

Colombian chess player (born 1963)

Personal information
- Born: 27 December 1963 (age 62)

Chess career
- Country: Colombia
- Title: Woman International Master (1990)
- FIDE rating: 2100 (July 1997)
- Peak rating: 2135 (July 1990)

Adriana Salazar Varón (born 27 December 1963) is a Colombian chess player. She received the FIDE title of Woman International Master (WIM) in 1990 and is a nine-time winner of the Colombian Women's Chess Championship (1981, 1983, 1985, 1986, 1988, 1992, 1993, 1994, 1996).

== Biography ==
From the 1980s to the 1990s, Salazar was one of the leading Colombian female chess players. She won the Colombian Chess Championship for women nine times: in 1981, 1983, 1985, 1986, 1988, 1992, 1993, 1994 and 1996. In 1990, Salazar participated in Women's World Chess Championship Interzonal Tournament in Azov where she ranked 17th.

Salazar played for Colombia in the Women's Chess Olympiads:

- In 1982, at second board in the 10th Chess Olympiad (women) in Lucerne (+3, =4, -5),
- In 1984, at first board in the 26th Chess Olympiad (women) in Thessaloniki (+8, =0, -6),
- In 1986, at first board in the 27th Chess Olympiad (women) in Dubai (+8, =0, -6),
- In 1988, at first board in the 28th Chess Olympiad (women) in Thessaloniki (+5, =4, -5),
- In 1994, at first board in the 31st Chess Olympiad (women) in Moscow (+7, =4, -3),
- In 1996, at second board in the 32nd Chess Olympiad (women) in Yerevan (+3, =5, -4).

In 1990, she was awarded the FIDE Woman International Master (WIM) title.
