= Joshua Ruiz =

Colombian chess grandmaster (born 1997)

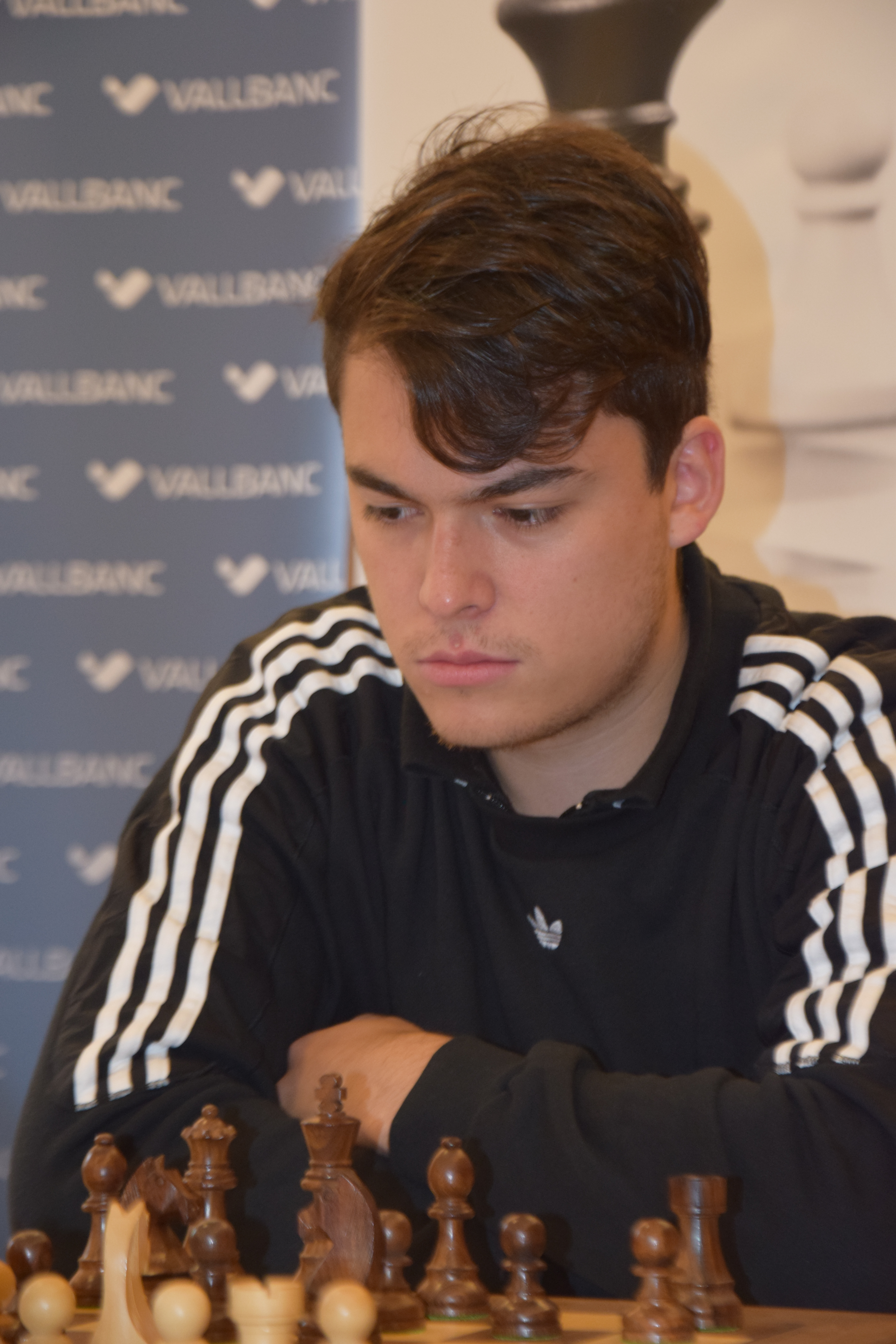
- Ruiz at the 2019 Andorra open

Personal information
- Born: Joshua Daniel Ruiz Castillo; July 8, 1997 (age 29) Bogotá, Colombia

Chess career
- Country: Colombia
- Title: Grandmaster (2019)
- FIDE rating: 2481 (July 2026)
- Peak rating: 2510 (February 2020)

Joshua Daniel Ruiz Castillo (born 1997) is a Colombian chess player. He was awarded the title of Grandmaster by FIDE in 2019.

== Chess career ==
Ruiz Castillo won the Colombian Chess Championship in 2014, becoming the youngest Colombian champion ever.

In 2017, he competed in the FIDE World Cup, and was defeated in the first round by Wesley So. In 2019, Ruiz Castillo earned the Grandmaster (GM) title after his Elo rating exceeded 2500 during the Master Open Alekhine Memorial tournament in Russia. He achieved the norms required for the title at the Central American and Caribbean Junior Championships of 2012 and 2013, at each of which he took the gold medal, and at the L.A.B. GM norm tournament in Bogotá 2012.
