= Bjørn Tiller =

Norwegian chess player

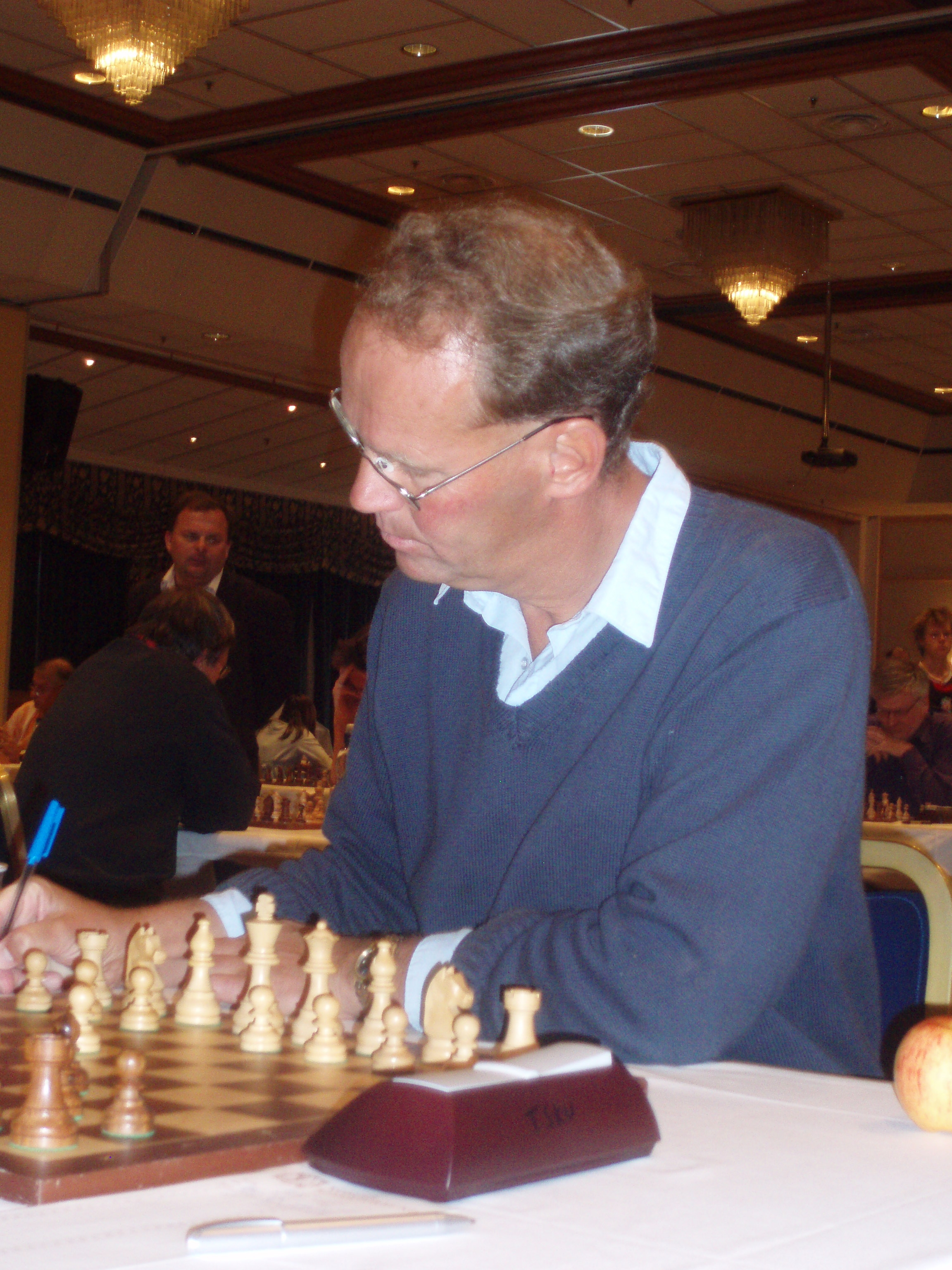
- Bjørn Tiller in 2008

Personal information
- Born: 16 January 1959 (age 67)

Chess career
- Country: Norway
- Title: International Master (1982)
- Peak rating: 2435 (January 1983)

Bjørn Tiller (born 16 January 1959) is a Norwegian chess International Master (IM) (1982), Norwegian Chess Championship winner (1983), Chess Olympiad individual gold medal winner (1980).

== Biography ==
In 1974, Bjørn Tiller won Norwegian Junior Chess Championship. In 1982, in Lillehammer he shared first place with Simen Agdestein in Norwegian Chess Championship but lost additional match for champions title. In 1983, in Trondheim Bjørn Tiller won Norwegian Chess Championship.

Bjørn Tiller played for Norway in the Chess Olympiads:

- In 1976, at second reserve board in the 22nd Chess Olympiad in Haifa (+1, =4, -2),
- In 1980, at first reserve board in the 24th Chess Olympiad in La Valletta (+4, =4, -0) and won individual gold medal.

Bjørn Tiller played for Norway in the World Youth U26 Team Chess Championship:

- In 1981, at first board in the 3rd World Youth U26 Team Chess Championship in Graz (+3, =3, -4).

In 1982, Bjørn Tiller was awarded the FIDE International Master (IM) title. He played for Oslo chess club Schakselskap. Since 2011, Bjørn Tiller has rarely participated in chess tournaments.
