= Miguel Bernat =

Argentine chess player (born 1957)

Personal information
- Born: 18 September 1957 (age 68) Buenos Aires, Argentina

Chess career
- Country: Argentina
- Title: International Master (1978)
- Peak rating: 2410 (January 1977)

Miguel Ignacio Bernat (born 18 September 1957), is an Argentine chess International Master (IM) (1978), Pan American Junior Chess Championship winner (1977).

== Biography ==
In the end of 1970s Miguel Bernat was one of Argentina's leading junior chess players. In 1976, Miguel Bernat participated in the Argentine Chess Championship final and shared 7th-10th place. In 1977, in Innsbruck he participated in World Junior Chess Championship. In the same year Miguel Bernat won Pan American Junior Chess Championship.

Miguel Bernat played for Argentina B team in the Chess Olympiad:

- In 1978, at first reserve board in the 23rd Chess Olympiad in Buenos Aires (+3, =2, -1).

Miguel Bernat played for Argentina in the World Youth U26 Team Chess Championship:

- In 1980, at second board in the 2nd World Youth U26 Team Chess Championship in Mexico City (+3, =3, -3) and won team bronze medal,
- In 1983, at second board in the 4th World Youth U26 Team Chess Championship in Chicago (+2, =4, -2).
