= Bill Hook (chess player) =

American chess player (1925–2010)

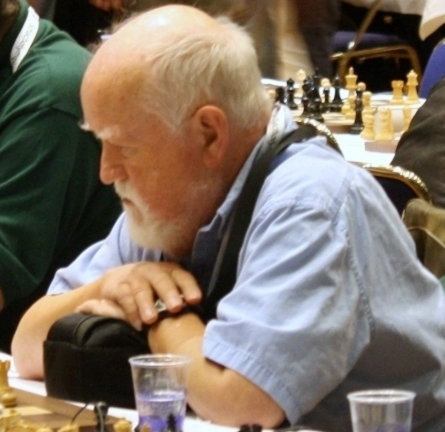
- Hook at the Dresden Olympiad, 2008

Personal information
- Born: May 28, 1925 New Rochelle, New York
- Died: May 10, 2010 (aged 84) Silver Spring, Maryland

Chess career
- Country: British Virgin Islands
- Peak rating: 2275 (January 1981)

William E. Hook (May 28, 1925 – May 10, 2010), born in New Rochelle, New York, was an American Chess master and the Captain of the British Virgin Islands chess team.

Starting in 1968, Hook led the Virgin Islands team, and later the British Virgin Islands team, at numerous Chess Olympiads, mostly playing top board (the last one - he was playing at the age of 83!). At the Malta Olympiad of 1980, Hook won the gold medal on board 1 for best percentage result of any national team member. He defeated a grandmaster and several national champions along the way. To commemorate this achievement the British Virgin Islands issued multiple stamps in his honor.

During the preliminary rounds of the 1970 Siegen Olympiad, the Virgin Islands were paired with the USA team and Hook faced the legendary Bobby Fischer. Playing the black pieces, Hook ventured a pet line of the French Defence whereupon an exciting encounter developed, culminating in a stylish rook sacrifice by Fischer.

Hook authored a book as well as various magazine and newspaper articles about chess. In the art world, he is known for his one-man shows in painting and photography. He lived in Washington D.C., with his wife Mimi. He died on May 10, 2010 of congestive heart failure.

== Books ==
- Hooked on Chess by Bill Hook ISBN 90-5691-220-8
