= David Arenas =

Colombian chess grandmaster (born 1991)

Personal information
- Full name: David Arenas Vanegas
- Born: 29 December 1991 (age 34) Antioquia, Colombia

Chess career
- Country: Colombia
- Title: Grandmaster (2017)
- Peak rating: 2496 (December 2015)

David Arenas Vanegas (born 29 December 1991) is a Colombian chess grandmaster.

He won the Colombian Chess Championship in 2010 and 2015.

As part of the Colombian national chess team, he participated in the 2010 Chess Olympiad.

Arenas received his International Master (IM) title in 2005 and his Grandmaster (GM) title in 2017.
