= Cerro Tusa =

Mountain in Colombia

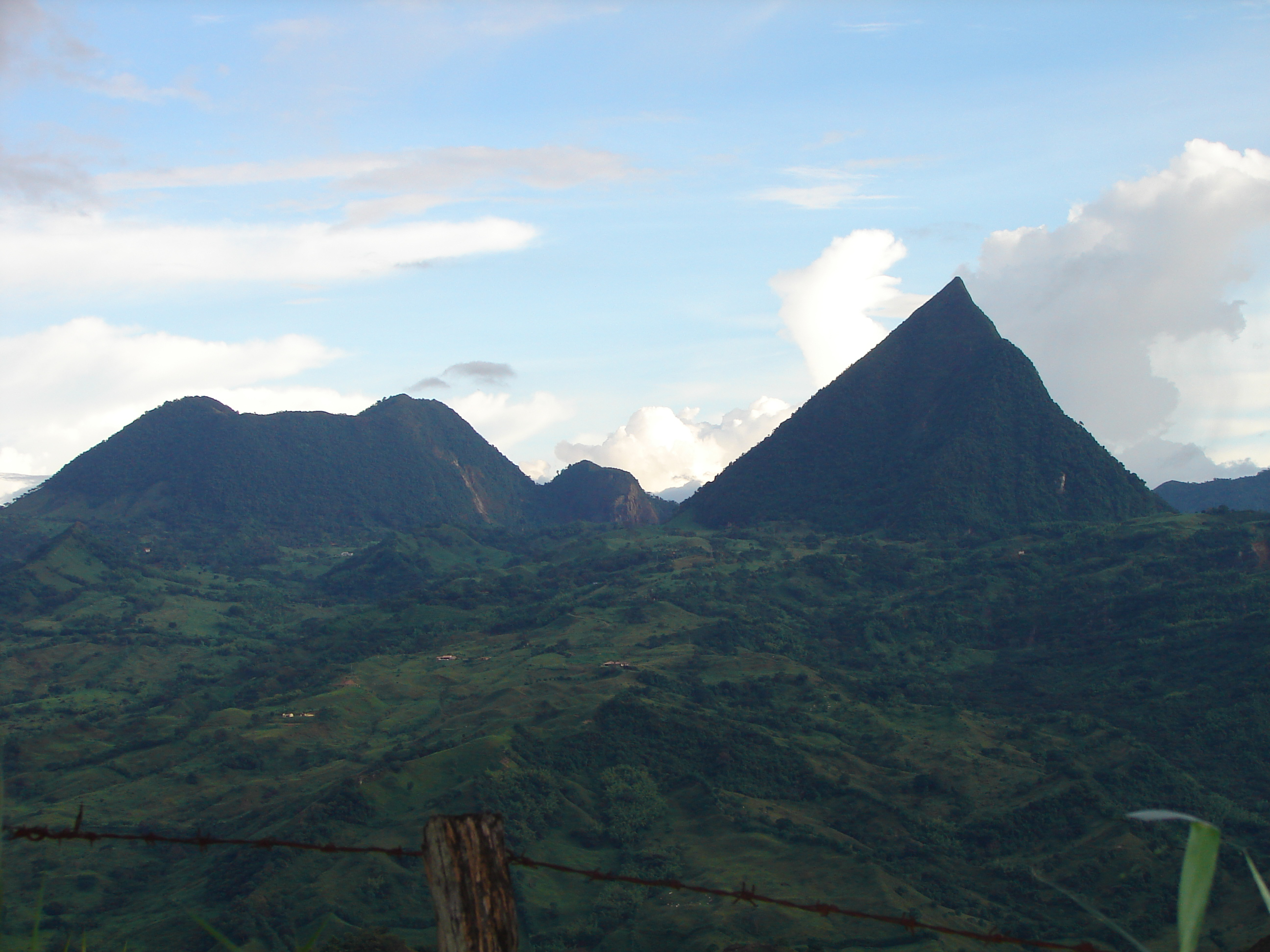

Highest point
- Coordinates: 5°57′51.48″N 75°46′13.58″W

Geography
- Location: Venecia, Antioquia
- Country: Colombia

Geology
- Mountain type: Volcanic

Cerro Tusa is a pyramid-shaped mountain in Venecia, Colombia. It is located in the southwest region of the Antioquia Department, 240 km northwest of the capital Bogotá. The summit of Cerro Tusa is 1,897 meters above sea level, or 457 meters above the surrounding terrain. The width at the base is 1.8 km. There is a sanctuary at the base of the mountain.

In the Pre-Columbian era, the area was inhabited by the Zenufaná people.
