= José Félix Villarreal =

Mexican chess player (1956–2022)

Personal information
- Born: 6 March 1956
- Died: 5 May 2022 (aged 66) Tijuana, Mexico

Chess career
- Country: Mexico
- Title: International Master (1980)
- Peak rating: 2435 (January 1981)

José Félix Villarreal (March 6, 1956 - May 5, 2022) was a Mexican chess International Master (IM) (1980), Chess Olympiad individual gold medal winner (1980).

== Biography ==
In 1974, José Félix Villarreal won Mexican Junior Chess Championship. In 1975, in Buenos Aires he won silver medal in Pan American Junior Chess Championship. He two times participated in World Junior Chess Championships (1973, 1975).

José Félix Villarreal played for Mexico in the Chess Olympiads:

- In 1978, at third board in the 23rd Chess Olympiad in Buenos Aires (+2, =1, -3),
- In 1980, at third board in the 24th Chess Olympiad in La Valletta (+7, =4, -0) and won individual gold medal,
- In 1982, at third board in the 25th Chess Olympiad in Lucerne (+5, =1, -6),
- In 1994, at first reserve board in the 31st Chess Olympiad in Moscow (+1, =1, -3),
- In 2000, at first reserve board in the 34th Chess Olympiad in Istanbul (+1, =2, -1).

José Félix Villarreal played for Mexico in the World Student Team Chess Championship:

- In 1977, at second board in the 22nd World Student Team Chess Championship in Mexico City (+1, =5, -5).

José Félix Villarreal played for Mexico in the World Youth U26 Team Chess Championship:

- In 1978, at second board in the 1st World Youth U26 Team Chess Championship in Mexico City (+3, =3, -4).

In 1980, José Félix Villarreal was awarded the FIDE International Master (IM) title. By profession he was construction engineer. Since 1983, José Félix Villarreal had been playing chess tournaments irregularly. He worked in the Mexican Chess Federation.

He died on May 5, 2022 from an infection acquired at the hospital where he was entered after surviving an attack on March 19 in Tijuana, where armed assailants entered the home of Patricia Susana Rivera, lawyer, human rights advocate and friend of José Félix Villarreal. Rivera was killed on the scene.
