= Miguel Cuéllar =

Colombian chess player (1916–1985)

Miguel Cuéllar Gacharná (18 November 1916 – 5 December 1985) was a Colombian chess master from Tinjacá.

Cuéllar won the Colombian championship nine times: in 1941, 1946, 1953, 1955, 1956, 1957, 1959, 1961, and 1971. He played for Colombia in six Chess Olympiads: 1954, 1956, 1958, 1964, 1970, and 1972. He won individual silver medal at first board (+12 –2 =4) in the 16th Olympiad at Tel Aviv 1964.

He won a bronze medal representing Colombia at the 1938 Bolivarian Games in Bogotá. In 1952, he tied for 3rd-4th in Mar del Plata (Julio Bolbochán and Héctor Rossetto won). In 1953, he took 5th in Mar del Plata (Svetozar Gligorić won). In 1957, he took 7th in Mar del Plata (Paul Keres won). In 1958, he tied for 2nd-3rd with William Lombardy, behind Oscar Panno, in Bogotá.

In 1961, Cuéllar won in Caracas (zonal). In 1962, he placed 22nd at the Stockholm Interzonal, defeating both Efim Geller and Viktor Korchnoi in individual games. In 1966, he took 7th in Havana (Eleazar Jiménez won). In 1967, he tied for 19-20th in Sousse (interzonal; Bent Larsen won). In 1969, he tied for 1st with Boris de Greiff in Bogotá. In 1970, he took 7th in Bogotá (Henrique Mecking won). In 1970, he took 14th in Caracas (Lubomir Kavalek won). In 1972, he won the Zonal tournament in Bogotá, and qualified for the 1973 Leningrad Interzonal, but finished there in last place (Anatoly Karpov and Viktor Korchnoi won). In 1980, he tied for 4-5th in Bogotá (Joaquin Gutierrez won).

He was awarded the International Master (IM) title in 1957.
