= Germán Arciniegas =

Colombian essayist and historian

- Germán Arciniegas (1930s)

Ambassador of Colombia for the Holy See in the Vatican
- In office 1976–1979
- Preceded by: José Joaquín Gori
- Succeeded by: Raimundo Emiliani Román

Secretary of Education of Colombia
- In office 9 September 1945 – 7 August 1946
- Preceded by: Antonio Rocha Alvira
- Succeeded by: Mario Carvajal Borrero
- In office 13 January 1942 – 7 August 1942
- Preceded by: Juan Lozano y Lozano
- Succeeded by: Jorge Zalamea Borda

Personal details
- Born: December 6, 1900 Bogotá, Colombia
- Died: November 29, 1999 (aged 98) Bogotá, Colombia
- Resting place: Central Cemetery of Bogotá
- Party: Colombian Liberal Party
- Spouse: Gabriela Vieira
- Relatives: Joaquín Arciniegas Tavera; Ricardo Armando Novoa Arciniegas
- Education: National University of Colombia
- Occupation: Writer, politician, ambassador and professor

Germán Arciniegas Angueyra (December 6, 1900 - November 29, 1999) was a Colombian historian, writer and journalist who was known for his advocacy of educational and cultural issues, as well as his outspoken opposition to dictatorship. He also served as a college professor and held positions in the government, including Minister of Education and several ambassadorships.

== Family ==
Arciniegas was the son of Rafael Arciniegas Tavera, a farmer, and his wife Aurora Angueyra Figueredo. He had three brothers and four sisters. His father died young, leaving his mother struggling to support the family, his sister Maria Mercedes and his younger brother Joaquín Arciniegas Tavera migrated to El Salvador. His maternal great-grandfather was Perucho Figueredo, an early Cuban freedom fighter who wrote La Bayamesa, Cuba's national anthem. Both of Perucho's daughters fled the country when he was executed. Luz, the younger daughter, was married to a Cuban engineer who went to Colombia to help build a railroad line. It was there, amid the dangers of the jungle, that Germán's mother was born.

== Early years ==
At the age of eighteen, he began studying law at the National University of Colombia. At that time he had already created two journals: Año Quinto (1916) and Voz de la Juventud (1917). While a student he founded and managed the magazine Universidad (1921). He collaborated with many well-known figures at all three periodicals, including Luis López de Mesa, José Vasconcelos, León de Greiff and José Juan Tablada, who introduced the haiku into Spanish literature via Universidad. His love of journalism led him to establish and manage numerous cultural magazines throughout his life. In 1928, he joined El Tiempo, a daily newspaper in Bogotá, where he managed the editorial section, put together the Sunday Literary Supplement and wrote a weekly column, becoming the general manager in 1937. He would continue to contribute articles and opinion pieces to El Tiempo for the rest of his life, speaking out against drug trafficking, Marxist guerrillas and restrictive immigration policies.

With the assistance of Carlos Pellicer, he established the Federation of Colombian Students. The group opposed Jesuit influence in the nation's universities and held student carnivals which verged on riots. He narrowly missed being killed when a bullet grazed his head at one student rally. Their activism eventually helped to end the Conservative Party's grip on the government and, in 1933, led to the passage of university reforms, which gave students the right to elect their own rectors and have a representative in the legislature to act as their advocate; a position Arciniegas held for a time. For him, students were the axis around which all political and intellectual movements had turned throughout history. This gave rise to his first book El Estudiante de la Mesa Redonda (The Student of the Round Table, 1932), in which he speaks of history as a "tavern" with the students sitting at a single table, drinking, recounting their deeds and laughing at everybody else.

== Later career ==
He continued his fight for students' rights during his brief tenures as Minister of Education in 1942 and 1945-46. During this time, he founded the Caro and Cuervo Institute and moved the Colombian National Museum to its current home in a former prison building.

During World War II, he supported giving aid and asylum to refugees. This was in opposition to Luis López de Mesa, the Minister of Foreign Affairs, who prohibited the entry of Jews into Colombia. Due to this resurgence of Conservative ideology in the 1940s, Arciniegas felt that he and his family were in danger and moved to the United States, taking advantage of an offer to teach at Columbia University. He lived in New York for ten years (1947–57). At this time, he wrote his most important and most often banned book, Entre la Libertad y el Miedo (Between Freedom and Fear, 1952). The work analyzes a critical period in Latin-America, when seven dictators were in power at the same time. He also criticized the U.S. State Department for its conciliatory behavior towards these regimes and, as a result, was detained for questioning several times after returning from trips abroad. The publication and translation of the book was prohibited in at least ten countries. General Gustavo Rojas Pinilla, the President of Colombia, accused Arciniegas of being a Communist and ordered all of his books to be burnt. Rafael Trujillo, the dictator of the Dominican Republic, put Arciniegas on his hit list.

In terms of culture, Arciniegas strove to achieve and maintain a synthesis between the indigenous and the European. This approach was the driving force behind all of his diplomatic and political activities. He served as vice consul in London (1929), chancellor at the Colombian embassy in Argentina (1940) and as Ambassador to Italy (1959), Israel (1962), Venezuela (1966) and the Holy See (1976). In all of these positions, he acted as an advocate for the art and culture of America, which he perceived as extending from Alaska to Patagonia. From 1960 to 1965 Arciniegas edited the Spanish language magazine of the Congress for Cultural Freedom, Cuadernos.

In 1992, he was appointed President of the National Commission for the Celebration of the Five-Hundredth Anniversary of the Discovery of America. He was summarily dismissed by then First-Lady Ana Milena Muñoz de Gaviria, who took over the commission herself; an action that generated much controversy.

== Honors and awards ==
- Order of Civil Merit Grand Cross of Spain (1982)
- Order of Merit of the Italian Republic (1962)
- Maria Moors Cabot Prize (1963)
- Alfonso Reyes International Prize (1994)
- Honorary member of the Academia Mexicana de la Lengua (1949).
- Doctor Honoris Causa at the Faculty of Humanities and Education of the Universidad Nacional Pedro Henríquez Ureña (UNPHU, 1984).

== Selected works ==
=== English ===
- The Knight of El Dorado: The Tale of Don Gonzalo Jiménez de Quesada and His Conquest of New Granada, translated by Mildred Adams, Viking Press (1942)
- Germans in the Conquest of America: A Sixteenth-Century Venture, translated by Ángel Flores, Macmillan (1943)
- The State of Latin-America: Twenty Nations Between Freedom and Fear, translated by Harriet de Onís, Knopf (1952)
- Latin-America: A Cultural History, translated by Joan MacLean, Knopf (1967)
- Amerigo and the New World : The Life & Times of Amerigo Vespucci, translated by Harriet de Onís, Octagon (1978) ISBN 0-374-90280-1
- America in Europe: A History of the New World in Reverse, translated by Gabriela Arciniegas and Victoria Arana, Harcourt (1986) ISBN 0-15-105555-6
- Caribbean: Sea of the New World, translated by Harriet de Onís, Markus Wiener (2003) ISBN 1-55876-312-0

=== Spanish ===
- El Estudiante de la Mesa Redonda, Ercilla (1937)
- Los Comuneros, Editorial ABC (1938)
- Este Pueblo de América, Fondo de Cultura Economica (1945)
- América Mágica. Los Hombres y los Meses, Sudamericana (1961)
- América Mágica. Las Mujeres y las Horas, Sudamericana (1961)
