= Rosalba Patiño =

Colombian chess player

Personal information
- Born: 1951 (age 74–75)

Chess career
- Country: Colombia

Rosalba Patiño (born 1951) is a Colombian chess player, who won the women's Colombian Chess Champion in 1977.

== Biography ==
From the beginning of the 1970s to the beginning of the 1980s, Rosalba Patiño was one of Colombia's leading female chess players. In 1977, in Bogotá she won the Colombian Women's Chess Championship. In 1978, in Cali Rosalba Patiño participated in Women's World Chess Championships Central American Zonal tournament and ranked 5th. In 1980, in Córdoba she shared 3rd-4th place in 1st Pan American Women's Chess Championship.

Rosalba Patiño played for Colombia in the Women's Chess Olympiads:

- In 1974, at second board in the 6th Chess Olympiad (women) in Medellín (+0, =3, -4),
- In 1976, at first reserve board in the 7th Chess Olympiad (women) in Haifa (+2, =3, -3),
- In 1978, at second board in the 8th Chess Olympiad (women) in Buenos Aires (+5, =4, -3),
- In 1980, at first reserve board in the 9th Chess Olympiad (women) in Valletta (+5, =2, -3).
