= Teresa Leyva =

Colombian chess player

Personal information
- Born: 1965 (age 60–61) Trieste, Italy

Chess career
- Country: Colombia
- Title: Woman FIDE master

Teresa Leyva (born 1965) is a Colombian chess player and two-time Colombian Women's Chess Champion.

== Biography ==
From the mid-1970s to the mid-1980s, she was one of the leading Colombian women's chess players. She won the Colombian Chess Championship for women in 1976 and 1982.

Teresa Leyva played for Colombia in the Women's Chess Olympiads:

- In 1976, at first board in the 7th Chess Olympiad (women) in Haifa (+1, =5, -2),
- In 1980, at second board in the 9th Chess Olympiad (women) in Valletta (+3, =3, -4),
- In 1982, at first reserve board in the 10th Chess Olympiad (women) in Lucerne (+5, =4, -0) and won individual gold medal.
