= Sergio Barrientos =

Colombian chess grandmaster (born 1986)

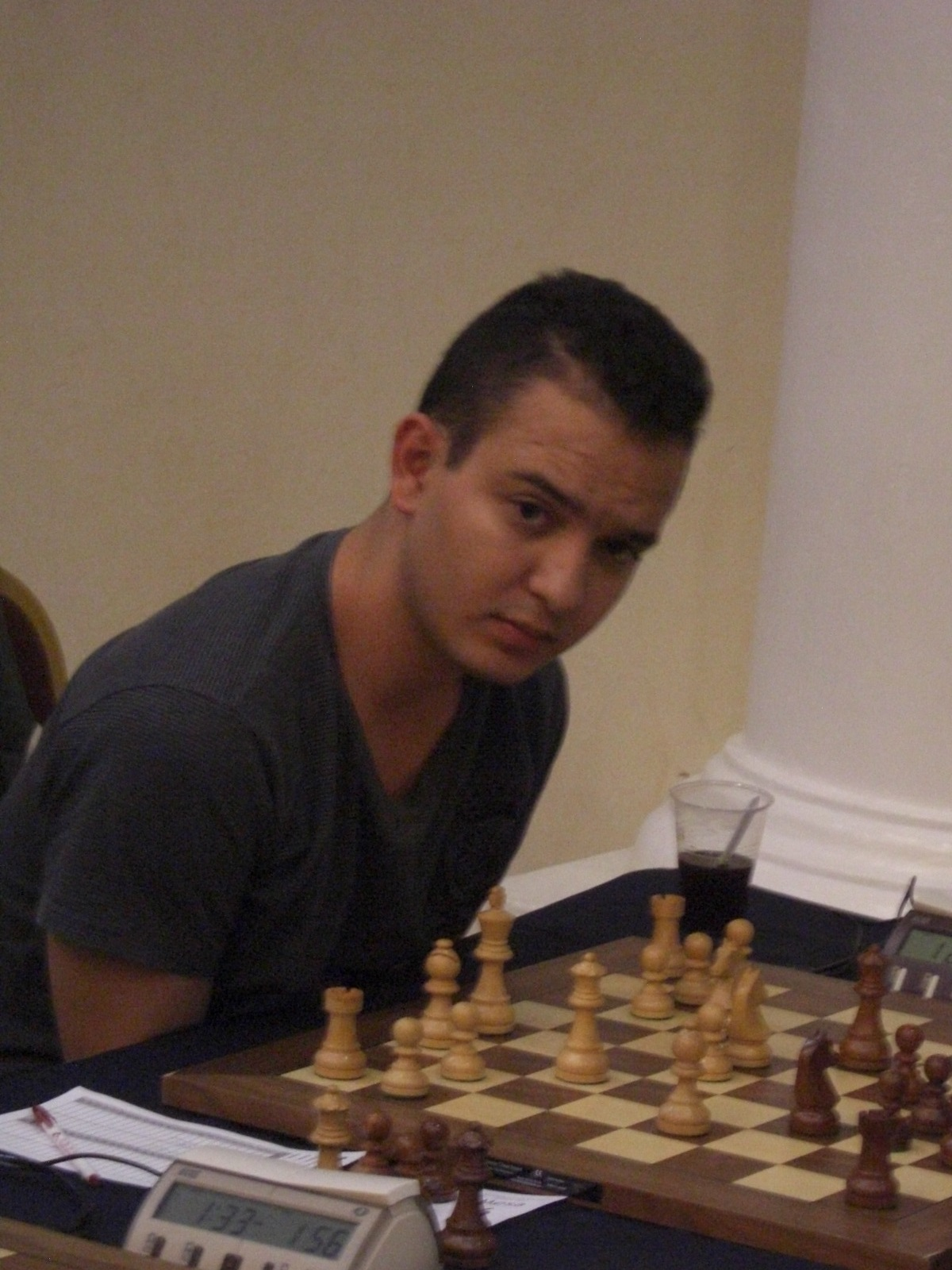

Personal information
- Born: June 29, 1986 (age 40) Medellín, Colombia

Chess career
- Country: Colombia
- Title: Grandmaster (2011)
- FIDE rating: 2467 (July 2026)
- Peak rating: 2519 (January 2012)

Sergio Esneider Barrientos Chavarriaga (born 29 June 1986) is a Colombian chess player. He was awarded the title of Grandmaster by FIDE in 2011.

== Career ==
He won the Colombian Chess Championship in 2020 and qualified for the 2021 Chess World Cup, where he was defeated by Ante Brkić in the first round.
