= Jacob Øst-Hansen =

Danish chess player (born 1952)

Personal information
- Born: 18 August 1952 (age 73)

Chess career
- Country: Denmark
- Title: FIDE Master (1981)
- Peak rating: 2430 (January 1984)

Jacob Øst-Hansen (born 18 August 1952), is a Danish chess FIDE Master (FM), Danish Chess Championship medalist (1976), Chess Olympiad individual medalist (1980), European Team Chess Championship individual medalist (1983).

== Biography ==
At Athens 1971, Øst-Hansen competed at the 11th World Junior Chess Championship, sharing 14th-15th place. From the mid-1970s to the mid-1980s, he was one of the leading Danish chess players. His best result in the Danish Chess Championship final was in 1976, when he shared 2nd-7th place.

Øst-Hansen often played for Denmark in international team competitions, including:

the European Chess Club Cup:

- In 1976, he competed for the Danish Vejlby-Risskov SK team at the first official European Chess Club Cup. The team reached the quarterfinals, losing to Burevestnik Moscow (USSR), one of the winners of the tournament.

the Chess Olympiads:

- In 1976, at second board in the 22nd Chess Olympiad in Haifa (+3, =7, -1),
- In 1980, at first reserve board in the 24th Chess Olympiad in La Valletta (+5, =6, -0) and won individual bronze medal,
- In 1982, at fourth board in the 25th Chess Olympiad in Lucerne (+5, =5, -2).

the European Team Chess Championships:

- In 1983, at sixth board in the 8th European Team Chess Championship in Plovdiv (+3, =3, -0) and won individual gold medal.

the World Student Team Chess Championships:

- In 1972, at fourth board in the 19th World Student Team Chess Championship in Graz (+4, =5, -1),
- In 1974, at fourth board in the 20th World Student Team Chess Championship in Teesside (+6, =3, -3).

and the Nordic Chess Cup:

- In 1976, at first board in the 7th Nordic Chess Cup in Bremen (+2, =2, -1) and won team bronze medal,
- In 1989, at third board in the 12th Nordic Chess Cup in Aabybro (+1, =6, -0) and won team gold medal.
