= Oscar Castro (chess player) =

Colombian chess player (1953–2015)

Personal information
- Born: 8 May 1953
- Died: 13 April 2015 (aged 61)

Chess career
- Country: Colombia
- Title: International Master (1975)
- Peak rating: 2430 (January 1979)

Óscar Humberto Castro Rojas (8 May 1953 – 13 April 2015) was a Colombian chess International Master (IM) (1975), who won the Colombian Chess Championships six times (1972–1974, 1992, 1994, 1999).

== Biography ==
From the early 1970s to the mid-1990s, Óscar Castro was one of the leading Colombian chess players. He won the Colombian Chess Championships 6 times: 1972–1974, 1992, 1994, 1999. In 1976 in Biel, Óscar Castro participated in the World Chess Championship Interzonal Tournament where he ranked 18th. In this tournament, he defeated such grandmasters as Tigran Petrosian and Efim Geller.

Óscar Castro participated in international tournaments many times and won 2nd place in Maresme (1976) and shared 2nd place in Linares International Chess Tournament (1979).

Óscar Castro played for Colombia in the Chess Olympiads:

- In 1974, at first board in the 21st Chess Olympiad in Nice (+4, =9, −5),
- In 1976, at second board in the 22nd Chess Olympiad in Haifa (+2, =4, −3),
- In 1980, at third board in the 24th Chess Olympiad in La Valletta (+2, =6, −2),
- In 1990, at third board in the 29th Chess Olympiad in Novi Sad (+7, =3, −3),
- In 1992, at fourth board in the 30th Chess Olympiad in Manila (+5, =5, −2),
- In 1994, at first board in the 31st Chess Olympiad in Moscow (+5, =2, −4).

Óscar Castro played for Colombia in the World Student Team Chess Championship:

- In 1972, at first board in the 19th World Student Team Chess Championship in Graz (+4, =6, −2).

Óscar Castro was awarded the International Master (IM) title in 1975.
