= Marisa Zuriel =

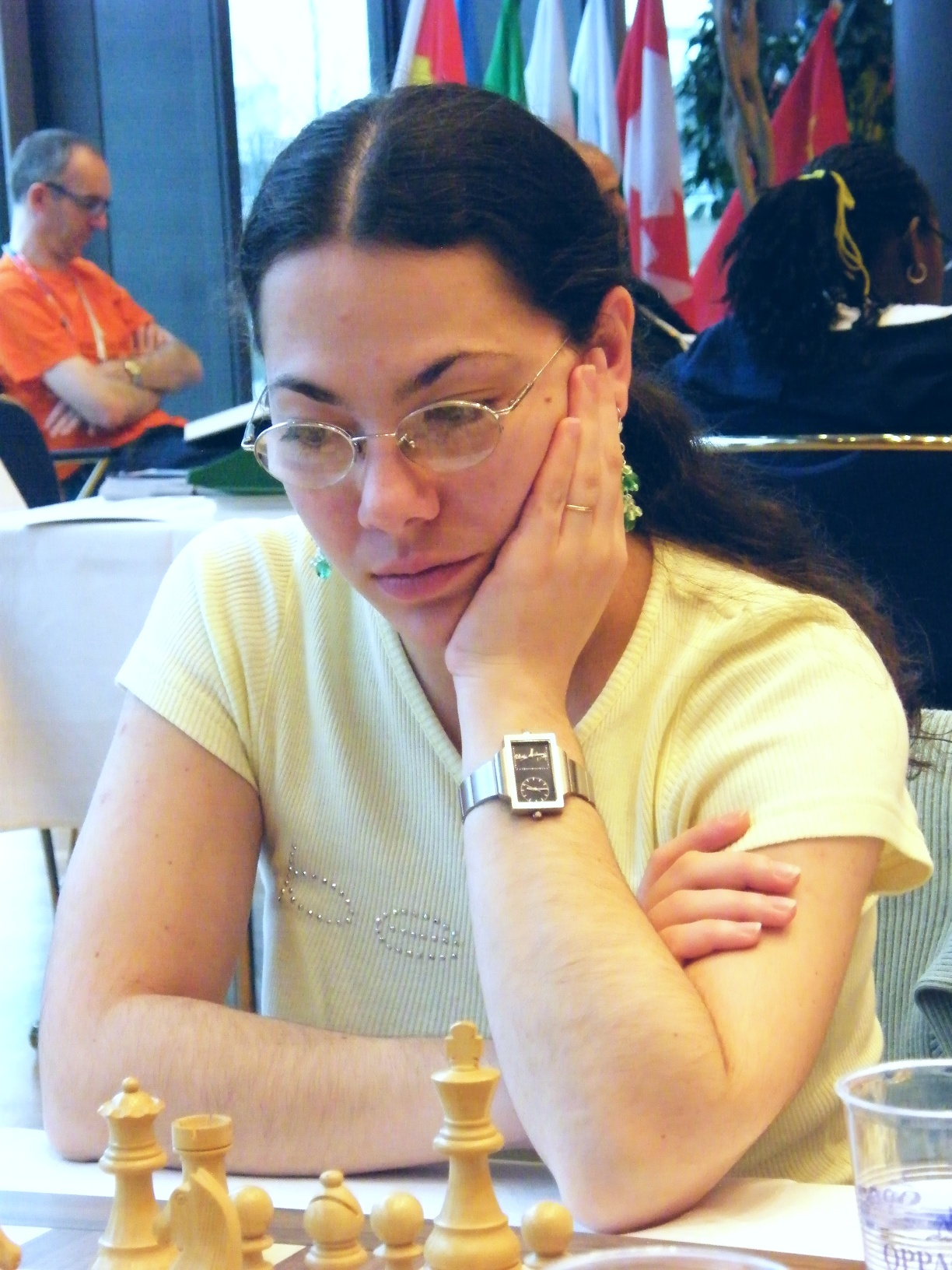
- Zuriel in 2008

Personal information
- Born: August 19, 1982 (age 43) Buenos Aires, Argentina

Chess career
- Country: Argentina
- Title: Woman International Master (2006)
- Peak rating: 2295 (February 2016)

Marisa Zuriel (born August 19, 1982, in Buenos Aires) is an Argentine chess player who holds the FIDE title of Woman International Master.

She won the Argentine women's chess championships of 2005 and 2012.

Zuriel won the 2007 American Continental Women's Chess Championship in Potrero de los Funes, San Luis Province after a playoff match, which ended with an armageddon game, with Sarai Sanchez Castillo.

She played in the Women's World Chess Championship in 2008, 2010 and 2015.
