= Hugo Córdova =

Bolivian chess player

Personal information
- Full name: Hugo Córdova Nieto
- Born: unknown
- Died: unknown

Chess career
- Country: Bolivia

Hugo Córdova or Córdoba was a Bolivian chess player.

== Biography ==
In the 1930s Hugo Córdova was one of Bolivia's leading chess players. He represented Bolivia at the 1938 Bolivarian Games.

Hugo Córdova played on first board for Bolivia in the 8th Chess Olympiad in Buenos Aires in 1939, scoring two wins, one draw, and thirteen losses.
