= Carlos Cuartas =

Colombian chess player (1940–2011)

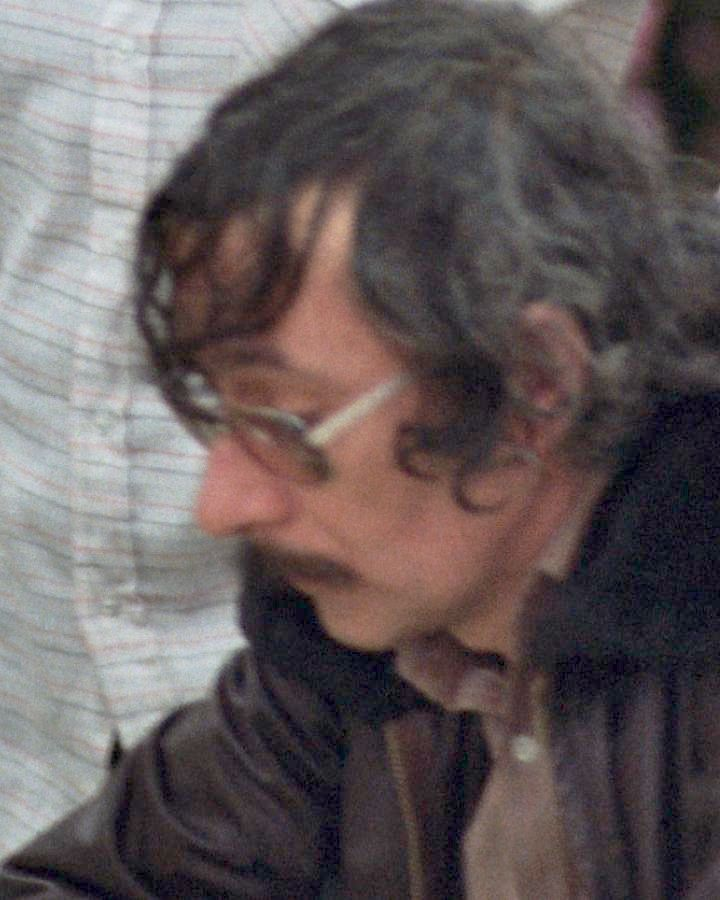

Personal information
- Born: Carlos Enrique Cuartas Bedoya; August 15, 1940 Itagüí, Colombia
- Died: July 10, 2011 (aged 70) Itagüí, Colombia

Chess career
- Country: Colombia
- Title: International Master (1975)
- Peak rating: 2440 (January 1977)

Carlos Enrique Cuartas Bedoya (15 August 1940 – 10 July 2011) was a Colombian chess International Master.

He was Colombian Champion seven times between 1965 and 1983.

Cuartas played ten times for Colombia in the Chess Olympiads.
