= Colombian Chess Championship =

Following are the official winners of the national Colombian Chess Championships from 1928 to 2020. The first Colombian Men's Championship was held in Cali in 1928, and the first Women's Championship in Bogotá in 1965.

== Men's Champions ==
Year	City	Winner
1928	Cali	Alfonso Herrera
1938	Bogotá	Luis Augusto Sánchez
1941	Bucaramanga	Miguel Cuéllar
1946	Bogotá	Miguel Cuéllar
1947	Bogotá	Luis Augusto Sánchez
1948	Bogotá	Luis Augusto Sánchez
1951	Bogotá	Boris de Greiff
1953	Bogotá	Miguel Cuéllar
1954	Cali	Luis Augusto Sánchez
1955	Manizales	Miguel Cuéllar
1956	Ibagué	Miguel Cuéllar
1957	Montería	Miguel Cuéllar
1958	Pereira	Luis Augusto Sánchez
1959	Barranquilla	Miguel Cuéllar
1961	Medellín	Miguel Cuéllar
1962	Buga	Luis Augusto Sánchez
1963	Cúcuta	Juan Minaya Molano
1964	Villavicencio	José Salvador Rodríguez
1965	Belencito (Nobsa)	Carlos Cuartas
1967	Bucaramanga	Carlos Cuartas
1968	Medellín	Carlos Cuartas
1969	Bogotá	José Salvador Rodríguez
1970	Bogotá	Carlos Cuartas
1971	Bucaramanga	Miguel Cuéllar
1972	Barranquilla	Oscar Castro
1974	Medellín–Bogotá	Oscar Castro
1975	Bogotá	Carlos Cuartas
1976	Cali	Carlos Cuartas
1977	Medellín	Gildardo García
1978	Envigado	Gildardo García
1979	Manizales	Jorge González
1980	Pereira	Alonso Zapata
1981	Bogotá	Alonso Zapata
1983	Envigado	Carlos Cuartas
1985	Bucaramanga	Gildardo García
1986	Bogotá	Gildardo García
1987	Cali	Gildardo García
1988	Bogotá	Luis Baquero
1989	Manizales	Darío Alzate
1990	Bucaramanga	Gildardo García
1991	Cartagena	Gildardo García
1992	Armenia	Oscar Castro
1993	Chía	Jorge González
1994	Medellín	Oscar Castro
1995	Cartagena	Gildardo García & Alonso Zapata
1996	Bucaramanga	Alonso Zapata
1997	Bogotá	Jorge Mario Clavijo
1998	Pensilvania	Darío Alzate
1999	Fusagasugá	Oscar Castro
2000	Bogotá	Alonso Zapata
2001	Medellín	Darío Alzate
2002	Bogotá	Alonso Zapata
2003	Cali	Gildardo García
2004	Girardot	Alonso Zapata
2005	Medellín	Darío Alzate
2006	Arauca	Gildardo García
2007	Cartagena	Alder Escobar Forero
2008	San Andrés	Alonso Zapata
2009	Buga	Duvián Castaño
2010	El Bagre	David Arenas
2011	Pereira	Sergio Barrientos
2012	Pamplona	Miguel Mosquera
2013	Tolima	Juan Camilo Torres
2014	El Bagre	Joshua Daniel Ruiz Castillo
2015	Quibdo	David Arenas
2016	La Dorada	Cristian Camilo Ríos
2017	Palmira Valle del Cauca	Joshua Daniel Ruiz Castillo
2018		
2019		
2020	Fusagasuga	Sergio Barrientos

== Women's Champions ==
Year	City	Winner
1965	Bogotá	Ilse Guggenberger
1972	Bogotá	Ilse Guggenberger
1974	Bogotá	Ilse Guggenberger
1975	Bogotá	Ilse Guggenberger
1976	Moniquirá	Teresa Leyva
1977	Bogotá	Rosalba Patiño
1978	Cartagena	Ilse Guggenberger
1979	Girardot	Ilse Guggenberger
1980	Bucaramanga	Ilse Guggenberger
1981	Riohacha	Adriana Salazar Varón
1982	Sevilla	Teresa Leyva
1983	Bucaramanga	Adriana Salazar Varón
1984	Bucaramanga	Ilse Guggenberger
1985	Bogotá	Adriana Salazar Varón
1986	Bogotá	Adriana Salazar Varón
1987	Ibagué	Isolina Majul
1988	Bogotá	Adriana Salazar Varón
1989	Armenia	Isolina Majul
1990	Bogotá	Isolina Majul
1991	Bogotá	Isolina Majul
1992	Medellín	Adriana Salazar Varón
1993	Cartagena	Adriana Salazar Varón
1994	Cartagena	Adriana Salazar Varón
1995	Saravena	Martha Liliana García
1996	Bucaramanga	Adriana Salazar Varón
1997	Bogotá	Isolina Majul
1998	Pensilvania, Caldas	Isolina Majul
1999	Cali	Isolina Majul
2000	Bogotá	Martha Mateus
2001	Cali	Nadya Karolina Ortíz
2002	Bogotá	Marisela Palao
2003	Bogotá	Martha Mateus
2004	Cali	Angela María Franco
2005	Medellín	Ingris Rivera
2006	Arauca	Nadya Carolina Ortiz
2007	Cartagena	Martha Mateus
2008	Yopal	Marisela Palao
2009	Buga	Angela Maria Franco Valencia
2010	El Bagre	Jenny Astrid Chirivi Castiblanco
2011	Pereira	Aura Cristina Salazar
2012	El Bagre	Angela Maria Franco Valencia
2013	Ibagué	Paula Andrea Rodriguez Rueda
2014	El Bagre	Beatriz Irene Franco Valencia
2015	Quibdo	Ingris Rivera
2016	La Dorada	Paula Andrea Rodriguez Rueda
2017		
2018		
2019		
2020	Fusagasuga	Melissa Castrillón Gómez
