= Jorge Zalamea Borda =

Colombian writer

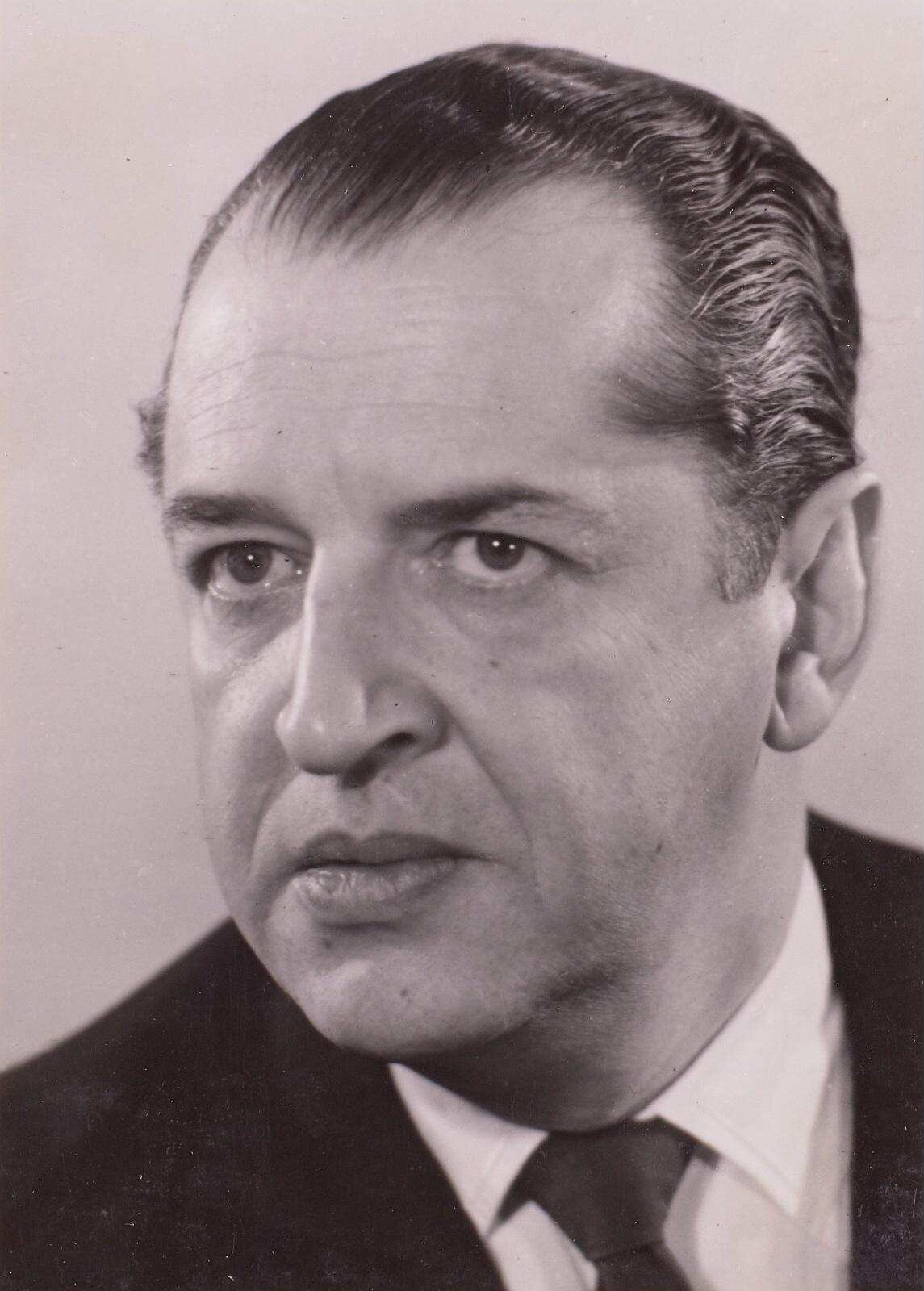
- Zalamea in January 1956

Envoy Extraordinary and Minister Plenipotentiary of Colombia to Italy
- In office 1946–1947
- President: Alberto Lleras Camargo

Colombia Ambassador to Mexico
- In office 1943–1945
- President: Alfonso López Pumarejo

19th Colombian Minister of National Education
- In office 7 August 1942 – 5 September 1942
- President: Alfonso López Pumarejo
- Preceded by: Germán Arciniegas Angueyra
- Succeeded by: Absalón Fernández de Soto

Member of the Chamber of Representatives of Colombia
- In office 1941–1942
- Constituency: Cundinamarca Department

Personal details
- Born: 8 March 1905 Bogota, D.C., Colombia
- Died: 10 May 1969 (aged 64) Bogota, D.C., Colombia
- Spouse: Amelia Costa (1928-1944)
- Children: Alberto Zalamea Costa

Jorge Zalamea Borda (March 8, 1905 – May 10, 1969) was a Colombian writer, poet, and journalist, best known for his anti-dictatorship satirical prose works. His poems, dramas, novels, and essays are notable for their linguistic richness and ascetic, dense style. He typically explored themes of equality and liberty in his writings. His best-known works include El sueño de la escalinatas and El Gran Burundú-Burundá ha muerto. He was awarded the Lenin Peace Prize in 1967.

In 1952, Zalamea fled Colombia to escape the repressive regime of president Laureano Gómez. Later that year in Buenos Aires, Argentina, he published one of his most influential works, El gran Burudún-Burundá ha muerto, a satirical work denouncing Gómez.
