= Paula Andrea Rodriguez Rueda =

Colombian chess player

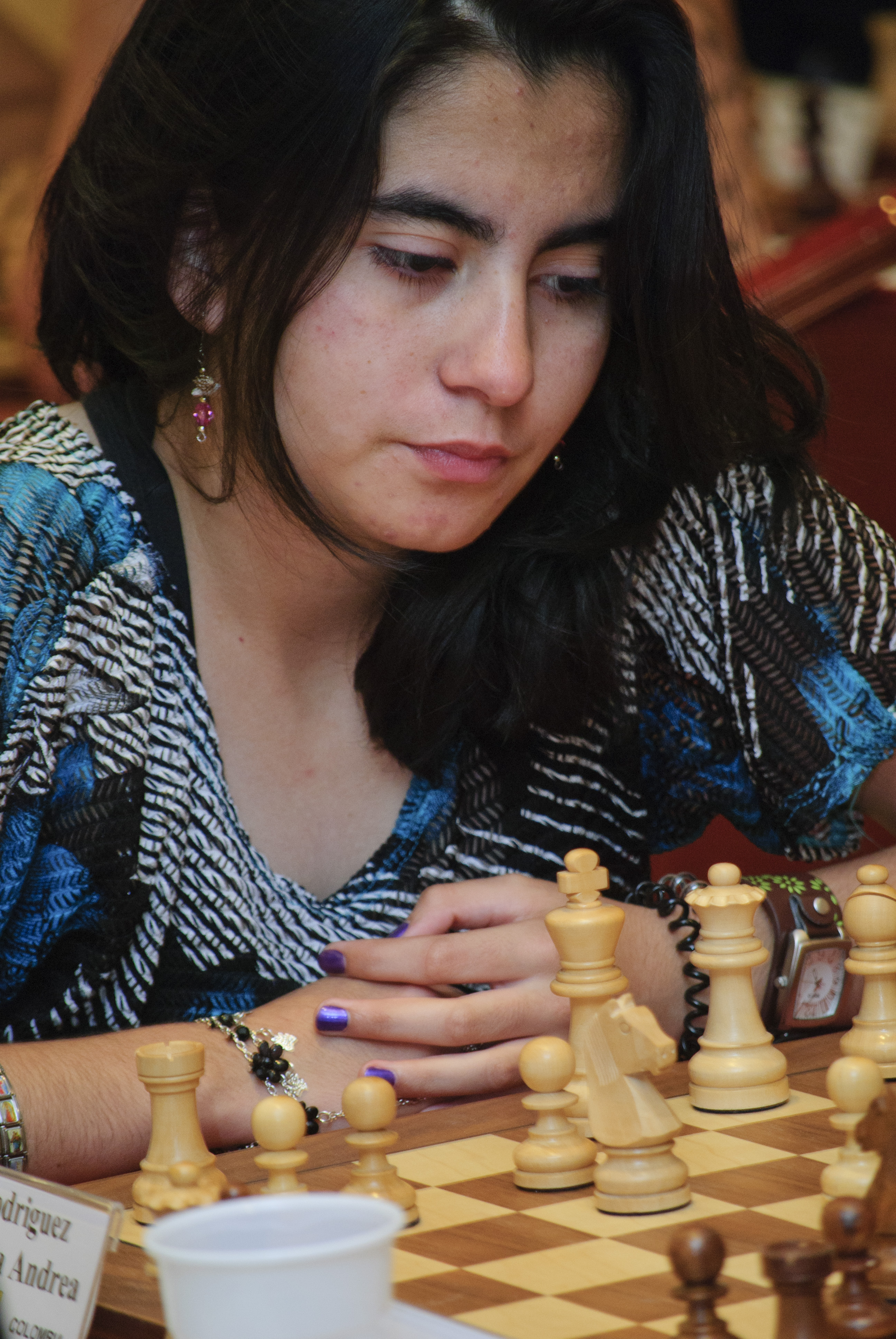
- WIM Rodriguez Rueda Paula Andrea, WChJ Athens 2012

Personal information
- Born: 7 July 1996 (age 30)

Chess career
- Country: Colombia
- Title: International Master (2014); Woman International Master (2011)
- Peak rating: 2375 (April 2015)

Paula Andrea Rodriguez Rueda (born 7 July 1996) is a Colombian chess player. She is a Woman International Master.

She won the women's Colombian Chess Championship in 2013.

As of February 2016, she is ranked world number 20 girl player.
