= Sarai Sanchez Castillo =

Venezuelan chess player (born 1981)

Personal information
- Born: Sarai Carolina Sanchez Castillo; 28 July 1981 (age 44) Valencia, Venezuela

Chess career
- Country: Venezuela
- Title: International Master (2010); Woman Grandmaster (2007)
- Peak rating: 2181 (March 2018)

Sarai Carolina Sanchez Castillo (born 28 July 1981) is a Venezuelan chess player who holds the titles of Woman Grandmaster (WGM, 2007) and International Master (IM, 2010).

== Biography ==
From 1998 to 2001, Sanchez played for Venezuela in the World Youth Chess Championship in different age groups. Her best result was in 1995 where she ranked 7th in the U14 age group in Minas Gerais and 1999 in Oropesa del Mar, where she ranked 9th in the U18 age group. In 2001 in Cusco she was the winner of the Pan American Girl's Chess Championship in the U20 age group. In 2007, in San Luis she won in the Pan American Women's Chess Championship but she lost an additional match against Marisa Zuriel to qualify for the world championship. In 2008, in Nalchik Sarai Sanchez Castillo participated in the Women's World Chess Championship 2008, where in the first round lost Pia Cramling. In 2009, in Cali she took third place in the Pan American Women's Chess Championship.

Sanchez played for Venezuela at ten Women's Chess Olympiads (2000-2018) and won individual bronze (2006) medal.

In 2007, she was awarded the FIDE Woman Grandmaster (WGM) title and received the FIDE International Master (IM) title three years later. Sanchez was the first Venezuelan chess player who was awarded the title of Woman Grandmaster. She is also a FIDE Arbiter (2014) and FIDE International Organizer (2017).
