= Jan Przewoźnik =

Polish chess player (1957–2023)

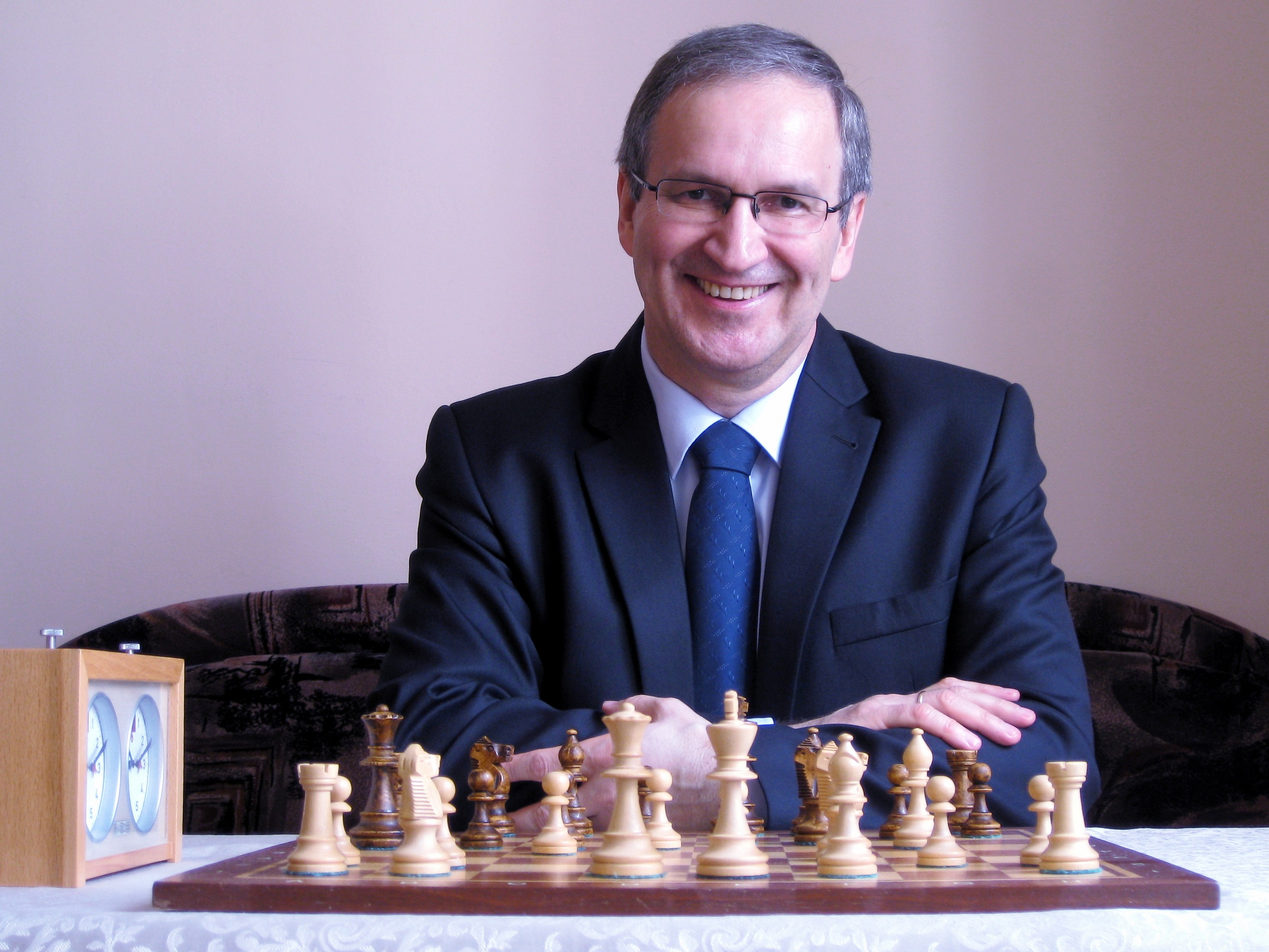
- Przewoźnik in 2014

Personal information
- Born: 16 September 1957 Katowice, Poland
- Died: 31 July 2023 (aged 65)

Chess career
- Country: Poland
- Title: International Master (1985)
- Peak rating: 2433 (October 2001)

Jan Przewoźnik (16 September 1957 – 31 July 2023) was a Polish chess player who won the Polish Chess Championship in 1979 and became FIDE International Master (1985).

== Chess career ==
From 1976 to 1992, Przewoźnik played seven times in the Polish Chess Championship's finals. In 1979 he won title in Tarnów. Przewoźnik was a multiple medalist in Polish Team Chess Championship, including six gold medals. He shared first place in international tournament in Helsinki (1991) and second place in Nałęczów (1986).

Przewoźnik played for Poland in Chess Olympiads:

- In 1980, at second reserve board in the 24th Chess Olympiad in La Valletta (+1, =1, -2).

== Psychology ==
Przewoźnik graduated Faculty of Psychology from Catholic University of Lublin (1984). Despite a high level of chess, he worked as a business consultant in psychology. In March 2014 Przewoźnik defended Doctor degree thesis "Thinking strategies in complex chess game situations".

== Death ==
Jan Przewoźnik died on 31 July 2023, at the age of 65.
