= Venecia, Antioquia =

- Municipality and town
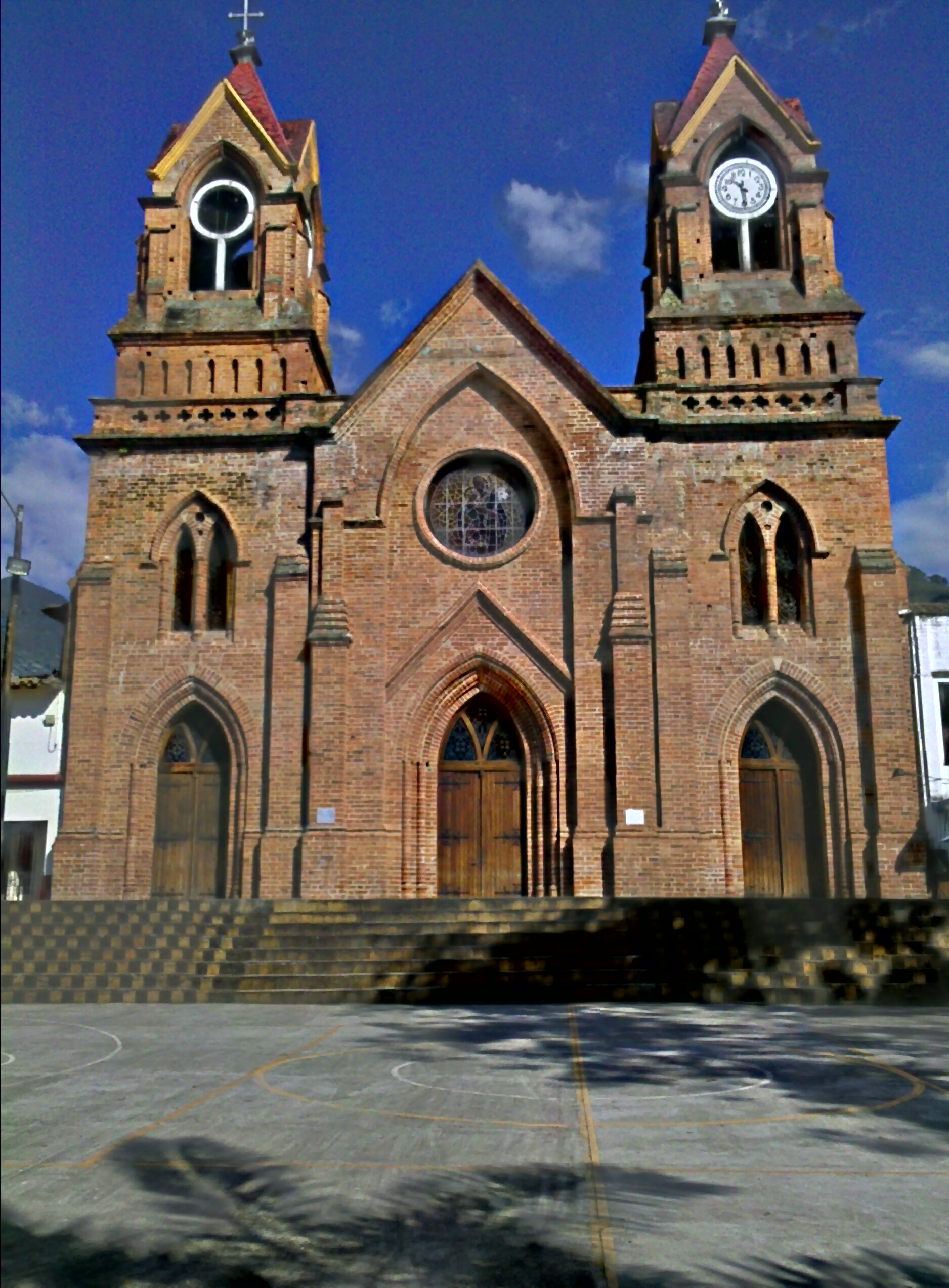

- Flag Coat of arms

- Location of the municipality and town of Venecia, Antioquia in the Antioquia Department of Colombia

- Location in Colombia
- Coordinates: 5°57′39″N 75°44′1″W
- Country: Colombia
- Department: Antioquia Department
- Subregion: Southwestern

Area
  - Total: 141 km^{2} (54 sq mi)

Population (Census 2018)
  - Total: 10,280
  - Density: 72.9/km^{2} (189/sq mi)
- Time zone: UTC-5 (Colombia Standard Time)

Venecia is a town and municipality in southwest region of the Antioquia Department, Colombia. According to the 2018 census, the population comprised 10,280 people. The town includes Cerro Tusa, a pyramid-shaped mountain, and another mountain known as Cerro Bravo.

The town was named after Venice, Italy because the area originally contained a large lagoon.

== History ==
The settlement, from which later became the town, was founded on the 13 of January 1898. Venecia Municipality was isolated in a separate administrative unit in 1909.

== Climate ==
Climate data for Venecia (Rosario El), elevation 1,600 m (5,200 ft), (1981–2010)
Month	Jan	Feb	Mar	Apr	May	Jun	Jul	Aug	Sep	Oct	Nov	Dec	Year
Mean daily maximum °C (°F)	25.0 (77.0)	25.6 (78.1)	26.1 (79.0)	24.9 (76.8)	24.5 (76.1)	25.0 (77.0)	25.4 (77.7)	25.2 (77.4)	24.6 (76.3)	23.6 (74.5)	23.8 (74.8)	24.4 (75.9)	24.8 (76.6)
Daily mean °C (°F)	20.3 (68.5)	20.7 (69.3)	21.0 (69.8)	20.3 (68.5)	20.1 (68.2)	20.5 (68.9)	20.8 (69.4)	20.6 (69.1)	19.9 (67.8)	19.1 (66.4)	19.4 (66.9)	19.9 (67.8)	20.2 (68.4)
Mean daily minimum °C (°F)	16.0 (60.8)	16.3 (61.3)	16.5 (61.7)	16.3 (61.3)	16.1 (61.0)	16.2 (61.2)	16.0 (60.8)	16.0 (60.8)	15.6 (60.1)	15.4 (59.7)	15.8 (60.4)	16.1 (61.0)	16.0 (60.8)
Average precipitation mm (inches)	92.1 (3.63)	105.6 (4.16)	168.6 (6.64)	253.9 (10.00)	345.9 (13.62)	248.6 (9.79)	188.1 (7.41)	237.9 (9.37)	297.9 (11.73)	310.8 (12.24)	259.0 (10.20)	166.3 (6.55)	2,674.7 (105.30)
Average precipitation days (≥ 1.0 mm)	14	15	16	22	23	17	15	18	21	25	22	17	224
Average relative humidity (%)	72	70	69	76	78	74	69	70	75	80	80	76	74
Mean monthly sunshine hours	176.7	160.9	167.4	138.0	148.8	186.0	217.0	198.4	156.0	124.0	132.0	176.7	1,981.9
Mean daily sunshine hours	5.7	5.7	5.4	4.6	4.8	6.2	7.0	6.4	5.2	4.0	4.4	5.7	5.4
Source: Instituto de Hidrologia Meteorologia y Estudios Ambientales
