= Gildardo García =

Colombian chess grandmaster (1954–2021)

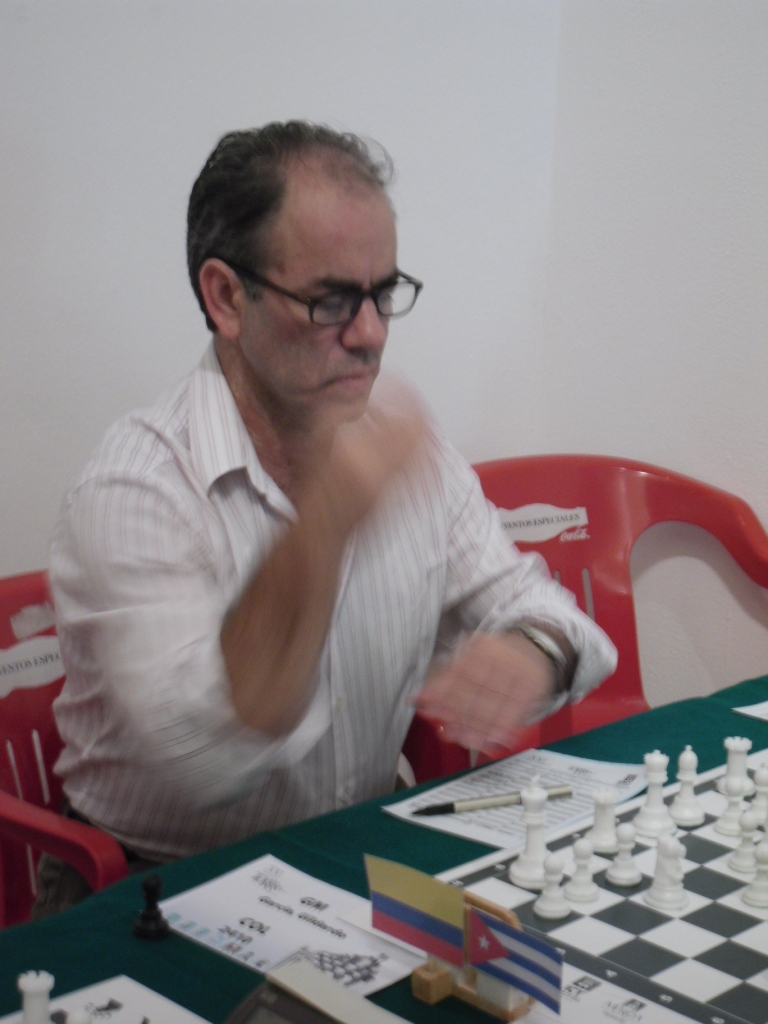

Personal information
- Born: 9 March 1954 Medellín, Colombia
- Died: 15 January 2021 (aged 66) Medellín, Colombia

Chess career
- Country: Colombia
- Title: Grandmaster (2008)
- Peak rating: 2540 (July 1994)

Gildardo García (9 March 1954 – 15 January 2021) was a Colombian chess grandmaster.

== Biography ==
García became Colombia's second Grandmaster in 1992. His highest rating was 2540 (in July 1994) and he was ranked 14th in Colombia at the time of his death.

He won the Colombian national championship 10 times, in 1977, 1978, 1985, 1986, 1987, 1990, 1991, 1995, 2003, and 2006. In 1974, he won the inaugural Pan American Junior Chess Championship. In 2006, he played in the 37th Chess Olympiad for Colombia.

He died from COVID-19 in Medellín on 15 January 2021, during the COVID-19 pandemic in Colombia.
