= Boris de Greiff =

Colombian chess player and writer (1930–2011)

Boris de Greiff Bernal
Personal information
- Born: 13 February 1930 Medellín, Antioquia, Colombia
- Died: 31 October 2011 (aged 81) Bogotá, Colombia

Chess career
- Country: Colombia
- Title: International Master (1957)
- Peak rating: 2370 (July 1972)

Boris de Greiff Bernal (13 February 1930 – 31 October 2011) was a Colombian chess master and writer, born in Medellín. He was the son of the Colombian poet León de Greiff.

A student at the San Bartolome Mayor School, in 1951, he won the Colombian Championship in Bogotá. In 1955, he took 16th place in Mar del Plata (Borislav Ivkov won). In 1957, he won in Caracas (zonal). In 1958, he took 20th place in Portorož (interzonal; Mikhail Tal won). In 1958, he ranked 9th in Bogotá (Oscar Panno won). In 1962, he took 18th place in Havana (1st Capablanca Memorial; Miguel Najdorf won). In 1963, he finished 20th in Havana (2nd Capablanca Memorial; Viktor Korchnoi won). In 1963, he took 7th place in Havana (Torneo Panamericano; Eleazar Jiménez won). In 1969, he tied for 1st–2nd with Miguel Cuéllar in Bogotá. In 1970, he tied for 8–10th in Bogotá (Henrique Mecking won). In 1973, he ranked 15th in Cienfueogos (10th Capablanca Memorial; Vasily Smyslov won).

De Greiff played for Colombia in nine Chess Olympiads.

- In 1954, at second board in 11th Chess Olympiad in Amsterdam (+8 –6 =4);
- In 1956, at third board in 12th Chess Olympiad in Moscow (+7 –3 =9);
- In 1958, at third board in 13th Chess Olympiad in Munich (+2 –2 =15);
- In 1966, at third board in 17th Chess Olympiad in Havana (+4 –4 =8);
- In 1970, at first reserve board in 19th Chess Olympiad in Siegen (+3 –4 =1);
- In 1972, at fourth board in 20th Chess Olympiad in Skopje (+4 –4 =8);
- In 1974, at first reserve board in 21st Chess Olympiad in Nice (+6 –0 =6);
- In 1976, at first reserve board in 22nd Chess Olympiad in Haifa (+4 –0 =3);
- In 1978, at first reserve board in 23rd Chess Olympiad in Buenos Aires (+0 –1 =2).

He died in Bogotá.

== Awards ==
- He won the individual gold medal at Haifa 1976, and the silver medal at Nice 1974.
- He was awarded the title of International Master in 1957 and International Arbiter in 1978.
- He was elected an Honorary Member of FIDE in 2002.
