= Alonso Zapata =

Colombian chess grandmaster (born 1958)

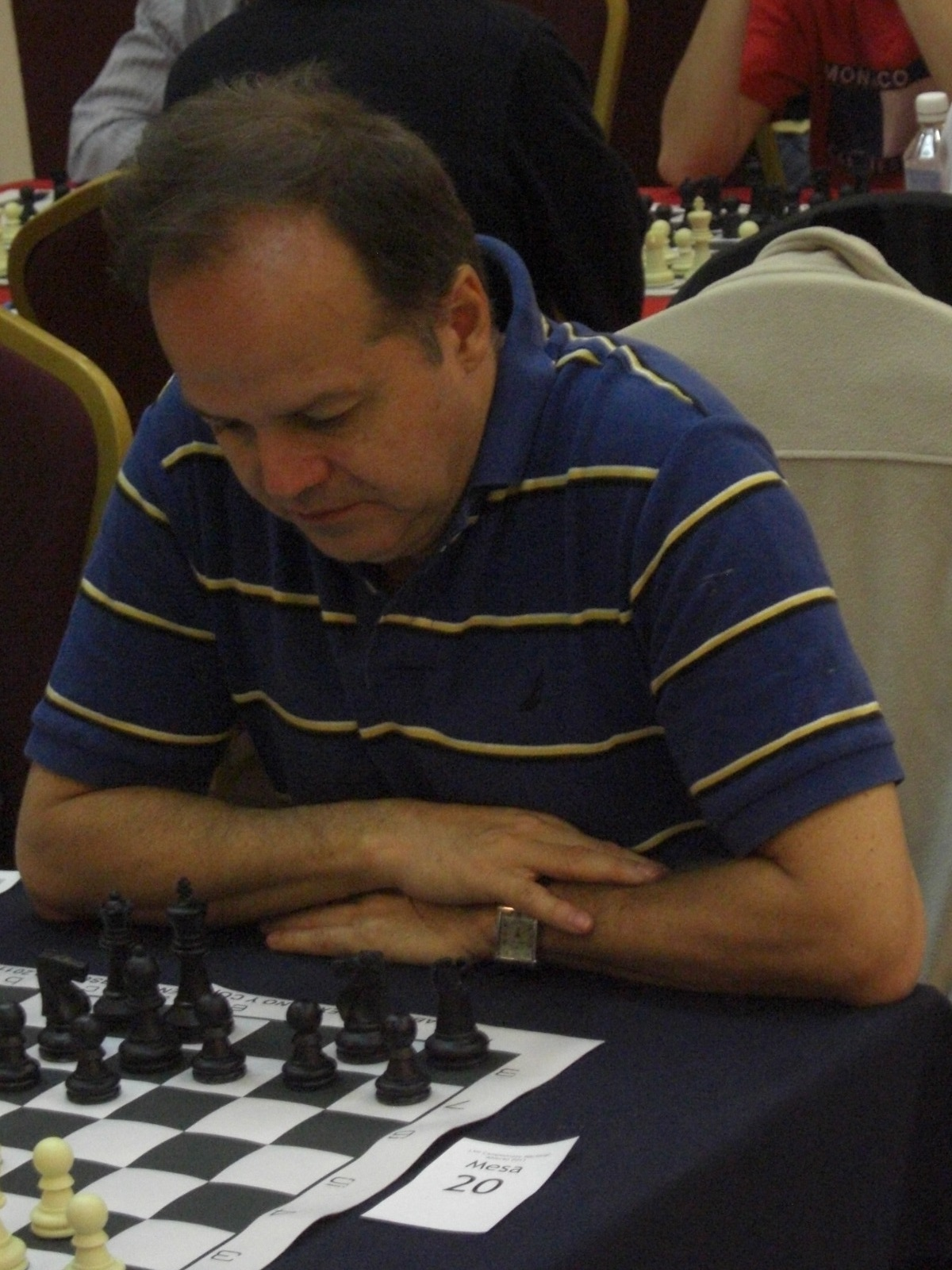
- Zapata in 2011

Personal information
- Born: Alonso Zapata Ramirez; August 22, 1958 (age 67) Pereira, Colombia

Chess career
- Country: Colombia
- Title: Grandmaster (1984)
- Peak rating: 2580 (January 1993)

Alonso Zapata Ramirez (born August 22, 1958) is a Colombian chess grandmaster and eight-time Colombian Chess Champion.

== Chess career ==
Zapata has won the Colombian Chess Championship in 1980, 1981, 1995 (joint), 1996, 2000, 2002, 2004, and 2008.

Zapata played twelve times for Colombia in the Chess Olympiads (1978–1992, 1996–1998, 2002 and 2012).

He finished second, behind Artur Yusupov, in the 16th World Junior Chess Championship at Innsbruck in 1977, tied for third and fourth at Havana in 1983, and twice shared first, at Cienfuegos in 1980, and Matanzas in 1994 (Capablanca Memorial).

Zapata was awarded the International Master (IM) title in 1980 and the grandmaster title in 1984.

In 1988, Zapata beat future world champion Viswanathan Anand in only six moves.

In 2014, shortly after relocating to Atlanta, Zapata won the Southeast Open, held at Emory University, with 4.5/5.

In 2018, Zapata tied for first place in the inaugural National Senior Tournament of Champions.

In 2019, Zapata won clear first place in the Charlotte Chess Center's IM-B Norm Round Robin Tournament held in Charlotte, North Carolina with an undefeated score of 7.5/9.

Zapata won the Georgia State Championship five times: 2013, 2014 (tied), 2016, 2021 (tied), and 2022, and the Georgia State Senior Championship four times: 2016, 2019, 2021, and 2024 (tied).
