= Ilse Guggenberger =

Colombian chess player

Personal information
- Full name: Ilse D. Guggenberger
- Born: 1 April 1942 (age 84)

Chess career
- Country: Colombia
- Title: Woman International Master (1978)
- Peak rating: 2085 (July 1988)

Ilse D. Guggenberger (née de Caro, born 1 April 1942) is a Colombian chess master.

She was the Colombian Women's Champion in 1965, 1972, 1974, 1975, 1978, 1979, 1980, and 1984.

She played six times for Colombia in Chess Olympiads (1974, 1978, 1980, 1982, 1984, and 1988).

Guggenberger was awarded the Woman International Master (WIM) title in 1977.
