= Chess at the 2022 South American Games =

Chess competitions at the 2022 South American Games

- Venue: Polideportivo Urbano
- Dates: October 8−9
- Nations: 12

Chess competitions at the 2022 South American Games in Asunción, Paraguay are scheduled to be held between October 8 and 9, 2022 at the Polideportivo Urbano

== Medal summary ==
=== Medal table ===
* Host nation (Paraguay)

Rank	Nation	Gold	Silver	Bronze	Total
1	Peru (PER)	3	3	0	6
2	Paraguay (PAR)*	2	0	3	5
3	Argentina (ARG)	1	3	1	5
4	Chile (CHI)	0	0	1	1
4	Colombia (COL)	0	0	1	1
Totals (5 entries)		6	6	6	18

=== Medalists ===
==== Men ====
Event	Gold	Silver	Bronze
Men's blitz	Axel Bachmann; Paraguay	Jorge Cori; Peru	Pablo Salinas Herrera; Chile
Men's rapid	Axel Bachmann; Paraguay	Jorge Cori; Peru	Federico Perez Ponsa; Argentina

==== Women ====
Event	Gold	Silver	Bronze
Women's blitz	Deysi Cori; Peru	Claudia Amura; Argentina	Gabriela Vargas; Paraguay
Women's rapid	Claudia Amura; Argentina	Deysi Cori; Peru	Beatriz Franco; Colombia

==== Mixed ====
Event	Gold	Silver	Bronze
Mixed team blitz	Deysi Cori; Jorge Cori; Peru	Claudia Amura; Federico Perez Ponsa; Argentina	Gabriela Vargas; Axel Bachmann; Paraguay
Mixed team rapid	Deysi Cori; Jorge Cori; Peru	Claudia Amura; Federico Perez Ponsa; Argentina	Gabriela Vargas; Axel Bachmann; Paraguay

== Participation ==
Twelve nations will participate in chess of the 2022 South American Games.

- Argentina
- Bolivia
- Brazil
- Chile
- Colombia
- Curaçao
- Panama
- Paraguay
- Peru
- Suriname
- Uruguay
- Venezuela

== Results ==
=== Men's Blitz ===
Rank	Athlete	Nation	R1	R2	R3	R4	R5	R6	R7	Pts	T-DES1	T-DES2	T-DES3	T-DES4	T-DES5
1st place, gold medalist(s)	Axel Bachmann	Paraguay	1	1	½	1	1	1	0	5½	0.00	0.00	22.00	23.00	17.75
2nd place, silver medalist(s)	Jorge Cori	Peru	1	0	1	0	1	1	1	5	0.00	0.00	20.50	21.50	16.50
3rd place, bronze medalist(s)	Pablo Salinas Herrera	Chile	½	1	1	0	1	0	1	4½	1.00	0.00	26.00	28.50	18.50
4	Federico Perez Ponsa	Argentina	½	1	½	1	½	1	0	4½	1.50	0.50	24.00	26.50	18.50
5	Jorge Baúles	Panama	½	1	0	1	0	1	1	4½	0.50	0.50	23.50	24.50	13.75
6	Nathan Filgueiras	Brazil	0	1	1	0	0	1	1	4	1.00	1.00	21.50	22.50	11.00
7	Facundo Vazquez	Uruguay	½	0	1	0	1	0	1	3½	0.00	0.00	22.00	23.50	11.00
8	Viresh Giasi	Suriname	1	0	0	½	0	½	0	2	0.00	0.00	23.50	24.50	6.25
9	José Luis Castro	Venezuela	½	0	0	1	1	½	1	4	0.00	0.00	19.00	20.00	12.75
10	José Daniel Gemy	Bolivia	½	0	1	1	½	0	0	3	0.00	0.00	26.50	29.00	12.50
11	Andrés Escobar	Colombia	0	1	0	½	0	0	0	1½	0.00	0.00	24.00	25.50	4.50

=== Men's Rapid ===
Rank	Athlete	Nation	R1	R2	R3	R4	R5	R6	R7	Pts	T-DES1	T-DES2	T-DES3	T-DES4	T-DES5
1st place, gold medalist(s)	Axel Bachmann	Paraguay	1	1	1	1	1	1	½	6½	0	26	29.0	26.8	2822.00
2nd place, silver medalist(s)	Jorge Cori	Peru	1	0	1	1	0	1	1	5	1	26	28.5	17.0	2548.00
3rd place, bronze medalist(s)	Federico Perez Ponsa	Argentina	1	1	0	1	0	1	1	5	0	27	28.0	17.0	2508.00
4	Pablo Salinas Herrera	Chile	½	1	0	1	1	0	1	4½	0	25	25.0	11.8	2451.00
5	Andrés Escobar	Colombia	0	1	0	1	1	1	½	4½	0	22	22.0	10.2	2368.00
6	José Daniel Gemy	Bolivia	0	1	0	1	1	0	1	4	0	23	23.0	8.5	2357.00
7	José Luis Castro	Venezuela	1	0	1	0	0	0	1	3	0	23	23.0	3.0	2208.00
8	Facundo Vazquez	Uruguay	½	0	1	0	1	1	0	3½	0	25	26.0	9.8	2346.00
9	Jorge Baúles	Panama	1	0	1	0	0	1	0	3	0	26	25.5	5.0	2236.00
10	Nathan Filgueiras	Brazil	0	1	0	0	1	1	0	2	0	21	21.0	1.0	2081.00
11	Viresh Giasi	Suriname	0	0	1	0	0	0	0	1	0	21	21.0	0.0	1941.00
12	Rishab Anandbahadoer	Curaçao	0	0	0	0	0	0	0	0	0	21	22.0	0.0	1464.00

=== Women's Blitz ===
Rank	Athlete	Nation	R1	R2	R3	R4	R5	R6	R7	Pts	T-DES1	T-DES2	T-DES3	T-DES4	T-DES5
1st place, gold medalist(s)	Deysi Cori	Peru	1	1	½	1	1	1	1	6½	1	23.50	25.00	24.00	2415.00
2nd place, silver medalist(s)	Claudia Amura	Argentina	1	1	½	1	½	1	0	6	1	25.00	25.50	22.00	2139.00
3rd place, bronze medalist(s)	Gabriela Vargas	Paraguay	1	0	1	1	½	½	½	4½	0	26.50	29.00	17.75	2090.00
4	Beatriz Franco	Colombia	1	1	0	0	1	0	1	4	1	26.00	27.50	12.50	2004.00
5	Ely Cordero	Bolivia	0	1	½	1	0	1	½	4	0.50	24.50	25.00	10.50	1885.00
6	Marina Miranda	Brazil	1	0	1	0	1	0	1	4	0	22.00	22.50	10.00	1890.00
7	Andreina Quevedo	Uruguay	0	1	1	0	0	0	1	3	0	23.50	24.00	8.00	1760.00
8	Monserrat Morales	Chile	0	1	0	1	1	½	0	3½	1	23.00	24.50	11.25	1850.00
9	Catherine Kaslan	Suriname	0	0	½	1	1	1	1	3½	0.50	21.00	21.50	9.50	1773.00
10	Annyo Otazo	Venezuela	0	0	1	0	0	1	0	2	0	22.50	23.00	4.50	1549.00
11	Dianthely Pourier	Curaçao	1	0	0	0	0	0	0	1	0	21.50	23.00	3.50	1061.00

=== Women's Rapid ===
Rank	Athlete	Nation	R1	R2	R3	R4	R5	R6	R7	Pts	T-DES1	T-DES2	T-DES3	T-DES4	T-DES5
1st place, gold medalist(s)	Claudia Amura	Argentina	1	1	1	1	1	1	1	7	0	22	23	83.00	15635.00
2nd place, silver medalist(s)	Deysi Cori	Peru	1	1	0	1	1	1	1	6	1	24	26	81.00	15447.00
3rd place, bronze medalist(s)	Beatriz Franco	Colombia	1	0	1	0	0	1	1	4	2	26	27	44.50	12273.00
4	Andreina Quevedo	Uruguay	0	0	1	0	1	0	1	3	1	18	18	27.50	8948.00
5	Catherine Kaslan	Suriname	0	1	0	1	0	0	1	3	1	24	24	24.25	6813.00
6	Annyo Otazo	Venezuela	0	1	0	0	0	1	1	3	1	20	20	29.50	10506.00
7	Gabriela Vargas	Paraguay	0	0	0	0	1	1	0	2	1	26	26	29.50	9344.00
8	Ely Cordero	Bolivia	1	0	1	1	1	0	0	4	1	22	24	38.50	8923.00
9	Monserrat Morales	Chile	0	1	0	1	0	1	0	3	0	27	30	41.50	12396.00
10	Marina Miranda	Brazil	1	0	0	1	0	0	0	2	0	22	24	27.25	9378.00
11	Dianthely Pourier	Curaçao	1	0	0	0	0	0	0	0	1	24	27	14.00	4885.00

=== Mixed team blitz ===
Rank	Athlete	Nation	Pts
1st place, gold medalist(s)	Jorge Cori / Deysi Cori	Peru	11.50
2nd place, silver medalist(s)	Federico Pérez Ponsa / Claudia Amura	Argentina	10.50
3rd place, bronze medalist(s)	Axel Bachmann / Gabriela Vargas	Paraguay	10.00

=== Mixed team rapid ===
Rank	Athlete	Nation
1st place, gold medalist(s)	Jorge Cori / Deysi Cori	Peru
2nd place, silver medalist(s)	Federico Pérez Ponsa / Claudia Amura	Argentina
3rd place, bronze medalist(s)	Axel Bachmann / Gabriela Vargas	Paraguay
