= Chess World Cup 2017 =

Chess tournament in Tbilisi, Georgia

FIDE Chess World Cup 2017
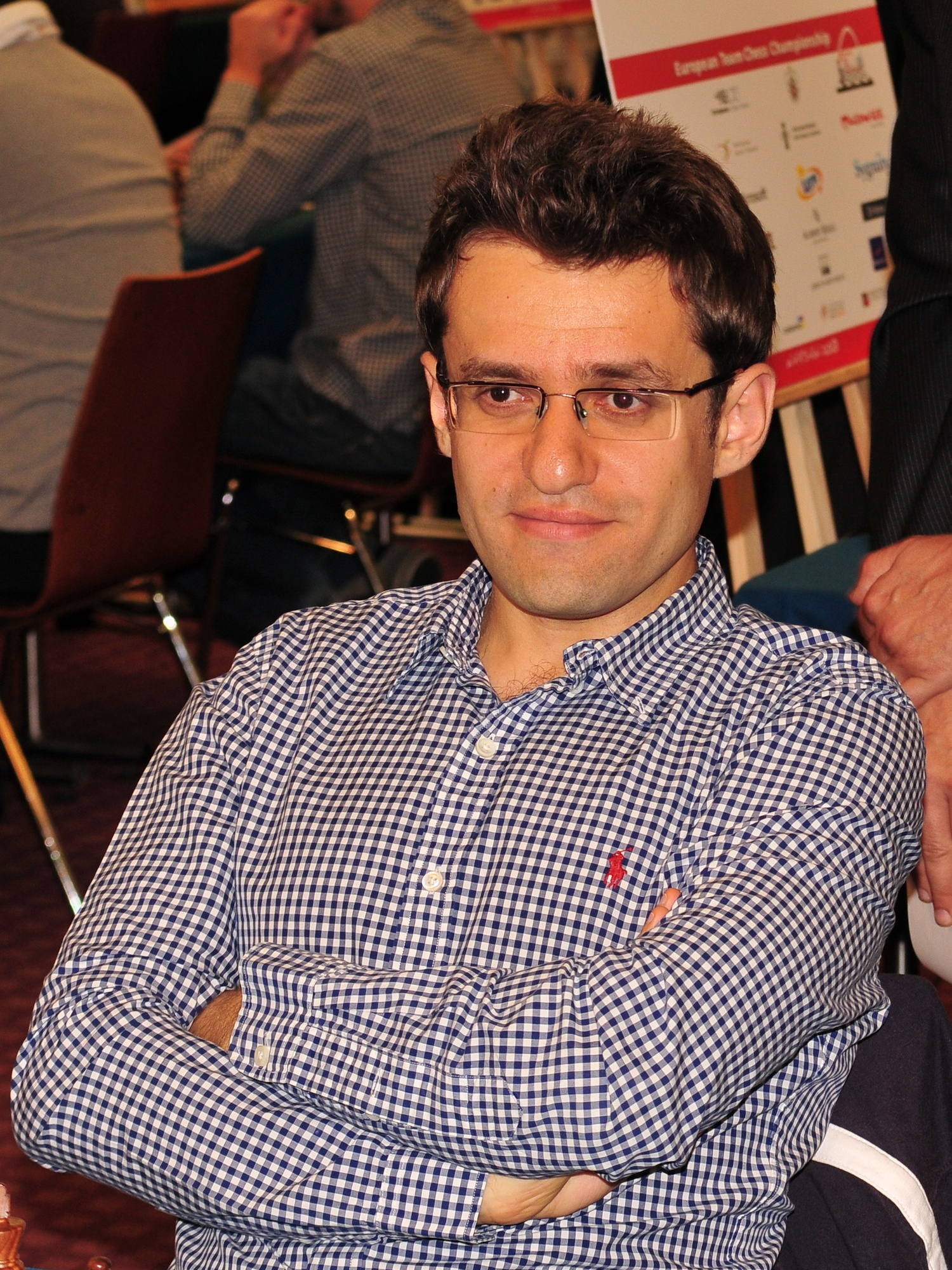
- 2017 FIDE World Cup winner Levon Aronian.

Tournament information
- Sport: Chess
- Location: Tbilisi, Georgia
- Dates: 2 September 2017–27 September 2017
- Administrator: FIDE
- Tournament format: Single elimination tournament
- Host: Chess Federation of Georgia

Final positions
- Champion: (Armenia) Levon Aronian
- Runner-up: (China) Ding Liren

The Chess World Cup 2017 was a 128-player single-elimination chess tournament, held in Tbilisi, Georgia, from 2 to 27 September 2017. It was won by Armenian grandmaster Levon Aronian. This was the second time he had won the Chess World Cup, 12 years after his first win in 2005. It was the 7th edition of the Chess World Cup.

The top two finishers in the tournament, Aronian and Ding Liren, qualified for the Candidates Tournament 2018 for the World Chess Championship 2018.

== Bidding process ==
At the 85th FIDE Congress held during the 41st Chess Olympiad, FIDE received bids to host the World Cup 2017 and 2018 Olympiad from the national federations of Georgia and South Africa. South Africa proposed Sun City and Durban as venues, while Georgia proposed Tbilisi and Batumi respectively. Although Garry Kasparov expressed support for the South African bid during his FIDE presidential campaign, Georgia's bid won, receiving 93 votes to South Africa's 58.

== Format ==
The tournament was a knock-out format, with the exception that there was a provision for the two semi-final losers to play off for third place if necessary (see #Candidates qualification).

Matches consist of two regular time limit games (except for the final, and playoff for third if required, which consist of four regular time limit games). For these two games, players have 90 minutes for the first 40 moves followed by 30 minutes for the rest of the game, with an increment of 30 seconds per move from the start of the game.

If a match is tied after the regular games, tie breaks will be played the next day. The format for the tie breaks is as follows:

- Two rapid games (25 minutes plus 10 seconds increment).
- If the score is tied after two rapid games, further two rapid games (10 minutes plus 10 seconds increment) are played.
- If the score is tied after four rapid games, the opponents play two blitz games (five minutes plus three seconds increment).
- If the score is tied after a pair of blitz games, an armageddon game (in which a draw counts as a win for Black) is played. White has 5 minutes and Black has 4 minutes, with an increment of 3 seconds/move starting from move 61.

== Candidates qualification ==
The tournament qualified two players for the 2018 Candidates Tournament.

However Magnus Carlsen (world champion) and Sergey Karjakin (already seeded to the Candidates) had no need for qualification, and both participated in the tournament (even though it is highly unusual for the defending champion to do so). So the rules were actually that the top two finishers other than Carlsen and Karjakin would qualify for the Candidates. This meant there was provision for a match for third place, between the two semi-final losers, if necessary.

As it turned out, both Carlsen and Karjakin were eliminated in the first three rounds, so the two Candidates qualifiers were simply the two finalists: Armenia's Levon Aronian and China's Ding Liren.

== Schedule ==
Each of the first six rounds takes three days: one day each for the two regular time limit games, then a third day for tie breaks, if required. The final round has four days of regular time limit games, then a fifth day for tie breaks, if required.

- Round 1: September 3–5
- Round 2: September 6–8
- Round 3: September 9–11
- Round 4: September 12–14
- Round 5: September 15–17
- Rest day: September 18
- Round 6: September 19–21
- Rest day: September 22
- Final (and play-off for third place if required): September 23–27

All rounds begin at 15:00 local time (11:00 UTC).

== Prize money ==
Round	Prize	Total
Round 1	64 × US $6,000	US $384,000
Round 2	32 × US $10,000	US $320,000
Round 3	16 × US $16,000	US $256,000
Round 4	8 × US $25,000	US $200,000
Round 5	4 × US $35,000	US $140,000
Round 6	2 × US $50,000	US $100,000
Runner-up	US $80,000	US $80,000
Winner	US $120,000	US $120,000
Total		US $1,600,000

According to the regulations, all players have to pay their own expenses for travel, and 20% of each player's prize money goes to FIDE.

== Participants ==
The participants are seeded by their FIDE rating of August 2017. All players are grandmasters unless indicated otherwise.

1. Magnus Carlsen (NOR), 2822 (World Champion)
2. Wesley So (USA), 2810 (R)
3. Fabiano Caruana (USA), 2807 (R)
4. Vladimir Kramnik (RUS), 2803 (R)
5. Levon Aronian (ARM), 2799 (R)
6. Shakhriyar Mamedyarov (AZE), 2797 (R)
7. Hikaru Nakamura (USA), 2792 (R)
8. Maxime Vachier-Lagrave (FRA), 2789 (R)
9. Alexander Grischuk (RUS), 2783 (R)
10. Viswanathan Anand (IND), 2783 (R)
11. Ding Liren (CHN), 2777 (R)
12. Sergey Karjakin (RUS), 2773 (WC)
13. Anish Giri (NED), 2772 (WC)
14. Wei Yi (CHN), 2753 (AS16)
15. Ian Nepomniachtchi (RUS), 2751 (R)
16. Peter Svidler (RUS), 2751 (WC)
17. Radosław Wojtaszek (POL), 2745 (E16)
18. Yu Yangyi (CHN), 2744 (R)
19. Li Chao (CHN), 2744 (R)
20. Pentala Harikrishna (IND), 2743 (R)
21. Teimour Radjabov (AZE), 2742 (ON)
22. Lê Quang Liêm (VIE), 2739 (AS16)
23. Michael Adams (ENG), 2738 (R)
24. David Navara (CZE), 2737 (E16)
25. Pavel Eljanov (UKR), 2734 (WC)
26. Vladimir Fedoseev (RUS), 2731 (E17)
27. Boris Gelfand (ISR), 2729 (R)
28. Maxim Matlakov (RUS), 2728 (E17)
29. Vassily Ivanchuk (UKR), 2728 (ACP)
30. Nikita Vitiugov (RUS), 2724 (E16)
31. Francisco Vallejo Pons (ESP), 2717 (E16)
32. Étienne Bacrot (FRA), 2715 (E17)
33. Bu Xiangzhi (CHN), 2710 (AS17)
34. Evgeny Tomashevsky (RUS), 2710 (R)
35. Evgeniy Najer (RUS), 2707 (E16)
36. Jan-Krzysztof Duda (POL), 2707 (E17)
37. Dmitry Andreikin (RUS), 2706 (R)
38. Wang Hao (CHN), 2702 (AS17)
39. Ernesto Inarkiev (RUS), 2702 (E16)
40. David Howell (ENG), 2702 (E17)
41. Ivan Cheparinov (BUL), 2696 (E16)
42. Maxim Rodshtein (ISR), 2695 (E17)
43. Vidit Santosh Gujrathi (IND), 2693 (AS17)
44. Vladislav Artemiev (RUS), 2692 (E17)
45. Ruslan Ponomariov (UKR), 2692 (PN)
46. Liviu-Dieter Nisipeanu (GER), 2687 (E16)
47. Baadur Jobava (GEO), 2687 (E16)
48. Alexander Onischuk (USA), 2682 (Z2.1)
49. Bassem Amin (EGY), 2680 (AF)
50. Baskaran Adhiban (IND), 2677 (PN)
51. Richárd Rapport (HUN), 2675 (R)
52. Alexander Motylev (RUS), 2675 (E17)
53. Daniil Dubov (RUS), 2666 (E16)
54. Martyn Kravtsiv (UKR), 2665 (E17)
55. Varuzhan Akobian (USA), 2662 (Z2.1)
56. Gawain Jones (ENG), 2660 (E17)
57. Boris Grachev (RUS), 2654 (E17)
58. David Antón Guijarro (ESP), 2654 (E16)
59. Yuriy Kuzubov (UKR), 2652 (E17)
60. Hou Yifan (CHN), 2652 (PN)
61. Alexander Areshchenko (UKR), 2652 (E17)
62. Laurent Fressinet (FRA), 2650 (E16)
63. Sandro Mareco (ARG), 2650 (Z2.5)
64. Aleksey Dreev (RUS), 2648 (E16)
65. Axel Bachmann (PAR), 2648 (AM17)
66. Matthias Blübaum (GER), 2646 (E17)
67. Luka Lenič (SLO), 2646 (E17)
68. Anton Demchenko (RUS), 2645 (E16)
69. Kacper Piorun (POL), 2644 (E16)
70. Sergei Zhigalko (BLR), 2644 (E16)
71. Lázaro Bruzón (CUB), 2643 (AM17)
72. Hrant Melkumyan (ARM), 2642 (E17)
73. Jorge Cori (PER), 2641 (Z2.4)
74. Anton Kovalyov (CAN), 2641 (AM16)
75. Igor Kovalenko (LAT), 2640 (E16)
76. Daniel Fridman (GER), 2640 (E17)
77. Jeffery Xiong (USA), 2633 (J16)
78. Emilio Córdova (PER), 2629 (AM16)
79. Nguyễn Ngọc Trường Sơn (VIE), 2629 (Z3.3)
80. Viktor Erdős (HUN), 2628 (E17)
81. Yaroslav Zherebukh (USA), 2627 (Z2.1)
82. Iván Salgado López (ESP), 2627 (E16)
83. Samuel Sevian (USA), 2620 (AM17)
84. S. P. Sethuraman (IND), 2618 (AS16)
85. Benjamin Bok (NED), 2615 (E17)
86. Neuris Delgado Ramírez (PAR), 2614 (AM17)
87. Robert Hovhannisyan (ARM), 2606 (E16)
88. Dimitrios Mastrovasilis (GRE), 2596 (E17)
89. Aryan Tari (NOR), 2591 (E16)
90. Mikheil Mchedlishvili (GEO), 2590 (ON)
91. Deep Sengupta (IND), 2589 (AS16)
92. Aleksey Goganov (RUS), 2586 (E16)
93. Levan Pantsulaia (GEO), 2585 (ON)
94. Aleksej Aleksandrov (BLR), 2580 (E17)
95. Mikhail Antipov (RUS), 2580 (J15)
96. Diego Flores (ARG), 2580 (AM16)
97. Alexandr Fier (BRA), 2579 (AM17)
98. Karthikeyan Murali (IND), 2579 (Z3.7)
99. Kaido Külaots (EST), 2577 (PN)
100. Murtas Kazhgaleyev (KAZ), 2576 (AS16)
101. Julio Sadorra (PHI), 2575 (AS17)
102. Kirill Stupak (BLR), 2573 (E16)
103. Yusnel Bacallao Alonso (CUB), 2573 (AM17)
104. Aleksandr Lenderman (USA), 2565 (AM16)
105. Jóhann Hjartarson (ISL), 2556 (N)
106. Tsegmed Batchuluun (MGL), 2555 (AS17)
107. Vitaly Kunin (GER), 2551 (E17)
108. Helgi Dam Ziska (FRO), 2545 (PN)
109. Yuri Gonzalez Vidal (CUB), 2543 (Z2.3)
110. Leandro Krysa (ARG), 2537 (Z2.5)
111. Amirreza Pourramezanali (IRI), 2533 (Z3.1)
112. Felipe El Debs (BRA), 2531 (Z2.4)
113. Jahongir Vakhidov (UZB), 2529 (Z3.4)
114. Mladen Palac (CRO), 2525 (E16)
115. Bator Sambuev (CAN), 2522 (Z2.2)
116. Nana Dzagnidze (GEO), 2519 (ON)
117. Anton Smirnov, IM (AUS), 2508 (Z3.6)
118. Mohamed Haddouche (ALG), 2487 (Z4.1)
119. Yeoh Li Tian, IM (MAS), 2478 (Z3.3)
120. Essam El-Gindy (EGY), 2455 (Z4.2)
121. Muhammad Khusenkhojaev, IM (TJK), 2455 (Z3.4)
122. Abdullah Al Rakib (BAN), 2454 (Z3.2)
123. Liu Guanchu, IM (CHN), 2451 (Z3.5)
124. Daniel Cawdery, IM (RSA), 2449 (AF)
125. Dai Changren, no title (CHN), 2427 (Z3.5)
126. Kenny Solomon (RSA), 2398 (Z4.3)
127. Joshua Daniel Ruiz Castillo, IM (COL), 2377 (Z2.3)
128. Oluwafemi Balogun, FM (NGR), 2255 (Z4.4)

=== Qualification paths ===
- World Champion (1)
- WC: Semi-finalists of the Chess World Cup 2015 (4)
- J15 and J16: World Junior Champions 2015 and 2016 (2)
- R: Rating (average of all published ratings from February 2016 to January 2017 is used) (19) (Note: The Women's World Champion, Tan Zhongyi, renounced her participation and, in accordance with the regulations, she was replaced from the average rating list.)
- E16 and E17: European Individual Championships 2016 (23) and 2017 (22)
- AM16 and AM17: American Continental Championships 2016 (4) and 2017 (6) (Note: In the 2017 US Zonal, which normally awards five spots for the World Cup, only three players, other than those who already qualified with the previous criteria, attained the required score of 50% or better. In accordance with the World Cup regulations, the two unused positions at the US Zonal Championship passed on to the American Continental Championship.)
- AS16 and AS17: Asian Chess Championships 2016 (5) and 2017 (5)
- AF: African Chess Championship 2017 (2)
- Nordic Chess Championship (N), Z2.1 (3), Z2.2 (1), Z2.3 (2), Z2.4 (2), Z2.5 (2), Z3.1 (1), Z3.2 (1), Z3.3 (2), Z3.4 (2), Z3.5 (2), Z3.6 (1), Z3.7 (1), Z4.1 (1), Z4.2 (1), Z4.3 (1), Z4.4 (1): Zonal tournaments
- ACP: highest-placed participant of the ACP Tour who has not qualified with the previous criteria (1)
- PN: FIDE President nominee (5)
- ON: Organizer nominee (4)

== Results, rounds 1–4 ==
=== Section 1 ===
First round
1	Magnus Carlsen (NOR)	2
128	Oluwafemi Balogun (NGR)	0
64	Aleksey Dreev (RUS)	2
65	Axel Bachmann (PAR)	0
32	Étienne Bacrot (FRA)	2½
97	Alexandr Fier (BRA)	1½
33	Bu Xiangzhi (CHN)	2
96	Diego Flores (ARG)	0
16	Peter Svidler (RUS)	2
113	Jahongir Vakhidov (UZB)	0
49	Bassem Amin (EGY)	2½
80	Viktor Erdős (HUN)	3½
17	Radosław Wojtaszek (POL)	1½
112	Felipe El Debs (BRA)	½
48	Alexander Onischuk (USA)	w/o
81	Yaroslav Zherebukh (USA)	(Note: Zherebukh did not travel to the event because he was concerned that he would not be re-admitted to the USA afterwards. (FIDE World Cup 2017: 35 decisive games, Chessbase, 9/4/2017))

Second Round
1	Magnus Carlsen (NOR)	2
64	Aleksey Dreev (RUS)	0
32	Étienne Bacrot (FRA)	1½
33	Bu Xiangzhi (CHN)	2½
16	Peter Svidler (RUS)	2½
80	Viktor Erdős (HUN)	1½
17	Radosław Wojtaszek (POL)	1½
48	Alexander Onischuk (USA)	2½

Third round
1	Magnus Carlsen (NOR)	½
33	Bu Xiangzhi (CHN)	1½
16	Peter Svidler (RUS)	1½
48	Alexander Onischuk (USA)	½

Fourth round
33	Bu Xiangzhi (CHN)	1
16	Peter Svidler (RUS)	3

=== Section 2 ===
First round
8	Maxime Vachier-Lagrave (FRA)	1½
121	Muhammad Khusenkhojaev (TJK)	½
57	Boris Grachev (RUS)	2½
72	Hrant Melkumyan (ARM)	1½
25	Pavel Eljanov (UKR)	0
104	Aleksandr Lenderman (USA)	2
40	David Howell (ENG)	2½
89	Aryan Tari (NOR)	3½
9	Alexander Grischuk (RUS)	2
120	Essam El-Gindy (EGY)	0
56	Gawain Jones (ENG)	½
73	Jorge Cori (PER)	1½
24	David Navara (CZE)	2
105	Jóhann Hjartarson (ISL)	0
41	Ivan Cheparinov (BUL)	1½
88	Dimitrios Mastrovasilis (GRE)	½

Second Round
8	Maxime Vachier-Lagrave (FRA)	1½
57	Boris Grachev (RUS)	½
104	Aleksandr Lenderman (USA)	1½
89	Aryan Tari (NOR)	½
9	Alexander Grischuk (RUS)	2½
73	Jorge Cori (PER)	1½
24	David Navara (CZE)	3
41	Ivan Cheparinov (BUL)	1

Third round
8	Maxime Vachier-Lagrave (FRA)	2½
104	Aleksandr Lenderman (USA)	1½
9	Alexander Grischuk (RUS)	3½
24	David Navara (CZE)	2½

Fourth round
8	Maxime Vachier-Lagrave (FRA)	3½
9	Alexander Grischuk (RUS)	2½

=== Section 3 ===
First round
4	Vladimir Kramnik (RUS)	1½
125	Dai Changren (CHN)	½
61	Alexander Areshchenko (UKR)	2
68	Anton Demchenko (RUS)	4
29	Vassily Ivanchuk (UKR)	3
100	Murtas Kazhgaleyev (KAZ)	1
36	Jan-Krzysztof Duda (POL)	2
93	Levan Pantsulaia (GEO)	0
13	Anish Giri (NED)	1½
116	Nana Dzagnidze (GEO)	½
52	Alexander Motylev (RUS)	1½
77	Jeffery Xiong (USA)	½
20	Pentala Harikrishna (IND)	3½
109	Yuri González Vidal (CUB)	2½
45	Ruslan Ponomariov (UKR)	½
84	S. P. Sethuraman (IND)	1½

Second Round
4	Vladimir Kramnik (RUS)	1½
68	Anton Demchenko (RUS)	½
29	Vassily Ivanchuk (UKR)	3½
36	Jan-Krzysztof Duda (POL)	2½
13	Anish Giri (NED)	4
52	Alexander Motylev (RUS)	2
20	Pentala Harikrishna (IND)	1½
84	S. P. Sethuraman (IND)	2½

Third round
4	Vladimir Kramnik (RUS)	½
29	Vassily Ivanchuk (UKR)	1½
13	Anish Giri (NED)	4
84	S. P. Sethuraman (IND)	2

Fourth round
29	Vassily Ivanchuk (UKR)	1½
13	Anish Giri (NED)	½

=== Section 4 ===
First round
5	Levon Aronian (ARM)	2
124	Daniel Cawdery (RSA)	0
60	Hou Yifan (CHN)	1½
69	Kacper Piorun (POL)	½
28	Maxim Matlakov (RUS)	1½
101	Julio Sadorra (PHI)	½
37	Dmitry Andreikin (RUS)	3
92	Aleksey Goganov (RUS)	1
12	Sergey Karjakin (RUS)	3
117	Anton Smirnov (AUS)	1
53	Daniil Dubov (RUS)	3½
76	Daniel Fridman (GER)	2½
21	Teimour Radjabov (AZE)	1½
108	Helgi Dam Ziska (FRO)	½
44	Vladislav Artemiev (RUS)	2
85	Benjamin Bok (NED)	0

Second Round
5	Levon Aronian (ARM)	4
60	Hou Yifan (CHN)	2
28	Maxim Matlakov (RUS)	5
37	Dmitry Andreikin (RUS)	3
12	Sergey Karjakin (RUS)	½
53	Daniil Dubov (RUS)	1½
21	Teimour Radjabov (AZE)	3½
44	Vladislav Artemiev (RUS)	4½

Third round
5	Levon Aronian (ARM)	4½
28	Maxim Matlakov (RUS)	3½
53	Daniil Dubov (RUS)	1½
44	Vladislav Artemiev (RUS)	½

Fourth round
5	Levon Aronian (ARM)	1½
53	Daniil Dubov (RUS)	½

=== Section 5 ===
First round
2	Wesley So (USA)	1½
127	Joshua Daniel Ruiz Castillo (COL)	½
63	Sandro Mareco (ARG)	½
66	Matthias Blübaum (GER)	1½
31	Francisco Vallejo Pons (ESP)	2½
98	Karthikeyan Murali (IND)	1½
34	Evgeny Tomashevsky (RUS)	2½
95	Mikhail Antipov (RUS)	1½
15	Ian Nepomniachtchi (RUS)	3½
114	Mladen Palac (CRO)	2½
50	Baskaran Adhiban (IND)	3½
79	Nguyễn Ngọc Trường Sơn (VIE)	2½
18	Yu Yangyi (CHN)	3
111	Amirreza Pourramezanali (IRI)	1
47	Baadur Jobava (GEO)	4½
82	Iván Salgado López (ESP)	3½

Second Round
2	Wesley So (USA)	4
66	Matthias Blübaum (GER)	2
31	Francisco Vallejo Pons (ESP)	1½
34	Evgeny Tomashevsky (RUS)	½
15	Ian Nepomniachtchi (RUS)	2½
50	Baskaran Adhiban (IND)	1½
18	Yu Yangyi (CHN)	2
47	Baadur Jobava (GEO)	4

Third round
2	Wesley So (USA)	1½
31	Francisco Vallejo Pons (ESP)	½
15	Ian Nepomniachtchi (RUS)	1½
47	Baadur Jobava (GEO)	2½

Fourth round
2	Wesley So (USA)	2½
47	Baadur Jobava (GEO)	1½

=== Section 6 ===
First round
7	Hikaru Nakamura (USA)	2
122	Abdullah Al Rakib (BAN)	0
58	David Anton Guijarro (ESP)	½
71	Lázaro Bruzón (CUB)	1½
26	Vladimir Fedoseev (RUS)	3
103	Yusnel Bacallao Alonso (CUB)	1
39	Ernesto Inarkiev (RUS)	1½
90	Mikheil Mchedlishvili (GEO)	½
10	Viswanathan Anand (IND)	1½
119	Yeoh Li Tian (MAS)	½
55	Varuzhan Akobian (USA)	½
74	Anton Kovalyov (CAN)	1½
23	Michael Adams (ENG)	2½
106	Tsegmed Batchuluun (MGL)	1½
42	Maxim Rodshtein (ISR)	2½
87	Robert Hovhannisyan (ARM)	1½

Second Round
7	Hikaru Nakamura (USA)	2½
71	Lázaro Bruzón (CUB)	1½
26	Vladimir Fedoseev (RUS)	1½
39	Ernesto Inarkiev (RUS)	½
10	Viswanathan Anand (IND)	½
74	Anton Kovalyov (CAN)	1½
23	Michael Adams (ENG)	½
42	Maxim Rodshtein (ISR)	1½

Third round
7	Hikaru Nakamura (USA)	½
26	Vladimir Fedoseev (RUS)	1½
74	Anton Kovalyov (CAN)	(Note: Kovalyov forfeited after a dispute over the dress code and alleged racial slurs. See #Dress code controversy.)
42	Maxim Rodshtein (ISR)	w/o

Fourth round
26	Vladimir Fedoseev (RUS)	3
42	Maxim Rodshtein (ISR)	1

=== Section 7 ===
First round
3	Fabiano Caruana (USA)	2
126	Kenny Solomon (RSA)	0
62	Laurent Fressinet (FRA)	2
67	Luka Lenič (SLO)	4
30	Nikita Vitiugov (RUS)	1½
99	Kaido Kulaots (EST)	½
35	Evgeniy Najer (RUS)	1½
94	Aleksej Aleksandrov (BLR)	½
14	Wei Yi (CHN)	2½
115	Bator Sambuev (CAN)	1½
51	Richárd Rapport (HUN)	2
78	Emilio Córdova (PER)	0
19	Li Chao (CHN)	1½
110	Leandro Krysa (ARG)	½
46	Liviu Dieter Nisipeanu (GER)	1½
83	Samuel Sevian (USA)	2½

Second Round
3	Fabiano Caruana (USA)	4
67	Luka Lenič (SLO)	2
30	Nikita Vitiugov (RUS)	1
35	Evgeniy Najer (RUS)	3
14	Wei Yi (CHN)	1½
51	Richárd Rapport (HUN)	2½
19	Li Chao (CHN)	2½
83	Samuel Sevian (USA)	1½

Third round
3	Fabiano Caruana (USA)	1½
35	Evgeniy Najer (RUS)	2½
51	Richárd Rapport (HUN)	2½
19	Li Chao (CHN)	1½

Fourth round
35	Evgeniy Najer (RUS)	1½
51	Richárd Rapport (HUN)	2½

=== Section 8 ===
First round
6	Shakhriyar Mamedyarov (AZE)	1½
123	Liu Guanchu (CHN)	½
59	Yuriy Kuzubov (UKR)	1½
70	Sergei Zhigalko (BLR)	½
27	Boris Gelfand (ISR)	1½
102	Kirill Stupak (BLR)	½
38	Wang Hao (CHN)	1½
91	Deep Sengupta (IND)	½
11	Ding Liren (CHN)	1½
118	Mohamed Haddouche (ALG)	½
54	Martyn Kravtsiv (UKR)	1½
75	Igor Kovalenko (LAT)	½
22	Lê Quang Liêm (VIE)	1½
107	Vitaly Kunin (GER)	½
43	Vidit Santosh Gujrathi (IND)	1½
86	Neuris Delgado Ramírez (PAR)	½

Second Round
6	Shakhriyar Mamedyarov (AZE)	1
59	Yuriy Kuzubov (UKR)	3
27	Boris Gelfand (ISR)	1½
38	Wang Hao (CHN)	2½
11	Ding Liren (CHN)	2½
54	Martyn Kravtsiv (UKR)	1½
22	Lê Quang Liêm (VIE)	½
43	Vidit Santosh Gujrathi (IND)	1½

Third round
59	Yuriy Kuzubov (UKR)	½
38	Wang Hao (CHN)	1½
11	Ding Liren (CHN)	2½
43	Vidit Santosh Gujrathi (IND)	1½

Fourth round
38	Wang Hao (CHN)	½
11	Ding Liren (CHN)	1½

== Results, rounds 5–7 ==
Quarterfinals
16	Peter Svidler (RUS)	1½
8	Maxime Vachier-Lagrave (FRA)	2½
29	Vassily Ivanchuk (UKR)	½
5	Levon Aronian (ARM)	1½
2	Wesley So (USA)	1½
26	Vladimir Fedoseev (RUS)	½
51	Richárd Rapport (HUN)	½
11	Ding Liren (CHN)	1½

Semifinals
8	Maxime Vachier-Lagrave (FRA)	4
5	Levon Aronian (ARM)	5
2	Wesley So (USA)	2½
11	Ding Liren (CHN)	3½

Final (best of 4)
5	Levon Aronian (ARM)	4
11	Ding Liren (CHN)	2

=== Finals ===
Seed	Name	Aug 2017 rating	1	2	3	4	R1	R2	Total
5	Levon Aronian (ARM)	2799	½	½	½	½	1	1	4
11	Ding Liren (CHN)	2777	½	½	½	½	0	0	2

== Dress code controversy ==
Shortly before the third-round game between Anton Kovalyov and Maxim Rodshtein was due to start, Kovalyov was questioned by the arbiter about the knee-length Bermuda shorts he was wearing, the same pair he wore in the first two rounds. Tournament organizer Zurab Azmaiparashvili then approached Kovalyov, stating that his attire violated the FIDE dress code and that he would be punished financially if he did not change what he was wearing. Kovalyov explained that he also wore shorts in the 2015 World Cup without incident, but Azmaiparashvili objected and said that Kovalyov's clothing made him "look like a gypsy." Kovalyov interpreted this as a racial slur. Kovalyov then left the tournament hall and did not return, thus forfeiting the game. He also checked out of his hotel and booked a flight for Dallas, where he was studying for a master's degree in Computer Science technology at the University of Texas. The Chess Federation of Canada (CFC) filed a formal complaint about the incident. ChessBase issued its comprehensive report on the incident on October 1. The ethics commission of FIDE later dismissed the CFC complaint arguing the CFC has no mandate to file it as Kovalyov refused to participate in the hearing and to confirm the CFC acts on his behalf.
