= László Gonda =

Hungarian chess grandmaster (born 1988)

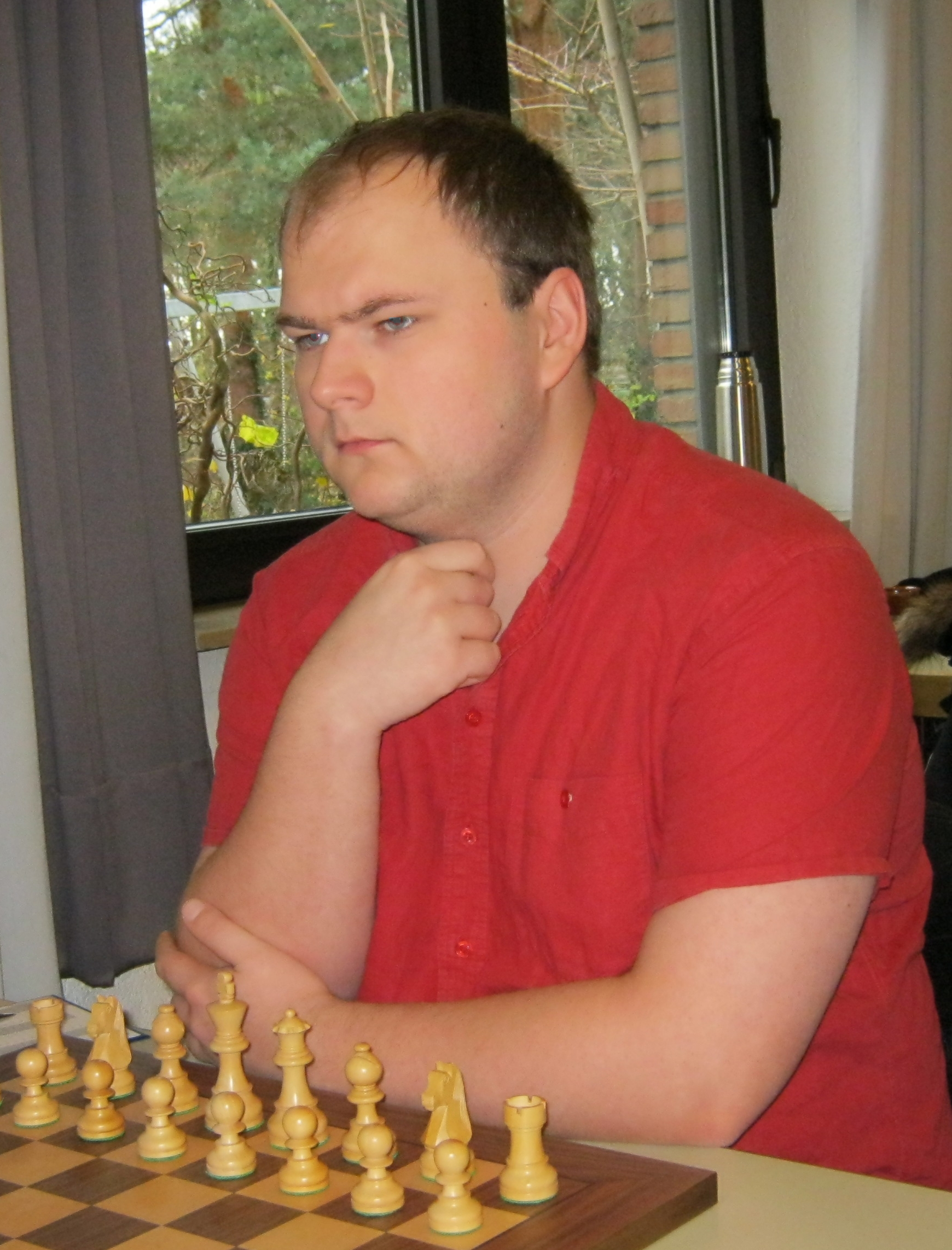

Personal information
- Born: April 24, 1988 (age 38) Tatabánya, Hungary

Chess career
- Country: Hungary
- Title: Grandmaster (2010)
- FIDE rating: 2453 (July 2026)
- Peak rating: 2565 (January 2014)

László Gonda is a Hungarian chess grandmaster.

== Chess career ==
He achieved the Grandmaster title in 2010, earning his norms at the:

- Zalakaros Open A in May 2006
- First Saturday GM in March 2010
- First Saturday GM in April 2010

In April 2012, he was a co-leader of the Norderstedt Open tournament alongside Arturs Neikšāns.

In January 2016, he tied for second place with Vitaly Kunin, Christian Bauer, Gundavaa Bayarsaikhan, and Kiril Georgiev in the Zurich Christmas Open, and was ranked 4th after tiebreaks.

In January 2017, he tied with four other players for 7th place in the Zurich Masters Tournament with a score of 5/7.
