= Krysa =

Krysa is a surname. Notable people with the surname include:

- Leandro Krysa (born 1992), Argentinian chess player
- Oleh Krysa (born 1942), Ukrainian American violinist
