= Saguier =

Saguier is a French surname. Notable people with the surname include:

- Adolfo Saguier (1832-1902), Paraguayan politician
- Emiliano Saguier, Paraguayan chess master
- Jara Saguier - football (soccer) players from Paraguay
- Rubén Bareiro Saguier (1930-2014), Paraguayan writer
