= Cantero =

Cantero is a surname. Notable people with the surname include:

- Castor Cantero (1918–?), former football midfielder from Paraguay
- Edgar Cantero (born 1981), Spanish writer and cartoonist
- Ever Cantero (born 1985), Paraguayan footballer that currently plays for Santiago Morning in Chile
- Federico Cantero Villamil (1874–1946), Spanish civil engineer known for the dams he constructed and planned along the river Duero
- José Cantero (born 1959), Argentine professional golfer who currently plays on both the TPG Tour and the Tour de las Americas
- Juan Pablo Cantero (born 1982), Argentine professional basketball player
- Manuel Cantero, a.k.a. Manu (born 1973), Spanish footballer who plays for Sporting Villanueva Promesas, as a goalkeeper
- Marciano Cantero (born 1960), Argentine singer and musician
- Raoul G. Cantero, III (born 1960), Florida lawyer and a former Justice of the Florida Supreme Court
- Rodrigo Cantero (born 1985), Paraguayan footballer currently playing for General Caballero of the Primera División in Paraguay
- Ronaldo Cantero (dead 2006), Paraguayan chess master
- Sergio Alejandro Ortega Cantero (born 1988), Paraguayan football Midfielder, who plays in Chile for Santiago Morning

== See also ==
- Canterò, the second album by French singer Amaury Vassili, released on 26 November 2010
