= José Cubas =

Paraguayan chess grandmaster (born 1981)

José Fernando Cubas
Personal information
- Born: April 9, 1981 (age 45) Asunción, Paraguay

Chess career
- Country: Paraguay
- Title: Grandmaster (2011)
- Peak rating: 2537 (January 2013)

José Fernando Cubas (born 9 April 1981) is a Paraguayan chess Grandmaster.

== Career ==
Between 1995 and 1996, Cubas represented Paraguay three times at the World Youth Chess Championship in the under-14, under-16, and under-18 categories. In 2001, he won the Paraguayan Chess Championship. He represented Paraguay in four Chess Olympiads between 2000 and 2006, playing on board one in one edition.

In 2001, he placed third at the Zonal tournament in Mar del Plata behind Facundo Pierrot and Rubén Felgaer, and third at the Vince Toth Memorial in Rio de Janeiro behind Martin Crosa and Guillermo Soppe. In 2002, he tied for first place in two round-robin tournaments in Asunción (alongside Jorge Gomez Baillo and Jorge Rosito, respectively). In 2003, he shared second place behind Suat Atalık in Mar del Plata and tied for first place in São Paulo with Gilberto Milos and Wellington Carlos Rocha.

In 2004, he shared first place in Santos and Buenos Aires (with Emilio Córdova) and won another tournament outright in Buenos Aires. In 2005, he won tournaments in Pinamar and Mar del Plata, and tied for first place in Balneário Camboriú (with Martin Crosa) and São Paulo (with Nahuel Diaz). In 2006, he shared second place behind Diego Flores in Mar del Plata. In 2007, he won five round-robin tournaments in Luque, Passos, Colonia del Sacramento, Necochea, and São Paulo, and finished second behind Rubén Felgaer in Rio de Janeiro.

In 2008, he won two tournaments in Buenos Aires—including the Maksim Sorokin Memorial—and tied for first place in Villa Martelli with Sebastian Iermito. In 2011, he won a tournament in Rio de Janeiro and was awarded the Grandmaster (GM) title by FIDE.

He reached his peak FIDE rating of 2537 in January 2013.
