= Recalde =

Recalde is a surname. Notable people with the surname include:

- Andrés Recalde, Uruguayan boxer
- Carlos Recalde, Paraguayan footballer
- Eleuterio Recalde, Paraguayan chess master
- Federico Recalde, Argentine footballer
- Germán Ezequiel Cano Recalde, Argentine footballer
- Héctor Recalde, Argentine politician
- Jorge Recalde, Paraguayan footballer
- Jorge Recalde, Argentine rally driver
- Juan Martínez de Recalde, Spanish admiral
- Luciano Recalde, Argentine footballer
- Mariano Recalde, Argentine politician

== See also ==
- Errekalde
