= Federico Perez Ponsa =

Argentine chess grandmaster (born 1993)

Personal information
- Born: 22 October 1993 (age 33) Buenos Aires, Argentina

Chess career
- Country: Argentina
- Title: Grandmaster (2011)
- FIDE rating: 2546 (November 2026)
- Peak rating: 2594 (October 2017)

Federico Perez Ponsa (born 22 October 1993 in Buenos Aires) is an Argentine chess player who received the FIDE title of Grandmaster (GM) in 2011.

== Chess career ==
In July 2007, he became the U14 Pan American Champion in Medellín, Colombia, achieving the title of FIDE Master.

In March 2009, he got his last International Master norm, in the ITT Sub 20 Projection, held at GEBA. In May of the same year, he qualified for the first time in the Superior Argentine Championship (84th), played in La Plata, at the age of 15. In May 2011, he became the U20 South American Champion in Tarija, Bolivia.

Perez Ponsa became a Grandmaster in 2011, at the Grafica Yael tournament, at the age of 17.

In July 2014, at the 89th Argentine Superior Championship, he tied for first place and lost the tiebreaks against Rubén Felgaer. In December, he got 1st place with in the San Luis International Open.

In May 2015, he qualified in the Continental of the Americas and played in the Chess World Cup in September 2015. He tied 1–1 against GM Leinier Domínguez and was eliminated in the tiebreaks. In November, he won the II Magistral Aloas organized at the Palacio de las Aguas Corrientes. In August 2016, he won the Magistral Copa Mercosur at Villa Martelli.

In September 2017, he became the Metropolitan Champion at Club Torre Blanca. In October of that year, he is Superior Argentine Runner-up, in the 92nd Argentine Championship held in Morón.

In April 2018, he won the Legislatura Cup played in the Buenos Aires Legislature. In November, he got 1st place in the 25th Pro-AM Clarín Cup Open at Villa Martelli

On the February 1, 2019 list, he enters the FIDE Top 100 in both Blitz (2,646) and Rapid (2,655). In August 2019, he got 1st place in the Mercosur Master Cup, at Villa Martelli.

In May 2021, he qualified in the Hybrid Continental of the Americas and participated for the second time in the Chess World Cup in July 2021. This time, he tied 1–1 in the first round against GM Momchil Nikolov beating him on tiebreaks. In the second round, he lost 1.5-0.5 to GM Alexander Grischuk. In November 2021, he won the 28th Open Pro-AM Copa Clarín at Villa Martelli.

In June 2022, in the 96th Argentine Championship held at the Club Argentino de Ajedrez, he tied for first place and became Superior Argentine Champion, beating GM Leonardo Tristán and Ariel Sorín in a triangular tiebreaker.

In October 2022, he played in the XII South American Games Asuncion 2022 and won 3 medals. In the individual competitions, he won the bronze medal in Rapids. In the mixed competitions, he won a silver medal in Blitz and a gold medal in Rapid together with Claudia Amura.

In September 2023, he won the II Abierto Circuito Minero in Catamarca.

In October 2023, at the 98th Argentine Championship, he tied for first place and lost the tiebreak against Fernando Peralta.

In June 2024, he won the Masters Ciudad de Buenos Aires, defeating Norwegian GM Aryan Tari in the final round.

In October 2024, he tied for first place at the 31st ProAm Open, finishing third on tiebreaks.

In June 2025, he won the Open Ciudad de Buenos Aires.

In November 2025, he tied for first place at the 32nd ProAm Open, finishing third on tiebreaks. In December of the same year, at the 100th Argentine Championship, he was crowned Argentine Vice Champion.

=== Olympiads ===
He represented Argentina in four Chess Olympiads

N°	Ed.	Año	Sede	Resultados	Puntos
1	41°	2014	Tromsø, Norway	+2 =3 -2	3/6
2	42°	2016	Baku, Azerbaijan	+4 =3 -2	5.5/9
3	43°	2018	Batumi, Georgia	+1 =3 -2	2.5/6
4	44°	2022	Chennai, India	+2 =4 -2	4/8

=== Argentine Championships ===
N°	Ed.	Año	Sede	Puesto	Puntos
1	84°	2009	La Plata	11°	4.5/11
2	86°	2011	La Plata	3°	8/11
3	87°	2012	Villa Martelli	14°	6.5/11
4	88°	2013	Chaco	4°	7.5/13
5	89°	2014	Chaco	2°	9.5/13
6	91°	2016	Villa Martelli	5°	8/13
7	92°	2017	Ramos Mejía	2°	8/13
8	93°	2018	Villa Martelli	3°	8.5/13
9	95°	2020	Villa Martelli	4°	6.5/11
10	96°	2021	Buenos Aires	1°	8.5/11
11	97°	2022	Bariloche	7°	5.5/11
12	98°	2023	Buenos Aires	2°	8/11
13	99°	2024	Buenos Aires	6°	6/11
14	100°	2025	Buenos Aires	2°	7.5/11

== Awards ==
Premio Revelación Clarín (2009)

Premio Podio al Mejor Deportista de Zárate (2009 y 2011)

Premio Olimpia de Plata (2011)

Premio Jorge Newbery (2015).

In 2020 he was recognized with the Konex Award - Diploma of Merit as one of the 5 best Argentine chess players of the last decade.
