= Paraguayan Chess Championship =

The Paraguayan Chess Championship is the national chess championship of Paraguay. It was inaugurated by The Paraguayan Chess Circle, founded in 1938 as Paraguay's first club devoted exclusively to chess. The Paraguayan Chess Circle continued to run the event at least until 1970 as Paraguay did not yet have a national chess federation, although it was affiliated with FIDE and had competed in Chess Olympiads at irregular intervals starting at Buenos Aires 1939.

== Winners ==
Year	Winner
1938	Juan Silvano Diaz Perez
1939	Juan Silvano Diaz Perez
1940	Ernesto Espinola
1941	Ernesto Espinola
1942	Juan Silvano Diaz Perez
1943	Ernesto Stadecker
1944	Ernesto Stadecker
1945	Ernesto Stadecker
1946	Luis Oscar Boettner
1947	Luis Oscar Boettner
1948	Carlos Almeida
1949	Carlos Almeida
1950	Carlos Almeida
1951	Carlos Almeida
1952	Faustino Paniagua
1953	Eduardo Salomon
1954	Ronaldo Cantero
1955	Ronaldo Cantero
1956	Ronaldo Cantero
1957	Ronaldo Cantero
1958	Ronaldo Cantero
1959	Benigno Rivarola
1960	Eleuterio Recalde
1961	Ronaldo Cantero
1962	Ronaldo Cantero
1963	Victorio Riego Prieto
1964	Raul Silva
1965	Ronaldo Cantero
1966	Omar Villagra
1967	Emiliano Saguier
1968	Emiliano Saguier
1969	Emiliano Saguier
1970	Julio César Ingolotti
1971	Carlos Gamarra Cáceres
1972	Victorio Riego Prieto
1973	Óscar Ferreira
1974	Óscar Ferreira
1975	Carlos Gamarra Cáceres
1976	Zenon Franco
1977	Victorio Riego Prieto
1978	Óscar Ferreira
1979	Carlos Gamarra Cáceres
1980	Óscar Ferreira
1981	Cristobal Valiente
1982	Cristobal Valiente
1983	Luis Carlos Patriarca
1984	Francisco Santacruz
1985	Cristobal Valiente
1986	Francisco Santacruz
1987	Francisco Santacruz
1988	Francisco Santacruz
1989	Cristobal Valiente
1990	Francisco Santacruz
1991	Cristobal Valiente
1992	Cristobal Valiente
1993	Carlos Gamarra Cáceres
1994	Cesar Santacruz
1995	Eduardo Peralta
1996	Ricardo Kropff
1997	Cristobal Valiente
1998	Luis Carlos Patriarca
1999	Eduardo Peralta
2000	Eduardo Peralta
2001	Jose Cubas
2002	Enrique Butti
2003	Luis Carlos Patriarca
2004	Axel Bachmann
2005	Luis Carlos Patriarca
2006	Luis Carlos Patriarca
2007	Luis Carlos Patriarca
2008	Luis Carlos Patriarca
2009	Rodrigo del Puerto
2010	Guillermo Vázquez
2011	Guillermo Vázquez
2012	Manuel Latorre
2013	Axel Bachmann
2014	Neuris Delgado Ramírez
2015	Neuris Delgado Ramírez
2016	Axel Bachmann
2017	Axel Bachmann
2018	Neuris Delgado Ramírez
2019	Neuris Delgado Ramírez
