= Daniel Fernandez (American chess player) =

American chess grandmaster (born 1985)

Personal information
- Born: May 9, 1985 (age 41) Lima, Peru

Chess career
- Country: United States
- Title: Grandmaster (2022)
- FIDE rating: 2416 (July 2026)
- Peak rating: 2498 (August 2017)

Daniel Fernandez (born May 9, 1985) is an American chess grandmaster.

== Early life ==
Fernandez was born in Peru in 1985. His family moved to Fort Lauderdale in 1986.

== Chess career ==
Fernandez began learning chess at age 6, and began competing in chess tournaments in the following year. He was coached by Larry Kaufman, and surpassed his older brother David, who was also competing in scholastic events. Kaufman stated that Fernandez was one of his students who earned the International Master title.

At age 11, Fernandez was the youngest National Master in the United States. He began coaching students in Houston after becoming the youngest winner of the Florida State Championship at age 16. In 2009, he became the Texas State Champion. In January 2022, his Grandmaster title was finalized.

Fernandez was a member of the University of Texas at Dallas's chess team, where he studied economics and finance, and later of the University of Texas at Brownsville's chess team. In 2008, he suggested for program director Russell Harwood to give Axel Bachmann (then an International Master) a scholarship and a move to the United States.
