= Guillermo Vázquez (chess player) =

Paraguayan chess grandmaster (born 1997)

Personal information
- Born: March 16, 1997 (age 29) Asunción, Paraguay

Chess career
- Country: Paraguay
- Title: Grandmaster (2022)
- FIDE rating: 2530 (November 2026)
- Peak rating: 2575 (November 2022)

Guillermo Vázquez Colman (born in Asuncion, 1997) is a Paraguayan chess player, who was awarded the title of International Master by FIDE in 2015 and the title of Grandmaster in 2022.

He won the Paraguayan Chess Championship in 2010 and 2011, and hold the record of the youngest player ever to win the National Chess Tournament with 13 years old.

He was part of the UTRGV (University of Texas Rio Grande Valley) that won the President's Cup (Final Four of Collegiate Chess) in 2019 and was part of the UTD (University of Texas Dallas) team that finished fourth in the Kasparov Chess Foundation University Cup.

He has also represented Paraguay in the Chess Olympiad, including the 39th Chess Olympiad, where he finished on 4/10 on board 4, 40th Chess Olympiad (5.5/9 on board 4), 41st Chess Olympiad (6/9 on board 4), and the 43rd Chess Olympiad (6.5/11 on board 2).

Vazquez won the Floripa Chess Open in 2020, just before the COVID-19 pandemic, and reached his first GM Norm

He qualified to play in the Chess World Cup 2021. He won in the first round against grandmaster Nikita Meshkovs. In the second round, he lost against the eventual winner Jan-Krzysztof Duda.
