= Oswaldo Zambrana =

Bolivian chess grandmaster (born 1981)

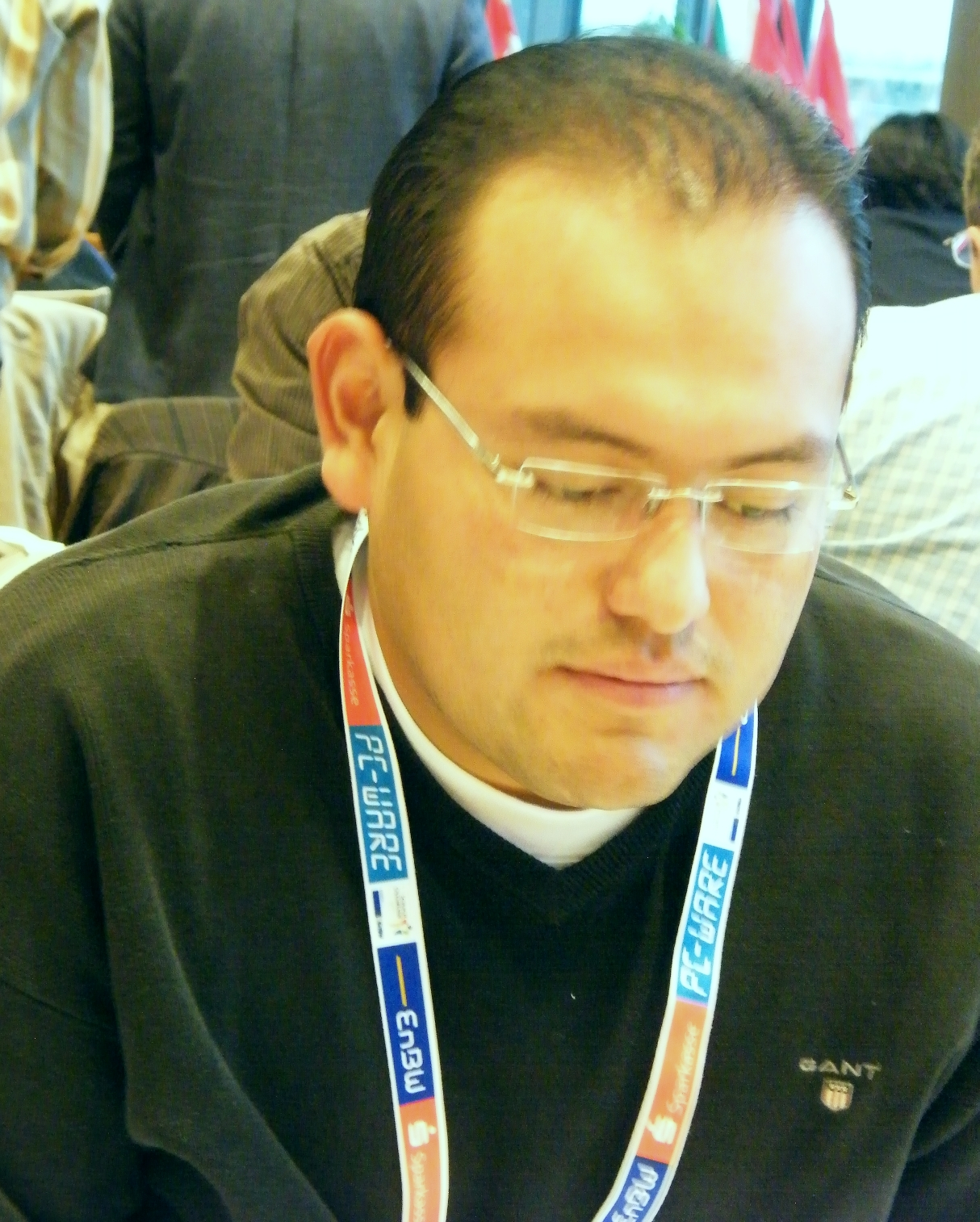
- 38th Chess Olympiad in Dresden, 2008

Personal information
- Born: July 7, 1981 (age 45) Sucre, Bolivia

Chess career
- Country: Bolivia
- Title: Grandmaster (2007)
- Peak rating: 2515 (July 2010)

Osvaldo Ronald Zambrana Enríquez (born 7 July 1981) is a Bolivian chess player. He was awarded the title Grandmaster by FIDE in 2007 and he is the only Bolivian to achieve so.

Zambrana Enríquez has won the Bolivian Chess Championship five times between 2002 and 2014. In team competitions, he has represented Bolivia in the Chess Olympiad (1998, 2000, 2002, 2004, 2006, 2008, 2012, 2014), the World Youth U26 Team Chess Championship and the Mercosur Chess Olympiad. He won the individual silver medal on board 3 in the 2000 Chess Olympiad at Istanbul.

== Notable Tournaments ==
 I Torneo Iberoamericano (Grupo-A) (2004)
 Copa ENTEL (2004)
 Antonio Rocha Memorial (2011)
 Euwe Stimulans (2008)
 II Copa ENTEL (2005)
 Istanbul Olympiad (2012)
 Turin Olympiad (2006)
 Torneo Continental Americano (2003)
 American Continental Championship (2005)
 Calvia Olympiad (2004)
 Dresden Olympiad (2008)
 FIDE Online Olympiad (2020)
 Tromso Olympiad (2014)
