= Muhammad Khusenkhojaev =

Tajikistani chess player (born 1987)

Personal information
- Born: June 2, 1987 (age 39)

Chess career
- Country: Tajikistan
- Title: International Master (2013)
- Peak rating: 2466 (October 2017)

Muhammad Khusenkhojaev (born 2 June 1987) is a Tajikistani chess International Master.

== Chess career ==
He has represented his country in a number of chess olympiads, including 2006, 2012, 2014, 2016 and 2018.

He played in the Chess World Cup 2017, in which he was defeated by Maxime Vachier-Lagrave in the first round.
