= Nikita Meshkovs =

Latvian chess grandmaster (born 1994)

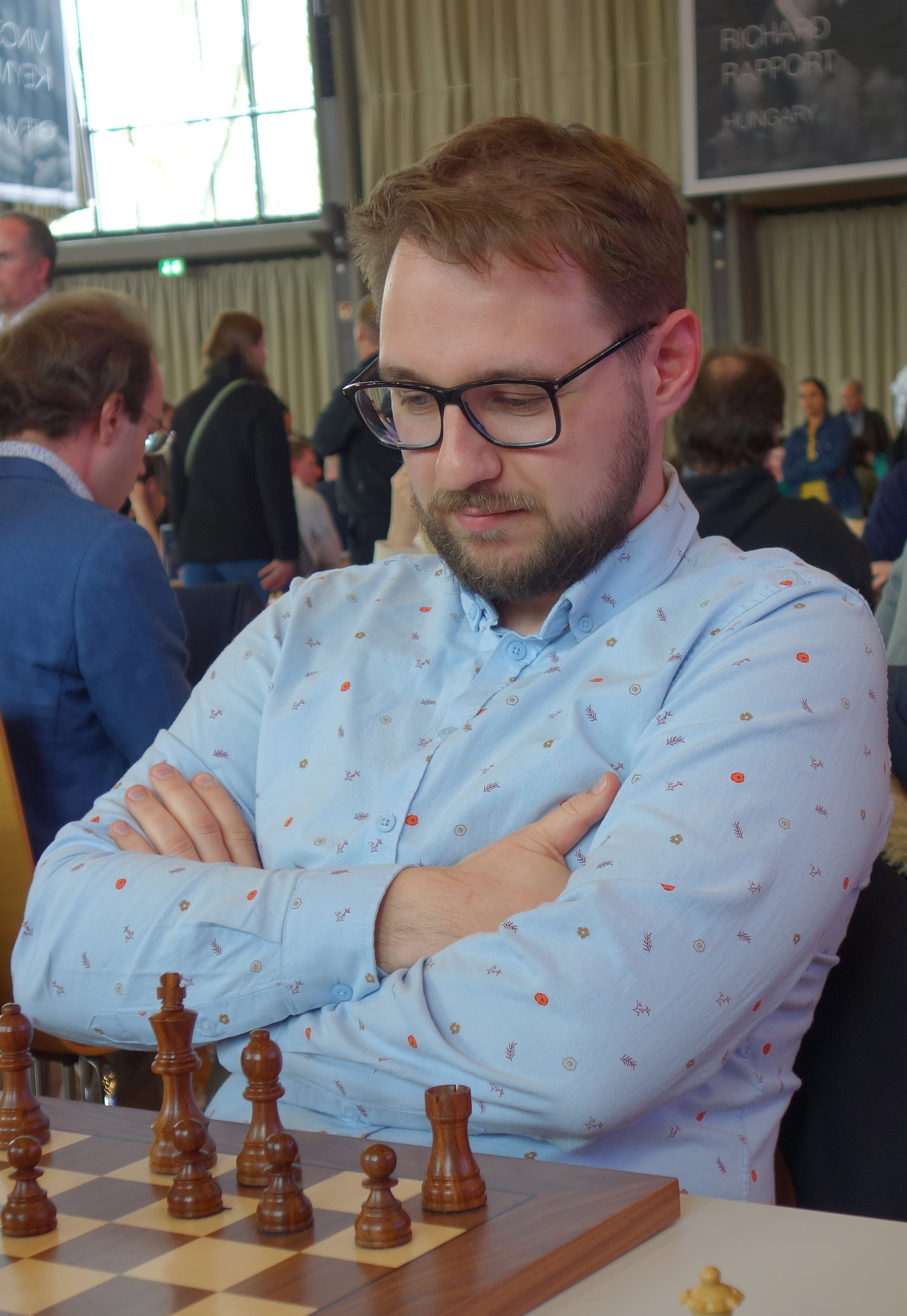
- Meshkovs in 2024

Personal information
- Born: 30 June 1994 (age 32) Riga, Latvia

Chess career
- Country: Latvia
- Title: Grandmaster (2017)
- FIDE rating: 2545 (July 2026)
- Peak rating: 2586 (March 2023)

Nikita Evgenievich Meshkovs (Latvian: Ņikita Meškovs, Russian: Никита Евгеньевич Мешков; born 30 June 1994) is a Latvian chess grandmaster (2017). He won the Latvian Chess Championship in 2018.

== Biography ==
Meshkovs started playing chess at the age of four. At the age of six, he became a student at the Riga Chess School. His first coach was Leonīds Borisovs. He won six Latvian Junior Chess Championships in different age groups, and regularly participated in the European Youth and World Youth Chess Championships in different age groups. In 2008, in Mureck he won the European Union U14 chess championship. Since 2011, he has regularly participated in the Latvian Chess Championships, placing third in 2015, second in 2016, and winning the competition in 2018. In June 2018, in Palanga he won Baltic Zonal Tournament second stage. In 2019, he won the A-Group Northwest Cup Final on tie-break from Vadim Moiseenko. In 2020, he won the Panevezys International Chess Festival.

In July 2021, in Sochi he participated in Chess World Cup 2021 and lost in 1st round to Paraguayan grandmaster Guillermo Vázquez.

In October 2022, he drew against world champion Magnus Carlsen in the first round of the European Chess Club Cup, which was Carlsen's first classical match after the Carlsen-Niemann controversy.

Nikita Meshkovs played for Latvia:

- in Chess Olympiads (2016, 2018, 2024);
- in 2013 Summer Universiade chess tournament.

In 2014, he was awarded the FIDE International Master (IM) title and received the FIDE International Grandmaster (GM) title three years later.
