= Dai Changren =

Chinese chess grandmaster (born 1999)

Personal information
- Born: January 10, 1999 (age 27) Tianjin, China

Chess career
- Country: China
- Title: Grandmaster (2023)
- FIDE rating: 2510 (July 2026)
- Peak rating: 2561 (February 2026)

Dai Changren (Chinese: 戴常人, born 1999) is a Chinese chess grandmaster.

== Chess career ==
He played in the Chess World Cup 2017, being defeated by former world champion Vladimir Kramnik in the first round.
