= Ernesto Espinola =

Paraguayan chess player

Personal information
- Born: unknown
- Died: unknown

Chess career
- Country: Paraguay

Ernesto Espinola (unknown – unknown), was a Paraguayan chess player, two times Paraguayan Chess Championship winner (1940, 1941).

== Biography ==
From the late 1930s to the mid-1940s, Ernesto Espinola was one of Paraguay's leading chess players He twice in row won Paraguayan Chess Championships in 1940 and 1941.

Ernesto Espinola played for Paraguay in the Chess Olympiad:

- In 1939, at second board in the 8th Chess Olympiad in Buenos Aires (+0, =3, -11).
