= Yusnel Bacallao Alonso =

Cuban chess grandmaster (born 1988)

Personal information
- Born: 21 June 1988 (age 38) Matanzas, Cuba

Chess career
- Country: Cuba
- Title: Grandmaster (2012)
- FIDE rating: 2572 (July 2026)
- Peak rating: 2605 (January 2018)

Yusnel Bacallao Alonso (born 21 June 1988) is a Cuban chess player who received the FIDE title of Grandmaster (GM) in September 2012.

== Chess career ==
He played in the Chess World Cup 2017, where he was defeated in the first round by Vladimir Fedoseev.

Alonso is ranked 2nd best chess player in Cuba. (May 2020)
