= Luis Oscar Boettner =

Paraguayan chess player

Personal information
- Born: unknown
- Died: unknown

Chess career
- Country: Paraguay

Luis Oscar Boettner (1900 – 1972), was a Paraguayan chess player, two times Paraguayan Chess Championship winner (1946, 1947).

== Biography ==
From the late 1930s to the end 1940s, Luis Oscar Boettner was one of Paraguay's leading chess players. He twice in row won Paraguayan Chess Championships in 1946 and 1947.

Luis Oscar Boettner played for Paraguay in the Chess Olympiad:

- In 1939, at fourth board in the 8th Chess Olympiad in Buenos Aires (+3, =5, -8).

Paraguayan Ambassador to the U.S. and to the O.A.S. from 1949 to 1954 and to the Vatican from 1954 to 1956

Member of the House of Representatives from 1956 to 1959
