= Oluwafemi Balogun =

Nigerian chess player (born 1987)

Personal information
- Born: 1987 (age 38–39) Owerri, Nigeria

Chess career
- Country: Nigeria
- Title: International Master (2017)
- Peak rating: 2308 (January 2022)

Oluwafemi Daniel Balogun (born 1987) is a Nigerian chess player.

== Chess career ==
In 2016, Balogun won the Africa Zone 4.4 Individual Championship, and as a result he was awarded the title FIDE Master. The following year, Balogun won this event for the second time and qualified to play in the Chess World Cup, held later in the same year in Batumi, Georgia. He was also granted the title International Master for this victory.

In the Chess World Cup 2017, Balogun was defeated by World Champion Magnus Carlsen in the first round, becoming the first African to play against a reigning world champion in a competitive match. In 2021 he won the Nigerian chess championships. In the Chess World Cup 2023, he was defeated by Alexandr Predke in the first round.
