= Óscar Ferreira =

Paraguayan chess player (born 1951)

Personal information
- Born: 22 March 1951 (age 75)

Chess career
- Country: Paraguay
- Title: FIDE Master (1993)
- Peak rating: 2300 (January 1993)

Óscar Ferreira (born 22 March 1951), is a Paraguayan chess FIDE Master (FM), four-times Paraguayan Chess Championship winner (1973, 1974, 1978, 1980).

== Biography ==
From the mid of 1970s to the mid-2000s Óscar Ferreira was one of Paraguay's leading chess players. He four times won Paraguayan Chess Championships: 1973, 1974, 1978, and 1980. Also he won silver medal in this tournament in 2001. Óscar Ferreira was participant of a number of international chess tournaments held in Latin America.

Óscar Ferreira played for Paraguay in the Chess Olympiads:

- In 1976, at fourth board in the 22nd Chess Olympiad in Haifa (+5, =2, -5),
- In 1980, at second board in the 24th Chess Olympiad in La Valletta (+6, =4, -4),
- In 2000, at fourth board in the 34th Chess Olympiad in Istanbul (+3, =1, -5),
- In 2004, at first reserve board in the 36th Chess Olympiad in Calvià (+2, =6, -2).

Óscar Ferreira played for Paraguay in the Pan American Team Chess Championship:

- In 1971, at third board in the 1st Panamerican Team Chess Championship in Tucuman (+3, =1, -3).
