= Victorio Riego Prieto =

Paraguayan chess player (1932–2009)

Personal information
- Born: 1 February 1932
- Died: 12 June 2009 (aged 77)

Chess career
- Country: Paraguay

Victorio Manuel Riego Prieto (1 February 1932 – 12 June 2009), was a Paraguayan chess player, three-times Paraguayan Chess Championship winner (1963, 1972, 1977).

== Biography ==
From the begin of 1960s to the mid-1990s Victorio Riego Prieto was one of Paraguay's leading chess players. He three times won Paraguayan Chess Championships: 1963, 1972, and 1977. In 1969, in Mar del Plata Victorio Riego Prieto participated in World Chess Championship South American Zonal tournament and shared 14th–15th place.

Victorio Riego Prieto played for Paraguay in the Chess Olympiads:

- In 1968, at third board in the 18th Chess Olympiad in Lugano (+10, =2 -3),
- In 1978, at third board in the 23rd Chess Olympiad in Buenos Aires (+2, =4, -3),
- In 1986, at fourth board in the 27th Chess Olympiad in Dubai (+4, =2, -4),
- In 1988, at first reserve board in the 28th Chess Olympiad in Thessaloniki (+3, =1, -4),
- In 1994, at fourth board in the 31st Chess Olympiad in Moscow (+3, =1, -7),
- In 1996, at second reserve board in the 32nd Chess Olympiad in Yerevan (+3, =1, -3).

Victorio Riego Prieto played for Paraguay in the Pan American Team Chess Championships:

- In 1971, at second board in the 1st Panamerican Team Chess Championship in Tucuman (+0, =5, -2),
- In 1987, at first reserve board in the 3rd Panamerican Team Chess Championship in Junín (+3, =0, -2),
- In 1995, at first reserve board in the 5th Panamerican Team Chess Championship in Cascavel (+1, =0, -3).
