= Carlos Gamarra Cáceres =

Paraguayan chess player (1948–2005)

Personal information
- Born: 17 February 1948
- Died: 16 December 2005 (aged 57)

Chess career
- Country: Paraguay
- Title: FIDE Master (1989)
- Peak rating: 2345 (January 1994)

Ruben Carlos Gamarra Cáceres (17 February 1948 – 16 December 2005), was a Paraguayan chess FIDE Master (FM), four-times Paraguayan Chess Championship winner (1971, 1975, 1979, 1993).

== Biography ==
From the begin of 1970s to the mid-1990s Carlos Gamarra Cáceres was one of Paraguay's leading chess players. He four times won Paraguayan Chess Championships: 1971, 1975, 1979, and 1993. Carlos Gamarra Cáceres five times participated in World Chess Championship South American Zonal tournaments: 1972, 1975, 1985, 1989, and 2003. Also he participated in Pan American Chess Championship in 1977.

Carlos Gamarra Cáceres played for Paraguay in the Chess Olympiads:

- In 1976, at second board in the 22nd Chess Olympiad in Haifa (+5, =2, -5),
- In 1978, at second board in the 23rd Chess Olympiad in Buenos Aires (+2, =3, -5),
- In 1980, at first board in the 24th Chess Olympiad in La Valletta (+5, =2, -7),
- In 1982, at second board in the 25th Chess Olympiad in Lucerne (+2, =4, -6),
- In 1984, at third board in the 26th Chess Olympiad in Thessaloniki (+3, =3, -6),
- In 1986, at second reserve board in the 27th Chess Olympiad in Dubai (+3, =2, -3),
- In 1988, at fourth board in the 28th Chess Olympiad in Thessaloniki (+5, =2, -4).

Carlos Gamarra Cáceres played for Paraguay in the Pan American Team Chess Championships:

- In 1985, at fourth board in the 2nd Panamerican Team Chess Championship in Villa Gesell (+0, =0, -3),
- In 1987, at third board in the 3rd Panamerican Team Chess Championship in Junín (+0, =6, -3),
- In 1991, at third board in the 4th Panamerican Team Chess Championship in Guarapuava (+1, =1, -4).

In 2010, the Carlos Gamarra Cáceres memorial was held in Asunción.
