= Bolivian Chess Championship =

Annual chess tournament

The Bolivian Chess Championship is organized by the Bolivian Chess Federation (Spanish: Federación Boliviana de Ajedrez).

== Winners since 2000 ==
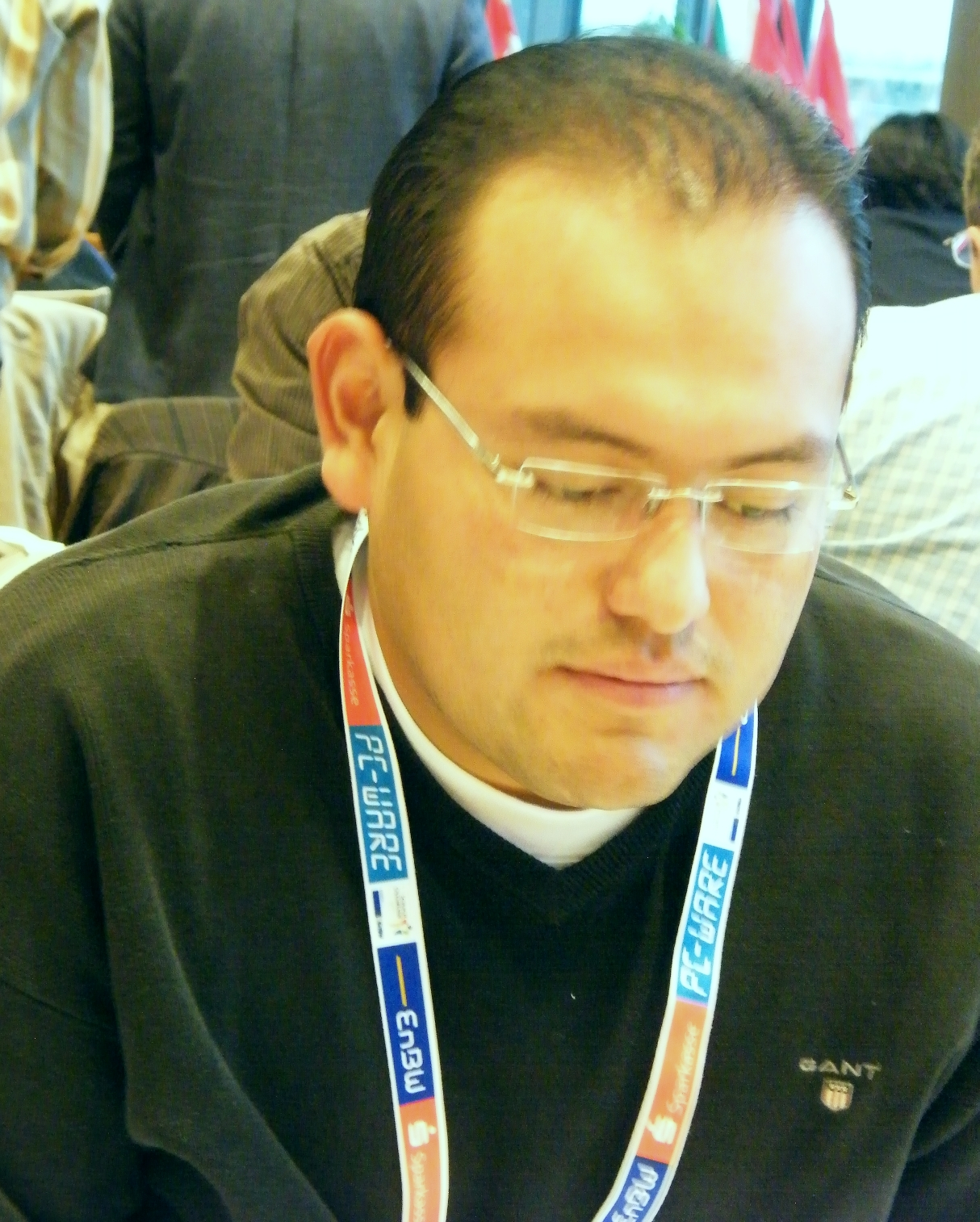
Grandmaster Oswaldo Zambrana, five-time Bolivian chess champion

Year	Champion	Woman Champion
2000	Jonny Cueto	
2001	Jonny Cueto	
2002	Oswaldo Zambrana	
2003	Oswaldo Zambrana	
2004	Alfredo Cruz	
2005	Jorge Berrocal (Note: Three foreign players took part in the 2005 tournament but were ineligible for the national championship title. Berrocal finished with the same score as Argentinian International Master Cristian Dolezal, who finished in first place on tiebreaks.)	
2006	Oswaldo Zambrana	
2007	Ronald Campero	
2008	Raisa Luna	
2009	Ronald Campero	
2010	Boris Ferrufino	
2011	Oswaldo Zambrana	
2012	Jose Daniel Gemy	
2013	Jose Daniel Gemy	
2014	Oswaldo Zambrana	
2015	Jose Daniel Gemy	Suely Bastos
2016	Jose Daniel Gemy	
2017	Jose Daniel Gemy	
2018		
2019		
2020	Jose Daniel Gemy	Jessica Molina
