= Felipe El Debs =

Brazilian chess grandmaster (born 1985)

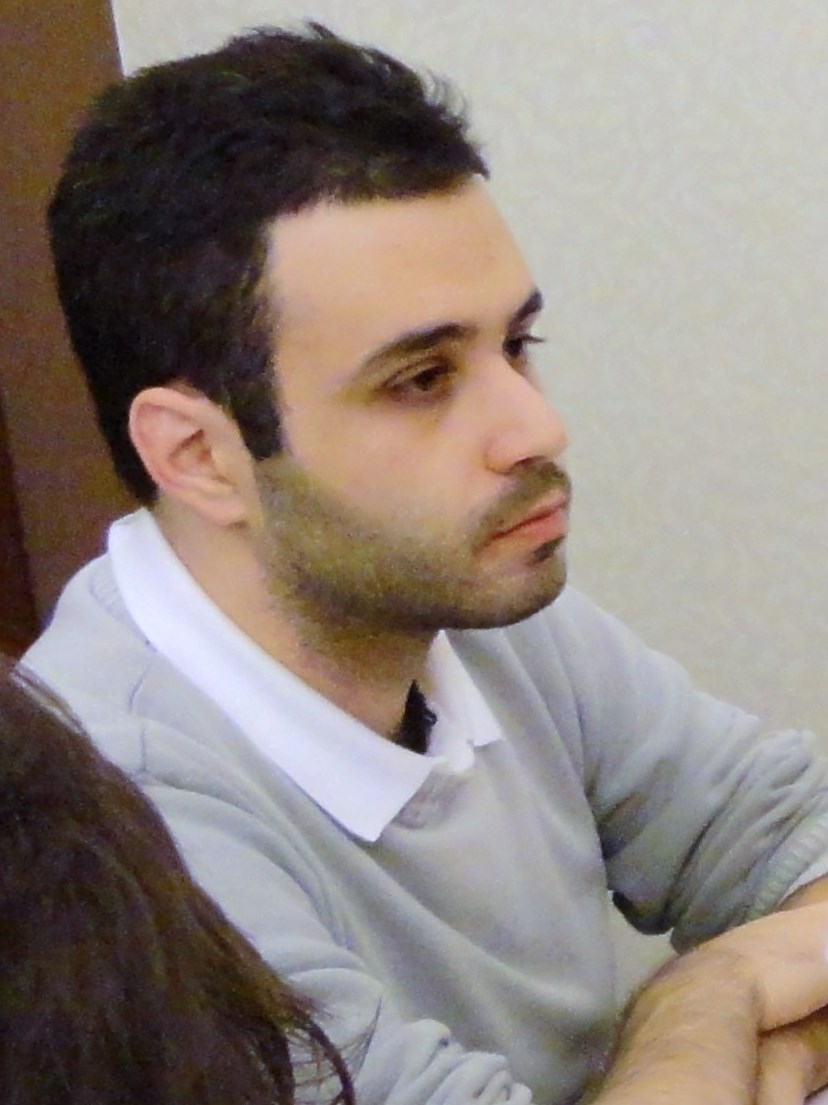
- El Debs at the 2014 Basel Chess Festival

Personal information
- Born: Felipe de Cresce El Debs; 29 January 1985 (age 41) São Carlos, Brazil

Chess career
- Country: Brazil
- Title: Grandmaster (2010)
- FIDE rating: 2532 (July 2026)
- Peak rating: 2553 (February 2020)

Felipe de Cresce El Debs (born 29 January 1985) is a Brazilian chess player who holds the FIDE title of Grandmaster. He competed in the FIDE World Cup in 2017. El Debs played for the Brazilian team in the Chess Olympiad and Pan American Team Chess Championship. In this latter event, in 2013, his team finished third. In 2004 he won the Brazilian under-20 championship with a score of 100%.
