= Liu Guanchu =

Chinese chess player (born 1994)

Liu Guanchu 刘冠初
Personal information
- Born: June 11, 1994 (age 32) Nanjing, China

Chess career
- Country: China
- Title: International Master (2014)
- FIDE rating: 2413 (July 2026)
- Peak rating: 2466 (April 2019)

Liu Guanchu (Chinese: 刘冠初) is a Chinese chess International Master.

== Chess career ==
He played in the Chess World Cup 2017, being defeated by Shakhriyar Mamedyarov in the first round.
