= Juan Silvano Diaz Perez =

Paraguayan chess player

Personal information
- Born: 1914
- Died: 1969 (aged 54–55)

Chess career
- Country: Paraguay

Juan Silvano Diaz Perez (1914 – 1969), was a Paraguayan chess player, three times Paraguayan Chess Championship winner (1938, 1939, 1942).

== Biography ==
Juan Silvano Diaz Perez was poet, teacher, essayist and literary critic. Although a lawyer by profession, from a very young age he devoted himself to literature and chess. From the late 1930s to the mid-1940s, Juan Silvano Diaz Perez was one of Paraguay's leading chess players. He won first official Paraguayan Chess Championship in 1938, and repeated this success in 1939 and 1942. A professor of literature in the 1940s, he also lived in exile for many years. Essayist and scholar of the Generación (Española) del 98, he had the honor of prefacing the first edition of Ceniza Redimida (1950) by the great poet Hérib Campos Cervera. Several of his poems have appeared in anthologies by Buzó Gómez (1943), Luis María Martínez (1986). His famous essay was "Julio Correa, the poet of the revolution" (Buenos Aires, 1943), a series of several essays about Paraguayan and Spanish writers who have recently been brought together by his brother Rodrigo Díaz-Pérez and published in a posthumous volume Ensayos, Poemas y Ajedrez (1996).

Juan Silvano Diaz Perez played for Paraguay in the Chess Olympiad:

- In 1939, at first board in the 8th Chess Olympiad in Buenos Aires (+3, =1, -11).
