= Jorge Cori =

Peruvian chess grandmaster (born 1995)

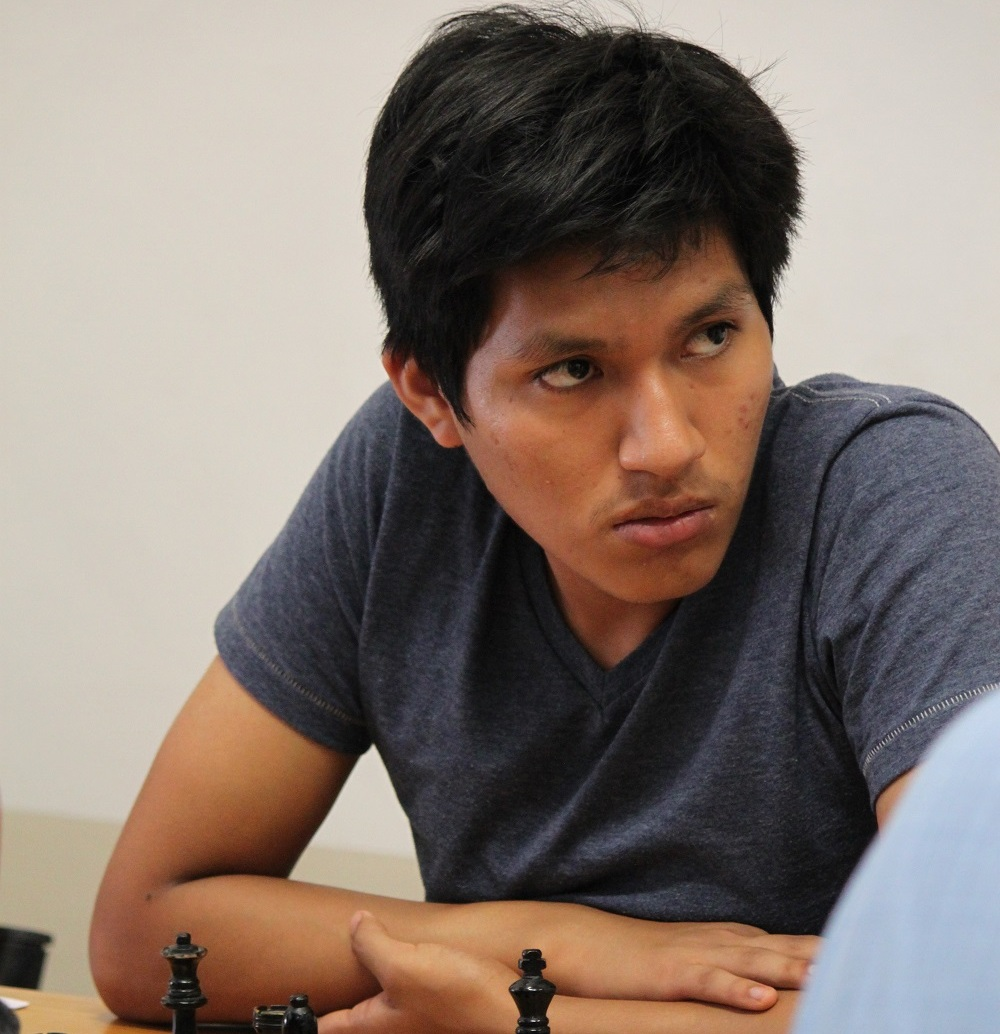
- Cori in 2016

Personal information
- Born: Jorge Moisés Cori Tello; 30 July 1995 (age 31) Lima, Peru

Chess career
- Country: Peru
- Title: Grandmaster (2010)
- FIDE rating: 2575 (September 2026)
- Peak rating: 2689 (November 2018)
- Peak ranking: No. 52 (January 2019)

Jorge Moisés Cori Tello (Spanish pronunciation: [ˈxoɾxe mojˈses ˈkoɾi ˈteʝo], born 30 July 1995) is a Peruvian chess grandmaster. A former chess prodigy, he was twice world champion and four-time Pan American champion in his age category. Cori competed in the FIDE World Cup in 2011, 2013, 2017, 2019, 2021 and 2025. He has played for the Peruvian team in the Chess Olympiad since 2010.

== Career ==
Cori finished joint first in the under 10 section of the Pan American Youth Chess Festival in 2004 and as a result he was awarded the title of FIDE Master. Following this, he won the gold medal at the Pan American Youth Chess Festival in various age categories: under 10 (2005), under 12 (2006), under 14 (2008) and under 18 (2009). Cori also won the gold medal at the World Youth Chess Championships in the under 14 category in 2009 and the under 16 in 2011.

In October 2007, Cori competed for the first time in the American Continental Championship, where he achieved a 20-game norm for the title International Master. In 2008, he also won the U13 section of the 4th World School Championships, and the bronze medal in the Pan American Under 20 Championship. In that year, he achieved his final norm required for the International Master title in the 11th Málaga Open.

Cori achieved a 20-game norm for the title Grandmaster in the 2009 American Continental Championship and earned his final norm in October 2009. He qualified for the Grandmaster title in January 2010, at the age of 14 years, 5 months and 15 days, when he crossed the 2500 Elo rating mark during the 3rd Jose Marca Memorial Open in Lima, which he won with a score of 7½/9 points. In 2012 he won the bronze medal in the under 18 division at the World Youth Championships in Maribor, Slovenia.

In May 2013, Cori finished tied for third (fourth on tiebreak) in the American Continental Championship and as a result he qualified for the Chess World Cup 2013. In July 2013, he won the 18th Balaguer Open. In the following month, he competed in the World Cup in Tromsø, Norway; after drawing the two classical games against Teimour Radjabov, Cori won the first rapid game, but lost the second one. In the third game he didn't show up in time, as Cori, due to language barrier, misunderstood the start time (6:50 instead of 6:15), and was forfeited due to "zero tolerance" rule; he drew the fourth game and therefore was eliminated from the tournament. Later that month, in August 2013, he placed second at the Open of Sants, Hostafrancs & La Bordeta in Barcelona, behind Adhiban Baskaran. In September 2013, Cori tied for 3rd–4th in the World Junior Championship. He tied for first place, placing third on countback, in the 3rd Panama Open scoring 7/9.

In July 2014, he tied for first in the Benasque Open with 6½/9 points, placing second on countback. Later that month, he finished runner-up in the 5th Iberoamerican Championship in Linares, Jaén, Spain. In April 2015, Cori won the 6th Latin Chess Cup in Vicente Lopez, Argentina, edging out Axel Bachmann on tiebreak. In May 2015, his first place the Zonal 2.4 Championship qualified him for the Chess World Cup 2015. Later in the same month, he finished third in the 10th American Continental Championship in Montevideo. Cori decided to not participate in the World Cup in order to compete for the last time in the World Junior Championship and his spot was taken by his sister Deysi, who finished third in the Zonal 2.4 Championship. In 2016, at the 42nd Chess Olympiad, he won an individual bronze medal playing board 2 thanks to his rating performance of 2810.

In October 2018, Cori was the best individual player in the 43rd Chess Olympiad (open event) in Batumi (Georgia) by scoring 7½ out of 8 points (seven wins and one draw) with a rating performance of 2925.

== Personal life ==
His sister Deysi Cori is an International Master.
