= Vitaly Kunin =

Russian-German chess grandmaster (born 1983)

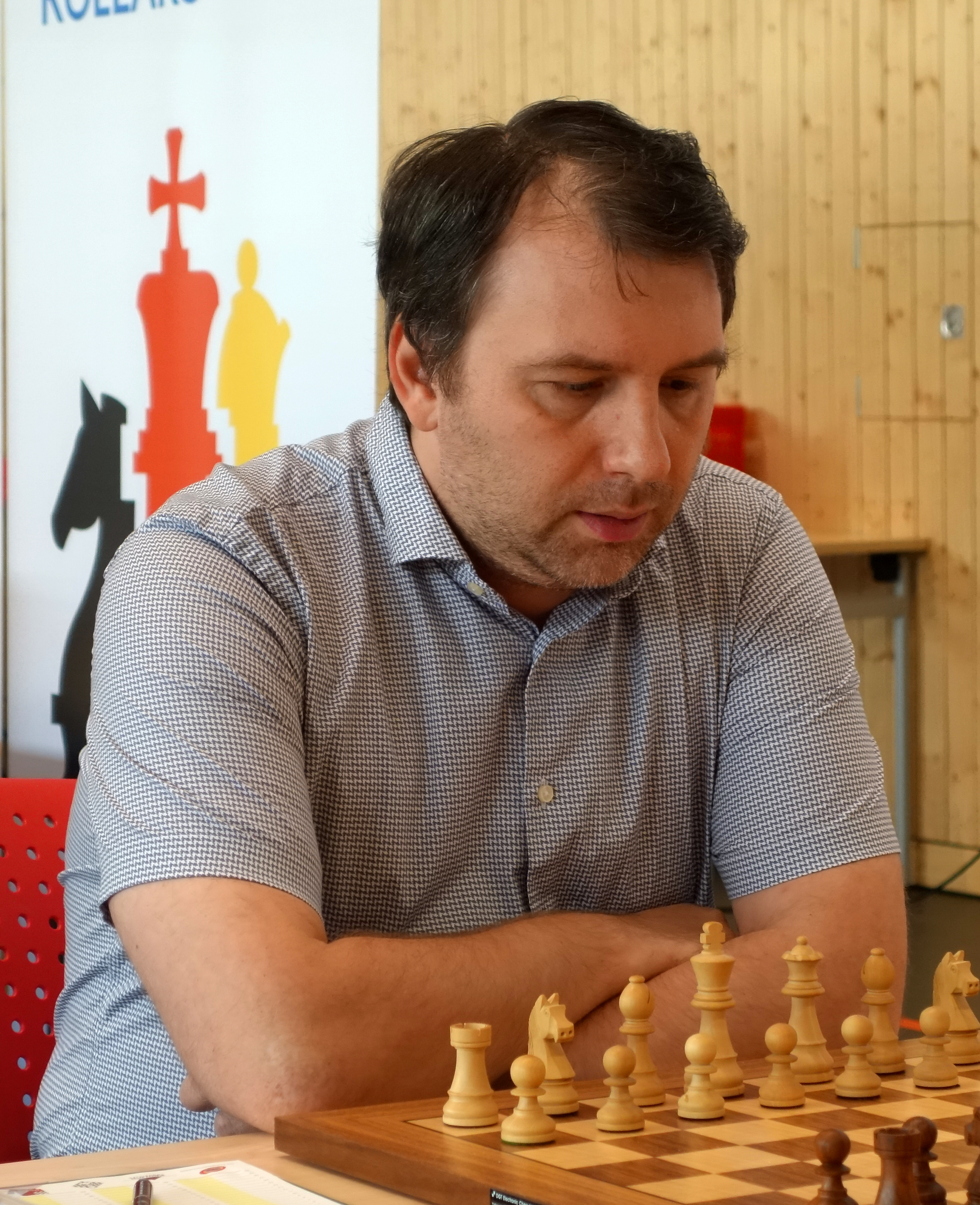

Personal information
- Born: October 2, 1983 (age 42) Moscow, Soviet Union

Chess career
- Country: Germany
- Title: Grandmaster (2006)
- FIDE rating: 2519 (July 2026)
- Peak rating: 2595 (May 2016)

Vitaly Leonidovich Kunin (born 2 October 1983) is a German chess player. He was awarded the title of Grandmaster (GM) by FIDE in 2006.

== Chess career ==
He played in the Chess World Cup 2017, where he was defeated in the first round by Lê Quang Liêm.
