= Jose Daniel Gemy =

Bolivian chess player (born 1992)

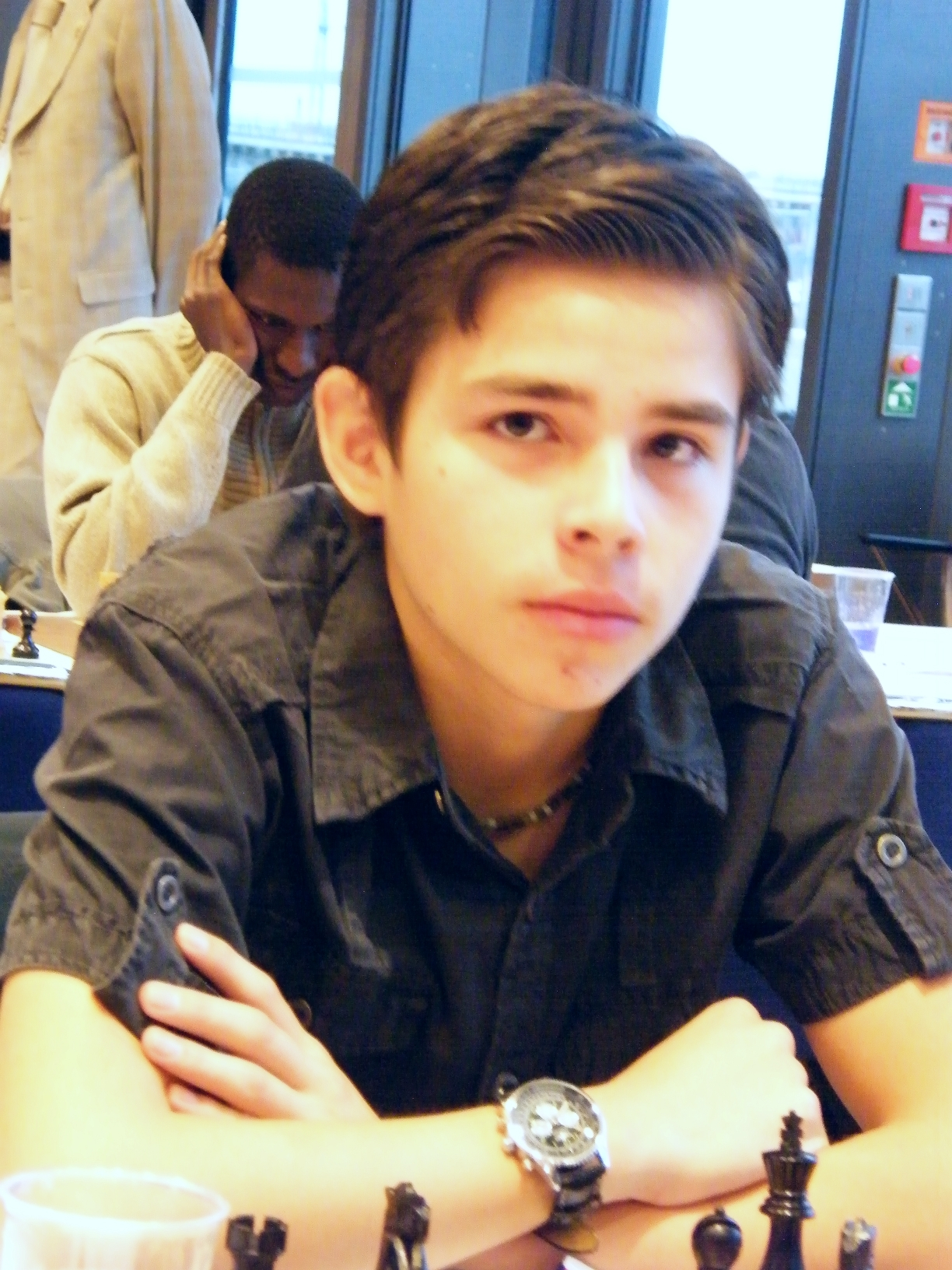
- Gemy at the 38th Chess Olympiad in Dresden, 2008

Personal information
- Born: September 11, 1992 (age 33)

Chess career
- Country: Bolivia
- Title: International Master (2012)
- Peak rating: 2418 (August 2015)

Jose Daniel Gemy (born 11 September 1992) is a Bolivian chess International Master since 2012, and a FIDE Master since 2010. He is ranked second in Bolivia.

He won the Pan American Junior Chess Championship in 2012, and the Bolivian Chess Championship in 2012, 2013, 2015-2017, 2020 and 2022.

In the 3rd Marcel Duchamp Cup, he reached 6th to 15th place (out of 131 players) with a score of 6.5/9.
