= Neuris Delgado Ramírez =

Cuban-Paraguayan chess grandmaster (born 1981)

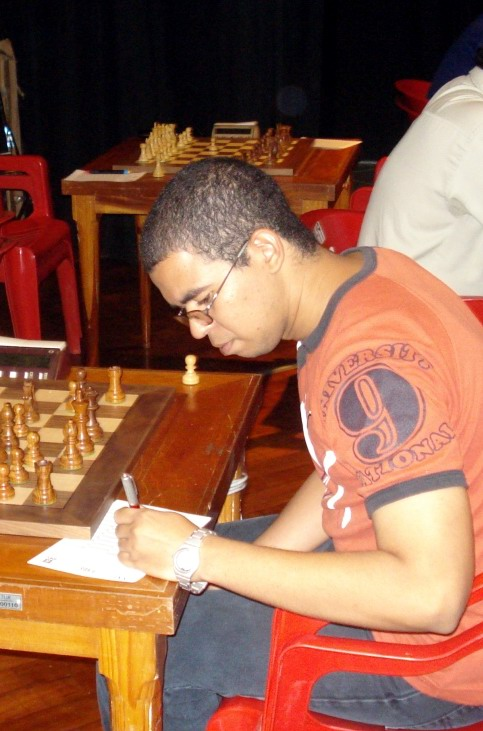
- Delgado in 2008

Personal information
- Born: September 17, 1981 (age 44) Bayamo, Cuba

Chess career
- Country: Cuba (until 2010); Colombia (2010-2013); Paraguay (since 2013)
- Title: Grandmaster (2002)
- FIDE rating: 2519 (July 2026)
- Peak rating: 2636 (January 2020)

Neuris Delgado Ramírez (born September 17, 1981) is a Cuban-Paraguayan chess player who received the FIDE title of Grandmaster in 2002.

He played for Cuba at the Chess Olympiad in 2002, 2004 and 2006. Since 2014, Delgado Ramírez has represented Paraguay in this competition.

He competed in the FIDE World Cup in 2017 and 2019. Delgado Ramírez was knocked out in the first round on both occasions, after losing to Vidit Santosh Gujrathi and Luke McShane respectively.
