= Deysi Cori =

Peruvian chess player (born 1993)

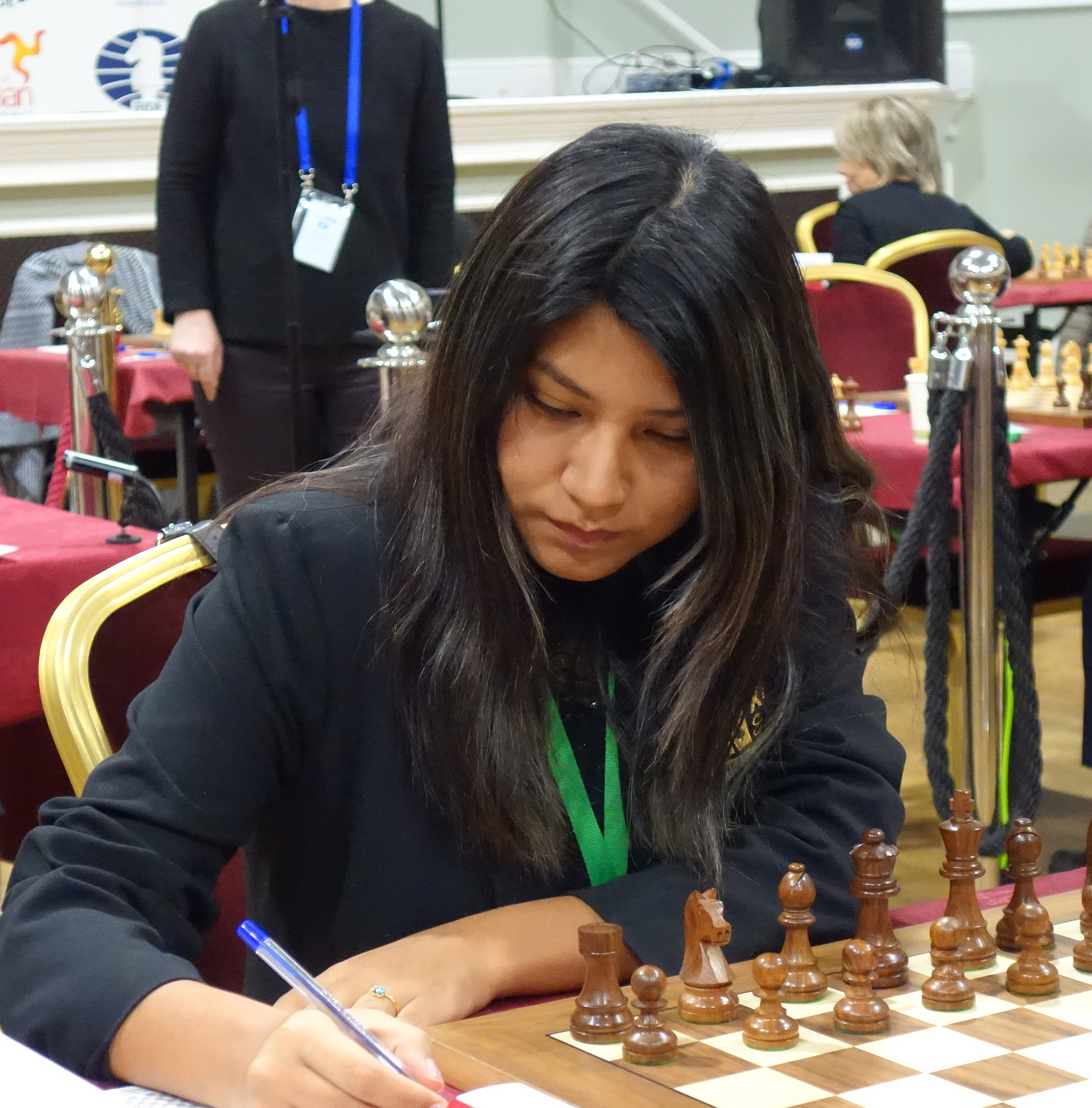
- Deysi Cori Tello in 2023

Personal information
- Born: Deysi Estela Cori Tello; 2 July 1993 (age 33) Lima, Peru

Chess career
- Country: Peru
- Title: International Master (2023); Woman Grandmaster (2010)
- Peak rating: 2444 (February 2015)

Deysi Estela Cori Tello (born 2 July 1993) is a Peruvian chess player, who holds the titles of International Master (IM) and Woman Grandmaster (WGM), and is a three-time American Continental women's champion. At junior level, she was twice world champion and six-time Pan American champion in her age girls category. Cori is the top ranked female player of Peru and has played for the national team of her country in the Women's Chess Olympiad since 2004. She competed in the FIDE World Cup in 2013 and 2015, and in the Women's World Chess Championship in 2010, 2012, 2015 and 2017.

== Career ==
Deysi Cori won the gold medal at the Pan American Youth Chess Festival in various categories: girls under 10 (2003), girls under 12 (2004), girls under 14 (2007), girls under 16 (2008) and girls under 18 (2011). Also in 2008, Cori won the Pan American Girls U-20 Championship and the World School Chess Championships in the girls under 15 division.

In 2004, at the age of eleven, Cori made her debut on the national women's team at the 36th Chess Olympiad. She played on the reserve board and scored 5 points out of 7 (four wins, two draws, one loss). She finished tied for first with Martha Fierro in the Women's American Continental Championship in September 2009, placing second on tiebreak. In November 2009, Cori tied for first place at the World U-20 Girls Championship, taking the silver medal on tiebreaks. Later that month, she won the girls under 16 section of the World Youth Chess Championship in Antalya, Turkey, winning nine of her first ten games, and clinched the title with a round to spare. In November 2010, Cori finished second in the girls under 18 division of the World Youth Championships in Porto Carras, Greece. Cori won the American Continental Women's Championship for the first time in June 2011. In August 2011, she won the World U-20 Girls Championship in Chennai, India and this achievement earned her the qualification for the Women's World Chess Championship 2012.

In May 2013, Cori tied for third place with her brother, Jorge Cori, and Argentine grandmaster Diego Flores in the American Continental Championship, placing fifth on tiebreak, and as a result qualified for the Chess World Cup 2013. In December 2014, she finished tied for second (third on countback) in the 5th Latin American Cup scoring 7/9, a point behind the winner, Cuban grandmaster Lázaro Bruzón. In May 2015, she placed third in the Zonal 2.4 championship, which qualified the top two players for the Chess World Cup 2015. She earned a spot in the latter when her brother Jorge, who came first in the Zonal 2.4, renounced his. In February 2016, Cori won for the second time the American Continental Women's Championship, which was held in her hometown, Lima. In September 2017, she won this championship for the third time in Villa Martelli, Argentina with a round to spare.
