= Emiliano Saguier =

Paraguayan chess player

Personal information
- Born: unknown
- Died: unknown

Chess career
- Country: Paraguay

Emiliano Saguier (unknown – unknown), was a Paraguayan chess player, three-times Paraguayan Chess Championship winner (1967, 1968, 1969).

== Biography ==
In the 1960s Emiliano Saguier was one of Paraguay's leading chess players. He three times in row won Paraguayan Chess Championships: 1967, 1968, and 1969. Emiliano Saguier was participant of a number of international chess tournaments held in Latin America.

Emiliano Saguier played for Paraguay in the Chess Olympiad:

- In 1964, at second board in the 16th Chess Olympiad in Tel Aviv (+4, =8, -5).
