= Leonardo Tristán =

Argentine chess grandmaster (born 1989)

Personal information
- Born: November 22, 1989 (age 36) Necochea, Argentina

Chess career
- Country: Argentina
- Title: Grandmaster (2020)
- FIDE rating: 2487 (July 2026)
- Peak rating: 2561 (January 2022)

Leonardo Tristán is an Argentine chess grandmaster.

== Chess career ==
He achieved the Grandmaster title in 2020, earning his norms at the:

- XXII Magistral de la República Argentina Copa Mercosur in August 2018
- X Magistral Grafica Yael Torre Blanca in August 2019
- 94 Final Campeonato Argentino Superior in September 2019

In March 2024, he finished in third place at the 53rd City of Mar del Plata International Chess Open.

In December 2025, he tied for third place in the Argentine Chess Championship with Diego Valerga, but was ranked fourth after tiebreak scores.
