= Amir Reza Pourramezanali =

Iranian chess grandmaster (born 1992)

Amirreza Pourramezanali
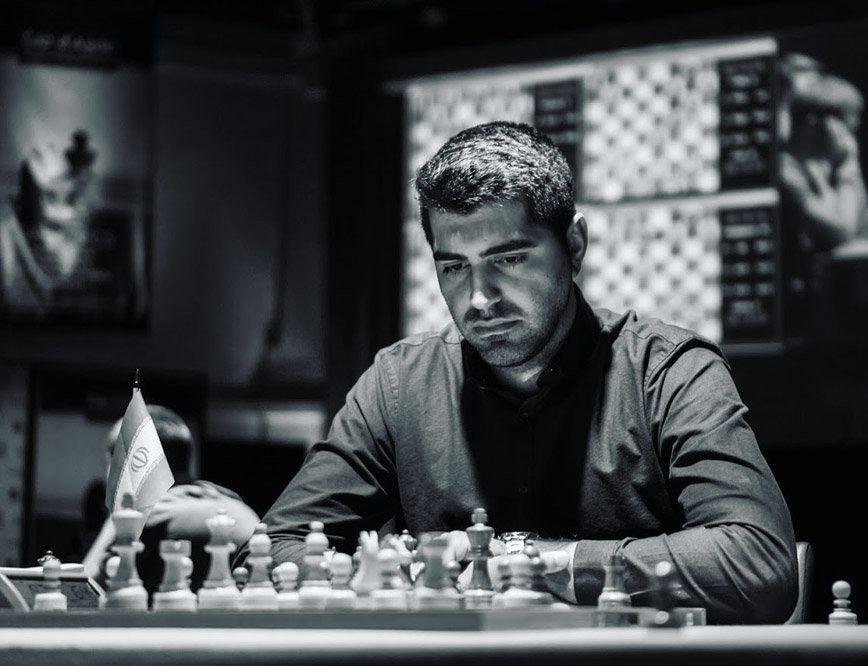

Personal information
- Born: 23 September 1992 (age 33) Rasht, Iran

Chess career
- Country: Iran
- Title: Grandmaster (2016)
- FIDE rating: 2521 (July 2026)
- Peak rating: 2543 (October 2017)

Amirreza Pourramezanali (Persian: امیررضا پوررمضانعلی; born September 23, 1992) is an Iranian chess Grandmaster (2016). On the May 2016 FIDE list, he had an Elo rating of 2515.

== List of career achievements ==
- Grandmaster since 2016
- International Master since 2014
- Fide Master since 2010
- 2nd place Young talents Anatoly Karpov Trophy-Cap d'agde France 2017
- Participant of Fide Chess World Cup Tbilisi 2017
- Champion of Asian Zonal 3.1 Tehran 2017
- Bronze medal with Iranian Team in World Chess University Championship 2016
- Bronze medal with Iranian National Team in Asian Nations Cup 2014
- Bronze medal Asian Youth Championship Under 18
- Silver medal with Iranian Team in Asian Youth Championship
- Champion of Moscow Grandmaster Tournament 2015
- Champion of Tblissi Grandmaster Summer Tournament 2016
- Champion of 6th Lian Open (2014)
- Champion of Ardebil International Blitz Cup 2015
- Silver medal of Iranian Blitz Championship 2015
- Silver medal in Poland Open 2008
- Gold medal Iran youth Championship under 14,16,18
