= Facundo Vazquez =

Uruguayan chess player (born 2004)

Personal information
- Born: 2004 (age 21–22) Montevideo, Uruguay

Chess career
- Country: Uruguay
- Title: International Master (2025)
- FIDE rating: 2400 (October 2026)
- Peak rating: 2431 (May 2025)

Facundo Vazquez Furtado is a Uruguayan chess player.

== Chess career ==
In April 2023, he finished as runner-up in the Uruguayan Chess Championship for the third consecutive year.

In September 2024, he played on board 3 at the 45th Chess Olympiad for Uruguay, where he scored 6/9 and drew against grandmaster Nikola Djukić and won against grandmaster Li Min Peng.

In February 2025, he finished as runner-up in the Ciudad de Montevideo Open.

He played in the Chess World Cup 2025, where he was defeated by Rasmus Svane in the first round.

In March 2026, he won the La Proa International Closed Tournament with a score of 6.5/9. He has been regarded as a leading figure in Uruguayan chess.
