= Eleuterio Recalde =

Paraguayan chess player

Personal information
- Born: 18/04/1938
- Died: 29/03/2019

Chess career
- Country: Paraguay

Eleuterio Recalde (unknown – unknown), was a Paraguayan chess player, Paraguayan Chess Championship winner (1960).

== Biography ==
In the 1960s Eleuterio Recalde was one of Paraguay's leading chess players. He won Paraguayan Chess Championships in 1960. He was participant of international chess tournaments in Asunción (1960) and Montevideo (1961). In 1960, in São Paulo Eleuterio Recalde participated in World Chess Championship South American Zonal tournament.

Eleuterio Recalde played for Paraguay in the Chess Olympiad:

- In 1968, at second board in the 18th Chess Olympiad in Lugano (+3, =7, -3).
