= Ronaldo Cantero =

Paraguayan chess player

Personal information
- Born: unknown
- Died: 9 June 2006

Chess career
- Country: Paraguay

Ronaldo Cantero (unknown – 9 June 2006), was a Paraguayan chess player, eight-times Paraguayan Chess Championship winner (1954, 1955, 1956, 1957, 1958, 1961, 1962, 1965).

== Biography ==
From the mid-1950s to the end of 1960s Ronaldo Cantero was one of Paraguay's leading chess players. He eight times won Paraguayan Chess Championships: 1954, 1955, 1956, 1957, 1958, 1961, 1962, and 1965. Ronaldo Cantero was participant of a number of international chess tournaments held in Latin America. The best result he was shown in 1956, when he took 3rd place at the international chess tournament in Montevideo, leaving behind only Grandmasters (GM) Miguel Najdorf and Erich Eliskases. In 1957, in Rio de Janeiro Ronaldo Cantero participated in World Chess Championship South American Zonal tournament and shared 9th–10th place.

Ronaldo Cantero played for Paraguay in the Chess Olympiads:

- In 1964, at third board in the 16th Chess Olympiad in Tel Aviv (+5, =8, -6),
- In 1968, at first reserve board in the 18th Chess Olympiad in Lugano (+0, =6, -1).
