= Claudia Amura =

Argentine chess player (born 1970)

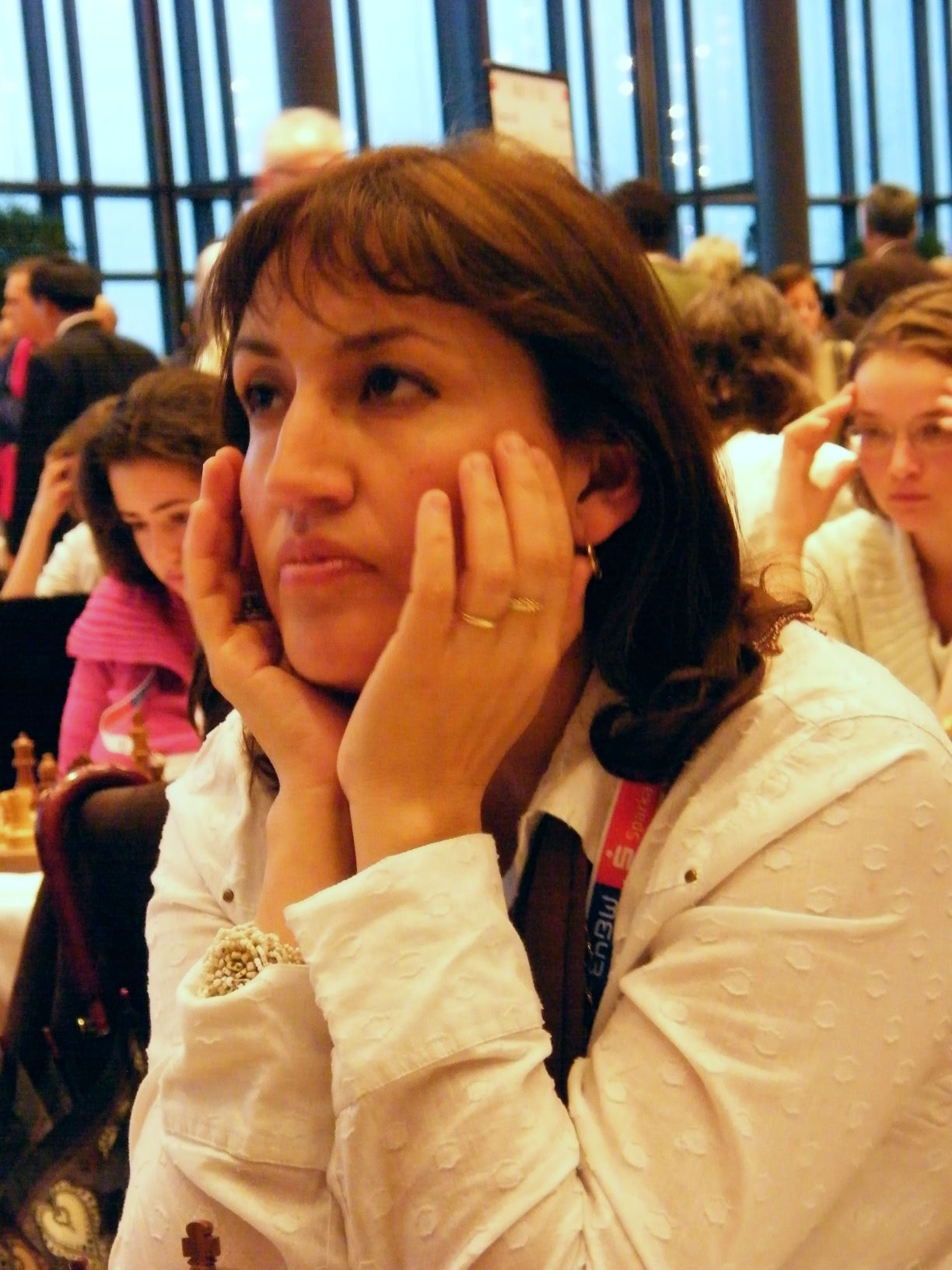
- Amura in 2008

Personal information
- Born: August 26, 1970 (age 55) Buenos Aires, Argentina
- Spouse: Gilberto Hernández Guerrero (m. 1997)

Chess career
- Country: Argentina
- Title: Woman Grandmaster (1998)
- Peak rating: 2405 (January 1991)

Claudia Noemí Amura (born 26 August 1970) is an Argentine chess player holding the title of Woman Grandmaster.

Born in Buenos Aires, Amura learned how to play chess when she was seven years old. At the age of 13 she won the Argentine youth championship against mostly boys.

She was the first Iberoamerican to achieve the FIDE title of Woman Grandmaster (WGM) and rose to the 12th place in the FIDE women's ranking in 1991. She won the Panamerican women's championship in Venezuela 1997 and five South American women's championships (1990, 1992, 1994, 1996, 1998, 1999).

Amura has won the Women's Argentine Championship five times (1985, 1987, 1988, 1989, 2014) and played in the Women's Chess Olympiad eight times (1988, 1990, 1992, 1994, 1998, 2008, 2010, 2014). At Novi Sad 1990 she won the individual silver medal on the first board.

When playing against men, she won the Grand Prix Open 1990 in Buenos Aires and the Buenos Aires championship 1992. She has also played in three Argentine Championships.

Amura has written chess columns for Argentine newspapers La Nación, Página/12 and El Liberal. Her husband is Gilberto Hernández.
