= Leandro Krysa =

Argentine chess grandmaster (born 1992)

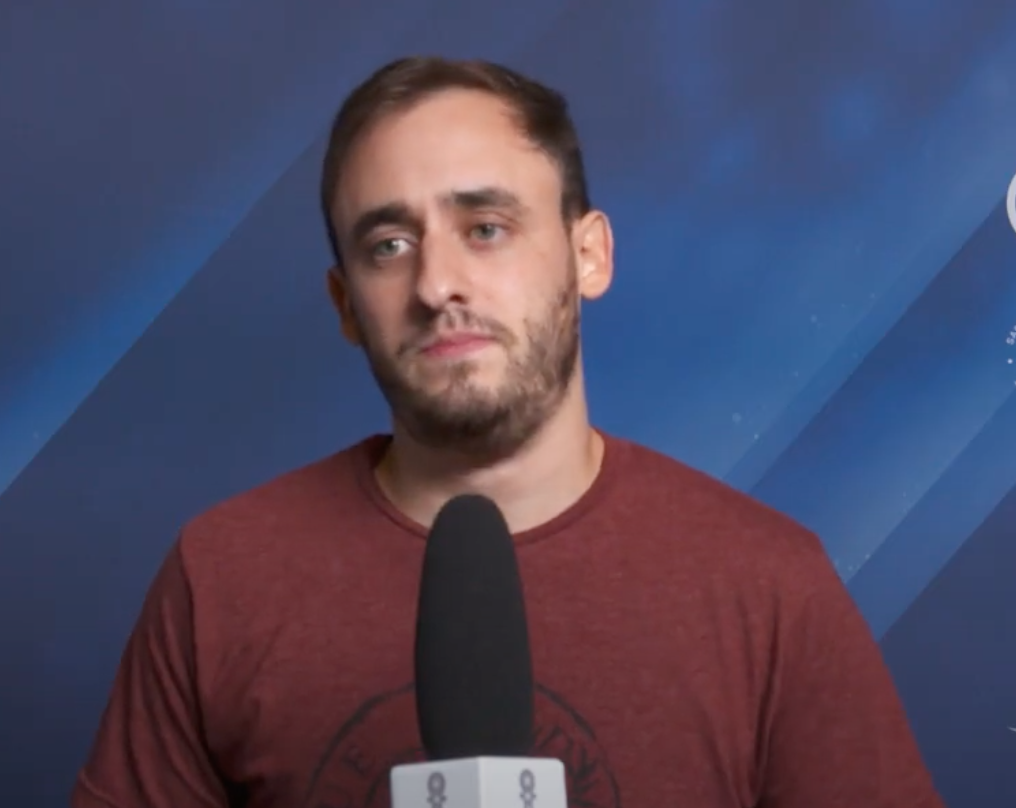
- Krysa in 2022

Personal information
- Born: 7 November 1992 (age 33) Buenos Aires, Argentina

Chess career
- Country: Argentina
- Title: Grandmaster (2017)
- FIDE rating: 2442 (September 2026)
- Peak rating: 2549 (July 2023)

Leandro Sergio Krysa (born 7 November 1992) is an Argentine chess Grandmaster, sports journalist, and FIDE Trainer. He was officially awarded the title of Grandmaster (GM) by FIDE in 2017, becoming the 33rd Grandmaster in Argentine history.

Krysa has represented the Argentine national team at the 44th and 45th Chess Olympiads (Chennai 2022 and Budapest 2024), establishing himself as one of the country's premier international competitors. He is a two-time FIDE World Cup participant, having qualified for the 2017 edition in Tbilisi, Georgia, and the 2021 edition in Sochi, Russia. In December 2025, he reached a major national milestone by capturing the absolute Argentine Blitz Chess Championship.

Alongside his individual successes in major international opens across South America and Europe, Krysa has developed a prominent career as a team captain and player in European leagues, leading club teams to multiple championship titles. Outside of his competitive play, he holds a degree in sports journalism and works extensively as a high-performance chess coach.

== Early life and education ==
Leandro Sergio Krysa was born on 7 November 1992 in the neighborhood of Villa Urquiza, Buenos Aires, Argentina. At the age of six, he and his brother, Ariel Krysa, were introduced to the basic rules of chess by their maternal grandfather, Manfredo. Due to the brothers' high energy levels, Manfredo taught them the game at the family's furniture store as a way to channel their focus, and Leandro quickly began standing out in local school tournaments.

He developed his early chess skills at the Sociedad Hebraica Argentina (SHA), where he studied under instructors Sandra Malajovich and Iacov Schenkman. He later accelerated his progress under the mentorship of FIDE Master Gustavo Águila. Outside of chess, Krysa pursued studies in sports journalism, graduating from the ETER school of communication in Buenos Aires.

== Chess career ==
=== Early achievements and International Master title ===
Krysa achieved significant success during his youth, consistently competing in school and metropolitan tournaments organized by the Metropolitan Chess Federation (FMDA). 2011 proved to be a breakthrough year for his career; he won the Argentine Under-20 Chess Championship, a national title he successfully defended the following year by becoming back-to-back U20 Argentine Champion in 2011 and 2012.

On the international stage in May 2011, Krysa earned the silver medal at the South American Under-20 Chess Championship in Tarija, Bolivia. He tied for first place with 7 points alongside Federico Pérez Ponsa, finishing second on tiebreak criteria, a performance that officially secured him the title of International Master (IM). Later that year, he won the Pan-American Under-20 Chess Championship in Ecuador, an achievement that also granted him his first Grandmaster (GM) norm.

In the following years, Krysa established himself as a dominant player in both national and international open circuits:

- In 2011, he won the traditional Abierto de Ballester.
- In 2013, he claimed his first victory at the 44th International "Ciudad de Mar del Plata" Open, a feat he repeated in 2016 at the 47th edition of the tournament.
- In July 2014, he finished undefeated with 5.5 out of 6 points to win the "149th Anniversary of the City of Lincoln" International Open.
- In January 2015, as part of his first competitive chess tour across Europe, he finished as the runner-up at the 40th Seville International Chess Open (Abierto Internacional de Ajedrez Ciudad de Sevilla) in Spain. He remained undefeated, scoring 7.5 out of 9 points and tying for first place alongside Spanish IM Ernesto Fernández. Additionally, he was awarded the tournament's "Emilio Conejo in memoriam" Beauty Prize (Premio de Belleza) for his tactical victory against Daniel López González, recorded in international chess databases.

=== Grandmaster title and World Cup competitions ===
In late 2016, Krysa embarked on a competitive tour across Europe aimed at securing his remaining title qualifications. After initial stages in Barcelona, he successfully achieved his second Grandmaster (GM) norm in December 2016 at the 5th Lorca International Open (Abierto Internacional de Lorca) in Murcia, Spain.

Shortly after, in early 2017, Krysa achieved the highest title in chess by earning his third and final Grandmaster norm at the prestigious Tradewise Gibraltar Chess Festival. During the tournament, he performed at an elite level, securing historic draws against world-class players, including former World Champion Veselin Topalov and world number two Fabiano Caruana. With this milestone, Krysa officially became the 33rd Grandmaster in Argentine history.

In May 2017, Krysa continued his excellent form by competing in the FIDE Zonal 2.5 tournament, held at the Círculo de Ajedrez de Villa Martelli in Argentina. He finished undefeated in second place, scoring 7.5 points out of 9 rounds and finishing just behind tournament champion Sandro Mareco. This outstanding performance secured his direct qualification for the FIDE Chess World Cup 2017 in Tbilisi, Georgia, where he was eliminated in the opening round by elite Chinese Grandmaster Li Chao by a score of 1.5–0.5.

In 2021, Krysa qualified for his second world cup appearance through the American Continental Hybrid Chess Championship, an event played online under physical arbiter supervision at Villa Martelli due to COVID-19 pandemic restrictions. In a highly dramatic knockout bracket, Krysa advanced by winning consecutive, high-stakes Armageddon tiebreak matches. He first defeated Cuban Grandmaster Luis Ernesto Quesada Pérez in the semifinals and repeated the feat in the final match against Armenian-American Grandmaster Varuzhan Akobian. This achievement earned him a spot at the FIDE World Cup 2021 in Sochi, Russia, where he was defeated in the first round by Cuban Grandmaster Yasser Quesada Pérez by a narrow margin of 1.5–0.5.

=== National team and Chess Olympiads ===
Krysa made his official debut for the Argentine national team at the 44th FIDE Chess Olympiad in Chennai, India, in 2022. Despite traveling initially as the team's alternate (reserve) player, he went on to have a breakthrough tournament, becoming Argentina's most outstanding performer. He scored an impressive 7 points out of 9 possible games, suffering only one defeat throughout the entire competition.

Due to his solid performance and consistency on the international stage, Krysa was selected once again to represent his country at the 45th FIDE Chess Olympiad, held in Budapest, Hungary, in September 2024. Playing on the demanding second board, he delivered another highly solid performance, losing only a single game throughout the tournament. Among his most notable achievements in Budapest were hard-fought draws against elite competitors, including former FIDE World Champion Ruslan Ponomariov and German Grandmaster Dmitrij Kollars.

=== European leagues and club career ===
Krysa has developed a highly successful career competing in European club leagues. In 2021 and 2022, he represented Epgaia, delivering praised individual performances that included a notable victory against elite Indian Grandmaster S. L. Narayanan.365chess.com

His outstanding results and consistency led to his promotion to the franchise's premier team, AX GAIA. Serving simultaneously as both a key player and the team captain, Krysa led AX GAIA to a historic three-year championship streak, capturing consecutive league titles in 2023, 2024, and 2025.fide.com During the championship-winning campaigns of 2024 and 2025, Krysa shared the roster and competed alongside world chess icon and legendary Ukrainian Grandmaster Vassily Ivanchuk.fide.com

In the Spanish Team Chess Championship (Campeonato de España por Equipos), Krysa has been a mainstay for the Seville-based club Peña Ajedrecística Oromana since 2021.info64.org In his debut year with the club, he helped the team achieve promotion to the Spanish First Division (Primera División). After several highly competitive seasons, Krysa and Oromana secured a historic promotion to the División de Honor (the highest tier of the Spanish club league) in 2024.365chess.com

=== Rapid and Blitz achievements ===
Krysa has excelled in faster chess time controls, capturing significant titles across South America and Europe. In December 2025, he claimed the Argentine Blitz Chess Championship in Buenos Aires, finishing ahead of a highly competitive national field.federacionargentinadeajedrez.org During the same national event, he also finished as the runner-up in the Argentine Rapid Chess Championship, placing second just behind tournament champion Sandro Mareco.federacionargentinadeajedrez.org

On the international circuit, Krysa won the prestigious Dos Hermanas International Rapid Open in Andalusia, Spain. In 2018, he achieved another major European blitz success at the Perpignan International Chess Festival in France, where he won the blitz tournament after defeating elite French Grandmaster Christian Bauer in the final match.echecs.asso.fr Recently, in May 2026, he achieved top honors at the V International "Tres Fronteras" Open in Foz do Iguaçu on the border of Brazil, Argentina, and Paraguay, where he clinched the International Blitz tournament and finished as the runner-up in the Rapid championship.chessbase.com

Following a standout performance in the online qualifying stages, Krysa recently secured a direct qualification for the Esports Nations Cup (ENC) representing the Argentine national team. He is scheduled to compete in the tournament's final stages in Saudi Arabia alongside Argentine chess prodigy Faustino Oro.fide.com Over his career, he has accumulated numerous open titles throughout various regional rapid and blitz circuits in Spain.

== Journalism and coaching career ==
Outside of his competitive play, Krysa has established a prominent career in sports journalism and chess instruction. He graduated as a professional sports journalist from the ETER school of communication in Buenos Aires.laizquierdadiario.com As a writer, he has contributed specialized chess columns, tournament chronicles, and analytical articles for the prominent Argentine national newspaper Página/12.pagina12.com.ar Additionally, he has worked as a content writer and editor for the Obras AySA digital platform, covering sports developments and community chess initiatives.fide.com

As an instructor, Krysa began his coaching career at the early age of 16, working as an assistant teacher at the Sociedad Hebraica Argentina (SHA) chess school, the same institution where he had previously developed his foundational skills.laizquierdadiario.com Over the years, he formalized his educational approach by creating his own specialized digital training system known as "El Método Krysa" (The Krysa Method).fide.com

He holds the official title of FIDE Trainer.fide.com On the international stage, he served as the official head coach for the Brazilian women's national team at the 43rd Chess Olympiad in Batumi, Georgia, in 2018.chess-results.com Furthermore, he has been actively involved in coaching and developing high-performance chess programs for players in Mexico.fide.com

== Honours ==
=== Individual ===
Esports Nations Cup (ENC) Argentine National Team Representative (2026) – Secured direct qualification via online stages to represent Argentina in Saudi Arabia.

Argentine Blitz Chess Champion (2025)

International Open "Tres Fronteras" (Foz do Iguaçu) Blitz Winner (2026)

Laval International Open Winner (France, 2019)

Perpignan International Chess Festival Blitz Winner (2018)

Dos Hermanas International Rapid Open Winner (Spain)

International "Ciudad de Mar del Plata" Open Winner (2013, 2016)

International Open "Ciudad de Lincoln" Winner (2014)

Pan-American Under-20 Chess Champion (2011)

Argentine Under-20 Chess Champion (2011, 2012)

Abierto de Ballester Winner (2011)

South American Under-20 Chess Championship Silver Medalist (2011)

Seville International Chess Open Runner-up & "Emilio Conejo" Beauty Prize Winner (2015)

Argentine Rapid Chess Championship Runner-up (2025)

=== Team ===
Argentine National Chess League Champion (Multi-time Champion) – Representing Obras AySA in the highest tiers of the Liga Nacional de Ajedrez (including the Liga Nacional Superior and 1ª División titles).

European Club League Champion (2023, 2024, 2025) – Three-time consecutive champion as player and team captain for AX GAIA.

Spanish First Division (Primera División) Champion & Promotion to División de Honor (2024) – Mainstay player for Peña Ajedrecística Oromana.

Promotion to Spanish First Division (2021) – With Peña Ajedrecística Oromana.
