= Axel Bachmann =

Paraguayan chess grandmaster (born 1989)

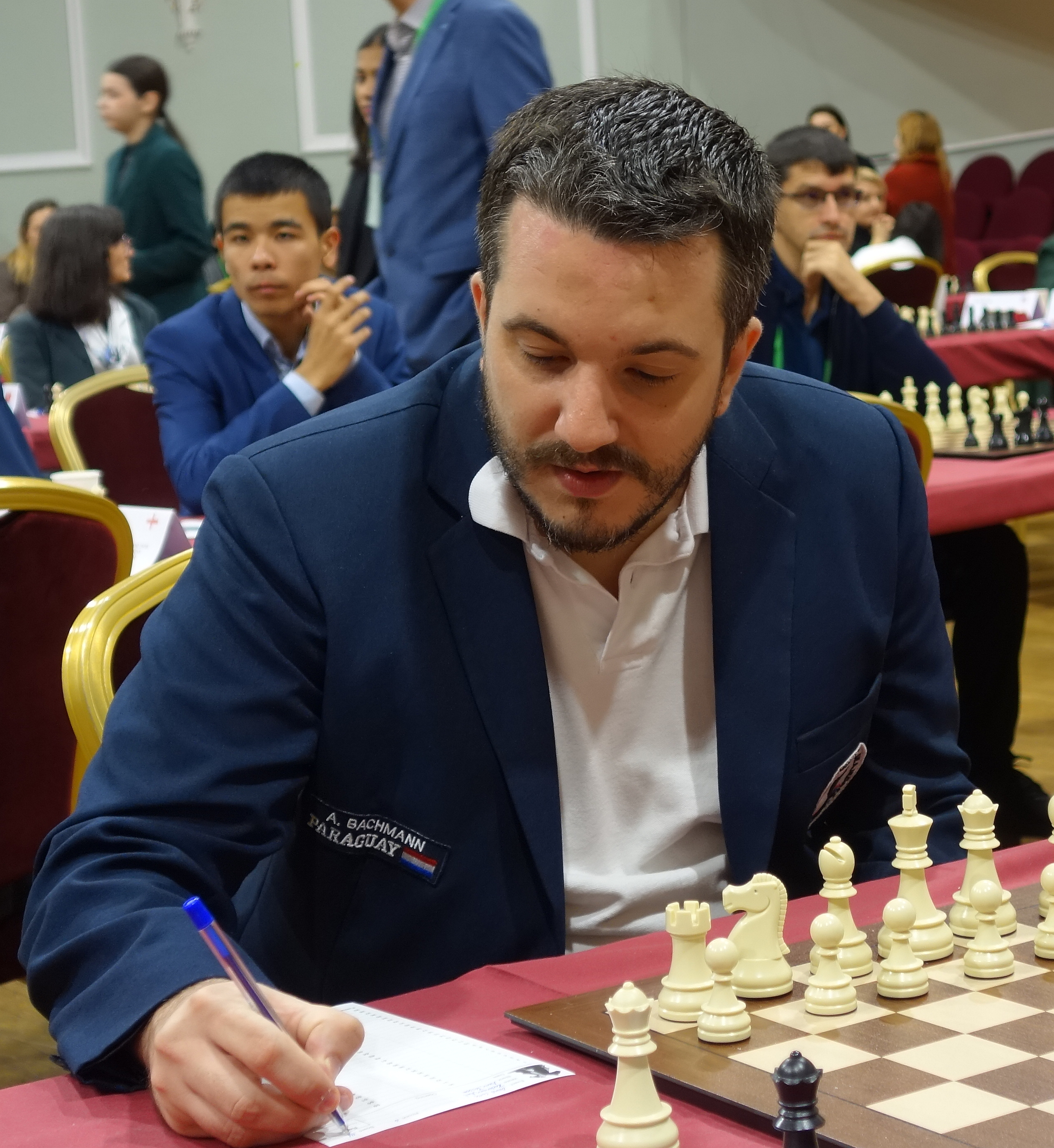
- Bachmann in 2023

Personal information
- Born: Axel Bachmann Schiavo; 4 November 1989 (age 36) Ciudad del Este, Paraguay

Chess career
- Country: Paraguay
- Title: Grandmaster (2007)
- FIDE rating: 2582 (July 2026)
- Peak rating: 2662 (July 2017)
- Peak ranking: No. 85 (July 2017)

Axel Bachmann Schiavo (born 4 November 1989) is a Paraguayan chess player who holds the Grandmaster title. He is the best Paraguayan chess player by rating.

== Biography ==
Bachmann went to study to the University of Texas at Brownsville on a chess scholarship due to a recommendation by Peruvian-American Grandmaster Daniel Fernandez. There, Bachmann was a teammate and training partner of Chilean grandmaster Mauricio Flores Ríos.

Bachmann won the 5th Iberoamerican Chess Championship held in Linares, Jaén, Spain in 2014.

== Career ==
Bachmann won, or tied for first, the following tournaments:

- Pan American Under-16 Championship in Camboriú, Brazil (2005)
- Magistral Mercosur (2007)
- Rochefort International Chess Festival (2014)
- 30th Cappelle-la-Grande Open (2014)
- Iași International Chess Festival (2014)
- Golden Sands Open (2014)
- World Open 2015
- Magistral Ciutat de Barcelona 2015

Bachmann played for Paraguay in the Chess Olympiads:

- of 2004 in Calvià, on the second board (+5 -5 =2)
- of 2006 in Turin, on board three (+6 -2 =4)
- of 2008 in Dresden, on the first board (+4 -4 =2)
- of 2012 in Istanbul, on board one (+5 -3 =2)
- of 2014 in Tromsø, on the top board (+2 -3 =4)

== Notable games ==
- Andrey Vovk vs Axel Bachmann, 2014, Spanish Game: Morphy Defense (C78), 0-1
