= Mahel =

Mahel may refer to:

- Mahel of Hereford (died c. 1164), feudal lord in the Welsh Marches
- Mahel Boyer (born 2004), French chess grandmaster
- Ein Mahel, Muslim village in the Nazareth district
- Brigitte Mahel, leader of The Social Liberals political party in Austria in 2004
- Mahel Sefari or Mahel Safari, a military force in Gugsa Wale's rebellion and De Bono's invasion of Ethiopia
