= Vaghodiya Assembly constituency =

Legislative Assembly constituency in Gujarat State, India

Coordinates: 22.31°N 73.39°E

Vaghodiya
- Constituency No. 136 for the Gujarat Legislative Assembly

Constituency details
- Country: India
- Region: Western India
- State: Gujarat
- District: Vadodara
- Lok Sabha constituency: Vadodara
- Established: 1975
- Total electors: 246,625
- Reservation: None

Member of Legislative Assembly
- 15th Gujarat Legislative Assembly
- Incumbent Dharmendrasinh Vaghela
- Party: Bharatiya Janata Party
- Elected year: 2024

Vaghodiya is one of the 182 Legislative Assembly constituencies of Gujarat state in India. It is part of Vadodara district.

== List of segments ==
This assembly seat represents the following segments,

1. Vaghodia Taluka
2. Vadodara Taluka (Part) Villages – Sokhda, Padmala, Anagadh, Ajod, Asoj, Virod, Sisva, Dasharath, Dhanora, Kotna, Koyli, Dumad, Dena, Sukhlipur, Amaliyara, Kotali, Vemali, Gorva, Ankodiya, Sherkhi, Nandesari (CT), Nandesari (INA), Ranoli (CT), Petro-Chemical Complex (INA), Karachiya (CT), GSFC Complex (INA), Bajwa (CT), Jawaharnagar (Gujarat Refinery) (CT).

== Member of Legislative Assembly ==
Year	Member	Party
2002	Madhu Shrivastav	Bharatiya Janata Party
2007	Madhu Shrivastav	Bharatiya Janata Party
2012	Madhu Shrivastav	Bharatiya Janata Party
2017	Madhu Shrivastav	Bharatiya Janata Party
2022	Dharmendrasinh Vaghela	Independent
2024^	Dharmendrasinh Vaghela	Bharatiya Janata Party

- ^ denotes by-election

== Election results ==
=== 2024 by-election ===
Gujarat Legislative Assembly by-election, 2024: Vaghodiya
Party	Candidate	Votes	%	±%
BJP	Dharmendrasinh Vaghela	127,446	72.1	▲37.12
INC	Kanu Punja Gohil	45,338	25.65	▲15.32
NOTA	None of the Above	3,972	2.25	▲0.81
Majority		82,108	46.45	▲38.78
Turnout		1,76,756		
BJP gain from Independent		Swing		

=== 2022 ===
Gujarat Assembly election, 2022: Vaghodiya Assembly constituency
Party	Candidate	Votes	%	±%
Independent	Dharmendrasinh Vaghela	77,905	42.65	
BJP	Ashvinbhai Natvarbhai Patel (Kaka)	63,899	34.98	
INC	Satyajitsinh Duleepsinh Gaekwad	18870	10.33	
Independent	Madhubhai Babubhai Shrivastav	14645	8.02	
AAP	Gautamkumar Sampatbhai Solanki	2995	1.64	
NOTA	None of the above	2622	1.44	
Majority		14,006	7.67	
Turnout				
Registered electors		243,473		
Independent gain from BJP		Swing		

=== 2017 ===
Gujarat Legislative Assembly Election, 2017: Vaghodiya
Party	Candidate	Votes	%	±%
BJP	Madhu Shrivastav			
NOTA	None of the Above			
Majority				
Turnout				

=== 2012 ===
Gujarat Assembly Election, 2012
Party	Candidate	Votes	%	±%
BJP	Madhubhai Shrivastav	65851	42.55	
INC	Dr. Jayeshbhai Patel	60063	38.81	
Majority		5788	3.74	
Turnout		154760	77.25	
BJP hold		Swing		

=== 2002 ===
Gujarat Assembly Election, 2002
Party	Candidate	Votes	%	±%
BJP	Madhubhai Shrivastav	65,406	62.77	
INC	Pravinbhai Patel	33,792	32.43	
Majority				
Turnout		104193	64.29	
BJP hold		Swing		

== See also ==
- List of constituencies of Gujarat Legislative Assembly
- Gujarat Legislative Assembly
