= Best Bakery case =

2002 legal case in Gujarat, India

The Best Bakery case was a legal case involving the burning down of the Best Bakery, a small outlet in the Hanuman Tekri area in Vadodara, Gujarat, India, on 1 March 2002. During the incident, a mob targeted the Sheikh family who ran the bakery and had taken refuge inside, resulting in the deaths of fourteen people (11 Muslims including family members and 3 Hindu employees of the bakery). This case has come to symbolize the carnage in 2002 Gujarat riots that followed the Godhra train burning. All the 21 accused were acquitted by the court due to shoddy police work and issues with evidence.

== Background ==
On 1 March 2002, communal frenzy enveloped Vadodara. The Best Bakery, a small outlet in the Hanuman Tekri area of Vadodara, was attacked by a mob, which burned down the bakery, killing 14 people. This attack was part of the 2002 Gujarat riots. As per a televised interview by Zaheera Shaikh, one of the survivors who had witnessed the entire saga, a large mob surrounded the bakery in the evening, around 8 pm. They first stole all the goods that were kept in the bakery including sacks of flour. Thereafter they set fire to the bakery and the people inside, most of them Zaheera's relatives, shouting that no one should escape alive from it.

Amnesty International reports that in many cases of the Gujarat violence, police recorded complaints in a "defective" manner, failed to collect witnesses' statements as well as corroborative evidence and did not investigate the responsibility of eminent suspects. The Best Bakery case was seen by human rights organizations in India as a test case given that what Amnesty calls "strong evidence" against the accused existed, but the victims gained little justice.

== Case in 2003 and acquittal ==
The case was tried at a fast court by the Vadodara sessions court judge Hemantsinh U Mahida. It lasted less than two months (9 May to 27 June 2003).

The case hinged on the first hand evidence presented in two first information reports (FIR) that had been presented – that of Raizkhan Amin Mohammed Pathan and of Zaheera Sheikh. In addition, evidence was provided by a large number of witnesses whose evidence was secondary (indirect or hearsay).

The day after the attack, Zaheera Sheikh filed the first informant complaint. Zaheera, a 19-year-old during the incident, was a key and notable witness. She stated that she saw a large mob set fire to their bakery and saw them burn her family members to death. When the mob gathered, shouting communal slogans, her family fled to the terrace and some locked themselves in a first-floor room. The Sheikh family lived in a house directly above the bakery. The mob set the bakery on fire and killings continued from 6 pm to 10 am the next day, a period of sixteen hours. Her statements were recounted for many publications. However, as per documents presented to the court, Zaheera's FIR was registered by the Gujarat Police|police on 4 March 2002, leading the defence to oppose its use and the judge to suspect its validity and the possibility of it having been doctored by the police to implicate innocent people at the expense of the guilty perpetrators. The defence purported that only the FIR that was registered on FIR of 1 March 2002 (by Raizkhan Amin Mohammed Pathan) should be admissible under Section 60 of the Indian Evidence Act.

Further, in court on 23 March 2003, as many as 37 of the 73 witnesses, including Sheikh, turned hostile. It was later alleged by their former mentors that they had received threats to their lives, including from Madhu Shrivastav. Other witnesses gave garbled and self-contradictory witness account, strikingly at variance with the lucid, grammatical and logical written affidavits which had previously been filed in their name. The prosecution claimed that these witnesses had suffered head injuries and were not in a mental state to give an accurate account of their experiences, but could not explain the lucidity of the affidavits. The state government pointed to the lapses by the Gujarat Police in "registering and recording of FIR" and on the part of the prosecution in "recording of evidence" of witnesses in the Best Bakery case.

As a result of all these, the prosecution's case collapsed in court and all of the 21 accused were acquitted. The judgment was delivered on 27 June 2003 by additional sessions judge Hemantsinh U Mahida of the Vadodara fast track court. The judgment said, "It was proved beyond doubt that a violent mob had attacked the bakery and killed 12 persons. However, there was no legally acceptable evidence to prove that any of the accused presented before the court had committed the crime." The judgment was critical of the police for delay in registering FIR and for not investigating the incident properly and harassing innocent people, including the accused.

== Reactions ==
A large section of the press expressed outrage for a prolonged period at the acquittals. It was reported that key witnesses in the case had lied in court out of fear for their lives as they had been given death threats. Key witnesses in the case include the wife and daughter of the bakery owner. They accused party politicians of threatening and harassing them into withdrawing their testimony. According to their testimony to the police and the National Human Rights Commission, 500 people had attacked the bakery. Amnesty International criticized the judgment as "the lack of government commitment to ensuring justice to victims of the communal violence in Gujarat." India's National Human Rights Commission described it as a "miscarriage of justice" and, along with other petitioners, argued that the case should be investigated by an independent agency. The Supreme court expressed displeasure at the acquittal.

The Gujarat government responded by pointing out many other cases where the guilty were left unpunished. Solicitor General Mukul Rohatgi cited the anti-Sikh riots of 1984 and said many of the accused are still free.

== Re-trial and hostile witnesses ==
Soon after the sessions court judgement, Zaheera and her mother gave interviews to the media stating that they had lied in court. On 5 July 2003, Zaheera and her mother told The Sunday Express that Zaheera had lied in court because she had received death threats. On 7 July 2003, Zaheera told the media that Bhartiya Janta Party (BJP) MLA Madhu Srivastava and his cousin, Congress councilor Chandrakant Srivastava were behind the threats, hence she sought a re-trial outside Gujarat. Due to this, media coverage and protests by several citizens groups, the National Human Rights Commission (NHRC) visited Vadodara on 8 July to examine documents related to the case. The NHRC moved a Special Leave Petition in the Supreme Court on 31 July 2003 asking for a retrial outside Gujarat.

Aware of media outrage, three Supreme Court judges ordered the head of Gujarat police and the chief secretary of Gujarat to appear before the court in order to explain their actions in the incident. Chief Justice VN Khare said he had "no confidence" in the Gujarat government, while the Indian Supreme Court criticized the government and ordered a retrial. The Supreme Court ordered that the retrial be moved out of Gujarat after accusing the state government of judicial failures on 12 April 2004 in Maharashtra. The orders were passed by Justice Doraiswamy Raju and Justice Arijit Pasayat.

On 24 September 2004, charges were framed by Judge Abhay Thipsay in Mumbai and the retrial began on 4 October 2004. During the first few weeks, the formal prosecution witnesses were examined and witnesses to the Best Bakery massacre began to testifying on 27 October 2004 as part of the proceedings of Case 315 of 2004 at the Greater sessions court at Mazgaon, Mumbai. These witnesses included Tufel Ahmed, Raees Khan Pathan and Shehzad Khan, who worked at the bakery and witnessed the events.

However, on 3 November 2004, Zaheera filed an affidavit at the High Court stating, "If we don't lie as instructed by Teesta, then these people will get me and my family members killed," Zaheera said with regard to Teesta Setalvad, a journalist and activist who was assisting to obtain justice for the riot victims. Further, she said that "after the fast track court had acquitted the 21 accused, two Muslims had barged into her house and told her that to change her statement in the interest of the community. Thereafter she along with brother were taken to Mumbai to Teesta Setalvad." Her statements were vague, often self-contradictory, but she insisted that she had been kept captive by Setalvad who had made her sign some legal papers. She further said that the matter was taken to Supreme Court against her wishes.

In June 2005, the investigating officer P.P. Kanani was cross examined. Kanani had taken over as investigating officer from Himmatsinh Baria of Panigate Police Station on 10 March 2002. On 29 August 2005, a committee appointed by the Supreme Court of India|Supreme court indicted Zaheera Sheikh as a "liar" and criticized her series of "flip-flop statements". The Government of Gujarat filed an amended appeal in the Gujarat High Court seeking a retrial of the case and the appeal was admitted by the Gujarat High Court. After being indicted by the Supreme Court of India, the police registered a case against Shrivastav Madhubhai Babubhai for intimidating witnesses to the incident.

The government of Gujarat admitted that there were lapses on the part of the Gujarat Police|police in registering and recording FIR in the case and on the part of the prosecution in recording the evidence of witnesses. It said that the police had attempted to help the accused by not submitting names of the accused. Meanwhile, Zahira Sheikh, admitted lying in court and not testifying against the accused. She said she had been threatened by senior figures in the local organisation of Gujarat's ruling party, the Hindu right-wing Bharatiya Janata Party. Thus 17 of the accused charged with murdering 14 people were retried in the case beginning in 2004.

== Perjury ==
A serious dent to Best Bakery case key witness Zaheera Sheikh's credibility, a Supreme Court-appointed committee has indicted her as a "self-condemned liar" falling to "inducements" by "certain persons" to give "inconsistent" statements during the trial of the case. A bench comprising Justice Arijit Pasayat and Justice H K Sema opened the sealed report and read out the three main conclusions of the committee headed by Supreme Court Registrar General B M Gupta. At the same time, the committee gave a clean chit to social activist Teesta Setalavad of the charges of inducement levelled against her by Zahira.

On 10 January 2005, the court referred the matter for inquiry on being faced with the flip-flops of Zahira much to the embarrassment of her one time protector and social activist Setalavad. The bench, after glancing through the over 150-page report, said that the committee has come to the conclusion that there was inducement given to Zahira by certain persons and that there were inconsistencies in her statements. The court made it clear that it has not accepted the report and sought the opinion of the counsel for both Zahira and Setalavad in regard to 'acceptability' of the report.

=== Allegation of false depositions ===
Mother of prime witness in the Best Bakery case Zahira Sheikh, was on Thursday held guilty of contempt of court by the special court conducting the re-trial here. The court imposed a fine of Rs 100 on Sehrunnisa after reading her reply to a show-cause notice issued to her earlier in the day. Sehrunnisa was taken into custody after the trial court initiated contempt proceedings against her for her defiant attitude during her deposition as a witness. While tendering evidence, she frequently looked at Raes Khan, an NGO activist, who was sitting in the court. Even after the judge told her to address the court and not to look at others she continued to look at Raes. The judge warned her that she could be held for contempt, to which Sehrunnisa replied: "Please take action against me." Sehrunnisa said Raes was gesturing at her and hence, she was looking at him.

== Life sentences ==
In February 2006, a court in India convicted nine of the 21 people of murder, sentencing them to life imprisonment. It acquitted 8 others, while issuing warrants for the arrest of four missing persons. Of the nine convicted for life by the trial court, Bombay High Court acquitted five for want of evidence, but upheld the sentence in respect of the remaining four.

The judgment, called "landmark" by BBC journalist Sanjoy Majumder, brought the case to an end. The case has the legacy of being "one of the country's most controversial and high profile trials."

== 2012 Bombay High Court ==
On 9 July 2012, the Bombay High Court, upheld the life sentences of four accused, Sanjay Thakkar, Bahadursingh Chauhan, Sanabhai Baria and Dinesh Rajbhar on the basis of four eyewitness accounts, who were injured bakery employees and identified the accused. It acquitted five accused, Rajubhai Baria, Pankaj Gosavi, Jagdish Rajput, Suresh alias Lalo Devjibhai Vasava and Shailesh Tadvi, for lack of evidence.

== See also ==
- Gulbarg Society massacre
- Naroda Patiya massacre
