= Dharmendrasinh Vaghela =

Indian politician

Member of 15th Gujarat Assembly
- Incumbent
- Assumed office 6 December 2022
- Preceded by: Madhu Shrivastav
- Constituency: Vaghodiya Assembly constituency

Personal details
- Born: 4 December 1967 (age 58) Vadodara, Gujarat, India
- Party: BJP

Dharmendrasinh Vaghela is an Indian politician serving as member of the Gujarat Legislative Assembly since 2022, representing the Vaghodiya Assembly constituency from BJP. In the 2022 Gujarat Legislative Assembly election, Vaghela was elected with 77,905 votes (42.65%).

== Personal life ==
He is 55 years old and has a net worth of ₹500 Cr .
