= Pravin Thipsay =

Indian chess grandmaster (born 1959)

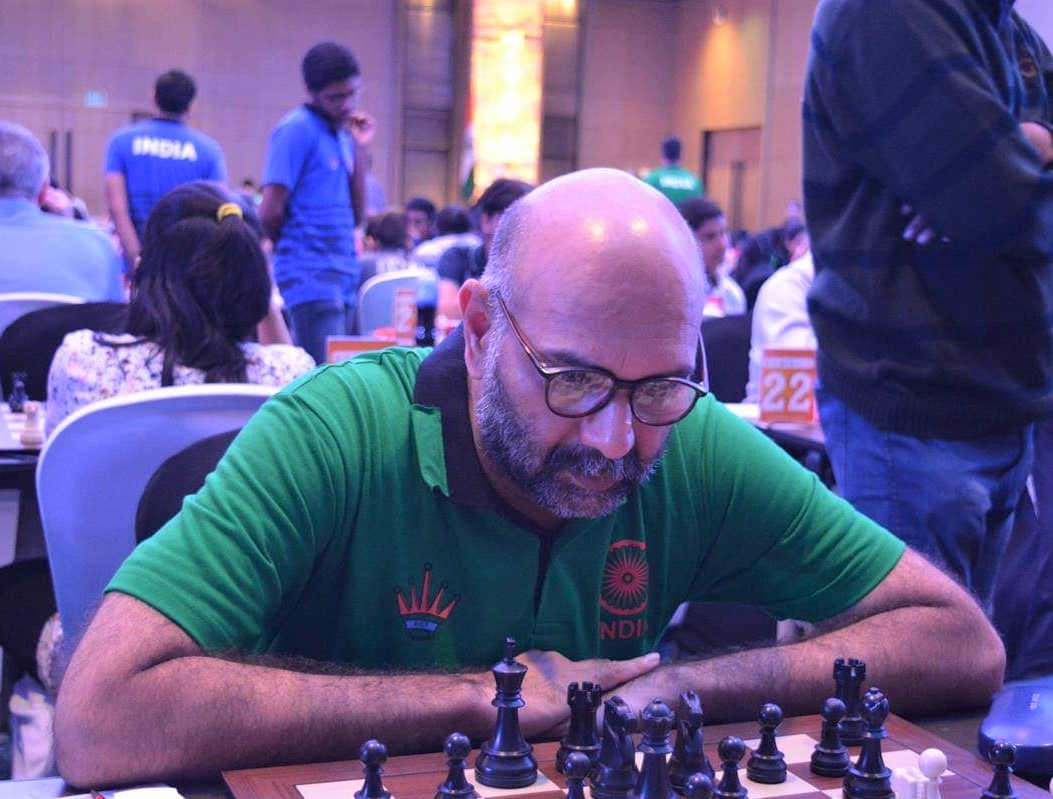
- Thipsay in 2020

Personal information
- Born: Pravin Mahadeo Thipsay; 12 August 1959 (age 66) Mumbai, Maharashtra, India
- Spouse: Bhagyashree Sathe

Chess career
- Country: India
- Title: Grandmaster (1997)
- FIDE rating: 2376 (August 2019)
- Peak rating: 2515 (January 1995)

Pravin Mahadeo Thipsay (born 12 August 1959) is an Indian chess player who holds the FIDE title of Grandmaster. He is the first Indian to get a chess Grandmaster Norm and the first Indian to win the Commonwealth Chess Championship.

== Biography ==
In 1984, the Government of India conferred its highest sports award, the Arjuna Award on him. Thipsay won his first Grandmaster norm in the same year but he could not convert into the Grandmaster title within the stipulated five years.

He won the Indian Chess Championship in 1982 (Kanpur), 1984 (Ahmedabad), 1985 (Tenali), 1989 (Bikaner), 1992, 1993 and 1994 and played for India in the Chess Olympiads of 1982, 1984, 1988, 1992, 1994, 1998 and 2002.

He was the Joint Silver Medalist in the Commonwealth Chess Championship in 1986 (London), in 1989(London), in 1991 (London), in 1994 (London), in 1996 (Kolkata, India), while he won the bronze medals in the Commonwealth Chess Championship in 1999 (Bikaner, India), in 2000 (Sangli, India) and in 2004 (Mumbai, India). He was also the Individual Gold Medalist in Asian Teams Chess Championships in 1983 (New Delhi, India) and in 2003 (Jodhpur, India)

In 1985, Thipsay tied for first with Kevin Spraggett in the Commonwealth Chess Championship. In 1998, he tied for 4-7th with Sergey Zagrebelny, Mohamad Al-Modiahki and Amanmurad Kakageldyev in the Asian Chess Championship in Tehran, in 2004 tied for 2nd–6th behind Marat Dzhumaev in Pune and in the same year tied for 2nd–3rd with Saidali Iuldachev and Chakkravarthy Deepan in Lucknow. In 2007, he won the FIDE Rated All India Open Chess Tournament in Mangalore.

According to Chessmetrics, at his peak in August 1981 Thipsay's play was equivalent to a rating of 2571, and he was ranked number 141 in the world. His best single performance was at Brighton (BCF Championship) 1984, where he scored 6,5 of 10 possible points (65%) against 2549-rated opposition, for a performance rating of 2623.

In 1997, he became the third Indian to attain the Grandmaster title after Anand and Dibyendu Barua.

He used to play on FIDE online arena with the username "Thipsay" and on ChessCube with the username "Hyunthi".

Pravin Thipsay is married to Woman International Master Bhagyashree Sathe Thipsay. The Former Judge of Bombay High Court Abhay Thipsay is his brother.
