= Raja Ravi Sekhar =

Indian chess player

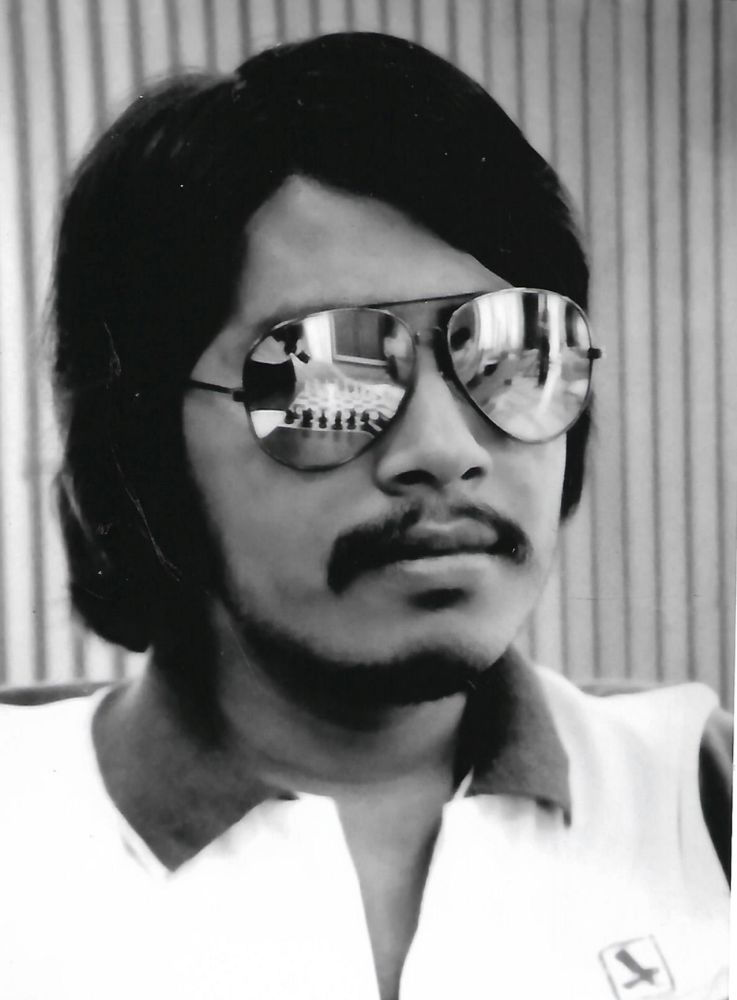
- Raja Ravi Sekhar when he was 27 years old

Personal information
- Born: 17 September 1954 (age 72) Chennai, India

Chess career
- Country: India
- Title: International Master (1981)
- Peak rating: 2430 (July 1984)

Raja Ravi Sekhar (born 17 September 1954), commonly known within chess circles by his initials RRS, is a distinguished Indian chess master and an early trailblazer for the sport in India. Earning the FIDE title of International Master (IM) in 1981, he was a towering presence in national competitions, most notably winning the premier Indian National 'A' Chess Championship twice, in 1976 and 1979. His analytical prowess later expanded beyond the board, earning him the title of International Arbiter (IA) in 1986 before he transitioned into a highly regarded coach. Following his retirement from active professional play in 1993, he shifted his focus entirely to mentorship, founding Raja's Chess Academy in Bengaluru to train generations of emerging Indian chess talents.

== Biography ==
Raja Ravi Sekhar started playing chess at the age of 17. After two years, in 1974, he won the Indian Junior Chess Championship. A year later he wins again this tournament. From 1975 to 1990 he 16 times in a row participated in Indian Chess Championships finals and twice won this tournament - in 1976 and 1980.

== Early life and career ==
Raja Ravi Sekhar was born on 17 September 1954 in Chennai, India. He spent a significant portion of his youth in Andhra Pradesh, away from the traditional chess hubs of the era. He did not take up competitive chess until 1972 at the age of 17. Operating in an era completely devoid of digital engines, modern databases, or formal training networks in India, Ravi Sekhar was entirely self-taught. He learned the fundamentals of the game, chess notation, and strategic planning from a single textbook, Invitation to Chess by Kenneth Harkness.

Despite his late start, Ravi Sekhar rose rapidly through the competitive ranks. In his first year of play, he finished as the top performer for the Tamil Nadu state team at the National-B Championship held in Ahmedabad in May 1973, scoring 9.5/15 points and narrowly missing a National-A seeding by a fraction of a point. His major career breakthrough occurred later that year in December 1973 at St. Stephen's College, New Delhi, where he secured the National Junior (Under-20) Championship. He won the tournament with a flawless 7/7 perfect score, securing the national title with a round to spare before going on to defeat the Delhi Champion, Ashok Alexander, in the final round. This milestone initiated a dominant run that culminated in his historic national "Triple Crown" victory two years later.

Raja Ravi Sekhar played for India in the Chess Olympiads:

- In 1980, at first board in the 24th Chess Olympiad in La Valletta (+3, =6, -4),
- In 1982, at second board in the 25th Chess Olympiad in Lucerne (+3, =3, -3),
- In 1984, at second board in the 26th Chess Olympiad in Thessaloniki (+4, =6, -3),
- In 1986, at second reserve board in the 27th Chess Olympiad in Dubai (+3, =4, -2),
- In 1988, at second reserve board in the 28th Chess Olympiad in Thessaloniki (+3, =1, -1),
- In 1990, at second reserve board in the 29th Chess Olympiad in Novi Sad (+2, =1, -2).

Raja Ravi Sekhar played for India in the Men's Asian Team Chess Championships:

- In 1977, at third board in the 2nd Asian Team Chess Championship in Auckland (+4, =1, -4),
- In 1981, at third board in the 4th Asian Team Chess Championship in Hangzhou (+3, =2, -2),
- In 1989, at fourth board in the 8th Asian Team Chess Championship in Genting Highlands (+1, =2, -1) and won team bronze medal.

In 1981, Ravi Sekhar was awarded the FIDE International Master (IM) title.

In 1986, he became a FIDE International Arbiter after successfully officiating the 1979 Asian Junior Chess Championship in Sivakasi and the 1983 National B Chess Championship in Agartala.

After 1993, he did not participate in FIDE-rated competitions. Ravi Sekhar has founded his own chess academy in Bangalore, where he works as a coach.

== Books ==
Ravi Sekhar has published 5 books after his retirement from competitive chess in '93.

- Basic Endgame Knowledge (1994), Chess Moves
- Indian Masters beat Grandmasters (1995), Chess Windows
- Indian Masters outplay Grandmasters (1996), Chess Windows
- Indian Masters outwit Grandmasters (1997), Chess Windows
- IMPORTANT Rook Endings (For the Tournament Player) (1999), Chess Windows

== Notable achievements and records ==
Year	Category	Event / Achievement	Record / Placement	Ref
1973	Player	Indian National Junior Championship	Winner (Flawless 7/7 perfect score)	
1974	Player	Indian National Junior Championship	Winner (Back-to-back title)	
1974	International	13th World Junior Chess Championship (Manila)	16th Place (Ended India's 12-year tournament drought)	
1975	Player	National Junior, National 'B', & National 'A'	Achieved the historic Indian "Triple Crown" within one calendar year	
1975–1990	Player	Indian National 'A' Championships	Played in 16 consecutive finals, consistently finishing in the top six	
1976	Player	Indian National 'A' Championship (Patna)	Winner (National Champion)	
1979	Player	Indian National 'A' Championship (Vijayawada)	Winner (Two-time National Champion)	
1979	Officiating	Asian Junior Chess Championship (Sivakasi)	Served as Chief Arbiter	
1980	International	24th Chess Olympiad (Valletta, Malta)	Served as the Official Team Captain and played Board 1	
1983	Officiating	National 'B' Chess Championship (Agartala)	Served as Chief Arbiter	
1986	Officiating	FIDE International Arbiter (IA) Title	Awarded Title by FIDE	
1988	International	28th Chess Olympiad (Thessaloniki, Greece)	Served as Team Captain and Manager; finished undefeated as player (+3, =1, -1)	

== Inventions and variants ==
In 1987, Raja Ravi Sekhar, in collaboration with several leading Indian chess players, created and developed "Maya Chess," a unique variant of the traditional game. The core gameplay dynamic relies on a concept known as "Maya power transference." Under the official rules published by the Maya Chess Federation of India (MCFI) in 1993, any piece on the board—excluding the king and pawns—that is actively supported by one or more friendly pieces loses its original movements and capabilities. Instead, it immediately acquires the movement patterns and powers of the supporting piece or pieces. This complex shift in piece identity occurs immediately and remains effective for as long as the state of tactical support exists, provided the supporting piece has already completed its first move of the game.

== 1988 Chess Olympiad leadership ==
Ravi Sekhar played a pivotal, multi-faceted leadership role for the Indian national team at the 28th Chess Olympiad held in Thessaloniki, Greece, in 1988. During the tournament, he took on a demanding "triple-hat" role, simultaneously serving as an active player, the team manager, and the head coach. He personally coordinated all logistics, accommodation, and scheduling for the squad, which featured a teenage Viswanathan Anand playing under his direct captaincy. Despite the intense administrative and coaching burdens, Ravi Sekhar excelled on the board, remaining undefeated across his six games as the team's second reserve player, finishing with three wins and three draws.

== Other interests ==
Outside of his professional chess career and coaching, Ravi Sekhar is an avid bibliophile with a deep interest in non-fiction literature, history, and philosophy. Alongside his analytical chess work, he has extensively studied and practiced astrology. He maintains a personal philosophy that rigorous intellectual engagement is vital throughout an individual's entire lifetime.
