= Manuel Aaron =

Indian chess player (born 1935)

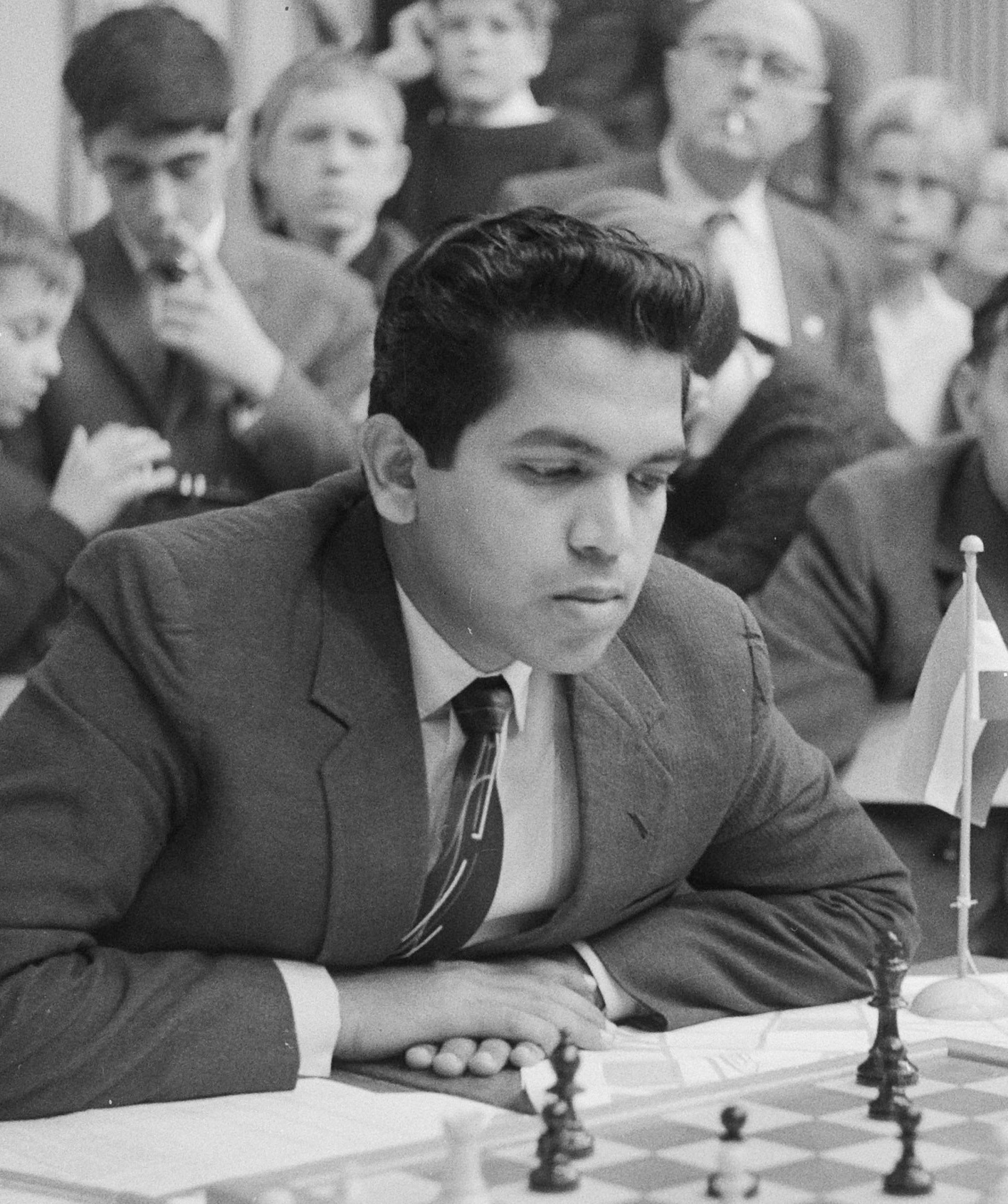
- Manuel Aaron in 1962

Personal information
- Born: 30 December 1935 (age 90) Toungoo, Myanmar

Chess career
- Country: India
- Title: International Master (1961)
- FIDE rating: 2315 [inactive]
- Peak rating: 2415 (January 1981)

Manuel Aaron (born 30 December 1935) is the first Indian chess master in the second half of the 20th century. He dominated chess in India in the 1960s to the 1980s, was the national champion of India nine times between 1959 and 1981. He is India's first chess player to be awarded the FIDE Title of International Master, and is one of the key figures in introducing international chess practices to India; until the 1960s, Indian chess (known as chaturanga) was often played using many local traditional variants (e.g. in lieu of castling, the king could execute a knights move once, if it had not been checked). Aaron helped popularize the international variety, forming many chess groups and urging players to study openings and other formal chess literature.

== Life ==
Aaron was born in December 1935 in Toungoo, British Burma, to parents from Thoothukudi who had relocated to escape poverty. The family returned to Madras in 1941, where Aaron spent much of his childhood moving among relatives alongside his siblings. He developed an interest in chess by observing his parents play and was largely self-taught.

He later completed a Bachelor of Science degree in Allahabad. As a student, he was unable to afford the ₹16 required for the 6th edition of Modern Chess Openings until his elder sister purchased it for him. Although his father was initially skeptical about chess providing a viable livelihood, Aaron's achievements in the sport eventually secured him employment at Indian Bank. During his time at Indian Bank, International Master Venkatachalam Saravanan was among his colleagues from 1990 to 1993. Saravanan noted Aaron's composure during matches, highlighting his ability to remain calm and unexpressive at the board even under severe time pressure. In January 1983, Aaron expanded into chess journalism by founding the magazine Chess Mate.

Aaron was Indian National Champion nine times (out of 14 championships between 1959 and 1981), including a run of five consecutive titles between 1969 and 1973. He also won the Tamil Nadu Chess Championship eleven times (1957–1982); after him, Tamil Nadu emerged as the chess powerhouse of India.

He won the West Asian Zonal against Mongolia's Sukien Momo 3–1 (earning his International Master's rating), and the Asian-Australian Zonal final against Cecil Purdy of Australia 3–0 in 1961. In 1962, he won the Arjuna Award for Indian sportsmen, the first-ever chess player to be so honoured.

These wins at the Asian level qualified him for the Stockholm Interzonal in 1962 and although finishing last (23rd place), he inflicted defeats on grandmasters Lajos Portisch and Wolfgang Uhlmann.

Aaron also played thrice with the Indian team at the Chess Olympiads. He captained the Indian team at Leipzig 1960 (+2 –10 =8) including a win over Max Euwe, and at Varna 1962 (+7 –6 =4), including another victory over Lajos Portisch. In 1964, he played at second board in Tel Aviv (+4 –7 =6). He also led India to the 2nd Asian Team Championship at Auckland in 1977 and to the 4th Asian Team championship at Hangzhou in China in 1981. He finished fourth in the Commonwealth Championship at Hong Kong 1984. The event was won by Kevin Spraggett and Murray Chandler.

He is the author of Dubai Olympiad 1986 and a journalist for The Hindu newspaper. His son, Arvind, is also a well known journalist.

=== Contributions to Indian chess culture ===
In 1972, Aaron founded the Tal Chess Club at the Soviet Cultural Centre in Chennai, utilizing chess books, clocks, and equipment sent directly from Moscow. He translated instructional chess literature from Russian, German, and French to train players at the club, which a seven-year-old Viswanathan Anand joined in 1976. Having emerged in an environment with a minimal chess culture, Aaron was very sensitive to the growth of chess awareness in India. He did much to further chess as the Secretary of the Tamil Nadu Chess Association (1977 and 1997) and also as chairman of the All India Chess Federation. It was 17 years before India had its second International Master, V. Ravikumar (1978), and it had its first grandmaster (Viswanathan Anand) only in 1988.

At the time of the 2013 World Championship match in Chennai, Manuel Aaron was still active in Indian chess circles.

== Notable games ==
- Manuel Aaron vs Max Euwe, Leipzig ol (Men) qual-B 1960, Indian Game: Capablanca Variation (A47), 1–0
- Lajos Portisch vs Manuel Aaron, Varna 1962, King's Indian Defense: Fianchetto Variation, Classical Main Line (E69), 0-1
- Wolfgang Uhlmann vs Manuel Aaron, Stockholm izt 1962, King's Indian Defense: Fianchetto Variation, Classical Main Line (E69), 0-1
