= Vasanti Khadilkar =

Indian chess player (born 1961)

Vasanti Khadilkar Unni
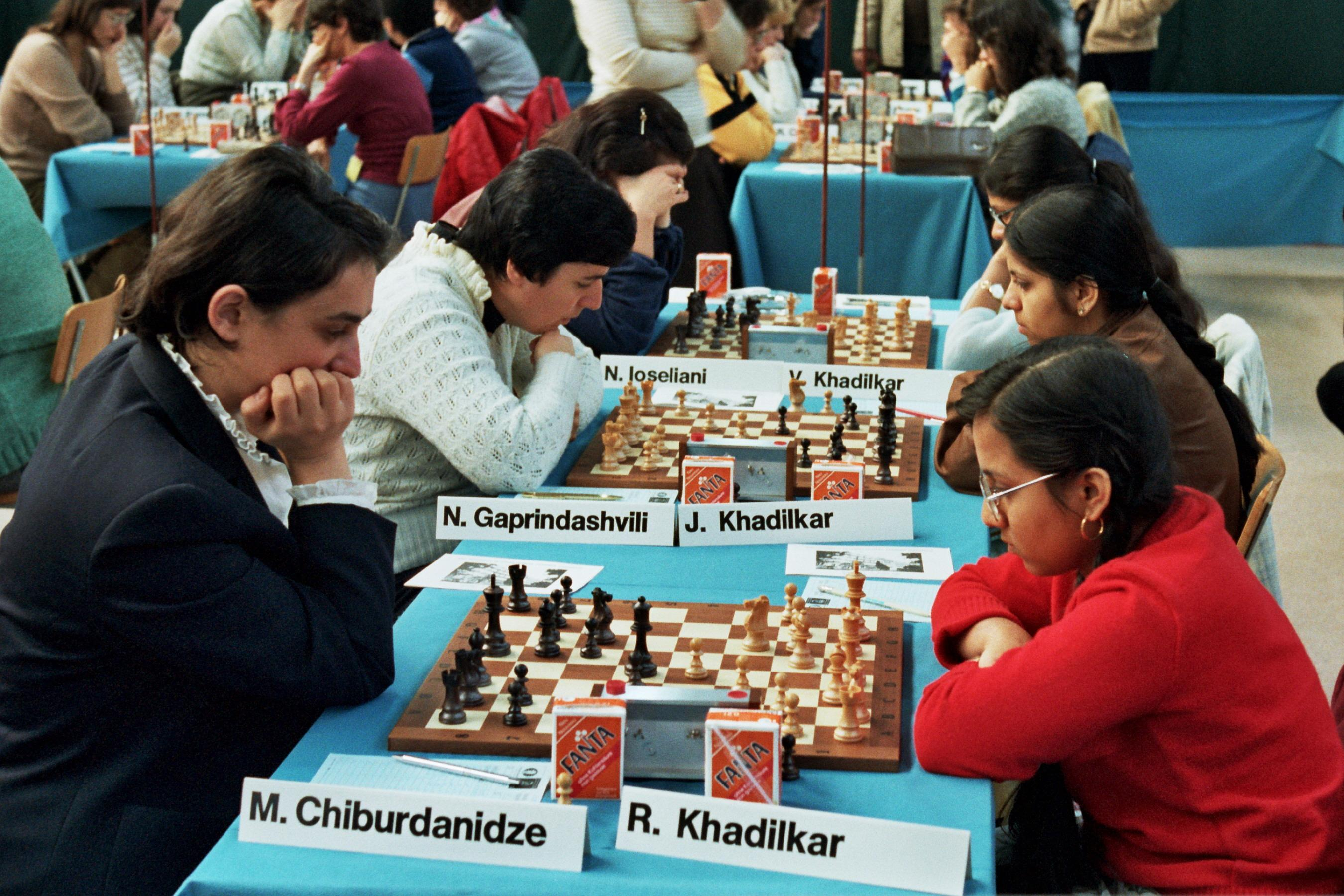

Personal information
- Born: 1 April 1961 (age 65)

Chess career
- Country: India
- Title: Woman International Master (1985)
- FIDE rating: 2120 [inactive]
- Peak rating: 2135 (January 1990)

Vasanti Khadilkar Unni (Marathi: वासंती खाडिलकर उन्नी; born 1 April 1961) is an Indian chess player holding the title of Woman International Master (WIM). She won in 1974 the inaugural Indian Women's Championship.

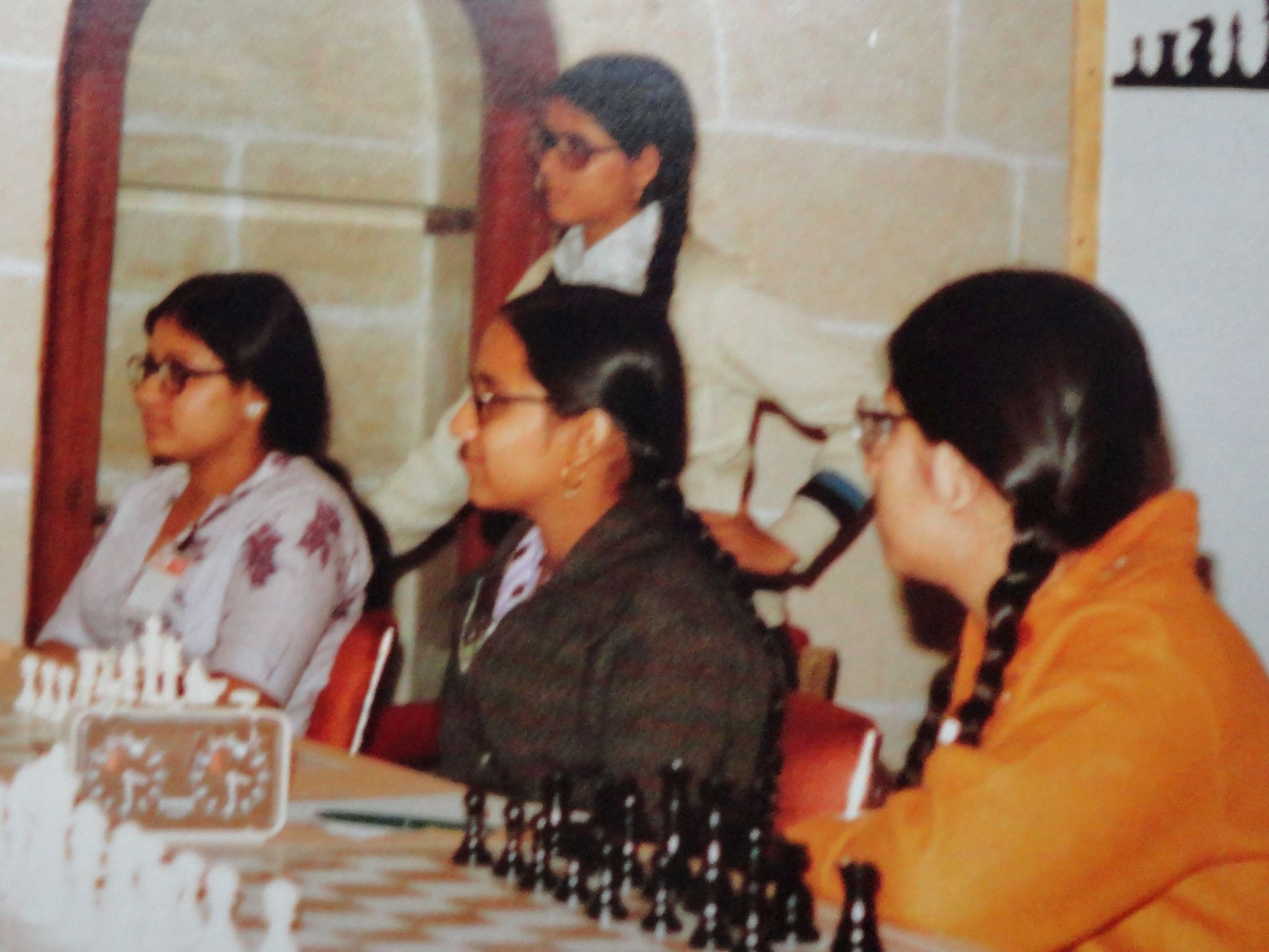
The Khaldikar sisters at Valletta, Chess Olympiad 1980

The three Khadilkar sisters, Jayshree, Vasanti, and Rohini, dominated the Indian women's chess championships, winning all the titles in its first decade.

In 1984 Vasanti jointly won the British Ladies' Championship with Bhagyashree Sathe in Brighton.
