= Bhagyashree Thipsay =

Indian chess player (born 1961)

Personal information
- Born: 4 August 1961 (age 64) Mumbai, India
- Spouse: Pravin Thipsay

Chess career
- Country: India
- Title: Woman International Master (1987)
- Peak rating: 2335 (July 1999)

Bhagyashree Thipsay (née Sathe; born 4 August 1961) is an Indian chess player holding the title of Woman International Master (WIM). She won five times the Indian Women's Championship (1985, 1986, 1988, 1991 and 1994) and the Asian Women's Championship in 1991. In 1984 she was joint winner with Vasanti Unni of the British Ladies' Championship. She competed in the Women's World Chess Championship 2000, losing in the first round to Peng Zhaoqin.

She is recipient of Padma Shri and Arjuna award. After marriage to the chess Grandmaster Praveen Thipsay she changed her name to Bhagyashree Sathe Thipsay. She works for IDBI as an officer in Mumbai.
