= Surya Shekhar Ganguly =

Indian chess grandmaster (born 1983)

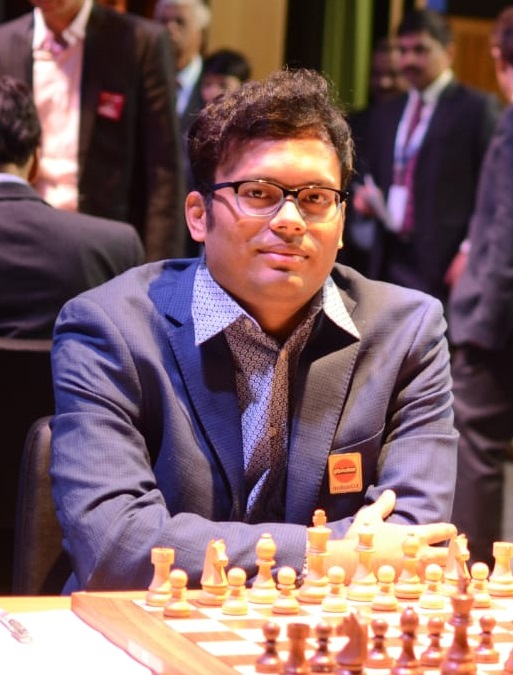
- Ganguly at Tata Steel Chess, Kolkata, 2018

Personal information
- Born: 24 February 1983 (age 43) Kolkata, India

Chess career
- Country: India
- Title: Grandmaster (2003)
- FIDE rating: 2578 (July 2026)
- Peak rating: 2676 (July 2016)
- Peak ranking: No. 55 (March 2010)

Surya Shekhar Ganguly (born 24 February 1983) is an Indian chess grandmaster. His peak ELO rating was 2676 (July 2016). Ganguly became an International Master at the age of 16 and a grandmaster at the age of 19.

He has won 40 individual gold, 21 individual silver and 6 individual bronze medals in National as well as International tournaments. He was also the captain of the Indian team in the Asian Nations Online Cup 2020 which won the 2nd place. In addition, in team competitions he has won 12 gold, four silver and three bronze medals. Some of his recent achievements are winning individual gold in Hunan International Open (2019), individual gold in World Team Championship in Astana, Kazakhstan (2019), gold in National Team Championship Kolkata (2019), bronze in Binhai International Open, China (2018) and bronze in Asian Team Championship in both Classical and Rapid in Iran (2018).

The government of India has awarded him the prestigious Arjuna Award in 2005 for his outstanding achievement in sports. He was awarded ″Bangabhusan″, the second-highest civilian award of West Bengal, in 2015. He was also awarded the "Khel Samman" award in 2013 from the Government of West Bengal and the "Shera Bangali" award in 2009 as the best Sportsperson of Bengal.

He was six-time National champion (2003–2008) and Asian champion in 2009. He worked in the team of seconds that assisted Viswanathan Anand in winning the World Championship matches against Vladimir Kramnik, Veselin Topalov and Boris Gelfand in 2008, 2010 and 2012, respectively.

In 2024, a film inspired from his life named Dabaru was released. The director of the film is Pathikrit Basu.

== Achievements ==
Ganguly has played numerous individual and team tournaments, both national and international. He has won total 40 individual gold, 21 individual silver and 6 individual bronze medals in National as well as International tournaments and as a member of team he has won 12 gold, 4 silver and 3 bronze medals. He achieved his IM (International Master) title at Goodricke International, Kolkata 2000 and the GM (Grand Master) title at the 35th Chess Olympiad, Bled 2002. Some of his notable achievements are given here.

=== National events ===
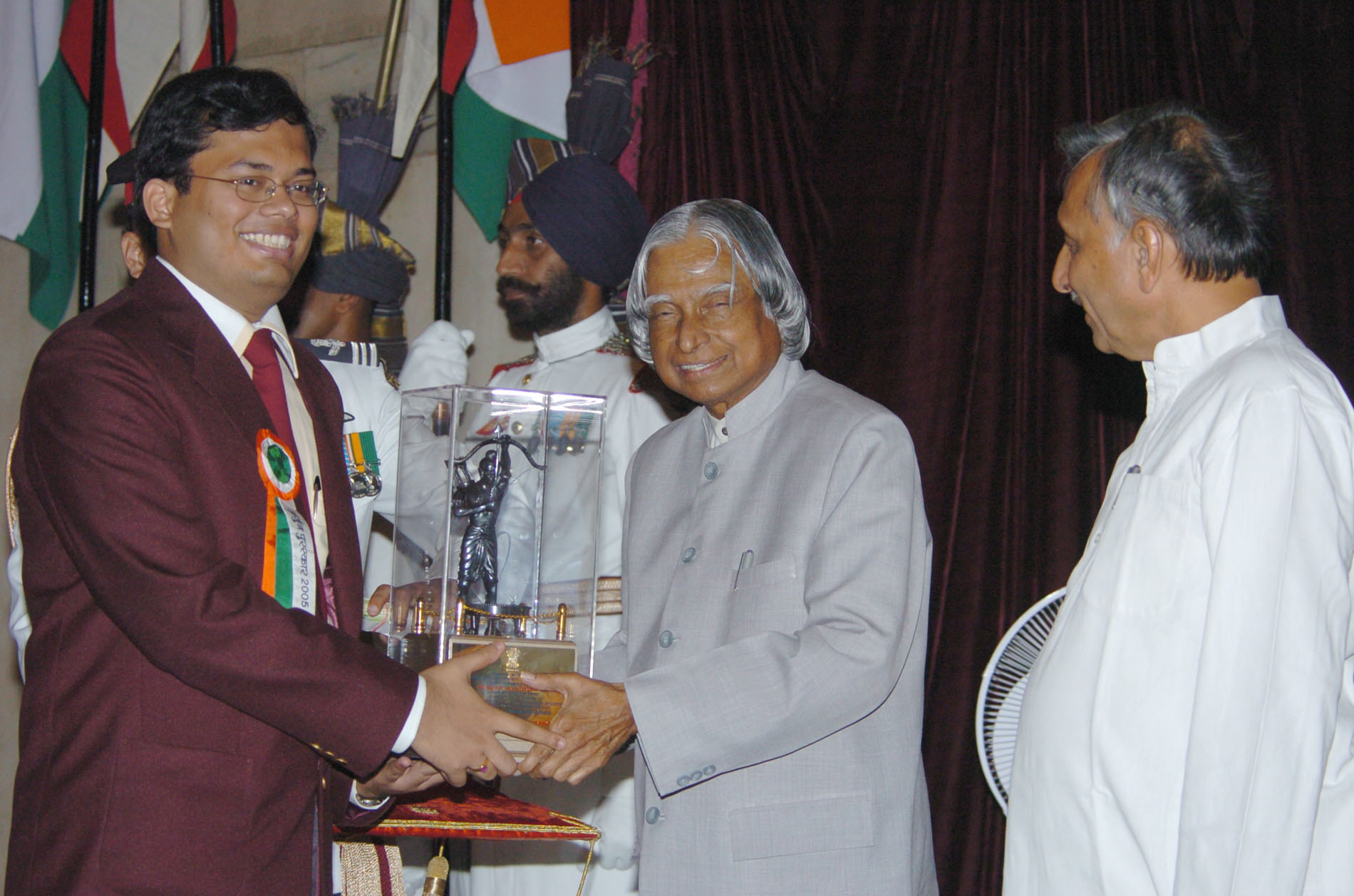
The President Dr. A.P.J. Abdul Kalam presenting the Arjuna Award -2005 to Shri Surya Shekhar Ganguly for Chess, at a glittering function in New Delhi on August 29, 2006

In addition to the National U10 and U12 championships mentioned above, Ganguly's achievements in other national events are:

- National Cities 1999: His team won the championship.
- National "B" 1999: Ganguly won this championship at the age of 16.
- National Junior 1999/2000: Champion
- National "A": He won the Indian National Championship for a record six consecutive times from 2003 to 2008.
- National Team: His team won the championship in 2001, 2002 and 2007
- Gold in National 'A' 2003
- National Rapid 2005: Champion
- Gold in National Team 2007
- Gold in 45th National 'A' 2008
- Gold in 46th National 'A' 2008
- Gold in National Team Championship, Kanpur, 2014
- Gold in National Team Championship, Goa, 2015
- Gold in National Team Championship Bhubaneswar, 2017
- Gold in National Team Championship Kolkata, 2018
- Gold in National Team 2019

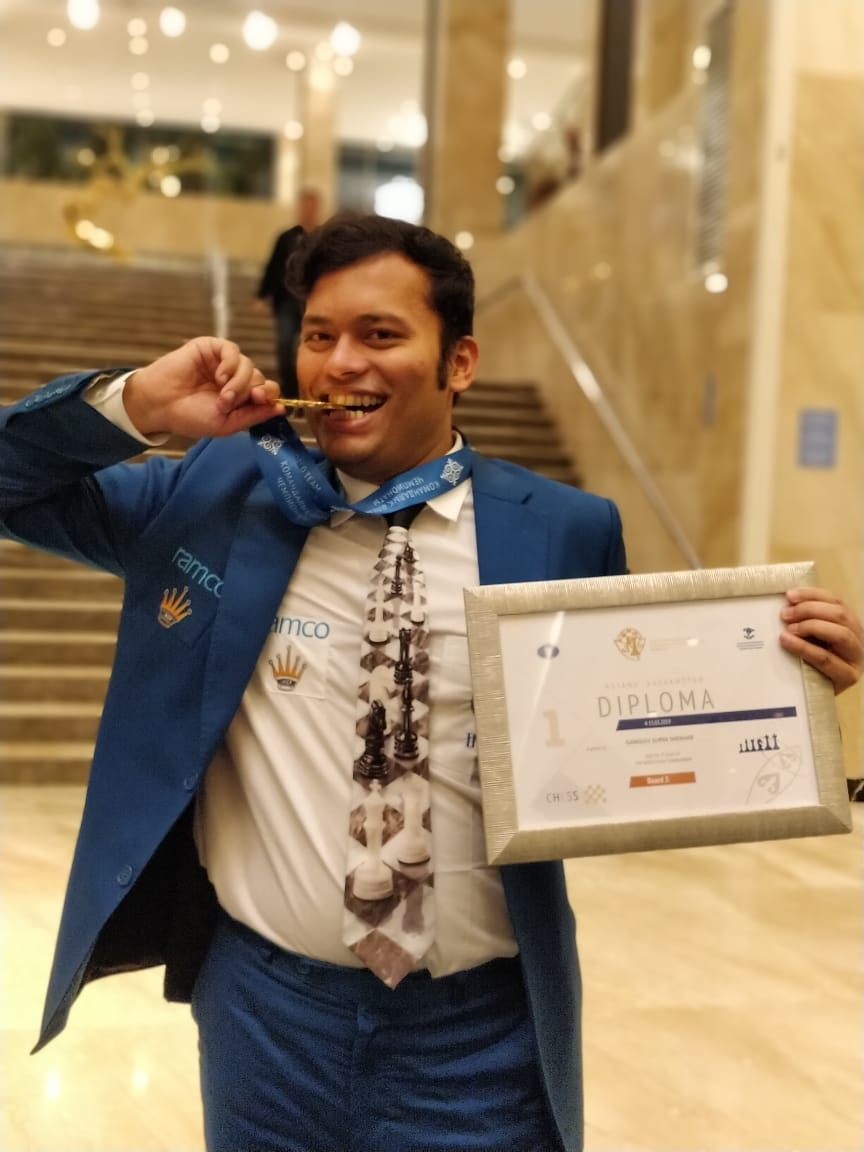
at World Team Chess

=== Asian events ===
- Bronze in Asian Continental Championship, 2001
- Asian Zonal: silver in 2001, gold in 2003 and 2007.
- Asian Team Chess Championship: his team India won silver in 2003, 2007 and 2008, gold in 2005 (also an individual gold) and 2009.
- Asian Indoor Games 2007: two silver medals and a gold medal.
- Gold medal in Asian Continental Championship, 2009
- Asian Games 2010: played for bronze medal-winning Indian team, scoring +4=4-0 (four wins, four draws, no losses)
- Silver in Asian Continental Championship, 2015 (tied for first with Salem A. R. Saleh, placing second on tiebreak).
- Asian Indoor Games Bronze medal. Turkmenistan, 2017.
- 4th in Asian Championship, Philippines, 2018
- Bronze in Asian Team Championship Classical, 2018
- Bronze in Asian Team Championship Rapid: Iran, 2018

=== Olympiads and World Team ===
- Individual Gold medal in World Team Championship in Astana, Kazakhstan, 2019
- Olympiads: He has represented India at six Chess Olympiads (2000, 2002, 2004, 2006, 2008, 2010). He won his GM title at the 35th Olympiad in Slovenia 2002 and his team India got the 6th position at the 36th Olympiad in Spain 2004.
- World Team Chess Championship 2010: His team India won bronze and he won the individual gold for himself.

=== Other international tournaments ===
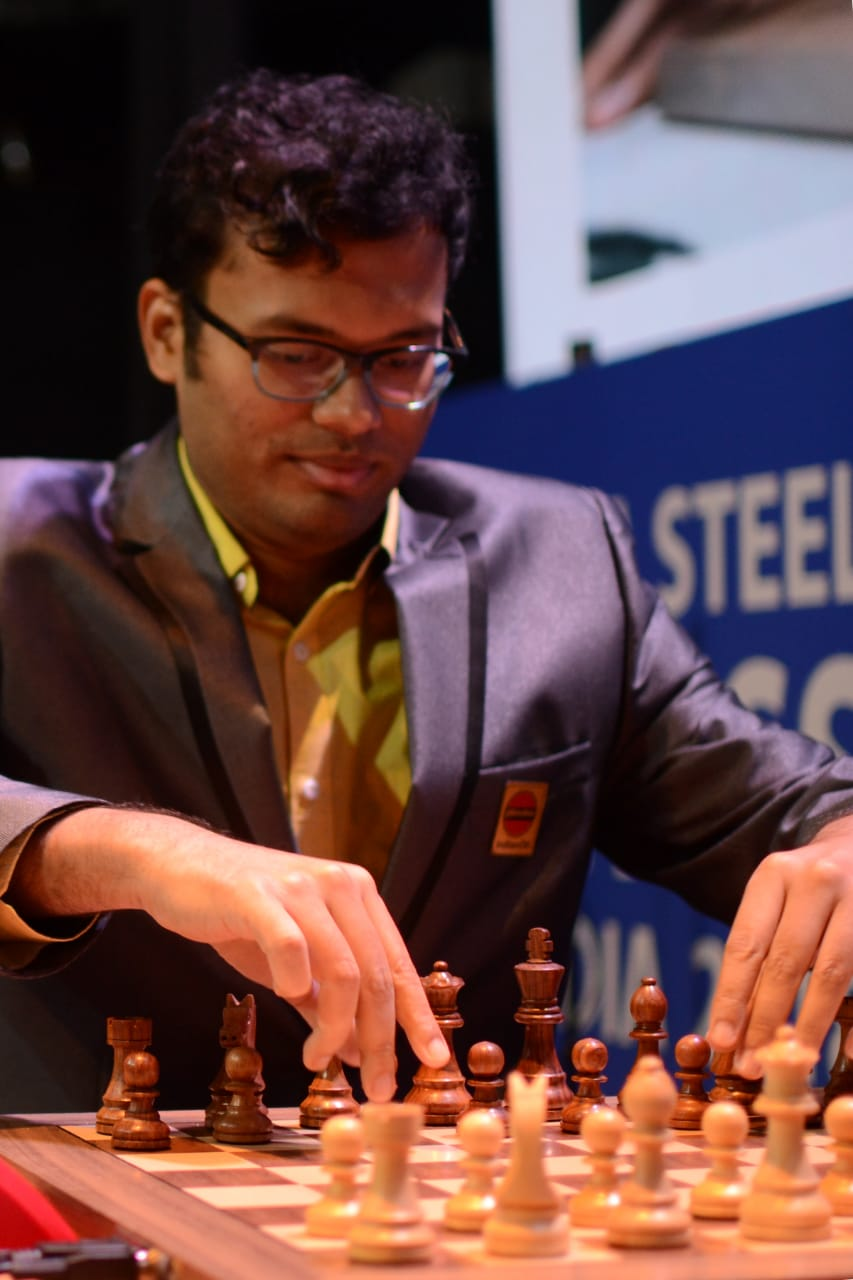

- Goodricke International 2000: Won IM title
- World Junior 2002: Bronze
- Gibtel International 2004: Second
- Delhi International 2004: Joint Champion
- Kolkata Open 2004: Joint Champion
- Amsterdam International 2004: Second
- Bangladesh International 2005: Champion
- ONGC International 2006: Champion
- Commonwealth Open: After winning Gold (Junior) in 2000 and 2003/2004, he went on to win Silver in the Open in 2007 and 2008.
- Sydney International 2008: Champion
- Canberra International 2008: Second
- Parsvanath International: After winning silver in 2008, he won gold in the tournament in 2009.
- Indonesia Open Chess Championship 2011: Joint winner with Li Chao, ahead of Wang Yue, Dreev, Tkachiev and others.
- Fujairah INT Masters Tournament 2012: Won this strong Open tournament in UAE ahead of 30 GM's, including several 2700+ players such as Jobava, Le Quang, Bacrot and Moiseenko.
- LIC 2nd International Grand Masters Chess Tournament 2015: Won this tournament in Kolkata, India ahead of Nigel Short and 25 other GM's.
- Member of the winning team of the Spanish League 2015, Solvay, along with teammates Pentala Harikrishna, Baskaran Adhiban, Aleksander Delchev, Sergio Cacho Reigadas, Jesús de la Villa, and Elizbar Ubilava.
- 2015 Edmonton International: Equal second with Ivanchuk and Wang Hao behind the winner Harikrishna.
- 2015 Thai Open Chess Championship: Equal first with Nigel Short and Gragun Kamil ahead of Wang Hao, Vallejo Pons etc.
- O2C Doeberl Cup 2015 Premier: Equal second with Johansen behind Zhou Weiki but ahead of Van Wely etc.
- 25th Keres Memorial 2016: Equal second with Gelfand and Howell behind Kovalenko but ahead of Svidler, Vitiugov, Matlakov, Eljanov etc.
- 11th Edmonton International-Main 2016: Equal first with Shankland, ahead of Shirov, Sethuraman etc.
- 16th Bangkok Chess Club Open 2016: Won ahead of Vallejo Pons, Nigel Short, Loek van Wely, etc.
- 2016 O2C Doeberl Cup Premier: Second ahead of Hrant Melkumyan on tie-break.
- 2017 O2C Doeberl Cup Premier: Won with a score of 8/9 ahead of Krasenkow, Zhao Zong-Yuan etc.
- Bronze in Binhai International Open, China, 2018
- Champion in Hunan International Open, China, 2019
- Silver in Dortmund Chess Open, Germany, 2025

== Early career ==
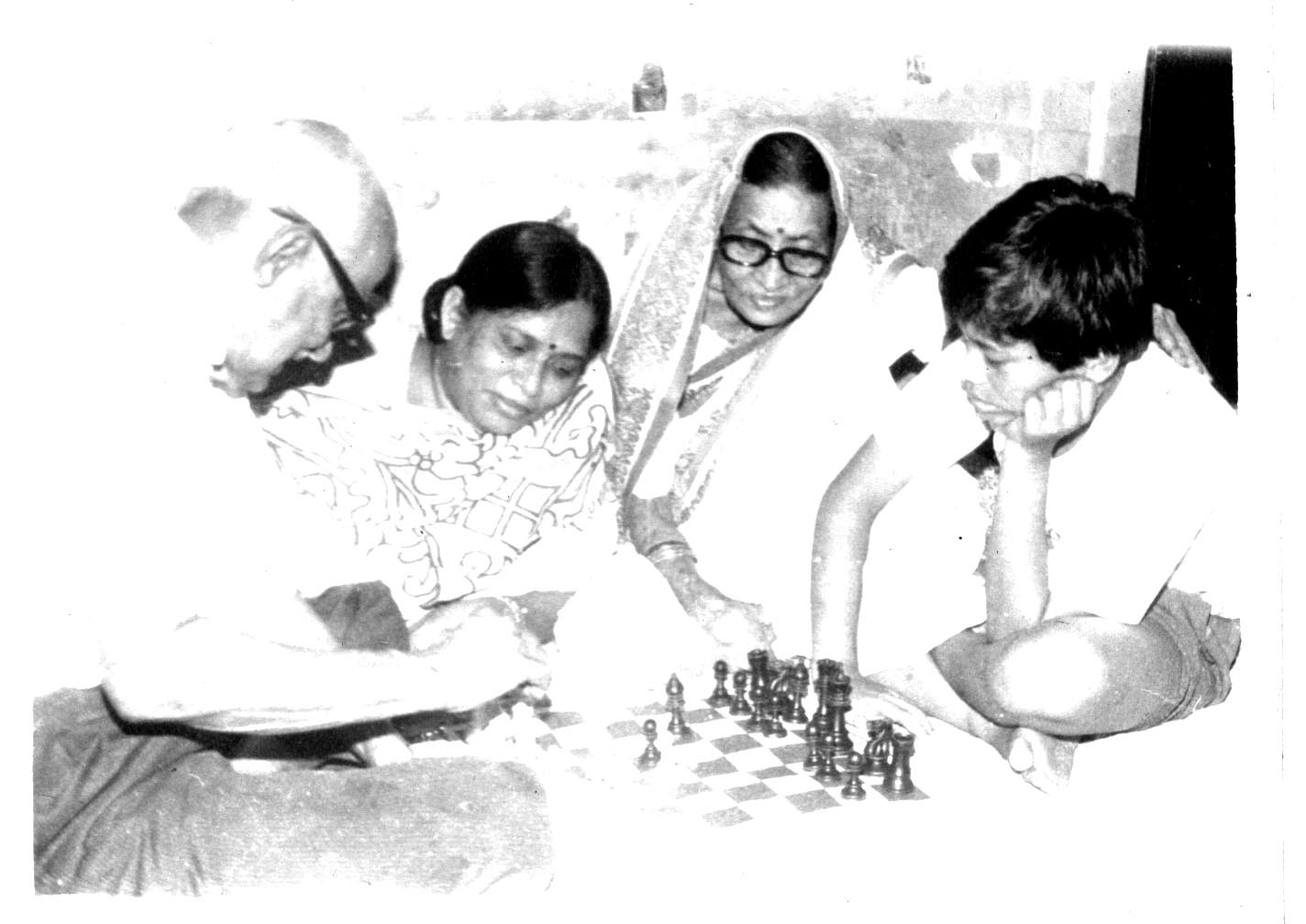
Childhood photo

Ganguly was born 24 February 1983 in Kolkata. His grandfather, the late Anil Basumallick, taught him chess at the age of 5. Soon he became very popular in chess circles of Kolkata as he was the youngest player in most tournaments taking place during those days and also won prizes. In 1991, at the age of 8, he won both the Indian National U-10 and U-12 Championships. He won these Championships again in 1992 and 1995.

The following are his achievements in the World Youth Chess Championship in his age categories:

- World U-10 Championship, Warsaw 1991: Won bronze medal in his first foreign trip, at the age of 8.
- World U-10 Championship, Duisburg 1992: He was leading ahead of future stars such as Grischuk, Bacrot and Vallejo Pons, only to falter in the last two rounds to finish 6th.
- World U-10 Championship, Bratislava 1993: Shared bronze medal with Jakovenko, ahead of Grishchuk.
- World U-12 Championship, Szeged 1994: Shared bronze medal with Ponomariev, Vallejo Pons behind Levon Aronian and Bacrot, and ahead of Grishchuk.
- World U-12 Championship, St. Lorenzo 1995: Won silver medal behind Bacrot.

In 1995, at the age of 11, he beat a Grandmaster, the youngest player ever to do so until that time.

== Team Anand ==
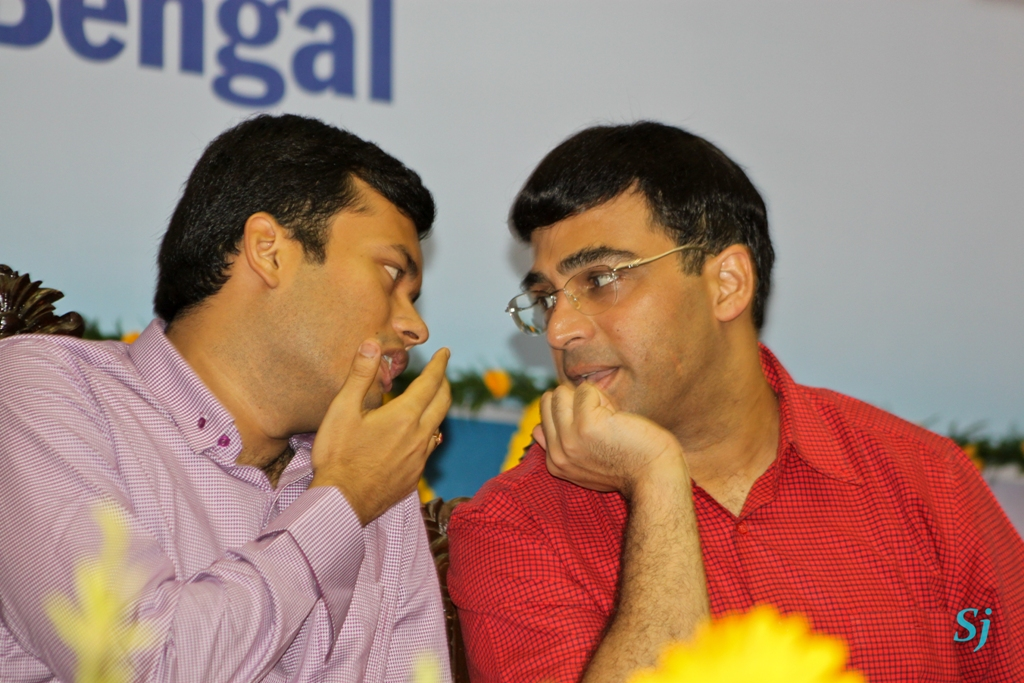

Ganguly has been a member of the team of seconds that helped Anand win his World title matches against Kramnik, Topalov and Gelfand in 2008, 2010 and 2012, respectively. Other members of the team were GM Peter Heine Nielsen, GM Radosław Wojtaszek and the former FIDE World Champion GM Rustam Kasimdzhanov.

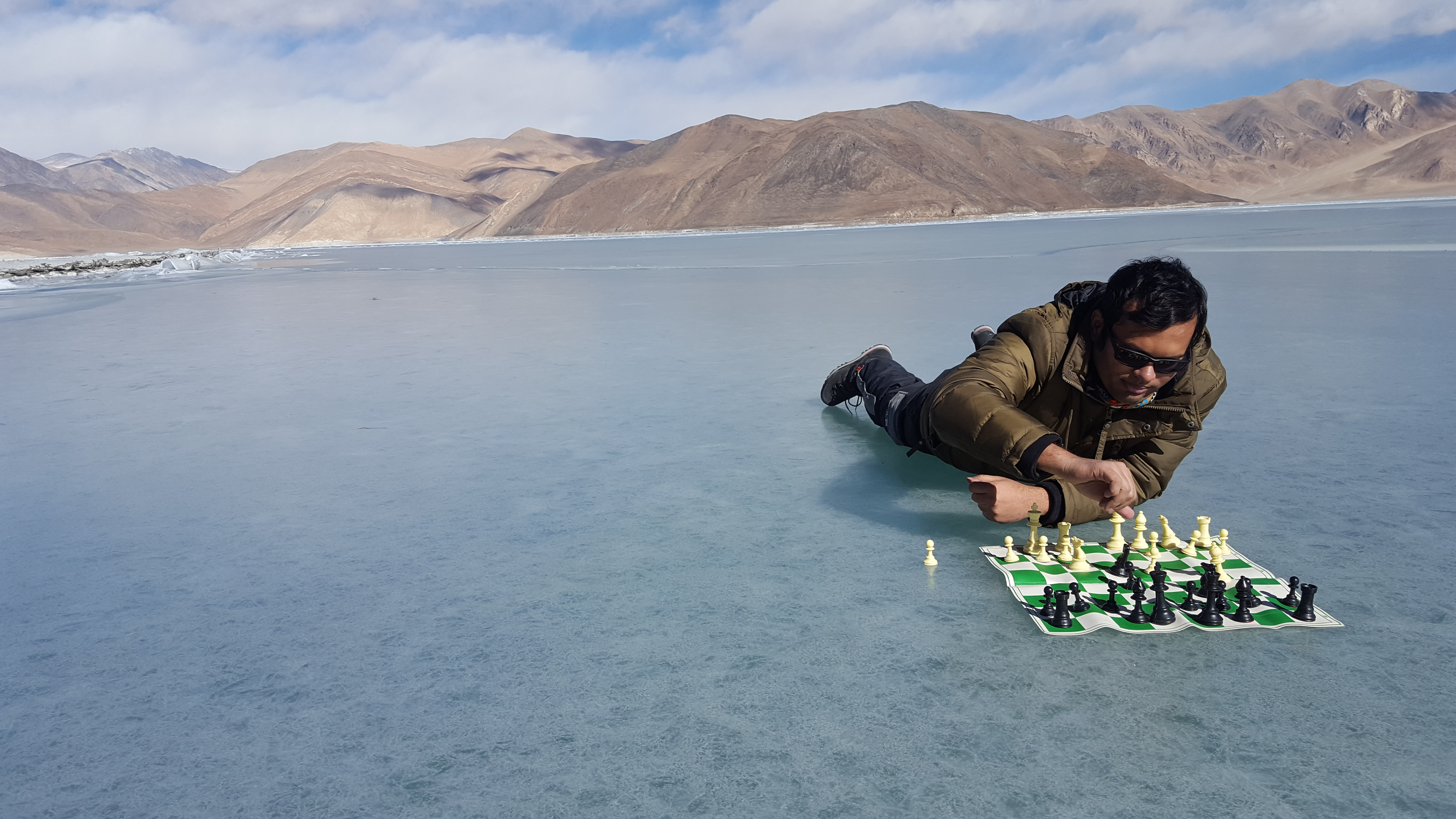
At Ladakh

Anand has praised Ganguly for being very effective as a team member. About Ganguly, he says, "He is a very good chess player and analyst who works really hard. We (have worked) together for six–seven years and will work together for a long time. Why change formula when it's working."

== Personal life ==
He was born to Pankaj Ganguly and Aarti Ganguly on 24 February 1983. He has an elder sister who is a doctor. He is working as Senior Manager at the Indian Oil Corporation. He married Sudeshna Dutta, a doctor in biotechnology, in 2011. They have two children - a daughter and a son.

== Notable games ==
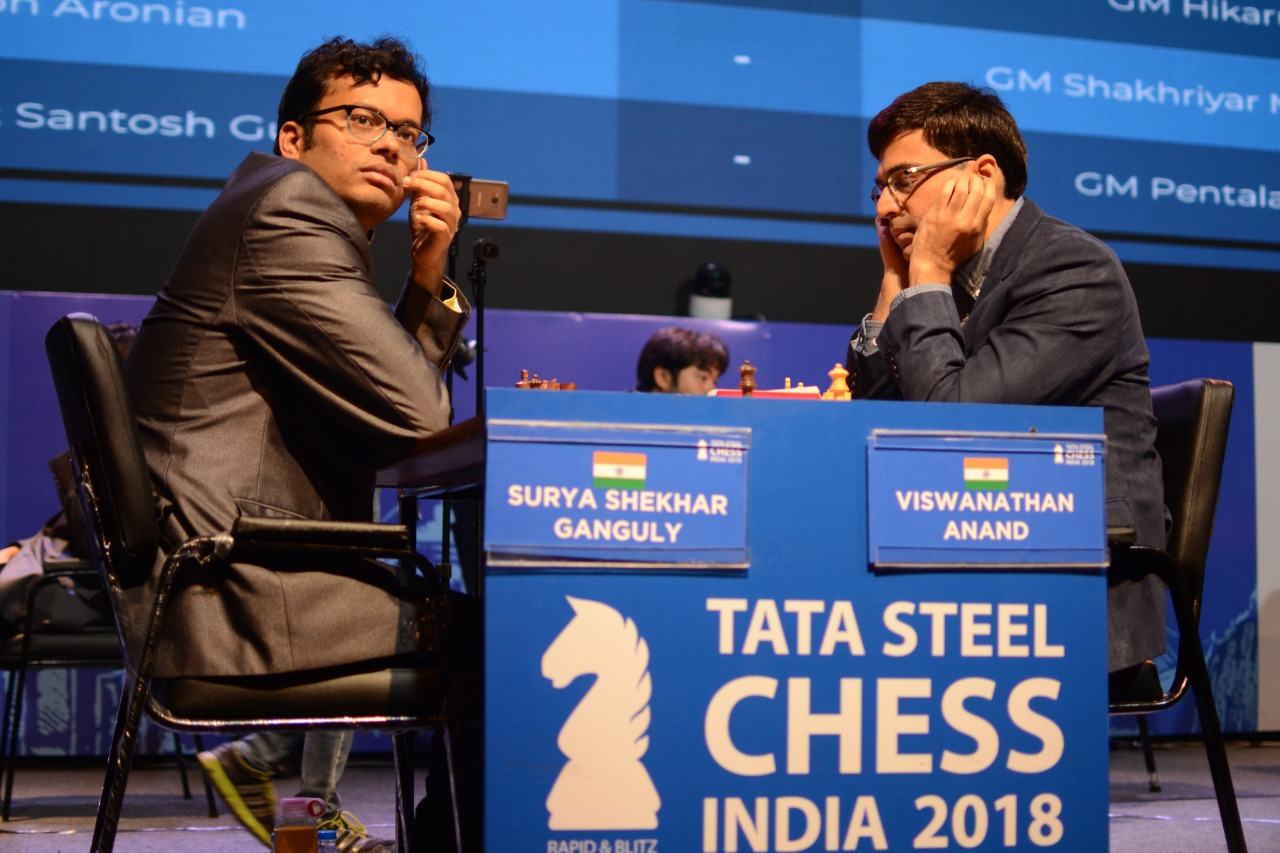

- Anand vs Ganguly
- Yu Yangi vs Ganguly
- Mareco Sandro vs Ganguly
- Carlsen vs Ganguly
- Ganguly vs Svidler

== Sample game ==
Ganguly vs. Shirov, Edmonton 2016

Position: b8 black rook, c8 black bishop, f8 black rook, h8 black king, g7 black pawn, h7 black pawn, d6 white pawn, g6 black queen, h6 black bishop, a5 black pawn, b5 white pawn, d5 white queen, e5 white rook, g4 white pawn, h4 white pawn, c3 white knight, b2 white pawn, e2 white bishop, e1 white king, h1 white rook

The position after 28...Bc8.

The following game is from 11th Edmonton International Tournament 2016, a 10-player round robin event. Ganguly (White) was paired against Alexei Shirov (Black) in the last round. It was a must-win situation for both players, Ganguly to finish equal first with Shankland and Shirov to finish equal second with Ganguly.

1.e4 c5 2.Nf3 Nc6 3.d4 cxd4 4.Nxd4 Nf6 5.Nc3 e5 6.Ndb5 d6 7.Bg5 a6 8.Na3 b5 9.Nd5 Be7 10.Bxf6 Bxf6 11.c3 Bg5 12.Nc2 Rb8 13.a4 bxa4 14.Ncb4 Nxb4 15.cxb4 0-0 16.Rxa4 a5 17.h4 Bh6 18.b5 Bd7 19.Nc3 d5 20.exd5 e4 21.Be2 f5 22.d6 Kh8 23.g3 f4 24.Rxe4 Bf5 25.Re5 Qf6 26.Qd5 fxg3 27.fxg3 Qg6 28.g4 Bc8 (Diagram)

29.Ne4!! Following Gelfand's teaching that it is not important how quickly you win but it's more important how safely you win. (Boris Gelfand: Positional Decision Making in Chess, Quality Chess UK, 2016). The computer says 29.Qd4 is the fastest route but Ganguly trusts Gelfand. Bb7 30.h5 Qxe4 31.Qxe4 Bxe4 32.Rxe4 Rfd8 33.Rd4 Finally, all complications are over and White is two pawns up. While calculating 29.Ne4 Ganguly had to just make sure that he didn't lose his vital 'd6' pawn that restricts Black's activity. Bc1 34.d7 This is again the safest way as it totally restricts Black. Bxb2 35.Rd5 Rb7 36.0-0 g6 37.h6 Ba3 38.Rf7 a4 39.Re5 Rbb8 40.Bc4 Bf8 41.Kg2 a3 42.Ba2 Bd6 43.Re6 Bf8 44.b6 White will play b7 when Black will be able to move nothing but his bishop. Shirov decided not to continue any further. 1-0
