= P. Iniyan =

Indian chess grandmaster (born 2002)

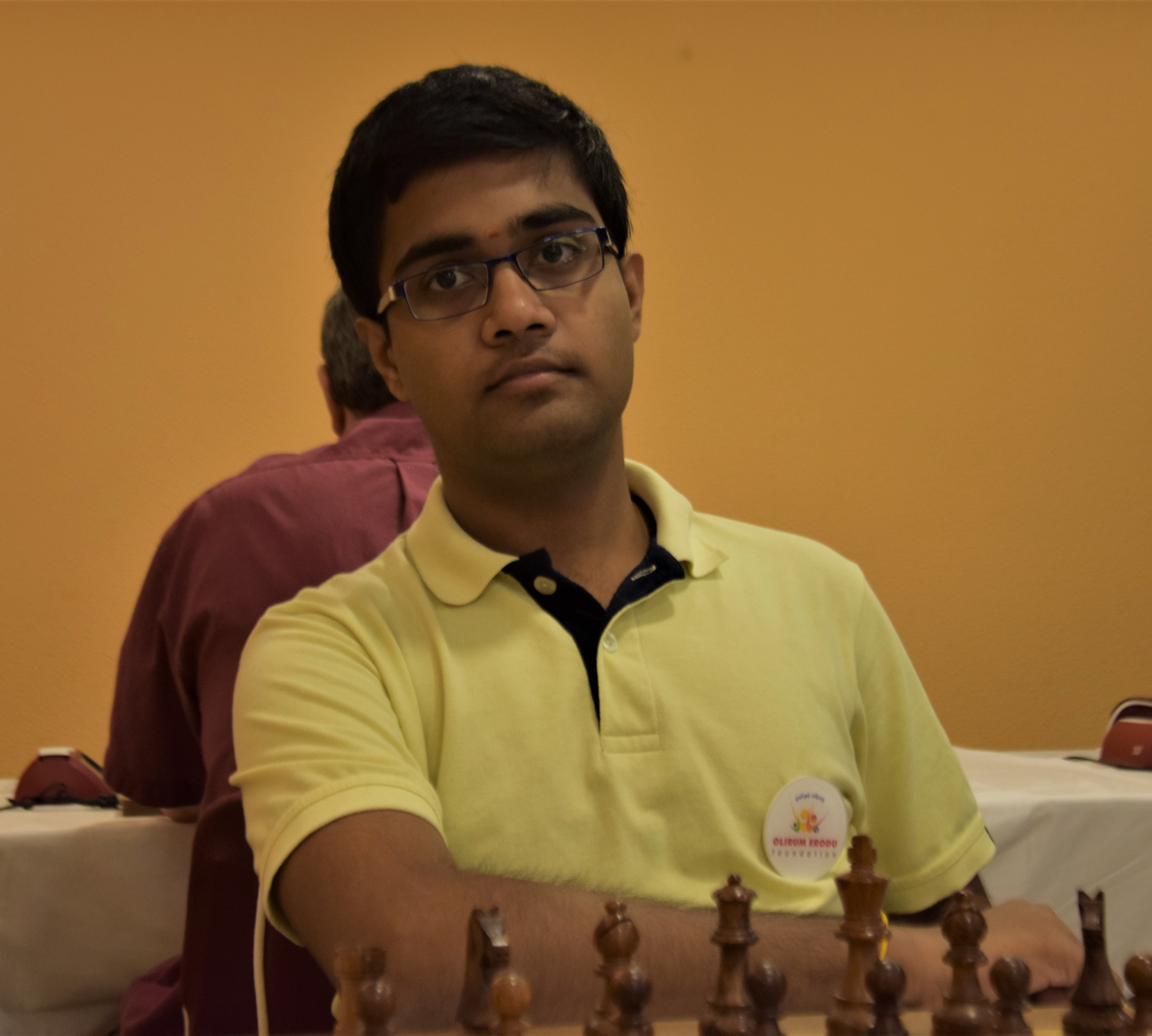
- Iniyan at the 2017 Andorra open

Personal information
- Born: Panneerselvam Iniyan; 13 September 2002 (age 23) Erode, Tamil Nadu, India

Chess career
- Country: India
- Title: Grandmaster (2019)
- FIDE rating: 2609 (August 2026)
- Peak rating: 2609 (August 2026)

Panneerselvam Iniyan (Tamil: பன்னீர்செல்வம் இனியன், born 13 September 2002) is an Indian chess professional player. He is India's 61st player to be awarded the title of Grandmaster by FIDE. He won the Indian Chess Championship in 2025.

== Career ==
He achieved the first GM norm in June 2017 at the "Ciutat de Montcada" open, the second in February 2018 at the Böblingen open, the third in July 2018 at the Barberà del Vallès open.

Other results were a 4th place at the Andorra open in 2017; 2nd after Richard Rapport in the Coppa Vergani at Villorba (Italy) in January 2018.

In April 2019, he placed equal 1st-8th at the Dubai Open with 7/9 (Maxim Matlakov won the event on tiebreak).

In July 2019, he won the Commonwealth Championship U18 at New Delhi with 7/7; in the same month, he was second at the Thailand Chess Festival of Pattaya.

In February 2025, he placed equal 1st-2nd at the Cappelle-la-Grande Open with 7½/9 (French IM Mahel Boyer won the event on tiebreak).

In March 2025, he won the Cannes Chess Open with 7½/9 ahead of IM Aradhya Garg & Kazybek Nogerbek.

In July 2025, he placed equal 1st-2nd at the Dole Open with 7½/9 along with Jan Malek. He won the event after blitz tiebreaks.

In October 2025, he won the National championship on tiebreak, tying with IM Goutham Krishna H with 9/11.
