= Rohini Khadilkar =

Indian chess player (born 1963)

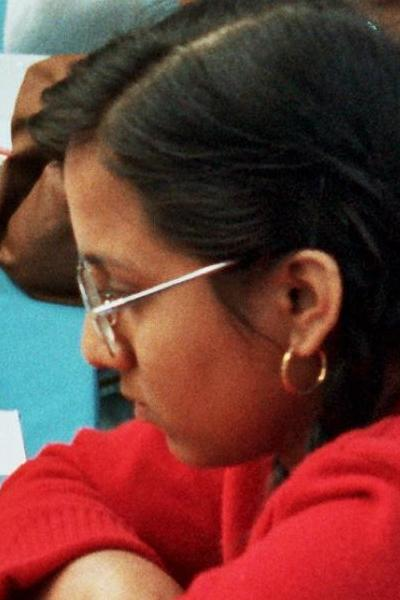
- Rohini Khadilkar, Luzern 1982

Personal information
- Born: 1 April 1963 (age 63) Mumbai, Maharashtra, India

Chess career
- Country: India
- Title: Woman International Master (1981)
- FIDE rating: 2215 [inactive]
- Peak rating: 2220 (July 1987)

Rohini Khadilkar (born 1 April 1963 in Mumbai) is a chess player holding the title of Woman International Master (WIM). She has won the Indian women's championship five times and the Asian women's championship twice. She was the first female chess player to compete in the Indian Chess Championship in 1976, and the first to receive the Arjuna Award in 1980.

She is the youngest of the three Khadilkar sisters - named Vasanti, Jayashri, and Rohini - all of whom excelled at chess. Their father, Nilkanth Khadilkar (1934–2019), was a famous journalist in Marathi language based near Mumbai, and all three sisters were helping run the newspaper 'Nava Kal' founded by their father at the time of his death. The family's association with literature goes all the way back to Marathi playwright Krishnaji Prabhakar Khadilkar (1872–1948), who was the great-grandfather to the sisters.

== Chess career ==
=== Women's competitions ===
Khadilkar became national women's chess champion in 1976 at the age of 13 and was the first to win that championship in three consecutive years. She has held the title on five occasions:

- November 1976, at Kottayam, Kerala
- December 1977, at Hyderabad
- March 1979, at Madras
- February 1981, at New Delhi
- December 1983, at New Delhi.

In 1981, Khadilkar also became the Asian women's chess champion when the competition was held at Hyderabad. She was unbeaten in that competition and scored 11.5 out of a possible 12 points. In the same year, she became a Woman International Master and in November 1983, she again won the Asian women's title when the competition was held at Kuala Lumpur, Malaysia.

=== Open competitions ===
In 1977 Khadilkar became the first female player to compete in the Indian Chess Championship. Some players objected to her being in the tournament because she was female. Her father wrote to the World Chess Federation president, Max Euwe, and Euwe ruled that female players could not be barred from open chess events.

=== Other competitions ===
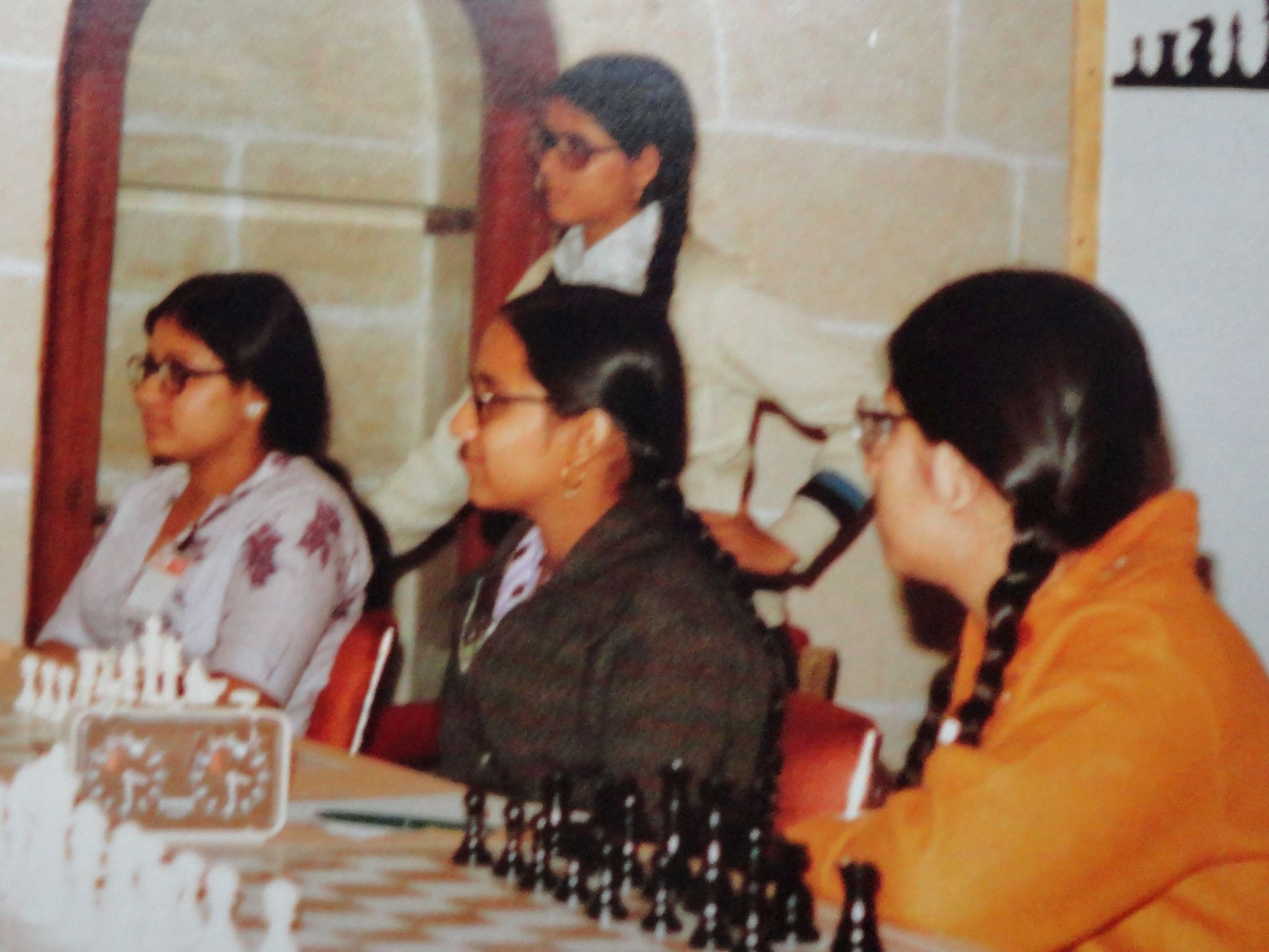
The Khaldikar sisters at Valletta, Chess Olympiad 1980

Khadilkar participated in the Chess Olympiad in Buenos Aires (1978), Valletta (1980), Lucerne (1982), Thessaloniki (1984), and Dubai (1986).

Khadilkar won the Zonal Championships twice, in Dubai and Malaysia, and became the World No.8 player. She was also the first Asian player to beat a chess computer, in London in 1989.

On one occasion, she played 113 opponents simultaneously, winning 111 of the games and drawing two.

=== Chess Ambassador ===
Rohini has travelled abroad to represent India on 56 occasions, visiting numerous countries. On each occasion, she was sponsored by the Government of India as a Chess Ambassador. Her visits included trips to the then-Communist countries of Poland, USSR and Yugoslavia, which were encouraged by Indira Gandhi, the prime minister at that time.

== Newspaper career ==
In 1993, Rohini retired from chess and enrolled as a student at the Printing Technology Institute. She came first in her cohort, earning a Gold Medal, and was given Printing Diploma by Agfa-Gevaert.

Rohini became the first female editor of an evening newspaper in Maharashtra. She is the assistant editor of Navakal and has been editor of Sandhyakal since 16 December 1998.

== Recognition ==
In 1977, Rohini won the Chhatrapati Award for outstanding performance in chess. Subsequently, she has been awarded India's highest honour in sports, the Arjuna award. She has also been declared Maharashtra Kanya for her chess exploits.
