= Abhay Thipsay =

Indian judge

Justice Abhay Mahadeo Thipsay (born 10 March 1955, in Bombay) is a retired judge of the Bombay High Court and the Allahabad High Court. He started his career as an advocate in 1979 and was appointed as Metropolitan Magistrate in the Judicial Service of the State of Maharashtra in 1987. From 2011 to 2016, he was a judge at the High Court of Bombay where he handled civil suits and criminal trials, several of which were complex, lengthy and sensitive.

Justice Thipsay presided over several high-profile cases that garnered significant media attention, including the trial of Tantrik Chandraswami in 1994-95, the conviction of Anna Hazare in 1999, the Best Bakery case and the Sohrabuddin encounter case.

He is an internationally rated chess player. His brother Praveen Thipsay is also a well-known chess player.

== Professional career ==
Thipsay enrolled as an advocate on November 5, 1979, with the Bar Council of Maharashtra and Goa. He practiced in various civil and criminal courts in Mumbai before being appointed as Metropolitan Magistrate in the Judicial Service of Maharashtra on August 26, 1987. He was promoted to Additional Chief Metropolitan Magistrate, Mumbai, and Additional Chief Judge, Small Causes Court, Mumbai on September 1, 1994.

On March 25, 1997, Thipsay became a Judge of the Bombay City Civil and Sessions Court. He oversaw a wide range of civil suits and criminal trials, including serving as a Judge of the Special Court under the Maharashtra Control of Organised Crime Act (MCOCA). Some of his most widely known cases include:

- Tantrik Chandra Swamy trial (1994–95): Thipsay handled the trial of Tantrik Chandra Swamy, involving allegations of fraud and exploitation.
- Anna Hazare conviction (1999): He oversaw the conviction of social activist Anna Hazare for defamation under the Section 500 of the IPC, based on a complaint by a state minister.
- J.W. Singh case (2002): He acquitted dismissed sessions judge J.W. Singh, accused of underworld links, citing improper evidence collections by the police.
- Best Bakery case retrial (2006): Transferred from Gujarat to Maharashtra, Thipsay presided over the retrial of the Best Bakery case, where he convicted nine individuals for their involvement in the 2002 Gujarat riots.

In December 2007, Thipsay was appointed Principal District and Sessions Judge in Jalgaon. He was later elevated to the Bombay High Court as an Additional Judge on March 17, 2011. His tenure at the Bombay High Court included the following notable rulings -

- Salman Khan hit-and-run case (2015): Thipsay granted bail to actor Salman Khan following his conviction in a hit-and-run case, citing the legal principle of bail pending appeal.
- Aurangabad Arms Haul case: Thipsay granted bail to an undertrial in this case, noting the lack of evidence directly linking the accused to the offence.

Justice Thipsay was transferred to the Allahabad High Court on May 2, 2016, where he served until his retirement on March 9, 2017.

== Political career ==
In June 2018, Justice Abhay Thipsay retired from his judicial duties and subsequently joined the Indian National Congress, motivated by his concerns over increasing communalism and aggressive nationalism in India. His induction into the party was formally acknowledged by the then-Congress president Rahul Gandhi at a public event.

After Thipsay joined the Congress, the Supreme Court removed him from a panel aimed at resolving disputes between the Maharashtra government and the State Co-operative Bank. This action was taken because his political affiliation could lead to a conflict of interest.

== Controversies ==
=== Testimony for Nirav Modi ===
In May 2020, during a hearing at Westminster Magistrates' Court in London, Justice Thipsay was consulted via video link from India by the defense team of Nirav Modi, who was challenging his extradition to India. Thipsay testified that the charges brought by the CBI against Nirav Modi, which included criminal conspiracy, cheating and dishonestly inducting delivery of property, would not hold up under Indian law.

The Bharatiya Janata Party accused Thipsay of acting on behalf of the Congress to protect Nirav Modi. However, Thipsay refuted these claims, stating that his participation was purely professional and as a legal expert, not to defend Modi.
