= R. B. Sapre =

Indian chess player (1915–1999)

- Born: 4 March 1915; Bhandup, Mumbai
- Died: May 18, 1999 (aged 84)
- Known for: Chess

Ramchandra Bhargava Sapre (born 4 March 1915 – died 18 May 1999, in Mumbai) was an Indian chess player and first winner of the Indian Chess Championship.
