= Mrunalini Kunte =

Indian chess player

Personal information
- Born: 23 December 1973 (age 52)

Chess career
- Country: India
- Title: Woman International Master (2000)
- Peak rating: 2205 (July 1999)

Mrunalini Kunte (born 1973) is an Indian chess player and a Woman International Master.

She is also a winner of the 1996 Indian Chess Championship.

== Personal life ==
Her brother Abhijit Kunte is also a chess player, and has the grandmaster title.
