= Indian Chess Championship =

Annual national chess championship of India

Indian Chess Championship in Open and Women categories
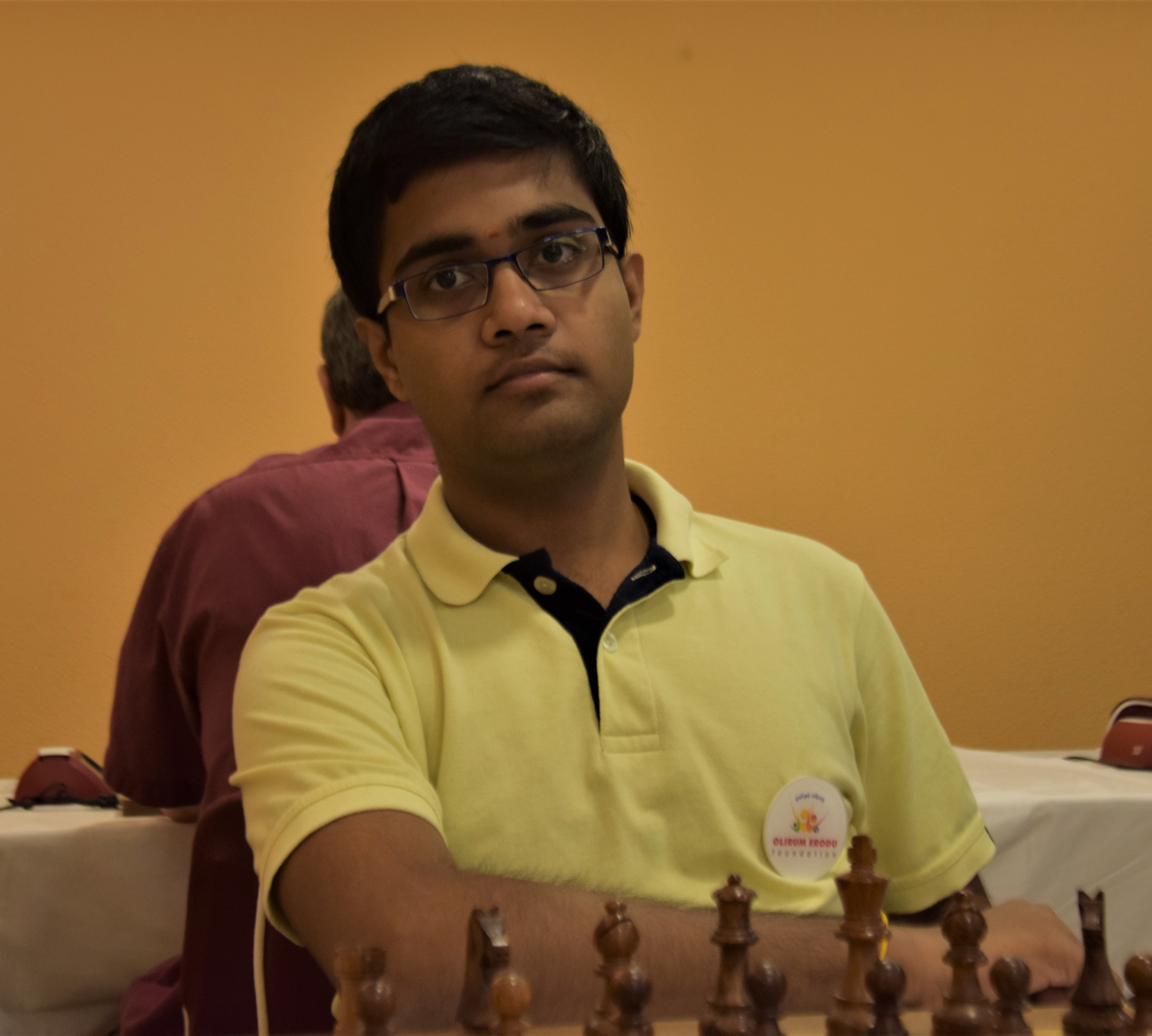
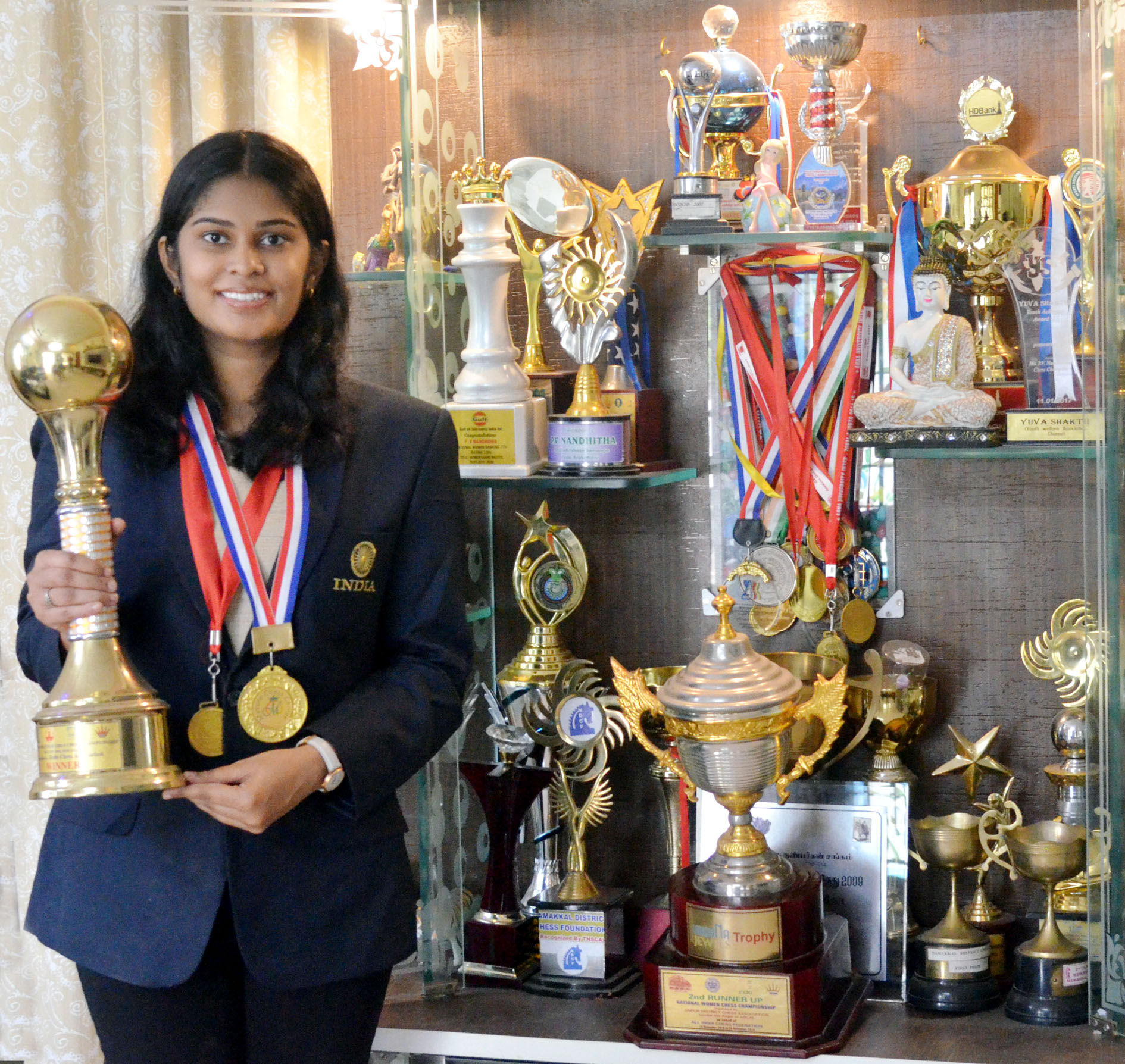
- The 2025 recipients: P. Iniyan and P. V. Nandhidhaa
- Awarded for: Best National Chess player
- Sponsored by: All India Chess Federation
- Rewards: Winner's trophy; ₹7,00,000
- First award: 1955 (Open), 1974 (Women)
- Final award: 2025
- Most recent winner: P. Iniyan in Open; P. V. Nandhidhaa in Women

Highlights
- Most wins: Manuel Aaron (9) in Open, Subbaraman Vijayalakshmi (6) in Women
- First winner: Ramchandra Sapre in Open, Vasanti Khadilkar in Women

The Indian Chess Championship or National Premier Chess Championship is the annual national chess championship of India. It was established in 1955 by the Andhra State Chess Association as a biannual event, but since 1971 it has been played yearly.

The first edition was held in Eluru, Andhra Pradesh from 15 May to 28 May 1955 and was jointly won by Ramchandra Sapre and Dharbha Venkayya with 9/12 points. Earlier, G. S. Dikshit of Pithapuram won the Andhra and Madras State Championships for three consecutive years, 1952–54. Manuel Aaron from the state of Tamilnadu won the Men's National title for a record 9 times, followed by Praveen Thipsay who won the title for 7 times. Surya Shekhar Ganguly had won a record six consecutive National titles from 2003 to 2008. Indian Chess legend Viswanathan Anand won the Nationals title for three consecutive times in 1986, 1987 and 1988. P. Iniyan is the reigning Nationals Men Champion in 2025.

In 1977, Rohini Khadilkar became the first female player to compete in that championship. Some players objected to her being in the tournament because she was female. Her father wrote to the World Chess Federation president, Max Euwe, and Euwe ruled that female players could not be barred from open chess events.

The separate women's championship commenced in 1974. The first ten editions were dominated by the Khadilkar sisters Vasanti, Jayshree and Rohini. Rohini is the youngest and won the championship five times, Jayshree won four titles, and the eldest, Vasanti, won the championship in the inaugural year. Subbaraman Vijayalakshmi won the title for a record 6 times, followed by Rohini Khadilkar and Padmini Rout who have each won the National Women title for a record 5 times. P. V. Nandhidhaa is the reigning Nationals Women Champion in 2025.

As on 2025, the Nationals title winner receives INR 7,00,000 Cash prize followed by INR 5,50,000 and INR 4,50,000 for second and third positions respectively. Championship winners from both men and women events are selected for the Chess World Cup 2027 and Women's Chess World Cup 2027 respectively.

== Winners- Open Champion ==
Edition	Year	City	Men's winner
1	1955	Eluru	Ramchandra Sapre; Dharbha Venkayya
2	1957	Pune	Ramdas Gupta
3	1959	Delhi	Manuel Aaron
4	1961	Hyderabad	Manuel Aaron
5	1963	Mumbai	Farooq Ali
6	1966	Chennai	Rusi Madon
7	1967	Pune	Syed Nasir Ali
8	1969	Bengaluru	Manuel Aaron
9	1971	Bikaner	Manuel Aaron
10	1972	Shimla	Manuel Aaron
11	1973	Ahmedabad	Manuel Aaron
12	1975	Rourkela	Manuel Aaron
13	1976	Patna	Raja Ravi Sekhar
14	1976	Kolkata	Manuel Aaron
15	1978	Kochi	Rafiq Khan
16	1979	Tiruchirappalli	T. N. Parameswaran
17	1979	Vijayawada	Raja Ravi Sekhar
18	1981	New Delhi	Manuel Aaron
19	1982	Kanpur	Praveen Thipsay
20	1983	Agartala	Dibyendu Barua
21	1984	Ahmedabad	Praveen Thipsay
22	1985	Tenali	Praveen Thipsay
23	1986	Mumbai	Viswanathan Anand
24	1987	Tumkur	Viswanathan Anand
25	1988	Neyveli	Viswanathan Anand
26	1989	Bikaner	Praveen Thipsay
27	1990	Kozhikode	D. V. Prasad
28	1991	Pondicherry	D. V. Prasad
29	1992	Patna	Praveen Thipsay
30	1993	Pune	Praveen Thipsay
31	1994	Hyderabad	Praveen Thipsay
32	1995	Chennai	Ponnuswamy Konguvel
33	1996	Kanhangad	T. N. Parameswaran
34	1997	Bhilai	Abhijit Kunte
35	1998	Muzaffarpur	Dibyendu Barua
36	1999	Nagpur	Krishnan Sasikiran
37	2000	Mumbai	Abhijit Kunte
38	2001	Delhi	Dibyendu Barua
39	2002	Nagpur	Krishnan Sasikiran
40	2003	Mumbai	Krishnan Sasikiran
41	2003	Kozhikode	Surya Shekhar Ganguly
42	2004	Visakhapatnam	Surya Shekhar Ganguly
43	2006	Visakhapatnam	Surya Shekhar Ganguly
44	2007	Atul	Surya Shekhar Ganguly
45	2008	Chennai	Surya Shekhar Ganguly
46	2008	Mangaluru	Surya Shekhar Ganguly
47	2009	New Delhi	Baskaran Adhiban
48	2010	New Delhi	Parimarjan Negi
49	2011	Aurangabad	Abhijeet Gupta
50	2012	Kolkata	G. Akash
51	2013	Jalgaon	Krishnan Sasikiran
52	2014	Kottayam	S. P. Sethuraman
53	2015	Thiruvarur	Karthikeyan Murali
54	2016	Lucknow	Karthikeyan Murali
55	2017	Patna	Babu M.R. Lalith
56	2018	Jammu	Aravindh Chithambaram
57	2019	Majitar	Aravindh Chithambaram
58	2022	Kanpur	Arjun Erigaisi
59	2022-23	New Delhi	Karthik Venkataraman
60	2023	Pune	S. P. Sethuraman
61	2024	Gurgaon	Karthik Venkataraman
62	2025	Guntur	P. Iniyan

== Winners- Women Champions ==
Edition	Year	City	Women's winner
1	1974	Bangalore	Vasanti Khadilkar
2	1975	Calcutta	Jayshree Khadilkar
3	1976	Kottayam	Rohini Khadilkar
4	1977	Hyderabad	Rohini Khadilkar
5	1979	Chennai	Rohini Khadilkar
6	1979	Sangli	Jayshree Khadilkar
7	1981	New Delhi	Rohini Khadilkar
8	1982	Rajnandgaon	Jayshree Khadilkar
9	1983	Bikaner	Jayshree Khadilkar
10	1983	Kottayam	Rohini Khadilkar
11	1985	Nagpur	Bhagyashree Sathe
12	1986	Jalandhar	Bhagyashree Sathe
13	1987	Calcutta	Saritha Reddy
14	1988	Kurukshetra	Bhagyashree Sathe
15	1989	Durg	Anupama Abhyankar
16	1990	Vijaywada	Anupama Abhyankar
17	1991	Kozhikode	Bhagyashree Thipsay
18	1991	Mumbai	Anupama Gokhale
19	1993	Kozhikode	Anupama Gokhale
20	1994	Bangalore	Bhagyashree Thipsay
21	1995	Chennai	Subbaraman Vijayalakshmi
22	1996	Salem	Mrunalini Kunte
23	1997	Calcutta	Anupama Gokhale
24	1998	Mumbai	Subbaraman Vijayalakshmi
25	1999	Kozhikode	Subbaraman Vijayalakshmi
26	2000	Mumbai	Subbaraman Vijayalakshmi
27	2001	New Delhi	Subbaraman Vijayalakshmi
28	2002	Lucknow	Subbaraman Vijayalakshmi
29	2003	Mumbai	Aarthie Ramaswamy
30	2003	Kozhikode	Humpy Koneru
31	2005	Bangalore	Nisha Mohota
32	2006	Vizag	Swati Ghate
33	2006	Chennai	Tania Sachdev
34	2007	Pune	Tania Sachdev
35	2008	New Delhi	Kruttika Nadig
36	2009	Chennai	Harika Dronavalli
37	2010	Bhubaneswar	Soumya Swaminathan
38	2011	Chennai	Mary Ann Gomes
39	2012	Jalgaon	Mary Ann Gomes
40	2013	Kolkata	Mary Ann Gomes
41	2014	Sangli	Padmini Rout
42	2015	Kolkata	Padmini Rout
43	2016	New Delhi	Padmini Rout
44	2017	Surat	Padmini Rout
45	2018	Jaipur	Bhakti Kulkarni
46	2019	Karaikudi	Bhakti Kulkarni
47	2022	Bhubaneswar	Divya Deshmukh
48	2022-23	Kolhapur	Divya Deshmukh
49	2023	New Delhi	Padmini Rout
50	2024	Karaikudi	P. V. Nandhidhaa
51	2025	Durgapur	P. V. Nandhidhaa

== Gallery ==
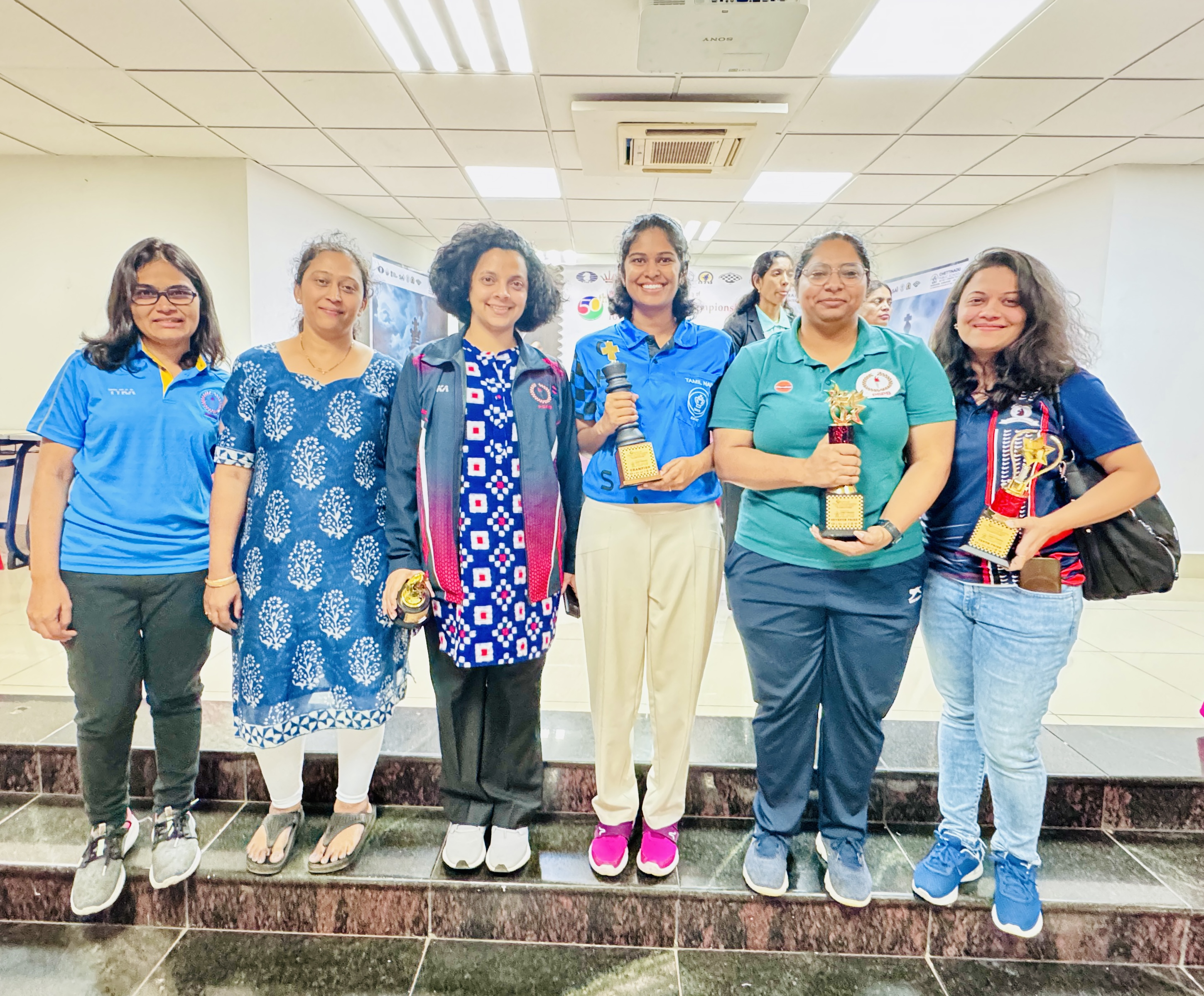
Multiple National Women Chess Championship winners over the years, clicked during the closing ceremony of the 50th National Women Chess Championship- 2024. Left to Right- Nisha Mohota, Swati Ghate, Padmini Rout, P. V. Nandhidhaa, Mary Ann Gomes and Bhakti Kulkarni.
