= Anupama Gokhale =

Indian chess player

Personal information
- Born: 17 May 1969 (age 57) Mumbai, India

Chess career
- Country: India
- Title: Woman International Master (1986)
- Peak rating: 2222 (April 2002)

Anupama Gokhale (born Anupama Abhyankar; 17 May 1969) is an Indian chess player. She won the Indian Women's Championship five times (1989, 1990, 1991, 1993, and 1997) and the Asian Women's Championship twice (1985 and 1987). In 1985 she was also joint winner, with Malaysian player Audrey Wong, of the Asian Junior Girls' Championship in Adelaide. This achievement automatically earned both players the title of Woman International Master (WIM).

She played for the Indian national team in three Women's Chess Olympiads (1988, 1990 and 1992) and two Women's Asian Team Chess Championships (2003 and 2005), winning the team silver medal in the latter event in 2005.

Gokhale was the recipient of the Padma Shri Award in 1986 and the Arjuna Award in 1990. She is the youngest Padma Shri awardee, being only 16 years old when she received it.

She is married to Dronacharya Award winner Raghunandan Gokhale, a chess player himself. She works for Bharat Petroleum Corporation Limited.
