= Jayshree Khadilkar =

Indian chess player (born 1962)

Jayshree Khadilkar Pande
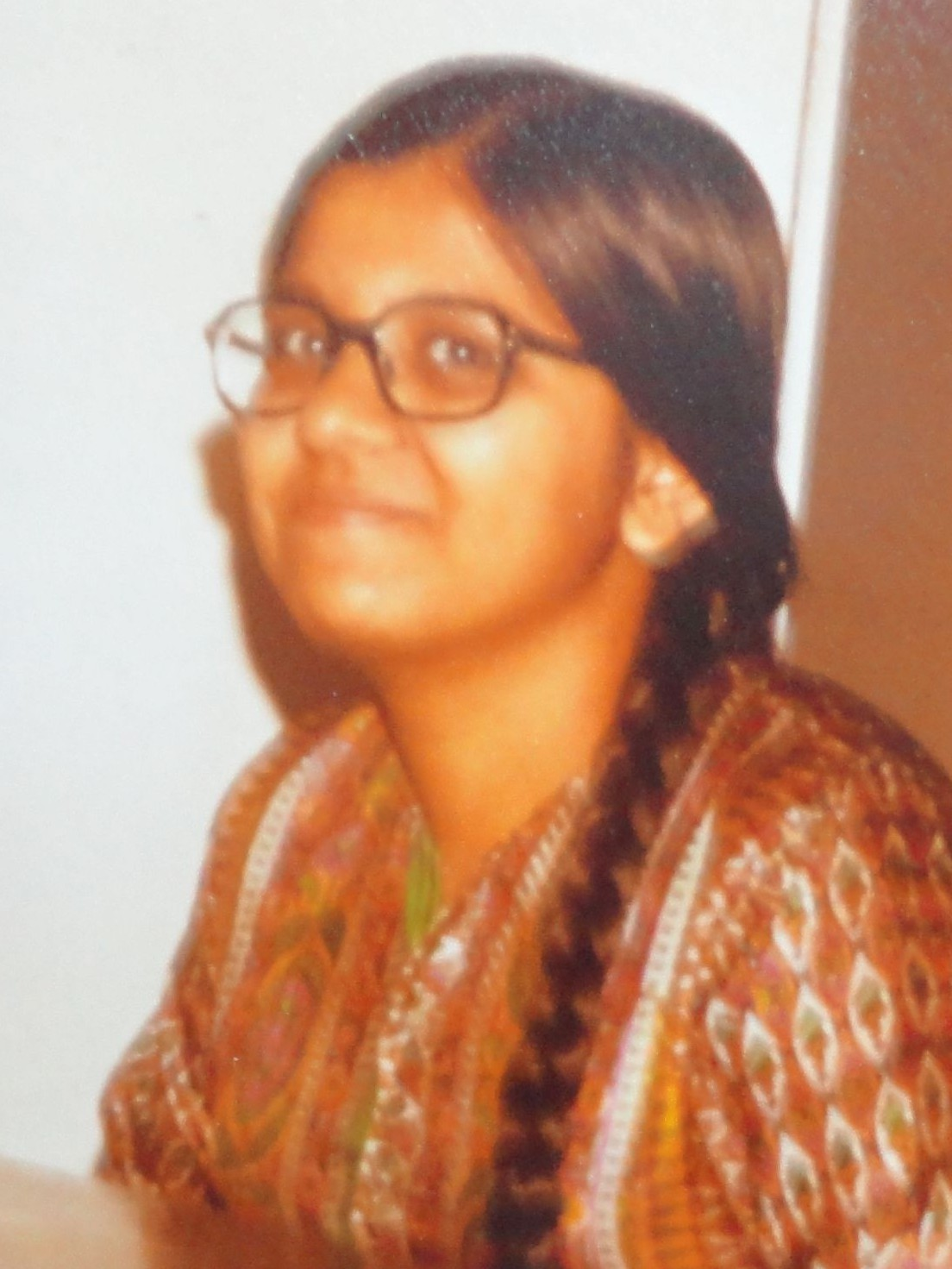
- Rio de Janeiro, 1979

Personal information
- Born: 25 April 1962 (age 64)

Chess career
- Country: India
- Title: Woman International Master (1979)
- FIDE rating: 2120 [inactive]
- Peak rating: 2120 (January 1987)

Jayshree Khadilkar Pande (born 25 April 1962) is an Indian chess player who was awarded the FIDE title of Woman International Master (WIM) in 1979. She was the first Indian woman to achieve this title. She is the first player from India to achieve this title and won the Indian women's championship four times.

== Career ==
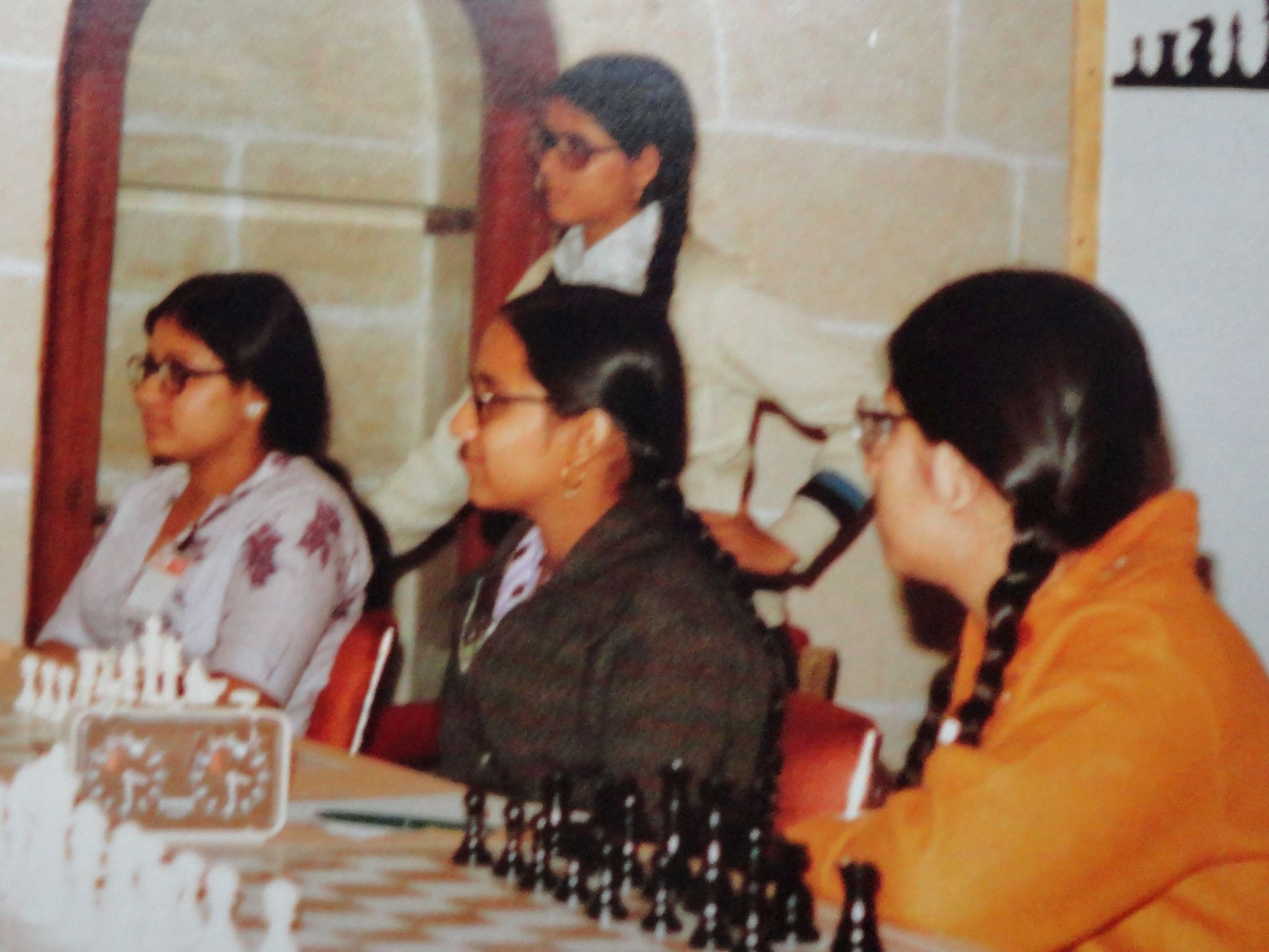
The Khaldikar sisters at Valletta, Chess Olympiad 1980

Jayshree Khadilkar was instrumental in changing the world of competitive chess for female players when she secured a mandate from the FIDE president, that prevented them from disqualifying female chess players from national and international tournaments due to their gender.

The three Khadilkar sisters, Vasanti, Jayshree, and Rohini dominated the women's chess championships of India, winning all the titles in its first decade. Jayshree's peak FIDE strength rating was 2120, which she earned in January 1987. Of the three sisters, she has won the most titles and tournaments.

She is also the editor, printer, and publisher of Nava Kaal newspaper.
