= Asian Individual Chess Championship =

Chess tournament in Asia

The Asian Individual Chess Championship is a chess tournament open to all players from Asian chess federations (FIDE zones from 3.1 to 3.8). It is held with the Swiss system and consists of two divisions, Open and Women's, the latter of which is reserved to female players. Both sections determine the Asian champions and qualify a certain number of players for the FIDE World Cup and Women's World Cup. The Championship is regulated by the Asian Chess Federation.

== Winners ==
=== Open ===
Nr	Year	City	Winner
1	1998	Tehran	Rustam Kasimdzhanov (Uzbekistan)
2	2000	Udaipur	Xu Jun (China)
3	2001	Kolkata	Xu Jun (China)
4	2003	Doha	Krishnan Sasikiran (India)
5	2005	Hyderabad	Zhang Zhong (China)
6	2007	Cebu City	Zhang Pengxiang (China)
7	2009	Subic Bay Freeport Zone	Surya Shekhar Ganguly (India)
8	2010	Subic Bay Freeport Zone	Ni Hua (China)
9	2011	Mashhad	Pentala Harikrishna (India)
10	2012	Ho Chi Minh City	Parimarjan Negi (India)
11	2013	Manila	Li Chao (China)
12	2014	Sharjah	Yu Yangyi (China)
13	2015	Al Ain	Salem A. R. Saleh (UAE)
14	2016	Tashkent	S. P. Sethuraman (India)
15	2017	Chengdu	Wang Hao (China)
16	2018	Makati	Wei Yi (China)
17	2019	Xingtai	Lê Quang Liêm (Vietnam)
18	2022	New Delhi	R Praggnanandhaa (India)
19	2023	Almaty	Shamsiddin Vokhidov (Uzbekistan)
20	2025	Al Ain	Bardiya Daneshvar (Iran)
21	2026	Ulaanbaatar	Kong Xiangrui (China)

=== Women ===
Nr	Year	City	Winner
1	1981	Hyderabad	Rohini Khadilkar (India)
2	1983	Kuala Lumpur	Rohini Khadilkar (India)
3	1985	Dhaka	Anupama Gokhale (India)
4	1987	Hyderabad	Anupama Gokhale (India)
5	1991	Bhopal	Bhagyashree Thipsay (India)
6	1996	Salem	Upi Darmayana Tamin (Indonesia)
7	1998	Kuala Lumpur	Xu Yuhua (China)
8	2000	Udaipur	Hoang Thanh Trang (Vietnam)
9	2001	Chennai	Li Ruofan (China)
10	2003	Kozhikode	Humpy Koneru (India)
11	2004	Beirut	Wang Yu (China)
12	2007	Tehran	Tania Sachdev (India)
13	2009	Subic Bay Freeport Zone	Zhang Xiaowen (China)
14	2010	Subic Bay Freeport Zone	Atousa Pourkashiyan (Iran)
15	2011	Mashhad	Harika Dronavalli (India)
16	2012	Ho Chi Minh City	Irene Kharisma Sukandar (Indonesia)
17	2013	Manila	Huang Qian (China)
18	2014	Sharjah	Irene Kharisma Sukandar (Indonesia)
19	2015	Al Ain	Mitra Hejazipour (Iran)
20	2016	Tashkent	Bhakti Kulkarni (India)
21	2017	Chengdu	Vo Thi Kim Phung (Vietnam)
22	2018	Makati	Padmini Rout (India)
23	2019	Xingtai	Dinara Saduakassova (Kazakhstan)
24	2022	New Delhi	P. V. Nandhidhaa (India)
25	2023	Almaty	Divya Deshmukh (India)
26	2025	Al Ain	Song Yuxin (China)
27	2026	Ulaanbaatar	Savitha Shri Baskar (India)

== Gallery ==
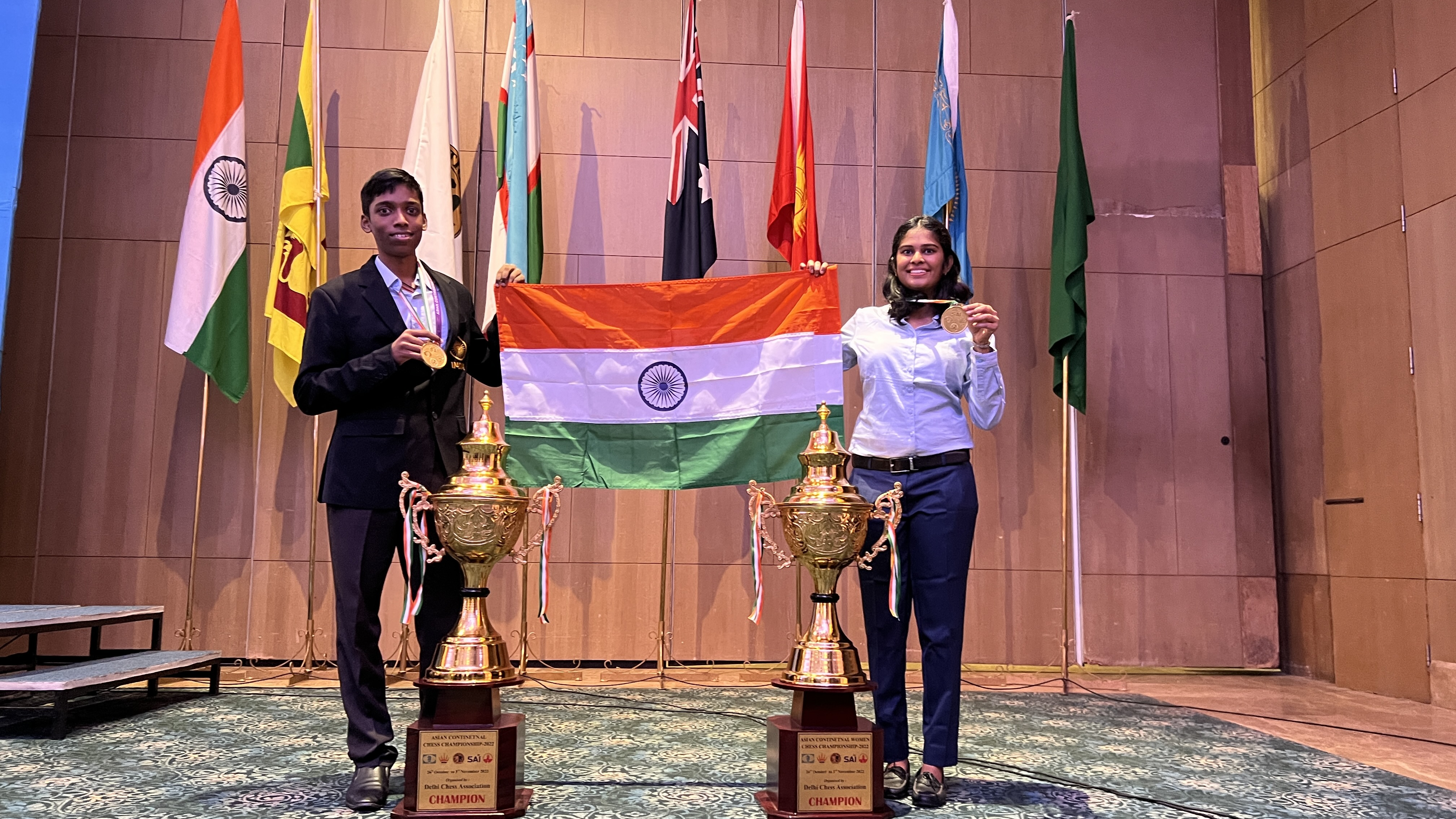
R Praggnanandhaa and P. V. Nandhidhaa- Champions in 2022

== See also ==
- World Chess Championship
- Asian Senior Chess Championship
