= Mahel Boyer =

French chess grandmaster (born 2004)

Personal information
- Born: December 27, 2004 (age 21)

Chess career
- Country: France
- Title: Grandmaster (2025)
- FIDE rating: 2492 (July 2026)
- Peak rating: 2542 (July 2025)

Mahel Boyer is a French chess grandmaster.

== Career ==
In December 2024, he played in the European Rapid Chess Championship, where he was the highest-finishing IM and tying for 4th place with 7 grandmasters.

In February 2025, he won the Cappelle-la-Grande Open tournament, tying and beating grandmaster P. Iniyan on tiebreak scores.

He was awarded the Grandmaster title in August 2025, after achieving his norms at the:

- Festival des Jeux in February 2022
- Southend Masters in April 2023
- 22e rencontres du Cap d'Agde Grand Prix in November 2024
