= Sanjoy Majumder =

- Born: London
- Education: St. Stephan's College, Delhi; Northwestern University
- Occupation: Journalist

Sanjoy Majumder is a journalist associated with British Broadcasting Corporation (BBC). He was appointed as the India Correspondent of BBC in August 2006.

Sanjoy Majumder was born in London and grew up in Africa, the Middle East and India. Prior to joining the BBC, he worked for the American television networks National Broadcasting Company (NBC) and Public Broadcasting Service (PBS). He started his career at BBC in 1999, was posted to the BBC South Asia bureau in Delhi in 2001 as the India Online Editor (October 2001 – July 2006).
