= Shrivastav Madhubhai Babubhai =

Indian politician

Shrivastav Madhubhai Babubhai, also known as Madhu Shrivastav. He was a RSS-aligned BJP MLA from Waghodia (Vadodara), a city in Gujarat, India. A land developer by profession, he is also an accused in the Best Bakery case of 2002 Gujarat riots

Subsequently, he was also accused of conspiring with Amit Shah to work out a compromise with Zahira Shaikh, one of the prime witnesses in the Best bakery case. In 2008, he was arrested by the Vadodara police for creating nuisance in public spaces. In 2014, he made a C grade Gujarati movie called "Lion of Gujarat" in which he starred as the hero. Earlier it was the then chief minister Narendra Modi who was called the "Lion of Gujarat" (Gujarat nu sher) during his Gaurav yatras in 2002. As per the Gujarat government, he has nine cases pending against him.

In November 2022 he announced to contest the upcoming assembly election independently when his party BJP denied a ticket. He also made a controversial remark at a rally, saying, If anyone misbehaves with any of my people, I will shoot them.
