= Brazilian Chess Championship =

Annual national chess championship in Brazil

The Brazilian Chess Championship (Portuguese: Campeonato Brasileiro de Xadrez) is the annual national chess championship of Brazil, organized by the Brazilian Chess Confederation (CBX). The inaugural open championship was held in 1927 and won by João de Souza Mendes, while the first women's championship took place in 1957 and was won by Dora Rúbio.

Four players share the record of seven open titles: João de Souza Mendes, Jaime Sunye Neto, Rafael Leitão, and Giovanni Vescovi. In the women's championship, Juliana Sayumi Terao holds the record with nine titles.

== History ==
=== Match era (1927–1943) ===
From 1927 to 1940, the championship was held exclusively in Rio de Janeiro (then the national capital) and decided through head-to-head challenge matches. In the inaugural 1927 match, João de Souza Mendes defeated Romano 3½–1½, subsequently defending the title against Walter Oswaldo Cruz in 1928 and 1929 and against José Lacerda Guimarães in 1930.

When Souza Mendes did not defend the title in 1933, Orlando Roças Jr. defeated Alberto Gama 3–1 to win the championship, retaining it in 1934 after drawing a challenge match against Souza Mendes. Thomas Borges claimed the title in 1935, and between 1938 and 1940 Walter Cruz and Octavio Trompowsky contested three consecutive championship matches, with Cruz winning in 1938 (4–3) and 1940 (5½–1½) and Trompowsky winning in 1939 (5½–2½).

No event was held in 1941; however, in August 1949, the CBX board retroactively awarded the 1941 title to Adhemar da Silva Rocha despite the absence of recorded games. In 1942, the championship left Rio de Janeiro for the first time, with Cruz defeating Paulo Duarte Filho in São Paulo for his third title. The final edition decided by knockout matches took place in 1943, with semifinals in Teresópolis and São Paulo before Souza Mendes defeated Raul Charlier in the final to win his fifth championship.

=== Tournament and modern eras (1945–present) ===
Beginning in 1945 in Nova Friburgo, the championship transitioned from challenge matches to round-robin tournaments, broadening participation beyond Rio de Janeiro and São Paulo. Orlando Roças Jr. won the 1945 event undefeated, followed by Márcio Elísio de Freitas in 1947. Walter Cruz won back-to-back titles in 1948 and 1949 and added a sixth in 1953, before Souza Mendes equaled him in 1954 and became the first seven-time champion with an undefeated victory in a 20-player field in 1958.

The 1960s featured titles by brothers Ronald Câmara (1960, 1961) and Hélder Câmara (1963, 1968), alongside future World Championship candidate Henrique Mecking (1965, 1967). Jaime Sunye Neto matched Souza Mendes's record of seven titles between 1976 and 1983, followed by dominant eras from Gilberto Milos (six titles between 1984 and 1995), Rafael Leitão (seven titles between 1996 and 2014), and Giovanni Vescovi (seven titles between 1999 and 2010).

In the modern era, the competition format has alternated between knockout matches, round-robins, and the Swiss system. Knockout formats were used in 1991, 1998, 2017, and 2019; in the 1998 edition, held 9–19 December in Itabirito, Minas Gerais, a 16-player field played two-game single-elimination matches before Rafael Leitão defeated Giovanni Vescovi 2½–1½ in the four-game final. A 12-player round-robin was used from 2005 to 2016, while the Swiss system was adopted from 1999 to 2004 and again from 2021 onward. The 86th edition (corresponding to the 2019 cycle) was played in January 2020 in Natal, and no separate championship was held later in 2020 due to the COVID-19 pandemic.

== Winners ==
Men's Winners
#	Year	City	Champion
1	1927	Rio de Janeiro	João de Souza Mendes
2	1928	Rio de Janeiro	João de Souza Mendes
3	1929	Rio de Janeiro	João de Souza Mendes
4	1930	Rio de Janeiro	João de Souza Mendes
5	1933	Rio de Janeiro	Orlando Rocas
6	1934	Rio de Janeiro	Orlando Rocas
7	1935	Rio de Janeiro	Thomaz Pompeu Accioly Borges
8	1938	Rio de Janeiro	Walter Cruz
9	1939	Rio de Janeiro	Octavio Trompowsky
10	1940	Rio de Janeiro	Walter Cruz
11	1941	awarded the title in 1949	Adhemar da Silva Rocha
12	1942	São Paulo	Walter Cruz
13	1943	São Paulo	João de Souza Mendes
14	1945	Nova Friburgo	Orlando Rocas
15	1947	Porto Alegre	Marcio Elisio Freitas
16	1948	Rio de Janeiro	Walter Cruz
17	1949	Rio de Janeiro	Walter Cruz
18	1950	Rio de Janeiro	Jose Thiago Mangini
19	1951	Fortaleza	Eugênio German
20	1952	São Paulo	Flavio Carvalho Jr.
21	1953	Rio de Janeiro	Walter Cruz
22	1954	São Paulo	João de Souza Mendes
23	1956	Rio de Janeiro	Jose Thiago Mangini
24	1957	Rio de Janeiro	Luis Tavares
25	1958	Rio de Janeiro	João de Souza Mendes
26	1959	São Paulo	Olicio Gadia
27	1960	Fortaleza	Ronald Câmara
28	1961	Vitoria	Ronald Câmara
29	1962	Campinas	Olicio Gadia
30	1963	Recife	Hélder Câmara
31	1964	Brasília	Antonio Rocha
32	1965	Rio de Janeiro	Henrique Mecking
33	1966	Belo Horizonte	José Pinto Paiva
34	1967	São Paulo	Henrique Mecking
35	1968	São Bernardo do Campo	Hélder Câmara
36	1969	São Paulo	Antonio Rocha
37	1970	Recife	Herman Claudius van Riemsdijk
38	1971	Fortaleza	José Pinto Paiva
39	1972	Blumenau	Eugênio German
40	1973	Salvador	Herman Claudius van Riemsdijk
41	1974	Rio de Janeiro	Márcio Miranda, Alexandru Segal
42	1975	Caxias do Sul	Carlos Gouveia
43	1976	João Pessoa	Jaime Sunye Neto
44	1977	Curitiba	Jaime Sunye Neto
45	1978	Natal	Alexandru Segal
46	1979	Fortaleza	Jaime Sunye Neto
47	1980	Nova Friburgo	Jaime Sunye Neto
48	1981	São Luís	Jaime Sunye Neto
49	1982	Brasília	Jaime Sunye Neto
50	1983	São Paulo	Jaime Sunye Neto, Marcos Paolozzi
51	1984	Cabo Frio	Gilberto Milos
52	1985	Brasília	Gilberto Milos
53	1986	Cabo Frio	Gilberto Milos
54	1987	Canela	Carlos Gouveia
55	1988	São Paulo	Herman Claudius van Riemsdijk
56	1989	Fortaleza	Gilberto Milos
57	1990	Porto Alegre	Roberto Watanabe
58	1991	Bebedouro	Everaldo Matsuura
59	1992	Curitiba	Darcy Lima
60	1993	Brasília	Aron Correa
61	1994	Americana, São Paulo	Gilberto Milos
62	1995	Brasília	Gilberto Milos
63	1996	Americana, São Paulo	Rafael Leitão
64	1997	Rio de Janeiro	Rafael Leitão
65	1998	Itabirito	Rafael Leitão
66	1999	Brasília	Giovanni Vescovi
67	2000	Teresina	Giovanni Vescovi
68	2001	São Paulo	Giovanni Vescovi
69	2002	Brasília	Darcy Lima
70	2003	Miguel Pereira	Darcy Lima
71	2004	São José do Rio Preto	Rafael Leitão
72	2005	Guarulhos	Alexandr Fier
73	2006	Guarulhos	Giovanni Vescovi
74	2007	Rio de Janeiro	Giovanni Vescovi
75	2008	Porto Alegre	André Diamant
76	2009	Americana, São Paulo	Giovanni Vescovi
77	2010	Americana, São Paulo	Giovanni Vescovi
78	2011	Americana, São Paulo	Rafael Leitão
79	2012	Montenegro	Krikor Mekhitarian
80	2013	João Pessoa	Rafael Leitão
81	2014	João Pessoa	Rafael Leitão
82	2015	Rio de Janeiro	Krikor Mekhitarian
83	2016	Rio de Janeiro	Everaldo Matsuura
84	2017	Rio de Janeiro	Alexandr Fier
85	2018	Natal	Roberto Junio Brito Molina
86	2020	Natal	Alexandr Fier
87	2021	Cuiabá	Luis Paulo Supi
88	2022	Recife	Alexandr Fier
89	2023	Recife	Luis Paulo Supi
90	2024	Natal	Alexandr Fier
91	2025	Timbó	Luis Paulo Supi

Women's Winners
#	Year	City	Champion
1	1957	São Paulo	Dora de Castro Rúbio
2	1958	São Paulo	Taya Efremoff
3	1959	Rio de Janeiro	Taya Efremoff
4	1960	Brusque	Dora de Castro Rúbio
5	1961	Rio de Janeiro	Dora de Castro Rúbio
6	1962	Araraquara	Dora de Castro Rúbio
7	1963	Rio de Janeiro	Ruth Volgl Cardoso
8	1965	Rio de Janeiro	Ruth Volgl Cardoso
9	1966	Belo Horizonte	Ruth Volgl Cardoso
10	1967	São Paulo	Ruth Volgl Cardoso
11	1968	São Bernardo do Campo	Ruth Volgl Cardoso
12	1969	Rio de Janeiro	Ivone Moysés
13	1971	São Paulo	Ligia Imam Alvim
14	1972	Blumenau	Ruth Volgl Cardoso
15	1973	Guarapari	Ivone Moysés
16	1975	Rio de Janeiro	Maria Cristina de Oliveira
17	1976	São Paulo	Jussara Chaves
18	1977	Brasília	Ruth Volgl Cardoso
19	1978	Brasília	Ligia de Abreu Carvalho
20	1979	Mogi Guaçu	Ligia de Abreu Carvalho
21	1980	Laguna	Ligia de Abreu Carvalho
22	1981	Laguna	Jussara Chaves
23	1982	Mogi Guaçu	Jussara Chaves; Regina Lúcia Ribeiro
24	1984	Peabiru	Regina Lúcia Ribeiro
25	1985	Guarapari	Regina Lúcia Ribeiro
26	1986	Garanhuns	Maria Cristina de Oliveira
27	1987	Canela	Regina Lúcia Ribeiro
28	1988	Caiobá	Palas Atena Veloso
29	1989	Maringá	Jussara Chaves
30	1990	Rio de Janeiro	Regina Lúcia Ribeiro
31	1991	Blumenau	Joara Chaves
32	1992	São Sebastião	Regina Lúcia Ribeiro
33	1993	Brasília	Palas Athena Veloso
34	1994	Brasília	Tatiana Ratcu
35	1995	Brasília	Tatiana Ratcu
36	1996	Florianópolis	Tatiana Ratcu
37	1997	Itapirubá	Tatiana Ratcu
38	1998	São Paulo	Joara Chaves
39	1999	Altinópolis	Paula Fernanda Delai
40	2000	Batatais	Tatiana Ratcu
41	2001	Bariri	Tatiana Peres Duarte
42	2002	Batatais	Joara Chaves
43	2003	Miguel Pereira	Regina Lúcia Ribeiro
44	2004	Curitiba	Suzana Chang
45	2005	Jundiaí	Tatiana Peres Duarte
46	2006	São Paulo	Regina Lúcia Ribeiro
47	2007	Americana, São Paulo	Suzana Chang
48	2008	Novo Hamburgo	Joara Chaves
49	2009	Capão da Canoa	Vanessa Feliciano
50	2010	Catanduva	Vanessa Feliciano
51	2011	Balneário Camboriú	Artemis Pamela Cruz
52	2012	São José do Rio Preto	Juliana Sayumi Terao
53	2013	São José do Rio Preto	Vanessa Feliciano
54	2014	Blumenau	Vanessa Feliciano
55	2015	São Paulo	Juliana Sayumi Terao
56	2016	Rio de Janeiro	Juliana Sayumi Terao
57	2017	Rio de Janeiro	Juliana Sayumi Terao
58	2018	Rio de Janeiro	Juliana Sayumi Terao
59	2019	Rio de Janeiro	Juliana Sayumi Terao
60	2021	Cuiabá	Julia Alboredo
61	2022	Recife	Juliana Sayumi Terao
62	2023	Timbó	Juliana Sayumi Terao
63	2024	Timbó	Juliana Sayumi Terao
64	2025	Recife	Kathiê Librelato
65	2026	Florianópolis	Julia Alboredo

== Multiple champions ==
=== Open ===
Titles	Player	Years
7	João de Souza Mendes	1927, 1928, 1929, 1930, 1943, 1954, 1958
7	Jaime Sunye Neto	1976, 1977, 1979, 1980, 1981, 1982, 1983
7	Rafael Leitão	1996, 1997, 1998, 2004, 2011, 2013, 2014
7	Giovanni Vescovi	1999, 2000, 2001, 2006, 2007, 2009, 2010
6	Walter Cruz	1938, 1940, 1942, 1948, 1949, 1953
6	Gilberto Milos	1984, 1985, 1986, 1989, 1994, 1995
5	Alexandr Fier	2005, 2017, 2020, 2022, 2024
3	Orlando Roças Jr.	1933, 1934, 1945
3	Herman Claudius van Riemsdijk	1970, 1973, 1988
3	Darcy Lima	1992, 2002, 2003
3	Luis Paulo Supi	2021, 2023, 2025
2	José Thiago Mangini	1950, 1956
2	Eugênio German	1951, 1972
2	Olício Gadia	1959, 1962
2	Ronald Câmara	1960, 1961
2	Hélder Câmara	1963, 1968
2	Antônio Rocha	1964, 1969
2	Henrique Mecking	1965, 1967
2	José Pinto Paiva	1966, 1971
2	Alexandru Segal	1974, 1978
2	Carlos Gouveia	1975, 1987
2	Everaldo Matsuura	1991, 2016
2	Krikor Mekhitarian	2012, 2015

=== Women ===
Titles	Player	Years
9	Juliana Sayumi Terao	2012, 2015, 2016, 2017, 2018, 2019, 2022, 2023, 2024
8	Regina Lúcia Ribeiro	1982, 1984, 1985, 1987, 1990, 1992, 2003, 2006
7	Ruth Volkl Cardoso	1963, 1965, 1966, 1967, 1968, 1972, 1977
5	Tatiana Ratcu	1994, 1995, 1996, 1997, 2000
4	Dora de Castro Rúbio	1957, 1960, 1961, 1962
4	Jussara Chaves	1976, 1981, 1982, 1989
4	Joara Chaves	1991, 1998, 2002, 2008
4	Vanessa Feliciano	2009, 2010, 2013, 2014
3	Lígia de Abreu Carvalho	1978, 1979, 1980
2	Taya Efremoff	1958, 1959
2	Ivone Moysés	1969, 1973
2	Maria Cristina de Oliveira	1975, 1986
2	Palas Atena Veloso	1988, 1993
2	Tatiana Peres Duarte	2001, 2005
2	Suzana Chang	2004, 2007
2	Julia Alboredo	2021, 2026
