= Alexandru Segal =

Personal information
- Full name: Alexandru Sorin Segal
- Born: October 4, 1947 Bucharest, Romania
- Died: January 6, 2015 (aged 67)

Chess career
- Country: Romania; Brazil (from 1971)
- Title: International Master (1977)
- Peak rating: 2415 (January 1980)

Alexandru Sorin Segal was a Jewish Romanian Brazilian economist and chess player. He was the Brazilian chess champion in 1974 and 1978. He became internationally known for his participation in five Chess Olympiads.

== Biography ==
When he was only twelve years old, Segal was already ranked among the world-class chess players in Romania, becoming later European youth champion Sub-26. In 1968, he won the university championship. Segal participated in national finals and represented Brazil in several international events. He defeated the German grandmaster Robert Hübner and drew with Hungarian grandmaster Zoltán Ribli.

In 1970, he completed his BA in Economics and came to live in Brazil in 1971, where he actively attended the São Paulo Chess Club.

In 1972, he became champion of São Paulo. The following year, he became Brazil's runner-up, qualifying for the 21st Chess Olympiad. In 1978, he again represented Brazil in the 23rd Chess Olympiad. He also participated in three other Chess Olympiads (1982, 1984, and 1986), referring to himself as an "Olympic" chess player.

As the Brazilian champion in 1974, he participated in the Pan American Chess Championship in Winnipeg, where he ranked 39th, thus achieving the first International Master norm. Segal scored his second norm in the Tournament of the City of São Paulo in 1977, and the title of International Master was granted in the same year by the International Chess Federation (FIDE). He participated in the final of the championship several times and qualified as holder of the team that represented Brazil in 1982 in Switzerland.

In his career successes, he was champion of Santa Catarina in 1980 and 1981. He was São Paulo champion four times (1972, 1976, 1991 and 1993) and Brazilian champion twice (1974 and 1978). He was also Brazilian record holder with 155 simultaneous matches. He participated in over 900 national and international tournaments.

He published his first book 1972, on the match between Bobby Fischer and Boris Spassky. In 1982, he published his second book, Fundamentos da Tática ("Fundamentals of Tactics").

Segal was a chess instructor at various clubs. He also lectured throughout Brazil. He worked as a journalist for eight years for the newspaper Folha de S.Paulo and also wrote for the Jornal da Tarde. He was a commentator in the Jornal da Globo, TV Globo's nightly news during the Rio Interzonal in 1979. He was also International Referee since 1984. He was one of the first chess professionals in Brazil, alongside the chessmasters Hélder Câmara, Antônio Rocha and Herman Claudius van Riemsdijk. In the 1970s, they were known as the "Big Four" of Brazilian chess. Segal came to reach a peak FIDE rating of 2415 in January 1980. He was a charismatic chess player and had a prodigious memory. Segal always repeated that the grandmaster Gilberto Milos was the strongest Brazilian chess player he faced.

Segal created many chess expressions in the portuguese language, among them passadinha segalesca, a kind of tactical blow at the end, where pawns are sacrificed to promote one to a queen.

In his repertoire of openings, Segal included the Alekhine Defense, Larsen Opening and the closed Benoni, among others. He had a solid positional style, very steady game and was an excellent tactician.

Segal died on January 6, 2015, at age 67.

== Published works ==
- Campeonato Mundial - Fischer x Spassky. Editora Brasiliense, 1972.
- Fundamentos da Tática. Gráfica Editora Colúmbia, 1982.
