= Águas de São Pedro–São Paulo 1941 chess tournament =

First Brazilian international chess event

The Águas de São Pedro International Tournament (Portuguese: Torneio Internacional de Águas de São Pedro) was a chess tournament held from 2 to 26 July 1941 in Águas de São Pedro and São Paulo. The event, the first international chess tournament of Brazil, was organized by the São Paulo Chess Club and sponsored by Antonio and Octavio Moura Andrade, being the latter founder of Águas de São Pedro and owner of the Grande Hotel.

European masters were invited, as well as South American masters. The representatives of Brazil were selected by the Brazilian Confederation of Chess and the São Paulo Chess Club.

The tournament would begin on June 30, but it was preferred to start the competition on July 2. Most of the matches took place at the Grande Hotel in Águas de São Pedro, but the last four have occurred in São Paulo. Of these four, two occurred in the foyer of the Municipal Theatre, and two occurred at the headquarters of São Paulo Chess Club, on the second floor of the Martinelli Building.

The rules of the tournament were:

1. The regulation time for the duration of matches will be of five hours, with each player executing 40 moves in two hours and a half and 16 more moves in the subsequent hours, with cumulative time. The interrupted matches will be continued on the same day from 9:30 p.m. to 11:30 p.m.. If there is a new interruption, its continuation will be fixed by the technical committee.
2. Competitors should note their matches and deliver a clearly legible and correct copy of them to the technical committee.
3. The last session can not be played while all suspended matches are not completed, and the latter session will not be interrupted, unless the ones strictly necessary for meals.
4. There will be five sessions per week, and the Mondays and Thursdays are reserved to rest. The matches will be played from 2:30 p.m. to 7:30 p.m..

== Results ==
The tournament was won by Erich Eliskases and Carlos Guimard, that tied in the first position with 14 points each. In the second place, Paulino Frydman and Ludwig Engels tied, both with 12½ points. In the third place, Markas Luckis with 11½ points; the fourth was Mariano Castillo, with 10 points; the fifth was Aristide Gromer, with 9½ points; the sixth was Julio Bolbochán, with 8½ points; the seventh was Boris Schnaiderman, with 8 points; the eighth was Julio Balparda, with 7 points; the ninth was Julio Salas Romo, with 5½ points; tied in the tenth position, Joaquim Gentil Caetano Netto e José Thiago Mangini, both with 5 points; tied in the eleventh position, Arrigo Prosdocimi, Flávio de Carvalho Júnior and Álvaro José de Oliveira Penna, with 4 points each; and in the twelfth and last position, Juan Bautista Sánchez Palacios, with 1 point. The player João de Souza Mendes Júnior has been inscribed in the tournament but was unable to attend due to work commitments, and was therefore disqualified.

Águas de São Pedro–São Paulo (Brazil), July 1941
	Player	1	2	3	4	5	6	7	8	9	10	11	12	13	14	15	16	17	18	Total
1	Erich Eliskases (GER)	*	1	1	1	1	½	½	½	½	1	1	1	1	1	1	1	1	*	14
2	Carlos Guimard (ARG)	0	*	1	½	1	1	1	1	1	1	1	1	1	½	1	1	1	*	14
3	Paulino Frydman (POL)	0	0	*	½	½	1	1	1	1	½	1	1	1	1	1	1	1	*	12½
4	Ludwig Engels (GER)	0	½	½	*	1	½	½	1	1	1	1	1	1	1	½	1	1	*	12½
5	Markas Luckis (LTU)	0	0	½	0	*	1	1	½	1	1	1	1	½	1	1	1	1	*	11½
6	Mariano Castillo (CHL)	½	0	0	½	0	*	0	1	1	½	1	1	1	1	1	½	1	*	10
7	Aristide Gromer (FRA)	½	0	0	½	0	1	*	½	0	½	½	1	1	1	1	1	1	*	9½
8	Julio Bolbochán (ARG)	½	0	0	0	½	0	½	*	1	½	0	1	1	1	1	½	1	*	8½
9	Boris Schnaiderman (BRA)	½	0	0	0	0	0	1	0	*	½	1	½	½	1	1	1	1	*	8
10	Julio Balparda (URY)	0	0	½	0	0	½	½	½	½	*	0	½	1	0	1	1	1	*	7
11	Julio Salas Romo (CHL)	0	0	0	0	0	0	½	1	0	1	*	0	0	1	1	1	0	*	5½
12	Joaquim Gentil Caetano Netto (BRA)	0	0	0	0	0	0	0	0	½	½	1	*	0	1	½	½	1	*	5
13	José Thiago Mangini (BRA)	0	0	0	0	½	0	0	0	½	0	1	1	*	1	0	0	1	*	5
14	Arrigo Prosdocimi (BRA)	0	½	0	0	0	0	0	0	0	1	0	0	0	*	½	1	1	*	4
15	Flávio de Carvalho Júnior (BRA)	0	0	0	½	0	0	0	0	0	0	0	½	1	½	*	½	1	*	4
16	Álvaro José de Oliveira Penna (BRA)	0	0	0	0	0	½	0	½	0	0	0	½	1	0	½	*	1	*	4
17	Juan Bautista Sánchez Palacios (PAR)	0	0	0	0	0	0	0	0	0	0	1	0	0	0	0	0	*	*	1
18	João de Souza Mendes Júnior (BRA)	*	*	*	*	*	*	*	*	*	*	*	*	*	*	*	*	*	*	0
