= Luis Paulo Supi =

Brazilian chess grandmaster (born 1996)

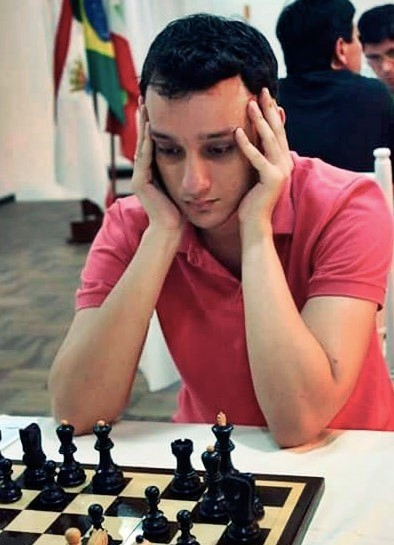
- Supi in 2018

Personal information
- Born: 25 June 1996 (age 30) Catanduva, Brazil

Chess career
- Country: Brazil
- Title: Grandmaster (2018)
- FIDE rating: 2583 (November 2026)
- Peak rating: 2612 (September 2022)

Luis Paulo Supi (Brazilian Portuguese: [luˈis ˈpaw.lu ˈsu.pi]; born 25 June 1996) (Note: Some sources report alternative dates, such as October 10. see: https://ratings.fide.com/crt/main226524.pdf) is a Brazilian chess grandmaster. He became a grandmaster in 2018 by winning Magistral Acre and won the title of Brazilian Chess Champion in 2021. In addition to being a professional player, Supi is content creator on YouTube. He is recognized for having beaten the 16th World Chess Champion, Magnus Carlsen, in an online game.

== Career ==
Born in Catanduva, São Paulo, Supi was awarded the FIDE titles of FIDE Master (FM) and International Master (IM) in 2013 and Grandmaster (GM) in 2018.

In an online blitz tournament hosted by the Internet Chess Club in May 2015, American Grandmaster Hikaru Nakamura accused Supi of cheating (Supi had defeated Nakamura). The tournament judges accepted Nakamura's accusation, reverted the match's result, and banned Supi from the tournament. Brazilian Grandmaster Rafael Leitão wrote in his personal website, "Accusing him of using an engine in this match is absurd. The match is full of tactical mistakes. Nakamura played extremely poorly and, honestly, wouldn't have survived long against any engine given his terrible opening.".

He won the Pan American Junior Championship in 2016 on tiebreak from Kevin Joel Cori Quispe of Peru. Both players had scored 8 points.

In April 2018, he was awarded the title of Grandmaster (GM). He represented Brazil in the 2018 Chess Olympiad, finishing with a score of 6½/10 (+5-2=3) on board three.

Supi vs. Carlsen, Chess.com 2020

Position: c8 black king, d8 black rook, g8 black knight, h8 black rook, b7 black pawn, c7 black pawn, f7 black pawn, g7 black pawn, h7 black pawn, c6 white queen, d6 black bishop, b5 white pawn, f5 black queen, c4 white pawn, d4 black pawn, f4 white bishop, h3 white pawn, a2 white rook, b2 white pawn, f2 white pawn, g2 white pawn, a1 white rook, g1 white king

Final position, black to move

In an online blitz game played in May 2020, Supi defeated Magnus Carlsen in 18 moves after sacrificing his own Queen. In April 2021, Chess.com awarded that game the first spot in their Chess.com Immortal Game Contest.

On 4 November 2021, he became the Brazilian Chess Champion by winning the 87th Brazilian Absolute Chess Championship.

On 23 March 2023, he won the Magistral Milton Matone.

On 7 May 2023, he won the II Rio Chess Open.

On 21 December 2023, he became a two-time Brazilian champion by winning the 89th Brazilian Absolute Chess Championship.

On 21 December 2025, he became a three-time Brazilian champion by winning the 91st Brazilian Absolute Chess Championship.

== Personal Life ==
In December 2023, Supi was in a relationship with chess player Julia Alboredo, who held the titles of Woman International Master (WIM) and FIDE Master (FM) at the time.

Supi and Alboredo also jointly run the Supi&Alboredo chess-training platform, which offers online courses and training programs taught by both players.

== FIDE ratings ==
Elo development
View chart definition.
