= Bernardo Wexler =

Argentine chess player (1925–1988)

Bernardo Wexler (Bucharest, 1 April 1925 – Buenos Aires, 30 June 1988) was an Argentine chess master. He held the only victory over Bobby Fischer in the English Opening.

== Biography ==
Born to Jewish parents in Bucharest, Romania, he emigrated to Argentina at the age of seven. His chess career began after World War II.

In 1951, Wexler tied for 6-7th in Mar del Plata/Buenos Aires (zonal; Erich Eliskases and Julio Bolbochán won). In 1952, he took 2nd, behind Alfredo Rebizzo, in Rosario. In 1952, he tied for 11-13th in Mar del Plata (Bolbochán and Héctor Rossetto won). In 1953, Wexler took 17th in Mar del Plata (Svetozar Gligorić won). In 1954, he tied for 7-9th in Mar del Plata/Buenos Aires (zonal; Oscar Panno won). In 1955, he took 9th in Mar del Plata (Borislav Ivkov won). In 1955, he tied for 4-5th in Buenos Aires (ARG-ch; Miguel Najdorf won). In 1957, he tied for 13-16th in Mar del Plata (Paul Keres won).

In 1959, Wexler won, ahead of Alberto Foguelman, in the 37th Argentine Championship in Buenos Aires. In 1959, he won, followed by Rossetto, Carlos Guimard in Buenos Aires. In 1959, he took 7th in Mar del Plata (Najdorf and Luděk Pachman won). In 1960, he took 5th in Asunción (Gligorić and László Szabó won). In 1960, he took 3rd in Bariloche (Raúl Sanguineti won). In 1960, he took 6th in Mar del Plata (Boris Spassky and Bobby Fischer won). In 1960, he tied for 13-16th in Buenos Aires (Viktor Korchnoi and Samuel Reshevsky won), defeating Fischer.

In 1960, he tied for 3rd-5th in São Paulo (zonal; Bolbochán won). In 1961, he took 3rd, behind Eugênio German and Rodrigo Flores, in São Paulo (zonal; playoff). In 1961, he took 12th in Mar del Plata (Najdorf won). In 1962, he tied for 7-8th in Mar del Plata (Raimundo García won). In 1964, he tied for 12-14th in Buenos Aires (Tigran Petrosian and Keres won). In 1965, he took 3rd in Chacabuco (Jorge Pelikán won).

Wexler played for Argentina in three Chess Olympiads: in 1956, at second reserve board in the 12th Chess Olympiad in Moscow (+1 –3 =0); in 1960, at third board in the 14th Chess Olympiad in Leipzig (+4 –5 =6); in 1964, at fourth board in the 16th Chess Olympiad in Tel Aviv (+6 –2 =5).

Wexler was awarded the International Master title in 1959.

He retired as a court official and died in Buenos Aires on 30 June 1988.
