= Eugênio German =

Brazilian chess player (1930–2001)

Personal information
- Born: Eugênio Maciel German; 24 October 1930 Ubá, Brazil
- Died: 1 April 2001 (aged 70) Belo Horizonte, Brazil

Chess career
- Country: Brazil
- Title: International Master

Eugênio Maciel German (24 October 1930 – 1 April 2001) was a Brazilian International chess master.

German was born in Ubá, Brazil. In 1949, Eugênio German won a match against Jayme Schreibman Moses in Belo Horizonte (+2 –1 =1). In 1949, he tied for 3rd-4th in Rio de Janeiro (17th BRA-ch; Walter Cruz won). In 1950, he tied for 5-6th in Rio de Janeiro (18th BRA-ch; Jose Thiago Mangini won). In 1951, he won the Brazilian Chess Championship in Fortaleza (19th BRA-ch). In 1951/52, he took 4th in San Rafael (Erich Eliskases won). In 1952, he tied for 7-8th in Mar del Plata (Julio Bolbochán and Héctor Rossetto won). In 1952, he tied for 2nd-3rd, behind Flavio de Carvalho Jr, in São Paulo (20th BRA-ch).

In 1960, he won in Belo Horizonte (pre-zonal). In 1960, he tied for 3rd-5th in São Paulo (zonal; Julio Bolbochán won). In 1961, he won, ahead of Rodrigo Flores and Bernardo Wexler, in São Paulo (zonal playoff). In 1962, he tied for 19-20th in the Stockholm Interzonal. In 1963, he won in Belo Horizonte. In 1965, he won in Belo Horizonte. In 1972, he won in Blumenau (39th BRA-ch).

Eugenio German played for Brazil in three Chess Olympiads.

- In 1952, at first board in the 10th Chess Olympiad in Helsinki (+6 –2 =3);
- In 1968, at second board in the 18th Chess Olympiad in Lugano (+5 –7 =3);
- In 1972, at first board in the 20th Chess Olympiad in Skopje (+8 –4 =8).

Awarded the International Master title in 1952, he was first Brazilian to be made an IM by FIDE.
