= Oswaldo Cruz Filho =

Brazilian chess player

Oswaldo Cruz Filho (1902/03 in Rio de Janeiro – ?) was a Brazilian medical doctor, microbiologist, and chess master.

He represented Brazil in 3rd unofficial Chess Olympiad at Munich 1936, in the 8th Chess Olympiad at Buenos Aires 1939 and the 10th Chess Olympiad at Helsinki 1952.

He participated in many tournaments played in Rio de Janeiro; shared 3rd with Walter Oswaldo Cruz in 1943 (Campeonato do CXRJ, Erich Eliskases won), took 2nd in 1943 (Quadrangular Clube Ginastico Portugues, Eliskases won), took 9th in 1946 (Miguel Najdorf won), took 2nd, behind W. Cruz, in 1948 (the 16th Brazilian Chess Championship), tied for 11-12th in 1949 (BRA-ch, W. Cruz won), took 10th in 1950 (BRA-ch, J.T. Mangini won), and took 11th in 1952 (the 1st Torneio Internacional do Fluminense F.C., Héctor Rossetto won).
