= Roberto Junio Brito Molina =

Brazilian chess player (born 1985)

Personal information
- Born: July 12, 1985 (age 41) Belo Horizonte, Brazil

Chess career
- Country: Brazil
- Title: International Master (2010)
- Peak rating: 2469 (March 2019)

Roberto Junio Brito Molina is a Brazilian chess player.

== Career ==
He began his training at the age of 12 under Julio Lapertosa and became a coach at the Casa do Xadrez chess club in 2010.

In 2018, he won the Brazilian Chess Championship, defeating grandmaster Krikor Mekhitarian in the final round.

In March 2021, he defeated Levy Rozman in the finals of the I'M Not A GM Speed Chess Championship, becoming the IMSCC champion.
