= Walter Cruz =

Brazilian chess player (1910–1967)

Walter Oswaldo Cruz (23 January 1910, in Petropolis – 3 January 1967, in Rio de Janeiro) was a Brazilian chess master.

He was six-time Brazilian Champion (1938, 1940, 1942, 1948, 1949, 1953) and thrice Sub-Champion (1928, 1929, 1939). He played for Brazil in the 8th Chess Olympiad at Buenos Aires 1939 (third board, +4 –7 =5).

== Chess career ==
He took 9th at Mar del Plata 1928 (South American Chess Championship, Torneo Sulamericano, Roberto Grau won). He won at Rio de Janeiro 1938 (Torneio Nacional de Seleção), took 7th in the Montevideo 1938 chess tournament at Carrasco (Torneio Sulamericano, Alexander Alekhine won).

During World War II, he won at Rio de Janeiro 1940 (Torneio Nacional de Seleção), took 4th in the New York State Chess Association Championship at Hamilton 1940, tied for 7-8th at Hamilton 1941 (NYSCA, Reuben Fine won), shared 3rd with Oswaldo Cruz Filho at Rio de Janeiro 1943 (Campeonato do CXRJ, Erich Eliskases won), took 3rd at Rio de Janeiro (Quadrangular Clube Ginástico Português, Eliskases won), tied for 9-10th in the 1st Pan-American Championship at Hollywood 1945 (Samuel Reshevsky won).

After the war, he tied for 3rd-4th at Rio de Janeiro 1946 (Alekhine Memorial, Eliskases won), took 3rd at Rio de Janeiro 1946 (it, Miguel Najdorf won), took 15th at Mar del Plata 1947 (it, Najdorf won), took 3rd at Rio de Janeiro 1947 (Campeonato do CXRJ), finished 4th at Rio de Janeiro 1948 (it), won at Rio de Janeiro 1949 (Campeonato Carioca), tied for 11-13th at Mar del Plata 1949 (Héctor Rossetto won), shared 12th at Rio de Janeiro 1952 (Rossetto won), took 13th at Mar del Plata / Buenos Aires 1954 (the 2nd Torneio Zonal Sulamericano, Oscar Panno won), and took 16th at Rio de Janeiro 1957 (the 3rd Torneio Zonal Sulamericano, Panno won).
