= Adhemar da Silva Rocha =

Brazilian chess player

Adhemar da Silva de Oliveira Rocha (2 July 1908, Valença, Rio de Janeiro – 14 November 1975, Rio de Janeiro) was a Brazilian chess player.

He tied for 6-10th at Buenos Aires 1934/35 (the 5th South American Chess Championship, Torneo Sudamericano, Luis Piazzini won), took 4th in the Montevideo 1938 chess tournament (the 8th Torneio Sulamericano, Alexander Alekhine won), and was awarded the Brazilian Champion title for 1941.

Da Silva Rocha represented Brazil in the 3rd unofficial Chess Olympiad at Munich 1936 and in the 8th Chess Olympiad at Buenos Aires 1939.

Adhemar da Silva Rocha won the Rio de Janeiro State chess tournament in the years 1934, 1935 and 1937. He died on 14 November 1975 of cardiac arrest, while walking around downtown Rio de Janeiro.
