= Regina Lúcia Ribeiro =

Brazilian chess player (born 1961)

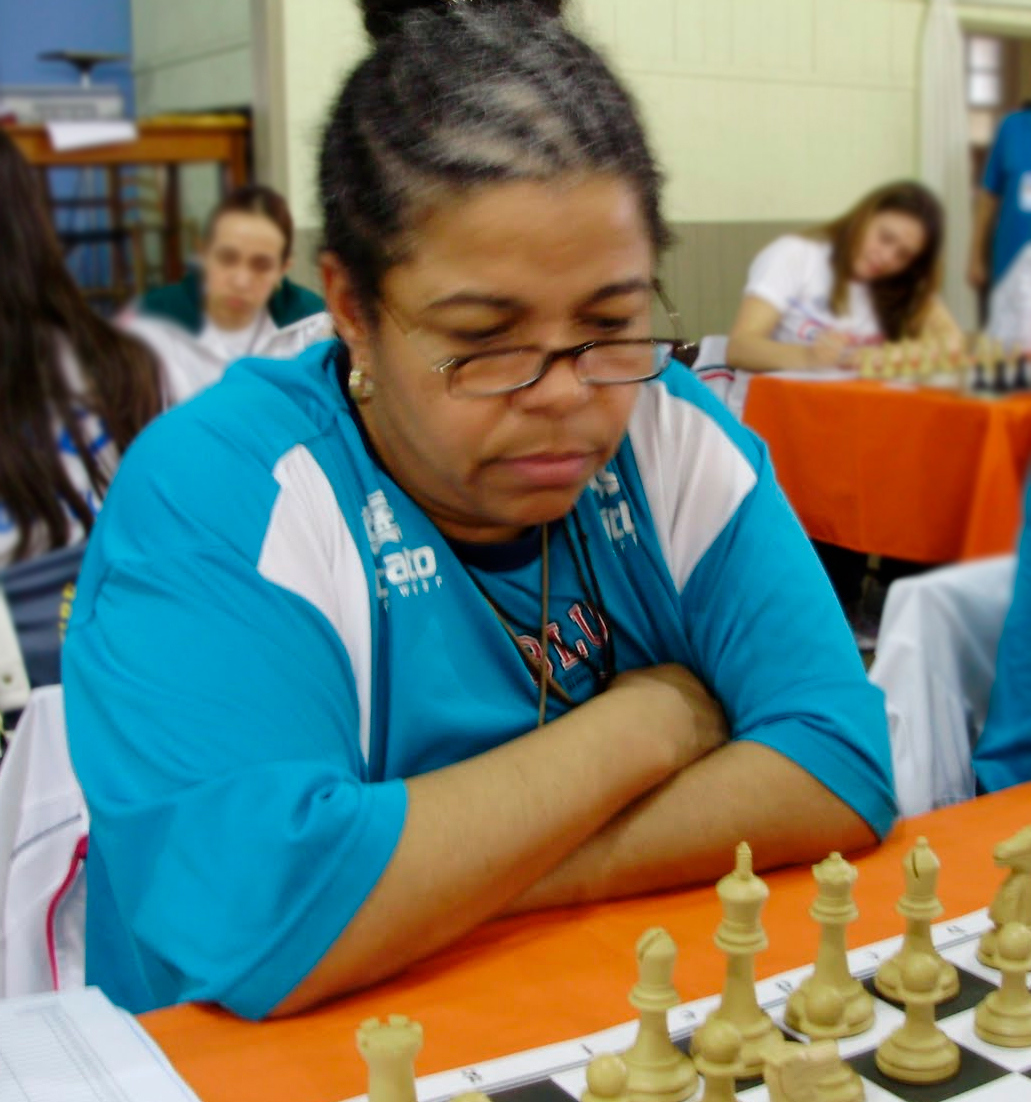
- Regina Lúcia Ribeiro in 2010

Personal information
- Born: 19 December 1961 (age 64) Blumenau, Brazil

Chess career
- Country: Brazil
- Title: Woman International Master (1985)
- Peak rating: 2112 (July 2008)

Regina Lúcia Ribeiro (born 19 December 1961) is a Brazilian chess Woman International Master (1985), eight-times Brazilian Women's Chess Championships winner (1982, 1984, 1985, 1987, 1990, 1991, 2003, 2006).

== Chess career ==
Regina Lúcia Ribeiro competed many times in the individual finals of the Brazilian Women's Chess Championship and eight times won this tournament: 1982 (shared 1st place with Jussara Chaves), 1984, 1985, 1987, 1990, 1991, 2003 and 2006. Also she won 2 silver medals in Brazilian Women's Chess Championship: in 1986 and 2004

Regina Lúcia Ribeiro four times participated in Women's World Chess Championship South American Zonal tournaments:

- in 1985, in São Paulo shared 3rd-4th place;
- in 1987, in San Juan ranked in 6th place;
- in 1993, in Brasília ranked in 2nd place;
- in 2001, in São Paulo ranked in 4th place.

Regina Lúcia Ribeiro played for Brazil in the Women's Chess Olympiads:

- In 1982, at second board in the 10th Chess Olympiad (women) in Lucerne (+4, =3, -5),
- In 1984, at first board in the 26th Chess Olympiad (women) in Thessaloniki (+5, =3, -6),
- In 1986, at second board in the 27th Chess Olympiad (women) in Dubai (+4, =3, -4),
- In 1988, at second board in the 28th Chess Olympiad (women) in Thessaloniki (+1, =3, -6),
- In 1992, at third board in the 30th Chess Olympiad (women) in Manila (+8, =2, -2) and won individual bronze medal,
- In 1994, at first reserve board in the 31st Chess Olympiad (women) in Moscow (+6, =3, -1),
- In 2000, at third in the 34th Chess Olympiad (women) in Istanbul (+3, =2, -6),
- In 2004, at second board in the 36th Chess Olympiad (women) in Calvià (+4, =5, -2),
- In 2006, at first board in the 37th Chess Olympiad (women) in Turin (+2, =4, -3),
- In 2014, at fourth board in the 41st Chess Olympiad (women) in Tromsø (+1, =1, -6).

In 1985, she awarded the FIDE Women International Master (WIM) title.

== Literature ==
Ribeiro, Regina (2000). Xadrez Para Crianças: A História Do Xadrez. [S.l.]: Brasil Leitura. ISBN 8573980877
