= Julio Balparda =

Uruguayan chess player (1900–1942)

- Born: 1900; Uruguay
- Died: 9 July 1942 (aged 41–42); Montevideo
- Occupations: chess player, athlete
- Awards: Uruguayan Chess Championship; South American Chess Championship

Julio César Balparda Muró (c. 1900 – 9 July 1942 in Montevideo) was a Uruguayan chess master.

He won the Uruguayan Chess Championship three times (1929, 1934, and 1936). He played several times in the South American Chess Championship; tied for 10-12th at Mar del Plata 1928 (I Magistral Ciudad de Mar del Plata, III Campeonato Sudamericano, Roberto Grau won), tied for 3rd-6th at Mar del Plata 1934 (Aaron Schwartzman won), took 17th at Buenos Aires 1934/35 (Luis Piazzini won), took 15th at Mar del Plata 1936 (Isaías Pleci won), took 14th at São Paulo 1937 (Rodrigo Flores won), and took 11th at Montevideo (Carrasco) 1938 (Alexander Alekhine won).

In his last international tournaments, he took 5th place at Montevideo 1941, and 10th at Aguas de Sao Pedro/São Paulo 1941, both won by Erich Eliskases.
