= South American Chess Championship =

International chess tournament

The first South American Chess Championship (Torneo Sudamericano, Torneio Sulamericano) was held in Montevideo (Carrasco), Uruguay, on December 25, 1921 – January 22, 1922. The eighteen-player single round-robin tournament was won by Roberto Grau 14/17, followed by Benito Villegas, Valentin Fernandez Coria and Rolando Illa, all got 12.5/17, etc.

The Torneio Sulamericano was replaced in 1951 by the Torneio Zonal Sulamericano, except for 1962 (*) when the Torneo Latino-americano was played.

== Winners ==
Year	City	Winner
1921/22	Montevideo	Roberto Grau (Argentina)
1925	Montevideo	Luis Palau (Argentina)
1928	Mar del Plata	Roberto Grau (Argentina)
1934	Mar del Plata	Aaron Schwartzman (Argentina)
1934/35	Buenos Aires	Luis Piazzini (Argentina)
1936	Mar del Plata	Isaías Pleci (Argentina)
1937	São Paulo	Rodrigo Flores (Chile)
1938	Montevideo	Alexander Alekhine (France)
1951	Mar del Plata /Buenos Aires	Erich Eliskases (Argentina); Julio Bolbochán (Argentina)
1954	Mar del Plata /Buenos Aires	Oscar Panno (Argentina)
1957	Rio de Janeiro	Oscar Panno (Argentina)
1960	São Paulo	Julio Bolbochán (Argentina)
1962 (*)	Mar del Plata	Raimundo García (Argentina)
1963	Fortaleza	Héctor Rossetto (Argentina)
1966	Buenos Aires/ Termas de Rio Hondo	Henrique Mecking (Brazil); Julio Bolbochán (Argentina); Oscar Panno (Argentina); Alberto Foguelman (Argentina)
1969	Mar del Plata	Miguel Najdorf (Argentina); Oscar Panno (Argentina)
1972	São Paulo	Henrique Mecking (Brazil)
1975	Fortaleza	Raúl Sanguineti (Argentina)
1978	Tramandaí	Francisco Trois (Brazil)
1982	Moron	Miguel Quinteros (Argentina)
1985	Corrientes	Miguel Quinteros (Argentina); Ivan Morovic (Chile)
1987	Santiago	Gilberto Milos Jr (Brazil)
1989	São Paulo	Jaime Sunye Neto (Brazil); Herman Claudius van Riemsdijk (Brazil)
1993	Brasília	Julio Granda Zúñiga (Peru)
1995	São Paulo	Julio Granda Zúñiga (Peru)
1998	São Paulo	Gilberto Milos Jr (Brazil); Rafael Leitão (Brazil); Jaime Sunye Neto (Brazil)
2000	São Paulo	Darcy Lima (Brazil)
2001	São Paulo	Giovanni Vescovi (Brazil)
2003	São Paulo	Darcy Lima (Brazil)
2005	São Paulo	Gilberto Milos Jr (Brazil)
2007	São Paulo	Gilberto Milos Jr (Brazil); Rafael Leitão (Brazil)
