= Márcio Miranda =

Brazilian chess player (born 1942)

Personal information
- Born: 16 July 1942 (age 83)

Chess career
- Country: Brazil
- Title: FIDE Master (1997)
- Peak rating: 2318 (July 1999)

Marcio Marcos do Carmo Miranda (born 16 July 1942) is a Brazilian chess FIDE master (FM), Brazilian Chess Championship winner (1974).

== Biography ==
In the 1960s and 1970s Márcio Miranda was one of Brazil's leading chess players. He won two medals in Brazilian Chess Championships: gold (1974, shared 1st place with Alexandru Segal) and bronze (1966).

Márcio Miranda played for Brazil in the Chess Olympiad:

- In 1968, at first reserve board in the 18th Chess Olympiad in Lugano (+1, =2, -5).
