= Ronald Câmara =

Brazilian chess player

Personal information
- Born: 11 April 1927 Fortaleza, Brazil
- Died: 29 June 2015 (aged 88) Fortaleza, Brazil

Chess career
- Country: Brazil

Ronald Câmara (11 April 1927 – 29 June 2015) was a Brazilian chess player, two times Brazilian Chess Championship winner (1960, 1961), FIDE International Arbitr, chess writer and administrator.

== Biography ==
In the 1960s Ronald Câmara was one of Brazil's leading chess players. He twice won Brazilian Chess Championships in 1960 and 1961. Ronald Câmara twice participated in World Chess Championships South American Zonal tournaments (1960, 1963). Also he twice won Brazil state Ceará Chess Championship (1952, 1960).

Ronald Câmara was member of the panel of judges of the 1972 and 1986 Chess Olympiads, and chief arbiter of the World Junior Chess Championship in 1978. He was Vice President of the Brazilian Chess Confederation (1970-1976) and President of the FIDE South American Zone (1974-1978).

Ronald Câmara was author of a number of chess articles in the journals O Povo and Diário do Nordeste (1979-1989).

Ronald Câmara graduated from the Faculty of Law of the Federal University of Ceara (1952). He was Banco do Brasil employee.

Ronald Câmara was oldest brother of Brazilian chess master Hélder Câmara and nephew of Brazilian Catholic archbishop Hélder Câmara.
