= Montevideo 1938 chess tournament =

The eighth South American Chess Championship (Torneo Sudamericano) took place in Montevideo, Uruguay, from 7th to 25 March 1938. The event was held in an elegant seaside resort Carrasco, one of the most expensive neighborhoods in Montevideo, located on the city's southeast coast.

The results and standings:

Montevideo (Carrasco) 1938
#	Player	1	2	3	4	5	6	7	8	9	10	11	12	13	14	15	16	Total
1	Alexander Alekhine (France)	x	½	1	1	½	1	½	1	1	½	1	1	1	1	1	1	13.0
2	Carlos Guimard (Argentina)	½	x	1	1	0	½	1	1	0	1	1	1	½	1	1	1	11.5
3	Virgilio Fenoglio (Argentina)	0	0	x	0	1	1	1	½	½	1	1	½	1	1	1	1	10.5
4	Adhemar da Silva Rocha (Brazil)	0	0	1	x	1	1	½	1	½	½	1	½	½	½	1	½	9.5
5	Carlos Maderna (Argentina)	½	1	0	0	x	0	1	0	½	1	½	1	1	½	1	1	9.0
6	Roberto Grau (Argentina)	0	½	0	0	1	x	½	1	½	0	1	1	½	1	1	1	9.0
7	Walter Cruz (Brazil)	½	0	0	½	0	½	x	½	½	1	½	½	1	½	1	1	8.0
8	Rodrigo Flores (Chile)	0	0	½	0	1	0	½	x	0	1	½	½	1	½	1	1	7.5
9	Octavio Trompowsky (Brazil)	0	1	½	½	½	½	½	1	x	½	1	½	0	½	0	0	7.0
10	Alfredo Olivera (Uruguay)	½	0	0	½	0	1	0	0	½	x	½	½	1	1	½	½	6.5
11	Julio Balparda (Uruguay)	0	0	0	0	½	0	½	½	0	½	x	1	½	1	0	1	5.5
12	Armando Salles Oliveira (Brazil)	0	0	½	½	0	0	½	½	½	½	0	x	½	½	1	0	5.0
13	José Cánepa (Uruguay)	0	½	0	½	0	½	0	0	1	0	½	½	x	½	0	1	5.0
14	René Letelier (Chile)	0	0	0	½	½	0	½	½	½	0	0	½	½	x	½	1	5.0
15	Ernesto Rotunno (Uruguay)	0	0	0	0	0	0	0	0	1	½	1	0	1	½	x	½	4.5
16	Rafael Bensadon (Argentina)	0	0	0	½	0	0	0	0	1	½	0	1	0	0	½	x	3.5
