= Flávio de Carvalho Jr. =

Brazilian chess player (1916–1990)

Personal information
- Born: 4 November 1916
- Died: 4 June 1990 (aged 73)

Chess career
- Country: Brazil

Flávio de Carvalho Jr. (4 November 1916 – 4 June 1990) was a Brazilian chess player. He was a Brazilian Chess Champion (1952).

== Biography ==
From the end to 1940s to the early 1960s Flávio de Carvalho Jr. was one of the leading Brazilian chess players. Flávio de Carvalho jr. has participated in many Brazilian Chess Championships where he won gold medal in 1952. In 1960 he represented Brazil in World Chess Championship South America Zonal tournaments. Flávio de Carvalho jr. was participated in several major international chess tournaments which took place in South America. In 1955-1956 he together with Marcio Elisio Freitas published the chess magazine Xadrez ("Chess").

Flávio de Carvalho Jr. played for Brazil in the Chess Olympiad:

- In 1952, at fourth board in the 10th Chess Olympiad in Helsinki (+3, =3, -3).
