= Ivone Moysés =

Brazilian chess player (1945–2018)

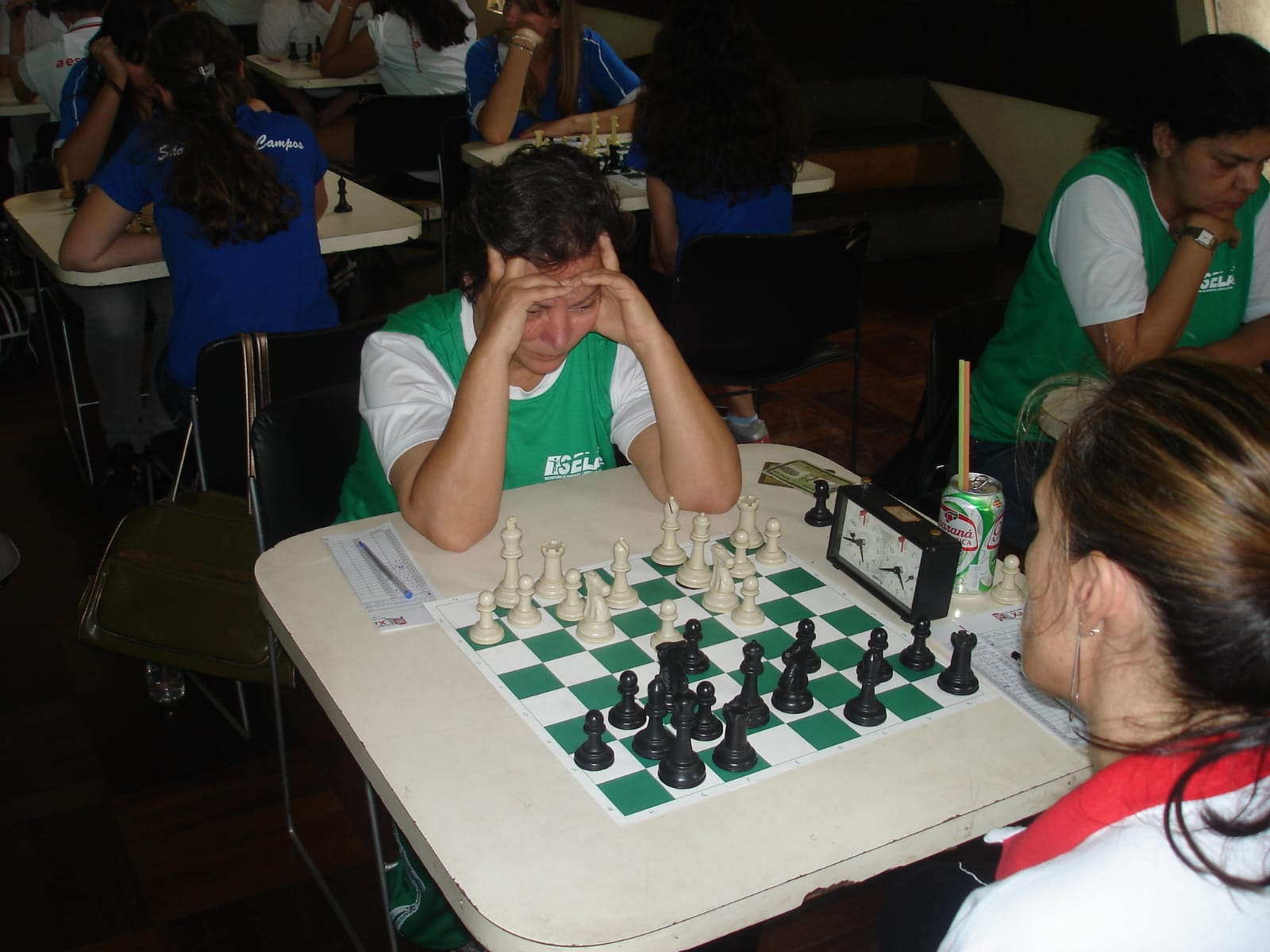

Personal information
- Born: 1945
- Died: 22 October 2018 (aged 72–73)

Chess career
- Country: Brazil
- FIDE rating: 2087 (May 2010)
- Peak rating: 2091 (January 2004)

Ivone Moysés (1945 – 22 October 2018) was a Brazilian chess player. She was a three time Brazilian Women's Chess Champion (1969, 1970, 1973) and Women's Chess Olympiad individual silver medalist (1974).

== Biography ==
From the end of 1960s until the end of the 1970s, Ivone Moysés was one of the leading Brazilian chess players. She has participated in many Brazilian Women's Chess Championships where she won three gold (1969, 1970, 1973) and four silver (1967, 1968, 1976, 1977) medals.

Ivone Moysés three times participated in the Women's World Chess Championship South American Zonal Tournaments:

- in 1969 in Mar del Plata she ranked in 5th place;
- in 1972 in São Paulo she shared 4th–6th place;
- in 1978 in Brasília she ranked in 7th place.

Ivone Moysés played for Brazil in the Women's Chess Olympiads:

- In 1972, at first reserve board in the 5th Chess Olympiad (women) in Skopje (+2, =1, -5),
- In 1974, at second board in the 6th Chess Olympiad (women) in Medellín (+6, =2, -1) and won individual silver medal.
