= Tatiana Ratcu =

Brazilian chess player (born 1979)

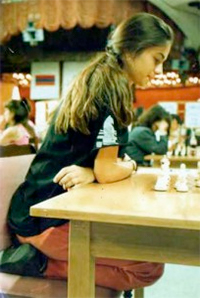
- Ratcu in 1996

Personal information
- Born: Tatiana Kaawar Ratcu; 8 September 1979 (age 46) São Paulo, Brazil

Chess career
- Country: Brazil
- Title: Woman International Master (1995)
- Peak rating: 2259 (January 2001)

Tatiana Kaawar Ratcu (born 8 September 1979) is a Brazilian chess player who holds the FIDE title of Woman International Master (WIM, 1995). She is a five time Brazilian Women's Chess Champion (1994, 1995, 1996, 1997, 2000).

== Biography ==
In the end of the 1990s, Ratcu was one of the leading Brazilian female chess players. She three times won the Brazilian Youth Chess Championships in the Girl's U16 age group (1992, 1993, 1994) and twice won Girl's U18 age group (1996, 1997). Also she twice won Brazilian Girl's Junior Chess Championships (1996, 1998). Ratcu five times won five times Brazilian Women's Chess Championships: 1994, 1995, 1996, 1997 and 2000. In 1995, Ratcu participated in Women's World Chess Championship Interzonal Tournament in Chişinău where ranked 43rd place. In 1998, in Rio de Janeiro she won the 1st World Junior Team Chess Championship with the Brazilian team.

Ratcu played for Brazil in the Women's Chess Olympiads:

- In 1996, at first board in the 32nd Chess Olympiad (women) in Yerevan (+7, =2, -5),
- In 1998, at first board in the 33rd Chess Olympiad (women) in Elista (+2, =6, -4),
- In 2000, at first board in the 34th Chess Olympiad (women) in Istanbul (+6, =5, -1).

In 1995, she was awarded the FIDE Woman International Master (WIM) title.

Since the early 2000s, Ratcu rarely participated in chess tournaments.
