= Julia Alboredo =

Brazilian chess player (born 1997)

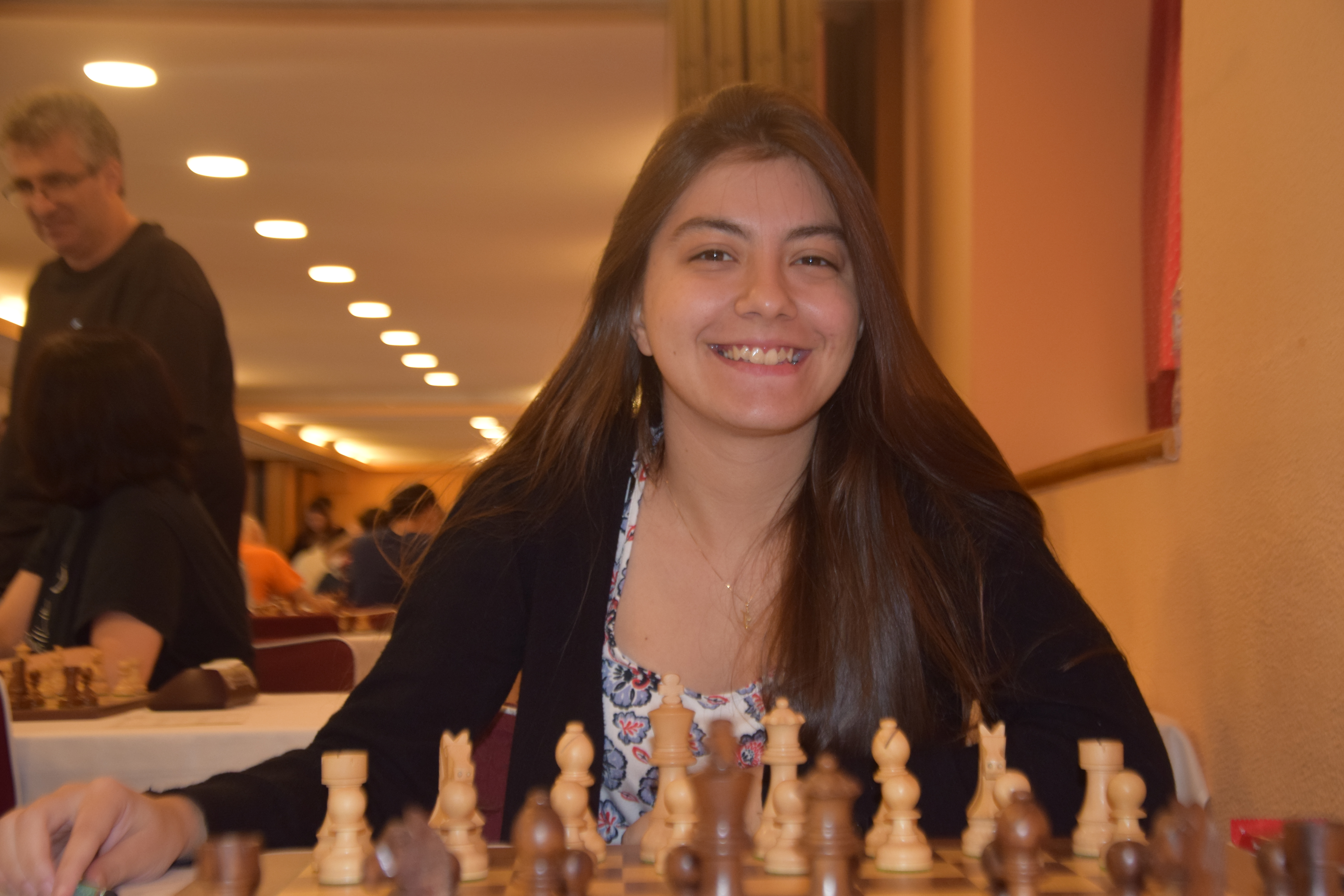
- Alboredo at the 2018 Andorra open

Personal information
- Born: 12 January 1997 (age 29) São Paulo, Brazil

Chess career
- Country: Brazil
- Title: FIDE Master (2022); Woman International Master (2022)
- FIDE rating: 2263 (September 2022)
- Peak rating: 2290 (August 2022)

Julia Alboredo (born 12 January 1997) is a Brazilian chess player. She was awarded the title of Woman International Master in 2022. Alboredo is the 2020 Brazilian women's champion.

== Chess career ==
She has represented Brazil in the Chess Olympiad:

- In 2016, scoring 4/9 on board two.
- In 2018, scoring 4½/10 on board two.
- In 2022, scoring 7/11 on board one.
- In 2024, scoring 8/11 on board three.
- In 2026, scoring 6½/10 on board three.

She qualified for the Women's Chess World Cup 2021 after finishing second in the Brazilian Chess Championship after winner Juliana Sayumi Terao declined the invitation. She was defeated 1½-½ in the first round by Jolanta Zawadzka.

== See also ==
- List of female chess players
