= Francisco Trois =

Brazilian chess player (1946–2020)

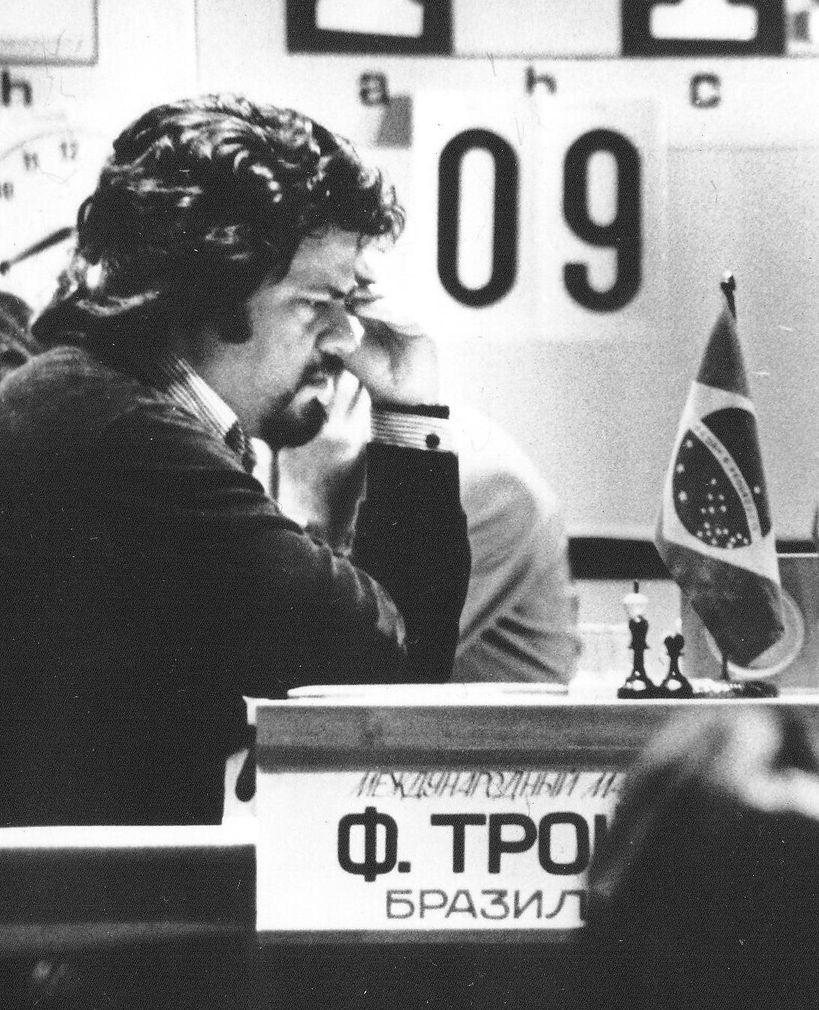
- Trois playing at Riga Interzonal, Latvia, 1978.

Personal information
- Born: September 3, 1946 Canoas, Brazil
- Died: September 6, 2020 (aged 74)

Chess career
- Country: Brazil
- Title: International Master (1978)
- Peak rating: 2430 (July 1984)

Francisco Trois (3 September 1946 – 16 September 2020) was a Brazilian chess International Master and International Arbiter (1986). He was born in Canoas, and won the South American Chess Championship in 1978, in Tramandai, in the state of Rio Grande do Sul, Brazil. He qualified for the Riga Interzonal in 1979, but finished with a disappointing result of +2 =6 -9. However, his two victories from that tournament were against strong grandmasters Florin Gheorghiu and Gennady Kuzmin. He represented Brazil in the Chess Olympiads in 1972, 1978 and 1982.
