= João de Souza Mendes =

Brazilian chess player

Personal information
- Born: João de Souza Mendes Júnior; 23 June 1892 Angra do Heroísmo, Portugal
- Died: 10 July 1969 (aged 77) Rio de Janeiro, Brazil

Chess career
- Country: Portugal; Brazil

João de Souza Mendes Júnior (23 June 1892 – 10 July 1969) was a Brazilian chess champion and physician. A seven-time Brazilian national champion, Souza Mendes was Brazil's most accomplished (given the span of his dominance) chess playe prior to the emergence of Henrique Mecking.

Born in the Azores, Portugal, Souza Mendes played in the Brazilian Chess Championship 29 times, winning in 1927 (the first year the tournament was held), 1928, 1929, 1930, 1943, 1954, and 1958. He finished second five times, the last time in 1965 at age 73 when thirteen-year-old Henrique Mecking won, and took third five times.

He played for Brazil in Chess Olympiads at Buenos Aires 1939 and Helsinki 1952.

Souza Mendes died in Rio de Janeiro.
