= Jaime Sunye Neto =

Brazilian chess grandmaster (born 1957)

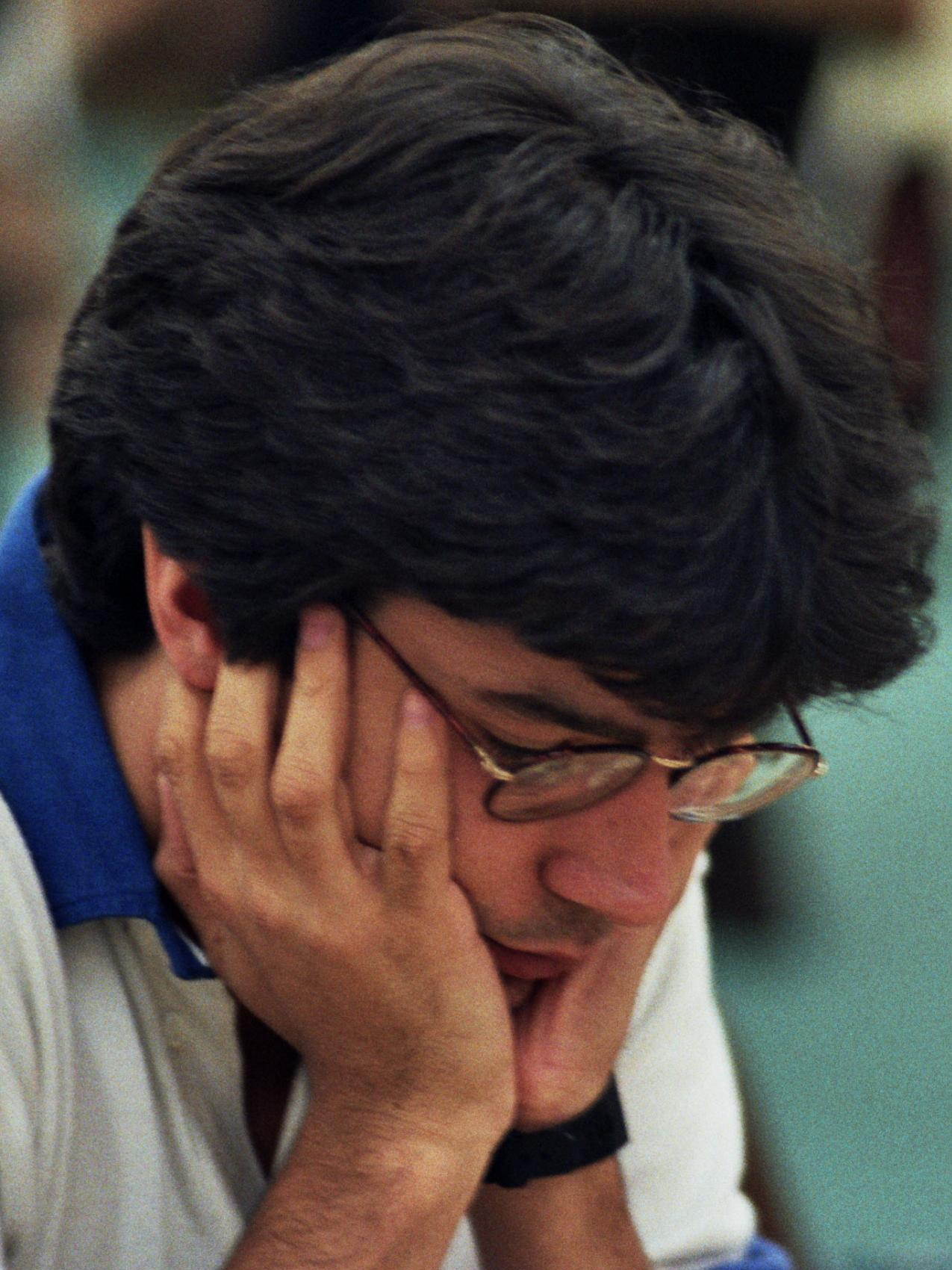
- At the Thessaloniki 1984 Olympiad

Personal information
- Born: May 2, 1957 (age 69) Curitiba, Brazil

Chess career
- Country: Brazil
- Title: Grandmaster (1986)
- Peak rating: 2558 (July 2000)
- Peak ranking: No. 78 (July 1986)

Jaime Sunye Neto (born May 2, 1957) is a Brazilian chess player. Awarded the International Master title in 1980 and the Grandmaster title in 1986, he was Brazilian champion seven times, in 1976, 1977, 1979, 1980, 1981, 1982 and 1983 (jointly with Marcos Paolozzi). Sunye Neto was also president of the Brazilian Chess Confederation from 1988 to 1992.

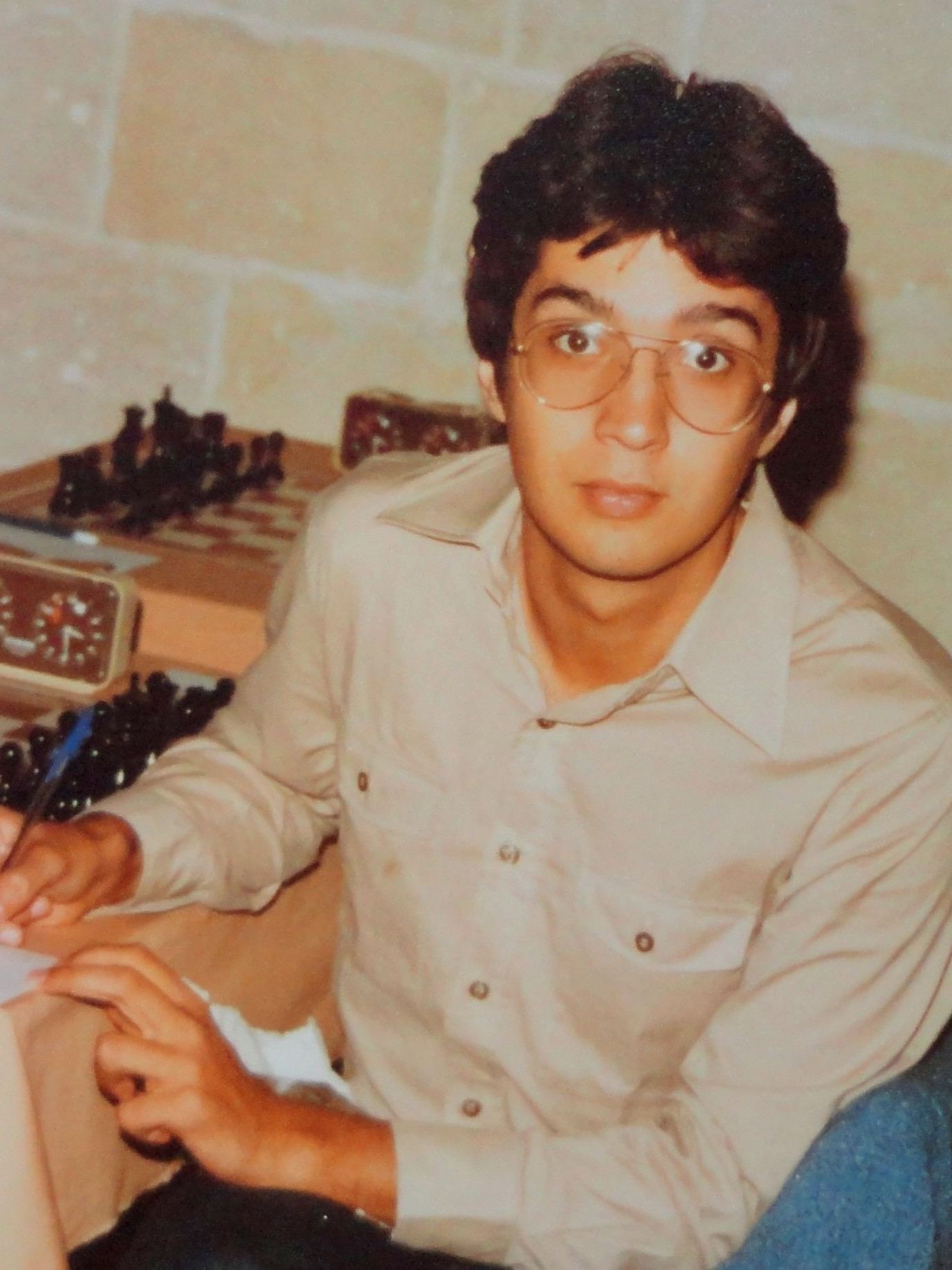
Jaim Sunye Neto, 1980 at the 24th Chess Olympiad

In 1979 he was invited to play in the Interzonal in Rio de Janeiro as a second representative of the host nation. Untitled at the time, he delivered one of the best performances of his career, finishing =fifth overall (tied with Borislav Ivkov) and defeating several grandmasters, including the tournament winner Lajos Portisch. In 1989 he won the South American Chess Championship, which was also the South American Zonal, and qualified for the 1990 Interzonal, where he finished equal 29th–39th out of 64 players.

Other best results were joint second place at Havana 1985, and first at Zenica 1986. From 1978 to 1986 he was a mainstay on the Brazilian team at the Chess Olympiad.

== Campaign for FIDE presidency ==
In 1996, Sunye Neto ran for president of FIDE. He assembled a powerful team and won the support of almost all of the chess playing countries of Europe. However he lost to incumbent Kirsan Ilyumzhinov by 87 votes to 44. The German delegate suggested gifts were used by Ilyumzhinov to influence the vote.
