= Joara Chaves =

Brazilian chess player (born 1962)

Personal information
- Born: 22 March 1962 (age 64) São Paulo, Brazil

Chess career
- Country: Brazil
- Title: Woman International Master (1985)
- FIDE rating: 1901 (January 2020)
- Peak rating: 2130 (July 1987)

Joara Chaves (born 22 March 1962) is a Brazilian chess player who holds the FIDE title of Woman International Master (WIM, 1985). She is a four-time Brazilian Women's Chess Championship winner.

== Biography ==
Chaves is the younger sister of Brazilian chess master Jussara Chaves. From the early 1980s until the end of the 2000s, she was one of the leading Brazilian chess players. She has participated in many Brazilian Women's Chess Championships where she won four gold (1991, 1998, 2002, 2008) and six silver (1984, 1985, 1988, 1993, 1997, 1999) medals. In 1987, she participated in the Women's World Chess Championship Interzonal Tournament in Smederevska Palanka and ranked 15th place.

She has represented Brazil in numerous Women's Chess Olympiads:

- In 1982, at third board in the 10th Chess Olympiad (women) in Lucerne (+6, =2, -4),
- In 1984, at second board in the 26th Chess Olympiad (women) in Thessaloniki (+3, =5, -6),
- In 1986, at first reserve board in the 27th Chess Olympiad (women) in Dubai (+2, =3, -2),
- In 1988, at first reserve board in the 28th Chess Olympiad (women) in Thessaloniki (+4, =3, -1),
- In 1990, at third board in the 29th Chess Olympiad (women) in Novi Sad (+4, =8, -0),
- In 1992, at first board in the 30th Chess Olympiad (women) in Manila (+3, =2, -5),
- In 1994, at first board in the 31st Chess Olympiad (women) in Moscow (+1, =3, -5),
- In 1996, at second board in the 32nd Chess Olympiad (women) in Yerevan (+3, =3, -5),
- In 1998, at second board in the 33rd Chess Olympiad (women) in Elista (+5, =5, -2),
- In 2000, at first reserve board in the 34th Chess Olympiad (women) in Istanbul (+2, =3, -3),
- In 2002, at third board in the 35th Chess Olympiad (women) in Bled (+5, =3, -3),
- In 2004, at third board in the 36th Chess Olympiad (women) in Calvià (+4, =1, -5),
- In 2006, at third board in the 37th Chess Olympiad (women) in Turin (+4, =2, -4),
- In 2008, at third board in the 38th Chess Olympiad (women) in Dresden (+6, =1, -2),
- In 2014, at third board in the 41st Chess Olympiad (women) in Tromsø (+4, =2, -2).

In 1985, she received the FIDE title of Woman International Master (WIM). She is also a FIDE International Arbiter (1993).
