= Lígia Maria de Abreu Carvalho =

Brazilian chess player

Personal information
- Born: 1957 São Paulo, Brazil
- Died: 1993 (aged 35–36)

Chess career
- Country: Brazil

Lígia Maria de Abreu Carvalho (1957 – 1993) was a Brazilian chess player, three-times Brazilian Women's Chess Championships winner (1978, 1979, 1980).

== Chess career ==
Lígia Maria de Abreu Carvalho, from São Paulo, was the daughter of Adriano Salles Toledo Carvalho and Maria Noêmia Abreu Carvalho, and sister of chess player, journalist and writer Herbert Abreu de Carvalho, director of the Chess League and Brazilian Chess Championship runner-up in 1980.

Lígia Maria de Abreu Carvalho competed many times in the individual finals of the Brazilian Women's Chess Championship and three times in row won this tournament: from 1978 to 1980. In 1978 and 1980 she won São Paulo Women's Chess Championships. In 1982, in Morón she participated in Women's World Chess Championship South American Zonal tournament and ranked in 6th place.

Lígia Maria de Abreu Carvalho played for Brazil in the Women's Chess Olympiad:

- In 1980, at first board in the 9th Chess Olympiad (women) in Valletta (+4, =5, -3).

Lígia Maria de Abreu Carvalho graduated in literature from the University of São Paulo.
