= José Pinto Paiva =

Brazilian chess player (1938–2024)

Personal information
- Born: 16 July 1938 Salvador, Bahia, Brazil
- Died: 2 December 2024 (aged 86)

Chess career
- Country: Brazil

José Pinto Paiva (16 July 1938 – 2 December 2024) was a Brazilian chess player, two times Brazilian Chess Championship winner (1966, 1971).

== Biography ==
From the mid-1960s to mid-1970s, Paiva was one of Brazil's leading chess players. He won two gold (1966, 1971), two silver (1967, 1969) and bronze (1965) medals in Brazilian Chess Championships. In 1972 José Pinto Paiva participated in World Chess Championships South American Zonal tournament.

Paiva played for Brazil in the Chess Olympiads:

- In 1968, at second reserve board in the 18th Chess Olympiad in Lugano (+1, =0, -4),
- In 1970, at second reserve board in the 19th Chess Olympiad in Siegen (+3, =3, -2).

Paiva died on 2 December 2024, at the age of 86.
