= Maria Cristina de Oliveira =

Brazilian chess player

Personal information
- Full name: Maria Cristina Borges de Oliveira
- Born: 29 August 1959 (age 66) Belo Horizonte, Brazil

Chess career
- Country: Brazil
- Title: Woman International Master (1977)
- Peak rating: 2130 (January 1987)

Maria Cristina Borges de Oliveira (born 29 August 1959) is a Brazilian chess player who holds the FIDE title of Woman International Master (WIM, 1977). She is a two-time Brazilian Women's Chess Champion (1975, 1986).

== Biography ==
From the mid-1970s until the end of the 1980s, Maria Cristina de Oliveira was one of the leading Brazilian chess players. She participated in many Brazilian Women's Chess Championships where she won two gold medals, 1975 and 1986. In 1976, Maria Cristina de Oliveira participated in the Women's World Chess Championship Interzonal Tournament in Rozendaal and ranked 12th place.

Maria Cristina de Oliveira played for Brazil in the Women's Chess Olympiad:

- In 1986, at first board in the 27th Chess Olympiad (women) in Dubai (+4, =4, -4).

In 1977, Maria Cristina de Oliveira was awarded the FIDE Woman International Master (WIM) title.
