= Giovanni Vescovi =

Brazilian chess grandmaster (born 1978)

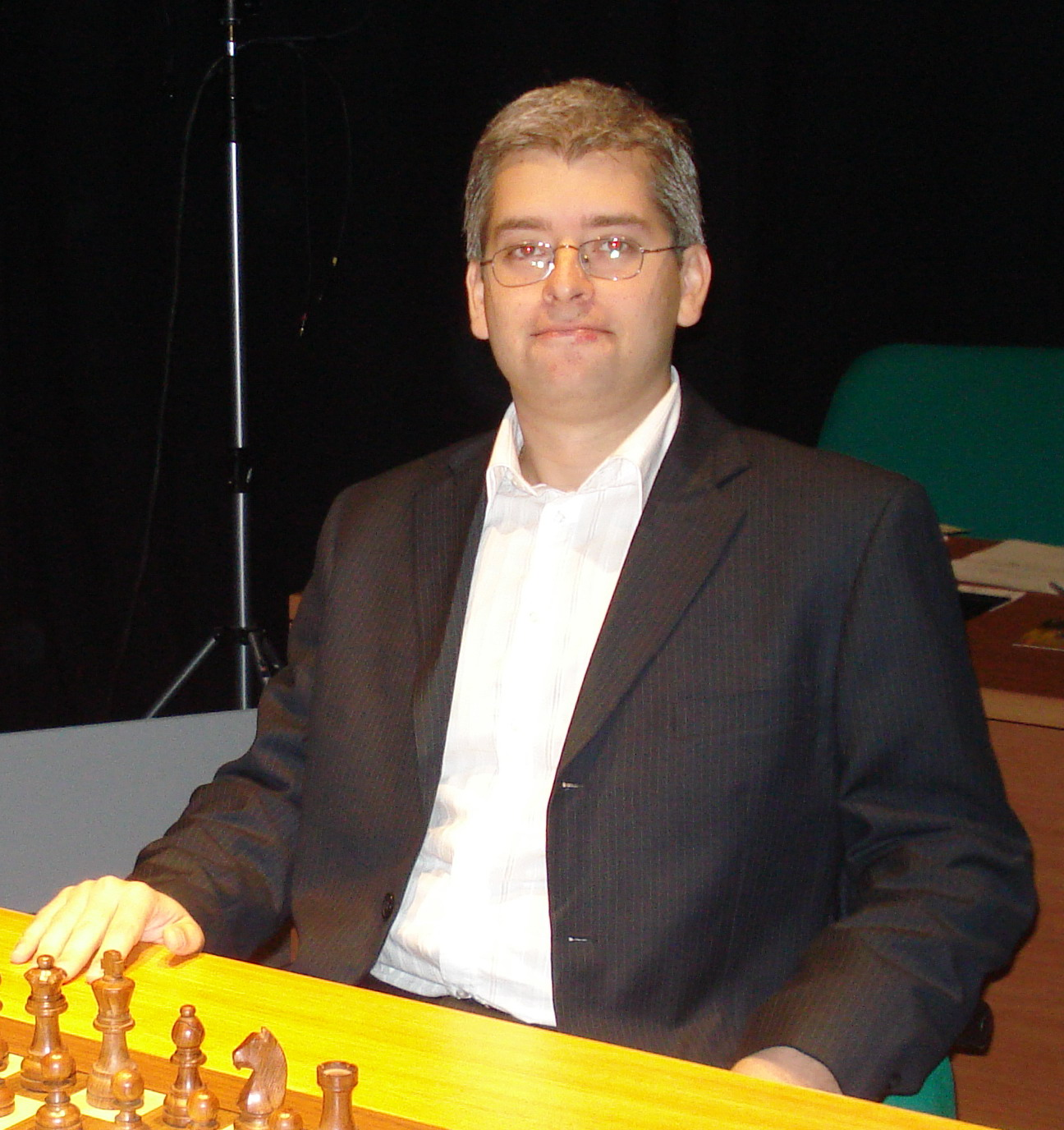
- Giovanni Vescovi, Linares 2008

Personal information
- Born: Giovanni Portilho Vescovi; 14 June 1978 (age 48) Porto Alegre, Brazil

Chess career
- Country: Brazil
- Title: Grandmaster (1998)
- FIDE rating: 2549 (July 2026)
- Peak rating: 2660 (January 2010)
- Peak ranking: No. 48 (April 2004)

Giovanni Portilho Vescovi (born 14 June 1978) is a Brazilian chess player. He was awarded the title of International Master in 1993 and the Grandmaster title in 1998. Vescovi is a seven-time national champion (1999, 2000, 2001, 2006, 2007, 2009 and 2010).

In 1998 he played on the first board in the first World Junior Team Chess Championship (for under 20) in Rio de Janeiro. He won the gold medal thanks to a score of 5½/6 points. He won the Bermuda tournament three times, in 2002, 2003 and 2004. He won the international tournament in São Paulo in 2005 and 2006.

In June 2001 Vescovi won the South American Chess Championship (FIDE 2.4 Zonal). This victory qualified him to play in the FIDE World Chess Championship, which started in November. Here he was knocked out in the second round by Veselin Topalov. In 2003, he tied with Alexander Goldin for first place in the American Continental Chess Championship in Buenos Aires, placing second on tiebreak. This result qualified him for the FIDE World Chess Championship 2004, where he was eliminated in the first round by Gadir Guseinov. In the Chess World Cup 2005 Vescovi was eliminated in the second round by Pentala Harikrishna.

== Sample game ==
Vescovi vs. Bezold, Bermuda 1997

Position: g8 black king, a7 black pawn, b7 black bishop, e7 black queen, h7 black pawn, a6 black knight, b6 black pawn, d5 black pawn, g5 black pawn, h5 white knight, c4 black rook, d4 white pawn, e4 black pawn, g3 white pawn, a2 white pawn, b2 white queen, e2 white pawn, f2 white pawn, g2 white bishop, h2 white pawn, d1 white rook, g1 white king

Diagram 1 - position after 23... Rxc4
Vescovi vs. Bezold, Bermuda 1997

Position: d8 black rook, f8 black king, a7 black pawn, b7 black bishop, d7 white pawn, f7 black queen, h7 black pawn, a6 black knight, b6 black pawn, f6 white knight, g5 black pawn, e4 black pawn, g3 white pawn, a2 white pawn, b2 white queen, e2 white pawn, f2 white pawn, h2 white pawn, d1 white rook, g1 white king

Diagram 2 - position after 28... Kf8

Giovanni Vescovi (2490) vs Michael Bezold (2500), Mermaid Beach Club, Bermuda, 1997, round 6, Dutch defense (A81):

1. d4 d5 2. Nf3 e6 3. g3 f5 4. Bg2 Nf6 5. b3 c6 6. O-O b6 7. c4 Bb7 8. Qc2 Na6 9. Ba3 Bxa3 10. Nxa3 Qe7 11. Qb2 O-O 12. Rac1 Rac8 13. Nb1 Rfd8 14. Nbd2 c5 15. Rfd1 Rc7 16. cxd5 exd5 17. Ne5 Ne4 18. Nd3 Rdc8 19. Nf4 g5 20. Nxe4 fxe4 21. Nh5 c4 22. bxc4 Rxc4 23. Rxc4 Rxc4 (Diagram 1) 24. Bxe4 dxe4 25. d5 Rc8 26. d6 Qf7 27. d7 Rd8 28. Nf6+ Kf8 (Diagram 2) 29. Nxh7+ Kg8 (29... Qxh7 30. Qf6+ Qf7 31. Qxd8+) 30. Nf6+ Kf8 31. Qe5 Nc5 32. Nh7+ Kg8 33. Qxg5+ Kxh7 34. Qxd8 Nd3 1-0
