= Darcy Lima =

Brazilian chess grandmaster (born 1962)

Personal information
- Born: Darcy Gustavo Machado Vieira Lima; 22 May 1962 (age 64) Rio de Janeiro, Brazil

Chess career
- Country: Brazil
- Title: Grandmaster (1997)
- Peak rating: 2550 (April 2001)

Darcy Gustavo Machado Vieira Lima (born 22 May 1962) is a Brazilian chess player. FIDE awarded him the International Master title in 1989 and the Grandmaster title in 1997. Also a chess official, Lima was granted the titles of FIDE Trainer in 2010 and FIDE International Organizer in 2013. He was the president of the Brazilian Chess Confederation from 1999 - 2004 and then from 2013 - 2020.

== Chess career ==
In 1980 Lima won the Brazilian junior championship in Fortaleza. He won the Brazilian Chess Championship three times (1992, 2002, 2003).

Lima won the South American zonal tournament at São Paulo twice, in 2000 and 2003. Thanks to these victories, he qualified to play in the FIDE World Chess Championship 2000 and the FIDE World Chess Championship 2004, respectively. Lima also competed in the FIDE World Cup in Khanty-Mansiysk in 2005, 2007 and 2011. Also in 2007, he tied for 1st-5th places in the American Continental Championship at Cali, Colombia.

Lima represented Brazil eleven times in the Chess Olympiad (1988–2008).
