= Vanessa Feliciano =

Brazilian chess player (born 1990)

Personal information
- Born: Vanessa Feliciano Ebert; 1 June 1990 (age 36) Rio do Sul, Santa Catarina, Brazil

Chess career
- Country: Brazil
- Title: Woman International Master (2013)
- FIDE rating: 2188 (March 2018)
- Peak rating: 2290 (November 2014)

Vanessa Feliciano Ebert (born 1 June 1990 in Rio do Sul) is a Brazilian chess player.

Vanessa made her debut in official chess tournaments in 1998, at the age of eight, winning the Women's Under-10 Catarinense Championship and a few days later she won the title of Brazilian Vice Champion in the same age group. And she never stopped winning, having accumulated 12 state titles and 5 national titles in the various base categories, the most significant being his victories in the Santa Catarina Absolute Youth Championship, Blumenau, 2006 and in the Brazilian Youth Championship, held in Taubaté, in the same year. In the main category of female chess from Santa Catarina, the title of State Champion of 2001 stands out, when she was only 11 years old.

She represented Brazil in several South American, Pan American and World Championships and also at the Chess Olympiad in Dresden, 2008, where she played second board of the national women's team, and in Istanbul 2012, where she played first board.

She participated in nine Brazilian Women's Chess Championships, winning twice in a row (2009/2010).

Vanessa Feliciano earned the title of Woman International Master (WIM) in 2013.

== See also ==
- List of female chess players
