= Gunderam Defense =

Position: a8 black rook, b8 black knight, c8 black bishop, e8 black king, f8 black bishop, g8 black knight, h8 black rook, a7 black pawn, b7 black pawn, c7 black pawn, d7 black pawn, e7 black queen, f7 black pawn, g7 black pawn, h7 black pawn, e5 black pawn, e4 white pawn, f3 white knight, a2 white pawn, b2 white pawn, c2 white pawn, d2 white pawn, f2 white pawn, g2 white pawn, h2 white pawn, a1 white rook, b1 white knight, c1 white bishop, d1 white queen, e1 white king, f1 white bishop, h1 white rook
- Moves: 1.e4 e5 2.Nf3 Qe7
- ECO: C40
- Origin: 1958
- Named after: Gerhart Gunderam
- Parent: King's Knight Opening

The Gunderam Defense, also known as the Brazilian Defense or the Câmara Defense if followed by moves ...g6, ...Bg7 and ...Nf6, creating the typical King's Indian formation, is a rarely played chess opening starting with the moves:

1. e4 e5
2. Nf3 Qe7

It is named after chess player and theoretician Gerhart Gunderam, though Hélder Câmara played it 4 years prior to Gunderam.

== History ==
The opening was first played by International Master Hélder Câmara in 1954, in the IV Centennial of the City of São Paulo Tournament and the XXII Brazilian Chess Championship.

Gunderam played it for the first time in a correspondence match against August Babel in 1958 and published an analysis of it in his book Neue Eröffnungswege, in 1961. He named this defense "Damenverteidigung" ("Queen Defence"), whose main line would be 1. e4 e5 2.Nf3 Qe7 3.Nc3 c6 4.Bc4 f5. He also analyzed a sharp line characterized by the moves: 1.e4 e5 2.Nf3 Qe7 3.Bc4 f5 4.exf5 d5 5.Bxd5 Nf6 6.Bb3 Bxf5.

In 1969, Washington de Oliveira published a work dedicated to the analysis of Câmara's use of the opening, called Notas Sobre a Defesa Brasileira ("Annotations on the Brazilian Defense").

== Overview ==
Although 2...Qe7 does answer the threat against Black's e-pawn, it interferes with the development of Black's dark-square bishop. One of the ideas behind this awkward queen move is to unbalance the game by castling queenside while White will presumably castle kingside.

Whereas Gunderam's suggestion was the f7-f5 break, as a delayed Latvian Gambit, Câmara's intent was to allow the use of the King's Indian setup against King's Pawn opening, proceeding with ...g6, ...Bg7 and ...Nf6 after 2...Qe7. It became popular among Brazilian players then, so much so they began calling it "the Brazilian defense", being employed often in the top national competition the following years. Later on, Hélder Câmara requested that it be called "Camara Defense" instead.

== Notable games ==
August Babel vs Gerhart Gunderam, Germany (corr), 1958

1. e4 e5 2. Nf3 Qe7 3. Nc3 c6 4. Bc4 f5 5. d3 Nf6 6. Ng5 h6 7. Nf3 g5 8. Qe2 Bg7 9. Bd2 d6 10. 0-0-0 Na6 11. Rhe1 b5 12. Nxb5 cxb5 13. Bxb5+ Kf8 14. exf5 Qb7 15. Bc4 Rb8 16. Bc3 Nc5 17. d4 Nce4 18. dxe5 Nxc3 19. bxc3 Qxb2+ 20. Kd2 Bxf5 21. Bd3 Nd5 22. Bxf5 Qxc3+ 23. Kc1 Nb4 24. Be6 d5 25. Bxd5 Qa3+ 26. Kd2 Rd8 27. Qe4 Nxd5 28. Qf5+ Ke7 0-1

== See also ==
- List of chess openings
- List of chess openings named after people
