= Jussara Chaves =

Brazilian chess player (born 1959)

Personal information
- Born: Jussara Chaves Garcez Leme; 9 December 1959 (age 66) São Paulo, Brazil

Chess career
- Country: Brazil (until 2021); Portugal (since 2021)
- Title: Woman International Master (1982)
- Peak rating: 2115 (January 1989)

Jussara Chaves (born 9 December 1959) is a Brazilian chess player who holds the FIDE title of Woman International Master (WIM, 1982). She is a four time Brazilian Women's Chess Champion (1976, 1981, 1982, 1989). She has represented Portugal since 2021.

== Biography ==
She is the older sister of Joara Chaves. From the mid-1970s until the end of the 1990s, Jussara was one of the leading Brazilian chess players. She has participated in numerous Brazilian Women's Chess Championships and won four gold (1976, 1981, 1982, 1989) and five silver (1978, 1980, 1987, 1995, 1998) medals.

Jussara Chaves played for Brazil in the Women's Chess Olympiads:

- In 1980, at second board in the 9th Chess Olympiad (women) in Valletta (+4, =4, -4),
- In 1982, at first board in the 10th Chess Olympiad (women) in Lucerne (+5, =5, -2),
- In 1984, at third board in the 26th Chess Olympiad (women) in Thessaloniki (+9, =0, -1) and won individual gold medal,
- In 1986, at third board in the 27th Chess Olympiad (women) in Dubai (+6, =3, -3),
- In 1988, at first board in the 28th Chess Olympiad (women) in Thessaloniki (+7, =1, -4),
- In 1990, at first board in the 29th Chess Olympiad (women) in Novi Sad (+3, =4, -4),
- In 1992, at first reserve board in the 30th Chess Olympiad (women) in Manila (+6, =2, -4),
- In 1994, at third reserve board in the 31st Chess Olympiad (women) in Moscow (+4, =4, -4).

In 1982, Chaves was awarded the FIDE Woman International Master (WIM) title. She is also a FIDE International Arbiter (1990).
