= José Thiago Mangini =

Brazilian chess player

Jose Thiago Mangini
Personal information
- Born: 4 January 1920 Rio de Janeiro, Brazil
- Died: 10 February 1984 (aged 64)

Chess career
- Country: Brazil

Jose Thiago Mangini (4 January 1920 – 10 February 1984) was a Brazilian chess player. He was twice Brazilian Chess Champion, in 1950 and 1956.

== Biography ==
In the 1950s, Mangini was one of the leading Brazilian chess players. He participated in many Brazilian Chess Championships where he won two gold (1950, 1956) and a silver (1951) medals. In 1951 and 1957, he represented Brazil in the World Chess Championship South America Zonal tournaments. Mangini participated in several major international chess tournaments which took place in Brazil.

Mangini played for Brazil in the Chess Olympiad:

- In 1952, at third board in the 10th Chess Olympiad in Helsinki (+5, =1, -3).
