= Boris Schnaiderman =

Brazilian translator

- Born: Борис Соломонович Шнайдерман; 17 May 1917; Uman, Russian Empire (today Ukraine)
- Died: 18 May 2016 (aged 99); São Paulo, Brazil
- Occupations: Translator, writer, essayist
- Known for: Pioneering translator of classical Russian books into Portuguese
- Spouse: Jerusa Pires Ferreira
- Awards: Academia Brasileira de Letras; Recipients of Russian civil awards and decorations

Boris Solomonovitch Schnaiderman (Russian Борис Соломонович Шнайдерман; 17 May 1917 – 18 May 2016) was a Russian-born Brazilian translator, writer, professor, and essayist.

Born in Uman, Schnaiderman settled in Odesa at a very young age, living there until age eight, when he moved to Brazil. In 1960, he became the first professor of Russian literature at the University of São Paulo, despite holding a degree in agronomy. He rendered into Portuguese works by prominent Russian writers and poets, such as Dostoevsky, Tolstoy, Chekhov, Gorky, Babel, Pasternak, Pushkin, and Mayakovsky.

Before leaving the Soviet Union, he witnessed the filming of the Odesa Steps sequence in Sergey Eisenstein's film The Battleship Potemkin. Schnaiderman only later realised what he had seen when watching the film on screen.

He became a naturalized Brazilian in 1941, and later fought in World War II in the Brazilian Expeditionary Force, an experience that inspired the novel Guerra em Surdina ("Muted War"). Due to Schnaiderman's opposition to the military dictatorship, he was arrested while giving a lecture.

In 2003, he was bestowed the Prize of Translation by the Brazilian Academy of Letters. He was a pioneer in translating classical Russian books directly from the Russian language; prior to his effort, indirect translations were the standard. In 2007 he also received the Medal of Pushkin from the Russian government.

Schnaiderman said of Dostoevsky that he was "...the kind of writer who drags us; while we have to agree with him, we have to turn against him. I mean, sometimes I translate something that contradicts my deepest convictions. Dostoevsky was a great writer, he had that understanding, that extraordinary humanity, while he was racist, chauvinistic, sexist."
