= Ruth Cardoso (chess player) =

Brazilian chess player

- Born: Ruth Volkl; 9 February 1934; Belmonte, Brazil
- Died: 11 February 2000 (aged 66)
- Occupation: Chess player
- Title: Woman International Master

Ruth Cardoso (born Ruth Volkl; February 9, 1934 – February 11, 2000) was a Brazilian chess player born in Belmonte. She was awarded the title Woman International Master by the International Chess Federation in 1970. In 1971, she participated in Women's Chess Interzonal Tournament.
