= Hélder Câmara (chess player) =

Brazilian chess player (1937–2016)

Personal information
- Born: 7 February 1937 Fortaleza, Brazil
- Died: 20 February 2016 (aged 79) São Paulo, Brazil

Chess career
- Country: Brazil
- Title: International Master (1972)
- Peak rating: 2405 (July 1972)

Hélder Câmara (7 February 1937 – 20 February 2016) was a Brazilian chess International Master (IM) (1972), two times Brazilian Chess Championship winner (1963, 1968).

== Biography ==
From the mid-1960s to mid-1980s, Hélder Câmara was one of Brazil's leading chess players. He won eight medals in Brazilian Chess Championships: 2 gold (1963, 1968), 3 silver (1961, 1964, 1966) and 3 bronze (1967, 1970, 1985). Hélder Câmara five times participated in World Chess Championships South American Zonal tournaments (1963, 1966, 1969, 1972, 1975). His best result in this tournament was shared 4th–6th place in 1972.

Hélder Câmara played for Brazil in the Chess Olympiads:

- In 1968, at third board in the 18th Chess Olympiad in Lugano (+7, =2, -7),
- In 1970, at first board in the 19th Chess Olympiad in Siegen (+6, =7, -6),
- In 1974, at second board in the 21st Chess Olympiad in Nice (+5, =11, -5),
- In 1980, at first reserve board in the 24th Chess Olympiad in La Valletta (+2, =2, -2),
- In 1984, at first reserve board in the 26th Chess Olympiad in Thessaloniki (+1, =5, -1).

Hélder Câmara played for Brazil in the Pan American Team Chess Championships:

- In 1971, at fourth board in the 1st Panamerican Team Chess Championship in Tucuman (+2, =4, -0) and won team and individual bronze medals.

In 1972, Hélder Câmara was awarded the FIDE International Master (IM) title.

Hélder Câmara was younger brother of Brazilian chess master Ronald Câmara and nephew of Brazilian Catholic archbishop Hélder Câmara.

== See also ==
- Brazilian Defense
