= Juliana Sayumi Terao =

Brazilian chess player (born 1991)

Juliana Terao
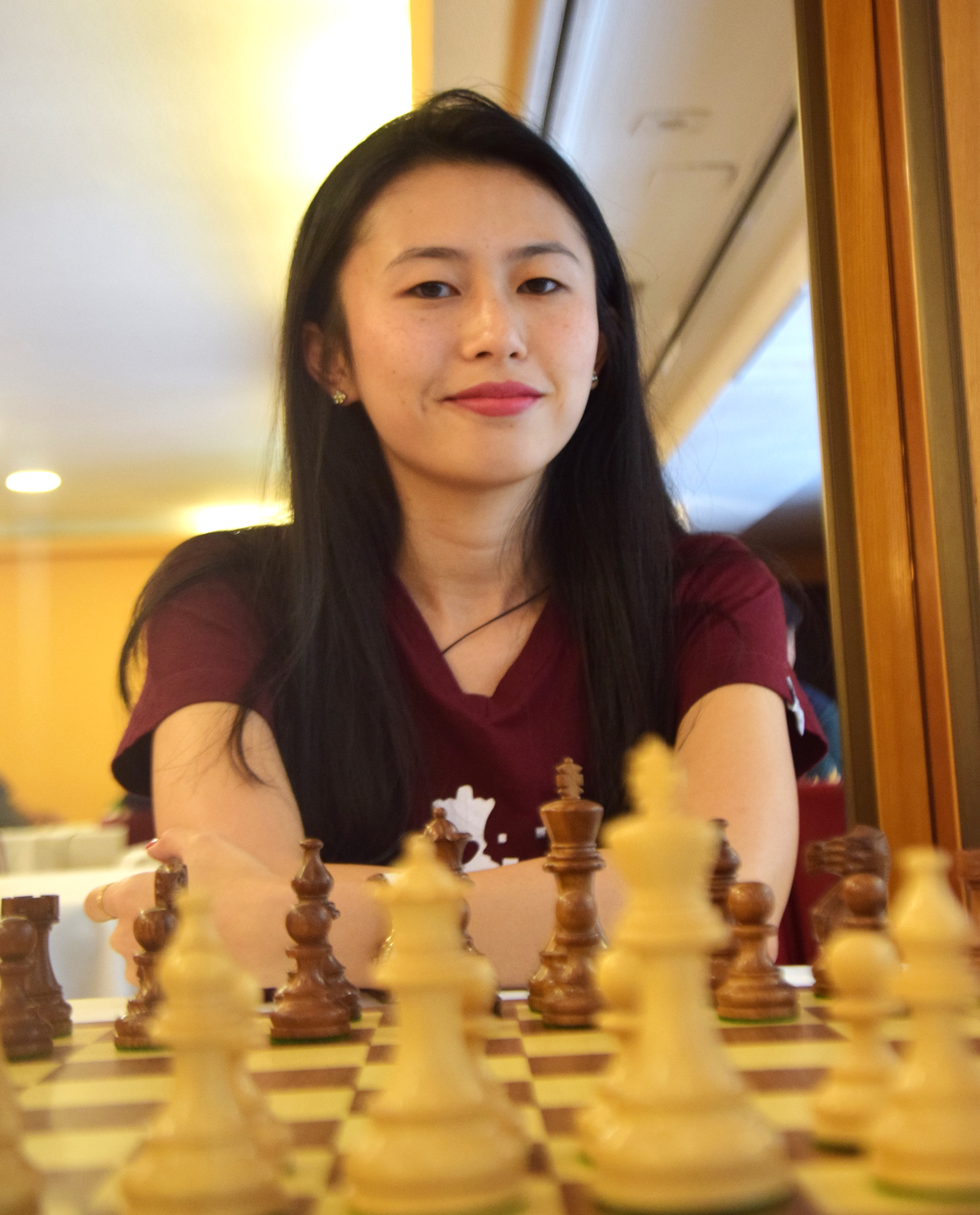
- Terao at the 2018 Andorra open

Personal information
- Born: July 12, 1991 (age 35)

Chess career
- Country: Brazil
- Title: FIDE Master (2017); Woman International Master (2012)
- Peak rating: 2311 (March 2017)

Juliana Sayumi Terao (born 1991) is a Brazilian chess player. She received the FIDE titles of FIDE Master (FM) in 2017 and Woman International Master (WIM) in 2012. From 2014 until 2020 she was ranked as the best female chess player in Brazil. Her highest rating was 2311, achieved in March 2017.

She is six times Brazilian women's champion, a title she won in five consecutive years from 2015 to 2019.

== Chess career ==
She has represented Brazil in the Chess Olympiad:

- In 2008, scoring 6/10 on board one.
- In 2010, scoring 5/11 on board one.
- In 2012, scoring 6½/10 on board two.
- In 2014, scoring 6/10 on board two.
- In 2016, scoring 7/11 on board one.
- In 2018, scoring 6/11 on board one.
- In 2022, scoring 7½/10 on board three.
- In 2024, scoring 5½/8 on board one.
- In 2026, scoring 7½/10 on board two.

== See also ==
- List of female chess players
