= Antônio Cavilhas Rocha =

Brazilian chess player (born 1944)

Personal information
- Born: 13 June 1944 (age 82) Rio Grande, Brazil

Chess career
- Country: Brazil
- Title: International Master (1979)
- Peak rating: 2385 (January 1978)

Antônio Cavilhas Rocha (born 13 June 1944) is a Brazilian chess International Master (IM) (1979), two times Brazilian Chess Championship winner (1964, 1969).

== Biography ==
From the begin of 1960s to begin of 1980s, Antônio Cavilhas Rocha was one of Brazil's leading chess players. He won two gold (1964, 1969) and silver (1963) medal in Brazilian Chess Championships. Antônio Cavilhas Rocha three times participated in World Chess Championships South American Zonal tournaments (1963, 1966, 1969). His best result in this tournaments was 7th place in 1963.

Antônio Cavilhas Rocha played for Brazil in the Chess Olympiads:

- In 1960, at first reserve board in the 14th Chess Olympiad in Leipzig (+2, =2, -3),
- In 1964, at third board in the 16th Chess Olympiad in Tel Aviv (+3, =4, -6),
- In 1966, at second board in the 17th Chess Olympiad in Havana (+0, =2, -5),
- In 1968, at fourth board in the 18th Chess Olympiad in Lugano (+5, =7, -3),
- In 1970, at second board in the 19th Chess Olympiad in Siegen (+8, =7, -3),
- In 1984, at second reserve board in the 26th Chess Olympiad in Thessaloniki (+1, =5, -1).

Antônio Cavilhas Rocha played for Brazil in the South American Team Chess Championship:

- In 1989, at fourth board in the 1st South American Team Chess Championship in Mar del Plata (+0, =0, -1) and won team silver medal.

There was no reliable information about the life of Antônio Cavilhas Rocha after 1995.
