= Timbó =

Coordinates: 26°49′22″S 49°16′19″W

- Municipality
- Municipality of Timbó
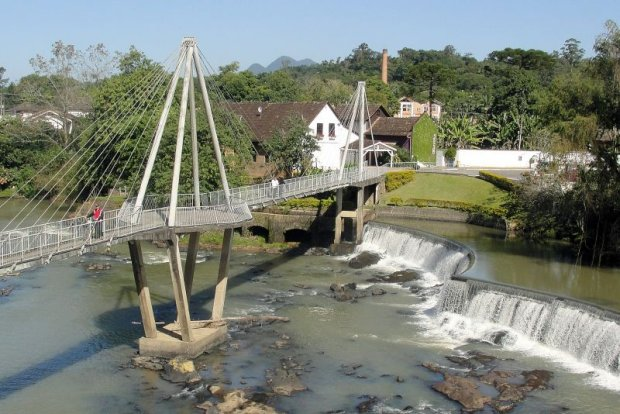
- Figueira Square in Timbó

- Flag Coat of arms
- Nickname: Pérola do Vale ("Valley's Pearl")
- Location in Santa Catarina
- Country: Brazil
- Region: South
- State: Santa Catarina
- Mesoregion: Vale do Itajaí

Government
  - Mayor: Jorge Augusto Krüger (PP)

Area
  - Total: 128.313 km^{2} (49.542 sq mi)

Population (2020)
  - Total: 44,977
  - Density: 350.53/km^{2} (907.86/sq mi)
- Time zone: UTC -3
- Postal code: 89120
- HDI (2010): 0.784 – high
- Website: timbo.sc.gov.br

Timbó is a municipality in the state of Santa Catarina, in the South region of Brazil. It is located at 26º49'24" south latitude and 49º16'18" west longitude, at an altitude of 68 meters. As of 2022, its population was 46,099 inhabitants. It covers an area of 130.31 km ².

== History ==
German immigrants, led by Frederico Donner, settled at the confluence of the Benedito and Cedros rivers, which originated from the Colony of Blumenau. Italian immigrants also arrived later, and today, each of these two ethnic groups accounts for almost 50% of the population. Most immigrants who arrived in Timbó came from Germany (Pomerania and Hamburg) and from Italy (Chiavenna and Trent). Timbó was founded on October 12, 1869, and was elevated to a municipality on March 25, 1934.

== Tourist sights ==
Azul Hill, original Morro Azul ("Freymund Germer Ecological Park")

Located 18 km from the city center, it is the highest point in Timbó, with an altitude of 758 meters. The summit is equipped with a ramp for gliding, a structure for camping and offers a wonderful view. On the way, among winding streets, there are many traditional old houses with beautiful landscapes.

Botanical Garden ("Franz Damm Exhibition Park")

Located in the city center. It has a large green area with lakes, structure for camping, barbecue grills, restaurant and ecological trails.

Morro Arapongas

Viewpoint of the city, 6 kilometers from downtown; most frequented by people who likes adventure and sports, mainly to practice free flight (gliding).

Benedito River Dam

Built in 1880 by German immigrants, is in the center of Timbó. Access is by Oscar Bremer Square, with its century-old fig tree. Approaching it, the environment is calmer, despite being inserted in the urban context.

Museum of the Music - Hall Hammermeister

Musical instruments of five centuries exposed in a ballroom built in the early 20th century. Inaugurated on 19 September 2004, houses a collection of over a thousand pieces, including musical instruments, sheet music, technical drawings, books and accessories. Located on Edmundo Bell Street, Highway SC477, km 5th.

Museum of the Immigrant

The Museum of the Immigrant is located at the Avenue Getúlio Vargas - Downtown.

House of the Poet Lindolf Bell

The House of the Poet Lindolf Bell was inaugurated on December 11, 2003, and aims to present the Museum - which aims to preserve and keep alive the shape, style and the roots of Bell's life - core memory - which is composed of documents and photographs - library - containing books of poetry, poems and short stories whose authorship of Santa Catarina and authors from other parts of Brazil - Square - Art of Grace - The square can be visited any time of day and night. Located between the streets and Quintino Bocaiuva and Botuverá.

== See also ==
- List of municipalities in Santa Catarina
