= Gilberto Milos =

Brazilian chess grandmaster (born 1963)

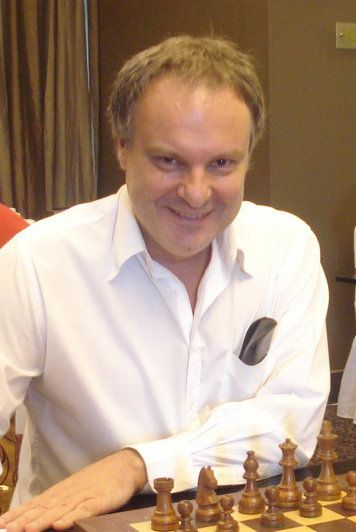

Personal information
- Born: October 30, 1963 (age 62) São Paulo, Brazil

Chess career
- Country: Brazil
- Title: Grandmaster (1988)
- FIDE rating: 2575 (July 2026)
- Peak rating: 2644 (October 2000)
- Peak ranking: No. 38 (October 2000)

Gilberto Milos (born October 30, 1963) is a Brazilian chess player. He was awarded by FIDE the title of International Master in 1984 and the title of Grandmaster in 1988. Milos competed in the FIDE World Championship five times (1998, 1999, 2000, 2002, 2004) and in the FIDE World Cup three times (2005, 2007, 2009)

== Career ==
Milos won the Brazilian Chess Championship in 1984, 1985, 1986, 1989, 1994 and 1995. His most notable chess tournament accomplishments are first prize in the 1987, 1998, 2005, and 2007 South American Chess Championships in Santiago, and first at Buenos Aires 1988. In 2010 Milos won the 3rd Iberoamerican Chess Championship in Mexico City.

Milos was a member of the Brazilian national team in the Chess Olympiad 12 times between 1982 and 2014. He participated in several FIDE World Chess Championships, in 1998, 1999, 2000, 2002 and 2004, but was on each occasion knocked out in an early stage.

In the Chess World Cup 2000 Milos qualified for the semi-finals of the event.

== Notable games ==
- Milos faced GM Niaz Murshed in Groningen, 1997. The game played through the chess opening known as the Sicilian Defense.
  Milos vs. Niaz Murshed
  1.e4 c5 2.Nf3 e6 3.d4 cxd4 4.Nxd4 Nc6 5.Nc3 Qc7 6.Be2 a6 7.0-0 Nf6 8.Kh1 Bb4 9.Bg5 Bxc3 10.Bxf6 gxf6 11.bxc3 d6 12.Qd2 Bd7 13.Rad1 Ke7 14.f4 Rac8 15.Nb3 Rcd8 16.Qe1 Na5 17.Nd4 h5 18.Qh4 Nc6 19.Nf3 Rhg8 20.Nd2 Na5 21.e5 dxe5 22.Ne4 Rg6 23.Bxh5 Rh6 24.Nxf6 Rxf6 25.fxe5 Qxe5 26.Rde1 Qxc3 27.Rf3 Qxe1+ 28.Qxe1 Rxf3 29.Bxf3 Nc6 30.Qh4+ f6 31.Qh7+ Kd6 32.Qg7 f5 33.h4 1–0
- In this game, Milos faced GM Michael Adams as black. Despite having an inferior rating to Adams, Milos was able to pull off an upset. The game, played in Buenos Aires 1991 entered the Spanish Game:
  Michael Adams vs. Milos
  1.e4 e5 2.Nf3 Nc6 3.Bb5 a6 4.Ba4 Nf6 5.0-0 b5 6.Bb3 Bb7 7.d3 Be7 8.c4 0-0 9.Nc3 bxc4 10.Bxc4 d6 11.a3 Nd4 12.Be3 c5 13.Rb1 Bc8 14.b4 Bg4 15.Bxd4 cxd4 16.Nd5 Nxd5 17.Bxd5 Rb8 18.h3 Bd7 19.Nd2 Kh8 20.Qb3 Bg5 21.Nc4 Bf4 22.Qd1 Qh4 23.Qe2 Qh6 24.Rb2 f5 25.g3 Bc1 26.Rxc1 Qxc1+ 27.Kh2 f4 28.Rc2 fxg3+ 29.fxg3 Qh6 30.h4 Rf6 31.Qd2 Qh5 32.Qe2 Bg4 33.Qd2 h6 34.Na5 Rbf8 35.Nc6 Rf1 36.Ne7 Bd1 0–1
