= Krikor Mekhitarian =

Brazilian chess grandmaster (born 1986)

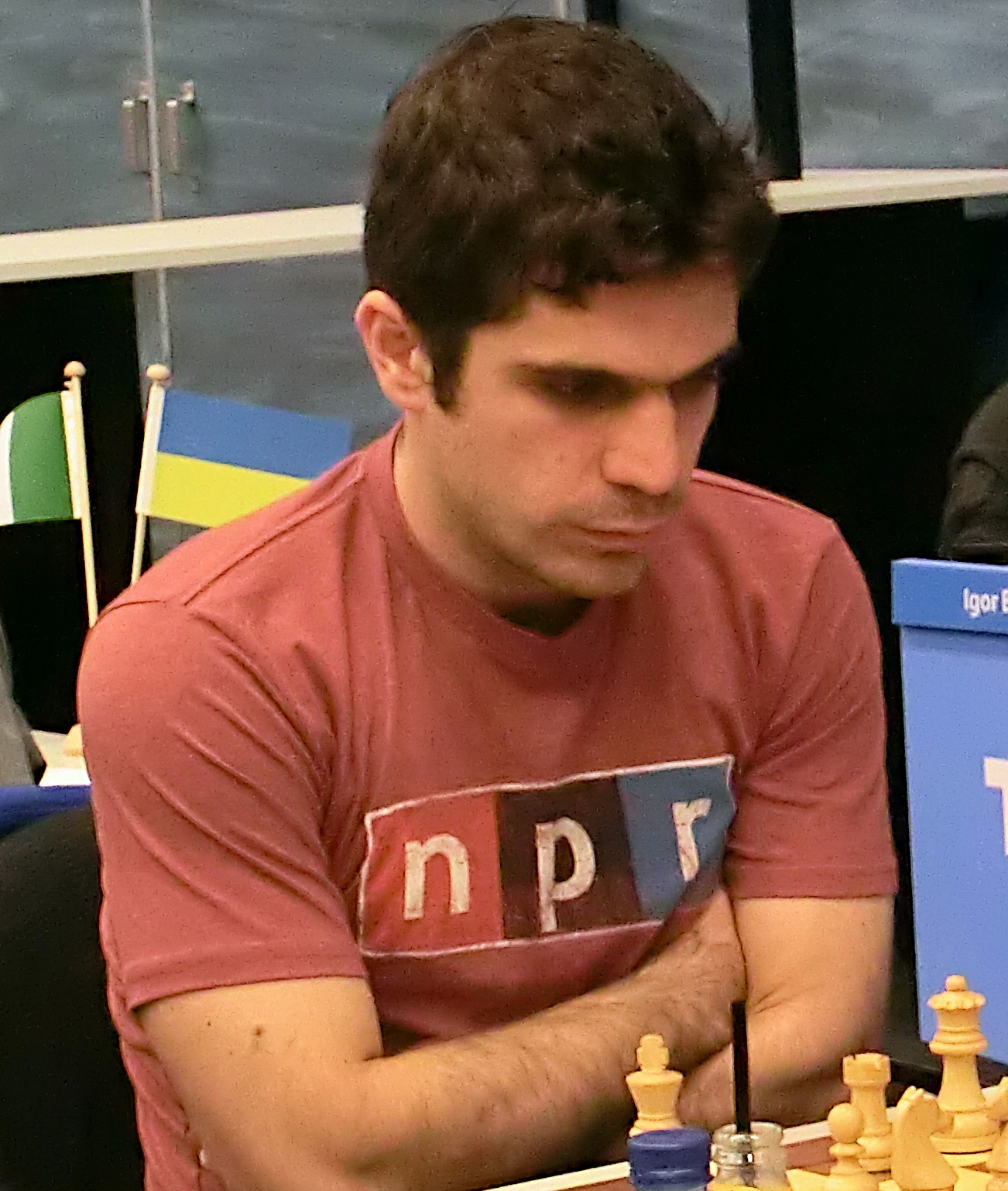
- Mekhitarian in 2013

Personal information
- Born: Krikor Sevag Mekhitarian; 15 November 1986 (age 39) São Paulo, Brazil

Chess career
- Country: Brazil
- Title: Grandmaster (2010)
- FIDE rating: 2544 (July 2026)
- Peak rating: 2589 (July 2015)

Krikor Sevag Mekhitarian (Armenian: Գրիգոր Սևակ Մխիթարեան; Arabic: كريكور سيفاغ مخيتاريان; born 15 November 1986) is a Brazilian chess grandmaster, streamer, and the current Director of Portuguese Content for Chess.com. He is a two-time Brazilian Chess Champion.

== Early life ==
Born to a Brazilian mother and a Lebanese father, both of Armenian descent, he learned to play chess aged seven.

== Career ==
Mekhitarian achieved his Grandmaster title within the space of eight months, securing his first norm at the 26th Brazilian Championships held in 2009, tying for third place with a score of 7.5/11. His second norm came with an eighth-place finish and a 6/9 score in the La Laguna tournament held in April 2010. His final GM norm came in June 2010, with a 9th-place finish in the International Chess Festival Eforie, held in Romania, where he scored 8/11.

He took part in the Tata Steel Chess Tournament C Group 2013, finishing in 4th place with 8/13.

=== Boycott of the 2016 Chess Olympiad ===
The 2016 Chess Olympiad was held in Baku, Azerbaijan. Armenia, which was involved in an armed conflict with the host country, boycotted the event, claiming that its delegation was at risk. Being of Armenian descent, Krikor Mekhitarian, then the Brazilian chess champion, decided not to participate in the event as a way of supporting the Armenian team and protesting against the violence against Armenians in Azerbaijan.

== Team chess results ==
He has represented Brazil at five Chess Olympiads as follows:

- 39th Chess Olympiad: in Khanty-Mansiysk, 2010 - board 4, 3.5/8 (+1 =5 -2)
- 40th Chess Olympiad: in Istanbul, 2012 - reserve, 3/6 (+1 =4 -1)
- 41st Chess Olympiad: in Tromsø, 2014 - board 3, 6.5/10 (+5 =3 -2)
- 43rd Chess Olympiad: in Batumi, 2018 - board 4, 5.5/8 (+4 =3 -1)
- 44th Chess Olympiad: in Chennai, 2022 - board 3, 7.5/11 (+7 =1 -3)
