= Rodrigo Flores =

Chilean chess player (1913–2007)

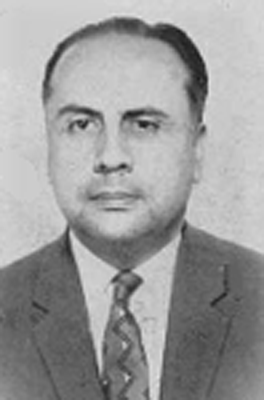
Rodrigo Flores Álvarez

Rodrigo Flores Álvarez (23 August 1913, in Santiago, Chile – 17 January 2007, in Santiago) was a Chilean engineer and chess master.

== Chess ==
Flores was Chilean Champion eleven times: 1931, 1935, 1938, 1941, 1944, 1950, 1951, 1952, 1956, 1961, and 1965.

He tied for 7-8th with Jacobo Bolbochán at Mar del Plata 1936 (Isaías Pleci won). In 1937, he won, ahead of René Letelier, in São Paulo (South American Chess Championship, Torneio Sulamericano). He took 8th in the Montevideo 1938 chess tournament (Alexander Alekhine won).

Rodrigo Flores played for Chile in three Chess Olympiads.

- In 1939, at second board in the 8th Chess Olympiad in Buenos Aires (+4 –5 =9); His victory over Moshe Czerniak was praised by both José Raúl Capablanca and Alexander Alekhine, as well as his opponent.
- In 1950, at second board in the 9th Chess Olympiad in Dubrovnik (+6 –3 =6);
- In 1956, at first board in the 12th Chess Olympiad in Moscow (+2 –6 =9).

In 1949, he tied for 6-9th in Mar del Plata (Héctor Rossetto won). In 1951, he took 4th in Mar del Plata / Buenos Aires (zt; Erich Eliskases and Julio Bolbochán won). In 1959, he tied for 7-8th in Santiago (Borislav Ivkov and Luděk Pachman won). In 1960, he tied for 3rd-5th in São Paulo (zt; Bolbochán won). In 1961, he took 2nd, behind Eugênio German, in São Paulo (zt; playoff). In 1962, he took 2nd in Mar del Plata (Raimundo García won).

== Engineering ==
Rodrigo Flores was a civil engineer. He entered the Chilean Academy of Sciences in 1970. In 1993, he won the national prize offered by Colegio de Ingenieros de Chile.
