= Herman Claudius van Riemsdijk =

Brazilian chess player (born 1948)

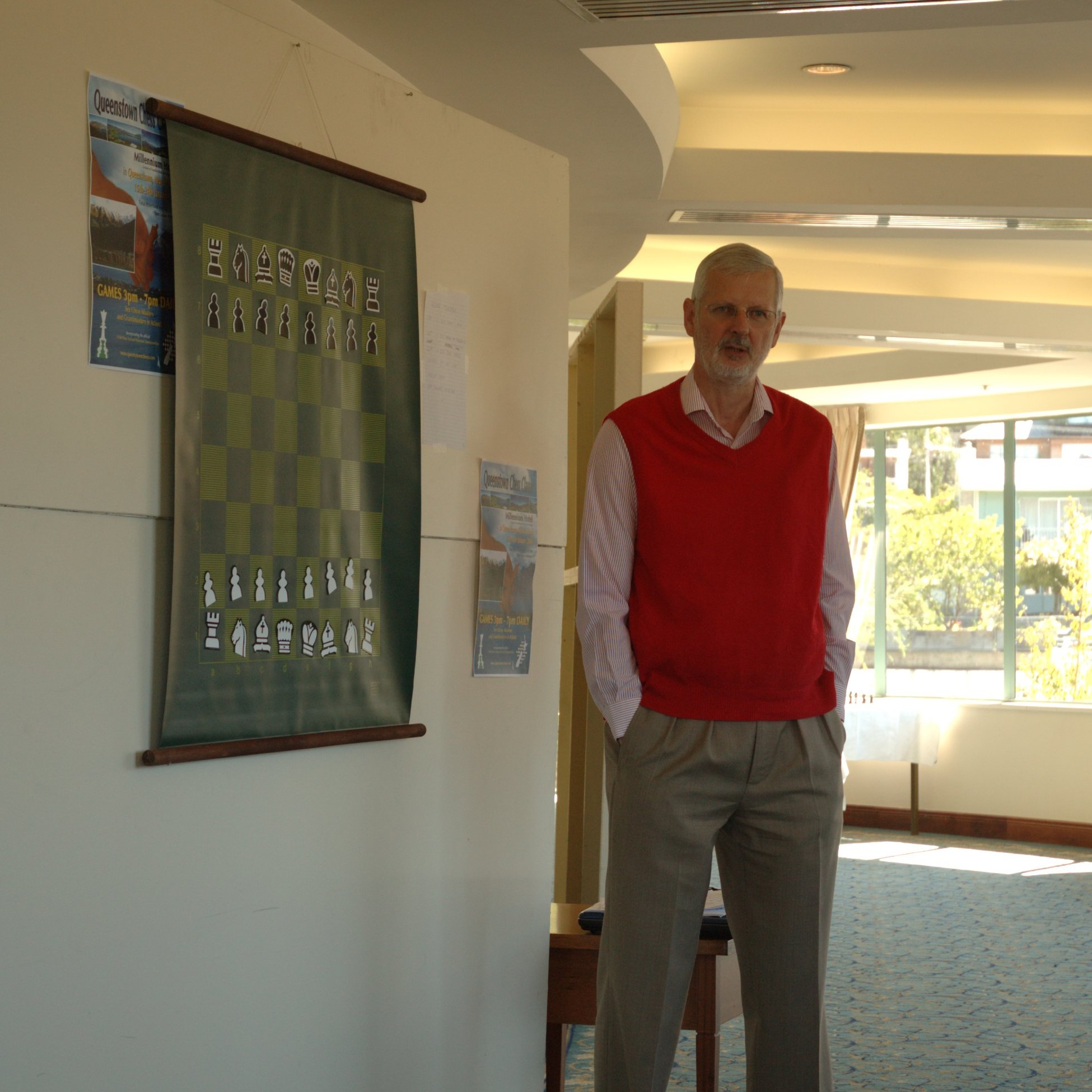
- Herman van Riemsdijk, Queenstown, New Zealand 2006

Personal information
- Born: 26 August 1948 (age 77) Tiel, Gelderland, Netherlands

Chess career
- Country: Brazil
- Title: International Master (1978)
- Peak rating: 2460 (July 1991)

Herman Claudius van Riemsdijk (born 26 August 1948) is a Brazilian chess player. He was awarded the title International Master by FIDE in 1978. Van Riemsdijk was also granted the title of International Arbiter in 1981.

Born in Tiel, the Netherlands, van Riemsdijk arrived in Brazil on 16 June 1958. He was Brazilian champion in 1970, 1973, and 1988, and Pan American champion in 1977. He played for Brazil in the Chess Olympiad eleven times (1972–1974, 1978–1984, 1988–1994, 1998) and in the Pan American Team Chess Championship three times (1971, 1985, 1991).

He has written articles for several chess publications, and with Belgian chess player Willem Diederik Hajenius he co-authored the book Final Countdown, a treatise on pawn endings. He has also been a second to Brazilian junior players, and has played as widely as New Zealand (where a brother lives) and Australia. His fluency in several languages helps.

In 2018 van Riemsdijk was awarded the title of FIDE Trainer and he was appointed captain/coach of the New Zealand women's team for the 43rd Chess Olympiad in Batumi, Georgia.

Herman van Riemsdijk's son Marius (b. 1976) is a FIDE International Arbiter.
