= Rafael Leitão =

Brazilian chess grandmaster (born 1979)

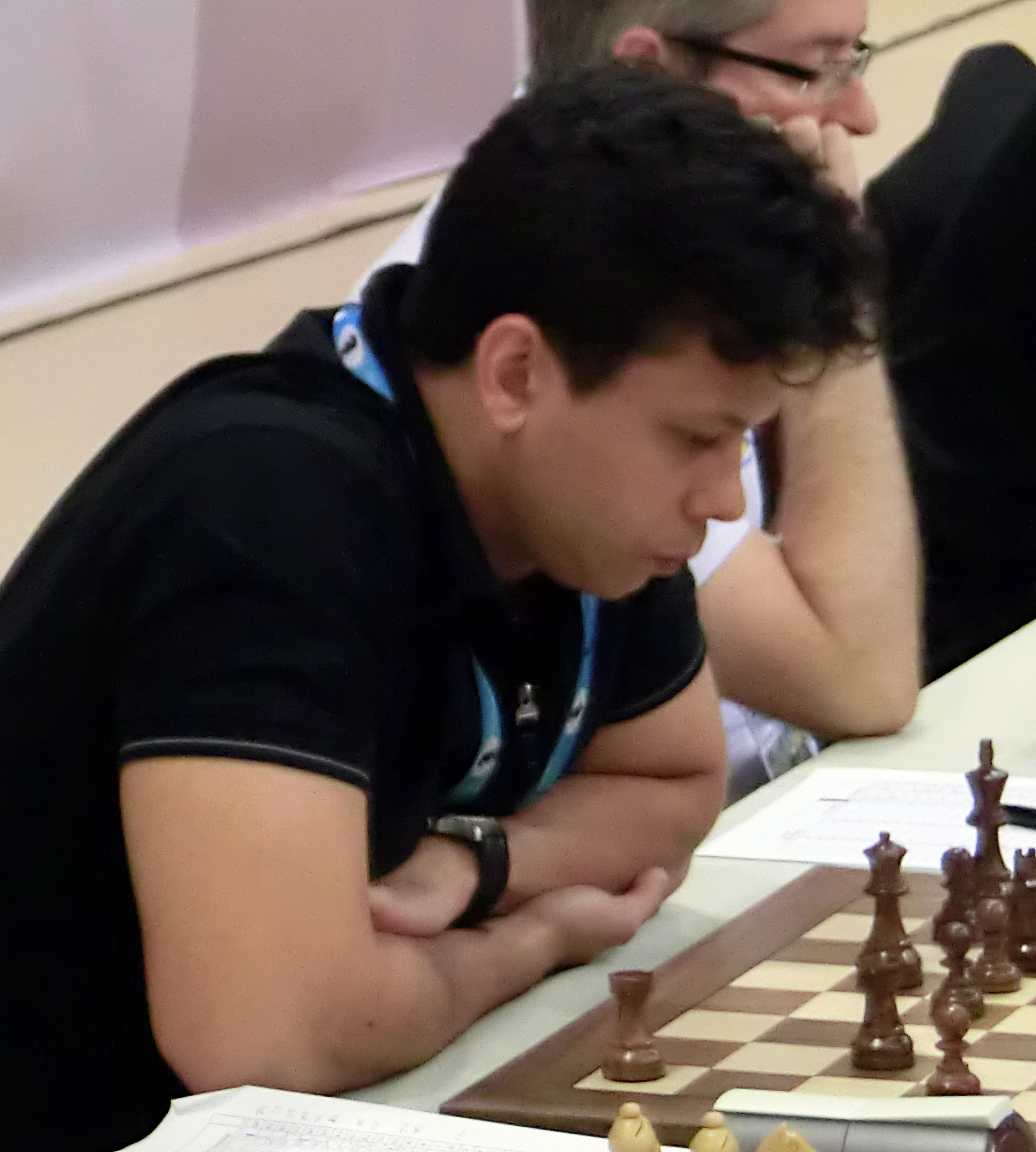
- Leitão in 2012

Personal information
- Born: Rafael Duailibe Leitão; 28 December 1979 (age 46) São Luís, Maranhão, Brazil

Chess career
- Country: Brazil
- Title: FIDE Grandmaster (1998); ICCF Grandmaster (2012)
- FIDE rating: 2575 (November 2026)
- Peak rating: 2652 (June 2014)
- Peak ranking: No. 100 (June 2014)
- ICCF rating: 2592 (April 2012)

Rafael Duailibe Leitão (born 28 December 1979) is a Brazilian chess grandmaster. He is a grandmaster in both over-the-board chess and correspondence chess. Leitão is a seven-time Brazilian champion. He competed in the FIDE World Championship in 1999, 2000 and 2004 and in the FIDE World Cup in 2005, 2007, 2009, 2013 and 2015.

== Chess career ==
Leitão won the World Youth Chess Championship in the U12 category in 1991 and in the U18 category in 1996. Leitão also won the Brazilian Chess Championship in 1996, 1997, 1998, 2004, 2011, 2013 and 2014. He played for Brazil in the Chess Olympiads of 1996, 2000, 2002, 2006, 2010, 2012, 2014, 2016 and 2018. He won the silver medal on board three at the 37th Chess Olympiad in 2006.

== Correspondence chess ==
Leitão started playing correspondence chess via the International Correspondence Chess Federation in 2009, becoming an ICCF International Master in 2011 and an ICCF Grandmaster in 2012. By finishing second in the third Candidate Tournament, Leitão qualified for the 26th Correspondence World Championship, eventually finishing third with a score of 9.5/16.
