= Brazilian Chess Confederation =

The Brazilian Chess Confederation (Portuguese: Confederação Brasileira de Xadrez) is the national governing body for chess in Brazil and a member of the International Chess Federation (usually referred to as FIDE).

The organization was founded on November 11, 1924 as the Federação Brasileira de Xadrez (Brazilian Chess Federation) and affiliated with FIDE in 1935. It is based in Santa Maria de Jetibá, Espírito Santo. Its president is Darcy Lima, who took office in 2013. It has 19 constituent clubs and 30,000 members.

Chess in Brazil is more popular in the South and Southeast than in the Northeast, and the confederation and its member associations have been affected by competition from online chess.

== Administration ==
Presidents	from	to
Gustavo Garnott	1927	1930
Antônio Américo Barbosa de Oliveira	1930	1935
Luiz Felipe Burlamaqui	1935	1938
Joaquim de Almeida Pinto	1938	1942
Olavo Coutinho Marques	1942	1943
Rui de Castro	1943	1947
Edmundo Gastão da Cunha	1948	1951
Roberto da Gama e Silva	1951	1953
Edmundo Gastão da Cunha	1953	1966
Márcio Elísio de Freitas	1966	1967
Luiz Tavares da Silva	1968	1970
Luiz Campelo Gentil	1970	1976
Washington de Oliveira	January 1976	June 1976
Erasmo Couto	1976 (interim)	
Célio Teodoro Assunção	1976	1978
Sérgio Farias	1978	1979
Márcio do Carmo Miranda	1980	1982
Sérgio Farias	1982	1986
Luiz Tavares da Silva	1986	1988
Jaime Sunye Neto	1988	1992
Antônio Bento de Araújo Lima	1992	1996
Estevão Antônio Reis Bakô	1997	1998
Darcy Lima	1999	2004
Sérgio da Silva Freitas	2005	2008
Pablyto Robert Baioco Ribeiro	2009	2012
Darcy Lima	2013	2020
Máximo Igor Miranda de Macedo	2021	

== See also ==
- Category:Brazilian chess players
