= Henrique Mecking =

Brazilian chess grandmaster (born 1952)

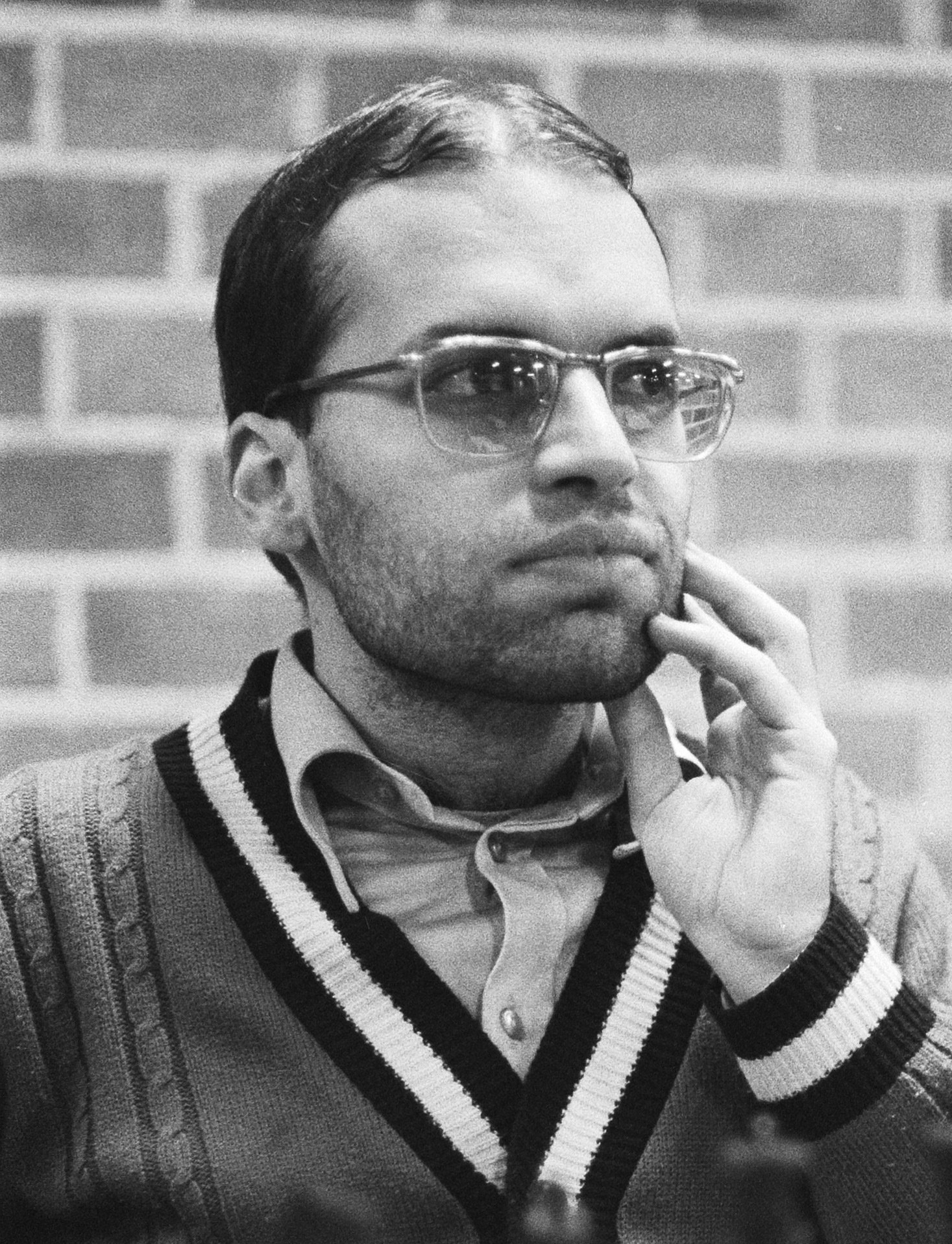
- Mecking in 1978

Personal information
- Born: Henrique Costa Mecking; 23 January 1952 (age 74) Santa Cruz do Sul, Brazil

Chess career
- Country: Brazil
- Title: Grandmaster (1972)
- FIDE rating: 2553 (July 2026)
- Peak rating: 2635 (January 1977)
- Peak ranking: No. 3 (January 1978)

Henrique Costa Mecking (born 23 January 1952), also known as Mequinho, is a Brazilian chess grandmaster, and was one of the leading players in the world in the 1970s. He was a chess prodigy, drawing comparisons to Bobby Fischer, although he did not achieve the International Grandmaster title until 1972. He won the Interzonals of Petropolis 1973 and Manila 1976. His highest FIDE rating is 2635, achieved in 1977, when he was ranked number four in the world. He became the third-ranked player in the world in 1978, behind only World Champion Anatoly Karpov and Viktor Korchnoi.

He is the first Brazilian to become a grandmaster. Despite winning his first national championship at the age of 13, he played in very few tournaments. He won at Vršac in 1971 and finished third with Robert Byrne (after the co-winners Karpov and Korchnoi) at Hastings in 1971–72. In 1975, he twice shared second place behind Ljubomir Ljubojević, firstly at Las Palmas with Ulf Andersson and Mikhail Tal, and then at Manila with Lev Polugaevsky, Bent Larsen and Helmut Pfleger.

He was considered a contender for the World Championship in the mid-1970s; however, his chess career was interrupted by a serious illness (myasthenia gravis).

Mecking played for Brazil in the Chess Olympiads of 1968, 1974, 2002 and 2004.

== World Championship candidate ==
Mecking was a regular participant in Candidates Tournaments, the FIDE events used to choose a challenger for the World Chess Championship. After unsuccessful attempts to qualify from the Interzonals of Sousse 1967 and Palma de Mallorca 1970, he had his first major triumph in 1973, when he won the Petrópolis Interzonal (ahead of a very strong field that included Paul Keres and David Bronstein). He was subsequently eliminated from the Candidates Tournament in the quarterfinals, after losing his match against Korchnoi. Still, from this time (in the aftermath of Bobby Fischer's effective retirement in 1972) until 1979, Mecking was the strongest player born in the West.

At his next attempt in 1976, he won the Manila Interzonal (ahead of Vlastimil Hort, Lev Polugaevsky, Vitaly Tseshkovsky, Ljubomir Ljubojević, Zoltán Ribli et al.), thereby reaching a second successive Candidates matches stage, but again lost in the quarterfinals, this time to Polugaevsky. Illness (myasthenia gravis) forced Mecking's withdrawal from the Interzonal at Rio de Janeiro in 1979 after a first round draw with Borislav Ivkov. His illness was so severe that it was widely believed he would soon die. He survived but did not play chess during the 1980s. While he was able to recover and to resume his chess career in 1991 with matches against Predrag Nikolić and (in 1992) Yasser Seirawan, followed by intermittent tournament appearances, his chance at the world title had passed and he has not been able to get even close to reaching the Candidates matches again.

== Personal life ==
Mecking is a convert to Catholicism, to which he credits the improvement of his medical condition. He is a member of the Catholic charismatic renewal.

== Notable games ==
- Mecking vs. Bobby Fischer, Buenos Aires (1970); Grünfeld Defense, ½–½.
- Mark Taimanov vs. Mecking, Palma de Mallorca Interzonal (1970); Nimzo-Indian Defense, 0–1.
- Mecking vs. Mikhail Tal, Las Palmas (1975); Najdorf Sicilian, 1–0.
- Vasily Smyslov vs. Mecking, Petrópolis Interzonal (1973); English Four Knights, 0–1.
- Mecking vs. Viktor Korchnoi, Sousse Interzonal (1967); King's Indian Defense, 1–0.
- Mecking vs. Aivars Gipslis, Sousse Interzonal (1967); Bogo-Indian Defense, 1–0. A game from Mecking's first Interzonal, played when he was 15 years old.
