= Oscar Panno =

Argentine chess grandmaster (born 1935)

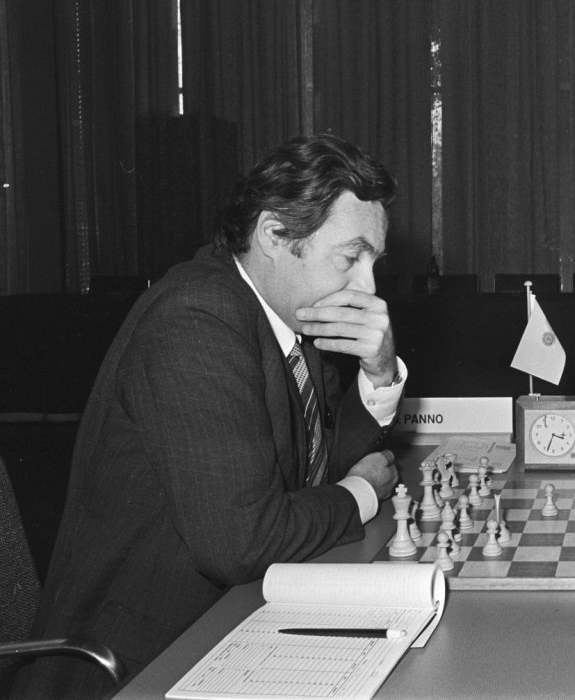
- Panno in 1977

Personal information
- Born: 17 March 1935 (age 91) Buenos Aires, Argentina

Chess career
- Country: Argentina
- Title: Grandmaster (1955)
- FIDE rating: 2438 (July 2026)
- Peak rating: 2585 (July 1973)
- Peak ranking: No. 18 (January 1978)

Oscar Roberto Panno (born 17 March 1935) is an Argentine chess Grandmaster, and a civil engineer.

== Biography ==
Panno was born in Buenos Aires. He won the 2nd World Junior Chess Championship in 1953, ahead of such future strong Grandmasters as Borislav Ivkov, Bent Larsen, and Fridrik Olafsson. He also won the championship of Argentina the same year. Oscar Panno became a grandmaster at the age of twenty.

Panno is a civil engineer by profession, and pursued his studies from 1958 to 1962, with less chess involvement during that period.

He competed in five interzonal tournaments, with his greatest success coming at Gothenburg 1955. In a field of 21 players, Panno finished clear third, only half a point out of second and ahead of such players as Efim Geller, Tigran Petrosian, and Boris Spassky. (He beat future World Champion Spassky in their individual game.) This result was probably the peak of his career, as it advanced him to the 1956 Candidates tournament in Amsterdam, the winner of which would play a 24-game match for the World Championship with Mikhail Botvinnik. However, his form from the interzonal did not carry over and he finished in a tie for 8th-9th in a ten-man field.

Chessmetrics.com, which attempts to rank players from before the introduction of FIDE ratings, estimates that he was as high as 18th in the world in his prime, in late 1955. He had an Elo rating of 2585 and was 19th in the world in his second prime (1973).

Panno has several successes at the tournaments at Mar del Plata. He won the international tournaments in 1954 and 1969 (shared with Miguel Najdorf), and the open tournaments in 1986, 1988, and 1994. He twice in a row won the strong Palma de Mallorca international invitational tournament: 1971 together with Ljubomir Ljubojević, 1972 at the best tie-break along with Viktor Korchnoi and Jan Smejkal. Panno tied for first at the prestigious Lone Pine 1977.

He played various famous grandmasters. In addition to his win over Boris Spassky in 1955, he also beat him at the 1976 Manila interzonal.

Panno played eleven times for Argentina in Chess Olympiads (1954–58, 1962, 1966–70, 1976, 1986–88, 1992). The 1954 Olympiad team won the silver medal, while the 1958 and 1962 teams won the bronze medal.

He was still active as of 2008, finishing third in the Bobby Fischer Memorial tournament held in Villa Martelli.
