= Mauro Mueller =

Filmmaker

- Born: Switzerland
- Occupation: Filmmaker
- Years active: 2009–present
- Notable work: A World for Raúl Copenhagen

Mauro Mueller is an independent Swiss-Mexican narrative filmmaker. He won in the Student Academy Awards in 2013 and is member of the Academy of Motion Pictures Arts and Sciences. He is best known for directing the short films Ge.hen'nah in 2010, A World for Raúl (Spanish: Un mundo para Raúl) in 2012, Fingerspiel in 2013, Dear Chickens starring Philip Baker Hall and Kerris Dorsey in 2018 and producing the feature film Copenhagen, the omnibus feature film A Quintet, and the Mexican feature In Times of Rain. He was the 2nd unit director on Awake and co-directed the 4th season of the Swiss mystery thriller Wilder and showran the Swiss sitcom "Our Little Embassy" for Swiss Television SRF, the first sitcom in more than 20 years. His feature film 1 111 Echoes from Halifax opened the 2026 Atlantic International Film Festival (AIFF) where it won the Gordon Parsons Award for Best Atlantic Feature. It had its international premerie at the Zurich Film Festival.

== Life and career ==
Mauro Mueller was born and raised in Switzerland. In 2008, he moved to New York City to study film directing and writing at Columbia University. Mueller graduated from the film program when he received his master's degree with honors in 2013.

While attending Columbia, he directed six award-winning short films: In for a surprise (2009), Ge.hen'nah (2010), Lee (2010), Santiago del otro lado (2011), A World for Raúl (2012) and Fingerspiel. The films won a number of film festival awards including the Student Academy Awards and the prestigious CINE Golden Eagle Award twice, a directing award that marked the early careers of Steven Spielberg, Mike Nichols, Robert Zemeckis and Ken Burns.

Mauro was also part of the Masterclass Atelier Paris-Ludwigsburg at La Femis in 2011, a post-graduate program which is tailored around European co-production/distribution.

In 2012 Mauro was selected as at the Talent Campus of Berlin Film Festival with his feature-length script Fingerplay, which was among 10 projects chosen to participate in the Script Station. In 2013, Mauro was chosen as part of the Guadalajara Talent Campus in Guadalajara Mexico.

The feature film Copenhagen won the Audience Award at Slamdance 2014 and the Grand Jury Prize at Florida Film Festival and Gasparilla International Film Festival in Tampa, Florida. It is a 2015 indie Netflix hit and sold to more than 90 countries.

Mauro attended the 2016 Rotterdam Producer's Lab and received the prestigious Young Creators grant from the National Fund for Culture and Arts in Mexico. He further was part of Trans Atlantic Partners, Cannes Producer's Network and IFP Marcie Bloom Fellowship.

In 2018, Mauro was invited to join the Academy of Motion Picture Arts and Sciences.

== Awards ==
In 2012, Mauro has been nominated as one of ten finalists in the New Asian Force category at the Hong Kong Independent Film & Video Awards for his short film Ge.hen'nah.

A World for Raúl (Spanish: Un mundo para Raúl) (2012), Mauro's thesis short film at Columbia University graduate film program, starring Alexandré Barceló, Adrián Alonso, Gerardo Taracena, Roberto Luis Meza, and Adriana Paz received numerous awards, including in the narrative category of the Student Academy Awards 2013, Best Student Short at Aspen Shortsfest, Best drama at New York Shortsfest, Upcoming Talent Awards at Solothurn Film Festival, among others.

The film received a review by Hammer to Nail, a film review site focused on Truly Independent Film.

- CINE Golden Eagle Award for Ge.hen’nah (2010) and A World for Raúl (2012).
- Golden Horseman Award at Filmfest Dresden for A World for Raúl (2012)
- Upcoming Talent Award at Solothurner Filmtage for A World for Raúl (2013)

== Fidelio Films ==
Mauro Mueller is co-owner of the production company Fidelio Films, a New York City-based independent film production company founded by producers David Figueroa García, Mark Raso, Mauro Mueller and Mauricio Leiva-Cock in 2010. All four of them met while studying at the MFA program in directing and screenwriting at Columbia University. The company has produced a number of acclaimed short films, winning twice in a row in the Student Academy Awards with Under in 2012 and Un mundo para Raúl in 2013. In 2014, for the third time in a row, they had a short Perfidia in the regional final of the Student Academy Awards. Their first feature film Copenhagen, featuring Gethin Anthony, Bodil Awards winner Frederikke Dahl Hansen, Sebastian Armesto, Mille Dinesen, Baard Owe, and Tamzin Merchant was theatrically released in North America in 2014. The company has offices in Los Angeles, Bogota, Mexico City and Zurich.

== Filmography ==
- In for a Surprise (2009, short film, director)
- Ge.hen'nah (2010, short film, director)
- Santiago del otro lado (2011, short film, director, writer, producer)
- Lee (2011, short film, director, writer)
- A World for Raúl (2012, short film, director, writer, co-producer)
- Fingerspiel (2014, short film, director, writer)
- Copenhagen (2014, feature film, producer)
- A Quintet (2014, feature film, producer, director of New York segment)
- In Times of Rain (2018, feature film, producer)
- Dear Chickens (2018, short film, director, writer, producer)
- Awake (2021, sci-fi film, 2nd unit director)
- Wilder (2022, mystery crime TV series, co-director)
- The Janitor (2025, drama, director)
- Our Little Embassy (2025, comedy sitcom, showrunner, developed by, executive producer)
- A Few Days in the Sun (2026, thriller, co-writer, director, executive producer)
- 111 Echoes from Halifax (2026, drama, co-writer, director, executive producer)
