= Chess at the 2023 Central American and Caribbean Games =

- Venue: Salon Hotel Terraza
- Location: (El Salvador) San Salvador
- Dates: 25 June – 29 June

The chess competition at the 2023 Central American and Caribbean Games was held in San Salvador, El Salvador from 25 June to 29 June at the Salon Hotel Terraza.

== Medal table ==
* Host nation (El Salvador)

Rank	Nation	Gold	Silver	Bronze	Total
1	Cuba (CUB)	3	4	0	7
2	Colombia (COL)	3	1	1	5
3	Mexico (MEX)	2	0	3	5
4	Puerto Rico (PUR)	0	1	3	4
5	Venezuela (VEN)	0	1	1	2
6	Trinidad and Tobago (TTO)	0	1	0	1
Totals (6 entries)		8	8	8	24

== Medal summary ==
=== Men's events ===
Board	Gold	Silver	Bronze
First Rapid Board	Carlos Daniel Albornoz Cabrera (CUB)	Joshua Johnson (TTO)	Samid Escalona (VEN)
Second Rapid Board	Luis Fernando Ibarra Chami (MEX)	Luis Ernesto Quesada Perez (CUB)	Esteban Valderrama (COL)
First Blitz Board	Carlos Daniel Albornoz Cabrera (CUB)	Esteban Valderrama (COL)	Gilberto Hernandez (MEX)
Second Blitz Board	Jose Cardoso (COL)	Félix Ynojosa (VEN)	Luis Fernando Ibarra Chami (MEX)

=== Women's events ===
Board	Gold	Silver	Bronze
First Rapid Board	Yaniela Forgas Moreno (CUB)	Danitza Vazquez (PUR)	Liliana Fuentes (MEX)
Second Rapid Board	Valentina Argote (COL)	Yerisbel Miranda (CUB)	Natasha Morales (PUR)
First Blitz Board	Valentina Argote (COL)	Yaniela Forgas Moreno (CUB)	Danitza Vazquez (PUR)
Second Blitz Board	Liliana Fuentes (MEX)	Yerisbel Miranda (CUB)	Natasha Morales (PUR)
