= Mexican Chess Championship =

The national chess championship of Mexico has been organized annually since 1973 by FENAMAC (Spanish: Federación Nacional de Ajedrez de Mexico A.C.), the Mexican chess federation. Known since 1997 as the National Absolute Championship (Campeonato Nacional Absoluto) and previously as the National Closed Championship (Campeonato Nacional Cerrado), it was initially organized as a round-robin tournament. However, several editions in the 1990s were organized as a series of elimination matches, and the championship is currently run as a Swiss-system tournament. In some years it serves as a qualifying stage for the FIDE World Chess Championship and is designated as sub-Zonal tournament 2.3.1 in such cases. A different tournament is the Mexican Open Championship (Campeonato Nacional Abierto), which is not limited to Mexican nationals and has been held annually since 1954.

== List of winners ==
| Year | Place | Winner | Notes and references |
|---|---|---|---|
| 1973 | Mexico City | Mario Campos López | |
| 1974 | Guanajuato | Mario Campos López | |
| 1975 | Mexico City | Marcel Sisniega Campbell | |
| 1976 | Mexico City | Marcel Sisniega Campbell | |
| 1977 | Mexico City | Marcel Sisniega Campbell, Carlos Escondrillas | |
| 1978 | | Alberto Campos Ruíz | |
| 1979 | Mexico City | Marcel Sisniega Campbell | |
| 1981 | | Kenneth Frey Beckman | |
| 1982–1983 | | Marcel Sisniega Campbell | Sisniega defeated Frey in a tiebreak match held in Mexico City in 1983 after they tied for first in the main tournament held in 1982. |
| 1983 | Xalapa | Kenneth Frey Beckman | |
| 1984 | | Kenneth Frey Beckman | |
| 1985 | | Humberto Morales Moreno | |
| 1986 | Mexico City | Kenneth Frey Beckman, Rafael Espinosa Flores | |
| 1987 | Mexico City | J. Jesús González Mata | |
| 1988 | Mexico City | Marcel Sisniega Campbell | |
| 1989 | Mexico City | Marcel Sisniega Campbell | |
| 1990 | Villahermosa | Marcel Sisniega Campbell | |
| 1992 | Mexico City | Gilberto Hernandez Guerrero | |
| 1993 | Linares | Roberto Martín del Campo Cárdenas | Del Campo defeated Sisniega in a playoff match after they tied for first in the main tournament. |
| 1994 | | Gilberto Hernandez Guerrero | An elimination format was used. |
| 1995 | | Gilberto Hernandez Guerrero | An elimination format was used. |
| 1996 | | José Gonzalez Garcia | An elimination format was used. Gonzalez Garcia defeated Rafael Espinosa Flores in the finale, held in Monterrey. |
| 1997 | Morelia | Roberto Calderín Gonzalez | |
| 1998–1999 | León | Alfonso Almeida | |
| 1999 | Mexico City | Israel Blanco Sing | Blanco Sing won on tiebreak over Alberto Escobedo Tinajero. |
| 2000 | Mexico City | Rafael Espinosa Flores | |
| 2001 | Pachuca | Alberto Escobedo Tinajero | |
| 2002 | Mexico City | Rafael Espinosa Flores | |
| 2003 | Hermosillo | Dionisio Aldama Degurnay | |
| 2004 | Pachuca | Juan Carlos Gonzalez Zamora | |
| 2005 | Pachuca | Alberto Escobedo Tinajero | |
| 2006 | Ciudad Juárez | Juan Carlos Gonzalez Zamora | |
| 2007 | Pachuca | Juan Carlos Gonzalez Zamora | |
| 2008 | Mexico City | Rafael Espinosa Flores | Espinosa won on tiebreak over Gilberto Hernandez Guerrero and Juan Carlos Gonzalez Zamora. |
| 2009 | Huatulco | Gilberto Hernandez Guerrero | |
| 2010 | Mexico City | Manuel León Hoyos | |
| 2011 | Tapachula | Juan Carlos Gonzalez Zamora | |
| 2012 | Mexico City | Juan Carlos Gonzalez Zamora | |
| 2013 | Mexico City | Juan Carlos Gonzalez Zamora | Gonzalez Zamora won on tiebreak over Luis Fernand Ibarra Chami. |
| 2014 | Mexico City | Juan Carlos Gonzalez Zamora | |
| 2015 | Mexico City | Sergio Joshafatt Morales Garcia | Morales Garcia won on tiebreak over Roberto Martín del Campo Cárdenas. |
| 2016 | Morelia | Juan Carlos Gonzalez Zamora | Gonzalez Zamora won on tiebreak over Gilberto Hernandez Guerrero, Uriel Capo Vidal, Nestor Cofre Archibold and Isaac Antonio Garcia Guerrero. |
| 2018 | Mexico City | Juan Carlos Gonzalez Zamora | |
