= Super 8 =

Super 8 or Super Eight may refer to:

== Film ==
- Super 8 film, a motion picture film format released in 1965
- Super 8 camera, a motion picture camera used to film Super 8mm motion picture format
- Super 8 (2011 film), a science-fiction film written and directed by J. J. Abrams
- Super 8 Stories, a 2001 documentary film

== Sport ==
- Rugby League Super 8s, Great Britain
- Super 8 (cricket round), at the Cricket World Cup
- Super Eight (baseball), high school tournament hosted by Campanelli Stadium in Massachusetts, United States
- Super 8 (hockey), high school ice hockey tournament, Massachusetts, United States
- Super 8 Boxing Tournament, New Zealand
- Super 8 (Handball League), England
- All-Ireland Super 8s, Gaelic football

== Music ==
- Super Eight (group), Japanese pop group, previously known as Kanjani Eight.
- Super 8 (album), 1999 album by Züri West
- super8 (musical group), Danish music group
- Super8, a DJ of the duo Super8 & Tab
- Super 8 (band), an American rock band from Los Angeles, California active from 1993 to 1997.
- Super 8, a song by Swedish singer Little Jinder.

== Technology ==
- Zilog Z8, the Zilog Super-8 family microcontroller architecture

== Other ==
- "Super 8" (The Killing), television series episode
- Super 8 (video game accessory), a 1995-era adaptor for playing NES games on Nintendo SNES systems
- Super 8 (hotel), also named Super 8 Worldwide
- Super 8 schools, association of boys' schools in the central North Island of New Zealand
- Super 8, a chocolate-covered biscuit mainly sold in Chile and made by Nestlé

== See also ==
- Super 8½, 1994 satirical film
- Simple8, British theatre company
