= Leonid Gofshtein =

Israeli chess grandmaster (1953–2015)

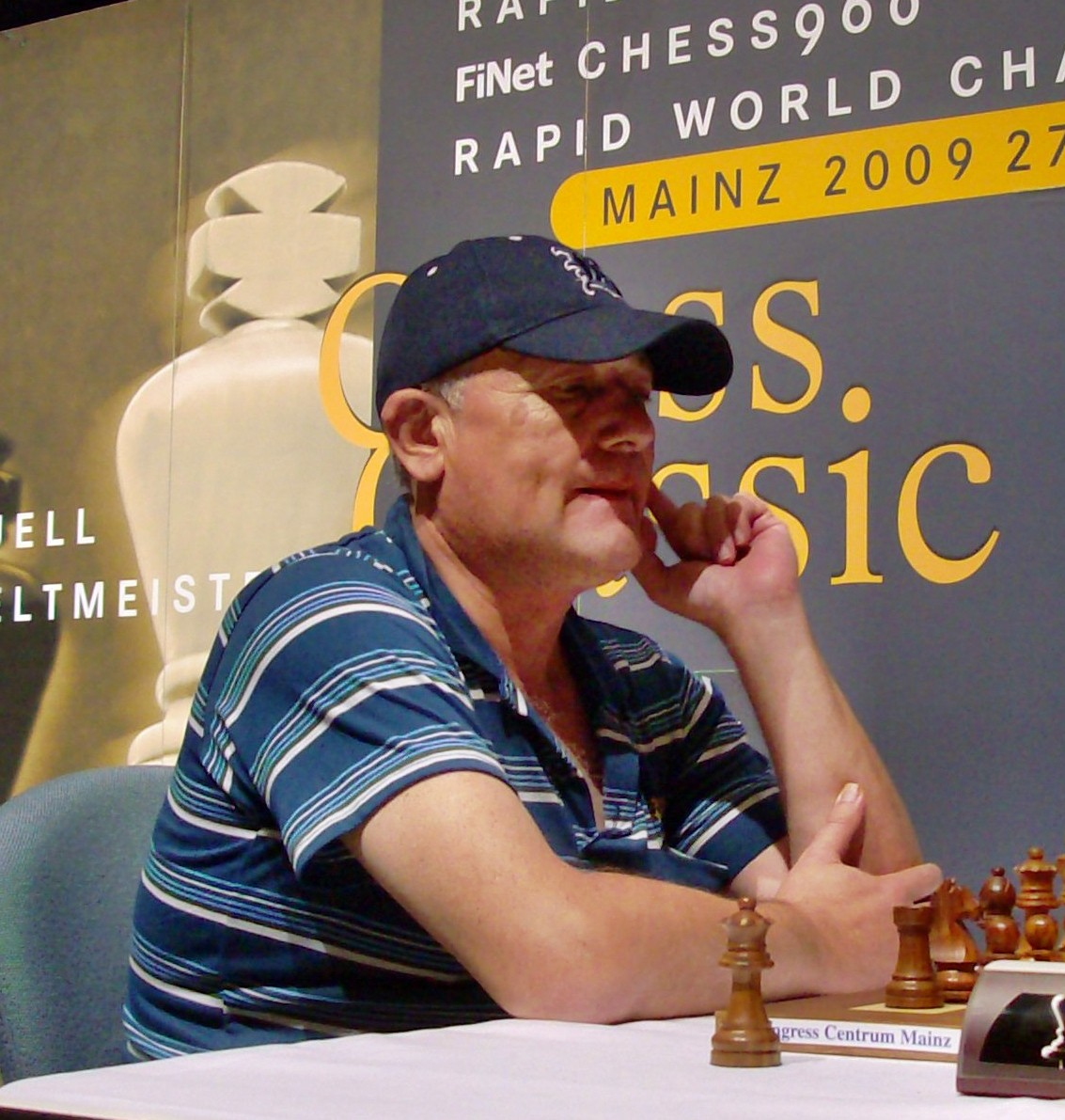

Personal information
- Native name: זבולון גופשטיין
- Born: 21 April 1953 Ukrainian SSR, Soviet Union
- Died: 25 December 2015 (aged 62) Israel

Chess career
- Country: Israel (after 1991); Soviet Union (before 1991)
- Title: Grandmaster
- Peak rating: 2585 (January 2000)

Leonid Gofshtein (also known by his Hebrew name Zvulon Gofshtein Hebrew: זבולון גופשטיין; 21 April 1953 – 25 December 2015) was an Israeli chess grandmaster. He emigrated from the Ukrainian SSR to Israel in 1990.

In 1999 he tied for 1st–5th with Mikhail Gurevich, Aleksandar Berelovich, Sergei Tiviakov and Rustam Kasimdzhanov in the open section of the Hoogeveen International tournament. In 2000 he came second in the Tel Aviv International tournament and tied for 2nd–6th with Roman Slobodjan, Ventzislav Inkiov, Giorgi Bagaturov and Stefan Đurić in the Arco Chess Festival. In 2004 he tied for 1st–3rd with Michael Roiz and Evgeniy Najer in the Ashdod Chess Festival. In 2006, tied for 2nd–5th with Slavko Cicak, José González García and Josep Manuel Lopez Martinez in the VIII Sants Open.

He played for Israel in the 30th Chess Olympiad in Manila 1992. On the May 2010 FIDE list his Elo rating was 2537.

Gofshtein's handle on the Internet Chess Club was "Orange". He died on 25 December 2015 after a long illness.
