= Slavko Cicak =

Swedish chess grandmaster (born 1969)

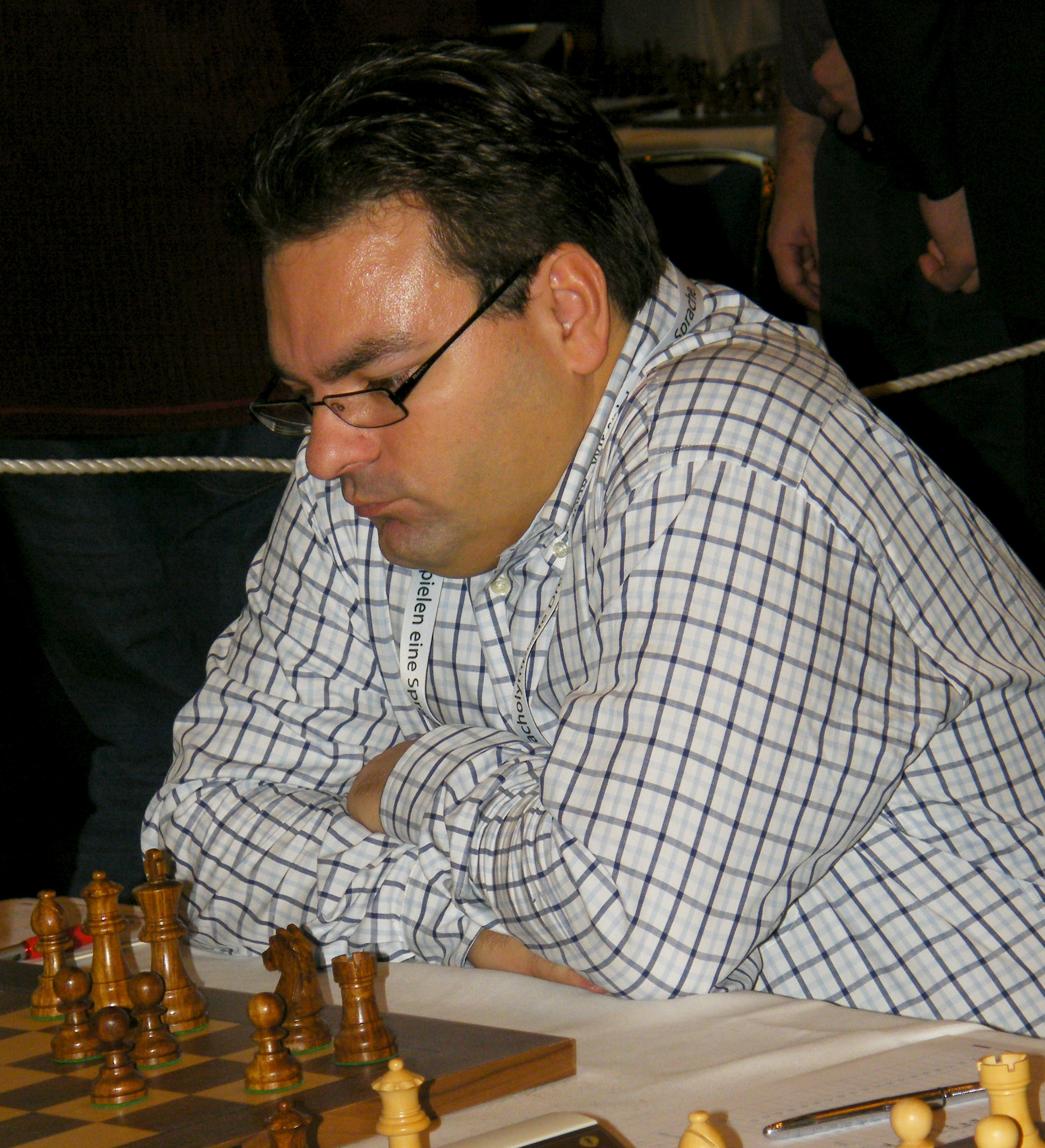
- Dresden 2008

Personal information
- Born: October 25, 1969 (age 56) Podgorica, SR Montenegro, Yugoslavia

Chess career
- Country: Sweden
- Title: Grandmaster (2001)
- FIDE rating: 2444 (July 2026)
- Peak rating: 2576 (September 2009)

Slavko Cicak (born 25 October 1969) is a Swedish chess player. He was awarded the title Grandmaster by FIDE in 2001.

== Biography ==
He played for Sweden in the Chess Olympiad in 2006, 2008 and 2010 and in the European Team Chess Championship in 2007. In 2005 he tied for 6th–9th with Normunds Miezis, Joel Benjamin and Alexander Baburin in the European Union Championship. In 2006 he tied for 2nd–5th with Leonid Gofshtein, José González García and Josep Manuel Lopez Martinez in the 8th Sants Open. In 2012, he shared first place with Hans Tikkanen and Emanuel Berg at the Västerås Open.
