= Dear Chickens =

- Directed by: Mauro Mueller
- Written by: Mauro Mueller; Jennie Allen
- Produced by: Björn Hering; Mauro Mueller; Timon Birkhofer; David Figueroa García
- Starring: Philip Baker Hall; Kerris Dorsey; James Eckhouse; Linda Park
- Cinematography: Andrea González Mereles
- Edited by: Steven Wilsey; David Figueroa García
- Music by: Lucas Lechowski
- Production company: Fidelio Films
- Release date: 27 July 2018 (LA Shorts Fest)
- Running time: 14 minutes
- Countries: United States; Switzerland; Mexico
- Language: English

Dear Chickens is a short dramedy. The film's run time is 14 minutes. It was directed by Mauro Mueller, co-written by Mauro Mueller and Jennie Allen, produced by Björn Hering, Mauro Mueller, Timon Birkhofer, and David Figueroa García, and co-produced by Rocio Lopez. The film was shot by Mexican cinematographer Andrea González Mereles.

The short film qualified to the Academy Awards for Best Live Action Short Film in 2019. The short film screened at various festivals including LA Shorts Fest in 2018, winning best actor for Philip Baker Hall, Zurich Film Festival as part of a series of films about cancer, FILMETS Badalona Film Festival (also winning best actor for Philip Baker Hall), Mexico Shortsfest 2019, HollyShorts Film Festival, and Pendance Film Festival in Toronto. This was Baker Hall's final film appearance before his death in 2022.

== Plot ==
When a stubborn old man (Philip Baker Hall) and a fretful teenaged girl (Kerris Dorsey) are forced to share a hospital room, an unexpected friendship forms over their hatred of fake cheerfulness and bad hospital food. The film is a comedy-drama.

== Awards ==
The film won best actor at LA Shorts Fest and Filmets Badalona Film Festival in Barcelona for Philip Baker Hall.

== Cast ==
- Philip Baker Hall as Emil
- Kerris Dorsey as Nora
- James Eckhouse as Dr. Friedman
- Linda Park as Nurse Stephanie

== Release ==
On 27 July 2018, the film had its world premiere at LA Shorts Fest in Los Angeles. The film had its European premiere at the Solothurn Film Festival in the short film competition section and in Mexico at Shortsfest in September 2018.
