= Luis Ernesto Quesada Pérez =

Peruan-Mexican chess grandmaster (born 1999)

Personal information
- Born: January 4, 1999 (age 27) Ciego de Ávila, Cuba

Chess career
- Country: Cuba (until 2025); Mexico (since 2025)
- Title: Grandmaster (2018)
- FIDE rating: 2542 (October 2026)
- Peak rating: 2581 (October 2024)

Luis Ernesto Quesada Pérez (born January 4, 1999) is a Cuban-Mexican chess grandmaster.

== Chess career ==
In January 2020, Quesada started with 6 wins out of 6 games in the Open International Tournament.

In February 2023, Quesada finished fourth in the Cuban Chess Championship, after losing to Lelys Stanley Martinez Duany and Carlos Daniel Albornoz Cabrera on tiebreaks for second place.

In May 2023, Quesada finished third in the 56th Capablanca Memorial, behind winner Jonas Buhl Bjerre and runner-up Alexandr Fier.

In July 2023, Quesada finished second on board 2 in the rapid portion of the Central American and Caribbean Games.

Quesada competed in the Chess World Cup 2023, where he was defeated by Emre Can in the first round.
