= Jaime Alexander Cuartas =

Colombian chess grandmaster (born 1975)

Jaime Cuartas
- Jaime Cuartas in Barcelona, 2010

Personal information
- Born: October 28, 1975 (age 51) Medellín, Colombia

Chess career
- Country: Colombia
- Title: Grandmaster (2009)
- FIDE rating: 2487 (November 2026)
- Peak rating: 2548 (November 2009)

Jaime Alexander Cuartas (born 28 October 1975) is a Colombian chess Grandmaster and coach.

== Career ==
Cuartas has been one of Colombia's leading chess players since the early 2000s. He represented Colombia in four Chess Olympiads in 2002, 2004, 2006, and 2009, playing on board one in one edition. He fulfilled his Grandmaster norms at the 2006 and 2008 Olympiads, and FIDE officially awarded him the GM title in 2009.

In 2003, Cuartas won a round-robin tournament in Medellín ahead of Alonso Zapata. In 2004, he took first place at an open tournament in Cali. At the 2006 Colombian Chess Championship in Arauca, he finished as runner-up behind Gildardo García. That same year, he won in Barcelona and tied for first place in Badalona with Josep Manuel López Martínez.

In 2008, he shared first place in Sitges alongside Zbigniew Pakleza, Alexei Barsov, and Karen Movsziszian. In 2009, he tied for first place in La Pobla de Lillet with Lelys Stanley Martínez Duany.

He reached his peak FIDE rating of 2548 in November 2009, when he was ranked first among Colombian chess players.
