= Mark Raso =

Canadian filmmaker

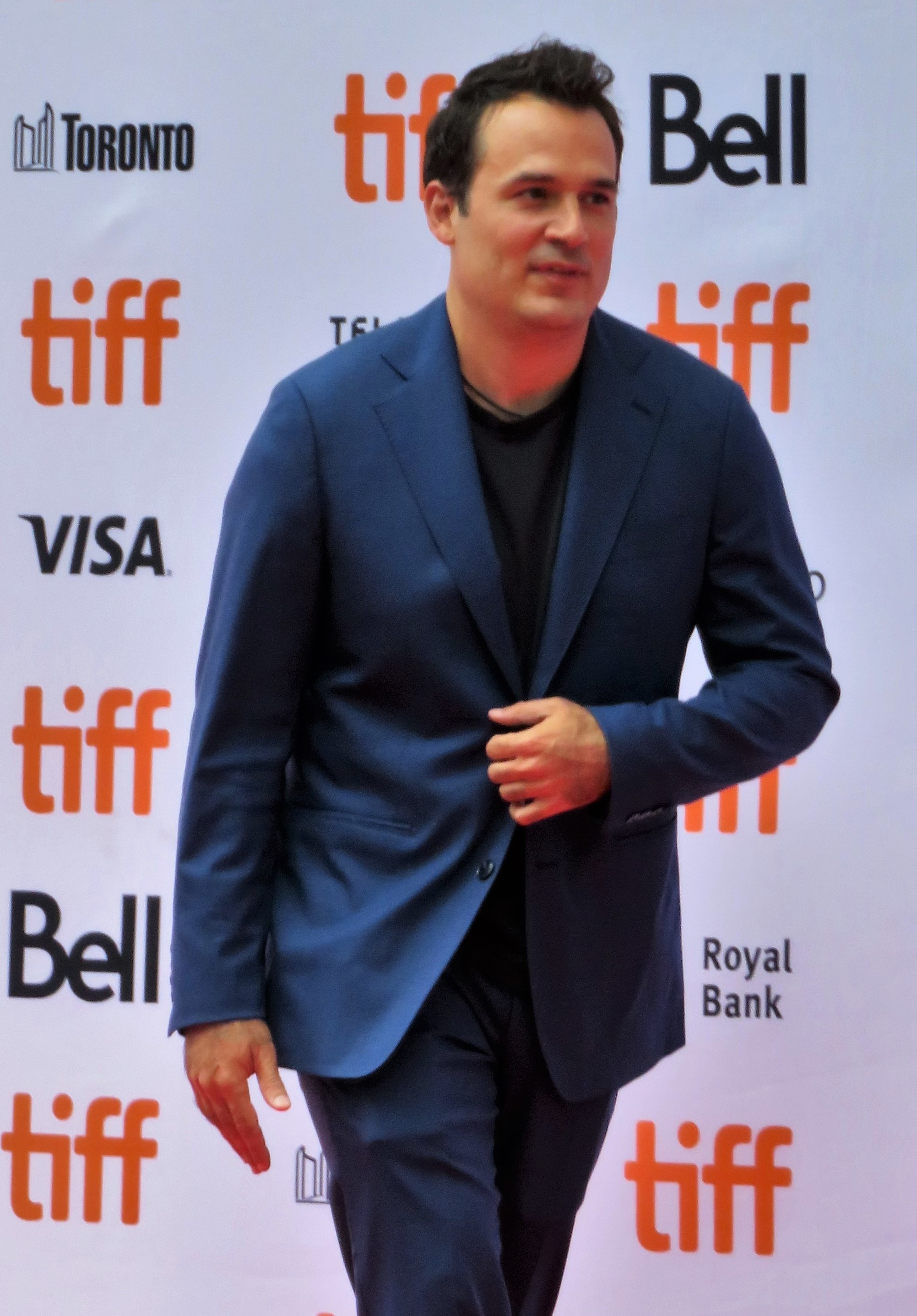
- Born: Toronto, Ontario, Canada
- Education: University of Toronto (BA); Columbia University (MFA)
- Occupation: Filmmaker
- Years active: 2009–present
- Notable work: Under, Copenhagen, Kodachrome

Mark Raso is a Canadian narrative filmmaker and co-owner of the production company Fidelio Films. He is best known for writing and directing the feature-length film Copenhagen in 2014, directing Kodachrome starring Ed Harris, Jason Sudeikis and Elizabeth Olsen, and the Netflix original sci-fi film Awake in 2021, which was number one worldwide on the platform when it was released and his Student Academy Award–winning short film Under in 2012. His work has won numerous awards and has been seen by audiences worldwide.

== Early life ==
Raso was born in Toronto, Ontario, Canada. After attending the University of Toronto where he received a BA in English Literature and Cinema Studies, Raso went on to study directing and screenwriting at Columbia University where he received an MFA in film. While attending Columbia, Raso wrote, directed, and produced a number of short films that culminated in winning the Gold Medal, the highest honor a student can receive, from the Student Academy Awards of Motion Picture Arts and Sciences.

After graduating from Columbia in 2012, Raso wrote, directed, his first feature-length film Copenhagen, a critically acclaimed movie that won the Audience Award at Slamdance Film Festival. Since its premiere, Raso has been called "a talent to watch," by New York Times writer David DeWitt.

== Awards ==
Raso's short film Under has received numerous awards including the Student Academy Gold Medal, the CINE Gold Eagle Award, the Golden ACE Award, and the CINE Special Jury award. In addition, Mark received the David Jones Memorial Award for Excellence in Directing and the Hollywood Foreign Press Award for Excellence in Filmmaking. By 2013 he was named on The Tracking Board's "Young and Hungry" list as a rising talent to keep an eye out for. In 2014 his first feature film Copenhagen premiered at the Slamdance Festival, where it won the Audience Award. The film also won the grand jury award at the Florida Film Festival, Gasparilla International Film Festival, and Slamdance Film Festival.

== Fidelio Films ==
Raso is co-owner of the production company Fidelio Films, a New York City-based independent film production company founded by producers David Figueroa García, Mauro Mueller and Mauricio Leiva-Cock in 2010. All four of them met while studying at the MFA program in directing and screenwriting at Columbia University. The company has produced a number of acclaimed short films, winning twice in a row in the Student Academy Awards with Under in 2012 and A World for Raúl in 2013. In 2014, for the third time in a row, they had a short Perfidia in the regional final of the Student Academy Awards. Their first feature film Copenhagen, featuring Gethin Anthony, Bodil Awards winner Frederikke Dahl Hansen, Sebastian Armesto, Mille Dinesen, Baard Owe, and Tamzin Merchant was theatrically released in North America in 2014.

== Filmography ==
- Groomed (2004, short film, producer)
- The Engagement Party (2007, short film, writer, editor, director)
- Tomorrow (2009, short film, writer, director)
- Brand New Day (2010, short film, director, producer, editor)
- In for a Surprise (2010, short film, director, writer)
- Under (2011, short film, co-producer, writer, director, editor)
- Un Mundo Para Raul (A World for Raúl) (2012, short film, co-producer)
- Copenhagen (2014, feature film, writer, director, editor, co-producer)
- Kodachrome (2017)
- Awake (2021)
- The Ugly Chickens (2024, short film)

== Television ==
- Guideposts Junction (1995–1996)
