= Luis Ibarra =

Luis Ibarra is the name of

- Luis Ibarra (footballer) (1937-2013), Chilean football manager and former player
- Luis Ibarra (boxer) (born 1953), Panamanian boxer
- Luis Ibarra (athlete) (born 1965), Brazilian marathon runner
- Luis Enrique Ibarra (born 1980), Mexican steeplechase runner
- Luis Fernando Ibarra Chami (born 1989), Mexican chess grandmaster
