= Josep Manuel López Martínez =

Spanish chess grandmaster (born 1980)

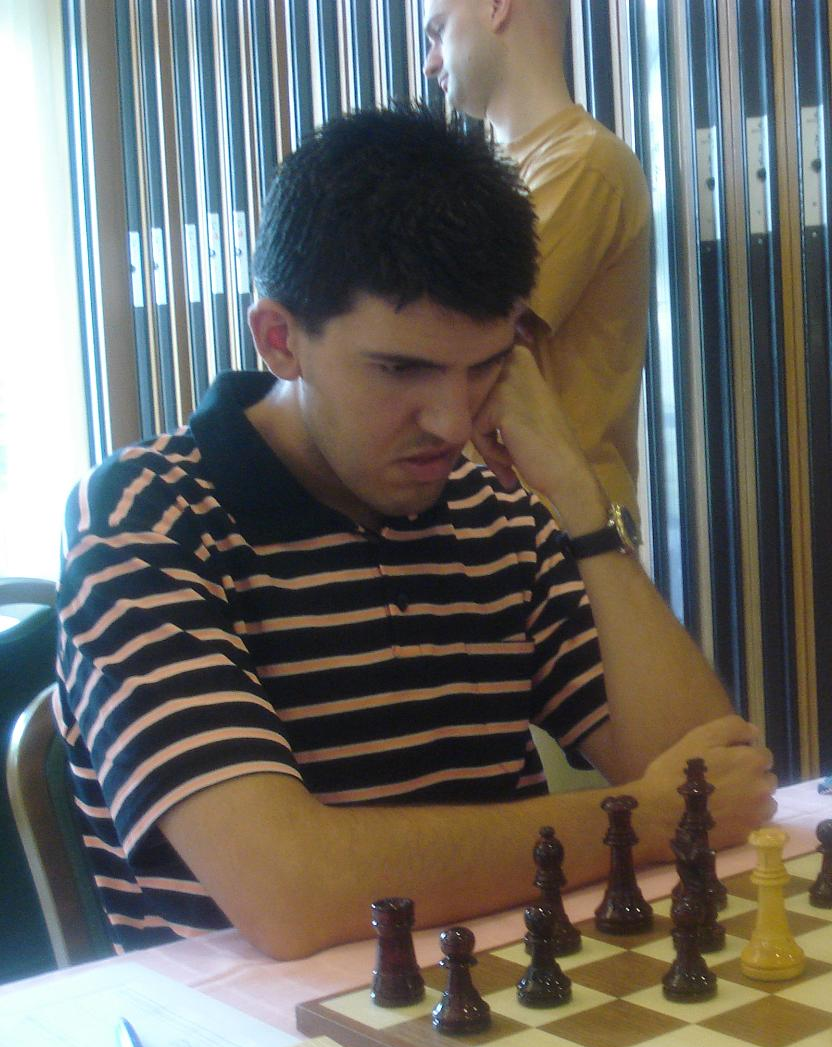

Personal information
- Born: April 24, 1980 (age 46) Barcelona, Spain

Chess career
- Country: Spain
- Title: Grandmaster (2007)
- FIDE rating: 2486 (July 2026)
- Peak rating: 2607 (September 2017)

Josep Manuel López Martínez is a Spanish chess grandmaster.

== Career ==
In 1997, he had a notable victory against Francisco Vallejo Pons in the Spanish Youth Championship, where he ultimately finished third.

In 2006, he tied for 2nd–5th with Slavko Cicak, José González García and Leonid Gofshtein in the VIII Sants Open.

He achieved the Grandmaster title in 2007, earning his norms at the:

- Int Navidad Ciudad de Mataro in January 2005
- III Magistral Ciutat de Badalona in March 2005
- VIII Open Vila de Salou in June 2006

In September 2024, he tied for second place with Thomas Beerdsen, Pepe Cuenca, Lev Yankelevich, and Paolo Ladron De Guevara Pinto in the Gáldar Open.
