= Joshua Johnson (chess player) =

Trinidadian chess player (born 1999)

Personal information
- Born: February 1, 1999 (age 27)

Chess career
- Country: Trinidad and Tobago
- Title: FIDE Master (2014)
- Peak rating: 2359 (June 2024)

Joshua Johnson (born February 1, 1999) is a Trinidadian chess player. He has been the highest-rated player of his country and was the national U12 champion.

== Chess career ==
In October 2014, he earned the FIDE Master by winning the U16 category of the CAC Youth Chess tournament.

In December 2018, he won the Promenade Chess Club International City Chess Tournament.

In May 2023, he earned his final IM norm at the Continental Chess Championship (only needing to surpass 2400 rating to earn the title). He recorded the best performance by a Trinidadian player at the event and increased his rating to place him as the second highest rated player in the English-speaking Caribbean.

In June 2023, he represented his country at the Central American and Caribbean Games, where he earned the silver medal on the first rapid board.

In January 2024, he was named as the T&T Chess Association's Sportsperson of the Year due to his winning of the national championship.

== Personal life ==
He studied at the University of the West Indies.
