= A World for Raúl =

- Directed by: Mauro Mueller
- Written by: Mauro Mueller
- Produced by: Laura Pino; Mauro Mueller; Ivan Madeo; Urs Frey
- Starring: Alexandré Barceló; Adrián Alonso; Gerardo Taracena; Roberto Luis Meza; Adriana Paz
- Cinematography: César Gutiérrez Miranda
- Edited by: Mauro Mueller
- Music by: Lucas Lechowski
- Production companies: Fidelio Films; Contrast Film
- Release date: 12 June 2012 (Outfest)
- Running time: 15 minutes
- Countries: Mexico; United States; Switzerland
- Language: Spanish

A World for Raúl (Spanish: Un mundo para Raúl) is a short drama film. The film's run time is 15 minutes. It was written and directed by Mauro Mueller, and produced by Laura Pino and Ivan Madeo. It won a Student Academy Awards in 2013. The film was shot using a Sony F3 by cinematographer César Gutiérrez Miranda. The short film included on the DVD Boys on Film 14: Worlds Collide.

== Plot ==
In the film, the thirteen-year-old Raúl (Alexandré Barceló) in Mexico is asked to entertain the local landowner's son, Hernán, played by Adrián Alonso. Soon, a game of power and pride starts between the two boys from different social classes. The film is a coming-of-age story.

== Awards ==
Mauro, a 28-year-old Columbia University School of the Arts student at the time, won in narrative category of the Student Academy Awards. The film won also Best Dramatic Short at NY Shortsfest, 2013, Best Student Short Film at Aspen Shortsfest, 2013, CINE Special Jury Award (CINE Golden Eagle Film & Video Competition), 2013, Best film at hammer to nail short film contest, 2012, CINE Golden Eagle Award, 2012 and Best fiction film at Skena Up, 2012. The film was also a winner of the Golden Horseman Best Short Fiction Film at Filmfest Dresden.

Other awards:

- Best Screenplay at Festival of Nations in Lenzing, Austria 2014
- The Golden Sun Jury award at Best of Short Film Festival at La Ciotat, 2013
- Jury Award for Best Narrative Short at Polari Film Festival Austin, 2013
- Best Fiction at Festival LA de Video y Artes Audiovisuales Rosario 2013
- Best Dramatic Short at Long Beach QFilm Festival, 2013
- Upcoming Talents Award at Solothurner Filmtage, 2013
- Accolade Competition, Awards of Excellence, 2012
- Student Select Best Writing Award at Columbia University Film Festival 2012
- IFP Audience Choice Award at Columbia University Film Festival 2012
- Faculty Selects + Student Selects at Columbia University Film Festival 2012
- Big Beach Award for Best Director at the Columbia University Film Festival 2012

== Cast ==
- Alexandré Barceló as Raúl
- Adrián Alonso as Hernán
- Gerardo Taracena as Juan, Raúl's father
- Roberto Luis Meza as Mr. Tamero, Hernán's father
- Adriana Paz as Raúl's mother

== Release ==
On 15 July 2012, the film had its world premiere at Outfest Film Festival in Los Angeles. The film had its European premiere at the 28th Warsaw International Film Festival in October 2012 in the Competition Short Films section and in Mexico at Morelia International Film Festival in November 2012. The film went on to screen at the Solothurn Film Festival, the Aspen Shortsfest and the Palm Springs International Festival of Short Films.
