= Carlos Torre Repetto Memorial =

Chess tournament held in Mexico

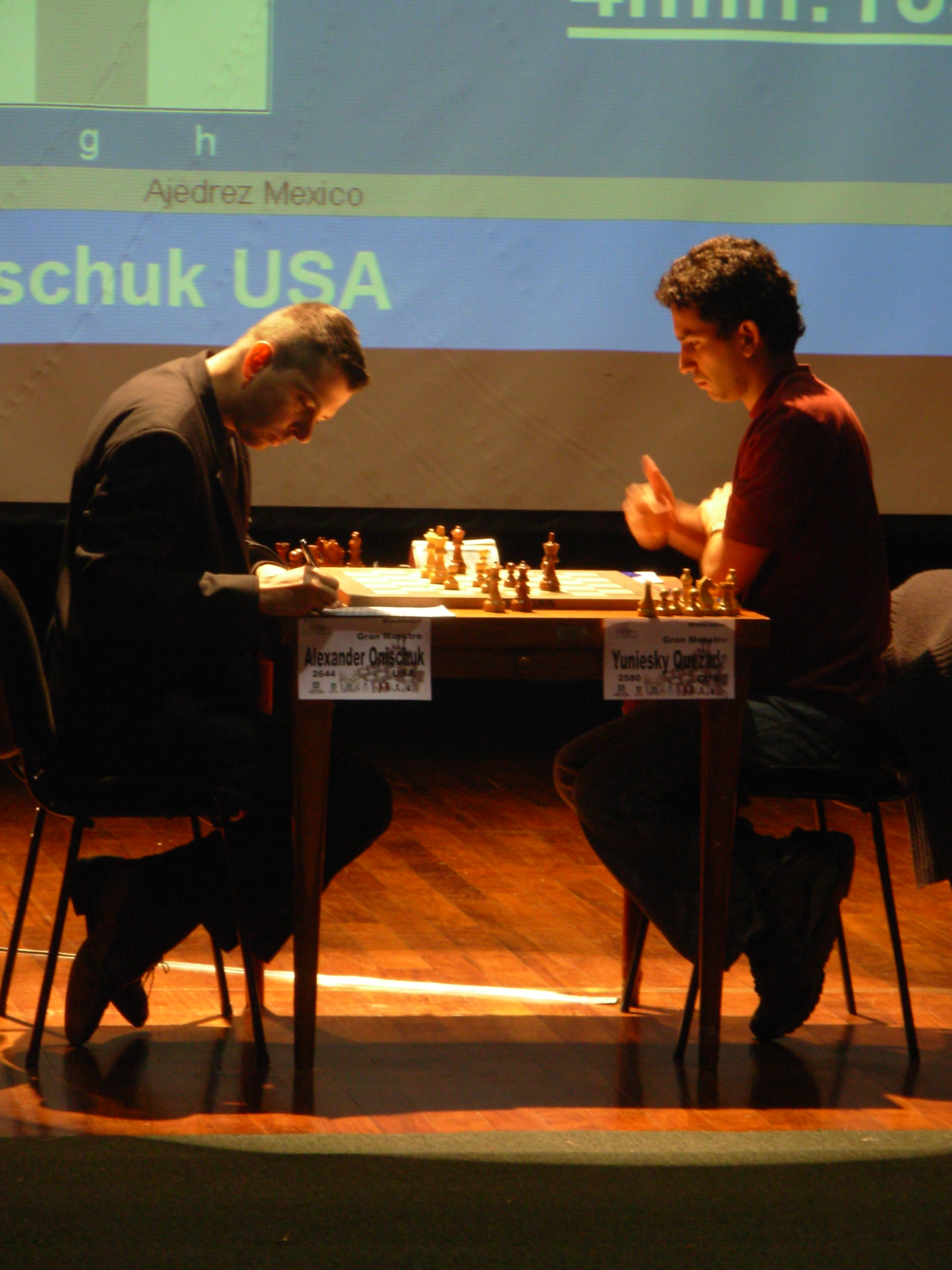
Mérida 2008, the final – Alexander Onischuk vs Yuniesky Quesada Pérez.

The Torre Memorial is an annual chess tournament played in honour of the chess legend Carlos Torre Repetto (1905–1978). It is played in Mérida, Yucatán, Mexico. The first edition was played in 1987, and from a relatively weak tournament, it has now grown into a strong international tournament.

== Winners ==
#	Year	Winner
1	1987	Roberto Martín del Campo (Mexico)
2	1989	Marcel Sisniega Campbell (Mexico)
3	1990	Marcel Sisniega Campbell (Mexico)
4	1991	Marcel Sisniega Campbell (Mexico)
5	1992	Gilberto Hernández (Mexico)
6	1993	Gilberto Hernández (Mexico)
7	1994	Gildardo García (Colombia)
8	1995	Gilberto Hernández (Mexico)
9	1996	Roberto Martín del Campo (Mexico)
10	1997	Jesús Nogueiras (Cuba)
11	1998	Larry Christiansen (USA)
12	1999	Tony Miles (England)
13	2000	Valerij Filippov (Russia)
14	2001	Leinier Domínguez (Cuba)
15	2002	Valerij Filippov (Russia)
16	2003	Yuniesky Quesada (Cuba)
17	2004	Vasily Ivanchuk (Ukraine)
18	2005	Lázaro Bruzón (Cuba)
19	2006	Vasily Ivanchuk (Ukraine)
20	2007	Vasily Ivanchuk (Ukraine)
21	2008	Alexander Onischuk (United States)
22	2010	Emilio Cordova (Peru)
23	2011	Fidel Corrales Jimenez (Cuba)
24	2012	Aryam Abreu Delgado (Cuba)
25	2013	Lázaro Bruzón (Cuba)
26	2014	Lázaro Bruzón (Cuba)
27	2015	Lázaro Bruzón (Cuba)
28	2016	Lázaro Bruzón (Cuba)
29	2017	Emilio Cordova (Peru)
30	2018	Carlos Daniel Albornoz Cabrera (Cuba)
31	2019	Carlos Daniel Albornoz Cabrera (Cuba)
32	2022	José Martínez Alcántara (Peru)
33	2023	Carlos Daniel Albornoz Cabrera (Cuba)
34	2024	José Martínez Alcántara (Peru)
