= Roberto Martín del Campo =

Mexican chess player (born 1967)

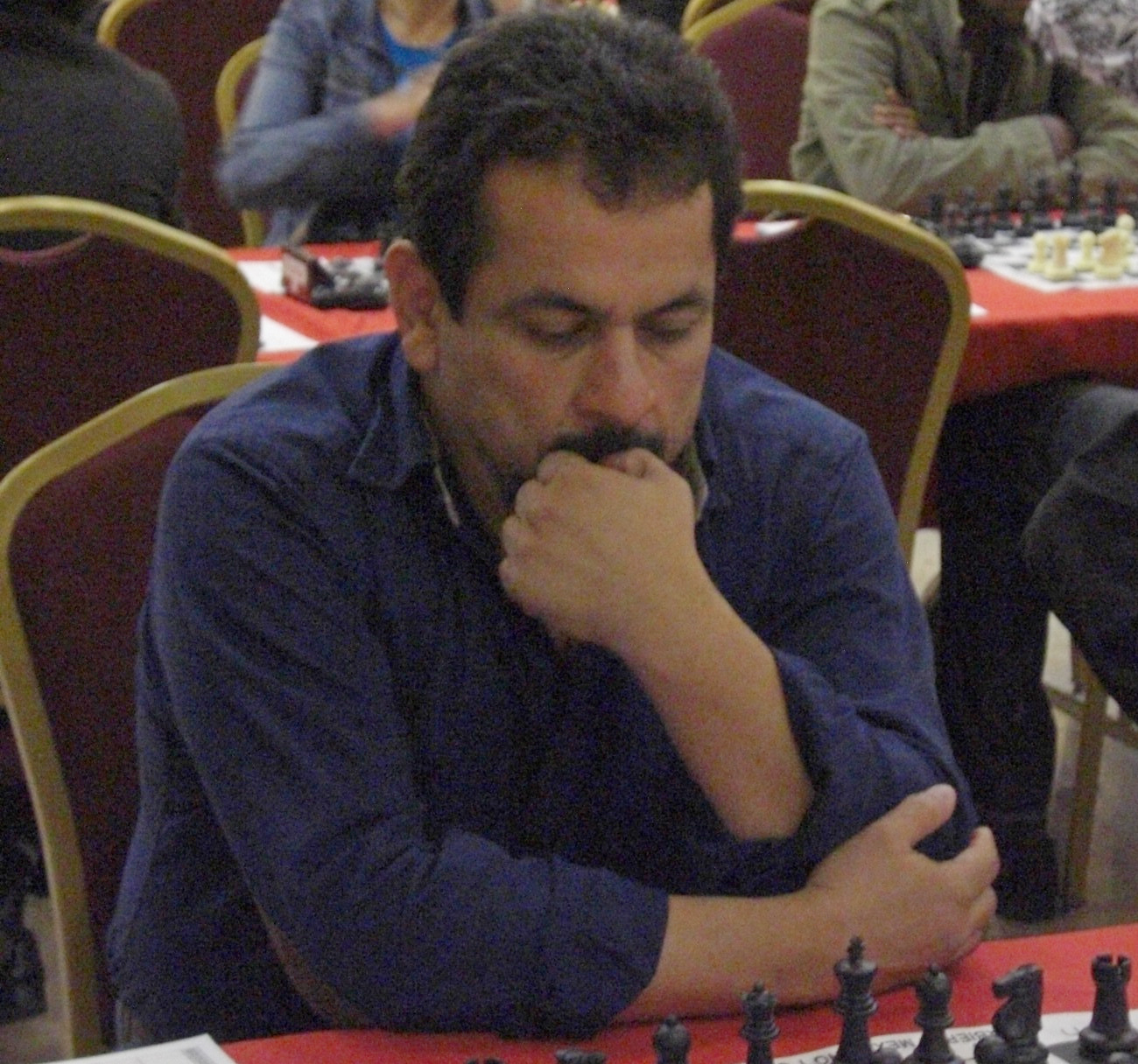
- Roberto Martín del Campo in 2011

Personal information
- Born: May 26, 1967 (age 59)

Chess career
- Country: Mexico
- Title: International Master (1987)
- Peak rating: 2485 (July 1997)

Roberto Abel Martín del Campo Cárdenas (born 1967) is a Mexican chess International Master (IM) (1987), Mexican Chess Championship medalist (1987, 1988), Chess Olympiad individual gold medalist (1990).

== Biography ==
In 1985, Roberto Martín del Campo won the Mexican Junior Chess Championship in the U20 age group. Also he won the Mexican Junior Chess Championship twice in the U26 age group (1986, 1987). In 1987, he played for Mexico in the World Junior Chess Championship in the Philippines. In 1987, Roberto Martín del Campo won silver medal in the Mexican Chess Championship and won the Pan American Junior Chess Championship. In 1988, he won bronze medal in the Mexican Chess Championship. Roberto Martín del Campo was winner of many international chess tournaments including Managua (1991), Mexico City (1994), Chicago (1995, 1996), Miami (2005), and Charlotte (2016). In 1996, he won the Carlos Torre Repetto Memorial tournament.

Roberto Martín del Campo played for Mexico in the Chess Olympiads:

- In 1990, at fourth board in the 29th Chess Olympiad in Novi Sad (+6, =3, -1) and won individual gold medal,
- In 1992, at third board in the 30th Chess Olympiad in Manila (+6, =5, -3),
- In 1998, at second board in the 33rd Chess Olympiad in Elista (+2, =3, -4).

Roberto Martín del Campo played for Mexico in the Panamerican Team Chess Championship:

- In 1991, at fourth board in the 4th Panamerican Team Chess Championship in Guarapuava (+2, =2, -2).

Roberto Martín del Campo played for Mexico in the World Youth U26 Team Chess Championships:

- In 1985, at second reserve board in the 5th World Youth U26 Team Chess Championship in Mendoza (+5, =1, -2),
- In 1993, at second board in the 9th World Youth U26 Team Chess Championship in Paranaguá (+4, =5, -0).

In 1987, Roberto Martín del Campo was awarded the FIDE International Master (IM) title.

In March 2016, Martín del Campo tied for first place with FM Alexander Velikanov in the Charlotte Chess Center's IM Norm Invitational held in Charlotte, North Carolina with a score of 6.5/9.

In May 2021, Martín del Campo tied for first place with IM Alexander Matros and FM Robby Adamson in the Charlotte Chess Center's Memorial Day IM Norm Invitational held in Charlotte, North Carolina with an undefeated score of 5.5/9.
