= Arcola Theatre =

Theatre in Hackney, London, England

- Interactive map of Arcola Theatre
- Location: Dalston; London, E8; United Kingdom
- Coordinates: 51.551944°N 0.073889°W
- Owner: Arcola Theatre Production Company
- Capacity: 200 (main house); 100 (studio)
- Production: Repertory productions
- Public transit: Dalston Junction; Dalston Kingsland

Construction
- Opened: 2000; 26 years ago
- Rebuilt: 2010–11

Website
- arcolatheatre.com

Arcola Theatre is in the London Borough of Hackney. It presents plays, operas and musicals featuring established and emerging artists.

The theatre building, in the former Colourworks paint factory on Ashwin Street, Dalston, houses two studio theatre spaces, two rehearsal studios and a café-bar. In 2021 the theatre opened Arcola Outside, also on Ashwin Street.

Since 2007 the Green Arcola project has aimed to make Arcola the world's first carbon-neutral theatre.

== History ==
Arcola Theatre was founded by Artistic Director Mehmet Ergen, and Executive Producer Leyla Nazli in September 2000.

Its original location was a former textile factory on Arcola Street in Dalston. The theatre celebrated this with its fifth anniversary production, The Factory Girls by Frank McGuinness. In January 2011 the Arcola moved to a former paint-manufacturing workshop on Ashwin Street in Dalston, after its previous landlord earmarked the Arcola Street site for redevelopment as apartments. It marked the move by premiering The Painter, a play about J. M. W. Turner by Rebecca Lenkiewicz.

Since its inception the theatre has twice won the Peter Brook Empty Space Award and was awarded Time Out Live Awards in 2003 and 2006.

In 2007, an Arcola co-production of Mojo Mickey by Owen McCafferty became its first West End transfer to the Trafalgar Studios. 2007 also marked the first year of the Arcola's Grimeborn, an opera and musical theatre festival that now runs for six weeks in August and September.

The theatre claims to be committed to achieving carbon-neutral status and a research project, Arcola Energy, "bringing together the creative mindset and the engineering methodology", is established on the building's top floor to develop and market hydrogen fuel cells, with the profits subsidising the theatre's community arts projects. Simple8's 2008 production at the Arcola, The Living Unknown Soldier, was the first show to be powered by the venue's hydrogen fuel cell. Peak power consumption for lighting was said to be 4.5 kW, or "up to 60 percent less than comparable lighting installations".
