= Alfonso Almeida =

Mexican chess player (born 1966)

Personal information
- Born: October 12, 1966 (age 59)

Chess career
- Country: Mexico
- Title: International Master (1997)
- Peak rating: 2440 (July 1996)

Alfonso Almeida Saenz (born 12 October 1966) is a Mexican chess International Master. On the July 2009 FIDE rating list he had an Elo rating of 2,378, making him the number nine Mexican chess player. His peak rating was 2,429 in April 2007 (2,440 in 1996). In the 2015 season of the US Chess League, he had 7 MVP points and a 2,735 performance rating.

Almeida was the Mexican Open Champion in 1991 and Mexican Absolute Champion in 1998–1999. He tied for second place at the U.S. Open 2006 in Chicago. In 2004, he was a Mexican Team member at the 36th Chess Olympiad in Calvia, Spain.

Titles

- FIDE International Master 1996
- FIDE Trainer 2007

Degrees

- BBA-Management (University of Texas-Brownsville)
- M.Ed. educational technology (University of Texas-Brownsville)
- E.Ed., instructional and educational technology (Texas Tech University)
