= Sofía Sisniega =

Mexican actress (born 1989)

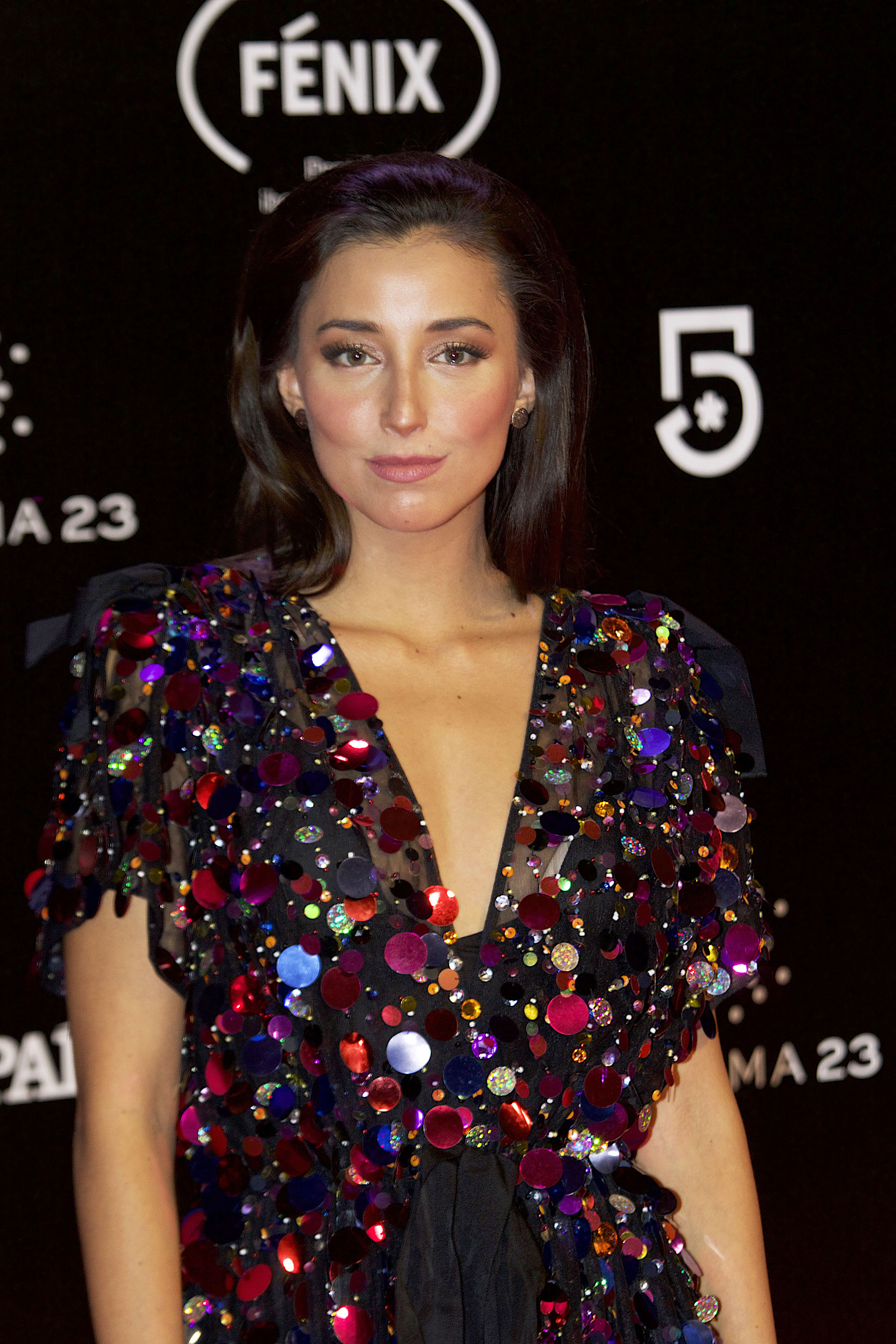
- Sisniega in 2018
- Born: Sofía Sisniega; 7 June 1989 (age 36); Cuernavaca, Morelos, Mexico
- Occupation: Actress
- Years active: 2006–present
- Father: Marcel Sisniega Campbell
- Relatives: Ivar Sisniega (uncle)

Sofía Sisniega Aspe (born 7 June 1989) is a Mexican actress, best known for her role as Sofia López-Haro in the 2013 Mexican adaptation, Gossip Girl: Acapulco.

== Early life ==
Sisniega was born in Cuernavaca, Mexico. She began acting in local community theatre productions aged four. She performed four times a week at bookstores as part of a children's theatre group in Mexico. Her late father was Marcel Sisniega Campbell, a Mexican Grandmaster chess player and independent film director. She has dual-citizenship in the United States and Mexico and was raised in both countries.

At 17, she was accepted in the Conservatory at the Stella Adler Studio of Acting in New York City. She studied for three years before graduating. She also took acting lessons at Casa Azul and Centro Universitario de Teatro (CUT) in Mexico City.

== Career ==
=== Beginnings ===
Sisniega began acting professionally at 15 and appeared in two films, Mujeres en el Acto and Arresto Domiciliario in 2006 and 2008 both by the acclaimed director, Gabriel Retes. Arresto Domiciliario was shot in Costa Rica. In 2007, she worked with her father in La Cadenita, an independent film he directed. In 2010, while studying in NYC, she participated in A través del silencio, also directed by her father. Since then she has appeared in film and television roles in both the U.S. and Mexico.

In 2011, she was cast as "Mariana" in the Mexican teen-oriented drama series, Bienvenida Realidad. For the role, she learned to play the guitar. The show was based on the original Chilean version of the same name. It explored topics including sexuality, drug abuse, and eating disorders. Sofia's character was bisexual. The series had one season with 120 episodes. It aired weeknights in Mexico and in the United States on MTV Tr3s.

=== 2013 - present ===
In January 2013, Sisniega was officially confirmed as "Sofía López-Haro" in the Mexican teen drama series, Gossip Girl: Acapulco. Previously, she appeared in a short demo pilot in 2012 for the show. The series was a Spanish-language adaption of Gossip Girl where Sisniega played the equivalent to "Serena van der Woodsen" in the series. The show was produced as an international collaboration between the Mexican production company El Mall and Warner Brothers International Television. Mexican producer Pedro Torres served as co-producer for the series. Filming for the show began in January 2013 and ended on May 5, 2013, in Acapulco, Mexico. The show first aired in Mexico as an exclusive to subscribers for Golden Premiere on August 5, 2013. It later aired in Mexico for Telehit in September 2013 and in the United States it was shown on Thursday nights on UniMás. Despite the show's huge success in Mexico and the U.S., it was officially cancelled on January 14, 2014, due to producers' disagreements. The show lasted for one season with 25 episodes.

In 2013, as part of the promotion of Gossip Girl Acapulco, she appeared in Jesse y Joy's music video for "Llorar" alongside her Gossip Girl: Acapulco costar, Jon Ecker. The video was filmed in Michoacán, Mexico.

In December 2013, Sisniega appeared in a print ad for PETA Latino's campaign, Real Beauty is Cruelty-Free.

In 2014 Sofia played the lead, opposite to Brian Petsos, in the highly acclaimed Mischa Rozema’s science fiction short "Sundays" which had at least three studios vying for it during 2015.

In late 2014, she filmed Insurgentes Malditos, a zombie-themed horror movie, in Mexico. The film is slated for release in 2016. In January 2015, Sisniega was cast on the first Spanish-language Netflix original TV series, Club de Cuervos. Due to the show's success, a second season was ordered, and filming is expected to resume sometime during 2016.

In 2019 Sofia appeared in an ad for PETA Latino that proclaimed " “I’d Rather Go Naked Than Wear Forever 21. Tell the Company to Drop Cruel Wool.” The ads were unveiled in a protest of Forever 21 in Mexico City. She also appeared in other ads that asked consumers to go vegan, use cruelty-free makeup, and personal care products.

== Personal life ==
Sisniega's late father was Marcel Sisniega Campbell, a Grandmaster chess player, writer, screenwriter and independent film director. He died on January 19, 2013, from a stroke. Her paternal uncle, Ivar Sisniega, is a modern pentathlete and politician who competed in the Summer Olympic Games in the 1980s.

Sisniega is an animal-rights activist and vegetarian. In her spare time, she rescues animals and assists with putting them up for adoption. She currently lives between Mexico City and Los Angeles. She speaks Spanish and English In August 2014, she founded, "Milk Bar", a bakery featuring organic, vegan and gluten-free cookies and desserts, located in Mexico City. In March 2015, she partnered with actresses, Zuria Vega and Marimar Vega, to expand the bakery, changing its name to "Milkella by Milk Bar".

== Filmography ==
=== Television ===
Year	Project	Role	Notes
2010	Los Minondo	Carmela	Series regular
2011	Bienvenida Realidad	Mariana	Lead
2013	Gossip Girl: Acapulco	Sofía López-Haro	Lead role
2013	Sr. Ávila	Luna	Recurring role
2015-2020	Club de Cuervos	Paty Villa	Recurring role
2016	Crossing the Rubicon: The Journey	Trinity Warner Medina	Television mini-series
2018	The House of Flowers	Mara	
2020	El Candidato	Unknown	

=== Film ===
Year	Film	Role	Notes
2022	Where Birds Go To Die		
2019	Locas por el cambio	Paula / Paulina	
2016	Mexiwood	Sofia Paleta	
2016	¿Qué culpa tiene el niño?	Laura	
2014	Sundays	Isabelle	Short film
2014	Panic 5 Bravo	Felicia	
2014	I Brake for Gringos	Stephanie 'Steph'	Filmed in 2012
2013	Elysium	Carlyle's Secretary	
2013	The Boy Who Smells Like Fish	Claudia	
2012	El Gringo	'Flaca'	
2012	Get the Gringo	20-Year-Old Bombshell	
2012	Flight of the Butterflies	Chloe	Documentary
2011	Letras pequeñas	María	Short film
2011	Bacalar	Karim	Produced by Disney in Mexico
2010	A través del silencio	Novia	Directed by Marcel Sisniega Campbell
2009	Iris' Struggle	Lead Role	Short film
2008	Wet by you	Lead Role	Short film
2008	Arresto domiciliario	Ana	Supporting role
2007	La cadenita	Estudiante	Directed by Marcel Sisniega Campbell
2006	Mujeres en el Acto	Unknown	

=== Music video ===
Year	Artist	Song	Notes
2013	Jesse y Joy	Llorar featuring Mario Domm	Female Lead

== See also ==
- List of people from Morelos
