= Mario Campos López =

Mexican chess player (born 1943)

Personal information
- Born: 15 May 1943 (age 83)

Chess career
- Country: Mexico
- Title: International Master (1975)
- Peak rating: 2390 (July 1973)

Mario Campos López (born 15 May 1943) is a Mexican chess player. He earned the title of International Master (IM, 1975) and won the Mexican Chess Championship twice, in 1973 and 1974.

== Chess career ==
From the begin of 1970s to the begin 1980s, Mario Campos López was one of Mexico's leading chess players. He twice won the Mexican Chess Championship: 1973 and 1974. In 1969 in Quito and Guayaquil Campos López participated in FIDE World Chess Championship Central American Zonal tournament and shared 4th-5th place. In 1975 in Santo Domingo he participated in FIDE World Chess Championship Caribbean-Central American Zonal tournament and shared 3rd-4th place.

Campos López played for Mexico in the Chess Olympiad:

- In 1972, at first board in the 20th Chess Olympiad in Skopje (+7, =6, -2),
- In 1974, at first board in the 21st Chess Olympiad in Nice (+4, =8, -4),
- In 1978, at second board in the 23rd Chess Olympiad in Buenos Aires (+4, =5, -4),
- In 1980, at second board in the 24th Chess Olympiad in La Valletta (+0, =4, -4),
- In 1982, at fourth board in the 25th Chess Olympiad in Lucerne (+2, =1, -4).
