= Lev Yankelevich =

German chess grandmaster (born 1997)

Personal information
- Born: October 28, 1997 (age 28) Kazan, Russia

Chess career
- Country: Germany
- Title: Grandmaster (2022)
- FIDE rating: 2451 (July 2026)
- Peak rating: 2496 (July 2022)

Lev Yankelevich is a German chess grandmaster.

== Chess career ==
In March 2019, he defeated Cuban national champion Carlos Daniel Albornoz Cabrera at the Accentus Young Masters, where he would later earn his first GM norm.

He was awarded the Grandmaster title in 2022, after achieving his norms at the:

- Accentus Young Masters in March 2019
- 6e Open International de Purtichju in July 2019
- Teplice Open in June 2022

In July 2023, he tied for second place with P. Iniyan in the Czech Open G1 Rapid, prevailing after tiebreak scores.
