= Saving Private Perez =

- Theatrical release poster
- Directed by: Beto Gómez
- Written by: Beto Gómez; Francisco Payó González
- Produced by: Alexis Fridman; Beto Gómez; Billy Rovzar; Walten Von Bortsel
- Starring: Miguel Rodarte; Jesus Ochoa; Joaquin Cosio; Gerardo Taracena; Rodrigo Oviedo; Jaime Camil; Marius Biegai; Adal Ramones
- Cinematography: Daniel Jacobs
- Edited by: Mario Sandoval
- Music by: Mark Mothersbaugh
- Production companies: Salamandra Films; Lemon Films; Terregal Films; Via Media
- Distributed by: Videocine
- Release date: September 2, 2011
- Running time: 105 minutes
- Country: Mexico
- Language: Spanish
- Budget: 50 million pesos (US$4.5 million)
- Box office: $9.3 million

Saving Private Perez is a 2011 Mexican Western comedy film directed by Beto Gómez. The plot follows a Mexican organized crime leader, who is asked by his mother to rescue his brother, a United States Marine Private fighting in Iraq. The mobster sets up a team of four hand-picked Mexican men for the mission: his best friend, a Native Indigenous tomato farmer; two older veterans and a convicted murderer who is rescued from prison.

== Cast ==
- Miguel Rodarte as Julián Pérez, a powerful Mexican drug kingpin and Juan Perez's older brother.
- Jesús Ochoa as José María 'Chema' Díaz, one of the two old veterans in the Juan Perez's rescue team.
- Joaquín Cosio as Rosalío 'Chalío' Mendoza, one of the two old veterans in the Juan Perez's rescue team.
- Rodrigo Oviedo as Juventino Rodríguez 'Pumita', a notorious and dangerous convicted murderer, Benito Garcia's sicario and one of the members of Juan Perez's rescue team.
- Gerardo Taracena as Carmelo Benavides, a Native Indigenous tomato farmer, Julian's best friend and one of the members of Juan Perez's rescue team.
- Marius Biegai as Sasha Boginski (Russian: Саша богинский, Sasha Boginskiy), a Russian druggie.
- Jaime Camil as Eladio, Julian's intelligent and wise right-hand.
- Adal Ramones as Benito García, a Mexican drug kingpin and Julian Perez's archenemy.
- Isela Vega as Doña Elvira de Pérez, the mother of Julian and Juan Perez.
- Juan Carlos Flores as Juan Pérez, a United States Army Private, Julian's younger brother and the main focus of the film.
- Veronica Falcón as Mujer iraquí
