= ¿Qué culpa tiene el niño? =

2016 film directed by Gustavo Loza

- Directed by: Gustavo Loza
- Cinematography: Carlos Hidalgo
- Edited by: Camilo Abadía
- Music by: Federico Bonasso
- Production companies: Adicta Films; Alebrije Cine y Video
- Release date: 13 May 2016 (Mexico)
- Running time: 105 minutes
- Country: Mexico
- Language: Spanish
- Budget: $1.8 Million
- Box office: $14.4 Million

¿Qué culpa tiene el niño? (lit. 'What fault does the kid have?'; transl. Don't Blame the Kid) is a 2016 Mexican comedy film directed by Gustavo Loza and distributed by Adicta Films. The film premiered on 13 May 2016, and stars Karla Souza, and Ricardo Abarca.

== Plot ==
María Eugenia “Maru” Lamacona de la Barquera (Karla Souza) wakes up alone in a hotel room in Acapulco, Guerrero, Mexico. Through a flashback, it is revealed that she was attending a wedding along with her best friends Daniela (Fabiola Guajardo), and Paulina (Rocio Garcia). There they meet Renato “La Rana” Zamarripa (Ricardo Abarca) and his best friend Abel "El Cadáver" Escobar (Biassini Segura). Heavy drinking and general mayhem ensue causing Maru and her friends to get blackout drunk.

Later Maru begins to experience morning sickness and takes a home pregnancy test, where she tests positive. Maru and her friends contact Laura (Sofia Sisniega), whose wedding they attended, which leads Maru back to El Cadaver and thus La Rana. Maru arrives at La Rana's apartment and advises him she is pregnant, much to his surprise. She informs him she has decided to terminate the pregnancy, to his chagrin. While at the clinic with Paulina, she has a change of heart, returns to Renato, and demands he help take care of the baby. He is ecstatic and immediately agrees. However, Maru makes it clear that it does not mean they will be a couple, as she has no romantic feelings for him, and they will only be coparenting. Renato wants to be romantically involved with Maru, and despite his feelings, reluctantly agrees. Maru takes Renato to meet her parents and reveals she is pregnant. Her parents disapprove and demand she return to her unfaithful boyfriend Juan Pablo (Erick Elias) while feigning that he is the father in order to maintain their social status and her father's (Jesus Ochoa) political position. Maru rebels and refuses to return with Juan Pablo. In turn, her parents force marriage on her in order to prevent a political scandal that could cost her father the current election.

Renato, in complete disagreement of just being married for the sake of appearances, tells Maru that he wishes to document their journey through film and video, Maru agrees. As they document the various stages of their relationship, Maru begins to develop feelings for Renato but is adamant about saving face, holds back, and vehemently and continually reminds Renato it is all for show. Renato and Maru go on honeymoon where he meets two women. Much to Maru's chagrin, she becomes jealous but stubbornly states she isn't. The morning before they leave back home, Maru initiates sex but later insists it was only a slip.

Six months later they find out they are having a boy. Maru has opened up to Renato while still keeping emotional space between them deliberately. On the evening of her baby shower, Maru argues with her father because of the way he treats Renato. Unbeknownst to anyone, Renato has refused a job offer from her father in exchange for his silence, as Renato inadvertently found out he is cheating on his wife. Maru and Renato spend the night together at his home. The next morning Renato reveals his video to her, she realizes she's been unnecessarily holding back her feelings for him, apologies for treating him badly, and declares she too is in love with him.

While at work, Renato receives a call from Maru informing him she is in labor. They rush to the hospital, where her parents and friends arrive in time to meet the baby. It is revealed that the baby is of oriental descent. Furthermore, Renato's initial surprise reaction to Maru's pregnancy was genuine. Maru's friends swipe through the wedding photos and find a Chinese man who they believe could be the true father. It is implied through flashbacks that Renato knew he was not the father but was in love with Maru all along. At her hospital bedside, Renato tells her he loves her and tells the baby he is his father. Her parents, realizing what he's done, embrace him with open arms. The film closes with Renato making a video for his son in anticipation of possible teasing/bullying him over the fact that he looks oriental but his parents do not.

In a mid-credits scene, we see Renato, Maru, their family and friends at Renato Jr.’s first birthday. El Cadaver and Paulina are now a couple and are expecting their first child. Renato’s mother Rosie and Plutarco are together, and Daniela is dating Laura’s, presumed, ex-husband.

== Cast ==
- Karla Souza as María Eugenia "Maru" Lamacona de la Barquera
- Ricardo Abarca as Renato “La Rana” Zamarripa
- Gerardo Taracena as Plutarco
- Sofía Sisniega as Laura
- Fabiola Guajardo as Daniela
- Rocio Garcia as Paulina
- Erick Elías as Juan Pablo
- Mara Escalante as Rosie Zamarripa, Renato's mother
- Jesús Ochoa as Diputado Lamacona, Maru's father
- Mar Carrera as Nina de la Barquera de Lamacona, Maru's mother
- Biassini Segura as Abel "El Cadáver" Escobar

== Reception ==
The film was received well in Mexico where its gross positioned it as one of the highest-grossing films in new Mexican cinema. Elsewhere, the film has garnered mixed reviews scoring 6.6 on IMDb, 5/10 stars on Film Affinity, and a 54% from both critics and audiences on Rotten Tomatoes.
