= Where Birds Go to Die =

Donde los pájaros van a morir
- Theatrical release poster
- Directed by: Analeine Cal y Mayor
- Written by: Analeine Cal y Mayor; Alfredo Mendoza
- Produced by: Analeine Cal y Mayor; Mónica Lozano; Dariela Ludlow; Eamon O'Farrill
- Starring: Flavio Medina; Sofía Sisniega
- Cinematography: Dariela Ludlow; Hector Maeshiro
- Edited by: Gilberto González Penilla
- Music by: Camilla Uboldi
- Production company: Chamaca Films
- Distributed by: Vix+
- Release dates: November 24, 2022 (limited); January 27, 2023 (Vix+)
- Running time: 101 minutes
- Country: Mexico
- Language: Spanish

Where Birds Go To Die (Spanish: Donde los pájaros van a morir) is a 2022 Mexican comedy-drama film directed by Analeine Cal y Mayor and written by Cal y Mayor & Alfredo Mendoza. Starring Flavio Medina and Sofía Sisniega.

== Synopsis ==
The miserable life of a 40-year-old lawyer will change drastically when he escapes from a birthday party and arrives in an eccentric paradise where he can finally be respected; however, sooner or later he will realize that neither outside nor inside he got any respect.

== Cast ==
The actors participating in this film are:

- Flavio Medina as Miguel
- Sofía Sisniega
- Alejandra Ambrosi
- Claudia Lobo
- Orlando Moguel as Roberto
- Harding Junior
- Enrique Arreola as Alebrije Manager
- Yuriria del Valle
- Steve Kisicki as Donald
- Mika Kubo

== Release ==
It had a limited release on November 24, 2022 in Mexican theaters in Mexico City, to then premiere on January 27, 2023 on Vix+.
