= Copenhagen (2014 film) =

- Directed by: Mark Raso
- Written by: Mark Raso
- Produced by: Mauro Mueller; Mette Thygesen
- Starring: Gethin Anthony; Frederikke Dahl Hansen; Sebastian Armesto; Olivia Grant; Mille Dinesen; Baard Owe; Tamzin Merchant
- Cinematography: Alan Poon
- Edited by: Mark Raso
- Music by: Agatha Kaspar
- Production companies: Fidelio Films; Scorched Films
- Release date: 2014
- Running time: 98 minutes
- Countries: United States; Canada; Denmark
- Languages: English, Danish

Copenhagen is an independent Canadian-American coming-of-age adventure film. It had its world premiere as the opening narrative feature at the 20th anniversary edition of the Slamdance Film Festival 2014. The film won the Grand Jury Prize at the Florida Film Festival and Gasparilla Film Festival.

== Synopsis ==
After weeks of travelling through Europe, the immature American William finds himself at a crossroads in Copenhagen. Copenhagen is not just another European city for William; it is also the city of his father, Daniel's birth. When Effy, working in William's hotel, befriends the 28-year-old William, they set off on an adventure to deliver a letter written by William's father to his father, after he was abandoned when he was eight years old. Along the way, they uncover William's family's sordid past thanks to Effy's persistence.

An attraction builds between William and Effy. They explore a museum where William caresses Effy's face and nearly kisses her before they are interrupted. Effy has been evasive about her age, but when pressed, makes the startling revelation that she is not a hotel employee, but is a 14-year-old doing her grammar school praktik (internship) at the hotel.

One night at a bar, William sees Effy being dragged out of the bar by an older man, who is later revealed to be Effy's mother's boyfriend. William manages to stop the man from dragging Effy away and beats him up, causing both him and Effy to flee the scene.

William sneaks Effy inside his hotel room. After talking with him briefly, Effy tells William that she loves him and asks him if he wants her. He replies yes, but expresses hesitancy because of her age. They start undressing and kiss, before William stops, covers the topless Effy with a sheet, and holds her close. In the next scene it is morning, and Effy awakes fully clothed. William is sitting atop the bedclothes; she is under them.

Effy translates Daniel's letter to his father for William. He thanks her, and they go their separate ways. Effy returns to her mother's apartment, where her mom's boyfriend tries to make up with her. Effy evades his touch and says she is going to tell her mother. William soon arrives at his grandfather's home and delivers his father's letter to the grandfather he had never known.

Back at school, Effy quietly looks at several pictures she had taken with William and smiles at one of her sleeping in the hotel room she had shared with William. At the same time, William stands at the symbolic Skagen, where the North Sea meets the Baltic.

== Cast ==
- Gethin Anthony – William
- Frederikke Dahl Hansen – Effy
- Sebastian Armesto – Jeremy
- Olivia Grant – Jennifer
- Baard Owe – Uncle Mads
- Mille Dinesen – Effy's mother
- Martin Hestbæk – Henrik
- Tamzin Merchant – Sandra
- Preben Ravn – Thomas Vinter
- Sebastian Bull Sarning - Albert
- Gordon Kennedy – Uncle Peter
- Sune Kofoed – receptionist Madsen
- Silja Eriksen Jensen – Signe
- Julie Christiansen – Berlin girl
- Asbjørn Krogh Nissen – Ivan
- Zaki Nobel Mehabil – bartender Markus
- Thomas Buttenschøn - Thomas Buttenschøn
- Miriam Yeager - school teacher
- Sune Kaarsberg - office secretary (voice)
- Kåre Fjalland - priest
- Jane Pejtersen - Dane on bridge
- Hélène Kuhn - Heather
- Mads Korsgaard - hostel bartender
- Lars-Bo Johansen - karaoke singer

== Production ==
The film was produced by Fidelio Films and Scorched Films. The film was shot in Copenhagen. It is the first feature film by Student Academy Award winner Mark Raso. The film was produced by Mauro Mueller and Mette Thygesen.

== Release ==
The film premièred in theaters on October 3, 2014, in the US and on December 5 in Canada.

== Reception ==
The film received positive reviews upon release. As of March 2021, 88% of the 16 reviews compiled by Rotten Tomatoes are positive, and have an average score of 7.1 out of 10.

New York Times film critic David DeWitt writes that Raso's "absorbing film has a delicate nuance that will linger after the popcorn's gone". Joe Leydon for Variety (magazine) writes that "To his credit, writer-director Raso provides an answer that is both emotionally and dramatically satisfying. Better still, he gets a pitch-perfect performance from Danish up-and-comer Hansen, who greatly impresses with her unaffected spontaneity, playing Effy as both precociously wise and tremulously vulnerable". The Hollywood Reporter called the film "an impressive feature debut".

== Awards ==
List of awards and nominations
Film Festival	Category	Nominee	Outcome
Florida Film Festival	Grand Jury Award for Best Narrative Feature	Copenhagen	Won
Gasparilla International Film Festival	Grand Jury Award for Best Feature Film	Copenhagen	Won
Gasparilla International Film Festival	Special Jury for Acting	Frederikke Dahl Hansen	Won
Milano International Film Festival	Leonardo's Horse Award for Best Supporting Actress	Frederikke Dahl Hansen	Nominated
Sedona International Film Festival	Director's Choice Award for Best Feature Film	Copenhagen	Won
Slamdance Film Festival	Audience Award for Best Narrative Feature	Copenhagen	Won
Slamdance Film Festival	Grand Jury Prize for Best Narrative Feature	Copenhagen	Nominated
Woods Hole Film Festival	Jury Prize for Best Narrative Feature Film	Copenhagen	Won
Destiny City Film Festival	Best Narrative Feature	Copenhagen	Won
