= Kenneth Frey Beckman =

Mexican chess player (born 1950)

Personal information
- Born: 25 February 1950 (age 76) Paris, France

Chess career
- Country: Mexico
- Title: International Master (1975); ICCF Grandmaster (2004)
- Peak rating: 2480 (January 1982)

Kenneth Frey Beckman (born 25 February 1950) is a Mexican chess International Master (IM, 1975) and International Correspondence Chess Grandmaster (2004), five-times Mexican Chess Championship winner (1980, 1981, 1983, 1984, 1986).

== Chess player career ==
Kenneth Frey Beckman learned to play chess at the age of 8 from his father. His international chess career spanned from 1967 to 1987. He twice won the Mexican Chess Championship: 1981, 1983, 1984, and 1986 (shared). In 1974 in Winnipeg Kenneth Frey Beckman participated in 8th Pan American Chess Championship and ranked in 10th place. He was winner of Caracas (1973) and Mexico City (1975) International Chess tournaments.

Kenneth Frey Beckman played for Mexico in the Chess Olympiad:

- In 1972, at second board in the 20th Chess Olympiad in Skopje (+6, =7, -6),
- In 1974, at second board in the 21st Chess Olympiad in Nice (+7, =3, -5),
- In 1980, at first board in the 24th Chess Olympiad in La Valletta (+7, =3, -2),
- In 1982, at first board in the 25th Chess Olympiad in Lucerne (+2, =6, -4),
- In 1986, at first board in the 27th Chess Olympiad in Dubai (+1, =2, -5),
- In 2002, at second reserve board in the 35th Chess Olympiad in Bled (+2, =1, -1).

In later years, Kenneth Frey Beckman active participated in correspondence chess tournaments. In 2004, he was awarded the International Correspondence Chess Grandmaster (GMC) title.
