= Luis Fernando Ibarra Chami =

Mexican chess grandmaster (born 1989)

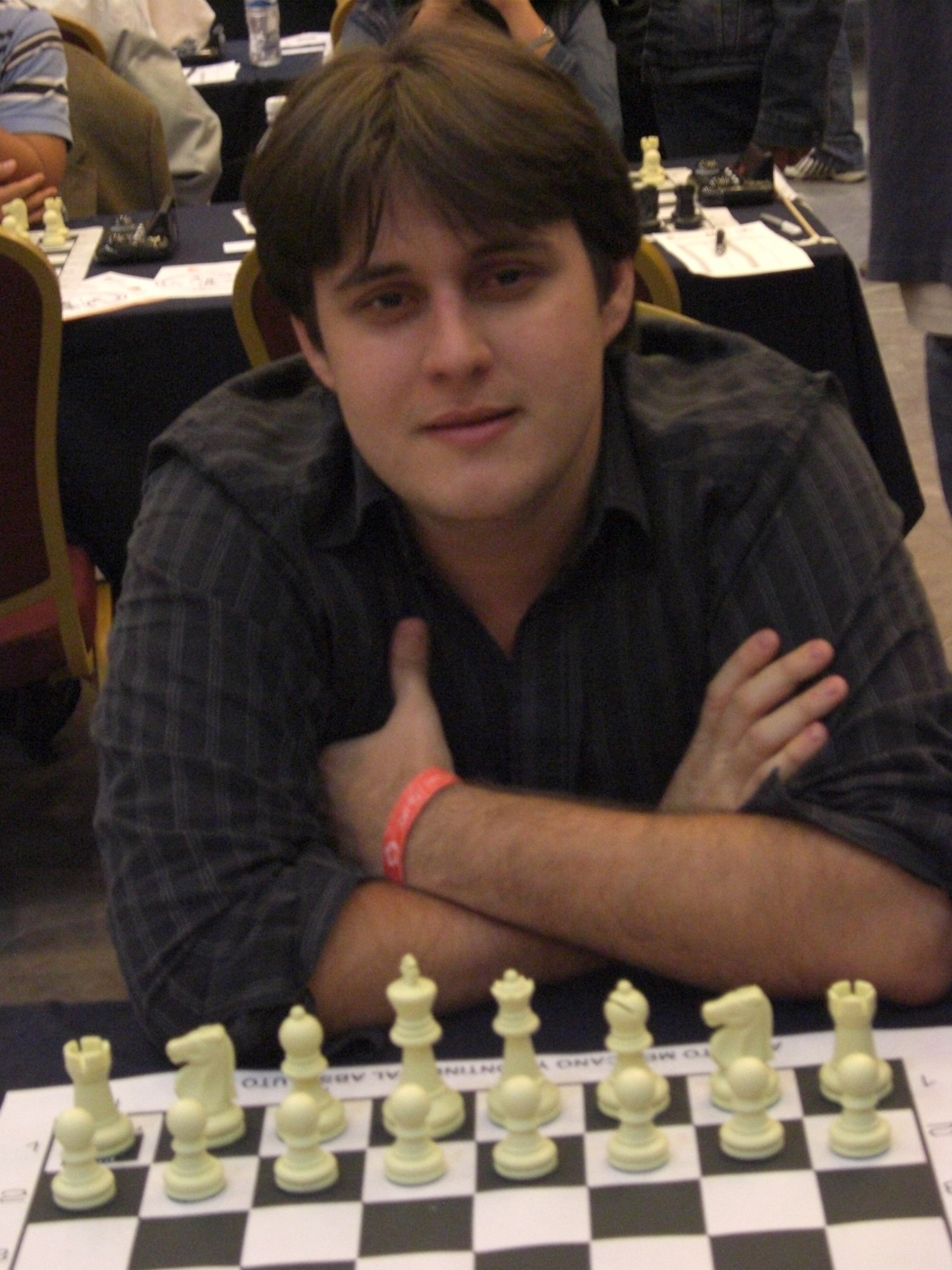
- Luis Fernando Ibarra Chami during the American Continental Chess Championship in Toluca (Mexico), April 2011

Personal information
- Born: May 15, 1989 (age 37) Mérida, Yucatán

Chess career
- Country: Mexico
- Title: Grandmaster (2020)
- FIDE rating: 2422 (July 2026)
- Peak rating: 2514 (May 2011)

Luis Fernando Ibarra Chami (born 1989) is a Mexican chess player. He was awarded the Grandmaster title by FIDE in 2020.

== Career ==
In 2009, Ibarra Chami finished second on a tiebreak in the 2009 Carlos Torre Repetto Memorial behind Carlos Daniel Albornoz Cabrera.

Ibarra Chami was awarded the Yucatán State Sport Prize in 2020.

He won a gold medal on board two in the rapid section of the 2023 Central American and Caribbean Games. and bronze in the blitz.

He qualified for the Chess World Cup 2023, where Abhimanyu Puranik defeated him in the first round.
