= Juan Carlos González Zamora =

Cuban-Mexican chess grandmaster (born 1968)

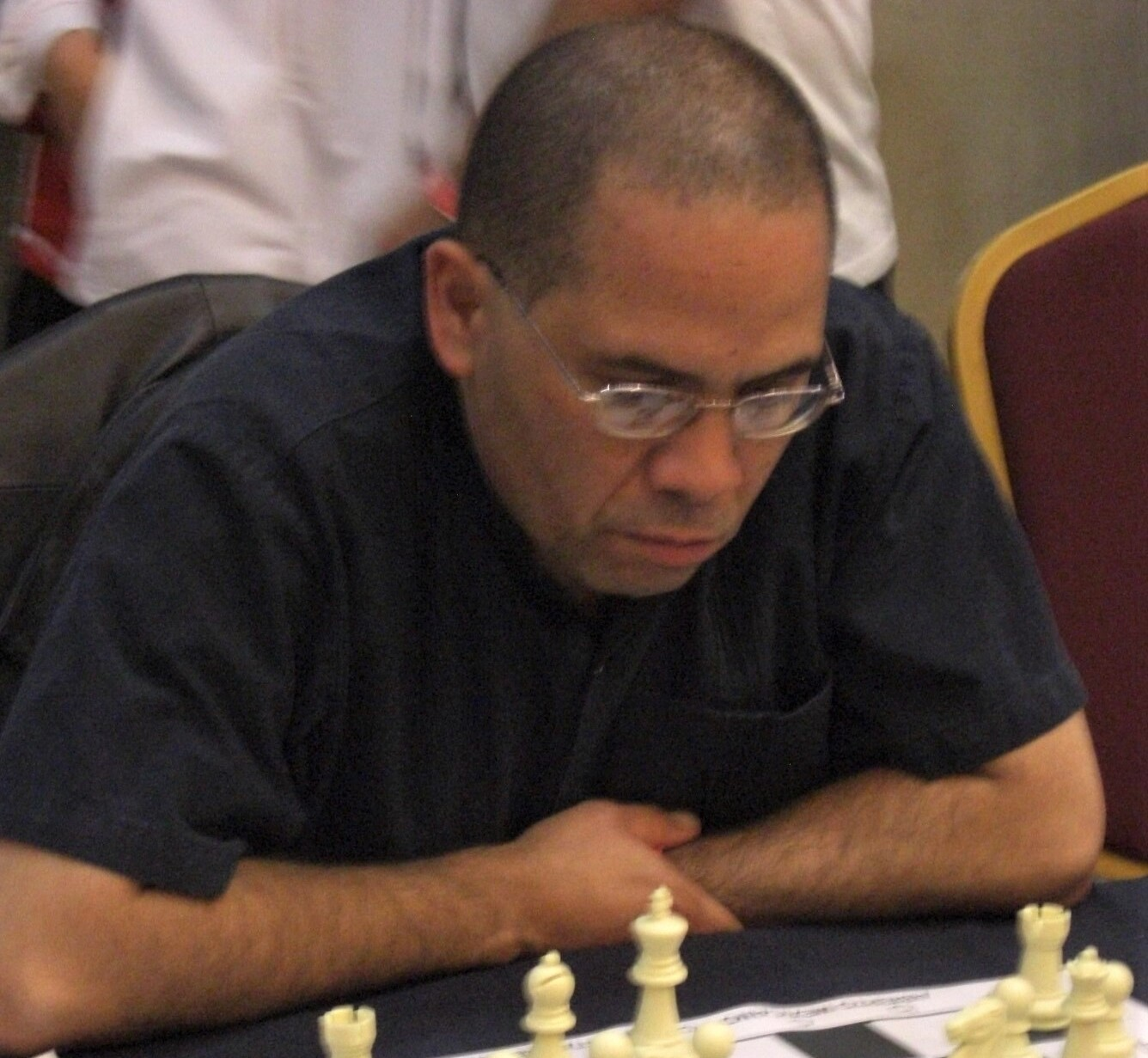
- Juan Carlos González Zamora, Toluca 2011

Personal information
- Born: June 24, 1968 (age 58) Havana, Cuba

Chess career
- Country: Cuba (until 2004); Mexico (since 2004)
- Title: Grandmaster (2004)
- FIDE rating: 2466 (July 2026)
- Peak rating: 2568 (October 2008)

Juan Carlos González Zamora (born June 24, 1968) is a Cuban-Mexican chess grandmaster. He is the fourth Mexican to be awarded the Grandmaster title by FIDE.

He has won many tournaments in Mexico and has participated in international tournaments. He is a nine-time Mexican chess champion.
