= Gerardo Taracena =

Mexican actor (1970–2026)

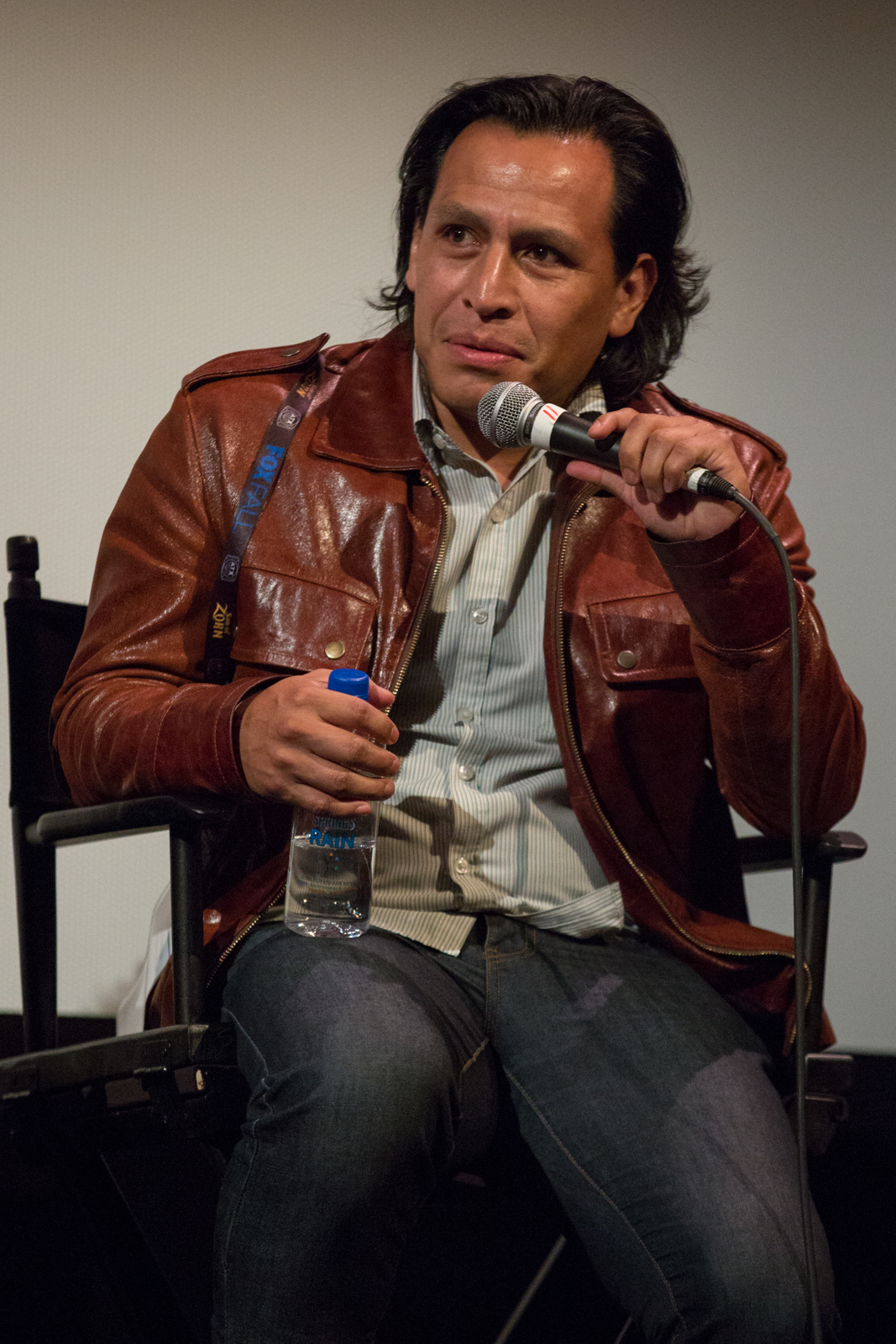
- Taracena in 2016
- Born: March 27, 1970; Mexico City, Mexico
- Died: January 31, 2026 (aged 55); México City, México
- Occupations: Actor; dancer
- Years active: 1994–2026
- Known for: Pablo Acosta in Narcos: Mexico

Gerardo Taracena (March 27, 1970 – January 31, 2026) was a Mexican actor and dancer. He is known for his roles in Apocalypto (2006), Man on Fire (2004), The Violin (2005), and Sin nombre (2009). He is also known for the Netflix series Narcos: Mexico.

== Early life ==
Gerardo Taracena was born on March 27, 1970 in Mexico City. He studied Dramatic arts in the University Center of Theater of the National Autonomous University of Mexico. In 1992 he acted in diverse festivals of theater and dance with the group of dance Integro of Peru, until 1996.

== Career ==
Taracena is known to have taken part in a diverse selection of festivals across the whole of Latin America, and has performed in more than 30 works of theatrical acts. Gerardo Taracena was also enrolled in the theatrical group Theater Myth. His production on film and TV has grown both in Mexico and the United States. He appeared in the Mexican film Saving Private Perez, released in 2011, with fellow Mexican actor Jaime Camil.

== Death ==
Taracena died on January 31, 2026, at the age of 55.

== Filmography ==
=== Film ===
Year	Title	Role
2001	The Mexican	Reveler to Fire Gun
2004	Man on Fire	Executive Adjutant
2005	The Violin	Genaro
2006	Apocalypto	Middle Eye
2009	Sin Nombre	Horacio
2009	Deseo	Marino
2009	La casa de las sanaciones	
2010	Sanguinarios Del M1	Junco
2011	Saving Private Perez	Carmelo Benavides
2012	A World for Raúl	Raúl's father
2016	¿Qué culpa tiene el niño?	Plutarco
2017	Dionisio Juglar	Dionisio
2018	Cafe Con Leche	Eduardo Manrique
2022	Sound of Freedom	El Alacrán
2022	Presencias	Don Jaime
2023	Surviving My Quinceañera	Melchor

=== Television roles ===
Year	Title	Role	Notes
2007–2008	El Pantera	El Mandril	Recurring role; 15 episodes
2008	Tiempo final	Pampa	Episode: "Dinero falso"
2009	Hermanos y detectives	Unknown role	Episode: "La única heredera"
2009	Los simuladores	Vicente	Recurring role; 7 episodes
2012	Capadocia	Cirilo	2 episodes
2014	El Mariachi	Silvio	Episode: "El crimen"
2015	Texas Rising	Manuel Flores	Recurring role; 5 episodes
2015	El Señor de los Cielos	El Chamán	Episode: "Ojo por ojo"
2016–2017	Perseguidos	Gustavo "Tavo" Benítez	Also starring; 30 episodes
2016–2017	Queen of the South	Cesar "Batman" Guemes	Also starring; 11 episodes
2018–2020	Narcos: Mexico	Pablo Acosta	Main role; 11 episodes
2018	Diablero	Benito Infante	
2022	Dale Gas	Abel	Recurring role; 9 episodes
