= Yerisbel Miranda Llanes =

Cuban chess player (born 1987)

Personal information
- Born: October 11, 1987 (age 39)

Chess career
- Country: Cuba
- Title: Woman Grandmaster (2022)
- Peak rating: 2347 (May 2022)

Yerisbel Miranda Llanes (born 1987) is a Cuban chess player and Woman International Master.

== Biography ==
In 2017, Yerisbel Miranda Llanes placed shared first with Danitza Vázquez and Maritza Arribas Robaina in the Women's World Chess Championship American Zone 2.3 tournament, which qualified her for the Women's World Chess Championship 2018 (November). In 2017, in Pinar del Río Yerisbel Miranda Llanes won Women's Cuban Chess Championship. In 2018, Yerisbel Miranda Llanes won silver medal after Deysi Cori in Women's Pan American Chess Championship.

Yerisbel Miranda Llanes played for Cuba in the Women's Chess Olympiads:

- In 2018, at reserve board in the 43rd Chess Olympiad (women) in Batumi (=7 =0 -1).

In 2011, she was awarded the FIDE Woman International Master (WIM) title.
