= Adrián Alonso =

Mexican actor

- Born: Adrián Alonso Barona; April 6, 1994 (age 31); Mexico City, Mexico
- Occupation: Actor
- Years active: 1997–present
- Children: 1

Adrián Alonso Barona (born April 6, 1994) is a Mexican actor. As a child actor, he was best known for the movie The Legend of Zorro.

== Life and career ==
In 2005, he played Zorro's son in the Columbia Pictures movie The Legend of Zorro, starring Antonio Banderas and Catherine Zeta-Jones.

In 2007, he participated in the One Long Night film tells of David Siqueiros, and fully bilingual film produced in Mexico. That same year, he was called by Patricia Riggen to co-star alongside Eugenio Derbez and Kate del Castillo in Under the Same Moon (La misma luna) in 2007. He also had a small role in Casi Divas of Issa Lopez, released in 2008.

Between 2013 and 2018, he held roles in two television series, HBO Latino's Sr. Ávila and Televisa's Como dice el dicho.

== Filmography ==
Film performances
| Year | Title | Role | Notes |
|---|---|---|---|
| 2004 | Voces inocentes | Chele | Film debut |
| 2004 | Al otro lado | Prisciliano Martínez | |
| 2005 | The Legend of Zorro | Joaquín de la Vega | |
| 2006 | I Love Miami | Tony | |
| 2007 | One Long Night | Young Richard | |
| 2007 | Breve cuento sobre la aparición espontánea de un árbol imaginario | Juan | Short film |
| 2007 | Under the Same Moon | Carlos Reyes "Carlitos" | |
| 2008 | Tiempo de partir | | Short film |
| 2008 | Casi divas | Patricks | |
| 2011 | La Leyenda del tesoro | Erick | |
| 2011 | Más allá del muro | | |
| 2012 | Cristiada | Lalo | |
| 2012 | A World for Raúl | Hernán | Short film |
| 2017 | El último aliento | Alejandro / Indian Bulllie | |

Television performances
| Year | Title | Role | Notes |
|---|---|---|---|
| 1997 | El secreto de Alejandra | Henrique | |
| 2003 | Ladrón de corazones | Niño | |
| 2003 | El alma herida | Child Daniel Granados | |
| 2004–06 | Mujer, casos de la vida real | Various roles | 7 episodes |
| 2005 | Pablo y Andrea | Martín Ibáñez | |
| 2006 | Línea nocturna | Niño | Episode: "El tesoro de Juan Chávez" |
| 2007 | XHDRbZ | Diego | "Carrera de perros" (Season 2, Episode 10) |
| 2009 | Los simuladores | Pablo | "El vengador infantil" (Season 2, Episode 6) |
| 2010, 2015 | La Rosa de Guadalupe | Edison/Aurelio | 2 episodes: "Ilusiones Rotas" "La última flor del asfalto" |
| 2011 | El sexo débil | Víctor Camacho | |
| 2015 | Film School Shorts | Hernán | "Playing with Power" (Season 3, Episode 7) |
| 2016 | Yago | Bruno Guerrero López | 56 episodes |
| 2016 | El Chema | Joaquín Venegas Joven | 3 episodes |
| 2017 | Su nombre era Dolores, la Jenn que yo conocí | Mikey | 15 episodes |
| 2013–18 | Sr. Ávila | Emiliano Ávila | 24 episodes |
| 2013-18 | Como dice el dicho | Ramón/Richard Jose | 5 episodes |
