= Lelys Stanley Martinez Duany =

Cuban chess grandmaster (born 1985)

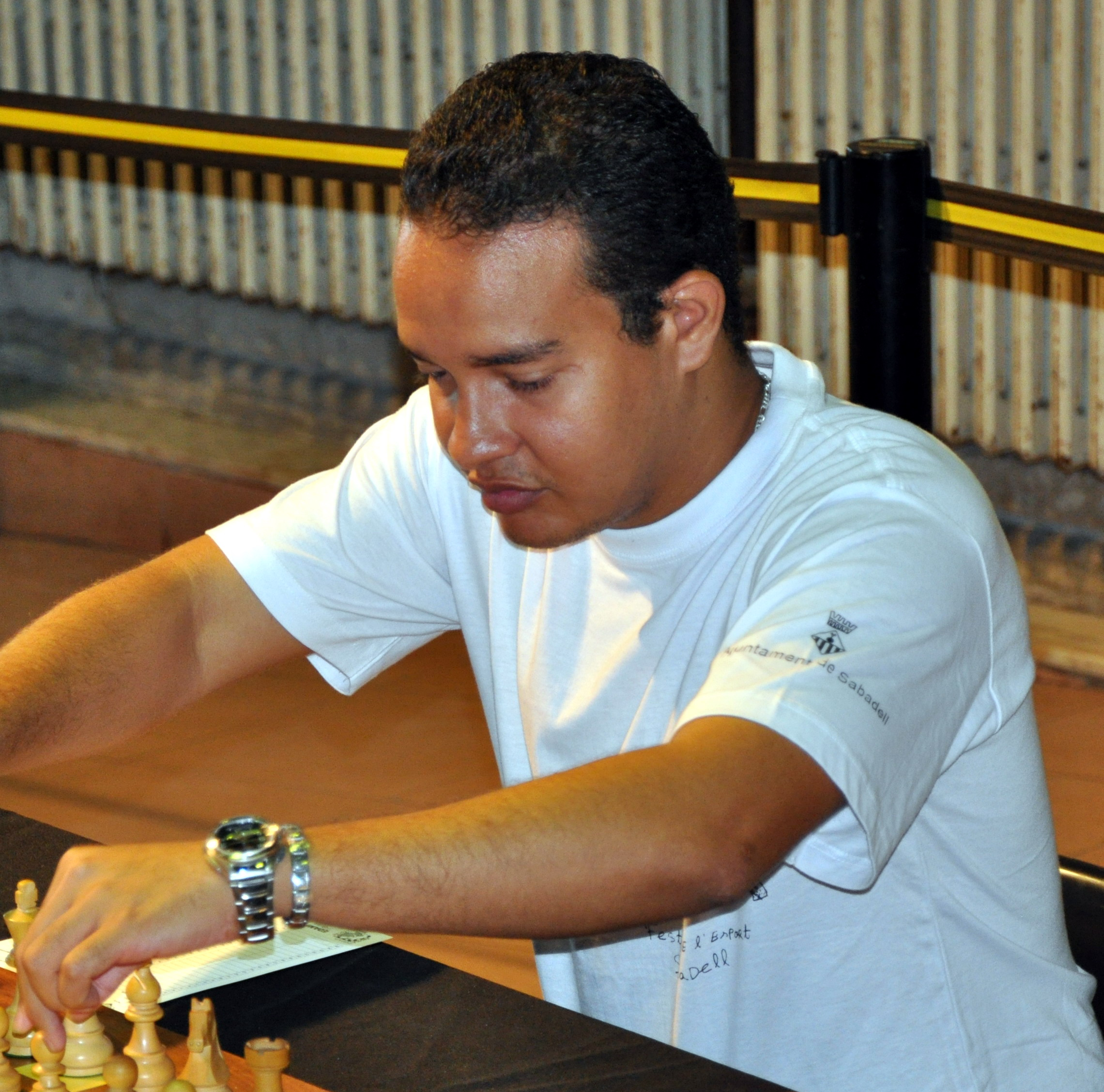
- Martinez Duany in 2010

Personal information
- Born: July 10, 1985 (age 41) Santiago de Cuba, Cuba

Chess career
- Country: Cuba
- Title: Grandmaster (2009)
- FIDE rating: 2440 (September 2026)
- Peak rating: 2547 (January 2019)

Lelys Stanley Martinez Duany is a Cuban chess grandmaster.

== Chess career ==
In August 2022, he tied for third place with four other players at the City of Famalicão Open. He was ranked in third place after tiebreaks.

In February 2023, he shared the lead going into the final round of the Cuban Chess Championship, but lost the championship to Elier Miranda Mesa after drawing against Dylan Isidro Berdayes Ason in the final round. However, Martinez finished the tournament undefeated.

In June 2024, he won the rapid portion of the Absolute Continental Chess Championship of the Americas.
