= Danitza Vázquez =

Puerto Rican chess player (born 2000)

Personal information
- Born: Danitza Fernanda Vázquez Maccarini; April 25, 2000 (age 26) Caguas, Puerto Rico

Chess career
- Country: Puerto Rico
- Title: FIDE Master (2018); Woman International Master (2013)
- Peak rating: 2295 (August 2018)

Danitza Fernanda Vázquez Maccarini (born April 25, 2000 in Caguas, Puerto Rico) is a Puerto Rican chess player. After winning the Central American and Caribbean U20 Girls Championship in El Salvador in 2013, she was awarded by FIDE the title Woman International Master (WIM), becoming the youngest one in the world at the time. In 2015, at 15, she became the youngest ever to win the chess championship of Puerto Rico; Vázquez finished first scoring 8/9 points, a full point ahead of the runner-up, International Master Alejandro Montalvo. She won the bronze medal in the Girls U18 division of the World Youth Chess Championships in 2017. In November of the same year, Vázquez won the Women's Zonal 2.3 Championship on tie-break from Maritza Arribas Robaina and Yerisbel Miranda Llanes. As a result, Vázquez qualified to play in the Women's World Chess Championship.

Danitza Vázquez has played for the Puerto Rican team in the Chess Olympiad and the Women's Chess Olympiad.
