= Super8 (musical group) =

super8 (sometimes referred to as super8cph) was a film and music group formed in Copenhagen in 1999. Not to be confused with Super8 & Tab.

== Overgang ==
The group's first release was the 2001 album titled Overgang. It was a collaboration with several nonmusicians who were issued a two-track mix and instructed to return it with alterations.

01. Abstrakte Værdier
02. Hvor Tilfældigt er Tilfældigt w/Danny Lund
03. Handler om at Komme
04. Kbh (FTS mix)
05. Betahelvede w/Valo
06. Hun tager altid noget med Sig (Vasadisko mix) w/Solbjørk Áslaug
07. Efter Krigen
08. Retromaskinen w/Jes Brinch
09. Bag ryggen
10. Lorelei (Rienzi mix)
11. Civil Ulydighed
12. Temaet fra Sidste Kommando w/Lasse Schmidt
13. Filtre af Mislyd (Edit Cut/Up 1)
14. Fra betagelse til Besættelse (CELP/Gas mix)
15. Dansk Fjernsyn
16. Mekano w/Morten "Kaptajnen" Vammen
17. Fortid (70'erne)
18. Om Fejlbetjening w/Brant Tilds

== The Sound of Misanthropy ==
The second release by super8 was the 2003 five-track minialbum The Sound of Misanthropy - a commentary to the level of misogynist material on the web. With the exception of the fifth track which consists of private recordings The Sound of Misanthropy is composed exclusively of samples pirated off the internet. Therefore it was released solely on the web as a free download on the group's now defunct Myspace page.

The material is considered by super8 to be copyright-free.

1. Broken Beats Spoken Words
2. Amateur Justice
3. Hatero Sexual (Ohm mix)
4. Snowsister Babygum
5. Charlust

== dream2go ==
The 2007 album dream2go became the third and final release by super8 before disbanding later that year.

1. Narcotick
2. Monster of Reality
3. Killy Killy Killy
4. An Image Within
5. Secretia
6. Inside Air w/Solbjørk Áslaug
7. We Think We Sleep w/Line & Stitc
8. Without Tears
9. Shameless
10. Wobble
11. No Shared Pain

== Compilations ==
In 2005 super8 contributed with the track Certainstantial to the Jhonn Balance tribute Full Cold Moon available at www.darkwinter.com/
