= Marcel Sisniega Campbell =

Mexican chess grandmaster and film director (1959–2013

Personal information
- Born: July 28, 1959 Chicago, Illinois, United States
- Died: January 19, 2013 (aged 53) Coatepec, Veracruz, Mexico
- Children: 4, including Sofía Sisniega
- Relative: Ivar Sisniega (brother)

Chess career
- Country: Mexico
- Title: Grandmaster (1992)
- Peak rating: 2540 (July 1991)

Marcel Sisniega Campbell (July 28, 1959 – January 19, 2013) was a Mexican chess Grandmaster and film director.

== Biography ==
Sisniega was born in Chicago, United States, but grew up in Cuernavaca, Mexico. He earned the International Master title in 1978 and the Grandmaster title in 1992. Sisniega was a nine-time Mexican champion and three-time Carlos Torre Repetto Memorial winner. During his chess career he beat Viswanathan Anand, Artur Yusupov, Miguel Illescas and Jesús Nogueiras amongst others. He largely stopped playing after the early 1990s.

He was also a film writer and director. He is most recognized for his work in creating Libre de Culpas in 1997.

== Personal life and death ==
His brother is modern pentathlete and politician Ivar Sisniega, and his daughter is Mexican-American actress Sofía Sisniega.

Sisniega died suddenly of a heart attack on January 19, 2013, in Coatepec, Veracruz.

== See also ==
- List of people from Morelos
