= Simple8 =

British theatre company

- Formation: 2004
- Type: Theatre group
- Purpose: Ensemble theatre
- Location: London
- Website: www.simple8.co.uk

Simple8 is a London-based theatre company formed in 2004 by professional actors, writers and directors. They aim to produce innovative ensemble theatre that is ecologically sustainable.

== Productions and reception ==
In 2006, Simple8 staged an adaptation of Les Enfants du Paradis. The Times gave it five stars and said that it was "A superb production and a new (newish) company possessing the skills, intelligence and dedication to create such a wonder". It was adapted by company members Dudley Hinton and Sebastian Armesto (Armesto also directed).

In 2008, Simple8 presented The Living Unknown Soldier about a soldier left an amnesiac at the end of the Great War. It was based on the book by historian Jean-Yves Le Naour.

In 2011 the company adapted William Hogarth's engravings The Four Stages of Cruelty in collaboration with the playwright Adam Brace.

In 2013 Simple8 staged productions of The Cabinet of Dr. Caligari and Moby-Dick. In a review of The Cabinet of Dr. Caligari for The Evening Standard, critic Fiona Montford wrote that "What Simple8 are most decidedly not doing is slavishly recreating the work onstage but rather spinning an increasingly Kafka-esque yarn that has a low-fi yet chilled atmosphere...The eight-strong cast throw themselves into writer/director Sebastian Armesto and Dudley Hinton's surreally-tinged nightmare with gusto, doubling roles, playing instruments and at one cherishable moment forming themselves into the inner mechanisms of a large municipal clock."

In 2016 the company adapted Don't Sleep There Are Snakes by Dan Everett at the Park Theatre in London. Their 2018 production of E. M. Forster's novel A Passage to India was well received by critics.

== Sustainability ==
Produced by Strawberry Vale, Simple8's The Living Unknown Soldier was the first show at the Arcola Theatre in London to be powered by the venue's hydrogen fuel cell. Peak power consumption for lighting was said to be 4.5 kW, or "up to 60 percent less than comparable lighting installations". The set for their 2013 production of Moby Dick was built out of reclaimed materials.

== Awards ==
Simple8 received the 2013 Offie for Best Ensemble - Moby Dick and The Cabinet of Dr Caligari. That same year the company also won the Peter Brook/Equity Ensemble Award.
