= Carlos Daniel Albornoz Cabrera =

Cuban chess grandmaster (born 2000)

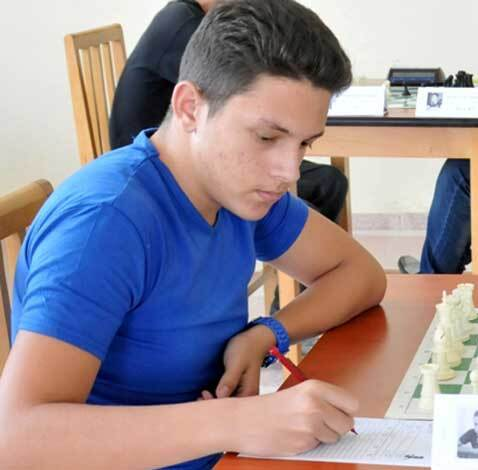

Personal information
- Born: December 26, 2000 (age 25) Camagüey, Cuba

Chess career
- Country: Cuba
- Title: Grandmaster (2019)
- FIDE rating: 2592 (July 2026)
- Peak rating: 2614 (June 2024)

Carlos Daniel Albornoz Cabrera (born 26 December 2000) is a Cuban chess player. He was awarded the title of Grandmaster (GM) by FIDE in 2019. As of August 2023, he is ranked third in Cuba.

== Career ==
In 2018, he won the 30th Carlos Torre Memorial, finishing with 7/9 points and beating Lelys Stanley Martinez Duany, Yuri González Vidal, and Evgeny Shtembuliak on tie-break. In 2019, he won the 31st Carlos Torre Repetto Memorial, again scoring 7/9 points and beating on tie-break Luis Fernando Ibarra Chami, Elier Miranda Mesa, and Bartłomiej Macieja. In 2022, he won the Zonal 2.3 tournament in San Pedro de Macorís with a score of 7.5/9.

He played in the Chess World Cup 2019, where he was defeated by Peter Svidler in the first round. He has also played in the Chess World Cup 2021, losing to Vojtěch Plát in the first round, and the Chess World Cup 2023, where he defeated Alisher Suleymenov in the first round but lost to Bassem Amin in the second round.
