= Awake (2021 film) =

2021 American science fiction thriller film by Mark Raso

- Official release poster
- Directed by: Mark Raso
- Screenplay by: Mark Raso; Joseph Raso
- Story by: Gregory Poirier
- Produced by: Paul Schiff
- Starring: Gina Rodriguez; Jennifer Jason Leigh; Barry Pepper; Finn Jones; Shamier Anderson; Ariana Greenblatt; Lucius Hoyos; Frances Fisher; Elias Edraki; Gil Bellows
- Cinematography: Alan Poon
- Edited by: Michele Conroy
- Music by: Antonio Pinto
- Production companies: Entertainment One; Paul Schiff Productions
- Distributed by: Netflix
- Release date: June 9, 2021
- Running time: 96 minutes
- Country: United States
- Language: English

Awake is a 2021 American apocalyptic science fiction thriller film, directed by Mark Raso, from a screenplay he wrote alongside Joseph Raso. It stars Gina Rodriguez, Jennifer Jason Leigh, Barry Pepper, Finn Jones, Shamier Anderson, Ariana Greenblatt, Frances Fisher, Elias Edraki, Lucius Hoyos and Gil Bellows. Rodriguez plays Jill (Rodriguez) who discovers her daughter (Greenblatt) may be immune to a disorder causing mass chronic sleep deprivation and attempts to bring her daughter to a laboratory to help develop a cure.

The film was released by Netflix on June 9, 2021, and received generally negative reviews from film critics who criticized the derivative plot and lack of tension. However, it reached number one worldwide on the platform when it was released.

== Plot ==
Former U.S. Army medic and recovering addict, Jill Adams, works as a security guard at a local college where she steals drugs from the research lab to sell. She has two children, Noah and Matilda.

While driving, their car loses power and is hit by another car, sending it into a lake. Matilda drowns but is revived by a police officer who reveals that everything that uses electricity is malfunctioning. At the hospital, they learn that coma patients have awoken. At home, the family is unable to sleep. On her way to work, Jill observes that the whole neighborhood is awake. Psychiatrist Dr. Murphy explains that people appear to be no longer able to fall asleep and they will soon suffer from sleep deprivation. The only known exception is an old woman who is being studied at a military base called The Hub, in hopes of finding a cure.

Jill remembers that Matilda appeared to be asleep that morning, and fears that she may be dead. She finds Matilda at church, where the churchgoers want to sacrifice her. After an officer opens fire, the ensuing chaos allows Jill to flee with her kids. Noah tells a reluctant Jill that they should bring Matilda to The Hub.

En route to The Hub, an escaped prisoner steals their car with Matilda in it. Jill and Noah are saved from the other hostile prisoners by the thief of their car, Dodge. Upon reaching The Hub, Jill has Dodge leave and enters The Hub alone. She finds the other woman who can sleep in ill condition. Murphy explains that there is no cure and lab workers have been using a drug that helps the brain function to keep them going. However, it is only temporary and causes neurological damage. The army confronts the family and Matilda tearfully admits that she can sleep.

Doctors decide to find what makes Matilda special. Matilda sees an ape in the lab that doesn't fall asleep when given anesthetic gas. The doctor reveals that chimps are the only animals besides humans that can't sleep due to their biological closeness to humans. They test the gas on Matilda and she falls asleep. Jill is handcuffed in a room where she experiences delirium.

Murphy explains to Jill that the sleep disorder was caused by the same solar flare that knocked out power, affecting humans' brains. Dodge is taken as a guard and given stimulants. The woman who can sleep goes into cardiac arrest and dies. Noah is taken away for experiments. As the soldiers start to go insane and kill each other, Jill rescues Matilda with the help of one of the doctors. Noah, hallucinating, electrocutes himself. Jill and Matilda try resuscitating him but suffer a mild electric shock from improperly using the defibrillator.

The next morning, Matilda notices that Noah was successfully revived and he awakens, saying that he was dreaming. As Jill is exhausted and dying, Matilda realizes the reason that she and Noah could sleep was because they had both temporarily died. They then drown Jill in a lake and attempt to resuscitate her. She awakens just as the camera cuts to the credits.

== Cast ==
- Gina Rodriguez as Jill
- Ariana Greenblatt as Matilda
- Frances Fisher as Doris
- Shamier Anderson as Dodge
- Finn Jones as Brian
- Lucius Hoyos as Noah
- Gil Bellows as Dr. Katz
- Barry Pepper as Pastor
- Jennifer Jason Leigh as Dr. Murphy

== Production ==
In May 2019, it was announced Gina Rodriguez had joined the cast of the film, with Mark Raso directing from a screenplay by himself and Joseph Raso and with Netflix distributing. In August 2019, Jennifer Jason Leigh, Barry Pepper, Finn Jones, Shamier Anderson, Ariana Greenblatt, Frances Fisher, Lucius Hoyos and Gil Bellows joined the cast of the film.

Principal photography began in August 2019.

== Reception ==
On the review aggregator website Rotten Tomatoes, 24% of 51 critics' reviews are positive, with an average rating of 4.4/10. The website's consensus reads: "A scattered and shallow disaster flick, Awake will have audiences reaching for the snooze button." Metacritic, which uses a weighted average, assigned the film a score of 35 out of 100, based on 13 critics, indicating "generally unfavorable" reviews.

Nick Allen at The Playlist called it "abysmal" gave the film a "D". He wrote that the movie "proves it has no idea how to present its one original idea with visual thrills, and it foolishly underestimates how performance is key to horror like this."
