= Elier Miranda Mesa =

Cuban chess grandmaster (born 1993)

Personal information
- Born: January 29, 1993 (age 33) Santa Clara, Cuba

Chess career
- Country: Cuba
- Title: Grandmaster (2019)
- FIDE rating: 2450 (July 2026)
- Peak rating: 2520 (October 2024)

Elier Miranda Mesa is a Cuban chess grandmaster.

== Chess career ==
In February 2023, he won the Cuban Chess Championship by defeating Omar Almeida Quintana in the final round.

In April 2024, he won the Mi Veracruz National Chess Championship by defeating Diasmany Otero in the final round.

In June 2024, he won the Orjan Lindroth Chess Memorial, remaining undefeated throughout the tournament.

In September 2024, he played for Cuba at the 45th Chess Olympiad.
