= Sebastian Armesto =

British actor (born 1982)

- Born: Sebastian File Xavier Fernández-Garcia Armesto; 3 June 1982 (age 44); England
- Education: Eton College
- Occupation: Actor
- Years active: 1994–present

Sebastian Felipe Xavier Fernández-Garcia Armesto (born 3 June 1982) is an English film, television and theatre actor. He is the son of historian Felipe Fernández-Armesto.

== Career ==
=== Television and film ===
Armesto played Charles V, Holy Roman Emperor in the series The Tudors. He starred in the 2008 ITV drama series The Palace as the King's carefree younger brother Prince George. He then played the character of Edmund Sparkler in the 2008 BBC version of Charles Dickens' novel Little Dorrit. In the 2011 film Pirates of the Caribbean: On Stranger Tides Armesto played the Spanish King Ferdinand VI. He played the poet and playwright Ben Jonson in Roland Emmerich's film Anonymous. In 2015 he played Lieutenant Dopheld Mitaka in Star Wars: The Force Awakens. He also played Tankard in the Poldark series in 2016 (seven episodes).

Armesto has also been in two stories of the British sci-fi series Doctor Who ("Bad Wolf/The Parting of the Ways", 2005) and Comte Louis de Provence in Marie Antoinette.

In March 2019, Armesto joined Cursed, a Netflix original television series based on a reimaging of the Arthurian legend, in the role of Uther Pendragon. The first season was released on 17 July 2020.

=== Theatre ===
Armesto has acted in theatre productions in Britain, including three shows at the National Theatre and one at the Royal Court. He also writes and directs theatre with company Simple 8. His productions include directing and adapting Les Enfants du Paradis. He co-wrote and directed a play based on William Hogarth's The Four Stages of Cruelty and new versions of The Cabinet of Dr. Caligari and Moby-Dick.

== Filmography ==
Key
†	Denotes works that have not yet been released

=== Film ===
Year	Title	Role	Notes
1994	A Feast at Midnight	Oberoi	
2004	Hawking	Robert Silkin	Television film
2006	Marie Antoinette	Louis Stanislas, Count of Provence	
2006	Dear Steven Spielberg	Lawyer 6	Short film
2007	Blood Monkey	Josh Dawson	Direct-to-video
2008	We Call Her Daisy	Daniel	Short film
2008	Loser's Anonymous	Edward	Direct-to-video
2009	Bright Star	Mr. Haslam	
2011	Pirates of the Caribbean: On Stranger Tides	King Ferdinand	
2011	Anonymous	Ben Jonson	
2013	Complicit	Gareth	Television film
2013	Dead Cat	Michael	
2013	Alpha: Omega	Lilith	Short film
2014	Copenhagen	Jeremy	
2014	He Took His Skin Off for Me	Him	Short film
2015	Coalition	George Osborne	Television film
2015	Star Wars: The Force Awakens	Lieutenant Mitaka	
2016	For Grace	The Filmmaker	
2017	Tulip Fever	Eduart Asmus	
2017	The Mercy	Nelson Messina	
2018	The Dead Ones	Jono	Short film
2018	Brothers of Italy	Major Stuart	Short film
2021	Free Fall	Freddie	Short film
TBA	† Savage House	Hans	Post-production
2026	† The Man with the Plan	Charles Dickens	

=== Television ===
Year	Title	Role	Notes
1995	The Famous Five	Cecil Dearlove	Episode: "Five Go Off to Camp"
2005	The Bill	Tim Salcedo	Episode: "Abuse in Kind"
2005	Doctor Who	Broff	Episode: "Bad Wolf"
2005	The Virgin Queen	Charles Blount	Miniseries; 2 episodes
2006	The Impressionists	Art Critic / Young Man in Exhibition	Miniseries; 2 episodes
2006	Ancient Rome: The Rise and Fall of an Empire	Honorius	Episode: "The Fall of Rome"
2007	The Tudors	Charles V	Episode: "Wolsey, Wolsey, Wolsey!"
2008	The Palace	Prince George	Series regular; 8 episodes
2008	Little Dorrit	Edmund Sparkler	Series regular; 12 episodes
2011	Zen	Silvio Miletti	Episode: "Ratking"
2012	Parade's End	Ruggles	Miniseries; 2 episodes
2015	Toast of London	Daz Klondyke	Episode: "Global Warming"
2016	Murder	Dominic Cotterall	Episode: "Lost Weekend"
2016	New Blood	Louis Wesley	Episode: "Case 2"
2016	Poldark	Tankard	Recurring role; 7 episodes
2016	Close to the Enemy	Alex Lombard	Series regular; 7 episodes
2017	Apple Tree Yard	Laurence	Episode: "Episode 3"
2017	Broadchurch	Clive Lucas	Series regular; 8 episodes
2018	The Terror	Charles Des Voeux	Series regular; 9 episodes
2018	Harlots	Justice Josiah Hunt	Series regular; 8 episodes
2019	Silent Witness	DI Neil Taramelli	Episode: "To Brighton, To Brighton"
2019	Gold Digger	Patrick	Miniseries; 6 episodes
2020	Cursed	Uther Pendragon	Series regular; 9 episodes
2023	A Small Light	Max Stoppelman	Miniseries; 4 episodes
2026	Kill Jackie	TBA	
