= Gethin Anthony =

English actor

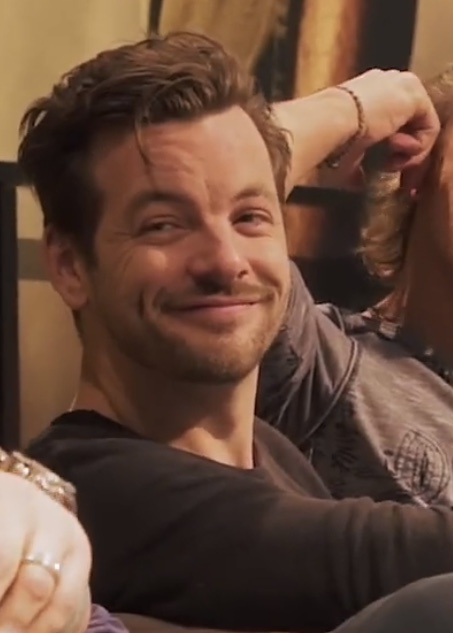
- Anthony at the 2019 German Comic Con Dortmund
- Born: 9 October 1983 (age 42); Stratford-upon-Avon, England
- Education: Balliol College, Oxford; LAMDA
- Occupation: Actor
- Years active: 2006–present

Gethin David L. Anthony (born 9 October 1983) is an English television and film actor best known for his role as Renly Baratheon for the first two seasons of Game of Thrones.

== Early life and education ==
Anthony was born in Stratford-upon-Avon, Warwickshire.

He attended Ashton Hayes Primary School in Ashton Hayes, Cheshire, Christ Church Primary School in New Malden, and the Tiffin School in Kingston-Upon-Thames. He received a scholarship for a summer programme at the British American Drama Academy in London from July to August 2004.

Anthony went on to study English Literature at Oxford University's Balliol College, appeared in numerous student productions (notably in the title role of Cyrano de Bergerac at the Oxford Playhouse), and was President of the Oxford University Dramatic Society, before training at London Academy of Music and Dramatic Art.

== Career ==
Anthony played Grigory in Boris Godunov at the Royal Shakespeare Company in Stratford-upon-Avon from November 2012 to March 2013.

He had guest roles in the series Ten Days to War and Doctors, and played William in the 2014 film Copenhagen. His most notable roles are Renly Baratheon in the HBO series Game of Thrones and Charles Manson in the NBC series Aquarius. In 2017, he voiced the character of Gil Brodie in the video game Mass Effect: Andromeda, and appeared in a play A Lie of the Mind at Southwark Playhouse in London with Robert Lonsdale and Kate Fahy. He also starred in Call the Midwife in 2014, in the role of George Saint.

== Filmography ==
Key
†	Denotes projects that have not yet been released

=== Film ===
Year	Film	Role	Notes	Ref.
2006	Pinochet in Suburbia	William Straw	Television film	
2008	Beyond the Rave	Noddy		
2009	Into the Storm	First Officer		
2014	Copenhagen	William		
2014	Alt	Danny	Television film	
2014	We Are Monster	Maurice Travis		
2017	Solace	Man	Short film	
2017	First Kill	Levi Barrett		
2017	Kodachrome	Jasper		
2017	Hi-Lo Joe	Alex		
2018	Dead in a Week or Your Money Back	Charlie		
2018	Vita & Virginia	Clive Bell		
2018	Firestorm	Sam Scott	Television film	
2018	The Fell	Joel	Short film	
2018	O Christmas Tree	Craig	Short film	
2018	Tahiti	Marcus	Short film	
2019	Welcome to the Powder Keg	Tommy	Short film	
2019	Around the Sun	Bernard		
2019	Angel Hunter	Tyro	Short film	
2020	Rival	Angel	Short film	
2020	Freedom of the People	William Walwyn	Short film	
2020	Knuckledust	Jeremiah		
2020	Limbo	Tom Murphy	Short film	
2023	Flite	Johnny	Short film	
2023	Midnight Caller	Jack Ratoran		
2023	His Cousin Herschel	Jerry	Short film	
2024	Water	Adam	Short film	

=== Television ===
Year	Show	Role	Notes	Ref.
2006	Holby City	Drew Kramer	Episode: "Yesterday Once More"	
2007	Gina's Laughing Gear	Leo	Episode: "Lil Sisters"	
2007	Doctors	Dave Jones	Episode: "A Sting in the Tail"	
2008	10 Days to War	Minister's Aid	Episode: "These Things are Always Chaos"	
2011–2012	Game of Thrones	Renly Baratheon	Recurring role; 8 episodes (seasons 1–2)	
2014	Call the Midwife	George Saint	Episode: "Series 3, Episode 7"	
2015–2016	Aquarius	Charles Manson	Series regular; 30 episodes	
2019	The Magicians	Enyalius	Recurring role; 2 episodes	
2020	Manhunt	FBI Agent Jack Brennan	Series regular; 10 episodes	
2025	Grace	Marcus O'Sullivan	Episode: "Need You Dead"	

=== Video games ===
Year	Game	Voice role	Notes
2012	Need for Speed: Most Wanted		
2013	Cloud Chamber	Max	
2014	Dragon Age: Inquisition	Imshael/Ser Morris/Red Templar	
2016	Quantum Break	Jack Joyce Prototype #2	
2017	Mass Effect: Andromeda	Gil Brodie	
2019	Anthem	Freelancer Diggs/Lancer Hawking	

== Stage ==
- Theatre 503/Latitude's Carrot as Alex
- Theatre Royal Northampton's In Praise of Love as Joey
- High Tide/Old Vic Tunnels's Ditch as James
- Birmingham Rep Theatre's Cling to Me Like Ivy as Patrick
- Hampstead Theatre's What Fatima Did as George
- The Old Red Lion's Fairytaleheart as Gideon.
- Tristan Bates Theatre's Death of Cool as Richie
- Old Vic's 24 Hour Plays
- Old Fire Station Theatre's Some Voices as Ray
- Oxford Playhouse's Cyrano de Bergerac as Cyrano
- Swan Theatre, Stratford-upon-Avon's Boris Godunov as Grigoriy Otrepyev, later Dmitriy, the Pretender

== Audio ==
- BBC Radio 4's Small Acts of Kindness as Charlie
- BBC Radio 4's Severed Threads as Jones
- Radio Static's The Minister of Chance as Sutu
- BBC's Legsy Gets a Break as John
- Big Finish Productions's The Year of Martha Jones as Mr Strand
- Gaslit by RR Haywood https://www.rrhaywood.com/other-books
