= José González García =

Spanish chess grandmaster (born 1973)

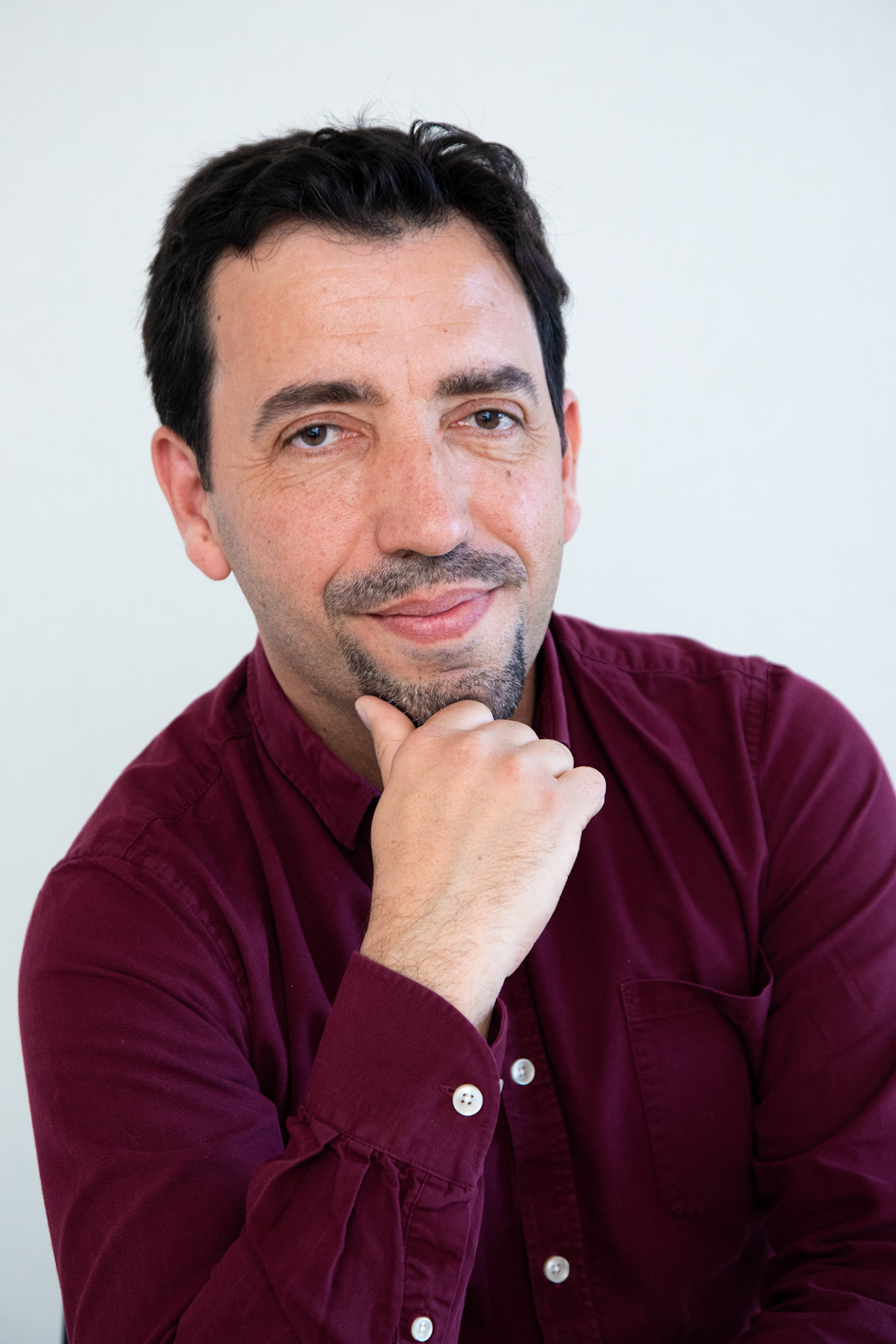
- González García in 2008

Personal information
- Born: August 12, 1973 (age 52) Madrid, Spain

Chess career
- Country: Mexico (until 2018); Spain (since 2018)
- Title: Grandmaster (2006)
- FIDE rating: 2426 (July 2026)
- Peak rating: 2548 (January 2008)

José González García (born August 12, 1973) is a Spanish-Mexican chess grandmaster, trainer, and writer. He earned the title of Grandmaster in 2005, becoming the fourth Mexican player to achieve this distinction. González García has represented Mexico in eight Chess Olympiads, seven times as a player and once as a coach. In recent years, he has also gained recognition as a content creator and online educator, producing instructional chess material and video courses for players of various levels.

== Early life and career ==
González García began playing competitive chess at the relatively late age of 14. Initially mentored in Mexico by Marcel Sisniega Campbell, he later moved to Budapest, Hungary, in 1995 at the age of 21 to pursue chess professionally. There, he trained under several renowned Hungarian coaches, including Péter Lukács and Tibor Károlyi, and competed intensively in local and international tournaments. That same year, he was awarded the title of International Master, and in 1996, he won the Absolute Mexican Chess Championship.

After four years in Hungary, González García returned to Mexico in 1999 and began focusing on chess education. He joined a chess school for talented players in the Yucatán Peninsula, marking the start of a successful coaching career. Among his most notable students are Manuel León Hoyos and Daniel Alsina Leal, both of whom went on to become Grandmasters.

== Return to competition ==
After several years dedicated primarily to coaching, González García returned to competitive chess in the early 2000s. In 2003, he won the Capablanca Memorial tournament, one of the most prestigious events in Latin America. The following year, he represented Mexico at the 36th Chess Olympiad in Calvià, Spain, where he earned a bronze medal on board three.

He achieved his final Grandmaster norm in 2005, officially receiving the title and becoming the fourth Mexican player to do so.

== Coaching and later activities ==
In 2004, González García moved back to Europe and settled in Barcelona, Spain. The following year, he was appointed director of Barcelona's Chess Training Centre, where he played a key role in the development of several promising Spanish players. He has remained active as a coach, regularly collaborating with the Catalan Chess Federation, particularly in the training and preparation of junior players for national competitions.

In addition to his coaching work, González García has developed a strong presence as a chess educator and content creator. He is the author of Opening Repertoire: The English Defence (Everyman Chess, 2020) and has produced multiple video courses for Chessable, as well as opening repertoires for Modern Chess. He also runs a YouTube channel where he publishes instructional content for players of various levels.

From 2016 to 2019, he was a regular contributor to Peón de Rey, one of the leading Spanish-language chess magazines, where he published articles on a wide range of topics including opening theory, classical games, and training methods.
