= Gilberto Hernández Guerrero =

Mexican chess grandmaster (born 1970)

Gilberto Hernández
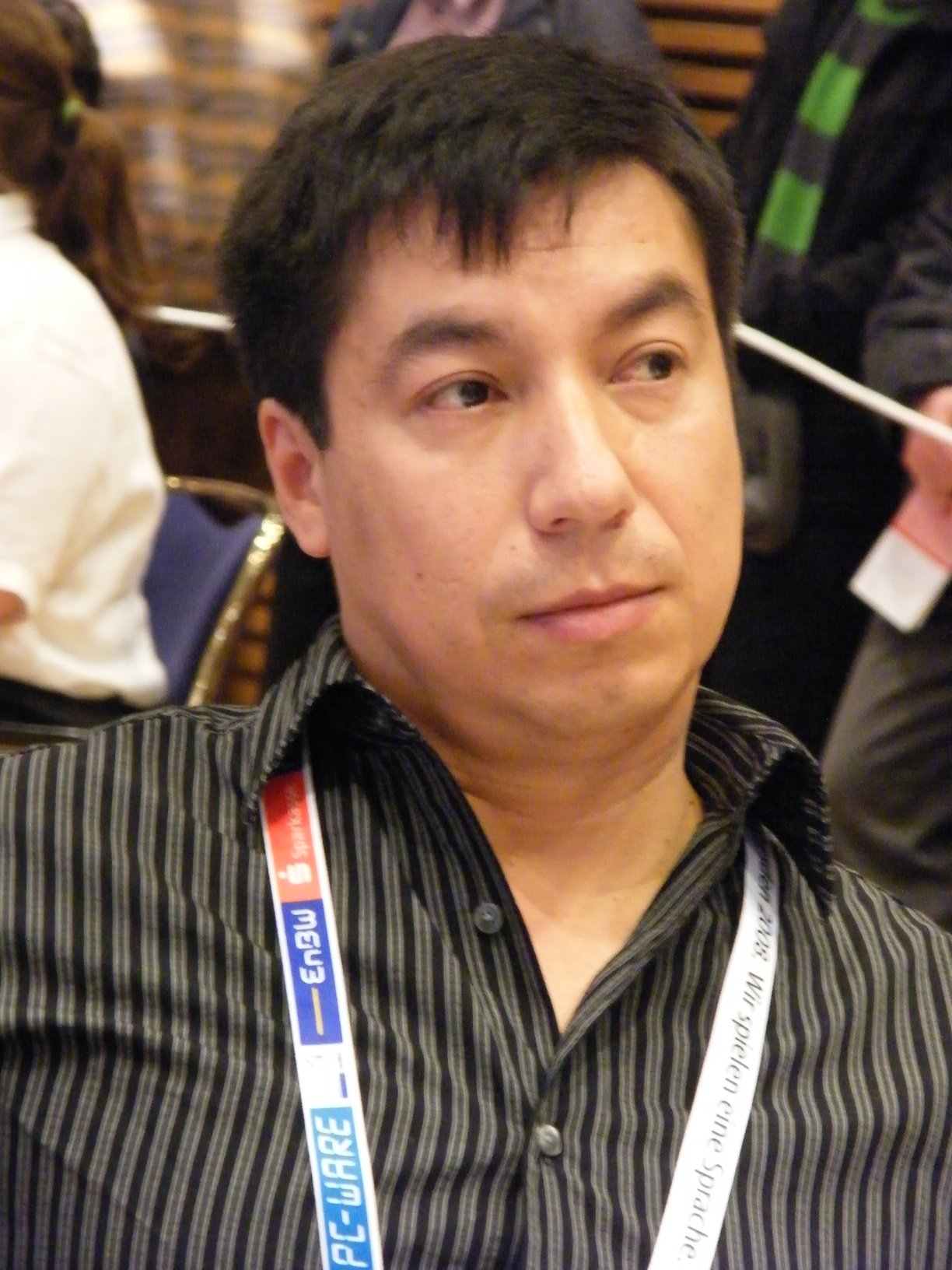
- Gilberto Hernández, Dresden 2008

Personal information
- Born: Gilberto Eduardo Hernández Guerrero; February 4, 1970 (age 56) San Luis Potosí, Mexico
- Spouse: Claudia Amura (m. 1997)

Chess career
- Country: Mexico
- Title: Grandmaster (1995)
- Peak rating: 2572 (July 2000)

Gilberto Hernández Guerrero (born February 4, 1970, in Ébano, San Luis Potosí) is a Mexican chess grandmaster. On the July 2008 FIDE rating list he has an Elo rating of 2550, making him the second highest ranked player on the Mexican ELO-list. He was the highest ranked Mexican player in most of the 1990s and 2000s.

== Biography ==
At age 5, Hernández learned the basics of chess. At age 8, he played his first tournament. As an 11-year-old he became champion of San Luis Potosí, his state, and also took the bronze medal in the World Under 12 Championship held in Xalapa, Veracruz. Despite not having a trainer, he became National Master at 14 and FIDE Master at 16 after winning the gold medal at the Pan-American Under-16 Championship in Puerto Rico.

As a 17-year-old he participated in a Zonal tournament held in Cuba, where he got his first International Master norm. After that success he received invitations to play in five more tournaments, so he stayed on the island for three months, which helped him to develop further. He also returned to Cuba at the age of 19 to attempt his last IM norm. He got it with a gap of 1.5 points. By that time, he already had a rating of 2520.

In 1990, Hernández played in the Open tournament in Lyon, France. He scored 8 out of 9 points beating well-known grandmasters like former World Junior Champion Vladimir Akopian and Artashes Minasian to become champion of the tournament. He continued to maintain a rating above 2500, and he received the Grandmaster title in 1995.

Gilberto Hernández has played 7 Olympiads and with more than 10 years living out of his country, he has won more than 40 international tournaments.

His most important results against elite chess players include his triumphs over Alexei Shirov, Vladimir Akopian, Boris Gulko, Tony Miles and Alexander Rustemov and his draws with Alexander Khalifman, Viktor Korchnoi, Judit Polgár, Boris Gelfand, Joël Lautier, Jeroen Piket, among others.

He is married to Claudia Amura, a Woman Grandmaster from Argentina.
