= Vienna North West (National Council electoral district) =

Parliamentary electoral district in Austria

- Wien Nord-West
- Electoral District for the National Council
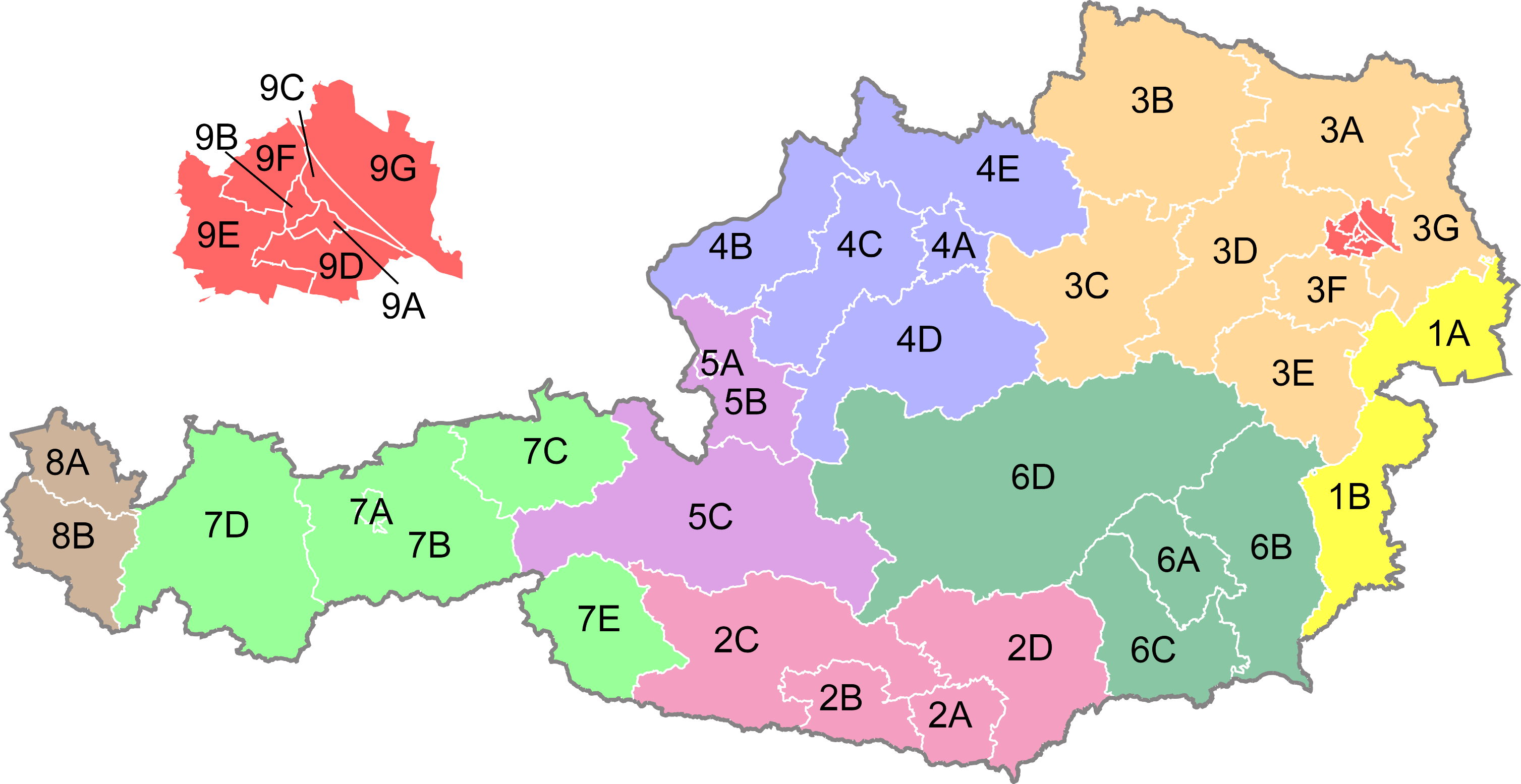
- The 39 regional electotral districts
- District: List: Döbling; Hernals; Ottakring; Währing
- State: Vienna
- Population: 286,236 (2024)
- Electorate: 170,992 (2019)
- Area: 51 km^{2} (2023)

Current Electoral District
- Created: 1994
- Seats: List: 5 (2002–present); 6 (1994–2002)
- Members: List: Lukas Hammer (GRÜNE); Andreas Ottenschläger (ÖVP); Christian Oxonitsch (SPÖ)
- Created from: Vienna

Vienna North West (German: Wien Nord-West), also known as Electoral District 9F (German: Wahlkreis 9F), is one of the 39 multi-member regional electoral districts of the National Council, the lower house of the Austrian Parliament, the national legislature of Austria. The electoral district was created in 1992 when electoral regulations were amended to add regional electoral districts to the existing state-wide electoral districts and came into being at the following legislative election in 1994. It consists of the districts of Döbling, Hernals, Ottakring and Währing in the city-state of Vienna. The electoral district currently elects five of the 183 members of the National Council using the open party-list proportional representation electoral system. At the 2019 legislative election the constituency had 170,992 registered electors.

== History ==
Vienna North West was one 43 regional electoral districts (regionalwahlkreise) established by the "National Council Electoral Regulations 1992" (Nationalrats-Wahlordnung 1992) passed by the National Council in 1992. It consisted of the districts of Döbling, Hernals, Ottakring and Währing in the city-state of Vienna. The district was initially allocated six seats in May 1993. Electoral regulations require the allocation of seats amongst the electoral districts to be recalculated following each national census and in September 2002 the number of seats allocated to Vienna North West was reduced to five based on the population as at the 2001 national census.

== Electoral system ==
Vienna North West currently elects five of the 183 members of the National Council using the open party-list proportional representation electoral system. The allocation of seats is carried out in three stages. In the first stage, seats are allocated to parties (lists) at the regional level using a state-wide Hare quota (wahlzahl) (valid votes in the state divided by the number of seats in the state). In the second stage, seats are allocated to parties at the state/provincial level using the state-wide Hare quota (any seats won by the party at the regional stage are subtracted from the party's state seats). In the third and final stage, seats are allocated to parties at the federal/national level using the D'Hondt method (any seats won by the party at the regional and state stages are subtracted from the party's federal seats). Only parties that reach the 4% national threshold, or have won a seat at the regional stage, compete for seats at the state and federal stages.

Electors may cast one preferential vote for individual candidates at the regional, state and federal levels. Split-ticket voting (panachage), or voting for more than one candidate at each level, is not permitted and will result in the ballot paper being invalidated. At the regional level, candidates must receive preferential votes amounting to at least 14% of the valid votes cast for their party to over-ride the order of the party list (10% and 7% respectively for the state and federal levels). Prior to April 2013 electors could not cast preferential votes at the federal level and the thresholds candidates needed to over-ride the party list order were higher at the regional level (half the Hare quota or 1/6 of the party votes) and state level (Hare quota).

== Election results ==
=== Summary ===
Election	Communists KPÖ+ / KPÖ			Social Democrats SPÖ			Greens GRÜNE			NEOS NEOS / LiF			People's ÖVP			Freedom FPÖ		
Election	Votes	%	Seats	Votes	%	Seats	Votes	%	Seats	Votes	%	Seats	Votes	%	Seats	Votes	%	Seats
2019	1,008	0.79%	0	29,006	22.83%	1	30,650	24.12%	1	15,297	12.04%	0	33,561	26.41%	1	12,396	9.76%	0
2017	2,080	1.56%	0	42,286	31.74%	1	9,929	7.45%	0	10,930	8.20%	0	34,031	25.54%	1	21,453	16.10%	0
2013	2,075	1.70%	0	32,116	26.27%	1	23,237	19.01%	0	12,133	9.92%	0	23,512	19.23%	0	19,908	16.28%	0
2008	1,322	1.02%	0	38,800	29.79%	1	24,155	18.55%	0	6,347	4.87%	0	29,583	22.71%	1	21,586	16.57%	0
2006	1,434	1.13%	0	44,267	34.97%	1	25,490	20.13%	1				35,067	27.70%	1	14,984	11.84%	0
2002	652	0.49%	0	50,024	37.54%	1	22,234	16.69%	0	1,468	1.10%	0	47,746	35.83%	1	10,303	7.73%	0
1999	929	0.73%	0	41,502	32.78%	1	14,159	11.18%	0	9,901	7.82%	0	27,776	21.94%	1	29,551	23.34%	1
1995	434	0.31%	0	53,735	38.51%	2	8,933	6.40%	0	12,955	9.28%	0	34,874	24.99%	1	26,898	19.27%	1
1994	453	0.34%	0	44,578	33.43%	1	13,911	10.43%	0	14,603	10.95%	0	28,388	21.29%	1	29,643	22.23%	1

=== Detailed ===
==== 2010s ====
===== 2019 =====
Results of the 2019 legislative election held on 29 September 2019:

Party		Votes per district					Total votes	%	Seats
Party		Döb- ling	Her- nals	Otta- kring	Wäh- ring	Voting card	Total votes	%	Seats
Austrian People's Party	ÖVP	11,874	5,647	8,485	6,803	752	33,561	26.41%	1
The Greens – The Green Alternative	GRÜNE	6,459	6,295	9,700	7,433	763	30,650	24.12%	1
Social Democratic Party of Austria	SPÖ	7,461	5,452	11,298	4,376	419	29,006	22.83%	1
NEOS – The New Austria	NEOS	5,179	2,700	3,192	3,857	369	15,297	12.04%	0
Freedom Party of Austria	FPÖ	3,482	2,315	4,487	1,885	227	12,396	9.76%	0
JETZT	JETZT	1,036	769	1,182	787	106	3,880	3.05%	0
KPÖ Plus	KPÖ+	214	191	416	164	23	1,008	0.79%	0
Der Wandel	WANDL	154	156	244	135	20	709	0.56%	0
The Beer Party	BIER	146	89	210	90	12	547	0.43%	0
Valid Votes		36,005	23,614	39,214	25,530	2,691	127,054	100.00%	3
Rejected Votes		237	165	328	140	13	883	0.69%	
Total Polled		36,242	23,779	39,542	25,670	2,704	127,937	74.82%	
Registered Electors		48,508	32,524	57,151	32,809		170,992		
Turnout		74.71%	73.11%	69.19%	78.24%		74.82%		

The following candidates were elected:

- Party mandates - Lukas Hammer (GRÜNE), 2,421 votes; Andreas Ottenschläger (ÖVP), 1,457 votes; and Nurten Yılmaz (SPÖ), 2,354 votes.

Nurten Yılmaz (SPÖ) resigned on 14 December 2022 and was replaced by Christian Oxonitsch (SPÖ) on 15 December 2022.

===== 2017 =====
Results of the 2017 legislative election held on 15 October 2017:

Party		Votes per district					Total votes	%	Seats
Party		Döb- ling	Her- nals	Otta- kring	Wäh- ring	Voting card	Total votes	%	Seats
Social Democratic Party of Austria	SPÖ	10,526	8,145	15,456	7,351	808	42,286	31.74%	1
Austrian People's Party	ÖVP	12,181	5,743	7,727	7,640	740	34,031	25.54%	1
Freedom Party of Austria	FPÖ	5,690	4,116	8,240	3,057	350	21,453	16.10%	0
NEOS – The New Austria	NEOS	3,401	1,936	2,413	2,826	354	10,930	8.20%	0
Peter Pilz List	PILZ	2,670	2,149	3,398	2,359	291	10,867	8.16%	0
The Greens – The Green Alternative	GRÜNE	1,907	2,067	3,125	2,553	277	9,929	7.45%	0
Communist Party of Austria	KPÖ	321	453	840	417	49	2,080	1.56%	0
My Vote Counts!	GILT	288	190	386	219	19	1,102	0.83%	0
The Whites	WEIßE	44	20	45	30	1	140	0.11%	0
Free List Austria	FLÖ	34	22	49	16	2	123	0.09%	0
Homeless in Politics	ODP	34	17	47	19	0	117	0.09%	0
EU Exit Party	EUAUS	26	11	41	9	1	88	0.07%	0
Socialist Left Party	SLP	17	15	38	15	1	86	0.06%	0
Valid Votes		37,139	24,884	41,805	26,511	2,893	133,232	100.00%	2
Rejected Votes		223	169	340	160	13	905	0.67%	
Total Polled		37,362	25,053	42,145	26,671	2,906	134,137	77.73%	
Registered Electors		48,358	33,195	58,159	32,858		172,570		
Turnout		77.26%	75.47%	72.47%	81.17%		77.73%		

The following candidates were elected:

- Party mandates - Andreas Ottenschläger (ÖVP), 1,847 votes; and Nurten Yılmaz (SPÖ), 3,093 votes.

===== 2013 =====
Results of the 2013 legislative election held on 29 September 2013:

Party		Votes per district					Total votes	%	Seats
Party		Döb- ling	Her- nals	Otta- kring	Wäh- ring	Voting card	Total votes	%	Seats
Social Democratic Party of Austria	SPÖ	8,728	5,820	12,478	4,573	517	32,116	26.27%	1
Austrian People's Party	ÖVP	8,663	3,821	4,848	5,593	587	23,512	19.23%	0
The Greens – The Green Alternative	GRÜNE	5,120	4,732	7,213	5,497	675	23,237	19.01%	0
Freedom Party of Austria	FPÖ	5,287	3,855	7,741	2,682	343	19,908	16.28%	0
NEOS – The New Austria	NEOS	4,192	2,086	2,539	3,035	281	12,133	9.92%	0
Team Stronach	FRANK	1,437	837	1,387	780	90	4,531	3.71%	0
Alliance for the Future of Austria	BZÖ	904	636	880	548	81	3,049	2.49%	0
Communist Party of Austria	KPÖ	409	438	801	376	51	2,075	1.70%	0
Pirate Party of Austria	PIRAT	319	242	443	235	22	1,261	1.03%	0
Der Wandel	WANDL	61	83	94	51	4	293	0.24%	0
Socialist Left Party	SLP	29	23	66	23	1	142	0.12%	0
Valid Votes		35,149	22,573	38,490	23,393	2,652	122,257	100.00%	1
Rejected Votes		458	312	553	307	30	1,660	1.34%	
Total Polled		35,607	22,885	39,043	23,700	2,682	123,917	71.12%	
Registered Electors		49,213	33,512	59,053	32,469		174,247		
Turnout		72.35%	68.29%	66.12%	72.99%		71.12%		

The following candidates were elected:

- Party mandates - Nurten Yılmaz (SPÖ), 2,128 votes.

==== 2000s ====
===== 2008 =====
Results of the 2008 legislative election held on 28 September 2008:

Party		Votes per district					Total votes	%	Seats
Party		Döb- ling	Her- nals	Otta- kring	Wäh- ring	Voting card	Total votes	%	Seats
Social Democratic Party of Austria	SPÖ	10,029	6,869	14,867	5,247	1,788	38,800	29.79%	1
Austrian People's Party	ÖVP	10,903	4,571	5,421	6,977	1,711	29,583	22.71%	1
The Greens – The Green Alternative	GRÜNE	5,850	4,709	6,726	5,651	1,219	24,155	18.55%	0
Freedom Party of Austria	FPÖ	5,346	4,110	8,275	2,894	961	21,586	16.57%	0
Liberal Forum	LiF	1,946	1,093	1,553	1,435	320	6,347	4.87%	0
Alliance for the Future of Austria	BZÖ	1,746	1,081	1,665	920	302	5,714	4.39%	0
Communist Party of Austria	KPÖ	275	249	484	253	61	1,322	1.02%	0
Fritz Dinkhauser List – Citizens' Forum Tyrol	FRITZ	273	182	280	206	66	1,007	0.77%	0
Independent Citizens' Initiative Save Austria	RETTÖ	218	152	223	123	47	763	0.59%	0
The Christians	DC	148	86	95	124	17	470	0.36%	0
Animal Rights Party	TRP	108	59	87	63	21	338	0.26%	0
Left	LINKE	43	36	43	25	6	153	0.12%	0
Valid Votes		36,885	23,197	39,719	23,918	6,519	130,238	100.00%	2
Rejected Votes		499	333	570	340	92	1,834	1.39%	
Total Polled		37,384	23,530	40,289	24,258	6,611	132,072	74.65%	
Registered Electors		50,559	33,842	59,355	33,159		176,915		
Turnout		73.94%	69.53%	67.88%	73.16%		74.65%		

The following candidates were elected:

- Party mandates - Peter Michael Ikrath (ÖVP), 2,253 votes; and Franz Riepl (SPÖ), 1,250 votes.

===== 2006 =====
Results of the 2006 legislative election held on 1 October 2006:

Party		Votes per district					Total votes	%	Seats
Party		Döb- ling	Her- nals	Otta- kring	Wäh- ring	Voting card	Total votes	%	Seats
Social Democratic Party of Austria	SPÖ	10,693	7,624	16,429	5,623	3,898	44,267	34.97%	1
Austrian People's Party	ÖVP	11,474	5,015	6,469	7,189	4,920	35,067	27.70%	1
The Greens – The Green Alternative	GRÜNE	5,995	4,399	6,402	5,605	3,089	25,490	20.13%	1
Freedom Party of Austria	FPÖ	3,509	2,812	5,508	2,013	1,142	14,984	11.84%	0
Hans-Peter Martin's List	MATIN	639	448	726	365	264	2,442	1.93%	0
Alliance for the Future of Austria	BZÖ	617	357	665	350	216	2,205	1.74%	0
Communist Party of Austria	KPÖ	313	287	481	231	122	1,434	1.13%	0
EU Withdrawal – Neutral Free Austria	NFÖ	112	72	122	56	28	390	0.31%	0
Socialist Left Party	SLP	84	54	121	42	17	318	0.25%	0
Valid Votes		33,436	21,068	36,923	21,474	13,696	126,597	100.00%	3
Rejected Votes		344	268	436	216	96	1,360	1.06%	
Total Polled		33,780	21,336	37,359	21,690	13,792	127,957	73.46%	
Registered Electors		49,895	33,329	58,325	32,627		174,176		
Turnout		67.70%	64.02%	64.05%	66.48%		73.46%		

The following candidates were elected:

- Personal mandates - Alexander Van der Bellen (GRÜNE), 13,054 votes.
- Party mandates - Maria Rauch-Kallat (ÖVP), 4,206 votes; and Franz Riepl (SPÖ), 1,617 votes.

===== 2002 =====
Results of the 2002 legislative election held on 24 November 2002:

Party		Votes per district					Total votes	%	Seats
Party		Döb- ling	Her- nals	Otta- kring	Wäh- ring	Voting card	Total votes	%	Seats
Social Democratic Party of Austria	SPÖ	12,817	8,463	18,750	6,793	3,201	50,024	37.54%	1
Austrian People's Party	ÖVP	15,425	7,617	10,768	9,829	4,107	47,746	35.83%	1
The Greens – The Green Alternative	GRÜNE	5,408	3,976	5,956	4,966	1,928	22,234	16.69%	0
Freedom Party of Austria	FPÖ	2,680	1,916	3,434	1,603	670	10,303	7.73%	0
Liberal Forum	LiF	421	262	441	255	89	1,468	1.10%	0
Communist Party of Austria	KPÖ	148	115	250	101	38	652	0.49%	0
Socialist Left Party	SLP	142	114	198	80	15	549	0.41%	0
The Democrats		70	51	82	44	17	264	0.20%	0
Valid Votes		37,111	22,514	39,879	23,671	10,065	133,240	100.00%	2
Rejected Votes		304	196	427	195	88	1,210	0.90%	
Total Polled		37,415	22,710	40,306	23,866	10,153	134,450	79.84%	
Registered Electors		48,921	31,453	56,141	31,886		168,401		
Turnout		76.48%	72.20%	71.79%	74.85%		79.84%		

The following candidates were elected:

- Party mandates - Maria Rauch-Kallat (ÖVP), 7,591 votes; and Franz Riepl (SPÖ), 1,828 votes.

Maria Rauch-Kallat (ÖVP) resigned on 4 March 2003 and was replaced by Walter Tancsits (ÖVP) on 5 March 2003.

==== 1990s ====
===== 1999 =====
Results of the 1999 legislative election held on 3 October 1999:

Party		Votes per district					Total votes	%	Seats
Party		Döb- ling	Her- nals	Otta- kring	Wäh- ring	Voting card	Total votes	%	Seats
Social Democratic Party of Austria	SPÖ	10,339	6,867	14,820	5,462	4,014	41,502	32.78%	1
Freedom Party of Austria	FPÖ	7,263	5,211	9,734	4,452	2,891	29,551	23.34%	1
Austrian People's Party	ÖVP	8,982	4,011	5,019	6,060	3,704	27,776	21.94%	1
The Greens – The Green Alternative	GRÜNE	3,531	2,394	3,610	3,037	1,587	14,159	11.18%	0
Liberal Forum	LiF	2,991	1,557	2,130	2,162	1,061	9,901	7.82%	0
The Independents	DU	544	371	706	310	184	2,115	1.67%	0
Communist Party of Austria	KPÖ	247	166	317	141	58	929	0.73%	0
No to NATO and EU – Neutral Austria Citizens' Initiative	NEIN	163	108	210	131	59	671	0.53%	0
Valid Votes		34,060	20,685	36,546	21,755	13,558	126,604	100.00%	3
Rejected Votes		369	212	474	230	87	1,372	1.07%	
Total Polled		34,429	20,897	37,020	21,985	13,645	127,976	75.95%	
Registered Electors		49,047	31,467	55,719	32,264		168,497		
Turnout		70.20%	66.41%	66.44%	68.14%		75.95%		

The following candidates were elected:

- Personal mandates - Gerhart Bruckmann (ÖVP), 6,237 votes; and Helene Partik-Pablé (FPÖ), 4,959 votes.
- Party mandates - Franz Riepl (SPÖ), 1,361 votes.

Gerhart Bruckmann (ÖVP) was replaced by Maria Rauch-Kallat (ÖVP) on 3 July 2001.

===== 1995 =====
Results of the 1995 legislative election held on 17 December 1995:

Party		Votes per district					Total votes	%	Seats
Party		Döb- ling	Her- nals	Otta- kring	Wäh- ring	Voting card	Total votes	%	Seats
Social Democratic Party of Austria	SPÖ	13,997	9,502	19,471	7,805	2,960	53,735	38.51%	2
Austrian People's Party	ÖVP	12,106	5,423	6,759	8,133	2,453	34,874	24.99%	1
Freedom Party of Austria	FPÖ	6,659	5,062	9,385	4,320	1,472	26,898	19.27%	1
Liberal Forum	LiF	4,021	2,193	3,190	2,756	795	12,955	9.28%	0
The Greens – The Green Alternative	GRÜNE	2,226	1,622	2,419	2,020	646	8,933	6.40%	0
No – Civic Action Group; Against the Sale of Austria	NEIN	404	258	460	270	75	1,467	1.05%	0
Communist Party of Austria	KPÖ	116	71	173	61	13	434	0.31%	0
Natural Law Party	ÖNP	62	56	75	47	17	257	0.18%	0
Valid Votes		39,591	24,187	41,932	25,412	8,431	139,553	100.00%	4
Rejected Votes		430	319	697	324	62	1,832	1.30%	
Total Polled		40,021	24,506	42,629	25,736	8,493	141,385	80.70%	
Registered Electors		50,745	32,883	57,869	33,701		175,198		
Turnout		78.87%	74.52%	73.66%	76.37%		80.70%		

The following candidates were elected:

- Personal mandates - Helene Partik-Pablé (FPÖ), 5,897 votes.
- Party mandates - Elisabeth Hlavac (SPÖ), 1,537 votes; Heinrich Neisser (ÖVP), 4,112 votes; and Franz Riepl (SPÖ), 1,947 votes.

===== 1994 =====
Results of the 1994 legislative election held on 9 October 1994:

Party		Votes per district					Total votes	%	Seats
Party		Döb- ling	Her- nals	Otta- kring	Wäh- ring	Voting card	Total votes	%	Seats
Social Democratic Party of Austria	SPÖ	11,386	7,691	15,866	5,973	3,662	44,578	33.43%	1
Freedom Party of Austria	FPÖ	7,149	5,357	9,816	4,699	2,622	29,643	22.23%	1
Austrian People's Party	ÖVP	9,270	4,244	5,262	6,322	3,290	28,388	21.29%	1
Liberal Forum	LiF	4,581	2,299	3,416	3,026	1,281	14,603	10.95%	0
The Greens – The Green Alternative	GRÜNE	3,773	2,412	3,488	2,985	1,253	13,911	10.43%	0
No – Civic Action Group; Against the Sale of Austria	NEIN	333	215	394	227	117	1,286	0.96%	0
Communist Party of Austria	KPÖ	119	69	157	77	31	453	0.34%	0
Natural Law Party	ÖNP	61	56	69	57	13	256	0.19%	0
Citizen Greens Austria – Free Democrats	BGÖ	32	17	28	34	11	122	0.09%	0
United Greens Austria – List Adi Pinter	VGÖ	28	24	40	20	9	121	0.09%	0
Valid Votes		36,732	22,384	38,536	23,420	12,289	133,361	100.00%	3
Rejected Votes		371	282	540	238	94	1,525	1.13%	
Total Polled		37,103	22,666	39,076	23,658	12,383	134,886	75.33%	
Registered Electors		51,316	33,797	59,527	34,418		179,058		
Turnout		72.30%	67.07%	65.64%	68.74%		75.33%		

The following candidates were elected:

- Personal mandates - Heinrich Neisser (ÖVP), 4,735 votes; and Helene Partik-Pablé (FPÖ), 7,068 votes.
- Party mandates - Franz Mrkvicka (SPÖ), 2,067 votes.
