= Viktor Korchnoi =

Soviet-Swiss chess grandmaster (1931–2016)

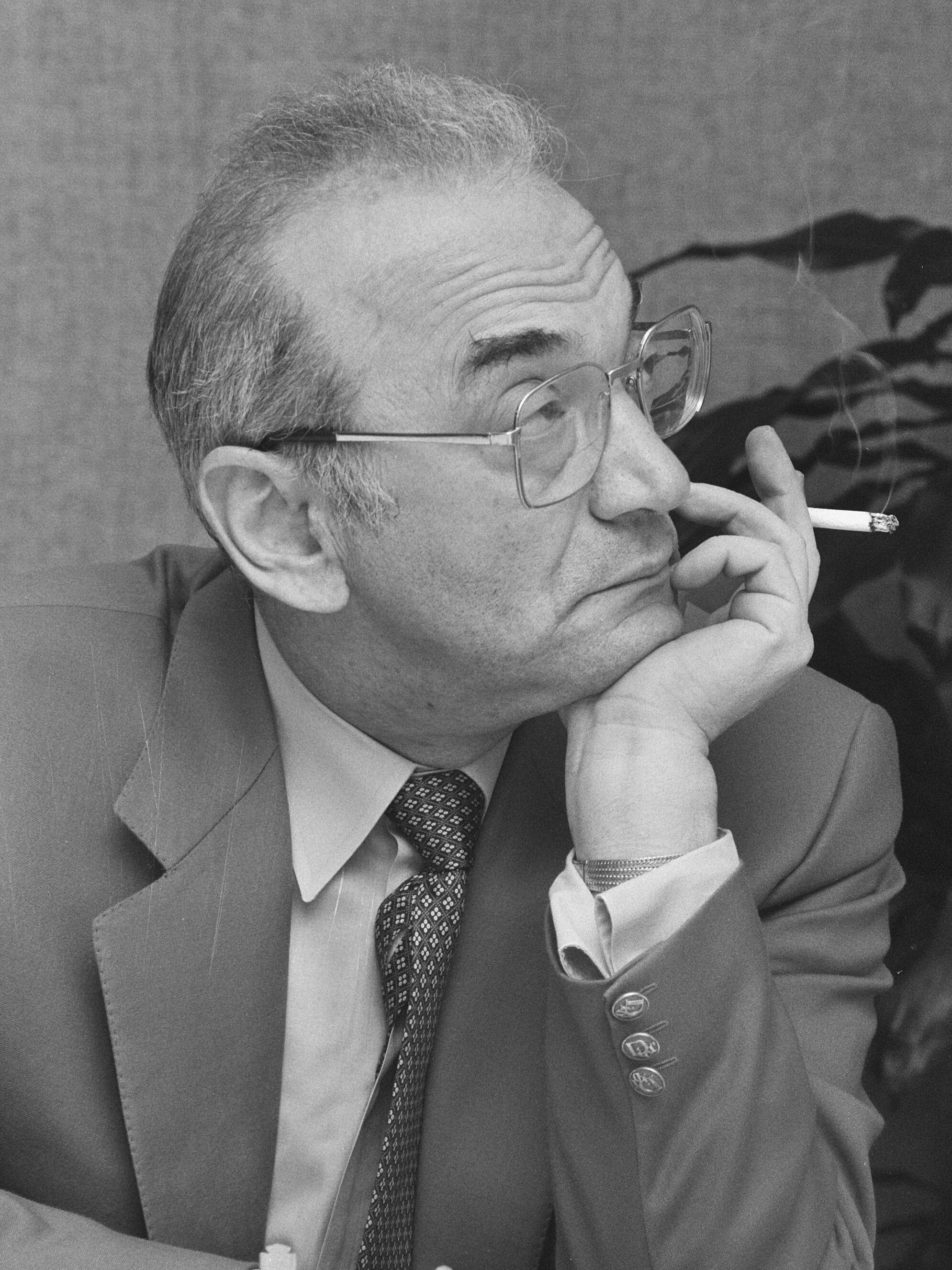
- Korchnoi in 1987

Personal information
- Born: Viktor Lvovich Korchnoi Виктор Львович Корчной; 23 March 1931 Leningrad, Russian SFSR, Soviet Union
- Died: 6 June 2016 (aged 85) Wohlen, Aargau, Switzerland

Chess career
- Country: Soviet Union (until 1977); Stateless (1977–1979); Switzerland (from 1979)
- Title: Grandmaster (1956)
- Peak rating: 2695 (January 1979)
- Peak ranking: No. 2 (January 1976)

Viktor Lvovich Korchnoi (Note: Variously romanized as Korchnoy, Kortchnoy, Kortschnoj.) (Russian: Виктор Львович Корчной, IPA: [vʲiktər ˈlʲvovʲɪtɕ kɐrtɕˈnoj]; 23 March 1931 – 6 June 2016) was a Soviet and later Swiss chess grandmaster and chess writer. He is considered one of the strongest players never to have become World Chess Champion.

Born in Leningrad, Korchnoi defected to the Netherlands in 1976, and resided in Switzerland from 1978, becoming a Swiss citizen in 1980.

Korchnoi effectively played Anatoly Karpov three times for the World Championship. In 1974, he lost to Karpov in the Candidates Tournament final, and Karpov became World Champion after Bobby Fischer declined to defend the title. Then in the next two world championship cycles, 1978 and 1981, Korchnoi won the Candidates but lost the World Championship match to Karpov.

Korchnoi was a candidate for the World Championship on ten occasions (1962, 1968, 1971, 1974, 1977, 1980, 1983, 1985, 1988, and 1991). He was also four times a USSR Chess Champion, five times a member of Soviet teams that won the European championship, and six times a member of Soviet teams that won the Chess Olympiad. He played competitive chess until old age. At age 75, he won the 2006 World Senior Chess Championship and became the oldest person ever to be ranked among the world's top 100 players.

== Early life, family, and education ==
Korchnoi was born on 23 March 1931 in Leningrad, Russian SFSR, Soviet Union, to a Jewish mother and a Polish-Catholic father. His mother, Zelda Gershevna Azbel (1910—?), a daughter of the Yiddish writer Hersh Azbel, was a pianist and alumna of Leningrad Conservatory of Music; his father, Lev Merkuryevich Korchnoi (1910–1941), was an engineer, who worked at a candy factory.

Both parents came to Leningrad with their families from Ukraine in 1928: mother from Borispol and father from Melitopol. After their divorce, Victor lived with his mother until 1935, then with his father and paternal grandmother. They suffered under the siege of Leningrad during which Victor's father was killed in 1941. Victor's stepmother and adoptive mother Roza Abramovna Fridman then took responsibility for his upbringing. (She would later live with him in Switzerland.)

He graduated from Leningrad State University with a major in history.

== Early chess development ==
He learned to play chess from his father at the age of five. In 1943, he joined the chess club of the Leningrad Pioneer Palace, and was trained by Abram Model, Andrei Batuyev, and Vladimir Zak. Model had earlier played a major role in the development of future World Champion Mikhail Botvinnik, while Zak, who later co-authored a book with Korchnoi, had also helped train future World Champion Boris Spassky.

=== Soviet Junior Champion ===
In 1947, Korchnoi won the Junior Championship of the USSR, with 11½/15 at Leningrad, and shared the title in 1948 with 5/7 at Tallinn, Estonia.

=== Young master ===
In 1951, he earned the Soviet Master title, following his second-place finish in the 1950 Leningrad Championship, with 9/13.

=== First Soviet final ===
One year later, Korchnoi qualified for the finals of the USSR Chess Championship for the first time. In the semifinal at Minsk, 1952, he scored 10½/17 for a shared 2nd–4th place, to advance. In the 20th Soviet final, held at Moscow, he scored 11/19 for sixth place, as GM Mikhail Botvinnik and GM Mark Taimanov came joint first. The next year, he again had to qualify through the semifinal event held at Vilnius 1953, with 9/14 for a shared 3rd–4th place. Korchnoi improved on the previous year's showing with his shared 2nd–3rd place in URS-ch21 at Kiev 1954, on 13/19, as GM Yuri Averbakh won.

== International titles ==
This high championship placing was rewarded with his first international opportunity, a participation in Bucharest 1954, where he finished in clear first place with 13/17. FIDE awarded him the title of International Master in 1954. He won the 1955 Leningrad Championship with a massive score of 17/19, and shared 1st–2nd places at Hastings 1955–56 on 7/9. He was awarded the Grandmaster title at the FIDE Congress in 1956.

== Soviet team record ==
Korchnoi earned his first international team selection for the Soviet student team in 1954, joined the full national team for the European Team Championship three years later, and would represent the USSR through 1974. He won 21 medals for the USSR. His complete Soviet international team play results follow:

- Oslo 1954, Student Olympiad, board 1, 4½/7 (+3−1=3), team silver
- Uppsala 1956, Student Olympiad, board 1, 6/7 (+5−0=2), team gold
- Vienna 1957, European Team Championship, board 8, 5½/6 (+5−0=1), team gold, board gold
- Leipzig 1960 Olympiad, board 4, 10½/13 (+8−0=5), team gold; board bronze
- Oberhausen 1961, European Team Championship, board 6, 8½/9 (+8−0=1), team gold, board gold
- Hamburg 1965, European Team Championship, board 3, 5½/9 (+4−2=3), team gold, board gold
- Havana 1966 Olympiad, 1st reserve, 10½/13 (+9−1=3), team gold, board gold
- Lugano 1968 Olympiad, board 3, 11/13 (+9−0=4), team gold
- Kapfenberg 1970, European Team Championship, board 2, 4/6 (+2−0=4), team gold
- Siegen 1970 Olympiad, board 3, 11/15 (+8−1=6), team gold, board bronze
- Skopje 1972 Olympiad, board 2, 11/15 (+8−1=6), team gold, board gold
- Bath 1973, European Team Championship, board 3, 4/6 (+3−1=2), team gold
- Nice 1974 Olympiad, board 2, 11½/15 (+8−0=7), team gold, board bronze

== Strong Grandmaster ==
Korchnoi rose to prominence within the Soviet chess school system, where he competed against his contemporaries and future GM stars such as Mikhail Tal, Tigran Petrosian, and Boris Spassky, following in the path laid out by Mikhail Botvinnik. Korchnoi's playing style initially was an aggressive counterattack. He excelled in difficult defensive positions.

His results during the 1950s were often inconsistent. One particularly bad result was his 19th place (only one from bottom) at the URSch-22, Moscow 1955, with 6/19. During the 1960s he became more versatile, as he gained experience at the top level. He won at Kraków 1959 with 8½/11, shared 1st–2nd places with GM Samuel Reshevsky at Buenos Aires 1960 with 13/19, and won at Córdoba, Argentina 1960 with 6/7. After his victory at Budapest 1961 (Géza Maróczy Memorial) with 11½/15 ahead of GMs David Bronstein and Miroslav Filip, each with 9½, Korchnoi was recognized as one of the world's best players.

== Soviet Championship titles ==
Korchnoi won the USSR Chess Championship four times during his career. At Leningrad 1960 for URS-ch27, he scored 14/19. He won at Yerevan 1962, URS-ch30, with 13/19. He won at Kiev 1964–65 with 15/19. His final title was at Riga 1970, for URS-ch38, with 16/21.

== World Championship title candidate ==
He first qualified as a candidate from the 1962 Stockholm Interzonal, scoring 14/22 for a shared 4th–5th-place finish, a tournament won by Fischer. The 1962 Candidates tournament, the last held in a round-robin format until 1985, was held at Curaçao a few months later and Korchnoi placed fifth out of eight with an even score, 13½/27, which Tigran Petrosian won, winning the right to challenge Botvinnik. Korchnoi's results included two victories over Fischer, one a brilliant win employing the Pirc Defense with the black pieces.

Korchnoi won at Havana 1963 with 16½/21, but fared less well in the next Soviet Championship, URS-ch31 at Leningrad, with just 10/19 for 10th place. He missed qualifying for the next world championship cycle, 1964–66, because of a poor showing at the 1964 Zonal tournament in Moscow, where he made 5½/12 for a shared 5th–6th place, so did not advance to the Interzonal. Korchnoi regained his form with an overwhelming triumph at Gyula, Hungary, in 1965 with 14½/15. He won at Bucharest 1966 with 12½/14, and at the Chigorin Memorial in Sochi 1966 with 11½/15.

== Candidates' finalist, first time ==
In the 1969 World Championship cycle, he tied for 3rd–5th places at the URS-ch34, held at Tbilisi 1966–67, with 12/20, and emerged from a three-way playoff, along with GM Aivars Gipslis, at Tallinn 1967, to the Interzonal, staged at Sousse, Tunisia, later that year. A strong performance at the Interzonal, with 14/22, for a shared 2nd–4th place, took him through to the Candidates' matches. In his first match, he defeated American GM Samuel Reshevsky at Amsterdam in 1968 by (+3=5). His next opponent was GM Mikhail Tal, against whom Korchnoi had a large plus score in previous meetings. The match, held in Moscow 1968, was close, but Korchnoi won by (+2−1=7), and moved on to face GM Boris Spassky in the Candidates' final. Spassky prevailed at Kiev 1968, winning (+4−1=5).

== USSR vs. Rest of the World 1970; Rest of the World vs. USSR 1984 ==
Korchnoi represented the USSR on board three in the first Russia (USSR) vs. Rest of the World team match, Belgrade 1970, which took place across ten boards. He played four games with Hungarian GM Lajos Portisch, drawing three and losing one. In 1984, eight years after his defection, Korchnoi played board three in the second Rest of the World vs USSR match in London, with the match again held across ten boards. He faced Soviet GM Lev Polugaevsky, his former teammate, in three games, winning one and drawing two; he then faced GM Vladimir Tukmakov in one game, drawing. Korchnoi was the only player to play for each side in the series of two team matches.

== Plays secret training matches ==
Korchnoi, as the losing finalist, was exempt from qualifying for the 1972 World Chess Championship, and was seeded directly to the following Candidates' event. To prepare, he first played a secret training match with his good friend GM David Bronstein, who drew the 1951 World Championship match, in Leningrad 1970, losing 3½–2½. This result was kept secret until 1995; the games from this match were kept secret until 2007, when they were eventually published in Bronstein's last book, Secret Notes. Then, he played a secret training match against GM Anatoly Karpov, with whom he was close friends at the time, at Leningrad 1971; this wound up drawn in six games (+2−2=2); Korchnoi took the Black pieces in five of them, for training purposes. These games were eventually published in 1976.

Korchnoi won his first round 1971 match against GM Efim Geller at Moscow by (+4−1=3), after which he went down to defeat in the semifinal versus GM Tigran Petrosian by (−1=9), also at Moscow, with the ninth game the only decisive result.

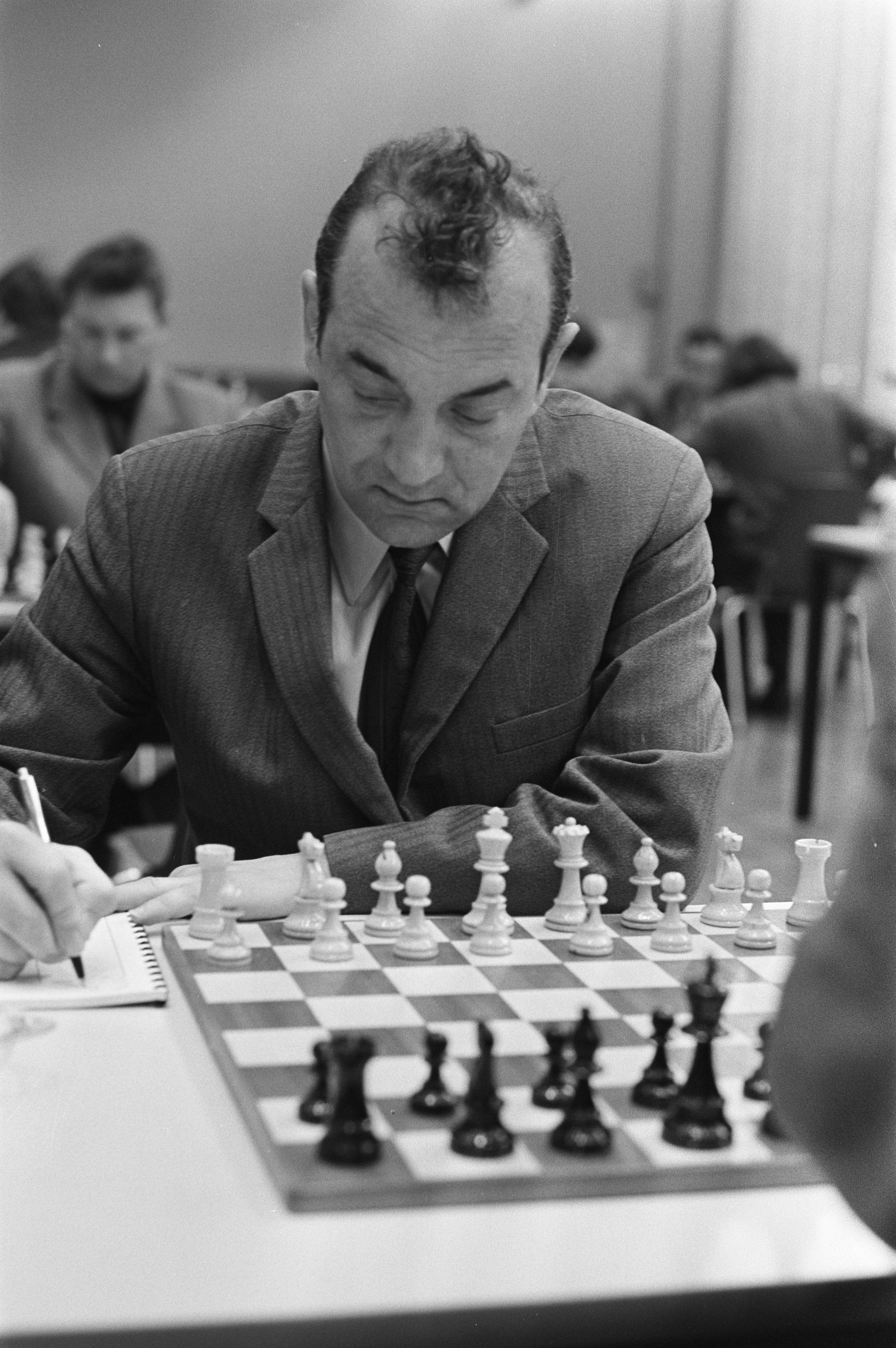
Korchnoi (Amsterdam, 1972)

=== Actor ===
In 1972, Korchnoi appeared in the chess-themed Soviet film Grossmeister along with several other grandmasters; he played the role of the lead actor's trainer.

== Candidates' finalist, second time ==
In the 1975 World Championship cycle Korchnoi and Karpov, the newest star of Soviet chess, tied for first in the 1973 Leningrad Interzonal. In the 1974 Candidates' matches, Korchnoi first defeated the young Brazilian star GM Henrique Costa Mecking (who had won the other Interzonal in Petrópolis), by (+3−1=9) at Augusta, Georgia, in what he later described in his autobiography as a tough match. Korchnoi next played Petrosian again, at Odesa. The two were not on friendly terms, and it was even rumored that the two resorted to kicking each other under the table during this match; however, Korchnoi denies this. According to him, Petrosian just kicked his legs nervously and shook the table. Although the match was supposed to go to the first player to win four games, Petrosian resigned the match after just five games, with Korchnoi enjoying a lead of 3–1, with one draw.

With his victory over Petrosian, Korchnoi advanced to face Karpov in the Candidates' Final, the match to determine who would challenge reigning world champion Bobby Fischer in 1975. In the run-up to the match, Korchnoi was virtually unable to find any Grandmasters to assist him. Bronstein apparently assisted Korchnoi, for which he was punished. Bronstein, in his last book, Secret Notes, published in 2007, wrote that he advised Korchnoi before the match began, but then had to leave to play an event himself; when he returned, Korchnoi was down by three games. Bronstein then assisted Korchnoi for the final stages. Korchnoi also received some assistance later in the match from two British masters, IM (later GM) Raymond Keene and IM William Hartston. Korchnoi trailed 3–0 late in the match, but won games 19 and 21 to make it very close right to the end. Karpov eventually won this battle, played in late 1974 in Moscow, by a 12½–11½ score. By default, Karpov became the twelfth world champion in April 1975, when Fischer refused to defend his title because of disputed match conditions.

== Defection ==
In the lead-up to the Candidates' Final in 1974, as part of a campaign to promote Karpov over Korchnoi, Tigran Petrosian made a public statement in the press against Korchnoi, with the Soviet federation, wishing to develop younger players, taking the stance that the generation (including Korchnoi) which had been defeated by Bobby Fischer could no longer hope to compete successfully against him. At the closing ceremony of the Candidates' Final, Korchnoi had made his mind up that he had to leave the Soviet Union. The central authorities prevented Korchnoi from playing any international tournaments outside the USSR. Even when Korchnoi was invited by GM Paul Keres and IM Iivo Nei to participate in a 1975 International Tournament in the Estonian SSR, Korchnoi was not allowed to play, and both Keres and Nei were reprimanded.

Keres did play a short, apparently secret, training match at Tallinn 1975 with Korchnoi, who won (+1=1). Korchnoi was then allowed to play the Soviet Team Championship and an international tournament in Moscow later in 1975. The ban against Korchnoi competing outside the USSR was lifted when he accompanied fellow veteran GMs Mark Taimanov and Bronstein to London to play a Scheveningen-style event (where each team member competes against only the other team's players) against three young British masters: Jonathan Mestel, Michael Stean and David S. Goodman. Korchnoi then played the international tournament at Hastings, 1975–76.

Korchnoi, in a 2006 lecture in London, mentioned that the breakthrough that allowed him to resume international appearances came when Anatoly Karpov inherited the World Championship title forfeited by Fischer. Questions arose about how Karpov had qualified to be a World Champion, when he had never played Fischer. Since Korchnoi was not publicly visible, it was largely believed that he (and Karpov) could not be very strong. Korchnoi was then allowed to play the 1976 Amsterdam tournament, as a means to prove Karpov was a worthy World Champion. Korchnoi was joint winner of the tournament, along with GM Tony Miles.

At the end of the tournament, Korchnoi asked Miles to spell "political asylum" for him, whereupon Korchnoi entered the police station to defect. He had smuggled his chess library out of the USSR in two stages, on this trip as well as the previous year's trip to England. Korchnoi thus became the first strong Soviet grandmaster to defect from the Soviet Union. He left his wife Bella and son Igor behind. The defection resulted in a turbulent period of excellent tournament results, losses in the two matches for the World Title, all overshadowed by the oppressive political climate of the Cold War.

Korchnoi resided in the Netherlands for some time, giving simultaneous exhibitions. He played a short match against GM Jan Timman – the strongest active non-Soviet player at that time – and comprehensively defeated him. He moved to West Germany for a short period, and by 1978 had settled in Switzerland, eventually becoming a Swiss citizen.

== First World Championship match against Karpov ==
In the next world championship cycle (1976–78), for which he qualified as the losing finalist, Korchnoi first had to overcome Soviet demands that he be forfeited due to his defection; FIDE President GM Max Euwe defended Korchnoi's right to participate. Korchnoi began actual play by again vanquishing Petrosian, by (+2−1=9) in the quarter-final round at Il Ciocco, Italy, taking a clinching draw in a clearly favourable position in the final game. In the semifinal, held at Evian, France, Korchnoi won against GM Lev Polugaevsky, with a score of (+5−1=7). The final, in which he faced Spassky at Belgrade, began with five wins and five draws for Korchnoi, after which he lost four consecutive games. The match was noteworthy for Spassky's scandalous psychological behavior after game 10 where Spassky refused to play at the game board, instead analyzing the game from a demonstration board while seated in a box located behind Korchnoi. Ultimately, Korchnoi steeled himself and finally secured victory in the match by (+7−4=7) to emerge as the challenger to Karpov, having defeated three world-class Soviet contenders.

The World Championship match of 1978 was held in Baguio, Philippines. There was enormous controversy off the board, ranging from X-raying of chairs, protests about the flags used on the board, hypnotism complaints and the mirror glasses used by Korchnoi. When Karpov's team sent him a bilberry yogurt during a game without any request for one by Karpov, the Korchnoi team protested, claiming it could be some kind of code (such as whether Korchnoi was dead equal or slightly advantageous). They later said this was intended as a parody of earlier protests, but it was taken seriously at the time.

In quality of play, the match itself never measured up to the press headlines that it generated, although as a sporting contest it had its share of excitement. The match would go to the first player to win six games, draws not counting. After 17 games, Karpov had an imposing 4–1 lead. Korchnoi won game 21, but Karpov won game 27, putting him on the brink of victory with a 5–2 lead. Korchnoi bravely fought back, scoring three wins and one draw in the next four games, to equalise the match at 5–5 after 31 games. However, Karpov won the very next game, and the match, by 6–5 with 21 draws.

Shortly before the match began, Korchnoi's son, who along with Korchnoi's wife had applied to leave the Soviet Union, was drafted into the Soviet army and went into hiding. In 1979 he was sentenced to two-and-a-half years in prison for draft evasion.

Korchnoi alleged that Raymond Keene, his second in the World Championship match, broke his contract by writing a book about the match (which appeared three days after the match finished) having specifically signed an agreement "not to write, compile or help to write or compile any book during the course of the match". Korchnoi commented: "Mr Keene betrayed me. He violated the contract. It was clear that while Mr Keene was writing one book and then another, Mr Stean was doing his work for him." Attempts to defend Keene were rebutted by Michael Stean's mother, who stated that she was in a position to know what was in Keene's contract since she herself had typed it. Keene, she claimed, had signed this despite having already negotiated a contract with Batsford to write a book about the match. She described "a premeditated and deliberate plan to deceive" and noted that Keene's conduct had come under suspicion during the match.

== Second World Championship match against Karpov ==
As the losing world title match finalist, Korchnoi was seeded into the next cycle's final eight players. In his first match, Korchnoi once more defeated Petrosian in March 1980 at Velden am Wörthersee, Austria, by 5½ to 3½. This victory earned him a rematch with Polugaevsky, whom he had defeated in the previous cycle. At Buenos Aires during July and August 1980, Korchnoi again triumphed by 7½ to 6½; the match was tied following the regulation ten games. In the final match, at Meran, Italy, from December 1980 to January 1981, Korchnoi was leading West German GM Robert Hübner by 4½ to 3½, with two more possible regulation games to come, when Hübner withdrew from the match. This forfeit advanced Korchnoi to a rematch for the title against Karpov.

This final match was also held in Meran, Italy. In what was dubbed the "Massacre in Meran", Karpov defeated Korchnoi by six wins to two, with ten draws.

The headlines of the tournament again largely centered on the political issues. Korchnoi's wife and son had been denied emigration and were still in the Soviet Union. His son was released from prison in 1982 and was promptly drafted again. But later that year, Korchnoi's wife, son and step mother were allowed to leave the USSR. Korchnoi divorced his wife soon after. At the time he was living with Petra Leeuwerik, a German woman who had been imprisoned in the Soviet Union and who had led Korchnoi's delegation during the candidate matches in 1977; the two would later marry.

== Playing Kasparov ==
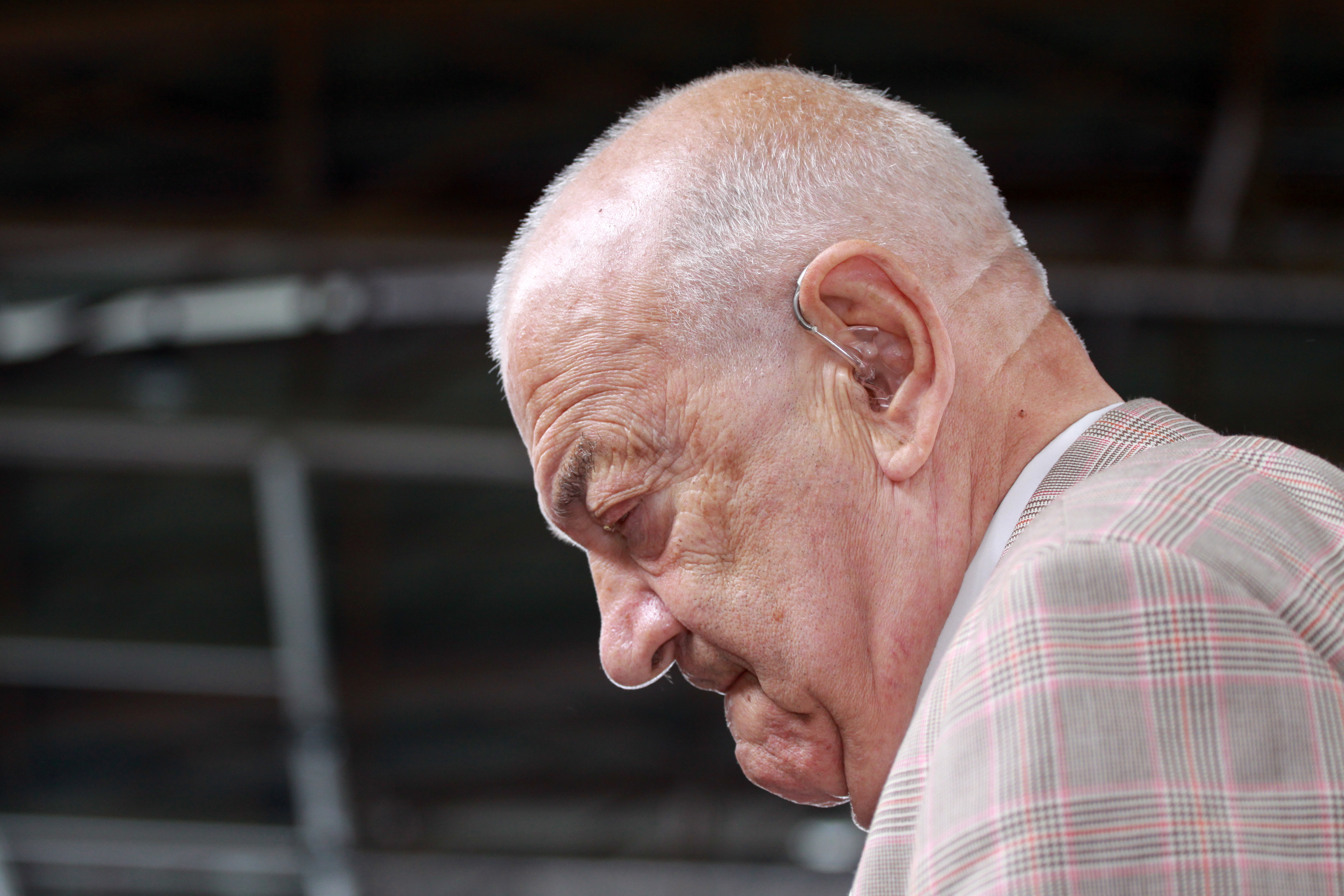
Korchnoi in 2009

Korchnoi still had a vital part to play in the next (1984) Candidates' cycle, although he never reached the highest pinnacle again. In the first match, he defeated GM Lajos Portisch by 6–3 at Bad Kissingen 1983. In the second round, he was to play the young Soviet GM Garry Kasparov, who at the time was battling against a Soviet Chess Federation that was clearly in favour of Anatoly Karpov. The match was to be held in Pasadena, California, but the Soviet Chess Federation protested (possibly because Korchnoi was a defector and the match was in the cold-war enemy's back yard, in a place closed to Soviet diplomats at the time, and because of the soon-to-be-announced Soviet decision to boycott the 1984 Olympic Games in Los Angeles). Kasparov was not allowed to fly there to play the match. This defaulted the match to Korchnoi. Another Soviet contender, former Champion GM Vassily Smyslov, was also at first forfeited to Hungarian GM Zoltan Ribli, with their match set to take place in the United Arab Emirates.

However, upon intervention by prominent British chess organizer GM Raymond Keene, who quickly stepped up to raise a large amount of sponsorship money to save the troubled matches, Korchnoi agreed to play Kasparov in London, which at the same time also hosted the Smyslov vs. Ribli match. This was a gracious gesture by Korchnoi, since technically he had already won by default. After a good start, winning the first game, Korchnoi was beaten by a score of 7–4, with Kasparov, who was 32 years younger, proving that his all-round game and youthful stamina were too strong.

== Three more Candidates' appearances ==
After the 1983 Kasparov match, Korchnoi continued playing at a top level but without seriously threatening the world championship again. In the 1985–87 World Championship cycle he finished equal thirteenth out of 16 in the Candidates' Tournament at Montpellier.

In the 1988–90 cycle, he made the final 16 again, but was eliminated in the first round of Candidates' matches, held at Saint John, New Brunswick, Canada, losing to Iceland's GM Johann Hjartarson in extra games, by 4½ to 3½.

Finally, in the 1991–93 cycle, he defeated GM Gyula Sax of Hungary in the first round, by 5½ to 4½ at Wijk aan Zee. Then, at Brussels, he lost to GM Jan Timman of the Netherlands by 4½ to 2½, ending his run at the world championship, which stretched from 1962 to 1991.

== Later career ==
He continued to play in Europe and around the world to an advanced age, living in his adopted country of Switzerland. He frequently represented their Olympiad team on top board, beginning in 1978, even though his Elo rating was sometimes considerably below that of compatriot Vadim Milov, who appeared not to make himself available for selection.

From 2001 onwards, Korchnoi became a prolific author of books on his career, publishing five new volumes, including two books of annotated games, an updated autobiography, and an overview (along with several other authors) of Soviet politics applying to chess; he also wrote a book on rook endings.

In 2001, Korchnoi won the Biel Chess Festival for the second time in the grandmasters division, having also won in 1979. This 22-year gap still stands as the longest time period between being champion at Biel tournament, or quite possibly any international chess tournament.

In September 2006, Korchnoi won the 16th World Senior Chess Championship, held in Arvier (Valle d'Aosta, Italy), at age 75, with a 9–2 score. Korchnoi scored 7½–½ in his first eight games, then drew his last three games.

On the January 2007 FIDE rating list Korchnoi was ranked number 85 in the world at age 75, the oldest player ever to be ranked in the FIDE top 100. The second-oldest player on the January 2007 list was Alexander Beliavsky, age 53, who was 22 years younger than Korchnoi. In 2011, Korchnoi was still active in the chess world with a notable win (in Gibraltar) with black against the 18-year-old Fabiano Caruana, who was rated above 2700 and 61 years Korchnoi's junior.

Korchnoi became the oldest player ever to win a national championship, when he won the 2009 Swiss championship at age 78. He won the national title again a few months after his 80th birthday in July 2011 after a playoff game with Joseph Gallagher.

=== Declining health ===
Till the very end, Korchnoi remained a fierce competitor. In late December 2012, it was reported that Korchnoi was recovering from a stroke and was unlikely to play competitive chess again. He was scheduled to play in the 37th Zurich Christmas Open tournament in December 2013, but he withdrew for health reasons. However, in 2014, he returned to the board to play a two-game match against GM Wolfgang Uhlmann (1935–2020), winning both games; the combined age of the two players was 162 years, which is almost certainly a record for a standard play match between Grandmasters. In 2015, the two played a four-game rapid match (25 minutes per player for all moves, plus 30 seconds extra per move), which was drawn 2–2. Korchnoi's final match against another Grandmaster was a similar four-game rapid match in November 2015, against GM Mark Taimanov (1926–2016) – the first time since 1980 that Korchnoi had played in an official or friendly match against an opponent older than himself. The combined ages of the players was 174. Korchnoi won the match 2–1 with one draw.

== Death ==
Korchnoi died aged 85 on 6 June 2016 in the Swiss city of Wohlen.

== Legacy ==
FIDE President Kirsan Ilyumzhinov said that Korchnoi "has contributed substantially to the popularisation of our sport and is considered rightly as one of the strongest and charismatic players in the entire history of world chess". One obituary, written by Leonard Barden, called him "the greatest player never to have been world champion".

Korchnoi was comfortable playing with or without the initiative. He could attack, counterattack, play positionally, and was a master of the endgame. He became known as the master of counterattack, and he was the most difficult opponent of Mikhail Tal, an out-and-out attacker. He had a large lifetime plus score against Tal (+13−4=17), and also had plus scores against world champions Petrosian and Spassky. He had equal records against Botvinnik (+1−1=2) and Fischer (+2−2=4). He defeated nine undisputed world champions from Botvinnik through to Garry Kasparov, and Magnus Carlsen.

At times Korchnoi displayed his temper after losing games by sweeping all the pieces off the board. Among his colleagues, he had a reputation of being short tempered. At times, however, he displayed genial manners. In the 1983 U.S. Open Chess Championship in Pasadena, California, Korchnoi was paired against GM Larry Christiansen who was late showing up to the game when his "old jalopy" car ran out of gas on the way to the event. Rather than starting Christiansen's clock, Korchnoi waited until Christiansen arrived.

Korchnoi never succeeded in becoming world chess champion, but many people consider him the strongest player never to have done so, a distinction also often attributed to Akiba Rubinstein and Paul Keres. On the other hand, the 10th world champion Boris Spassky argued that Korchnoi did not deserve to be champion, both because he did not play the best moves (sometimes taking 140 moves to win a game that could have been won in 40), and because he did not have any individuality.

One of the variations of the English Opening is called the Korchnoi Variation, a variation for White against the French Defense is called the Korchnoi Gambit and a closed variation of the Sicilian Defense is called the Korchnoi Defense.

=== Records ===
Korchnoi defeated nine undisputed world champions (Botvinnik, Smyslov, Tal, Petrosian, Spassky, Fischer, Karpov, Kasparov and Carlsen), a record he shares with Paul Keres and Alexander Beliavsky.

He was the only player to have won or drawn—in individual game(s)—against every World Chess Champion, disputed or undisputed, in the period between the world chess championship interregnum of World War II and his death.

== Books ==
- Genna Sosonko (2018). Evil-Doer: Half a Century with Viktor Korchnoi. LLC Elk and Ruby Publishing House. ISBN 978-5-9500-4338-3.
- Victor Korchnoi; V. G. Zak (1974). King's Gambit. Batsford. ISBN 978-0-7134-2914-5.
- Victor Korchnoi (1977). Chess is My Life. Batsford. ISBN 0-7134-1025-6.
- Victor Korchnoi; Lenny Cavallaro (1981). Persona non grata. Thinkers' Press. ISBN 0-938650-15-7.
- Victor Korchnoi (2001). My Best Games, Vol 1: Games with White. Trafalgar Square. ISBN 978-3-283-00404-0.
- Victor Korchnoi (2002). My Best Games, Vol 2: Games with Black. Trafalgar Square. ISBN 978-3-283-00405-7.
- Victor Korchnoi (2002). Practical Rook Endings. Olms. ISBN 3-283-00401-3.
- Victor Korchnoi (2005). Chess is My Life, Vol 3: Biography. Trafalgar Square. ISBN 978-3-283-00406-4.
- Victor Korchnoi; Boris Gulko; Yuri Felshtinsky; Vladimir Popov (2011). The KGB Plays Chess: The Soviet Secret Police and the Fight for the World Chess Crown. Russell Enterprises. ISBN 978-1-888690-75-0.
- Andrew Soltis (2020). Tal, Petrosian, Spassky and Korchnoi: A Chess Multibiography with 207 Games. McFarland. ISBN 978-1476683645.

== In popular culture ==
- Korchnoi's 1976 defection is thought to have inspired in part the plot of the 1986 musical Chess.
- In Dangerous Moves, a film from 1984, the "match and the characters are reminiscent of the real-life 1981 match between Viktor Korchnoi and Anatoly Karpov".
- The year 2018 saw the release of a documentary film, Closing Gambit, which "tells the full story of the infamous 1978 Karpov–Korchnoi match".

== See also ==
- List of Eastern Bloc defectors
- List of Jewish chess players
