= Samuel Schweber =

Argentine chess player (1936–2017)

Samuel Schweber (16 July 1936 in Buenos Aires – 1 January 2017) was an Argentine chess player.

Schweber played in several Argentine chess championships. He was 7-8th in 1956 (Raúl Sanguineti won), 4-6th in 1960 (Miguel Najdorf won), 2nd in 1963 (Raimundo García won), 3rd in 1965 (Sanguineti won), 5-8th in 1967 (Najdorf won), 2nd in 1968 (Sanguineti won), 3rd-4th in 1969 (Carlos Juárez won), 3rd-4th in 1980 (Miguel Quinteros won).

In tournaments, he was 9th in the 1955 World Junior Championship in Antwerp (Boris Spassky won), 2nd at São Paulo 1960 (zonal, Julio Bolbochán won), and finished 19-20th at Stockholm 1962 (interzonal). In 1962, he tied for 3rd-4th in Mar del Plata (Latin American; Garcia won). In 1963, Schweber won in São Paulo. In 1963, he tied for 3rd-5th in Fortaleza (zonal, Héctor Rossetto won). In 1964, he took 2nd in Rio de Janeiro (zonal, playoff).

In 1966, he tied for 5-6th in Buenos Aires / Rio Hondo (zonal, Henrique Mecking won). In 1966, he took 2nd, behind Mecking, in São Paulo. In 1966, he tied for 3rd-6th in Havana (Pan-American; Eleazar Jiménez won). In 1968, he took 3rd in Chacabuco (Carlos Guimard won). In 1968, he took 3rd in Buenos Aires. In 1969, he took 9th in Mar del Plata (zonal, Najdorf and Oscar Panno won). In 1970, he tied for 16-17th in Buenos Aires (Fischer won). In 1971, he took 11th in Mar del Plata (Lev Polugaevsky won).

In 1976, he tied for 6-7th in Mar del Plata (Victor Brond won). In 1979, he tied for 12-13th in Buenos Aires (Ljubomir Ljubojević and Viktor Korchnoi won). In 1982, he tied for 9-11th in Moron (zonal, Quinteros won). In 1991, he tied for 9-11th in Buenos Aires (Bent Larsen won).

He played for Argentina in five Chess Olympiads.

- In 1960, at first reserve board in 14th Chess Olympiad in Leipzig (+6 –2 =2);
- In 1964, at third board in 16th Chess Olympiad in Tel Aviv (+8 –2 =7);
- In 1966, at second reserve board in 17th Chess Olympiad in Havana (+1 –0 =1);
- In 1980, at fourth board in 24th Chess Olympiad in La Valletta (+1 –1 =5);
- In 1984, at fourth board in 26th Chess Olympiad in Thessaloniki (+1 –0 =2).

He won individual silver medal at Leipzig 1960.

Schweber was awarded the International Master (IM) title in 1961.

Schweber died on 1 January 2017 at the age of 80.
