= Oberkapfenberg Castle =

Castle in Styria, Austria

Burg Oberkapfenberg
- Kapfenberg
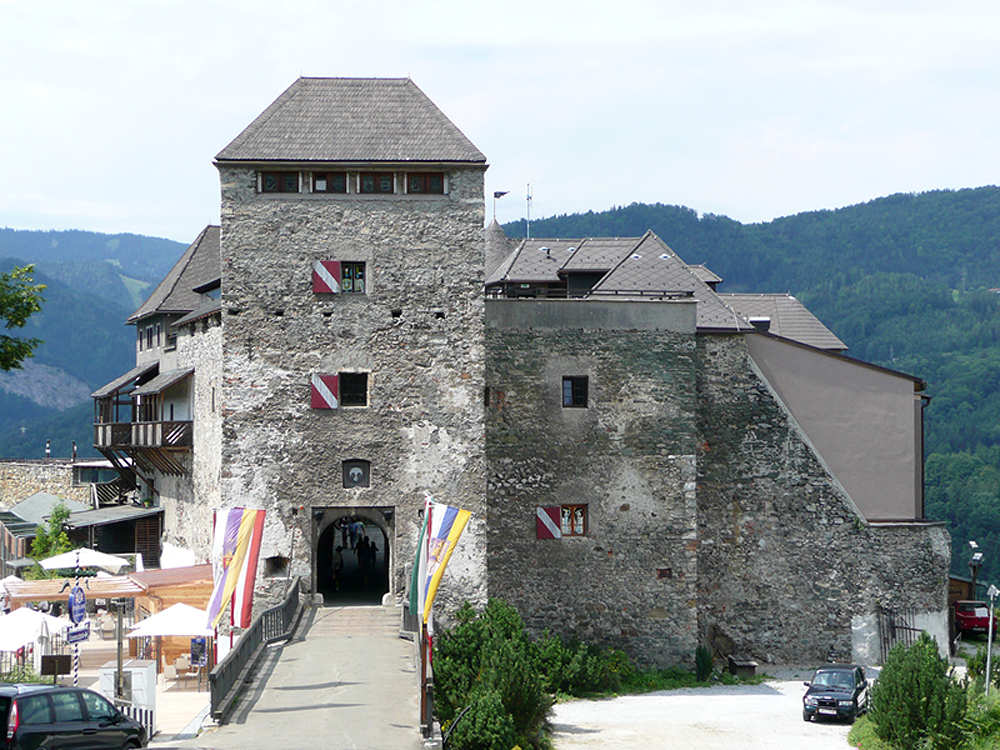
- Oberkapfenberg Castle – front view

Site information
- Type: hill castle
- Code: AT-6
- Condition: preserved or largely preserved

Location
- Coordinates: 47°26′24.09″N 15°17′36.85″E
- Height: Height missing, see template documentation

Site history
- Built: first mentioned in 1173

Oberkapfenberg Castle (German: Burg Oberkapfenberg) is a hilltop castle in Kapfenberg, Styria, Austria. It stands above the town on the Schlossberg, overlooking the Mürz valley, at an elevation of about 592 metres (1,942 ft) above sea level. The castle is one of Kapfenberg’s best-known landmarks and is used today as a museum, event venue and tourist attraction.

A castle named Chaffenberch was first mentioned in 1173. The present castle complex was built in the late 13th century by the Lords of Stubenberg, who used it as a residence and administrative centre. Around 1550, the castle was rebuilt in Renaissance style.

After the Stubenberg family moved its residence in 1739, the castle was abandoned and gradually fell into ruin. In 1955, Count Stubenberg began rebuilding the castle within the old walls and adapting it as a castle hotel. In 1992, the municipality of Kapfenberg acquired the property.

The castle now contains exhibition rooms, event spaces and a falconry. Visitors can take part in guided tours, medieval-themed activities and birds-of-prey demonstrations. It also hosts the annual Ritterfest, a medieval festival featuring knight displays, music, theatre, craft markets and falconry shows.

== See also ==
- List of castles in Austria
