= Nurten Yılmaz =

Austrian politician (born 1957)

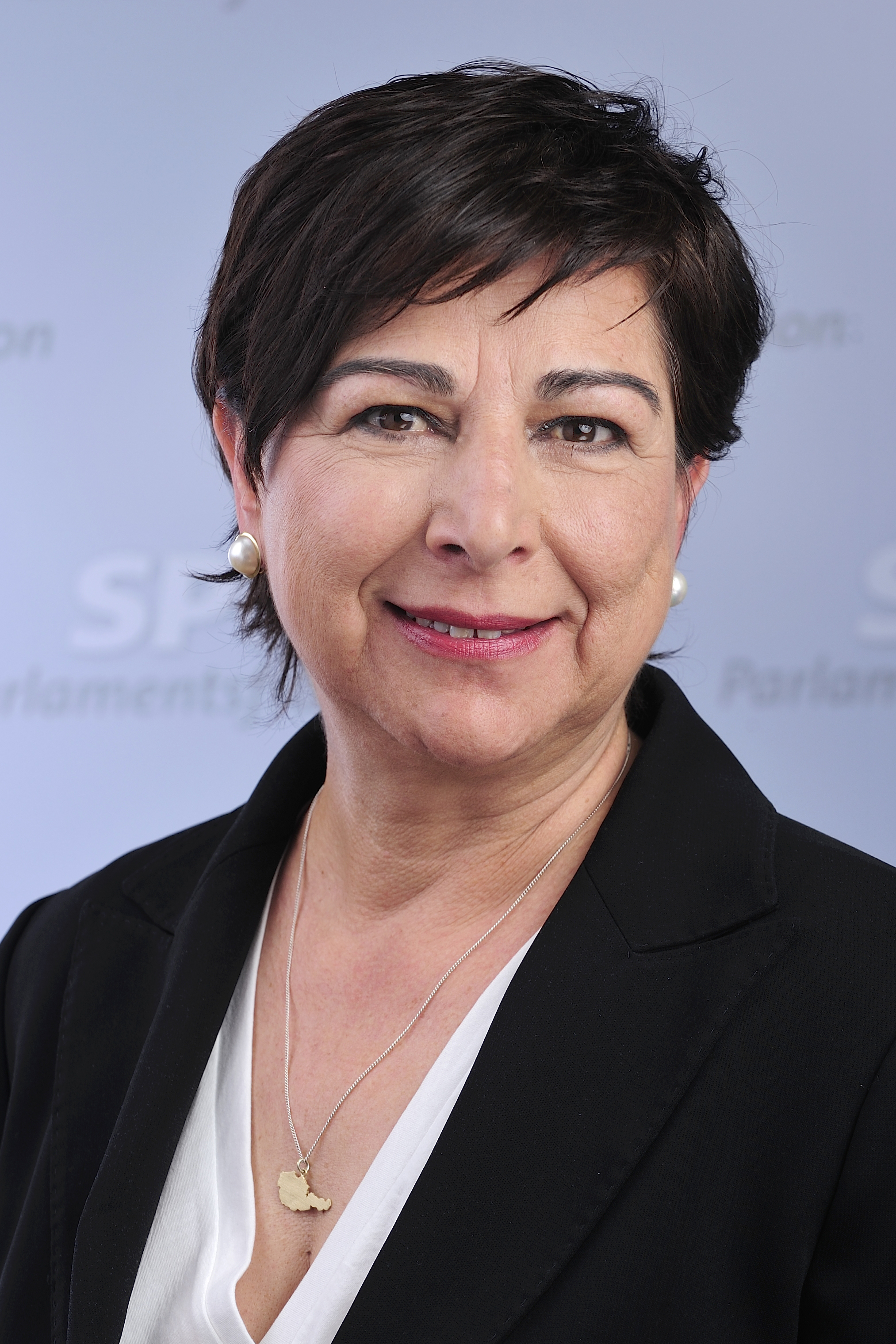
- Yılmaz in April 2014

Member of the National Council
- In office 29 October 2013 – 14 December 2022
- Succeeded by: Christian Oxonitsch
- Constituency: Vienna North West

Member of the Municipal Council and Landtag of Vienna
- In office 30 April 2001 – 28 October 2013

Personal details
- Born: Nurten Erdost; 17 September 1957 (age 68) Söke, Turkey
- Party: Social Democratic Party

Nurten Yılmaz (née Erdost; born 17 September 1957) is an Austrian politician and former member of the National Council. A member of the Social Democratic Party, she represented Vienna North West from October 2013 to December 2022. She was a member of the Municipal Council and Landtag of Vienna from April 2001 to October 2013.

Yılmaz was born on 17 September 1957 in Söke, Turkey. She and her family migrated to Austria in 1966. She studied at an electrical engineering technical college (HTL) in Favoriten, graduating in 1977. She worked in the statistical department of the Vienna Regional Health Insurance Fund until 1990. She then worked for the Social Democratic Party (SPÖ)'s Federal Women's Secretariat (Bundesfrauensekretariat) from 1992 to 1997. Later she worked for Austrian Friends of Children, an organisation affiliated with the SPÖ.

Yılmaz has been active in the SPÖ and its youth wing Socialist Youth Austria since she was a teenager and joined the party in 1981. She was a member of the district council (Bezirksvertretung) in Ottakring from January 1999 to April 2001 and had responsibility for children and youth issues. She was a member of the Municipal Council and Landtag of Vienna from April 2001 to October 2013. She was elected to the National Council in the 2013 legislative election. She retired from politics in December 2022 and was replaced by Christian Oxonitsch in the National Council.

Yılmaz is a co-founder of the Women's Initiative for Bicultural Marriages and Cohabitation (Frauen Initiative Bikulturelle Ehen und Lebensgemeinschaften) and a board member of the Austrian-Turkish Friendship Association (Österreichisch Türkische Freundschaft). She has two daughters.

Electoral history of Nurten Yılmaz
| Election | Electoral district | Party | Votes | % | Result |
|---|---|---|---|---|---|
| 1999 legislative | Vienna | Social Democratic Party | 20 | 0.01% | Not elected |
| 1999 legislative | Federal List | Social Democratic Party | - | - | Not elected |
| 2002 legislative | Vienna North West | Social Democratic Party | 1,038 | 2.08% | Not elected |
| 2002 legislative | Vienna | Social Democratic Party | 427 | 0.11% | Not elected |
| 2002 legislative | Federal List | Social Democratic Party | - | - | Not elected |
| 2006 legislative | Vienna North West | Social Democratic Party | 1,719 | 3.88% | Not elected |
| 2006 legislative | Vienna | Social Democratic Party | 1,081 | 0.33% | Not elected |
| 2006 legislative | Federal List | Social Democratic Party | - | - | Not elected |
| 2008 legislative | Vienna North West | Social Democratic Party | 1,992 | 5.13% | Not elected |
| 2008 legislative | Vienna | Social Democratic Party | 613 | 0.21% | Not elected |
| 2008 legislative | Federal List | Social Democratic Party | - | - | Not elected |
| 2013 legislative | Vienna North West | Social Democratic Party | 2,128 | 6.63% | Elected |
| 2013 legislative | Vienna | Social Democratic Party | 634 | 0.25% | Not elected |
| 2013 legislative | Federal List | Social Democratic Party | 706 | 0.06% | Not elected |
| 2017 legislative | Vienna North West | Social Democratic Party | 3,093 | 7.31% | Elected |
| 2017 legislative | Vienna | Social Democratic Party | 728 | 0.24% | Not elected |
| 2017 legislative | Federal List | Social Democratic Party | 407 | 0.03% | Not elected |
| 2019 legislative | Vienna North West | Social Democratic Party | 2,354 | 7.68% | Elected |
| 2019 legislative | Vienna | Social Democratic Party | 596 | 0.27% | Not elected |
| 2019 legislative | Federal List | Social Democratic Party | 405 | 0.04% | Not elected |
