= Melitta Breznik =

Austrian writer

- Born: 1961 (age 64–65); Kapfenberg, Austria
- Occupations: Medical doctor, writer

Melitta Breznik (born 1961 in Kapfenberg) is a senior doctor, specializing in psychiatry and a writer of novels and short stories. She was born in southern Austria, though most of her professional life has been spent in Switzerland.

Melitta Breznik studied medicine in Graz and Innsbruck which is where she obtained her doctorate. She was a senior doctor at the Psychiatric Clinic in Cazis (south of Chur), at the Private Psychiatric Clinic at the Zürichberg and at the Hohenegg Psychiatric Clinic in Meilen. Between 2004 and 2009 she had her own medical business focused on psychiatry and psychotherapy at Chur. Most recently she headed up the Anthroposophic Psychosomatic Rehabilitation Clinic at Badenweiler on the south-western tip of Germany.

Melitta Breznik in the author of novels and short stories, which are influenced by family and professional experience of psychiatry and which have been critically praised for their precise style.

== Recognition ==
- 1996 Kunstpreis der Stadt Innsbruck (Artistic prize from the City of Innsbruck) 3rd Prize for narrative poetry
- 2001 Literaturpreis des Landes Steiermark (Literature Prize from the State of Styria)
- 2002 Werkbeitrag of the Pro Helvetia foundation

== Published output ==
- Nachtdienst. Luchterhand, Munich 1995, ISBN 3-630-86931-9
- Figuren. Luchterhand, Munich 1999, ISBN 3-630-86993-9
- Das Umstellformat. Luchterhand, Munich 2002, ISBN 3-630-87128-3
- Nordlicht. Luchterhand, Munich 2009, ISBN 978-3-630-87287-2
- Der Sommer hat lange auf sich warten lassen. Luchterhand, Munich 2013, ISBN 978-3-630-87398-5
