= Maria Rauch-Kallat =

Austrian politician

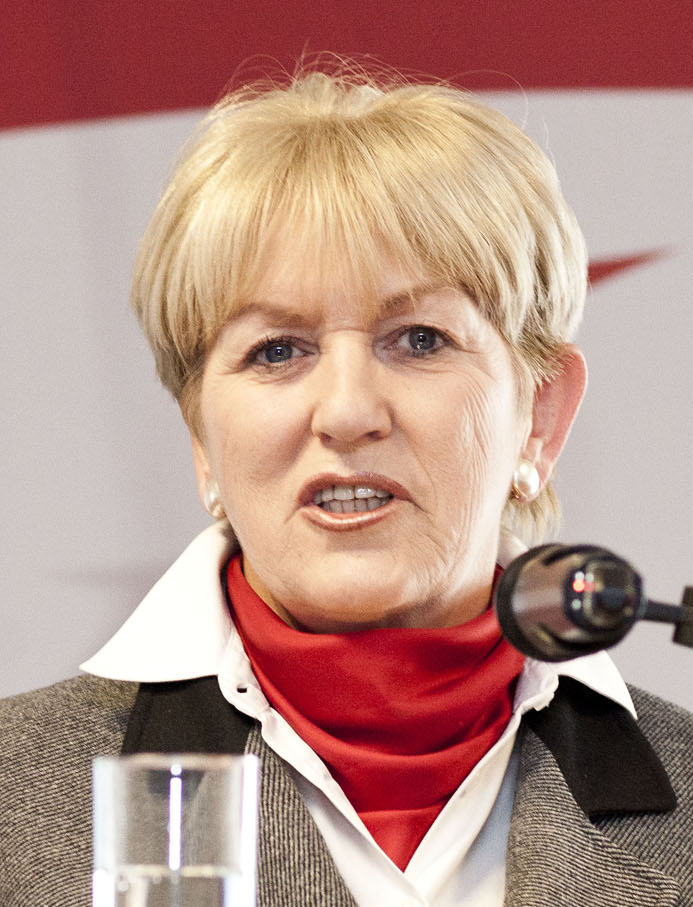

President of Austrian Paralympic Committee
- Incumbent
- Assumed office 2009

Federal Minister for Health and Women
- In office March 2003 – January 2007

Personal details
- Born: 31 January 1949 (age 77) Währing, Vienna
- Party: Austrian People's Party (ÖVP)
- Spouse: Alfons Mensdorff-Pouilly
- Children: 2 daughters (born 1970 and 1973)
- Education: University of Vienna

Maria Rauch-Kallat is a former Austrian People's Party (ÖVP) politician who served as Minister of Health and Women from 2003 to 2007 in the Austrian government. She is currently a management consultant.

== Political career ==
She entered politics in 1983 as a member of the Austrian Senate until 1987, when she became a member of the City Council of Vienna.

In 1992 – 1994 she served as Federal Minister for Environment, Youth, and Family under Chancellor Franz Vranitzky's third cabinet (or Vranitzky Cabinet III), succeeding Ruth Feldgrill-Zankel. She also became Deputy President of the ÖVP-Vienna, a position she held until 2000, and served as Secretary General of the ÖVP-Austria from 1995 until 2003. Under Vranitzky Cabinet IV, which began on November 29, 1994, she served as the Federal Minister for Environment until 1995.

She served as a member of the Austrian Parliament for three stints—from 1995 until 1999, from 2001 until 2003, and from 2006 until 2008. She served as Federal Minister for Health and Women from 2003 until January 2007 under Chancellor Wolfgang Schüssel.

== Affiliations ==
Rauch-Kallat has been the President of the Austrian Paralympic Committee (NPC) since 2009 after serving as NPC Vice President.
