= World Chess Championship 1963 =

Chess match between Mikhail Botvinnik and Tigran Petrosian

	Defending champion	Challenger
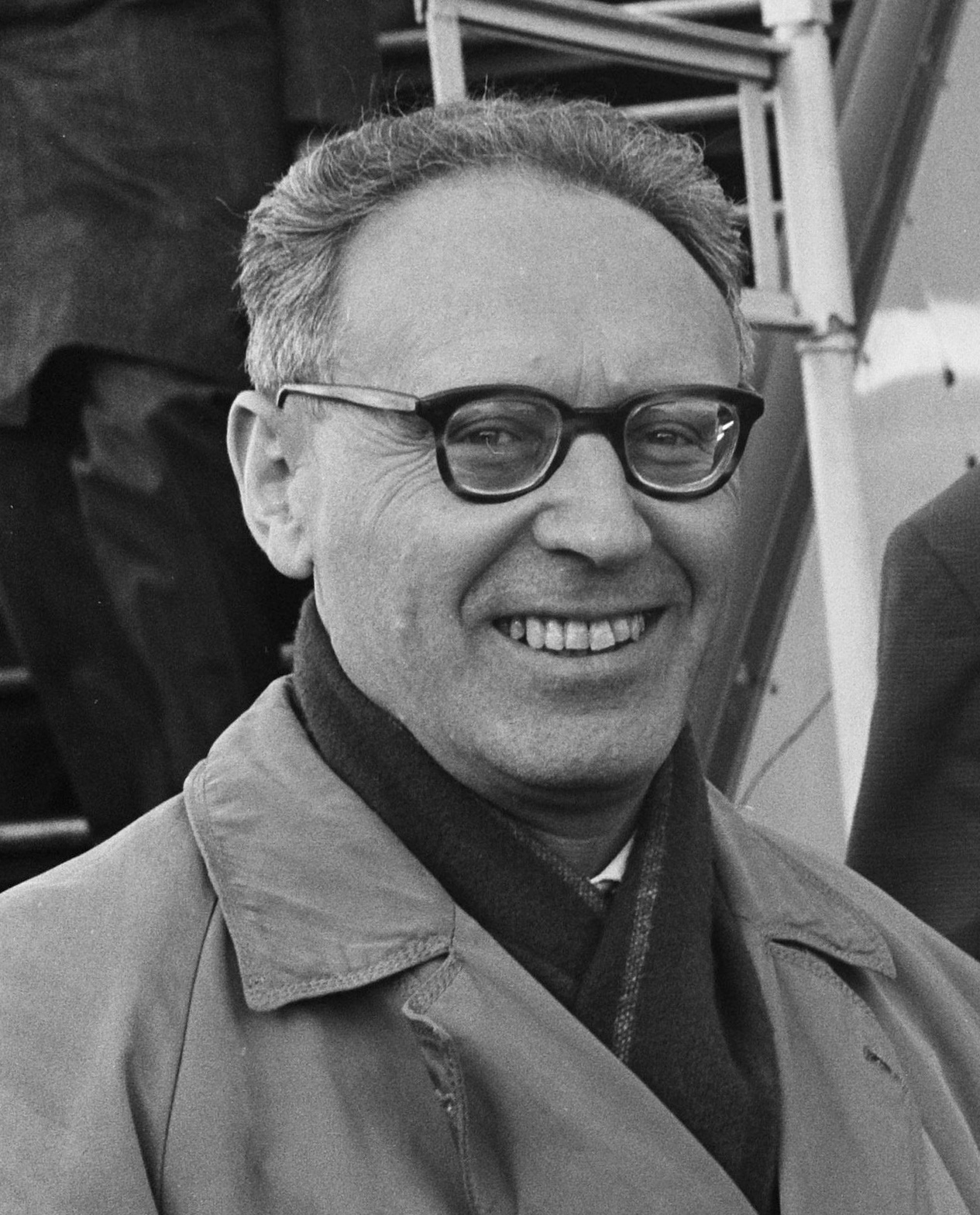
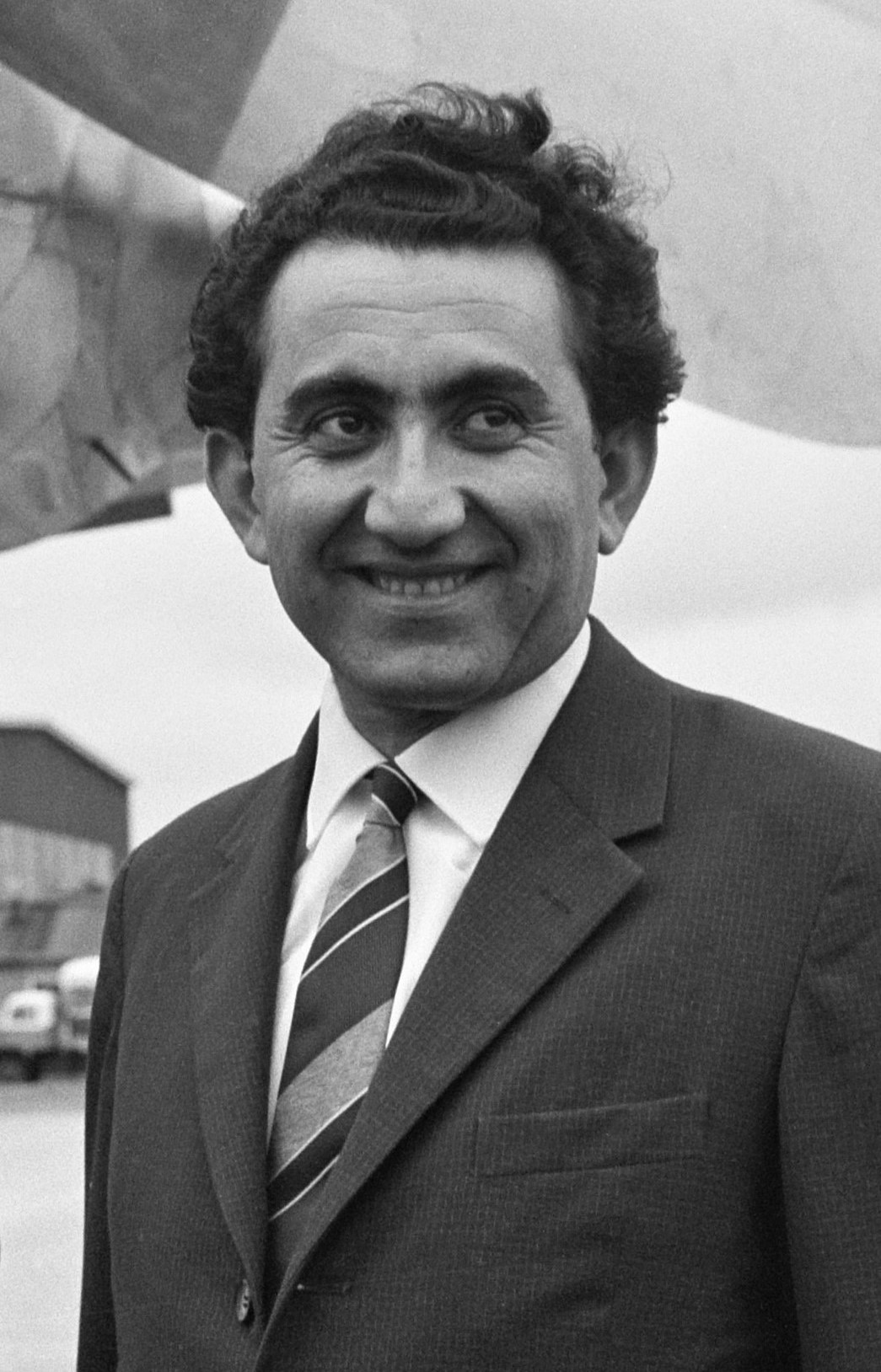
	Mikhail Botvinnik	Tigran Petrosian
	(Soviet Union) Mikhail Botvinnik	(Soviet Union) Tigran Petrosian
9½	Scores	12½
	Born 17 August 1911; 51 years old	Born 17 June 1929; 33 years old
	Winner of the 1961 World Chess Championship	Winner of the 1962 Candidates Tournament

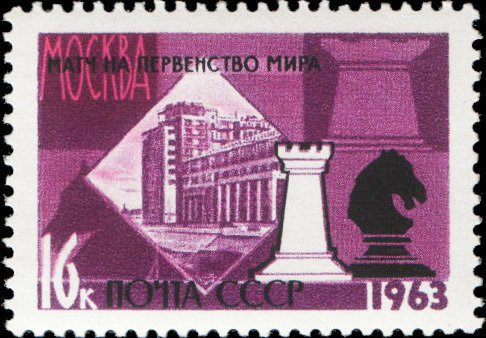
A Soviet stamp dedicated to the World Chess Championship 1963

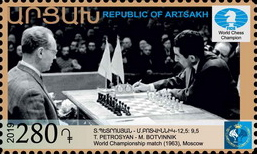
A 2019 stamp of Artsakh featuring the championship match between Botvinnik and Petrosian

At the World Chess Championship 1963, Tigran Petrosian narrowly qualified to challenge Mikhail Botvinnik for the World Chess Championship, and then won the match to become the ninth World Chess Champion. The cycle is particularly remembered for the controversy surrounding the Candidates' Tournament at Curaçao in 1962, which resulted in FIDE changing the format of the Candidates Tournament to a series of knockout matches.

== Structure ==
The world championship cycle was under the jurisdiction of FIDE, the World Chess Federation, which set the structure for the fifth world championship series at the 1959 FIDE Congress in Luxembourg. The cycle began with the zonal tournaments of 1960. The top finishers in the zonals met at the Interzonal, with the top six players from the Interzonal qualifying for the Candidates' Tournament. They were then joined by Mikhail Tal (loser of the last World Championship match in 1961) and Paul Keres (runner-up at the 1959 Candidates) in the eight player Candidates Tournament in 1962. The winner of the Candidates would qualify to play a World Championship match against Mikhail Botvinnik, the incumbent champion, in 1963.

== Zonal tournaments ==
FIDE now had more than fifty member Federations that were divided into nine zones: 1–Western Europe, 2–Central Europe, 3–Eastern Europe, 4–USSR, 5–USA, 6–Canada, 7–Central America, 8–South America, and 9–Asia. Previous championship cycles had used only eight zones. Each zone was allocated from one to four qualifiers based on the relative strengths of its leading players.

=== Zone 1 (Western Europe) ===
The Zonal was held at Madrid, with Jan Hein Donner (Netherlands), Svetozar Gligorić (Yugoslavia), Arturo Pomar (Spain), and Lajos Portisch (Hungary) in a four-way tie for first place with 10½/15. A Madrid playoff qualified Gligorić, Pomar, and Portisch.

=== Zone 2 (Central Europe) ===
The Zonal was allocated to Berg en Dal, Netherlands. Due to Cold War political tension, Wolfgang Uhlmann (East Germany) was refused a visa, causing the players from Bulgaria, Czechoslovakia, Hungary, Poland, and Yugoslavia to withdraw. The winners of the diminished tournament were Friðrik Ólafsson (Iceland) first with 7½/9 and Andreas Dückstein (Austria) and Rudolf Teschner (West Germany) tied for second with 7. The Zonal tournament was replayed in the summer of 1961 at Mariánské Lázně, Czechoslovakia, with Ólafsson, Miroslav Filip (Czechoslovakia), and Uhlmann qualifying. At its 1961 Congress at Sofia, FIDE decided that Dückstein and Teschner would be allowed to play a match for a place in the Interzonal. With the match tied 3–3, Dückstein withdrew giving the final qualifying spot to Teschner.

=== Zone 3 (Eastern Europe) ===
The Zonal was held in Budapest, with Gedeon Barcza (Hungary) finishing first with 10½/15, followed by Mario Bertok (Yugoslavia), István Bilek (Hungary), Aleksandar Matanović (Yugoslavia), and Theo van Scheltinga tied for second at 10. A playoff between the second-place finishers at Berg en Dal ended with Bilek 3½, Bertok and Matanović 3, von Scheltinga 2½. An artificial tie-break selected Bertok over Matanović, resulting in Barcza, Bilek, and Bertok qualifying for the Interzonal.

=== Zone 4 (USSR) ===
Even though FIDE allocated the USSR four qualifying spots, Zone 4 was the hardest zone from which to qualify. An early 1961 USSR Championship was held as the Zonal tournament. Tigran Petrosian won the championship with 13½/19, and the remaining qualifiers were Victor Korchnoi with 13 and Efim Geller and Leonid Stein with 12. Notable players who failed to qualify from this zone were former world champion Vasily Smyslov at 11, former world champion challenger David Bronstein at 9, and former Candidates Boris Spassky at 11, Yuri Averbakh at 10½, Mark Taimanov at 10, and Isaac Boleslavsky at 9. The USSR Federation tried unsuccessfully at the 1961 FIDE Congress to get Smyslov seeded into the Interzonal.

=== Zone 5 (USA) ===
The United States Chess Federation designated the 1960 U.S. Championship as the Zonal tournament. Top finishers in the championship were Bobby Fischer with 9/11, William Lombardy with 7, Raymond Weinstein with 6½, and Arthur Bisguier, Samuel Reshevsky, and James Sherwin with 6. Zone 5 was allotted three players, but the lack of true chess professionals in America aside from Fischer greatly affected the players the U.S. sent to the Interzonal. Lombardy was too busy to play as he was in seminary, and Weinstein was also busy with college studies. Reshevsky declined a spot in the Interzonal, and Sherwin could not get enough time off work to participate. Fischer and Bisguier won the first two spots, and Pal Benko was nominated to fill the final position.

=== Zone 6 (Canada) ===
Daniel Yanofsky, a former Canadian champion and British champion was nominated for the one qualifying spot allotted.

=== Zone 7 (Central America) ===
Zone 7 comprised Central America along with northern parts of South America. Miguel Cuéllar (Colombia) qualified from the Caracas Zonal.

=== Zone 8 (South America) ===
The top finishers at the São Paulo Zonal were Julio Bolbochán (Argentina) first with 13½/17, Samuel Schweber (Argentina) second with 13, and Eugênio German (Brazil), Rodrigo Flores (Chile), and Bernardo Wexler tied for third with 11½. After a playoff for third place, the qualifiers were Bolbochán, Schweber, and German.

=== Zone 9 (Asia) ===
Zone 9 included Asia (except the USSR) and the Pacific, and was divided into two subzones. The Southeast Asia and Pacific subzonal tournament was held in Sydney, with C. J. S. Purdy winning. As the West and Central Asia subzonal tournament at Madras had only two players, it was decided in match play. Manuel Aaron (India) beat Sürengiin Möömöö (Mongolia) 3–1. Aaron qualified by beating Purdy 3–0 in the Zonal final match also held at Madras.

== Interzonal ==
The fifth Interzonal was planned for the Netherlands in 1961, but the sponsors could not guarantee that visas could be obtained for all participants. Subsequently, efforts were made to play in Moscow, and then Madrid, but these arrangements also fell through. Finally the Interzonal was played in Stockholm under the direct sponsorship of FIDE, from 26 January to 8 March 1962. The 23-player single round-robin tournament was won convincingly by 18-year-old American Bobby Fischer, with 17½ points out of 22 (13 wins, 9 draws, no losses), a margin of 2½ points. The next four places were taken by the Soviets Tigran Petrosian and Efim Geller with 15 points each, and the Soviet Victor Korchnoi and the Czechoslovak Miroslav Filip with 14 points each.

For the sixth and final qualifying spot there was a three-way tie at 13½ points. Leonid Stein (USSR), Pal Benko (USA), and Svetozar Gligorić (Yugoslavia) played a double round-robin playoff tournament which was dominated by Stein and Benko. Although Stein won, a rule adopted in 1959 allowed no more than three players from a single Federation to qualify from the Interzonal. Stein could play in the Candidates only if one of the other qualifiers from the USSR (Geller, Petrosian, or Korchnoi) was unable to participate. With Stein excluded, Benko took the final place in the Candidates Tournament.

=== Crosstables ===
Players in bold advanced to the Candidates' Tournament, along with seeded players Mikhail Tal and Paul Keres.

5th Interzonal, Stockholm 1962
		1	2	3	4	5	6	7	8	9	10	11	12	13	14	15	16	17	18	19	20	21	22	23	W	D	L	Total	Place
1	**Bobby Fischer** (USA)	–	½	½	1	½	½	½	½	½	1	½	1	1	1	1	1	1	1	1	1	½	1	1	13	9	0	**17½**	**1**
2	**Efim Geller** (USSR)	½	–	½	½	½	½	1	1	1	1	0	½	1	½	1	1	1	½	½	½	1	0	1	10	10	2	**15**	**2–3**
03	**Tigran Petrosian** (USSR)	½	½	–	½	½	½	½	½	½	½	1	1	½	½	1	½	½	1	1	1	1	½	1	8	14	0	**15**	**2–3**
04	**Viktor Korchnoi** (USSR)	0	½	½	–	1	½	½	½	½	0	1	1	½	1	1	½	½	1	½	1	1	0	1	9	10	3	**14**	**4–5**
05	**Miroslav Filip** (TCH)	½	½	½	0	–	½	½	1	0	½	½	½	1	1	½	½	1	½	1	½	1	1	1	8	12	2	**14**	**4–5**
06	Svetozar Gligorić (YUG)	½	½	½	½	½	–	½	0	½	½	½	1	½	1	0	1	1	½	½	1	½	1	1	7	13	2	13½	6–8
07	**Pal Benko** (USA)	½	0	½	½	½	½	–	½	1	½	½	0	½	½	1	1	0	1	1	1	½	1	1	8	11	3	**13½**	**6–8**
08	Leonid Stein (USSR)	½	0	½	½	0	1	½	–	0	1	½	0	1	½	½	1	1	½	½	1	1	1	1	9	9	4	13½	6–8
09	Wolfgang Uhlmann (GDR)	½	0	½	½	1	½	0	1	–	0	1	1	½	0	1	1	0	1	1	1	0	1	0	10	5	7	12½	9–10
10	Lajos Portisch (HUN)	0	0	½	1	½	½	½	0	1	–	½	½	½	½	½	1	1	1	0	1	1	1	0	8	9	5	12½	9–10
11	Arturo Pomar (ESP)	½	1	0	0	½	½	½	½	0	½	–	½	0	0	1	½	1	½	1	½	1	1	1	7	10	5	12	11–12
12	Friðrik Ólafsson (ISL)	0	½	0	0	½	0	1	1	0	½	½	–	½	0	½	½	½	1	1	1	1	1	1	8	8	6	12	11–12
13	Julio Bolbochán (ARG)	0	0	½	½	0	½	½	0	½	½	1	½	–	½	½	½	1	½	1	½	½	1	1	5	13	4	11½	13
14	Gedeon Barcza (HUN)	0	½	½	0	0	0	½	½	1	½	1	1	½	–	½	½	½	½	½	½	1	0	1	5	12	5	11	14–15
15	István Bilek (HUN)	0	0	0	0	½	1	0	½	0	½	0	½	½	½	–	½	1	½	1	1	1	1	1	7	8	7	11	14–15
16	Arthur Bisguier (USA)	0	0	½	½	½	0	0	0	0	0	½	½	½	½	½	–	½	½	1	½	1	1	1	4	11	7	9½	16
17	Daniel Yanofsky (CAN)	0	0	½	½	0	0	1	0	1	0	0	½	0	½	0	½	–	½	1	½	½	0	½	3	9	10	7½	17–18
18	Mario Bertok (YUG)	0	½	0	0	½	½	0	½	0	0	½	0	½	½	½	½	½	–	½	0	½	1	½	1	13	8	7½	17–18
19	Eugênio German (BRA)	0	½	0	½	0	½	0	½	0	1	0	0	0	½	0	0	0	½	–	½	½	1	1	3	8	11	7	19–20
20	Samuel Schweber (ARG)	0	½	0	0	½	0	0	0	0	0	½	0	½	½	0	½	½	1	½	–	1	½	½	2	10	10	7	19–20
21	Rudolf Teschner (FRG)	½	0	0	0	0	½	½	0	1	0	0	0	½	0	0	0	½	½	½	0	–	1	1	3	7	12	6½	21
22	Miguel Cuéllar (COL)	0	1	½	1	0	0	0	0	0	0	0	0	0	1	0	0	1	0	0	½	0	–	½	4	3	15	5½	22
23	Manuel Aaron (IND)	0	0	0	0	0	0	0	0	1	1	0	0	0	0	0	0	½	½	0	½	0	½	–	2	4	16	4	23

1962 Stockholm play-off
		1	2	3	Total
1	Leonid Stein (USSR)	x x	½ ½	1 1	3/4
2	**Pal Benko** (USA)	½ ½	x x	1 –	**2/3**
3	Svetozar Gligorić (YUG)	0 0	0 –	x x	0/3

== Candidates Tournament ==
The Candidates Tournament was played as an eight-player, quadruple round-robin tournament in Curaçao in 1962. The field was largely the same as at the 1959 Candidates Tournament in Yugoslavia, with Mikhail Tal (USSR), Paul Keres (USSR), Tigran Petrosian (USSR), Bobby Fischer (USA), and Pal Benko (USA) as the five returning players. The three new players were Efim Geller (USSR), Miroslav Filip (Czechoslovakia), and Viktor Korchnoi (USSR), in place of former champion Vasily Smyslov (USSR), Svetozar Gligorić (Yugoslavia), and Friðrik Ólafsson (Iceland). Only Korchnoi was really new to this level of competition, as Geller was a candidate at Zürich in 1953 and Filip at Amsterdam in 1956.

=== Pre-tournament predictions ===
The favourites were Tal (the recently dethroned World Champion) and Fischer, based on his powerful Interzonal showing. Botvinnik also picked Tal, as did a poll of Russian readers, narrowly ahead of Fischer. Former world champion Max Euwe picked Petrosian. Keres said Fischer deserved to be favourite but had faith that a Soviet player would win; and similarly Alexander Kotov and Svetozar Gligorić thought one of the Soviets would win ahead of Fischer.

American magazine Chess Life picked Fischer ahead of Tal. Of the others it said: Petrosian had a reputation of drawing many games, and it was unclear if his tendency to split points might prevent him from reaching the championship; Keres at age 46 was the oldest player, and it was thought by some that this might be his last shot at the championship title; Korchnoi and Geller had very imaginative and adventurous styles, which often got them into trouble and led to erratic results; Filip had been ill and had not played many major events between 1958 and 1960, and had the reputation as a solid player who scored many draws; and Benko was not a full-time professional chess player (he worked as an investment broker in New York) which limited his opportunities to play against grandmaster-strength opposition, and he had a tendency to get into time trouble.

=== Results ===
The pre-tournament favorites were Tal and Fischer, but Tal lost his first three games and Fischer lost his first two games, indicating an unpredictable tournament could be unfolding. Tal was in bad health, withdrew due after the third of four cycles, and was hospitalized.

Korchnoi took the early lead, scoring 5/7 in the first cycle, ahead of Petrosian, Geller and Keres with 4 points. But in the twelfth round, Korchnoi blundered against Fischer in a winning position and lost, and soon after lost four games in a row. The tournament became a three-way race between Petrosian, Keres and Geller. After three full cycles (21 rounds), Keres led on 14½, narrowly ahead of Petrosian and Geller on 14, with the others out of contention (Korchnoi 11, Fischer 10, Benko 9, Tal 7, Filip 4½).

At the start of the fourth and final cycle, Geller lost to Fischer while Petrosian defeated Korchnoi, effectively giving Keres and Petrosian a one-point lead over Geller. The three leaders drew all their games in the next four rounds. With two rounds remaining, Petrosian and Keres shared the lead on 16½ and two games to play, while Geller was on 16 with only one game to play.

In the penultimate round, Petrosian drew with Fischer, and Geller had the bye. Keres, who had won his previous three games against Benko, unexpectedly lost to Benko, giving Petrosian a half point lead (Petrosian 17, Keres 16½, Geller 16).

In the last round, Petrosian made a short draw with white against Filip. Keres had white against Fischer but could only draw, meaning Petrosian was the winner. Petrosian drew his last five games of the tournament. Geller won his last game, against Benko, to finish equal second with Keres.

5th Candidates, Curaçao 1962
		PET	KER	GEL	FIS	KOR	BEN	TAL	FIL	Total
1	Tigran Petrosian (USSR)	–	½½½½	½½½½	½1½½	½½11	½½1½	11½−	½11½	17½
2=	Paul Keres (USSR)	½½½½	–	½½½½	0½1½	½½1½	1110	1½1−	½11½	17
2=	Efim Geller (USSR)	½½½½	½½½½	–	11½0	½½1½	½½½1	½11−	½11½	17
4	Bobby Fischer (USA)	½0½½	1½0½	00½1	–	010½	01½1	½1½−	1½1½	14
5	Viktor Korchnoi (USSR)	½½00	½½0½	½½0½	101½	–	½½½0	10½−	1111	13½
6	Pal Benko (USA)	½½0½	0001	½½½0	10½0	½½½1	–	10½−	011½	12
7=	Mikhail Tal (USSR)	00½−	0½0−	½00−	½0½−	01½−	01½−	–	10½−	7
7=	Miroslav Filip (TCH)	½00½	½00½	½00½	0½0½	0000	100½	01½−	–	7

Since the championship rules provided an automatic berth into the next cycle's Candidates Tournament to the Candidates runner-up, Keres and Geller played a match to determine second place. Keres won the 1962 Moscow playoff match 4½–3½ to earn a seed into the 1965 Candidates. (However Geller ended up also being seeded into the 1965 Candidates anyway, after Botvinnik declined to participate.)

1962 Moscow play-off, Geller v. Keres
	1	2	3	4	5	6	7	8	Total
Efim Geller (USSR)	½	½	0	½	½	1	½	0	3½
Paul Keres (USSR)	½	½	1	½	½	0	½	1	4½

=== Allegations of collusion ===
Soon after the tournament, Fischer publicly alleged that the Soviets had colluded to prevent any non-Soviet – specifically him – from winning. His allegations were twofold: first, that Petrosian, Geller and Keres had pre-arranged to draw all their games (all twelve games between these players were drawn, in an average of 19 moves); and second, that Korchnoi had been part of the drawing pact in the first half of the tournament, and been instructed to lose some games to them in the second half. (In the first two cycles Korchnoi drew all his games with Petrosian, Geller and Keres; in the third cycle he lost to all of them; and in the final cycle he lost to Petrosian but drew with Keres and Geller).

The first allegation, of the drawing pact, is widely assumed to be correct. Yuri Averbakh, who was head of the Soviet team, said in a 2002 interview that it was in their interests to draw for reasons not related to Fischer. He said Keres was the oldest competitor and wanted to conserve energy, and that Petrosian and Geller were good friends with a history of drawing with each other.

The second allegation, of Korchnoi throwing games, is not widely accepted. Korchnoi defected from the USSR in 1976, and never alleged he was forced to throw games. Dominic Lawson calls the allegation "preposterous", noting that the main beneficiary of Korchnoi's losses was Petrosian, whom Korchnoi detested. Korchnoi supports the allegation of a drawing pact:

"This was perhaps the only time when the Soviet authorities did not intervene to determine any competition among the Soviets. On this occasion it was Petrosian personally who set up this controversy and he was helped by his friend, Geller. Keres was a wise man, but he was not cunning, he took the bait, while he could have refrained. The three players had privately agreed that they would draw all their games with each other. Tal and I were not included in this scheme. But in the end they colluded against Keres."

There are also allegations that, in the ultimately decisive Benko-Keres game in the penultimate round (which Benko won), Petrosian and Geller conspired against Keres by offering to help Benko. Benko wrote that Petrosian and Geller offered to help analyze the adjourned position, but that he refused the offer.

=== Response to allegations ===
FIDE, the world chess federation, responded to the allegations by changing the format of future Candidates' Tournaments. Beginning in the next (1966) cycle, the round-robin format was replaced by a series of elimination matches (initially best of 10 quarter-finals, best of 10 semi-finals, then a best of 12 final), to eliminate the possibility of collusion which exists in a round-robin tournament. Matches were used in all the subsequent Candidate Tournaments until the Candidates Tournament 2013, where it returned to the double round robin format.

== Championship match ==
As the winner of the Candidates, Petrosian challenged Botvinnik for the world championship. The match was best of 24, with Botvinnik to retain the title in the event of a 12–12 tie.

Petrosian lost the first game of the match, played on March 23, 1963, but recovered and won fairly comfortably, 12½–9½. Petrosian won five games, Botvinnik won two games, and there were fifteen draws. The final game, played on May 20, 1963, ended as a draw, giving Petrosian the required 12½ points needed to win the match.

1963 World Championship Match
	1	2	3	4	5	6	7	8	9	10	11	12	13	14	15	16	17	18	19	20	21	22	Total
Mikhail Botvinnik (USSR)	1	½	½	½	0	½	0	½	½	½	½	½	½	1	0	½	½	0	0	½	½	½	9½
Tigran Petrosian (USSR)	0	½	½	½	1	½	1	½	½	½	½	½	½	0	1	½	½	1	1	½	½	½	12½

=== Aftermath ===
The championship rules had been changed so that, unlike in 1957 and 1960, the defending champion was not entitled to a rematch. As the loser of the championship match, Botvinnik was still an automatic seed in the next Candidates Tournament. However, Botvinnik chose not to exercise this right and retired from championship play, although not from competitive chess altogether.

Petrosian went on to successfully defend his title in 1966, before losing the title to Boris Spassky in 1969.

== Cited sources ==
- Horowitz, Al (1973), The World Chess Championship, A History, Macmillan, LCCN 72080175
- Wade, R. G. (1964), The World Chess Championship 1963, Arco, LCCN 64514341
