= Austrian Paralympic Committee =

National Paralympic Committee of Austria

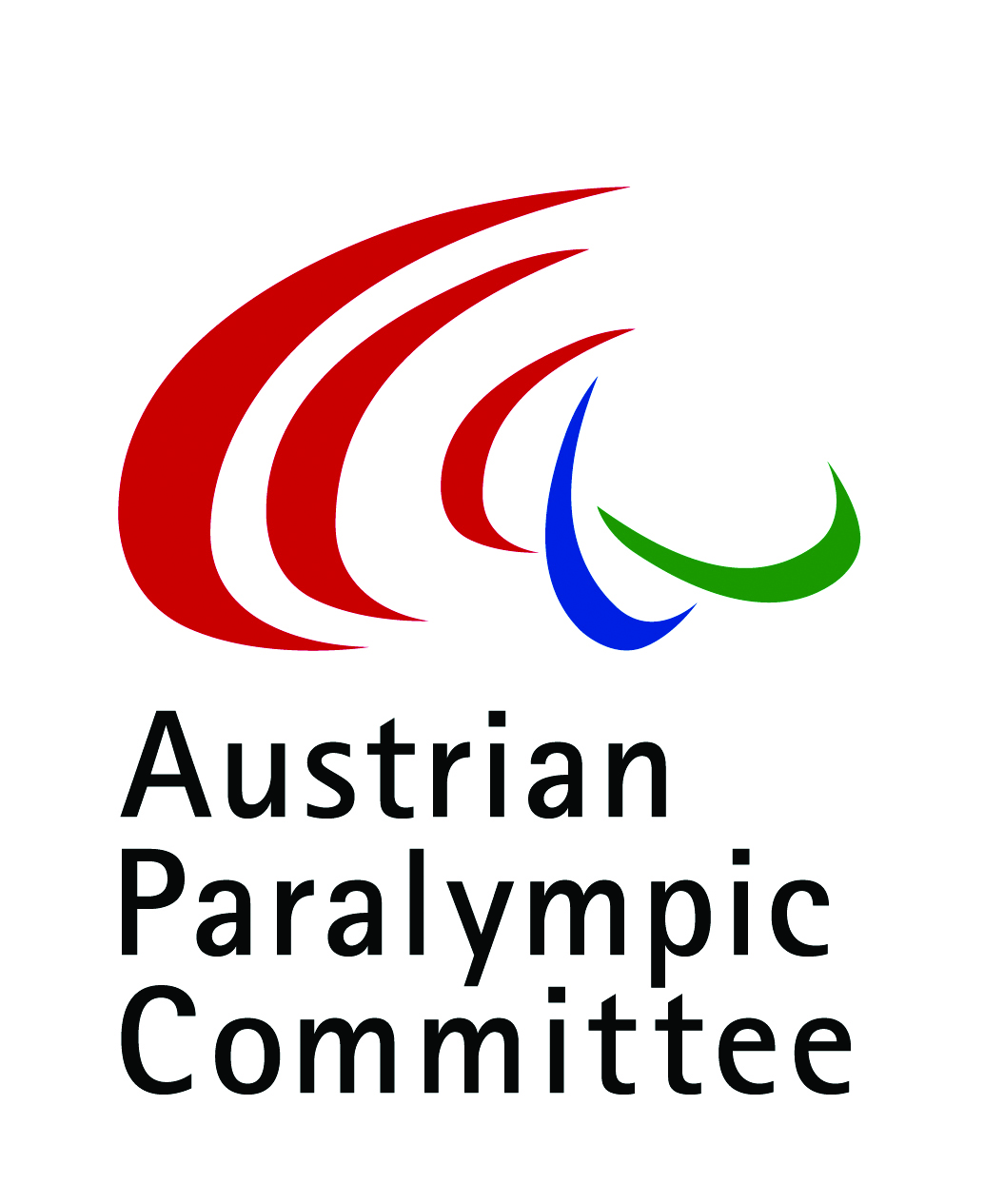

National Paralympic Committee
- Country: Austria
- Code: AUT
- Created: 1998
- Continental association: EPC
- Headquarters: Vienna, Austria
- President: Maria Rauch-Kallat
- Secretary General: Petra Huber
- Website: oepc.at

The Austrian Paralympic Committee (Austrian German: Österreichisches Paralympisches Committee, ÖPC or OEPC) was founded in 1998. In April 2009, Maria Rauch-Kallat, the former Austrian minister of health, youth and family and former NPC vice president, was elected president. One of her primary objectives is to support youth and women with disabilities. Petra Huber assumed the role of secretary general, while Hermann Krist and Brigitte Jank serve as vice-presidents.

The Austrian Paralympic Committee has its headquarters in Vienna.

== Tasks of the Austrian Paralympic Committee ==
The primary task of the Austrian Paralympic Committee is to enable qualified athletes with physical disabilities, visual impairment and mental impairment to compete in the Paralympics. The committee supports athletes by securing financial resources to send them to the Paralympics and coordinates their participation in collaboration with sports federations.

A key objective of the Austrian Paralympic Committee is to increase public and media interest in the Paralympic Games.

Additionally, the committee represents Austrian interests at conferences and meetings of the International Paralympic Committee and the European Paralympic Committee.

To date, Austrian athletes have won 214 gold, 232 silver and 232 bronze medals at the Paralympics (353 at the Summer Paralympics and 325 at the Winter Paralympics). The most successful female Austrian athlete at the Paralympics is Rosa Schweizer with 23 medals (including 16 gold medals) while the most successful male Austrian athlete is Engelbert Rangger with a total of 12 medals.

== See also ==
- Austria at the Paralympics
