= Andreas Ottenschläger =

Austrian politician (born 1975)

Member of the National Council
- Incumbent
- Assumed office 29 October 2013
- Constituency: Vienna (2013–2017); Vienna North West (2017–2024); Federal list (2024–present)

Personal details
- Born: 7 May 1975 (age 50)
- Party: People's Party

Andreas Ottenschläger (born 7 May 1975) is an Austrian politician of the People's Party. He has been a member of the National Council since 2013, and was a member of the district council of Josefstadt from 1996 to 2013.
