= Christian Oxonitsch =

Austrian politician (born 1961)

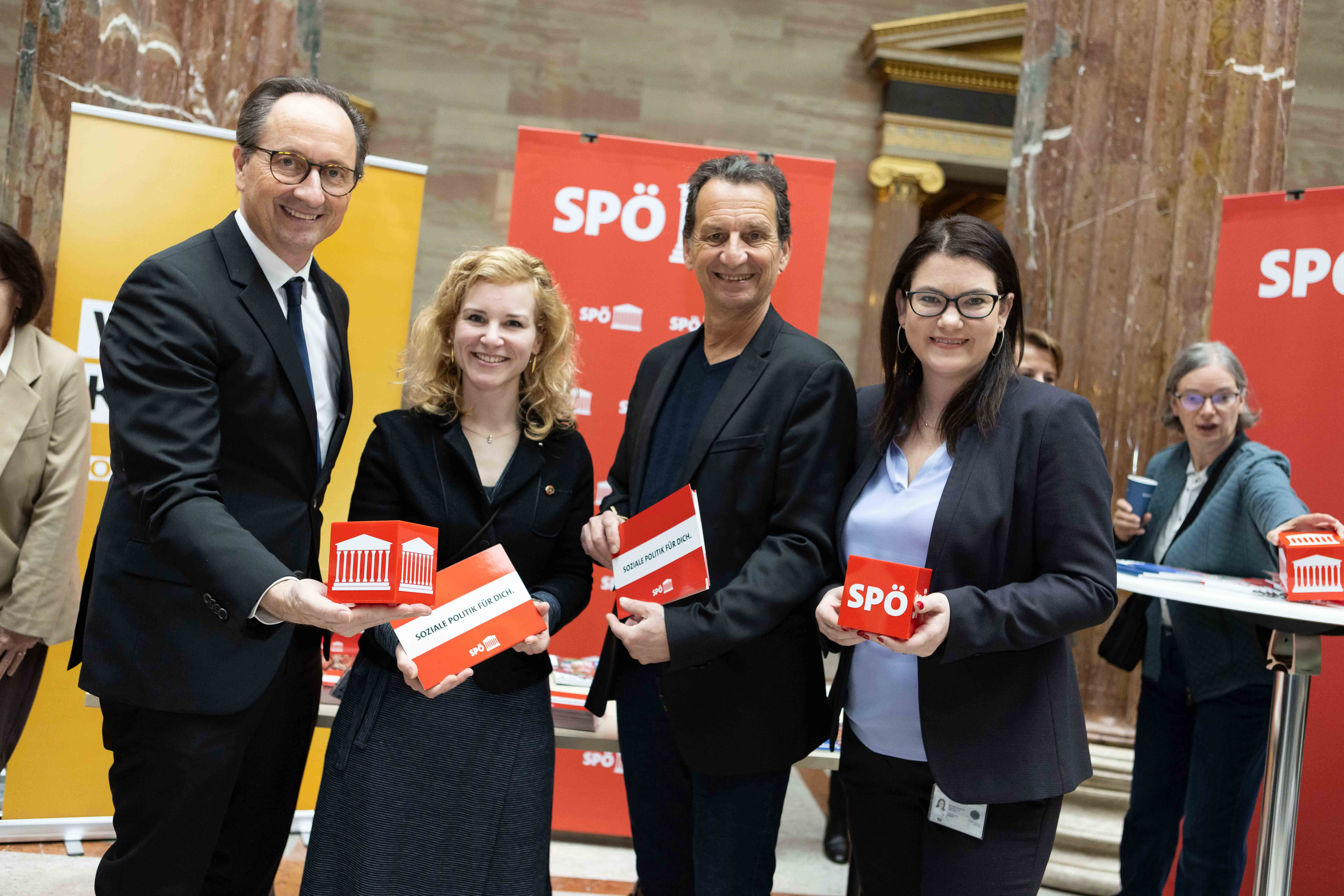
- Oxonitsch in 2023

Member of the National Council
- Incumbent
- Assumed office 15 December 2022
- Preceded by: Nurten Yılmaz
- Constituency: Vienna North West

Personal details
- Born: 21 December 1961 (age 64)
- Party: Social Democratic Party

Christian Oxonitsch (born 21 December 1961) is an Austrian politician of the Social Democratic Party serving as a member of the National Council since 2022. He was a member of the Municipal Council and Landtag of Vienna in 1996, from 1997 to 2009, and from 2015 to 2022.
