= Miroslav Filip =

Czech chess grandmaster (1928–2009)

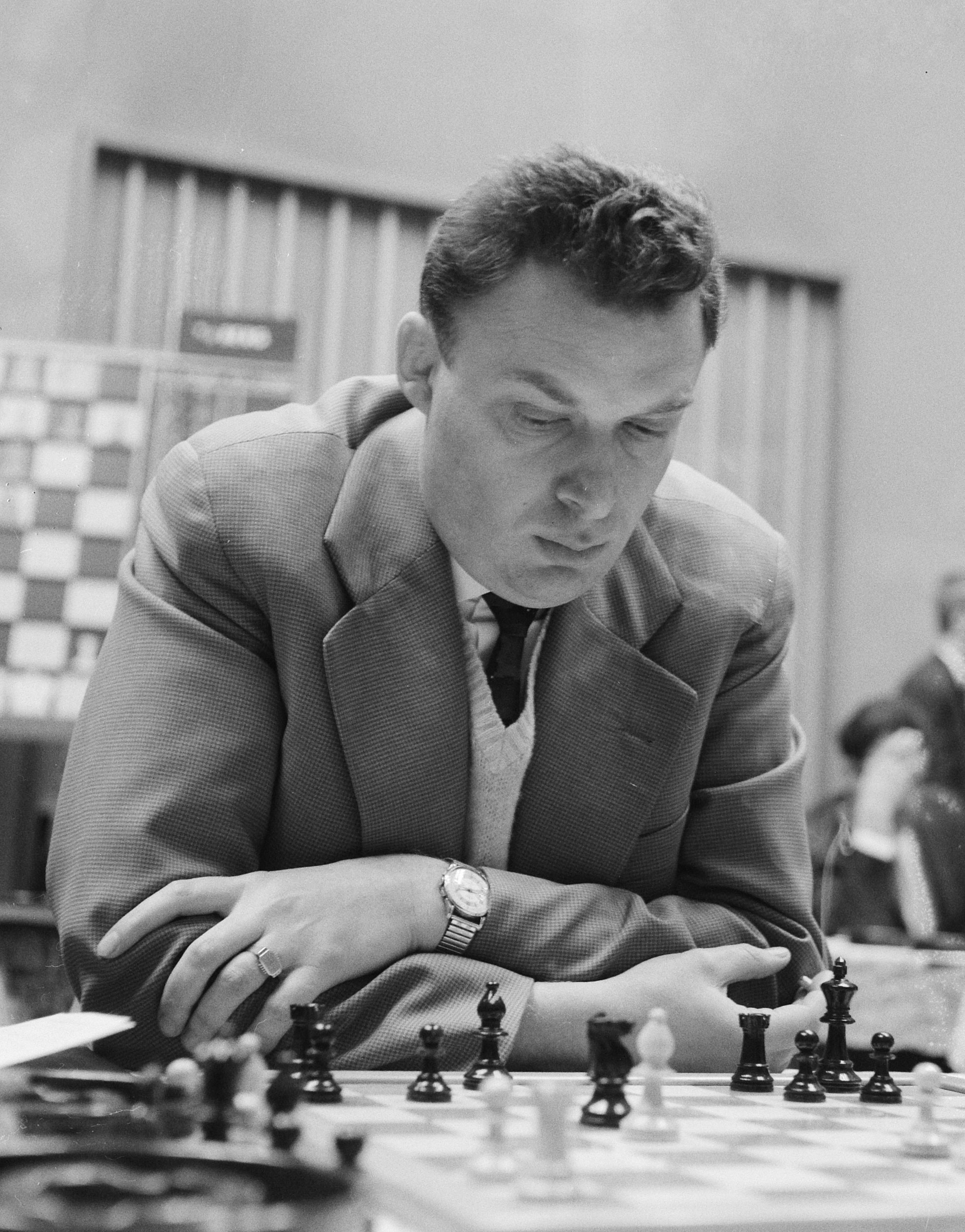
- Filip in 1966

Personal information
- Born: 27 October 1928 Prague, Czechoslovakia
- Died: 27 April 2009 (aged 80) Prague, Czech Republic

Chess career
- Country: Czech Republic
- Title: Grandmaster (1955)
- Peak rating: 2510 (July 1971)

Miroslav Filip (27 October 1928 – 27 April 2009) was a Czech chess grandmaster. Filip was awarded the title of International Master in 1953, and the Grandmaster title in 1955. Filip represented Czechoslovakia in 12 consecutive Chess Olympiads from Helsinki 1952 to Nice 1974, playing 194 games with the overall result (+62–28=104).

== World Championship candidate ==
Filip twice qualified for the Candidates Tournament, which is the tournament to choose a world championship challenger.

In 1955 Filip placed seventh in the Gothenburg Interzonal, qualifying for the Candidates, which was held in Amsterdam the following year. He placed eighth out of ten players. (See World Chess Championship 1957.)

In 1962 Filip placed fifth (out of 23 players) in the Stockholm Interzonal. This qualified him for the Candidates tournament in Curaçao, where he tied for last place out of eight players. (See World Chess Championship 1963.)

== Three-time Czechoslovak Chess Champion ==
Filip won the Czechoslovak Chess Championship three times: in 1950 at Gottwaldov, in 1952 at Tatranska Lomnica, and in 1954 in Prague.

== Other results ==
He played in the European Team Chess Championship twice, winning an individual gold in 1970 for the best score and a bronze in 1977 for the third best score. Tournament results include first place at Prague 1956 and second at Marienbad 1960, Buenos Aires 1961 and Bern 1975. In the early 1980s Filip retired from playing professional chess, but remained active as a chess journalist.

== Notable games ==
Tal vs. Filip, Curaçao 1962

Position: f1 white rook, h2 white king, a2 black queen, d3 black rook, c3 black pawn, a3 white pawn, h4 white pawn, f4 white queen, e4 white rook, c5 black bishop, b5 black pawn, g6 black pawn, f6 white bishop, e6 black bishop, f7 black pawn, g8 black king

Final position

The game Tal–Miroslav Filip is one of Filip's most famous chess games. Filip was playing with the black pieces against the Latvian grandmaster and former world champion Mikhail Tal at the Candidates Tournament at Curaçao in 1962, part of the 1963 World Championship cycle.

Tal vs. Filip, Candidates Tournament (round 12), Curacao 1962; Sicilian Defence (ECO B43)
1.e4 c5 2.Nf3 e6 3.d4 cxd4 4.Nxd4 a6 5.Nc3 Qc7 6.f4 b5 7.a3 Bb7 8.Qf3 Nf6 9.Bd3 Bc5 10.Nb3 Be7 11.0-0 0-0 12.Bd2 d6 13.g4 d5 14.e5 Nfd7 15.Qh3 g6 16.Nd4 Nc6 17.Nce2 Nxd4 18.Nxd4 Nc5 19.b4 Ne4 20.Be3 Rfe8 21.Rae1 Bf8 22.Nf3 a5 23.f5 exf5 24.gxf5 Rxe5 25.fxg6 hxg6 26.Nxe5 Qxe5 27.c3 axb4 28.Bd4 Bc8 29.Qg2 Qh5 30.Bxe4 dxe4 31.Qxe4 Qg5+ 32.Kh1 Be6 33.Be5 Rd8 34.h4 Qh5 35.Qf4 Rd3 36.Bf6 Qd5+ 37.Kg1 bxc3 38.Re4 Bc5+ 39.Kh2 Qa2+ 0–1

== Death ==
Miroslav Filip died at 80 years of age in Prague on 27 April 2009.
