= Kapfenberg =

- Municipality
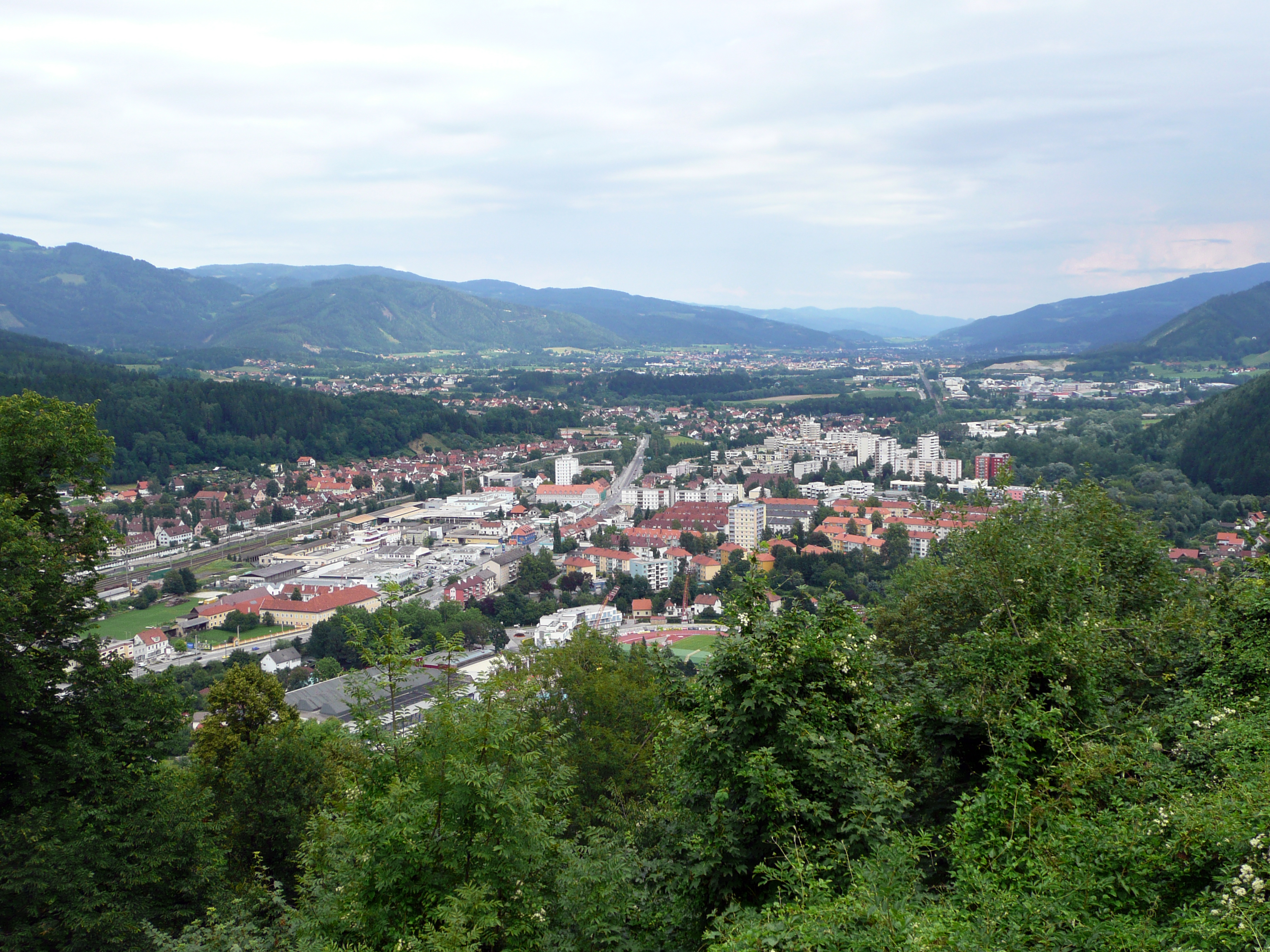
- Overview of Kapfenberg in Styria

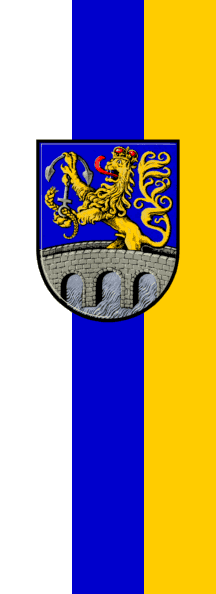
- Flag Coat of arms

- Location within Austria
- Coordinates: 47°26′N 15°17′E
- Country: Austria
- State: Styria
- District: Bruck-Mürzzuschlag

Government
  - Mayor: Matthäus Bachernegg (SPÖ)

Area
  - Total: 82 km^{2} (32 sq mi)
- Elevation: 502 m (1,647 ft)

Population (2024)
  - Total: 22,080
  - Density: 270/km^{2} (700/sq mi)
- Time zone: UTC+1 (CET)
  - Summer (DST): UTC+2 (CEST)
- Postal code: 8605
- Area code: 03862
- Vehicle registration: BM
- Website: www.kapfenberg.at

Kapfenberg ([ˈkapfənbɛʁk]) is a city in the Bruck-Mürzzuschlag District of the Austrian state of Styria. It lies in the Mürz valley in Upper Styria, between Bruck an der Mur and Kindberg, and forms part of one of the main industrial and transport corridors of central Styria. With 21,964 residents with a main residence as of 30 September 2024, it is the third-largest city in Styria after Graz and Leoben.

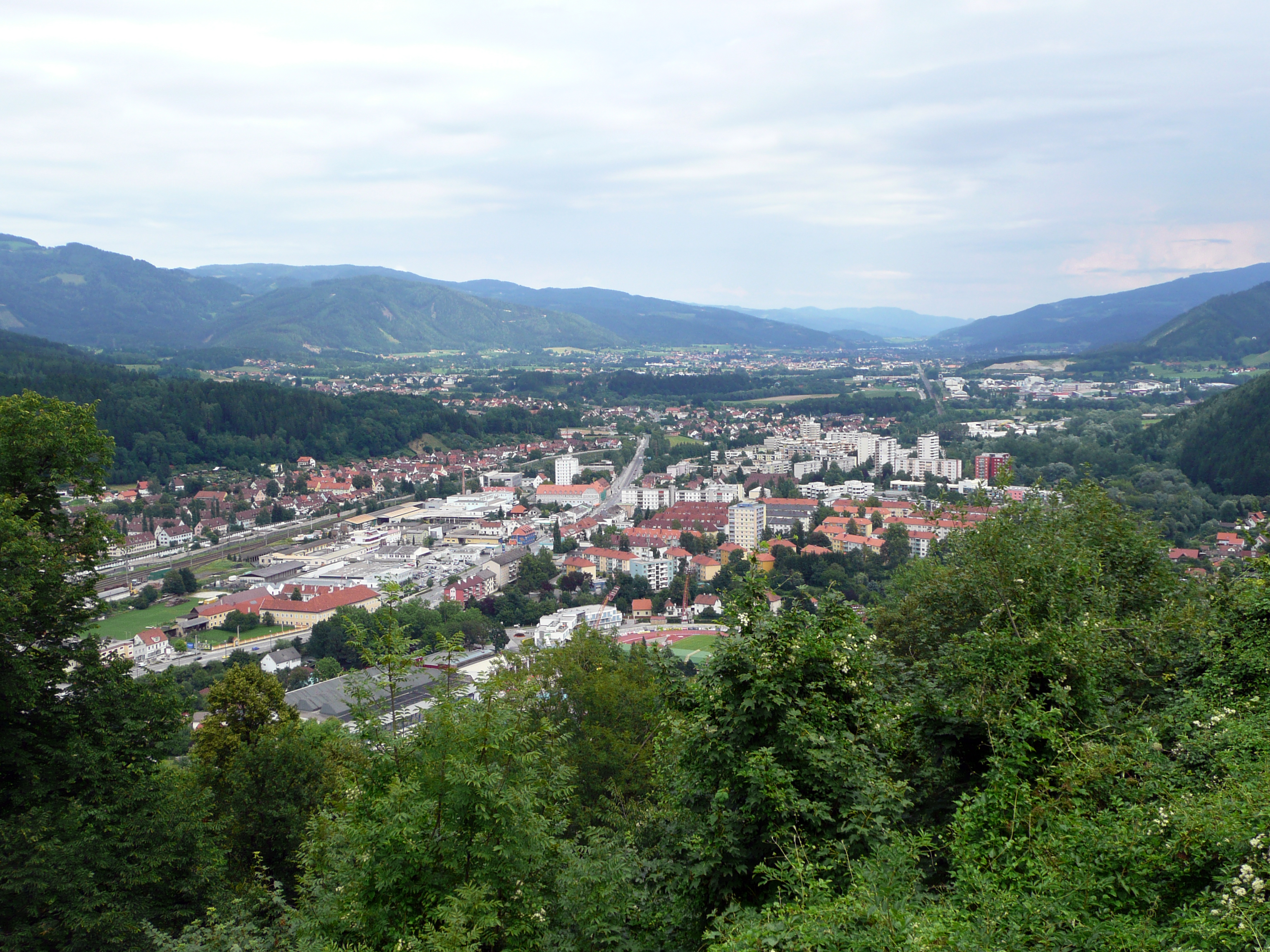
Kapfenberg in the Mürz valley

The municipality covers 82 km^{2} (32 sq mi) and lies at an elevation of about 501 m (1,644 ft). Its highest point is the Floning, which rises to 1,583 m (5,194 ft). On 1 January 2015, the former municipality of Parschlug was merged into Kapfenberg as part of the Styria municipal structural reform.

The area around Kapfenberg has been settled since prehistoric times. Finds from the Rettenwandhöhle include Stone Age tools, Bronze Age objects and later archaeological remains. The church of St Martin was first mentioned in 1096, while Oberkapfenberg Castle was documented in 1173 as Castrum chaffenberch. The settlement was referred to as a market in 1256 and developed during the Middle Ages as a local centre of trade, crafts and administration.

Kapfenberg’s modern development was closely tied to industry. In the 19th century, railway construction and the growth of iron and steel production transformed the market town into an industrial centre. The first train passed through Kapfenberg in 1844, and in 1854 Franz Mayr von Melnhof established Austria’s first crucible steelworks in the town. In 1894, the Böhler brothers acquired the Kapfenberg steelworks, which became one of the town’s most important employers. Kapfenberg was elevated to the status of a city on 9 May 1924.

The city remains an important centre of the Styrian steel and manufacturing industry. Voestalpine BÖHLER Edelstahl operates a major special-steel plant in Kapfenberg; a new special-steel plant opened in 2023 and is designed to produce up to 205,000 tonnes of special steels annually when operating at full capacity.

The town’s best-known landmark is Oberkapfenberg Castle, a medieval hilltop castle above the town. The castle was built by the Lords of Stubenberg and later expanded; today it is used for cultural events, exhibitions and tourism. It hosts the Ritterfest, a medieval festival held at the castle.

== Geography ==
Kapfenberg is a city in the Bruck-Mürzzuschlag district of the Austrian state of Styria. It lies in the valley of the Mürz river near the Eastern Alps. The city incorporates 15 settlements, the largest of which is Hafendorf.

The Oberkapfenberg castle near the town was built in the 12th century by the Lords of Stubenberg and expanded in the 15th century. The castle went to a dilapidated condition in the 17th century before being restored in the 19th century. In 1992, it was purchased by the municipality of Kapfenberg, and it hosts the annual Ritterfest ("knights festival").

== Demographics ==
With an estimated population of 22,080 individuals in 2024, it is the third largest city in Styria. The population consisted of 10,901 males and 11,179 females, while 3,405 inhabitants (15.4%) were under the age of seventeen. Apart from Austrians, who make up nearly 78% of the population, the town also had a significant proportion of people from other countries majorly from Switzerland. The town is a major steel production center, with the stainless steel factory operated by manufacturer voestalpine having an annual capacity of 205,000 tonnes.

== Sports ==
The Franz Fekete Stadium is a 10,000 seater football stadium in the city. Inaugurated in 1950, it is home to the Austrian Bundesliga club Kapfenberger SV. Formed in 1976, the Kapfenberg Bulls is a team in the Österreichische Basketball Bundesliga, the highest professional basketball league in Austria. In 1970, Kapfenberg hosted the European Team Chess Championship, which was won by the Soviet Union.

== Notable people ==
- Ernst Kovacic (born 1943), violinist and conductor
- Melitta Breznik (born 1961), doctor and writer
- Peter Nehr (born 1952), American politician
- Peter Pilz (born 1954), politician
- Ruth Feldgrill-Zankel (born 1942), politician
- Ulrike Diebold (born 1961), physicist and materials scientist
