= Ruth Feldgrill-Zankel =

Austrian politician (born 1942)

Ruth Feldgrill-Zankel (born 15 September 1942) is an Austrian politician and former Federal Minister of the Environment, Youth and Family.

Feldgrill-Zankel was born in Kapfenberg, Styria, in 1942. She briefly studied abroad at North Phoenix High School in Arizona. She obtained a diploma in commercial studies at Vienna's Hochschule für Welthandel in 1965. She later worked as a journalist and became involved in politics.

From 1987 she was a member of the city council of Graz for the Austrian People's Party (ÖVP). She was part of the cabinet of Chancellor Franz Vranitzky from 5 March 1991 until 25 November 1992. Following that post, she was deputy mayor of Graz until 1998.
