= Franz Riepl =

Austrian architect (born 1932)

Franz Riepl (born 1 September 1932, in Sarleinsbach) is an Austrian architect, best known for his restoration work on historical monuments in Wels. A graduate of TU Wien and the Technical University of Munich, he is a professor at the Graz University of Technology, and has received a Kulturpreis des Landes Oberösterreich and a Heinrich Gleißner Prize.
