= Pan American Team Chess Championship =

The Pan American Team Chess Championship is an international team chess tournament open to national federations affiliated to FIDE in the Americas. It is organized by the Confederation of Chess for America (CCA), and the winner qualifies to participate at the next World Team Chess Championship.

The tournament has been held at irregular intervals since 1971. Its most recent edition took place in 2013, which was won by the United States in its debut appearance at the event. Cuba has won five of the nine editions of the tournament, Argentina has won twice, and Brazil and the United States have each won once.

== Competition ==
Each member federation located in FIDE Zones 2.1 to 2.5 is entitled to enter a national team of four players and up to two reserve players. Matches are contested on four boards. The final standings in the tournament are determined by the number of game points scored by each team. The tournament has been held as a single round-robin except in 1987 and 2013, when a double round-robin was played. Between four and eight teams have participated in each edition of the tournament.

== Results ==
Year	Location	Gold	Silver	Bronze	Participating federations
1971	(Argentina) Tucumán	Argentina; Miguel Najdorf; Oscar Panno; Raúl Sanguineti; Miguel Quinteros; Samuel Schweber	Cuba; Eleazar Jiménez; Silvino García Martínez; Eldis Cobo Arteaga; Jesús Rodríguez Gonzáles; Román Hernández Onna	Brazil; Eduardo Asfora; Vitório Chemin; Herman Claudius van Riemsdijk; Hélder Câmara; Francisco Alves dos Santos	Argentina; Bolivia; Brazil; Chile; Cuba; Ecuador; Paraguay; Uruguay
1985	(Argentina) Villa Gesell	Argentina; Miguel Najdorf; Miguel Quinteros; Oscar Panno; Gerardo Barbero; Pablo Ricardi; Guillermo Soppe	Brazil; Jaime Sunye Neto; Gilberto Milos; Rubens Filguth; Herman Claudius van Riemsdijk; Francisco Trois	Chile; Iván Morovic; Roberto Cifuentes; Manuel Abarca Aguirre; Carlos Silva Sánchez; Marcelo Duarte; Christian Michel Yunis	Argentina; Bolivia; Brazil; Chile; Paraguay; Peru; Uruguay
1987	(Argentina) Junín	Cuba; Jesús Nogueiras; Amador Rodríguez Céspedes; Guillermo García González; Reynaldo Vera; Joaquin Carlos Diaz; Walter Arencibia	Chile; Roberto Cifuentes; Hernán Salazar Jacob; Manuel Abarca Aguirre; Carlos Silva Sánchez; Marcelo Duarte; Ricardo Araya	Argentina; Marcelo Tempone; Guillermo Soppe; Jorge Gómez Baillo; Ariel Sorín; Alejandro Hoffman; Carlos Schwanek	Argentina; Chile; Cuba; Paraguay; Peru; Uruguay
1991	(Brazil) Guarapuava	Cuba; Jesús Nogueiras; Walter Arencibia; Amador Rodríguez Céspedes; Reynaldo Vera; Román Hernández Onna; Joaquin Carlos Diaz	Brazil; Jaime Sunye Neto; Herman Claudius van Riemsdijk; Darcy Lima; Cícero Braga; Aron Corrêa; Everaldo Matsuura	Colombia; Alonso Zapata; Gildardo García; Nelson Gamboa; Jorge Mario Clavijo; Ricardo Díaz	Argentina; Brazil; Chile; Colombia; Cuba; Mexico; Paraguay; Uruguay
1995	(Brazil) Cascavel	Cuba; Jesús Nogueiras; Walter Arencibia; Reynaldo Vera; Amador Rodríguez Céspedes; Julio Becerra Rivero; Juan Borges Mateos	Argentina; Pablo Zarnicki; Pablo Ricardi; Sergio David Slipak; Ariel Sorín; Marcelo Tempone; Alejandro Hoffman	Brazil; Gilberto Milos; Jaime Sunye Neto; Darcy Lima; Giovanni Vescovi; Everaldo Matsuura; Cícero Braga	Argentina; Bolivia; Brazil; Chile; Cuba; Paraguay; Uruguay
2000	(Venezuela) Mérida	Cuba; Reynaldo Vera; Jesús Nogueiras; Walter Arencibia; Lázaro Bruzón; Leinier Domínguez; Rodney Pérez	Brazil; Gilberto Milos; Rafael Leitão; Giovanni Vescovi; Darcy Lima	Uruguay; Martín Crosa Coll; Guillermo Carvalho Fattoruso; Daniel Izquierdo Saravia; Mario Saralegui Cassan; Jaime Escofet Fernández	Brazil; Cuba; Netherlands Antilles; Venezuela (two teams); Uruguay
2003	(Brazil) Rio de Janeiro	Cuba; Leinier Domínguez; Lázaro Bruzón; Neuris Delgado Ramírez; Walter Arencibia; Reynaldo Vera	Brazil; Henrique Mecking; Darcy Lima; Cícero Braga; Everaldo Matsuura; Eduardo Limp; Rodrigo Disconzi da Silva	Ecuador; Carlos Matamoros Franco; Daniel Mieles Palau; Plinio Pazos Gambarrotti; Martha Fierro	Brazil; Cuba; Ecuador; Paraguay
2009	(Brazil) Mendes	Brazil; Giovanni Vescovi; Rafael Leitão; Alexandr Fier; Gilberto Milos; André Diamant; Darcy Lima	Cuba; Leinier Domínguez; Lázaro Bruzón; Fidel Corrales Jiménez; Neuris Delgado Ramírez; Yuniesky Quesada; Holden Hernández Carmenates	Venezuela; Rafael Prasca Sosa; Johann Álvarez Márquez; José Sequera Paolini; Wiston Boada; Julio Ostos	Argentina; Brazil; Colombia; Cuba; Dominican Republic; Venezuela
2013	(Brazil) Campinas	United States; Alexander Onischuk; Varuzhan Akobian; Ray Robson; Aleksandr Lenderman; Sam Shankland	Cuba; Leinier Domínguez; Lázaro Bruzón; Yuniesky Quesada; Isan Reynaldo Ortiz Suárez	Brazil; Henrique Mecking; Gilberto Milos; Felipe El Debs; Diego Di Berardino; Everaldo Matsuura	Brazil; Cuba; United States; Uruguay

== Medal table ==
Rank	Nation	Gold	Silver	Bronze	Total
1	Cuba	5	3	0	8
2	Argentina	2	1	1	4
3	Brazil	1	4	3	8
4	United States	1	0	0	1
5	Chile	0	1	1	2
6	Colombia	0	0	1	1
6	Ecuador	0	0	1	1
6	Uruguay	0	0	1	1
6	Venezuela	0	0	1	1
Totals (9 entries)		9	9	9	27

== Other international team tournaments in the Americas ==
Team chess events are currently part of the program at the Central American Games, and have sometimes been part of the Bolivarian Games, most recently in 2013.

Mar del Plata hosted a South American Team Chess Championship in 1989 won by Argentina, and a Mercosur Olympiad in 2009 won by Brazil.

A Central American and Caribbean Team Chess Championship was held annually from 1963 to 1975. Previously, the same name had been given to a team chess tournament held as a side event at the 1938 Central American and Caribbean Games in Panama City, which was won by Cuba. The 1946 Central American and Caribbean Games in Barranquilla also featured a team chess side event, also won by Cuba.

A Central American Team Chess Championship has been held annually since 2011. A tournament by the same name had previously been contested four times from 1946 to 1953.

== See also ==
- Chess Olympiad
- Chess at the African Games
- Asian Team Chess Championship
- European Team Chess Championship
