= Cuban Chess Championship =

In the second part of the 19th century, Celso Golmayo Zúpide had been generally accepted as Cuban champion since his 1862 match defeat of Félix Sicre. In 1912–1937 the Cuban Championship as Copa Dewar occurred. Maria Teresa Mora was the first woman who won Copa Dewar in 1922.

== Championships ==
Year	City	Winner
1860	Havana	Félix Sicre
1862	Havana	Celso Golmayo Zúpide
1897	Havana	Celso Golmayo Torriente
1898	Havana	Juan Corzo
1902	Havana	Juan Corzo
1907	Havana	Juan Corzo
1912	Havana	Juan Corzo
1914		Rafael Blanco
1918		Juan Corzo
1920		Rafael Blanco
1921		Baire Benítez
1922	Havana	María Teresa Mora
1923	Havana	José Fernández Migoya
1927		Francisco Planas
1929		Francisco Planas
1937		Rafael Blanco
1939		Miguel Alemán
1942		Juan González de Vega
1943		Juan González de Vega
1944		Angel Fernández Fernández
1950		Rosendo Romero; Eldis Cobo Arteaga
1951		Juan González de Vega
1952	Havana	Juan González de Vega
1955	Havana	Carlos Calero
1956		Armando Cabrera
1957		Eleazar Jiménez
1958		Rogelio Ortega
1960	Havana	Eleazar Jiménez
1963	Havana	Eleazar Jiménez
1965	Havana	Eleazar Jiménez
1966	Havana	Rogelio Ortega
1967	Havana	Eleazar Jiménez
1968	Santiago de Cuba	Silvino García Martínez
1969	Matanzas	Jesús Rodríguez Gonzáles
1970	Havana	Silvino García Martínez
1971	Havana	Jesús Rodríguez Gonzáles
1972	Playa Larga, Matanzas	Jesús Rodríguez Gonzáles
1973	Cienfuegos	Silvino García Martínez
1974	Varadero, Matanzas	Guillermo Garcia González
1975	Santa Clara	Guillermo Estévez Morales
1976	Holguín	José Fernandez Leon
1977	Sancti Spiritus	Gerardo Lebredo Zarragoitia; José Luis Vilela de Acuña; Jesús Nogueiras
1978	Camagüey	Jesús Nogueiras
1979	Santiago de Cuba	Silvino García Martínez
1980	Holguín	Néstor Vélez
1981–2	Sagua la Grande	Román Hernández Onna
1983	Sagua de Tánamo	Guillermo Garcia González
1984	Holguín	Jesús Nogueiras; Amador Rodríguez Céspedes
1985	Camagüey	Jorge Armas
1986	Santiago de Cuba	Walter Arencibia
1987	Las Tunas	Juan Borges
1988	Camagüey	Amador Rodríguez Céspedes
1989	Sancti Spiritus	Pedro Paneque
1990	Santiago de Cuba	Walter Arencibia
1991	Holguín	Jesús Nogueiras
1993	Matanzas	Juan Borges
1995	Matanzas	Julio Becerra; Juan Borges
1996	Las Tunas	Irisberto Herrera; Julio Becerra
1997	Matanzas	Reinaldo Vera; Amador Rodríguez Céspedes
1998	Matanzas	Julio Becerra
1999	Santa Clara	Rodne Pérez
2000	Santa Clara	Jesús Nogueiras
2001	Las Tunas	Reinaldo Vera
2002	Holguín	Leinier Domínguez
2003	Varadero, Matanzas	Leinier Domínguez
2004	Santa Clara	Lázaro Bruzón
2005	Santa Clara	Lázaro Bruzón
2006	Santa Clara	Leinier Domínguez
2007	Santa Clara	Lázaro Bruzón
2008	Santa Clara	Yuniesky Quesada
2009	Las Tunas	Lázaro Bruzón
2010	Ciego de Ávila	Lázaro Bruzón
2011	Ciego de Ávila	Yuniesky Quezada
2012	Ciego de Ávila	Leinier Domínguez
2013	Santa Clara	Isan Reynaldo Ortiz Suárez
2014	Santa Clara	Isan Reynaldo Ortiz Suárez
2015	Santa Clara	Isan Reynaldo Ortiz Suárez
2016	Matanzas	Leinier Domínguez
2017	Villa Clara	Lázaro Bruzón
2018	Havana	Yuri Gonzalez Vidal
2019	Villa Clara	Carlos Daniel Albornoz Cabrera
2020	Villa Clara	Carlos Daniel Albornoz Cabrera
2021		
2022	Santa Clara	Yasser Quesada Pérez
2023	Holguín	Elier Miranda Mesa
2024	Holguín	Luis Ernesto Quesada Pérez
2025	Ciego de Ávila	Jorge Roberto Elias Reyes

Naturally, chess is a hobby, but it is also a teacher of reason, and the countries that have good chess teams also lead the world in other more important spheres.

— Ernesto "Che" Guevara

== Women ==
Year	City	Winner
1965	Havana	Syla Martínez
1966		Nora Laya
1967		Nora Laya
1968		Nora Laya
1969		Elisa Yarruch
1970		Ada María Salgado
1971		Asela de Armas Pérez
1972		Nora Laya
1973		Asela de Armas Pérez
1974		Asela de Armas Pérez
1975		Asela de Armas Pérez
1976		Asela de Armas Pérez
1977		Asela de Armas Pérez
1978		Asela de Armas Pérez
1979		Asela de Armas Pérez
1980		Vivian Ramón Pita
1981		Zirka Frómeta Castillo
1982		Vivian Ramón Pita
1983		Zirka Frómeta Castillo
1984		Vivian Ramón Pita
1985		Tania Hernández
1986		Asela de Armas Pérez
1987		Zirka Frómeta Castillo
1988		Asela de Armas Pérez
1989		Vivian Ramón Pita
1990		Vivian Ramón Pita
1991		Vivian Ramón Pita
1992		Maritza Arribas Robaina
1993		Roquelina Fandiño Reyes
1994		Yudania Hernández Estévez
1995		Mairelys Delgado Crespo
1997	Havana	Maritza Arribas Robaina
1998		Vivian Ramón Pita
1999		Mairelys Delgado Crespo
2000		Vivian Ramón Pita
2001		Maritza Arribas Robaina
2002		Maritza Arribas Robaina
2003		Maritza Arribas Robaina
2004		Maritza Arribas Robaina
2005		Sulennis Piña Vega
2006	Caibarien	Milena Campos Vila
2007		Maritza Arribas Robaina
2008	Holguín	Maritza Arribas Robaina
2009		Maritza Arribas Robaina
2010	Holguín	Oleiny Linares Nápoles
2011	Santiago de Cuba	Yaniet Marrero Lopez
2012	Holguín	Lisandra Llaudy Pupo
2013	Holguín	Maritza Arribas Robaina
2014	Pinar del Río	Sulennis Piña Vega
2015	Santiago de Cuba	Maritza Arribas Robaina
2016	Cienfuegos	Oleyni Linares Nápoles
2017	Pinar del Río	Yerisbel Miranda Llanes
2018	Holguín	Lisandra Llaudy Pupo
