= Golmayo (surname) =

Golmayo is a surname. Notable people with the surname include:

- Celso Golmayo Torriente (1879–1924), Cuban–Spanish chess master, son of Celso and brother of Manuel
- Celso Golmayo Zúpide (1820–1898), Spanish–Cuban chess master
- Manuel Golmayo Torriente (1883–1973), Cuban-Spanish chess master
