= Román Hernández Onna =

Cuban chess grandmaster (1949–2021)

Personal information
- Born: 23 November 1949 Santiago de Cuba, Cuba
- Died: 1 June 2021 (aged 71)

Chess career
- Country: Cuba
- Title: Grandmaster (1978)
- Peak rating: 2500 (January 1979)

Román Hernández Onna (23 November 1949 – 1 June 2021) was a Cuban chess grandmaster. He was the Cuban Chess Championship winner in 1982.

== Biography ==
From the 1970s to the 1990s, Román Hernández Onna was one of Cuba's leading chess players. He won Cuban Chess Championship in 1982. One of his greatest successes in the international arena was in 1977 in a strong chess tournament in Las Palmas, where Román Hernández Onna shared the 4th place with Mikhail Tal and Walter Browne behind Anatoly Karpov, Bent Larsen and Jan Timman, and won parties against Larsen and Tal. In the same year, he also shared the 2nd place with Oscar Panno and Ulf Andersson in Biel Chess Festival behind Anthony Miles. His other chess tournament successes include: 3rd place in Kecskemét (1975, behind Károly Honfi and Ratmir Kholmov), shared 2nd-3rd place in Bogotá (1978, behind Efim Geller), shared 3rd-4th place in Quito (1978), 2nd place in Havana (1978, behind Silvino García Martínez) and the first place in this city in 1983, as well as two third place in the 'Premier' tournaments in Capablanca Memorial (1999 and 2003).

Román Hernández Onna played for Cuba in the Chess Olympiads:

- In 1970, at fourth board in the 19th Chess Olympiad in Siegen (+7, =7, -2),
- In 1972, at fourth board in the 20th Chess Olympiad in Skopje (+6, =7, -2),
- In 1978, at second board in the 23rd Chess Olympiad in Buenos Aires (+0, =9, -2),
- In 1980, at first reserve board in the 24th Chess Olympiad in La Valletta (+1, =1, -3),
- In 1982, at fourth board in the 25th Chess Olympiad in Lucerne (+3, =2, -2),
- In 1984, at first reserve board in the 26th Chess Olympiad in Thessaloniki (+3, =2, -1),
- In 1988, at second reserve board in the 28th Chess Olympiad in Thessaloniki (+4, =3, -0),
- In 1990, at first reserve board in the 29th Chess Olympiad in Novi Sad (+2, =3, -1).

Román Hernández Onna played for Cuba in the World Team Chess Championship:

- In 1989, at reserve board in the 2nd World Team Chess Championship in Lucerne (+1, =4, -1).

Román Hernández Onna played for Cuba in the Pan American Team Chess Championships:

- In 1971, at first reserve board in the 1st Panamerican Team Chess Championship in San Miguel de Tucumán (+1, =0, -1) and won team silver medal,
- In 1991, at first reserve board in the 4th Panamerican Team Chess Championship in Guarapuava (+3, =0, -1) and won team and individual gold medals.

Román Hernández Onna played for Cuba in the World Student Team Chess Championships:

- In 1963, at first reserve board in the 10th World Student Team Chess Championship in Budva (+2, =3, -3),
- In 1969, at third board in the 16th World Student Team Chess Championship in Dresden (+5, =2, -6),
- In 1972, at second board in the 19th World Student Team Chess Championship in Graz (+3, =7, -0),
- In 1976, at third board in the 21st World Student Team Chess Championship in Caracas (+5, =4, -1) and won team bronze medal.

In 1975, Román Hernández Onna was awarded the FIDE International Master (IM) title, but in 1978 he was awarded FIDE Grandmaster (GM) title. He also was FIDE Trainer (2014).
