= Irisberto Herrera =

Cuban chess grandmaster (born 1968)

Personal information
- Born: December 7, 1968 (age 57) Las Tunas, Cuba

Chess career
- Country: Cuba (until 2007); Spain (since 2007)
- Title: Grandmaster (1999)
- FIDE rating: 2420 (July 2026)
- Peak rating: 2487 (July 1999)

Irisberto Herrera (born December 7, 1968) is a Cuban-Spanish chess grandmaster. As of 2020 FIDE list his Elo rating was 2420.

In 1986 he won Cuban Junior Chess and in 1996 he and Julio Becerra tied in the Cuban Chess Championship.
