= Rogelio Ortega =

Rogelio Ortega may refer to:

- Rogelio Ortega Martínez (born 1955), Mexican educator and interim governor of Guerrero
- Rogelio Ortega (chess player) (1915–1980), Cuban chess player
