= Joaquín Carlos Díaz =

Cuban chess player (1948–2015)

Personal information
- Born: 5 July 1948 Pinar del Río, Cuba
- Died: 11 June 2015 (aged 66) Pinar del Río, Cuba

Chess career
- Country: Cuba
- Title: International Master (1975)
- Peak rating: 2485 (January 1988)

Joaquín Carlos Díaz Díaz, (Note: In this name that follows Hispanic American naming customs, the first or paternal surname is Díaz and the second or maternal family name is Díaz.) known by the hypocorism Quinito, (5 July 1948 — 11 June 2015) was a Cuban chess International Master (IM) (1975).

== Biography ==
Joaquín Carlos Díaz was born in Pinar del Río in 1948. From the late 1960s to the early 1990s he was one of the leading Cuban chess players. At the 1969 World Junior Chess Championship in Stockholm, he was the first Cuban to play Anatoly Karpov; according to Díaz's own account, Karpov won "very easily". In 1976 in Biel he participated in the World Chess Championship Interzonal Tournament where he ranked in 20th place. In 1987, in Camagüey, he won the Capablanca Memorial B tournament.

Díaz played for Cuba in four Chess Olympiads:

- In 1968, at second reserve board in the 18th Chess Olympiad in Lugano (+1, =4, -2),
- In 1970, at first reserve board in the 19th Chess Olympiad in Siegen (+3, =1, -4),
- In 1972, at second reserve board in the 20th Chess Olympiad in Skopje (+5, =4, -1),
- In 1990, at second reserve board in the 29th Chess Olympiad in Novi Sad (+3, =2, -0).

Díaz played for Cuba in four World Student Team Chess Championships:

- In 1966, at second reserve board in the 13th World Student Team Chess Championship in Örebro (+1, =3, -1),
- In 1969, at fourth board in the 16th World Student Team Chess Championship in Dresden (+1, =0, -2),
- In 1972, at first reserve board in the 19th World Student Team Chess Championship in Graz (+3, =3, -2),
- In 1974, at third board in the 20th World Student Team Chess Championship in Teesside (+7, =5, -0) and won individual bronze medal.

Díaz played for Cuba in two Pan American Team Chess Championships:

- In 1987, at first reserve board in the 3rd Pan American Team Chess Championship in Junín (+5, =0, -1) and won team gold and individual silver medals,
- In 1991, at second reserve board in the 4th Pan American Team Chess Championship in Guarapuava (+1, =2, -0) and won team and individual gold medals.

In 1975, Joaquín C. Díaz was awarded the FIDE International Master (IM) title.
