= Jesús Rodríguez Gonzáles =

Cuban chess player (1939–1995)

Personal information
- Born: 2 July 1939
- Died: July 1995 (aged 55–56)

Chess career
- Country: Cuba
- Title: International Master (1972)

Jesús Rodríguez Gonzáles (2 July 1939 – 1995) was a Cuban chess player, three-times Cuban Chess Championship winner (1969, 1971, 1972).

== Biography ==
In the 1960s and 1970s Jesús Rodríguez Gonzáles was one of the leading Cuban chess players. He three times won Cuban Chess Championships: in 1969, 1971 and 1972. Also Jesús Rodríguez Gonzáles was silver medalist of the Pan American Chess Championship in 1966.

Jesús Rodríguez Gonzáles played for Cuba in the Chess Olympiads:

- In 1960, at third board in the 14th Chess Olympiad in Leipzig (+5, =6, -7),
- In 1964, at third board in the 16th Chess Olympiad in Tel Aviv (+4, =2, -5),
- In 1966, at fourth board in the 17th Chess Olympiad in Havana (+3, =9, -4),
- In 1968, at fourth board in the 18th Chess Olympiad in Lugano (+5, =6, -3).

Jesús Rodríguez Gonzáles played for Cuba in the Panamerican Team Chess Championship:

- In 1971, at fourth board in the first Pan American Team Chess Championship in Tucumán (+3, =2, -1) and won team silver medal and individual bronze medal.

He was chess trainer of the Latin American Institute of Chess and chess writer. In Cuba, memorial tournaments are held in Jesús Rodríguez Gonzáles honor.
