= Zirka Frometa =

Cuban chess player (born 1963)

Personal information
- Born: Zirka Frometa Castillo; 7 June 1963 (age 63) Santiago de Cuba, Cuba

Chess career
- Country: Cuba
- Title: Woman Grandmaster (2008)
- Peak rating: 2285 (January 2004)

Zirka Frometa Castillo (born 7 June 1963) is a Cuban chess player who holds the FIDE title of Woman Grandmaster (WGM, 2008). She is a three-time winner of the Cuban Women's Chess Championship.

== Biography ==
From the early 1980s to the mid-2000s, Zirka Frometa was one of the leading chess players in the Cuba. Three times she won the Cuban Women's Chess Championships: 1981, 1983, 1987. In 2008 in San Salvador she won Pan American Women's Championship.

Frometa participated twice in the Women's World Chess Championship Interzonal Tournaments:

- In 1985, at Interzonal Tournament in Havana shared 11th-12th place with Asela de Armas Pérez;
- In 1987, at Interzonal Tournament in Tuzla ranked 17th place.

She played for Cuba in the Women's Chess Olympiads:

- In 1984, at third board in the 26th Chess Olympiad (women) in Thessaloniki (+6, =1, -4),
- In 1986, at third board in the 27th Chess Olympiad (women) in Dubai (+8, =2, -2) and won individual bronze medal,
- In 1988, at second board in the 28th Chess Olympiad (women) in Thessaloniki (+7, =2, -4),
- In 1990, at first reserve board in the 29th Chess Olympiad (women) in Novi Sad (+7, =0, -4),
- In 1994, at third board in the 31st Chess Olympiad (women) in Moscow (+4, =1, -5),
- In 2002, at third board in the 35th Chess Olympiad (women) in Bled (+3, =2, -5).

In 1979, Frometa was awarded the FIDE Woman International Master (WIM) title and received the FIDE Woman Grandmaster (WGM) in 2008.
