= Juan González de Vega =

Cuban chess player

Personal information
- Born: 15 July 1917
- Died: unknown

Chess career
- Country: Cuba

Juan González de Vega (15 July 1917 — 1990) was a Cuban chess player and Cuban Chess Championship four-times winner (1942, 1943, 1951, 1952).

== Biography ==
From the early 1940s to the early 1960s Juan González de Vega was one of the leading Cuban chess players. He four times won the Cuban Chess Championship: 1942, 1943, 1951, and 1952. In 1946, in Manhattan Chess Club he won the U.S. Blitz Chess Championship.

Juan González de Vega played for Cuba in the Chess Olympiad:

- In 1952, at third board in the 10th Chess Olympiad in Helsinki (+6, =7, -3).

In 1962, in Havana he participated in 1st Capablanca Memorial.

In 1963s Juan González de Vega emigrated to the United States and worked as surgery doctor at Manhattan's West Side Hospital.
