= Jorge Roberto Elias Reyes =

Cuban chess grandmaster (born 1999)

Personal information
- Born: 1999 (age 26–27) Camagüey, Cuba

Chess career
- Country: Cuba
- Title: Grandmaster (2026)
- FIDE rating: 2505 (September 2026)
- Peak rating: 2509 (August 2026)

Jorge Roberto Elias Reyes is a Cuban chess grandmaster.

== Chess career ==
In February 2025, he won the Cuban Chess Championship with an undefeated score of 7/10. This was the first time since 1999 that the national championship was won by an IM rather than a GM.

In January 2026, he tied for 3rd place with seven other players (including five grandmasters) in the Temuco International Chess Tournament. Later that month, he had a perfect start in the first six rounds of the Floripa Open, co-leading with grandmaster André Diamant. He finished the tournament with 8/10, earning his final GM norm.

He was awarded the Grandmaster title in 2026, after achieving his norms at the:

- Guillermo Garcia in Memoriam in May 2023
- LVII Capablanca in Memoriam Open in May 2024
- Brazil Chess Series Floripa in January 2026
