= José Luis Vilela de Acuña =

Cuban chess player (born 1953)

Personal information
- Born: 19 March 1953 (age 73) Havana, Cuba

Chess career
- Country: Cuba
- Title: International Master (1977)
- Peak rating: 2495 (July 1981)

José Luis Vilela de Acuña (born 19 March 1953) is a Cuban chess International master (IM) (1977), Cuban Chess Championship winner (1977).

== Biography ==
From the begin of 1970s to the begin of 1980s José Luis Vilela de Acuña was one of Cuba's leading chess players. In 1977, he shared first place with Gerardo Lebredo Zarragoitia and Jesús Nogueiras in Cuban Chess Championship. All three chess players have been declared Cuban chess champions.

José Luis Vilela de Acuña played for Cuba in the Chess Olympiads:

- In 1978, at fourth board in the 23rd Chess Olympiad in Buenos Aires (+2, =2, -2),
- In 1982, at second reserve board in the 25th Chess Olympiad in Lucerne (+1, =3, -1).

José Luis Vilela de Acuña played for Cuba in the World Student Team Chess Championships:

- In 1972, at fourth board in the 19th World Student Team Chess Championship in Graz (+2, =3, -5),
- In 1974, at fourth board in the 20th World Student Team Chess Championship in Teesside (+5, =4, -2),
- In 1976, at first reserve board in the 21st World Student Team Chess Championship in Caracas (+2, =3, -0) and won team bronze medal,
- In 1977, at fourth board in the 22nd World Student Team Chess Championship in Mexico City (+8, =1, -0) and won team silver medal.

José Luis Vilela de Acuña played for Cuba in the World Youth U26 Team Chess Championship:

- In 1978, at third board in the 1st World Youth U26 Team Chess Championship in Mexico City (+5, =4, -1) and won team bronze medal.

José Luis Vilela de Acuña played for Cuba in the CACAC Team Chess Championship:

- In 1974, at fourth board in the 12th CACAC Team Chess Championship in San Salvador (+5, =2, -0) and won team and individual gold medals.

In 1977, José Luis Vilela de Acuña was awarded the FIDE International Master (IM) title. He is also a FIDE Trainer and worked as chess trainer.
