= Eleazar Jiménez =

Cuban chess player (1928–2000)

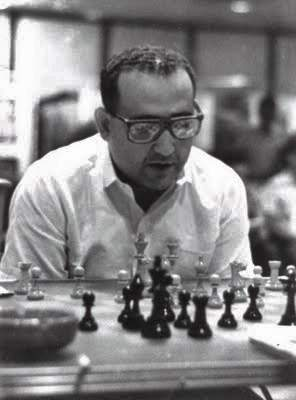

Personal information
- Born: 25 June 1928 Ciego de Ávila, Cuba
- Died: 6 May 2000 (aged 71)

Chess career
- Country: Cuba
- Title: International Master (1963)
- Peak rating: 2410 (July 1971)

Eleazar Jiménez Zerquera (25 June 1928 – 6 May 2000) was a Cuban chess master.

== Biography ==
Jiménez won the Cuban Championship five times, in 1957, 1960, 1963, 1965, and 1967. He won the Pan American Chess Championship three times, in 1963, 1966 and 1970.

In 1962, he tied for 15-16th in Havana (1st Capablanca Memorial; Miguel Najdorf won). In 1963, he tied for 2nd-3rd in Havana (zonal). In 1963, he tied for 16-17th in Havana (2nd Capablanca Memorial; Viktor Korchnoi won). In 1963, he took 14th in Moscow (Vasily Smyslov won). In 1964, he took 15th in Havana (3rd Capablanca Memorial; Wolfgang Uhlmann and Smyslov won). In 1965, he took 15th in Havana (4th Capablanca Memorial; Smyslov won).

In 1966, he tied for 1st-2nd with Albéric O'Kelly de Galway in Costa del Sol, Spain. In 1967, he took 2nd in Caracas (zonal). In 1967, he took 18th in Palma de Mallorca (Bent Larsen won). In 1967, he took 16th in Leningrad (Korchnoi won). In 1968, he took 7th in Havana (6th Capablanca Memorial; Ratmir Kholmov won). In 1969, he tied for 8-9th in Havana (7th Capablanca Memorial; Alexei Suetin and Korchnoi won). In 1969, he tied for 1st-2nd with Olavo Yépez in Quito (zonal), and beat him in a playoff match (2.5 : 0.5). In 1970, he took 24th in Palma de Mallorca (interzonal; Robert James Fischer won). In 1971, he played for Cuba at first board (+2 –1 =3), and won a team silver medal at the first Pan American Team Chess Championship in Tucuman. In 1972, he took 16th in Cienfuegos (9th Capablanca Memorial; Anatoly Lein won).

Jimenez played for Cuba in seven Chess Olympiads.

- In 1960, at first board in the 14th Chess Olympiad in Leipzig (+4 –3 =11);
- In 1962, at first board in the 15th Chess Olympiad in Varna (+3 –3 =13);
- In 1964, at first board in the 16th Chess Olympiad in Tel Aviv (+3 –2 =11);
- In 1966, at first board in the 17th Chess Olympiad in Havana (+4 –6 =5);
- In 1968, at first board in the 18th Chess Olympiad in Lugano (+3 –3 =6);
- In 1970, at second board in the 19th Chess Olympiad in Siegen (+3 –1 =11);
- In 1974, at fourth board in the 21st Olympiad in Nice (+6 –0 =4).

Jimenez was awarded the International Master (IM) title in 1963.
