= Lázaro Bruzón =

Cuban-American chess grandmaster (born 1982)

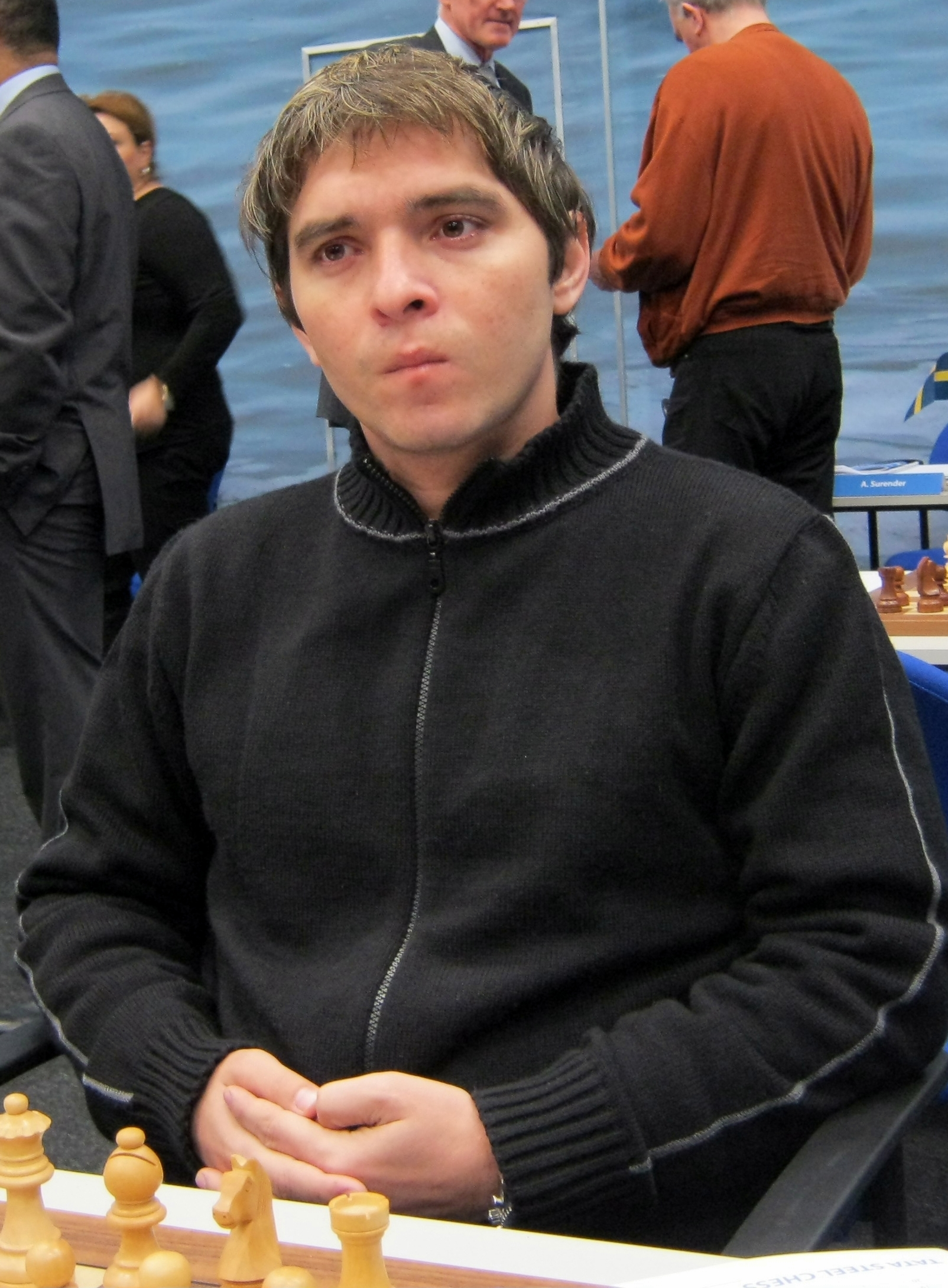
- Bruzón at the 74th Tata Steel, 2012

Personal information
- Born: Lázaro Bruzón Batista; 2 May 1982 (age 44) Las Tunas, Cuba

Chess career
- Country: Cuba (until 2020); United States (since 2020)
- Title: Grandmaster (1999)
- FIDE rating: 2555 (September 2026)
- Peak rating: 2717 (October 2012)
- Peak ranking: No. 26 (October 2005)

Lázaro Bruzón Batista (born 2 May 1982 in Holguín) is a Cuban-American chess grandmaster. He is a former World Junior Champion, two-times American Continental champion, two-time Iberoamerican champion and six-time Cuban champion.

Bruzón played for Cuba at the Chess Olympiads between 2000 and 2014.

== Career ==
He won the World Junior Chess Championship in 2000. This achievement qualified him for the FIDE World Chess Championship 2002.

Bruzón won the Lausanne Young Masters, a knockout event, in 2001 by defeating Étienne Bacrot in the final. Later that year, at the end of November, he competed in the FIDE World Championship: after defeating Liviu-Dieter Nisipeanu in the first round, he was knocked out by Kiril Georgiev.

In 2002, Bruzón won the 37th Capablanca Memorial (Elite group) and shared first place with compatriot Leinier Domínguez in the North Sea Cup.

In January 2004, he won the Corus B tournament and thus earned a spot in the 2005 Corus A tournament. In June of that year, he won the 12th Guillermo García Memorial in Villa Clara. In October 2004, he played on second board for Cuba in the 36th Chess Olympiad, scoring 8/11 with a performance rating of 2771. This result helped his team to finish seventh. In December 2004 he played in the Pamplona chess tournament, that was won by Boris Gelfand; Bruzón came third, scoring 4/7.

In 2004 he won the Cuban Chess Championship for the first time. He also won it in 2005, 2007, 2009, 2010 and 2017.

In early 2005, he took part in the Corus A tournament and finished tenth out of 14 participants scoring 6.5/13 points. In August 2005, he won the American Continental Championship and therefore qualified for the Chess World Cup 2005. In the latter, he knocked out Nikolai Kabanov and Alexander Onischuk, then he lost to Evgeny Bareev in the third round and thus was eliminated from the competition. In October 2005, he tied for 2nd–5th with Kamil Mitoń, Zhang Pengxiang and Artyom Timofeev in the Samba Cup in Skanderborg. In December 2005, Bruzon won the Carlos Torre Repetto Memorial by defeating Michal Krasenkow in the final.

Bruzon took part in the 2006 Biel Chess Festival, where he scored 2.5/10, finishing in last place. In November 2006, he won the first Iberoamerican Chess Championship.

In the Chess World Cup 2007 he was knocked out in the first round by Zdenko Kožul.

In 2008, he came first in the 35th open tournament in Manresa and in the HZ Chess Tournament in Vlissingen.

He participated in the Chess World Cup 2009, where he was defeated in the first round by Fabiano Caruana.

In April 2010, he tied for first with Kamil Mitoń, Bojan Kurajica, Yuri Gonzalez Vidal, Evgeny Gleizerov and Bartłomiej Heberla in the 4th Torneo Internacional de Ajedrez Ciudad de La Laguna, placing second on countback. Later that year, in November, he won the Magistral Casino de Barcelona round-robin tournament, edging out Ivan Salgado Lopez on tiebreak.

In 2011, he won the American Continental Championship for the second time. At the Chess World Cup 2011 Bruzon eliminated sequentially Yuniesky Quesada, Francisco Vallejo Pons, and Lê Quang Liêm, and made it to the fourth round, where he was defeated by Ruslan Ponomariov in the blitz tiebreaks.

In July 2013, Bruzon placed equal first in the World Open and won the 8th Edmonton International Tournament. In the following month, he took part in the Chess World Cup 2013: after beating Evgeny Najer in round one, he lost to Teimour Radjabov in the second round.

He won the Torre Memorial consecutively in 2013, 2014, 2015 and 2016.

In December 2014, he won the 5th Latin American Cup.

Bruzon competed in the Chess World Cup 2015, where he was knocked out in the second round by Vladimir Kramnik. In November 2015 he finished clear first in the 6th Iberoamerican championship in Bilbao, winning this tournament for the second time.

In 2019, Bruzon tied for first place at the U.S. Masters Chess Championship.
