= Amador Rodríguez Céspedes =

Cuban chess grandmaster (born 1956)

Personal information
- Born: 18 September 1956 (age 69) Holguín, Cuba

Chess career
- Country: Cuba (until 2002); Spain (since 2002)
- Title: Grandmaster (1978)
- Peak rating: 2555 (January 1997)

Amador Rodríguez Céspedes (born 8 September 1956) is a Cuban chess Grandmaster (GM) (1978) who represented Spain since 2002.

== Biography ==
From the mid-1970s to the end of the 1990s, Amador Rodríguez Céspedes was one of the leading Cuban chess players. Between 1974 and 1996 he participated ten times in Chess Olympiads, in 1989, 1993 and 1997 he represented national team at World Team Chess Championships, while in 1974, 1976, 1977 and 1978 – at the World Youth U26 Team Chess Championships, where winning 3 medals: silver and 2 bronze. During his career Amador Rodríguez Céspedes won three times in Cuban Chess Championship: in 1984 (together with Jesús Nogueiras), 1988 and 1997 (together with Reynaldo Vera González-Quevedo), Amador Rodríguez Céspedes also competed three times in World Chess Championship Interzonal Tournaments, reaching the best result in 1987 in Subotica, where he finished sixth.

Amador Rodríguez Céspedes participated in international tournaments many times, winning or dividing first places in tournaments dedicated to Capablanca Memorial (1984, 1989 and 1993, 1994 – B tournament) and in Vrnjačka Banja (1977), Havana (1979), Prague (1980), Manzanillo (1981, zonal tournament), Bayamo (1981), Envigado (1983), Caracas (1985, zonal tournament), Badalona (1985), Medina del Campo (1986), Pančevo (1987), Amsterdam (1987, OHRA B tournament, with Vlastimil Hort), Bayamo (1987, zonal tournament), Buenos Aires (1987), Martigny (1988), Bogotá (1990), Cambados (1990), Málaga (1990), Burriana (1990, with Julio Granda Zuñiga), Holguín (1992), Havana (1992), Guadalajara (1994) and Olot (1996).

In the years 1999–2001 Amador Rodríguez Céspedes collaborated with Peter Leko, accompanying him, among others at the elite tournaments in Linares International Chess Tournament and Tata Steel Chess Tournament and at World Chess Championship in Las Vegas (1999) and New Delhi (2000).

Amador Rodríguez Céspedes awarded the International Master (IM) title in 1975 and the Grandmaster (GM) title in 1977
