= Cícero Braga =

Brazilian chess player (born 1958)

Personal information
- Born: 7 March 1958 (age 68)

Chess career
- Country: Brazil
- Title: International Master (1991)
- FIDE rating: 2418 (July 2026)
- Peak rating: 2444 (October 2001)

Cícero Nogueira Braga (born 7 March 1958) is a Brazilian chess International master (IM) (1991), Brazilian Chess Championships medalist (1978, 1979, 1988), Chess Olympiad individual bronze medal winner (1978).

== Biography ==
From the mid-1970s to the mid-2000s Cícero Braga was one of Brazil's leading chess players. He regularly participated in Brazilian Chess Championships. His best results was three times won silver medals: 1978, 1979, and 1988.

Cícero Braga played for Brazil in the Chess Olympiads:

- In 1978, at fourth board in the 23rd Chess Olympiad in Buenos Aires (+7, =2, -2) and won individual bronze medal,
- In 1988, at first reserve board in the 28th Chess Olympiad in Thessaloniki (+5, =3, -1),
- In 1992, at first reserve board in the 30th Chess Olympiad in Manila (+3, =1, -3),
- In 1996, at third board in the 32nd Chess Olympiad in Yerevan (+6, =3, -5),
- In 2000, at second reserve board in the 34th Chess Olympiad in Istanbul (+4, =1, -2),
- In 2002, at second reserve board in the 35th Chess Olympiad in Bled (+5, =3, -0),
- In 2004, at third board in the 36th Chess Olympiad in Calvià (+2, =6, -3),
- In 2008, at fourth board in the 38th Chess Olympiad in Dresden (+2, =5, -1).

Cícero Braga played for Brazil in the Pan American Team Chess Championships:

- In 1991, at fourth board in the 4th Panamerican Team Chess Championship in Guarapuava (+1, =1, -0) and won team silver medal,
- In 1995, at second reserve board in the 5th Panamerican Team Chess Championship in Cascavel (+1, =1, -0) and won team bronze medal,
- In 2003, at third board in the 7th Panamerican Team Chess Championship in Rio de Janeiro (+0, =2, -0) and won team silver medal.

Cícero Braga played for Brazil in the World Student Team Chess Championship:

- In 1977, at first reserve board in the 22nd World Student Team Chess Championship in Mexico City (+5, =2, -3).

Cícero Braga played for Brazil in the World Youth U26 Team Chess Championship:

- In 1978, at first board in the 1st World Youth U26 Team Chess Championship in Mexico City (+2, =3, -5),
- In 1980, at third board in the 2nd World Youth U26 Team Chess Championship in Mexico City (+6, =2, -5),
- In 1981, at third board in the 3rd World Youth U26 Team Chess Championship in Graz (+2, =4, -3),
- In 1983, at second board in the 4th World Youth U26 Team Chess Championship in Chicago (+2, =7, -1).

In 1991, Cícero Braga was awarded the FIDE International Master (IM) title.
