= José Fernández Migoya =

Cuban chess player (1900–1968)

José Fernández Migoya (1900 – 11 July 1968) was a Cuban chess player. He was the winner of the Cuban Chess Championship in 1923. The national chess tournament Migoya In Memoriam, is named after him. Migoya was born in 1900 in Pinar del Río and died on 11 July 1968 in Camagüey, Cuba.
