= Francisco Planas =

Cuban chess player

Francisco Planas Garcia (born 6 April 1908 - 1990) was a Cuban chess player. He was the winner of the Cuban Chess Championship in 1927 and 1929. Planas was born in Matanzas, Cuba.
