= Silvino García Martínez =

Cuban chess grandmaster (born 1944)

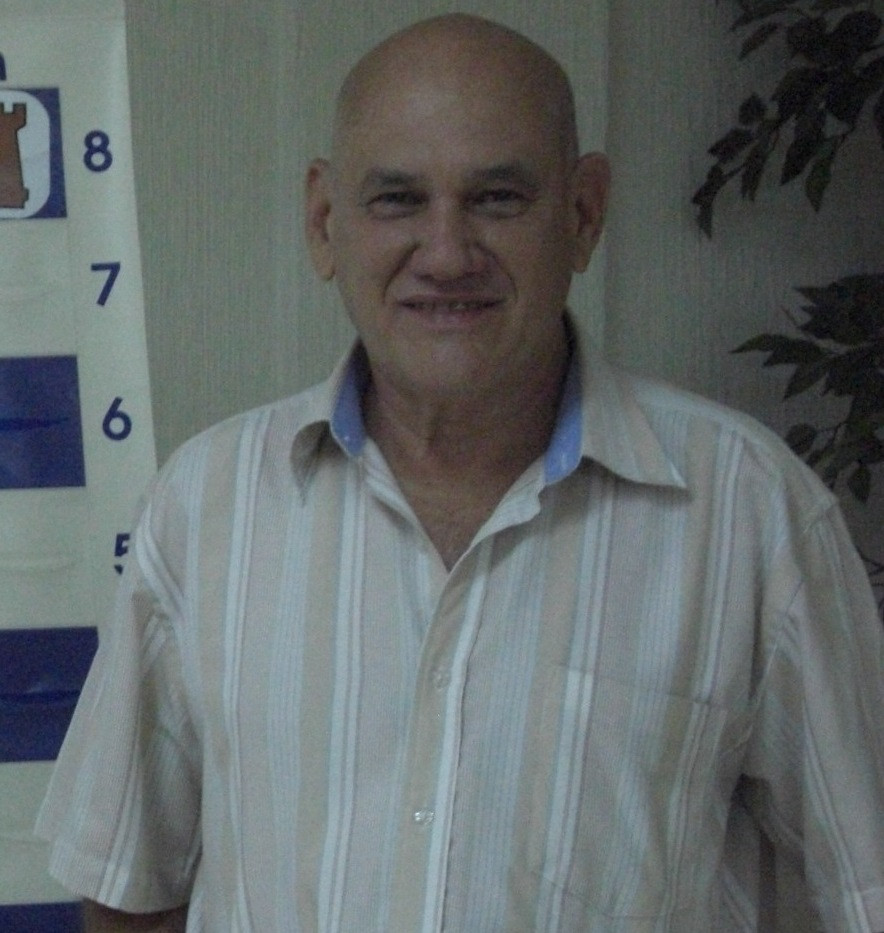
- Silvino García Martínez in 2011

Personal information
- Born: 4 July 1944 (age 82) Havana, Cuba

Chess career
- Country: Cuba
- Title: Grandmaster (1975)
- Peak rating: 2470 (July 1986)

Silvino García Martínez (born 4 July 1944) is a Cuban chess player. He was awarded the title of Grandmaster (GM) by FIDE in 1975. García Martínez is a four-time Cuban champion (1968, 1970, 1973, 1979). He was also Pan American champion in 1968 and won an individual bronze medal at the Chess Olympiad in 1978.

== Biography ==
From the mid-1960s to mid-1980s García Martínez was one of the leading Cuban chess players. He won the Cuban Championship four times: in 1968, 1970, 1973, and 1979. Also in 1968 García Martínez won the Pan American Championship.

His successes in the international chess tournament include, among others: the 1st place in a tournament played in three Cuban cities (Cárdenas, Matanzas and Santa Clara) in 1968, shared 3rd place in Rubinstein Memorial in Polanica-Zdrój (1974), 1st place in Havana (1978), 3rd place in Bayamo (1984), shared 1st place in Medellín (1979), shared 2nd place in Capablanca Memorial in Havana (1985), shared 1st place in Mislata (1999), shared 1st place in Mancha Real (1999) and 2nd place in the Premier tournament of the Capablanca Memorial in Havana (2004).

García Martínez played for Cuba in the Chess Olympiads:

- In 1966, at first reserve board in the 17th Chess Olympiad in Havana (+2, =3, -6),
- In 1968, at second board in the 18th Chess Olympiad in Lugano (+7, =4, -4),
- In 1970, at first board in the 19th Chess Olympiad in Siegen (+2, =8, -6),
- In 1972, at second board in the 20th Chess Olympiad in Skopje (+5, =6, -5),
- In 1974, at second board in the 21st Chess Olympiad in Nice (+5, =8, -3),
- In 1978, at first reserve board in the 23rd Chess Olympiad in Buenos Aires (+6, =4, -1) and won individual bronze medal,
- In 1980, at second board in the 24th Chess Olympiad in La Valletta (+4, =4, -2),
- In 1982, at first reserve board in the 25th Chess Olympiad in Lucerne (+2, =4, -1),
- In 1984, at fourth board in the 26th Chess Olympiad in Thessaloniki (+2, =2, -3),
- In 1986, at fourth board in the 27th Chess Olympiad in Dubai (+2, =7, -0).

García Martínez played for Cuba in the World Student Team Chess Championships:

- In 1963, at second board in the 10th World Student Team Chess Championship in Budva (+6, =1, -4),
- In 1964, at fourth board in the 11th World Student Team Chess Championship in Kraków (+5, =4, -2),
- In 1966, at second board in the 13th World Student Team Chess Championship in Örebro (+5, =3, -2),
- In 1967, at first board in the 14th World Student Team Chess Championship in Harrachov (+2, =4, -5).

García Martínez played for Cuba at second board in the first Pan American Team Chess Championship in Tucumán in 1971 (+2, =3, -1) and won a team silver medal and individual silver medal.

In 1969, García Martínez was awarded the International Master (IM) title by FIDE and received the Grandmaster (GM) title six years later. He is the first chess grandmaster in the history of Cuba. He was awarded the title of FIDE Senior Trainer in 2007.
