= Carlos Garcia Palermo =

Argentine-Italian chess grandmaster (born 1953)

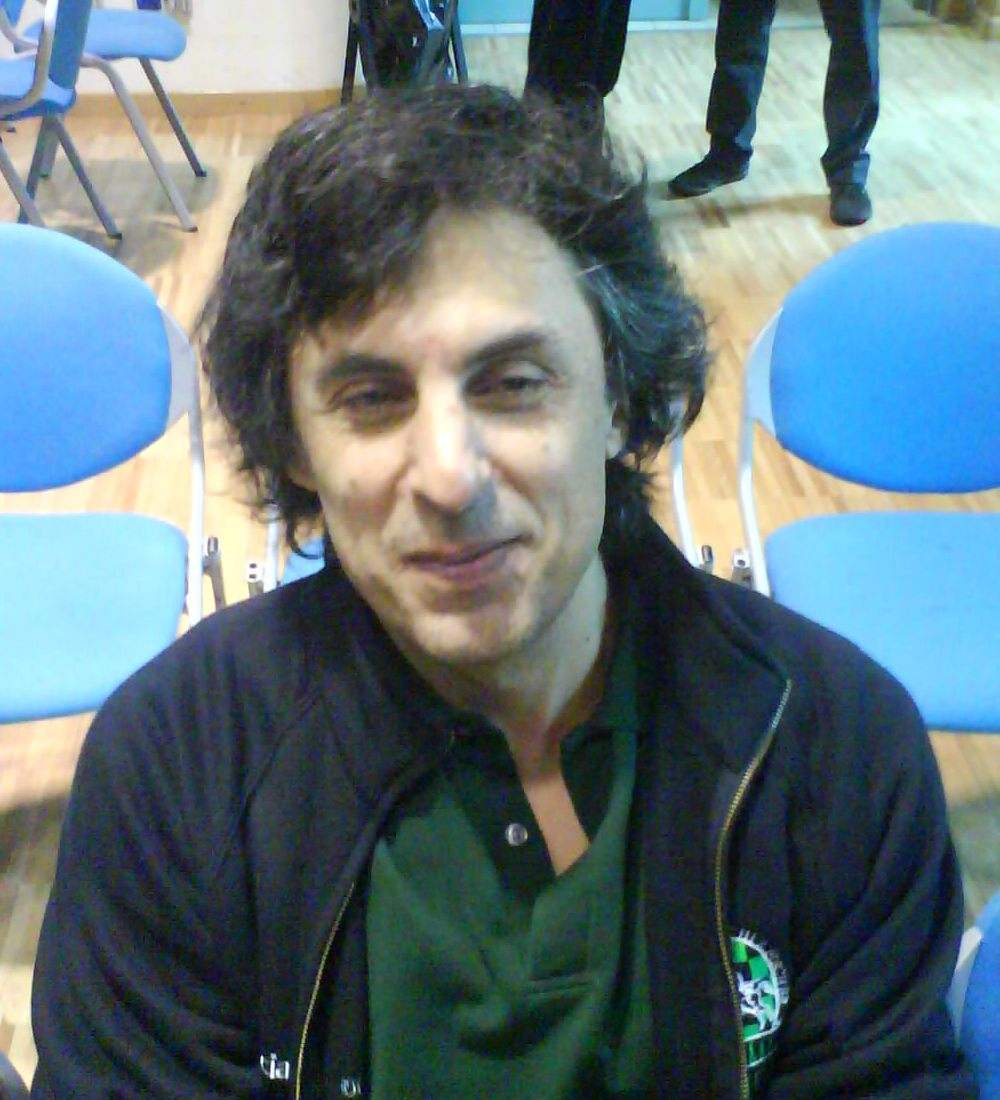
- Palermo in 2009

Personal information
- Born: December 2, 1953 (age 72) La Plata, Argentina

Chess career
- Country: Argentina (until 2005); Italy (since 2005)
- Title: Grandmaster (1985)
- Peak rating: 2550 (January 1986) 39th

Carlos Horacio García Palermo (born 2 December 1953) is an Argentine-Italian chess grandmaster.

== Biography ==
Born in La Plata, at the beginning of his career he defeated Robert James Fischer in a simultaneous display in 1970.

In 1982, he beat then reigning World Chess Champion and number one player of the world, Anatoly Karpov at the prestigious international Clarin tournament, held in Mar del Plata (Jan Timman won). Garcia Palermo is the only Argentine player to have beat a reigning world champion under classic time controls.

He took 2nd-3rd in Rubinstein Memorial at Polanica-Zdrój 1985. He won or shared first place at Bayamo 1983, Capablanca Memorial tournaments in Havana 1985, Havana 1986, and Camaguey 1987, Forli 1988, Canete 1994, La Plata 1998, and Faxinal 2002. In 2004 he took part in the FIDE World Championship, where he was knocked out in the first round by Ye Jiangchuan.

García Palermo represented Argentina in the World Team Chess Championship at Lucerne 1985, and played three times in the Chess Olympiad: for Argentina at Dubai 1986, and for Italy at Manila 1992, Turin 2006.

He was awarded the titles of International Master in 1981 and Grandmaster in 1985.
