= Baire Benítez =

Cuban chess player

Baire Benítez was a Cuban chess player. He won the Cuban Chess Championship in 1921.
