= Sulennis Piña Vega =

Cuban chess player (born 1981)

Personal information
- Born: January 8, 1981 (age 45)

Chess career
- Country: Cuba
- Title: Woman Grandmaster (2002)
- Peak rating: 2358 (January 2006)

Sulennis Piña Vega (born 8 January 1981) is a Cuban chess player holding the FIDE title of Woman Grandmaster (WGM). She won the American Continental Women's Championship in 2001 and 2005. These two victories qualified her to play in the Women's World Chess Championship in 2001 and 2006 respectively. She was knocked out in the first round by Xu Yuanyuan in the former and by Ekaterina Kovalevskaya in the latter. Also in 2006, Piña Vega won the Pan American Women's Championship in San Salvador.

Piña Vega also twice won the Cuban women's championship, in 2005 and 2014. She has played for the Cuban team in the Women's Chess Olympiads since 2002.
