= Yaacov Zilberman =

Israeli chess grandmaster (born 1954)

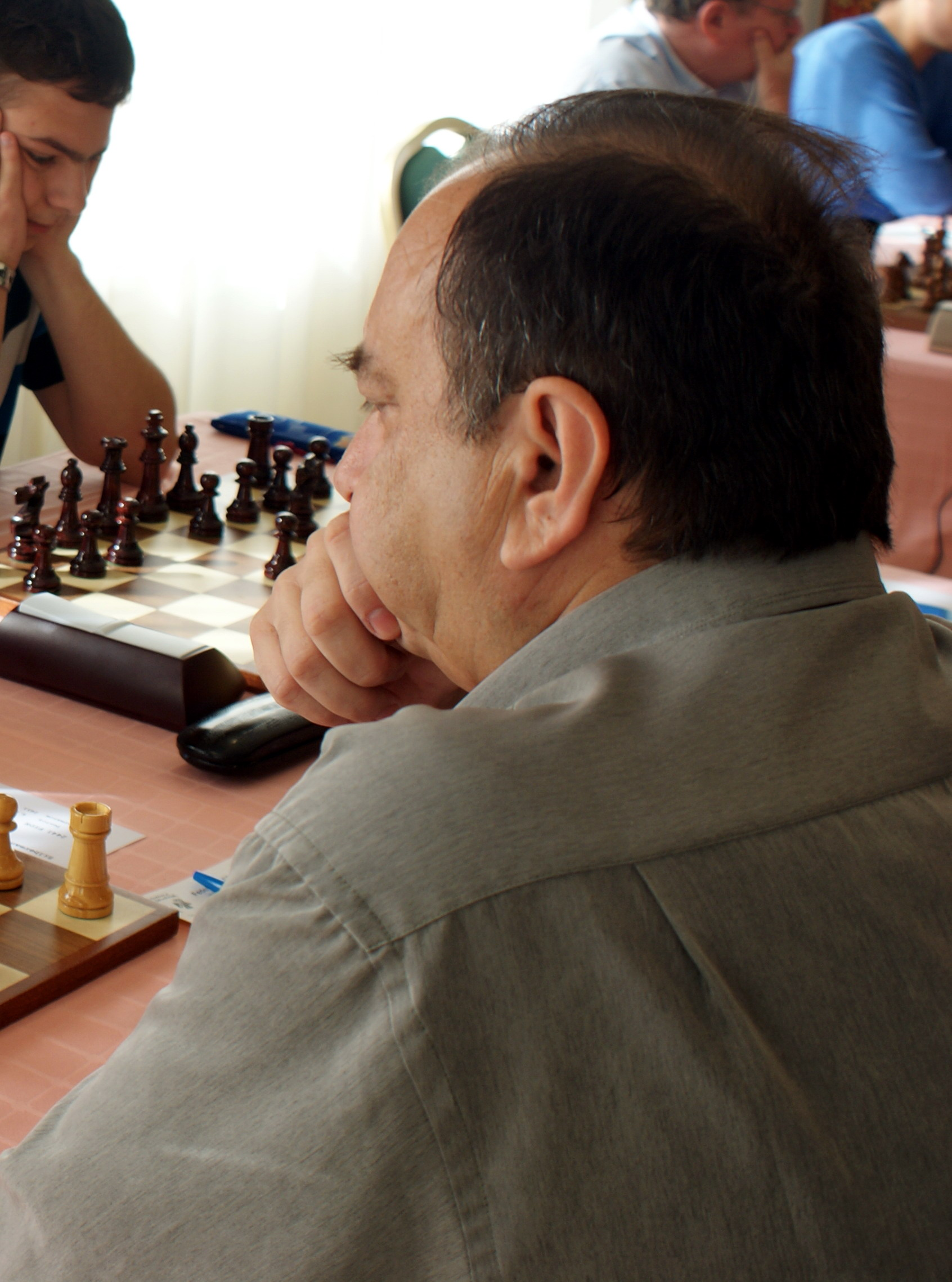
- Zilberman in 2010

Personal information
- Native name: יעקב זילברמן
- Born: May 26, 1954 (age 72) Astana, Kazakh SSR, Soviet Union

Chess career
- Country: Israel (after 1991); Soviet Union (before 1991)
- Title: Grandmaster (1998)
- Peak rating: 2560 (July 1997)

Yaacov Zilberman (Hebrew: יעקב זילברמן; born 26 May 1954) is an Israeli chess grandmaster.

He played for Israel on the second reserve board in the 30th Chess Olympiad at Manila 1992.

He shared first place with Robert Hübner and Iván Morovic Fernández at Havana 1998 (Capablanca Memorial, Elite). He was awarded the Grandmaster title in 1998.

He competed at the 2017 Maccabiah Games.

Three times he played in the European Chess Club Cup, in 1992 with Hapoel Tel Aviv (reaching the semifinals), in 1997 and in 2001 with Herzliya Chess Club.
