= Rafael Blanco =

Cuban chess player

Rafael Blanco Estera
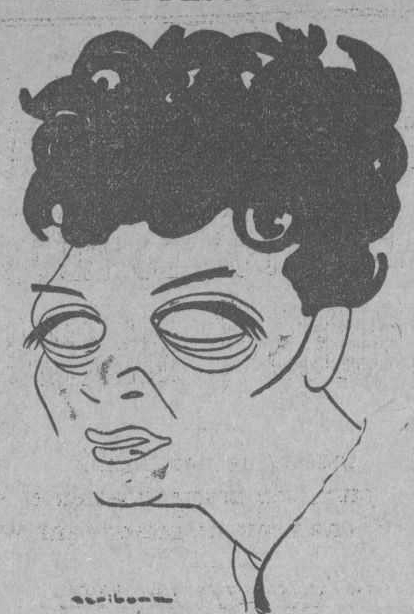

Personal information
- Born: 1 December 1885 Havana, Cuba
- Died: 4 August 1955 (aged 69) Havana, Cuba

Chess career
- Country: Cuba

Rafael Blanco Estera (1 December 1885 – 4 August 1955) was a Cuban painter and chess player, three-times Cuban Chess Championship winner (1914, 1920, 1937).

== Early life ==
Rafael Blanco Estera was born 1 December 1885 in Havana, Cuba. From 1902 to 1905, he studied at Escuela Nacional de Bellas Artes "San Alejandro".

== Art career ==
=== Personal exhibitions ===
- 1912 - exhibition in "Ateneo y Círculo" (Havana);
- 1932 - exhibition "Satirical collection" (Colección Satírica) in Lyceum de La Habana;
- 1956 - posthumous exhibition at the Havana Journalists Association;
- 1980 - "Rafael Blanco and his gouaches" (Rafael Blanco y sus gouaches) in Museo Nacional de Bellas Artes de La Habana;
- 1985 - exhibition dedicated to the 100th anniversary of the birth (Rafael Blanco. Homenaje en el centenario de su nacimiento ) at the National Museum of Fine Arts.

=== Participation in collective exhibitions ===
- 1916 - exhibition "National Salon of Fine Arts. Painting, sculpture and architecture"(Salón Nacional de Bellas Artes. Pintura, Escultura y Arquitectura) at the Cuban Academy of Sciences;
- 1921 - exhibition "1st Salon of Humorists" (Primer Salón de Humoristas) in Havana;
- 1954 - 2nd Hispanic Biennale of Arts (Segunda Bienal Hispanoamericana de Arte) at the National Museum of Fine Arts.

=== Prizes ===
- 1917 - 1st, 2nd, 3rd and 4th Prizes of the magazine Revista La Ilustración;
- 1930 - Gold Medal of the Ibero-American Exhibition (Exposición Iberoamericana) in Seville;
- 1942 - bronze medal of the exhibition "24th Salon of Fine Arts" (XXIV Salón de Bellas Artes) in Círculo de Bellas Artes (Havana);
- 1952 - 2nd prize in the nomination "Personal Caricature" at the exhibition "18th Humorist Salon" (XVIII Salón de Humoristas) in Havana.

== Chess career ==
From the mid-1910s to the late 1930s, Rafael Blanco Estera was one of the leading Cuban chess players. He participated in International Chess Tournament in Havana in 1913. He three times won the Cuban Chess Championship: 1914, 1920, and 1937.

Rafael Blanco Estera played for Cuba in the Chess Olympiad:

- In 1939, at fourth board in the 8th Chess Olympiad in Buenos Aires (+2, =0, -6).
