= Sergio Andres Sanabria Rangel =

Colombian chess player (born 1987)

Personal information
- Born: March 5, 1987 (age 39) San Juan de Girón, Colombia

Chess career
- Country: Colombia
- Title: FIDE Master (2010)
- Peak rating: 2389 (January 2011)

Sergio Andres Sanabria Rangel is a Colombian chess player.

== Career ==
In November 2010, he won the American Continental Championship despite being an untitled player. During the tournament, he defeated grandmasters Andrés Rodríguez Vila and Gildardo García and held draws against grandmasters Darcy Lima and Jorge Cori. He also became the first Colombian player to win the championship.
