= Rogelio Ortega (chess player) =

Cuban chess player

Personal information
- Born: 28 March 1915 Havana, Cuba
- Died: 1980 Havana, Cuba

Chess career
- Country: Cuba

Rogelio Ortega (28 March 1915 — after 1980) was a Cuban chess player, two-times Cuban Chess Championship winner (1958, 1966).

== Biography ==
In the 1960s Rogelio Ortega was one of the leading Cuban chess players. He twice won Cuban Chess Championship in 1958 and 1966. Also Rogelio Ortega was silver medalist of the Cuban Chess Championship in 1969. He was participant in several major international chess tournaments: several Capablanca Memorial, Chigorin Memorial, Lasker Memorial, two Rubinstein Memorial, U.S. Open Chess Championship and others. In 1967, Rogelio Ortega represented Cuba in the Zonal Chess tournament of the World Chess Championship cycle.

Rogelio Ortega played for Cuba in the Chess Olympiads:

- In 1952, at first reserve board in the 10th Chess Olympiad in Helsinki (+5, =1, -6),
- In 1962, at fourth board in the 15th Chess Olympiad in Varna (+11, =3, -5),
- In 1964, at fourth board in the 16th Chess Olympiad in Tel Aviv (+3, =1, -6),
- In 1966, at second board in the 17th Chess Olympiad in Havana (+4, =1, -9),
- In 1968, at first reserve board in the 18th Chess Olympiad in Lugano (+6, =5, -2).
