= Everaldo Matsuura =

Brazilian chess grandmaster (born 1970)

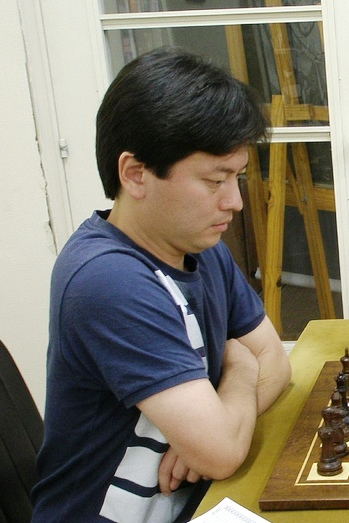
- Matsuura in São Paulo in 2008

Personal information
- Born: October 1, 1970 (age 55) Maringá, Brazil

Chess career
- Country: Brazil
- Title: Grandmaster (2011)
- Peak rating: 2511 (October 2007)

Everaldo Matsuura (born 1 October 1970) is a Brazilian chess player. He was awarded the title Grandmaster by FIDE in 2011.

Born in Maringá, Matsuura won the Brazilian Chess Championship in 1991 and 2016. He won the Pan American Club Championship in 1993 playing for team C. X. Joinville. By finishing 6th in the American Continental Championship in 2007, Matsuura qualified to the FIDE World Cup held later in the same year. He was eliminated from this latter competition in the first round after losing to Sergey Karjakin by 0–2. In 2018 Matsuura won the CXC Brazil Open in Curitiba. Matsuura played on the Brazilian national team at the Chess Olympiad, the Pan American Team Chess Championship, the World Youth U26 Team Chess Championship and the South American Team Chess Championship.
