= Félix Sicre =

Cuban chess player

Félix Sicre (1817 – 1871) was a Cuban chess master.

He became the first Cuban champion in 1860, and lost the title in 1862 match against Celso Golmayo Zúpide. Sicre lost all games to Paul Morphy, during his two visits in Havana in October 1862 and February 1864.
