= Eldis Cobo Arteaga =

Cuban chess player

Personal information
- Born: 2 September 1929 Santiago de Cuba, Cuba
- Died: 1991 (aged 61–62)

Chess career
- Country: Cuba
- Title: International Master (1967)
- Peak rating: 2425 (July 1971)

Eldis Cobo Arteaga (2 September 1929 — 1991) was a Cuban chess International Master (IM) (1967), Cuban Chess Championship winner (1950), U.S. Open Chess Championship winner (1958).

== Biography ==
From the early 1950s to the mid-1970s Eldis Cobo Arteaga was one of the leading Cuban chess players. He won the Cuban Chess Championship in 1950. He won the U.S. Open Chess Championship in 1958 in Rochester.

Eldis Cobo Arteaga played for Cuba in the Chess Olympiads:

- In 1952, at fourth board in the 10th Chess Olympiad in Helsinki (+6, =3, -5),
- In 1960, at second board in the 14th Chess Olympiad in Leipzig (+9, =7, -4),
- In 1962, at second board in the 15th Chess Olympiad in Varna (+9, =8, -3),
- In 1964, at second reserve board in the 16th Chess Olympiad in Tel Aviv (+6, =6, -2),
- In 1966, at third board in the 17th Chess Olympiad in Havana (+4, =10, -3),
- In 1968, at third board in the 18th Chess Olympiad in Lugano (+6, =6, -3),
- In 1970, at third board in the 19th Chess Olympiad in Siegen (+4, =7, -4),
- In 1972, at third board in the 20th Chess Olympiad in Skopje (+4, =9, -3).

Eldis Cobo Arteaga played for Cuba in the Panamerican Team Chess Championship:

- In 1971, at third board in the first Pan American Team Chess Championship in Tucumán (+2, =3, -1) and won a team silver medal and individual bronze medal.

In 1967, Eldis Cobo Arteaga was awarded the FIDE International Master (IM) title.
