= Isan Reynaldo Ortiz Suárez =

Cuban chess grandmaster (born 1985)

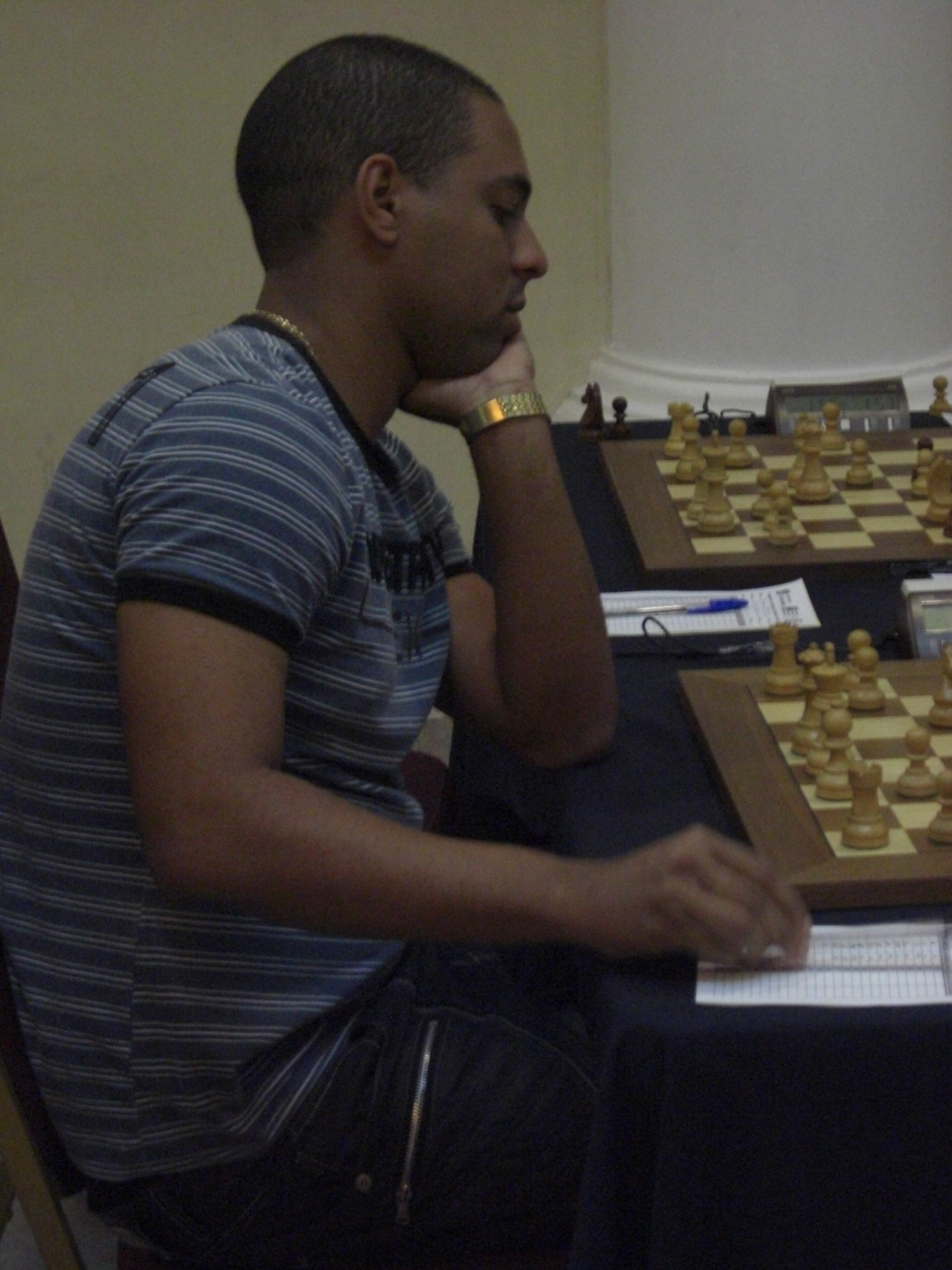

Personal information
- Born: 30 March 1985 (age 41) Guantánamo, Cuba

Chess career
- Country: Cuba
- Title: Grandmaster (2011)
- FIDE rating: 2490 (July 2026)
- Peak rating: 2625 (March 2015)

Isan Reynaldo Ortiz Suárez (born 30 March 1985 in Guantánamo) is a Cuban chess grandmaster. He is a three-time Cuban Chess Champion.

== Chess career ==
He was awarded the Grandmaster title in 2011. Ortiz Suárez won the Cuban Chess Championship in 2013, 2014, and 2015.

He was the runner-up in the American Continental Chess Championship in 2013. At the Chess World Cup 2013 he knocked out Judit Polgár in the first round, then he lost to Maxime Vachier-Lagrave in round two and therefore was eliminated from the competition.

Ortiz Suárez played for the Cuban team in the Chess Olympiads of 2012 and 2014, and World Team Chess Championship of 2015. In the 2014 Chess Olympiad he won the silver medal on board four thanks to his rating performance of 2766 after five wins, two draws and a loss.

In 2019, Ortiz tied for first place at the U.S. Masters Chess Championship.
