= Jennifer Perez Rodriguez =

Paraguayan chess player (born 1987)

Personal information
- Born: July 24, 1987 (age 39) Santa Clara, Cuba

Chess career
- Country: Cuba (until 2014); Paraguay (since 2014)
- Title: Woman Grandmaster (2023)
- Peak rating: 2263 (April 2006)

Jennifer Perez Rodriguez is a Cuban-Paraguayan chess player.

== Career ==
In February 2018, she won the Paraguayan Women's Chess Championship, defeating Gabriela Vargas in a blitz tiebreaker match.

She won the 2022 American Continental Women's Championship.

In March 2023, she finished in fourth place in the Zonal 2.5 Women's tournament with 5.5/9.
