= Guillermo Estévez Morales =

Cuban chess player (born 1947)

Personal information
- Born: 16 October 1947 (age 78)

Chess career
- Country: Cuba
- Title: International Master (1972)
- Peak rating: 2430 (July 1983)

Guillermo Estévez Morales (born 16 October 1947) is a Cuban chess International Master (IM) (1972), Cuban Chess Championship winner (1975).

== Biography ==
In the early 1970s Guillermo Estévez Morales was one of the leading Cuban chess players. He won the Cuban Chess Championship in 1972.

In 1973 in Leningrad Guillermo Estévez Morales participated in the World Chess Championship Interzonal Tournament where ranked in 17th place. In this tournament he won such chess grandmasters as Robert Hübner and Mikhail Tal.

Guillermo Estévez Morales played for Cuba in the Chess Olympiads:

- In 1972, at first reserve board in the 20th Chess Olympiad in Skopje (+2, =4, -3),
- In 1974, at first reserve board in the 21st Chess Olympiad in Nice (+5, =3, -5).

Guillermo Estévez Morales played for Cuba in the World Student Team Chess Championships:

- In 1972, at first board in the 19th World Student Team Chess Championship in Graz (+1, =3, -6),
- In 1974, at second board in the 20th World Student Team Chess Championship in Teesside (+1, =4, -3).

In 1972, Guillermo Estévez Morales was awarded the FIDE International Master (IM) title.
