= Oleiny Linares Nápoles =

Cuban chess player

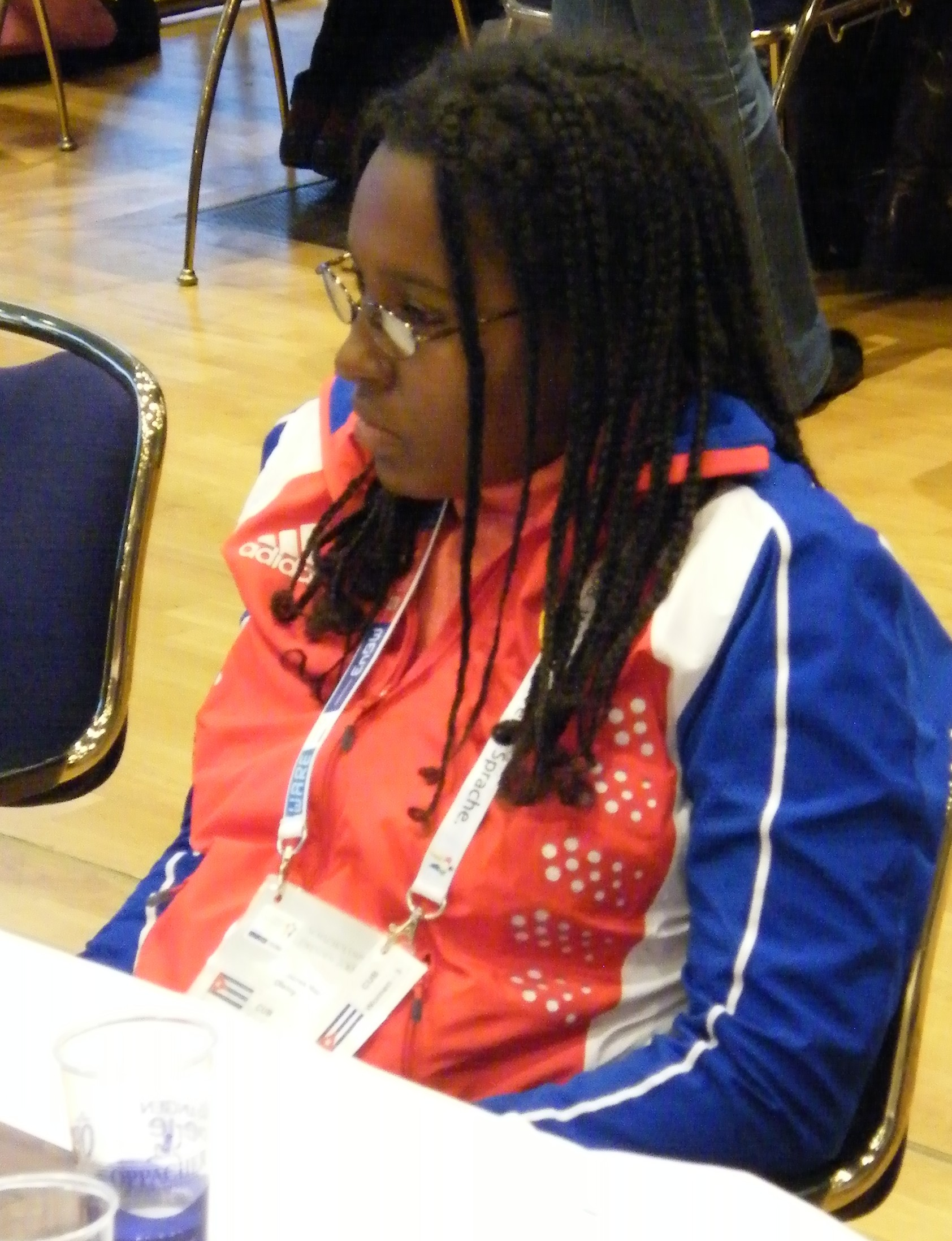

Personal information
- Born: May 9, 1983 (age 43) Havana, Cuba

Chess career
- Country: Cuba
- Title: Woman Grandmaster (2010)
- Peak rating: 2378 (September 2012)

Oleiny Linares Napoles (born 9 May 1983), is a Cuban Woman Grandmaster chess player.

She was the champion of women's chess Cuba in February 2010 and runner-up in 2011, and was the winner of the Cuba junior women's championship in 2003. She won in the Pan-American University Tournament in 2009 and participated representing Cuba in the Chess Olympiad twice, in the years 2008 and 2010.
