= American Continental Championship =

Continental chess tournament

The American Continental Championship, formerly known as the Pan American Chess Championship, is an individual chess tournament organized since 1945. It is often a qualifier for the FIDE World Cup.

== First Pan American championships (1945 and 1954) ==
The first Pan American Chess Championship was held in Hollywood, 28 July – 12 August 1945. The line-up was as follows:

- 1. Samuel Reshevsky United States 10.5,
- 2. Reuben Fine United States 9,
- 3. Hermann Pilnik Argentina 8.5,
- 4. Israel Horowitz United States 8,
- 5. Isaac Kashdan United States 7,
- 6. Héctor Rossetto Argentina 6.5,
- 7–8. Weaver Adams United States, Herman Steiner United States 5.5,
- 9–10. Walter Cruz Brazil, José Joaquin Araiza Mexico 5,
- 11. Jose Broderman Cuba 3.5,
- 12. Herbert Seidman United States 3,
- 13. Joaquin Camarena Mexico 1.

The second championship was held in 1954 in Los Angeles and was an open tournament.

== Winners ==
=== Pan American Championship ===
#	Year	City	Winner
1*	1945	Hollywood	Samuel Reshevsky (USA)
2*	1954	Los Angeles	Arthur Bisguier (USA)
3*	1958	Bogotá	Oscar Panno (ARG)
4*	1963	Havana	Eleazar Jiménez (CUB)
5*	1966	Havana	Eleazar Jiménez (CUB)
6*	1968	Cárdenas	Silvino García Martínez (CUB)
7*	1970	Havana	Eleazar Jiménez (CUB)
1	1974	Winnipeg	Walter Browne (USA)
2	1977	Santa Cruz	Herman Claudius Van Riemsdijk (BRA)
3	1981	San Pedro	Zenon Franco (PAR)
4	1987	La Paz	Pablo Ricardi (ARG)
5	1988	Havana	Juan Borges (CUB)
6	?	?	
7	?	?	
8	1998	San Felipe	Alexander Ivanov (USA)

=== American Continental Chess Championship ===
The American Continental Chess Championship qualified in 2001 and 2003 the top seven players for the FIDE World Championships. From 2005, this tournament has been played as a qualifier for the World Cup stage of the World Championship. The number of players who qualified changed in the various editions. In 2005, the top seven players qualified for the Chess World Cup 2005. In 2014 and 2015 the top four earned a spot in the Chess World Cup 2015.

#	Year	City	# Players	Winner
1	2001	Cali (Colombia)	146	Alex Yermolinsky (USA)
2	2003	Buenos Aires (Argentina)	151	Alexander Goldin (USA)
3	2005	Buenos Aires (Argentina)	152	Lázaro Bruzón (CUB)
4	2007	Cali (Colombia)	116	Julio Granda (PER)
*	2008	Boca Raton (United States)	63	Jaan Ehlvest (USA)
5	2009	São Paulo (Brazil)	270	Alexander Shabalov (USA); Fidel Corrales Jimenez (CUB)
*	2010	Cali (Colombia)	67	Sergio Andres Sanabria Rangel (COL)
6	2011	Toluca (Mexico)	222	Lázaro Bruzón (CUB)
7	2012	Mar del Plata (Argentina)	206	Julio Granda (PER)
8	2013	Cochabamba (Bolivia)	92	Julio Granda (PER)
9	2014	Natal (Brazil)	194	Julio Granda (PER)
10	2015	Montevideo (Uruguay)	163	Sandro Mareco (ARG)
11	2016	San Salvador (El Salvador)	78	Emilio Córdova (PER)
12	2017	Medellín (Colombia)	256	Samuel Sevian (USA)
13	2018	Montevideo (Uruguay)	167	Samuel Shankland (USA)
14	2019	São Paulo (Brazil)	215	Eduardo Iturrizaga Bonelli (VEN)
15	2022	San Salvador (El Salvador)	117	Timur Gareyev (USA)
16	2023	Juan Dolio (Dominican Republic)	158	Georg Meier (URU)
17	2024	Medellín (Colombia)	387	Roberto García Pantoja (COL)
18	2025	Foz do Iguaçu (Brazil)	226	Samuel Shankland (USA)
19	2026	Oaxtepec (Mexico)	126	Samuel Shankland (USA)

*Note: 2008 and 2010 editions' official name was Campeonato Panamericano-Continental, instead of Campeonato Continental de las Americas as the others.

=== American Continental Women's Championship ===
The American Continental Women's Chess Championship serves as a qualifier for the knockout Women's World Chess Championship.

#	Year	City	Winner
1	2001	Mérida (Mexico)	Sulennis Piña Vega (CUB)
2	2003	San Cristobal (Venezuela)	Rusudan Goletiani (USA)
3	2005	Guatemala City	Sulennis Piña Vega (CUB)
4	2007	Potrero de los Funes (Argentina)	Sarai Sanchez Castillo (VEN)*
5	2009	Cali (Colombia)	Martha Fierro (ECU)
6	2011	Guayaquil (Ecuador)	Deysi Cori (PER)
7	2014	Buenos Aires (Argentina)	Carolina Luján (ARG)
8	2015		
9	2016	Lima (Peru)	Deysi Cori (PER)
10	2017	Villa Martelli (Argentina)	Deysi Cori (PER)
11	2018	Envigado (Colombia)	Deysi Cori (PER)
12	2019	Aguascalientes (Mexico)	Maili-Jade Ouellet (CAN)
13	2022	Cuenca (Ecuador)	Jennifer Perez Rodriguez (PAR)*
14	2023	La Habana (Cuba)	Candela Francisco Guecamburu (ARG)
15	2024	Santo Domingo (Dominican Republic)	Atousa Pourkashiyan (USA)
16	2026	Oaxtepec (Mexico)	Candela Francisco Guecamburu (ARG)

- 2007: Marisa Zuriel won the play-off to earn the lone Women's World Championship qualification spot.
- 2022: Lisandra Teresa Ordaz Valdés won the play-off to earn the lone Women's World Cup qualification spot.

=== Pan American Women's Championship ===
#	Year	City	Winner
1	1980	Córdoba	Edith Soppe (ARG)
2	1996	Bogotá	Vivian Ramón (CUB)
3	1997	Mérida	Claudia Amura (ARG)
4	1998	San Felipe	Sabina Hernández Penna (ARG)
5	1999	San Felipe	Yadira Hernández (MEX)
6	2000	Mérida	Maritza Arribas Robaina (CUB)
7	2006	San Salvador	Sulennis Piña Vega (CUB)
8	2008	San Salvador	Zirka Frometa (CUB)
9	2010	Campinas	Yanira Vigoa (CUB)
10	2012	Montevideo	Carla Heredia Serrano (ECU)
11	2014	Palmira	Beatriz Franco (COL)
12	2016	Manzanillo, Colima	Deysi Cori (PER)
