= Juan Corzo =

Spanish-Cuban chess player

Juan Corzo y Príncipe (June 24, 1873 – September 27, 1941) was a Spanish–Cuban chess master and five-time chess champion of Cuba.

Juan Corzo

Born in Madrid, Corzo emigrated to Cuba in 1887. He became Champion of the Havana Chess Club in 1898. He is best known for losing to José Raúl Capablanca (4–3, 6 draws) in 1901 during that great player's meteoric rise, when Capablanca had just turned 13. But Corzo was a force in Cuban chess in his own right. With Capablanca, he founded the National Chess Federation of Cuba, and was a longtime editor of Capablanca's Chess Magazine. He won the Cuban Chess Championship five times (in 1898, 1902, 1907, 1912, and 1918).
