= Celso Golmayo Zúpide =

Spanish-Cuban chess player (1820–1898)

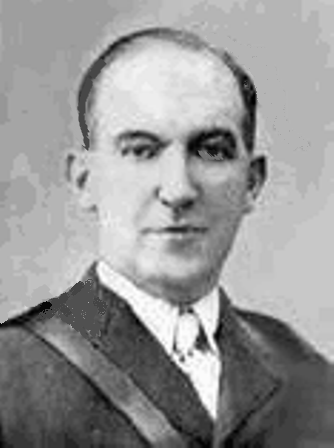
Celso Golmayo y Zúpide.

Celso Golmayo y Zúpide (24 April 1820, in Logroño, Spain – 1 April 1898, in Havana) was a Spanish–Cuban chess master. He was the first Cuban player to participate in European Tournaments.

He had been generally accepted as Cuban champion since his 1862 match defeat of Félix Sicre. He took part in the famous Paris 1867 tournament where he tied for 7–8th (Ignatz von Kolisch won).

In matches, he won against Paul Morphy 3 : 2 at Havana 1864 (blind simultan., Morphy gave odds of a knight); lost to Gustav Neumann 0 : 3 in Paris in 1867; lost twice to Wilhelm Steinitz 2 : 9 in 1883 and 0 : 5 in 1888; won twice against Andrés Clemente Vázquez 7 : 0 in 1887 and 7 : 4 in 1890; lost thrice to George Henry Mackenzie 3 : 6 and 0.5 : 5.5 in 1887; and 4.5 : 7.5 in 1888; lost to Joseph Henry Blackburne 4 : 6 in 1891; and lost to Emanuel Lasker 0.5 : 2.5 in 1893, all in Havana.

Celso Golmayo y Zúpide was the father of Celso Golmayo y de la Torriente and Manuel Golmayo y de la Torriente.

He is also known as the chess teacher of José Raúl Capablanca.
