= Vivian Ramón Pita =

Cuban chess player (born 1963)

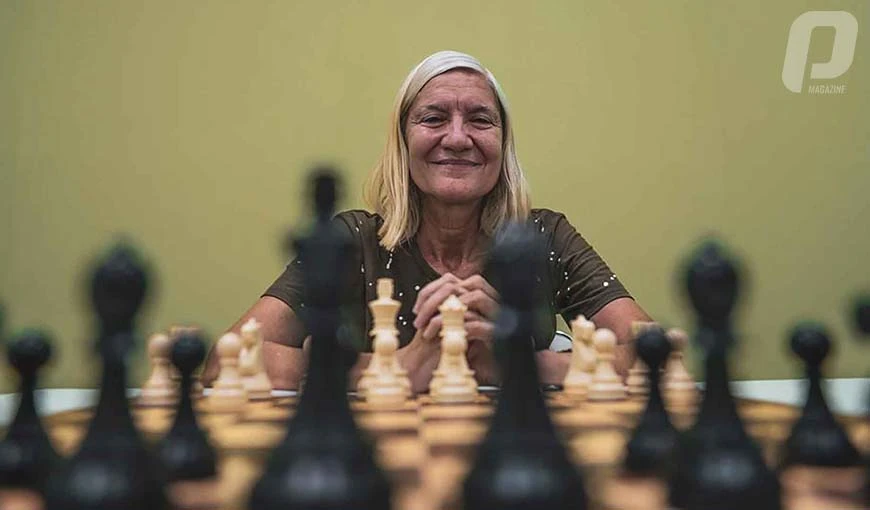

Personal information
- Born: May 2, 1963 (age 63)

Chess career
- Country: Cuba
- Title: Woman Grandmaster (1998)
- Peak rating: 2365 (January 1997)

Vivian Ramón Pita (born 1963) is a Cuban Women's Chess Grandmaster. She was the first Cuban woman to reach the category of Grandmaster in 1998.

== Early life ==
Pita was born in 1963. She began playing chess at age 12 at Neptune and Industry Academy in Havana City. Chess helped her socialize with others who enjoyed the game. She studied at Concepción Arenal.

She learned chess from her brother. Without a proper set, she and her brother improvised chess pieces; she recalls using light switches as rooks.

Eventually, an uncle gifted them a proper chess set, and he began teaching her the basics of the game, always maintaining an edge. She became his chess rival, while he protected his title of household champion.

One day, René asarrate, a prominent figure in the local chess community, visited her school. He invited any interested students to attend.

Discovering that the academy was just half a block from her home, she eagerly joined. Competing against two boys, she emerged victorious, catching the attention of the instructors. They promptly enrolled her, marking the beginning of her love for chess.

== Career ==
Ramón Pita began her professional career and was recognized by FIDE in 1981.

"It was a fortunate coincidence to discover chess. It started as a game. It captivated me, and in the end, no one could separate us."

She achieved the title of Woman International Master (WIM) in 1982.

She became the first Cuban to achieve the title of Women's Grandmaster (WGM) in 1998.

She won the Cuban Women's Chess Championship seven times, in 1982, 1984, 1989, 1990, 1991, 1998, and 2000.

She represented Cuba in the Women's Chess Olympiads on nine occasions:

- 1984 (Placed 1st)
- 1986 (1st)
- 1988(3rd)
- 1990 (1st)
- 1996 (2nd)
- 1998 (1st)
- 2000(2nd)
- 2002 (1st)
- 2004 (1st)

Ramón Pita is a member of the Chess in Education Commission (EDU) and was recognized as a School Instructor in 2022.

== Elo rating ==
Her first recorded Elo rating was in January 1981, scoring 1865. Her peak Elo rating was achieved in January 1997, reaching 2365. As of April 2024, her Elo rating was 2055.

== Personal life ==
Ramón Pita collaborates with chess as a member of the Cuban Chess Federation.

She is a professor at the Latin American Chess Institute (located at UCCFD). She teaches at the University of Physical Culture Manuel Fajardo (UCCFD). She promotes the game in Cuba.

Ramón Pita has written books, including Capablanca: Pact with Immortality, which provides commentary on the impact that José Raúl Capablanca had on Cuba and how he contributed to the increased popularity of the game of chess.
