= Asela de Armas Pérez =

Cuban chess player (1954–2021)

Personal information
- Born: 6 December 1954
- Died: 7 July 2021 (aged 66)

Chess career
- Country: Cuba
- Title: Woman International Master (1978)
- Peak rating: 2255 (January 1989)

Asela de Armas Pérez (6 December 1954 – 7 July 2021) was a Cuban chess player who held the FIDE title of Woman International Master (1978). She was a ten-time winner of the Cuban Women's Chess Championship (1971, 1973, 1974, 1975, 1976, 1977, 1978, 1979, 1986, 1988).

== Biography ==
From the early 1970s to the late 1980s, she was one of the leading Cuban women's chess players. Asela de Armas Pérez won the Cuban Women's Chess Championships ten times: 1971, 1973, 1974, 1975, 1976, 1977, 1978, 1979, 1986, 1988. In 1978, she was awarded the FIDE Woman International Master (WIM) title.

Asela de Armas Pérez three times participated in the Women's World Chess Championship Interzonal Tournaments:

- In 1979, at Interzonal Tournament in Alicante shared 11th-12th place;
- In 1985, at Interzonal Tournament in Havana shared 11th-12th place;
- In 1987, at Interzonal Tournament in Smederevska Palanka has ranked 14th place.

Asela de Armas Pérez played for Cuba in the Women's Chess Olympiads:

- In 1984, at second board in the 26th Chess Olympiad (women) in Thessaloniki (+2, =5, -4),
- In 1986, at second board in the 27th Chess Olympiad (women) in Dubai (+3, =5, -4),
- In 1988, at first board in the 28th Chess Olympiad (women) in Thessaloniki (+3, =1, -6),
- In 1990, at second board in the 29th Chess Olympiad (women) in Novi Sad (+3, =2, -3).

== FIDE ratings ==
Elo development
View chart definition.
