= Leinier Domínguez =

Cuban chess grandmaster (born 1983)

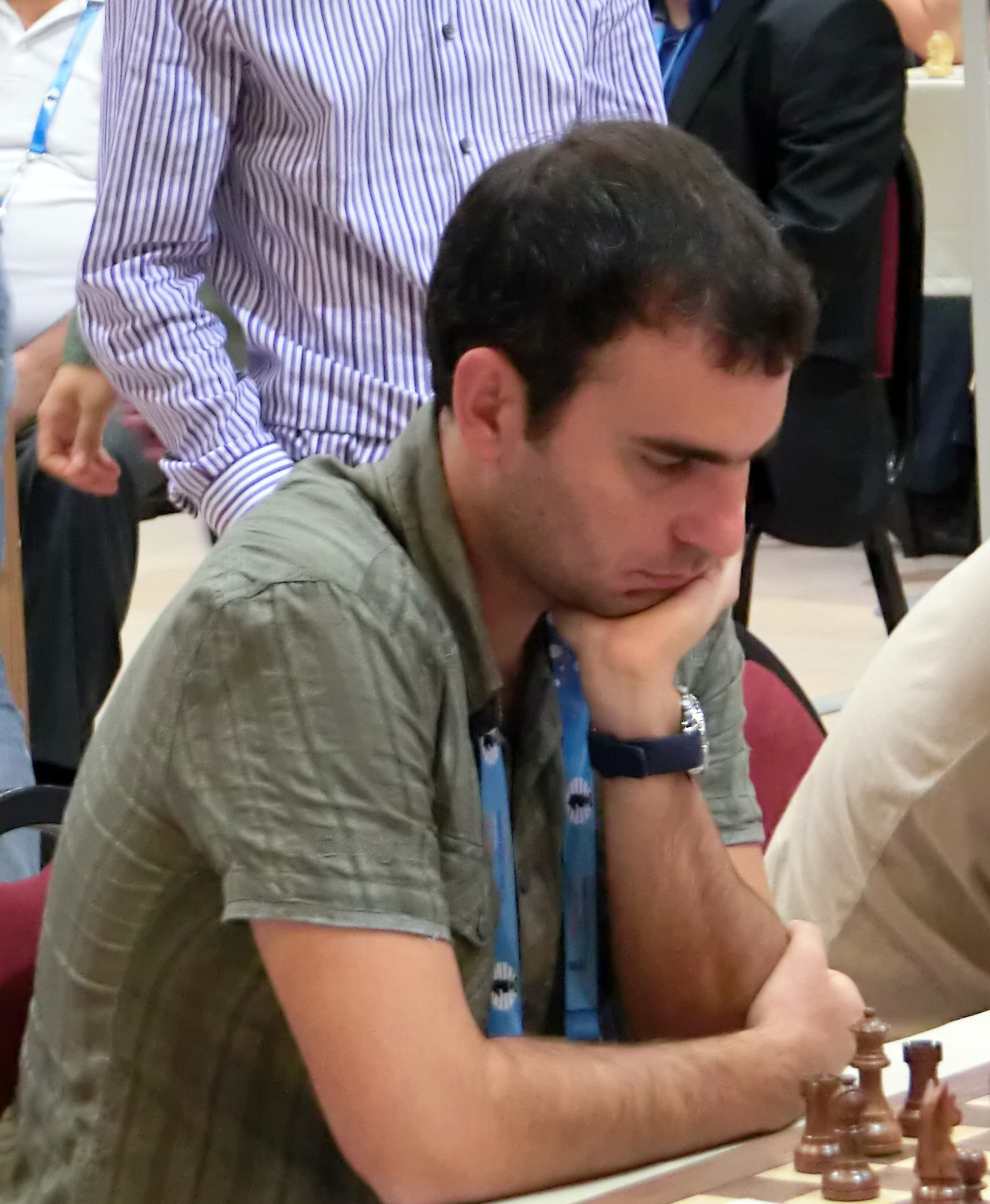
- Domínguez in 2012

Personal information
- Born: Leinier Domínguez Pérez; September 23, 1983 (age 43) Havana, Cuba

Chess career
- Country: Cuba (until 2018); United States (since 2018)
- Title: Grandmaster (2001)
- FIDE rating: 2732 (November 2026)
- Peak rating: 2768 (May 2014)
- Ranking: No. 15 (November 2026)
- Peak ranking: No. 8 (January 2024)

Leinier Domínguez Pérez (born September 23, 1983) is a Cuban chess grandmaster who has represented the United States since 2018. A five-time Cuban champion, Domínguez was the world champion in blitz chess in 2008. He competed in the FIDE World Chess Championship in 2002 and 2004, and the FIDE World Cup in 2007, 2009, 2011, 2013, 2015, 2019, 2021, and 2023.

== Career ==
Domínguez won the Carlos Torre Repetto Memorial in Mérida, Yucatán, Mexico in 2001. He won the Cuban Chess Championship in 2002, 2003, 2006, 2012 and 2016. Also in 2002, he shared first place with Lázaro Bruzón in the North Sea Cup in Esbjerg, Denmark.

During the FIDE World Chess Championship 2004 he reached the quarterfinals, losing to Teimour Radjabov in the tie-break. In the same year, Domínguez Pérez won the Capablanca Memorial for the first time. He won this tournament also in 2008 and 2009.

In 2006, Domínguez won the Magistral Ciutat de Barcelona tournament in Barcelona scoring 8/9 points, ahead of Vasyl Ivanchuk, with a performance rating of 2932. In 2008, he won the "CPA" chess tournament and the 43rd Capablanca Memorial tournament. In the same year, he tied for first with Evgeny Alekseev at the Biel Chess Festival, ahead of Magnus Carlsen. Domínguez Pérez finished second after losing the playoff. On November 8, 2008 Domínguez Pérez won the World Blitz Championship, held at Almaty in Kazakhstan, scoring 11½ points out of 15, ahead of Vassily Ivanchuk, Peter Svidler, Alexander Grischuk and many other top grandmasters.

In June 2013 he won the FIDE Grand Prix event in Thessaloniki as a clear first in a field of twelve elite players, among them Fabiano Caruana, Veselin Topalov and Alexander Grischuk. In 2016, Domínguez Pérez shared 2nd−4th places at the Dortmund Sparkassen Chess Meeting with Vladimir Kramnik and Fabiano Caruana. Later in the same year, he won the individual silver medal playing board one for the Cuban team in the 42nd Chess Olympiad in Baku.

He was a second for Fabiano Caruana in the 2018 World Chess Championship

In December 2018, Domínguez Pérez transferred federations to represent the United States.

Through February and March 2022, Domínguez played in the FIDE Grand Prix 2022. In the first leg, he won his pool with a 4/6 result by also defeating Wesley So in rapid tiebreakers. In the third leg, he finished third in Pool B with a result of 3/6, finishing eighth in the standings with nine points.

In April 2022 he participated in the American Cup. He won the 2nd place in the 2019 U.S. Chess Championship and 3rd place in the 2022 U.S. Chess Championship.

Domínguez won 2nd place in the 2023 Sinquefield Cup. He served as a replacement for Ding Liren, who withdrew from the competition in the weeks leading up to the event.

== Notable games ==
- Magnus Carlsen vs Leinier Dominguez-Perez, Biel 2008, Sicilian Defense: Najdorf Variation, Adams Attack (B90), ½–½
- Alexander Onischuk vs Leinier Dominguez-Perez, Biel, 2008, Gruenfeld Defense: Russian, Hungarian Variation (D97), 0-1
- Evgeny Alekseev vs Leinier Dominguez-Perez, Biel 2008, Sicilian Defense: Najdorf, Zagreb Variation (B91), 0-1
- Leinier Dominguez-Perez vs Alexander Morozevich, Corus 2009, Sicilian Defense: Najdorf Variation, English Attack (B90), 1-0

Achievements
Preceded by Vassily Ivanchuk	World Blitz Chess Champion; 2008	Succeeded by Magnus Carlsen
