= Celso Golmayo Torriente =

Cuban-Spanish chess player (1879–1924)

Celso (Celsito) Golmayo y de la Torriente (1879, in Havana – 22 January 1924, in Seville) was a Cuban–Spanish chess master.

He was the son of Celso Golmayo y Zúpide and the brother of Manuel Golmayo y de la Torriente.

Celsito Golmayo won the 1897 Cuban championship in Havana after a play-off against Andrés Clemente Vázquez. In that tournament Enrique Ostolaza came third, Juan Corzo fourth and Manuel Golmayo fifth. Golmayo's victory was unusual because national championship were rarely won by teenagers in the 19th century.
