= Reynaldo Vera González-Quevedo =

Cuban chess grandmaster (born 1961)

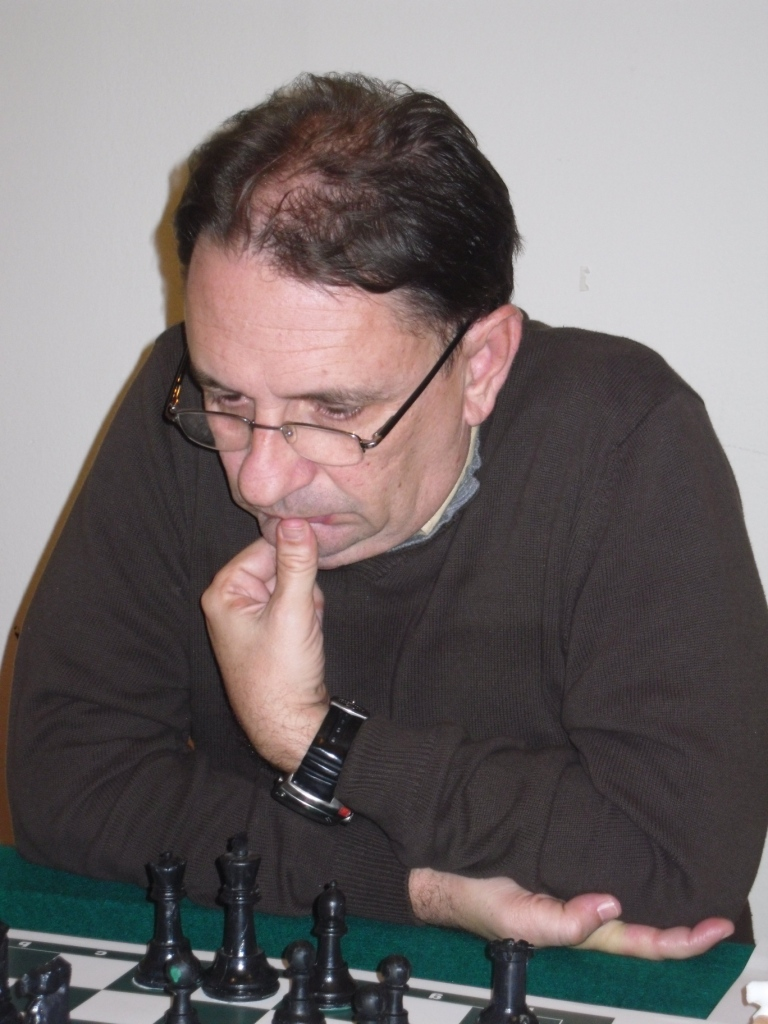
- Reynaldo Vera González-Quevedo in 2008

Personal information
- Born: 7 January 1961 (age 65) Unión de Reyes, Cuba

Chess career
- Country: Cuba
- Title: Grandmaster (1988)
- Peak rating: 2584 (July 2000)

Reynaldo Vera González-Quevedo (born 7 January 1961) is a Cuban chess Grandmaster (GM) (1988), two-times Cuban Chess Championship winner (1997, 2001), Chess Olympiad individual gold medal winner (1998).

== Biography ==
First international success Reynaldo Vera González-Quevedo have in 1977 in Innsbruck, where he ranked 4th in World Junior Chess Championship. He is multiple participant of Cuban Chess Championship and two-time winner of these tournaments (1997, 2001). Reynaldo Vera González-Quevedo has achieved many successes on the international chess tournaments, including winning or shared the first places in Havana (1980), Varna (1986), León (1996), San Sebastián (2007).

Reynaldo Vera González-Quevedo played for Cuba in the Chess Olympiads:

- In 1980, at second reserve board in the 24th Chess Olympiad in La Valletta (+3, =1, -2),
- In 1984, at second reserve board in the 26th Chess Olympiad in Thessaloniki (+1, =3, -1),
- In 1986, at first reserve board in the 27th Chess Olympiad in Dubai (+3, =5, -1),
- In 1988, at first reserve board in the 28th Chess Olympiad in Thessaloniki (+2, =3, -3),
- In 1990, at fourth board in the 29th Chess Olympiad in Novi Sad (+3, =3, -4),
- In 1994, at third board in the 31st Chess Olympiad in Moscow (+1, =5, -1),
- In 1996, at first reserve board in the 32nd Chess Olympiad in Yerevan (+3, =4, -0),
- In 1998, at third board in the 33rd Chess Olympiad in Elista (+5, =4, -0) and won individual gold medal,
- In 2000, at second board in the 34th Chess Olympiad in Istanbul (+0, =2, -3),
- In 2002, at third board in the 35th Chess Olympiad in Bled (+3, =6, -0).

Reynaldo Vera González-Quevedo played for Cuba in the World Team Chess Championships:

- In 1989, at fourth board in the 2nd World Team Chess Championship in Lucerne (+2, =2, -2),
- In 1993, at second board in the 3rd World Team Chess Championship in Lucerne (+2, =4, -3),
- In 1997, at fourth board in the 4th World Team Chess Championship in Lucerne (+2, =3, -1),
- In 2001, at second board in the 5th World Team Chess Championship in Yerevan (+0, =5, -3).

Reynaldo Vera González-Quevedo played for Cuba in four Pan American Team Chess Championships:

- In 1987, at fourth board in the 3rd Pan American Team Chess Championship in Junín (+3, =3, -1) and won team gold and individual silver medals,
- In 1991, at fourth board in the 4th Pan American Team Chess Championship in Guarapuava (+3, =1, -1) and won team and individual gold medals,
- In 1995, at third board in the 5th Pan American Team Chess Championship in Cascavel (+1, =1, -1) and won team gold medal,
- In 2000, at first board in the 6th Pan American Team Chess Championship in Mérida (+1, =3, -0) and won team gold and individual silver medals.

Reynaldo Vera González-Quevedo played for Cuba in the World Youth U26 Team Chess Championships:

- In 1978, at first reserve board in the 1st World Youth U26 Team Chess Championship in Mexico City (+1, =0, -2) and won team bronze medal,
- In 1980, at third board in the 2nd World Youth U26 Team Chess Championship in Mexico City (+4, =2, -4).

In 1979, he was awarded the FIDE International Master (IM) title and in 1988 he received the FIDE Grandmaster (GM) title. Reynaldo Vera González-Quevedo also is FIDE Senior Trainer (2007).
