= Manuel Golmayo Torriente =

Spanish chess master (1883–1973)

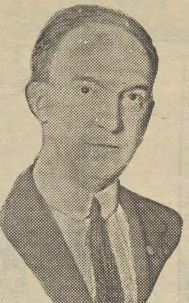
- Golmayo Torriente in 1928

Personal information
- Born: Manuel Golmayo y de la Torriente; 12 June 1883 Havana, Spanish Cuba
- Died: 7 March 1973 (aged 89) Madrid, Spain

Manuel Golmayo y de la Torriente (12 June 1883 – 7 March 1973) was a Spanish chess master.

Born into a 'chess family' (father Celso Golmayo Zúpide, elder brother Celso Golmayo Torriente), he was Spanish Champion on numerous occasions (1902, 1912, 1919, 1921, 1927, 1928) and Sub-Champion in 1929/30 (he lost the title in a match (+1 –4 =2) to Ramón Rey Ardid.

In 1922, he lost a mini match to Alexander Alekhine (+0 –1 =1) in Madrid. In 1924, he took 8th in first unofficial Chess Olympiad (Championship Final) at Paris 1924 (Hermanis Matisons won). In 1928, he took 4th in the Amateur World Championship in The Hague (Max Euwe won).

He played for Spain in three official Chess Olympiads:

- In 1927, at first board in 1st Chess Olympiad in London (+2 –4 =9);
- In 1930, at second board in 3rd Chess Olympiad in Hamburg (+3 –4 =3);
- In 1931, at first board in 4th Chess Olympiad in Prague (+3 –5 =7).

In tournaments, he took 6th at Barcelona 1929 (José Raúl Capablanca won), took 7th at Sitges 1934 (Andor Lilienthal won), took 3rd at Madrid 1934 (Torneo Gromer), took 4th at Paris 1938 (L'Echiquier, Baldur Hönlinger won), tied for 9-10th at Barcelona 1946 (Miguel Najdorf won), took 6th at Gijon 1948 (Antonio Rico won), tied for 8-9th at Almeria 1948, and won both at Madrid 1947 and Linares 1951.

In 1951, FIDE awarded Golmayo the title International Arbiter.
