= André Diamant =

Brazilian chess grandmaster (born 1990)

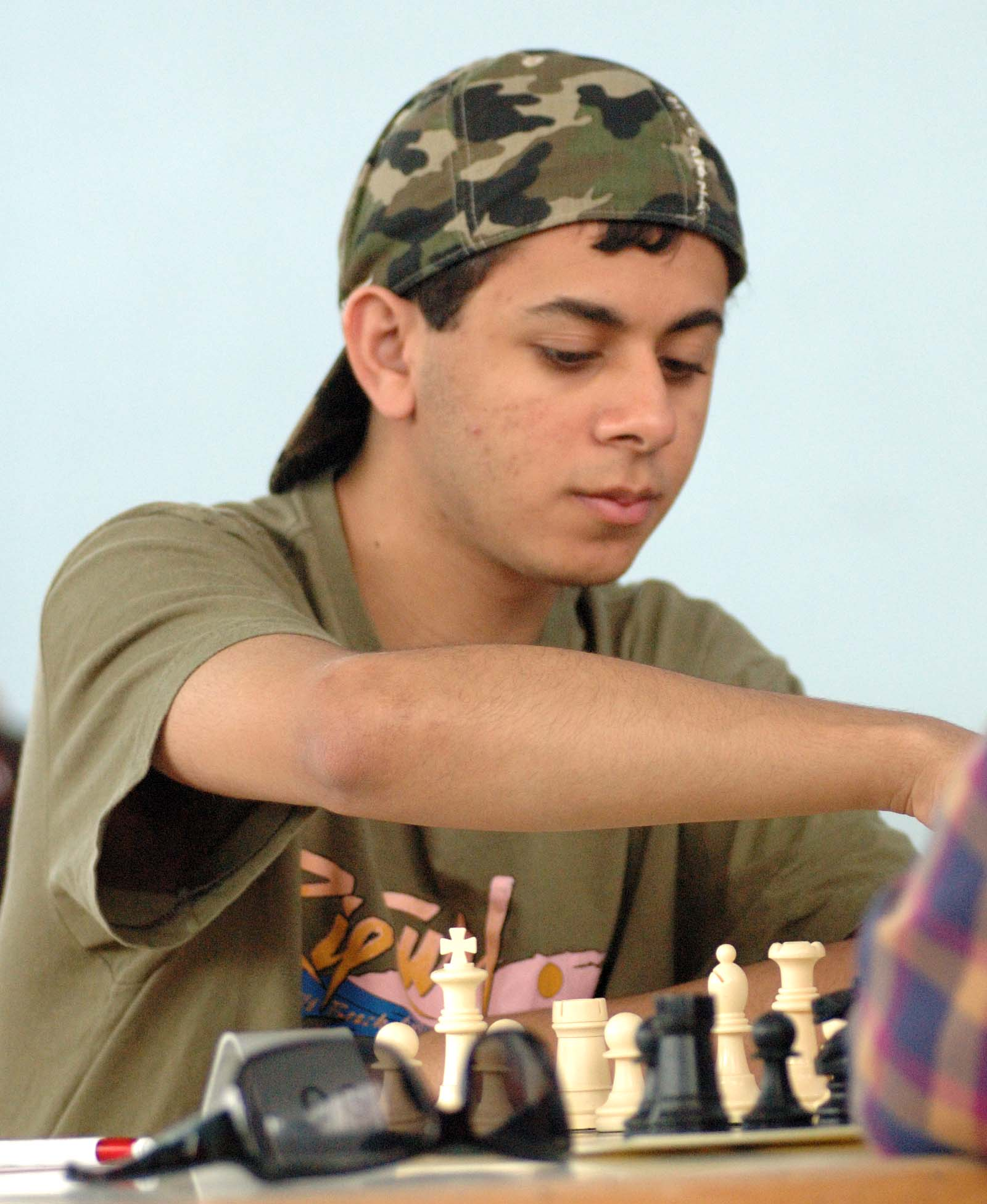
- André Diamant, Madrid 2008

Personal information
- Born: 9 February 1990 (age 36) Fortaleza, Brazil

Chess career
- Country: Brazil
- Title: Grandmaster (2009)
- FIDE rating: 2504 (July 2026)
- Peak rating: 2547 (January 2020)

André Diamant (born February 9, 1990) is a Brazilian chess Grandmaster. He won the Brazilian Chess Championship in 2008 and 2009 and played for Brazil in the Chess Olympiads of 2008 and 2010.

Diamant is of Jewish origin and represents the club A Hebraica (São Paulo). His peak Elo rating was 2547.

== Notable games ==
- Robert Kempinski vs Andre Diamant, Essent 2008, Queen's Gambit Accepted: Classical Defense, Steinitz Development Variation (D26), 0-1
Kempinski vs. Diamant, Essent 2008

Position: h2 white king, h3 white pawn, c3 white queen, b3 white pawn, a3 white pawn, h4 black queen, g4 white pawn, f4 white rook, e4 white pawn, d4 black pawn, c4 white knight, b5 black pawn, c6 black rook, a6 black pawn, g7 black pawn, f7 black pawn, g8 black king, f8 black rook

Final position
