= Juan Borges Matos =

Cuban chess grandmaster (born 1966)

Personal information
- Born: March 28, 1966 (age 60)

Chess career
- Country: Cuba
- Title: Grandmaster (2004)
- Peak rating: 2535 (July 1988)
- Peak ranking: No. 79 (July 1988)

Juan Borges Matos (born March 28, 1966) is a Cuban chess grandmaster. He became a grandmaster in 2004. He played in the 1995 Pan American Team Chess Championship for the Cuban team, which won first place. He achieved his highest rating of 2535 (ranked number 79) in July 1988.
