= Julio Becerra Rivero =

Cuban-American chess grandmaster (born 1973)

Julio Becerra
Personal information
- Born: Julio de Jésus Becerra Rivero; October 15, 1973 (age 52) Centro Habana, Havana, Cuba

Chess career
- Country: Cuba (until 1999); United States (since 1999)
- Title: Grandmaster (1997)
- Peak rating: 2614 (January 2009)

Julio Becerra Rivero (born October 15, 1973) is a Cuban-born American chess Grandmaster who lives in South Miami, Florida.

== Biography ==
Julio Becerra was born and grew up in Havana, Cuba. He learned to play chess when he was thirteen years old. Julio Becerra went to the chess academy in Havana frequently to play games with others and to improve. He became a grandmaster at the age of 23 in 1997. Julio Becerra won the Cuban Chess Championship in 1996 and 1998 and played in the Chess Olympiads of 1994, 1996 and 1998. He stayed in the U.S. in 1999, after playing in the FIDE World Chess Championship 1999 in Las Vegas. He lived in Las Vegas, North Carolina and New York until he moved to Miami in 2004. He was MVP in the U.S. Chess League in 2006. He became the Florida Champion in 2006, and held that title through 2009. He won his 8th Florida Championship in 2016. Julio Becerra is a chess teacher and an active tournament player in Florida. He currently has over 20 private students. He also played for the Miami Sharks in the U.S. Chess League.

As a user of chess.com, Becerra was noticed by many for his willingness to play games against people considerably weaker than himself, thus giving many novice and amateur players the chance to play against a grandmaster. As a result of this, a fan club was set up in his honor.

Julio Becerra also has an even score against Hikaru Nakamura and Wesley So (two of the top chess players in the United States).
