= Jesús Nogueiras =

Cuban chess grandmaster (born 1959)

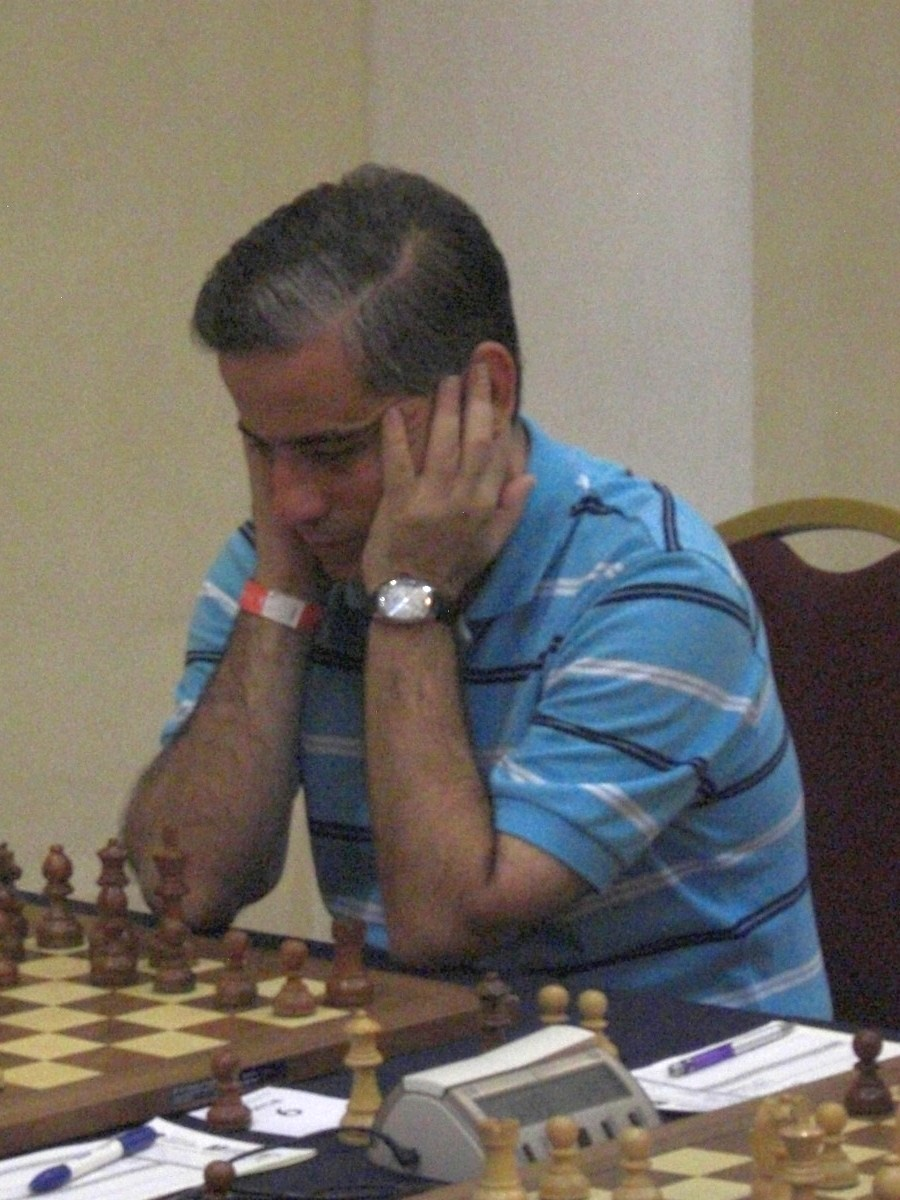

Personal information
- Born: July 17, 1959 (age 66) Santa Clara, Cuba

Chess career
- Country: Cuba
- Title: Grandmaster (1979)
- FIDE rating: 2447 (July 2026)
- Peak rating: 2580 (July 1993)
- Peak ranking: No. 24 (January 1986)

Jesús Nogueiras Santiago (born in Santa Clara, Cuba, July 17, 1959) is a Cuban chess grandmaster. He was a World Championship Candidate in 1985, finishing 2nd at the Taxco 1985 Interzonal, but 15th out of 16 at the 1985 Candidates Tournament.

Major tournament victories include winning the Cuban Chess Championship five times (1977 (tie), 1978, 1984 (tie), 1991, and 2000) the Capablanca Memorial in 1984 and the Torre Memorial in 1997.
