= Walter Arencibia =

Cuban chess grandmaster (born 1967)

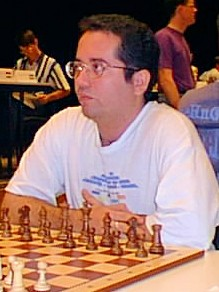
- Walter Arencibia (1998)

Personal information
- Born: July 21, 1967 (age 58) Holguín, Cuba

Chess career
- Country: Cuba
- Title: Grandmaster (1990)
- FIDE rating: 2486 (July 2026)
- Peak rating: 2573 (January 2008)
- Peak ranking: No. 72 (July 1990)

Walter Arencibia Rodríguez (born July 21, 1967) is a Cuban chess grandmaster.

He learned chess at the age of eight and has won various tournaments, including the 1986 World Junior Chess Championship, for which he automatically gained the International Master title. Also in 1986, Rodríguez won the Pan American Junior Chess Championship. He was awarded the title of Grandmaster in 1990. Other tournament victories include the Cuban Youth Championships in 1985, and equal first in the Canadian Open Chess Championship in 2006 and 2011. He has represented Cuba in nine Chess Olympiads from 1986 to 2006.
