= Yuniesky Quesada =

Cuban chess grandmaster (born 1984)

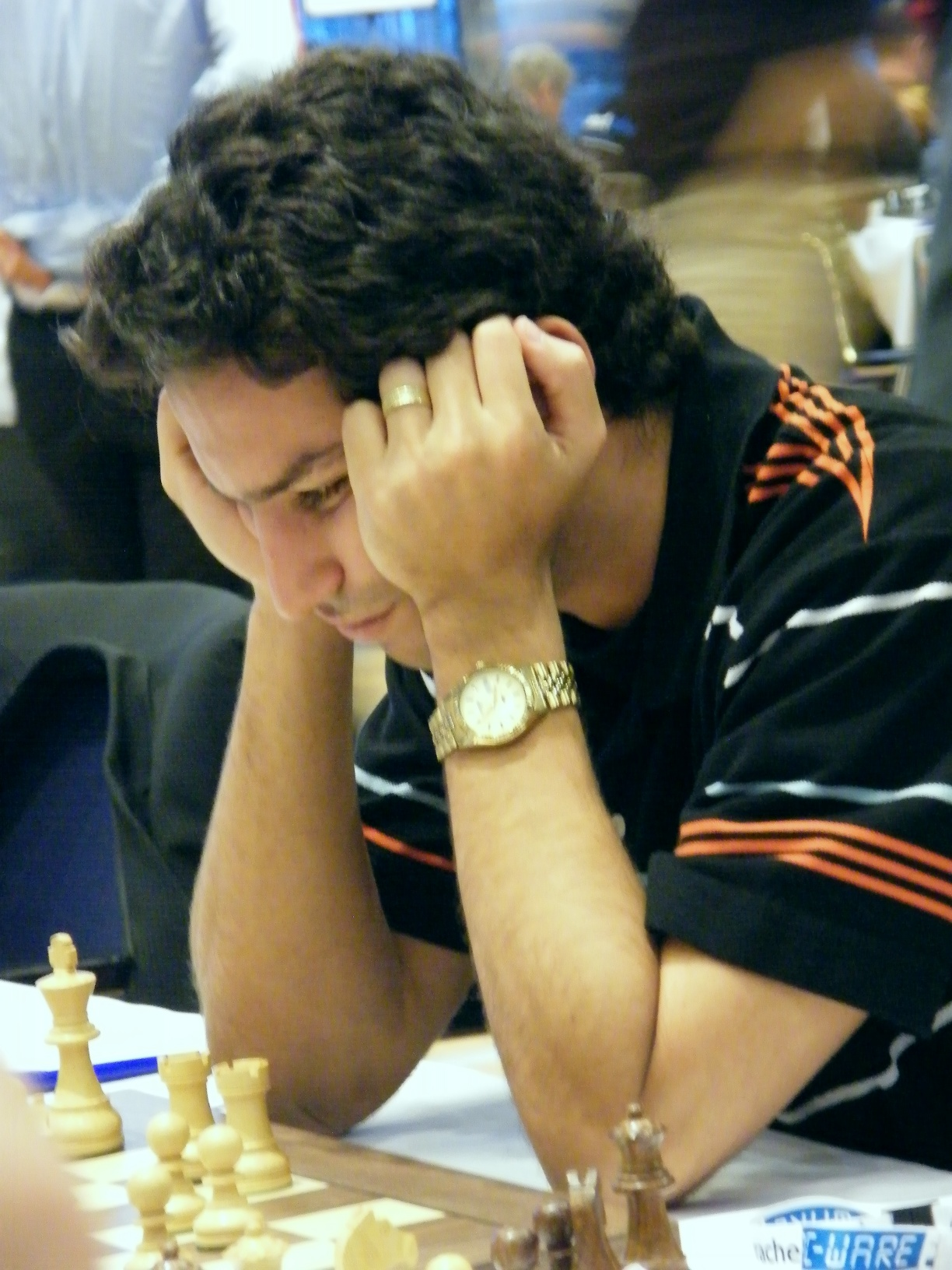
- Quesada at the 2008 Chess Olympiad

Personal information
- Born: Yuniesky Quesada Pérez; July 31, 1984 (age 41) Santa Clara, Cuba

Chess career
- Country: Cuba (until 2019); United States (since 2019)
- Title: Grandmaster (2005)
- FIDE rating: 2591 (July 2026)
- Peak rating: 2655 (July 2014)
- Peak ranking: No. 96 (July 2014)

Yuniesky Quesada Pérez (born July 31, 1984) is a Cuban-American chess player. He was awarded the title of Grandmaster by FIDE in 2005. Quesada is the fourth Cuban to surpass the 2600 Elo rating mark, which he did on the FIDE list of July 2010. He won the Cuban Chess Championship in 2008 and 2011.

In April 2015, Quesada won the Philadelphia Open edging out Ioan-Cristian Chirila on tiebreak score.

== Family ==
His younger brother, Yasser Quesada Pérez, is also a Grandmaster.
