= Guillermo García González =

Cuban chess grandmaster (1953–1990)

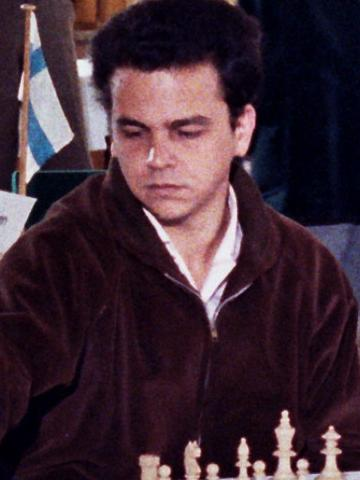
- García González in 1981

Personal information
- Born: 9 December 1953 Santa Clara, Cuba
- Died: 26 October 1990 (aged 36) Havana, Cuba

Chess career
- Country: Cuba
- Title: Grandmaster (1976)
- Peak rating: 2585 (January 1978)
- Peak ranking: No. 50 (January 1978)

Guillermo García González (9 December 1953 in Santa Clara – 26 October 1990 in Havana) was a Cuban chess Grandmaster. He died in a car accident.
