= Capablanca Memorial =

Chess tournament

The Capablanca Memorial is a chess tournament that has been held annually in Cuba since 1962 in honor of José Raúl Capablanca y Graupera. At the time, it was the best paid tournament in the world. Since 1974 B and C tournaments have been held.

== 1962 tournament ==
The first José Raúl Capablanca Memorial was held from 29 April to 30 May 1962 in the Habana Libre hotel in Havana, Cuba. Miguel Najdorf was first in a field of 22 players, followed by Lev Polugaevsky and Boris Spassky, Svetozar Gligorić and Vasily Smyslov, Borislav Ivkov, etc.

== 1965 tournament ==
The fourth tournament held in 1965 was marked by an unusual circumstance. U.S. Champion Bobby Fischer had been invited to play and was offered a $3000 appearance fee, but the United States Department of State would not allow him to travel to Cuba due to tensions in Cuba–United States relations. American Grandmaster Larry Evans had been permitted to play in the tournament the year before, as he was also acting as a journalist. The U.S. Department of State often allowed newsmen and journalists to travel to off-limits countries, but it would not budge on Fischer even though he had made arrangements to write about the event for the Saturday Review. Fischer instead played his games by telex from the Marshall Chess Club in New York City. Capablanca's son Dr. José Raúl Capablanca Jr relayed the moves in Havana. When Fischer's participation seemed assured, Cuban President Fidel Castro called it a "great propaganda victory for Cuba", making headlines. When Fischer heard of this, he cabled Castro threatening to withdraw unless Castro stopped making political statements about Fischer's participation. A cabled reply from Castro eased Fischer's concern and he joined the field of twenty-two players, with thirteen Grandmasters and seven International Masters. Play by teletype added to the strain of the tournament. Although the English magazine CHESS thought that this was an advantage for Fischer who became accustomed to this manner of play (each of his opponents experienced it only once), others considered it a handicap for Fischer who endured the extra labor in every game. Former World Champion Vasily Smyslov (USSR) won the tournament with 15½ points of 21. Borislav Ivkov (Yugoslavia), Efim Geller (USSR), and Fischer shared second through fourth, a half point behind. Although Fischer did not win, his performance was widely considered a success given the playing conditions and the fact that Fischer was playing his first international tournament in three years.

== Winners ==
#	Year	City	Winner
1	1962	Havana	Miguel Najdorf (Argentina)
2	1963	Havana	Viktor Korchnoi (Soviet Union)
3	1964	Havana	Vasily Smyslov (Soviet Union); Wolfgang Uhlmann (East Germany)
4	1965	Havana	Vasily Smyslov (Soviet Union)
5	1967	Havana	Bent Larsen (Denmark)
6	1968	Havana	Ratmir Kholmov (Soviet Union)
7	1969	Havana	Alexey Suetin (Soviet Union); Viktor Korchnoi (Soviet Union)
8	1971	Havana	Vlastimil Hort (Czechoslovakia)
9	1972	Cienfuegos	Anatoly Lein (Soviet Union)
10	1973	Cienfuegos	Vasily Smyslov (Soviet Union)
11	1974	Camagüey	Ulf Andersson (Sweden)
12	1975	Cienfuegos	Ulf Andersson (Sweden)
13	1976	Cienfuegos	Boris Gulko (Soviet Union)
14	1977	Cienfuegos	Oleg Romanishin (Soviet Union); Guillermo Garcia Gonzales (Cuba)
15	1979	Cienfuegos	Evgeny Sveshnikov (Soviet Union)
16	1980	Cienfuegos	Alonso Zapata (Colombia); Ľubomír Ftáčnik (Czechoslovakia)
17	1981	Cienfuegos	Vitaly Tseshkovsky (Soviet Union)
18	1983	Cienfuegos	Lev Psakhis (Soviet Union)
19	1984	Cienfuegos	Amador Rodríguez Céspedes (Cuba); Rainer Knaak (East Germany)
20	1985	Havana	Borislav Ivkov (Yugoslavia)
21	1986	Havana	Carlos Garcia Palermo (Argentina); Julio Granda Zúñiga (Peru)
22	1987	Camagüey	Carlos Garcia Palermo (Argentina); Denis Verduga (Mexico)
23	1988	Havana	Zurab Azmaiparashvili (Soviet Union)
24	1989	Holguín	Amador Rodríguez Céspedes (Cuba)
25	1990	Havana	Adelkis Remón (Cuba)
26	1991	Havana	Valeriy Neverov (Soviet Union)
27	1992	Matanzas	Henry Urday Cáceres (Peru)
28	1993	Matanzas	Mark Hebden (England)
29	1994	Matanzas	Loek van Wely (Netherlands); Tony Miles (England); Alonso Zapata (Colombia)
30	1995	Matanzas	Tony Miles (England)
31	1996	Cienfuegos	Tony Miles (England)
32	1997	Cienfuegos	Peter Leko (Hungary)
33	1998	Havana	Robert Hübner (Germany); Iván Morovic (Chile); Yaacov Zilberman (Israel)
34	1999	Havana	Tony Miles (England)
35	2000	Varadero	Alexander Volzhin (Russia)
36	2001	Havana	Francisco Vallejo Pons (Spain)
37	2002	Havana	Lázaro Bruzón (Cuba)
38	2003	Havana	Julio Granda Zúñiga (Peru)
39	2004	Havana	Leinier Domínguez (Cuba)
40	2005	Havana	Vassily Ivanchuk (Ukraine)
41	2006	Havana	Vassily Ivanchuk (Ukraine)
42	2007	Havana	Vassily Ivanchuk (Ukraine)
43	2008	Havana	Leinier Domínguez (Cuba)
44	2009	Havana	Leinier Domínguez (Cuba)
45	2010	Havana	Vassily Ivanchuk (Ukraine)
46	2011	Havana	Vassily Ivanchuk (Ukraine); Lê Quang Liêm (Vietnam)
47	2012	Havana	Vassily Ivanchuk (Ukraine)
48	2013	Havana	Zoltán Almási (Hungary)
49	2014	Havana	Wesley So (Philippines)
50	2015	Havana	Yu Yangyi (China)
51	2016	Varadero	Vassily Ivanchuk (Ukraine)
52	2017	Varadero	Krishnan Sasikiran (IND)
53	2018	Havana	Sam Shankland (USA)
54	2019	Havana	Vassily Ivanchuk (Ukraine)
55	2022	Havana	Hans Niemann (USA)
56	2023	Havana	Jonas Buhl Bjerre (Denmark)
57	2024	Havana	Ruslan Ponomariov (Ukraine)
58	2025	Havana	Jonas Buhl Bjerre (Denmark)

== 51st Capablanca Memorial (9–19 June 2016) ==
The 51st edition of the Capablanca Memorial took place in the Hotel Barceló Solymar Arenas Blancas, Varadero, Cuba, from June 9 to 19, 2016. The tournament format was a six-player ten-round double round robin. The time control was 90 minutes for 40 moves plus 30 additional minutes starting from move 41, plus a 30-second increment starting from the first move.

Cat. XVIII (2695)
	Player	Rating	1	2	3	4	5	6	Points	TPR
1	Vassily Ivanchuk (Ukraine)	2710	* *	½ ½	½ ½	1 ½	1 ½	1 1	7	2845
2	Yuriy Kryvoruchko (Ukraine)	2682	½ ½	* *	½ ½	½ 1	½ ½	½ 1	6	2772
3	Ivan Cheparinov (Bulgaria)	2687	½ ½	½ ½	* *	½ ½	½ ½	½ ½	5	2700
4	Zoltán Almási (Hungary)	2688	0 ½	½ 0	½ ½	* *	½ ½	1 1	5	2699
5	Leinier Domínguez Pérez (Cuba)	2723	0 ½	½ ½	½ ½	½ ½	* *	½ ½	4½	2657
6	Lázaro Bruzón Batista (Cuba)	2681	0 0	½ 0	½ ½	0 0	½ ½	* *	2½	2509
