= 1939 in chess =

The below is a list of events in chess in 1939.

== Chess events in brief ==
- Last (21st) edition of Howard Staunton's The Chess-Player's Handbook is published.
- 21 August-19 September 1939 - the 8th Chess Olympiad (known at the time as the Hamilton-Russell Cup) is held in Buenos Aires. Germany wins the gold medal (Erich Eliskases on first board), Poland silver (Savielly Tartakower on first board), and Estonia bronze (Paul Keres on first board).
- The 7th Women's World Championship is held in conjunction with the Olympiad. Vera Menchik-Stevenson (England) retains her title. She won, scoring 18/19, followed by Sonja Graf (16/19), Berna Carrasco (15.5/19), etc.
- Political refugees - At the conclusion of events, many participants decided to stay in Argentina or moved elsewhere in South America, rather than face an uncertain future by returning to Europe in the midst of World War II. The players affected included Miguel Najdorf, Paulino Frydman, Gideon Ståhlberg, Erich Eliskases, Paul Michel, Ludwig Engels, Albert Becker, Heinrich Reinhardt, Jiří Pelikán, Karel Skalička, Markas Luckis, Movsas Feigins, Ilmar Raud, Moshe Czerniak, Meir Rauch, Victor Winz, Aristide Gromer, Franciszek Sulik, Adolf Seitz, Chris De Ronde, Zelman Kleinstein, Sonja Graf and Paulette Schwartzmann. Most of them were Jewish and had come to Buenos Aires in August 1939 on the Belgian steamer "Piriapolis". The ship has therefore come to be regarded as the epitome of Noah's Ark for a generation of chess players. Significantly, all members of the German team also chose not to return to Nazi Germany.
- 27 December 1939 - American Chess Federation and National Chess Federation form the United States Chess Federation (USCF).

== Tournaments ==
- Hastings International Chess Congress won by László Szabó ahead of Max Euwe, 1938/39.
- Sydney (the Australian Chess Championship), won by Gary Koshnitsky, 1938/39.
- Wanganui (the New Zealand Chess Championship), won by John Dunlop, 1938/39.
- Riga (the Latvian Chess Championship), won by Vladimirs Petrovs, 1938/39.
- Warsaw won by Mieczysław Najdorf ahead of Dawid Przepiórka, 1938/39.
- Karlsruhe won by Anton Kohler, Efim Bogoljubow and Eisinger Jr, 26 December 1938 - January 1939.
- Leningrad-Moscow won by Salo Flohr ahead of Samuel Reshevsky, January 3 - February 1, 1939.
- Amsterdam (KNSB), won by Euwe, Szabó and Flohr
- Amsterdam (VARA), won by Salo Landau and Euwe.
- Baarn (I) (Quadrangular), won by Flohr.
- Baarn (II) (Quadrangular), won by Euwe.
- Beverwijk (Quadrangular), won by Nicolaas Cortlever.
- Amsterdam (the 12th Dutch Chess Championship), won by Landau.
- Birmingham won by Lodewijk Prins ahead of Paul List and H.E. Price.
- Budapest won by Zoltán von Balla and Szabó.
- Kemeri–Riga won by Flohr ahead of Gideon Ståhlberg and Szabó, March 1939.
- Warsaw won by Najdorf ahead of Paulin Frydman.
- Łódź won by Izaak Appel and Jakub Kolski, ahead of Teodor Regedziński, March 1939.
- Lvov (Championship of the City), won by Izak Schächter ahead of Henryk Friedman.
- Minsk (the Belarusian Chess Championship), won by Gavril Veresov.
- Leningrad (the Leningrad City Chess Championship), won by Georgy Lisitsin.
- Lübeck won by Alfred Brinckmann, start 2 April 1939.
- Krefeld won by Georg Kieninger and Ludwig Engels, start 6 April 1939.
- Bad Warmbrunn won by Rudolf Keller, Paul Michel and Ludwig Rellstab, start 7 April 1939.
- Aberdeen (the Scottish Chess Championship), won by Max Pavey, April 1939.
- Margate won by Paul Keres ahead of José Raúl Capablanca and Flohr, 12–21 April 1939.
- Leningrad (the 11th USSR Chess Championship), won by Mikhail Botvinnik ahead of Alexander Kotov, April 15 - May 16, 1939.
- Stuttgart (Europa-Turnier) won by Bogoljubow ahead of Kurt Richter, start 15 May 1939.
- Montreux (the Swiss Chess Championship), won by Henri Grob.
- Paris won by Nicolas Rossolimo ahead of Savielly Tartakower.
- Rome (the Italian Chess Championship), won by Mario Monticelli ahead of Vincenzo Castaldi.
- Zagreb (the Yugoslav Chess Championship), won by Milan Vidmar ahead of Vasilije Tomović.
- Prague won by Jiří Pelikán ahead of Karel Opočenský, František Schubert and Karel Skalička.
- Buenos Aires (the Argentine Chess Championship, Torneo Mayor), won by Ion Traian Iliescu followed jointly by Carlos Maderna, Luis Piazzini, and José Gerschman.
- London (Championship of the City), won by George Alan Thomas.
- London (League Congress), won by William Winter.
- Durban (the South African Chess Championship) won by Wolfgang Heidenfeld.
- Oslo (the 19th Nordic Chess Championship), won by Ståhlberg and Erik Lundin.
- Helsinki (the Finnish Chess Championship), won by Osmo Kaila.
- Copenhagen (the Danish Chess Championship, play-off), won by Holger Norman-Hansen.
- Stockholm (the Swedish Chess Championship), won by Ståhlberg ahead of Rudolf Spielmann and Nils Bergkvist.
- Gothenburg won by Flohr and Spielmann.
- Tallinn (the Estonian Chess Championship), won by Ilmar Raud.
- Jerusalem (Championship of the City), won by Moshe Czerniak, June 1939.
- Berlin (the Berlin City Chess Championship), won by Mölbitz ahead of Paul Mross, June 1939.
- Bad Elster won by Erich Eliskases followed by Josef Lokvenc, Herbert Heinicke and Michel, start 4 June 1939.
- Vienna won by Eliskases ahead of Hans Müller, start 11 June 1939.
- Bad Harzburg won by Eliskases ahead of Ståhlberg, start 25 June 1939.
- Bad Oeynhausen (the 6th German Chess Championship), won by Eliskases followed by Lokvenc, Karl Gilg, etc., start 9 July 1939.
- Ventnor City won by Milton Hanauer ahead of Fred Reinfeld, 8–16 July 1939.
- New York City (the 40th U.S. Open, American Chess Federation Championship), won by Reuben Fine followed by Reshevsky, Israel Albert Horowitz, etc., 17–29 July 1939.
- Bournemouth won by Max Euwe ahead of Ernest Klein and Flohr, August 1939.
- Rosario won by Petrovs, followed by Eliskases, Vladas Mikėnas, etc., 21–28 September 1939.
- Montevideo (Millington Drake Tournament) won by Alexander Alekhine ahead of Harry Golombek and Vera Menchik, 21–29 September 1939.
- Buenos Aires (Circulo) won by Keres and Miguel Najdorf, ahead of Ståhlberg and Czerniak, 2–19 October 1939.
- New York City (the 23rd Marshall Chess Club Championship), won by Fine followed by Hanauer, Frank James Marshall, David Polland, Herbert Seidman, Edward Lasker, etc.
- Hampstead won by Imre König and Philip Stuart Milner-Barry, December 1939.
- Dnipropetrovsk (the 11th Ukrainian Chess Championship), won by Isaac Boleslavsky, 12–31 December 1939.
- Moscow (the Moscow City Chess Championship), won by Andor Lilienthal ahead of Vasily Panov and Vasily Smyslov, 1939/40.
- Hastings International Chess Congress won by Frank Parr, 1939/40.

== Matches ==
- Erich Eliskases defeated Efim Bogoljubow (11.5 : 8.5) in Germany (various places), January 1939.
- Sonja Graf beat Fenny Heemskerk (4 : 0) in Amsterdam.
- Sonja Graf beat Catharina Roodzant (3 : 1) in Rotterdam.
- Salo Landau drew with Theo van Scheltinga (5 : 5) in Amsterdam.
- Salo Landau drew with László Szabó (5 : 5) in Amsterdam.
- Max Euwe beat Salo Landau (7.5 : 2.5) in Rotterdam, Utrecht, The Hague.
- Roberto Grau defeated Carlos Guimard (7.5 : 5.5) in La Plata, Argentina (the 17th ARG-ch).
- Octavio Trompowsky beat Walter Cruz (5.5 : 2.5) in Rio de Janeiro (BRA-ch).
- Paul Keres won against Max Euwe (7.5 : 6.5) in The Netherlands (various places) in 1939/40.

== Team matches ==
- 15–16 April, Karlsbad (Karlovy Vary), Protectorate of Bohemia and Moravia: Germany vs. Hungary 26½-13½ (13½-6½, 13-7)

(Eliskases 1½ Barcza; Bogoljubow 11 E.Steiner; Kieninger ½½ Rethy; Gilg ½1 Vajda; P.Michel 1½ Szily; Rellstab 1½ Tipary; Richter 11 Füster; Heinicke 1½ Törok; Kohler ½½ Balla; A.Becker ½1 Negyessi; Zollner 00 Balogh; L.Schmitt ½1 Sarközy; Lokvenc 1½ St. Gecsei; Schlage ½0 Sebestyen; Blümich ½½ Bakonyi; Hahn 1½ Sooky; R.Keller ½½ Laszlo; Krassnig ½1 Szentkiralyi-Toth; Platt ½1 Vargha; H.Keller ½1 Rög)

- 28–29 May, The Hague: Netherlands vs. England 10-10 (4½-5½, 5½-4½)

(Euwe 0½ Alexander; Landau 10 Thomas; Van den Bosch 1½ Milner-Barry; Cortlever 00 Broadbent; Van Scheltinga ½½ Golombek; G.S.Fontein 0½ Winter; De Groot ½1 E.G.Sergeant; Muhring 11 B.H.Wood; Mulder 0½ Parr; J.H.C.Fontein ½1 Lenton)

== Births ==
- 7 January – Ivan Radulov in Burgas, Hungarian GM
- 29 January – Hans-Joachim Hecht in Luckenwalde, German GM, two-time German Champion
- 29 January – Li Shongjian, Chinese chess player
- 1 March – Leroy Dubeck in Orange, New Jersey, President of the United States Chess Federation (1969–1972)
- 14 March – Stewart Reuben, British chess player, organiser, and arbiter
- 1 June – Yaacov Bernstein, Israeli chess player
- 27 August – Tüdeviin Üitümen, Mongolian IM
- 15 November – Charles Kalme in Riga, American IM

== Deaths ==
- 1939 - Katarina Beskow-Froeken died in Sweden. Women's World Sub-Champion in 1927.
- 1939 - Iosif Januschpolski (Yanushpolsky) died.
- 2 February 1939 - Bernhard Gregory died in Berlin, Germany.
- 8 February 1939 - Salomon Langleben died in Warsaw, Poland.
- 11 February 1939 - Jan Kvíčala died in Czecho-Slovakia.
- 28 May 1939 - Hans Fahrni died in Ostermundingen, Switzerland. 1st to play 100 simultaneously, 1911.
- 7 August 1939 - Paul Krüger died in Germany.
- August 1939 - Alexei Alekhine killed by NKVD in the Soviet Union.
- September 1939 - Jan Kleczyński, Jr. died of a heart attack during a bombing of Warsaw (World War II).
- September 1939 - Karol Piltz died during the siege of Warsaw.
- after 17 September 1939 - Kalikst Morawski died during the Soviet occupation of Lvov.
- 26 September 1939 - Ottó Bláthy died in Budapest. Created longest problem, 290 moves.
- 4 October 1939 - Ludvig Collijn died in Stockholm. President of the Swedish Chess Association from 1917 to 1939.
