= Victor Winz =

Viktor (Víctor) Winz (Hebrew: ויקטור ווינץ; 31 August 1906 – date of death unknown) was a Palestine/Israeli–Argentine chess master.

Born in Germany, he began his chess career in Berlin. He emigrated to Mandatory Palestine in the early 1930s.

Winz played for the Palestine team in two Chess Olympiads; at fourth board (+2 -9 =2) in the 6th Olympiad at Warsaw 1935, and at third board (+4 -6 =5) in the 8th Olympiad at Buenos Aires 1939.

In September 1939, when World War II broke out, Winz, along with many other participants of the 8th Chess Olympiad, decided to stay permanently in Argentina.

In 1941, he took 7th in Buenos Aires (Miguel Najdorf won, followed by Moshe Czerniak, Hermann Pilnik, Paul Michel, etc.). In 1941, he took 17th in Mar del Plata (Gideon Ståhlberg won, followed by Najdorf, Erich Eliskases, Ludwig Engels, Paulino Frydman, Czerniak, Movsas Feigins, Carlos Guimard, etc.).

His last recorded tournament was the 1957 Berlin championship, where he finished 7= behind Rudolf Teschner.
