= Mar del Plata 1941 chess tournament =

The fourth Mar del Plata chess tournament was held in the city of Mar del Plata, Argentina, in March 1941. The first three Mar del Plata international tournaments (1928, 1934, 1936) were regarded as the third, fourth, and sixth South American Chess Championship (Torneo Sudamericano), respectively. The first Torneio Sulamericano took place in Montevideo (Carrasco), Uruguay, in 1921/22.

After the 8th Chess Olympiad at Buenos Aires 1939, many participants had decided to stay in Argentina due to outbreak of World War II. The 1941 Mar del Plata tournament therefore included eleven refugees from Europe and two players affected by issues arising out of the British Mandate of Palestine.

The results and standings:

Mar del Plata 1941
#	Player	Native Country	Chosen Country	1	2	3	4	5	6	7	8	9	10	11	12	13	14	15	16	17	18	Total	Berger
1	Gideon Ståhlberg	Sweden	Sweden	x	½	½	½	½	½	1	1	1	1	½	½	1	1	½	1	1	1	13	
2	Miguel Najdorf	Poland	Argentina	½	x	½	1	1	1	1	½	1	½	½	½	1	1	0	1	½	1	12½	
3	Erich Eliskases	Austria	Argentina	½	½	x	½	½	1	½	1	½	½	½	1	½	½	1	½	1	1	11½	
4	Ludwig Engels	Germany	Brazil	½	0	½	x	½	½	1	1	1	0	½	1	1	1	1	½	0	1	11	87.75
5	Paulino Frydman	Poland	Argentina	½	0	½	½	x	0	½	½	½	½	1	1	½	1	1	1	1	1	11	80.50
6	Moshe Czerniak	Poland/Palestine	Israel	½	0	0	½	1	x	½	1	0	½	1	½	1	0	0	1	1	1	9½	73.25
7	Movsas Feigins	Latvia	Argentina	0	0	½	0	½	½	x	0	1	½	1	1	1	1	1	½	0	1	9½	70.25
8	Carlos Guimard	Argentina	Argentina	0	½	0	0	½	0	1	x	1	1	1	½	½	½	0	1	1	1	9½	69.75
9	Julio Bolbochán	Argentina	Argentina	0	0	½	0	½	1	0	0	x	1	½	1	½	½	1	½	1	1	9	
10	Paul Michel	Germany	Argentina	0	½	½	1	½	½	½	0	0	x	½	0	½	½	½	½	1	1	8	61.75
11	Franciszek Sulik	Poland	Australia	½	½	½	½	0	0	0	0	½	½	x	1	1	½	0	½	1	1	8	61.00
12	Juan Vinuesa	Argentina	Argentina	½	½	0	0	0	½	0	½	0	1	0	x	½	1	1	1	1	½	8	57.75
13	Jacobo Bolbochán	Argentina	Argentina	0	0	½	0	½	0	0	½	½	½	0	½	x	½	1	1	1	1	7½	
14	Ilmar Raud	Estonia	Argentina	0	0	½	0	0	1	0	½	½	½	½	0	½	x	1	½	½	½	6½	
15	Juan Traian Iliesco	Romania	Argentina	½	1	0	0	0	1	0	1	0	½	1	0	0	0	x	½	0	½	6	
16	Markas Luckis	Lithuania	Argentina	0	0	½	½	0	0	½	0	½	½	½	0	0	½	½	x	1	½	5½	
17	Victor Winz	Germany/Palestine	Argentina	0	½	0	1	0	0	1	0	0	0	0	0	0	½	1	0	x	½	4½	
18	Sonja Graf	Germany	United States	0	0	0	0	0	0	0	0	0	0	0	½	0	½	½	½	½	x	2½	
