= Dulanto =

Dulanto is a Spanish surname. Notable people with the surname include:

- Alberto Ismodes Dulanto (1910–unknown), Peruvian chess master
- Alfonso Dulanto (born 1969), Peruvian professional footballer
- Alfonso Dulanto Rencoret (1943–2025), Chilean politician
- Gustavo Dulanto (born 1995), Peruvian professional footballer
- Héctor Chumpitaz Dulanto (born 1967), Peruvian footballer and manager
- Laura Esther Rodriguez Dulanto (1872–1919), first female physician in Peru
- Manuel Cipriano Dulanto (1801–1867), Peruvian military man
- Santiago María Ramírez Ruíz de Dulanto (1891–1967), Dominican priest and professor
