= José María Cristiá =

Argentine chess player

José María Cristiá (October 6, 1907 in Barcelona – March 8, 1984 in Rosario) was an Argentine chess player, lawyer, champion of Rosario in 1928 and 1940.

He was seventh in the Argentine Torneo Mayor of 1931, and fifth in Buenos Aires 1931 (2nd, Tartakower).

He was antepenultimate in Buenos Aires 1935.

He was penultimate in Rosario 1939 (1st, Petrov; 2nd, Eliskases; 3rd, Mikėnas).

He won "La Regence" tournament in Buenos Aires 1944 (2nd, Michel; 3rd, Becker).

He was fourth in Viña del Mar 1945 (1st, Guimard; 2nd, Najdorf), his last tournament.

Cristiá built one of the largest chess libraries in the world.
