= Chris de Ronde =

Dutch-Argentine chess player

Chris (Christiaan) Frans de Ronde (April 9, 1913 in Schiedam – 1996 in Buenos Aires) was a Dutch–Argentinian chess master.

He was champion of Rotterdam in 1937 and 1939. He had studied mathematics in Leiden and Paris.

De Ronde played for the Netherlands in the 8th Chess Olympiad at Buenos Aires 1939, scoring 8½ in his 14 games. After the tournament, during which World War II broke out in Europe (September 1939), De Ronde, along with many other participants of the Olympiad (Miguel Najdorf, Gideon Ståhlberg, et al.) decided to stay permanently in Argentina.

He played in Buenos Aires in 1940, and tied for 12-13th at Buenos Aires (Circulo) 1945 (Miguel Najdorf won).

== 1939 Chess Olympiad and stay in Buenos Aires ==
In 1939 de Ronde qualified for the Dutch Candidates Tournament, finishing with 3½/9 (shared 7th–8th; Salo Landau won). As several leading Dutch players declined to travel to Argentina, he was selected at short notice for the national team at the 8th Chess Olympiad in Buenos Aires.

At the Olympiad, played in the same venue as Alexander Alekhine, José Raúl Capablanca, Paul Keres and Savielly Tartakower, de Ronde scored 8½ points from 14 games, the second-best Dutch result, as the Netherlands finished eighth among 27 teams.

During the tournament World War II broke out in Europe. De Ronde chose to remain in Buenos Aires, as did several other masters including Erich Eliskases, Gideon Ståhlberg, Miguel Najdorf and Moshe Czerniak. According to later journalistic accounts, he had held left-wing political convictions in the Netherlands of the 1930s and was opposed to the coming war; the Olympiad invitation provided an opportunity to leave Europe permanently.

Summoned to report for military service by the Dutch authorities upon the outbreak of the war, De Ronde refused to return to Europe due to his anti-war convictions, becoming a deserter. In the early post-war years, he frequented the Confitería Rex on Avenida Corrientes, a key gathering place for European chess émigrés and local intellectuals such as Witold Gombrowicz.

Databases record at least one game played in Buenos Aires in 1940 and participation in a strong Buenos Aires tournament in 1945 featuring Ståhlberg, Czerniak and Najdorf, where de Ronde scored 1/12. After that event he disappeared from international chess records.

== De Ronde–Kamstra (Dutch Championship 1938) ==
For decades Dutch chess literature circulated an anonymous “immortal game” known only as De Ronde–NN, consisting of a spectacular sacrificial sequence. In 1999 Tim Krabbé established that the full game was De Ronde–Kamstra, played in the preliminaries of the Dutch Championship in 1938.

The complete score is:

De Ronde – Kamstra, Dutch Championship (Preliminaries), 1938 1. c4 Nf6 2. Nc3 g6 3. e4 d6 4. d4 Bg7 5. f3 Nbd7 6. Be3 e5 7. d5 a5 8. Qd2 b6 9. g4 Nc5 10. Nge2 h5 11. g5 Nfd7 12. Qc2 Nb8 13. O-O-O Nba6 14. a3 Bd7 15. Kb1 O-O 16. Nc1 Qe7 17. Be2 Rfe8 18. Rdg1 Qd8 19. h3 Qc8 20. Bf1 Re7 21. Rh2 Qb7 22. Bd3 Nxd3 23. Nxd3 Nc5 24. a4 Qc8 25. Nf2 Na6 26. Qd1 Nb4 27. Nb5 Qb7 28. Bd2 Na6 29. Qe1 Nc5 30. Be3 Nxa4 31. Ng4 hxg4 32. hxg4 Ree8 33. Qh4 Kf8 34. Qh7 Nc5 35. Nd4 exd4 36. Qxg7+ Kxg7 37. Bxd4+ Re5 38. f4 Nxe4 39. fxe5 Nxg5 40. e6+ f6 41. Rf1 Rf8 42. exd7 Qb8 43. Rxf6 Rxf6 44. Rf2 Ne4 45. Rxf6 Qd8 46. g5 Nxg5 47. Rxd6+ Kf8 48. Bf6 cxd6 49. Bxd8 Nf7 50. Bf6 1–0.

Krabbé noted that while the first 30 moves were strategically conventional, the final sacrificial sequence secured the game’s place in Dutch chess folklore.

== Life in Argentina ==
Contemporary accounts describe de Ronde as a reserved, meticulous man who spoke grammatically precise Spanish with a noticeable foreign accent and avoided social prominence. In Buenos Aires he supported himself largely by giving private lessons, including English and mathematics.

He resided for decades in the San Telmo neighborhood alongside his partner, Haydee, and their son, Christián (born c. 1976). An austere intellectual, his extensive personal library was largely devoted to philosophy, particularly works by Friedrich Nietzsche, while he reportedly refused to read authors he considered politically "reactionary," including Jorge Luis Borges.

Accounts portray him as politically disillusioned both with European fascism and later Argentine politics. He never returned to the Netherlands and reportedly ceased following competitive chess decades before his death.

== Final years and death ==
De Ronde died at home in Buenos Aires in 1996. Reports describe chronic respiratory problems in his final years and a long history of heavy smoking. Refusing prolonged hospitalization during his final illness, he spent his last days at home surrounded by classical music and reading foreign press publications such as La Nación, the Argentinisches Tageblatt, and The Buenos Aires Herald.

== Cultural and literary reception ==
De Ronde’s life in Argentina and his decision not to return to Europe after 1939 have been revisited in Argentine cultural journalism, which portrays him as a marginal yet intellectually committed figure who gradually slipped into anonymity while surviving through private teaching.

In 2019 Argentine author Gustavo Bernstein published De Ronde. Retrato de un apátrida (Ítaca Ediciones, Buenos Aires, ISBN 978-987-45493-8-9), a documentary-literary reconstruction of de Ronde’s life that combines archival material, narrative reconstruction and political context.

Reviews note that the work is structured in 64 chapters and incorporates chronicle, interview fragments and historical commentary to situate de Ronde’s trajectory within broader twentieth-century Argentine political history, including Peronism and the military dictatorship, as well as themes of exile and ideological conflict.
