= Jiří Pelikán (chess player) =

Czech–Argentine chess player (1906–1984)

Jiří (Jorge) Pelikán (Častolovice, 23 April 1906 – Chacabuco, July 1984) was a Czech-Argentine chess master.

In 1935, Jiří Pelikán tied for 2nd-4th in Luhačovice (Karel Opočenský won) then won in Prague (12th Kautsky memorial). In 1936, he tied for 7-8th in Poděbrady (Salo Flohr won). In 1936, he tied for 6-7th in Novi Sad (Vasja Pirc won). In 1936, he won in Prague (13th Kautsky memorial). In 1937, he took 5th in Bad Elster (Ludwig Rellstab and Efim Bogoljubow won). In 1937, he took 8th in Prague as Paul Keres won.

He played for Czechoslovakia (known as the Protectorate of Bohemia & Moravia in 1939) in three Chess Olympiads:

- In 1935, first reserve board at the 6th Olympiad in Warsaw (+7 –1 =7);
- In 1937, fourth board at the 7th Olympiad in Stockholm (+3 –4 =3);
- In 1939, third board at the 8th Olympiad in Buenos Aires (+8 –2 =5).

He won the individual silver medal at Warsaw 1935 for his 70% score.

Following the outbreak of World War II, Pelikán, along with many other participants of the 8th Olympiad (Miguel Najdorf, Erich Eliskases et al.) decided to stay permanently in Argentina.

In 1942, Pelikán tied for 6-7th in Mar del Plata (Miguel Najdorf won). In 1943, he tied for 3rd-6th in Mar del Plata (Gideon Ståhlberg won). In 1944, he tied for 7-8th in Mar del Plata (Hermann Pilnik and Najdorf won). In 1945/46, he took 4th, behind René Letelier, Carlos Skalicka, and Movsas Feigins, in Buenos Aires (Círculo La Régence).

In 1955, he tied for 8-9th in Buenos Aires (ARG-ch; Najdorf won). In 1956, he took 9th in Mar del Plata (ARG-ch; Raúl Sanguineti won). In 1956, he won, ahead of Behrensen, in Buenos Aires (Alekhine memorial). In 1957, he tied for 3rd-4th in Buenos Aires (ARG-ch; Sanguineti won). In 1957, he took 3rd in San Nicolás (Eliskases won). In 1958, he took 3rd in Buenos Aires (Sanguineti won). In 1958, he took 3rd in Buenos Aires (Alfredo Espósito won). In 1960, he took 3rd in Buenos Aires (ARG-ch; Najdorf won). In 1961, he tied for 10-11th in Mar del Plata (Najdorf won).

In 1965, Pelikán won in Chacabuco. In 1965, he tied for 4-5th in Buenos Aires (ARG-ch; Sanguineti won). In 1966, he took 2nd in Buenos Aires (ARG-ch; Miguel Quinteros won). In 1966, he tied for 11-13th in Rio Hondo (6th South-American zonal). The event was won by Henrique Mecking, Julio Bolbochán, Oscar Panno and Alberto Foguelman. In 1967, he tied for 9-10th in Mar del Plata (ARG-ch; Najdorf won). In 1968, he took 2nd, behind Najdorf, in Mar del Plata (ARG-ch, sf). In 1968, he tied for 8-9th in Buenos Aires (Sanguineti won). In 1970, he tied for 1st-2nd with Héctor Rossetto in Miramar. In 1972, he won in Buenos Aires (ARG-ch, prefinal). In 1972, he tied for 10-11th in Buenos Aires (ARG-ch; Rossetto won).

In 1957 he was the first Argentine Correspondence Chess champion.

The Lasker–Pelikan Variation of the Sicilian Defence (ECO code B33) is named after him and German Grandmaster Emanuel Lasker.

He was awarded the International Master (IM) title in 1965.
