= Paul Michel (chess player) =

German-Argentine chess player (1905–1977)

Pablo Michel
Personal information
- Born: Paul Michel; 27 December 1905 Alzenau, German Empire
- Died: 14 September 1977 (aged 71) La Plata, Argentina

Chess career
- Country: Germany (before 1940); Argentina (after 1940)

Paul "Pablo" Michel (Alzenau, 27 December 1905 – La Plata, 14 September 1977) was a German–Argentine chess master.

== Biography ==
In June 1935, Michel tied for 3rd-4th in Saarbrücken (Koch won). In July 1935, he tied for 2nd-4th in Aachen (3rd German Championship). The event was won by Kurt Richter. In September 1935, he took 9th in Bad Saarow (Efim Bogoljubow won). In June 1936, he tied for 5th-6th in Swinemünde (Erich Eliskases won). In August 1936, he played for Germany at second reserve board (+8 –1 =3) in 3rd unofficial Chess Olympiad in Munich. He won team bronze medal and individual silver medal.

In October 1936, he tied for 3rd-5th in Vienna (19th Trebitsch). The event was won by Henryk Friedman. In June 1937, he took 3rd, after Bogoljubow and Ludwig Rellstab, in Bad Elster. In June–July 1937, he tied for 4-6th in Bad Saarow (Richter and Kuppe won). In July–August 1937, he took 4th in Bad Oeynhausen (4th GER-ch). The event was won by Georg Kieninger. In March 1938, he took 3rd in Berlin (Albert Becker and Rellstab won). In May–June 1938, he took 8th in Bad Elster (Bogoljubow won). In July–August 1938, he tied for 2nd-3rd with Kieninger, behind Eliskases, in Bad Oeynhausen (5th GER-ch). In June 1939, he tied for 2nd-4th in Bad Elster (Eliskases won). In July 1939, he took 14th in Bad Oeynhausen (6th GER-ch). The event was won by Eliskases.

In August–September 1939, he was a member of the German team at the 8th Chess Olympiad in Buenos Aires. He played at second board (+3 –0 =11), and won team gold medal. When World War II was broke out, Michel along with all German players (Eliskases, Engels, Becker, Reinhardt) and many other participants of the Olympiad decided to stay permanently in Argentina.

In 1941, he took 4th, after Gideon Ståhlberg, Miguel Najdorf and Paulino Frydman, in Buenos Aires (Bodas de Plata), took 4th, behind Najdorf, Moshe Czerniak and Hermann Pilnik, in Buenos Aires, and tied for 10-12th in the Mar del Plata 1941 chess tournament (Ståhlberg won). In 1942, he took 5th in Mar del Plata (Najdorf won). In 1943, he took 3rd in Mar del Plata (Najdorf won). In 1944, he tied for 1st-2nd with José María Cristiá in Buenos Aires (La Regence). In 1944, he tied for 3rd-4th, behind Pilnik and Najdorf, in Mar del Plata. In 1945, he took 4th in Buenos Aires (Círculo de Ajedrez; Najdorf won). In 1945, he took 4th in Mar del Plata (Najdorf won).

After the war, Pablo Michel played in Argentina and occasionally in the early 1950s in Austria. In 1946, he took 3rd, behind Najdorf and Ståhlberg, in Mar del Plata. In 1947, he tied for 12-13th in Mar del Plata (Najdorf won). In 1948, he tied for 10-12th in Mar del Plata (Eliskases won). In 1948, he finished 3rd-4th with Albéric O'Kelly de Galway, after Najdorf and Ståhlberg, in Buenos Aires (La Plata). In 1949, he won, ahead of Moshe Czerniak and Arturo Pomar, in Rosario. In 1949, he tied for 6-9th in Mar del Plata (Héctor Rossetto won). In 1950, he tied for 9-11th in Mar del Plata (Svetozar Gligorić won). In December 1950, he tied for 3rd-4th in Vienna (Enrico Paoli won). In July 1951, he tied for 5-7th in Vienna (4th Schlechter Memorial). The event was won by Czerniak. In 1952, he took 5th in Mar del Plata (Julio Bolbochán and Rossetto won).

He was awarded the International Master (IM) title in 1956.

== Notable chess games ==
- Paul Michel vs Albert Becker, Bad Oeynhausen 1938, 5th GER-ch, Sicilian Defense, B40, 1-0
- Erik Lundin vs Paul Michel, Buenos Aires 1939, 8th Olympiad, Four Knights Game, Spanish, Rubinstein Variation, C48, 0-1
- Pablo Michel vs Juan Traian Iliesco, Mar del Plata 1943, Sicilian Defense, B50, 1-0
- Pablo Michel vs Miguel Najdorf, Mar del Plata 1944, Sicilian Defense, Scheveningen, Classical Variation, 1-0
- Chris de Ronde vs Pablo Michel, Buenos Aires 1945, Tarrasch Defense, Symmetrical Variation, D32, 0-1
- Paul Michel vs Hans Müller, Vienna 1950, Sicilian, O’Kelly Variation, B28, 1-0
