= Kleinstein =

Kleinstein is a surname. Notable people with the surname include:

- Jared Kleinstein, (born 1987), originator of the term tebowing
- Rami Kleinstein (born 1962), Israeli singer and composer
- Zelman Kleinstein (1910–after 1939), Palestine/Israeli chess master
