= Holowach =

Holowach is an East Slavic surname. Notable people with the surname include:

- Ambrose Holowach (1914–1993), Canadian businessman, soldier, and politician
- Walter Holowach (1909–2008), Canadian chess master and musician
