= Ludwig Engels =

German-Brazilian chess player (1905–1967)

Personal information
- Born: 11 December 1905 Düsseldorf, German Empire
- Died: 10 January 1967 (aged 61) São Paulo, Brazil

Chess career
- Country: Brazil (after 1940); Germany (before 1940)

Ludwig Engels (11 December 1905, Düsseldorf – 10 January 1967, São Paulo) was a German–Brazilian chess master.

== Biography ==
In 1928, Engels tied for 1st-2nd with van Nüss in Düsseldorf. In 1929, he took 4th in Cologne. In 1929, he won in Duisburg. In 1929, he tied for 1st-3rd in Duisburg. In 1930, he tied for 1st-2nd with Weissgerber in Frankfurt. In 1930, Engels lost a match to Ludwig Roedl (+2 –5 =1) in Nürnberg. In 1931, he tied for 11-12th in Swinemünde (27th DSB Kongress).

In June 1933, he tied for 1st-2nd with Koch in Swinemünde. In June 1933, tied for 8th-9th in Bad Aachen (Efim Bogoljubow won). In 1934, he tied for 1st-2nd with Boeck in Bad Salzuflen Ostern. In May–June 1934, he tied for 12th-14th in Bad Aachen (2nd GER-ch). The event was won by Carl Carls. In April 1935, he tied for 1st-2nd with Ludwig Rellstab in Cologne. In August 1935, he tied for 2nd-3rd in Bad Nauheim (Efim Bogoljubow won). In June 1936, he took 2nd after Alexander Alekhine in Dresden.

In August 1936, he played for Germany at third board (+9 –5 =3) in the unofficial Olympiad in Munich. He won team bronze medal there. In November 1936, he won in Barmen. In July 1937, he took 2nd, behind Herrmann, in Bochum. In July–August 1937, he tied for 9th-10th in Bad Oeynhausen (4th GER-ch). The event was won by Georg Kieninger. In October 1937, he tied for 2nd-4th, after Reinhardt, in Magdeburg. In 1937, he tied for 4th-6th in Bad Saarow (Kurt Richter and Kuppe won). In May 1938, he won in Barmen. In May–June 1938, he tied for 2nd-3rd, behind Bogoljubow, in Bad Elster. In June 1938, he lost a match to Kieninger (5 : 7). In July–August 1938, he took 4th in Bad Oeynhausen (5th GER-ch). The event was won by Erich Eliskases. In September 1938, he took 3rd, behind Eliskases and Kieninger, in Krefeld. In 1938/39, he took 6th in Karlsruhe (Anton Kohler and Bogoljubow won). In April 1939, he tied for 1st-2nd with Kieninger in Krefeld. In May 1939, he tied for 3rd-6th in Stuttgart (Europa Turnier; Bogoljubow won). In June 1939, he took 4th in Vienna (Eliskases won). In July 1939, he tied for 6th-9th in Bad Oeynhausen (5th GER-ch; Eliskases won).

In August–September 1939, Engels played for Germany in the 8th Chess Olympiad in Buenos Aires. He won two gold medals, both team and individual (at third board: +12 –0 =4). When World War II broke out, Engels along with all other members of the German team (Eliskases, Michel, Becker, Reinhardt) and many other participants of that Olympiad (Ståhlberg, Najdorf, Frydman, Czerniak, Winz, Rauch, Kleinstein, Raud, Feigins, Luckis, Pelikan, Skalička, Sulik, Gromer, Seitz, de Ronde, Sonja Graf, Paulette Schwartzmann, etc.) decided to stay permanently in Argentina. He tied for 4th-5th in the Mar del Plata 1941 chess tournament (Gideon Ståhlberg won). In 1941, he tied for 3rd-4th with Héctor Rossetto, after Eliskases and Marcos Luckis in Montevideo. In July 1941, he tied for 3rd-4th in Águas de São Pedro (Eliskases and Guimard won).

After the war, Engels lived in São Paulo, Brazil. In 1947, he took 3rd, behind Eliskases and Miguel Najdorf, in São Paulo. In July 1947, he took 2nd, after Eliskases, in Recife. In May 1948, he tied for 4th-5th in Porto Alegre (Eliskases and Rossetto won). In June 1948, he took 4th in São Paulo (Albéric O'Kelly de Galway won). He then confined most of his chess activity to coaching and training at the São Paulo Chess Club (Clube de Xadrez São Paulo).

In April 1952, he took 6th in Rio de Janeiro (Rossetto won). In April–May 1953, he took 3rd in Rio de Janeiro (Svetozar Gligorić won). In August 1957, he tied for 5th-6th in Rio de Janeiro (zt). The event was won by Oscar Panno. In September 1957, he tied for 6th-7th in São Paulo (Raúl Sanguineti won). In November–December 1960, he tied for 6th-8th in São Paulo (zt). The event was won by Julio Bolbochán. In October 1963, he tied for 3rd-4th in São Paulo (CXSP; Samuel Schweber won). In January 1966, he took 8th in São Paulo (CXSP). The event was won by Henrique Mecking.
