= Kiril Hristov (writer) =

Bulgarian poet

Кирил Генчев Христов Kiril Genchev Hristov
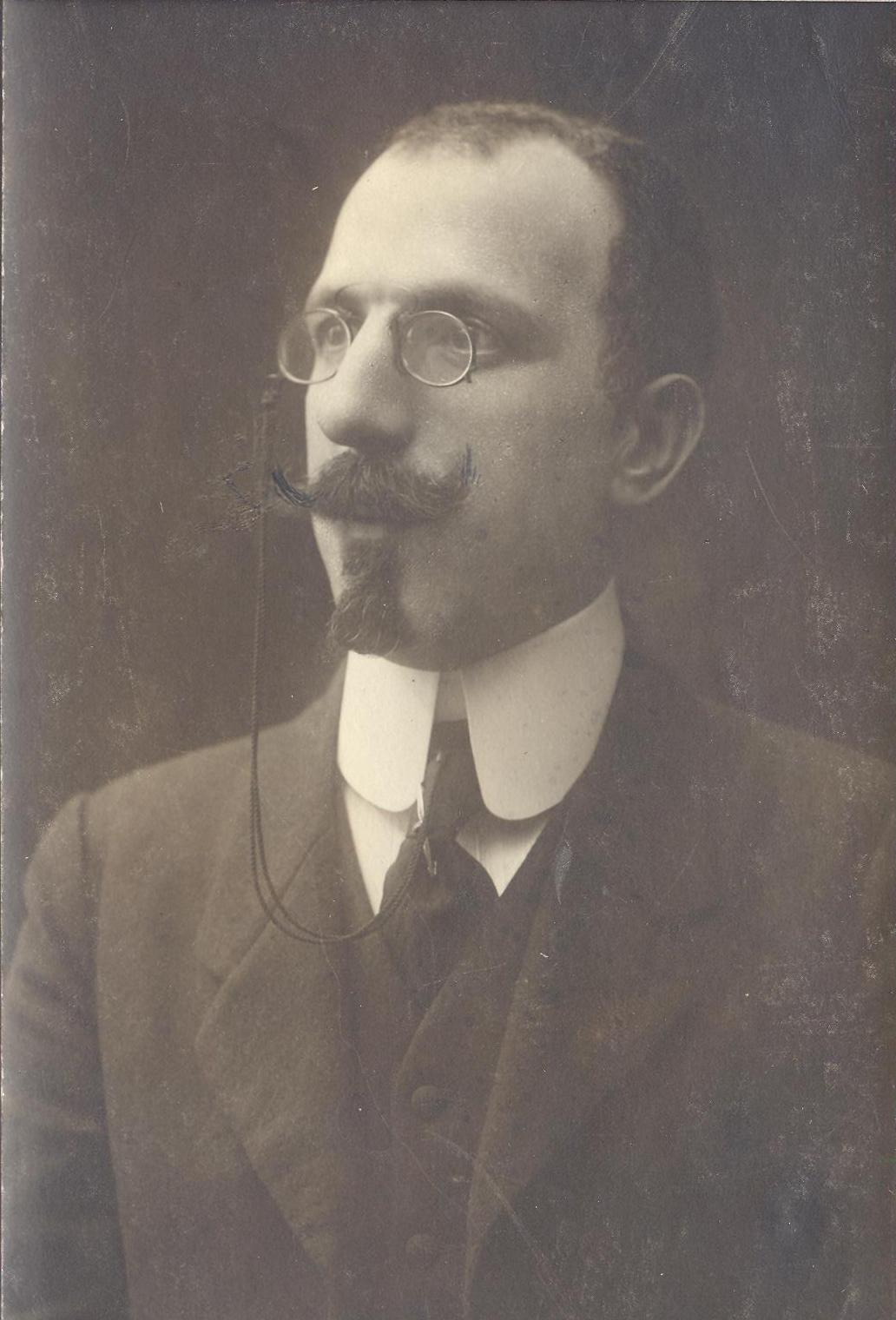
- Born: 29 June 1875; Stara Zagora, Ottoman Empire
- Died: 7 November 1944 (aged 69); Sofia, Bulgaria
- Occupations: Writer, playwright, poet, translator.
- Writing career
- Period: 1894–1944
- Notable awards: Order of Civil Merit (Bulgaria)

Kiril Genchev Hristov (29 June 1875 – 7 November 1944) was a Bulgarian poet, fiction writer, playwright and translator.

== Biography ==
Kiril Genchev Hristov was born on 29 June 1875 in Stara Zagora. He studied in his hometown, in Samokov, Tarnovo and Sofia. He was orphaned as a young boy, his two uncles, officer Georgi Abadjiev and lawyer Stefan Kirov, a law professor at Sofia State University, helped raise him. In 1895 he was sent on a scholarship from the Ministry of War to the Imperial and Royal Naval Academy, where he became acquainted with the works of classical and modern Italian poets, such as Dante Alighieri, Giacomo Leopardi, Josue Carducci, Lorenzo Stequetti and Gabriele D'Annunzio. After a one-year stay he returned to Bulgaria. From 1897 to 1898 he lived in Naples and Leipzig. He became a lecturer in Bulgarian language and literature at the University of Prague. He taught in Shumen in 1900, and in 1901 he moved to Sofia and was seconded to the library of the Higher School (today's Sofia University). Together with Anton Strashimirov he edited the magazine "Our Life". In 1904 he defended Stoyan Mihajlovski, who was given a suspended sentence for a series of articles against Bulgaria's King, Ferdinand I.

During the Balkan Wars and the First World War, he was a military correspondent and contributor to the Military News newspaper.

A wonderful and figurative lyricist, the poet had a complicated relationship with many other Bulgarian writers, such as Alexander Balabanov, Elin Pelin, Dora Gabe, Anton Strashimirov, Dr. Krastev, K. Velichkov, Alexander Kiprov and PP Slaveykov among many others. Even as a very young poet Kiril Hristov had extremely high self-confidence. At the age of 30, he demanded a personal writer's pension from the National Assembly, citing the Norwegian Parliament, which had given a national pension to 31-year-old.

In 1921, Professor Mikhail Arnaudov made an unsuccessful attempt to induct Kiril Hristov as a full member of the Academy of Sciences. In 1922 he left Bulgaria and settled in Leipzig as the head of the seminar on Bulgarian language and literature. On 16 May 1923, the State Gazette published a decree by which the government of Stamboliyski granted lifelong national pensions of BGN 2,000 per month to Stoyan Mihajlovski, Elin Pelin, Anton Strashimirov, Tsanko Bakalov and Kiril Hristov. After the coup of 9 June, the decree (albeit with a royal signature) was forgotten and unfulfilled.

In 1930 in Prague Kiril Hristov organized free courses in Bulgarian language and literature at the University of Prague. He returned to Bulgaria in 1938. On 27 June 1943, his election as an academician failed. During his lifetime he managed to arrange an Anthology, with which he thought would preserve his legacy in Bulgarian literature. He died on 7 November 1944, from lung cancer.

What he created during his time in Germany and Czechoslovakia is still unknown. Kiril Hristov is one of the most censored writers in Bulgarian publications. What is perceived as scandalous and impossible for the works of Vazov, Yavorov, Velichkov, Petko Todorov and Pencho Slaveykov, is the norm with Kiril Hristov. For this reason, there is no complete edition of his works.

His personal archive is kept in fund No. 131K in the Central State Archive. It consists of 1512 archival units from the period of 1885 to 1954.

== Literary activity ==
=== First printed works ===
He started writing in 1894, his first work was published in the magazine "Delo" No.9 1895. Later he became associated with Dr. Krastev and PP Slaveykov, which helped him grow as an artist. He started collaborating with many literary periodicals. In 1896 his first collection of poems "Songs and Sighs" was published, which was a resounding success, and further established him as a writer.

=== Literary translations ===
He began his career in literature with translations by Nadson and Pleshcheev. He joined the ranks of other notable translators, such as Edmond Rostan, M. Yu. Lermontov, AS Pushkin, A. Negri, L. Castellano and J. Vrahlitsky, among others.

=== Lyrics and fame ===
In 1897 Hristov accompanied Pencho Slaveykov in Leipzig, the same year his second collection of poems "Trembling" was published. His third collection of poems, "Eternal Shadows", was published shortly after. In 1901 the fourth collection of his poetry, "At the Crossroads" was published. The resounding success of his two lyrical books won him the patronage of Ivan Vazov and Professor Ivan Shishmanov, the Minister of Public Education at the time. With their patronage he was appointed as a librarian, first at the University of Sofia and later at the National Library in Sofia. In 1903 the collection of poems "Selected Works" was published, with a foreword by Ivan Vazov, who proclaimed Hristov "The most talented young poet". At that time Hristov was already a popular author, and was considered one of the builders of modern Bulgarian literature, with him being recognised as a classic of literary criticism. He is seen as the first great poet after Vazov. His poem "Women and wine!" (1897) is still one of the most popular and recited works of Bulgarian literature.

=== Literary influences and career in Bulgaria ===
In 1906 he went to Germany, where he came under the influence of German modernism. The following year, during the university crisis caused by a student obstruction against Prince Ferdinand, he was appointed associate professor of Bulgarian and Italian literature at Sofia University. He was sent on a specialization in Paris, but after the return of the old professors to the university he was forced to take the place of a junior high school teacher. During these years "Samodivska Kitka" was published, it was a collection of lyrical excerpts written in the spirit of the folk song. Also published were the cycle "Leonardo da Vinci", the poetry collections "Hymns of the Dawn" and "Sunflowers".

His most intense creative period was from 1912 to 1918, with the publication of the poetry collections "To Constantinople", "On the knife", "Victory Songs"; the dramas "Boyan the Magician", "Rachenitsa", "Ohrid Girl"; the collection of military stories "Fire Road" and the collection of articles "Stormy Years". Due to raised patriotism, Hristov, who signed some of his works as Kiril Tatarobulgarski, was accused of chauvinism and gained many enemies.

Between 1919 and 1921 the volume "Stories", the first Bulgarian erotic novel "Dark Dawns" and the dramatic poems collection "Feast in Flames" were all published.

=== Life outside Bulgaria ===
After a quarrel with Professor Alexander Balabanov he was removed from an old epigrams of Hristov's "Against the Macedonians", Hristov was forced to emigrate because of this. In 1923 he settled in Leipzig, later in Jena. In 1929 he settled in Prague, where, along with his literary studies, he lectured at Charles University. In October 1929, his most patriotic work, "From Nation to Race", was published. He was appointed a teacher at the First Men's High School and reassigned abroad. In 1928–1930 he worked on his great epic poem "Children of the Balkans" in three parts, accompanied by the author's commentary "The History of the Children of the Balkans". In 1936, Alexander Balabanov sent Yana Yazova to Prague to reassure Hristov that no one would kill him and that he would return to Bulgaria in peace. In 1937/1938 the collection of poems "Breakwater" was published, along with the drama "Discoverer", which was the first Bulgarian science fiction drama, it was about a young Bulgarian scientist who discovered mysterious "blue rays".

=== Return to Bulgaria ===
After his return to Bulgaria, the drama "Master and Devil", the studio "What is the Bulgarian", a collection of poems and short stories "Spaces", poetry collections "Game of Abyss" and "Last Fires" and his great memoir "Buried Sofia" were all published. Until his last days he worked on the memoirs "Time and Contemporaries" – a unique document on literary and social morals in Bulgaria.

He was known among his contemporaries as the author of numerous epigrams.

== Family ==
He was the father of astrophysicist Vladimir Hristov (1902–1979) and Anna Hristova.

== Selected works ==
- Songs and Sighs (1896)
- Trembling (1897, poems)
- Evening Shadows (1899, poems)
- At the Crossroads (1901, poems)
- "Selected Poems" (1903, foreword by Ivan Vazov)
- Samodivska Kitka (1905)
- "Pillar of God Fighters" (1905, tragedy in verse)
- "Approximate Horizons" (1911, poems, translations from Russian, German, Italian and French)
- "Hymns of the Dawn, Silent Songs and Legends of Life and Death, First Collection of Poems" (1911, 1939)
- "Sunflowers, Samodiv's Wrist, Intermezo, Royal Sonnets, Second Collection of Poems" (1911, 1939)
- "To Constantinople. Songs" (1912)
- "On the knife!" New Songs and Poems" (1913)
- Boyan the Magician (1914, historical tragedy in verse)
- The Old Warrior (1914, play)
- "Turbulent Years, 1913–1916" (1916, selected articles)
- "Victory Songs, 1913–1916" (1916, 1933, 1940)
- "Road of fire. Military Stories, 1913–1917" (1917)
- Rachenitsa (1917, play)
- The Ohrid Girl (1918, drama)
- "Three Days with the Bold Destroyer" (1918)
- Stories (1919)
- "Ivan Vazov. Short biography", 1920
- Dark Dawns. Novel. 1920 (1991)
- "Feast of Flames". Dram. poem. 1921
- Anthology. 1922 (2nd ed., 1944)
- "Dreamers. A novel one summer night. 1925
- "Children of the Balkans. An Epic Poem, 1928
- "Discoverer", 1933 – "Bulgarian Thought" magazine (in 3 issues)
- "Master and devil. Scenes from the life of Bulgarians in the early tenth century", 1933
- "Breakwater. Poems" 1937
- "Meek and violent madmen" Stories. 1937
- Giurgiu The libretto. 1939
- "Sunflowers" 1939
- "Who Fails the Bulgarian Drama?" 1939
- "Spaces. " 1940
- "A game over the abyss. Poems . 1941
- "Buried Sofia" . Memories. 1944
- "Last fires. Poems" 1944
- Selected Works. With predg. by V. Yosifov. 1953
- Selected Poems. 1968 (Student Library – 4th ed.)
- "Bulgarian speech. Select verses". 1974
- Selected Works, 1975; Essays. In 5 volumes, with a foreword by Krastyo Kuyumdzhiev. 1966–68
- "Poems" . 1980
- "The Old Bivouac" (D. Debelyanov, K. Hristov and others). 1981
- "Firefly. Poems for children and adolescents. 1983
- "Trembling. " With a foreword by Dimitar Avramov. 1987

== Sources ==
- Kiril Genchev Hristov . // Information system of the State Archives.
- CDA F.No. 131K, op. 1, a.e. 15, p. 1
- Koleva, Vanya. "Samodivska kitka" by Kiril Hristov – from the folk song to the lyrical miniature " , Literary World, no. March 7, 2009. Also: Koleva, V. Folklore, Mythology and Literature. Varna, LiterNet, 2007, pp. 75 – 126.
- Sivriev, Sava. "Kiril Hristov or Peyo Yavorov – to the history of a literary dispute" , Literary World, no. February 6, 2009. (Original: Sivriev, S. Literary Archeology. Sofia, Bulgarian writer, 2006. Also: Sivriev, S. Exegesis. From the history of Bulgarian literature. Sofia, "Karina – Mariana Todorova", 2012, p. 214 – 216.
- Sivriev, S. The Wanderer and Time. // Sivriev, S. Exegesis. From the history of Bulgarian literature. Sofia, Karina – Mariana Todorova, 2012, pp. 208 – 213.
- Borislav Gardev, "In Search of Kiril Hristov" Archive of the original from 2016 to 2003–05 in Wayback Machine .
- Argumenti.netLyudmila Parvanova, "Kiril Hristov did not choose the muses" , "Standart" newspaper, March 21, 2004
