= ICCF Bulgaria =

The ICCF Bulgaria belongs to the ICCF national member federations.

== Achievements ==
The Bulgarian correspondence chess players had their biggest achievements at the Final of the VII Correspondence Chess Olympiad where the Bulgarian team (G. Popov, D. Andreev, A. Kiprov, G. Sapundjev, D. Karapchanski, and P. Angelov) took 2nd place and won silver.

== Grandmaster ==
- Mladen Gudyev
- Valentin Dimitrov Iotov
- Nikolai Ninov
- Dr. Georgi Alexandrov Popov

== Senior International Master ==
- Krasimir Bochev
- Iskren Dimov
- Aleksandr Gavazov
- Illa Hristov
- Borislav Kalchev
- Joncho Kalchev
- Karapchanski Dimitar
- Sapundjiev Georgi
- Sitoyanov Zlatin
- Vasilev Vasil
- Vinchev Simeon

== International Master ==
- Dobrotich Andrejev
- Dimitar Krastanov
- Ivan Minkov
- Slavei Mladenov
- Valentin Petrov
- Ivan Popov
- Ing. Lyulin Radulov
- Stefan Sergiev
- Petko Slavchev
- Spas Spasov
- Tenio Tenev
