= Ernst Rojahn =

Norwegian chess player

Personal information
- Born: August 13, 1909 Tønsberg, Norway
- Died: July 24, 1977 (aged 67) Tønsberg, Norway

Chess career
- Country: Norway

Ernst Andreas Rojahn (13 August 1909 – 24 July 1977) was a Norwegian chess player, two times Norwegian Chess Championship winner (1945, 1958), Chess Olympiad individual gold medal winner (1939).

== Biography ==
From the late 1930s to the late 1950s, Ernst Rojahn was one of the leading Norwegian chess players. He twice won the Norwegian Chess Championship (1945, 1958).

Ernst Rojahn played for Norway in the Chess Olympiads:

- In 1939, at first board in the 8th Chess Olympiad in Buenos Aires (+8, =4, -3) and won individual gold medal for group "B",
- In 1952, at fourth board in the 10th Chess Olympiad in Helsinki (+4, =4, -3),
- In 1956, at second reserve board in the 12th Chess Olympiad in Moscow (+1, =4, -3),
- In 1958, at first board in the 13th Chess Olympiad in Munich (+5, =5, -4).
