= Franciszek Sulik =

Polish chess player (1908–1997)

Personal information
- Born: 1908 Gliniany, Russian Empire (nowadays Hlyniany, Ukraine)
- Died: 16 July 1997 (aged 88–89) Adelaide, Australia

Chess career
- Country: Poland (before 1954); Australia (after 1954)

Franciszek (Frank) Sulik (1908– 16 July 1997) was a Polish-Australian chess master.

== Career ==
=== 1934–1938 ===
Before World War II, he lived in Lviv. In 1934, he tied for 2nd-3rd with Henryk Friedman, behind Stepan Popel, in the Lviv championship. In 1935, he tied for 8-9th in Warsaw (3rd POL-ch; Savielly Tartakower won). In 1936, he took 2nd, behind Izak Schächter, in the Lviv-ch. In 1938, he won the Lviv championship.

He played for Poland in Chess Olympiads, and won two team silver medals.

- In 1936, at first reserve board in the unofficial Olympiad in Munich (+2 −3 =2);
- In 1939, at reserve board in the 8th Olympiad in Buenos Aires (+4 −2 =1).

=== 1939–1941 ===
In September 1939, when World War II broke out, Sulik, along with many other participants of the 8th Chess Olympiad decided to stay in Argentina. In 1940, he took 2nd place, behind Aristide Gromer, in Buenos Aires (Bodas de Plata). In 1941, he tied for 10-12th in the Mar del Plata 1941 chess tournament (Gideon Ståhlberg won).

=== 1943–1945 ===
As a reserve officer, he applied to join the Polish Army. He left Argentina on a British battleship to fight in Italy from 1943 to 1945.

== Later career ==
At the end of the war he moved to Scotland, before emigrating to Australia, where he won the South Australian Championship nine times (1954, 1969, 1970, 1971, 1973, 1974, 1976, 1977, and 1978).
