= Emil Karastoichev =

Bulgarian chess player

Personal information
- Born: February 3, 1916 Shumen, Bulgaria
- Died: November 12, 1997 (aged 81) Sofia, Bulgaria

Chess career
- Country: Bulgaria

Emil Stefanov Karastoichev (Bulgarian: Емил Стефанов Карастойчев; 3 February 1916 – 12 November 1997) was a Bulgarian chess player.

== Biography ==
From the end of the 1930s until the early 1960s, Emil Karastoichev was one of the leading Bulgarian chess players. He was multiple times participated in Bulgarian Chess Championship finals. The best result in these tournaments was in 1950, when he shared 2nd - 3rd place. Emil Karastoichev participated in International Chess Tournaments in Bucharest (1951) and Varna (1960).

Emil Karastoichev played for Bulgaria first and second team in the Chess Olympiads:

- In 1939, at fourth board in the 8th Chess Olympiad in Buenos Aires (+3, =3, -3),
- In 1962, at second board in the 15th Chess Olympiad in Varna (+2, =3, -1).

Emil Karastoichev played for Bulgaria in the Men's Chess Balkaniads:

- In 1946, at eight board in the 1st Men's Chess Balkaniad in Belgrade (+2, =1, -0) and won team bronze and individual silver medals,
- In 1947, at sixth board in the 2nd Men's Chess Balkaniad in Sofia (+1, =1, -1) and won team bronze and individual bronze medals.

At the end of his sports career, Emil Karastoichev worked as a chess trainer at the sports society Slavia. Among his pupils is one of the strongest chess women's players in Bulgaria, eleven-time champion of the country Margarita Voiska.
