= John Francis O'Donovan =

Irish chess player

Personal information
- Born: 10 April 1918 Cobh, Ireland
- Died: 5 November 1999 (aged 81) Buenos Aires, Argentina

Chess career
- Country: Ireland

John Francis O'Donovan (10 April 1918 – 5 November 1999), was an Irish chess player.

== Biography ==
At the end of 1930s, John Francis O'Donovan was one of the strongest Irish chess players. He participated mainly in local chess tournaments.

John Francis O'Donovan played for Ireland in the Chess Olympiad:

- In 1939, at second board in the 8th Chess Olympiad in Buenos Aires (+7, =4, -5).

He remained in Argentina after the end of the Chess Olympiad due to the outbreak of World War II.
