= Aristide Gromer =

French chess player

Aristide Gromer (11 April 1908 in Dunkirk – ?) was a French chess master.

Gromer was thrice French Champion (1933, 1937, and 1938).

He tied for 5-6th at Paris 1923 (Victor Kahn won), took 3rd at Biarritz 1926 (André Chéron and Frederic Lazard won), took 2nd, behind Chéron, at Saint-Cloude 1929, shared 2nd with Savielly Tartakower, behind Eugene Znosko-Borovsky, at Paris 1930, took 2nd, behind Aimé Gibaud, at Rouen 1930, took 9th at Paris 1933 (Alexander Alekhine won), took 6th at Sitges 1934 (Andor Lilienthal won), took 2nd, behind Baldur Hoenlinger, at Paris (L'Echiquier) 1938. As a Champion of France, he won a match against Champion of Belgium, Alberic O'Kelly de Galway, (2.5 : 1.5) in December 1938.

Gromer played for France in Chess Olympiads:

- In 1930, at third board in 3rd Chess Olympiad in Hamburg (+4 –6 =1);
- In 1931, at second board in 4th Chess Olympiad in Prague (+3 –9 =4);
- In 1939, at second board in 8th Chess Olympiad in Buenos Aires (+6 –4 =7).

In September 1939, when World War II broke out, Gromer, along with many other participants of the 8th Chess Olympiad (Najdorf, Stahlberg, et al.) decided to stay permanently in Argentina. He won at Buenos Aires (Bodas de Plata) 1940, followed by Franciszek Sulik, Carlos Guimard, etc. He took 7th at Aguas de Sao Pedro/São Paulo 1941 (Erich Eliskases and Guimard won). In May 1942 Gromer returned to France. He took part in the French Championship 1947, where he shared second place with Amédée Gibaud and Nicolas Rossolimo. He died in Paris, at a psychiatric institution, though the date is not known.
