= Paul Baender =

German-Bolivian chess player

Paul Baender, also known in Spanish as Pablo Baender (30 November 1906 – 18 December 1985), was a German–Bolivian chess player and functionary.

Born in Rosdzin, now part of Katowice, Upper Silesia, he moved to Görlitz in 1921. When Nazis came to power in 1933, Baender, being a Jew, fled to Prague, Czechoslovakia. In November 1937, he emigrated to La Paz, Bolivia. Baender played for Bolivia in the 8th Chess Olympiad at Buenos Aires 1939.

After World War II, he came back to Germany (Soviet occupation zone) in 1947. He became a communist politician (Staatssekretär in 1950–1952) in German Democratic Republic, and also the President of the GDR Chess Federation (Präsident des Deutschen Schachbunds) until 1953. Baender was arrested on 15 December 1952 during a stalinist purge with antisemitic ressentiments. After Nikita Khrushchev's secret speech to the delegates to the 20th Congress of the Communist Party of the Soviet Union in Moscow, he was freed in 1956. Baender died in 1985 in Berlin.

== See also ==
- Bender (surname)
