= Gunnar Friedemann =

Estonian chess player (1909–1944)

Gunnar Friedemann in 1939

Gunnar Friedemann (22 September 1909 in Tallinn – 2 February 1944) was an Estonian chess master.

== Biography ==
Friedemann played several times in Estonian championships at Tallinn. In 1932, he tied for 3rd-4th with Johannes Türn (4th EST–ch, Leho Laurine won). In 1933, he won the 5th EST–ch. In 1934, he took 3rd, behind Ilmar Raud and Paul Felix Schmidt, at the 6th EST–ch. In 1935, he took 2nd, behind Paul Keres, at the 7th EST–ch. In 1935, he lost a match against Keres at Tallinn (+1 –2 =0). In 1939, he took 3rd at the 10th EST–ch (Raud won).

Friedemann played for Estonia in Chess Olympiads:

- In 1935, on second board in the 6th Chess Olympiad in Warsaw (+6 –6 =7);
- In 1936, on third board in 3rd unofficial Olympiad in Munich (+9 –5 =6);
- In 1937, on reserve board in the 7th Chess Olympiad in Stockholm (+6 –2 =5);
- In 1939, on fourth board in the 8th Chess Olympiad in Buenos Aires (+11 –3 =3).

Estonia won bronze medal being very consistent and firm team at Buenos Aires 1939. Keres (1st board) and Friedemann (4th board) contributed mostly to the success. Friedemann won gold individual medal.

During World War II, he twice played against Keres in team matches in 1940. He died in 1944 at the age of 34 while fighting for the German Army on the Eastern Front.
