= Jón Guðmundsson =

Icelandic chess player (1904–1980)

Personal information
- Born: 1904
- Died: 1980 (aged 75–76)

Chess career
- Country: Iceland

Jón Guðmundsson (1904 – 1980) was an Icelandic chess player, three-times Icelandic Chess Championship winner (1932, 1936, 1937), Chess Olympiad and an individual gold medal winner (1939).

== Biography ==
In the 1930s Jón Guðmundsson was one of the most promising young chess players in Iceland. He won the Icelandic Chess Championship thrice (1932, 1936, 1937). He was part of the historic team that won the President's Cup in Argentina at the 1939 Chess Olympiad. There, Jón defeated all his opponents in the finals, but then retired from chess.

Jón Guðmundsson played for Iceland in the Chess Olympiads:

- In 1930, in the 3rd Chess Olympiad in Hamburg (+3, =4, -10),
- In 1937, at second reserve board in the 7th Chess Olympiad in Stockholm (+4, =5, -7),
- In 1939, at third board in the 8th Chess Olympiad in Buenos Aires (+11, =0, -3) and won individual gold medal for group "B", showing a hundred percent result in this group - 10 wins in 10 games.

After this success in 1939 Chess Olympiad, Jón Guðmundsson rarely participated in chess tournaments.
