= Guðmundur Arnlaugsson =

Icelandic chess player (1913–1996)

Personal information
- Born: 1 September 1913 Reykjavík, Iceland
- Died: 9 November 1996 (aged 83) Reykjavík, Iceland

Chess career
- Country: Iceland

Guðmundur Arnlaugsson (1 September 1913 – 9 November 1996) was an Icelandic chess player. He was an Icelandic Chess Championship winner in 1949 and a Chess Olympiad individual gold medal winner at the 8th Chess Olympiad in 1939.

== Biography ==
In 1936, Guðmundur Arnlaugsson graduated from mathematics study in University of Copenhagen. Later he worked as a teacher at the secondary school in Copenhagen. After World War II he returned to Iceland and worked in various colleges and universities. In 1979, he was awarded the title of Honorary Doctor of University of Iceland about his education activities.

From the late 1930s to mid-1950s, Guðmundur Arnlaugsson was one of the leading Icelandic chess players. In 1949, he won the Icelandic Chess Championship. Guðmundur Arnlaugsson played for Iceland in the Chess Olympiads:

- In 1939, at reserve board in the 8th Chess Olympiad in Buenos Aires (+6, =3, -1) and won individual gold medal for group "B",
- In 1952, at second reserve board in the 10th Chess Olympiad in Helsinki (+4, =0, -2),
- In 1954, at second reserve board in the 11th Chess Olympiad in Amsterdam (+0, =1, -1).

In 1936, in Munich Guðmundur Arnlaugsson played for Iceland in the 3rd unofficial Chess Olympiad.

Guðmundur Arnlaugsson was also known as a chess tournament arbiter from the early 1970s. In 1972, he became an FIDE International Arbiter. In 1981, he was one of the arbiters in Anatoly Karpov and Viktor Korchnoi World Chess Championship title match. Guðmundur Arnlaugsson was also a chess commentator and promoter on Iceland radio and television.
