= Mikhail Kantardzhiev =

Bulgarian chess player

Personal information
- Born: October 24, 1914 Lom, Bulgaria
- Died: November 20, 2002 (aged 88) Sofia, Bulgaria

Chess career
- Country: Bulgaria

Mikhail Kantardzhiev (Bulgarian: Михаил Кантарджиев; 24 October 1914 – 20 November 2002) was a Bulgarian chess player, Chess Olympiad individual gold medal winner (1939).

== Biography ==
From the second half of the 1930s until the end of the 1940s, Mikhail Kantardzhiev was one of the leading Bulgarian chess players. He was multiple times participated in Bulgarian Chess Championship finals. The best result in these tournaments was in 1937, when he became a Bulgarian chess vice champion.

Mikhail Kantardzhiev played for Bulgaria in the Chess Olympiad:

- In 1939, at fourth board in the 8th Chess Olympiad in Buenos Aires (+8, =1, -2) and won individual gold medal for group "B".

After World War II Mikhail Kantardzhiev has become known as a chess writer and journalist. In 1945 he published the first chess book in Bulgarian - Шахматно ръководство ("Chess Guide"). In 1947 Mikhail Kantardzhiev was one of the founders of the Bulgarian chess magazine Шахматна мисъл. In 1956 he published the book Първи шахматни уроци ("First Chess Lessons").
