= Barbato Rometti =

Barbato Rometti (full Italian name: Barbato Nicola Rometti; full French name: Barbato Nicolas Rometti; also Bernard Rometti) (23 June 1896, in Umbertide, Italy – 22 August 1975, in Nice, France) was a French chess player.

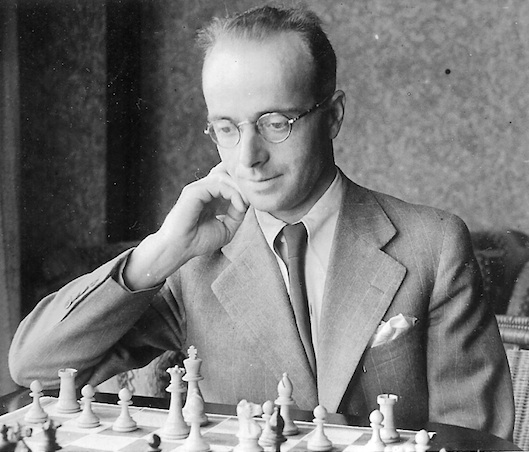
Barbato Rometti

Born in Italy he was naturalized French on 1 September 1929.

At the beginning of his career, he played at Nice 1930 (B tournament). He took 2nd, behind Alexander Alekhine, at Nice 1937 (Quadrangular).

Rometti played many times in French Chess Championship; shared 2nd at La Baule 1932 (Tournoi subsidiaire), tied for 5-6th at Sarreguemines 1933, shared 2nd, behind Amédée Gibaud, at St Alban les Eaux 1935, tied for 4-5th at Paris 1936, tied for 5-8th at Toulouse 1937, tied for 9-11th at Nice 1938, took 3rd at Roubaix 1945, tied for 11-12th at Bordeaux 1946, took 7th at Vichy 1951, took 6th at Charleville 1952, shared 5th at Reims 1959, tied for 10-14th at Paris 1962, tied for 12-14th at Paris 1963, took 11th at Montpellier 1964, and finally took 24th at Dunkerque 1965.

He played, as Barbato Rometti, for France in 3rd unofficial Chess Olympiad at Munich 1936, and in 8th Chess Olympiad at Buenos Aires 1939, and, as Bernard Rometti, for Monaco at Tel Aviv 1964.

He also participated in friendly matches France vs. Switzerland and France vs. Australia in 1946, and represented France in the 1st Clare Benedict Chess Cup at Mont Pélérin 1953.
