= Abraham Helman =

Canadian chess player

Personal information
- Born: 10 December 1907
- Died: 16 March 1952 (aged 44) Vancouver, Canada

Chess career
- Country: Canada

Abraham Helman (10 December 1907 – 16 March 1952) was a Canadian chess player.

== Biography ==
Abraham Helman was silver medalist of the Canadian Chess Championship in 1933. Also he was Manitoba Chess Champion in 1933 and 1944, and British Columbia Chess Champion in 1947 and 1948, and British Columbia Fast Chess Champion in 1948.

Abraham Helman played for Canada in the Chess Olympiad:

- In 1939, at reserve board in the 8th Chess Olympiad in Buenos Aires (+1, =0, -2).

Abraham Helman was born on the territory of the Russian Empire. He came to Canada no later than 1926. Abraham Helman lived in Winnipeg. He was a member of the Winnipeg Jewish Chess Club. In 1945 he moved to Vancouver. Together with D. Creamer and F. Antikov, Abraham Helman founded the Vancouver Jewish Chess Club and became its first president.

Abraham Helman was a businessman. During his stay in Vancouver, he was the owner of a furniture store Tip Top Furniture. Abraham Helman was supposed to participate in the 1951 Canadian Chess Championship, which had the status of a World Chess Championship Zonal tournament, but declined the invitation, citing illness. He died suddenly of heart failure.

In 1952, in memory of Abraham Helman, a memorial tournament in fast chess was held in Vancouver (won by J. Taylor and C. Millar). Also dedicated to Helman was a fast chess tournament organized in 1953, which took place in Winnipeg during the Canadian Chess Championship (tournament won by Daniel Yanofsky).
