= Alberto López Arce =

Cuban chess player

Personal information
- Born: 23 April 1907
- Died: unknown

Chess career
- Country: Cuba

Alberto López Arce (23 April 1907 — unknown) was a Cuban chess player. He is noted for his involvement in an incident at the 8th Chess Olympiad, a team tournament where then-current champion Alexander Alekhine had expected to play the previous champion José Raúl Capablanca, also of Cuba. The Cuban team instead assigned López Arce to play Alekhine in a game which Alekhine quickly won.

The 8th Olympiad coincided with the outbreak of the Second World War, which disrupted the tournament.

== 8th Olympiad ==
Alberto López Arce competed in the 8th Chess Olympiad as part of the tournament's Cuban team. Held in Buenos Aires, the Olympiad was a round-robin tournament, hosting teams of five players representing each of the participating countries. Throughout the qualifications and final round he performed poorly, winning just one game (against Povilas Vaitonis), drawing three, and losing eleven.

During the tournament Alekhine and Capablanca had an "extremely sharp rivalry" to log the best individual performance. Alekhine had expected to meet Capablanca in a late 12th-round game; instead, the Cuban team assigned López Arce to play the champion, in order to protect Capablanca's individual performance statistic. Alekhine was "furious", and proceeded to defeat López Arce in a 25-move miniature which opened with the Ruy Lopez. According to Garry Kasparov,

Alekhine vs. López Arce, Buenos Aires 1939

Position: g1 white king, d1 white rook, a1 white rook, h2 white pawn, g2 white pawn, f2 white pawn, b2 white pawn, g3 white bishop, d3 white pawn, b3 white bishop, d4 black pawn, b4 black knight, d5 black knight, b5 white pawn, c6 white knight, h7 black pawn, g7 black pawn, f7 black pawn, b7 black bishop, g8 black king, f8 black rook, a8 black rook

Final position following 25. Nc6, at which point López Arce resigned.

So as not to spoil things, the ex-champion (Capablanca) even missed the France-Cuba match. 'On the day of the match,' an eye-witness recalled, 'Alekhine arrived in the tournament hall half an hour early and walked resolutely around the stage, working himself up for the game with Capablanca. He was beside himself when the Cubans turned out with a reserve (López Arce). Alekhine crushed him in (20) moves, but he was unable to hide his anger.'

— Garry Kasparov

At the conclusion of the Olympiad's final round Capablanca had secured the best individual performance, with 8½-11 (or 77%), while Alekhine had 7½-10 (or 75%).

=== Alekhine vs. López Arce, 1939 ===
The game began as a Ruy Lopez, developing into the four knights (Tarrasch) variation (ECO C77) during the opening moves. The players castled kingside on the seventh move. Alekhine advanced his knights early, exchanging one for a black bishop with an early check. During subsequent moves Alekhine captured four pawns. López Arce captured just two pawns, failing to recapture and equalize for the lost material. The players traded queens on the 23rd move. White's 25th move, Nc6, was the final move played, forking a black knight at b4 and a black pawn at d4. Alekhine had won a material advantage as well as an advantageous position. He was up two pawns, including a passed pawn at b5, and had a bishop for López Arce's knight, retaining the bishop pair. Rather than continue, López Arce resigned.

1.e4 e5 2.Nf3 Nc6 3.Bb5 a6 4.Ba4 Nf6 5.Nc3 b5 6.Bb3 Be7 7.O-O O-O 8.Nd5 B♭7 9.Nxe7+ Nxe7 10.Nxe5 c5 11.d3 d5 12.exd5 Nexd5 13.Re1 Qb6 14.c4 Nc7 15.Bg5 Rad8 16.cxb5 axb5 17.Qc1 Qd6 18.a4 Rde8 19.Bf4 Qd4 20.Bg3 Ncd5 21.axb5 Nb4 22.Qc3 Nfd5 23.Qxd4 cxd4 24.Red1 Ra8 25.Nc6 1-0 (Resignation)
