= Walter Holowach =

Canadian chess player

Personal information
- Born: 3 November 1909 Edmonton, Alberta, Canada
- Died: 9 April 2008 (aged 98) Edmonton, Alberta, Canada

Chess career
- Country: Canada
- Title: Alberta Chess Champion (1946–1950)

Walter Holowach (3 November 1909 – 9 April 2008) was a Canadian chess player and musician.

== Biography ==
Walter Holowach was Ukrainian. He graduated with Doctorate in violin in Vienna Conservatory. He played first violin in Vienna Philharmonic Orchestra. After moving to Edmonton, Canada Walter Holowach was violinist in Edmonton Symphony Orchestra but from 1957 to 1958 he was Concert Master in this orchestra. Walter Holowach was founder the Empire Opera Company and family business company Expert Dyers and Cleaners Ltd.. During the World War II he worked also as code breaker.

From the late 1930s to the early 1950s, Walter Holowach was one of Canada's leading chess players. He was multiple participant in the Canadian Chess Championships. From 1946 to 1950 Walter Holowach five times in row won Alberta Chess Championship without losing a game.

Walter Holowach played for Canada in the Chess Olympiad:

- In 1939, at fourth board in the 8th Chess Olympiad in Buenos Aires (+5, =6, -4).
