= Ilmar Raud =

Estonian chess player (1913–1941)

Ilmar Raud (30 April 1913 – 13 July 1941) was an Estonian chess master.

== Biography ==
Raud was born in Viljandi, in the Governorate of Livonia of the Russian Empire (now Estonia). He played several times in the Estonian championships at Tallinn. In 1933, he tied for 3rd-5th at the 5th EST–ch. The event was won by Gunnar Friedemann. In 1934, he won the 6th EST–ch. In 1936, he took 3rd at the 8th EST–ch. The event was won by Paul Felix Schmidt. In 1937, he took 7th at Parnu (Schmidt won). In 1937, he took 2nd, behind Schmidt, at the 9th EST–ch. In 1939, he won the 10th EST–ch.

He played for Estonia on fourth board in the 6th Chess Olympiad at Warsaw 1935 (+4 –4 =7), on second board in 3rd unofficial Olympiad at Munich 1936 (+7 –8 =5), on second board in the 7th Olympiad at Stockholm (+7 –2 =8), on second board in the 8th Olympiad at Buenos Aires 1939 (+7 –5 =5). The Estonian team (Paul Keres, Raud, Schmidt, Friedemann, Johannes Türn) took 3rd place, behind Germany and Poland, in the last pre-war Chess Olympiad.

In September 1939, when World War II broke out, Raud, along with many other participants of the 8th Chess Olympiad, decided to stay in Argentina.

Raud took 14th in the Mar del Plata 1941 chess tournament (Gideon Ståhlberg won). He died in Buenos Aires, Argentina, at the age of 28.
