= Albert Becker (chess player) =

Austrian-Argentine chess master (1896–1984)

Alberto Becker
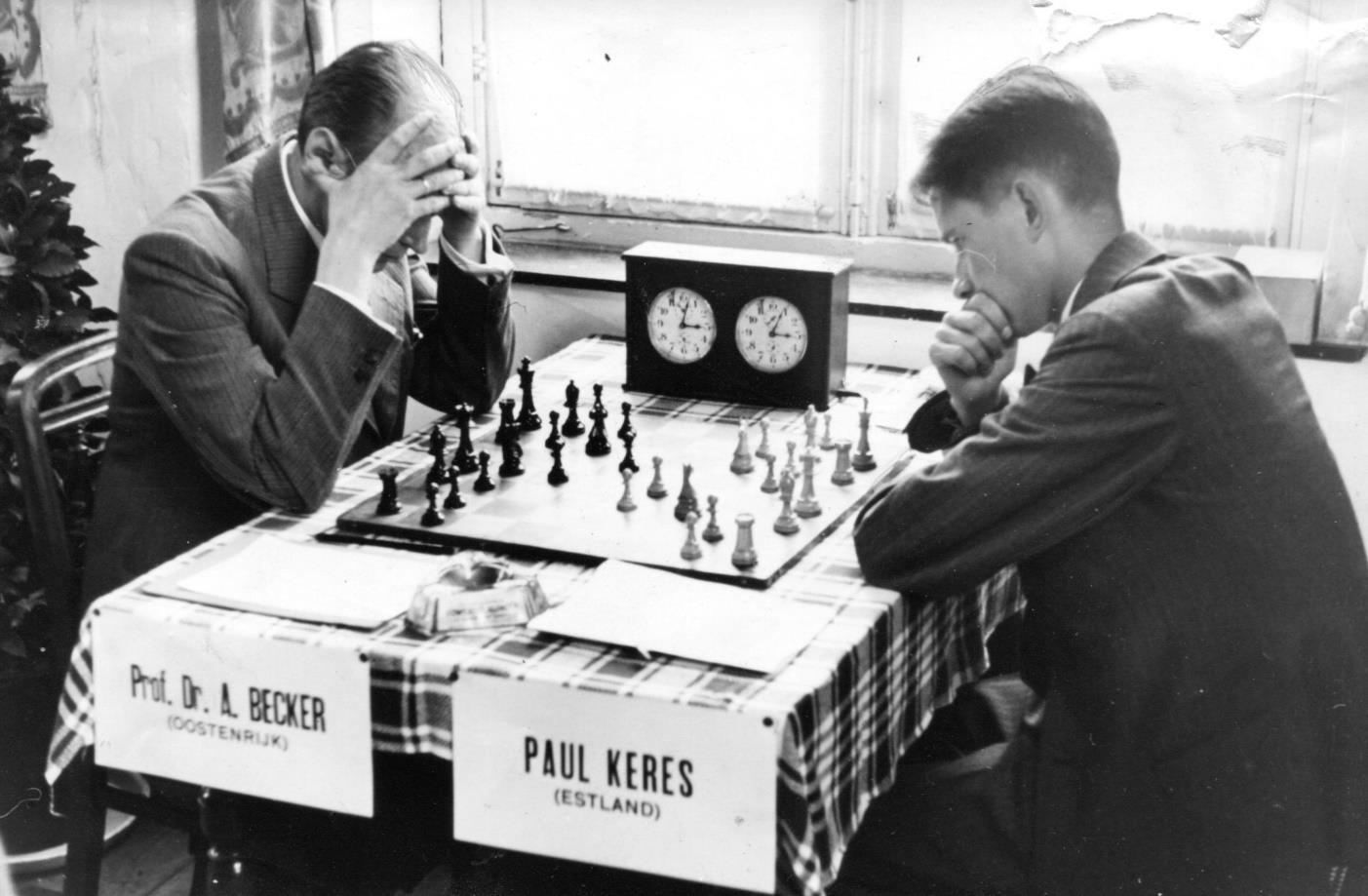

Personal information
- Born: Albert Becker; 5 September 1896 Vienna, Austro-Hungarian Empire
- Died: 7 May 1984 (aged 87) Vicente López, Argentina

Chess career
- Country: Austro-Hungarian Empire → Austria (before 1938); Germany (1938–1940); Argentina (after 1940)

Albert "Alberto" Becker (5 September 1896 in Vienna – 7 May 1984 in Vicente López), was an Austrian–Argentine chess master.

== Chess career ==
=== Early career ===
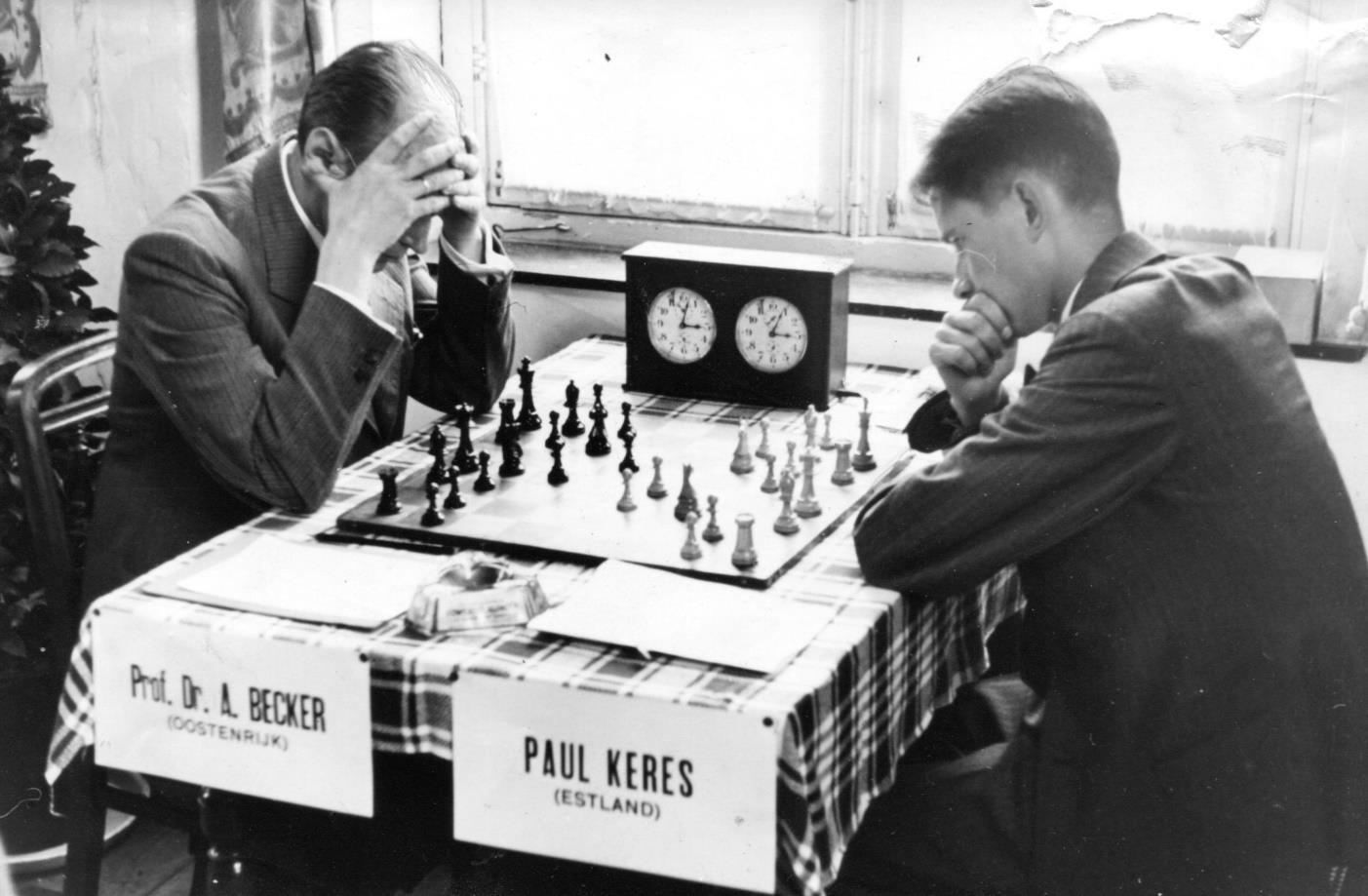
Albert Becker vs. Paul Keres (1936)

In 1921, he won in Vienna. In 1923, he tied for 4-5th in Frankfurt (23rd DSB Kongress). The event was won by Ernst Grünfeld. In 1924, he tied for 2nd-3rd with Carls, behind Wagner, in Bremen. In 1924, he won a match against Heinrich Wagner (+3 –1 =4) in Hamburg. In 1924, he won ahead of Post and Gruber in Vienna. In 1925, he tied for 5-7th in Breslau (24th DSB Kongress). The event was won by Efim Bogoljubow. In 1925, he tied for 1st-2nd with Wolf in Vienna. In 1926, he tied for 4-5th in Vienna (10th Trebitsch-Turnier). The event was won by Rudolf Spielmann. In 1927, he tied for 1st with Friedrich Sämisch in Mittweida. In 1927, he tied for 1st with Hans Müller in Vienna. In 1928, he tied for 2nd-5th in Vienna. In July–August 1928, he took 8th in the Amateur World Championship in The Hague. The event was won by Max Euwe. In 1928, he took 7th in Vienna. In 1929, he tied for 5-7th in Karlovy Vary, and also inaugurated the Vera Menchik Club as the first member. The event was won by Aron Nimzowitsch. In 1930, he took 3rd in Ebensee (Hans Kmoch won).

In July 1931, Becker played for Austria at fourth board (+10 –3 =1) in the 4th Chess Olympiad in Prague. He won individual gold medal there. In 1931, he won in Vienna (14th Trebitsch). In 1932, he won in Vienna (15th Trebitsch). In 1934, he tied for 1st with Erich Eliskases in Linz. In 1934, he tied for 7-9th in Bad Liebwerda (Lázně Libverda). The event (13.Kongreß des Deutschen Schachverbandes in der Tschechoslowakei) was won by Salo Flohr. In 1934, he won in Vienna (17th Trebitsch). In 1935, he took 3rd, behind László Szabó and Ernő Gereben in Tatatovaros. In 1935, he tied for 3rd-5th in Vienna (18th Trebitsch). In 1936, he took 11th in Zandvoort (Reuben Fine won). In August 1936, he played for Austria at second board (+11 –2 =5) in unofficial Olympiad in Munich. Becker won individual bronze medal there. In 1937, he took 4th in Teplitz-Schönau (Karl Gilg won). In 1937, he took 3rd in Vienna (Quadrangular). The event was won by Paul Keres.

=== Post Anschluss ===
After the Anschluss in March 1938, he tied for 1st with Ludwig Rellstab in Berlin. In July–August 1938, he tied for 5-7th in Bad Oeynhausen (5th GER-ch). The event was won by Eliskases. In December 1938, he tied for 4-5th in Karlsruhe. In June 1939, he took 5th in Vienna (Eliskases won).

Albert Becker was a Captain of the German team in the 8th Chess Olympiad at Buenos Aires 1939. He played at fourth board (+6 –3 =3), and won team gold medal. In September 1939, when World War II broke out, he along with all members of the German team (Eliskases, Michel, Engels, Becker, Reinhardt) and many other participants of this Olympiad decided to stay permanently in Argentina.

In 1944, Alberto Becker took 3rd, behind José María Cristiá and Pablo Michel, in Buenos Aires (La Regence).

Becker was awarded the International Master (IM) title in 1953.

== Vera Menchik Club ==
When Vera Menchik entered the Carlsbad 1929 chess tournament, at a time it was unusual for a woman to play against masters, Becker is said to have joked that any player she defeated would join the "Vera Menchik Club".

Becker went on to become the first member of the "club".

This story may be apocryphal, however, given that the earliest known source for it is a book printed in 1980, 51 years after when it is said to have occurred. In addition to Becker, the "club" eventually included Conel Hugh O'Donel Alexander, Abraham Baratz, Eero Böök, Edgard Colle, Max Euwe, Harry Golombek, Mir Sultan Khan, Frederic Lazard, Jacques Mieses, Stuart Milner-Barry, Karel Opočenský, Brian Reilly, Samuel Reshevsky, Friedrich Sämisch, Lajos Steiner, George Alan Thomas, William Winter, and Frederick Yates.
