= Alberto Ismodes Dulanto =

Peruvian chess player

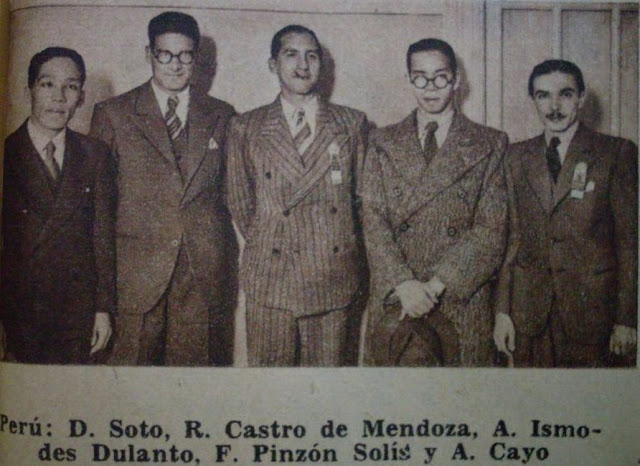

Personal information
- Born: 1910
- Died: unknown

Chess career
- Country: Peru

Alberto Ismodes Dulanto (1910 – unknown), was a Peruvian chess player.

== Biography ==
Alberto Ismodes Dulanto was one of the strongest Peruvian chess players of the 1930s (It was only from 1942 that the history of the official Peruvian Chess Championships began). Ismodes played for Peru in the 8th Chess Olympiad.

In the tournament, his match with Daniel Yanofsky was praised by World Chess Champion Alexander Alekhine for its quality.

- In 1939, at first board in the 8th Chess Olympiad in Buenos Aires (+1, =3, -11).
