= Laura Esther Rodríguez Dulanto =

Peruvian physician

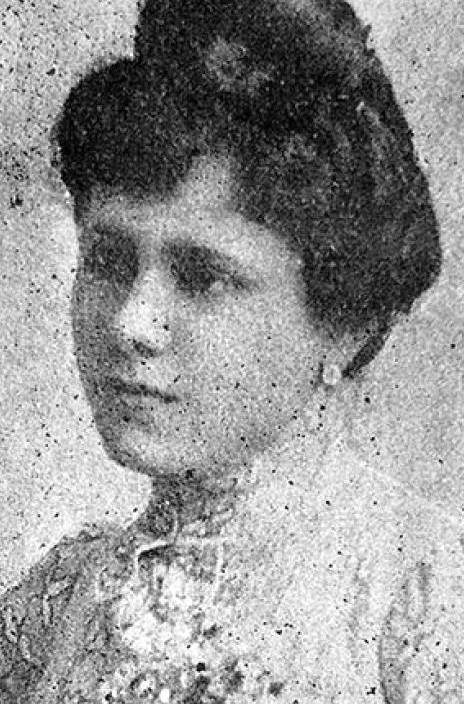
Dulanto in 1899

Laura Esther Rodríguez Dulanto (18 October 1872 – 6 July 1919) was the first female physician in Peru.

== Biography ==
She was born October 18, 1872, in Supe (then Chancay District, currently department of Lima), as the daughter of Marcelo Rodriguez and Cristina Dulanto. Having finished the basic studies that were available to her in her hometown, she moved with her parents to Lima. She completed her primary education and, after the arduous efforts of her parents appealing to the educational authorities, she was granted the possibility of periodic examinations before a Special Jury appointed by the Ministry of Education for the purpose of advancing her career. She thus became the first woman in Peru to enter university, in May 1892. In 1899 she obtained the degree of Bachelor of Medicine. She finally vowed as physician and surgeon on October 25, 1900, at the Faculty of Medicine of San Marcos University. Although another woman, the Ecuadorian Inés Guideline, also attended the school, there is no proof that she obtained any title.

She specialized in the practice of gynaecology, publishing numerous papers in this area, including papers on ovarian cysts and uterine fibroids. However, she also studied tuberculosis, presenting a paper on the subject at the Sixth Pan American Medical Congress held in 1913. She taught and practiced her trade in the Normal School for Women, the Liceo Fanning, the Convent of the Conception and of the Nazarenes. She also organized a School of Nursing, personally taking charge of dictating the course of Anatomy, Physiology and Hygiene.

Given the escalation of border conflict between Peru and Ecuador, in 1910 she founded the Patriotic Union of Ladies; she also donated surgical equipment for the implementation of the Military Hospital.

She died in Lima after a long illness on July 6, 1919.

Her initiative paved the way for other women in her country, and in 1906 Julia Iglesias became the first Peruvian pharmaceutical graduate in San Marcos. It would, however, more than a quarter century until another Peruvian woman obtained the medical degree; Maria Mercedes Cisneros did so in 1929.

== Tribute ==
On 18 October 2018, to commemorate what would have been her 146th birthday, Google released a Google Doodle celebrating her.

== Bibliography ==
- Salaverry Oswaldo García and Gustavo Delgado Matallana (2000). Historia de la medicina peruana en el siglo XX, Volume 1, pages 1278 and 1279.
- Salaverry Oswaldo García and Gustavo Delgado Matallana (2000). Peruvian History of medicine in the twentieth century. UNMSM.
- Valcárcel Esparza, Carlos Daniel (1981). History at the University of San Marcos (1551–1980). Caracas: National Academy of History.
