= Meir Rauch =

Israeli chess player

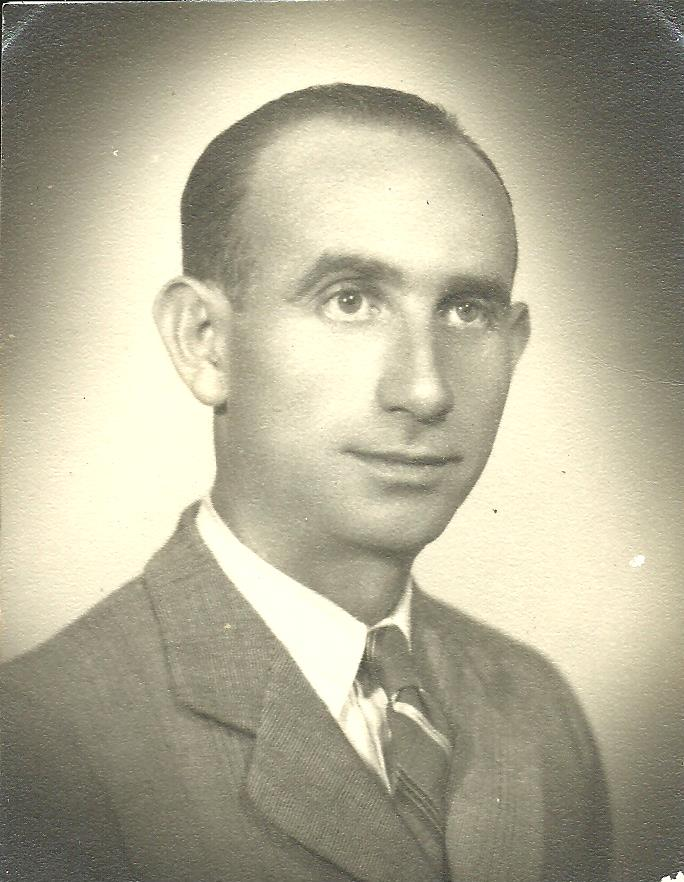
Meir Rauch in 1944, Buenos Aires, Argentina

Meir Rauch (15 October 1909 – 1 August 1983) was a Polish-born Israeli chess master.

Meir Rauch was born in Zolynia, Poland. In August–September 1939, he played in the 8th Chess Olympiad on the first reserve board (won 4, lost 2 and drew 7) in Buenos Aires. When World War II broke out, Rauch, along with many other participants of that Olympiad, decided to stay permanently in Argentina. He immigrated to Israel in 1945.

Around 1960 Rauch was still a member of the Réti chess club in Tel Aviv. He held the Israeli record for a blindfold simultaneous game (8 players).
