= Zelman Kleinstein =

Israeli chess player

Zelman Kleinstein (Latv: Zalamans Kleinsteins) in Dvinsk (now Daugavpils in Latvia), (1910 or 1912 – ?) was a Palestine/Israeli chess player.

He played for Palestine (British Mandate) team in the 8th Chess Olympiad on fourth board (won 2, lost 6 and drew 2) at Buenos Aires 1939. In September 1939, when World War II broke out, Kleinstein, along with many other participants of that Olympiad, decided to stay permanently in Argentina.

Around 1970 he was still playing for San Telmo club of Argentina.
