= Alexander Kiprov =

Bulgarian chess player

Personal information
- Full name: Alexander Alexandrov Kiprov
- Born: 11 September 1916 Sofia, Bulgaria
- Died: 6 June 2000 (aged 83) Sofia, Bulgaria

Chess career
- Country: Bulgaria

Alexander Alexandrov Kiprov (Bulgarian: Александър Александров Кипров; 11 September 1916 – 6 June 2000) was a Bulgarian chess player and chess administrator.

== Biography ==
Alexander Kiprov studied law at Sofia University. He worked as a judge.

Alexander Kiprov played for Bulgaria in the Chess Olympiad:

- In 1939, at third board in the 8th Chess Olympiad in Buenos Aires (+2, =7, -4).

Alexander Kiprov played for Bulgaria in the unofficial Chess Olympiad:

- In 1936, at fourth board in the 3rd unofficial Chess Olympiad in Munich (+2, =3, -14).

Alexander Kiprov played for Bulgaria in the Men's Chess Balkaniad:

- In 1946, at sixth board in the 1st Men's Chess Balkaniad in Belgrade (+1, =1, -1) and won team bronze and individual silver medals.

Later Alexander Kiprov played correspondence chess actively. In 1964 he won the Bulgarian Correspondence Chess Championship, and later helped the Bulgarian national team to win silver medals at the 7th Correspondence Chess Olympiad (1972–1976).

For many years Alexander Kiprov was vice president of Bulgarian Chess Federation. Also he was author of many chess books.

== Bibliography ==
- Терминология на шахматната игра (Terminology of the chess game), Publishing house „Медицина и физкултура“, Sofia 1957;
- XV шахматна олимпиада (XV Chess Olympiad), Andrey Malchev/Oleg Neikirch/Alexander Kiprov, Publishing house „Медицина и физкултура“, 1963;
- Идеите на шахматните комбинации (The ideas of chess combinations), 1974;
- Как бихте играли? (How would you play?), Publishing house „Медицина и физкултура“, Sofia, 1977;
- Да се посмеем, шахматисти (Let's laugh, chess players), Publishing house „Медицина и физкултура“, Sofia, 1985;
- 50 години кореспондентен шах в България (50 years of correspondence chess in Bulgaria), Alexander Kiprov/Georgy Sapundzhiev/Stefan Sergiev, Publishing house „Национален център за шахматна информация“, Sofia, 1990.
