= 8th Chess Olympiad =

1939 chess tournament in Buenos Aires, Argentina

The 8th Chess Olympiad (Spanish: La 8^{a} Olimpíada de ajedrez), organised by the Fédération Internationale des Échecs (FIDE) and comprising a team tournament, took place between August 21 and September 19, 1939, in the Politeama Theatre in Buenos Aires, Argentina. The 1939 Women's World Championship was contested at the same time and venue.

The event coincided with the outbreak of World War II. Following the end of this Olympiad, the Chess Olympiad was suspended indefinitely due to economic concerns in conjunction with World War II; the next Chess Olympiad would not be held until 1950.

== Background ==
There was a record number of entries, with twenty-seven teams taking part. This compared with the nineteen nations participating at the previous Olympiad; the substantial increase being mostly due to the interest shown by other Central and South American nations, including Cuba, led by former World Champion José Raúl Capablanca on the top board.

Prominent Austrian players Erich Eliskases and Albert Becker were playing under the German flag and official sources referred to the Czechoslovak team as 'Bohemia & Moravia'. Two of the teams that did not compete were those that finished first and second at Stockholm, namely the United States and Hungary. Indeed, some nations found the cost of sending a team such a distance for a lengthy period prohibitively expensive.

Following the Preliminaries, the teams were split into Final Group A or Final Group B, with the former contesting the Hamilton-Russell Cup and the latter playing for the 'Copa Argentina', a consolation trophy presented by the Argentine President.

== Preliminaries ==
The preliminaries were played from August 21–31, 1939. There were three groups of 7 teams and a group of 6. From a round-robin format, the top four in each group then went forward to Final A, the remainder to Final B. Group winners were Bohemia & Moravia (tied with Poland, Group 1), Latvia (Group 2), Argentina (Group 3) and Sweden (Group 4).

== Finals ==
The finals commenced on September 1, the very date of the outbreak of World War II. This led to much confusion amongst the European teams, although most players wanted to continue. The England team, despite having qualified for Final A, were the only team to return home immediately and their place was not filled. Three of five English representatives: Conel Hugh O'Donel Alexander, Stuart Milner-Barry, and Harry Golombek were soon recruited into Bletchley Park, the British codebreaking centre during World War II.

Concerning the remaining delegations, a crisis assembly was called to vote on how to proceed; this comprised team captains, the hosts and organisers. Leading roles were reportedly taken by World Champion Alexander Alekhine (France), Savielly Tartakower (Poland), Albert Becker (Germany) and the president of the Argentine Chess Federation, Augusto de Muro. The verdict was to continue with the Olympiad.

The political ramifications continued, however, when it became apparent that six of the scheduled finals matches could not be played due to tensions aroused by the war. After considerable deliberation and negotiation, a total of six matches (GER-POL, GER-FRA, GER-PAL, B&M-POL, B&M-FRA, and ARG-PAL) were declared drawn 2–2 by mutual forfeit and this allowed the remainder of the competition to be played out to a conclusion.

== Aftermath ==
At the conclusion of events, many participants decided to stay in Argentina or moved elsewhere in South America, rather than face an uncertain future by returning to a Europe in the midst of war. The players affected included Miguel Najdorf, Paulino Frydman, Gideon Ståhlberg, Erich Eliskases, Paul Michel, Ludwig Engels, Albert Becker, Heinrich Reinhardt, Jiří Pelikán, Karel Skalička, Markas Luckis, Movsas Feigins, Ilmar Raud, Moshe Czerniak, Meir Rauch, Victor Winz, Aristide Gromer, Franciszek Sulik, Adolf Seitz, Chris De Ronde, John Francis O'Donovan, Zelman Kleinstein, Sonja Graf and Paulette Schwartzmann. Most of them were Jewish and had come to Buenos Aires in August 1939 on the Belgian steamer "Piriapolis". The ship has therefore come to be regarded as the epitome of Noah's Ark for a generation of chess players. Significantly, all five members of the German team (Eliskases, Michel, Engels, Becker, Reinhardt) also chose not to return to Nazi Germany.

== Results ==
=== Final A ===
#	Country	Players	Points
1	Germany	Eliskases, Michel, Engels, Becker, Reinhardt	36
2	Poland	Tartakower, Najdorf, Frydman, Regedziński, Sulik	35½
3	Estonia	Keres, Raud, Schmidt, Friedemann, Türn	33½
4	Sweden	Ståhlberg, Lundin, Bergkvist, Danielsson, Ekenberg	33
5	Argentina	Grau, Piazzini, Bolbochán Jac., Guimard, Pleci	32½
6	Bohemia and Moravia	Opočenský, Foltys, Pelikán, Skalička, Zíta	32
7	Latvia	Petrovs, Apšenieks, Feigins, Endzelīns, Melngailis	31½
8	Netherlands	van Scheltinga, Cortlever, De Groot, Prins, De Ronde	30½
9	Palestine	Czerniak, Foerder, Winz, Kleinstein, Rauch	26
10	France	Alekhine, Gromer, Kahn, Rometti, Dez	24½
11	Cuba	Capablanca, López, Alemán, Blanco, Planas	22½
12	Chile	Castillo, Flores, Letelier, Salas Romo, Reed	22
13	Lithuania	Mikėnas, Vaitonis, Luckis, Tautvaišas, Andrašiūnas	22
14	Brazil	Trompowsky, Silva Rocha, Cruz W., Souza Mendes, Cruz Filho	21
15	Denmark	Enevoldsen, Poulsen, Christensen, Sørensen, Larsen	17½
16	England	Alexander, Thomas, Milner-Barry, Golombek, Wood	-

Prizes for best individual performances (based on results in the final only) went to:

- Board 1: (Cuba) José Raúl Capablanca 8½ / 11 = 77.3%
- Board 2: (Poland) Miguel Najdorf (9/12) = 75.0%
- Board 3: (Germany) Ludwig Engels 9½ / 11 = 86.4%
- Board 4: (Estonia) Gunnar Friedemann 10 / 13 = 76.9%
- Reserve: (Argentina) Isaías Pleci 9½ / 13 = 73.1%

=== Final B ===
#	Country	Players	Points
17	Iceland	Möller, Ásgeirsson, Guðmundsson, Thorvaldsson, Arnlaugsson	28
18	Canada	Morrison, Yanofsky, Opsahl, Holowach, Helman	28
19	Norway	Rojahn, Larsen, Rebnord, Austbø	27
20	Uruguay	Rotunno, Hounie Fleurquin, Gulla, Roux Cabral, Olivera	26
21	Bulgaria	Tsvetkov, Neikirch, Kiprov, Kantardzhiev, Karastoichev	25½
22	Ecuador	Ponce, Morales, Sierra, Suarez Dávila, Ayala	21
23	Guatemala	Vassaux, Asturias, Cruz Bulnes, Salazar	15½
24	Ireland	O'Hanlon, O'Donovan, Kerlin, Minnis, Nash	15½
25	Peru	Ismodes, Pinzón Solis, Castro de Mendoza, Soto, Cayo	14
26	Bolivia	Cordova, Baender, Rodríguez Hurtado, Zavala, Reyes Velasco	10
27	Paraguay	Díaz Pérez, Espínola, Laterza, Boettner, Aponte	9½

Prizes for best individual performances (based on results in the final only) went to:

- Board 1: (Norway) Ernst Rojahn
- Board 2: (Canada) Daniel Yanofsky
- Board 3: (Iceland) Jón Guðmundsson
- Board 4: (Bulgaria) Mikhail Kantardzhiev
- Reserve: (Iceland) Guðmundur Arnlaugsson

=== Team results ===
Group 1

Place	Country	1	2	3	4	5	6	7	+	−	=	Points
1—2	Poland	-	2	3	3½	2½	4	3½	5	0	1	18½
1—2	Bohemia and Moravia	2	-	2½	3½	3	4	3½	5	0	1	18½
3	England	1	1½	-	3	2½	2½	3	4	2	0	13½
4	Brazil	½	½	1	-	3	3½	4	3	3	0	12½
5	Canada	1½	1	1½	1	-	3½	2½	2	4	0	11
6	Peru	0	0	1½	½	½	-	2½	1	5	0	5
7	Paraguay	½	½	1	0	1½	1½	-	0	6	0	5

Group 2

Place	Country	1	2	3	4	5	6	7	+	−	=	Points
1	Latvia	-	1½	3½	2½	3	3	4	5	1	0	17½
2	Germany	2½	-	2½	2	3	2½	3½	5	0	1	16
3	Chile	½	1½	-	2½	3	3	3½	4	2	0	14
4	France	1½	2	1½	-	2	3	3½	2	2	2	13½
5	Bulgaria	1	1	1	2	-	3	2	1	3	2	10
6	Uruguay	1	1½	1	1	1	-	3	1	5	0	8½
7	Bolivia	0	½	½	½	2	1	-	0	5	1	4½

Group 3

Place	Country	1	2	3	4	5	6	7	+	−	=	Points
1	Argentina	-	2½	3	2½	2½	3½	4	6	0	0	18
2	Lithuania	1½	-	1½	3	2½	4	4	4	2	0	16½
3	Netherlands	1	2½	-	2	2½	3½	3½	4	1	1	15
4	Denmark	1½	1	2	-	2	4	3	2	2	2	13½
5	Iceland	1½	1½	1½	2	-	3½	3	2	3	1	13
6	Ireland	½	0	½	0	½	-	3	1	5	0	4½
7	Ecuador	0	0	½	1	1	1	-	0	6	0	3½

Group 4

Place	Country	1	2	3	4	5	6	+	−	=	Points
1	Sweden	-	1	2½	2½	4	4	4	1	0	14
2	Estonia	3	-	1½	2½	2	4	3	1	1	13
3	Palestine	1½	2½	-	1	3½	2½	3	2	0	11
4	Cuba	1½	1½	3	-	1	3	2	3	0	10
5	Norway	0	2	½	3	-	2½	2	2	1	8
6	Guatemala	0	0	1½	1	1½	-	0	5	0	4

Final A

Place	Country	1	2	3	4	5	6	7	8	9	10	11	12	13	14	15	+	−	=	Points
1	Germany	-	2	2½	3	3	3	3	2	2	2	3½	2	3	2½	2½	9	0	5	36
2	Poland	2	-	2½	1½	2½	2	2	1½	2	4	3½	2	4	2½	3½	7	2	5	35½
3	Estonia	1½	1½	-	2	1½	3	1½	2½	2	2	3	3	3½	3½	3	7	4	3	33½
4	Sweden	1	2½	2	-	3½	1½	1½	1½	2	3	3½	3	2½	1½	4	7	5	2	33
5	Argentina	1	1½	2½	½	-	3½	2½	1½	2	2½	2½	3½	3	3½	2½	9	4	1	32½
6	Bohemia and Moravia	1	2	1	2½	½	-	3½	3½	2½	2	3	2½	2	3½	2½	8	3	3	32
7	Latvia	1	2	2½	2½	1½	½	-	2	3	2½	2½	3½	3	2½	2½	9	3	2	31½
8	Netherlands	2	2½	1½	2½	2½	½	2	-	1½	2	2	3	2	2½	4	6	3	5	30½
9	Palestine	2	2	2	2	2	1½	1	2½	-	2½	3	1	1½	2½	½	4	5	5	26
10	France	2	0	2	1	1½	2	1½	2	1½	-	2	1	2	2	4	1	6	7	24½
11	Cuba	½	½	1	½	1½	1	1½	2	1	2	-	3	3	2½	2½	4	8	2	22½
12	Chile	2	2	1	1	½	1½	½	1	3	3	1	-	1½	2½	1½	3	9	2	22
13	Lithuania	1	0	½	1½	1	2	1	2	2½	2	1	2½	-	2	3	3	7	4	22
14	Brazil	1½	1½	½	2½	½	½	1½	1½	1½	2	1½	1½	2	-	2½	2	10	2	21
15	Denmark	1½	½	1	0	1½	1½	1½	0	3½	0	1½	2½	1	1½	-	2	12	0	17½

- Matches in italics in black have not been played.

Final B

Place	Country	1	2	3	4	5	6	7	8	9	10	11	+	−	=	Points
16	Iceland	-	2½	2	3	2½	3	3½	2½	2	4	3	8	0	2	28
17	Canada	1½	-	3	2	3	3	2	3½	3½	3½	3	7	1	2	28
18	Norway	2	1	-	2½	1½	3	4	2	3½	3½	4	6	2	2	27
19	Uruguay	1	2	1½	-	3	2	3½	3½	2½	3	4	6	2	2	26
20	Bulgaria	1½	1	2½	1	-	3	4	2½	3½	3½	3	7	3	0	25½
21	Ecuador	1	1	1	2	1	-	3	2½	3	3½	3	5	1	4	21
22	Guatemala	½	2	0	½	0	1	-	2½	3	3	3	4	5	1	15½
23	Ireland	1½	½	2	½	1½	1½	1½	-	1½	2½	2½	2	1	7	15½
24	Peru	2	½	½	1½	½	1	1	2½	-	2	2½	2	6	2	14
25	Bolivia	0	½	½	1	½	½	1	1½	2	-	2½	1	8	1	10
26	Paraguay	1	1	0	0	1	1	1	1½	1½	1½	-	0	10	0	9½
