= Henryk Friedman =

Polish chess player (1903–1942)

Henryk Friedman (Friedmann) (1903–1942) was a Polish chess master.

He lived in Lviv (Lwów, Lemberg). In 1926–1934, Friedman won seven times in succession the Championship of Lviv but 1930, when he took 2nd place behind Stepan Popel. Friedman played in four Polish championships. In 1926, he took 14th in Warsaw (1st POL-ch). The event was won by Dawid Przepiórka. In 1927, he took 13th in Łódź (2nd POL-ch). The event was won by Akiba Rubinstein. In 1935, he tied for 2nd-4th with Mieczysław Najdorf and Paulin Frydman, behind Ksawery Tartakower in Warsaw (3rd POL-ch). In 1936, he won in Vienna (19th Trebitsch-Turnier). In 1937, he took 12th in Jurata (4 th POL-ch). The event was won by Tartakower.

Henryk Friedman played for Poland at fourth board (+5 –2 =5) in the 6th Chess Olympiad at Warsaw 1935. He won team bronze medal there. He also played at fifth board (+11 –0 =9) in unofficial Olympiad at Munich 1936, where he won two silver medals (team and individual).

Henryk Friedman died probably in a German Nazi camp.

== See also ==
- List of Jewish chess players
