= Movsas Feigins =

Latvian chess player (1908–1950)

Movsas Feigins or Movša Feigin (28 February 1908 – 11 August 1950) was a Latvian chess master.

== Biography ==
Movsas Feigins was born in Dvinsk (then Russian Empire, now Daugavpils, Latvia). He won at Riga 1930, and was Latvian Champion in 1932 (after a play-off). In 1932, he tied for 3rd–5th at Riga. The event was won by Vladimirs Petrovs. In 1936/37, he tied for 4th–5th at Hastings. The event was won by Alexander Alekhine. In 1937, he tied for 15th–16th in the Kemeri 1937 chess tournament (Salo Flohr, Petrovs and Samuel Reshevsky won); took 2nd in Brussels (Quadrangular, Alberic O'Kelly de Galway won); took 3rd, behind Petrovs and Fricis Apšenieks, in Riga (7th LAT-ch, Triangular), and took 2nd in Riga (Quadrangular, Paul List won). In March 1939, he took 6th at Kemeri–Riga (Flohr won).

Feigins played for Latvia in five official Chess Olympiads. He also played at the 3rd unofficial Chess Olympiad at Munich 1936.

- In July 1930, he played at third board at 3rd Chess Olympiad in Hamburg (+6 –5 =6).
- In July 1931, he played at fourth board at 4th Chess Olympiad in Prague (+8 –5 =2).
- In July 1933, he played at third board at 5th Chess Olympiad in Folkestone (+6 –2 =6).
- In August 1935, he played at third board at 6th Chess Olympiad in Warsaw (+7 –5 =5).
- In August/September 1936, he played at third board at unofficial Olympiad in Munich (+12 –2 =5).
- In August/September 1939, he played at third board at 8th Olympiad in Buenos Aires (+10 –4 =5).

He won two individual medals: bronze in 1933 and silver in 1936.

In September 1939, when World War II broke out, Feigins, along with many other participants of the 8th Chess Olympiad decided to stay permanently in Argentina.

In March 1941, Feigins tied for 6th–8th in the Mar del Plata 1941 chess tournament (Gideon Ståhlberg won). He was 4th in Asunción 1944 and remained in Paraguay until 1946 when took 3rd at Buenos Aires (Círculo "La Regence"). He died in poverty in Buenos Aires.

== Notable games ==
- Einar Thorvaldsson (ISL) vs Movsas Feigins, Folkestone 1933, 5th Olympiad, King's Indian, E90, 0-1
- Movsas Feigins vs Endre Steiner (HUN), Munich (ol) 1936, Nimzo-Indian, Classical, E38, 1-0
- Milan Vidmar vs Movsas Feigins, Hastings 1936/37, Queen's Gambit Declined, Orthodox Defense, Classical, D68, 0-1
- Karlis Ozols vs Movsas Feigins, Kemeri 1937, English Opening, A13, 0–1
- Movsas Feigins vs László Szabó, Kemeri–Riga 1939, Grünfeld Defense, Russian Variation, D97, 1-0
- Movsas Feigins vs Markas Luckis (LTU), Buenos Aires 1939, 8th Olympiad, Nimzo-Indian, Classical, E33, 1-0
- Movsas Feigins vs Erich Eliskases, Mar del Plata 1941, Nimzo-Indian, Classical, E33, 1/2-1/2
