= Moshe Czerniak =

Polish-Israeli chess player (1910–1984)

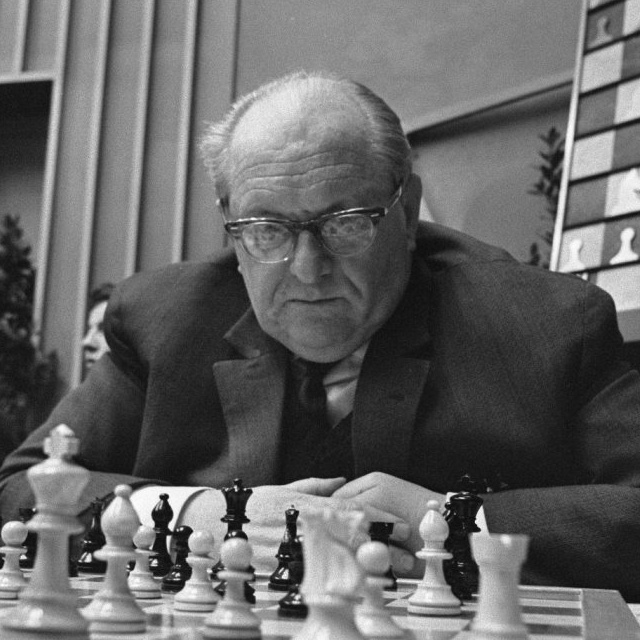
- Czerniak in 1966

Personal information
- Native name: משה צ'רניאק
- Born: February 3, 1910 Warsaw, Poland
- Died: August 31, 1984 (aged 74) Tel Aviv, Israel

Chess career
- Country: Poland; Israel
- Title: International Master (1952)

Moshe Czerniak (born Moizes Czerniak, also knowns as Miguel Czerniak; Hebrew: משה צ'רניאק; 3 February 1910 – 31 August 1984) was a Polish-Israeli chess player. He was awarded the title of International Master (IM) by FIDE in 1952.

== Biography ==
In 1930 Moshe Czerniak took ninth at Warsaw in an event won by Paulino Frydman. In 1934 Czerniak emigrated from Poland to Israel (then the British Mandate). In April 1935, he tied for 7th–8th in Tel Aviv (the 2nd Maccabiah Games, Abram Blass won). He was Israeli Chess Championship in 1936 and 1938. In April 1939, he played in the First Lasker Chess Club Championship in Tel Aviv. In June 1939, he became the champion of Jerusalem. Czerniak played for his adopted country at first reserve board in the 6th Chess Olympiad at Warsaw 1935 (+6 =2 −5), and at first board in the 8th Olympiad at Buenos Aires 1939 (+4 =2 −10).

In September 1939, when World War II broke out, Czerniak, along with many other participants in the 8th Chess Olympiad, decided to stay in Argentina.

Immediately after the 8th Olympiad, in October 1939, he tied for 3rd–4th with Gideon Ståhlberg, behind Miguel Najdorf and Paul Keres in the Buenos Aires 1939 chess tournament (Circulo). In 1940, he tied for 7–9th in Argentine championships (Torneo Mayor). In 1941, he won in Quilmes. In 1941, he took 2nd, behind Paulino Frydman in Buenos Aires, and tied for 6th–8th in the Mar del Plata 1941 chess tournament. In 1943, he took 2nd, behind Najdorf, in Rosario, and took 3rd in Buenos Aires. In 1944 and in 1948, he won in Buenos Aires. In 1949, he took 4th in Mar del Plata, and tied for 3rd–4th in Argentine championships (Torneo Mayor). In 1950, he tied for 9th–11th in Mar del Plata.

In 1950 Czerniak settled in Israel. In 1951, he won at Vienna (the 4th Schlechter Memorial). In 1951, he won at Reggio Emilia. In 1955, he won the Israeli Championship. In 1958, he took 2nd, behind Jan Hein Donner, at Beverwijk. In 1961, he tied for 1st–3rd with Milan Matulović and Petar Trifunović at Netanya. In 1962, he tied for 1st–2nd with Hiong Liong Tan at Amsterdam (2nd IBM Tournament). In 1963, he tied for 2nd–3rd with Donner, behind Lajos Portisch, at Amsterdam (3rd IBM). In 1963, he took 2nd, behind Nikola Padevsky, at Polanica Zdrój (Rubinstein Memorial). In 1964, he tied for 4th–9th at Polanica Zdrój. In 1965, he won at Netanya. In 1966, he tied for 7th–8th at Tel Aviv. In 1968, he tied for 2nd–3rd with Daniel Yanofsky, behind Robert Fischer, at Netanya.

Czerniak played for Israel in nine Chess Olympiads: 1952, 1954, 1956, 1958, 1960, 1962, 1966, 1968, and 1974. He won the team championship of Israel in 1974 at the age of 64.

Czerniak was awarded the International Master title in 1952.

He wrote many chess books in three languages. In 1956 he founded the first Israeli chess magazine, 64 Squares. For more than thirty years he was the chess editor of the Israeli daily Haaretz. He was also the chess teacher of IM and Grandmaster of chess composition, Yochanan Afek.

In 1976 he got a special award from the Israeli education ministry for his lifelong contribution to the education of chess.

The yearly chess festival in Tel Aviv is named after him. Furthermore, a variation in the Sicilian Defense, Dragon Variation is named after him.

== See also ==
- List of Jewish chess players
