= Miguel Najdorf =

Polish-Argentine chess grandmaster (1910–1997)

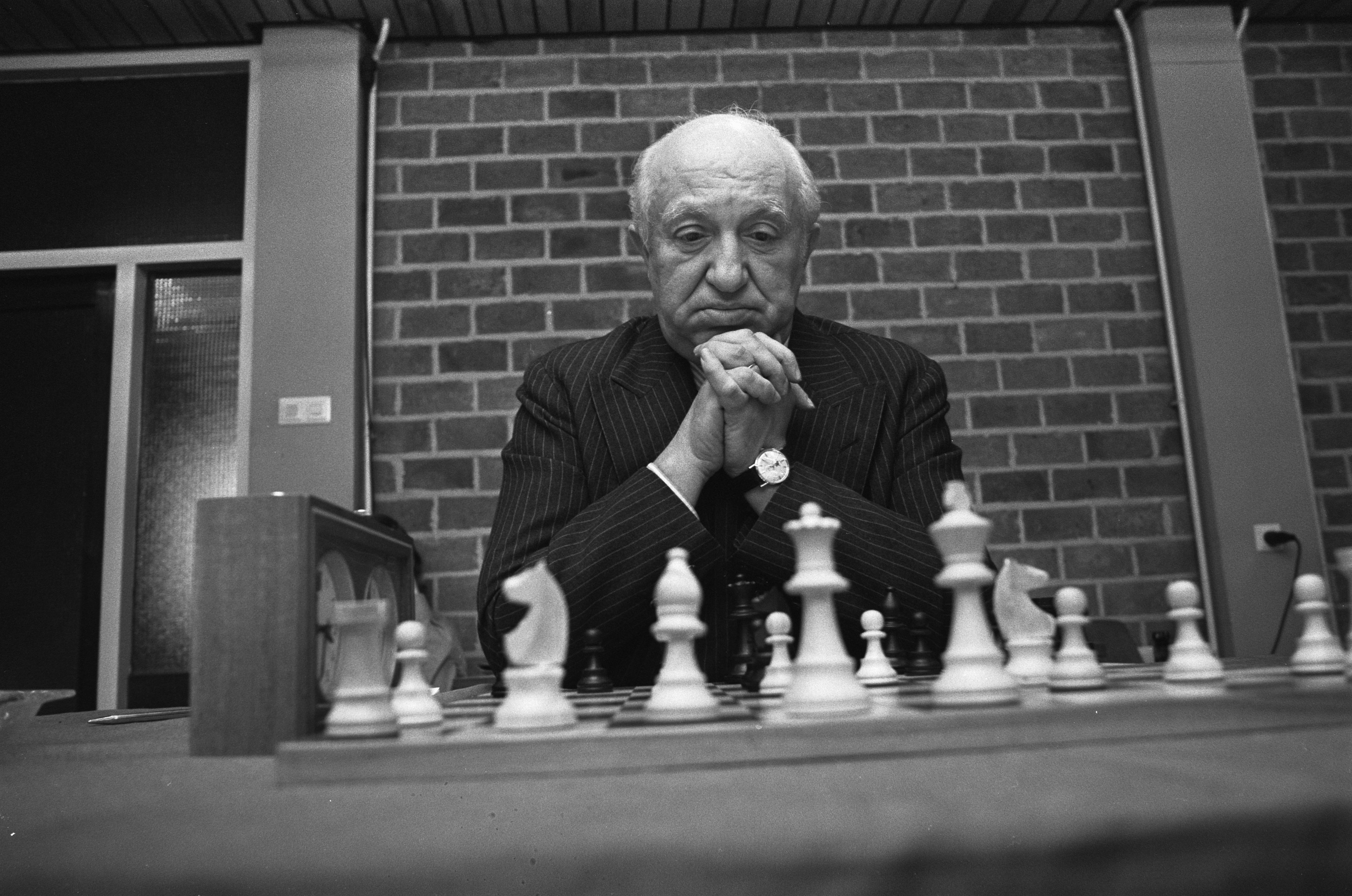
- Miguel Najdorf in 1973

Personal information
- Born: Mojsze Mendel Najdorf; 15 April 1910 Grodzisk Mazowiecki, Poland, Russian Empire
- Died: 4 July 1997 (aged 87) Málaga, Spain

Chess career
- Country: Poland (before 1940); Argentina (after 1940)
- Title: Grandmaster (1950)
- Peak rating: 2540 (July 1972)
- Peak ranking: No. 42 (July 1972)

Miguel Najdorf (/naɪdɔːrf/ NY-dorf; born Mojsze Mendel Najdorf; (Note: Official Polish name: Mojsze Mendel Najdorf. Public Polish name: Mieczysław Najdorf. Official Argentine name: Moisés Mendel Najdorf. Public Argentine name: Miguel Najdorf.) 15 April 1910 – 4 July 1997) was a Polish-Argentine chess grandmaster. Originally from Poland, he was in Argentina when World War II began in 1939, and he stayed and settled there. He was a leading world player in the 1940s and 1950s, and is also known for the Najdorf Variation, one of the most popular chess openings.

== Early life in Poland ==
Najdorf was tutored first by Dawid Przepiórka, then by Savielly Tartakower, the latter of whom he always referred to as "my teacher".

At the beginning of his chess career, around 1930, Najdorf defeated a player believed to be named "Glücksberg" in a famous game often referred to as "The Polish Immortal". In 1930, he tied for 6th–7th at the Warsaw Championship, an event won by Paulino Frydman. In 1931, he took second in Warsaw, behind Frydman. In 1932, he tied for 9th–10th in Warsaw. In 1933, he won in Warsaw (Quadrangular). In January 1934, he finished second to Rudolf Spielmann, in Warsaw. In summer 1934, he lost a match against Ored Karlin (+1–2=1). In 1934, he won the Warsaw championship. In 1935, he tied for 2nd–4th with Frydman and Henryk Friedman, behind Tartakower, in the 3rd Polish Chess Championship, held in Warsaw. Afterward, Najdorf won a match against Tartakower in Toruń (+2–1=2). In 1936, he tied for first with Lajos Steiner in the Hungarian Championship. In 1937, he took third at the 4th Championship of Poland in Jurata. In 1937, he won in Rogaška Slatina (Rohitsch-Sauerbrunn). In 1938, he tied for 10th–12th in Łódź. In 1939, he took sixth in Margate, and won in Warsaw.

Najdorf represented Poland in four pre-war Chess Olympiads. In August 1935, he played third board in the 6th Chess Olympiad in Warsaw (+9–2=6). In August 1936, he was second board in 3rd unofficial Chess Olympiad organised by the German Chess Federation in Munich (+14–2=4). In June/July 1937, he played at second board in the 7th Chess Olympiad in Stockholm (+5–3=7). In the 1939 Olympiad, Najdorf played second board for Poland and achieved a score of +12−2=4, winning a gold pen and pencil set.

== Move to Argentina ==
During the 8th Chess Olympiad in Buenos Aires in August/September 1939, World War II broke out. Najdorf was Jewish, as were two of his teammates, Tartakower and Frydman. He decided to stay and settle in Argentina (as did many others). He became an Argentine citizen in 1944.

His wife, daughter, parents and four siblings all were murdered in The Holocaust. Najdorf later remarried (twice) and had two daughters.

=== Blindfold chess ===
Najdorf set world records for simultaneous blindfold chess. He played a record 40 opponents in 1943, and increased the record to 45 in 1947. This record stood until 2011.

He set these records in the hope that the news would be reported in Europe and his family would learn of his whereabouts, but they had perished in concentration camps by the time the information arrived.

== Career in Argentina ==
=== 1940s ===
In September 1939, after the Olympiad, Najdorf emerged as one of the top players in the chess world. He tied for first with Paul Keres at Buenos Aires (Círculo de Ajedrez); the two scored 8½/11. In 1941, he took second, after Gideon Ståhlberg at Mar del Plata, with 12½/17. Later in 1941, he finished equal first with Ståhlberg at Buenos Aires, the two scoring 11/14. In 1942, he won at Mar del Plata, with 13½/17, ahead of Ståhlberg. In 1943, he was second at Mar del Plata, behind Stålhberg, scoring 10/13. In 1943, he won at Rosario. In 1944, he won at La Plata, with 13/16, ahead of Ståhlberg. In 1944, he tied for first with Hermann Pilnik at Mar del Plata, with each scoring 12/15. In 1945, he won at Buenos Aires (Roberto Grau Memorial), with 10/12, ahead of Ståhlberg and Carlos Guimard. He took second place at Viña del Mar 1945, with 10½/13, behind Guimard, then won Mar del Plata 1945 with 11/15, ahead of Ståhlberg, and repeated at Mar del Plata 1946 with 16/18, ahead of Guimard and Ståhlberg. He also won at Rio de Janeiro 1946.

After World War II ended, organized chess resumed in the international arena, particularly in war-stricken Europe. In 1946, Najdorf tied for 4th–5th with László Szabó at Groningen, with 11½/19; the event was won by Mikhail Botvinnik. He then won at Prague, with (+9−1=3), ahead of Petar Trifunović, Gösta Stoltz, Svetozar Gligorić, and Jan Foltys. He also won at Barcelona 1946, with 11½/13, ahead of Daniel Yanofsky. In 1947, he took second place at Buenos Aires/La Plata (Sextangular), with 6½/10, behind Ståhlberg, but ahead of Max Euwe. In 1947, he won at Mar del Plata. In 1947, he finished second, after Erich Eliskases, at São Paulo.

In 1948, Najdorf placed second at New York City with 6/9, two points behind Reuben Fine. He tied for 4th–5th with Héctor Rossetto at Mar del Plata, with 10/17, behind Eliskases, Ståhlberg, and Medina Garcia. Najdorf won at Mar del Plata 1948 with 14/17, ahead of Ståhlberg (13½), Eliskases (12), and Euwe (10½). He was second at Buenos Aires 1948, with 8/10, behind Ståhlberg. Najdorf won at Venice 1948, with 11½/13, ahead of Gedeon Barcza, Esteban Canal, and Euwe. In 1949, he tied for first with Ståhlberg at Buenos Aires. In 1950, he won at Amsterdam, with 15/19, ahead of Samuel Reshevsky (14), Ståhlberg (13½), Gligorić (12), Vasja Pirc (12), and Euwe (11½). He also won at Bled in 1950.

=== World Championship contender ===
Although not a full-time chess professional (for many years he worked in the insurance business, selling life insurance), Najdorf was one of the world's leading chess players in the 1940s and 1950s.

Najdorf's string of successes from 1939 to 1947 had raised him into the ranks of the world's top players. According to Chessmetrics, he was ranked second in the world from mid 1947 to mid 1949. Based on his results, there was talk of inviting him to the 1948 World Championship tournament, but in the end he was not invited. He had won an ostensible qualifying tournament at Prague by a margin of 1½ points. There was a view in some quarters that Prague had been a rather weak tournament, so Najdorf's accomplishment was downplayed. Najdorf stated in a 1947 interview:

I believe that I am inferior to none of the players who are to participate in the next world championship, Botvinnik, Fine, Reshevsky, Keres, Euwe. ... None of these have a better record than I. I have played much less than they have, admittedly, but I am satisfied with my results.

Pressure from the Soviet Chess Federation, perhaps pushed by Botvinnik, may have been responsible for keeping Najdorf out.

In 1950, FIDE made him one of the inaugural International Grandmasters. In the same year he played at Budapest in the Candidates Tournament to select a challenger for the World Chess Championship 1951, and finished fifth. Three years later, in the 1953 Candidates Tournament, he finished equal sixth. He never succeeded in qualifying for the Candidates again. He did come close in the next cycle, narrowly failing to qualify from the 1955 Interzonal, held at Gothenburg, Sweden.

=== Later career ===
Najdorf won important tournaments such as Mar del Plata (1961) and Havana (1962). He also played in both Piatigorsky Cup tournaments, held in 1963 and 1966. Just before his 60th birthday, he participated in the 1970 USSR vs. Rest of the World match, achieving an even score against the former world champion Mikhail Tal.

Najdorf's lively personality made him a great favorite among chess fans, as he displayed an aptitude for witty sayings, in the manner of his mentor Tartakower. An example: commenting on his opponent at the 1970 USSR vs. Rest of the World match, he remarked, "When [then-World Champion Boris] Spassky offers you a piece, you might as well resign then and there. But when Tal offers you a piece, you would do well to keep playing, because then he might offer you another, and then another, and then ... who knows?"

Najdorf remained active in chess to the end of his life. He won the South African Open in 1976 and at age 69, he tied for second place in a very strong field at Buenos Aires 1979, with 8/13, behind winner Bent Larsen (11/13), though ahead of former world champions Tigran Petrosian and Boris Spassky. At Buenos Aires 1988, he made a score of 8½/15 for fourth place at age 78. The next year in the 1989 Argentine Chess Championship, with several other GMs in the field, he tied for 4th–6th places, with 10/17. His last national championship was in 1991 at age 81, where he finished with a minus score. Najdorf was an exceptional blitz (five-minute) player, remaining a strong player into his 80s.

Najdorf regarded Capablanca and Fischer as the greatest players of all time.

=== Olympiad performances ===
Najdorf played eleven times for Argentina in Chess Olympiads from 1950 to 1976. He played first board in the 9th Chess Olympiad at Dubrovnik 1950 (+8–0=6), as well as at Helsinki 1952 (+11–2=3), Amsterdam 1954, Moscow 1956, Leipzig 1960, Varna 1962, Havana 1966, Lugano 1968, Siegen 1970, and Haifa 1976. Only during the Olympiad at Nice 1974, he played on third board.

Najdorf took eleven Olympic medals: seven for teams Poland and Argentina (four silver, three bronze), and four individuals (gold in 1939, 1950 and 1952, as well as one silver in 1962).

== Contributions ==
Position: a8 black rook, b8 black knight, c8 black bishop, d8 black queen, e8 black king, f8 black bishop, h8 black rook, b7 black pawn, e7 black pawn, f7 black pawn, g7 black pawn, h7 black pawn, a6 black pawn, d6 black pawn, f6 black knight, d4 white knight, e4 white pawn, c3 white knight, a2 white pawn, b2 white pawn, c2 white pawn, f2 white pawn, g2 white pawn, h2 white pawn, a1 white rook, c1 white bishop, d1 white queen, e1 white king, f1 white bishop, h1 white rook

The Najdorf Variation of the Sicilian Defense begins with the moves: 1.e4 c5 2.Nf3 d6 3.d4 cxd4 4.Nxd4 Nf6 5.Nc3 a6.

The Najdorf Variation in the Sicilian Defense, one of the most popular openings in modern chess, is named after him. Najdorf also made contributions to the theory and praxis of other openings such as the King's Indian Defense. Najdorf was also a well-respected chess journalist, who had a popular column in the Buenos Aires Clarín newspaper.

== Notable games ==
- Glucksberg vs Miguel Najdorf, Warsaw 1929, Dutch Defence (A85), 0–1 "The Polish Immortal" or "Najdorf's Immortal" – one of the most brilliant games of the twentieth century.
- Miguel Najdorf vs Gideon Stahlberg, Lodz 1938, Queen's Gambit Declined, Semi-Tarrasch Defence (D40), 1–0 These two players settled in Argentina in 1939, where they had great battles in many events.
- Miguel Najdorf vs Paul Keres, Buenos Aires Circulo 1939, Queen's Gambit Declined, Slav Defence (D11), 1–0 Keres opens the centre prematurely, and Najdorf forms a pawn roller and arranges a quick victory.
- Carlos Guimard vs Miguel Najdorf, Buenos Aires Circulo 1941, Queen's Gambit Declined, Slav Defence (D11), 0–1 Najdorf shows how to play this line from the Black side, by comparison with the Keres game given above.
- Miguel Najdorf vs Mikhail Botvinnik, Groningen 1946, Nimzo–Indian Defence, Classical Variation (E35), 1–0 In their first meeting, Najdorf catches the future World Champion in a maze of tactics.
- Miguel Najdorf vs Isaac Boleslavsky, Groningen 1946, Old Indian Defence (A54), 1–0 Najdorf avoids a tactical battle with an early exchange of queens in Boleslavsky's pet variation, then grinds him down.
- Miguel Najdorf vs Erich Eliskases, Mar del Plata 1947, Queen's Gambit Declined, Orthodox Defence (D63), 1–0 Eliskases was another European GM who stayed in South America during World War II, and he also had a great rivalry with Najdorf.
- Miguel Najdorf vs Reuben Fine, New York 1951, Queen's Gambit Accepted (D28), 1–0 Fine was getting ready to retire from chess, with this being his last serious event at age 37.
- Mark Taimanov vs Miguel Najdorf, Zurich 1953, King's Indian, Orthodox, Aronin–Taimanov, 9.Ne1 (E98), 0–1 A brilliancy-prize game from the 1953 Candidates event versus the Soviet grandmaster Mark Taimanov. Najdorf's enthusiasm for, and virtuosity in conducting, the attack against the enemy king is well shown here, in a game praised by David Bronstein in his famous book on the tournament. It is also a good example of learning from one's defeats. Earlier that year, Gligorić had beaten Najdorf with the same system. (Miguel Najdorf vs Svetozar Gligoric, Mar del Plata 1953). After the game, Don Miguel delivered his famous line: "Taimanov had better go and play his piano!"
- Miguel Najdorf once played a game of chess with communist revolutionary Che Guevara; they drew.

== Personal life ==
According to a biography by his younger daughter Liliana (b. 1952), Mojsze Mendel ("Mikel") Najdorf was the oldest of five children (four sons and one daughter) of Jewish parents, Gdalik (Gedali) and Raisa (Rojza) Najdorf (née Rojza Rosklein). When he was 14, he visited his school friend Ruben Fridelbaum's house, and his violinist father taught him chess. Mikel was immediately hooked, read books about the game, and was soon able to give his teacher rook odds.

A musician friend introduced his fiancée Genia to Najdorf, but Najdorf and Genia fell in love, and Genia broke off her engagement and instead married Mikel. They had one daughter, Lusia. When Najdorf boarded the ship for the Buenos Aires Olympiad in 1939, Genia was ill with influenza, and chose not to accompany him. He arrived in Argentina on 21 August 1939. While the Olympiad was in progress, Najdorf's country was invaded and World War II began. Despite his best efforts, he never saw his family again. His parents, wife and baby daughter, and all his known relatives and friends, were murdered in The Holocaust. However, many years later, by chance he met a Polish immigrant in the New York City Subway, who turned out to be a cousin.

In 1944, Najdorf became a naturalized citizen of Argentina. He had studied Latin at college, so easily picked up Spanish. Najdorf spoke eight languages; in addition to his native Polish and adopted Spanish, he spoke English, Russian, Czech, Serbo-Croat, Dutch, and Yiddish.

In April 1947, Najdorf met Adela ("Eta"), one of the youngest of three daughters of Russian Jewish immigrants Isaac and Esther Jusid. They were married after only a few weeks of courtship. Adela was 11 years younger than Najdorf. They had two daughters, Mirta (b. 1948) and Liliana (b. 1952), and a miscarried son in between. Liliana was long resentful of the fact that her father was abroad when she was born, and did not see her until she was four months old. She describes her father as a mixture of extremes: violent-tempered, but compassionate and loving, selfish at times but also generous to a fault, jovial and a bon vivant, but also sad because of the terrible losses of the Holocaust.

Adela died on 21 August 1977, of an inoperable intestinal tumour. The family kept the diagnosis secret from her, while Najdorf consulted the best oncologists in the US to no avail.

Not long after Adela died, Najdorf married again, to Rita, who had been a widow for 12 years. Najdorf had met Rita and her husband Jacobo, a socialist attorney and keen chess player, soon after he arrived in Argentina. They became close family friends. Rita and Jacobo had no children of their own, but had many nieces and nephews, and they treated the Najdorf daughters like nieces. The families would often get together, and the men would play and analyse chess and the women would talk. At one such gathering, when Liliana was 13, she saw Jacobo die suddenly at a chessboard. The widowed Rita became an even closer friend to Adela. After Adela died, Rita and Najdorf became a couple, which Miguel's daughters accepted without surprise and with relief.

Rita later developed Alzheimer's disease, and Najdorf became physically frailer. In 1996, Najdorf had a serious heart attack in Seville, which required a pacemaker insert. Upon returning to Argentina, he learned that Rita had been hospitalized with an intestinal blockage. He went to the hospital, and she recognized him despite her Alzheimer's, and begged him to take her home, while he kissed her tenderly. Unexpectedly, she died the next day.

== See also ==
- List of Jewish chess players
