= Erich Eliskases =

Austrian-Argentine chess grandmaster (1913–1997)

Personal information
- Born: Erich Gottlieb Eliskases; 15 February 1913 Innsbruck, Austro-Hungarian Empire
- Died: 2 February 1997 (aged 83) Córdoba, Argentina

Chess career
- Country: Austria (before 1938); Germany (1938–1939); Brazil (1941–1951); Argentina (after 1951)
- Title: Grandmaster (1952)
- Peak rating: 2430 (January 1977)

Erich Gottlieb Eliskases (15 February 1913 – 2 February 1997) was a chess player who represented Austria, Germany, Brazil and Argentina in international competition. In the late 1930s he was considered a potential contender for the World Championship. Eliskases was granted the title of Grandmaster by FIDE in 1952.

== Chess career ==
Born in Innsbruck, Austro-Hungarian Empire, he learned chess at the age of twelve and quickly displayed an aptitude for the game, winning the Schlechter chess club championship in his first year at the club, aged just fourteen. At fifteen, he was the Tyrolean Champion and at sixteen, joint winner of the Austrian Championship.

His college education in Innsbruck and Vienna centred on business studies; it was chess, though, that captured his imagination and he had exceptional results representing Austria at the Olympiads of 1930, 1933 and 1935. After the Anschluss of March 1938, he won the German national championship at Bad Oeynhausen in 1938 and 1939. Other early successes included outright or joint first place at Budapest 1934 (the Hungarian Championship), Linz 1934, Zürich 1935, Milan 1937; and match wins against Rudolf Spielmann (in 1932, 1936 and 1937). He acted as a second to Alexander Alekhine during Alekhine's successful world championship rematch against Max Euwe in 1937.

His best two years were 1938 and 1939. In June 1938 he won a tournament in Noordwijk ahead of Paul Keres (who later that year would win the great AVRO 1938 chess tournament) and previous world champion Max Euwe. His victory in Noordwijk was his best career result, and began a streak of eight consecutive tournaments in which he was undefeated: six in 1938 and 1939, including Krefeld 1938, Bad Harzburg 1939, Bad Elster 1939, Vienna 1939; and two later in South America. He also won a match against previous world championship challenger Efim Bogoljubov in 1939.

These successes led to suggestions of a World Championship match with Alekhine. Documentary evidence later showed that the Nazi regime had scheduled him a 1941 match with the World Champion, but had subsequently abandoned the idea. In 1941, Alekhine spoke out in favour of a match with either Eliskases or Keres, preferring the former. But Dutch grandmaster Hans Ree argues that it does not mean Eliskases was the strongest contender: it was one of a series of antisemitic articles attributed to Alekhine, and the suggestion of a German contender was probably politically motivated.

In 1939, Eliskases emigrated to South America. He played under the German flag at the 1939 Buenos Aires Olympiad, during which World War II began, when Eliskases (along with many other players) decided to stay in Argentina (and for a while in Brazil) rather than return to Europe. During those years he struggled to make a living; and in Brazil he was threatened with internment and expulsion, though some Brazilian chess enthusiasts helped Eliskases avoid that fate by hiring him as a chess teacher.

In 1951 he returned to Argentina, where he eventually became a naturalized Argentine citizen and represented his new country at the Olympiads of 1952, 1958, 1960 and 1964. Thus he represented three different countries at Olympiads: Austria, Germany and Argentina, possibly the only person to do so. Tournament success in South America included first or joint first at Águas de São Pedro/São Paulo 1941, São Paulo 1947, Mar del Plata 1948, Punta del Este 1951 and Córdoba 1959.

FIDE awarded Eliskases the titles of International Master and Grandmaster in 1950 and 1952, respectively.

He carried on playing through the 1950s, 1960s and even into the 1970s, but his results were less convincing. He married the Argentinian María Esther Almeda in 1954 and had a son, Carlos Enrico. In 1976, he and his wife went back to the Austrian Tyrol, but the couple failed to settle and returned to Córdoba in Argentina.

Eliskases was also a strong correspondence player and his notes showed that he scored over 75 percent during his most active period.

He was considered an expert in the endgame—at Semmering 1937, he outplayed and beat Capablanca in this phase, despite this being the forte of the Cuban ex-world champion. Hans Ree observes that Eliskases is one of only four players (along with Keres, Reshevsky and Euwe) to beat both Capablanca and Bobby Fischer. He had even scores against Euwe (3–3), Capablanca (2–2) and Fischer (1–1).

== Notable games ==
- This was the first of Eliskases' three wins (in seven games) against Euwe, who became world champion the same year.
  Max Euwe vs. Eliskases, 1935; Queen's Gambit Declined
  1.d4 Nf6 2.c4 e6 3.Nc3 d5 4.Bg5 Be7 (Orthodox Defence) 5.e3 0-0 6.Nf3 h6 7.Bh4 Ne4 8.Bxe7 Qxe7 9.cxd5 Nxc3 10.bxc3 exd5 11.Qb3 Qd6 12.c4 dxc4 13.Bxc4 Nc6 14.Qc3 Bg4 15.0-0 Bxf3 16.gxf3 Kh8 (Three years later at Noordwijk, Eliskases played 16...Rad8 against Euwe, beating him in 50 moves.) 17.Rab1 b6 18.Rfc1 Ne7 19.Ba6 c6 20.Qb4 Qf6 21.f4 g5 22.fxg5 Rg8 23.h4 hxg5 24.h5 g4 25.d5 g3 26.Qd4 gxf2+ 27.Kf1 Rg1+ 28.Ke2 Qxd4 29.exd4 Nxd5 30.Kxf2 Rg4 31.Rxc6 Rf4+ 32.Ke2 Rxd4 33.Rb2 Re8+ 34.Kf1 Ne3+ 35.Ke1 Nc2+ 36.Kf1 Rf4+ 37.Kg2 Rg8+ 38.Kh3 Nb4 39.Rxb4 Rxb4 40.Rc7 Rg5 41.Rxf7 Rxh5+ 42.Kg3 Ra5 0–1
- Eliskases vs. José Raúl Capablanca, Semmering 1937; Slav Defence
  1.d4 d5 2.c4 c6 3.Nf3 Nf6 4.Nc3 dxc4 5.a4 Bf5 6.Ne5 (Krause Attack) Nbd7 7.Nxc4 Qc7 8.g3 e5 9.dxe5 Nxe5 10.Bf4 Nfd7 11.Bg2 f6 12.0-0 Rd8 13.Qc1 Be6 14.Nxe5 Nxe5 15.a5 a6 16.Ne4 Bb4 17.Bd2 Qe7 18.Bxb4 Qxb4 19.Qc5 Qxc5 20.Nxc5 Bc8 21.Rfd1 Ke7 22.b3 Nf7 23.e4 Rd6 24.Rxd6 Kxd6 25.b4 Kc7 26.Rd1 Rd8 27.Rxd8 Nxd8 28.f4 b6 29.axb6+ Kxb6 30.Bf1 Ne6 31.Na4+ Kc7 32.Kf2 g5 33.Ke3 gxf4+ 34.gxf4 Ng7 35.Nc5 Ne6 36.Nxe6+ Bxe6 37.Kd4 Kb6 38.Bc4 Bg4 39.e5 fxe5+ 40.fxe5 h6 41.h4 Bh5 42.e6 Be8 43.Bd3 Kc7 44.Kc5 Bh5 45.Bh7 Bg4 46.e7 Kd7 47.Be4 Kxe7 48.Bxc6 Be2 49.Bb7 Kd7 50.Kb6 Kd6 51.Bxa6 Bf3 52.Ka5 Bc6 53.Bb5 Bf3 54.Bd3 Bc6 55.Bc2 Kc7 56.Ba4 Bf3 57.b5 Kb7 58.b6 Be2 59.Bc2 Bf3 60.Bd3 Bg2 61.Ba6+ Kc6 62.Bc8 Bf1 63.Bg4 Bd3 64.Bf3+ Kd6 65.Bb7 Be2 66.Ba6 Bf3 67.Bf1 Bb7 68.Bh3 Ke7 69.Kb5 Kd6 70.Bf5 Ke7 71.Kc5 Bg2 72.Bc8 Kd8 73.Ba6 Bf3 74.Kd6 Bg2 75.Bc4 Kc8 76.Bd5 Bf1 77.Ke6 Be2 78.Kf6 Kd7 79.Kg6 h5 80.Kg5 Kd6 81.Bf7 Kc6 82.Bxh5 1–0
- Eliskases vs. Bobby Fischer, Buenos Aires 1960; Queen's Gambit Declined
  1.c4 Nf6 2.Nc3 e6 3.Nf3 d5 4.d4 Bb4 (Ragozin Variation) 5.Qb3 Nc6 6.Bg5 h6 7.Bxf6 Qxf6 8.e3 dxc4 9.Bxc4 0-0 10.0-0 Qe7 11.Qc2 Bd6 12.Rad1 Kh8 13.a3 e5 14.Nd5 Qe8 15.dxe5 Nxe5 16.Nxe5 Qxe5 17.f4 Qe8 18.e4 c6 19.Nc3 Bc7 20.Qe2 Be6 21.e5 Qe7 22.Ne4 Rad8 23.Kh1 Rfe8 24.Bxe6 Qxe6 25.Nc5 Qc8 26.Qh5 Rxd1 27.Rxd1 Rd8 28.h3 Kg8 29.Rxd8+ Qxd8 30.e6 Qe7 31.Qf5 b6 32.exf7 Qxf7 33.Qc8+ Kh7 34.Ne6 Bd6 35.g4 Qf6 36.Qd7 Qe7 37.Qxe7 Bxe7 38.Nd4 c5 39.Nc6 Bd6 40.Nxa7 c4 41.Nc8 Bc5 42.a4 Kg6 43.Kg2 Kf6 44.Kf3 Ke6 45.Ke4 Bf2 46.f5+ Kd7 47.Na7 Kd6 48.Nb5+ Kc5 49.Nc7 Bh4 50.Ne8 Kb4 51.Kd5 Be7 52.Nxg7 Bf6 53.Ne8 Bxb2 54.f6 Bxf6 55.Nxf6 c3 56.Nh5 Kxa4 57.Nf4 b5 58.Ne2 1–0
