= Francisco Benkö =

German-Argentine chess player (1910–2010)

Personal information
- Born: Franz Benkö; June 24, 1910 Berlin, German Empire
- Died: January 11, 2010 (aged 99) Buenos Aires, Argentina

Chess career
- Country: Germany, Argentina
- Years active: 1930s–2004

Francisco (Franz) Benkö (Benkő, Benko) (24 June 1910 – 11 January 2010) was a German–Argentine chess master and problemist.

He was born in Berlin into a Jewish family. His father, Richard Wilhelm Benkö, came from Hungary, and his mother, Alice Josephine Helene Pick, from Austria. In 1928 and 1929, he drew simultaneous games with Alexander Alekhine in Berlin. In 1935, Franz Benkö was the first Jewish chess master in Berlin. In spring 1936, he emigrated from Germany via Holland to Argentina, because of Nazi policy.

Francisco Benkö has played many times in Argentine Chess Championship, from 1937 to 2004 (aged 94). Among others, he took 11th in Torneo Mayor 1937 (Jacobo Bolbochán won), took 20th in 1938 (Roberto Grau won), took 11th in 1939 (Juan Traian Iliesco won), took 12th in 1940 (Carlos Guimard won), tied for 9–10th in 1941 (Markas Luckis won), took 13th in 1945 (Herman Pilnik won), shared 5th in 1947 (Héctor Rossetto won), took 5th in 1948 (Julio Bolbochán won), tied for 5–6th in 1949, and tied for 5–7th in 1953. At last, he has taken part in the 2004 Argentine Championship, finishing 91st.

In other tournaments, he tied for 9–10th at Buenos Aires 1939 (Círculo de Ajedrez, Miguel Najdorf and Paul Keres won), took 13th at Buenos Aires 1941 (Najdorf won), took 8th at Buenos Aires 1945 (Círculo de Ajedrez, Najdorf won), took 6th at Remedios de Escalada 1949 (Julio Bolbochán won), tied for 15-16th at Mar del Plata chess tournament 1949 (Rossetto won), and tied for 14-15th at Mar del Plata / Buenos Aires 1954 (the 2nd Torneio Zonal Sulamericano, Oscar Panno won).

== Chess composition and friends ==
Benkö was the longest living member of the Schwalbe, joining in 1928, and honorary member from 2009 until his death on 11 January 2010 in Buenos Aires. He built a collection of 30,000 compositions. When Benkö lived in Germany, he was acquainted with a few famous composers, including Ado Kraemer, Erich Zepler and Eduard Birgfeld. He also was a friend of Wolfgang Heidenfeld. Benkö knew some players in Berlin, too, but only managed to win against Friedrich Sämisch and Jacques Mieses while losing against Carl Ahues, Kurt Richter and Willi Schlage. In Buenos Aires 1939 Benkö met Alexander Alekhine, who solved some of Benkö's problems. In 1992 Benkö met Mikhail Tal who also tried to solve a chess problem (see below) but failed twice, still solving it afterwards. Upon the original publication of the problem, more than 500 people tried to solve it with half of them guessing incorrectly.

Francisco Benkö
British Chess Magazine, 1950

Position: b8 black queen, h8 black king, f7 white pawn, h7 black pawn, c6 black pawn, d6 white knight, h6 white pawn, c5 white pawn, b3 black pawn, b2 white king, a1 white bishop

Mate in 3
