= Juan Iliesco =

Romanian-Argentine chess player (1898–1968)

Juan Traian Iliesco (born Ion Traian Iliescu) (18 April 1898 in Brăila, Romania – 2 February 1968 in La Plata) was a Romanian Argentine chess master.

He played several times in Argentine championships (Torneo Mayor). In 1931, he took 12th place (Jacobo Bolbochán won); took 4th in 1932 (Isaías Pleci won); took 2nd, behind Luis Piazzini, in 1933; tied for 5-7th in 1934 (Roberto Grau won); took 5th in 1935 (Jacobo Bolbochán won); took 11th in 1936 (Carlos Guimard won); took 10th in 1937 (Jacobo Bolbochán won); tied for 7-8th in 1938 (Grau won).

Iliesco finished 1st in Argentine championship in 1939, but he could not win the title as a foreigner (Romanian citizen). In 1940, he tied for 7-9th (Guimard won); took 6th in 1941 (Markas Luckis won); tied for 3rd-4th in 1942 (Hermann Pilnik won); took 2nd, behind Gideon Ståhlberg, in 1943, winning the title (as regulations changed); shared 6th in 1944 (Héctor Rossetto won). Iliesco (then Argentine citizen) lost a match for the title to Rossetto (0.5 : 4.5) at Nueve de Julio 1944.

He took 3rd in ARG-ch 1945 (Pilnik won); took 9th in 1946 (Julio Bolbochán won); took 4th in 1947 (Rossetto won); tied for 10-11th in 1948 (Julio Bolbochán won); shared 17th in 1949 (Miguel Najdorf won); took 11th in 1950 (Carlos Maderna won); tied for 18-19th in 1953 (Oscar Panno won).

Iliesco played also many times in international tournaments in Mar del Plata. He tied for 12-13th in 1934 (Aron Schvartzman won); took 6th in 1936 (Pléci won); took 15th in 1941 (Stahlberg won); tied for 14-15th in 1942 (Najdorf won); shared 10th in 1943 (Najdorf won); tied for 13-14th in 1944 (Pilnik and Najdorf won); took 11th in 1945 (Najdorf won); tied for 12-15th in 1946 (Najdorf won), and took 18th in 1947 (Najdorf won); took 9th in 1949 (Rossetto won).

He lost a match against Guimard (2 : 6) at Mar del Plata 1944; took 9th at La Plata (Jockey Club) 1944 (Najdorf won); and took 5th in San Francisco, Argentina (César Corte won).
