= 1944 in chess =

The below is a list of events in chess in the year 1944.

== Chess events in brief ==
- 27 June 1944 – Vera Manchik-Stevenson, first official Women's World Chess Champion (since 1927), represented Russia (1927), Czechoslovakia (1930–37), and England (1939), who was widowed the previous year, still holding the title, her younger sister, Olga Menchik-Rubery, and their mother were killed in a V-1 rocket bombing raid which destroyed their home at 47 Gauden Road in the Clapham area of South London. According to some sources, Kent was the place of their death.

== Tournaments ==
- Radom (the 5th GG-ch), won by Efim Bogoljubow ahead of Fedor Bogatyrchuk, February 1944.
- Mar del Plata won by Hermann Pilnik and Miguel Najdorf ahead of Paul Michel and Carlos Guimard, 15–31 March 1944.
- La Plata won by Najdorf followed by Gideon Ståhlberg, Julio Bolbochán, etc.
- Buenos Aires won by Moshe Czerniak.
- Rio de Janeiro won by Erich Eliskases.
- New York City (the U.S. Chess Championship), won by Arnold Denker, April – May 1944.
- Moscow (the 13th USSR Chess Championship), won by Mikhail Botvinnik followed by Vasily Smyslov, Isaac Boleslavsky, Salo Flohr, etc., 21 May – 17 June 1944.
- Kraków won by Rudolf Teschner, start 27 May 1944.
- Posen, Reichsgau Wartheland, (Reichsmeisterschaft "Kraft durch Freude"), won by Hans Müller.
- Brunn (the Bohemia and Moravia Chess Championship), won by Karel Opočenský.
- Paris (Championship of the City), won by César Boutteville.
- Lidköping (the Swedish Chess Championship) won by Stig Lundholm, 26 June – 1 July 1944.
- Gijón won by Alexander Alekhine ahead of Antonio Medina, 14–23 July 1944.
- Boston (the 45th U.S. Open), won by Samuel Reshevsky ahead of Anthony Santasiere, 29 July – 10 August 1944.
- Stockholm won by Erik Lundin ahead of Gösta Danielsson, 21–31 August 1944.
- Ivanovo won by Alexander Kotov and Viacheslav Ragozin, 20 September – 8 October 1944.
- Riga (the Baltic Chess Championship), won by Paul Keres, 25 December 1944 – 9 January 1945.
- Moscow (Championship of the City), won by Smyslov followed by Ragozin, Andor Lilienthal, Flohr, December 1944 – January 1945.

== Matches ==
- Carlos Guimard defeated Juan Iliesco (6 : 2) in Mar del Plata, Argentina.
- Héctor Rossetto beat Juan Iliesco (4,5 : 0,5) in Nueve de Julio (23rd ARG-ch).
- Erich Eliskases beat João de Souza Mendes (7 : 3) in Rio de Janeiro, Brazil.
- Stepan Popel drew with Fedor Bogatyrchuk (2 : 2) in Kraków, General Government.
- Paul Keres beat Folke Ekström (5 : 1) in Stockholm, Sweden.
- Alexander Alekhine won against Ramón Rey Ardid (2,5 : 1,5) in Saragossa, Spain.
- On 2 December 1944 Bletchley Park defeated the Oxford University Chess Club in a twelve-board team match 8 : 4. C.H.O'D. Alexander, Harry Golombek, James Macrae Aitken, and I. J. Good played the top four boards for the Bletchley Park team.

== Births ==
- 12 January – Vlastimil Hort in Kladno, Czech GM
- 19 February – Chen Zude, President of the Chinese Chess Association
- 6 April – Florin Gheorghiu, Romania's first GM, nine-time winner of the Romanian Championship
- 6 April – Jude Acers in Long Beach, California, American chess player
- 16 April – Nikolai Shalnev, German GM
- 18 April – Albin Planinc in Briše, Slovenian GM
- 27 April – Heikki Westerinen in Helsinki, Finnish GM, four-time winner of the Finnish Championship
- 5 May – Roman Dzindzichashvili in Tbilisi, Russian/American GM, two time US Champion
- 26 May – Ljuba Kristol in Leningrad, Israeli ICCGM, two-time World Correspondence Champion
- 1 July – Davorin Komljenović, Croatian GM
- 4 July – Albert Kapengut in Kazan, Soviet chess player and coach
- 4 July – Silvino García Martínez, Cuban GM
- 5 September – Jørn Sloth in Sjørring, Danish GMC, World Correspondence Champion 1975–1980
- 7 September – Sam Sloan in Richmond, Virginia, American chess player and writer
- 25 September – Vitaly Tseshkovsky in Omsk, Russian GM and two-time winner of the USSR Championship (died 2011)
- 15 November – Hans Ree in Amsterdam, Dutch GM and chess writer
- Rani Hamid, Bangladeshi WIM, three-time winner of the British Women's Championship

== Deaths ==
- Wilhelm Orbach, German master, murdered in Auschwitz.
- Jorgen Moeller, Danish master, died in Denmark. Nordic Chess Champion (1899 and 1901), the Moeller Attack in the Giuoco Piano and the Moeller Defense in the Ruy Lopez.
- Nikoly Rudnev, Ukrainian master, died probably in Uzbekistan.
- 3 February – Albert Hodges, 1894 US Chess Champion
- ca. 9 February Dawid Daniuszewski, Polish master, died in the Łódź Ghetto.
- ca. 9 February Salomon Szapiro, Polish master, died in the Łódź Ghetto.
- 12 April – Roberto Grau died in Buenos Aires. South American and Argentine Champion.
- 3 June – Adolf Zinkl, Austrian master, died in Vienna.
- 27 June – Vera Menchik, the 1st Women's World Chess Champion, died in a German bombing raid, London, England.
- 27 June – Olga Menchik, the younger sister of Vera, died in a German bombing raid, London, England.
- 2 November – Karol Irzykowski, Polish master, died in Żyrardów.
- 9 November – Frank James Marshall, American grandmaster, died in Jersey City, USA.
- 29 December – Endre Steiner, Hungarian master, murdered in a Nazi concentration camp.
