= Heinrich Reinhardt =

German–Argentine chess player (1903–1990)

Enrique Alfredo Reinhardt
Personal information
- Born: Heinrich Alfred Kurt Reinhardt; March 29, 1903 Stettin, German Empire
- Died: June 14, 1990 (aged 87) Ciudad Jardín Lomas del Palomar, Argentina

Chess career
- Country: Germany (before 1940); Argentina (after 1940)

Enrique Alfredo (born Heinrich Alfred) Kurt Reinhardt (29 March 1903, Stettin, German Empire – 14 June 1990, Ciudad Jardín Lomas del Palomar, Argentina) was a German–Argentine chess master.

== Biography ==
In 1932, he tied for 3rd-5th in Hamburg–Altona (Herbert Heinicke won). In 1935, he won a match against Herbert Taube in Hamburg (5 : 1). In 1937, he tied for 3rd-4th in Berlin (Friedrich Sämisch won). In 1937, he tied for 2nd-3rd in Bremen (Efim Bogoljubow won). In 1937, he won in Hamburg. In 1937, he won in Magdeburg. In 1938, he won in Hamburg–Bergedorf. In 1938, he took 11th in Bad Oeynhausen (5th German Championship; Erich Eliskases won).

Heinrich Reinhardt played for Germany at first reserve board (+5 –4 =3) in the 8th Chess Olympiad at Buenos Aires 1939. He won the team gold medal. When World War II broke out, Reinhardt along with all the other German players (Erich Eliskases, Paul Michel, Ludwig Engels, Albert Becker) and many other participants at the Olympiad, decided to stay permanently in Argentina.

In 1945, Enrique Reinhardt tied for 2nd-5th with Carlos Skalicka, René Letelier and Moshe Czerniak, in Quilmes (Gideon Ståhlberg won). In 1946, he took 10th in Mar del Plata (Miguel Najdorf won). In 1950, he took 3rd in Buenos Aires (Argentine Championship; Carlos Maderna won).

In 1951, he took 13th in Mar del Plata (zt; Eliskases and Julio Bolbochán won). In 1952, he tied for 7-8th in Mar del Plata (Bolbochán and Héctor Rossetto won). In 1955, he took 17th in Buenos Aires (Borislav Ivkov won). In 1956, he tied for 13-14th in Buenos Aires (ARG-ch; Raúl Sanguineti won). In 1958, he tied for 9-10th in Mar del Plata (Bent Larsen won). In 1960, he tied for 4-6th in Buenos Aires (ARG-ch; Najdorf won). In 1960, he took 6th in São Paulo (zt; Bolbochán won). In 1961, he took 9th in Mar del Plata (Najdorf won).

He died on 14 June 1990 in Ciudad Jardín Lomas del Palomar, Argentina.
