= Juan Vinuesa =

Argentine chess player

Juan Vinuesa was an Argentine chess master.

He played thrice in Argentine Chess Championship (Torneo Mayor); tied for 5-7th in 1934 (Roberto Grau won), tied for 8-9th in 1936 (Carlos Guimard won), and tied for 4-6th in 1937 (Jacobo Bolbochán won).

In international tournaments, he shared 3rd at Buenos Aires 1934/35 (the 5th South American Chess Championship, Torneio Sulamericano, Luis Piazzini won), tied for 3rd-4th at Mar del Plata 1936 (the 6th Torneo Sudamericano, Isaías Pleci won), tied for 4-7th at Rosario 1939 (Vladimirs Petrovs won), and tied for 10-12th in the Mar del Plata 1941 chess tournament (Gideon Ståhlberg won).
