= Carlos Maderna =

Argentine chess player (1910–1976)

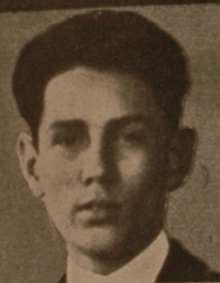
Maderna in 1928

Carlos Hugo Maderna (4 August 1910 – 23 January 1976) was an Argentine chess master.

== Chess Career ==
He was twice Argentine Champion; in 1940 he won a match for the title (of 1939) against Luis Piazzini (8 : 6), then lost a match to Carlos Guimard (1 : 8) in 1941 (for the title of 1940), and won the title (of 1950) after play-off with Jacobo Bolbochán and Heinrich Reinhardt in 1951.

In 1928, he tied for 4-5th in Mar del Plata International Chess Tournament (Roberto Grau won). In 1931, he won ahead of Savielly Tartakower in Buenos Aires (Geniol it). In 1934/35 he took 16th in South American Chess Championship in Buenos Aires (Piazzini won). In 1938, he tied for 5-6th in Montevideo (Carrasco, Alexander Alekhine won). In 1948, he won in Santa Fe.

He participated in the first and second South American zonal tournaments. He took 3rd, after Erich Eliskases and Julio Bolbochán, at Mar del Plata / Buenos Aires 1951, and tied for 11-12th at Mar del Plata / Buenos Aires 1954 (Oscar Panno won).

Maderna played for Argentina in two Chess Olympiads:

- In 1928 at second board in 2nd Chess Olympiad in The Hague (+5 -5 =1);
- In 1935 at fourth board in 6th Chess Olympiad in Warsaw (+5 -4 =10).
