= Konex chess tournament =

Argentine chess event

The first Konex Master Chess Tournament organized by the founder and president of the Konex Foundation, Luis Ovsejevich, started off in Buenos Aires in 1977. The foundation sponsored Marcelo Tempone, World Chess Champion Junior, for further training and so as to participate in international tournaments (1979-1980), the Argentine Team to the Olympiads for players under 26, held at Mexico City 1980, the Argentine Chess Team, to the First World Chess Championship for Teams, held in Lucerne, Switzerland, in 1985, Hugo Spangenberg (13 years old) in the Infant World Chess Championship, at Puerto Rico 1989, and the participation of the Argentine and South American (Female) Champion Claudia Amura in the Inter-Zone Chess Tournament in Moscow, Russia, in 1990.

== Konex Master Chess Tournament ==
| # | Year | Winner |
|---|---|---|
| 1 | 1977 (National, closed) | Raúl Sanguineti (Argentina) |
| 2 | 1979 (International invitation tournament) | Viktor Korchnoi (Switzerland); Ljubomir Ljubojević (Yugoslavia) |
| 3 | 1980 (Open tournament) | Jorge Szmetan (Argentina), clear first |
| 4 | 1985 (Zonal) | Miguel Quinteros (Argentina); Iván Morovic (Chile) |
| 5 | 1987 (International invitation tournament) | Mikhail Tal (Soviet Union) |
| 6 | 1988 (International invitation tournament) | Gilberto Milos (Brazil); Zenon Franco (Paraguay) |
| 7 | 1991 (Open tournament) | Pablo Ricardi (Argentina), first on tie-break |
| 8 | 1994 (Open tournament) | Pablo Zarnicki (Argentina), first on tie-break |
