= Virgilio Fenoglio =

Argentine chess player

Virgilio Fenoglio (February 20, 1902, in Santa Fe – March 15, 1990, in Buenos Aires) was an Argentine chess master, winner of 37 tournaments.

He played 13 times in Argentine Chess Championship, in the period 1928–1959. He was a winner of Torneo Mayor in 1930, but lost a match for the title to Isaías Pleci (4 : 6) in 1931.

He tied for 3rd–6th at Mar del Plata 1934 (the 4th South American Chess Championship, Aaron Schwartzman won), tied for 13–14th at Buenos Aires 1934/35 (the 5th South American–ch, Luis Piazzini won), shared 3rd at Mar del Plata 1936 (the 6th South American–ch, Pléci won), took 3rd at São Paulo 1937 (the 7th South American–ch, Rodrigo Flores won), took 3rd in the Montevideo 1938 chess tournament (the 8th South American–ch, Alexander Alekhine won), shared 1st with Carlos Guimard and Julio Bolbochán at Rio de Janeiro 1938 (Torneio Sulamericano), tied for 14–15th at Mar del Plata chess tournament 1942 (Miguel Najdorf won), and took 12th at Mar del Plata 1943 (Najdorf won).
