= Aldo Emilio Seidler =

Argentine chess player

Personal information
- Born: 1954 (age 71–72)

Chess career
- Country: Argentina

Aldo Emilio Seidler (born 1954), is an Argentine chess player.

== Biography ==
In the 1970s Aldo Emilio Seidler was one of Argentina's leading junior chess players. He twice won Argentine Chess Junior Championships: 1971 and 1973. He twice participated in the Argentine Chess Championship finals (1976, 1978). His best result in this tournaments was 5th place in 1976 He was participant in a number of strong international chess tournaments. Aldo Emilio Seidler twice won Mar del Plata Open Chess Tournament (1976, 1978).

Aldo Emilio Seidler played for Argentina B team in the Chess Olympiad:

- In 1978, at second board in the 23rd Chess Olympiad in Buenos Aires (+6, =3, -3).
