= Moschini =

Moschini is a surname. Notable people with the surname include:

- Celia Baudot de Moschini (1910–2006), Argentine chess player
- Francesco Moschini (born 1948), Italian architect, art historian, historian and professor of architecture
- Giacomo Moschini (1896–1943), Italian film actor
- Giannantonio Moschini (1773–1840), Italian author and art critic
- Rolando Mosca Moschini (born 1939), Italian army general
- Silvina Moschini (born 1972), Argentine entrepreneur
