= Juan Carlos Hase =

Argentine chess player

Personal information
- Born: 24 April 1948 Buenos Aires, Argentina
- Died: 3 February 2022 (aged 73)

Chess career
- Country: Argentina
- Title: International Master (1982)
- Peak rating: 2445 (July 1982)

Juan Carlos Hase (24 April 1948 – 3 February 2022), was an Argentine chess International Master (1982), Argentine Chess Championship medalist (1982).

== Biography ==
In the 1970s and 1980s Juan Carlos Hase was one of the leading Argentine chess players. He took part in Argentine Chess Championship finals many times and in 1982 shared 1st-5th place. After additional tournament he won silver medal behind winner Jorge Rubinetti.

Juan Carlos Hase played for Argentina in the Chess Olympiads:

- In 1972, at second reserve board in the 20th Chess Olympiad in Skopje (+6, =5, -4),
- In 1978, at third board in the 23rd Chess Olympiad in Buenos Aires (+4, =5, -1),
- In 1980, at second reserve board in the 24th Chess Olympiad in La Valletta (+4, =2, -0),
- In 1982, at third board in the 25th Chess Olympiad in Lucerne (+1, =2, -3).

In 1982, Juan Carlos Hase was awarded the FIDE International Master (IM) title.
