= Ariel Sorín =

Argentine chess grandmaster (born 1967)

Personal information
- Born: Ariel Hugo Sorín; 26 April 1967 (age 59) Buenos Aires, Argentina

Chess career
- Country: Argentina
- Title: Grandmaster (1995)
- Peak rating: 2519 (July 2002)

Ariel Hugo Sorín (born 26 April 1967) is an Argentine chess player who holds the FIDE title of Grandmaster.

== Career ==
He played three times in the Panamerican Junior Championships, and took 2nd at Saladillo 1985, tied for 5-7th at Quito 1986, and tied for 4-5th at Asunción 1987. He was Argentine Junior Champion in 1987. He took 3rd place at the 1987 Argentina Absolute Championship. He took 4th at the 1988 La Habana Panamerican Championship. In 1989, he won the Magistral III Mar del Plata, and tied for 1st-2nd with James Mann de Toledo in Buenos Aires. Sorin is known to play online by the handle A_Sorin on lichess, chess.com and playchess.com. His online tutoring can be found on playchess.com.

He was City of Buenos Aires 1993 Champion. He was a winner of the "Magistral Ciudad de San Martín" 1994, the "Magistral Circulo de Ajedrez Torre Blanca" 1994, and the "Groningen Masters Tournament" 1994. He took 2nd at the 1995 ARG-ch (Pablo Ricardi won). In 1998, he took 2nd in Buenos Aires (Boca Juniors-op, Maxim Sorokin won).

Sorin was Argentine Champion in 2000 and 2004. He took 5th at Buenos Aires 2003 (Andres Rodriguez won).

Sorin has played for Argentina in three Chess Olympiads.

- In 1994, at second reserve board in 31st Chess Olympiad in Moscow (+3 –2 =5);
- In 1996, at first reserve board in 32nd Chess Olympiad in Yerevan (+2 –1 =4);
- In 2004, at fourth board in 36th Chess Olympiad in Calvia (+3 –3 =5).

Sorin was awarded the International Master title in 1989, and the Grandmaster (GM) title in 1995.
