= Carlos Juárez =

Carlos Juárez may refer to:

- Carlos Juárez (politician) (1916-2010), Argentine politician
- Carlos Eleodoro Juárez (born 1938), Argentine chess player
- Carlos Juárez (chess) (born 1965), Guatemalan chess player
- Carlos Juárez (footballer) (born 1972), Argentine-born Ecuadorian footballer
