= Virginia Justo =

Argentine chess player (born 1963)

Personal information
- Born: 5 August 1963 (age 62)

Chess career
- Country: Argentina
- Title: Woman International Master (1982)

Virginia Justo (born 5 August 1963) is an Argentine chess player who holds the FIDE title of Woman International Master (1982). She is a four-time winner of the Argentine Women's Chess Championship (1978, 1982, 1983, 1984) and a Women's Chess Olympiad individual silver medalist (1984).

== Biography ==
From the late 1970s to the early 2000s Virginia Justo was one of the leading Argentine women's chess players. She four time in row won Argentine Women's Chess Championships: 1978, 1982, 1983, and 1984. In 1978, in Morón she shared the first place with Jussara Chaves, Edith Soppe and Giovanna Arbunic Castro in FIDE Women's World Chess Championship South America Zonal Tournament and was awarded the FIDE Woman International Master (WIM) title. In South American zonal play-off Virginia Justo ranked 2nd behind Arbunic Castro and not reached Women's World Chess Championship Interzonal tournament. In 2007, she participated in American Women's Continental Chess Championship.

Virginia Justo played for Argentina in the Women's Chess Olympiads:

- In 1978, at third board in the 8th Chess Olympiad (women) in Buenos Aires (+4, =3, -2),
- In 1980, at third board in the 9th Chess Olympiad (women) in Valletta (+4, =2, -3),
- In 1982, at second board in the 10th Chess Olympiad (women) in Lucerne (+4, =4, -4),
- In 1984, at first board in the 26th Chess Olympiad (women) in Thessaloniki (+7, =3, -1) and won individual silver medal,
- In 2004, at first reserve board in the 36th Chess Olympiad (women) in Calvià (+3, =5, -0).
