= Vinuesa (surname) =

Vinuesa is a Spanish surname. Notable people with the surname include.

- Alba Vinuesa (born 1999), Spanish rugby union player
- Alfonso de Vinuesa (1958–1997), Spanish racing driver
- Antonio Palomares Vinuesa (1930–2007), Spanish politician
- Carola Garcia de Vinuesa (born 1969), Spanish-Australian medical doctor
- Juan Vinuesa, Argentine chess player
- Ricardo Vinuesa (born 1986), Spanish-Swedish physicist
