= Jorge Gómez Baillo =

Argentine chess player (born 1959)

Personal information
- Born: 19 April 1959 (age 67)

Chess career
- Country: Argentina
- Title: International Master (1986)
- Peak rating: 2460 (January 1996)

Jorge Gómez Baillo (born 19 April 1959), is an Argentine chess International Master (IM) (1986), Argentine Chess Championship winner (1983), Chess Olympiad individual gold medalist (1988).

== Biography ==
Jorge Gómez Baillo was one of Argentina's leading chess players in the 1980s. Multiple medalist of the Argentine Chess Championships:

- In 1982, shared 1st-4th place, but remained in 3rd place after the extra tournament;
- In 1983, shared 1st-2nd place and won an additional match for the title of champion;
- In 1985, shared 3rd-4th place;
- In 1988, ranked 2nd.

Jorge Gómez Baillo played for Argentina in the Chess Olympiads:

- In 1982, at second reserve board in the 25th Chess Olympiad in Lucerne (+1, =1, -2),
- In 1984, at third board in the 26th Chess Olympiad in Thessaloniki (+1, =5, -3),
- In 1988, at second reserve board in the 28th Chess Olympiad in Thessaloniki (+5, =2, -0) and won individual gold medal,
- In 1990, at fourth board in the 29th Chess Olympiad in Novi Sad (+4, =7, -0).

Jorge Gómez Baillo played for Argentina in the World Team Chess Championship:

- In 1985, at first reserve board in the 1st World Team Chess Championship in Lucerne (+0, =3, -1).

Jorge Gómez Baillo played for Argentina in the Pan American Team Chess Championship:

- In 1987, at third board in the 3rd Pan American Team Chess Championship in Junín (+2, =1, -2) and won team bronze and individual silver medals.

Jorge Gómez Baillo played for Argentina in the South American Team Chess Championship:

- In 1989, at second board in the 1st South American Team Chess Championship in Mar del Plata (+1, =1, -0) and won team and individual gold medals.

Jorge Gómez Baillo played for Argentina in the World Youth U26 Team Chess Championships:

- In 1981, at third board in the 3rd World Youth U26 Team Chess Championship in Graz (+2, =1, -4),
- In 1983, at first board in the 4th World Youth U26 Team Chess Championship in Chicago (+2, =3, -3).

In 1986, he was awarded the FIDE International Master (IM) title.
