= Dora Trepat de Navarro =

Argentine chess player (1910–1971)

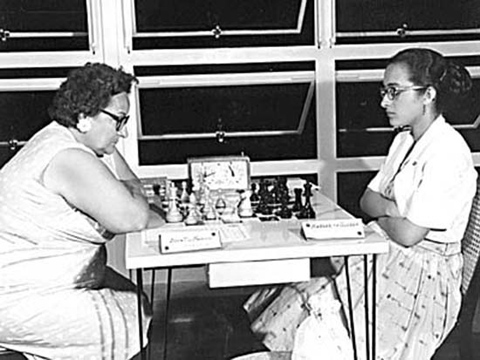
- Dora Trepata de Navarro (left) during a chess tournament

Personal information
- Born: 1910
- Died: 1971 (aged 60–61)

Chess career
- Country: Argentina

Dora Trepat de Navarro (1910–1971) was an Argentine chess player. She was an eight-time winner of the Argentine Women's Chess Championship (1938, 1939, 1940, 1941, 1942, 1959, 1960, 1964) and a participant at the Women's World Chess Championship (1939).

== Biography ==
Dora Trepat de Navarro started played chess in the Buenos Aires chess club Club de Ajedrez Jaque Mate de la Capital Federal. From 1935 to 1939 and from 1954 she worked as chess instructor in the club San Lorenzo de Almagro. From the late 1930s to the early 1960s Dora Trepat de Navarro was one of the leading Argentine women's chess players. In 1938, she won the first Argentine Women's Chess Championship. In 1939 Dora Trepat de Navarro participated in the Women's World Chess Championship in Buenos Aires and took 12th place (tournament was won by Vera Menchik). She two times ranked 3rd in Women's World Chess Championship South America Zonal Tournaments (1954, 1966). In 1964, Dora Trepat de Navarro last time won the Argentine Women's Chess Championship.
