= Roberto Luis Debarnot =

Argentine chess player (1947–2018)

Personal information
- Born: 5 August 1947 Buenos Aires, Argentina
- Died: 25 May 2018 (aged 70)

Chess career
- Country: Argentina
- Title: International Master (1977)
- Peak rating: 2430 (January 1980)

Roberto Luis Debarnot (5 August 1947 – 25 May 2018) was an Argentine chess International Master (1977), two-times Argentine Chess Championship medalist (1973, 1980).

== Biography ==
In the 1970s, Roberto Luis Debarnot was one of the leading Argentine chess players. He took part in Argentine Chess Championship finals many times and won two medals: silver (1973, after lost additional match for champions title to Raúl Sanguineti) and bronze (1980). One of Roberto Debarnot's greatest successes in international chess tournaments was the 2nd place (after tie-briek) in Linares International Chess Tournament in 1978.

Roberto Luis Debarnot played for Argentina in the Chess Olympiads:

- In 1972, at first reserve board in the 20th Chess Olympiad in Skopje (+4, =8, -3),
- In 1974, at second reserve board in the 21st Chess Olympiad in Nice (+3, =3, -4),
- In 1980, at third board in the 24th Chess Olympiad in La Valletta (+3, =1, -4).

In 1977, Roberto Luis Debarnot was awarded the FIDE International Master (IM) title. In 1995, he stopped participating in FIDE tournaments.
