= Hugo Spangenberg =

Argentine chess grandmaster (born 1975)

Personal information
- Born: 22 November 1975 (age 50)

Chess career
- Country: Argentina
- Title: Grandmaster (1996)
- FIDE rating: 2469 (July 2026)
- Peak rating: 2565 (July 1997)

Hugo Hernán Spangenberg (born 22 November 1975) is an Argentine chess grandmaster.

== Career ==
In 1989 he entered the World Youth Chess Championships, in Puerto Rico. He won at Cubatão 1989 (the 1st Campeonato Panamericano U-14), and took 3rd at Halle 1995 (World Junior Chess Championship, U-20).

Spangenberg was Argentine Champion in 1993 and Sub-Champion in 1996. He shared 1st with Pablo Ricardi at Villa Gesell 1996, won at Buenos Aires 1998, and tied for 1st-3rd with Carlos Garcia Palermo and Herman Van Riemsdijk at La Plata 1998.

He thrice represented Argentina in Chess Olympiads at Moscow 1994, Yerevan 1996, and Elista 1998.

He was awarded the Grandmaster title in 1996.
