= Women's World Chess Championship 1959 =

The 1959 Women's World Chess Championship was won by Elisabeth Bykova, who successfully defended her title in a match against challenger Kira Zvorykina.

== 1959 Candidates Tournament ==
The Candidates Tournament was held in Plovdiv in May 1959 and won by Zvorykina, who earned the right to challenge the reigning champion Bykova for the title.

1959 Women's Candidates Tournament
| | Player | 1 | 2 | 3 | 4 | 5 | 6 | 7 | 8 | 9 | 10 | 11 | 12 | 13 | 14 | 15 | Points | Tie break |
|---|---|---|---|---|---|---|---|---|---|---|---|---|---|---|---|---|---|---|
| 1 | Kira Zvorykina (Soviet Union) | - | ½ | ½ | ½ | ½ | 1 | ½ | 1 | 1 | 1 | 1 | 1 | 1 | 1 | 1 | 11½ | |
| 2 | Verica Nedeljković (Yugoslavia) | ½ | - | ½ | 1 | 1 | 1 | 1 | ½ | 1 | 0 | 1 | 1 | 1 | ½ | ½ | 10½ | |
| 3 | Larissa Volpert (Soviet Union) | ½ | ½ | - | ½ | ½ | 0 | 1 | ½ | 1 | 1 | 1 | 0 | 1 | 1 | 1 | 9½ | |
| 4 | Salme Rootare (Soviet Union) | ½ | 0 | ½ | - | ½ | 0 | 1 | ½ | 1 | 1 | ½ | ½ | 1 | 1 | 1 | 9 | 54.00 |
| 5 | Edith Keller-Herrmann (East Germany) | ½ | 0 | ½ | ½ | - | 0 | ½ | 1 | 1 | ½ | 1 | ½ | 1 | 1 | 1 | 9 | 53.50 |
| 6 | Milunka Lazarević (Yugoslavia) | 0 | 0 | 1 | 1 | 1 | - | 0 | 1 | 0 | 1 | 0 | ½ | ½ | 1 | 1 | 8 | |
| 7 | Eva Ladanyike-Karakas (Hungary) | ½ | 0 | 0 | 0 | ½ | 1 | - | 0 | ½ | 1 | ½ | ½ | 1 | 1 | 1 | 7½ | |
| 8 | Valentina Borisenko (Soviet Union) | 0 | ½ | ½ | ½ | 0 | 0 | 1 | - | 0 | ½ | ½ | 1 | 1 | 1 | ½ | 7 | |
| 9 | Olga Rubtsova (Soviet Union) | 0 | 0 | 0 | 0 | 0 | 1 | ½ | 1 | - | 0 | ½ | 1 | ½ | 1 | 1 | 6½ | |
| 10 | Kveta Eretova (Czechoslovakia) | 0 | 1 | 0 | 0 | ½ | 0 | 0 | ½ | 1 | - | ½ | ½ | 1 | ½ | ½ | 6 | |
| 11 | Gisela Kahn Gresser (USA) | 0 | 0 | 0 | ½ | 0 | 1 | ½ | ½ | ½ | ½ | - | ½ | ½ | 0 | 1 | 5½ | |
| 12 | Elfriede Rinder (West Germany) | 0 | 0 | 1 | ½ | ½ | ½ | ½ | 0 | 0 | ½ | ½ | - | 0 | ½ | 0 | 4½ | 33.75 |
| 13 | Maria Pogorevici (Romania) | 0 | 0 | 0 | 0 | 0 | ½ | 0 | 0 | ½ | 0 | ½ | 1 | - | 1 | 1 | 4½ | 20.50 |
| 14 | Paunka Todorova (Bulgaria) | 0 | ½ | 0 | 0 | 0 | 0 | 0 | 0 | 0 | ½ | 1 | ½ | 0 | - | 1 | 3½ | |
| 15 | Soledad Gonzalez de Huguet (Argentina) | 0 | ½ | 0 | 0 | 0 | 0 | 0 | ½ | 0 | ½ | 0 | 1 | 0 | 0 | - | 2½ | |

== 1959 Championship Match ==
The championship match was played in Moscow in 1959. Bykova won comfortably and retained her title.

Women's World Championship Match 1959
| | 1 | 2 | 3 | 4 | 5 | 6 | 7 | 8 | 9 | 10 | 11 | 12 | 13 | Total |
|---|---|---|---|---|---|---|---|---|---|---|---|---|---|---|
| Elisabeth Bykova (Soviet Union) | 0 | 1 | ½ | 1 | 0 | ½ | 1 | ½ | ½ | 1 | 1 | 1 | ½ | 8½ |
| Kira Zvorykina (Soviet Union) | 1 | 0 | ½ | 0 | 1 | ½ | 0 | ½ | ½ | 0 | 0 | 0 | ½ | 4½ |
