= Martín Lorenzini =

Argentine chess grandmaster (born 1975)

Personal information
- Born: September 26, 1975 (age 50) Santa Fe, Argentina

Chess career
- Country: Argentina
- Title: Grandmaster (2014)
- Peak rating: 2491 (November 2013)

Martín Lorenzini is an Argentine chess grandmaster.

== Chess career ==
He won the Córdoba City Chess Championship in 2010 and 2011, going undefeated in both years.

He won the Argentine Chess Championship in 2011.

In September 2012, he played on reserve board 1 for Argentina in the 40th Chess Olympiad, scoring +2-1=3.

He was awarded the Grandmaster title in 2014, achieving his norms at the:

- XI Open Anibal Linares in March 2005
- 86. Camp Argentino Superior in July 2012
- 89. Camp Argentino Superior in July 2014
