= Rubén Felgaer =

Argentine chess grandmaster (born 1981)

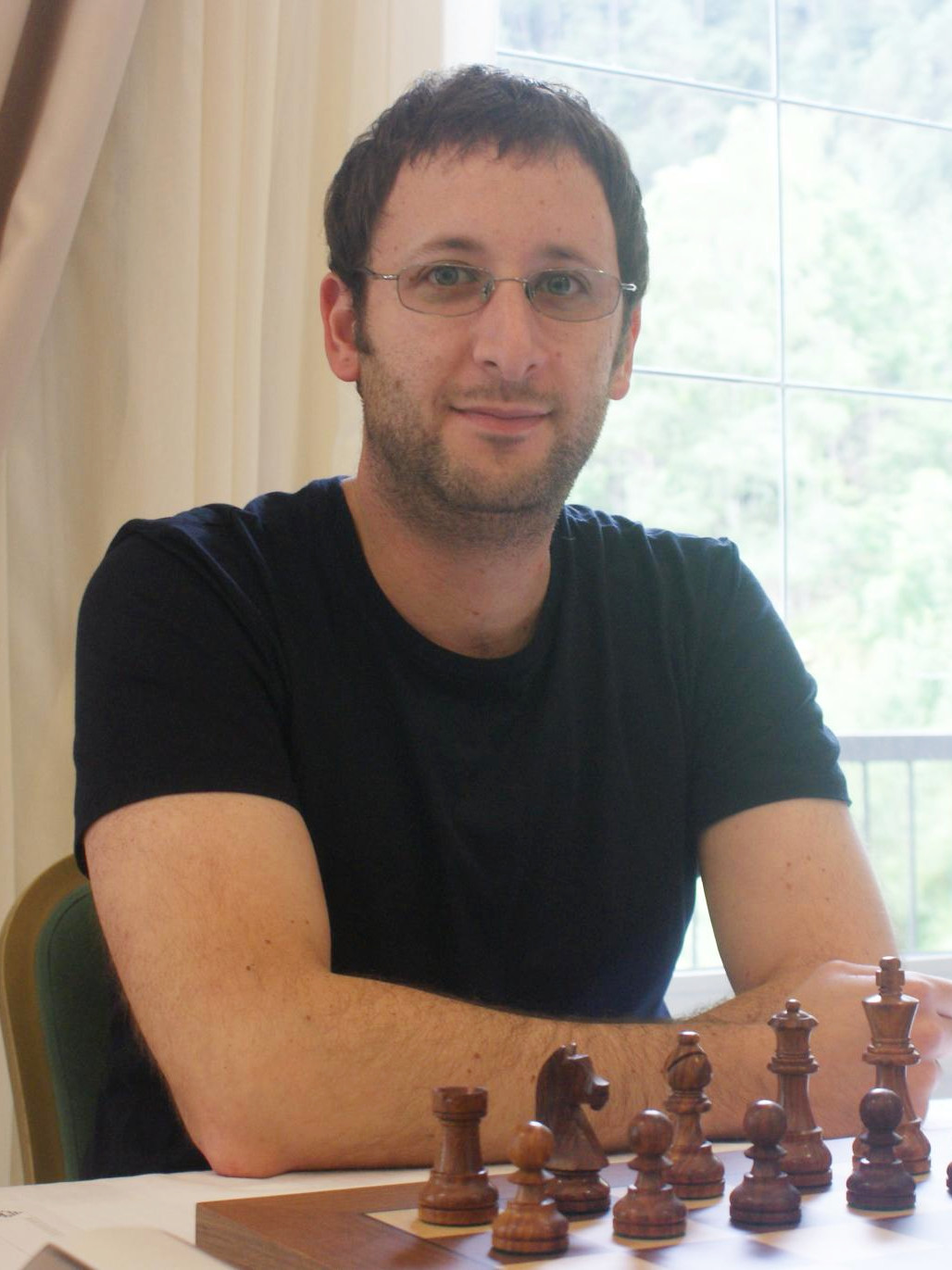
- Felgaer in 2013

Personal information
- Born: 4 April 1981 (age 45) Buenos Aires, Argentina

Chess career
- Country: Argentina
- Title: Grandmaster (2002)
- FIDE rating: 2556 (July 2026)
- Peak rating: 2624 (October 2005)
- Peak ranking: No. 86 (October 2005)

Rubén Felgaer (born 4 April 1981) is an Argentine chess player who received the FIDE title of Grandmaster (GM) in 2002. He is a five-time Argentine Chess Champion.

== Chess career ==
Felgaer won the Pan American Junior Chess Championship in 2000 and 2001. He was awarded the title of Grandmaster (GM) in 2002.

He was Argentine champion in 2001, 2007, 2008, 2010, and 2014.

In 2001, he shared first at Mar del Plata and took 7th in Buenos Aires (14th Najdorf Memorial; Anatoly Karpov won). In 2003, he tied for 2nd–9th in Lido degli Estensi (Artur Kogan won). In 2004, he tied for 3rd–5th in Havana (Capablanca Memorial; Leinier Domínguez won).

In 2005, Felgaer won in Vila de Sort, tied for 2nd–5th at Sevilla 2005 (Dos Hermanas, Teimour Radjabov won), and took 6th at Barcelona 2005 (Vassily Ivanchuk won). In October 2006 he played in a match Buenos Aires vs Warsaw, and drew with Bartosz Soćko (1 : 1) at first board in Buenos Aires (17th Najdorf Festival).

Felgaer played for Argentina in three Chess Olympiads.

- In 2002, at first board in 35th Chess Olympiad in Bled (+1 –4 =4);
- In 2004, at first board in 36th Chess Olympiad in Calvià (+2 –4 =5);
- In 2006, at first board in 37th Chess Olympiad in Turin (+2 –1 =2).

He participated in the FIDE World Chess Championship 2002 (knocked out in the first round by Loek van Wely) and in the FIDE World Chess Championship 2004 (knocked out in the second round by Alexey Dreev).
