= Julia Lebel-Arias =

Argentine chess player (born 1946)

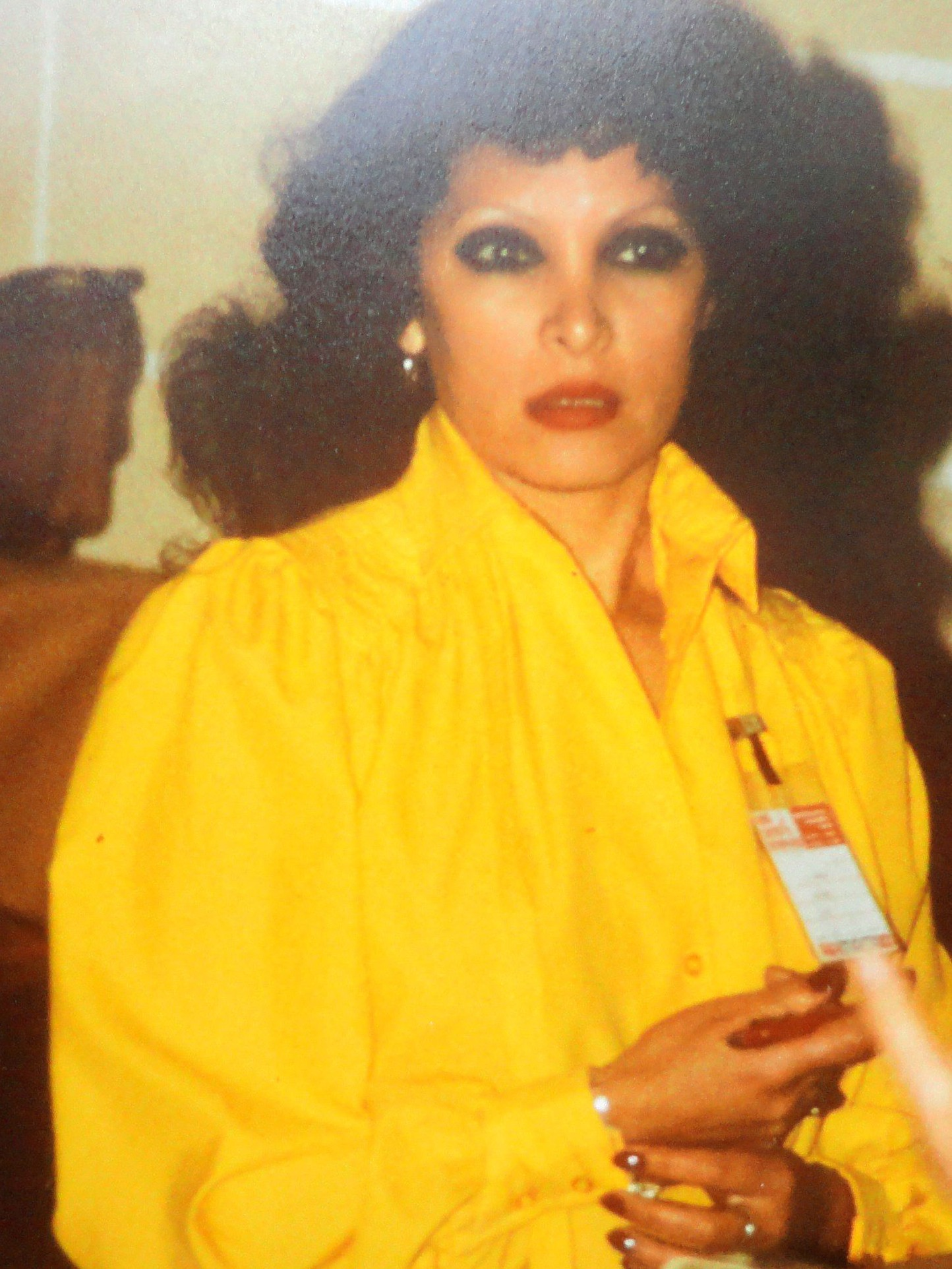
- Lebel-Arias in 1980

Personal information
- Born: 10 March 1946 (age 80) Aguilares, Argentina

Chess career
- Country: Argentina (until 1982); France (1981–2002); Monaco (since 2002)
- Title: Woman International Master (1985)
- Peak rating: 2150 (January 1987)

Julia Lebel-Arias (née Arias, born 10 March 1946) is an Argentina-born chess player and Woman International Master (WIM, 1985) who represented Argentina (until 1982), France (from 1982 till 2001) and Monaco (from 2002). She is a four-times winner of the Argentine Women's Chess Championship and a three-times winner of the French Women's Chess Championship.

== Biography ==
From the end of 1970s to the early 1980s, Lebel-Arias was one of the leading chess players in Argentina. She won the Argentine Women's Chess Championships in four consecutive years: 1974, 1975, 1976, and 1977. After moving to France, she three times won French Women's Chess Championship: 1983, 1986, and 1990. In 1985, she was awarded the FIDE Woman International Master (WIM) title. In 1988, she won the International Women's Chess Tournament in Dortmund.

Lebel-Arias twice participated in the Women's World Chess Championship Interzonal Tournaments:

- In 1985, at Interzonal Tournament in Zheleznovodsk shared 15th-16th place with Pepita Ferrer;
- In 1987, at Interzonal Tournament in Tuzla ranked 18th place.

Lebel-Arias played for Argentina, France and Monaco in the Women's Chess Olympiads:

- In 1976, at first board in the 7th Chess Olympiad (women) in Haifa (+2, =4, -4),
- In 1978, at second board in the 8th Chess Olympiad (women) in Buenos Aires (+4, =4, -3),
- In 1980, at second board in the 9th Chess Olympiad (women) in Valletta (+3, =4, -5),
- In 1982, at third reserve board in the 10th Chess Olympiad (women) in Lucerne (+5, =2, -1),
- In 1984, at second board in the 26th Chess Olympiad (women) in Thessaloniki (+4, =5, -4),
- In 1986, at first board in the 27th Chess Olympiad (women) in Dubai (+4, =2, -6),
- In 1988, at second board in the 28th Chess Olympiad (women) in Thessaloniki (+4, =3, -3),
- In 1990, at second board in the 29th Chess Olympiad (women) in Novi Sad (+3, =2, -6),
- In 2012, at third board in the 40th Chess Olympiad (women) in Istanbul (+5, =3, -3),
- In 2014, at first board in the 41st Chess Olympiad (women) in Tromsø (+2, =3, -3),
- In 2016, at first board in the 42nd Chess Olympiad (women) in Baku (+2, =1, -6),
- In 2018, at fourth board in the 43rd Chess Olympiad (women) in Batumi (+2, =2, -5).

Lebel-Arias played for Monaco in Chess Olympiad open events:

- In 2002, at second reserve board in the 35th Chess Olympiad in Bled (+2, =1, -4),
- In 2004, at reserve board in the 36th Chess Olympiad in Calvià (+4, =5, -5),
- In 2006, at fourth board in the 37th Chess Olympiad in Turin (+4, =0, -4).

Lebel-Arias played for France in the European Team Chess Championship:

- In 1997, at first reserve board in the 2nd European Team Chess Championship (women) in Pula (+2, =2, -2).

In 2006, in Arvier, she participated in the World Senior Chess Championship in the S50 age group and ranked 8th place.
