= Raúl Sanguineti =

Argentine chess grandmaster (1933–2000)

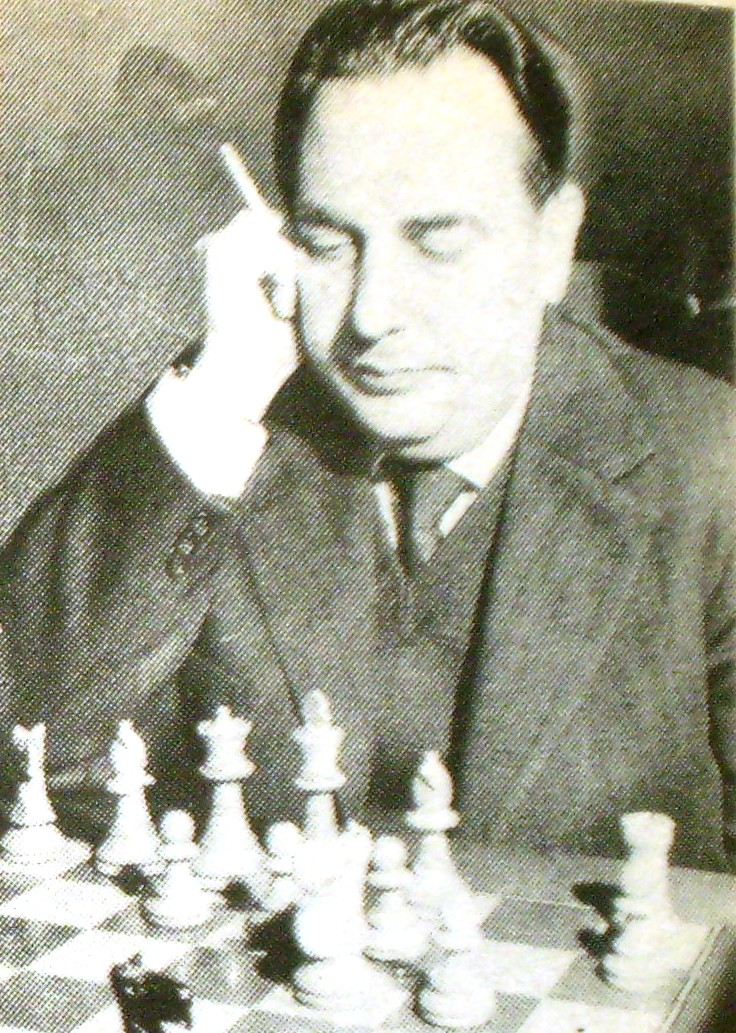
- Sanguineti in 1980

Personal information
- Full name: Raúl Carlos Sanguineti
- Born: 2 February 1933 Paraná
- Died: 6 August 2000 (aged 67) Buenos Aires

Chess career
- Country: Argentina
- Title: Honorary Grandmaster (1982); International Master (1957)
- Peak rating: 2530 (July 1971)
- Peak ranking: No. 47 (July 1971)

Raúl Carlos Sanguineti (Paraná, 2 February 1933 – Buenos Aires, 6 August 2000) was an Argentine chess Grandmaster. He won the Argentine Chess Championship seven times, in 1956, 1957, 1962, 1965, 1968, 1973 and 1974. Raúl Sanguineti played for Argentina in seven Chess Olympiads. He won two individual gold medals at Moscow 1956 and Varna 1962, and two team bronze medals at Munich 1958 and Varna 1962. In total, he represented his country in seven Olympiads with an aggregate of over 70 per cent (46 -7 =42). He played in the World Chess Championship Interzonals at Portorož 1958 and Biel 1976. Important tournament victories included São Paulo 1957, Bariloche 1960, Buenos Aires (Club Argentino) 1963, Punte del Este 1964, Buenos Aires Open 1968, Fortaleza Zonal 1975, Mar del Plata 1976, Buenos Aires 1977, and Santos Lugares 1977. During his competitive career, which ran from 1954 to 1977, he very rarely finished in the bottom half of the tournament table. In 1980 he won the Konex Award as one of the 5 best chess players of the decade in his country.

== Gold in national team debut ==
Sanguineti began his high-level tournament career at the 1954 Buenos Aires Zonal tournament in Mar del Plata, with a fine mid-place (tie for 7-9th place) finish of 10.5/20. He improved the next year, 1955, with an excellent tie for fourth place at the Argentine Championship at Buenos Aires, where he scored 12/19. Next was the very strong Buenos Aires 1955 event, which featured star Grandmasters Borislav Ivkov, Svetozar Gligorić, Hermann Pilnik and László Szabó, and he could only make 7.5/17 for 13th. But he followed this up with a much better result of third at the annual Mar del Plata International of 1956, which often attracted many of the world's best players during the 1950s and 1960s. There he scored 10.5/15 (tie for 3rd-4th).

Those strong performances earned him selection to the powerful national team, which was one of the world's top teams in the 1950s and 1960s. For example, Argentina finished second and earned team silver team medals at three straight Olympiads: Dubrovnik 1950, Helsinki 1952, and Amsterdam 1954. For Moscow 1956, Sanguineti made his debut on the first reserve board, and played sensationally to win the gold medal with a score of 9/11. Argentina finished fourth.

Further fine showings followed. At Mar del Plata 1957, he scored 10.5/17 for sixth in a high-class field which included world #3 Paul Keres, beating Soviet Grandmaster Alexander Kotov. He scored 9.5/11 to win at São Paulo 1957, finishing ahead of perennial Argentine champion Miguel Najdorf. He qualified out of Rio de Janeiro 1957, the South American Zonal, for the 1958 Interzonal tournament, tying for second with 11.5/15, and again topping Najdorf, who failed to qualify. He earned the International Master (IM) title in 1957 for this result. At Mar del Plata 1958, he tied for third with 9.5/15. Then came the Argentine Championship of 1958, where his 11.5/17 earned him fourth place. In 1958, he also won the CAVP tournament in Buenos Aires.

He played for Argentina at the 1958 World Students' Olympiad at Varna on board two, scoring 6/10. The Interzonal at Portorož was next, and although he failed to qualify further, he scored respectively from the strong field, with 10/20, to place 14th out of 21. On the same trip, he played for Argentina at the 1958 Munich Olympiad, again as first reserve, and scored 9.5/15. Argentina won the team bronze medals with a third-place finish.

== Beats Fischer, wins second gold medal ==
Returning to South America, he resumed his good streak with a tie for third at Lima 1959, with 9.5/13. At Buenos Aires 1959, he scored 8.5/13 for fourth place, and was third at Quilmes 1959 with 6.5/11. At Mar del Plata 1959, he finished tied for eighth with 7/14. Then at Santiago 1959, he defeated American star Robert James Fischer, a future World Champion, and tied for fourth with 7.5/12. He tied for first at Bariloche 1960 with a powerful 7/9.

After a two-year break from top competition, he placed third at the 1962 Argentine Championship with 13.5/17, and tied for fourth at Mar del Plata 1962 with 8.5/15, behind visiting stars such as Lev Polugaevsky, Vasily Smyslov, and László Szabó. Playing for Argentina again at the Varna 1962 Olympiad, he enjoyed perhaps his greatest career performance, with another gold medal on board four, from a score of 13.5/16, helping his nation to a bronze medal team finish. In 1963, he won the Buenos Aires Club Argentino event with 9/11, and the next year, he was perfect at Punta del Este (Uruguay) to win there with 7/7.

== Career high rating ==
The website chessmetrics.com is a database of player ratings and results throughout chess history, and endeavours to place player strengths in historical context, while compensating for the different calculation methods which have been used, as well as retrospectively rating performances which occurred before the introduction of international ratings in 1970. By January 1965, Sanguineti had reached a chessmetrics rating of 2677, good for #18 in the world. He had performed at 2699 at Varna 1962. With a 2600 performance generally denoting grandmaster standard, it seemed quite clear that Sanguineti deserved a promotion to the higher title, based upon his consistently strong results in good calibre events.

At Buenos Aires 1965, Sanguineti scored 6.5/11 to end fourth, and he won the 1965 Argentine Championship with an impressive 16/21. Mar del Plata 1965 was again very strong, with Najdorf, Leonid Stein, and Yuri Averbakh in attendance, and Sanguineti could only manage eighth place with 8.5/15. The next year at Mar del Plata he scored 7.5/15 to finish tied seventh. For the Havana 1966 Olympiad, Sanguineti was again on board four for Argentina, and performed superbly with 11/15. Argentina finished fifth.

He cut back his play over the next couple of years. He won the Argentine Championship semi-final 'C' in 1968 with 5/7 at Mar del Plata. Then, in the Championship proper, he finished second, behind Najdorf, and defeated Samuel Schweber in a playoff match, 2.5-1.5. At the Buenos Aires Open of 1968, he tied for first with 7.5/9.

He was selected again for Argentina at the Lugano 1968 Olympiad, earning a promotion to board three, where he scored well with 11.5/16.

== Second wind, Grandmaster at last ==
After a break of three years from top-flight play, Sanguineti returned to action in 1971. He won the 1971 Villa Gesell Open with 4.5/6. The inaugural Pan American Team Chess Championship was held at Tucumán in 1971 and Argentina won easily, by eight points, with a monster score of 25.5/28, as all five team members won gold medal board prizes. Sanguineti scored 5.5/6. A team event at Villa Gesell saw him post an impressive 3.5/4.

He tied for fourth at the Zárate Open of 1973 with 6.5/9. Sanguineti claimed his second Argentine Championship title in 1973 at Santa Fe with a dominant 13.5/18, two points clear of the field. He defeated Roberto Luis Debarnot 2.5-0.5 in a playoff match.

He won the 1974 Argentine Championship with 13.5/16, for his third title. For the Nice 1974 Olympiad, he was on board two, and made 8/15. He travelled north to Canada for the 1974 Pan American Chess Championship in Winnipeg, where he came second with 12/15 behind American champion Walter Browne. An unexpected break to his streak of good play was the 1975 Buenos Aires CA tournament, where he could manage only 4.5/11. But he recovered quickly. He claimed the tournament title at the Fortaleza Zonal 1975 with 13/17, 1.5 points ahead of runner-up, countryman Miguel Quinteros. This qualified him again for the World Championship cycle. He was fourth at the 1975 Argentine Championship at Buenos Aires with 13.5/19. Then at Mar del Plata 1976, he tied for first with 11/15. In the same year he won also in Buenos Aires (Konex chess tournament).

These strong performances seemed to bode well for the 1976 Biel Interzonal, but, facing a field of 16 strong Grandmasters out of 19 opponents, including former World Champions Tigran Petrosian and Mikhail Tal, he scored a disappointing 8.5/19 for 16th place. Haifa 1976 marked his last Olympiad appearance for Argentina and he made 4.5/7 on board four.

At Buenos Aires 1977, he won the tournament with 8.5/10, ahead of both Najdorf and Oscar Panno. Then he tied for first at the small Buenos Aires YMCA event, with 4/7. At Santos Lugares 1977, he won with 8/11.

FIDE, the World Chess Federation, awarded him the Grandmaster title in 1982. He died in Buenos Aires at age 67.

== Notable chess games ==
- Alexander Kotov vs Raúl Sanguineti, Mar del Plata 1957, Queen's Indian Defence (E16), 0-1 A hard-fought win over a top touring Soviet GM.
- Raúl Sanguineti vs Hector Rossetto, Portorož Interzonal 1958, Ruy Lopez, Open Variation (C83), 1-0 Nifty 28-move victory over his countryman Rossetto.
- Raúl Sanguineti vs James Sherwin, Portorož Interzonal 1958, King's Indian Defence, Classical Variation (E90), 1-0 Black chooses an offbeat line to try to confuse the young Argentine, but to no avail.
- Raúl Sanguineti vs Istvan Bilek, Munich Olympiad 1958, Nimzo-Indian Defence, Rubinstein Variation (E43), 1-0 A nice precise win over a strong Hungarian GM.
- Raúl Sanguineti vs Robert James Fischer, Santiago 1959, King's Indian Defence, Saemisch Variation (E81), 1-0 Any win over a future World Champion is well worth studying.
