= Soledad Gonzalez de Huguet =

Argentine chess player (1934–2012)

Soledad González de Huguet
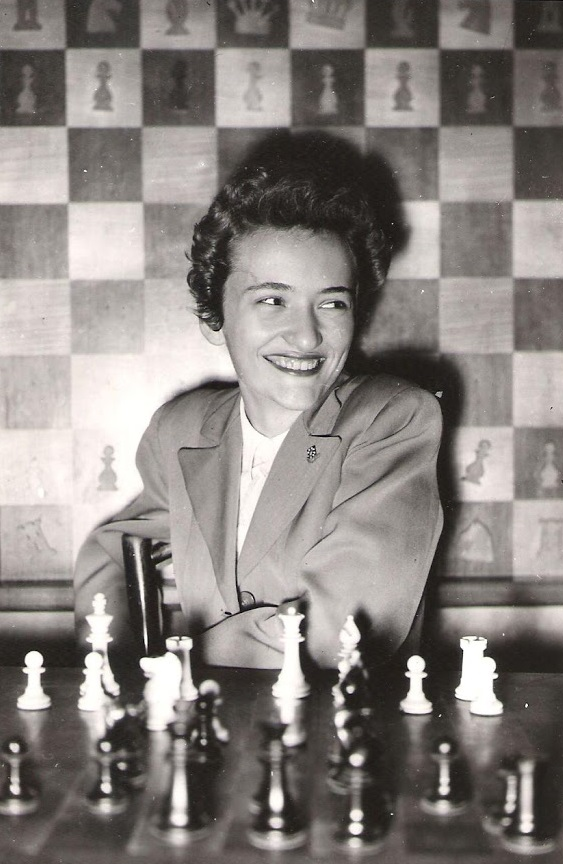
- Huguet in 1954

Personal information
- Born: Soledad González Pomes de Huguet; 24 September 1934 Madrid, Spain
- Died: December 2012 (aged 78)

Chess career
- Country: Argentina
- Title: Woman International Master (1957)

Soledad González Pomes de Huguet (24 September 1934 – December 2012) was an Argentine chess player who held the FIDE title of Woman International Master (WIM, 1957). She was a two-time winner of the Argentine Women's Chess Championship (1954, 1956).

== Biography ==
From the late 1950s to the early 1960s, de Huguet was one of the leading Argentine women's chess players. She twice won Argentine Women's Chess Championships: 1954 and 1956. In 1957, in Rio de Janeiro, de Huguet won Women's World Chess Championship South America Zonal Tournament and awarded the FIDE Woman International Master (WIM) title. In 1959, she participated in the Women's World Chess Championship Candidates Tournament in Plovdiv and ranked 15th place. In 1963, in Fortaleza, de Huguet ranked 3rd in Women's World Chess Championship South America Zonal Tournament. Huguet is deceased.
