= Gerardo Barbero =

Argentine chess grandmaster (1961–2001)

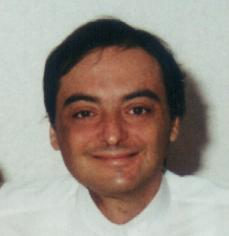
- Barbero in 2000

Personal information
- Born: Gerardo Fabián Barbero; 21 August 1961 Lanús, Buenos Aires Province, Argentina
- Died: 4 March 2001 (aged 39) Budapest, Hungary

Chess career
- Country: Argentina
- Title: Grandmaster (1987)
- Peak rating: 2520 (January 1986)

Gerardo Fabián Barbero (21 August 1961 – 4 March 2001) was an Argentine chess grandmaster. He was born in Lanús, Buenos Aires, and raised in Rosario, Santa Fe.

Barbero came fifth in the World Junior Chess Championship of 1978. He was Argentine champion in 1984 and played on board one for the Chess Olympiad team in 1990. He played six times for Argentina, between 1978 and 1994, at the Chess Olympiads. Barbero was awarded the title of Grandmaster in 1987.

In 1986, he moved to Budapest, Hungary, where he married Katalin Marietta Molnár and had a son. In Hungary, he developed a friendship with Bobby Fischer, who, according to GM Eugenio Torre, "liked Barbero". He died in Budapest of cancer in 2001.

The third chapter of Tibor Karolyi's 2009 book Genius in the Background is devoted to him.

== Sample game ==
Barbero had a win against Bent Larsen in Buenos Aires in 1991:

1.d4 Nf6 2.c4 e6 3.Nf3 d5 4.Nc3 c6 5.e3 Nbd7 6.Qc2 Be7 7.b3 a6 8.Bd3 b5 9.0-0 0-0 10.e4 b4 11.Na4 dxe4 12.Bxe4 Bb7 13.Bg5 Nxe4 14.Bxe7 Qxe7 15.Qxe4 Rab8 16.c5 a5 17.Rfe1 Rbd8 18.a3 Nf6 19.Qh4 Ba6 20.axb4 axb4 21.Nb6 Bb5 22.Qf4 Rb8 23.Ne5 Rfd8 24.Re3 Rb7 25.g4 Ra7 26.Rae1 Ne8 27.g5 f6 28.Nf3 Nc7 29.gxf6 gxf6 30.Nh4 Qf7 31.Kh1 Kh8 32.Rg1 Qf8 33.Ng6+ hxg6 34.Rh3+ 1–0

Barbero vs. Larsen, Buenos Aires 1991

Position: d8 black rook, f8 black queen, h8 black king, a7 black rook, c7 black knight, b6 white knight, c6 black pawn, e6 black pawn, f6 black pawn, g6 black pawn, b5 black bishop, c5 white pawn, b4 black pawn, d4 white pawn, f4 white queen, b3 white pawn, h3 white rook, f2 white pawn, h2 white pawn, g1 white rook, h1 white king

The position at black's resignation
