= Damian Reca =

Argentine chess player

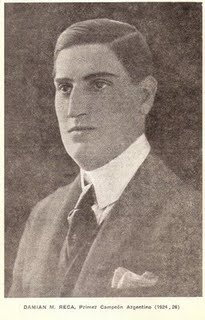
Damian Reca

Damián Miguel Reca (1894 – 4 May 1937 in Buenos Aires) was an Argentine chess master.

He was Argentine Champion in 1921, 1923, 1924, and 1925.

In 1921, he won at Buenos Aires (1st ARG-ch) and won a match for the title against Benito Villegas (5 : 2) in 1921/22. He took 7th at Montevideo (Carrasco) 1921/22 (1st Torneo Sudamericano, Roberto Grau won). He tied for 2nd-3rd at Buenos Aires 1922 (2nd ARG-ch, Villegas won). In 1923/24, he won at Buenos Aires (3rd ARG-ch) and won a match for the title against Villegas (5 : 3). In 1924 and 1925, he was declared Argentine champion without official matches (Reca lost a match against Richard Réti 0.5 : 2.5 at Buenos Aires 1924, and won an unofficial match against Julio Lynch 5.5 : 2.5 in 1925).

He tied for 8-13th in 1st unofficial Chess Olympiads at Paris 1924 (Consolation Cup, Karel Hromadka won). He tied for 2nd-3rd at Montevideo 1925 (2nd Torneo Sudamericano, Luis Palau won). In 1926, he lost a match for the title (6th ARG-ch) to Grau (3 : 5). He won at Buenos Aires 1927 (7th ARG-ch) but did not win the title because he refused to play with Grau. He also won at Buenos Aires 1927 (Pentagonal).

Reca represented Argentina in 2nd Chess Olympiad at The Hague 1928 (+4 –5 =4).
