= Jaime Emma =

Argentine journalist, lawyer and chess player

Jaime Emma (17 January 1938 – 8 January 2005) was an Argentine journalist, lawyer and chess player. A native of Buenos Aires, he won the Argentine Chess Championship in 1978, the same year he won the title of International Master.

Emma was married to María del Carmen Di Pietro and had two children: Pablo Andrés Rodríguez and Mariana Tierno.
