= Markas Luckis =

Lithuanian–Argentine chess player (1905–1973)

Markas (Marcos) Luckis (17 January 1905, in Pskov – 9 February 1973, in Buenos Aires) was a Lithuanian–Argentine chess master.

== Biography ==
Luckis twice won the Kaunas City Chess Championship in 1927 and 1928.

Markas Luckis played for Lithuania in five official and one unofficial Chess Olympiads.

- In July 1931, on reserve board at 4th Chess Olympiad in Prague (+5 –4 =6);
- In July 1933, on fourth board at 5th Chess Olympiad in Folkestone (+3 –4 =1);
- In August 1935, on reserve board at 6th Chess Olympiad in Warsaw (+8 –2 =6);
- In August/September 1936, on fourth board at 3rd unofficial Chess Olympiad in Munich (+9 –2 =9);
- In July/August 1937, on fourth board at 7th Chess Olympiad in Stockholm (+7 –1 =9);
- In August/September 1939, on third board at 8th Chess Olympiad in Buenos Aires (+7 –8 =5).

Luckis won three individual medals: one silver in 1936, and two bronze in 1935 and 1937.

In September 1939, when World War II broke out, Luckis, along with many other participants of the 8th Chess Olympiad, decided to stay permanently in Argentina.

In October 1939, he took 8th at Buenos Aires (Círculo de Ajedrez). The event was won by Miguel Najdorf and Paul Keres. In 1941, he took 5th at Sao Pedro de Piracicaba. The event was won by Erich Eliskases and Carlos Guimard. In 1941, he took 2nd, behind Eliskases, at Montevideo.

Marcos Luckis played several times in international tournaments at Mar del Plata. In 1942, he tied for 6-7th. In 1946, he tied for 5-8th. In 1947, he took 16th. In 1948, he tied for 10-12th. In 1949, he took 5th. In 1950, he took 17th. In 1952, he tied for 11-13 th. In 1962, he tied for 7-8th.

He also played in Argentine championships at Buenos Aires. In 1941, he finished 1st, but he could not win the title as a then-foreign player (Lithuanian citizen). In 1947, he took 2nd, behind Héctor Rossetto. In 1961, he took 2nd, again behind Rossetto. In 1963, he tied for 8-9th (Raimundo García won). In 1965, he tied for 10-11th (Raúl Sanguineti won).

In 1951, Luckis tied for 14-16th at Mar del Plata/Buenos Aires (1st zonal tournament for South America). In 1966, he tied for 11-13th at Buenos Aires/Río Hondo (zt).

== Notable chess games ==
- Markas Luckis vs Karel Skalička (CSR), Prague 1931, 4th Olympiad, Queen’s Gambit Declined, Classical, D61, 1-0
- Markas Luckis vs Arthur MacKenzie (SCO), Folkestone 1933, 5th Olympiad, King's Indian, Fianchetto, E67, 1-0
- Markas Luckis vs Moshe Czerniak (Palestine), Warsaw 1935, 6th Olympiad, Slav Defence, D11, 1-0
- Markas Luckis vs Victor Kahn (FRA), Buenos Aires 1939, 8th Olympiad, Queen’s Gambit Declined, Semi-Tarrasch, D41, 1-0
- Mieczysław (Miguel) Najdorf vs Markas (Marcos) Luckis, Buenos Aires(Círculo de Ajedrez) 1939, Sicilian, Dragon, B72, 0-1
- Marcos Luckis vs Hector Rossetto, Montevideo 1941, Grünfeld, Russian Variation, D96, 1-0
- Marcos Luckis vs Gideon Stahlberg, Mar del Plata 1944, Sicilian, Scheveningen, B84, 1-0
- Marcos Luckis vs Donald Byrne, La Plata–New York radio match 1947, King’s Indian, Classical, E94, 1-0
- Francisco Benko vs Marcos Luckis, Buenos Aires 1961, ARG-ch, Caro-Kann, Panov Attack, B14, 0-1
- Alberto Foguelman vs Marcos Luckis, Buenos Aires 1965, ARG-ch, Catalan, Closed, E09, 0-1
