= Celia Baudot de Moschini =

Personal information
- Full name: Celia Teresa Baudot de Moschini
- Born: 5 October 1910
- Died: 7 June 2006 (aged 95)

Chess career
- Country: Argentina
- Title: Woman International Master (1954)

Celia Baudot de Moschini (1910 – 2006) was an Argentine chess player who held the title of Woman International Master (WIM, 1954). She was a six-time winner of the Argentine Women's Chess Championship (1953, 1957, 1958, 1962, 1963, 1968).

== Biography ==
From the 1950s to the 1960s, Moschini was one of the leading Argentine women's chess players. She six times won the Argentine women's chess championships: 1953, 1957, 1958, 1962, 1963 and 1968. In 1954, she won Women's World Chess Championship South America Zonal Tournament and was awarded the FIDE Woman International Master (WIM) title. In 1963, in Fortaleza Celia Baudot de Moschini second time won South America Zonal Tournament.

Moschini two times participated in the Women's World Chess Championship Candidates Tournaments:

- In 1955, at Candidates Tournament in Moscow and ranked 18th place;
- In 1964, at Candidates Tournament in Sukhumi and ranked 19th place.
