= Carlos Eleodoro Juárez =

Argentine chess player (born 1938)

Personal information
- Born: 29 June 1938 (age 88)

Chess career
- Country: Argentina
- Peak rating: 2410 (July 1986)

Carlos Eleodoro Juárez (born 29 June 1938), is an Argentine chess player, Argentine Chess Championship winner (1969).

== Biography ==
Carlos Eleodoro Juárez participated in the Argentine Chess Championship finals, achieving his best result in 1969 by sharing second place with Raimundo García and winning an additional match 2½–½. In the 1971 Argentine Championship he shared 2nd–3rd place.

Carlos Eleodoro Juárez played for Argentina in the Chess Olympiad:

- In 1970, at second reserve board in the 19th Chess Olympiad in Siegen (+1, =1, -1).

Carlos Eleodoro Juárez was participant of the Zonal Chess Tournament in 1972, Pan American Chess Championships and major international chess tournaments held in South America.
