= Edith Soppe =

Argentine chess player (1961–2005)

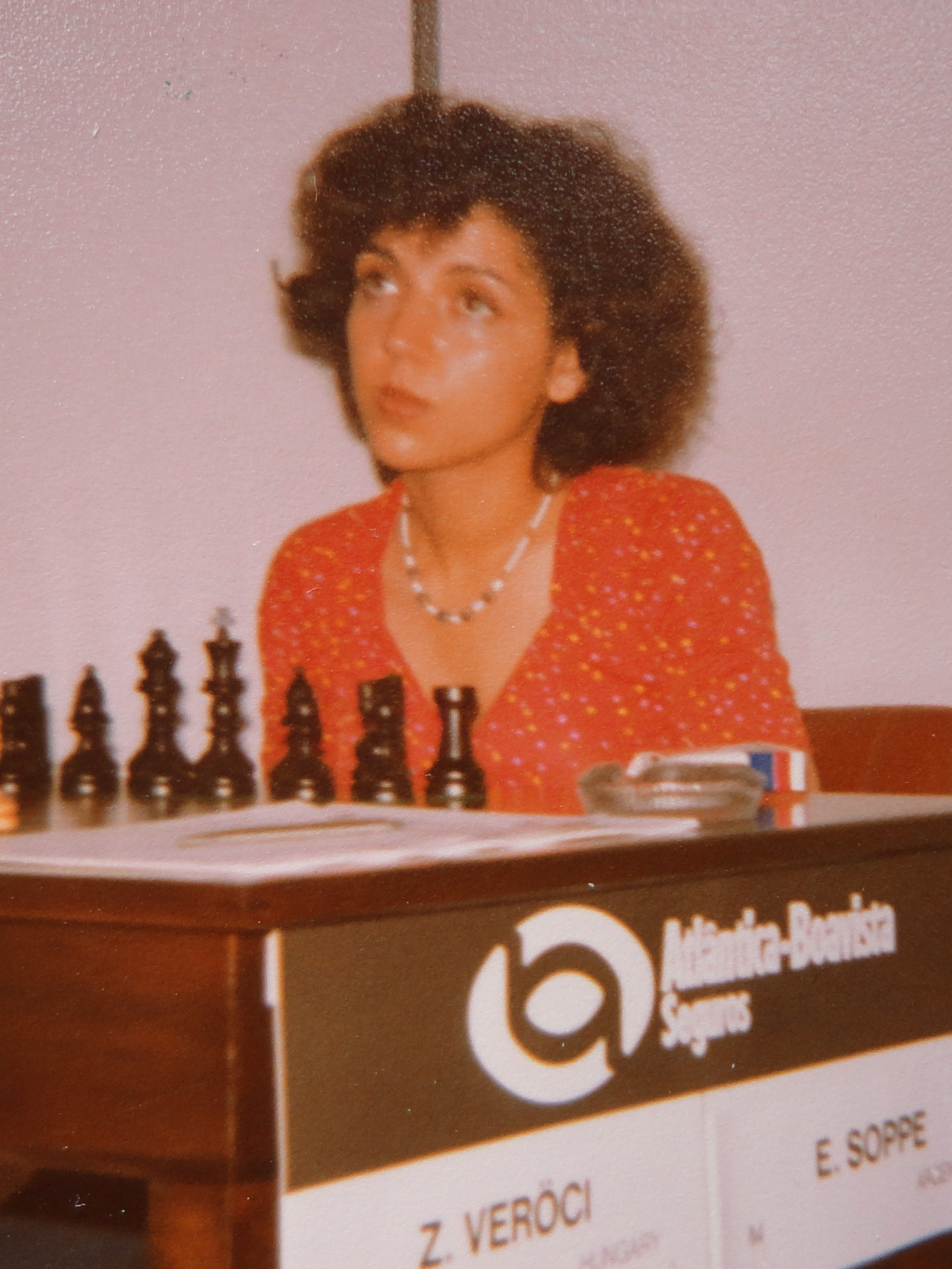
- Soppe in Rio de Janeiro, 1979

Personal information
- Born: 10 August 1961
- Died: 22 November 2005 (aged 44)

Chess career
- Country: Argentina
- Title: Woman International Master (1978)
- Peak rating: 2105 (July 1987)

Edith Soppe (10 August 1961 – 22 November 2005) was an Argentine chess player. She received the FIDE title of Woman International Master (WIM) in 1978 and was a three-time winner of the Argentine Women's Chess Championship (1979, 1980, 1981).

== Biography ==
From the late 1970s to the early 1980s, Soppe was one of the leading Argentine women's chess players. She three time in row won Argentine Women's Chess Championships: 1979, 1980 and 1981. In 1978, she shared the first place with Berna Carrasco in FIDE South America Zonal Tournament and was awarded the FIDE Woman International Master (WIM) title. In 1979, in Rio de Janeiro, Soppe participated at Interzonal Tournament and ranked 15th place.

Soppe played for Argentina in the Women's Chess Olympiads:

- In 1976, at second board in the 7th Chess Olympiad (women) in Haifa (+3, =3, -3),
- In 1978, at first board in the 8th Chess Olympiad (women) in Buenos Aires (+6, =1, -6),
- In 1980, at first board in the 9th Chess Olympiad (women) in Valletta (+4, =9, -0),
- In 1982, at first board in the 10th Chess Olympiad (women) in Lucerne (+6, =4, -3).

She left the tournaments to dedicate herself to her family and had two children. She also stood out as a teacher and leader. In the Luz y Fuerza School she formed a large number of chess players (among them two champions of Córdoba). She had an outstanding participation in the creation of the Chess Association of the Córdoba Province (AACC).

She died on 22 November 2005, at the age of 44.

Since 2012, chess tournaments have been played in Soppe's memory.
