= Jacobo Bolbochán =

Argentine chess player (1906–1984)

Jacobo Bolbochán (26 December 1906 – 29 July 1984) was an Argentine chess master.

He played many times in the Argentine Chess Championships. He won twice (1931 and 1932), both ahead of Isaías Pleci. In 1933, he took 2nd, behind Luis Piazzini. In 1935, he took 2nd, behind Roberto Grau. In 1936, he took 3rd, behind Carlos Guimard and Grau. In 1937, he took 2nd, behind Guimard.

He played for Argentina in three Chess Olympiads.

- In 1935, at second board in the 6th Chess Olympiad in Warsaw (+6 –1 =12);
- In 1937, at second board in the 7th Chess Olympiad in Stockholm (+2 –5 =5);
- In 1939, at third board in the 8th Chess Olympiad in Buenos Aires (+10 –3 =6).

He won two individual bronze medals at Warsaw 1935 and at Buenos Aires 1939.

In 1945, Jacobo Bolbochán took 3rd, behind Hermann Pilnik, and Héctor Rossetto. In 1946, he tied for 2nd-3rd with Carlos Maderna, behind Julio Bolbochán. In 1950, he took 2nd, behind Maderna. In 1952, he tied for 3rd-4th with Guimard, behind Miguel Najdorf, and Rubén Shocrón.

Jacobo Bolbochán became an International Master (IM) in 1965 at the age of 59. Jacobo is the elder brother of Julio Bolbochán.
