= Diego Flores (chess player) =

Argentine chess grandmaster (born 1982)

- Flores at the 2026 Chess Olympiad

Personal information
- Born: 18 December 1982 (age 43) Las Palmas de Gran Canaria, Spain

Chess career
- Country: Argentina
- Title: Grandmaster (2008)
- FIDE rating: 2558 (November 2026)
- Peak rating: 2634 (November 2018)

Diego Flores (born 18 December 1982) is an Argentine chess player who received the FIDE title of Grandmaster (GM) in 2008. He is a five-time Argentine Chess Champion.

== Chess career ==
He competed in the FIDE World Cup in 2005, 2007, 2009, 2013 and 2017. Flores won the Argentine Chess Championships of 2005, 2009, 2012 2016, and 2017. Flores has played for the Argentine national team in the Chess Olympiad, the Pan-American Team Chess Championship and the Mercosur Chess Olympiad.

In 2010 he won the 2nd Magistral Marcel Duchamp round-robin tournament in Buenos Aires, edging out Sandro Mareco on tiebreak. In the same year Flores was granted the Konex Award Merit Diploma as one of the top five chess players of the decade in Argentina. In 2011, he tied for 1st–2nd place with Alexandr Fier in the 2nd Latin American Cup in Montevideo, finishing second on tiebreak. The following year Flores tied for first place in the American Continental Championship, held in Mar del Plata, with Julio Granda Zuñiga, Alexander Shabalov, Gregory Kaidanov and Eric Hansen.

He is also the chess columnist in Junín's daily Diario Democracia since 2004.
