= Miguel Quinteros =

Argentine chess grandmaster (born 1947)

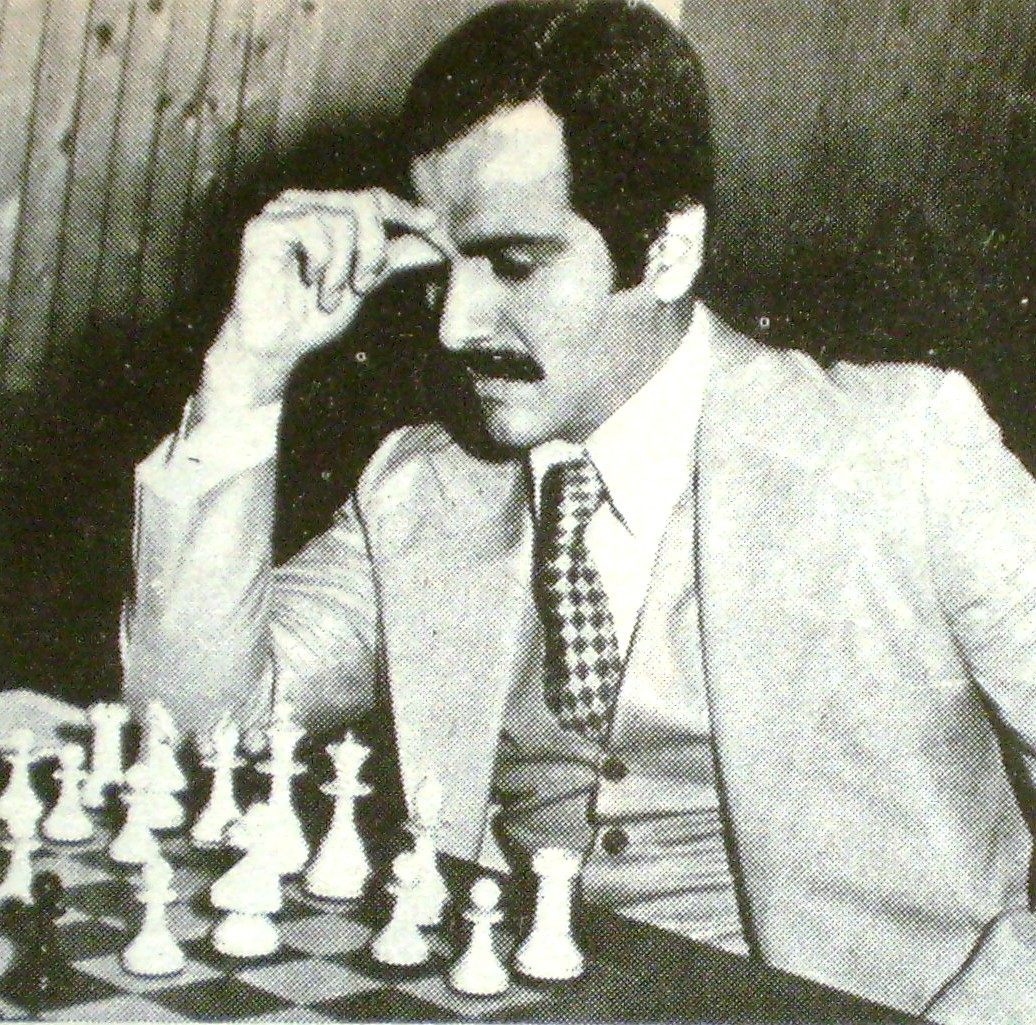
- Quinteros in 1980

Personal information
- Born: Miguel Ángel Quinteros; 28 December 1947 (age 78) Buenos Aires, Argentina

Chess career
- Country: Argentina
- Title: Grandmaster (1973)
- FIDE rating: 2422 (October 2026)
- Peak rating: 2555 (January 1977)
- Peak ranking: No. 30 (January 1977)

Miguel Ángel Quinteros (born 28 December 1947, in Buenos Aires) is an Argentine chess player who received the FIDE title of Grandmaster (GM) in 1973.

== Chess career ==
He won the Argentine Chess Championship in 1966 at the age of 18, the youngest player to ever win that event. In 1969, he took eighth place at the Mar del Plata Zonal tournament (ZT). In 1972, he tied for second/third place at the São Paulo ZT, earning him a place at the Interzonal tournament in Leningrad the following year and finishing 11–12th. At Torremolinos 1973, he tied for first place with Pal Benko. The same year at Bauang, he tied for second place (+6 −2 =1) after Lubomir Kavalek. He finished first (+6 −1 =6) at Lanzarote 1974. In 1975 at Orense, he tied for fourth (+7 −2 =6), and took second place at the Fortaleza ZT and qualified for the 1976 Manila Interzonal, where he managed only 14th place. He shared second place (+4 −1 =4) at London 1977. He won (+10 −1 =4) at Morón 1982, took second place (+5 −1 =5) at New York 1983, and won at Netanya 1983.

Quinteros played for Argentina six times in the Chess Olympiads of 1970, 1974, 1976, 1980, 1982 and 1984. He won an individual silver medal for his third-board performance at Haifa in 1976.

In 1987, he was barred from playing in FIDE events for three years for playing in South Africa in defiance of FIDE sanctions. Quinteros was the first grandmaster to visit South Africa since 1981 and he gave simultaneous exhibitions in Cape Town, Sun City and Johannesburg.

Quinteros was awarded the International Master (IM) title in 1970, and the GM title in 1973. He won the Konex Award in 1980 as one of the five best chess players of the decade in his country, and the Platinum Konex Award in 1990 as the most important chess player of the decade.

Quinteros is married to Benjie, a former Filipina model whom he met at the 1976 Manila Interzonal. Eugenio Torre was his best man at the wedding.

== Quinteros Variation ==
The rare Sicilian Defence line 1.e4 c5 2.Nf3 Qc7 is sometimes known as the Quinteros Variation, after it was introduced into first-class play by Quinteros against Henrique Mecking in 1971. Tony Miles used the variation to defeat Genna Sosonko in their game from the Tilburg 1984 tournament. It began 1 c4 e5 2 Qc2!?
