= Mar del Plata chess tournament =

Mar del Plata, Argentina, has a rich history of chess tournaments, including their international chess tournament and open tournament. There is also an annual city tournament, which had its first edition in 1946, and reached its 62nd edition in 2007.

The international tournament started off in 1928, but only in the period from 1941 to 1970 was it a truly international tournament with considerable reputation. After 1970, only seven international tournaments have been played. The 1951, 1954, 1969 and 2001 editions were zonal tournaments. There was also a zonal tournament for women in Mar del Plata, in 1969, won by the Brazilian Ruth Cardoso. Silvia Kot from Argentina placed second.

In 1967 the first edition of the open tournament was organized. In 1969 it became an annual event.

The Mar del Plata Variation of the King's Indian Defence (1. d4 Nf6 2. c4 g6 3. Nc3 Bg7 4. e4 d6 5. Nf3 0–0 6. Be2 e5 7. 0–0 Nc6 8. d5 Ne7) is named after a game played in 1953 at the 16th international tournament between Miguel Najdorf and Svetozar Gligorić.

== Mar del Plata International Chess Tournament ==
#	Year	Winner
1	1928	Roberto Grau (Argentina)
2	1934	Aaron Schwartzman (Argentina)
3	1936	Isaías Pleci (Argentina)
4	1941	Gideon Ståhlberg (Sweden)
5	1942	Miguel Najdorf (Argentina)
6	1943	Miguel Najdorf (Argentina)
7	1944	Hermann Pilnik (Argentina); Miguel Najdorf (Argentina)
8	1945	Miguel Najdorf (Argentina)
9	1946	Miguel Najdorf (Argentina)
10	1947	Miguel Najdorf (Argentina)
11	1948	Erich Eliskases (Argentina)
12	1949	Héctor Rossetto (Argentina)
13	1950	Svetozar Gligorić (Yugoslavia)
14	1951	Julio Bolbochán (Argentina); Erich Eliskases (Argentina)
15	1952	Héctor Rossetto (Argentina); Julio Bolbochán (Argentina)
16	1953	Svetozar Gligorić (Yugoslavia)
17	1954	Oscar Panno (Argentina)
18	1955	Borislav Ivkov (Yugoslavia)
19	1956	Julio Bolbochán (Argentina); Miguel Najdorf (Argentina)
20	1957	Paul Keres (Soviet Union)
21	1958	Bent Larsen (Denmark)
22	1959	Luděk Pachman (Czechoslovakia); Miguel Najdorf (Argentina)
23	1960	Boris Spassky (Soviet Union); Robert Fischer (United States)
24	1961	Miguel Najdorf (Argentina)
25	1962	Lev Polugaevsky (Soviet Union)
26	1964	Héctor Rossetto (Argentina)
27	1965	Miguel Najdorf (Argentina)
28	1966	Vasily Smyslov (Soviet Union)
29	1969	Oscar Panno (Argentina); Miguel Najdorf (Argentina)
30	1971	Lev Polugaevsky (Soviet Union)
31	1976	Raúl Sanguinetti (Argentina); Victor Brond (Argentina)
32	1982	Jan Timman (Netherlands)
33	1989	Marcelo Tempone (Argentina)
34	1990	Marino Alejandro Cid (Argentina)
35	1997	Fernando Braga (Italy)
36	2001	Juan Facundo Pierrot (Argentina); Rubén Felgaer (Argentina)

The 55th edition of the Mar del Plata Open Chess Tournament was held from 28 March to 4 April 2026 at the Casino Central in Mar del Plata. Grandmaster Vitalii Kiselev won the tournament after finishing tied on points and prevailing on tiebreak criteria.

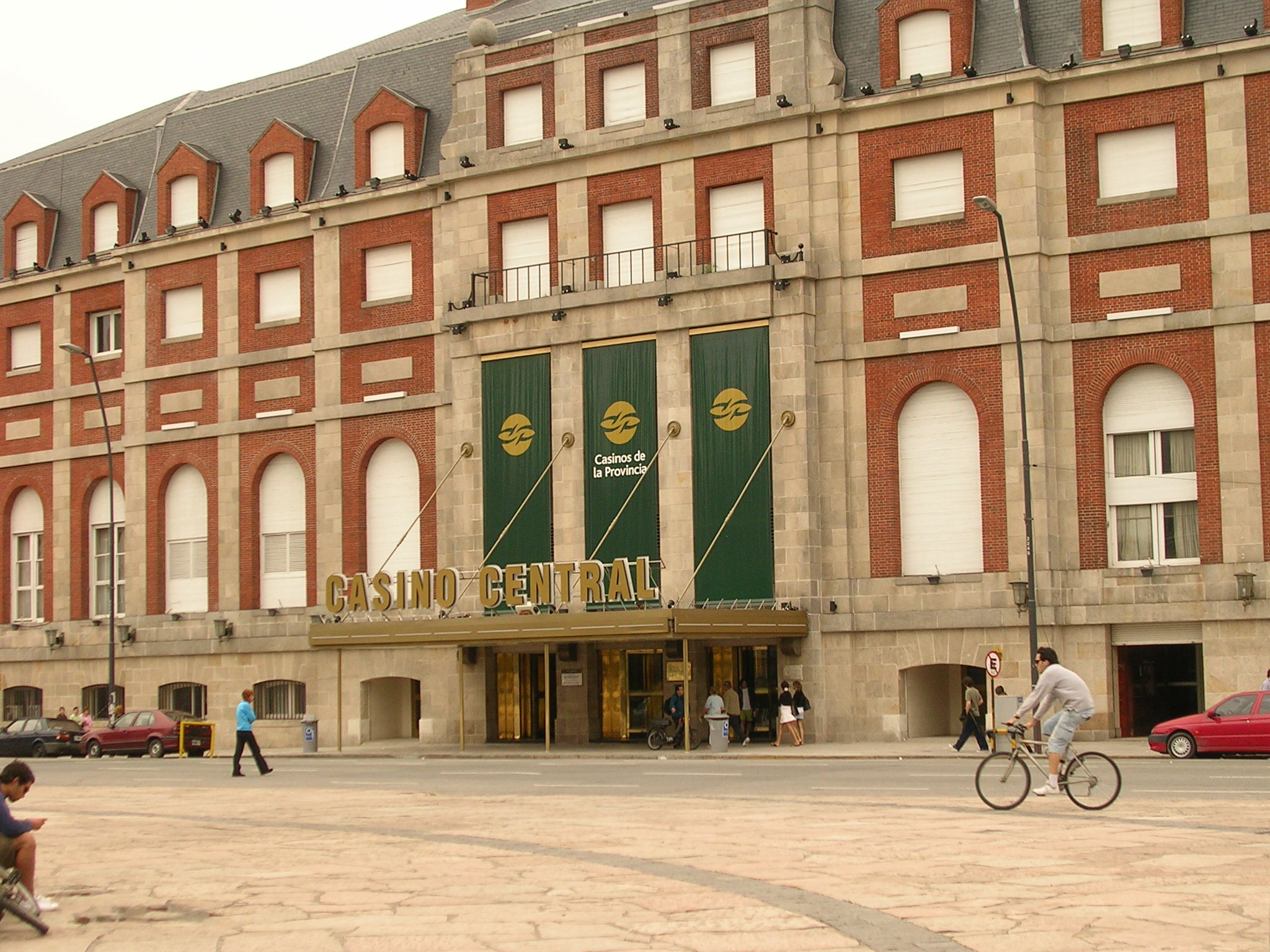
Casino Central of Mar del Plata, venue of the 2026 Mar del Plata Open Chess Tournament

== Mar del Plata Open Chess Tournament ==
#	Year	Winner
1	1967	Miguel Najdorf (Argentina)
2	1969	René Letelier (Chile)
3	1970	Lothar Schmid (Germany)
4	1971	Raúl Ocampo (Argentina)
5	1972	Jorge Rubinetti (Argentina)
6	1973	Lothar Schmid (Germany)
7	1974	Miguel Najdorf (Argentina)
8	1975	Jaime Emma (Argentina)
9	1976	Aldo Emilio Seidler (Argentina)
10	1977	Ricardo Poleschi (Argentina)
11	1978	Aldo Emilio Seidler (Argentina)
12	1979	Miguel Najdorf (Argentina)
13	1980	Carlos Lago (Argentina)
14	1983	Luis Marcos Bronstein (Argentina)
15	1984	Marcelo Tempone (Argentina)
16	1985	Jorge Rubinetti (Argentina)
17	1986	Oscar Panno (Argentina)
18	1987	Roberto Cifuentes (Chile)
19	1988	Oscar Panno (Argentina)
20	1989	Pablo Zarnicki (Argentina)
21	1990	Roberto Cifuentes (Chile)
22	1991	Marcelo Tempone (Argentina)
23	1992	Sergio Carlos Giardelli (Argentina)
24	1993	Bent Larsen (Denmark); Julio Granda (Peru)
25	1994	Oscar Panno (Argentina)
26	1995	Sergio Slipak (Argentina)
27	1996	Fabian Fiorito (Argentina)
28	1997	Fernando Braga (Italy)
29	1998	Alfredo Giaccio (Argentina)
30	1999	Sergio Slipak (Argentina)
31	2000	Martín Labollita (Argentina)
32	2001	Sergio Slipak (Argentina)
33	2002	Fabián Fiorito (Argentina)
34	2003	Suat Atalık (Bosnia and Herzegovina)
35	2004	Pablo Lafuente (Argentina)
36	2005	José F. Cubas (Paraguay)
37	2006	Diego Flores (Argentina)
38	2007	Andrés Rodríguez (Uruguay)
50	2019	Diego Flores (Argentina)
52	2023	Diego Valerga (Argentina)
53	2024	Johan-Sebastian Christiansen (Norway)
54	2025	Leonardo Tristán (Argentina)
55	2026	Vitalii Kiselev (Russia)
