= Jorge Rubinetti =

Argentinian international chess master

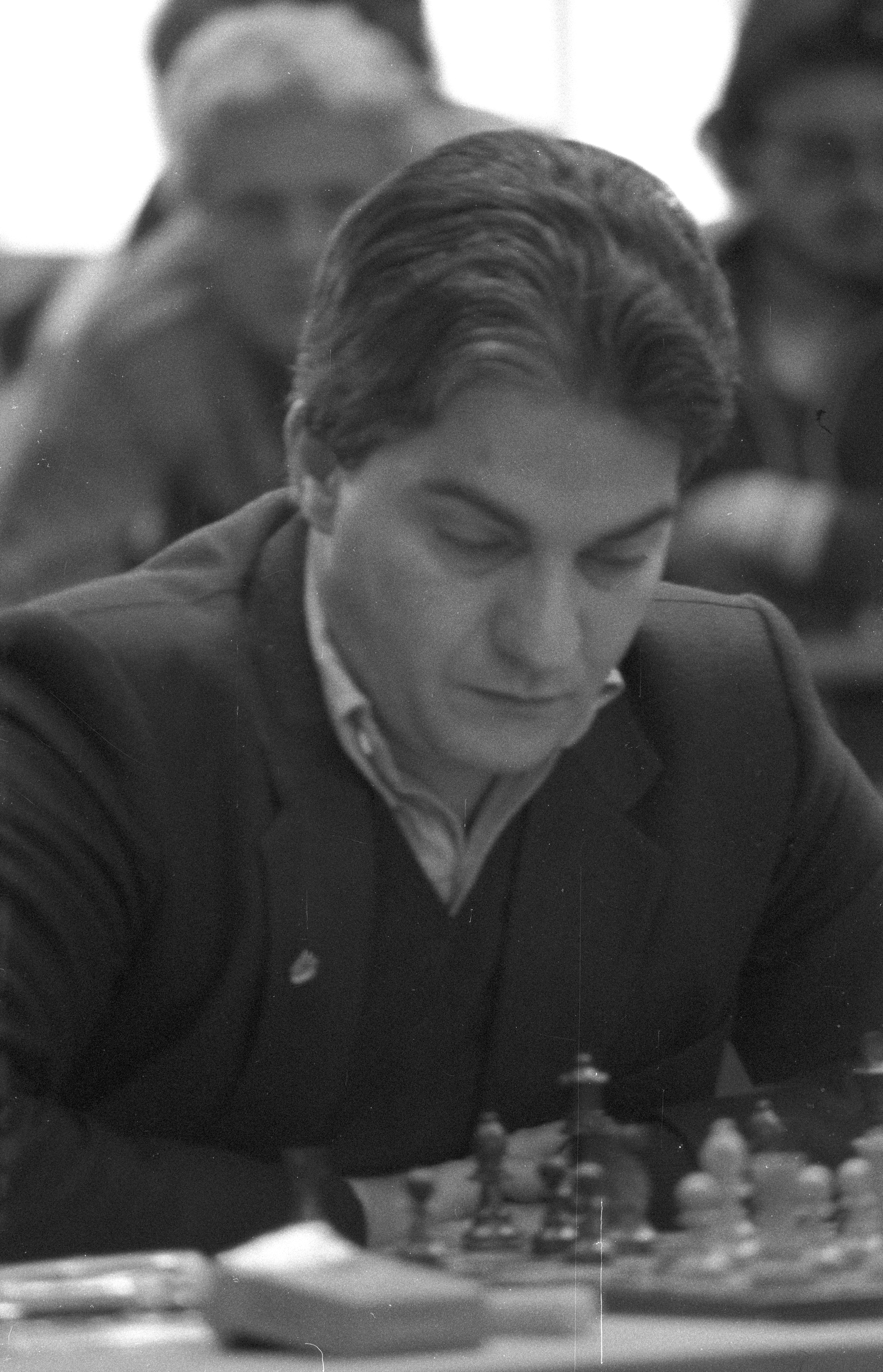
Jorge Rubinetti at the Chess Olympiad 1982 in Lucerne, Switzerland

Jorge Alberto Rubinetti (March 31, 1945 – September 19, 2016) was an Argentine international chess master. He won the Argentine Chess Championship four times and competed at eight Chess Olympiads. He also played in two Interzonals in 1970 and 1982.

== Career beginnings ==
Participated in the "World Championship of the Youth" in The Hague, Holland, in 1961. He was Argentine Champion "under 20" in 1962. He was "Metropolitan Champion" for the city of Buenos Aires in 1965. He was a four-time winner of the Absolute Argentine Chess Championship (Buenos Aires 1971, La Plata 1982 (five players tied for first place, but he won the playoff), Buenos Aires 1988, and Buenos Aires 1991).

He represented Argentina at eight Chess Olympiads: Lugano 1968, Siegen 1970, Skopje 1972, Nice 1974, Malta 1980, Luzern 1982, Thesalonika 1988 and Manila 1992. He also competed at the 1985 World Team Championship in Lucerne on board six, scoring 3.5/7.

In 1975, he won the First International Tournament "Atahualpa" held in Quito, Ecuador. Rubinetti participated in the Interzonals Tournaments of Palma de Mallorca in 1970 and Toluca, Mexico in 1982.

He was champion of "Circulo de Ajedrez de Villa del Parque", Buenos Aires, from 1967 to 1973. He won matches played against Alberto Foguelman 5.5 0.5 in 1965, vs. Hebert Perez 3.5 0.5 in 1971, and versus Bartolome Marcussi 3.5 0.5 in 1973. He resigned his title without playing. He won also matches played against Borg 2 0 in the match Argentina-Chile, played in Mendoza 1971, versus Francisco Trois (2.5 1.5) at Porto Alegre 1976, vs Enrique Almada 2.5 1.5 in Montevideo, Uruguay, 1989 and 2 1 vs. IM Juan C Hase in Moron, Province of Buenos Aires, 1982. FIDE awarded the International Master title in 1969 at Mar del Plata Zonal.

Rubinetti also won at the Open Libertador Gral San Martín, Buenos Aires 1971, Mar del Plata Open 1971, Zárate Open 1972, Open Mercedes (R.O. Uruguay) 1975, International Aguadilla (Puerto Rico) 1988, Open São Paulo 1972(Brazil), Open Mar del Plata 1985 and Open "Villa Carlos Paz", Cordoba, Argentina, 1985.

He received the "Olimpia de Plata" in 1988 (Prize awarded by "Circulo de Periodistas Deportivos" each year for the best player in each discipline). He obtained a FIDE grandmaster norm in 1991.

He has been a chess professor at the Jockey Club of Buenos Aires since September 1993.
