= Luis Piazzini =

Argentine chess player (1905–1980)

Luis Roberto Piazzini (11 May 1905 – 4 March 1980) was an Argentine chess master.

He participated many times in Argentine championships, and was an Argentine Champion in 1933 winning ARG-ch Torneo Mayor and a match for the title against Jacobo Bolbochán (5.5 : 2.5). In 1934/35, he lost a match to Roberto Grau (5.5 : 7.5), lost a match to Carlos Guimard (2.5 : 7.5) in 1938, and lost a match to Carlos Maderna (6 : 8) in 1940.

In 1934, he tied for 7-8th in Mar del Plata International Chess Tournament (Aaron Schwartzman won). In 1934/35, he won South American Chess Championship in Buenos Aires. In 1936, he tied for 9-10th in Mar del Plata (it, Isaías Pleci won). In 1944, he took 4th in Buenos Aires (La Regence). In 1952, he won the Club Argentino de Ajedrez Championship in Buenos Aires. In 1959, he took 8th in Quilmes (Alberto Foguelman won).

Piazzini played twice for Argentina in Chess Olympiads:

- In 1937, at first board in 7th Chess Olympiad in Stockholm (+4 –2 =6);
- In 1939, at second board in 8th Chess Olympiad in Buenos Aires (+4 –3 =4).
