= Isaías Pleci =

Argentine chess player (1907–1979)

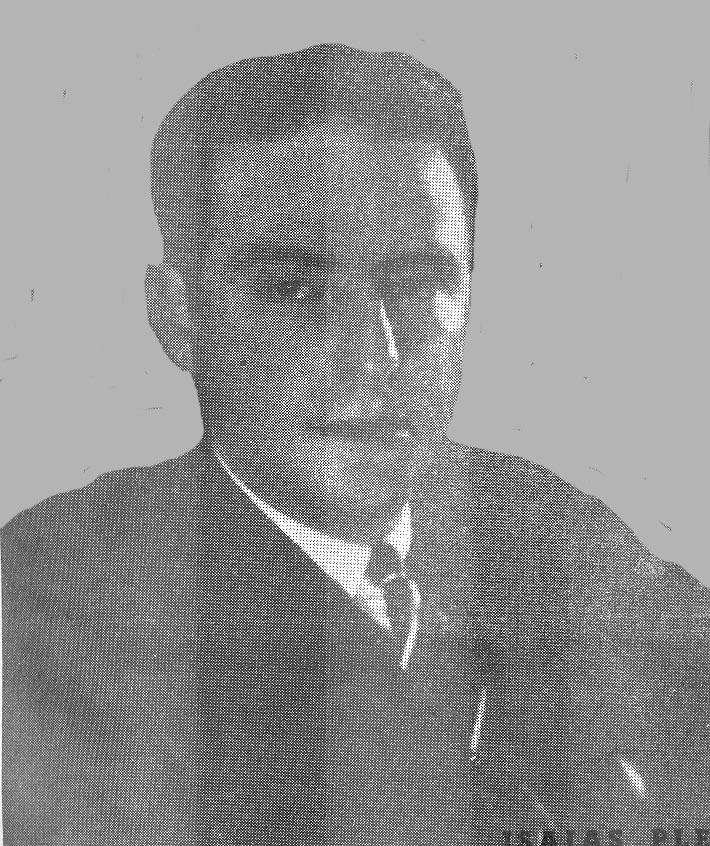
- Isaías Pleci

Personal information
- Born: 27 October 1907
- Died: 27 December 1979 (aged 79)

Chess career
- Country: Argentina
- Title: International Master
- World Champion: Argentine Champion

Isaías Pleci (also Isaías Pléci) (27 October 1907 – 27 December 1979) was an Argentine chess master.

== Chess tournaments ==
Pléci was the Argentine Champion in 1929 to 1930. He won at Buenos Aires 1928 (ARG-ch 7 Mayor) and lost a match for the title to Roberto Grau (0 : 4). later, he won in 1929 (ARG-ch 8) and won a match against Grau (5 : 3) in 1930. He won a match against Virgilio Fenoglio (6 : 4) in 1931. He lost a match to Jacobo Bolbochán (3 : 6) in 1931. He won ARG-ch 11 Mayor in 1932 and lost a match to Bolbochán (1,5 : 5,5) in 1933. He took second, behind Grau, in ARG-ch 13 Mayor in 1934. He took second, behind Bolbochán, in ARG-ch 14 Mayor in 1935. He tied for 3rd-5th in ARG-ch 15 Mayor in 1936 (Carlos Guimard won). He took 3rd in ARG-ch 16 Mayor in 1937 (Bolbochán won). In 1953, he tied for tenth in ARG-ch; Oscar Panno won.

In other tournaments, Pléci tied for first with Bolbochán and Fenoglio at Buenos Aires 1930. He took second, behind Victor Soultanbeieff, at Liege 1930 (Quadrangular) and took twelfth at Liege 1930 (Savielly Tartakower won). In 1934/35, he took second, behind Luis Piazzini, in Buenos Aires (the 5th South American Chess Championship). In 1936, he won, ahead of Aaron Schwartzman, in the 3rd Torneo Internacional de Mar del Plata (the 6th Campeonato Sudamericano).

Pléci represented Argentina in three Chess Olympiads.

- In 1935, at third board in the 6th Olympiad in Warsaw (+9 –4 =6);
- In 1937, at first reserve board in the 7th Olympiad in Stockholm (+11 –0 =6);
- In 1939, at first reserve board in the 8th Olympiad in Buenos Aires (+14 –3 =2).

He won the individual gold medal at Buenos Aires 1939 and the bronze medal at Stockholm 1937. In the 1939 Olympiad, he played the following brilliancy against Lucius Endzelins of Latvia. Alekhine wrote in 107 Great Chess Battles of Pleci's 11. Rd8!!: "A truly brilliant conception which makes this a pearl from the Buenos Aires tournament.":

- 1. e4 e6 2. d4 d5 3. Nd2 c5 4. Ngf3 dxe4 5. Nxe4 Nd7?! 6. dxc5 Nxc5 ( 6... Bxc5 7. Nxc5 Qa5+! 8. c3 Qxc5 9. Be3 Qc7 ) 7. Qxd8+ Kxd8 8. Bg5+! f6 9. O-O-O+ Ke8 (9... Kc7 10. Nxc5 Bxc5 11. Bf4+) 10. Bb5+ Kf7 (10... Bd7 11. Nxc5 Bxb5 12. Nxe6) 11. Rd8!! Be7! (11... fxg5 12. Ne5+ Ke7 13. Re8#; 11... Nxe4 12. Ne5+! Ke7 (12... fxe5 13. Be8#) 13. Re8+ Kd6 14. Nf7+ Kc5 15. Rxf8 Nxg5 16. Nxh8) 12. Ne5+!! fxe5 13. Nd6+!! Kg6 ( 13... Bxd6 14. Be8+ Kf8 15. Bg6# ) 14. Bxe7 Nxe7 15. Rxh8 a6 16. Be2 e4 17. f4 b5 18. Re8! Kf6 19. Rf8+ Kg6 20. h4! Bb7 21. h5+

He was awarded the International Master (IM) title in 1965.

== See also ==
- List of Jewish chess players
