= Pablo Ricardi =

Argentine chess grandmaster (born 1962)

Personal information
- Born: 25 February 1962 (age 64) Buenos Aires, Argentina

Chess career
- Country: Argentina
- Title: Grandmaster (1985)
- FIDE rating: 2464 (July 2026)
- Peak rating: 2554 (January 2001)

Pablo Ricardi (born 25 February 1962) is an Argentine chess player who received the FIDE title of Grandmaster in 1985.

He won the Argentine Chess Championship five times (1994, 1995, 1996, 1998, and 1999), and was a sub-champion in 2005. He also won or shared first at La Paz 1987 (Pan American Chess Championship), Buenos Aires 1991 (Seventh International Konex Master Chess Open Tournament), Villa Gesell 1996, Buenos Aires 2003, and Santiago de Chile 2006.

Ricardi played eleven times for Argentina in Chess Olympiads, from 1984 to 2006. He twice represented Argentina in the Pan American Team Chess Championship, and won team gold medal at Villa Gesell 1985, team silver medal at Cascavel 1995, and two individual gold medals there.

Konex Foundation granted him the Platinum Konex Award in 2000 as the most important chess player of the decade.
