= Roberto Grau =

Argentine chess player (1900–1944)

Roberto Gabriel Grau
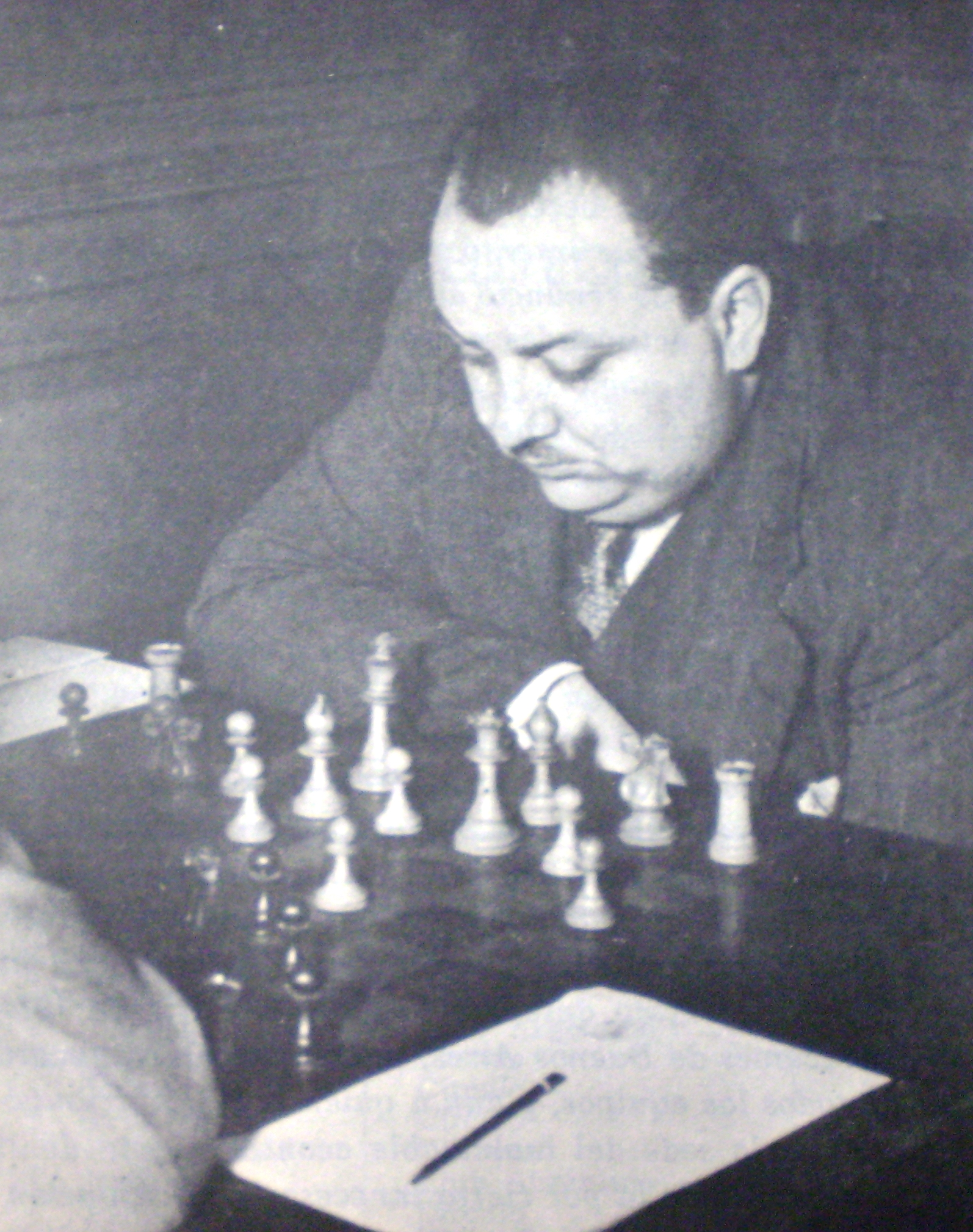
- Born: 18 March 1900; Argentina, Buenos Aires
- Died: 12 April 1944 (aged 44); Argentina, Buenos Aires
- Occupation: chess player
- Awards: Argentine Chess Championship

Roberto Gabriel Grau (18 March 1900 – 12 April 1944) was an Argentine chess master. He was born and died in Buenos Aires. In the late 1920s he was Argentina's strongest chess-player.

== Chess career ==
Grau played in many Argentine championships. In 1921/22, he tied for 3rd–4th (ARG-ch 1 Mayor; Damian Reca won). In 1922, he tied for 2nd–3rd (ARG-ch 2; Benito Villegas won). In 1923/24, he tied for 2nd–4th (ARG-ch 3; Reca won). In 1924, he took 2nd, behind Richard Réti (ARG-ch 4).

In 1926, he won in Buenos Aires (ARG-ch 5) and won a match for the title against Reca (6–2). He was also Argentine Champion in 1927 and 1928. He won a match against Isaías Pleci (4–0) in 1929, lost matches to Pleci (3–5) in 1930, and Carlos Guimard (2–6) in 1937. Grau won again Argentine championships in 1934 and a match against Luis Piazzini (7.5–5.5) in 1935 (ARG-ch 13), in 1935 and a match against Jacobo Bolbochán (5–3) in 1936 (ARG-ch 14), in 1938 and a match against Guimard (7.5–5.5) in 1939 (ARG-ch 17).

In tournaments, he won in 1921/22 at Montevideo (1st Torneo Sudamericano). In 1923, he won in Buenos Aires. In 1924, he took 2nd, behind Max Euwe, in Paris. In 1925, he tied for 2nd-3rd with Reca, behind Luis Palau, in Montevideo. In 1928, he won in Mar del Plata (1st it). In 1929, he won in Rosario. In 1930, he tied for 2nd-3rd in Buenos Aires (Virgilio Fenoglio won). In 1930, he took 5th in Buenos Aires (Bolbochán won). In 1930, he took 15th in San Remo (Alexander Alekhine won).

In 1934, he took 2nd, behind Aaron Schwartzman, in Mar del Plata. In 1934/35, he took 5th in Buenos Aires (Piazzini won). In 1938, he tied for 5-6th in Montevideo (Carrasco), an event won by Alekhine. In 1939, he took 4th, behind Fenoglio, Guimard and Julio Bolbochán, in Rio de Janeiro. In 1939, he took 7th in Buenos Aires (Miguel Najdorf and Paul Keres won).

Grau played for Argentina in Chess Olympiads.

- In 1924, at first board in 1st unofficial Chess Olympiad in Paris (W6 L3 D4);
- In 1927, at first board in 1st Chess Olympiad in London (W2 L3 D10);
- In 1928, at first reserve board in 2nd Chess Olympiad in The Hague (W6 L3 D7);
- In 1935, at first board in 6th Chess Olympiad in Warsaw (W6 L9 D4);
- In 1937, at third board in 7th Chess Olympiad in Stockholm (W8 L2 D5);
- In 1939, at first board in 8th Chess Olympiad in Buenos Aires (W1 L5 D4).

He was one of the original signatories in the formation of FIDE at Paris 1924 (1st unofficial Chess Olympiad).

He also wrote a four volume series on chess titled "Tratado General de Ajedrez" (General Treatise on Chess), first published in 1940.

The opening line 1. d4 d5 2. c4 Bf5 3. Qb3 e5 is called the Grau gambit.
