= Argentine Chess Championship =

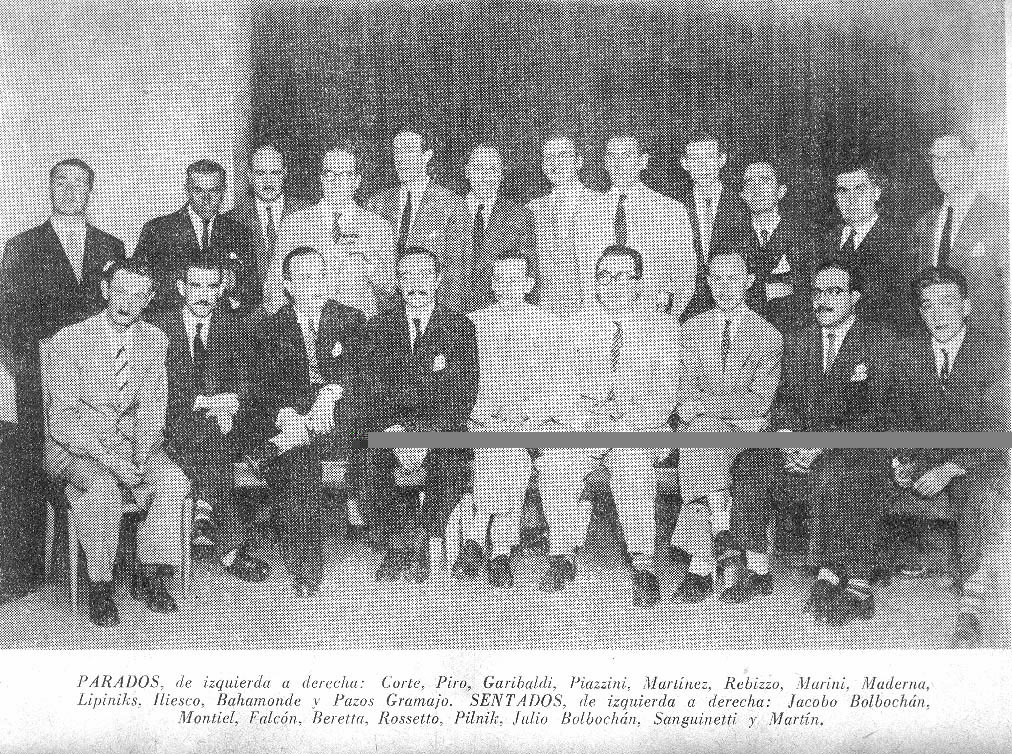
Participants of the 1946 Argentine Chess Championship

The first Argentine Chess Championship was held in 1921. The Champion's title was granted after victorious or drawn match between previous champion and challenger, a winner of Torneo Mayor (this or the next year). The matches were done away in 1950 year, for except 1952 year.

The Argentine Chess Championship is organized by the Argentine Chess Federation.

== Matches winners (1921–1953) ==
The results of the matches were as follows:

1921/22 Damian Reca – Benito Villegas 5 : 2

1922 Benito Villegas – Lizardo Molina Carranza 6.5 : 1.5 (extra-official match)

1924 Damián Reca – Benito Villegas 5 : 3

1924 Richard Réti (CSR) – Damián Reca 2.5 : 0.5 (non-official match)

1925 Damián Reca – Julio Lynch 5.5 : 2.5 (extra-official match)

1926 Roberto Grau – Damián Reca 5 : 3

1927/28 Damián Reca resigned to play a match for the title.

1929 Roberto Grau – Isaías Pleci 4 : 0

1930 Isaías Pléci – Roberto Grau 5 : 3

1931 Isaías Pléci – Virgilio Fenoglio 6 : 4

1931/32 Jacobo Bolbochán – Isaías Pléci 6 : 3

1932 Jacobo Bolbochán – Isaías Pléci 5.5 : 1.5

1933 Luis Piazzini – Jacobo Bolbochán 5.5 : 2.5

1934/35 Roberto Grau – Luis Piazzini 7.5 : 5.5

1935 Jacobo Bolbochán – Isaías Pléci 2.5 : 0.5 (play-off)

1936 Roberto Grau – Jacobo Bolbochán 5 : 3

1937 Carlos Guimard – Roberto Grau 6 : 2

1938 Carlos Guimard – Luis Piazzini 7.5 : 2.5 (Jacobo Bolbochán resigned)

1939 Roberto Grau – Carlos Guimard 7.5 : 5.5

1939 Triangular 1. Maderna, 2. Piazzini, 3. Gerschman (play-off)

1940 Carlos Maderna – Luis Piazzini 8 : 6 (Roberto Grau resigned)

1940 Triangular 1. Carlos Guimard, 2. Aristide Gromer (FRA), 3. Franciszek Sulik (POL) (play-off)

1941 Carlos Guimard – Carlos Maderna 8 : 1

1942 Héctor Rossetto – Carlos Guimard 8 : 5 (Rossetto took 3rd place, behind Markas Luckis (LTU) and Hermann Pilnik (GER) in ARG-ch 20th Mayor in 1941)

1942 Hermann Pilnik (former German, then Argentine citizen) won, ahead of Juan Traian Iliesco (ROM)

1943 Juan Iliesco (former Romanian, then Argentine citizen) took 2nd place, behind Gideon Ståhlberg (SWE)

1944 Héctor Rossetto – Juan Iliesco 4.5 : 0.5

1946 Hermann Pilnik – Héctor Rossetto 5 : 3

1948 Julio Bolbochán – Héctor Rossetto 5 : 5

1949 Miguel Najdorf (former Polish, then Argentine citizen) – Julio Bolbochán 5.5 : 4.5

1951 Triangular 1. Carlos Maderna, 2. Jacobo Bolbochán, 3. Enrique Reinhardt (play-off)

1953 Miguel Najdorf – Rubén Shocrón 4.5 : 0.5

== Argentine champions and winners of Challenger's selection tournament (1921–1953) ==
Year	Event	City	Champion	Winner of Torneo Mayor (Challenger)
1921	match in 1922	Buenos Aires	Damian Reca	Reca and Villegas
1922	extra-official match in 1923	Buenos Aires	Benito Villegas	no contest
1923	match in 1924	Buenos Aires	Damian Reca	Reca
1924	without match	Buenos Aires	Damian Reca	Richard Réti (off contest)
1925	extra-official match in 1925	Buenos Aires	Damian Reca	no contest
1926	match in 1926	Buenos Aires, Rosario, La Plata	Roberto Grau	Grau
1927	without match	Buenos Aires	Roberto Grau	Reca
1928	match in 1929	Buenos Aires	Roberto Grau	Pleci
1929	match in 1930	Buenos Aires	Isaias Pleci	Pleci
1930	match in 1931	Buenos Aires	Isaias Pleci	Virgilio Fenoglio
1931	match in 1931/1932	Buenos Aires	Jacobo Bolbochán	Jac. Bolbochan
1932	match in 1932	Buenos Aires	Jacobo Bolbochán	Pleci
1933	match in 1933	Buenos Aires	Luis Piazzini	Piazzini
1934	match in 1935	Buenos Aires	Roberto Grau	Grau
1935	match in 1936	Buenos Aires	Roberto Grau	Jac. Bolbochán, Pleci
1936	match in 1937	Buenos Aires, Santa Fe	Carlos Guimard	Guimard
1937	match in 1938	Buenos Aires, Necochea	Carlos Guimard	Jac. Bolbochán
1938	match in 1939	La Plata	Roberto Grau	Grau
1939	match in 1940	Buenos Aires	Carlos Maderna	Juan Traian Iliesco (off contest)
1940	match in 1941	Buenos Aires, La Plata	Carlos Guimard	Guimard
1941	match in 1942	9 de Julio, Buenos Aires	Hector Rossetto	Markas Luckis (off contest)
1942	without match	Buenos Aires	Herman Pilnik	Pilnik
1943	without match	Buenos Aires	Juan Iliesco	Gideon Ståhlberg (off contest)
1944	match in 1944	Nueve de Julio	Hector Rossetto	Rossetto
1945	match in 1946	Bahía Blanca	Hermann Pilnik	Pilnik
1946	without match	Buenos Aires	Julio Bolbochán	Jul. Bolbochán
1947	without match	Buenos Aires	Hector Rossetto	Rossetto
1948	match in 1948	Buenos Aires	Julio Bolbochán	Jul. Bolbochán
1949	match in 1949	Buenos Aires	Miguel Najdorf	Najdorf

== Open tournament winners (1950- ) ==
Year	Event	City	Champion	Winner of Torneo Mayor (Challenger)
1950	tournament play-off in 1951	Buenos Aires	Carlos Maderna	Maderna, Jac. Bolbochán, Enrique Reinhardt
1951	tournament	Buenos Aires	Miguel Najdorf	Najdorf
1952	match in 1953	Buenos Aires	Miguel Najdorf	Ruben Shocron
1953	tournament	Buenos Aires	Oscar Panno	
1955	tournament	Buenos Aires	Miguel Najdorf	
1956	tournament	Buenos Aires	Raul Sanguineti	
1957	tournament	Buenos Aires	Raul Sanguineti	
1958	tournament	Buenos Aires	Herman Pilnik	
1959	tournament	Buenos Aires	Bernardo Wexler	
1960	tournament	Buenos Aires	Miguel Najdorf	
1961	tournament	Buenos Aires	Héctor Rossetto	
1962	tournament	Buenos Aires	Raul Sanguineti	
1963	tournament	Buenos Aires	Raimundo García	Garcia, Samuel Schweber and Klein
1964	tournament	Buenos Aires	Miguel Najdorf	
1965	tournament	Buenos Aires	Raul Sanguineti	
1966	tournament	Buenos Aires	Miguel Quinteros	
1967	tournament	Mar del Plata	Miguel Najdorf	
1968	tournament	Buenos Aires	Raul Sanguineti	Sanguineti and Schweber
1969	tournament	Buenos Aires	Carlos Eleodoro Juárez	Juarez and Garcia
1971	tournament	Buenos Aires	Jorge Rubinetti	
1972	tournament	Buenos Aires	Hector Rossetto	
1973	tournament	Santa Fe	Raul Sanguineti	Sanguineti and Debarnot
1974	tournament	Caseros	Raul Sanguineti	
1975	tournament	Buenos Aires	Miguel Najdorf	Najdorf and Panno
1976	tournament	Buenos Aires	Jorge Szmetan	
1978	tournament	Buenos Aires	Jaime Emma	Emma and Campora
1980	tournament	Quilmes	Miguel Quinteros	
1982	tournament	Buenos Aires	Jorge Rubinetti	Rubinetti, Hase, Baillo, Bronstein and Campora
1983	tournament	Buenos Aires	Jorge Gómez Baillo	Baillo and Tempone
1984	tournament	Buenos Aires	Gerardo Barbero	
1985	tournament	Buenos Aires	Oscar Panno	
1986	tournament		Daniel Campora	
1987	tournament		Marcelo Tempone	
1988	tournament		Jorge Rubinetti	
1989	tournament		Daniel Campora	
1990	tournament		Guillermo Soppe	Soppe and Tempone
1991	tournament		Jorge Rubinetti	
1992	tournament		Oscar Panno	
1993	tournament		Hugo Spangenberg	
1994	tournament		Pablo Ricardi	
1995	tournament		Pablo Ricardi	
1996	tournament		Pablo Ricardi	
1997	tournament		Guillermo Malbran	
1998	tournament		Pablo Ricardi	
1999	tournament		Pablo Ricardi	
2000	tournament		Ariel Sorin	
2001	tournament		Ruben Felgaer	Felgaer and Peralta
2002	tournament		Martin Labollita	Labollita and Slipak
2003	tournament		Guillermo Soppe	
2004	tournament		Ariel Sorin	
2005	tournament		Diego Flores	Flores and Ricardi
2006	tournament		Fernando Peralta	
2007	tournament		Rubén Felgaer	
2008	tournament	Mendoza	Rubén Felgaer	
2009	tournament	La Plata	Diego Flores	
2010	tournament	Buenos Aires	Rubén Felgaer	
2011	tournament	La Plata	Martín Lorenzini	
2012	tournament	Villa Martelli	Diego Flores	
2013	tournament	Saenz Pena	Diego Flores	
2014	tournament	Saenz Pena	Rubén Felgaer	
2015	tournament	Buenos Aires	Sandro Mareco	
2016	tournament	Villa Martelli	Diego Flores	
2017	tournament	Ramos Mejia	Diego Flores	
2018	tournament	Laprida	Fernando Peralta	
2019	tournament	Buenos Aires	Diego Flores	
2020	tournament			
2021	tournament		Federico Pérez Ponsa	
2022	tournament	San Carlos de Bariloche	Fernando Peralta	
2023		Buenos Aires	Fernando Peralta	
2024		Buenos Aires	Sandro Mareco	
2025		Buenos Aires	Diego Flores	

== Women ==
Year	City	Champion
1938		Dora Trepat de Navarro
1939		Dora Trepat de Navarro
1940		Dora Trepat de Navarro
1941		Dora Trepat de Navarro
1942		Dora Trepat de Navarro
1948		Paulette Schwartzmann
1949		Paulette Schwartzmann
1950		Paulette Schwartzmann
1951		María Angélica Berea de Montero
1952		Paulette Schwartzmann
1953		Celia Baudot de Moschini
1954		Soledad Gonzalez de Huguet
1955		Odile Heilbronner
1956		Soledad Gonzalez de Huguet
1957		Celia Baudot de Moschini
1958		Celia Baudot de Moschini
1959		Dora Trepat de Navarro
1960		Dora Trepat de Navarro
1961		Aida Karguer
1962		Celia Baudot de Moschini
1963		Celia Baudot de Moschini
1964		Dora Trepat de Navarro
1965		Aida Karguer
1968		Celia Baudot de Moschini
1969		Aida Karguer
1971		Aida Karguer
1974		Julia Arias
1975		Julia Arias
1976		Julia Arias
1977		Julia Arias
1978		Virginia Justo
1979		Edith Soppe
1980		Edith Soppe
1981		Edith Soppe
1982		Virginia Justo
1983		Virginia Justo
1984		Virginia Justo
1985		Claudia Amura
1986		Liliana Burijovich
1987		Claudia Amura
1988		Claudia Amura
1989		Claudia Amura
1990		Liliana Burijovich
1991		Liliana Burijovich
1993		Sandra Villegas
1994		Sandra Villegas
1995		Elisa Maggiolo
1996		Sandra Villegas
1998		Elisa Maggiolo
1999		Liliana Burijovich
2000	Buenos Aires	Carolina Luján
2001		Carolina Luján
2002	Esperanza	Anahí Meza
2003	Carlos Paz	Liliana Burijovich
2004		Carolina Luján
2005	Sierra de la Ventana	Marisa Zuriel
2006	Villa Martelli	Carolina Luján
2007	Buenos Aires	María de los Angeles Plazaola
2008	Buenos Aires	María de los Angeles Plazaola
2009	Puan	María Florencia Fernández
2010	Buenos Aires	María de los Angeles Plazaola
2011	Buenos Aires	Ayelén Martínez
2012	Villa Martelli	Marisa Zuriel
2013	Estancia Grande	María Florencia Fernández
2014	Villa Martelli	Claudia Amura
2015	Buenos Aires	Carolina Luján
2016	Villa Martelli	Ayelén Martínez
2017	Buenos Aires	María Florencia Fernández
2018	Ushuaia	María Florencia Fernández
2019		
2020		
2021		
2022		
2023	Buenos Aires	María José Campos
2024		

== Bibliography ==
- Whyld, Ken (1986). Chess: The Records. Guinness Books. pp. 87–88. ISBN 0-85112-455-0.
- "Major Tournaments and Argentine Chess Championships". ARG-Base (in Spanish). WebCite.
- "Campeonato Argentino, Superior Masculino". Historia del Ajedrez en Argentina (in Spanish). Archived from the original on 2010-03-11.
- "Campeonato Argentino, Superior Femenino". Historia del Ajedrez en Argentina (in Spanish). Archived from the original on 2011-05-09.
