= Héctor Rossetto =

Argentine chess grandmaster (1922–2009)

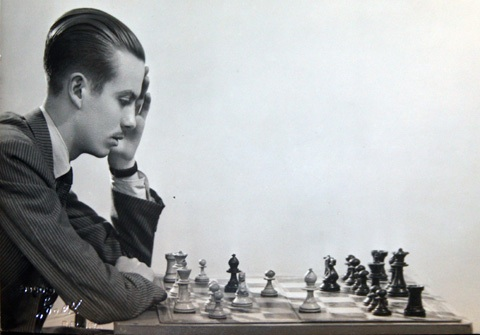

Personal information
- Born: Héctor Decio Rossetto; 8 September 1922 Bahía Blanca, Argentina
- Died: 23 January 2009 (aged 86) Buenos Aires, Argentina

Chess career
- Country: Argentina
- Title: Grandmaster (1960)
- Peak rating: 2465 (July 1972)

Héctor Decio Rossetto (8 September 1922 in Bahía Blanca, Argentina – 23 January 2009 in Buenos Aires) was an Argentine chess player.

He earned the title of International Master in 1950 and the Grandmaster title in 1960.

He was a five-time Argentine Champion (1942, 1944, 1947, 1962, and 1972). Rossetto won the Mar del Plata chess tournament in 1949 and again in 1952 (shared with Julio Bolbochán). He also won in Mar del Plata (KIM) in 1962. In 1964, he qualifield for the Interzonal Tournament in Amsterdam.

He was the director of the 1978 Chess Olympiad in Buenos Aires.

He was a player from the "golden age" of chess in Argentina, led by Miguel Najdorf, with Erich Eliskases, Hermann Pilnik, Carlos Guimard, Julio Bolbochán, and young Oscar Panno.
