= Hermann Pilnik =

German-Argentine chess grandmaster (1914–1981)

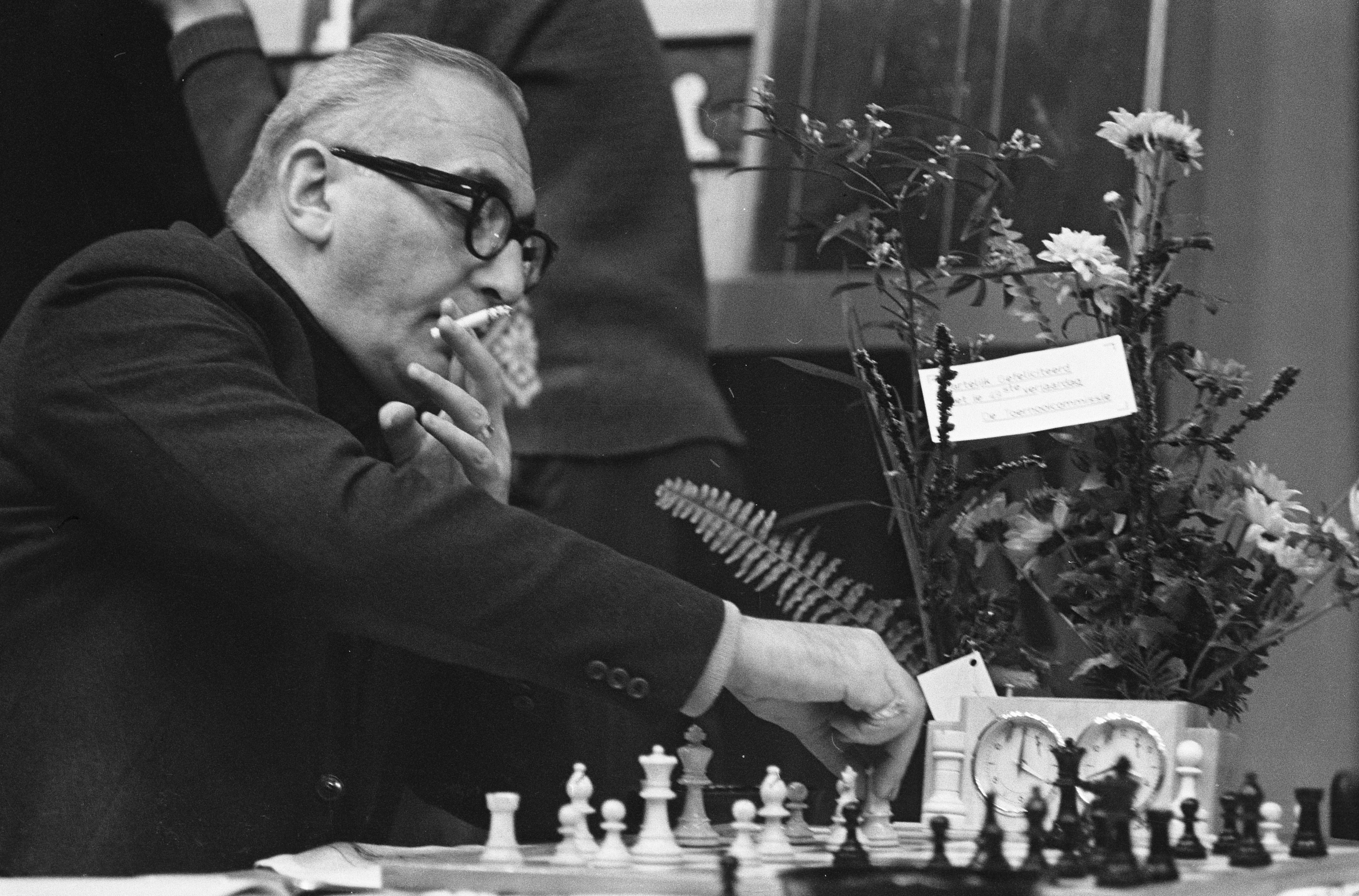
- Pilnik at Hoogovens chess tournament 1963

Personal information
- Born: 8 January 1914 Stuttgart, Germany
- Died: 12 November 1981 (aged 67) Caracas, Venezuela

Chess career
- Country: Argentina (after 1940); Germany (before 1940)
- Title: Grandmaster (1952)
- Peak rating: 2450 (July 1972)

Hermann Pilnik (8 January 1914, Stuttgart, Germany – 12 November 1981, Caracas, Venezuela) was a German-born Argentine chess Grandmaster.

== Career ==
In 1929, he won the championship of Stuttgart. Pilnik emigrated from Germany to Argentina in 1939. He won the Argentine Championships in 1942, 1945 and 1958. Pilnik began his international career in 1942, when he tied for 10-11th in New York, and tied for 2nd-3rd in Mar del Plata. In 1944, he tied for 1st with Miguel Najdorf in Mar del Plata. In July/August 1945, he took 3rd at the Hollywood Pan-American Tournament in Los Angeles. The event was won by Samuel Reshevsky. In 1951, he came third in Gijón international tournament (Euwe was the winner), and he won in Beverwijk. In 1951/52, in Vienna, In 1952, he won in Belgrade. In 1954, he won in Stuttgart.

He played for Argentina in five Chess Olympiads. In 1950, he won individual gold medal playing at first reserve board (+6 −1 =3) and team silver medal at the 9th Chess Olympiad in Dubrovnik. In 1952, he won team silver medal playing at fourth board (+6 −1 =7) at the 10th Chess Olympiad in Helsinki. In 1954, he won team silver medal playing at fourth board (+3 −2 =2) at the 11th Chess Olympiad in Amsterdam. In 1956, he played at fourth board (+7 −3 =3) at the 12th Chess Olympiad in Moscow. In 1958, he won team bronze medal playing at first board (+5 −2 =8) at the 13th Chess Olympiad in Munich.

He was awarded the International Master (IM) title in 1950 and the Grandmaster (GM) title in 1952. He took 10th at the 1956 Candidates Tournament in Amsterdam. He traveled a lot and finally settled in Venezuela, where he taught chess at the Caracas Military Academy. He died in Caracas in 1981.

The Pilnik Variation of the Ruy Lopez is named after him.

== Personal life ==
He travelled to Iceland to play a match with the rising star Friðrik Ólafsson in late 1955. Despite losing the match 1–5, his consolation was finding a wife, Anna Erla Magnúsdóttir. Maybe that's why Pilnik did much better in the 1957 rematch, losing narrowly 3.5–4.5.
