= Julio Bolbochán =

Argentine chess player (1920–1996)

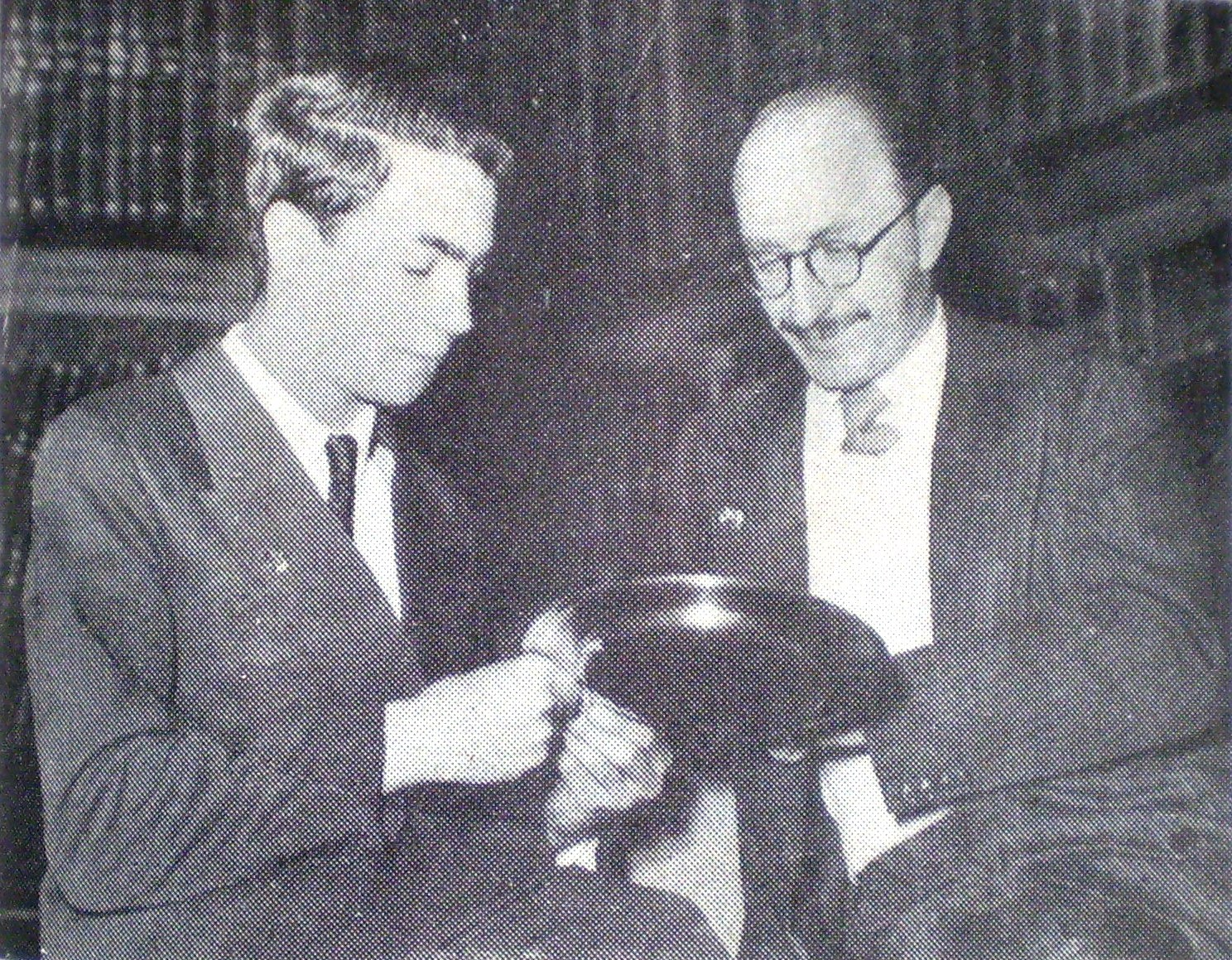
- Oscar Panno and Julio Bolbochán in 1980

Personal information
- Born: 20 March 1920 Buenos Aires, Argentina
- Died: 28 June 1996 (aged 76) Caracas, Venezuela

Chess career
- Country: Argentina; Venezuela
- Title: Honorary Grandmaster (1977); International Master (1950)
- Peak rating: 2500 (July 1971)
- Peak ranking: No. 74 (July 1972)

Julio Bolbochán (20 March 1920 – 28 June 1996) was the Argentine chess champion in 1946 and 1948.

== Career ==
He learned the game from his older brother, Jacobo Bolbochán, later an International Master.

He represented Argentina in seven Chess Olympiads from 1950 to 1970. Bolbochán earned the International Master title in 1950 and the International Grandmaster title in 1977.

He had several successes at Mar del Plata: shared first with Erich Eliskases in 1951, shared first with Héctor Rossetto in 1952, and shared first with Miguel Najdorf in 1956.

Bolbochán qualified to play in the Sousse interzonal in 1967 but didn't participate due to the Argentine Chess Federation not having enough funds to send him.

After 1976 he lived as a chess teacher in Venezuela.

He represented Venezuela in the 1977 Maccabiah Games, 1981 Maccabiah Games, 1985 Maccabiah Games, and 1989 Maccabiah Games. He was the chess coach at the Universidad Simón Bolívar Chess Club for over 20 years.

== Games ==
Bolbochán vs. Evans, Helsinki 1952

Position: white rook, white pawn, black bishop, black pawn, white pawn, black pawn, black rook, white queen, black pawn, white pawn, white bishop, white pawn, white bishop, black bishop, white pawn, white pawn, white knight, black knight, black king, white rook, black pawn, white pawn, black knight, white knight, white king, black pawn, black pawn, black pawn, black queen, black rook, white pawn, black pawn

25. Qf5 1–0

Here is his victory in Bolbochán-Larry Evans in the 1952 Chess Olympiad in Helsinki:
1. d4 d5 2. c4 dxc4 3. Nf3 a6 4. e3 Nf6 5. Bxc4 e6 6. O-O c5 7. Qe2 Nc6 8. Nc3 b5 9. Bb3 cxd4 10. exd4 Nxd4 11. Nxd4 Qxd4 12. Nd5 Nxd5 13. Rd1 Nc3 14. bxc3 Qb6 15. Qe5 Bb7 16. Be3 Qc6 17. Bd5 Qc8 18. Bxb7 Qxb7 19. a4 Rc8 20. axb5 Qxb5 21. Qd4 e5 22. Qg4 Rd8 23. Rxd8+ Kxd8 24. Rd1+ Ke7 25. Qf5 1–0.
