= List of Israeli chess players =

This is a list of Israeli chess title-holders As of January 2026

== Grandmasters ==
- Boris Alterman
- Boris Avrukh
- Tal Baron
- Sergey Erenburg
- Alexander Finkel
- Boris Gelfand
- Alik Gershon
- Vitali Golod
- Alon Greenfeld
- Yehuda Gruenfeld
- Lev Gutman
- Alexander Huzman
- Boris Kantsler
- Ilya Khmelniker
- Artur Kogan
- Yona Kosashvili
- Yair Kraidman
- Ronen Lev
- Eran Liss
- Ilan Manor
- Victor Mikhalevski
- Vadim Milov
- Jacob Murey
- Tamir Nabaty
- Michael Oratovsky
- Evgeny Postny
- Lev Psakhis
- Gad Rechlis
- Maxim Rodshtein
- Michael Roiz
- Ilya Smirin
- Ram Soffer
- Emil Sutovsky
- Mark Tseitlin
- Dov Zifroni
- Yaacov Zilberman
- Dan Zoler
- Dmitry Gooshchin
- Bruce Alesin

== Woman Grandmasters ==
- Bella Igla
- Ela Pitam
- Tatiana Zatulovskaya
- Dina Belenkaya

== International Masters ==
- Alon Mindlin
- Ariel Erenberg
- Yochanan Afek
- Vladimir Alterman
- Roman Bar
- Mark Berkovich
- Nathan Birnboim
- Igor Bitansky
- Inon Boim
- Angela Borsuk (also WGM)
- Ilia Botvinnik
- Ofer Bruk
- Leonid Gerzhoy
- Asaf Givon
- Shimon Kagan
- Alexander Kaspi
- Masha Klinova (also WGM)
- Alexander Krayz
- Alexander Kundin
- Leon Lederman
- Gaby Livshitz
- Boris Maryasin
- Alexander Mikhalevski
- Gur Mittelman
- Shay Porat
- Eduard Porper
- Alexander Rabinovich
- Nati Ribshtein
- Arkady Shevelev
- Eliahu Shvidler
- Yaacov Stisis
- Maxim Uritzky
- Eli Vovsha
- Alik Vydeslaver
- Uriel Zak

== Woman International Masters ==
- Marsel Efroimski
- Maya Porat
- Ludmila Tsifanskaya
- Olga Vasiliev

== Notable inactive players ==
=== Men ===
- Yoel Aloni (M)
- Amikam Balshan (M)
- Yaacov Bernstein (M)
- Zadok Domnitz (M)
- Roman Dzindzichashvili (GM)
- Uzi Geller (IM)
- Emanuel Guthi (M)
- Izaak Grynfeld (M)
- Ronen Har-Zvi (GM)
- Gedali Szapiro (M)
- Leonid Yudasin (GM)
- Leonid Gratvol (M)

=== Women ===
- Ljuba Kristol (WIM)

== Notable deceased players ==
=== Men ===
- Izak Aloni (M)
- Abram Blass (M)
- Yaacov Bleiman (IM)
- Moshe Czerniak (IM)
- Yosef Dobkin (M)
- Boruch Israel Dyner (M)
- David Enoch (M)
- Zvulon Gofshtein (GM)
- Zelman Kleinstein (M)
- Vladimir Liberzon (GM)
- Aleksandras Machtas (M)
- Ariah Mohiliver (M)
- Menachem Oren (M)
- Raaphi Persitz (M)
- Yosef Porat (IM)
- Meir Rauch (M)
- Leonid Shamkovich (GM)
- Shlomo Smiltiner (M)
- Isakas Vistaneckis (M)
- Victor Winz (M)

=== Women ===
- Alla Kushnir (WGM)

== See also ==
- List of Israelis
- List of chess players
