= Alexander Finkel =

Israeli chess grandmaster (born 1975)

Personal information
- Born: January 1, 1975 (age 51) Kamianets-Podilskyi, Soviet Union

Chess career
- Country: Soviet Union; Israel
- Title: Grandmaster (1995)
- Peak rating: 2521 (March 2014)

Alexander Finkel (Ukrainian: Олександр Фінкель; born 1 January 1975) is an Israeli chess Grandmaster of Ukrainian origin.

== Chess career ==
Until 1991, Finkel lived with his family in Ukraine. He began participating in international tournaments shortly after emigrating to Israel. He debuted on the FIDE rating list on 1 January 1993 with a rating of 2295, and surpassed 2500 points two years later, earning the title of Grandmaster in 1995.

His path to the Grandmaster title included a tied first place in Tel Aviv (1993, alongside Alexander Kaspi), as well as strong performances in Groningen (1993), Budapest (1993), Beer Sheva (1994), and Rishon LeZion (1995). In 1997, he shared first place (alongside Victor Mikhalevski and Ye Rongguang) in Dieren, and finished fifth in Beer Sheva (behind Eduardas Rozentalis, Semyon Dvoirys, Boris Kantsler, and Boris Avrukh, but ahead of Viktor Korchnoi). In 2000, he finished fourth (behind Boris Avrukh, Alik Gershon, and Lev Psakhis) in the final of the Israeli Chess Championship. In 2002, he won (jointly with Evgeny Postny and Yakov Zilberman) the national championship semi-final held in Haifa. Since 2004, he has significantly scaled back his participation in individual tournaments, competing almost exclusively in team events in Israel.

Since the early 2000s, he has been a regular commentator for ChessBase. In 2004, he earned a degree in law from Tel Aviv University.

He reached his peak career rating of 2521 on 1 March 2014.
