= Mark Tseitlin =

Israeli chess grandmaster (1943–2022)

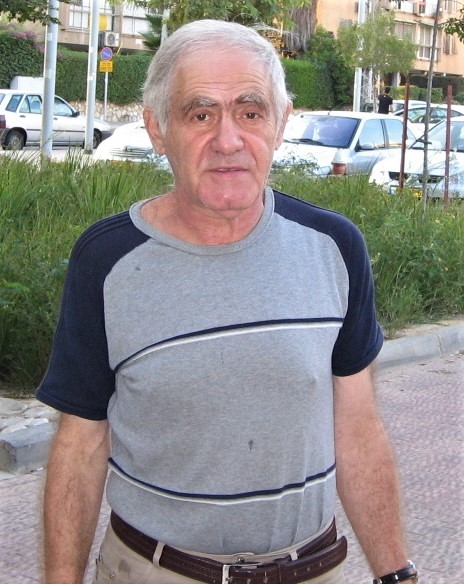

Personal information
- Native name: מארק צייטלין
- Born: 23 September 1943 Frunze, Kyrgyz SSR, USSR
- Died: 25 January 2022 (aged 78) Beer Sheva, Israel

Chess career
- Country: Soviet Union (before 1991); Israel (after 1991)
- Title: Grandmaster (1997)
- Peak rating: 2545 (July 1995)

Mark Tseitlin (Hebrew: מארק צייטלין; Russian: Марк Данилович Цейтлин, romanized: Mark Danilovich Tseitlin; 23 September 1943 – 25 January 2022) was a Soviet-born Israeli chess player. He was awarded the title of International Master in 1978 and that of Grandmaster in 1997. Tseitlin was a four-time European seniors champion.

== Career ==
Tseitlin got acquainted with chess in Leningrad's Pioneers Palace. He was self-taught, having studied without a coach. He was Leningrad champion in 1970, 1975, 1976, and jointly in 1978.

During his playing career he defeated Viktor Korchnoi four times and beat many famous grandmasters. His best tournament achievements include first place at Polanica-Zdrój 1978 (ahead of Andersson), and second at Trnava 1979 (after Plachetka). Tseitlin was the many-time Beer-Sheva chess club champion.

Tseitlin won the European Seniors Championship four times: in 2004 in Arvier, 2005 in Bad Homburg, 2008 in Dresden and 2013 in Plovdiv.

In 2004 Tseitlin won the first World Senior Team Championship, held in the Isle of Man, playing for team Israel together with Jacob Murey, Yair Kraidman and Yedael Stepak.

== Trainer ==
There were many international grandmasters and masters among Tseitlin's apprentices. Among his pupils were such famous chess players as grandmasters Alexander Finkel, Boris Avrukh, Ilya Smirin, Victor Mikhalevski and Dimitri Tyomkin. Mark Tseitlin assisted the rise of former world champion Anatoly Karpov, and strong Soviet grandmaster Rafael Vaganian.

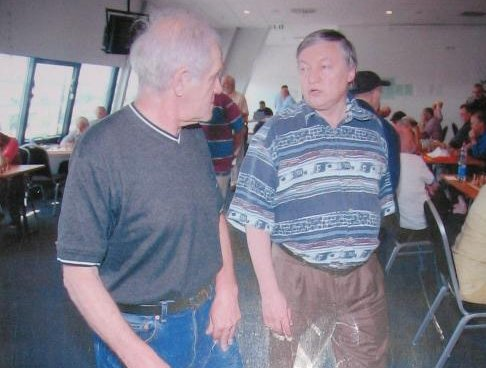
Tseitlin and Karpov

He was known for his sharp tactical vision at the chessboard, and was an acknowledged expert in many chess openings, such as the Grunfeld Defence.

== Personal life and death ==
Born in Leningrad, Tseitlin immigrated to Israel in 1990, and was a trainer at the Beer-Sheva Eliahu Levant chess club.

Tseitlin died in Beer Sheva on 25 January 2022, at the age of 78. He had a daughter, Ira, and two granddaughters, who are living in Germany.

== Notable chess games ==
The following game illustrates Tseitlin's sharp tactical style.

Tseitlin - Vladimir Karasev

Severodonetsk, 1982

1. e4 c5 2. Nf3 d6 3. d4 Nf6 4. Nc3 cxd4 5. Nxd4 a6 6. Bg5 Nbd7 7. Bc4 h6 8. Be3 e6 9. O-O Nc5 10. Qf3 b5 11. b4!? bxc4 12. bxc5 dxc5 (diagram)

Position: a8 black rook, c8 black bishop, d8 black queen, e8 black king, f8 black bishop, h8 black rook, f7 black pawn, g7 black pawn, a6 black pawn, e6 black pawn, f6 black knight, h6 black pawn, c5 black pawn, c4 black pawn, d4 white knight, e4 white pawn, c3 white knight, e3 white bishop, f3 white queen, a2 white pawn, c2 white pawn, f2 white pawn, g2 white pawn, h2 white pawn, a1 white rook, f1 white rook, g1 white king

The position after 12. ... dxc5

13. Nf5! Bb7

The following line illustrates dangers of Black's defence: 13. ... exf5 14. exf5 Ra7 15. Rfe1 Be7 16. Bxc5 Rd7 17. Bxe7 Rxe7 18. Qc6+ Nd7 19. Nd5! Rxe1+ 20. Rxe1+ Kf8 21. Qd6+ Kg8 22. Ne7+ Kh7 23. Qg6+!! fxg6 24. fxg6 checkmate.

14. Rab1 Qc8 15. Ng3 Be7 16. Na4 Nd7 17. Nh5 Kf8

Black cannot castle because of 18.Qg4

Position: b8 white rook, h8 black rook, a7 black rook, f7 black pawn, h7 black king, a6 black pawn, f6 black bishop, g6 black pawn, h6 black pawn, c5 black pawn, f5 black queen, c4 black pawn, e4 black bishop, f4 white knight, h4 white pawn, c3 white bishop, g3 white queen, a2 white pawn, c2 white pawn, f2 white pawn, g2 white pawn, b1 white rook, g1 white king

The position after 28. ... Bf6?

18. Nb6 Nxb6 19. Rxb6 g6 20. Rfb1 Ra7 21. Nf4 Kg7 22. Bd2 Bf6 23. Qg3 Kh7 24. Rxe6 Bg5 25. Reb6 Bxe4 26. h4 Bd8 27. Rb8 Qf5 28. Bc3 Bf6? (diagram)

In time trouble Vladimir Karasev fails to find best defence 28. ... Re8

29. Nh5!! -It is impossible to fend off such surprise even with enough time. If 29. ... gxh5 30. Rxh8+ Bxh8 then 31. Rb8 is winning.

29. ... Rxb8 30. Nxf6+ Qxf6 31. Rxb8 1-0
