= Alexander Huzman =

Israeli chess grandmaster (born 1962)

Personal information
- Native name: אלכסנדר הוזמן
- Born: April 10, 1962 (age 64) Zhitomir, Soviet Union (now Zhytomyr, Ukraine)

Chess career
- Country: Israel (after 1992); Soviet Union (before 1991)
- Title: Grandmaster (1991)
- FIDE rating: 2478 (October 2026)
- Peak rating: 2607 (July 2011)

Alexander Huzman (Hebrew: אלכסנדר הוזמן, Russian: Александр Хузман; born 10 April 1962) is an Israeli (formerly Soviet) chess Grandmaster and trainer.

== Career ==
He played in several Ukrainian championships. In 1985, he took 6th in Uzhgorod. In 1986, he tied for 4-5th in Kyiv. In 1987, he took 6th in Mykolaiv. In 1989, he tied for 8-9th in Kherson. In 1990, he tied for 5-7th in Simferopol.

Huzman, who is Jewish, moved to Israel in 1992.

He represented Israel five times in Chess Olympiads.

- In 1996, at first reserve board at the 32nd Chess Olympiad in Yerevan (+3 –1 =5);
- In 2000, at second reserve board at the 34th Chess Olympiad in Istanbul (+1 –1 =4);
- In 2002, at second reserve board at the 35th Chess Olympiad in Bled (+4 –0 =4);
- In 2004, at first reserve board at the 36th Chess Olympiad in Calvià (+4 –1 =3);
- In 2006, at first reserve board at the 37th Chess Olympiad in Turin (+3 –0 =4).

In 1999, he tied for 5-6th with Boris Avrukh in Tel Aviv (Boris Gelfand, Ilia Smirin, and Lev Psakhis won). In 2000, he tied for 1st-2nd with Avrukh in Biel Open (Avrukh won a final blitz game). In 2003 during the European Clubs Cup in Crete, he scored an upset win over Garry Kasparov after Kasparov made a rare blunder. In 2004, he took 6th in Beer Sheva Rapid (Viktor Korchnoi won). In 2005, he took 3rd in Montreal (Victor Mikhalevski won).

Huzman has trained Canadian Grandmaster Mark Bluvshtein, with success, and seconded top player Boris Gelfand.
