= Israeli Chess Championship =

Yearly chess event in Israel

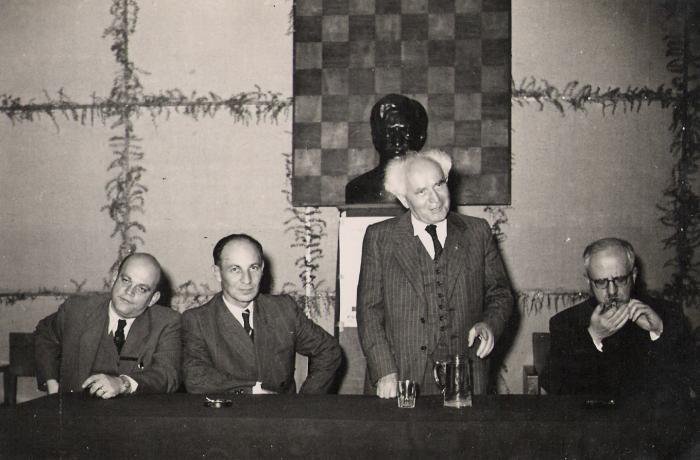
David Ben-Gurion at the closing ceremony of the first Israeli Chess Championship, 1951. (Note: Right to left: Pinhas Rosen Justice minister and honorary president of Israel Chess Association, David Ben Gurion, Israel Rabinovich-Barav, Dr Yehouda Grunegard)

The Israeli Chess Championship is a chess event held every year in Israel.

== History ==
From 1951 to 1971, the men's and women's championships were held every two years, eventually becoming an annual event.

== Winners ==
| # | Year | Men's Champion |
|---|---|---|
| 1 | 1936 | Moshe Czerniak |
| 2 | 1937 | Yosef Porat |
| 3 | 1938 | Moshe Czerniak |
| 4 | 1940 | Yosef Porat |
| 5 | 1945 | Izak Aloni |
| 6 | 1951 | Menachem Oren |
| 7 | 1953 | Yosef Porat |
| 8 | 1955 | Moshe Czerniak |
| 9 | 1957 | Yosef Porat |
| 10 | 1959 | Yosef Porat |
| 11 | 1961 | Izak Aloni |
| 12 | 1963 | Yosef Porat |
| 13 | 1965 | Izak Aloni |
| 14 | 1967 | Shimon Kagan |
| 15 | 1969 | Shimon Kagan |
| 16 | 1971 | Uzi Geller |
| 17 | 1974 | Vladimir Liberzon |
| 18 | 1976 | Nathan Birnboim |
| 19 | 1978 | Roman Dzindzichashvili |
| 20 | 1980 | Nathan Birnboim |
| 21 | 1982 | Yehuda Gruenfeld |
| 22 | 1984 | Alon Greenfeld |
| 23 | 1986 | Nathan Birnboim |
| 24 | 1988 | Gad Rechlis |
| 25 | 1990 | Yehuda Gruenfeld |
| 26 | 1992 | Ilya Smirin |
| 27 | 1994 | Leonid Yudasin |
| 28 | 1996 | Lev Psakhis |
| 29 | 1998 | Eran Liss |
| 30 | 2000 | Boris Avrukh; Alik Gershon |
| 31 | 2002 | Ilya Smirin |
| 32 | 2004 | Sergey Erenburg |
| 33 | 2006 | Maxim Rodshtein |
| 34 | 2008 (Note: Men's and women's competition held together) | Boris Avrukh |
| 35 | 2010 | Vitali Golod |
| 36 | 2013 | Tamir Nabaty |
| 37 | 2014 | Victor Mikhalevski |
| 38 | 2016 | Tamir Nabaty |
| 39 | 2018 | Alon Greenfeld |

| # | Year | Women's Champion |
|---|---|---|
| 1 | 1955 | Ora Nodel Yaron |
| 2 | 1957 | Rivka Lichtenfeld |
| 3 | 1959 | Genia Gevenda |
| 4 | 1961 | Clara Friedman |
| 5 | 1963 | Clara Friedman |
| 6 | 1965 | Clara Friedman |
| 7 | 1967 | Sima Rabinovitz Forman |
| 8 | 1969 | Frida Rabinovitz Schahar |
| 9 | 1971 | Lidia Gal |
| 10 | 1974 | Olga Podrazhanskaya |
| 11 | 1976 | Olga Podrazhanskaya |
| 12 | 1978 | Ljuba Kristol |
| 13 | 1980 | Lena Glaz |
| 14 | 1982 | Ljuba Kristol; Olga Podrazhanskaya |
| 15 | 1984 | Ljuba Kristol |
| 16 | 1986 | Shlomit Vardi |
| 17 | 1988 | Ljuba Kristol |
| 18 | 1990 | Ljuba Kristol |
| 19 | 1992 | Masha Klinova |
| 20 | 1994 | Ludmila Tsifanskaya |
| 21 | 1996 | Ludmila Tsifanskaya |
| 22 | 1998 | Irina Yudasina |
| 23 | 2000 | Ela Pitam |
| 24 | 2002 | Irina Botvinnik |
| 25 | 2004 | Bella Igla |
| 26 | 2006 | Bela Atnilov |
| 27 | 2008 (Note: Embedded in the unified men's and women's championship finals (not as a separate competition).) | Olga Vasiliev |
| 28 | 2010 | Masha Klinova |
| 29 | 2013 | Olga Vasiliev |
| 30 | 2014 | Olga Vasiliev |
| 31 | 2016 | Michal Lahav |
| 32 | 2018 | Yuliya Shvayger |

| # | Year | Junior Champion |
|---|---|---|
| 1 | 1951 | Raaphi Persitz |
| 2 | 1954 | Giora Peli |
| 3 | 1958 | Yedael Stepak |
| 4 | 1959 | Yehuda Oppenheim |
| 5 | 1960 | Israel Gat |
| 6 | 1961 | Daniel Mor |
| 7 | 1962 | Israel Gelfer |
| 8 | 1963 | Yaacov Bleiman |
| 9 | 1964 | Yaacov Bleiman |
| 10 | 1965 | Amikam Balshan |
| 11 | 1966 | Abraham Neyman |
| 12 | 1967 | Nathan Birnboim |
| 13 | 1968 | Nathan Birnboim On Neyman |
| 14 | 1969 | Yoel Temanlis |
| 15 | 1970 | Arie Lev |
| 16 | 1971 | Chagai Scheinwald |
| 17 | 1972 | Chagai Scheinwald |
| 18 | 1973 | David Bernstein |
| 19 | 1974 | Yehuda Gruenfeld |
| 20 | 1975 | Nir Greenberg |
| 21 | 1976 | Ehud Lahav |
| 22 | 1977 | Michael Pasman |
| 23 | 1978 | Alon Greenfeld |
| 24 | 1979 | Alon Greenfeld |
| 25 | 1980 | Dan Lapan |
| 26 | 1981 | Ran Shabtai |
| 27 | 1982 | Moshe Pyernik |
| 28 | 1983 | Ofer Brook |
| 29 | 1984 | Ronen Lev |
| 30 | 1985 | Ilan Manor |
| 31 | 1986 | Danny Barash |
| 32 | 1987 | Ronen Lev |
| 33 | 1988 | Ilan Manor |
| 34 | 1989 | Eran Liss |
| 35 | 1990 | Dan Zoler |
| 36 | 1991 | Victor Mikhalevski |
| 37 | 1992 | Victor Mikhalevski |
| 38 | 1993 | Eran Liss |
| 39 | 1994 | Michael Oratovsky |
| 40 | 1995 | Alik Vydeslaver |
| 41 | 1996 | Boris Avrukh |
| 42 | 1997 | Dimitri Tyomkin |
| 43 | 1998 | Alexander Rabinovich |
| 44 | 1999 | Michael Roiz |
| 45 | 2000 | Alik Gershon |
| 46 | 2001 | Evgeny Postny |
| 47 | 2002 | Sergey Erenburg |
| 48 | 2003 | Sergey Erenburg |
| 49 | 2004 | Baruch Sternberg |
| 50 | 2005 | Gaby Livshits |
| 51 | 2006 | Maxim Rodshtein |
| 52 | 2007 | Sasha Kaplan |
| 53 | 2008 | Gil Popilsky (Note: U15 champion. The U17 championship was cancelled, due to lack of enough participants.) |
| 54 | 2012 | Asaf Givon |
| 55 | 2014 | Asaf Givon |
| 56 | 2015 | Nimrod Veinberg |
| 57 | 2017 | Avital Borochovsky |
| 58 | 2018 | Johnatan Bakalchuk |
| 59 | 2019 | Yair Parkhov |
| 60 | 2020 | Erez Kupervaser |

== Bibliography ==
- Whyld, Ken (1986), Chess: The Records, Guinness Books, p. 104, ISBN 0-85112-455-0 (results through 1982)
- Crowther, Mark (30 November 1998), THE WEEK IN CHESS 212, London Chess Center
- Wolsza, Tadeusz (2007), Arcymistrzowie, mistrzowie, amatorzy. Słownik biograficzny szachistów polskich, vol. 5, Warsaw: Wydawnictwo DiG, ISBN 83-7181-495-X
