= Olga Podrazhanskaya =

Israeli chess player (born 1948)

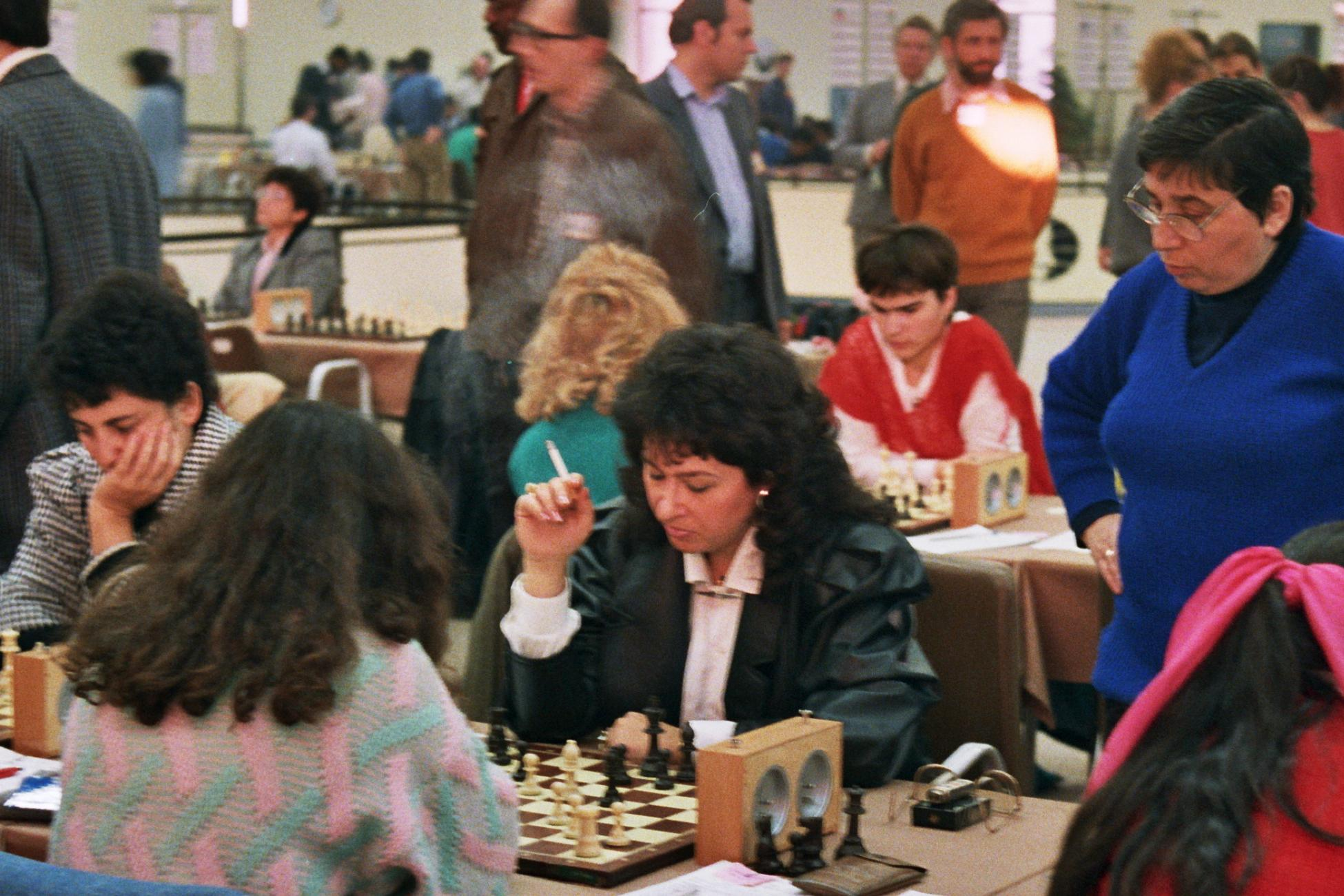

Personal information
- Native name: אולגה פודראז'נסקיה
- Born: 29 May 1948 (age 78) Leningrad, Soviet Union

Chess career
- Country: Soviet Union (before 1973); Israel (after 1973)
- Title: Woman International Master (1982)
- Peak rating: 2220 (July 1988)

Olga Podrazhanskaya (Hebrew: אולגה פודראז'נסקיה; Russian: Ольга Подражанская; born 29 May 1948) is an Israeli chess player who holds the title of Woman International Master (WIM, 1982) and won team gold medal in 7th Chess Olympiad (women) in 1976. She is a three-time winner the Israeli Women Chess Championship (1974, 1976, 1980).

== Chess career ==
In 1969 Olga Podrazhanskaya shared 3rd place in Leningrad Women Chess Championship. In 1971 she won Leningrad Women Chess blitz championship. In 1971 she won Leningrad Women Chess blitz championship. In 1973 she won Soviet sport society Lokomotiv Women Chess Championship.

Moved to Israel in 1973. She won three Israeli Women Chess Championships: in 1974, 1976, and 1982 (together with Ljuba Kristol).

Olga Podrazhanskaya played for Israel in the Women's Chess Olympiads:

- In 1974, at first board in the 6th Chess Olympiad (women) in Medellín (+9, =2, -2),
- In 1976, at third board in the 7th Chess Olympiad (women) in Haifa (+4, =1, -3) and won team gold medal,
- In 1980, at third board in the 9th Chess Olympiad (women) in Valletta (+2, =3, -2),
- In 1988, at third board in the 28th Chess Olympiad (women) in Thessaloniki (+6, =2, -5),
- In 1990, at second board in the 29th Chess Olympiad (women) in Novi Sad (+7, =0, -6).

== Literature ==
- Игорь Бердичевский. Шахматная еврейская энциклопедия. Москва: Русский шахматный дом, 2016. ISBN 978-5-94693-503-6
