= Frida Schahar-Rabinovich =

Israeli chess player

Personal information
- Native name: פרידה שחר-רבינוביץ
- Born: 17 March 1950 (age 76) Vilnius, Lithuania

Chess career
- Country: Israel

Frida Schahar-Rabinovich (née Rabinovich; Hebrew: פרידה שחר-רבינוביץ; born 17 March 1950), is an Israeli chess player. She is a winner the Israeli Women's Chess Championship (1969).

== Biography ==
Frida Schahar-Rabinovich was born and raised in Vilnius, Lithuania. Her father, who ran a furniture chain, taught her and her older sister, Sima, to play chess. In 1966, she immigrated to Israel with her family and lived in the southern Tzahala in Tel Aviv. She studied Hebrew in a studio at Kibbutz Merhavia.

At the 1967 Israeli Women's Chess Championship, Frida Schahar-Rabinovich finished second with outgoing champion Clara Friedman after her older sister, Sima Rabinovich.

In the Israeli Women's Chess Championship that ended in January 1970, Frida Schahar-Rabinovich won the title, a host who won with all her might and scored 12 points.

Frida Schahar-Rabinovich played for Israel in the Women's Chess Olympiad:

- In 1972, at first board in the 5th Chess Olympiad (women) in Skopje (+2, =4, -3).

Frida Schahar-Rabinovich worked as a chemical laboratory worker in the Plant Protection Division of the Ministry of Agriculture.

== Literature ==
- Игорь Бердичевский. Шахматная еврейская энциклопедия. Москва: Русский шахматный дом, 2016 (Gad Berdichevsky. The Chess Jewish Encyclopedia. Moscow: Russian Chess House, 2016, p. 201) ISBN 978-5-94693-503-6
