= Zadok Domnitz =

Israeli chess player (1933–2023)

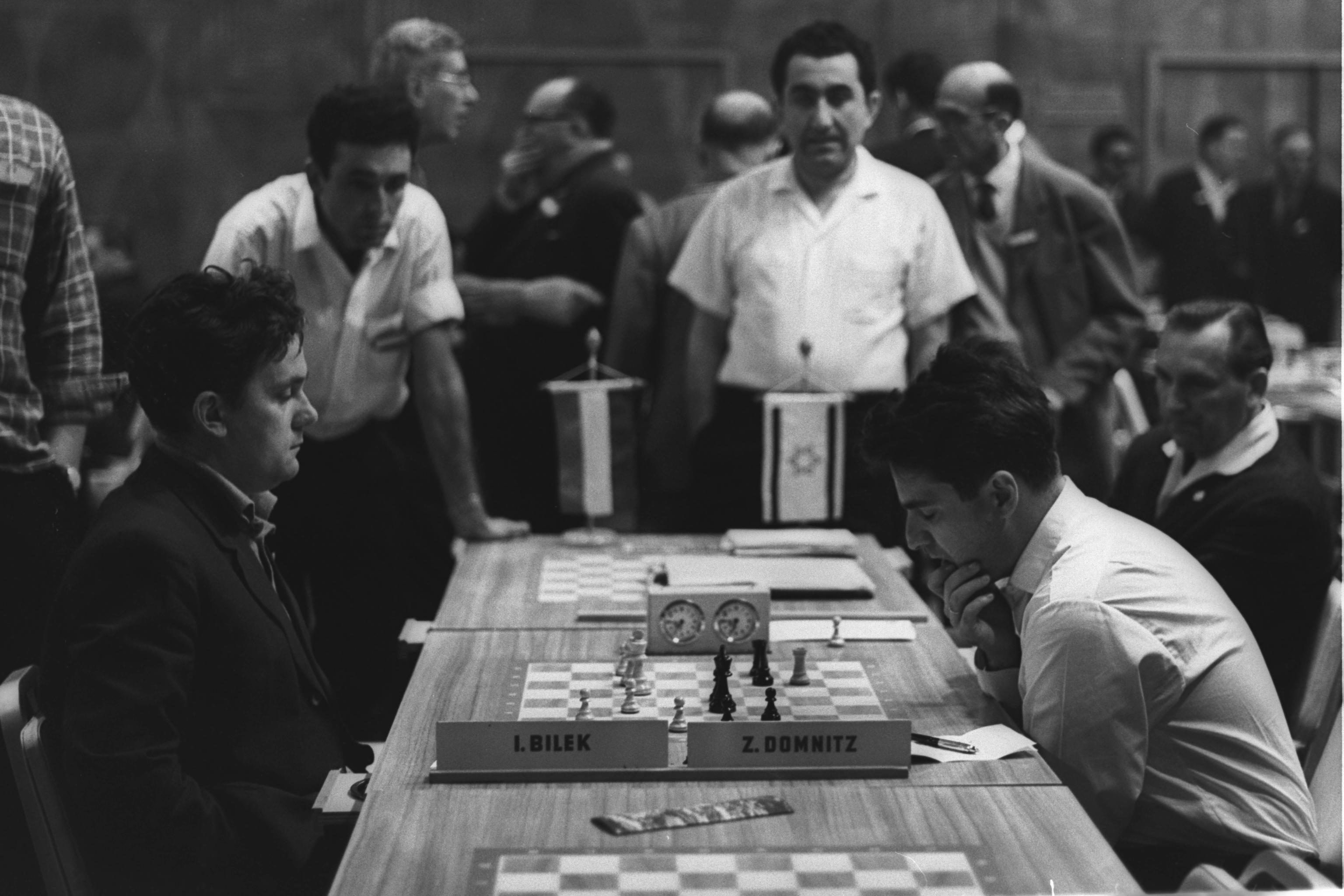
Bilek v Domnitz - 16th Chess Olympiad

Zadok Domnitz (Hebrew: צדוק דומניץ; 15 October 1933 – 2023) was an Israeli chess master, born in Tel Aviv.

Domnitz played three times for Israel in Chess Olympiads.

- In 1962, at first reserve board in 15th Olympiad in Varna (+5 −2 =3);
- In 1964, at third board in 16th Olympiad in Tel Aviv (+0 −6 =7);
- In 1968, at first reserve board in 18th Olympiad in Lugano (+4 −2 =6).

He took 16th place at Tel Aviv 1966 (Svetozar Gligorić won). He tied for 6–7th at the 1967 Israeli championship (Shimon Kagan won). In 1968, he tied for 7–10th in Netanya (Robert James Fischer won). In 1969, he took 14th in Netanya (Samuel Reshevsky won). In 1973, he tied for 14–15th in Netanya (Lubomir Kavalek won).

Domnitz died in 2023, at the age of 89.

== See also ==
- List of Jewish chess players
