= Giora Peli =

Israeli chess player (1936–2020)

Giora Peli (Gyora Pilshchik)
Personal information
- Native name: גיורא פלי
- Born: 21 August 1936
- Died: July 2020 (aged 83)

Chess career
- Country: Israel
- Title: Senior International Master (2002)
- ICCF rating: 2201 (July 2017)
- ICCF peak rating: 2542 (October 2002)

Giora Peli (Hebrew: גיורא פלי; also Gyora Pilshchik; 21 August 1936 – July 2020) was an Israeli chess player.

== Biography ==
From the second half of 1950s, Giora Peli was one of Israeli leading junior chess players. In 1954, he won Israeli Junior Chess Championship. In 1957, Peli participated for the first time in the Israeli Chess Championship and finished in 6th place. In 1965, he ranked 5th in this tournament, but in 1974, he ranked in 12th place.

Peli played for Israel in the Chess Olympiad:

- In 1958, at first reserve board in 13th Chess Olympiad in Munich (+3, =2, -2).

Peli played for Israel in the World Student Team Chess Championships:

- In 1959, at fourth board in the 6th World Student Team Chess Championship in Budapest (+5, =2, -5),
- In 1962, at third board in the 9th World Student Team Chess Championship in Mariánské Lázně (+6, =1, -3).

Since the 1980s, Peli was known as a correspondence chess player. He was awarded the ICCF titles of International Correspondence Chess Master (IM) in 2001 and Senior International Correspondence Chess Master (SIM) in 2002.
