= Liudmila Belavenets =

Russian chess player (1940–2021)

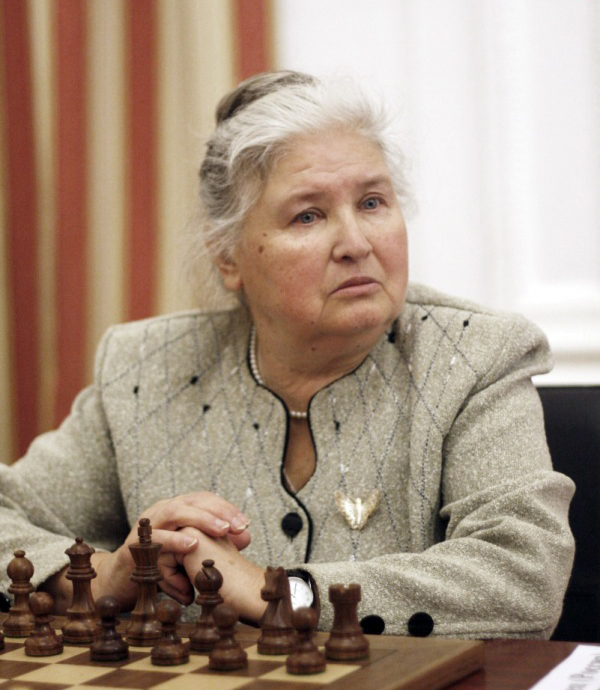
- Belavenets in 2011

Personal information
- Born: Liudmila Sergeyevna Belavenets; 7 June 1940 Moscow, Soviet Union
- Died: 7 November 2021 (aged 81) Moscow, Russia

Chess career
- Country: Russia
- Title: FIDE Woman Intl. Master (1977); ICCF Lady Grandmaster (1991)
- ICCF World Champion: 1984–1992 (women)
- Peak rating: 2210 (January 1990)
- ICCF peak rating: 2213 (July 1994)

Liudmila Sergeyevna Belavenets (Russian: Людмила Сергеевна Белавенец; also transliterated Lyudmila Sergeevna Belavenets; 7 June 1940 – 7 November 2021) was a Russian chess player.

== Biography ==
Born in Moscow, she was the daughter of Russian chess master Sergey Belavenets.

In correspondence chess, Belavenets was the fourth women's world champion (1984–1992) and was awarded the titles of Lady Grandmaster and International Master in 1991. In over-the-board chess, she won the Women's Soviet Chess Championship in 1975 and was awarded the title of Woman International Master by FIDE in 1977. In 2010, she was awarded also the title of FIDE Senior Trainer.

=== Death ===
Belavenets died from COVID-19 in Moscow on 7 November 2021, at age 81, amid the COVID-19 pandemic in Russia.

Preceded by Ljuba Kristol	Ladies World Correspondence Chess Champion; 1984–1992	Succeeded by Ljuba Kristol
