= David Enoch =

Israeli chess player

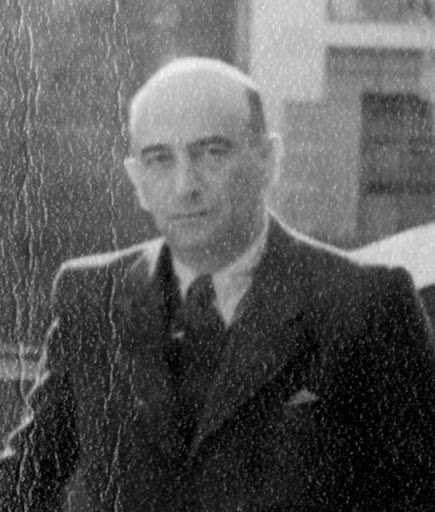
David Enoch

David Enoch (Hebrew: דוד אנוך; 1901–1949) was an Israeli chess player.

== Biography ==
David Enoch was born in Oświęcim in 1901. He emigrated to Berlin after the First World War. He tied for 6-7th at Berlin 1927 (Alfred Brinckmann won), and took 10th at Berlin 1929 (Berthold Koch won).

Enoch immigrated from Germany to British Mandate Palestine in 1933.

== Chess career ==
He took 2nd, behind Abram Blass, at Tel Aviv 1935 (the 2nd Maccabiah Games). He played for Palestine on second board in the 6th Chess Olympiad at Warsaw 1935 (+6 –6 =5).

He won against Creevey (IRL), Henri Grob (SUI), Bjørn Nielsen (DEN), Rasmusson (FIN), George Alan Thomas (ENG), and Karel Opočensky (CSR).

He drew with Stefano Rosselli del Turco (ITA), Mieczysław Najdorf (POL), Aleksandras Machtas (LTU), Frank Marshall (USA), and Andor Lilienthal (HUN).

He lost to Louis Betbeder Matibet (FRA), Milan Vidmar (YUG), Rudolf Spielmann (AUT), Gunnar Friedemann (EST), Miklós Bródy (ROM), and Gösta Stoltz (SWE).

A game he lost at Berlin 1927 against Aron Nimzowitsch is included in Nimzowitsch's My Praxis.

== See also ==
- List of Israeli chess players
