= Izaak Grynfeld =

Izaak Grynfeld (Hebrew: איזק גרינפלד; born 12 February 1912, date of death unknown), later known as Ignacy Branicki , was a Polish-born Israeli chess master.

== Biography ==
Grynfeld was born in Łódź, Poland in February 1912. Before the late 1950s, Grynfeld lived in The Netherlands. After years of playing chess professionally in Europe, he immigrated to Israel and changed his name around 1955 to Ignacy Branicki. It is not known when Grynfeld died but he was still alive in 1993.

== Chess career ==
In 1938, he tied for 3rd-4th in Kraków (POL-ch elim; Izak Schaechter won). After World War II, he played six-times in Polish championships (1946–1953). His best achievement was a 3rd-4th place at Sopot 1946 (Bogdan Śliwa won).

In tournaments, he tied for 9-10th at Warsaw 1947 (Svetozar Gligorić won), took 18th at Szczawno Zdrój (Salzbrunn) 1950 (Paul Keres won), and tied for 15-16th at Międzyzdroje 1952 (Zdravko Milev and Ion Bălănel won).

He represented Poland in the 10th Chess Olympiad at Helsinki 1952, winning the silver medal at second reserve board (+5 –1 =4) there. He also played for Poland in friendly matches: POL–CSR at Katowice 1949, POL–HUN at Warsaw 1949, and POL–HUN–GDR at Görlitz 1952.

== See also ==
- Sports in Israel
