= Lidia Gal =

Israeli chess player

Personal information
- Native name: לידיה גל
- Born: unknown

Chess career
- Country: Israel

Lidia Gal (Hebrew: לידיה גל) is an Israeli chess player. She is a winner the Israeli Women's Chess Championship (1971).

== Biography ==
From the early 1970s to the early 1980s, Lidia Gal was one of Israel's leading female chess players. In 1971, she won Israeli Women's Chess Championship.

Lidia Gal played for Israel in the Women's Chess Olympiads:

- In 1972, at second board in the 5th Chess Olympiad (women) in Skopje (+4, =4, -0),
- In 1982, at third board in the 10th Chess Olympiad (women) in Lucerne (+2, =4, -3).
