= Uzi Geller =

Israeli chess player (1931–2024)

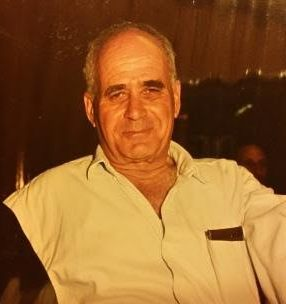

Uzi Geller (Hebrew: עוזי גלר; 27 January 1931 – 2 June 2024) was an Israeli chess master.

Geller was Israeli Champion in 1971–72. He tied for 7–10th at Netanya 1968 (Bobby Fischer won), tied for 9–10th at Netanya 1969 (Samuel Reshevsky won), took 16th at Netanya 1971 (Lubomir Kavalek and Bruno Parma won), and tied for 6–7th at Teheran 1972 (West Asian zonal, Shimon Kagan won). Geller died on 2 June 2024, at the age of 93.

Geller twice represented Israel in Chess Olympiads:

- In 1970, at fourth board in 19th Chess Olympiad in Siegen (+5 –3 =4);
- In 1972, at third board in 20th Chess Olympiad in Skopje (+1 –5 =1).
