= Ludmila Tsifanskaya =

Israeli chess player

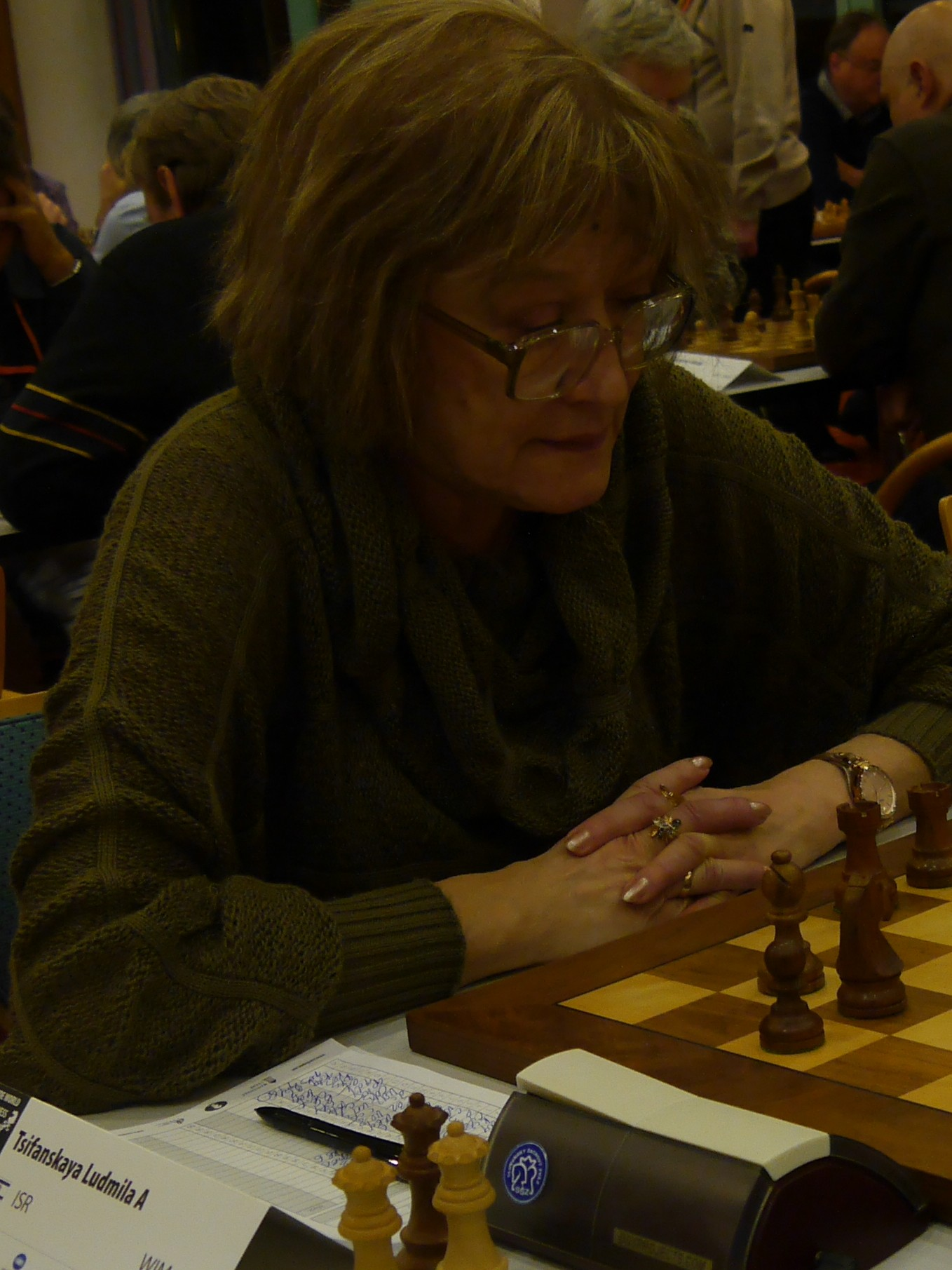
Ludmila Tsifanskaya (2016)

Ludmila Tsifanskaya (Hebrew: לודמילה ציפנסקיה; born 1949) is a chess player holding the title of Woman International Master.

She won the Belarusian women's chess championship in 1978, and the Israeli women's chess championship in 1994 and 1996.

She also played for Israel in the 32nd Chess Olympiad.
