= Ronen Lev =

Israeli chess player (born 1968)

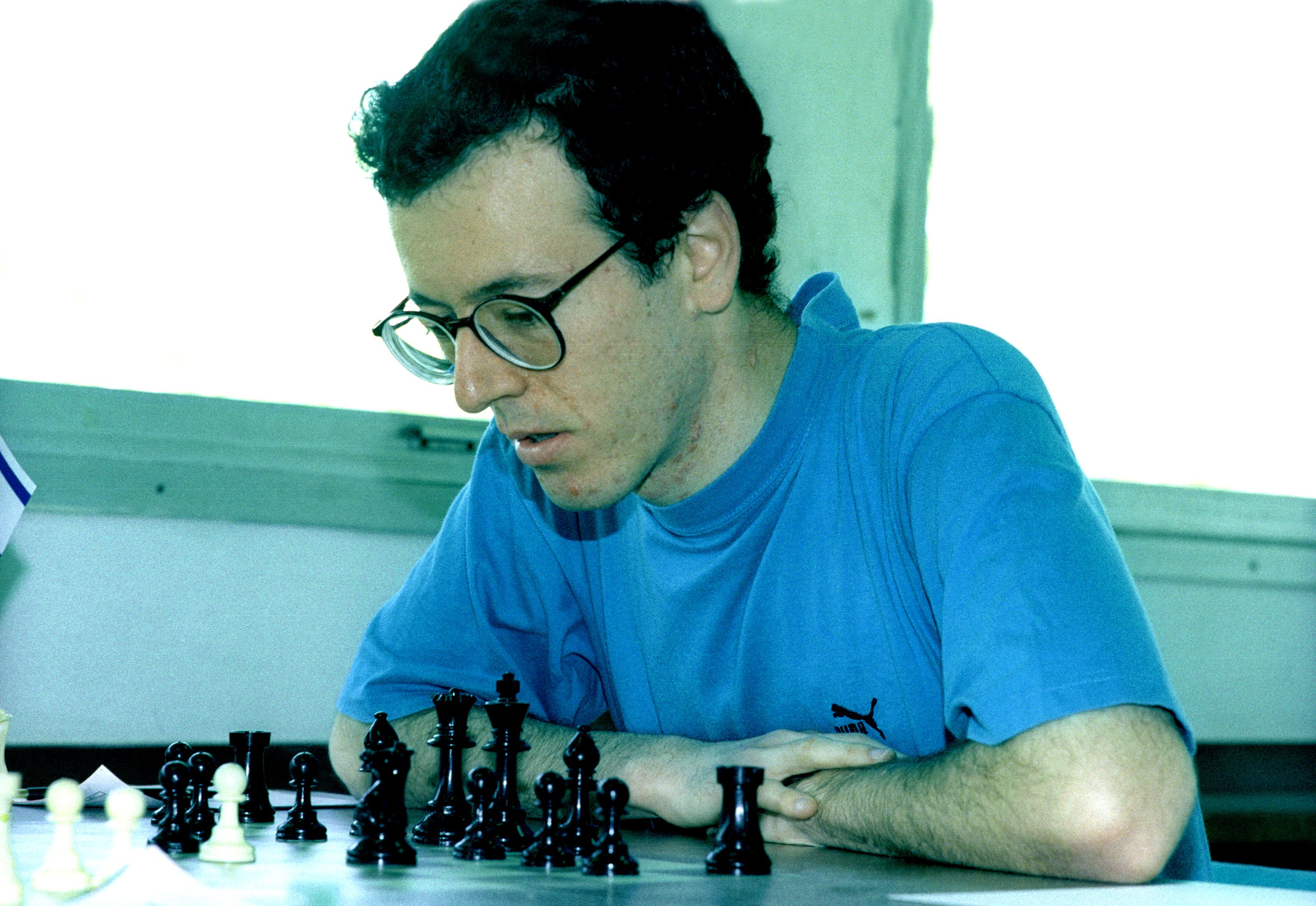

Personal information
- Native name: רונן לב
- Born: October 22, 1968 (age 57) Tel Aviv, Israel

Chess career
- Country: Israel
- Title: Grandmaster (1994)
- FIDE rating: 2350 (July 2025)
- Peak rating: 2505 (January 1995)

Ronen Lev (born September 22, 1968) is an Israeli chess grandmaster.

Lev was the Israeli Youth Champion in 1984 and 1987. He earned the FM title in 1987, the IM title in 1988, and the GM title in 1994. He received a GM norm at the 15th Lloyds Bank Masters in London.

In 1988, he played for the only time in his career at the Chess Olympiad.

He won the Israeli Chess Championship in 1984 and 1987, finished second in 1990, and third in 1992.
