= Boris Avrukh =

Israeli-American chess grandmaster (born 1978)

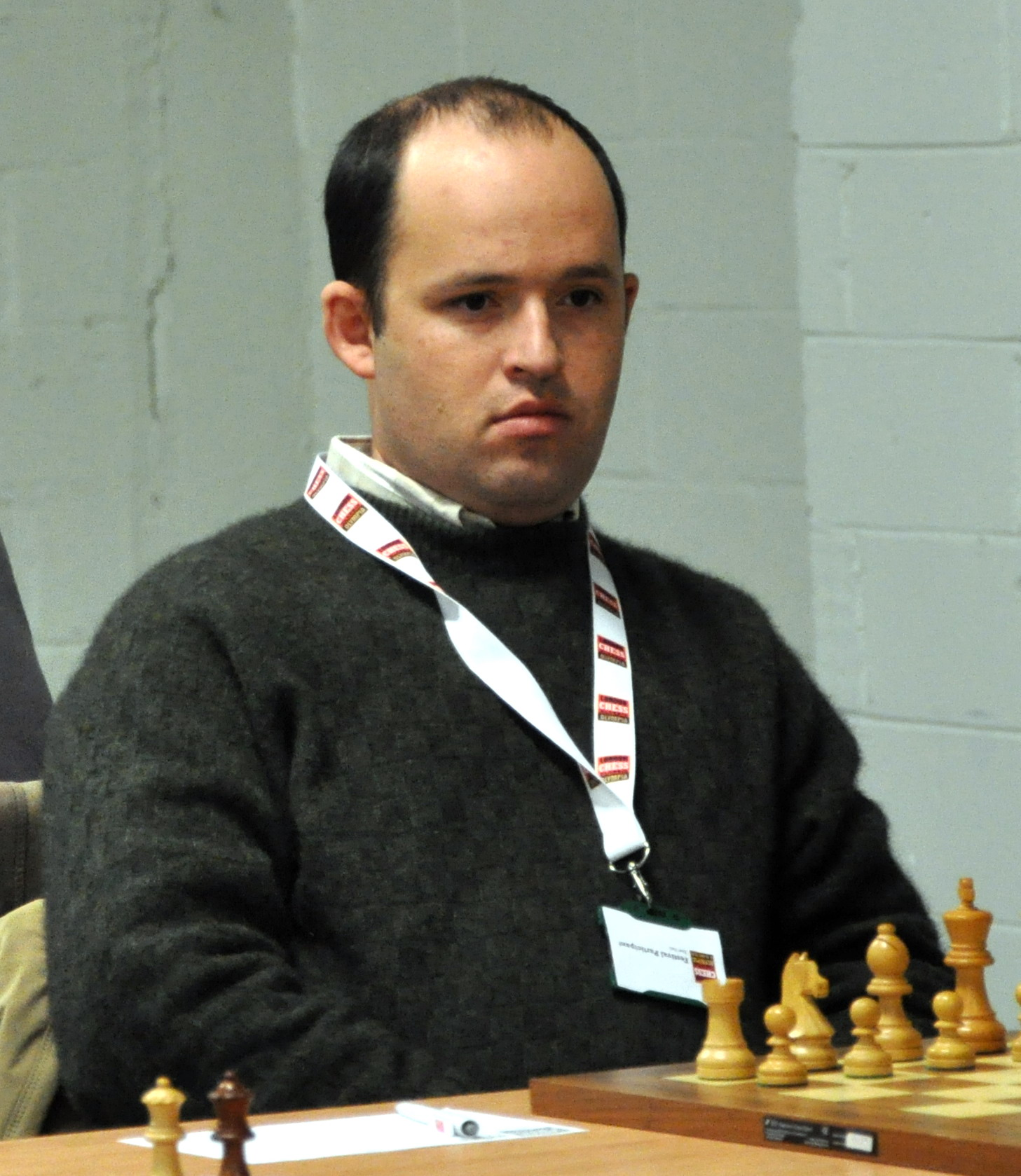

Personal information
- Born: February 10, 1978 (age 48) Kazakh SSR, Soviet Union

Chess career
- Country: Soviet Union → Kazakhstan (until 1995); Israel (1995–2025); United States (since 2025)
- Title: Grandmaster (1997)
- FIDE rating: 2567 (September 2026)
- Peak rating: 2668 (September 2009)
- Peak ranking: No. 50 (July 2005)

Boris Leonidovich Avrukh (Hebrew: בוריס אברוך, Russian: Борис Леонидович Аврух; born 10 February 1978) is an Israeli and American chess grandmaster, author, and businessman. Avrukh has published several books, including The Classical Slav. He was the World Under-12 champion in 1990. He was born in Soviet Kazakhstan.

== Books Published ==
1. Grandmaster Repertoire: 1.d4 Volume 1A – The Catalan
2. Grandmaster Repertoire: 1.d4 Volume 1B – The Queen’s Gambit
3. Grandmaster Repertoire: 1.d4 Volume 2
4. Grandmaster Repertoire 2B: 1.d4 Dynamic Systems
5. Grandmaster Repertoire 11: Beating 1.d4 Sidelines
6. Grandmaster Repertoire 17: The Classical Slav
7. Grandmaster Repertoire 8: The Grünfeld Defence Volume 1
8. Grandmaster Repertoire 9: The Grünfeld Defence Volume 2
9. 1.d4: King’s Indian & Grünfeld – Volume 2A
10. 1.d4: Dynamic Defences

== Chess career ==
Boris Avrukh has played six times for Israel in Chess Olympiads.

- In 1998, at second reserve board at the 33rd Chess Olympiad in Elista (+7 –1 =2);
- In 2000, at third board at the 34th Chess Olympiad in Istanbul (+5 –2 =4);
- In 2002, at first reserve board at the 35th Chess Olympiad in Bled (+3 –3 =3);
- In 2004, at fourth board at the 36th Chess Olympiad in Calvià (+5 –0 =5);
- In 2006, at fourth board at the 37th Chess Olympiad in Turin (+6 –1 =3).
- In 2008, at second/third boards at the 38th Chess Olympiad in Dresden (+2 –2 =4).
- In 2012, at the reserve board at the 40th Chess Olympiad in Istanbul (+4 –2 =4)

He won individual gold medal at Elista 1998 and bronze medal at Turin 2006. He won a team silver medal at Dresden 2008.

In 1999, he tied for 5–6th with Alexander Huzman in Tel Aviv (Boris Gelfand, Ilia Smirin, and Lev Psakhis won). In 2000, he tied for 1st-2nd with Huzman in Biel and took 6th in Haifa (Wydra Tournament; Viswanathan Anand won). In 2001, he won in Biel. In 2004, he tied for 8–9th in Beer Sheva Rapid (Viktor Korchnoi won). In 2009 he tied for first with Alexander Areshchenko in the Zurich Jubilee Open tournament.

Avrukh has twice won the Israeli Chess Championship; in 2000 (tied with Alik Gershon) and 2008. He took part in the FIDE World Chess Championship 2002, but was knocked out in the first round by Bartłomiej Macieja.

He cites Garry Kasparov as his favourite player of all time "for his powerful style and killer instinct."
