= Ronen Har-Zvi =

Israeli chess player and writer (born 1976)

Personal information
- Native name: רונן הר-צבי
- Born: October 13, 1976 (age 49)

Chess career
- Country: Israel
- Title: Grandmaster (1995)
- FIDE rating: 2513 (August 2026)
- Peak rating: 2535 (July 1995)

Ronen Har-Zvi (Hebrew: רונן הר-צבי; born 13 October 1976) is an Israeli chess player and writer. Har-Zvi won the under-16 title at the World Youth Chess Champion in 1992. He has held the title of Grandmaster of chess since 1995.

== Biography ==
Growing up in Israel, Har-Zvi was taught to play chess at the age of 5 by his grandfather.

In 2008, Har-Zvi finished second in the "Ciudad de Dos Hermanas", the largest online chess tournament in the world. Har-Zvi lost 3.5-0.5 in the final to the untitled Jorge Sammour-Hasbun.

Har-Zvi is a regular expert commentator, host and teacher on the Internet Chess Club. He also operates an account, "Indiana-Jones", with a peak rating of 3215 for blitz chess and 2947 for bullet chess. He is a columnist for CHESS magazine.

Aside from chess, Har-Zvi works as a stock trader. He lived in Saratoga, New York, with his wife Heather, whom he met online at the Internet Chess Club, and their child. In 2010, Har-Zvi became head chess coach at the University of Texas at Brownsville, and moved with his family to Brownsville, Texas. He replaced Grandmaster Gilberto Hernández Guerrero, who had resigned from that position for personal reasons. After more than two years of coaching the University of Texas Brownsville team, Har-Zvi left for the Greater Boston area to pursue other chess-related endeavors, and in 2013 he moved back to Israel.

== Notable games ==
=== Vladimir Kramnik - Ronen Har-Zvi, Oakham 1992. ===
1. d4 Nf6 2. c4 g6 3. Nc3 Bg7 4. e4 d6 5. f3 O-O 6. Be3 c5 7. Nge2 Nc6 8. d5 Ne5 9. Ng3 e6 10. Be2 exd5 11. cxd5 a6 12. O-O b5 13. a3 Rb8 14. b4 Nfd7 15. Qb3 Nb6 16. Bf2 cxb4 17. axb4 h5 18. Rfc1 Qf6 19. Nf1 h4 20. Qd1 Nbc4 21. Ra2 a5 22. bxa5 b4 23. Rb1 Ba6 24. Na4 b3 25. Rxb3 Rxb3 26. Qxb3 Nxa5 27. Qd1 Bxe2 28. Qxe2 h3 29. Nb6 Nb3 30. Ra3 hxg2 31. Rxb3 gxf1=Q+ 32. Kxf1 Rb8 33. Qe3 Qd8 34. h3 g5 35. Ke2 Ng6 36. Kd2 Nf4 37. h4 Nh3 38. Be1 gxh4 39. f4 1/2–1/2
