= Dov Zifroni =

Israeli chess grandmaster (born 1976)

Personal information
- Native name: דב צפרוני
- Born: February 17, 1976 (age 50) Herzliya, Israel

Chess career
- Country: Israel
- Title: Grandmaster (1999)
- FIDE rating: 2450 (November 2026)
- Peak rating: 2552 (July 2003)

Dov Zifroni (Hebrew: דב צפרוני; born 17 February 1976) is an Israeli chess Grandmaster.

== Career ==
Zifroni was awarded the International Master (IM) title in 1993 and became a Grandmaster (GM) in 1999. He achieved his second GM norm by winning the Moshe Czerniak Memorial in 1998, and earned his final norm by winning the 15th Moshe Czerniak Memorial in Tel Aviv the following year.

In team events, Zifroni represented the Herzliya Chess Club at the European Club Cup in 1997, 2001, and 2007. During the 1997 tournament in Kazan, he achieved a rating performance of 2651. Playing on board one, he also led the Tel Aviv University team to victory at the 9th Israeli University Championship in 2005.

His peak Elo rating was 2552 in July 2003, when he was ranked 10th in Israel.

=== Tournament results ===
- 1997: Tied for 1st–4th place at the Czerniak Memorial (Bikurei Haitim).
- 1998: 1st place at the Moshe Czerniak Memorial (achieving his 2nd GM norm).
- 1999: 1st place at the 15th Moshe Czerniak Memorial in Tel Aviv (achieving his final GM norm).
- 2000: Tied for 2nd–3rd place in Herzliya.
- 2009: Tied for 1st–3rd place at the Sluzky Leonid Memorial in Herzliya.
