= Olga Gutmakher =

Israeli chess player

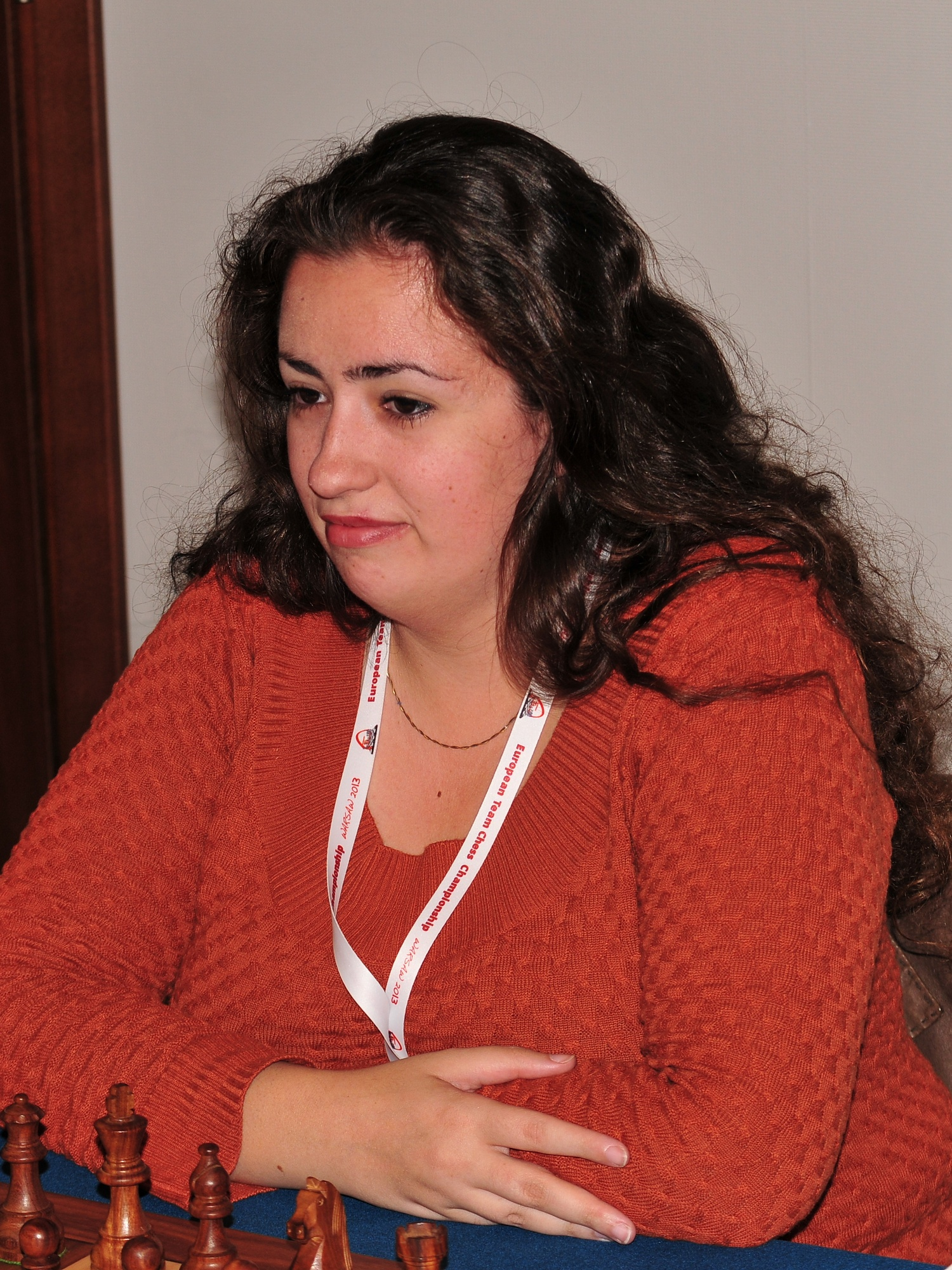
- Gutmakher in 2008

Personal information
- Native name: אולגה גוטמאכר
- Born: 9 February 1987 (age 39)

Chess career
- Country: Israel
- Title: Woman International Master (2004)
- FIDE rating: 2236 (December 2021)
- Peak rating: 2307 (November 2010)

Olga Gutmakher (née Vasiliev, Hebrew: אולגה גוטמאכר; born 9 February 1987) is an Israeli chess player and engineer who holds the FIDE title of Woman International Master (WIM, 2004). She is a three-time Israeli Women's Chess Championship winner (2008, 2013, 2014), a Women's Chess Olympiad individual bronze medal winner (2010), and a European Women's Team Chess Championship individual bronze medal winner (2009).

== Biography ==
She grew up in Ashdod. In 1998, she won Israeli Youth Chess Championship in U14 girls' age group. In 2002, she won Israeli Youth Chess Championship in U15 girls' age group. In 2003, she won Israeli Youth Chess Championship in U16 girls' age group. Olga Gutmakher is three times Israeli Women's Chess Championship winner: in 2008, 2013, and 2014.

Gutmakher played for Israel in the Women's Chess Olympiads:

- In 2004, at first reserve board in the 36th Chess Olympiad (women) in Calvià (+5, =3, -4),
- In 2008, at fourth board in the 38th Chess Olympiad (women) in Dresden (+7, =0, -2),
- In 2010, at fourth board in the 39th Chess Olympiad (women) in Khanty-Mansiysk (+7, =0, -2) and won individual bronze medal,
- In 2014, at third board in the 41st Chess Olympiad (women) in Tromsø (+6, =3, -1),
- In 2016, at fourth board in the 42nd Chess Olympiad (women) in Baku (+7, =2, -2),
- In 2018, at fourth board in the 43rd Chess Olympiad (women) in Batumi (+7, =1, -2).

She played for Israel in the European Women's Team Chess Championships:

- In 2003, at first reserve board in the 5th European Team Chess Championship (women) in Plovdiv (+3, =2, -3),
- In 2005, at reserve board in the 6th European Team Chess Championship (women) in Gothenburg (+5, =2, -2),
- In 2007, at fourth board in the 7th European Team Chess Championship (women) in Heraklion (+4, =2, -1),
- In 2009, at fourth board in the 8th European Team Chess Championship (women) in Novi Sad (+2, =2, -3) and won individual bronze medal,
- In 2011, at reserve board in the 9th European Team Chess Championship (women) in Porto Carras (+2, =0, -3),
- In 2013, at third board in the 10th European Team Chess Championship (women) in Warsaw (+3, =2, -3).

Gutmakher graduated from Tel Aviv University as electrical engineering.
