= Jacob Murey =

Soviet-Israeli chess grandmaster (1941–2025)

Personal information
- Native name: Яков Мурей יעקב מוריי
- Born: 2 August 1941 Moscow, Russian SFSR, USSR
- Died: 9 September 2025 (aged 84)

Chess career
- Country: Israel
- Title: Grandmaster (1987)
- Peak rating: 2560 (January 1989)
- Peak ranking: No. 52 (January 1989)

Jacob Isaacovich Murey (Russian: Яков Исаакович Мурей, also transliterated Yakov Isaakovich Murei; Hebrew: יעקב מוריי; 2 August 1941 – 9 September 2025) was a Soviet-born Israeli chess player who held the chess titles of Grandmaster (1987) and Correspondence Chess International Master (1970). His peak rating was 2560 in 1989, ranking him world #52 at the time.

== Biography ==
Born in Moscow, Murey immigrated to Israel in 1977. He later settled in France, before returning to Israel. Murey died on 9 September 2025, at the age of 84.

== Chess career ==
In 1961, Murey tied for 6–7th in Moscow (USSR-ch students). In 1963, he took 12th in Moscow-ch. In 1965, he tied for 7–8th in Moscow (Central Chess Club-ch; Vladimir Liberzon won). In 1966, he tied for 1st with Nikitin in Moscow. In 1967, he tied for 4–7th in Moscow-ch. In 1967, he tied for 41–57th in Kharkov (35th USSR Championship; Lev Polugaevsky and Mikhail Tal won). In 1969, he took 10th in Moscow-ch (Igor Zaitsev won). In 1969, he took 15th in Voronezh (URS-ch sf). In 1970, he tied for 15–16th in Moscow-ch. In 1972, he tied for 6–8th in Sukhumi. In 1974, he tied for 5–7th in Tula. In 1975, he tied for 4–7th in Yalta. In 1978, he was one of Viktor Korchnoi's seconds in Baguio during a match for the World Chess Championship against Anatoly Karpov. In 1979, he tied for 1st–2nd with Balshan in Ramat Hasharon. In 1980, he took 2nd in Beer Sheva. In 1980, he took 2nd in Ramat Hasharon. In 1982, he won in Randers (zonal, group B). In 1982, he took 7th in Moscow (interzonal; Garry Kasparov won).

Murey played for Israel in three Chess Olympiads:

- In 1980, at fourth board in 24th Chess Olympiad in La Valletta (+6−4=1);
- In 1982, at second board in 25th Chess Olympiad in Lucerne (+6−4=3);
- In 1984, at first reserve board in 26th Chess Olympiad in Thessaloniki (+2−2=3).

In 1982/83, he tied for 3rd–4th in Hastings (Rafael Vaganian won). In 1983, he tied for 3rd–4th in Netanya (Miguel Quinteros won). In 1987, he tied for 2nd in Marseille. In 1987, he won in Seville. In 1988, he tied for 2nd–3rd with Zsuzsa Polgar, behind Korchnoi, in Royan. In 1997, he tied for 3–8th in Winnipeg (Julian Hodgson won).

Murey won 1st European Senior Championship at Saint Vincent 2001. He tied for 2nd–4th in 3rd Senior EU-ch 2003 (Sinisa Joksic won), and for 2nd–6th in 5th Senior EU-ch 2005 (Mark Tseitlin won). He also played for Israel in 1st World Senior Team Championship at Isle of Man 2004. He won gold team medal and was equal 1st with Wolfgang Uhlmann on first board there.

Murey was awarded the International Master of Correspondence Chess title in 1970, the International Master (IM) title in 1980, and the GM title in 1987.

In a 1993 game against Jan Timman, Murey debuted a surprising novelty in the Petrov's Defense, a temporary knight sacrifice with 4...Nc6!?. Though Murey lost the game, the discovery is considered sound, and is frequently referred to in opening databases as the Murrey [sic] Variation of the Modern Attack in the Petrov's defense.

== See also ==
- Sport in Israel
- Israeli Chess Championship
