= Raaphi Persitz =

Chess player (1934–2009)

Raaphi (Raaphy, Rafi, Raphael, Rafael) Joseph Arie Persitz (26 July 1934 – 4 February 2009) was an English–Israeli–Swiss chess master, financial analyst, financial journalist, and chess writer. Persitz was Israeli Junior Champion in 1951. He was born in Tel Aviv, Israel, then British Mandate of Palestine. He studied at Balliol College, Oxford, and represented Oxford University in the annual match against Cambridge University on three occasions (1954, 1955 and 1956). In 1954 he won his individual game in the Oxford-Cambridge match in the morning, playing very quickly in order to be able to travel by train to Swindon (some 75 miles away) in time to play top board for his county (Oxfordshire) against Gloucestershire in the afternoon. He was paired against a former British champion, Conel Hugh O'Donel Alexander, and managed to win this game as well.

Persitz played three times for England in the World Student Team Chess Championship.

- In 1954, at second board in 1st WST-ch in Oslo (+6 −0 =3);
- In 1956, at first board in 3rd WST-ch in Uppsala (+3 −1 =6);
- In 1957, at first board in 4th WST-ch in Reykjavík (+3 −6 =4).

He won the individual gold medal at Oslo 1954.

Persitz moved from the UK to Israel, and then to Switzerland. He played for Israel at fourth board in 14th Chess Olympiad at Leipzig 1960 (+6 −4 =2).

In 1955/56, he tied for 6-7th in Hastings (Viktor Korchnoi and Friðrik Ólafsson won). In 1958, he played in Haifa / Tel Aviv (Samuel Reshevsky won). In 1961, he tied for 7-8th in Netanya (Moshe Czerniak, Milan Matulović and Petar Trifunović won). In 1968/69, he tied for 8-10th in Hastings (Vasily Smyslov and Svetozar Gligorić won).

He was also a prolific chess writer, contributing articles to a long-running column in British Chess Magazine entitled The Student's Corner.

== Notable chess games ==
Persitz, Raaphi - Hübner, Robert Hastings, 1968 1.d4 Nf6 2.c4 g6 3.Nc3 Bg7 4.e4 d6 5.f3 0-0 6.Be3 b6 7.Bd3 a6 8.Qd2 c5 9.d5 e6 10.Nge2 exd5 11.exd5 Nbd7 12.0-0 Ne5 13.b3 Nxd3 14.Qxd3 b5 15.Rae1 Qa5 16.Ng3 Rb8 17.Bd2 Qb6 18.Nce4 Nxe4 19.fxe4 a5 20.Bc3 bxc4 21.bxc4 Bxc3 22.Qxc3 Qb2 23.Qxa5 Qd4+ 24.Kh1 Rb2 25.e5 Qxc4 26.e6 Qb4 27.Qc7 Ba6 28.Qxf7+ 1-0
