= Tamir Nabaty =

Israeli chess grandmaster (born 1991)

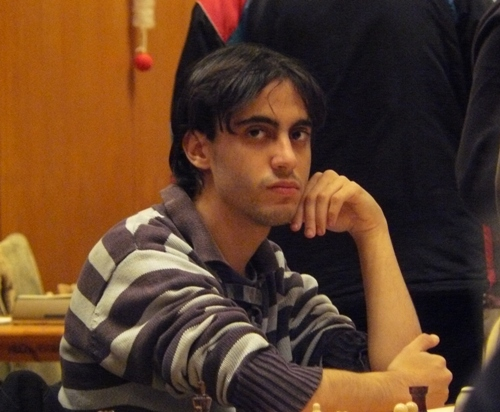
- Tamir Nabaty in 2010

Personal information
- Native name: תמיר נבאתי
- Born: 4 May 1991 (age 35) Ness Ziona, Israel

Chess career
- Country: Israel
- Title: Grandmaster (2011)
- FIDE rating: 2613 (November 2026)
- Peak rating: 2697 (March 2019)
- Peak ranking: No. 46 (March 2019)

Tamir Nabaty (Hebrew: תמיר נבאתי; born 4 May 1991) is an Israeli chess Grandmaster and a four-time national chess champion (2013, 2016, 2019, 2021). During his peak ranking in March 2019, Tamir ranked 46th in the world according to the chess rating.

== Chess achievements ==
- From 2003 to 2011, Tamir consistently won the Israeli Youth Championships by age group.
- 2010 - Won the Open tournament in Albena, Bulgaria, after scoring 7 points out of 9.
- 2010 - Second place in Bansko, Bulgaria, with 7.5 points out of 9.
- 2010 - Second place in the Israel Championship held in Haifa, with 6.5 points out of 9.
- 2011 - Second place in Chennai open, India, after scoring 9 out of 11.
- 2012 - Won the main event in Pardubice, Czech Republic, with 7.5 points out of 9.
- 2012 - Won the Belgrade Trophy in Serbia, after scoring 7.5 points out of 9.
- 2013 - Won the Kavala Open, Greece, with a score of 6.5 points out of 9.
- 2013 - Won the Israeli Chess Championship for the first time in Acre, Israel with 6.5/9.
- 2015 - Participated in the Chess World Cup 2015, held in Baku, Azerbaijan.
- 2016 - Scored 8.5 points out of 10 on Israel's third board at the 42nd Chess Olympiad.
- 2016 - Won the Israeli Championship for the second time, held in Tiberias with 6/9.
- 2017 - Finished in third place in the RTU Open, Latvia, after scoring 7 points out of 9.
- 2018 - Achieved a score of 9 points out of 10 in the first-second board in the Israeli League.
- 2018 - Finished in 9th place at the European Championship held in Batumi, Georgia, after scoring 7.5 points out of 11.
- 2018 - Finished in second place at the Moscow Open, Russia, after scoring 7.5 points out of 9.
- 2019 - Won the Israeli Open Championship Held in Jerusalem with a score of 7.5/9
- 2019 - Participated in the Chess World Cup 2019, held in Khanty-Mansiysk, Russia.
- 2019 - Won the bronze medal in the fourth board at the European Club Cup held in Montenegro.
- 2019 - Won the Rilton Cup in Stockholm, Sweden, with a score of 8 points out of 9.
- 2021 - Won the gold medal in the second board of the European Club Cup held in Macedonia.
- 2021 - Won the Israeli Open Championship held in Safed after scoring 7.5 points out of 9.
- 2023 - Achieved a score of 8.5 points out of 11 in the first-second board in the Czech Extraliga.
- 2023 - Won the silver medal in Israel's third board in the European Team Championship held in Montenegro.

Tamir won achievements in many other competitions as well.

== Team Achievements ==
- 7 wins in the Israel State Championship with Beer Sheva club.
- 4 wins in the Israel State Cup with Beer Sheva club.
- 1 win in the Israel State Cup with Kfar Saba club.
- 1 win in the Czech State Championship with Lysa Nad Labem club.

== Received ranks ==
- 2010 - International Master
- 2011 - Grandmaster

== Participation in Chess Olympiads ==
Nabaty represented Israel in 4 Chess Olympiads.

Year	Table	Rating	Points	Results	%	Place
2016	3	2630	8.5 out of 10	7+ 3= 0-	85.0	27 Team, 6 Individual
2018	3	2690	4.5 out of 8	4+ 1= 3-	56.2	39 Team
2022	2	2631	5 out of 9	3+ 4= 2-	55.6	16 team
2024	3	2630	6 out of 10	5+ 2= 3-	60.0	57 team
