= Nathan Birnboim =

Israeli chess player

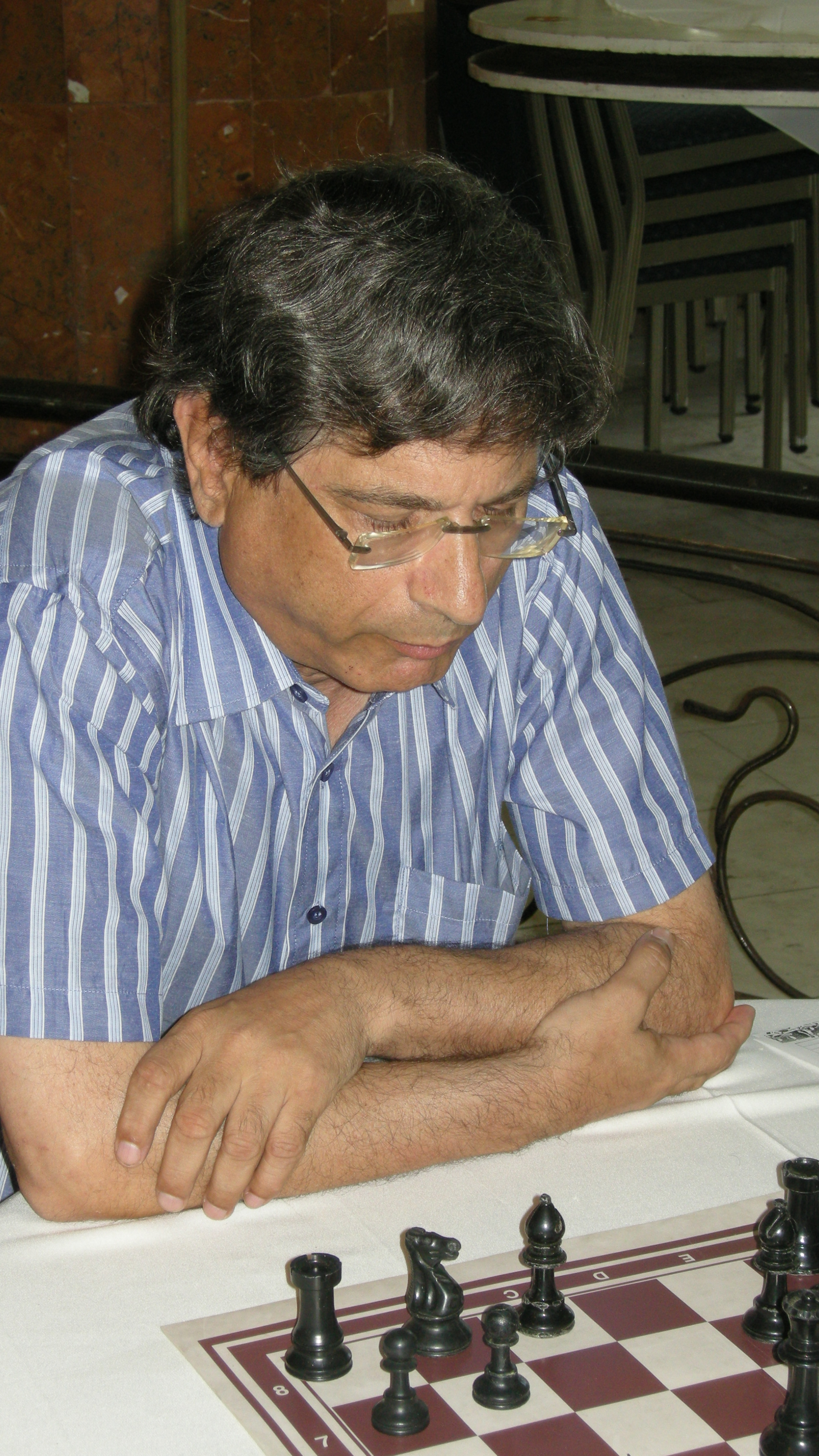

Personal information
- Native name: נתן בירנבוים
- Born: November 27, 1950 (age 75) Tel Aviv, Israel

Chess career
- Country: Israel
- Title: International Master (1978)
- Peak rating: 2465 (January 1978)

Nathan Birnboim (Hebrew: נתן בירנבוים; born 27 November 1950, in Tel Aviv) is an Israeli chess International master.

Birnboim played for Israel in five Chess Olympiads.

- In 1976, at second reserve board in 22nd Olympiad in Haifa (+2 -1 =3);
- In 1978, at first reserve board in 23rd Olympiad in Buenos Aires (+4 -0 =4);
- In 1980, at second board in 24th Olympiad in La Valletta (+3 -4 =4);
- In 1982, at fourth board in 25th Olympiad in Lucerne (+4 -1 =3);
- In 1982, at fourth board in 26th Olympiad in Thessaloniki (+2 -2 =3).

He won individual silver medal at Buenos Aires 1978.

He was Israeli Champion in 1976, 1980 and 1986. He played twice in zonal tournaments: at Randers 1982, he took 11th place and at Munich 1987 he took 4th place. In 1986, he took 5th in Jerusalem.

He won the bronze medal in the European Seniors championship 2019.

Birnboim was awarded the International Master (IM) title in 1978.

He is the CEO of a digital marketing company since 1998.

== Notable games ==
- Nathan Birnboim vs Roman Dzindzichashvili, Nathanya (Israel) 1977, King's Indian Defense: Orthodox Variation, (E91), 1-0
- Nathan Birnboim vs Larry Christiansen, Lucerne (Switzerland) 1982, Catalan Opening: General (E00), 1-0
- Nathan Birnboim vs Viktor Korchnoi, Jerusalem, 1986, Catalan Opening: General (E00), 1-0
