= Clara Friedman =

Israeli chess player

Personal information
- Native name: קלרה פרידמן
- Born: 13 April 1920 Oradea, Romania
- Died: 14 October 2015 (aged 95) Jerusalem, Israel

Chess career
- Country: Romania; Israel
- Title: Woman International Master (1966)

Clara Friedman (Hebrew: קלרה פרידמן; born 13 April 1920, died 14 October 2015), née Klara Hodosi, was an Israeli chess player who held the title of Woman International Master (WIM, 1966). She was a three-time winner of the Israel Women's Chess Championship (1961, 1963, 1965).

== Biography ==
Born in Romania, she lived in Israel from 1961. In the 1960s Clara Friedman was one of the leading Israeli women chess players. She won the Israel Women's Chess Championship three times, in 1961, 1963, and 1965. In 1966, she was awarded the FIDE Woman International Master (WIM) title. In 1967, Clara Friedman participated in the Women's World Chess Championship Candidates Tournament in Subotica, Serbia and finished in 17th place.

== Literature ==
- Игорь Бердичевский. Шахматная еврейская энциклопедия. Москва: Русский шахматный дом, 2016 (Igor Berdichevsky. The Chess Jewish Encyclopedia. Moscow: Russian Chess House, 2016, p. 270) ISBN 978-5-94693-503-6
