= Izak Aloni =

Israeli chess player (1905–1985)

Personal information
- Native name: יצחק אלוני
- Born: Izak Schächter; 5 April 1905 Buchach, Galicia (Austria–Hungary)
- Died: 1985 (aged c. 80) Tel Aviv, Israel

Chess career
- Country: Israel

Izak (Izhak, Itzchak) Aloni (Schächter) (Hebrew: יצחק אלוני; 5 April 1905 – 2 June 1985) was an Israeli chess master.

== Biography ==
Aloni, born Schächter in Buchach, Galicia (then Austria-Hungary), was twice Lvov (Lemberg, Lwów, Lviv) champion (1936, 1939), and four-times Lvov sub-champion (1931, 1932, 1933, 1938). He played twice in Polish championships. In 1935, he tied for 12–14th in Warsaw (3rd POL-ch; Savielly Tartakower won). In 1937, he took 19th in Jurata (4th POL-ch; Tartakower won). In 1938, he won in Kraków (POL-ch elim.).

During World War II, he played in Lviv (then in USSR); took 9th in March 1940 ("West Ukrainian" championship, Abram Khavin won), tied for 3rd-5th in August 1940 ("Spartak" Club, Edward Gerstenfeld won), and tied for 4–5th in the Lviv City championship in March 1941 (Gerstenfeld won). In June 1941, when the German-Soviet War broke out, he as a former Soviet militiaman was sent to Kazakhstan. On September 15, 1941, he was recruited to the 13th Infantry Regiment of the 8th Infantry Division of the Polish Army (commander General Władysław Anders). In August 1942, Anders Army was evacuated to Iran. He served in the Polish Armed Forces in the East (Iran, Iraq, Palestine) till January 25, 1945. Finally, he settled in Israel.

After the war, he was Israeli champion in 1945, 1961, and 1965. He also played several times in the Tel Aviv City championships. He took 2nd in 1951, and tied for 2nd-4th in 1952, both after Menachem Oren.

Aloni played for Israel in six Chess Olympiads.

- In 1952, on fourth board at the 10th Chess Olympiad in Helsinki (+6 –3 =1).
- In 1954, on fourth board at the 11th Chess Olympiad in Amsterdam (+9 –3 =5).
- In 1956, on third board at the 12th Chess Olympiad in Moscow (+8 –5 =4).
- In 1958, on third board at the 13th Chess Olympiad in Munich (+6 –5 =4).
- In 1960, on third board at the 14th Chess Olympiad in Leipzig (+7 –4 =4).
- In 1962, on second board at the 15th Chess Olympiad in Varna (+3 –6 =5).

He remained a strong player well into his 60's. In international tournaments, he tied for 4–5th at Haifa 1958 (Samuel Reshevsky won), shared 2nd at Tel Aviv 1960, took 9th in Netanya 1961 (Milan Matulović, Petar Trifunović and Moshe Czerniak won), tied for 6–8th at Tel Aviv 1964, took 10th at Netanya 1964, won at Tel Aviv 1965, tied for 11–14th in Tel Aviv 1966 (Svetozar Gligorić won), and tied for 12–13th in Netanya 1968 (Robert James Fischer won).

== Notable chess games ==
- Gerhard Pfeiffer vs Izak Aloni, Munich 1958, 13th Olympiad, Semi-Slav Defense, Chigorin Variation, D46, 0-1
- Bogdan Śliwa vs Izak Aloni, Tel Aviv 1966, English Opening, Symmetrical Variation, A30, 0-1
- Izak Aloni vs Moshe Czerniak, ISR-ch 1967, Modern Defense, Averbakh System, A42, 1-0
