= Bella Gesser =

Israeli chess player

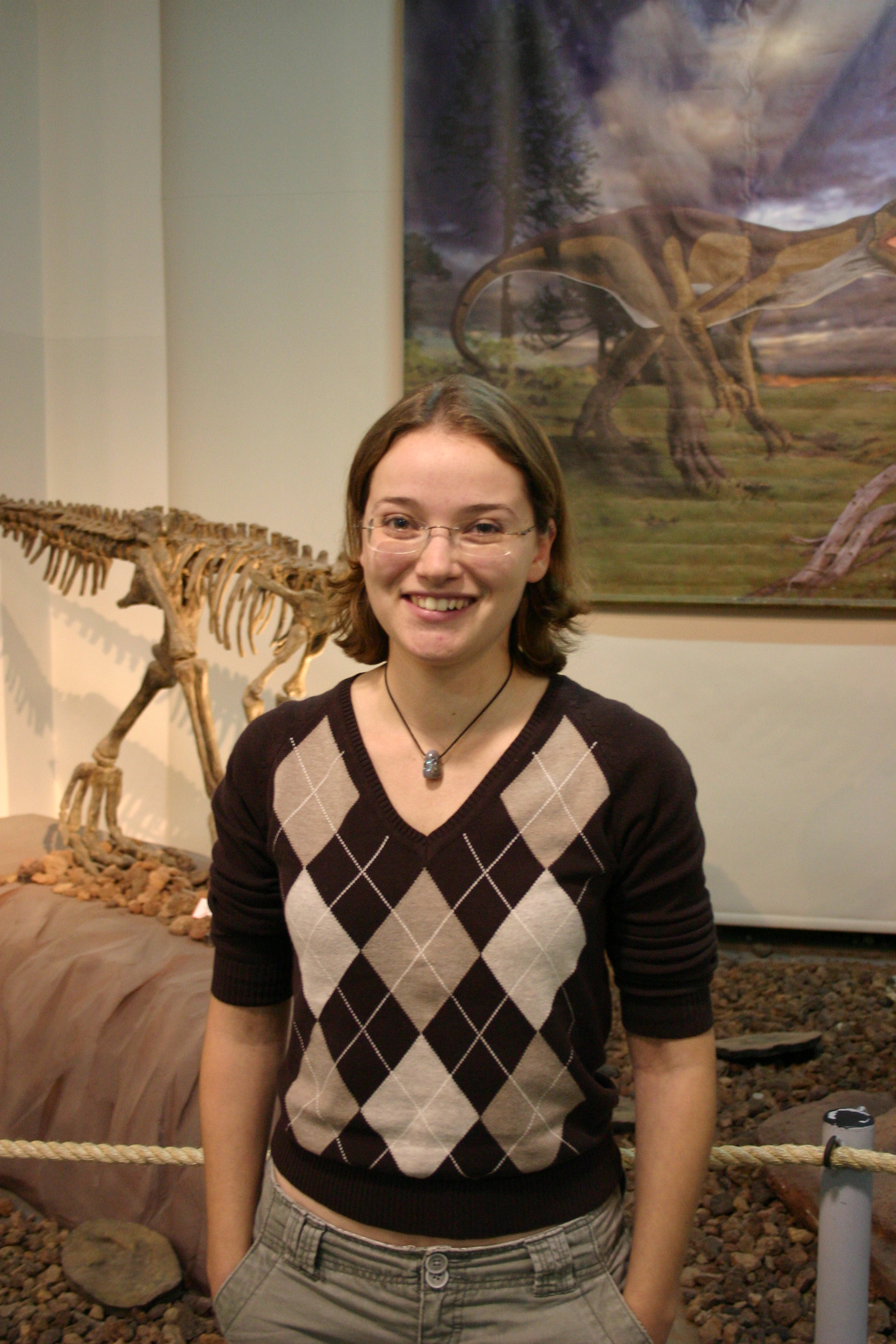
- Israeli Championship Finals, December 2008

Personal information
- Native name: בלה גסר
- Born: June 2, 1985 (age 41) Tambov, Soviet Union

Chess career
- Country: Russia; Israel
- Title: Woman Grandmaster (2004)
- FIDE rating: 2284 (July 2015)
- Peak rating: 2299 (July 2005)

Bella Gesser (Hebrew: בלה גסר), née Igla (Hebrew: בלה איגלה; Russian: Белла Игла; born June 2, 1985), is an Israeli chess player holding the title of Woman Grandmaster (WGM). In 2004, she won the Israel Women's Chess Championship.

Igla started her career at the Russian Chess Federation, playing in competitions including the Russian Youth Chess Championship (ru), in the categories U12 and U16. She moved to Israel in 1998. Igla transferred national federations from Russia to Israel in 2001.

Igla represented Israel in three Chess Olympiads:

- The 36th Chess Olympiad in 2004, Calvià, Spain, at board 3, with a 69% result (+6 =6 −1).
- The 37th Chess Olympiad in 2006, Turin, Italy, at board 3, with a 59% result (+5 =3 −3).
- The 38th Chess Olympiad in 2008, Dresden, Germany, playing at the second/third boards. She achieved an 80% result (+8 =0 −2), helping her country arrive at the ninth place in the women's competition.
