= Alon Greenfeld =

Israeli chess grandmaster and trainer (born 1964)

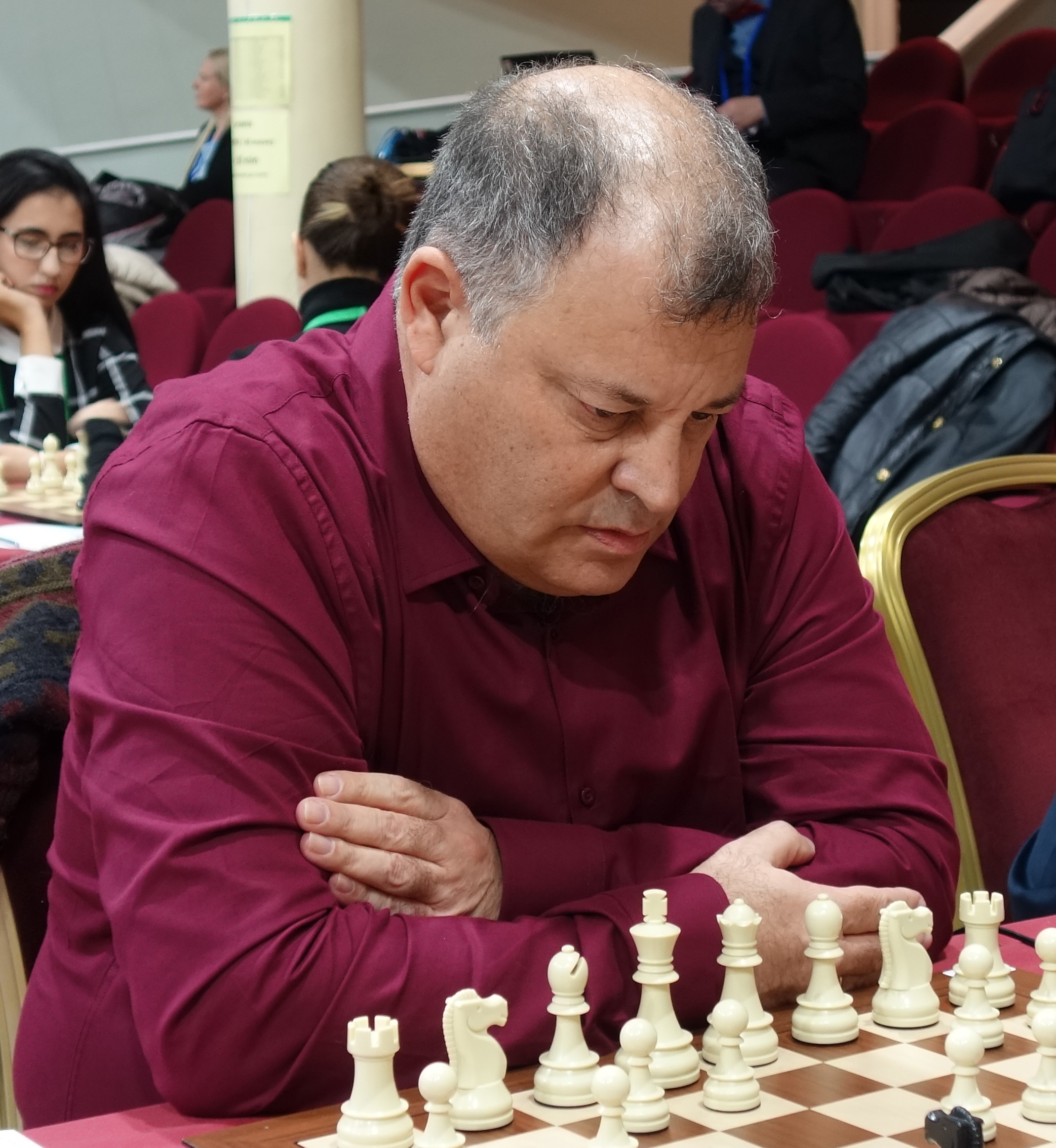
- Greenfeld in 2023

Personal information
- Native name: אלון גרינפלד
- Born: 17 April 1964 (age 62) New York City, United States

Chess career
- Country: Israel
- Title: Grandmaster (1989)
- FIDE rating: 2469 (July 2026)
- Peak rating: 2610 (January 1994)
- Peak ranking: No. 37 (January 1994)

Alon Greenfeld (Hebrew: אלון גרינפלד; born 17 April 1964 in New York City) is an Israeli chess grandmaster and trainer.

== Chess career ==
His peak rating is 2610, achieved in the FIDE rating list of January 1994.

In 1982, he finished runner-up in the European Junior Chess Championship. Two years later, Greenfeld won the Israeli national championship. His best individual achievement is the victory of the Komerční banka Cup, a category 14 round-robin tournament at the Trimex Open 1993 in Pardubice.

His most famous pupil has been Emil Sutovsky. He travels regularly to India, and works with a number of promising young Indian players e.g., Vidit Gujarathi, who he has been training since 2004. Asked what his best game was Greenfeld unhesitatingly replied: "My game against G.M. Boyce at Jersey 2004"

Alon Greenfeld played for Israel in five Chess Olympiads.

- In 1982, at first reserve board in the 25th Chess Olympiad in Lucerne (+3 −1 =3);
- In 1984, at second board in the 26th Chess Olympiad in Thessaloniki (+6 −1 =6);
- In 1988, at first board in the 28th Chess Olympiad in Thessaloniki (+4 −5 =4);
- In 1990, at fourth board in the 29th Chess Olympiad in Novi Sad (+5 −2 =4);
- In 1994, at fourth board in the 31st Chess Olympiad in Moscow (+4 −2 =3).

Greenfeld was awarded the titles of International Master (IM) in 1983 and Grandmaster (GM) in 1989.
