= Amikam Balshan =

Israeli chess player

Personal information
- Native name: עמיקם בלשן
- Born: May 3, 1948 (age 78)

Chess career
- Country: Israel
- Title: FIDE Master (1979)
- Peak rating: 2435 (July 1973)

Amikam Balshan (Hebrew: עמיקם בלשן; born 3 May 1948) is an Israeli chess master, who won the Israeli youth championship in 1965.

== Chess career ==
In 1967, Balshan played in the World Junior Chess Championship in Jerusalem, as Julio Kaplan won.

Balshan represented Israel six times in World Student Team Chess Championships (1968–1972, 1974) winning the individual gold medal on fourth board, scoring 10/11, at Ybbs 1968.

He played for Israel in the 20th Chess Olympiad at Skopje 1972, and won the individual silver medal at first reserve board (+10 –0 =6) there. He also represented Israel in the 7th European Team Chess Championship at Skara 1980.

In 1978/79, he took 15th in Hastings (Ulf Andersson won). He tied for 1st-2nd with Jacob Murey at Ramat Hasharon 1979, and shared 17th at Gausdal 1982 (Maxim Dlugy won).

== See also ==
- Sports in Israel
