= Ilan Manor =

Israeli academic

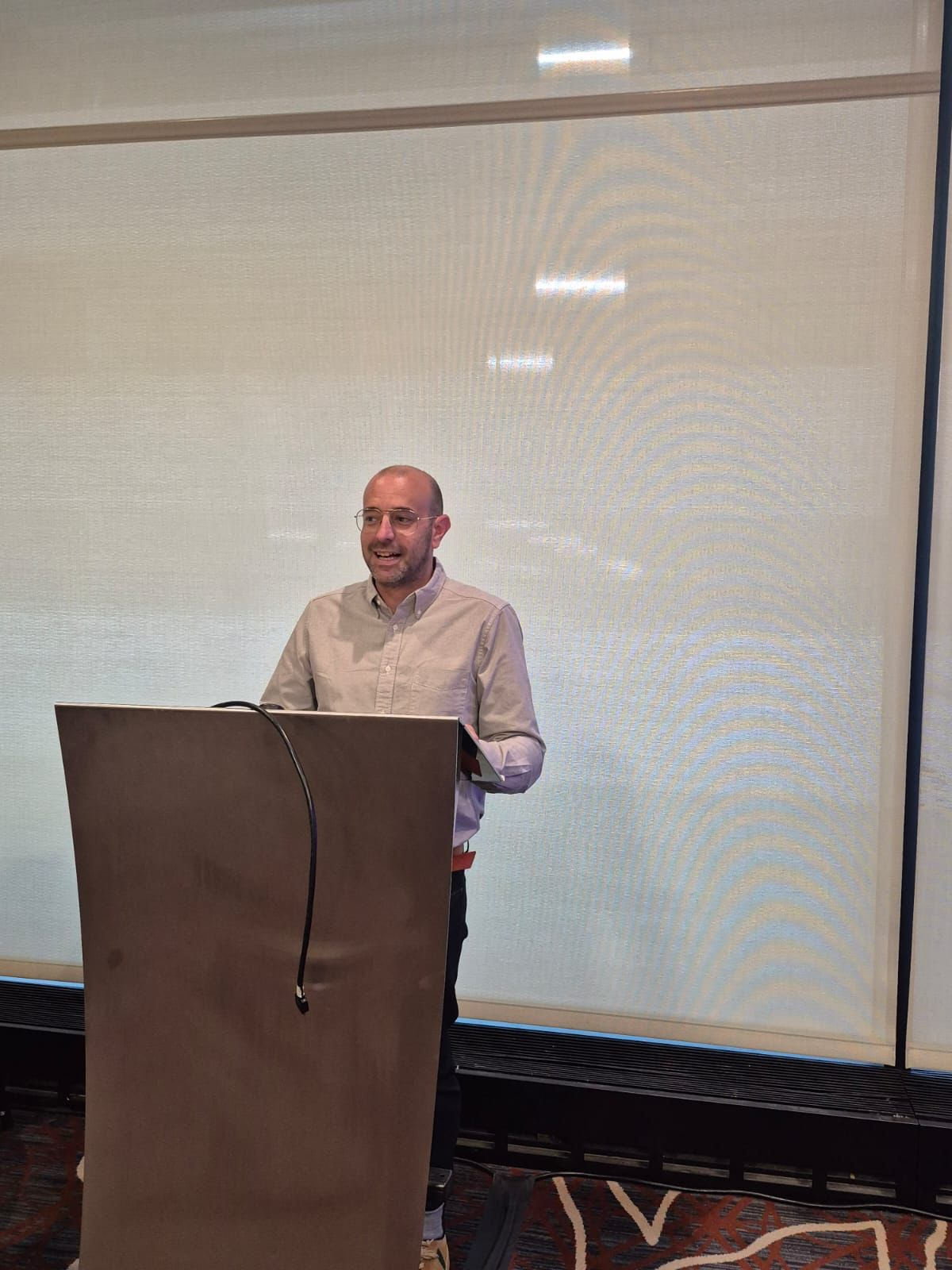

Ilan Manor (Hebrew: אילן מנור) is an Israeli scholar and Professor specializing in the study of digital diplomacy. He is a senior lecturer in the Department of Communication studies at Ben-Gurion University of the Negev. His research focuses on communication, artificial intelligence, and international relations. Manor is also a published author.

== Biography ==
Between 2016 and 2020, Manor served as a consultant to foreign ministries and international organizations seeking to implement digital diplomacy strategies. He served as a consultant for the foreign ministries of the United Kingdom, Germany, Denmark, Sweden, the United States, Greece, Estonia, and Israel, as well as United Nations institutions in New York City and Geneva.

In 2021, he received a postdoctoral fellowship from the Azrieli Foundation and became a research fellow at the Dan School of Communication at Tel Aviv University. In 2022, Manor was appointed as a Senior lecturer and faculty member in the Department of Communication Studies at Ben-Gurion University of the Negev.

Manor lives in Tel Aviv with his husband.

== Research ==
In 2019, Manor published his first book, The Digitalization of Public Diplomacy, in which he argued that diplomacy in general—and public diplomacy in particular—has undergone an accelerated process of digitalization. This process, he claimed, has reshaped the values, norms, and working procedures of diplomats and foreign ministries. In 2021, he edited the volume Public Diplomacy and the Politics of Uncertainty, which examined how digital technologies destabilize political systems and generate uncertainty in the realm of diplomacy. In 2024, he co-edited The Oxford Handbook of Digital Diplomacy, published by Oxford University Press.

Between 2015 and 2025, Manor published approximately 70 academic articles and book chapters. His work has explored a wide range of topics, including how diplomats use humor to convey messages on social media, how foreign ministries employ social platforms during times of peace and conflict, how diplomats use WhatsApp groups to coordinate positions and collaborate in international forums such as the UN, and how both diplomats and terrorist organizations use nostalgia and visual media in strategic communication.

Manor coined several key terms in the field, including Domestic Digital Diplomacy, The Digitalization of Diplomacy, Proactive Digitalization, Tech Diplomacy, and Un-nation Branding.

Since 2015, he has maintained a blog on digital diplomacy titled Exploring Digital Diplomacy. Beginning in 2025, he serves as editor of the academic journal Place Branding and Public Diplomacy.

== Books ==
- Manor, Ilan. The Digitalization of Public Diplomacy. Palgrave Macmillan, 2019.
- Manor, Ilan (Ed.). Public Diplomacy and the Politics of Uncertainty. Palgrave Macmillan, 2021.
- Manor, Ilan (Ed.). The Oxford Handbook of Digital Diplomacy. Oxford University Press, 2024.
