= Alik Gershon =

Israeli chess grandmaster (born 1980)

Personal information
- Native name: אליק גרשון
- Born: June 3, 1980 (age 46) Dnipropetrovsk, Ukraine

Chess career
- Country: Israel
- Title: Grandmaster (2000)
- FIDE rating: 2424 (July 2026)
- Peak rating: 2573 (January 2003)

Alik Gershon (Hebrew: אליק גרשון; born 3 June 1980, in Dnipropetrovsk, Ukraine) is an Israeli chess grandmaster. On 21 October 2010 he set the Guinness World Record for simultaneous games after playing 523 opponents in Tel Aviv. After 18 hours and 30 minutes, he won 454 games (86%), lost 11 and drew 58. On 9 February 2011 his record was broken by Iranian chess grandmaster Ehsan Ghaem-Maghami.

He was the World Under-14 champion in 1994 and World Under-16 champion in 1996. In 2000 he won the Israeli Chess Championship (tied with Boris Avrukh).

In 2007, his book San Luis 2005 (coauthored with Igor Nor) won the English Chess Federations Book of the Year award.
