= Dan Zoler =

Israeli chess Grandmaster and doctor (born 1974)

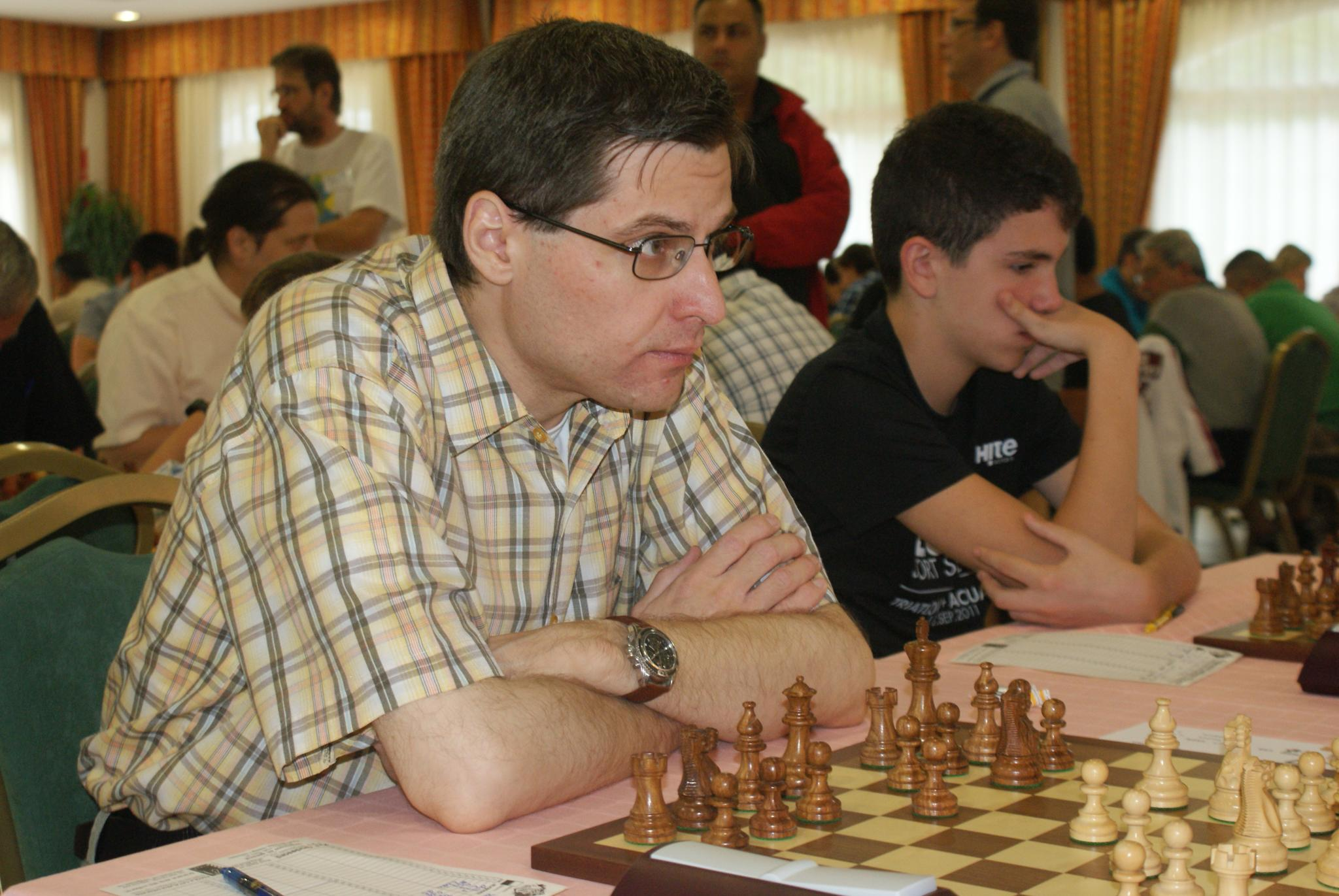
- Zoler at the 2012 Andorra Open

Personal information
- Native name: דן זולר
- Born: January 10, 1974 (age 52)

Chess career
- Country: Israel
- Title: Grandmaster (2011)
- FIDE rating: 2487 (July 2026)
- Peak rating: 2558 (August 2012)

Dan Zoler (Hebrew: דן זולר; born January 10, 1974) is an Israeli chess Grandmaster (2011) and a medical doctor. His highest rating was 2558 (August 2012) when he ranked 12th in Israel.

He won the 1990 U20 Israeli championship.

In 1992 in Duisburg he achieved a bronze medal at the junior U18 world championship.

In July 2010 Zoler won clear first place at the International Open in Andorra with 7.5/9.

In July 2012 he won clear first place at the 32nd International Open at Benasque in Spain scoring 9/10.
