= Yaacov Bleiman =

Lithuanian-Israeli chess player (1947–2004)

Personal information
- Native name: יעקב בליימן
- Born: September 8, 1947 Vilnius, Lithuania
- Died: June 15, 2004 (aged 56) Haifa, Israel

Chess career
- Country: Israel
- Title: International Master
- FIDE rating: 2405 (October 2001)
- Peak rating: 2521 (December 1979)
- Peak ranking: No. 131

Yaacov (Yacov) Bleiman (Hebrew: יעקב בליימן; September 8, 1947, Vilnius – June, 2004) was a Lithuanian–Israeli chess master.

Bleiman spent a decade designing a smart bomb that was procured by the Israeli Air Force for its F-16 fighter jets in 2003.

== Chess ==
In 1965, Bleiman played in World Junior Championship in Barcelona (Bojan Kurajica won). In 1971, he tied for 7-8th in Netanya (Lubomir Kavalek and Bruno Parma won). In 1976, he tied for 3-4th in Netanya (Avraham Kaldor and Itchak Radashkovich won).

He played for Israel in three Chess Olympiads.

- In 1970, at second reserve board in 19th Olympiad in Siegen (+4 –0 =5);
- In 1974, at first reserve board in 21st Olympiad in Nice (+6 –1 =8);
- In 1978, at fourth board in 23rd Olympiad in Buenos Aires (+3 –1 =3).

He also represented Israel in the 7th European Team Chess Championship at Skara 1980.

Bleiman was awarded the International Master (IM) title in 1971.
