= Menachem Oren =

Polish-born Israeli chess player and mathematician

- מנחם אורן
- Born: Mieczysław Chwojnik; 1903; Ruzhany, Russian Empire
- Died: December 1962 (aged 58–59); Tel Aviv, Israel
- Citizenship: Poland; Israel
- Occupation: chess player

Menachem Oren (born Mieczysław Chwojnik; Hebrew: מנחם אורן; 1903 – December 1962) was a Polish-born Israeli chess player and mathematician.

Chwojnik was the strongest Cracovian chess player in 1920s, a thrice winner of the Kraków championship (1919, 1925, 1926). He won the Nowy Dziennik tournament in Kraków in 1926.

He played in two Polish championships. In 1926, he tied for 8-9th places in Warsaw (first Polish championship). The event was won by Dawid Przepiórka. In 1927, he tied for 5-7th in Łódź. The event was won by Akiba Rubinstein. In 1928, he represented Poland on fourth board at the 2nd Chess Olympiad in The Hague (+4 –3 =4), and won the team bronze medal.

He left Kraków for Rivne, Volhynia (then Poland), in the 1930s. He won in the Rivne City championship in 1938. During World War II, he lived in the Soviet Union. After the war, he returned to Poland in 1945/46, and settled in Lower Silesia.

In 1949, Chwojnik emigrated, via Czechoslovakia and Austria, to Israel, where he had changed name to Menachem Oren. In 1951, he won the Israeli championship and the Tel Aviv City championship. In 1952, he won again the Tel Aviv City championship.

He played thrice for Israel in Chess Olympiads: on board two (+6 –4 =3) at Helsinki 1952, board three(+7 –2 =3) at Amsterdam 1954, and board four (+2 –2 =4) at Moscow 1956.
