= Shimon Kagan =

Israeli chess player (1942–2024)

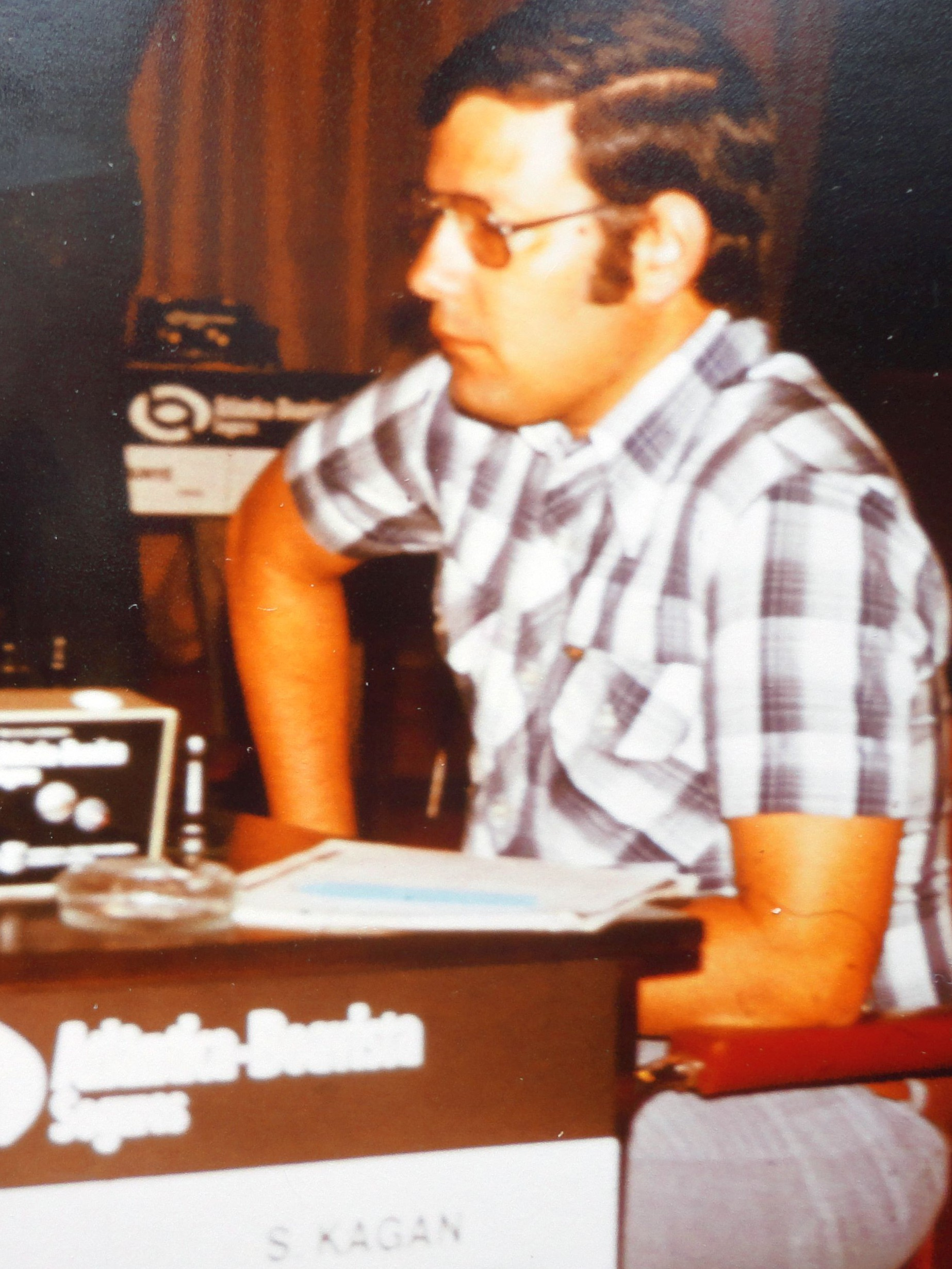
- Kagan in 1979

Personal information
- Native name: שמעון כגן
- Born: 6 April 1942 Tel Aviv, Mandatory Palestine
- Died: 6 October 2024 (aged 82)

Chess career
- Country: Israel
- Title: International Master (1969)
- Peak rating: 2465 (January 1978)

Shimon Kagan (Hebrew: שמעון כגן; 6 April 1942 – 6 October 2024) was an Israeli chess master. He was born in Tel Aviv on 6 April 1942, and died on 6 October 2024, at the age of 82.

== Career ==
Kagan was Israeli Champion in 1967 and 1969. He tied for 4-5th at Netanya 1968 (Bobby Fischer won), tied for 9-10th at Netanya 1969 (Samuel Reshevsky won), took 9th at Netanya 1971 (Lubomir Kavalek and Bruno Parma won).

Kagan played for Israel in nine Chess Olympiads.

- In 1966, at fourth board in 17th Chess Olympiad in Havana (+4 –6 =1);
- In 1968, at fourth board in 18th Chess Olympiad in Lugano (+9 –1 =3);
- In 1970, at first board in 19th Chess Olympiad in Siegen (+10 –3 =3);
- In 1972, at first board in 20th Chess Olympiad in Skopje (+5 –7 =5);
- In 1974, at fourth board in 21st Chess Olympiad in Nice (+11 –1 =4);
- In 1976, at first reserve board in 22nd Chess Olympiad in Haifa (+5 –2 =2);
- In 1978, at third board in 23rd Chess Olympiad in Buenos Aires (+3 –4 =2);
- In 1980, at first reserve board in 24th Chess Olympiad in La Valletta (+3 –3 =0);
- In 1982, at second reserve board in 25th Chess Olympiad in Lucerne (+2 –1 =4).

He won two individual medals; gold at Lugano 1968, and bronze at Nice 1974.

Kagan was awarded the International Master (IM) title in 1969.
