= Ljuba Kristol =

Israeli chess player (born 1944)

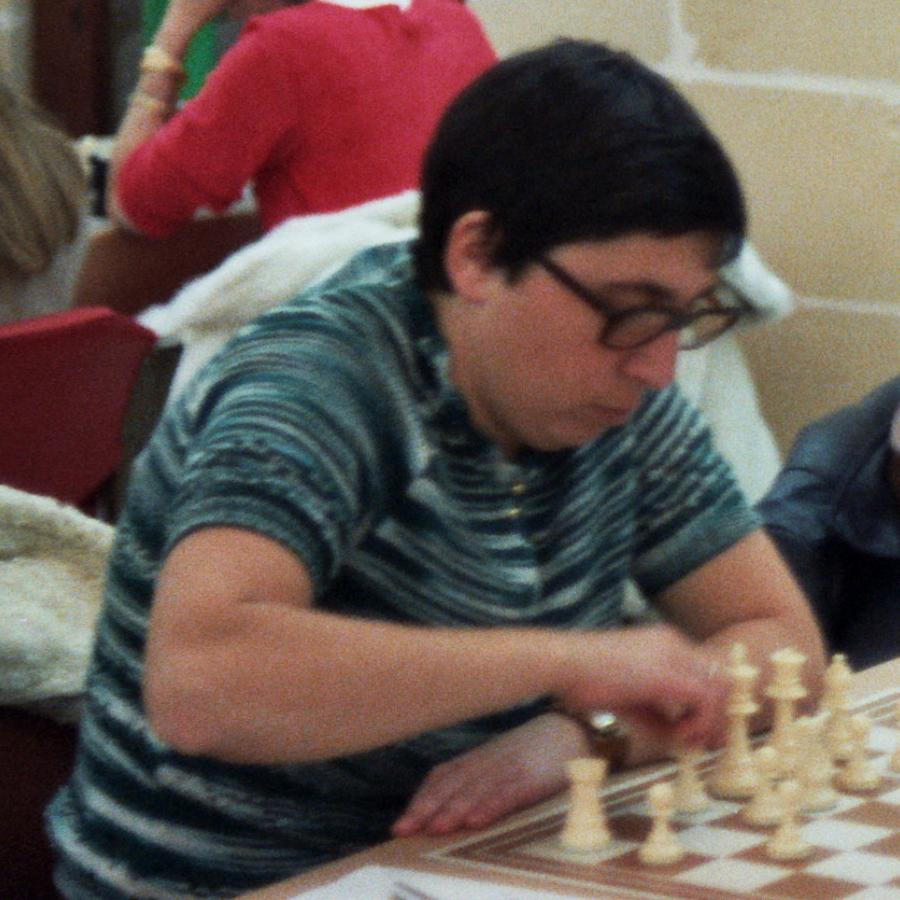
- Kristol at Chess Olympiad, Malta, 1980

Personal information
- Native name: לובה קריסטול
- Born: Ljuba Danielovna Kristol; May 26, 1944 (age 82) Leningrad, Russia

Chess career
- Country: Israel
- Title: ICCF Lady Grandmaster (1990); FIDE Woman International Master
- ICCF World Champion: 1978–1984 (women); 1993–1998 (women)
- FIDE rating: 2233 (October 2000)
- Peak rating: 2250 (January 1987)
- ICCF rating: 2338 (October 2008)
- ICCF peak rating: 2488 (October 2001)

Ljuba Danielovna Kristol (Hebrew: לובה דניאלובנה קריסטול; Russian: Любовь Даниэловна Кристол; born May 26, 1944, in Leningrad) is a Russian-born Israeli chess player who holds the ICCF title of Lady Grandmaster (LGM) and the FIDE title of Woman International Master (WIM).

She is best known for winning the ICCF Women's World Championship in correspondence chess on two occasions: between 1978 and 1984, and between 1993 and 1998.

She grew up in Leningrad (now St. Petersburg), and since 1976 has lived in Israel. Kristol is the four-time OTB women's chess champion of Israel.

She took part in four Chess Olympiads as a member of the Israeli team. In the Olympiad in 1976 (which took place in Haifa), Kristol won the gold medal with the Israeli team.

In 1989 Kristol participated in a zonal tournament in Haifa, and shared 1st–2nd place.

== Tournaments ==
Major tournaments that Kristol participated in

Start date	Name of tournament	Site	Board in a group tournament	Place in a personal tournament	Number of games	Category	Result needed for a GM norm	Actual result
1 May 1997	Champion of champions of Israel		-	1	10	-	-	8
16 October 2003	Semi final of WC number 27		-	6	12	7	9.5	6
16 October 2004	VI European final		12	-	13	5	-	5
20 December 2004	NPSF 60 Years GM Jubilee Tournament		-	5	14	11	9	7.5
10 July 2005	Preliminary of the 17th Olympiad		5	-	10	4	-	4
15 April 2006	60 Years Anniversary BdF		-	-	16	-	-	4.5 not ended

Preceded by Lora Jakovleva	Ladies World Correspondence Chess Champion; 1978–1984	Succeeded by Liudmila Belavenets
Preceded by Liudmila Belavenets	Ladies World Correspondence Chess Champion; 1993–1998	Succeeded by Alessandra Riegler
