= Lev Psakhis =

Israeli chess grandmaster (born 1958)

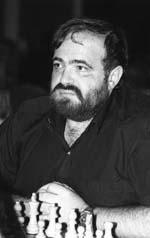

Personal information
- Native name: לב פסחיס
- Born: Lev Borisovich Psakhis; 29 November 1958 (age 67) Kalinin, Russian SFSR, Soviet Union

Chess career
- Country: Israel (after 1990); Soviet Union (before 1990)
- Title: Grandmaster (1982)
- FIDE rating: 2438 (November 2026)
- Peak rating: 2625 (January 1995)
- Peak ranking: No. 7 (July 1982)

Lev Borisovich Psakhis (Hebrew: לב בוריסוביץ' פסחיס; Russian: Лев Борисович Псахис; born 29 November 1958) is an Israeli chess grandmaster, trainer and author. He is also a two-time former champion of the Soviet Union.

== Biography ==
He gained the International Master and International Grandmaster titles in 1980 and 1982 respectively, either side of two momentous Soviet Championship victories in 1980 (Vilnius—shared with Alexander Beliavsky) and 1981 (Frunze—shared with Garry Kasparov, whom he defeated in round 2).

In international tournaments, he has had many fine results, including outright or shared first place at Nałęczów 1980, Sarajevo 1981, Cienfuegos 1983, Troon 1984, Sverdlovsk 1984, Szirak 1986, Sarajevo 1986, Sevastopol 1986, Lugano Open 1988, Tel Aviv 1990 (and again in 1999), London MSO 1999, and Andorra 2002. There were creditable second-place finishes at Tallinn 1983, Sochi 1985, Trnava 1988, Calcutta 1988, Erevan 1988, and Herzliya 1998.

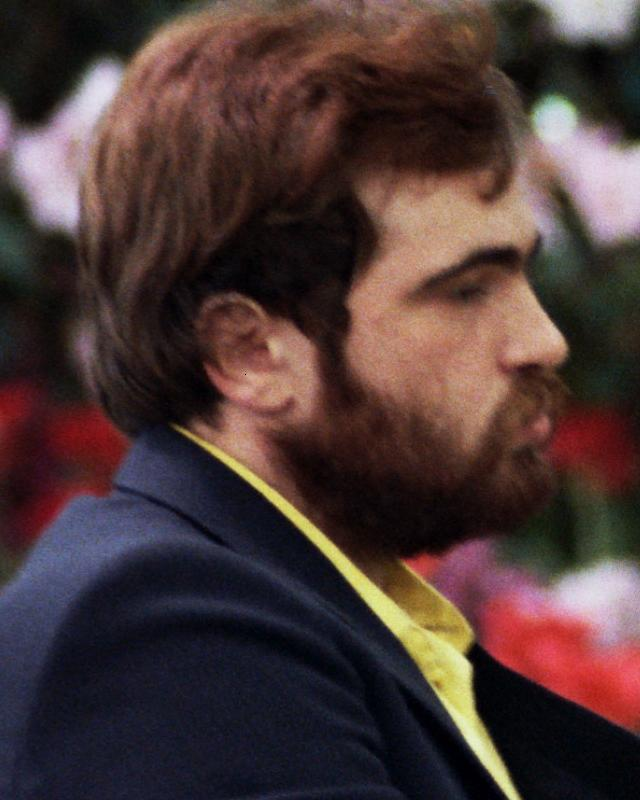
Psakhis at Dortmund 1982

In the World Championship cycle, he was a runner-up at the Erevan Zonal of 1982 and qualified for the Interzonal at Las Palmas later the same year. Posting only a modest score however, he failed to progress to the Candidates stage of the competition.

He was champion of Israel in 1997 and shared the title in 1999. He has also represented his adopted country at the Chess Olympiad seven times between 1990 and 2002. At the European Team Chess Championship, he was first a member of the Soviet team at Plovdiv in 1983, when he won individual and team gold medals. Representing Israel thereafter, he took the board 4 individual gold medal at Batumi in 1999.

Over the years, he has assisted in many training programs, dating back to the late 1980s when he worked with Kasparov and Artur Yusupov. He played a training match with Kasparov in 1990 and lost 1–5. Other students and famous chess players whom he has seconded include Susan Polgar, Judit Polgár, Daniel Naroditsky, and Emil Sutovsky. In 2011, Psakhis underwent liver transplant. He managed to recover successfully and return to the chess scene.

== Playing style ==
He was in his youth a player of sharp and vivid, complex positions, but nowadays prefers to play in a positional sense. Consequently, he has developed an affinity with the French Defence and is a noted expert on it, beginning with writing The Complete French (and The Complete Benoni) for B.T. Batsford in the early nineties. His latest Batsford effort is a four-volume treatise on the French in 2003/4, titled Vol.1 French Defence: 3. Nd2 (Tarrasch), Vol.2 French Defence: Advance and Anti-French Variations, Vol.3 French Defence: 3. Nc3 Bb4 (Winawer) and Vol.4 French Defence: Steinitz, Classical and Other Variations.

== See also ==
- List of Jewish chess players

== Bibliography ==
- Cafferty, Bernard and Mark Taimanov (1998). The Soviet Championships. Cadogan Chess. ISBN 1-85744-201-6.
- Felice, Gino Di (7 October 2014). Chess Results, 1978-1980: A Comprehensive Record with 855 Tournament Crosstables and 90 Match Scores, with Sources. McFarland. ISBN 978-0-7864-9656-3.
- Felice, Gino Di (3 August 2022a). Chess Results, 1981-1985: A Comprehensive Record with 1,508 Tournament Crosstables and 205 Match Scores, with Sources. McFarland. ISBN 978-1-4766-4159-1.
- Felice, Gino Di (11 October 2022b). Chess Results, 1986-1988: A Comprehensive Record with 843 Tournament Crosstables and 130 Match Scores, with Sources. McFarland. ISBN 978-1-4766-8404-8.
- Hooper, David and Whyld, Kenneth (1984). The Oxford Companion to Chess. Oxford University. ISBN 0-19-217540-8.
- Olimpbase – Olympiads and other Team event information
