= Ilya Smirin =

Israeli chess grandmaster (born 1968)

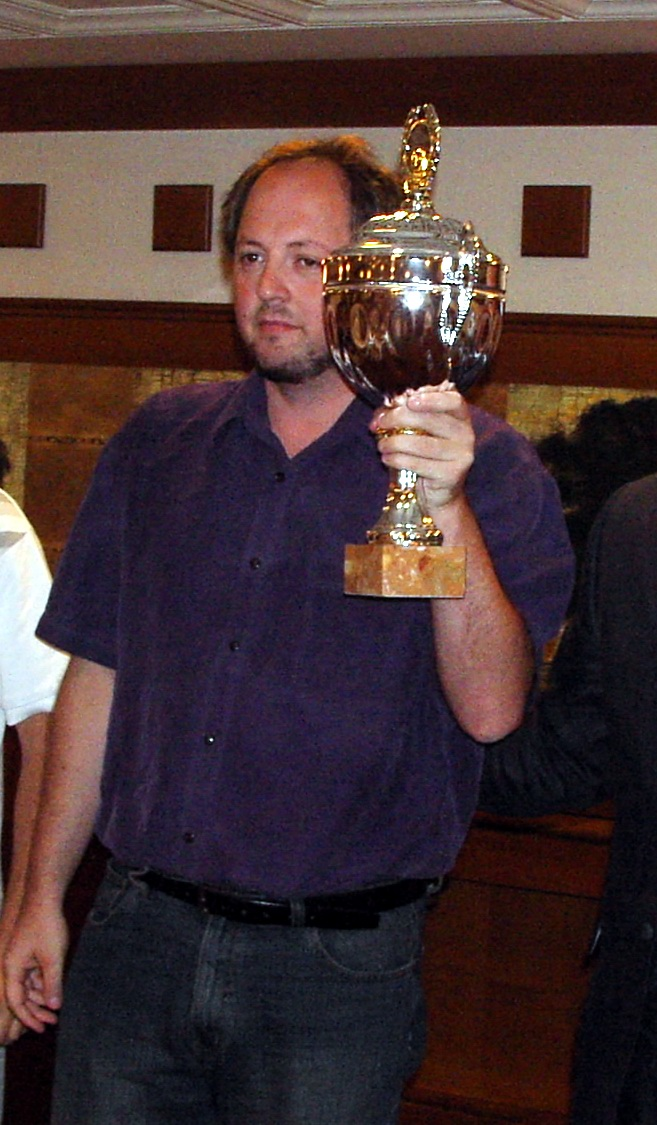
- Smirin winning at Athens 2007

Personal information
- Native name: איליה סמירין
- Born: January 12, 1968 (age 58) Vitebsk, Byelorussian SSR, USSR

Chess career
- Country: Soviet Union (until 1991); Israel (since 1991)
- Title: Grandmaster (1990)
- FIDE rating: 2578 (September 2026)
- Peak rating: 2702 (July 2001)
- Peak ranking: No. 13 (July 2001)

Ilya (or Ilia) Smirin (Hebrew: איליה יוליביץ' סמירין; Belarusian: Ілля Юльевіч Смірын, romanized: Illa Juljevič Smiryn; Russian: Илья Юльевич Смирин, romanized: Ilya Yulievich Smirin; born January 21, 1968) is a Belarusian-Israeli chess player. He was awarded the title of Grandmaster by FIDE in 1990. Champion of Israel in 1992, 2002 and 2023.

== Chess career ==
Born in Vitebsk, Smirin's chess career began in the Soviet Union. He was certified as a chess teacher by the Belorussian State Institute of Physical Culture in Minsk. In 1987, Smirin won the championship of the Byelorussian SSR. In 1992, he immigrated to Israel and has since been one of the leading Israeli players. Smirin competed in four FIDE World Championships (1999, 2000, 2002, and 2004) and in three FIDE World Cups (2005, 2009, and 2015).

Smirin's tournament successes include equal first places at Sverdlovsk 1987, New York 1994, and the 2002 Israeli Championship. He has also won the first league of the USSR Championship (1987, 1989), the Israel Championship (1992, 1994, 1999), and the qualifying tournaments for the 1994 and 1995 PCA World Grand Prix.

In 2000, he won the New York Open in its last edition. In 2001, he took the closed tournament at Dos Hermanas (together with Alexei Dreev). Smirin won the traditional Grandmaster Tournament of the Biel Chess Festival in 2002 as clear first. He won a silver medal at the 2005 Maccabiah Games in Israel. In 2007, he won the Acropolis International at Athens, scoring 7/9 points to take first by half a point. In 2008, he tied for first with Evgeny Postny in Maalot-Tarshiha. Smirin won the World Open on tiebreak in 2014, after shared first places in 2001, 2002, and 2003. In 2015, he tied for first again.

In 2019, he tied first place in the 3rd Shlomo Tiran Memorial with Gabriel Flom.

In 2019, he won the Eliahu Levant Memorial with a score of 5/6.

In 2016, he published the critically acclaimed book, King's Indian Warfare.

=== Team competitions ===
He is a member of the Ashdod chess club, with which he won two individual bronze medals in the European Club Cup.

Playing on the Israeli national team, he won the team bronze medal in the 2010 Chess Olympiad, two team silver in the European Team Chess Championship (in 2003 and 2005), and two individual medals in the World Team Chess Championship (gold on board two in 2005 and bronze on board three in 2015).

In total, he played at the Chess Olympiads of 1992, 1994, 1996, 1998, 2000, 2002, 2004, 2006, 2010 and 2014. He played at the European Team Chess Championship in 1992, 1997, 1999, 2001, 2003, 2005, 2007, 2011, and 2017. He played at the World Team Chess Championship in 2005, 2010, 2011, and 2015.

== Notable games ==
Kramnik vs. Smirin, Moscow 2002

Position: g1 white king, e1 white rook, d1 white queen, c1 white bishop, a1 white rook, h2 white pawn, g2 white pawn, f2 white pawn, e2 white bishop, d2 white knight, c3 white knight, e4 white pawn, a4 white pawn, f5 black pawn, e5 black pawn, d5 white pawn, a5 black rook, g6 black pawn, f6 black knight, d6 black pawn, h7 black pawn, g7 black bishop, e7 black knight, b7 black pawn, g8 black king, f8 black rook, d8 black queen, c8 black bishop

position after 15.a4

Here Smirin, as Black, outplays the World Champion at the time:

Kramnik–Smirin, Russia (USSR) vs Rest of the World, Moscow 2002
1.d4 Nf6 2.c4 g6 3.Nc3 Bg7 4.e4 d6 5.Nf3 0-0 6.Be2 e5 7.0-0 Nc6 8.d5 Ne7 9.b4 Nh5 10.Re1 a5 11.bxa5 f5 12.Nd2 Nf6 13.c5 Rxa5 14.cxd6 cxd6 15.a4 (diagram) Bh6 16.Ba3 Bxd2 17.Qxd2 fxe4 18.Bb5 Bf5 19.h3 Ra8 20.g4 Bc8 21.Nxe4 Nxe4 22.Rxe4 Bd7 23.Bf1 Bxa4 24.Bb4 b5 25.Ra3 Rc8 26.Rc3 Qb6 27.Bg2 Rxc3 28.Bxc3 Bb3 29.Re1 Bc4 30.Ba5 Qb7 31.Rd1 Rf4 32.Bc3 Bb3 33.Bxe5 dxe5 34.d6 Qd7 35.Rc1 Bc4 36.Qb4 Nc8 37.Qc5 Nxd6 38.Qxe5 Rf8 39.Rd1 Nf7 0–1

== Controversies ==
On 27 September 2022, Smirin, while broadcasting live during the ninth round of the FIDE Women's Grand Prix 2022–23, admitted that he had privately asserted that chess was "maybe not for women", and also praised Grandmaster Aleksandra Goryachkina for playing like a man. FIDE apologized through Twitter and called Smirin's comments embarrassing and offensive. The same day, FIDE fired Smirin for making "offensive remarks".
