= Victor Mikhalevski =

Israeli chess grandmaster (born 1972)

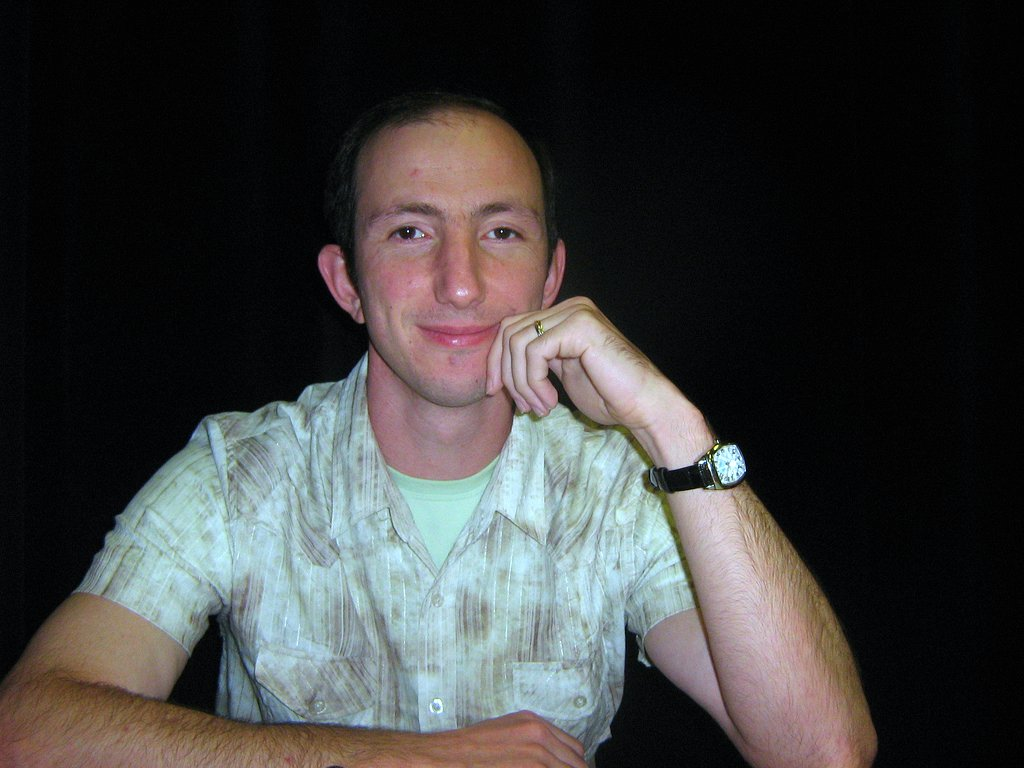
- Mikhalevski in 2008

Personal information
- Native name: ויקטור מיכלבסקי
- Born: 8 July 1972 (age 54) Gomel, Byelorussian SSR, Soviet Union

Chess career
- Country: Soviet Union (until 1991); Israel (since 1991)
- Title: Grandmaster (1996)
- FIDE rating: 2466 (November 2026)
- Peak rating: 2632 (January 2008)
- Peak ranking: No. 92 (January 2008)

Victor Mikhalevski (Hebrew: ויקטור מיכלבסקי; born 8 July 1972) is an Israeli chess grandmaster who lives in Beersheba.

== Career ==
Mikhalevski was born in Gomel, Byelorussian SSR, Soviet Union (now Belarus). He played for Israel as second reserve (+4 –1 =2) in the 37th Chess Olympiad in Turin 2006 and at third board (+1 -1 =4) in the 17th European Team Championship at Novi Sad 2009.

He won the Calvià Open in Mallorca, Spain in October 2007, winning in each of the first seven rounds to finish with a score of 8/9 for a performance of 2876. Kevin Spraggett was second at 7/9. He also won a category 12 invitational tournament at Montreal in 2005 with 8/11 (+5 -0 =6) and tied for first at the 2008 Canadian Open Chess Championship in Montreal, with 6/9. He also was Israeli Vice-Champion in 1998 and tied for first in 1996 in Jerusalem and in 2008 in Haifa.

Amongst the other major tournaments, he won Israeli U-20 championship in 1991 and 1992 and tied for 2nd to 3rd in the Israeli Open Chess Championship in 1993. He also won the 1993 First Saturday tournament in Budapest with 10 out of 13, the 1994 International Festival in Tel Aviv, the 1995 Open tournament in Paris and the Tel Aviv Open, the 1997 International Festival in Rishon-Lezion, Israel, 2nd VAM Open in Hoogeveen, Netherlands in 1998, the 1998 14th International Festival in Tel Aviv, 2000 Open Championship of Rishon Lezion, Israel, the 2002 International Festival in Biel/Bienne, Switzerland(rapid), 6th Itau Cup in São Paulo, Brazil, 1st and 2nd International tournaments in San Salvador, El Salvador in 2002 and 2003, 2003 Quebec Open in Montreal, Canada in all 3 sections (classical, rapid, blitz), 2005 Lake George Open, New York, United States, 2006 category 10 Spring Invitational in Schaumburg, Illinois, United States, with 7.5 out of 9, 2006 GM Slugfest in Bellevue, Washington, United States, 2007 Curaçao Chess festival, Netherlands Antilles, 7.5 out of 9.

He tied for first in the 1999 Lost Boys tournament in Antwerpen, Belgium, 2003 First International Festival in Ashdod, Israel, 2004 International festival in Drammen, Norway, with 8 out of 9, 2006 International Festival in Ashdod, Israel, 2006 International tournament in Coamo, Puerto Rico, 2007 World Open in Philadelphia, United States, 2007 Miami Open, Florida, United States, 2009 4th Edmonton International, Canada and 2009 North American Open in Las Vegas, Nevada, United States. In 2010, he tied for 2nd–5th with Michael Adams, Evgeniy Najer and Jiří Štoček the 14th Chicago Open, and later in the same year he was a member of the bronze medal-winning Israel team for the 39th Chess Olympiad.

Mikhalevski was awarded the IM title in 1993 and the GM title in 1996.

In 2014 he won the Israeli championship.

He competed at the 2017 Maccabiah Games.

In 2019, he won 2nd- 4th place in the Israeli Open Championships along with Gad Rechlis and Michal Lahav with 7/9 points.

In 2025, Mikhalevski won the 50+ section of the World Senior Chess Championship.

== Life and family ==
Victor's brother is Alexander Mikhalevski, an international master in chess.
