= 21st Chess Olympiad =

1974 chess tournament in Nice, France

Official logo of the Olympiad.

The 21st Chess Olympiad (French: La 21^{e} Olympiade d'échecs), organized by FIDE and comprising an open team tournament, as well as several other events designed to promote the game of chess, took place between June 6 and June 30, 1974, in Nice, France.

Bobby Fischer was still the reigning World Champion, but had not played a single game of tournament chess since he won the title in 1972 and was not present in Nice either. However, the American team still managed to secure third place in his absence.

For the same reason, for the second time in a row, the Soviet team was not led by the current world champion. It did, however, feature three previous (Tal, Petrosian, and Spassky) as well as one future champion (Karpov). The team won by 8½ points, the biggest victory margin yet, and took home their twelfth consecutive gold medals, with Yugoslavia and the United States taking the silver and bronze, respectively.

With a complete lack of tension in the championship race, the tournament had more than its share of political tension. In Final B, the Tunisian team refused to play Israel, so the score was computed according to Elo ratings, and awarded as a 3–1 win for the Israeli team.

Due to their apartheid policies, both South Africa and Rhodesia were expelled from FIDE with three rounds to go. The South African team withdrew from the tournament, and their Final C results were deleted from the overall standings. After FIDE president Max Euwe failed to have Rhodesia ejected from the Olympiad, they were allowed to finish the tournament and won Final E, with help from default victories against Iraq and Algeria who refused to play them in protest.

== Results ==
=== Preliminaries ===
A total of 74 teams were divided into eight preliminary groups of nine or ten teams each, from which the top two advanced to Final A, no. 3-4 to Final B, etc. Preliminary head-to-head results were carried over to the finals, so no team met any other team more than once. All preliminary groups and finals were played as round-robin tournaments.

The results were as follows:

- Group 1:

№	Country	1	2	3	4	5	6	7	8	9	+	−	=	Points
«A»	Soviet Union	-	4	3½	3	3	3½	4	4	4	8	0	0	29
«A»	Wales	0	-	2½	2½	1½	3	4	3½	4	6	2	0	21
«B»	Scotland	½	1½	-	2	2½	3	3½	4	4	5	2	1	21
«B»	Poland	1	1½	2	-	2½	2½	2½	4	4	5	2	1	20
«C»	Brazil	1	2½	1½	1½	-	2½	2½	3½	4	5	3	0	19
«C»	Mongolia	½	1	1	1½	1½	-	3	3	3½	3	5	0	15
«D»	Puerto Rico	0	0	½	1½	1½	1	-	3	3½	2	6	0	11
«D»	Jordan	0	½	0	0	½	1	1	-	2	0	7	1	5
«E»	Netherlands Antilles	0	0	0	0	0	½	½	2	-	0	7	1	3

- Group 2:

№	Country	1	2	3	4	5	6	7	8	9	+	−	=	Points
«A»	United States	-	3	4	2	2	3½	4	4	4	6	0	2	26½
«A»	England	1	-	2½	3	3	4	3½	4	3½	7	1	0	24½
«B»	Denmark	0	1½	-	3½	3	3½	3	2½	3½	6	2	0	20½
«B»	Canada	2	1	½	-	1½	2½	4	4	4	4	3	1	20½
«C»	Australia	2	1	1	2½	-	2½	4	3½	3	5	2	1	19½
«C»	Ecuador	½	0	½	½	1½	-	2	3	3	2	5	1	11
«D»	Luxembourg	0	½	1	0	0	2	-	1½	3	1	6	1	8
«D»	Panama	0	0	1½	0	½	1	2½	-	2	1	6	1	7½
«E»	Rhodesia	0	½	½	0	1	1	1	2	-	0	7	1	6

- Group 3:

№	Country	1	2	3	4	5	6	7	8	9	+	−	=	Points
«A»	Yugoslavia	-	2	2½	3	3½	2½	4	4	4	7	0	1	25½
«A»	Finland	2	-	1½	2	4	4	2½	4	3	5	1	2	23
«B»	Cuba	1½	2½	-	1	2	4	3½	4	4	5	2	1	22½
«B»	Italy	1	2	3	-	1	3	2½	3½	3	5	2	1	19
«C»	Iran	½	0	2	3	-	2½	2	3	3	4	2	2	16
«C»	Venezuela	1½	0	0	1	1½	-	2½	2	4	2	5	1	12½
«D»	Pakistan	0	1½	½	1½	2	1½	-	3	2	1	5	2	12
«D»	Uruguay	0	0	0	½	1	2	1	-	3	1	6	1	7½
«E»	Iraq	0	1	0	1	1	0	2	1	-	0	7	1	6

- Group 4:

№	Country	1	2	3	4	5	6	7	8	9	10	+	−	=	Points
«A»	Hungary	-	2½	3	3½	4	4	3½	4	4		8	0	0	28½
«A»	Spain	1½	-	2	2	3	3	3½	3½	4		5	1	2	22½
«B»	Belgium	1	2	-	2½	2½	2½	3½	2½	2½		6	1	1	19
«B»	Tunisia	½	2	1½	-	2	2½	3	3½	2½		4	2	2	17½
«C»	Chile	0	1	1½	2	-	2	4	3	3½	4	3	3	2	17
«C»	Syria	0	1	1½	1½	2	-	1	3½	3		2	5	1	13½
«D»	Malta	½	½	½	1	0	3	-	2½	3		3	5	0	11
«D»	Malaysia	0	½	1½	½	1	½	1½	-	2½		1	7	0	8
«E»	Japan	0	0	1½	1½	½	1	1	1½	-		0	8	0	7
	Nicaragua					0					-				

- Only two players from the Nicaraguan team arrived in Nice, and after the team were forced to forfeit their first match against Chile, Nicaragua withdrew from the tournament. The forfeit was deleted from the Group 4 standings.
- Group 5:

№	Country	1	2	3	4	5	6	7	8	9	+	−	=	Points
«A»	West Germany	-	2	3	4	3	3	4	4	4	7	0	1	27
«A»	Sweden	2	-	1½	3	2	3½	4	4	3	5	1	2	24
«B»	Iceland	1	2½	-	3	1½	3	3½	4	2½	6	2	0	21
«B»	Portugal	0	1	1	-	3½	2½	4	4	4	5	3	0	20
«C»	South Africa	1	2	2½	½	-	2	3	4	4	4	2	2	19
«C»	Ireland	1	½	1	1½	2	-	3	3	3	3	4	1	15
«D»	Hong Kong	0	0	½	0	1	1	-	3	3	2	6	0	8½
«D»	Guernsey	0	0	0	0	0	1	1	-	3	1	7	0	5
«E»	Trinidad and Tobago	0	0	1½	0	0	1	1	1	-	0	8	0	4½

- Group 6:

№	Country	1	2	3	4	5	6	7	8	9	+	−	=	Points
«A»	Czechoslovakia	-	2	3½	3	4	4	4	4	4	7	0	1	28½
«A»	Romania	2	-	2½	3	3	3	4	3½	4	7	0	1	25
«B»	Norway	½	1½	-	2½	3½	4	3	3½	4	6	2	0	22½
«B»	Colombia	1	1	1½	-	2	2½	3½	4	4	4	3	1	19½
«C»	New Zealand	0	1	½	2	-	1	2	3	4	2	4	2	13½
«C»	Singapore	0	1	0	1½	3	-	1½	1	3½	2	6	0	11½
«D»	Lebanon	0	0	1	½	2	2½	-	2	3	2	4	2	11
«D»	Monaco	0	½	½	0	1	3	2	-	2	1	5	2	9
«E»	Andorra	0	0	0	0	0	½	1	2	-	0	7	1	3½

- Group 7:

№	Country	1	2	3	4	5	6	7	8	9	10	+	−	=	Points
«A»	Bulgaria	-	3	2	1½	2	3	3½	4	4	4	6	1	2	27
«A»	Philippines	1	-	2	2½	2½	3½	3½	3½	4	4	7	1	1	26½
«B»	Israel	2	2	-	3	2½	2½	2	3½	4	3	6	0	3	24½
«B»	France	2½	1½	1	-	2½	3½	3½	3	3	3½	7	2	0	24
«C»	Indonesia	2	1½	1½	1½	-	3	3	2½	3½	4	5	3	1	22½
«C»	Turkey	1	½	1½	½	1	-	1½	4	4	3	3	6	0	17
«D»	Dominican Republic	½	½	2	½	1	2½	-	3	2	4	3	4	2	16
«D»	Faroe Islands	0	½	½	1	1½	0	1	-	2½	2½	2	7	0	9½
«E»	Cyprus	0	0	0	1	½	0	2	1½	-	3½	1	7	1	8½
«E»	British Virgin Islands	0	0	1	½	0	1	0	1½	½	-	0	9	0	4½

- Group 8:

№	Country	1	2	3	4	5	6	7	8	9	+	−	=	Points
«A»	Netherlands	-	3	1	3	4	3	4	4	4	7	1	0	26
«A»	Argentina	1	-	3	3	3½	3½	4	4	4	7	1	0	26
«B»	Austria	3	1	-	2	3	3½	3	4	4	6	1	1	23½
«B»	Switzerland	1	1	2	-	2½	3	3½	3	4	5	2	1	20
«C»	Greece	0	½	1	1½	-	2½	4	4	3	4	4	0	16½
«C»	Mexico	1	½	½	1	1½	-	3	4	4	3	5	0	15½
«D»	Morocco	0	0	1	½	0	1	-	4	4	2	6	0	10½
«D»	United States Virgin Islands	0	0	0	1	0	0	0	-	2	0	7	1	3
«E»	Bahamas	0	0	0	0	1	0	0	2	-	0	7	1	3

=== Finals ===
Final A
#	Country	Players	Average rating	Points	MP
1	Soviet Union	Karpov, Korchnoi, Spassky, Petrosian, Tal, Kuzmin	2665	46	
2	Yugoslavia	Gligorić, Ljubojević, Ivkov, Planinc, Velimirović, Parma	2566	37½	
3	United States	Kavalek, Byrne, Browne, Reshevsky, Lombardy, Tarjan	2586	36½	22
4	Bulgaria	Radulov, Padevsky, Tringov, Popov, Spasov, Kirov	2475	36½	21
5	Netherlands	Timman, Donner, Sosonko, Ree, Enklaar, Kuijpers	2478	35½	
6	Hungary	Portisch, Bilek, Csom, Ribli, Forintos, Sax	2554	35	
7	West Germany	Schmid, Unzicker, Pfleger, Hecht, Dueball, Kestler	2534	32	
8	Romania	Gheorghiu, Ciocâltea, Ghițescu, Ghizdavu, Partoș, Pavlov	2468	29½	16
9	Czechoslovakia	Hort, Jansa, Filip, Přibyl, Plachetka, Lechtýnský	2521	29½	14
10	England	Hartston, Keene, Penrose, Whiteley, Stean, Markland	2456	26	
11	Philippines	Torre, Cardoso, Naranja, Balinas, Lontoc, Bordonada	2358	25½	12
12	Spain	Pomar, Torán, Calvo, Bellón López, Visier Segovia, Sanz	2428	25½	11
13	Sweden	Andersson, Ornstein, Jansson, Liljedahl, Uddenfeldt, Kinnmark	2448	25	
14	Argentina	Quinteros, Sanguineti, Najdorf, Rubinetti, Szmetan, Debarnot	2491	23½	
15	Finland	Westerinen, Poutiainen, Rantanen, Hurme, Venäläinen, Raaste	2319	22	
16	Wales	Williams, Hutchings, Jones, Cooper, Sully, Trevelyan	2285	14½	

Final B
#	Country	Players	Average rating	Points	MP
17	Israel	Liberzon, Kraidman, Czerniak, Kagan, Bleiman, Radashkovich	2465	40½	
18	Austria	Robatsch, Dückstein, Prameshuber, Janetschek, Röhrl, Stoppel	2388	38½	
19	Italy	Mariotti, Tatai, Tóth, Cosulich, Zichichi, Cappello	2428	38	
20	Colombia	Castro, Cuartas, Alzate, García, de Greiff, Silva	2354	32½	
21	Norway	Øgaard, Johannessen, Zwaig, Hoen, Ulrichsen, Moen	2410	32	19
22	Iceland	Ólafsson, Sigurjónsson, Jóhannsson, Kristinsson, Ásmundsson, Víglundsson	2456	32	18
23	Poland	Schmidt, Doda, Pytel, Kostro, Adamski, Pokojowczyk	2430	32	17
24	Canada	Suttles, Biyiasas, Yanofsky, Kuprejanov, Day, Piasetski	2419	31	18
25	Cuba	García González, García Martínez, Rodríguez Cordoba, Jiménez, Estévez Morales, Rodríguez Céspedes	2423	31	15
26	Denmark	Andersen, Rath, Moe, Iskov, Kølbæk, Jacobsen	2405	31	14
27	Switzerland	Hug, Lombard, Schaufelberger, Wirthensohn, Gereben, Ott	2380	29	
28	France	Maclès, Todorcevic, Seret, Puhm, Bessenay, Benoit	2381	27½	
29	Scotland	Pritchett, McKay, Levy, Jamieson, Bonner, Young	2319	25½	
30	Belgium	Boey, Van Seters, Beyen, Bonne, De Bruycker, Wostyn	2323	23½	
31	Portugal	Durão, Silva, Cordovil, Ribeiro, Santos L., Santos J. P.	2306	19½	
32	Tunisia	Bouaziz, Belkadi, Tabbane, Teboudi K., Najar C., Graa	2200	17½	

Final C
#	Country	Players	Average rating	Points	MP
33	Australia	Jamieson, Fuller, Shaw, Woodhams, Pope, Purdy	2286	39	
34	Iran	Harandi, Sharif, Shirazi, Sawadkuhi, Shahsavar, Safarzadeh	2320	34½	
35	Brazil	Mecking, Câmara, van Riemsdijk, Segal, Nóbrega, Toth	2424	32½	
36	Mongolia	Lhagva, Ujtumen, Myagmarsuren, Gungabazar, Tumurbator, Purevzhav	2364	31½	
37	Ireland	MacGrillen, Littleton, Cox, Henry, Heidenfeld, Cassidy	2245	30½	
38	Chile	Sánchez, Velasco, Bugueño, Letelier, Grunberg, Ojeda	2384	30	17
39	Indonesia	Ardiansyah, Sampouw, Suwuh, Bessaria, Sinulingga, Damanik	2249	30	14
40	Greece	Makropoulos, Skalkotas, Trikaliotis, Vizantiadis, Tsouros, Gavrilakis	2263	27½	16
41	Mexico	Campos López, Frey, Escondrillas, Ramírez, Lara, Ocampo	2283	27½	14
42	Turkey	Onat, Pekün, Bilyap, Olgaç, Erözbek, Süer	2265	27	
43	Singapore	Pang Kwok Leong, Leow, Lee Chee Seng, Choong Liong On, Lim Kok Ann, Chia	2219	25	
44	Venezuela	Cherem, Gamboa, Sánchez, Caro, Mijares, Guerra	2203	24½	
45	New Zealand	Fairhurst, Sarapu, Garbett, Green, Stuart, Kerr	2230	22½	
46	Ecuador	Yépez, Idrovo, Camatón, Verduga, Galarza, Dillon	2213	22	
47	Syria	Rifai S., Kassabe, Tabba, Arik A., Albaba M., Kabbani M.	2200	16	
WD	South Africa	Friedgood, Kroon, Korostenski, de Villiers, Bloch, Aalbersberg	2228	-	

Final D
#	Country	Players	Average rating	Points	MP
48	Pakistan	Butt, Farooqui, Ahmad N., Ahmad I., Mir, Ali	2200	49½	
49	Puerto Rico	Torres, Moraza Choisme, Colón Romero A., Freyre, Bird Picó, Falcón	2203	44½	
50	Dominican Republic	Delgado, Gonzáles, Juliao, Pérez, Pérez Nivar, Yabra	2200	43½	
51	Luxembourg	Feller, Milbers, Peters, Schammo, Schneider, Philippe	2201	38½	
52	Lebanon	Tarazi, Daoud, Thomas, Loheac-Ammoun, Sursock, Bedrossian	2206	35	20
53	Uruguay	Lamas Baliero, Bademian Orchanian, Ricetto, Pastori, Maiztegui Casas, Israel Catán	2200	35	17
54	Panama	Ramón Martínez, Fabrega, Cuéllar, Moreno Merediz, Lombana, Denis	2200	33	
55	Monaco	Tasic, Brodeur, Scharf, Kostjoerin, Martelli R., Angles d'Auriac	2200	29½	
56	Malta	Camilleri, Attard, Gouder, Cilia Vincenti, Casha, Soler	2206	29	
57	Hong Kong	Kan Wai Shui, Hasan, Ko Chi, Krouk, Sin Kuen, Smith M.	2240	27½	13
58	Faroe Islands	Apol, Petersen, Midjord, Olsen, Thomsen, Ziska	2200	27½	12
59	Malaysia	Chan Mun Fye, Foo Lum Choon, Choo Min Wang, Wahid, Jamaluddin, Ng	2200	24½	
60	Morocco	Bakali, Nejjar, Sbia, Iraqui, Meftouh, Dakka	2200	21½	
61	Jordan	Al-Mallah, Arafat, Hamam, Sanoseyan, Baslan M., Haddad	2200	17½	
62	Guernsey	Palmer, Withers, Moriarty, Gavey, Savident, Knight	2200	12	2
63	United States Virgin Islands	Abraham, Purington, Reussner, Scherman A., Scherman N., Fyfe-Reussner, Bushnaq	2200	12	2

Final E
#	Country	Players	Average rating	Points
64	Rhodesia	Donnely, Fox, Barlow, Levy, Hillmann, Hope M.	2200	28½
65	Iraq	Al-Shakarchi, Mubarak, Al-Kazzaz R. K., Taha, Muhsin F., Subbar	2200	24½
66	Netherlands Antilles	Weiland, Zalm, Van Loon, Fernán, Croes, Rigaud O. W.	2200	21½
67	Japan	Gonda, Naito, Hamada, Arita, Tatsutomi, Seki	2200	20½
68	Cyprus	Riza, Scoatarin, Vassiades, Hadjittofis, Kleopas, Hadjiyiannis	2200	19
69	Trinidad and Tobago	Mohipp A., Brassington F., Ramon-Fortune, Sears, Lee, Poon A. C.	2200	18
70	Algeria	Chaabi, Bouzida M., Baghli, Hanni F.	2200	17
71	Andorra	Gómez Abad, Sanz, De la Casa, Iglesias, Pantebre Martínez, Fité Barris	2200	13
72	Bahamas	Antonas, Thompson, Rolle, Adderley, Ramcharran, Ingraham	2200	11
73	British Virgin Islands	Hook, Van Dyke B., Green S. L., Pickering, Downing, Van Dyke	2200	8½

=== Final «A» ===
- Matches played in semi-finals are italicized.

Place	Country	1	2	3	4	5	6	7	8	9	10	11	12	13	14	15	16	+	-	=	Points
1	Soviet Union	-	2½	3	2	3	2	3½	3½	3	3	3½	4	2½	2½	4	4	13	0	2	46
2	Yugoslavia	1½	-	1½	2	2½	1	2½	2	3½	2	3	3½	3	3½	2	4	8	3	4	37½
3	United States	1	2½	-	1½	2½	2	1½	3	2½	3	2	3	3½	2½	3½	2½	10	3	2	36½
4	Bulgaria	2	2	2½	-	2	1½	2	2	2	3	3	3	3	2	2½	4	7	1	7	36½
5	Netherlands	1	1½	1½	2	-	2	2	2	2½	2½	3½	2½	2½	3	3	4	8	3	4	35½
6	Hungary	2	3	2	2½	2	-	2½	1	1½	2½	1	2½	2½	3½	3	3½	9	3	3	35
7	West Germany	½	1½	2½	2	2	1½	-	2	2	2½	2½	2½	2	2½	3	3	7	3	5	32
8	Romania	½	2	1	2	2	3	2	-	2	2	2	2	3	1	2½	2½	4	3	8	29½
9	Czechoslovakia	1	½	1½	2	1½	2½	2	2	-	3	1	1½	2	3	3½	2½	5	6	4	29½
10	England	1	2	1	1	1½	1½	1½	2	1	-	2	2	2	2	2	3½	1	7	7	26
11	Philippines	½	1	2	1	½	3	1½	2	3	2	-	1	1	2	2½	2½	4	7	4	25½
12	Spain	0	½	1	1	1½	1½	1½	2	2½	2	3	-	2	2½	1½	3	4	8	3	25½
13	Sweden	1½	1	½	1	1½	1½	2	1	2	2	3	2	-	2	1½	2½	2	8	5	25
14	Argentina	1½	½	1½	2	1	½	1½	3	1	2	2	1½	2	-	2	1½	1	9	5	23½
15	Finland	0	2	½	1½	1	1	1	1½	½	2	1½	2½	2½	2	-	2½	3	9	3	22
16	Wales	0	0	1½	0	0	½	1	1½	1½	½	1½	1	1½	2½	1½	-	1	14	0	14½

=== Final «B» ===
- Matches played in semi-finals and not played are italicized.

Place	Country	17	18	19	20	21	22	23	24	25	26	27	28	29	30	31	32	+	-	=	Points
17	Israel	-	1½	3	3	1	2	2	3½	2½	3	3	3	3½	3½	3	3	11	2	2	40½
18	Austria	2½	-	2½	2	2½	2	2	1½	2½	2½	2	4	2	3½	3½	3½	9	1	5	38½
19	Italy	1	1½	-	3	2	2½	3½	3½	3	1½	2½	3	4	2½	1½	3	10	4	1	38
20	Colombia	1	2	1	-	1½	2	2	2	2	2½	3	2½	3	2½	2½	3	7	3	5	32½
21	Norway	3	1½	2	2½	-	2½	2	2½	2½	2½	1	1½	1½	2	2½	2½	8	4	3	32
22	Iceland	2	2	1½	2	1½	-	2½	2	2	2	2½	2	2½	2	3	2½	5	2	8	32
23	Poland	2	2	½	2	2	1½	-	1½	2½	3	3	2	2	2	3	3	5	3	7	32
24	Canada	½	2½	½	2	1½	2	2½	-	3	½	2½	2½	1½	3½	3½	2½	8	5	2	31
25	Cuba	1½	1½	1	2	1½	2	1½	1	-	2½	2½	2½	2½	2	3½	3½	6	6	3	31
26	Denmark	1	1½	2½	1½	1½	2	1	3½	1½	-	1½	2	2½	3½	3	2½	6	7	2	31
27	Switzerland	1	2	1½	1	3	1½	1	1½	1½	2½	-	2	2	2	3	3½	4	7	4	29
28	France	1	0	1	1½	2½	2	2	1½	1½	2	2	-	2	3½	2½	2	3	6	6	27
29	Scotland	½	2	0	1	2½	1½	2	2½	1½	1½	2	2	-	1½	2	3	3	7	5	25½
30	Belgium	½	½	1½	1½	2	2	2	½	2	½	2	½	2½	-	2½	2½	3	7	5	23
31	Portugal	1	½	2½	1½	1½	1	1	½	½	1	1	1½	2	1½	-	2½	2	12	1	19½
32	Tunisia	1	½	1	1	1½	1½	1	1½	½	1½	½	2	1	1½	1½	-	0	14	1	17½

- Tunisia refused to play Israel because of political reasons. The score was set by default.

=== Final «C» ===
- Matches played in semi-finals and not played are italicized.

Place	Country	33	34	35	36	37	38	39	40	41	42	43	44	45	46	47	WD	+	-	=	Points
33	Australia	-	1½	3	3	4	1	2	3½	4	3	4	2½	2½	2½	2½	2½	11	2	1	39
34	Iran	2½	-	1	3	1½	3½	2	2	3	2	3	2½	3	3	2½		9	2	3	34½
35	Brazil	1	3	-	2½	3	3	2	2½	1½	2½	1½	2	3	2	3	2	8	3	3	32½
36	Mongolia	1	1	1½	-	2	1½	3	1½	½	3½	3½	3	3	2½	4	2½	7	6	1	31½
37	Ireland	0	2½	1	2	-	2½	2½	3½	1	1½	2½	2½	1½	4	3½	2	8	5	1	30½
38	Chile	3	½	1	2½	1½	-	2½	3	1½	3	2	2	3	2½	2	2½	7	4	3	30
39	Indonesia	2	2	2	1	1½	1½	-	2	1½	3	2½	2½	3	1½	4	3	5	5	4	30
40	Greece	½	2	1½	2½	½	1	2	-	2½	2	2	2½	2½	3	3		6	4	4	27½
41	Mexico	0	1	2½	3½	3	2½	2½	1½	-	2	2	2	2	1½	1½	1	5	5	4	27½
42	Turkey	1	2	1½	½	2½	1	1	2	2	-	2	2½	2½	3	3½	½	5	5	4	27
43	Singapore	0	1	2½	½	1½	2	1½	2	2	2	-	2½	3	2	2½	1½	4	5	5	25
44	Venezuela	1½	1½	2	1	1½	2	1½	1½	2	1½	1½	-	2	2½	2½	2½	2	8	4	24½
45	New Zealand	1½	1	1	1	2½	1	1	1½	2	1½	1	2	-	2½	3	1½	3	9	2	22½
46	Ecuador	1½	1	2	1½	0	1½	2½	1	2½	1	2½	1½	1½	-	2½	1	3	9	2	22
47	Syria	1½	1½	1	0	½	2	0	1	2½	½	1½	1½	1	1½	-		1	12	1	16
WD	South Africa	½		2	1½	2	1½	1		3	3½	2½	1½	2½	3		-				

- South Africa were expelled from FIDE with three rounds to go and withdrew from the event. Their scores were set as friendlies.

=== Final «D» ===
- Matches played in semi-finals are italicized.

Place	Country	48	49	50	51	52	53	54	55	56	57	58	59	60	61	62	63	+	-	=	Points
48	Pakistan	-	2	2½	3½	1½	3	3½	3½	3½	4	3	3½	4	4	4	4	13	1	1	49½
49	Puerto Rico	2	-	2	3	2	3	2	3½	3½	3½	2½	3	3½	3	4	4	11	0	4	44½
50	Dominican Republic	1½	2	-	1	3½	3	3½	3½	2	3	3	2½	4	4	4	3	11	2	2	43½
51	Luxembourg	½	1	3	-	2½	3	1½	2	2½	2½	3	3	3	4	3½	3½	11	3	1	38½
52	Lebanon	2½	2	½	1½	-	2	2½	2	2½	2	2	3	3	2	4	3½	7	2	6	35
53	Uruguay	1	1	1	1	2	-	3½	2	3½	2½	2	2	2	4	4	3½	6	4	5	35
54	Panama	½	2	½	2½	1½	½	-	2½	2	2	3	3	3	3	4	3	8	4	3	33
55	Monaco	½	½	½	2	2	2	1½	-	1½	2½	2	3½	2	3	2½	3½	5	5	5	29½
56	Malta	½	½	2	1½	1½	½	2	2½	-	1	1½	2½	2½	3	4	3½	6	7	2	29
57	Hong Kong	0	½	1	1½	2	1½	2	1½	3	-	2½	3	2	1½	3	2½	5	7	3	27½
58	Faroe Islands	1	1½	1	1	2	2	1	2	2½	1½	-	2½	2	2½	1½	3½	4	7	4	27½
59	Malaysia	½	1	1½	1	1	2	1	½	1½	1	1½	-	3½	2½	3½	2½	4	10	1	24½
60	Morocco	0	½	0	1	1	2	1	2	1½	2	2	½	-	1½	2½	4	2	9	4	21½
61	Jordan	0	1	0	0	2	0	1	1	1	2½	1½	1½	2½	-	2	1½	2	11	2	17½
62	Guernsey	0	0	0	½	0	0	0	1½	0	1	2½	½	1½	2	-	2½	2	12	1	12
63	United States Virgin Islands	0	0	1	½	½	½	1	½	½	1½	½	1½	0	2½	1½	-	1	14	0	12

=== Final «E» ===
- Matches played in semi-finals and not played are italicized.

Place	Country	64	65	66	67	68	69	70	71	72	73	+	-	=	Points
64	Rhodesia	-	2½	4	3	3½	2	3	3	4	3½	8	0	1	28½
65	Iraq	1½	-	2	3	2	2	2	4	3½	4	4	1	4	24½
66	Netherlands Antilles	0	2	-	1	3½	2	3½	4	2	3	4	2	3	21
67	Japan	1	1	3	-	2½	3	2½	2	2½	2½	6	2	1	20
68	Cyprus	½	2	½	1½	-	2½	2½	3	3	3½	5	3	1	19
69	Trinidad and Tobago	2	2	2	1	1½	-	2	2	2½	3	2	2	5	18
70	Algeria	1	2	½	1½	1½	2	-	3	3	2½	3	4	2	17
71	Andorra	1	0	0	2	1	2	1	-	3	3	2	5	2	13
72	Bahamas	0	½	2	1½	1	1½	1	1	-	2½	1	7	1	11
73	British Virgin Islands	½	0	1	1½	½	1	1½	1	1½	-	0	9	0	8½

- Iraq and Algeria refused to play Rhodesia because of political reasons. The scores were set by default.

=== Individual medals ===
- Board 1: (Soviet Union) Anatoly Karpov 12 / 14 = 85.7%
- Board 2: (Austria) Andreas Dückstein 10 / 12 = 83.3%
- Board 3: (Soviet Union) Boris Spassky 11 / 15 = 73.3%
- Board 4: (Soviet Union) Tigran Petrosian 12½ / 14 = 89.3%
- 1st reserve: (Soviet Union) Mikhail Tal 11½ / 15 = 76.7%
- 2nd reserve: (United States) James Tarjan and (Netherlands) Franciscus Kuijpers 11 / 13 = 84.6%
