= Chilean Chess Championship =

National chess championship of Chile

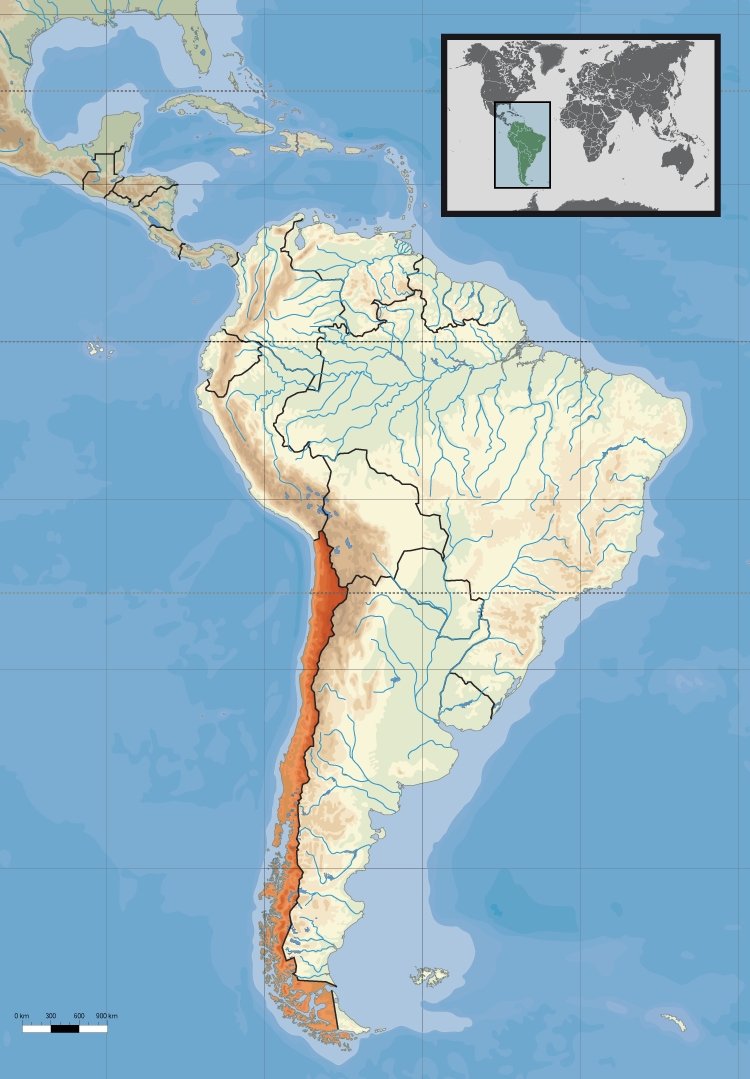
Map showing the area of South America

The Chilean Chess Championship is the national chess championship of Chile organised by the FENACH (Federacion Nacional de Ajedrez de Chile). In 2004–2006 there was also a championship organised by the FEDAC (Federación Deportiva de Ajedrez de Chile).

== Winners ==
Year	Winner
1920	Carlos Peralta
1922	Otto Junge
1924	Mariano Castillo
1926	Mariano Castillo
1927	Mariano Castillo
1929	Mariano Castillo
1931	Rodrigo Flores
1932	Enrique Reed
1934	Mariano Castillo
1935	Rodrigo Flores
1937	Julio Salas Romo
1938	Rodrigo Flores
1940	Mariano Castillo
1941	Rodrigo Flores
1944	Rodrigo Flores
1946	Tulio Pizzi
1948	Mariano Castillo
1949	Mariano Castillo
1950	Rodrigo Flores
1951	Rodrigo Flores
1952	Rodrigo Flores
1953	Mariano Castillo
1954	Julio Salas Romo
1955	Julio Salas Romo
1956	Rodrigo Flores
1957	René Letelier
1958	Moisés Stekel
1959	René Letelier
1960	René Letelier
1961	Rodrigo Flores
1962	Julio Salas Romo
1964	René Letelier
1965	Rodrigo Flores
1966	Walter Ader Hausman
1968	David Godoy Bugueño
1969	Carlos Silva Sánchez
1970	Pedro Donoso Velasco
1971	Carlos Silva Sánchez
1972	René Letelier
1974	Carlos Silva Sánchez
1975	Carlos Silva Sánchez
1976	Carlos Silva Sánchez
1977	Pedro Donoso Velasco
1978	Pedro Donoso Velasco
1979	Javier Campos Moreno
1980	Javier Campos Moreno
1981	Iván Morovic
1982	Roberto Cifuentes
1983	Roberto Cifuentes
1984	Roberto Cifuentes
1985	Roberto Cifuentes
1986	Roberto Cifuentes
1987	Fernando Rosa
1988	Cristhian Montero Martinez
1989	Rodrigo Vasquez Schroder
1990	Hernán Salazar
1991	Jorge Egger Mancilla
1992	Rodrigo Vasquez Schroder
1993	Christian Michel
1994	Eduardo Arancibia
1995	Luis Rojas Keim
1996	Jorge Egger Mancilla
1997	Luis Valenzuela Fuentealba
1998	Christian Michel Yunis
1999	Jorge Egger Mancilla
2000	Miguel Lobos Barrenechea
2001	Luis Valenzuela Fuentealba
2002	Luis Rojas Keim
2003	Luis Dobson Aguilar
2004	Rodrigo Vasquez Schroder
2005	Alvaro Valdés Escobar
2006	Eduardo Arancibia Guzmán
2007	Mauricio Flores Ríos
2008	Hugo López Silva
2009	Rodrigo Vasquez Schroder
2010	Alvaro Valdés Escobar
2011	Pablo Salinas Herrera
2012	Pablo Salinas Herrera
2013	Rodrigo Vasquez Schroder
2014	Cristóbal Henríquez
2015	Matias Perez Gormaz
2016	Luis Valenzuela Fuentealba
2017	Cristóbal Henríquez
2018	Cristóbal Henríquez
2019	Pablo Salinas Herrera
2020	Not held due to the COVID-19
2021	Pablo Salinas Herrera
2022	Pablo Salinas Herrera
2023	Pablo Salinas Herrera
2024	Cristobal Henriquez Villagra
2025	Matias Perez Gormaz
2026	Rodrigo Vasquez Schroder

Nr	Year	Women's winner
1	2010	Damaris Abarca González
2	2011	María José Toro Pradenas
3	2012	Damaris Abarca González
4	2013	Valentina Jorquera Cabello
5	2014	Damaris Abarca González
6	2015	Constanza Bernal Hurtado
7	2016	Valentina Jorquera Cabello
8	2017	Sofia Pinilla Delgado
9	2018	Valentina Jorquera Cabello
10	2019	Damaris Abarca González
11	2020	Javiera Gómez Barrera
12	2021	Not held due to the COVID-19
13	2022	Javiera Gómez Barrera
14	2023	Damaris Abarca González
15	2024	Valentina Jorquera
16	2025	Francisca Sanchez Tobar
17	2026	Rocio Contreras Suazo

The winners of the FEDACH competition were Luis Rojas Keim (2004) and Mauricio Flores Ríos (2005, 2006).
