= René Letelier =

Chilean chess player (1915–2006)

Personal information
- Born: René Letelier Martner; February 21, 1915 San Bernardo, Chile
- Died: July 2, 2006 (aged 91) Santiago de Chile

Chess career
- Country: Chile
- Title: International Master (1960)
- Peak rating: 2375 (May 1974)

René Letelier Martner (1915–2006) was a Chilean chess player with the title of International Master. His finest international tournament win was in 1954, when he took the UNESCO tournament in Montevideo as clear first ahead of joint Ossip Bernstein and Miguel Najdorf, beating both in their individual game.

== Biography ==
He played in many Chilean Chess Championships. In 1932, he took 4th place (Enrique Reed won). In 1934, he took 2nd, behind Mariano Castillo. Finally, Letelier was Chilean Champion in 1957, 1959, 1960, 1964, and 1973.

He played for Chile in seven Chess Olympiads.

- In 1939, at third board in 8th Chess Olympiad in Buenos Aires (+4 –8 =1);
- In 1950, at third board in 9th Chess Olympiad in Dubrovnik (+4 –5 =6);
- In 1956, at second board in 12th Chess Olympiad in Moscow (+5 –3 =9);
- In 1960, at first board in 14th Chess Olympiad in Leipzig (+7 –4 =8);
- In 1964, at first board in 16th Chess Olympiad in Tel Aviv (+4 –7 =5);
- In 1966, at first board in 17th Chess Olympiad in Havana (+4 –6 =7);
- In 1974, at fourth board in 21st Chess Olympiad in Nice (+3 –4 =1).

In tournaments, Letelier tied for 11-12th at Mar del Plata 1936 (Isaías Pleci won). In 1937, he took 2nd, behind Rodrigo Flores, in São Paulo. In 1938, he tied for 12-14th in Montevideo (Alexander Alekhine won).

In 1945, he took 5th in Viña del Mar (Carlos Guimard won). In 1945, he tied for 2nd-5th with Carlos Skalicka, Enrique Reinhardt and Moshe Czerniak in Quilmes (Gideon Ståhlberg won). In 1946, he tied for 1st with Skalička, followed by Movsas Feigins, Jorge Pelikán, etc., in Buenos Aires (Circulo La Regence). In 1946, he took 3rd, behind Gideon Ståhlberg and Hermann Pilnik, in Paraná. In 1946, he took 11th in Mar del Plata (Miguel Najdorf won).

In 1947, he took 2nd, behind Ståhlberg, in Buenos Aires (3rd Grau Memorial). In 1947, he took 4th in Buenos Aires (Moshe Czerniak won). In 1948, he tied for 4-5th in Buenos Aires (Najdorf won). In 1949, he tied for 6-9th in Mar del Plata (Héctor Rossetto won). In 1949, he tied for 2nd-3rd, behind Guimard, in Velez Sarsfield. In 1950, he tied for 5-7th in Venice (Alexander Kotov won).

In 1951, he took 8th in Mar del Plata/Buenos Aires (1st zonal; Erich Eliskases and Julio Bolbochán won). In 1951/52, he took 3rd in San Rafael (Eliskases won). In 1952, he tied for 11-13th in Mar del Plata (Bolbochán and Rossetto won). In 1953, he tied for 6-7th in Mar del Plata (Svetozar Gligorić won).

In 1954, he won, ahead of joint runners-up Ossip Bernstein and Miguel Najdorf, at the Gran Torneio Internacional Unesco in Montevideo (18 players). This was Letelier's finest tournament win. Letelier beat both grandmasters in the field, Najdorf and Bernstein!

In 1955, he took 12th in Mar del Plata (Boris Ivkov won). In 1957, he tied for 7-8th in Rio de Janeiro (3rd zonal; Oscar Panno won). In 1958, he tied for 11-12th in Mar del Plata (Bent Larsen won). In 1959, he took 7th in Lima (Ivkov and Luděk Pachman won). In 1959, he tied for 9-10th in Santiago (Ivkov and Pachman won).

In 1959, he took 5th in Mar del Plata (Najdorf and Pachman won). In 1960, he took 4th in Asunción (Gligorić and László Szabó won). In 1960, he tied for 8-10th in São Paulo (4th zonal; Julio Bolbochán won). In 1960, he took 7th in Mar del Plata (Boris Spassky and Bobby Fischer won).

In 1961, he took 6th in Santa Fe (Robert Byrne won). In 1961, he took 6th in Mar del Plata (Najdorf won). In 1962, he tied for 15-16th in Mar del Plata (Lev Polugaevsky won). In 1963, he tied for 3rd-5th in Havana (Pan-American; Eleazar Jiménez won). In 1963, he took 13th in Havana (2nd Capablanca Memorial; Viktor Korchnoi won).

In 1964, he took 17th in Buenos Aires (Tigran Petrosian and Paul Keres won). In 1964, he tied for 17-18th in Havana (3rd Capablanca Memorial; Vasily Smyslov and Wolfgang Uhlmann won). In 1964, he took 5th in Jerusalem. In 1965, he took 9th in Santiago (Smyslov won). In 1966, he tied for 10-11th in Havana (Pan-American; Jimenez won). In 1967, he took 15th in Havana (5th Capablanca Memorial; Larsen won).

In 1969, Letelier won the 2nd edition of the annually played international Mar del Plata Open. In 1971, he took 15th in Havana (8th Capablanca Memorial; Vlastimil Hort won). In 1972, he tied for 6-9th in La Serena (Vladimir Savon won). In 1975, he tied for 8-11th in Buenos Aires (Samuel Schweber won).

Letelier was awarded the International Master (IM) title in 1960.

== Notable chess games ==
- René Letelier vs Jacobo Bolbochán, Mar del Plata 1936, Queen's Gambit Declined, Semi-Slav, D46, 1-0
- René Letelier vs Miguel Najdorf, Montevideo 1954, King's Indian, Sämisch Variation, E80, 1-0
- Robert James Fischer vs René Letelier Martner, Mar del Plata 1959, Ruy Lopez, Closed, Chigorin, C97, 0-1
