= Pedro Donoso Velasco =

Chilean chess player (1944–2001)

Pedro Donoso
Personal information
- Born: Pedro H. Donoso Velasco; 26 February 1944 Santiago, Chile
- Died: 8 September 2001 (aged 57)

Chess career
- Country: Chile
- Title: FIDE Master (1984)
- Peak rating: 2435 (January 1979)

Pedro H. Donoso Velasco (26 February 1944 – 8 September 2001) was a Chilean chess FIDE master (FM), three-time Chilean Chess Championship winner (1970, 1977, 1978) and Pan American Chess Championship bronze medalist (1977).

== Biography ==
From the early 1970s to the early 1980s, Donoso was one of Chile's leading chess players. In the Chilean Chess Championships he won three gold medals (1970, 1977, 1978). Pedro Donoso Velasco participated in the World Chess Championship South American zonal tournament (1975) and the Pan American Chess Championship (1974, 1977), winning a bronze medal in the latter in 1977.

Donoso played for Chile in the Chess Olympiads:

- In 1974, at the second board in the 21st Chess Olympiad in Nice (+9, =6, -3),
- In 1976, at the second board in the 22nd Chess Olympiad in Haifa (+6, =3, -3),
- In 1978, at the first board in the 23rd Chess Olympiad in Buenos Aires (+5, =4, -4),
- In 1980, at the first reserve board in the 24th Chess Olympiad in La Valletta (+3, =2, -3).

Donoso played for Chile in the Pan American Team Chess Championship:

- In 1971, at the first board in the 1st Panamerican Team Chess Championship in Tucuman (+4, =2, -1), winning an individual silver medal.

Donoso was known as a chess trainer. His students included Grandmaster Iván Morovic and other prominent Chilean chess players.

Donoso died of cancer.
