= Jens Kølbæk =

Danish chess player (1945–2024)

Personal information
- Born: 1945
- Died: 13 April 2024 (aged 78–79)

Chess career
- Country: Denmark

Jens Kølbæk (1945–13 April 2024), was a Danish chess player and two-times Danish Chess Championship medalist in 1976 and 1977.

== Biography ==
From the mid-1960s to the mid-1970s Jens Kølbæk was one of the leading Danish chess players. He participated many times in the finals of Danish Chess Championships and won two silver medals: 1976 and 1977. Jens Kølbæk participated in European Junior Chess Championship (1964/65) and Nordic Chess Championship (1973).

Jens Kølbæk played for Denmark in the Chess Olympiads:

- In 1974, at first reserve board in the 21st Chess Olympiad in Nice (+7, =4, −5),
- In 1976, at third board in the 22nd Chess Olympiad in Haifa (+1, =3, −3).

Jens Kølbæk played for Denmark in the European Team Chess Championship preliminaries:

- In 1973, at eight board in the 9th European Team Chess Championship preliminaries (+1, =4, −0).

Jens Kølbæk played for Denmark in the Nordic Chess Cup:

- In 1974, at fourth board in the 5th Nordic Chess Cup in Eckernförde (+0, =4, −1) and won team bronze medal,
- In 1975, at second board in the 6th Nordic Chess Cup in Hindås (+2, =2, −1) and won team silver and individual gold medals,
- In 1976, at second board in the 7th Nordic Chess Cup in Bremen (+1, =3, −1) and won team bronze medal.

Jens Kølbæk played for Denmark in the World Student Team Chess Championships:

- In 1964, at third board in the 11th World Student Team Chess Championship in Kraków (+3, =6, −3),
- In 1965, at second board in the 12th World Student Team Chess Championship in Sinaia (+7, =3, −3) and won team bronze medal,
- In 1966, at fourth board in the 13th World Student Team Chess Championship in Örebro (+4, =5, −1) and won team bronze medal,
- In 1967, at first reserve board in the 14th World Student Team Chess Championship in Harrachov (+4, =3, −1),
- In 1968, at fourth board in the 15th World Student Team Chess Championship in Ybbs (+1, =4, −2),
- In 1969, at third board in the 16th World Student Team Chess Championship in Dresden (+4, =5, −2).

After a failure in the Danish Chess Championship in 1978, Jens Kølbæk retired from active chess play. He returned to chess only after retirement. Jens Kølbæk was participant of the World Senior Chess Championships in 2011 and 2014, European Senior Chess Championship in 2016, European Senior Team Chess Championship in 2017.
