= Peter Toth (chess player) =

Brazilian chess player

Personal information
- Born: 7 September 1940 (age 85)

Chess career
- Country: Brazil
- Title: FIDE Master (2004)
- Peak rating: 2320 (May 1974)

Peter Toth (born 7 September 1940) is a Brazilian chess FIDE master (FM).

== Biography ==
In the first half of 1970s Peter Toth was one of Brazil's leading chess players. He regularly participated in Brazilian Chess Championships. His best results was shared 3rd-5th place in 1970 and ranked 4th after play-off in 1972. Peter Toth twice participated in Pan American Chess Championships (2009, 2019).

Peter Toth played for Brazil in the Chess Olympiads:

- In 1970, at fourth board in the 19th Chess Olympiad in Siegen (+2, =4, -4),
- In 1972, at fourth board in the 20th Chess Olympiad in Skopje (+8, =4, -2),
- In 1974, at second reserve board in the 21st Chess Olympiad in Nice (+3, =3, -4).

Peter Toth played for Brazil in the World Student Team Chess Championship:

- In 1968, at third board in the 15th World Student Team Chess Championship in Ybbs (+4, =6, -3).
