= Mogens Moe =

Danish chess player (born 1944)

Personal information
- Born: 13 March 1944 (age 82)

Chess career
- Country: Denmark
- Title: FIDE Master (1991)
- Peak rating: 2380 (July 1971)

Mogens Moe (born 13 March 1944), is a Danish chess FIDE Master (FM), two-times Danish Chess Championship medalist (1968, 1969).

== Biography ==
From the late 1960s to the mid-1970s Mogens Moe was one of the leading Danish chess players. He participated many times in the finals of Danish Chess Championships and won two silver medals: 1968 and 1969 (after lost the play-off match with Ole Jakobsen - 2½:3½ (+1, =3, -2)). Mogens Moe participated in World Junior Chess Championship (1963) and Nordic Chess Championship (1973). He was a regular participant in the annual Copenhagen open chess tournaments.

Mogens Moe played for Denmark in the Chess Olympiads:

- In 1970, at fourth board in the 19th Chess Olympiad in Siegen (+7, =5, -3),
- In 1974, at third board in the 21st Chess Olympiad in Nice (+4, =3, -5).

Mogens Moe played for Denmark in the European Team Chess Championship preliminaries:

- In 1970, at reserve board in the 8th European Team Chess Championship preliminaries (+3, =1, -0).

Mogens Moe played for Denmark in the Nordic Chess Cup:

- In 1972, at second board in the 3rd Nordic Chess Cup in Großenbrode (+0, =2, -2) and won team silver medal.

Mogens Moe played for Denmark in the World Student Team Chess Championships:

- In 1964, at second board in the 11th World Student Team Chess Championship in Kraków (+3, =2, -7),
- In 1966, at first reserve board in the 13th World Student Team Chess Championship in Örebro (+7, =1, -0) and won team bronze and individual gold medals,
- In 1967, at fourth board in the 14th World Student Team Chess Championship in Harrachov (+4, =2, -3),
- In 1968, at second board in the 15th World Student Team Chess Championship in Ybbs (+4, =5, -3).
