= Andrew Jonathan Whiteley =

English chess player (1947–2014)

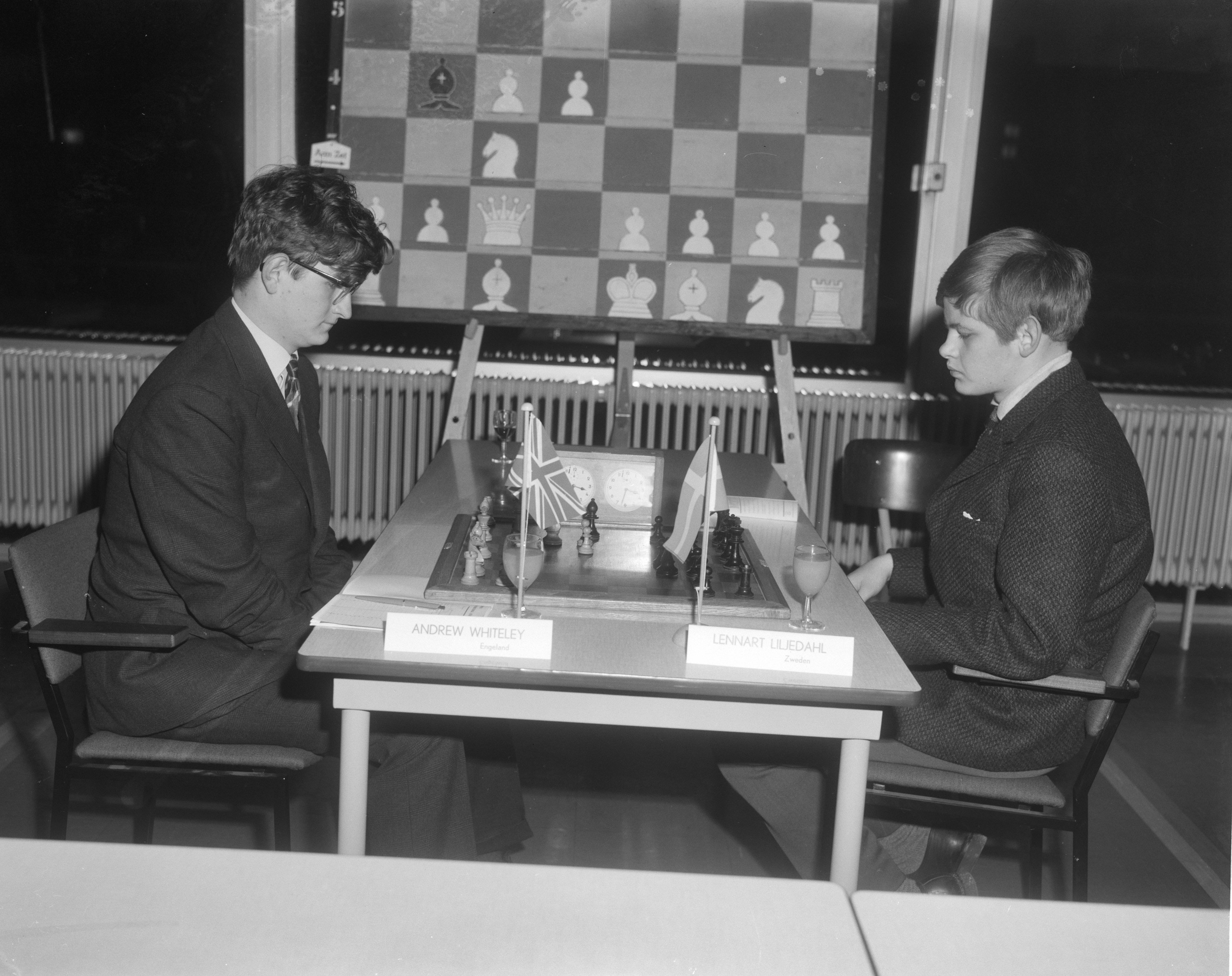

Personal information
- Born: 9 June 1947 Birmingham, England
- Died: 7 July 2014 (aged 67) Cornwall, England

Chess career
- Country: England
- Title: International Master (1988)
- Peak rating: 2395 (January 1977)

Andrew Jonathan Whiteley (9 June 1947 – 7 July 2014) was an English chess player, who held the titles International Master (IM) (1988) and FIDE International Arbiter (1990).

== Biography ==
In 1965/1966, in Groningen Whiteley shared first place with Hans Ree in the International Junior Chess tournament (unofficial European Junior Chess Championship). In 1965, he won the British Junior Chess Championship in U21 age group. In 1971, he finished clear second in the British Chess Championship, half a point behind the winner, Ray Keene. In 1988, he was awarded the FIDE International Master (IM) title and received the FIDE International Arbiter (IA) title two years later. In 2008, Whiteley won the British Senior Chess Championship in the S60 age group.

Whiteley played for England in the Chess Olympiads:

- In 1970, at first reserve board in the 19th Chess Olympiad in Siegen (+5, =7, -1),
- In 1972, at first reserve board in the 20th Chess Olympiad in Skopje (+8, =3, -1),
- In 1974, at fourth board in the 21st Chess Olympiad in Nice (+7, =6, -2).

Whiteley played for England in the European Team Chess Championships:

- In 1973, at fifth board in the 5th European Team Chess Championship in Bath (+1, =3, -2),
- In 1977, at sixth board in the 6th European Team Chess Championship in Moscow (+0, =2, -4),

Whiteley played for England in the World Student Team Chess Championships:

- In 1966, at first reserve board in the 13th World Student Team Chess Championship in Örebro (+5, =0, -2),
- In 1967, at fourth board in the 14th World Student Team Chess Championship in Harrachov (+6, =2, -3) and won team bronze medal,
- In 1968, at third board in the 15th World Student Team Chess Championship in Ybbs (+4, =5, -1).

Whiteley played for England in the Clare Benedict Chess Cups:

- In 1972, at fourth board in the 19th Clare Benedict Chess Cup in Vienna (+1, =1, -3) and won team and individual gold medals,
- In 1973, at reserve board in the 20th Clare Benedict Chess Cup in Gstaad (+2, =2, -1) and won team silver medal,
- In 1974, at third board in the 21st Clare Benedict Chess Cup in Cala Galdana (+4, =1, -1) and won team and individual gold medals.

Whiteley graduated from Pembroke College, Oxford and later worked as solicitor.
