= Ulrichsen =

Ulrichsen is a Norwegian surname. Notable people with the surname include:

- Jarl Henning Ulrichsen (born 1947), Norwegian chess master
- Kjell Christian Ulrichsen (born 1944), Norwegian businessperson
- Kjell Ulrichsen (born 1944), Norwegian curler
