= Hurme =

Hurme is a Finnish surname. Notable people with the surname include:

- Harri Hurme (1945–2019), Finnish chess master
- Juha Hurme (born 1959), Finnish playwright and writer
- Jani Hurme (born 1975), Finnish ice hockey player
- Jarkko Hurme (born 1986), Finnish footballer
- Risto Hurme (born 1950), Finnish modern pentathlete and fencer
