= Dumitru Ghizdavu =

Romanian chess player (born 1949)

Personal information
- Born: 21 May 1949 (age 77)

Chess career
- Country: Romania; United States
- Title: International Master (1972)
- FIDE rating: 2415 (July 2026)
- Peak rating: 2450 (July 1973)

Dumitru Ghizdavu (born 21 May 1949) is a Romanian and American chess International Master (1972).

== Biography ==
In the second half of the 1960s and in the 1970s, Dumitru Ghizdavu was one of the leading Romanian youth chess players. In 1967, Dumitru Ghizdavu won third place in International junior chess tournament in Riga. In 1972, he was awarded the FIDE International Master (IM) title.

Dumitru Ghizdavu played for Romania in the Chess Olympiads:

- In 1972, at first reserve board in the 20th Chess Olympiad in Skopje (+6, =4, -2),
- In 1974, at fourth board in the 21st Chess Olympiad in Nice (+9, =7, -2).

Dumitru Ghizdavu played for Romania in the European Team Chess Championship:

- In 1973, at fourth board in the 5th European Team Chess Championship in Bath (+2, =1, -4).

Dumitru Ghizdavu played for Romania in the World Student Team Chess Championship:

- In 1966, at fourth board in the 13th World Student Team Chess Championship in Örebro (+3, =3, -3),
- In 1968, at first board in the 15th World Student Team Chess Championship in Ybbs (+2, =6, -4),
- In 1972, at first board in the 19th World Student Team Chess Championship in Graz (+2, =9, -2).

Dumitru Ghizdavu played for Romania in the Men's Chess Balkaniads:

- In 1971, at fourth board in the 3rd Men's Chess Balkaniad in Athens (+4, =0, -0) and won team gold and individual gold medals,
- In 1972, at fourth board in the 4th Men's Chess Balkaniad in Sofia (+1, =2, -1) and won team bronze medal,
- In 1973, at fifth board in the 5th Men's Chess Balkaniad in Poiana Brașov (+1, =3, -0) and won team silver and individual silver medal.

Dumitru Ghizdavu emigrated to the United States in the mid-1970s. In 1977, in Mentor he shared 10th-12th place in U.S. Chess Championship.

Dumitru Ghizdavu has not participated in chess tournaments in last years.
