= Michel Benoit =

French chess player

Personal information
- Born: 18 January 1949 (age 77) Lyon, France

Chess career
- Country: France
- Peak rating: 2290 (July 1991)

Michel Benoit (born 18 January 1949), is a French chess player, French Chess Championship winner (1973).

== Biography ==
From the late 1960s to the early 1980s, Michel Benoit was among the leading French chess players. In 1973, in Vittel he won French Chess Championship.

Michel Benoit played for France in the Chess Olympiad:

- In 1974, at second reserve board in the 21st Chess Olympiad in Nice (+5, =2, -4).

Michel Benoit played for France in the World Student Team Chess Championships:

- In 1968, at first board in the 15th World Student Team Chess Championship in Ybbs (+1, =4, -5),
- In 1969, at first board in the 16th World Student Team Chess Championship in Dresden (+2, =3, -3).

Michel Benoit played for France in the Men's Chess Mitropa Cup:

- In 1978, at fourth board in the 3rd Chess Mitropa Cup in Ciocco (+4, =0, -2) and won individual gold medal,
- In 1981, at third board in the 6th Chess Mitropa Cup in Luxembourg (+0, =1, -3).

In the 1990s-2000s Michel Benoit participated mainly in Open chess tournaments and team chess competitions.
