= Damaris Abarca =

Chilean constituent and chess player (born 1990)

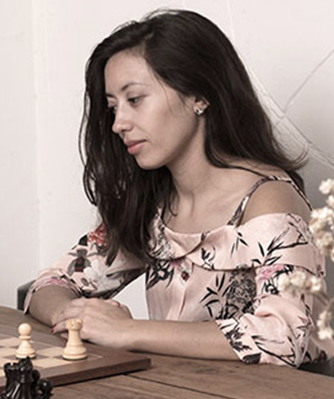

Member of the Constitutional Convention
- In office 4 July 2021 – 4 July 2022
- Constituency: 15th District

Personal details
- Born: 27 February 1990 (age 36) Rancagua, Chile
- Party: Independent
- Education: University of Chile (LL.B)
- Occupation: Constituent
- Profession: Lawyer
- Chess career
- Country: Chile
- Title: Woman FIDE Master (2012)
- Peak rating: 2092 (August 2016)

Damaris Nicole Abarca González (born 27 February 1990) is a Chilean politician and chess player. She is a five-time women's chess champion and the former president of the Chess Federation of Chile. Abarca has been a member of the Constitutional Convention since 2021.

== Early life and education ==
Abarca was born in Rancagua, Chile, on 27 February 1990 and spent her childhood in the town of Rosario. At the age of 15, she and her family moved to the nearby city of Rengo. During this time, she became a regional student leader during the 2006 student protests in Chile known as the Penguins' Revolution.

She studied Philosophy and later Law at the University of Chile, but had to temporarily pause her law studies due to a diagnosis of lupus in 2011.

== Chess career ==
Abarca learnt to play chess during her childhood by observing her father teach her older brothers, eventually joining them in games. By the age of 13, she had won a local chess competition and later became the youth champion of Chile in the under-14, under-16, and under-18 categories. In 2009, she trained as a referee for the International Chess Federation in Mexico.

In 2010, at the age of 20, she was the all-age female chess champion of Chile, qualifying for the 39th Chess Olympiad in Russia. Two years later, she received the title of Woman FIDE Master (WFM) at the International Chess Federation in Istanbul.

Abarca advocates for feminist causes and gender equality in chess, and she is a member of the Commission for the Development of Women in the International Chess Federation for Latin America. Along with her female counterparts, she founded the Chilean Women's Chess Players' Association and has served as its president since 2017, aiming to provide greater opportunities for women and young girls in the sport. In 2018, she became the first female president of the Chess Federation of Chile.

In 2018, she won the National Women's Chess Championship and qualified for the 44th Chess Olympiad. In 2023, she won the National Women's Chess Championship again, qualifying for the 45th Chess Olympiad in Budapest, which was her seventh consecutive appearance.

She has been the director of the Ajedrez por un sueño programme ("Chess for a Dream" in English) since 2020, which is part of the Fundación ECAM in Chile.

== Political career ==
Abarca registered as a candidate for the 2021 Chilean Constitutional Convention election for district 15 as part of the Apruebo Dignidad pact, running as an independent candidate under the Social Convergence party, and was elected. Already within the Convention, she joined the Provisional Ethics Commission and serves as coordinator of the Fundamental Rights Commission with Matías Orellana of the Socialist Collective.
