= Rodrigo Vásquez Schroeder =

Chilean chess grandmaster (born 1969)

Rodrigo Vásquez

Personal information
- Born: Rodrigo Rafael Vásquez Schroeder; December 6, 1969 (age 56) Santiago, Chile

Chess career
- Country: Chile
- Title: Grandmaster (2004)
- FIDE rating: 2452 (November 2026)
- Peak rating: 2561 (January 2005)

Rodrigo Rafael Vásquez Schroeder (born December 6, 1969) is a Chilean chess player holding the title of grandmaster. He won the Chilean Chess Championship in 1989, 1992, 2004, 2009, 2013 and 2026.

== Chess career ==
Vásquez Schroder played for Chile in the Chess Olympiads of 1990, 1998, 2004, 2010, 2012, 2014, 2016 and 2024. He played in the FIDE World Chess Championship 2004 and was eliminated in the first round by Francisco Vallejo Pons.
