= Roberto Cifuentes =

Chilean chess grandmaster (born 1957)

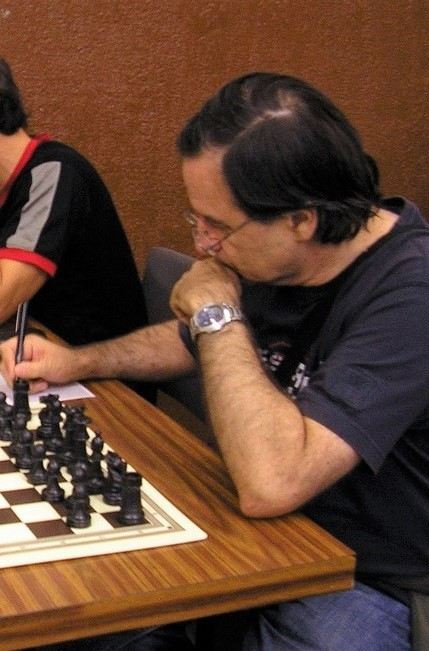

Personal information
- Born: Roberto Alejandro Cifuentes Parada; December 21, 1957 (age 68) Santiago, Chile

Chess career
- Country: Chile (until 1993); Netherlands (1993-2004); Spain (since 2004)
- Title: Grandmaster (1991)
- Peak rating: 2543 (July 2004)

Roberto Alejandro Cifuentes Parada (born 21 December 1957, Santiago, Chile) is a Chilean chess grandmaster.

== Chess career ==
He has won the Chilean Chess Championship five times (1982–1986), and played seven times for Chile in the Chess Olympiad (1978–1990). He has also represented Chile twice in the Panamerican Team Chess Championship (1985 and 1987), and won individual gold and bronze and team silver and bronze medals. He tied for 5-6th at San Pedro de Jujuy 1981 (Pan American Chess Championship, won by Zenon Franco), won at Asunción 1986, took 6th at Santiago de Chile 1987 (the 13th Torneo Zonal Sudamericano), and took 2nd, behind Mikhail Tal, at Rio Hondo 1987.

Cifuentes then he left Chile for the Netherlands, where he took 2nd in the Dutch Chess Championship in 1993. He represented the Netherlands in the period 1992–2001. Among other results, he took 3rd in the 30th Capablanca Memorial in 1995. Next, Cifuentes moved to Spain and played for his new country in the 36th Chess Olympiad in 2004.

Cifuentes was awarded the grandmaster title in 1991. On the February 2026 FIDE Elo rating list, he had a rating of 2379.

Cifuentes is interested in computer chess and often writes on the subject.
