= Franciscus Kuijpers =

Dutch chess player (1941–2024)

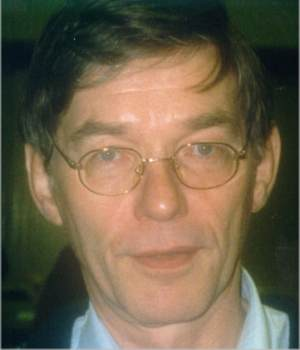

Personal information
- Born: 27 February 1941 Breda, Netherlands
- Died: 25 May 2024 (aged 83)

Chess career
- Country: Netherlands
- Title: International Master (1964)
- Peak rating: 2445 (January 1975)

Franciscus Antonius Kuijpers (27 February 1941 – 25 May 2024), was a Dutch chess International Master (IM) (1964), Dutch Chess Championship winner (1963) and Chess Olympiad three-times team and individual medalist (1974, 1976).

== Biography ==
In 1959 Franciscus Kuijpers represented the Netherlands in the World Junior Chess Championship and ranked 10th. In 1963, he made the biggest success of his chess career, winning the Dutch Chess Championship. Franciscus Kuijpers was winner of many international chess tournaments. In 1964, he was awarded the FIDE International Master (IM) title.

Franciscus Kuijpers played for Netherlands in the Chess Olympiads:

- In 1964, at first board in the 16th Chess Olympiad in Tel Aviv (+5, =4, -7),
- In 1968, at first reserve board in the 18th Chess Olympiad in Lugano (+4, =5, -0),
- In 1974, at second reserve board in the 21st Chess Olympiad in Nice (+11, =0, -2) and won individual gold medal,
- In 1976, at second reserve board in the 22nd Chess Olympiad in Haifa (+4, =2, -1) and won team silver and individual bronze medals.

Franciscus Kuijpers two played for Netherlands in the World Student Team Chess Championships (1961-1962) and in individual competition won gold (1962) medal. Also Franciscus Kuijpers eight times played for Netherlands in the Clare Benedict Chess Cups (1963-1969, 1971) where in team competition won 3 gold (1966, 1969, 1971), 3 silver (1963, 1964, 1968) and bronze (1965) medals, and in individual competition won 3 gold (1963, 1968, 1971) medals.
