= Bertus Enklaar =

Dutch chess player (1943–1996)

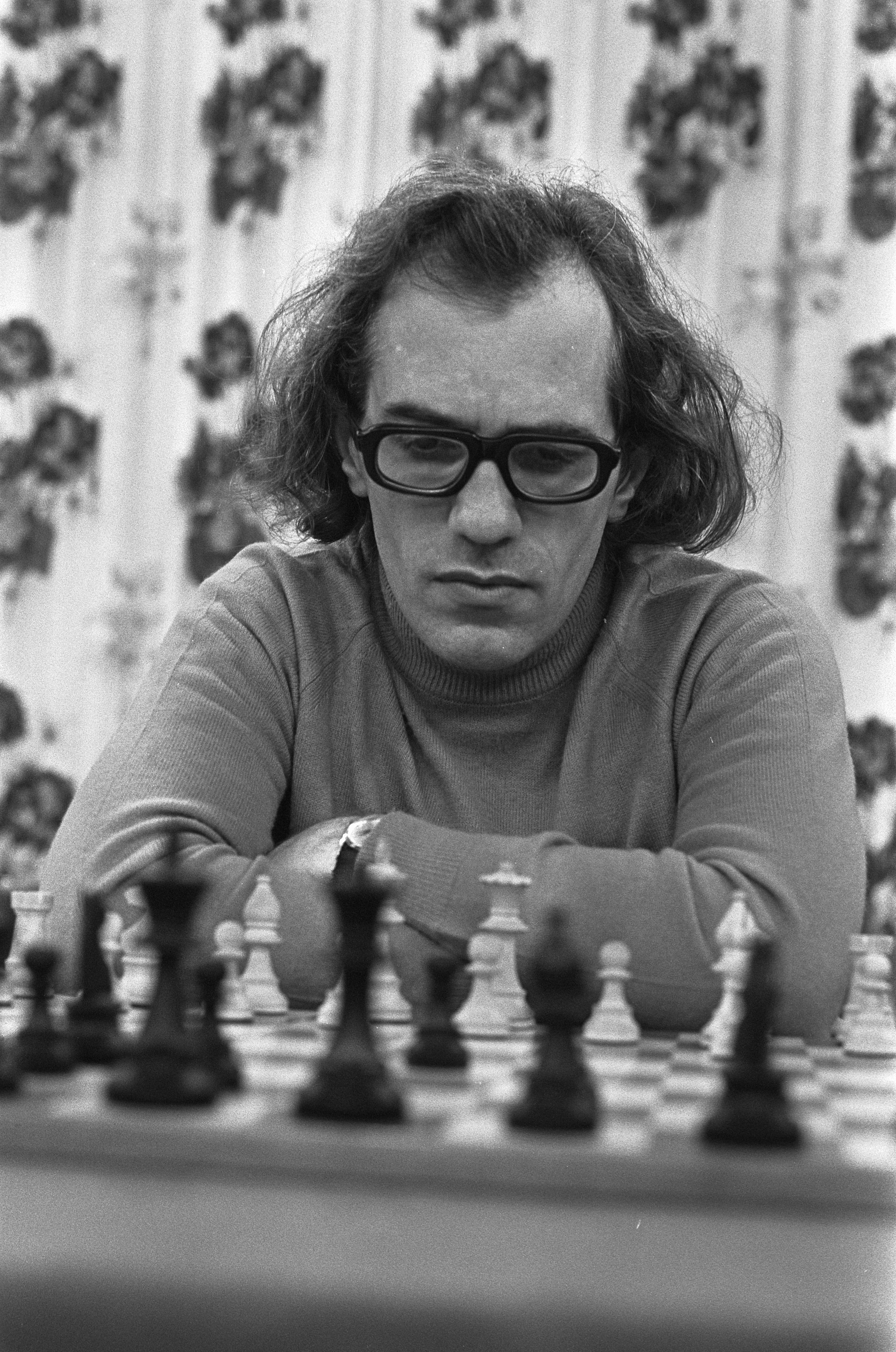
- Bertus Enklaar in 1973

Personal information
- Born: 1 December 1943 Amsterdam, Netherlands
- Died: 3 October 1996 (aged 52) Amsterdam, Netherlands

Chess career
- Country: Netherlands
- Title: International Master (1973)

Bertus Enklaar (1 December 1943 – 3 October 1996) was a Dutch chess International Master (1973).

== Biography ==
Bertus Enklaar was a student of the Barlaeus Gymnasium and studied mathematics in Amsterdam. In the early 1970s, he worked for a short time as a mathematics teacher at the Montessori Lyceum Amsterdam. In the 1980s, Enklaar was a mathematics teacher at the Traffic Academy in Tilburg.

In 1972, Bertus Enklaar and Zoltán Ribli won the B tournament of the Hoogovens Wijk aan Zee Chess Festival. In 1973, he shared first place in the Dutch Chess Championship together with Genna Sosonko and Coen Zuidema. Sosonko then won the additional tournament for the national title. In 1973, he was awarded the FIDE International Master (IM) title. In 1981, Bertus Enklaar won Utrecht Open Chess Championship. In the 1980s and 1990s, he played much less but remained a very strong chess player. Bertus Enklaar has written a number of chess books in which he handles the opening in an understandable way for inexperienced players.

Bertus Enklaar played for Netherlands in the Chess Olympiads:

- In 1972, at second reserve board in the 20th Chess Olympiad in Skopje (+5, =4, -3),
- In 1974, at first reserve board in the 21st Chess Olympiad in Nice (+5, =6, -2).

Bertus Enklaar played for Netherlands in the World Student Team Chess Championship:

- In 1965, at second board in the 12th World Student Team Chess Championship in Sinaia (+4, =3, -6).

Bertus Enklaar played for Netherlands in the Clare Benedict Cup:

- In 1973, at third board in the 20th Clare Benedict Chess Cup in Gstaad (+3, =2, -2).
