= Walter Ader Hausman =

Czech-Chilean chess player

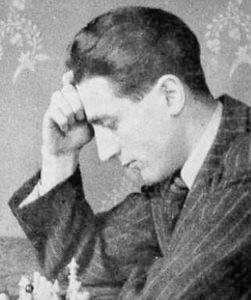

Personal information
- Born: Walter Ader; 7 November 1912 Hodonín, Moravia, Austria-Hungary
- Died: unknown

Chess career
- Country: Czechoslovakia, Chile

Walter Ader Hausman (7 November 1912 – unknown) was a Czech-Chilean chess player. He was the Chilean Chess Championship winner in 1966.

== Biography ==
Walter Ader Hausman was born as Walter Ader in Hodonín. In 1938, he won the championship of the Central Society of Czech Chess Players. After the German occupation of Czechoslovakia in the same year he moved to Chile and changed last name to Walter Ader Hausman. In 1966 Walter Ader Hausman won the Chilean Chess Championship. He participated in a significant number of international chess tournaments held in South America. Walter Ader Hausman twice participated in Pan American Chess Championship: in 1958 in Bogotá he ranked in 10th place, and in 1968 in Cárdenas he shared 6th–7th place.

Walter Ader Hausman played for Chile in the Chess Olympiads:

- In 1956, at third board in the 12th Chess Olympiad in Moscow (+6, =5, -5),
- In 1960, at third board in the 14th Chess Olympiad in Leipzig (+7, =5, -4),
- In 1964, at second board in the 16th Chess Olympiad in Tel Aviv (+2, =6, -8).

Walter Ader Hausman was the publisher and editor-in-chief of the chess magazine Jaque Mate. The year of his death is unknown.
