= Jorge Szmetan =

Argentine chess player

Jorge Szmetan (26 May 1950 – 19 September 2015, Buenos Aires) was an Argentine chess player. He received the FIDE title of International Master (IM) in 1976.

At the beginning of his career, he won at Brasília 1969. He played many times in Argentine Chess Championship, and was a Champion in 1976. He also tied for 4–7th in 1971, tied for 10–11th in 1972, shared 5th in 1973, took 2nd in 1974, took 6th in 1975, shared 5th in 2003, etc.

He took 7th at São Paulo 1972 (zonal, Henrique Mecking won), shared 5th at Fortaleza 1975 (zonal, Raúl Sanguineti won), tied for 5-6th at Buenos Aires Club Argentino 1975 (Samuel Schweber won), took 16th at Corrientes 1985 (zonal, Miguel Quinteros and Iván Morovic won). He was a winner of Third Konex Master Open Tournament at Buenos Aires 1980.

Szmetan thrice represented Argentina in Chess Olympiads at Nice 1974, Haifa 1976, and Buenos Aires 1978.
