= Itchak Radashkovich =

Israeli chess player

Personal information
- Native name: 'יצחק רדשקוביץ
- Born: 4 July 1947 (age 79) Leningrad, Russia

Chess career
- Country: Israel
- Title: International master (IM) (1976)

Itchak Radashkovich (Hebrew: יצחק רדשקוביץ'; born 4 July 1947) is an Israeli chess International master (IM) (1976).

== Biography ==
Itchak Radashkovich began his chess career in a pioneer house and later became a member of the Leningrad youth team. After school, he graduated from the Leningrad Institute of Precision Mechanics and Optics. In early 1968, he took second place in the semifinals of the Burevestnik Chess Championship, thus fulfilling the norm of a Soviet chess master. In the 1969 Leningrad City Chess Championship, which was held as the quarterfinals of the Soviet Chess Championship, he shared second place with three other players. He then took part in the semi-finals of the USSR Chess Championship in Barnaul in 1969 and finished seventh behind Vladimir Antoshin. He received the beauty prize for his game against Anatoly Volovich. At the end of 1969 he reached second place with the selection of his hometown at the Soviet Team Chess Championship in Grozny. In the IV Soviet Chess Championship of Young Masters in 1970 he came with 7,5 points out of 15 on a shared sixth place. In the early 1970s he was one of the presenters of the local television program Chessmaty.

In 1973 Itchak Radashkovich emigrated to Israel and played in the international tournament in Netanya that same year. Lubomir Kavalek entered the list of winners, Radashkovich came first in the side tournament, in which 26 players started. In 1976 he shared 1st-2nd place with Avraham Kaldor in Netanya chess tournament.

Itchak Radashkovich played for Israel in the Chess Olympiad:

- In 1974, at second reserve board in the 21st Chess Olympiad in Nice (+6, =1, -1).

Itchak Radashkovich played for Israel in the European Team Chess Championship preliminaries:

- In 1977, at third board in the 6th European Team Chess Championship preliminaries (+2, =3, -1),
- In 1980, at seven board in the 7th European Team Chess Championship preliminaries (+1, =2, -1).

Itchak Radashkovich played for Israel in the World Student Team Chess Championship:

- In 1974, at first board in the 20th World Student Team Chess Championship in Teesside (+4, =6, -2).

In 1976, Itchak Radashkovich was awarded the FIDE International Master (IM) title.

In 1980s Itchak Radashkovich retired from tournament chess and worked as an entrepreneur in the IT industry and manager.
