= Dan Uddenfeldt =

Swedish chess player

Personal information
- Born: 29 March 1951 (age 75)

Chess career
- Country: Sweden
- Peak rating: 2411 (December 2013)

Dan Uddenfeldt (born 29 March 1951), is a Swedish chess player, Swedish Chess Championship medalist (1972).

== Biography ==
In 1969 Dan Uddenfeldt participated in the World Junior Chess Championship. In 1970, he represented Sweden at the European Junior Chess Championship. In the 1970s Dan Uddenfeldt was one of the leading Swedish chess players. He was silver medalist of the Swedish Chess Championship in 1972. Dan Uddenfeldt repeatedly participated in the traditional Stockholm international chess tournament Rilton Cup.

Dan Uddenfeldt played for Sweden in the Chess Olympiads:

- In 1972, at second reserve board in the 20th Chess Olympiad in Skopje (+3, =5, -3),
- In 1974, at first reserve board in the 21st Chess Olympiad in Nice (+7, =3, -4).

Dan Uddenfeldt played for Sweden in the European Men's Team Chess Championship (preliminaries):

- In 1977, at third board in the 6th European Team Chess Championship preliminaries (+2, =2, -0).

Dan Uddenfeldt played for Sweden in the Nordic Chess Cup:

- In 1971, at fifth board in the 2nd Nordic Chess Cup in Großenbrode (+3, =0, -2) and won team gold medal,
- In 1973, at fourth board in the 4th Nordic Chess Cup in Ribe (+3, =1, -1) and won team silver medal,
- In 1974, at second board in the 5th Nordic Chess Cup in Eckernförde (+1, =3, -1).

In 2017, he with Swedish senior team won bronze medal in World Senior Team Chess Championship.
