= Philippine Chess Championship =

National chess competition

The Philippine Chess Championship is organized by the National Chess Federation of the Philippines (NCFP).

== Champions before 2008 ==
Year	Champion
1908	Fernando Canon
1909–1913	Alvah E. Johnson
1914–1921	Ismael Amado
1922–1924	Leopoldo Lafuente
1925	Jose D. Warren
1926	Datu Alip
1927–1930	Adolfo Gutierrez
1931	Ramon Lontoc Jr.
1932–1933	no tournament held
1934	Datu Sandangan
1935	Ramon Lontoc Jr.
1936	Rogelio Catanjal
1937	Castor Catalbas
1938	Antonio Navarro
1939	William Lucena
1940	Ramon Lontoc Jr.
1941	Ramon Lontoc Jr.
1942	Max Hoeflein
1943	Antonio Arce
1944–1945	tournament not held
1946	Horacio P. Tagle
1947	Ramon Lontoc Jr.
1948	Antonio Navarro
1949	Ramon Lontoc Jr.
1950	Rosendo Bandal Sr.
1951	Serafin Alvarez
1952	Jose Pascual
1953	Meliton Borja
1954	tournament not held
1955	Jose Pascual
1956	Florencio Campomanes, Ramon Lontoc Jr.
1957	Meliton Borja
1958	Ramon Lontoc Jr.
1959	Jose Pascual
1960	Florencio Campomanes
1961	Rosendo Balinas
1963	Rodolfo Tan Cardoso
1964	Rosendo Balinas
1965	Renato Naranja
1966	Rosendo Balinas
1967	Renato Naranja
1970	Eugenio Torre
1971	Rosendo Balinas
1972	Eugenio Torre
1973	Renato Naranja
1974	Eugenio Torre
1976	Eugenio Torre
1990	Rogelio Antonio
1996	Rogelio Barcenilla
1998	Buenaventura Villamayor
2001	Eugenio Torre
2002	Eugenio Torre
2004	Darwin Laylo
2006	Darwin Laylo

== Battle of the Grandmasters ==
Since 2008 the final stages of both the open and women's championship, dubbed "Battle of the Grandmasters", have been round-robin tournaments held concurrently.

Year	Place	Open Champion	Women's Champion
2008	Manila	John Paul Gomez	Catherine Pereña
2009	Dapitan	Wesley So	Shercila Cua
2010	Tagaytay	Wesley So	Rulp Ylem Jose
2011	Manila	Wesley So	Rulp Ylem Jose
2012	Kalibo	Mark Paragua	Catherine Pereña
2013	Manila	John Paul Gomez, on tiebreak over Oliver Barbosa	Janelle Mae Frayna
2014	Manila	Eugenio Torre	Catherine Pereña
2015	Manila	Richard Bitoon	Jan Jodilyn Fronda
2016	Manila	Rogelio Antonio Jr.	Janelle Mae Frayna
2017	Manila	Haridas Pascua	Bernadette Galas
2018		Haridas Pascua	
2019	Quezon	Rogelio Barcenilla	Jan Jodilyn Fronda
2020			
2021	Cebu for open, Quezon City, Manila for women's	Daniel Quizon	Janelle Mae Frayna
2024	Malolos	Darwin Laylo	
2025	Quezon City, Manila	Jan Emmanuel Garcia	Mhage Gerriahlou Sebastian

== Juniors & Girls Division ==
Year	Place	Junior Champion	Girl's Champion
2002			
2003			
2004			
2005			
2006			
2007		Wesley So	
2008			
2009			
2010			
2011			
2012			
2013			
2014			
2015			
2016			
2017			
2018			
2019			
2020			
2021	Quezon City, Manila	Alekhine Nouri	Mhage Gerriahlou Sebastian

== See also ==
- Professional Chess Association of the Philippines
