= Otto Junge =

Chilean-German chess player

Carlos Otto Junge (March 2, 1887, Concepción, Chile – June 9, 1978, Eutin, Germany) was a Chilean–German chess master.

He was Chilean Champion in 1922. The Junge family moved from Chile to Germany in 1930. They lived in Hamburg, and played (father and son) in Hamburger Schachklub in the 1930s. Otto Junge became a member of NSDAP (German Nazi Party) in 1932. He was the father of Klaus Junge.

Otto Junge was a chairman of Allgemeiner Turn- und Sportverein Cuxhaven in 1930–1939, 1944–1945, and 1947–1953.
