= Jerzy Pokojowczyk =

Polish chess player (1949–2020)

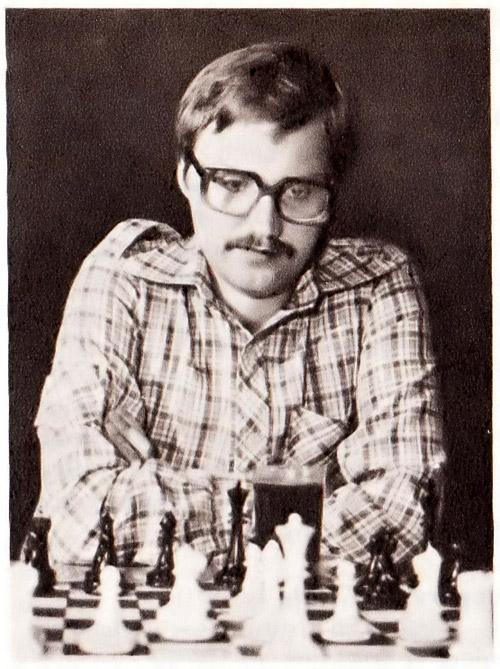

Personal information
- Born: 21 February 1949 Gmina Walim, Poland
- Died: 10 May 2020 (aged 71)

Chess career
- Country: Poland
- Title: International Master (IM) (1978)

Jerzy Pokojowczyk (21 February 1949 – 10 May 2020), was a Polish chess International Master (IM) (1978), two-times Polish Chess Championship medalist (1976, 1981).

== Biography ==
From the end of 1960s to the end of 1980s Jerzy Pokojowczyk was one of the leading Polish chess players. He twice in row won two silver medals in Polish Junior Chess Championships (1968, 1969). In 1969 he represented Poland at the European Junior Chess Championship and shared 12th-13th place. Jerzy Pokojowczyk participated twelve times in Polish Chess Championships and achieved his best results in 1976, when he won silver medal, and in 1981, when he won bronze medal. Jerzy Pokojowczyk with chess club KS Łączność Bydgoszcz also won two medals in Polish Team Chess Championships: gold (1978) and bronze (1974). Jerzy Pokojowczyk was winner of international chess tournaments in Rzeszów (1977) and Subotica (1981), and prize-winner at the Rubinstein Memorial (1980), chess tournaments in Słupsk and Prague (both in 1978).

Jerzy Pokojowczyk played for Poland in the Chess Olympiads:

- In 1974, at first reserve board in the 21st Chess Olympiad in Nice (+3, =3, -2),
- In 1980, at second reserve board in the 24th Chess Olympiad in La Valletta (+1, =0, -3).

Jerzy Pokojowczyk played for Poland in the European Team Chess Championship preliminaries:

- In 1980, at reserve board in the 7th European Team Chess Championship preliminaries (+0, =1, -1),
- In 1983, at sixth board in the 8th European Team Chess Championship preliminaries (+0, =4, -0).

In 1978, Jerzy Pokojowczyk was awarded the FIDE International Master (IM) title. In 1989, he retired from active chess tournament practice.
