= Julio Salas Romo =

Chilean chess player

Personal information
- Born: 18 February 1913
- Died: unknown

Chess career
- Country: Chile

Julio Salas Romo (18 February 1913 – unknown) was a Chilean chess player, four-time Chilean Chess Championship winner (1937, 1954, 1955, 1962).

== Biography ==
From the late 1930s to the early 1960s, Julio Salas Romo was one of Chile's leading chess players. In 1937, he first time won Chilean Chess Championship gaining 6 points in 7 rounds. Julio Salas Romo then repeated this success three more times: 1954, 1955, and 1962. He participated in International Chess Tournaments in São Paulo (1941), Viña del Mar (1945), Montevideo (1954), and Santiago (1957, 1959).

Julio Salas Romo played for Chile in the Chess Olympiads:

- In 1939, at fourth board in the 8th Chess Olympiad in Buenos Aires (+8, =1, -9),
- In 1960, at fourth board in the 14th Chess Olympiad in Leipzig (+5, =4, -7).

The year of his death is unknown.
