= Ramón Lontoc =

Filipino chess player (1917-1998)

Personal information
- Born: 27 August 1917
- Died: 1998

Chess career
- Country: Philippines

Ramón Lontoc Jr. (27 August 1917 – 1998), was a Filipino chess player and eight-time Filipino Chess Championship winner (1931, 1935, 1940, 1941, 1947, 1949, 1956, 1958).

== Biography ==
From the 1930s to the 1970s Ramón Lontoc was one of the strongest Filipino chess players. At the age of five, he learned the rudiments of the game from his father and elder brothers who were themselves strong players. In 1925, at the age of eight, Ramón Lontoc won Filipino Junior Chess Championship. In 1932 he drew his consultation game with Alexander Alekhine in a simultaneous blindfold exhibition during the World Chess champion's visit to Manila. Ramón Lontoc won the Filipino Chess Championship eight times, in 1931, 1935, 1940, 1941, 1947, 1949, 1956, and 1958.

Ramón Lontoc played for the Philippines as the first reserve board at the 1974 Chess Olympiad in Nice, scoring four wins, one draw, and six losses.
