= Meliton Borja =

Filipino chess player

Chess career
- Country: Philippines

Meliton Borja (unknown – unknown), was a Filipino chess player, Chess Olympiad individual bronze medalist (1958), Filipino Chess Championship two-times winner (1953, 1957).

== Biography ==
From the begin of 1950s to the mid of 1960s Meliton Borja was one of Filipino leading chess players. He twice won Filipino Chess Championship: in 1953 and 1957. Meliton Borja has three times represented the Philippine team in the Chess Olympiads (1958, 1960, 1964). In 1958, at third board he won Chess Olympiad individual bronze medal.

By profession Meliton Borja was lawyer.
