= David Godoy Bugueño =

Chilean chess player

Personal information
- Born: 15 January 1944 Ovalle, Chile
- Died: 10 September 2007 (aged 63) Santiago, Chile

Chess career
- Country: Chile
- Title: FIDE Master, International Correspondence Chess Master (2006)
- Peak rating: 2360 (May 1974)

David Godoy Bugueño (15 January 1944 – 10 September 2007) was a Chilean chess FIDE master (FM), International Correspondence Chess master (2006) and Chilean Chess Championship winner (1968).

== Biography ==
From the mid-1960s to the mid-1990s, David Godoy Bugueño was one of Chile's leading chess players. In 1968, he won the Chilean Chess Championship. David Godoy Bugueño participated in World Chess Championship South American Zonal tournaments three times (1966, 1972, 1995). He achieved his greatest success in international chess tournaments in 1991 and 1992, when he twice won open tournaments organized by Magistral Esucomex.

David Godoy Bugueño played for Chile in the Chess Olympiads:

- in 1964, at the first reserve board in the 16th Chess Olympiad in Tel Aviv (+0, =3, -4),
- in 1974, at the third board in the 21st Chess Olympiad in Nice (+8, =3, -6),
- in 1976, at the second reserve board in the 22nd Chess Olympiad in Haifa (+1, =1, -2).

David Godoy Bugueño played for Chile in the Pan American Team Chess Championship:

- in 1971, at the second board in the 1st Panamerican Team Chess Championship in Tucuman (+1, =1, -4).

In his mature years, David Godoy Bugueño participated in correspondence chess tournaments. In 2006, during the 4th Correspondence Chess Olympiad, he fulfilled the norm of the ICCF International Master.

David Godoy Bugueño was also known as a chess journalist. From 1973 to 1981 he collaborated with Las Últimas Noticias, El Cronista (Buenos Aires) and La Nación. In 1978, David Godoy Bugueño was a correspondent for Las Últimas Noticias at the Chess Olympiad in Buenos Aires. Since 1984 he collaborated with the newspaper La Tercera.
