= Eero Raaste =

Finnish chess player (born 1954)

Personal information
- Born: 23 April 1954 (age 72)

Chess career
- Country: Finland
- Title: International Master (1987)
- Peak rating: 2420 (January 1980)

Eero Raaste (born 23 April 1954) is a Finnish chess International Master (IM) (1987), four-times Finnish Chess Championship medalist (1976, 1980, 1983, 1986).

== Biography ==
From the early 1970s to the late 1980s Eero Raaste was one of the leading Finnish chess players. He has won four medals at the Finnish Chess Championships: two silver (1980, 1986) and two bronze (1976, 1983). In 1987, in Espoo he shared 1st-3rd place in International Chess tournament.

Eero Raaste played for Finland in the Chess Olympiads:

- In 1974, at second reserve board in the 21st Chess Olympiad in Nice (+1, =3, -6),
- In 1976, at third board in the 22nd Chess Olympiad in Haifa (+1, =6, -2),
- In 1978, at first reserve board in the 23rd Chess Olympiad in Buenos Aires (+3, =3, -3),
- In 1982, at second reserve board in the 25th Chess Olympiad in Lucerne (+3, =1, -2),
- In 1986, at fourth board in the 27th Chess Olympiad in Dubai (+3, =1, -4).

Eero Raaste played for Finland in the European Team Chess Championships:

- In 1989, at fifth board in the 9th European Team Chess Championship in Haifa (+3, =1, -2).

Eero Raaste played for Finland in the World Student Team Chess Championships:

- In 1972, at second board in the 19th World Student Team Chess Championship in Graz (+1, =7, -6),
- In 1974, at second board in the 20th World Student Team Chess Championship in Teesside (+6, =0, -6).

Eero Raaste played for Finland in the Nordic Chess Cups:

- In 1971, at fifth board in the 2nd Nordic Chess Cup in Großenbrode (+1, =0, -4),
- In 1975, at third board in the 6th Nordic Chess Cup in Hindås (+3, =0, -2) and won team bronze medal,
- In 1977, at second board in the 8th Nordic Chess Cup in Glücksburg (+2, =1, -2).

Also Eero Raaste two times played for Finland in the Telechess Olympiads (1978, 1982).

In 1987, he was awarded the FIDE International Master (IM) title.
