= Harri Hurme =

Finnish chess player (1945–2019)

Personal information
- Born: Harri Heikki Veikko Hurme; 2 June 1945 Helsinki, Finland
- Died: 23 September 2019 (aged 74)

Chess career
- Country: Finland
- Title: FIDE Master (1980); International Solving Master (1993)
- Peak rating: 2380 (January 1980)

Harri Heikki Veikko Hurme (2 June 1945 – 23 September 2019) was a Finnish chess FIDE Master (FM) (1980), International Solving Master (1993) and three-time Finnish Chess Championship silver medalist (1971, 1974, 1978).

== Biography ==
In the 1970s, Harri Hurme was one of the top Finnish chess players. He won three silver medals at the Finnish Chess Championships (1971, 1974, 1978).

Harri Hurme played for Finland in the Chess Olympiads:

- in 1974, at the fourth board in the 21st Chess Olympiad in Nice (+5, =1, -5),
- in 1978, at the third board in the 23rd Chess Olympiad in Buenos Aires (+4, =2, -3),
- in 1980, at the third board in the 24th Chess Olympiad in La Valletta (+5, =2, -2).

Harri Hurme played for Finland in the World Student Team Chess Championships:

- in 1968, at the second reserve board in the 15th World Student Team Chess Championship in Ybbs (+5, =2, -3),
- in 1969, at the first reserve board in the 16th World Student Team Chess Championship in Dresden (+3, =2, -6).

Harri Hurme played for Finland in the Nordic Chess Cups:

- in 1973, at the sixth board in the 4th Nordic Chess Cup in Ribe (+2, =3, -0),
- in 1974, at the fourth board in the 5th Nordic Chess Cup in Eckernförde (+1, =2, -2).

Harri Hurme won several competitions in chess composition. Some of his chess problems were included in the FIDE Album (1971–1973).

== Chess composition ==
Lindroos JT, 1971
2nd prize

Position: g7 white bishop, g6 black pawn, e5 white king, f3 black king, d2 white pawn, g2 white rook, h1 white bishop

Mat in 3 moves

FIDE Album (1971—1973)

1. Ke6!

1... Ke4 2. Rg3+ Kf4 3. Be5#

1... Kf4 2. Rg1 g5 3. Be5#

1... g5 2. Be5 Ke4 (2... g4 3. Rh2#) 3. Rg3#

Subotica Internet Tourney, 2009
2nd prize

Position: d8 white queen, c7 black pawn, c6 white rook, e6 white pawn, f6 white knight, h6 white bishop, e5 black king, g5 black queen, e4 white bishop, g4 white pawn, c3 white pawn, e3 black pawn, a2 white king, e2 white pawn

Mat in 2 moves

1. Bf5! (1. e7? Qg8!).
