= Netanya chess tournament =

Israeli chess event (1961–1983)

The international tournament organised by Israel's Netanya Chess Club started in 1961. The most famous competition took place in 1968 when Robert James Fischer won (scoring 11.5/13) ahead of Daniel Yanofsky and Moshe Czerniak.

== Netanya International Chess Tournament ==
#	Year	Winner
1	1961	Milan Matulović (Yugoslavia); Petar Trifunović (Yugoslavia); Moshe Czerniak (Israel)
2	1964	Yair Kraidman (Israel)
3	1965	Moshe Czerniak (Israel)
4	1968	Robert James Fischer (United States)
5	1969	Samuel Reshevsky (United States)
6	1971	Lubomir Kavalek (United States); Bruno Parma (Yugoslavia)
7	1973	Lubomir Kavalek (United States)
8	1975	Jan Timman (Netherlands)
9	1976	Avraham Kaldor (Israel); Itchak Radashkovich (Israel)
10	1977	Vladimir Liberzon (Israel)
?	?	?
?	1983	Miguel Quinteros (Argentina)
