= Carlos Silva Sánchez =

Chilean chess player (born 1944)

Personal information
- Born: 19 June 1944 (age 82) San Fernando, Chile

Chess career
- Country: Chile
- Title: FIDE Master (1984)
- Peak rating: 2407 (January 1999)

Carlos Silva Sánchez (born 19 June 1944) is a Chilean chess FIDE master (FM) and five-time Chilean Chess Championship winner (1969, 1971, 1974, 1975, 1976).

== Biography ==
From the late 1960s to the early 2000s, Carlos Silva Sánchez was one of Chile's leading chess players. In the Chilean Chess Championships he won 5 gold medals (1969, 1971, 1974, 1975, 1976) and one silver medal (1993). Carlos Silva Sánchez participated in World Chess Championship South American Zonal tournaments six times (1969, 1972, 1975, 1987, 1998, 2000). In 1970, in Havana, he ranked 11th in the 7th Pan American Chess Championship.

Carlos Silva Sánchez played for Chile in the Chess Olympiads:

- In 1974, at the first board in the 21st Chess Olympiad in Nice (+3, =5, -8),
- In 1976, at the first board in the 22nd Chess Olympiad in Haifa (+1, =9, -3),
- In 1978, at the fourth board in the 23rd Chess Olympiad in Buenos Aires (+7, =3, -2),
- In 1980, at the fourth board in the 24th Chess Olympiad in La Valletta (+2, =4, -2),
- In 1984, at the fourth board in the 26th Chess Olympiad in Thessaloniki (+3, =5, -2),
- In 1986, at the fourth board in the 27th Chess Olympiad in Dubai (+3, =5, -3),
- In 1994, at the fourth board in the 31st Chess Olympiad in Moscow (+3, =2, -4),
- In 1998, at the fourth board in the 33rd Chess Olympiad in Elista (+4, =2, -4),
- In 2000, at the fourth board in the 34th Chess Olympiad in Istanbul (+1, =1, -3).

Carlos Silva Sánchez played for Chile in the Pan American Team Chess Championships:

- In 1971, at the fourth board in the 1st Panamerican Team Chess Championship in Tucuman (+3, =1, -1), winning an individual silver medal,
- In 1985, at the fourth board in the 2nd Panamerican Team Chess Championship in Villa Gesell (+3, =2, -1), winning team and individual bronze medals,
- In 1987, at the fourth board in the 3rd Panamerican Team Chess Championship in Junín (+4, =1, -2), winning team and individual silver medals,
- In 1995, at the first board in the 5th Panamerican Team Chess Championship in Cascavel (+3, =1, -2).
