= Matías Orellana =

Chilean constituent

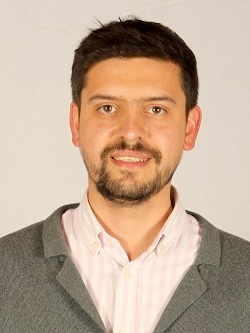

Member of the Constitutional Convention
- In office 4 July 2021 – 4 July 2022
- Constituency: 15th District

Personal details
- Born: 22 December 1988 (age 37) Rancagua, Chile
- Party: Socialist Party
- Education: Universidad Mayor (LL.B)
- Occupation: Constituent
- Profession: Lawyer

Matías Orellana Cuellar (born 22 December 1988) is a Chilean lawyer and politician.

He served as a member of the Constitutional Convention, representing the 15th electoral district of the O'Higgins Region, and acted as coordinator of the Thematic Committee on Fundamental Rights.

== Biography ==
Orellana was born on 22 December 1988 in Rancagua. He is the son of Marco Antonio Orellana Urrutia and Jessica Elena Cuellar Ahumada. He is single.

He completed his primary education at Colegio Santo Tomás in Rancagua and his secondary education at Liceo Comercial Diego Portales in the same city, graduating in 2006. Between 2007 and 2012, he studied law at Mayor University and was admitted to the bar on 22 May 2013.

He worked as a lawyer at the Municipality of Doñihue between June 2013 and April 2014. Subsequently, from April 2014 to December 2016, he served as head of the Legal Department of the Regional Intendancy of the O'Higgins Region.

== Political career ==
Orellana began his career is the Socialist Party (PS). He served as chief of staff of the Regional Government of the O'Higgins Region between January 2017 and March 2018.

In the elections held on 15–16 May 2021, he ran as a candidate for the Constitutional Convention representing the 15th electoral district of the O'Higgins Region as part of the Lista del Apruebo electoral pact, receiving 7,229 votes (3.99% of the validly cast votes).
