= Mauricio Flores Ríos =

Chilean chess grandmaster (born 1990)

Mauricio Flores
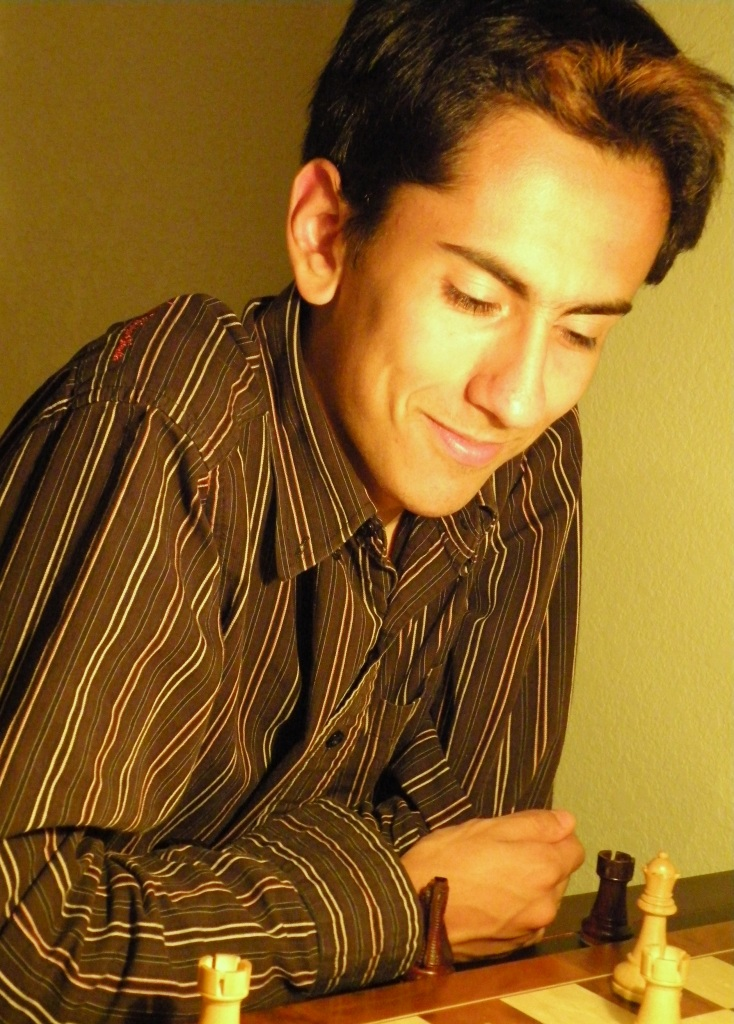

Personal information
- Born: September 10, 1990 (age 35) Valparaíso, Chile

Chess career
- Country: Chile
- Title: Grandmaster (2009)
- FIDE rating: 2529 (August 2026)
- Peak rating: 2537 (September 2013)

Mauricio Flores Rios (born September 10, 1990, in Valparaíso) is a Chilean chess player who holds the Grandmaster title. As of January 2015 he has a FIDE rating of 2531, is number 1 in Chile among active players.

In 2009 Mauricio Flores Rios moved to Brownsville, Texas after being recruited by the University of Texas at Brownsville. He played for UT Brownsville at the Final Four (President's Cup) of 2009, 2010 and 2011, as well as the Pan-American Intercollegiate of 2009-2012.

In 2015, Flores Rios published the book Chess Structures - a Grandmaster Guide, providing a study of the 28 most frequently recurring pawn structures in practice. In 2025 he published the book Chess Imbalances - a Grandmaster Guide, discussing commonly occurring material imbalances such as bishop versus knight, possession of the bishop pair, opposite color bishops, a queen or rook being traded for other pieces, and so on.

== Career ==
He played for Chile in three Chess Olympiads.

- In 2006, at fifth board in 37th Chess Olympiad in Turin (-2 +1 =1).
- In 2012, at third board in 40th Chess Olympiad in Istanbul (+3 -3 =2).
- In 2014, at second board, in 41st Chess Olympiad in Tromso(+3 -2 =4)

== Titles ==
- 1st in the Pan American Sub 16 de Cuenca, Ecuador. (August 2006)
- 1st in the Pan American Sub 18 de Cordova, Argentina. (July 2008)
- 1st in Southwest Collegiate Championships (March 2009)
- 6th Continental Championship in São Paulo, Brazil. (August 2009)
- 1st in US Class Chess Championship (2010)
- 1st in Montcada International Open, Spain. (July 2013)

== Notable games ==
- Mauricio Flores vs Vladimir Burmakin, 2013, Slav Defense: General (D10), 1-0
