= Vladimir Liberzon =

Israeli chess grandmaster (1937–1996)

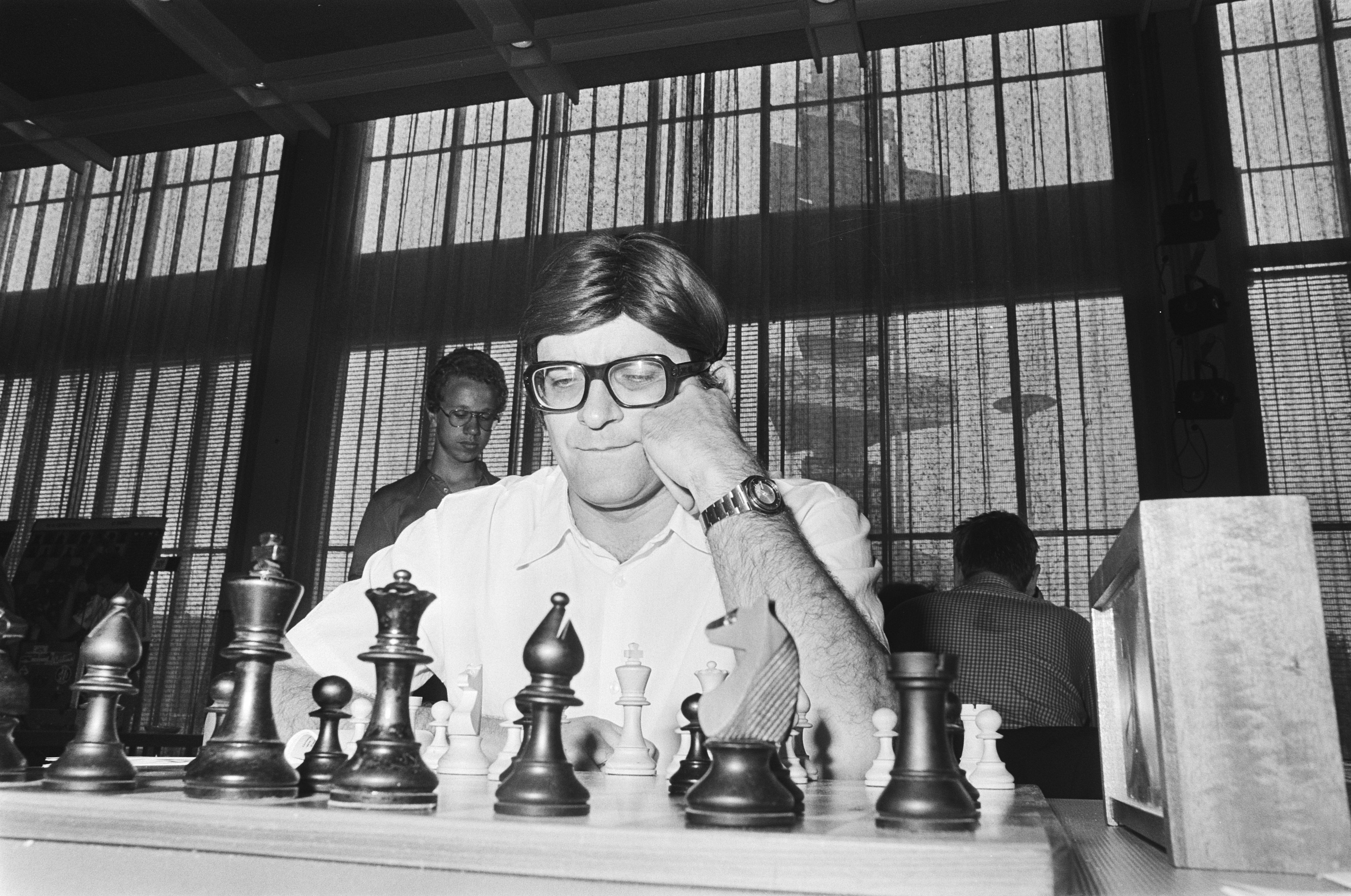
- Liberzon in 1977

Personal information
- Native name: ולדימיר ליברזון
- Born: March 23, 1937 Moscow, Soviet Union
- Died: August 4, 1996 (aged 59) Rehovot, Israel

Chess career
- Country: Soviet Union (until 1973); Israel (after 1973)
- Title: Grandmaster (1966)
- Peak rating: 2555 (January 1978)
- Peak ranking: No. 31 (January 1978)

Vladimir Mikhailovich Liberzon (Hebrew: ולדימיר מיכאילוביץ' ליברזון; Russian: Влади́мир Миха́йлович Либерзо́н; 23 March 1937, in Moscow – 4 August 1996) was a Russian-born Israeli chess grandmaster.

== Biography ==
Liberzon played in several Soviet championships, his best result being fourth at the 36th Championship, Alma-Ata 1968/69. Other results were less notable; his first entry led to a lowly finish at Tbilisi 1966/67, whereas he achieved solid mid-table performances at Moscow 1969 and at Riga 1970.

In tournaments he was first in Moscow (Central Chess Club-ch) in 1963, 1964, and 1965, fourth at Kislovodsk 1964, fifth at Yerevan 1965, second at Leipzig 1965, first at Zinnowitz 1967, first at Debrecen 1968, second at Amsterdam 1969, third at Dubna 1971 and third equal at Luhačovice.

Liberzon was the first grandmaster from the Soviet Union who was allowed to emigrate to Israel in 1973. Consequently, he became Israel's first grandmaster. He won the Israeli Championship in 1974.

Having transferred nationality, he continued to score well in international competitions, finishing first at Venice 1974, first at Lone Pine 1975, second equal at Netanya 1975, second equal at Reykjavík 1975, first equal at Beer-Sheva 1976, first equal at Netanya 1977, 3rd at Amsterdam 1977, first equal at Lone Pine 1979, and fourth equal at Beer-Sheva 1984.

Liberzon played for Israel in four Chess Olympiads.

- In 1974, at first board in 21st Olympiad in Nice (+4 –3 =8);
- In 1976, at first board in 22nd Olympiad in Haifa (+2 –2 =6);
- In 1978, at second board in 23rd Olympiad in Buenos Aires (+1 –2 =6);
- In 1980, at first board in 24th Olympiad in La Valletta (+2 –2 =5).

He was awarded the International Master (IM) title in 1963, and Grandmaster (GM) title in 1965.

According to William Hartston, in The Independent, Liberzon was known for his disciplined professionalism and this made him one of the most consistent performers on the tournament circuit of the 1960s and 70s. His move to Israel was in all likelihood a catalyst for the great chess advances that occurred there in subsequent years. In terms of memorable games, Hartston cites the following effort, from Moscow 1963. It is the rarest of lessons in attacking chess, given that his opponent is none other than tactical maestro and former world champion, Mikhail Tal. Most instructively, Liberzon makes the opposite-coloured bishops work in his favour. White: Vladimir Liberzon Black: Mikhail Tal Nimzo-Indian Defence 1 d4 Nf6 2 c4 e6 3 Nc3 Bb4 4 e3 0-0 5 Bd3 d5 6 a3 dxc4 7 Bxc4 Bd6 8 Nf3 Nc6 9 Nb5 e5 10 Nxd6 Qxd6 11 dxe5 Qxd1+ 12 Kxd1 Ng4 13 Ke1 Ngxe5 14 Nxe5 Nxe5 15 Be2 Bf5 16 Bd2 Nd3+ 17 Bxd3 Bxd3 18 Rc1 Rac8 19 f3 c5 20 Kf2 f5 21 Rhg1 Rc6 22 Bc3 h5 23 h3 Rg6 24 a4 c4 25 Rgd1 Rd8 26 Rd2 Rd5 27 Rcd1 Rb6 28 a5 Rb3 29 Rg1 b5 30 axb6 axb6 31 g4 fxg4 32 hxg4 Rg5 33 gxh5 Rbb5 34 Rdd1 Kf7 35 e4 Kg8 36 Ke3 Kf8 37 Ra1 Rxg1 38 Rxg1 Rxh5 39 Rxg7 Bc2 40 Rb7 b5 41 e5 Bf5 42 Rxb5 Rh6 43 Rb8+ Ke7 44 Rb7+ Kd8 45 Ba5+ Ke8 46 Kf4 Bd3 47 Bb4 Kd8 48 Rg7 Ke8 49 Bd6 Be2 50 Kg5 Rh1 51 f4 Rh5+ 52 Kg6 Rh1 53 e6 Bd3+ 54 Kf6 1-0.

Liberson died in his home of a heart attack; the body was found three days later.

== Other notable games ==
- Vladimir Liberzon vs Efim Geller, Leningrad 1961, Ruy Lopez, Schliemann Defense, C63, 1-0
- Vladimir Liberzon vs Tigran Petrosian, Moscow 1964, French Defense, Winawer Variation, C18, 1-0
- Yaacov Murey vs Vladimir Liberzon, Moscow 1965, Sicilian Defense, Paulsen, Bastrikov Variation, B49, 0-1
- Vladimir Liberzon vs Lajos Portisch, Yerevan 1965, Sicilian Defense, Sozin Variation, B89, 1-0
- Jan Timman vs Vladimir Liberzon, Venice 1974, French Defense, Advance Variation, Main Line, C02, 0-1
- Luděk Pachman vs Vladimir Liberzon, Netanya 1975, King's Indian, Sämisch, Orthodox, E87, 0-1
- Vladimir Liberzon vs Vladimir Tukmakov, Baleares 1989, Sicilian Defense, Richter-Rauzer, Neo-Modern Variation, B66, 1-0

== See also ==
- List of Jewish chess players
