= Enrique Reed =

Chilean chess player (1915–1958)

Personal information
- Born: 15 August 1915
- Died: 11 May 1958 (aged 42)

Chess career
- Country: Chile

Enrique Reed Valenzuela (15 August 1915 – 11 May 1958) was a Chilean chess player, Chilean Chess Championship winner (1932).

== Biography ==
Enrique Reed was a Chilean chess prodigy. In 1927, in Santiago he lost in a fifty move game against Alexander Alekhine in simultaneous exhibition. In 1932, Enrique Reed won Chilean Chess Championship. He participated in International Chess Tournaments in Mar del Plata (1944) and Viña del Mar (1945, 1947).

Enrique Reed played for Chile in the Chess Olympiads:

- In 1939, at reserve board in the 8th Chess Olympiad in Buenos Aires (+10, =1, -5).
