= Jarl Henning Ulrichsen =

Norwegian chess player (born 1947)

Personal information
- Born: 15 July 1947 (age 79)

Chess career
- Country: Norway
- Title: FIDE Master (1985)
- Peak rating: 2350 (January 1975)

Jarl Henning Ulrichsen (born 15 July 1947) is a professor of the New Testament and its context at Norwegian University of Science and Technology in Trondheim and a chess FIDE Master (FM).

== Biography ==
Jarl Henning Ulrichsen received his doctorate from the University of Oslo in 1982 with a dissertation on the Basic Scriptures of the Wills of the Twelve Patriarchs. He has published Textbook in Biblical Hebrew (2006) and Greek-Norwegian dictionary for the New Testament (2009).

Jarl Henning Ulrichsen is also a chess player with the title of FIDE Master from the FIDE. He was a Norwegian senior chess champion on several occasions, most recently at the National Championships in Trondheim in 2014.

Jarl Henning Ulrichsen played for Norway in the Chess Olympiad:

- In 1974, at the first reserve board in the 21st Chess Olympiad in Nice (+6, =5, -1).

Jarl Henning Ulrichsen played for Norway in the Nordic Chess Cup:

- In 1973, at the sixth board in the 4th Nordic Chess Cup in Ribe (+1, =3, -1), winning a team bronze medal.

Jarl Henning Ulrichsen is also known as a chess endgame problemist.
