= Renato Naranja =

Filipino chess player

Personal information
- Born: September 24, 1940 (age 85)

Chess career
- Country: Philippines
- Title: International Master (1969)
- FIDE rating: 2226 (February 2015)
- Peak rating: 2420 (July 1971)

Renato Naranja (born September 24, 1940) is an International Master of chess from the Philippines.

He was Philippine Junior Champion in 1958 and Philippine Adult Champion in 1965. In 1959, he placed 9th in world junior championship U20 in Münchenstein. He played for Philippines in the Chess Olympiads of 1960, 1964, 1966, 1968, 1970 and 1974, playing on Board One in 1964, 1966 and 1970. He also placed first in the 1969 Asian Zonal Tournament in Singapore and subsequently qualified for the 1970 Palma de Mallorca Interzonal on tiebreaks, after drawing his two-game play-off match with co-winner Walter Browne.

While Naranja finished 21st in the 24-player field at Palma, he drew against runaway victor Bobby Fischer, as well as Lajos Portisch and Vasily Smyslov (both of whom failed to qualify for the world championship Candidates Matches by one half-point). One of Naranja's five wins at Palma was against Samuel Reshevsky.

Naranja migrated in U.S. where he works as a computer programmer and where he frequents the Marshall Chess Club, New York.
