= Mariano Castillo =

Chilean chess player (1905–1970)

Mariano Castillo Larenas (25 December 1905 – 23 September 1970) was a Chilean chess master.

Over a period of 30 years, he won the Chilean Chess Championship nine times (1924, 1926, 1927, 1929, 1934, 1940, 1947, 1949, and 1953).

Castillo participated in several international tournaments where took 8th at Mar del Plata it 1928 (Roberto Grau won), tied for 6-10th at Buenos Aires 1934/35 (South American Chess Championship, Luis Piazzini won), tied for 9-10th at Mar del Plata 1936 (Isaías Pleci won), took 6th at Aguas de Sao Pedro/São Paulo 1941 (Erich Eliskases and Carlos Guimard won), took 3rd, behind Guimard and Miguel Najdorf, at Viña del Mar 1945, took 6th at Viña del Mar 1947 (Gideon Ståhlberg won), tied for 14-15th at Mar del Plata 1948 (Eliskases won), tied for 15-16th at Mar del Plata 1950 (Svetozar Gligorić won), took 9th at Venice 1950 (Alexander Kotov won), and tied for 14-15th at Mar del Plata 1954 (zonal, Oscar Panno won).

He played twice on first board for Chile in Chess Olympiads:

- In the 8th Chess Olympiad at Buenos Aires 1939 (+2 –9 =4);
- In the 9th Chess Olympiad at Dubrovnik 1950 (+3 –6 =6).
