= Iván Morovic =

Chilean chess grandmaster (born 1963)

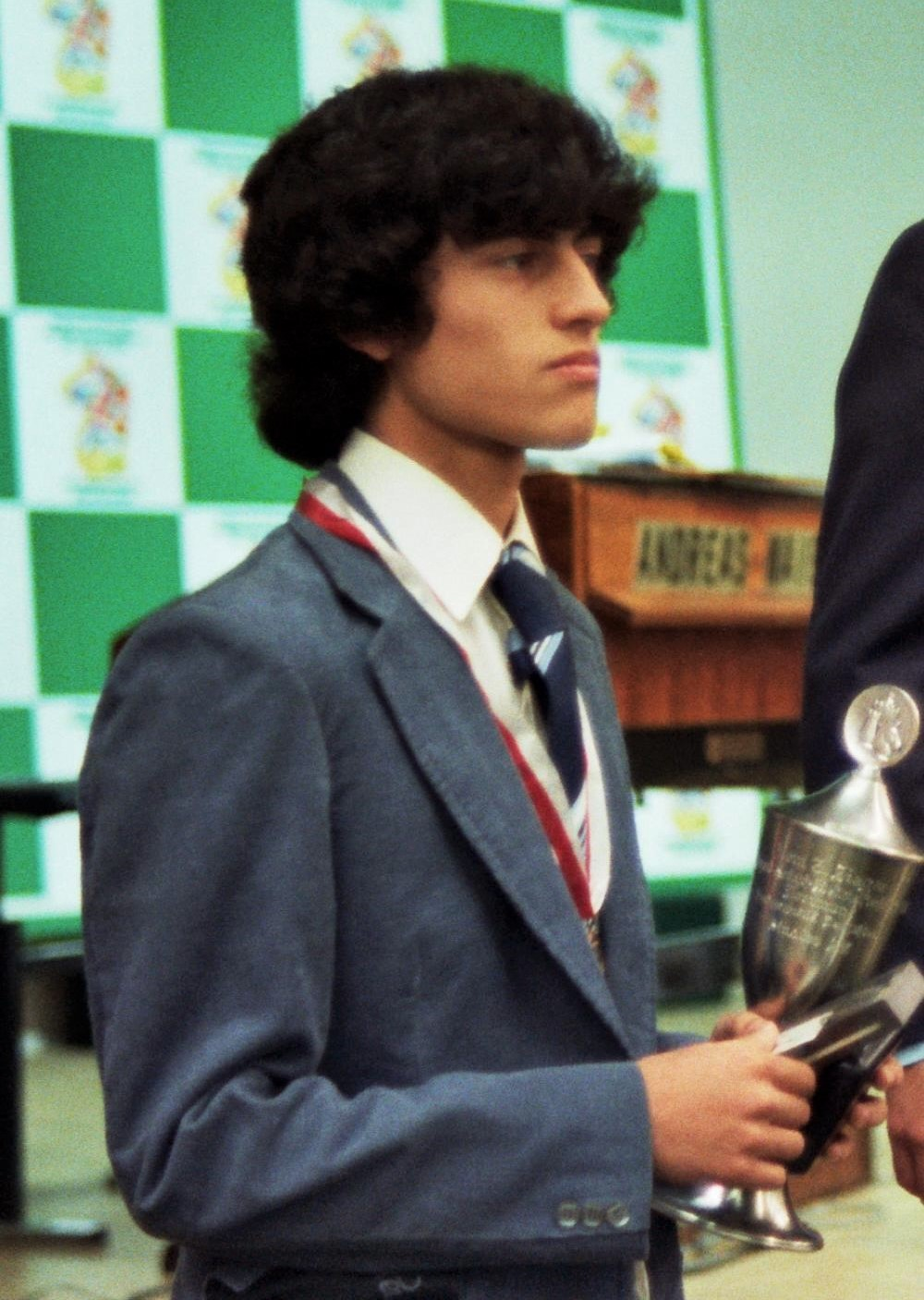
- Iván Morović in 1980 at Dortmund

Personal information
- Born: March 24, 1963 (age 63) Viña del Mar, Chile

Chess career
- Country: Chile; Croatia (1997–2001)
- Title: Grandmaster (1986)
- FIDE rating: 2495 (September 2026)
- Peak rating: 2613 (January 1999)
- Peak ranking: No. 45 (January 1994)

Iván Eduardo Morovic Fernández (born 24 March 1963) is a Chilean chess player with the title of International Grandmaster.

Born in Viña del Mar, he began to play chess at age 9. In 1979 he won the Pan American Junior Chess Championship. In 1980, Morovic took third place in the World Junior Chess Championship in Dortmund, behind Garry Kasparov and Nigel Short. The following year he won the Chilean Chess Championship. At 22 he became the first Chilean to be awarded by FIDE the title of International Grandmaster (GM). His best tournament participation was in 1993, when he won in Las Palmas, ahead of Viswanathan Anand, with whom he drew.

Morovic's best Elo rating is 2613, achieved in 1999.

He took part in thirteen Chess Olympiads, playing for Chile in 1978, 1980, 1982, 1984, 1986, 1988, 1990, 1996, 2002, 2004, 2010 and 2012, and representing Croatia in 2000.
