= Ybbs an der Donau =

Ybbs an der Donau Ybbs aun da Donau
- Municipality
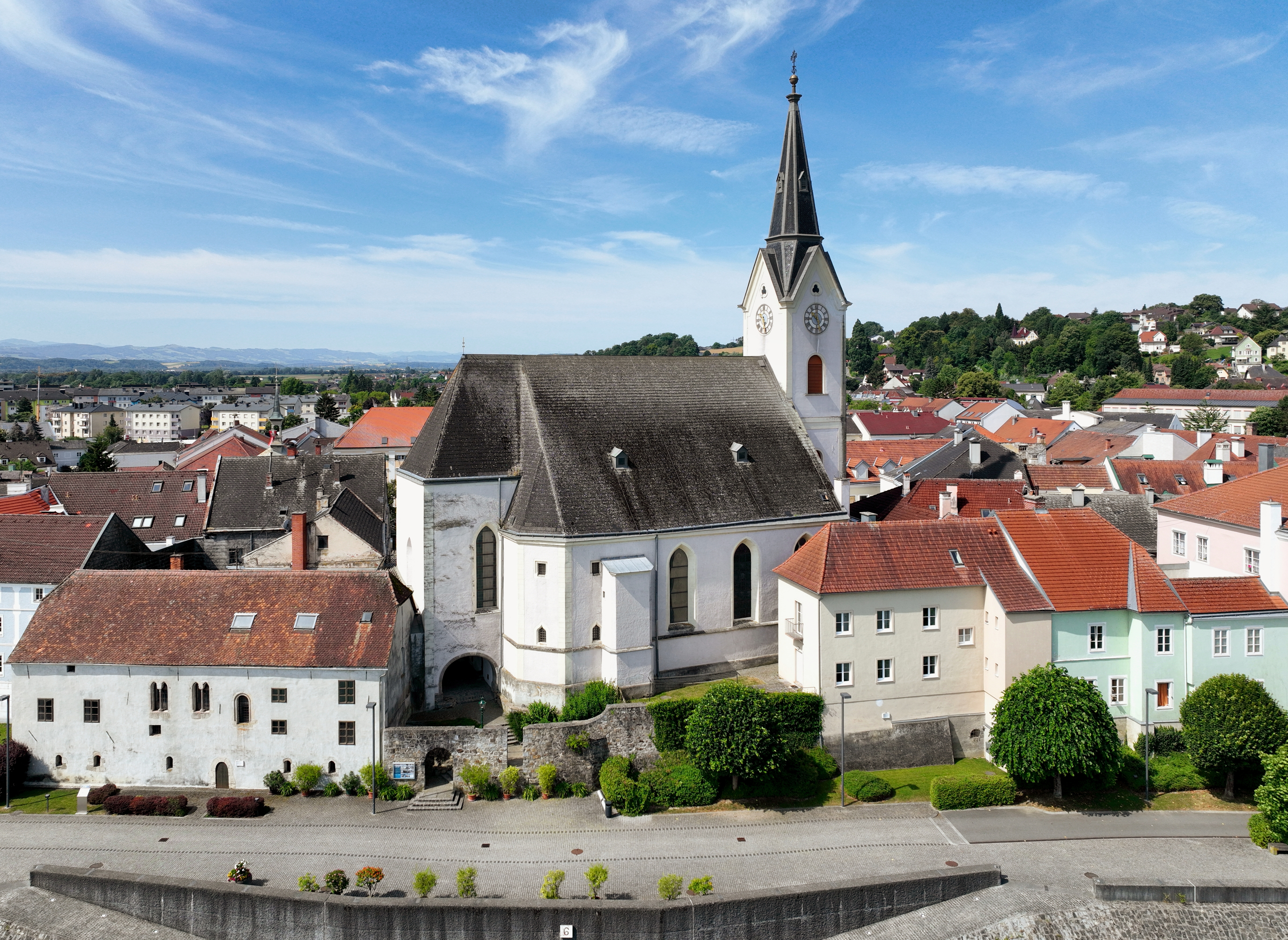
- Church of Saint Lawrence

- Coat of arms

- Location within Austria
- Coordinates: 48°10′00″N 15°04′00″E
- Country: Austria
- State: Lower Austria
- District: Melk

Government
  - Mayor: Ulrike Schachner (SPÖ)

Area
  - Total: 23.82 km^{2} (9.20 sq mi)
- Elevation: 224 m (735 ft)

Population (2018-01-01)
  - Total: 5,653
  - Density: 237.3/km^{2} (614.7/sq mi)
- Time zone: UTC+1 (CET)
  - Summer (DST): UTC+2 (CEST)
- Postal code: 3370
- Area code: 07412
- Vehicle registration: ME
- Website: www.ybbs.at

Ybbs an der Donau (German pronunciation: [ˈɪps ʔan deːɐ̯ ˈdoːnaʊ], lit. 'Ybbs on the Donau'; short: Ybbs; Central Bavarian: Ybbs aun da Donau) is a town in Austria. It was established in 1317. Throughout the town, from the intersection of the important trade routes and along the Danube the town has preserved a site that already had great economic importance during the Middle Ages.

== Toponymy ==
The valley of the Ybbs river is called: Ybbs Valley, or Ybbs Field (German: Ybbsfeld).

== History ==
In 788, Ybbs Field (German: Ybbsfeld) was the site of a battle, between Franks and Avars.

Railroad bridge was dive-bombed by 14th FG on 26 March 1945 at 1020 hrs; Direct hit on abutments, south approach cut, main line blocked.

== Coat of arms ==
On a silver shield lies a red city wall with battlements that an open gate and raised portcullis, which are dominated by two towers. Between the towers floats a green Linden bough, and the red-white-red Bindenschild.

Colors: Red-White-Red Coat of Arms Bestowal: unknown; at least since the 14th century.

== International relations ==
=== Twin towns — Sister cities ===
Ybbs an der Donau is twinned with:

- Bobbio, Italy

== Business and Infrastructure ==
- In northwestern Ybbs is the Ybbs-Persenbeug Power Station, the first river-water-run power plant on the Austrian Danube. WIlly Höhn, a Coburg native came from Stettin. In 1939, he insisted that one of his special constructions was implemented.
- Between November 11, 1907, and September 22, 1953, Ybbs was on the Ybbser Highway, maybe the shortest tramway line in the world. It was 2.94 km long and connected the town with the Westbahn train station in Ybbs-Kemmelbach.

== See also ==
- List of cities and towns in Austria
- Ybbs Valley Railway

== Notes ==
- The information in this article is based on and/or translated from its German equivalent.

== Sources ==
- Pohl, Walter (2018). The Avars: A Steppe Empire in Central Europe, 567-822. Ithaca and London: Cornell University Press. ISBN 9781501729409.
