= Asian Team Chess Championship =

International team chess tournament

The Asian Team Chess Championship (recently also called the Asian Nations Chess Cup) is an international team chess tournament open to national federations affiliated to FIDE in Asia and Oceania. It is organized by the Asian Chess Federation, and the winner qualifies to participate at the next World Team Chess Championship. The open championship has been held at intervals of anywhere from one to four years since 1974. The Asian Women's Team Chess Championship has been held concurrently with the open championship since 1995. Recent editions have additionally featured side team events held at rapid and blitz time controls.

The current Asian champion is Iran, which won in 2018 on home soil at Hamadan. Of the twenty editions of the open championship, China has won eight times, the Philippines has won six times, India has won three times, and Iran, Kazakhstan, and Uzbekistan have each won once. The defending champion of the women's tournament is China, which has won eight of the ten women's championships played; Vietnam won the other two.

== Competition ==
Each member federation located in FIDE Zones 3.1 to 3.7 is entitled to enter a national team of four players and an optional reserve player into the open or women's tournament. The hosting nation is allowed to field two teams, and may field a third team if it results in an even number of participating teams. Currently, matches in both the open and women's tournament are contested on four boards; the women's tournament had been contested on three boards from 1995 to 2008. Since 2008, the final standings in the tournament have been determined by the number of match points scored by each team; before 2008, scores were calculated based on board points. Various formats have been used for both the open and women's championships, with a round robin or Swiss-system tournament being the most common.

== Results ==
=== Open championship ===
Year	Location	Gold	Silver	Bronze	Format	No. of teams
1974	(Malaysia) Penang	Philippines; Rodolfo Tan Cardoso; Glenn Bordonada; Roger Abella; César Caturla; Rico Mascariñas; Jesús Rafael Maninang	Australia; Max Fuller; Michael Woodhams; Arthur Pope; William Jordan; Phillip Viner	Indonesia; Arovah Bachtiar; Jacobus Sawandar Sampouw; Max Arie Wotulo; Monang Simulingga; Abir Dipo	Single round-robin	8
1977	(New Zealand) Auckland	Philippines; Eugene Torre; Rico Mascariñas; Glenn Bordonada; Jesús Rafael Maninang; Luis Chiong	China; Qi Jingxuan; Chen De; Chang Tung Lo; Hsu Hung Hsun; Li Chung Tsien	Indonesia; Salor Sitanggang; Ardiansyah; Jacobus Sawandar Sampouw; Eddy Suwandhio; Herman Kusnadi; Bing Sarjono	Single round-robin	10
1979	Singapore	Philippines; Eugene Torre; Rico Mascariñas; Ruben Rodríguez; Glenn Bordonada; Jesús Rafael Maninang; Andrónico Yap	China; Qi Jingxuan; Liu Wenzhe; Li Zunian; Liang Jinrong; Chen De	Indonesia; Edhi Handoko; Sutan Aritonang; Ronny Gunawan; Ardiansyah; Arovah Bachtiar	Preliminary and final group round-robins	16
1981	(China) Hangzhou	Philippines; Eugene Torre; Rosendo Balinas Jr. Rico Mascariñas; Jesús Rafael Maninang; Ruben Rodríguez; Andrónico Yap	China; Liu Wenzhe; Qi Jingxuan; Liang Jinrong; Li Zunian; Ye Jiangchuan; Chen De	Australia; Ian Rogers; Darryl Johansen; William Jordan; Phillip Viner; Chris Depasquale	Preliminary and final group round-robins	12
1983	(India) New Delhi	China; Qi Jingxuan; Li Zunian; Ye Jiangchuan; Liang Jinrong; Xu Jun; Wang Li	Philippines; Eugene Torre; Rico Mascariñas; Andrónico Yap; Ricardo de Guzman; Ruben Rodríguez; Domingo Ramos	India; Dibyendu Barua; Pravin Thipsay; Pabitra Mohanty; Syed Nasir Ali; Mohamed Rafiq Khan; Neeraj Kumar Mishra	Single round-robin	10
1986	(United Arab Emirates) Dubai	Philippines; Eugene Torre; Andrónico Yap; Rico Mascariñas; Ricardo de Guzman; Chito Garma; Ronald Cusi	India; Vaidyanathan Ravikumar; Arun Vaidya; Ahanthem Meetei; Viswanathan Anand; Devaki Prasad; Balottam Varma	Indonesia; Herman Suradiradja; Dirwan Sinuraya; Tigor Hutagalung; Harry Siregar; Yurlinsyah Ruslan; Sri Sutrisno	Nine-round Swiss	17
1987	Singapore	China; Xu Jun; Ye Jiangchuan; Liang Jinrong; Li Zunian; Lin Ta; Ye Rongguang	Indonesia; Ardiansyah; Ronny Gunawan; Edhi Handoko; Cerdas Barus; Syarif Mahmud; Ruben Gunawan	Singapore; Tan Lian Ann; Alphonsus Chia; Chan Peng Kong; Derrick Heng; Wong Meng Kong; Winston Williams	Nine-round Swiss	14
1989	(Malaysia) Genting Highlands	China; Ye Jiangchuan; Xu Jun; Liang Jinrong; Ye Rongguang; Wang Zili; Chen De	Indonesia; Utut Adianto; Ardiansyah; Ronny Gunawan; Nasib Ginting; Edhi Handoko	India; Viswanathan Anand; Pravin Thipsay; Lanka Ravi; Raja Ravi Sekhar; Dibyendu Barua; N. Sudhakar Babu	Nine-round Swiss	16
1991	(Malaysia) Penang	China; Xu Jun; Ye Rongguang; Liang Jinrong; Wang Zili; Wu Shaobin; Liu Wenzhe	Philippines; Rogelio Antonio Jr. Rico Mascariñas; Rogelio Barcenilla; Ruben Rodríguez; Enrico Sevillano	Indonesia; Utut Adianto; Edhi Handoko; Nasib Ginting; Salor Sitanggang; Hamdani Rudin; Hendrik Poha	Nine-round Swiss	18
1993	(Malaysia) Kuala Lumpur	Kazakhstan; Yevgeniy Vladimirov; Serik Temirbaev; Yakov Nesterov; Vladislav Tkachiev; Vladimir Seredenko; Bolat Asanov	Uzbekistan; Alexander Nenashev; Sergey Zagrebelny; Tahir Vakhidov; Saidali Iuldachev; Sergei Nadyrkhanov; Dmitry Kaiumov	Philippines; Eugene Torre; Rogelio Antonio Jr. Rogelio Barcenilla; Rico Mascariñas; Ruben Rodríguez; Enrico Sevillano	Nine-round Swiss	19
1995	Singapore	Philippines; Rogelio Antonio Jr. Nelson Mariano II; Rogelio Barcenilla; Ricardo de Guzman; Barlo Nadera; Rolando Nolte	China; Xu Jun; Wang Zili; Peng Xiaomin; Liang Jinrong; Lin Weiguo; Zhang Zhong	Uzbekistan; Alexander Nenashev; Sergey Zagrebelny; Mihail Saltaev; Shukhrat Safin; Saidali Iuldachev; Dmitry Kaiumov	Nine-round Swiss	20
1999	(China) Shenyang	Uzbekistan; Alexander Nenashev; Rustam Kasimdzhanov; Saidali Iuldachev; Tahir Vakhidov; Marat Dzhumaev; Dmitry Kaiumov	Kazakhstan; Yevgeniy Vladimirov; Pavel Kotsur; Murtas Kazhgaleyev; Ruslan Irzhanov; Serik Temirbaev	India; Krishnan Sasikiran; Pravin Thipsay; Abhijit Kunte; Devaki Rasad; G. B. Prakash	Nine-round Swiss	16
2003	(India) Jodhpur	China; Ye Jiangchuan; Zhang Zhong; Xu Jun; Zhang Pengxiang; Yu Shaoteng	India 1 Krishnan Sasikiran; Surya Shekhar Ganguly; Pentala Harikrishna; Dibyendu Barua; Abhijit Kunte	India 3 Neelotpal Das; Sriram Jha; Lanka Ravi; Kumar Sharma Dinesh; Bandyopadhyay Roktim	Nine-round Swiss	13
2005	(Iran) Esfahan	India; Krishnan Sasikiran; Abhijit Kunte; Surya Shekhar Ganguly; Kidambi Sundararajan; Sandipan Chanda	Vietnam; Đào Thiên Hải; Nguyễn Anh Dũng; Nguyễn Ngọc Trường Sơn; Lê Quang Liêm; Từ Hoàng Thông	Iran; Ehsan Ghaem Maghami; Elshan Moradi; Morteza Mahjoub; Morteza Darban; Mehdi Khaghani	Double round-robin	6
2008	(India) Visakhapatnam	China; Wang Yue; Bu Xiangzhi; Wang Hao; Zhao Jun; Zhou Jianchao	India; Krishnan Sasikiran; Surya Shekhar Ganguly; Abhijit Kunte; Geetha Narayanan Gopal; Abhijeet Gupta	Vietnam; Nguyễn Ngọc Trường Sơn; Lê Quang Liêm; Nguyễn Anh Dũng; Đào Thiên Hải; Nguyễn Minh Thắng	Single round-robin	8
2009	(India) Kolkata	India; Pentala Harikrishna; Krishnan Sasikiran; Surya Shekhar Ganguly; Parimarjan Negi; J. Deepan Chakkravarthy	Vietnam; Lê Quang Liêm; Nguyễn Ngọc Trường Sơn; Bùi Vinh; Đào Thiên Hải; Nguyễn Anh Dũng	Iran; Ehsan Ghaem Maghami; Elshan Moradi; Morteza Mahjoub; Amir Bagheri; Homayoon Toufighi	Seven-round Swiss	10
2012	(China) Zaozhuang	China; Wang Hao; Wang Yue; Li Chao; Ding Liren; Yu Yangyi	India; Krishnan Sasikiran; Pentala Harikrishna; Parimarjan Negi; Abhijeet Gupta; Geetha Narayanan Gopal	Vietnam; Lê Quang Liêm; Nguyễn Ngọc Trường Sơn; Nguyễn Đức Hòa; Nguyễn Văn Huy; Đào Thiên Hải	Nine-round Swiss	14
2014	(Iran) Tabriz	China; Ding Liren; Yu Yangyi; Wei Yi; Ma Qun; Xiu Deshun	India; S. P. Sethuraman; Baskaran Adhiban; Krishnan Sasikiran; Parimarjan Negi; M. R. Lalith Babu	Vietnam; Lê Quang Liêm; Nguyễn Ngọc Trường Sơn; Nguyễn Đức Hòa; Nguyễn Huỳnh Minh Huy; Đào Thiên Hải	Single round-robin	10
2016	(United Arab Emirates) Abu Dhabi	India; Baskaran Adhiban; S. P. Sethuraman; Vidit Gujrathi; Krishnan Sasikiran; Deep Sengupta	China; Bu Xiangzhi; Wang Yue; Wei Yi; Lu Shanglei; Zhou Jianchao	Kazakhstan; Rinat Jumabayev; Anuar Ismagambetov; Murtas Kazhgaleyev; Rustam Khusnutdinov; Petr Kostenko	Nine-round Swiss	22
2018	(Iran) Hamadan	Iran; Parham Maghsoodloo; Pouya Idani; Amin Tabatabaei; Alireza Firouzja; Masoud Mosadeghpour	India; Baskaran Adhiban; S. P. Sethuraman; Krishnan Sasikiran; Surya Shekhar Ganguly; Abhijeet Gupta	China; Lu Shanglei; Wen Yang; Zhou Jianchao; Bai Jinshi; Xu Xiangyu	Seven-round Swiss	14

=== Women's championship ===
Year	Location	Gold	Silver	Bronze	Format	No. of teams
1995	Singapore	China; Xie Jun; Zhu Chen; Qin Kanying; Xu Yuhua	Vietnam; Hoang Thanh Trang; Mai Thị Thanh Hương; Nguyễn Thị Tường Vân; Nguyễn Thị Thuận Hóa	Kazakhstan; Elvira Sakhatova; Fliura Uskova; Tamara Klink	Nine-round Swiss	12
1999	(China) Shenyang	China 1 Wang Lei; Wang Pin; Xu Yuhua; Qin Kanying	China 2 Zhao Xue; Li Ruofan; Wang Yu; Pan Qian	India; Bhagyashree Thipsay; Subbaraman Vijayalakshmi; Swati Ghate; Shahnaz Safira	Single round-robin	6
2003	(India) Jodhpur	China; Zhu Chen; Xu Yuhua; Wang Yu; Huang Qian	Vietnam; Hoang Thanh Trang; Nguyễn Thị Thanh An; Lê Kiều Thiên Kim; Võ Hồng Phượng	India; Subbaraman Vijayalakshmi; Nisha Mohota; Aarthie Ramaswamy; Harika Dronavalli	Nine-round Swiss	12
2005	(Iran) Esfahan	Vietnam; Nguyễn Thị Thanh An; Lê Thanh Tú; Lương Minh Huệ; Hoàng Thị Bảo Trâm	India; Nisha Mohota; Mary Ann Gomes; Swati Ghate; Anupama Gokhale	Iran 2 Shirin Navabi; Mahini Mona Salman; Mitra Hejazipour; Ghazal Hakimifard	Double round-robin	4
2008	(India) Visakhapatnam	China; Zhao Xue; Huang Qian; Shen Yang	India; Harika Dronavalli; Nisha Mohota; Tania Sachdev; Aarthie Ramaswamy	Vietnam; Lê Thanh Tú; Nguyễn Thị Thanh An; Lê Kiều Thiên Kim; Hoàng Thị Bảo Trâm	Single round-robin	8
2009	(India) Kolkata	Vietnam; Lê Thanh Tú; Phạm Lê Thảo Nguyên; Nguyễn Thị Thanh An; Nguyễn Thị Mai Hưng; Hoàng Thị Như Ý	India; Harika Dronavalli; Eesha Karavade; Tania Sachdev; Soumya Swaminathan; Nadig Krutika	Iran; Atousa Pourkashiyan; Shadi Paridar; Shayesteh Ghaderpour; Mitra Hejazipour; Sarasadat Khademalsharieh	Seven-round Swiss	9
2012	(China) Zaozhuang	China; Zhao Xue; Ju Wenjun; Shen Yang; Huang Qian; Ding Yixin	India; Harika Dronavalli; Eesha Karavade; Tania Sachdev; Mary Ann Gomes; Padmini Rout	Vietnam; Phạm Lê Thảo Nguyên; Nguyễn Thị Thanh An; Phạm Bích Ngọc; Nguyễn Thị Mai Hưng; Hoàng Thị Như Ý	Single round-robin	10
2014	(Iran) Tabriz	China; Ju Wenjun; Huang Qian; Tan Zhongyi; Shen Yang; Guo Qi	India; Harika Dronavalli; Tania Sachdev; Eesha Karavade; Mary Ann Gomes; Padmini Rout	Iran; Atousa Pourkashiyan; Sarasadat Khademalsharieh; Mitra Hejazipour; Ghazal Hakimifard; Shayesteh Ghaderpour	Single round-robin	6
2016	(United Arab Emirates) Abu Dhabi	China; Ju Wenjun; Zhao Xue; Tan Zhongyi; Lei Tingjie; Guo Qi	Uzbekistan; Nafisa Muminova; Sarvinoz Kurbonboeva; Irina Gevorgian; Gulrukhbegim Tokhirjonova; Sevara Baymuradova	Kazakhstan; Dinara Saduakassova; Zhansaya Abdumalik; Madina Davletbayeva; Gulmira Dauletova; Sholpan Zhylkaidarova	Single round-robin	10
2018	(Iran) Hamadan	China; Lei Tingjie; Shen Yang; Wang Jue; Guo Qi; Zhai Mo	Vietnam; Hoàng Thị Bảo Trâm; Phạm Lê Thảo Nguyên; Nguyễn Thị Thanh An; Nguyễn Thị Mai Hưng; Lương Phương Hạnh	India; Harika Dronavalli; Vaishali Rameshbabu; Eesha Karavade; Padmini Rout; Aakanksha Hagawane	Single round-robin	8

== Medal table ==
=== Open table ===
Rank	Nation	Gold	Silver	Bronze	Total
1	China	8	5	1	14
2	Philippines	6	2	1	9
3	India	3	6	4	13
4	Kazakhstan	1	1	1	3
4	Uzbekistan	1	1	1	3
6	Iran	1	0	2	3
7	Indonesia	0	2	5	7
8	Vietnam	0	2	3	5
9	Australia	0	1	1	2
10	Singapore	0	0	1	1
Totals (10 entries)		20	20	20	60

=== Women's table ===
Rank	Nation	Gold	Silver	Bronze	Total
1	China	8	1	0	9
2	Vietnam	2	3	2	7
3	India	0	5	3	8
4	Uzbekistan	0	1	0	1
5	Iran	0	0	3	3
6	Kazakhstan	0	0	2	2
Totals (6 entries)		10	10	10	30

== Other Asian team tournaments ==
Team chess events are currently part of the program of the Asian Indoor and Martial Arts Games, and have sometimes been part of the Southeast Asian Games, most recently in 2013. The 2006 and 2010 Asian Games also featured team chess events, as did the Pan Arab Games from 1999 to 2011.

An Asian Cities Chess Championship has been held roughly once every two years since 1979.

An Asian Nations Online Chess Cup was held in 2020 during the COVID-19 pandemic, which was won by Australia in the open section and India in the women's section.

== See also ==
- Chess Olympiad
- Chess at the African Games
- Pan American Team Chess Championship
- European Team Chess Championship
