= Rico Mascariñas =

Filipino chess player (born 1953)

Personal information
- Born: 2 March 1953 (age 73) Cebu City, Philippines

Chess career
- Country: Philippines
- Title: International Master (1978)
- Peak rating: 2437 (January 2001)

Rico Mascariñas (born 2 March 1953) is a Filipino chess player with the title of International Master. He was one of the premiere chess players of the Philippines during the 1980s and the 1990s and for a long period of time he was the No. 2 ranked player of the Philippines behind Grandmaster Eugenio Torre.

Per World Chess Federation (FIDE), his highest numerical Elo rating was 2437 which he reached in January 2001 up to July 2001. At present, he has a numerical Elo rating of 2416 with a World Rank of No. 1800 and a National Rank (among Filipino chess players) of No. 16. However, per chessgames.com, Mascariñas achieved a highest numerical Elo rating of 2470. He was awarded the International Master (IM) title in 1978.

He is now based in Singapore where he coaches the junior team.

In 2004 Mascariñas was awarded the title of FIDE Instructor.

== Chess career ==
At the 1st Burroughs Computers Grandmasters Tournament held from April 5–19, 1978 at New Zealand, Mascariñas tied for third place with a score of 7/12 posting 4 wins, 6 draws and 2 losses just behind tournament winner Miguel Quinteros (10/12) and countryman Eugene Torre (8/12) and tied with Ortvin Sarapu. This tournament served as the second leg of the Asian Grandmasters Circuit.

Mascariñas also played at the 29th (2001) Annual World Open held in Philadelphia, USA, a 9-round Swiss System event featuring 228 players. Mascariñas ended up tied for 96th–118th places where he eventually finished in 101st place with a score of 4.5/9 by posting 4 wins, 1 draw and 4 losses.

Mascariñas, who migrated to Singapore later in his career, played at the 21st Cairnhill Open which took place from December 7–13, 2003 in Cairnhill CC, Singapore. He tied for 5th-11th places with a score of 6.5/9 in this 73-player, 9-round Swiss System Tournament finishing in 7th place after tiebreaks where countryman GM Julio Sadorra also played and ended up also in this 5th-11th logjam eventually placing 10th.

=== FIDE World Chess Championship ===
- Mascariñas played at the 1990 Manila Interzonal where 64 players participated in this Swiss-format tournament of 13 rounds played from 29 June to 14 July at the Ninoy Aquino Stadium. Aside from Mascariñas, the home country was represented also by GM Torre. Both Mascariñas and Torre did not advance to the Candidates Matches with the latter ending up in a tie for 29th – 39th places with 6.5/13 ultimately ending up in 33rd place and the former ending up in a tie for 54th – 57th places with 5/13 (finished 55th place).
- Mascariñas played at the 2000 Vũng Tàu Zone 3.2 tournament held from May 21–29, 2000 at Vũng Tàu, Vietnam that offered two FIDE World Championship slots. The tournament was a 9-round Swiss System event with 32 players. Mascariñas finished in a tie for 3rd-8th places where he eventually finished in 3rd place and a bronze medal with a score of 6.0/9.0 just behind joint first placers GM Đào Thiên Hải of Vietnam and GM Buenaventura Villamayor of the Philippines who won gold and silver, respectively. They were the qualifiers from this zonal event.

=== Chess Olympiad ===
He played in eight Chess Olympiads (1976, 1978, 1980, 1982, 1984, 1988, 1990, 1992) garnering a total score of 46.5 points/82 games on the strength of 26 wins, 41 draws and 15 losses. He played Board 2 for Team Philippines from 1980–1984 and 1988 and Board 3 in 1978 and 1990 and Board 4 in 1976 as an untitled player. In the 1992 Chess Olympiad played at Manila, Philippines, he spearheaded Team Philippines "B" which tied for 38th – 44th places.

His greatest moment in the history of the Chess Olympiad came at the 1982 Lucerne Olympiad where he bagged the gold medal in Board 2 going undefeated in 9 games, winning 6 and drawing 3 for a total of 7.5 points. He had a performance rating of 2615 in this Olympiad as compared to his 2410 ELO Rating at that time.

In 1988 at the 28th Chess Olympiad held at Thessaloniki, Greece, he was part of Team Philippines that recorded a best-ever 7th-place finish manning Board 2. He scored 7.5 points in 13 games on the strength of 4 wins, 7 draws and 2 losses with a performance rating of 2531, way above his ELO rating then of 2455.

=== Asian Chess Championships ===
He also participated in eight Asian Chess Championship (1974, 1977, 1979, 1981, 1983, 1986, 1991, 1993) manning Board 2 in 1977, 1979, 1983 & 1991, Board 3 in 1981 & 1986, Board 4 in 1993 and 1st Reserve Board in 1974.

- In his debut in the 1974 edition held at Penang, Malaysia, he scored 3.5/4 to bag the gold medal in the 1st Reserve Board with a high performance rating of 2536. In that edition, he was joined by fellow untitled players Cesar Caturla and Jesus Rafael Maninang to win gold medals in Board 4 and 2nd Reserve Board, respectively, where Team Philippines also bagged the gold medal.
- In the 1977 championships played at Auckland, New Zealand, Mascariñas played Board 2 for the first time in his career and immediately made his presence felt as he won the Bronze Medal scoring 6 points in 8 games with a performance rating of 2444 as compared to his ELO at that time of 2345. Team Philippines again won the gold medal in this edition where all 5 Filipino players won medals: Eugene Torre winning Gold in Board 1, Glenn Bordonada also Gold in Board 3, another Gold for Maninang in Board 4 and Bronze for Luis Chiong in the 1st Reserve Board.
- In the 1979 edition, he won all his 7 games en route to winning the gold medal in Board 2 with a very impressive performance rating of 3029 as compared to his 2395 ELO rating at that time where Team Philippines copped the Gold Medal once again.
- In the 1981 edition held at Hangzhou, China, Mascariñas played Board 3 and placed 4th with a score of 4.5/7 registering 3 wins, 3 draws and losing once with a performance rating of 2373 which was a shade below than his 2385 ELO rating. Team Philippines again won the gold medal, its fourth in 4 editions.
- It was back to Board 2 for Mascariñas in the 1983 edition played at New Delhi, India where he placed 5th with a rather mediocre score of 4.5/9 (+3, =3, -3) with a low performance rating of 2258 as compared to his 2425 ELO rating. Team Philippines won the silver medal in this edition.
- In the 1986 edition held at Dubai, he went undefeated in 6 games manning Board 3, winning 5 and drawing 1 to score an outstanding 5.5/6 with a performance rating of 2649 as compared to his ELO rating of 2405 winning the gold medal in the process. It was an overpowering performance by Team Philippines which again won the Gold Medal as 5 of the 6 Filipino players won medals; 4 golds (IM Andronico Yap in Board 2, Chito Garma and Ronald Cusi in the 1st and 2nd Reserve Boards) and 1 silver (IM Ricardo de Guzman in Board 4) with Torre the lone casualty as he placed 6th.
- Finally, in 1991 at Penang, Malaysia, he secured the silver medal in Board 2 scoring 6 points out of a possible 8 (+4, =4, -0) with a performance rating of 2504 (2440 ELO rating) where Team Philippines won the silver medal.
- His last participation at this tournament was in 1993 where he played 2 games in board 4, with 1 draw and 1 loss. The team, though, bagged the bronze medal with the other members of the team performing well to make up for Mascariñas rather poor performance with GM Rogelio Antonio Jr. (Board 2) and IMs Rogelio Barcenilla (Board 3) and Enrico Sevillano (Second Reserve Board) all winning Individual Silver Medals and GM Torre (Board 1) bringing home an individual bronze medal. The last member of the team, IM Rubén Rodríguez placed 7th overall in the First Reserve Board.

Overall, Mascariñas posted an impressive 37.5 points in 51 games posting 30 wins, 15 draws and 6 losses with an overall winning percentage of 73.5% where he won 3 gold medals, 1 silver medal and 1 bronze medal in Individual Play and 5 golds, 2 silvers and 1 bronze in Team Competition.

=== Intchess Vision Masters (Singapore Chess Open) ===
He has been a regular fixture in the Intchess Vision Masters tournament where he has already participated four times: 3rd, 4th, 8th and 10th editions. He won the 4th and 8th editions of the tournament and finished runner-up in the 3rd edition. During its 10th edition, he finished in 6th place where his countryman Eric Gloria finished as Champion.

== Achievements and awards ==
- Gold Medal (1st Reserve Board), 1974 Asian Team Chess Championships, Penang, Malaysia (3.5/4)
- Bronze Medal (Board 2), 1977 Asian Team Chess Championships, Auckland, New Zealand (6.0/8)
- Tie for Third Place, 1978 1st Burroughs Computers Grandmaster Tournament, New Zealand (7/12)
- Gold Medal (Board 2), 1979 Asian Team Chess Championships, Hangzhou, China (7.0/7)
- Gold Medal (Board 2), 1982 Lucerne Chess Olympiad (7.5/9)
- Gold Medal (Board 3), 1986 Asian Chess Championships, Dubai, UAE (5.5/6)
- Silver Medal (Board 2), 1991 Asian Chess Championships, Penang, Malaysia (6.0/8)
- Bronze Medal, 2000 Zone 3.2a Qualifiers Vũng Tàu, Vietnam
- Board 1 Player, Rose Pharmacy, Inc., 2003 Val Ylanan, EEC and Associates Sinulog Chess Team Tournament
- 7th Place, 21st Cairnhill Open (Singapore 2003)
- Runner-up, 2005 Singapore Open Chess Championships (3rd Vision Masters Tournament)
- Champion, 4th Vision Masters Tournament (Singapore 2006)
- Champion, 8th Intchess Vision Masters Tournament (Singapore 2009)
- 6th place, 10th Intchess Vision Masters Tournament (Singapore 2010)
