= Rogelio Antonio Jr. =

Filipino chess grandmaster (born 1962)

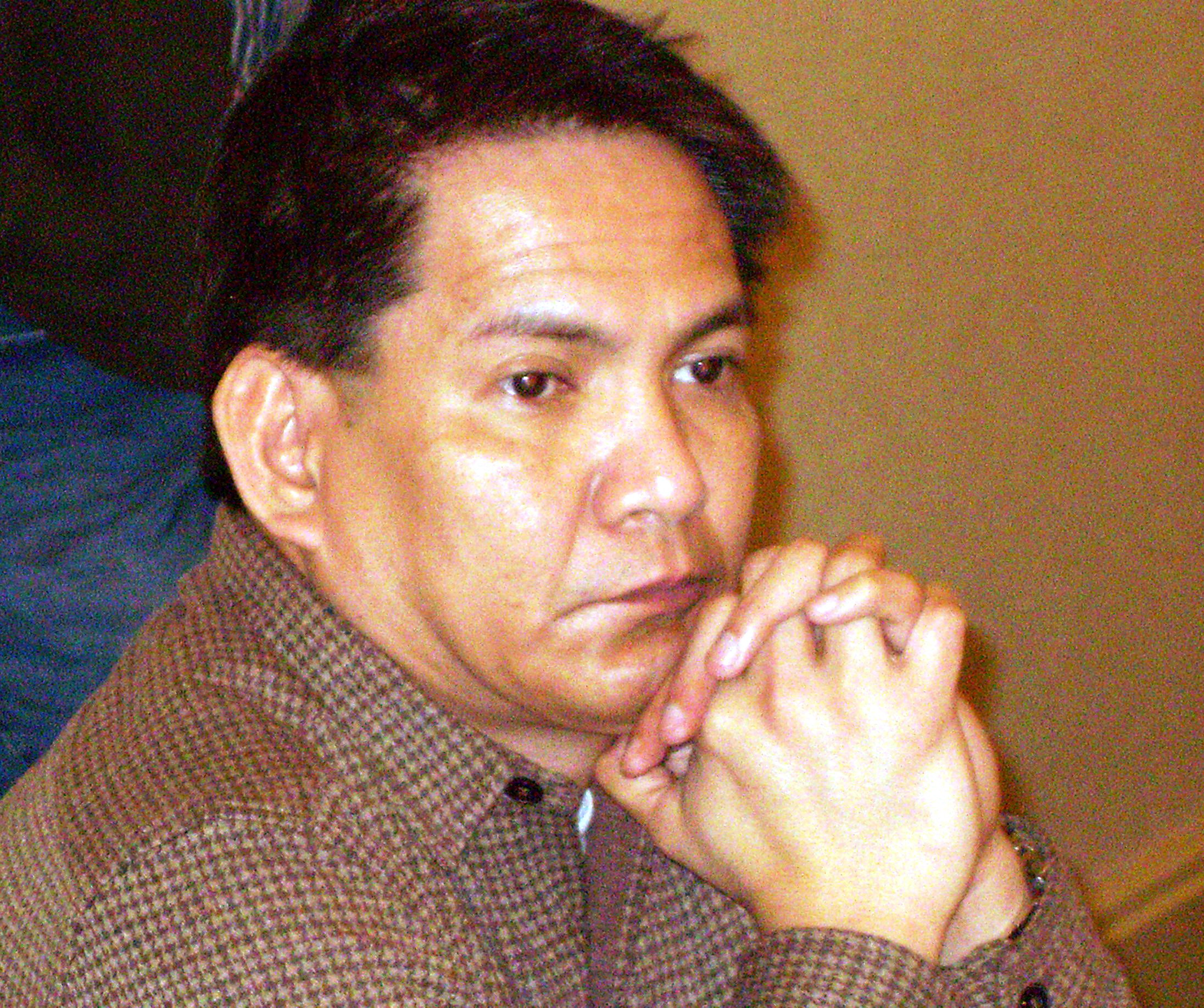
- Rogelio Antonio Jr., 2009

Personal information
- Born: February 19, 1962 (age 64)

Chess career
- Country: Philippines
- Title: Grandmaster (1993)
- Peak rating: 2589 (January 2011)

Rogelio Antonio Jr. (born February 19, 1962) is a Filipino chess grandmaster, who was awarded the title in 1993. He is affectionately known as "Joey" Antonio or GM Joey. Antonio finished tied for 3rd-8th places in the 2009 Asian Chess Championship (ultimately finishing in 6th place after tiebreaks) and became the first player in the Philippines' history to qualify for the World Cup later in 2009.

== Chess career ==
=== FIDE World Chess Championship ===
Antonio participated in two World Chess Championship cycle, in the 1990–1993 cycle and the 1998–1999 cycle:

In the 1990–1993 cycle, he participated in the Zonal 11 tournament held at Shah Alam, Malaysia where he ended up as the best-placed Filipino player tied for 9th-13th places with fellow Filipinos GM Eugene Torre and then IM Rogelio Barcenilla and IM Edhi Handoko and GM Utut Adianto, both of Indonesia. Antonio eventually ended up in 9th place with Handoko ending up 10th, Torre 11th, Barcenilla 12th and Adianto 13th. He was seeded No. 8 in this tournament with an ELO of 2440 and registered 6.0/11 recording 3 wins, 6 draws and 2 losses with a Tournament Performance Rating (TPR) of 2465. However, he did not qualify for the Interzonals as only the top 2 qualified.

In the 1998–1999 cycle, Antonio (2540) tied for 1st-4th places in the Zonal 3.2a held at Yangon in December 1998 with Super GM Adianto (2610), IM Dede Liu (2375) of Indonesia and FM Dashzeveg Sharavdorj (2385) of Mongolia that necessitated a play-off among the 4 players as all 4 scored 6.5/9 with Antonio posting 5 wins, 3 draws and 1 loss with a TPR of 2565 in the 30-player field. In the ensuing playoff, Antonio came out on top with 4.0/6 (+2 =4 -0) as he qualified for the 1999 World Championship held at Las Vegas. As the 63rd-ranked player with an ELO of 2558, he progressed into the Round of 64 as he defeated the 99th-seeded Alexander Kozak (2330) of Russia, 2–0, in the Round of 128. However, he was defeated in the Round of 64 by Armenian Super GM Vladimir Akopian (2640), 2.5-1.5. Their best-of 2 matches ended up tied 1–1 as both games ended in draws that necessitated tiebreaks. After another draw in the first game of the 2-game tiebreaks, Antonio lost the second game as he bowed out of the World Chess Championship.

=== FIDE World Cup ===
Antonio also qualified in the 2009 Chess World Cup held in Khanty-Mansiysk, Russia held from November 20 - December 15, 1999 which is a knock-out format. Antonio earned the berth after finishing tied for 3rd-8th places in the 2009 Asian Chess Championship also known as the Asian Continental Championship, eventually placing 6th. The top 10 finishers in the tournament qualified for the Chess World Cup.

Seeded 102 among 128 players, Antonio (2574) faced 27th-seeded Super GM Gata Kamsky (2695) in the Round of 128. He bowed to Kamsky, 0.5-1.5, after losing the first game and drawing the 2nd game.

=== Chess Olympiad ===
Antonio has played many times for the Philippines Olympiad team, mostly on board 2, behind the Philippines' first GM Torre. Antonio's tally in this arena has never fallen below 50% and in 2000, at Istanbul, he scored 7/10 with a performance rating of 2684. He has already scored a high 74 points out of 117 games on the strength of 48 wins, 52 draws and 17 losses for a winning percentage of 63.2%.

Event	Board	ELO	Record	Winning %	Individual result	Rank	TPR	Team result
Olympiad, Thessaloniki 1988	4th	2325	+6 =5 -2	65.4%	8.5/13	14th+	2544	7th
Olympiad, Novi Sad 1990	2nd	2445	+7 =3 -3	65.4%	8.5/13	14th+	2573	21st
Olympiad, Manila 1992	2nd	2500	+7 =2 -3	66.7%	8.0/12	10th	2499	31st
Olympiad, Moscow 1994	2nd	2490	+4 =6 -2	58.3%	7.0/12	34th	2571	21st
Olympiad, Yerevan 1996	2nd	2530	+4 =5 -4	50.0%	6.5/13	46th	2482	26th
Olympiad, Elista 1998	2nd	2540	+2 =10 -0^	58.3%	7/12	35th	2596	35th
Olympiad, Istanbul 2000	2nd	2548	+6 =2 -2	70.0%	7.0/10	9th+	2684	19th
Olympiad, Bled 2002	2nd	2507	+4 =8 -0^	66.7%	8.0/12	12th	2594	39th
Olympiad, Calvia 2004	2nd	2524	+4 =5 -0^	72.2%	6.5/9	6th+	2613	19th
Olympiad, Turin 2006	3rd	2539	+4 =6 -1	63.6%	7.0/11	27th	2608	44th

+ Team-best Rank

^ Unbeaten tournament

=== Asian Team Chess Championship ===
Event	Board	ELO	Record	Winning %	Individual result	Rank	TPR	Team result
Penang Asian Team Chess Championship (9th) 1991	1st	2495	+3 =6 -0	66.7%	6/9	6th	2492	Silver
Kuala Lumpur Asian Team Chess Championship (10th) 1993	2nd	2485	+4 =3 -1	68.8%	5.5/8	Silver	2512	Bronze
Singapore Asian Team Chess Championship (11th) 1995	1st	2525	+5 =2 -1	75.0%	6.0/8	Gold	2568	Gold
Shenyang Asian Team Chess Championship (12th) 1999	1st	2558	+2 =4 -3	44.4%	4.0/9	(9th)	2443	Fourth

He ended up his stint at the Asian Team Chess Championship with a record of 21.5 points in 34 games in 4 appearances posting 14 wins, 15 draws and 5 losses with a winning percentage of 63.2% winning 2 medals in the individual standings (1 gold and 1 silver) and 3 medals in the team competitions (1 gold, 1 silver and 1 bronze).

=== Asian Cities Chess Championship ===
Event	Board	ELO	Record	Winning %	Individual result	Rank	TPR	Team result
13th Asian Cities Chess Championship Aden 2002	2nd	2519	+4 =3 -2	61.1%	5.5/9	---	2426	Bronze
14th Asian Cities Chess Championship Manila 2004	2nd	2523	+4 =4 -1	66.7%	6.0/9	---	2469	Gold
15th Asian Cities Chess Championship Tehran 2007	2nd	2551	+5 =3 -1	72.2%	6.5/9	Silver	2553	Silver
17th Asian Cities Chess Championship Jakarta 2011	2nd	2589	+6 =2 -1	77.8%	7.0/9	Silver	2585	Fourth
18th Asian Cities Chess Championship Tagaytay 2013	1st	2518	+4 =1 -3	56.3%	4.5/8	---	2473	Fourth

After the 2013 edition, his 5th participation in the tournament, Antonio has already compiled a total of 29.5 points in 44 games winning 23 games, drawing 13 matches and losing 8 games for a 67.0% winning rate. He ended up with 2 silver medals in the individual competitions and 1 gold, 1 silver and 1 bronze in team competitions.

=== Asian Individual Chess Championship ===
Event	ELO Rating (Seed)	Result	Record	Rank	# of Players	TPR
Kolkata Asian Chess Championship (3rd) 2001	2535 (18th)	5.5/11	+4 =3 -4	41st	76	2422
Cebu City Asian Chess Championship (6th) 2007	2532 (19th)	7.0/11	+5 =4 -2	11th	72	2593
Subic Bay Freeport Zone Asian Chess Championship (7th) 2009	2518 (28th)	7.5/11	+5 =5 -1	6th	86	2628
Subic Bay Freeport Zone Asian Chess Championship (8th) 2010	2572 (14th)	5.5/9	+2 =7 -0	21st	90	2514
Ho Chi Minh City Asian Chess Championship (10th) 2012	2557 (13th)	0.5/3	+0 =1 -2	72nd	72	2128
Subic Bay Freeport Zone Asian Chess Championship (11th) 2013	2539 (15th)	4.5/9	+2 =5 -2	47th	77	2355

In six (6) appearances in the Asian Chess Championship, Antonio has already recorded 30.5 points in 54 games registering 18 wins, 25 draws and 11 losses for a 56.5 winning percentage.

=== Asian Games ===
Antonio (2573) was also part of the silver medal-winning Philippine Team to the 16th Asian Games held in Guangzhou, China where they stunned the highly rated all-Super GM Indian team led by GMs Krishnan Sasikiran (2688) and Pentala Harikrishna (2657) in the semifinals, 2.5-1.5, to advance to the gold medal game versus China. He manned Board 2 where he played a total of 7 games, going undefeated with 5 points posting 3 wins and 4 draws for a 71.4% winning rate that included his great win against Sasikiran in the semifinals. He was the team's top scorer and had a very high TPR of 2730.

=== Asian Indoor Games ===
Antonio (2557) was also part of the Philippine Team that participated in the 3rd Asian Indoor Chess Games held at Hanoi, China in 2009 where he played Board 1. After nine (9) rounds of preliminaries, the team placed 7th among 15 teams and failed to advance to the cross-over semifinals. Antonio played all 8 games (the team had a bye in the 7th round) and scored 5 points (+4 =2 -2) for a winning rate of 62.5% although he had a rather low 2495 TPR and was the team's 2nd-leading scorer behind GM Mark Paragua (Board 2).

=== Other notable tournaments ===
Some of Antonio's best results include 3rd at the Manapla, Negros Occidental event in 2001, tied for 2nd-4th at the 15th Leuven Open 2003 and 2nd at the Malaysian Open of 2005. Also in 2005, he took a bronze medal at the blitz event of the South East Asian (SEA) Games and a board one gold medal at the National Open Team Championship for club side Tagaytay, with a score of 6/7.

At the 15th (2003) Leuven Open held from November 7–11, 2003 in Belgium and attracted 112 participants, Antonio (2522) ended up tied for 2nd-4th places with Super GM Vladimir Epishin of Russia and fellow GM Buenaventura Villamayor all with 7.0/9, 1 point behind sole winner GM Torre who scored 8.0/9. Antonio eventually ended up in 3rd place after the Buchholz tiebreaks losing out to Epishin, 56–52, but ahead of Villamayor (51.5). He had a TPR of 2529.

In 2013, Antonio proved that he is still a force to reckon with in chess as he won the 2013 National Rapid Chess Championship held at the Philippine Sports Commission (PSC) National Athletes' Dining Hall, Rizal Memorial Sports Complex, Vito Cruz, Manila. He finished the 9-round Open Division with 7.5 points ahead of fellow GM Richard Bitoon of Cebu and NM Jerad Docena of Bohol who both ended up with 7.0 points.

On July 25, 2020, Antonio ruled the Baby Uno Chess Challenge dubbed as the Police Colonel Jaime Osit Santos Chess Championship where he scored 10.5/12 scoring 10 wins, 1 draw and 1 loss in this 12-round Swiss System tournament organized by the Bayanihan Chess Club headed by AGM/NM Almario Marlon Bernardino and Genghis Katipunan Memorial. He finished 2.5 point clear of joint second placers FM Jesse Noel Salas, NM Julius Sinangote and US Master Jose Aquino Jr. who all ended up with 8.0 points.

=== 2008 US Tournaments ===
In 2008, Antonio won seven straight US tournaments: (1) 2008 Super Blitz Open Chess Championships, (2) the 2008 Motor City Open, (3) the 17th North American FIDE Invitational, (4) the 2008 Los Angeles Open, (5) the 8th Universal Annual Swiss Chess Open, (6) the G/19 and the (7) 10th Annual Joseph Ileto Memorial Open Chess Championships.

=== Seniors Chess Championship ===
On November 18, 2017, Antonio placed second in the 27th World Senior Chess Championship 2017 held in Acqui Terme, Italy, in the Open 50+ category behind winner GM Julio Granda Zuniga of Peru. He won his final round match against Italian IM Spartaco Sarno in 51 moves of a Caro-Kann defense to finish with 8.5 points in a tie with French GM Eric Prie. Antonio claimed 2nd place by virtue of a better quotient, 73–71.5. He also captured 3rd place in the blitz section with 7.0 points behind winner IM Alexander Reprintsev of Ukraine (8.5) and German Rolf Fritsch (8.0).

On July 21, 2020, Antonio won the 2020 Asian Seniors Chess Championship by scoring 7.5/9 ahead of Uzbek GMs Tair Vahidov, 2nd with 6.5/9, and Alexei Barsov, 3rd with 6.0/9. Fellow Filipino IM Ricardo de Guzman led a group of 5.5 pointers. Antonio was undefeated in the tournament registering 6 wins, including a big win against Vahidov in the 3rd round, and 3 draws, one of which was against Barsov in the 7th round.

=== Online Prolificness ===
Antonio has garnered attention for the amount of time he has devoted to playing online on chess.com with his username GMJoey1, having logged what is estimated to be over a year in total playing time since his account was created in December 2009 and regularly playing 100 to 200 games a day.
