= Jan Hein Donner =

Dutch chess grandmaster (1927–1988)

Hein Donner
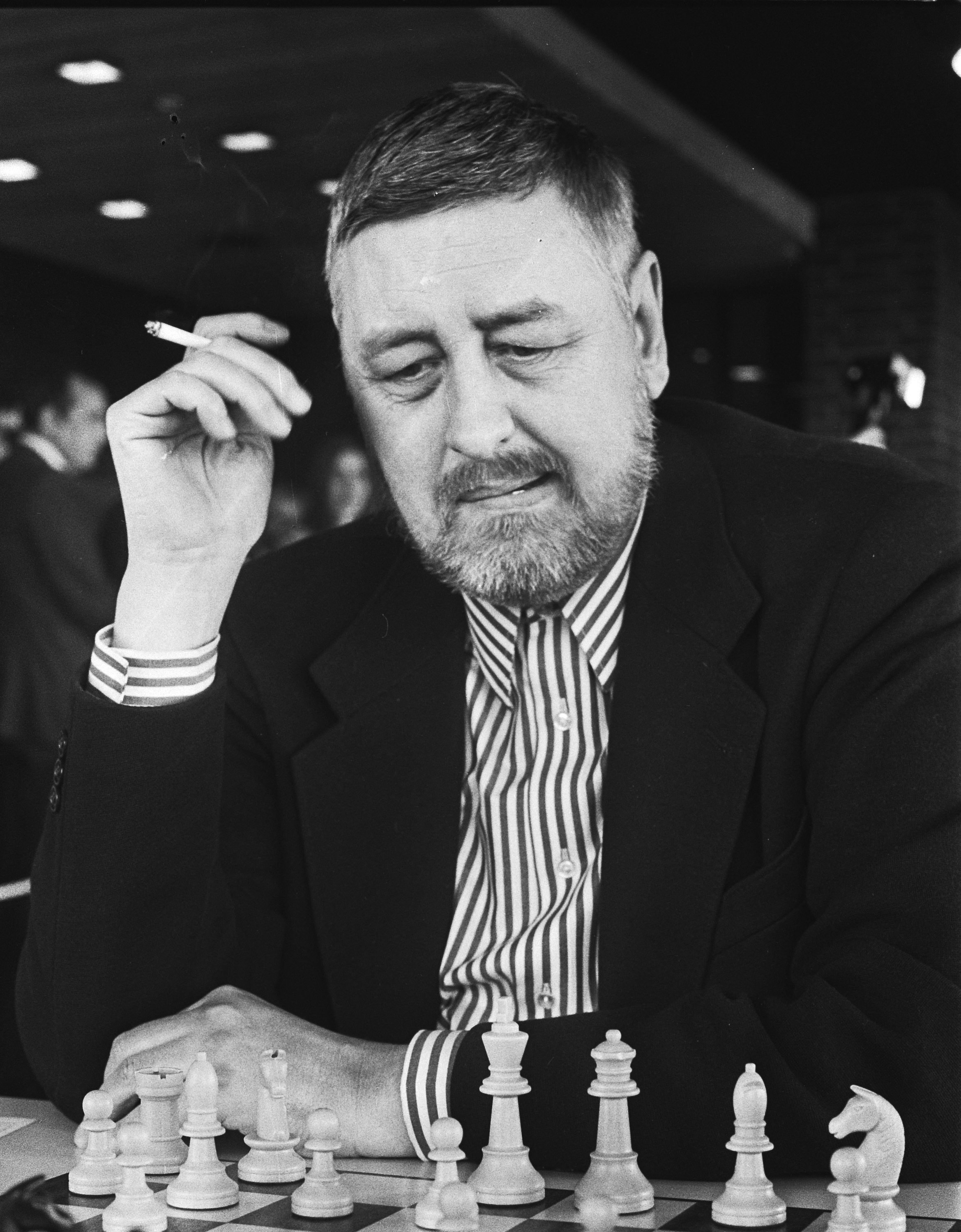
- Donner in 1978

Personal information
- Born: Johannes Hendrikus Donner; July 6, 1927 The Hague, Netherlands
- Died: November 27, 1988 (aged 61)

Chess career
- Country: Netherlands
- Title: Grandmaster (1959)
- Peak rating: 2500 (July 1971)
- Peak ranking: No. 77 (July 1971)

Johannes Hendrikus (Hein) Donner (July 6, 1927 – November 27, 1988) was a Dutch chess grandmaster and writer. He was born in The Hague. His father Jan Donner was a prominent Dutch politician and judge. Donner won the Dutch Championship in 1954, 1957, and 1958. At the Gijón tournament of 1956 he came third, behind Bent Larsen and Klaus Darga, equal with Alberic O'Kelly. FIDE, the World Chess Federation, awarded Donner the GM title in 1959. He played for the Netherlands in the Chess Olympiads 11 times (1950–1954, 1958–1962, 1968, 1972–1978). He was the uncle of a former Dutch Minister of Social Affairs and Employment, Piet Hein Donner.

On August 24, 1983, Donner suffered a stroke, which he wrote happened "just in time, because when you are 56 you do not play chess as well as you did when you were 26". After surviving the stroke, he went to live in Vreugdehof, which he described as "a kind of nursing-home". He was unable to walk, but had learned to type with one finger, and wrote for NRC Handelsblad and Schaaknieuws.

The character Onno Quist in the novel (and film) The Discovery of Heaven by Harry Mulisch is based on Donner.

== The columnist ==
Donner was also a chess columnist and writer. He was famous for his outspoken and often outrageous columns about subjects such as women, politics, and fellow Dutch grandmaster Lodewijk Prins, whom Donner claimed "cannot tell a knight from a bishop".

In 1987, the book De Koning ("The King") was published, which contained 162 of his chess columns, all but the last written between 1950 and 1983, collected by Tim Krabbé and Max Pam. Also in 1987, Donner received the Henriёtte Roland-Holst Prize, one of the Netherlands' most prestigious literary awards, for Na mijn dood geschreven ("Written after my death"), a selection from the mini-columns he had written for NRC Handelsblad. On November 27, 1988, Donner died of a gastric hemorrhage. He is buried at Zorgvlied cemetery.

In 2006, New in Chess published an English translation of the complete De Koning, entitled The King: Chess Pieces. An abridged edition had previously appeared in English in the 1990s.

== Quotes from Donner ==
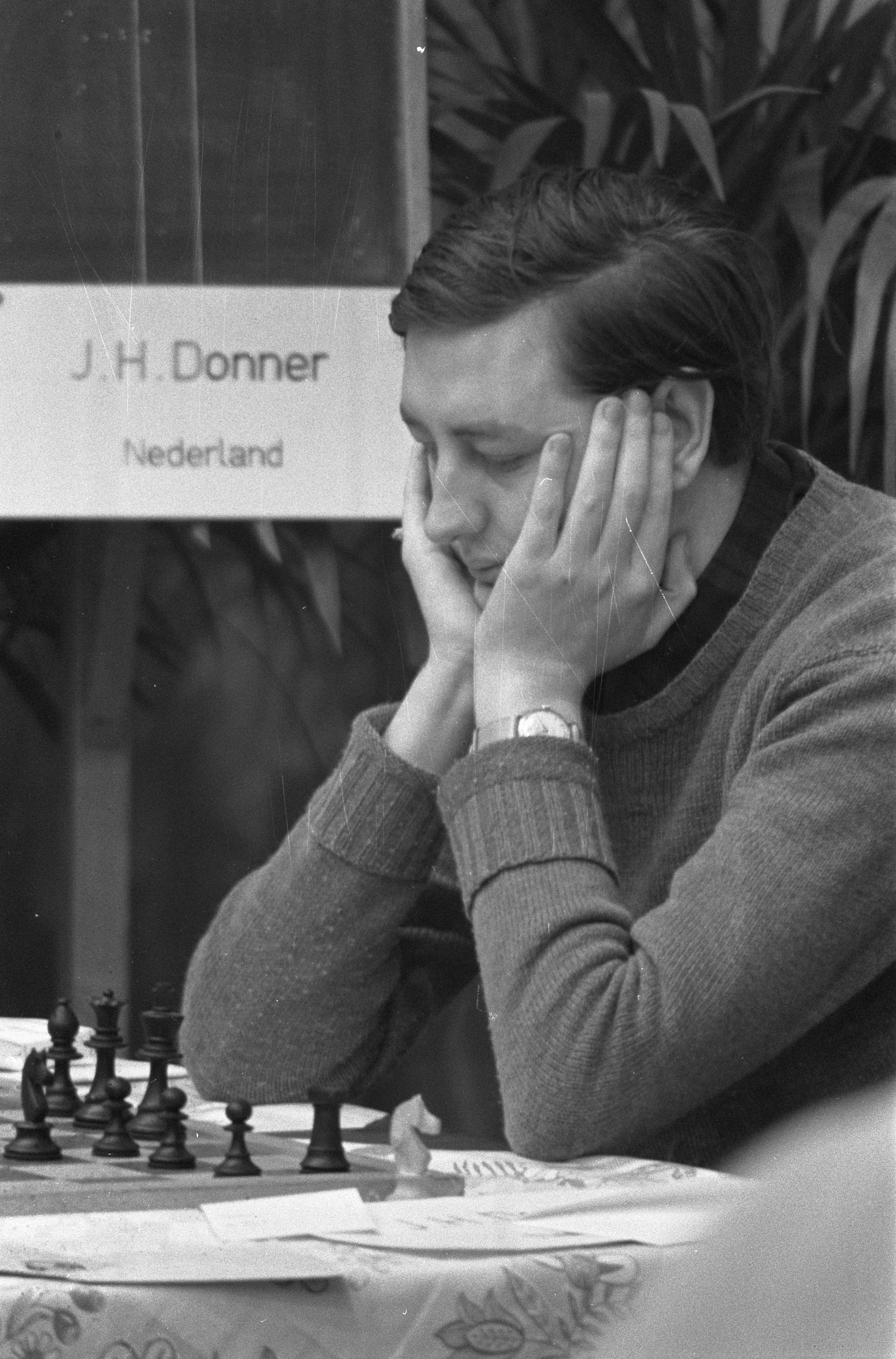
Donner in 1960

- "I love all positions. Give me a difficult positional game, I'll play it. Give me a bad position, I'll defend it. Openings, endgames, complicated positions, and dull, drawn positions, I love them all and will give my best efforts. But totally winning positions I cannot stand."
- Writing of Lodewijk Prins, after Prins had won the Dutch Championship: "He hasn't got a clue. He is the worst player in the whole wide world. ... Dear Lodewijk. ... You've won the title and I want to congratulate you. But I think you cannot tell a knight from a bishop and I'm prepared to prove it, too. ... We'll play a match." Prins declined Donner's match offer.
- "After I resigned this game with perfect self-control and solemnly shook hands with my opponent in the best of Anglo-Saxon traditions, I rushed home, where I threw myself onto my bed, howling and screaming, and pulled the blankets over my face."
- Donner's remark about winning from a dead-lost position: "I couldn't resist saying something that I had never said before after winning a game of chess. I may have thought it, but I had never said it. I said, 'Sorry.'"
- "Chess is and will always be a game of chance."
- "It is mainly the irreparability of a mistake that distinguishes chess from other sports. A whole game long and there is only one point to score. Just one mistake and the battle is lost, even though the fight may go on for hours. ... That's why a mistake hits so hard in chess."
- On playing the black pieces against the move 1.e4: "I don't like this move. And they know it." Donner, The Master Game, BBC2
- "How different is chess in the United States. The game of chess has never been held in great esteem by the North Americans. Their culture is steeped in deeply anti-intellectual tendencies. They pride themselves in having created the game of poker. It is their national game, springing from a tradition of westward expansion, of gun-slinging skirt chasers who slept with cows and horses. They distrust chess as a game of Central European immigrants with a homesick longing for clandestine conspiracies in quiet coffee houses. Their deepest conviction is that bluff and escalation will achieve more than scheming and patience (witness their foreign policy)."
- "... it doesn't take much insight into human nature to predict that Fischer will not be world champion for long. His quirks, moods and whims will turn against him at the moment when he has reached the top. He'll hit out hard, but at nothing but thin air."
- "The difference between the sexes is remarkable in chess, but not any more so, to my mind, than in any other field of cultural activity. Women cannot play chess, but they cannot paint either, or write, or philosophize. In fact, women have never thought or made anything worth considering."
- According to Jonathan Speelman:

In round one of the Olympiad China won a famous victory over Iceland. Amongst the casualties was Grandmaster Sigurjonsson who lost to Qi Jung Xuan. Coming upon Sigurjonsson, ... Donner had attempted to console him with the following unfortunate choice of words: "Tell me, Grandmaster, how can a Western European Grandmaster lose to a Chinaman?" In round eight, the Chinese played Holland. And the unlucky Donner got an answer to his question...

Speelman was referring to the game Liu Wenzhe–Donner, Buenos Aires 1978: 1.e4 d6 2.d4 Nf6 3.Nc3 g6 4.Be2 Bg7 5.g4 h6 6.h3 c5 7.d5 0-0 8.h4 e6 9.g5 hxg5 10.hxg5 Ne8 11.Qd3 exd5 12.Nxd5 Nc6 13.Qg3 Be6 14.Qh4 f5 15.Qh7+ Kf7 16.Qxg6+ Kxg6 17.Bh5+ Kh7 18.Bf7+ Bh6 19.g6+ Kg7 20.Bxh6+ 1–0

- "Computers cannot play chess at all, and they will never be able to, at least not for the next two thousand years or so, for that would take a technology that is still far beyond the horizon ... ."
- "My name is J. H. Donner, 'Hein' for friends. 'Jan-Hein' was an unseemly joke of malicious sport journalists, but that's not my name, it never was and it never will be."

== Notable games ==
Donner considered the following games to be his two best:

- Donner vs. Octav Troianescu, Wageningen Zonal, 1957
  1.d4 Nf6 2.c4 e6 3.Nc3 Bb4 4.e3 c5 5.Bd3 0-0 6.Nf3 d5 7.0-0 Nc6 8.a3 cxd4 9.exd4 dxc4 10.Bxc4 Be7 11.Re1 a6 12.Ba2 b5 13.d5 exd5 14.Nxd5 Nxd5 15.Qxd5 Bb7 16.Qh5 g6 17.Qh6 Nd4 18.Ng5 Bxg5 19.Bxg5 Qb6 20.Rad1 Rac8 21.Re7 Qd6 22.Kh1 Qc6 23.Rxb7 Nf5 24.Bd5 Qc2 25.Rc1 Qe2 26.Bxf7+ Kh8 27.Bf6+ 1–0
- Donner vs. Bent Larsen, Wageningen Zonal 1957
  1.d4 Nf6 2.c4 g6 3.g3 Bg7 4.Bg2 0-0 5.Nc3 d6 6.Nf3 Nc6 7.0-0 a6 8.d5 Na5 9.Nd2 c5 10.Qc2 Rb8 11.b3 b5 12.cxb5 axb5 13.Bb2 b4 14.Nd1 Ba6 15.Re1 Bh6 16.e4 Bxd2 17.Qxd2 c4 18.e5 Ne8 19.Qd4 c3 20.Nxc3 bxc3 21.Bxc3 f6 22.Qa7 Nxb3 23.axb3 Ra8 24.Ba5 Rxa7 25.Bxd8 fxe5 26.f4 Ng7 27.Bb6 Raa8 28.fxe5 Nf5 29.exd6 exd6 30.Bf2 Rfb8 31.g4 Nh6 32.Re7 Nxg4 33.Bd4 Rb4 34.Rg7+ Kf8 35.Rxh7 Bb7 36.Rf1+ Ke8 37.Bg7 Rd8 38.Rf8+ Kd7 39.Bf6+ 1–0
