= Eugene Torre =

Filipino chess grandmaster (born 1951)

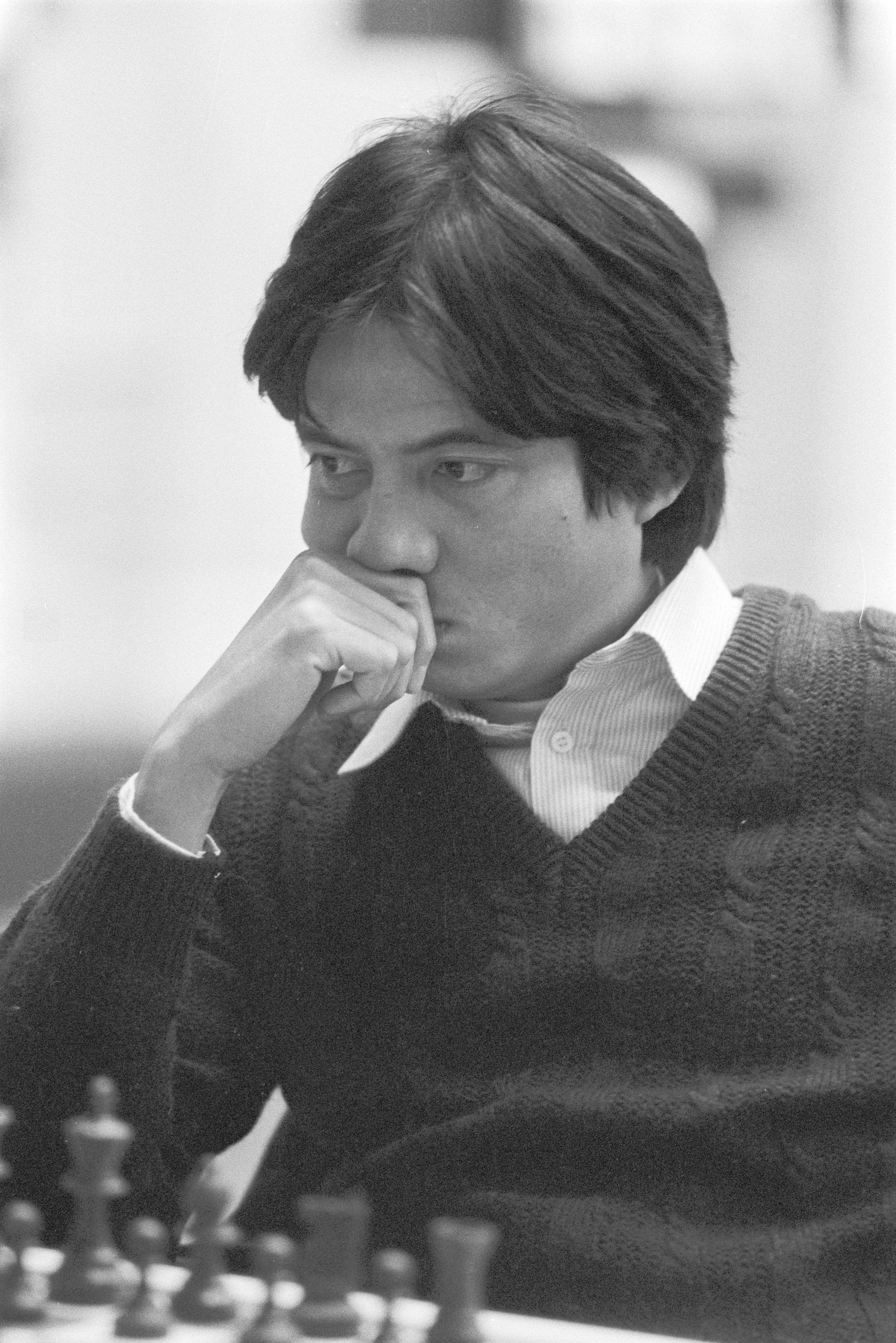
- Torre in 1984

Personal information
- Born: Eugenio Oliveros Torre; November 4, 1951 (age 74) Iloilo, Philippines

Chess career
- Country: Philippines
- Title: Grandmaster (1974)
- FIDE rating: 2423 (September 2026)
- Peak rating: 2580 (January 1983)
- Peak ranking: No. 20 (January 1983)

Eugenio Oliveros Torre (born November 4, 1951) is a Filipino chess grandmaster. In 1974, at 22 years old, he became the first Filipino and non-Soviet Asian to qualify for the title Grandmaster. Torre did this by winning the silver medal in the 21st Chess Olympiad in Nice, France. He is considered the strongest chess player the Philippines produced during the 1980s and 1990s, and played for the Philippines on board 1 in seventeen Chess Olympiads. In 2021, Torre was inducted into the World Chess Hall of Fame.

In a tournament in Manila in 1976, Torre was then the only one to beat the then-reigning World Champion Anatoly Karpov in a game that has become part of Filipino chess history. In 1982 he gained a spot in the World Chess Championship candidates matches, where he lost to Zoltán Ribli. He served as Bobby Fischer's second in the 1992 match against Boris Spassky in Yugoslavia.

In 2020 he played for the Rizal Towers of the Professional Chess Association of the Philippines.

== Chess career ==
=== 1969–1973 ===
Eugene Torre participated in the 1969 (10th) and 1971 (11th) editions of the Junior World Chess Championship, an under-20 chess tournament (players must have been under 20 years old on 1 January in the year of competition) organized by the World Chess Federation (FIDE). It was the brainchild of William Ritson-Morry who organized the inaugural event in 1951 in Birmingham, England.

In the 1971 edition held in Athens, Greece in July–August, a record forty-four players from forty-three countries participated in six preliminary groups. Werner Hug of Switzerland was the surprise winner, scoring 8.5/11. Two years before, he had only finished fifth in Final C. More highly touted players finished lower like Hungarian Chess Olympiad team member and future World Championship candidate Zoltán Ribli who finished second (8/11); the strong American player Kenneth Rogoff finished third (7.5/11); and Torre and the Soviet Grandmaster Rafael Vaganian, who were among three players (René Borngässer) that scored 6.5/11 finishing in a tie for fourth to sixth places. with Torre finishing in 4th place after the Sonneborn Berger (SB) tie-break system was employed.

In 1972, Torre won the Asian Zonal Championship and became an International Master (IM), becoming the Philippines' third IM after IM Rodolfo Tan Cardoso who gained his title after winning the silver medal in the 1956 Chess Olympiad and IM Renato Naranja who achieved his IM title in 1969 when he won the Asian Zonal in Singapore. In September 1972, a Torre – Cardoso showdown was held to determine the Philippines' best player with the winner playing the top board for Team Philippines in the Skopje Olympiad to be held later that month. It was supposed to be a six-game match but after Torre opened up an unassailable two-point lead (3.5–1.5) with 2 wins and 3 draws, the 6th and last game was not played.

In 1972/1973, Torre tied for 1st place with Hungarian GM Levente Lengyel and International Master Ljuben Popow, also known as Luben Popov of Bulgaria, in the Reggio Emilia series known as the Torneo di Capodanno with a score of 7/11. This tournament was held annually from 1958 to 2012, a grand total of 54 editions without any interruptions.

In 1973, Torre participated in the 1973 Leningrad Interzonal Tournament where he played against the world's top players such as future World Champion Karpov, Mikhail Tal, Viktor Korchnoi, Bent Larsen and Robert Eugene Byrne, among others. He ended up in a tie for 13th-14th places in the 18-man round-robin tournament where he finished with 4 wins, 7 losses and 6 draws (7/17) but scored big wins over Tal and Larsen.

=== 1976–1991 ===
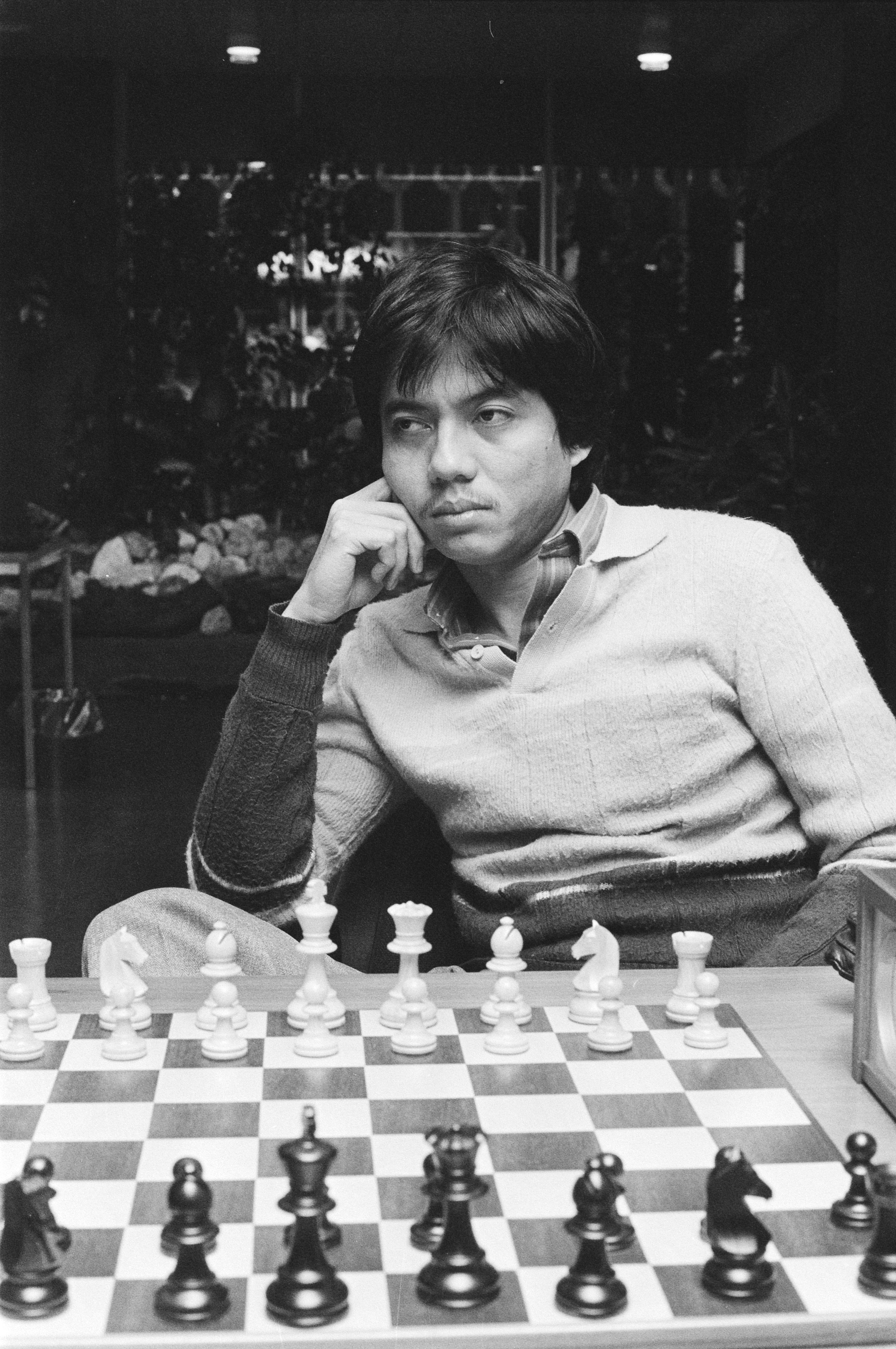
Torre in 1982

Torre reached prominence in 1976 as a possible future title challenger after winning a strong four-man tournament in Manila ahead of World Champion Anatoly Karpov – thus becoming the first player to finish ahead of Karpov in a tournament since the latter became world champion. In the summer of 1976, three grandmasters traveled to Manila, Philippines to participate in the Marlboro-Loyola Kings Challenge chess tournament. They were (in order by Elo): World Champion Anatoly Karpov (2695) from the Soviet Union, Ljubomir Ljubojević (2620) from Yugoslavia, and Walter Browne (2585) from the United States. They were joined by grandmaster Eugenio Torre (2505) from the Philippines for a double-round robin event. The average rating of the players qualified the tournament as a category XV event.

Torre defeated the world champion in the second round, and went on to finish clear first ahead of Karpov, a feat no one had yet accomplished since the latter had become world champion. The final standings and crosstable are as follows:

Manila 1976
		1	2	3	4	Total
1	Torre	–	1 ½	½ 1	1 ½	4½
2	Karpov	0 ½	–	1 ½	½ ½	3
3	Ljubojević	½ 0	0 ½	–	½ 1	2½
4	Browne	0 ½	½ ½	½ 0	–	2

Later in the same year 1976, Torre topped the 2nd Asian Masters held from 23 August to 10 September at Jakarta, Indonesia. The event qualified as a Category III event with an average Elo rating of 2304. At that time, this was only the 2nd international tournament held in Jakarta the first being the FIDE Zonal 10 Tournament in 1963. Torre scored a whopping 12/14, going undefeated with 10 wins and 4 draws. Compatriot Rico Mascariñas earned an IM norm in the same event where he tied for 3rd place with 10/14 (+8, =4, -2).

In 1977, Torre (2550) finished tied for 5th-6th places at the strong Geneva Tournament held from March 26 to April 11, 1977, with GM Ludek Pachman where he recorded 4 wins, 6 draws and 3 losses (7.0/13) but ended up 6th after the SB tiebreaks were applied losing out to Pachman, 47–43.

At the 1st Burroughs Computers Grandmaster Tournament held on April 5–19, 1978, Torre copped second-place finishing with a score of 8/12 on the strength of 6 wins, 4 draws and 2 losses just behind winner Miguel Quinteros. The first leg was held in Baguio City, Philippines, the third leg in Jakarta, Indonesia and the fourth leg in Penang, Malaysia.

In 1979, Torre topped the 7th Marlboro Classic, a 14-man tournament held in Manila in January 1979 finishing clear first, a point ahead of GM Fridrik Olafsson of Iceland and 2 points ahead of top seed Josif Dorfman, a Soviet-French Grandmaster, with a score of 10/13. Also in 1979, Torre tied for 1st place in the 2nd Asian GMs Circuit 1st Leg held in Jakarta from 26 May to 6 June alongside Dorfman and GM Yuri Averbakh all with 6.5/11 recording 5 wins, 3 draws and 2 losses. Coincidentally, they were the top 3 seeds in the tournament with GM Dorfman having a 2595 Elo rating, Torre with 2520 and Averbakh with 2515.

The high point of his career came in the early 1980s when he was ranked world No.17; successfully going on to qualify as a candidate for the world championship after tying for first with Lajos Portisch during the 1982 Toluca Interzonal, thereby becoming the very first Asian ever to qualify in the Candidates. By qualifying in the Candidates, Torre's feat was considered "a vindication of FIDE's democratic world-wide qualifying system". At that time, Torre was viewed as a serious rival to the Soviet grandmasters in the 1984 Candidates Matches considering his head-to-head record with some of the finest Soviet GMs at that time: 2.5–1.5 against Tal, 2–2 opposite Tigran Petrosian, 1.5–2.5 versus Vassily Smyslov and 3.5–5.5 contra Karpov.

Torre finished clear second in the 56th Hastings Premier Tournament, a Category 10 tournament (average Elo 2476) organized by William Ritson-Morry held from 29 December 1980 to 15 January 1981, with a score of 10/15.

Torre has the distinction of being the first Asian player to earn the title of International Grandmaster. He qualified for the Candidates Matches for the 1984 World Championship. In that preliminary stage, the contenders play matches against each other to determine who will challenge the world champion. Torre was eliminated when he lost his match against Zoltán Ribli by a score of 6–4.

In 1984, Torre was selected to play in the second USSR vs. the Rest of the World competition billed as the Match of the Century of 1984 held in London, England. The USSR team was led by the world's two highest ranked players at that time, Garry Kasparov (2710 Elo) and Karpov (2700 Elo) while the Rest of the World was led by Viktor Korchnoi and Ljubomir Ljubojević both with 2635 Elo rating. Torre had an Elo rating of 2565 for this tournament where he contributed 2 points in 3 games, all against Andrei Sokolov, winning 2 and losing once finishing with a performance rating of 2620. He was among the team's high scorers only eclipsed by Korchnoi, Ribli and GM Anthony John Miles who all ended up with 2.5/4 but in terms of winning percentage was the high scorer with 66.7%

Torre finished in a tie for 3rd at the 1986 Brussels SWIFT Tournament, a Category 13 event held in April 1986, alongside Timman and Miles posting 3 wins, 7 draws and 1 loss (6.5/11) but behind Karpov (9/11) and Korchnoi (7/11). Torre's lone loss was inflicted by International Master Michel Jadoul who ended up dead last in the tournament with 2.5/11 (+2,−8,=1).

At the 1988 Biel Tournament held in July, Torre tied for 3rd together with GM Vladimir Tukmakov with a score of 6.5/11, just half a point behind tournament joint 1st placers GM Boris Gulko and GM Ivan Sokolov. Also in 1988 a 6-game Nigel Short vs. Eugenio Torre one-on-one match was held in Manila sponsored by Carlsberg Beer. Torre won the 1st game but Short evened up the match with a win in the 4th game with all the other games ending up in draws as the match ended in a 3–3 tie.

In 1991, Torre was invited to play in the Pan Pacific Grandmaster Tournament. Torre took first place with an 8/11 score (+5−0=6). GM Patrick Wolff of the USA was 2nd with 7/11 with GM Mikhail Tal of Latvia, GM Larry Christiansen and GM Joel Benjamin both of the US and Australian GM Ian Rogers, all tying for 3rd with 6/11. It would be noted that Torre was the second-lowest ranked participant in this tournament with an Elo rating of 2552 only ahead of the sole International Master invited to play, American John Grefe who had a 2400 Elo rating. This was a 12-man tournament with GM Benjamin the top seed (based on Elo) with an Elo rating of 2662, followed by Tal (2645), GM John Fedorowicz (2634) also of the US and GM Utut Adianto (2634) of Indonesia rounding up the 2600-rated players.

=== 2020–present ===
In late 2020, Torre joined the Professional Chess Association of the Philippines, the first professional domestic chess league in the Philippines. He was drafted into the Rizal Towers as the league's top pick in its inaugural draft. However he sat out the All Filipino Conference for the inaugural 2021 season, and served as the team's head coach instead.

At a meeting of the FIDE Council on April 19, 2021, Torre, along with Miguel Najdorf and Judit Polgár, were inducted into the World Chess Hall of Fame. Torre thus became the first male Asian chess player to be given such honor.

== Interzonals ==
Torre participated in 7 FIDE Interzonals where he:

- tied for 13th-14th places at Leningrad 1973 with Wolfgang Uhlmann finishing with 4 wins, 6 draws and 7 losses (7/17) where he ultimately ended up in 14th place;
- 16th place at Manila 1976 where he had 4 wins, 6 draws and 9 losses (7/19);
- shared 7th place with Gyula Sax and Yuri Balashov in Rio de Janeiro 1979 where he posted 6 wins, 6 draws and 5 losses (9/17) where he eventually finished in 8th place;
- tied for 1st at Toluca 1982 where he had a 5-game winning streak from rounds 6–10 which started with a great win against the much higher rated Lev Polugaevsky followed by wins over Amador Rodriguez Cespedes, Krunoslav Hulak, Yasser Seirawan who won the 1979 World Junior Chess Championship and Bachar Kouatly. He finished with 5 wins, 7 draws and a single loss (8.5/13) thereby qualifying for the 1984 Candidates Matches;
- tied for 4th qualifying place at Biel 1985 with Nigel Short and John van der Wiel that necessitated a playoff among the 3 players where Short eventually advanced with Torre finishing in 6th place. He posted 7 wins, 7 draws and 3 losses (10.5/17);
- sole 7th place at Zagreb 1987 where he posted 6 wins, 6 draws and 4 losses (9/16) including a big win over eventual winner Viktor Korchnoi in Round 13 and lastly
- at Manila 1990 where 64 players participated in this Swiss-format tournament of 13 rounds played from 29 June to 14 July at the Ninoy Aquino Stadium. Aside from Torre, the home country was represented also by International Master Rico Mascariñas. Both Torre and Mascariñas did not advance to the Candidates Matches with the former ending up in a tie for 29th–39th places with 6.5/13 ultimately ending up in 33rd place and the latter ending up in a tie for 54th–57th places with 5/13 (finished 55th place).

== Olympiads, Team Championships and Asian Games ==
Eugene Torre
Medal record

Representing Philippines

Asian Games
Silver medal – second place	2010 Guangzhou	Men's Team

Chess Olympiad
Bronze medal – third place	2016 Baku	Men's Olympiad

Chess Olympiad
Bronze medal – third place	1986 Dubai	Men's Olympiad

Chess Olympiad
Bronze medal – third place	1980 Valletta	Men's Olympiad

Chess Olympiad
Silver medal – second place	1974 Nice	Men's Olympiad

Asian Team Chess Championship
Bronze medal – third place	1986 Dubai	Men's Team

Asian Team Chess Championship
Gold medal – first place	1983 New Delhi	Men's Team

Asian Team Chess Championship
Gold medal – first place	1981 Hangzhou	Men's Team

Asian Team Chess Championship
Gold medal – first place	1979 Singapore	Men's Team

Asian Team Chess Championship
Gold medal – first place	1977 Auckland	Men's Team

Asian Cities Chess Championship
Gold medal – first place	2002 Aden	Men's Team

Asian Cities Chess Championship
Bronze medal – third place	2004 Manila	Men's Team

=== Olympiads ===
The high points of his Olympiad career were winning the:

- Silver Medal (Individual Standings, Board 1) at the 21st Chess Olympiad (1974 Nice, France) where he went undefeated in 19 games (nine wins and ten draws) for 14 points for a 73.7% winning percentage and a high 2622 performance rating (as compared to his Elo rating of 2450). Team Philippines achieved its initial highest finish of 11th place at the 1974 Chess Olympiad which was improved on by the 1988 Philippine Team.
- Bronze Medal (Individual Standings, Board 1): 24th Chess Olympiad (1980 Valletta, Malta) where he scored 11 points in 14 games (nine wins, four draws, and one loss) for a winning percentage of 78.6% and performance rating of 2683 (2520 Elo);
- Bronze Medal (Individual Standings, Board 1) 27th Chess Olympiad (1986 Dubai, UAE) where he garnered 9½ points in 13 games (seven wins, five draws, and one loss) with a 73.1% winning percentage and 2637 performance rating (2540 Elo), and
- Bronze Medal (Individual Standings, Board 3) 42nd Chess Olympiad (2016 Baku, Azerbaijan) where he finished again undefeated in 11 games (9 wins and 2 draws) for a winning percentage of 90.9% and a very impressive performance rating of 2836 (2447 Elo) at the age of 65.

In 1988, Torre captained the Philippine team to its best-ever 7th-place finish in the 28th Chess Olympiad in Thessaloniki, Greece. breaking the previous high of 11th-place finish at the 21st Chess Olympiad. Torre finished with 9 points on 6 wins, 6 draws and 2 losses manning Board 1 with a high performance rating of 2620 as compared to his Elo rating of 2555. His teammates then included International Masters (IMs) Rico Mascariñas and Rubén Rodríguez who played Boards 2 and 3, and then 3 untitled players namely Rogelio Antonio (Board 4), Eric Gloria (Reserve Board 1) and Rogelio Barcenilla (Reserve Board 2).

At the 39th Chess Olympiad held at Khanty-Mansiysk in 2010, Torre manned Board 4 for the Philippines and played 7 games where he scored 4½ points with 3 wins, 3 draws and 1 loss with a performance rating of 2460 which was a shade below his Elo rating of 2489. In 2012, Torre participated in his record 21st Olympiad appearance at the 40th Chess Olympiad breaking his tie with Lajos Portisch held at Istanbul, Turkey. He manned Board 3 in this edition of the Olympiad. He scored 3½ points in 7 games on the strength of 2 wins, 3 draws and 2 losses. He recorded a very high performance rating of 2611 in this Olympiad, higher than his 2469 Elo rating. In 2014, Torre again manned Board 3 for Team Philippines in the 2014 Tromsø Olympiad for his record-setting 22nd appearance in the said tournament. He scored 5½ points in 9 games posting 3 wins, 5 draws against a solitary loss. He recorded a performance rating of 2527 and gained 9.9 Elo points in the said Olympiad. His Elo rating then was 2438.

In the 2016 42nd Chess Olympiad held at Baku, Azerbaijan, Torre played in his 23rd Olympiad, further extending his record, where he played on Board 3 for the Philippines. He played in all 11 games, the only Philippine player to do so, winning 9 games and drawing 2. He had a very high performance rating of 2836 and won the bronze medal for Board 3 just behind former teammate Wesley So of the United States and Zoltán Almási of Hungary. He gained 46.9 Elo rating points increasing his Elo rating from 2447 to 2494. At the conclusion of the 2016 Chess Olympiad in Baku, Azerbaijan, Torre had already played 270 games with 103 wins, 124 draws and 43 losses for a grand total of 165 points (61.1% winning percentage).

=== Asian Team Chess Championship ===
He also has taken part in six Asian Team Chess Championship (1977, 1979, 1981, 1983, 1986, 1993). Torre has an outstanding record at this tournament where he won the gold medal 4 times: for his score in the 1977 (Auckland, New Zealand), 1979 (Singapore), 1981 (Hangzhou, China) and 1983 (New Delhi, India) editions. He also won the bronze in the 1993 (Kuala Lumpur, Malaysia) competition. In all six team championships, Torre manned the top board for Team Philippines. He has played 43 games scoring 35½ points built around 29 wins, 13 draws and a solitary loss for a winning percentage of 82.6%.

- In the 1977 edition (2nd Asian Team Chess Championship) held in Auckland, New Zealand, Torre played 7 games, going undefeated with 5 wins and 2 draws for a winning percentage of 85.7 and a tournament performance rating (TPR) of 2615 as compared to his 2550 Elo rating winning the gold medal as well as leading the team to the Team Gold Medal;
- He also won the gold medal in the 1979 edition (3rd Asian Team Chess Championship) held at Singapore going undefeated once again by winning 5 games and drawing 1 for a winning percentage of 91.7 with a TPR of 2671 (2520 Elo ). Again, Team Philippines also won the Team Gold Medal;
- In the 1981 edition (4th Asian Team Chess Championship) held in Hangzhou, China, Torre was again undefeated with 4 wins and 2 draws for a winning percentage of 83.3 and a 2604 TPR (2525 Elo) and again brought home the gold medal as well as leading again the team to the Team Gold Medal; and lastly,
- In the 1983 edition (5th Asian Team Chess Championship) held in New Delhi, India he scored a near perfect score of 8½/9 winning 8 games and drawing 1 in another undefeated tournament with a winning percentage of 94.4% and an outstanding TPR of 2743 (2570 Elo) on the way to another gold medal but settled for the Team Silver medal behind China.
- It was in the 1986 edition (6th Asian Team Chess Championship) held in Dubai, UAE where Torre suffered his only loss against Malaysian International Master (IM) Liew Chee Meng in the fifth round. It was also in this edition that Torre did not win any medal of any color when he placed a dismal 6th place in Board 1 scoring 4 points by virtue of 3 wins, 2 draws and the loss against Meng for a winning percentage of 66.7 and a TPR of 2431 (2540 Elo). However, Torre captained the team to another Team Gold Medal.
- In the 1993 edition (10th Asian Team Chess Championship), he bounced back by going undefeated once again scoring 6½ points in 9 games, winning 4 and drawing 5 for a winning percentage of 72.2% and a TPR of 2584 (2540 Elo) where he brought home a bronze medal as well as the Team Bronze Medal. This bronze medal capped Torre's magnificent record in the history of the Asian Chess Team Championship.

=== Asian Cities Chess Championships ===
In 2002 and 2004, Torre also manned the top board for Team Philippines in the 13th (Aden 2002) and 14th (Manila 2004) editions of the Asian Cities Chess Championship.

- The 13th edition was held at Aden, Yemen where Torre scored 5½ points in nine games on the strength of three wins, five draws and one loss and despite not winning any medal in the individual category, he led Team Manila to a bronze medal behind Kazakhstan and Uzbekistan. He had a TPR of 2421 which was below his Elo of 2536 at that time;
- Manila, Philippines hosted the 14th edition where Torre scored 5 points in eight games (four wins, two draws, and two losses) with a TPR of 2441 as compared to his 2521 Elo. He led Team Tagaytay to the gold medal in this edition.

He has scored 10½ points in 17 games on 7 wins, 7 draws and 3 losses for a winning percentage of 61.8% winning bronze and gold medals in the team category.

=== Asian Games ===
In the 16th Asian Games, Torre helped the Philippines finished second behind China, beating the Indian team in the semifinals to secure the silver medal. He played 8 games as a reserve scoring 5½ points on the strength of 4 wins, 3 draws and a solitary loss for a winning percentage of 68.8% and a TPR of 2470.

=== World Student Chess Team Championships ===
Torre also played Board 3 in the World Student Chess Team Championships in 1969 although he lost his one and only game in the said tournament against William Roland Hartston.

=== Later career ===
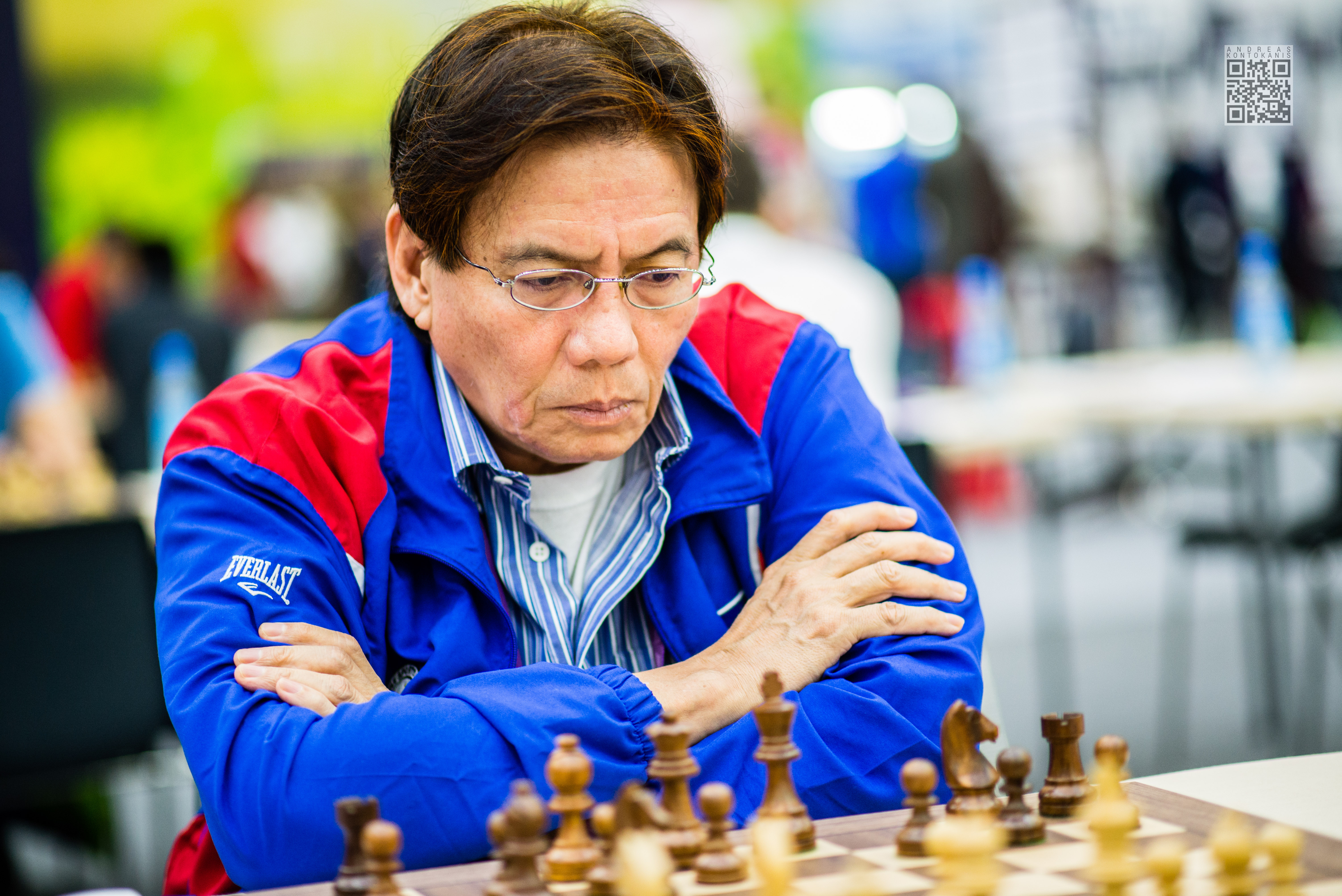
Torre in 2016

In 2003, Torre won the 15th Leuven Open, Belgium held on November 7–11, 2003 that attracted 112 participants. He ended up with an unbeaten 8.0/9 record with an outstanding 2618 TPR as compared to his Elo then of 2508.

In 2010, Torre competed in the 3rd Calgary International Chess Classic held at Alberta, Canada where he flashed his vintage form by finishing in a tie for second through fourth places on the strength of four wins, four draws and a solitary loss against winner GM Victor Mikhalevski, the tournament top seed with Elo Rating of 2614. Torre had an Elo Rating of 2506 during the said tournament.

In 2011, Torre joined two prestigious international chess championships in the Philippines, the Asian Zone 3.3 Chess Championships and the 2nd Chairman Prospero A. Pichay Jr. Cup International Open Chess Championships. He finished in a tie for 15th–21st places in the Asian Zonals eventually placing 18th after tiebreaks (5 points out of nine games on four wins, three losses, and two draws). It was a poor finish for Torre as he had a four-game winning streak from rounds 2 to 5 after an opening round loss to FM Haridas Pascua to take the lead after five rounds but faltered in the last four rounds where he scored only 1 point (two draws and two losses). He had a low performance rating of 2344 in this tournament. In the 2nd Pichay Cup, he improved a little bit by scoring 6½ points in 10 games to finish in a tie for 11th–18th places eventually finishing in 14th place (four wins, five draws, and one loss). This is another heartbreaker as he was stalled by five draws despite losing only one game to Chinese Lu Shanglei. In this tournament he had a performance rating of 2496.

He won the title via tiebreak over fellow GM John Paul Gomez. The tournament also served as the qualifying tournament for the 2014 Olympiad to be held in Tromsø, Norway in August.

In 2016, Torre was part of the 2nd batch of inductees of the Philippine Sports Hall of Fame cited by the Philippine Sports Commission. In the 42nd Chess Olympiad held at Baku, Azerbaijan he scored an undefeated 10/11, with a performance rating of 2836, thanks to which he won the individual bronze medal on board three.

In 2017, Torre was invited to the prestigious Reykjavik Open by virtue of his strong performance in the 2016 Olympiad. He acquitted himself well in this tournament (won by Anish Giri), scoring 7 out of 10 (7 wins 3 losses) and tying for 11th to 29th places eventually settling for 13th after the tiebreaks. His strong performance in this tournament belied his starting rank of No. 36 with an Elo of 2455 as he recorded a TPR of 2464 and gained 3.2 rating points.

=== Seniors Chess Championship ===
In October 2017, Torre won the 8th edition of the Asian Senior Chess Championship, held in Auckland, New Zealand, in the 65+ category, scoring 9/9 points, a clear 2.5 points from joint 2nd placers Kiwi FM Ewen Green and fellow Filipino Edmundo Legaspi.

By virtue of this victory, he represented the Philippines in the 27th World Senior Chess Championship 2017 Open 65+ where he tied for 2nd-10th places eventually placing 7th after applying the Buchholz tiebreaks scoring 8.0/11 (+7 =2 -1).

One year later in 2018, he retained his title by winning the 9th edition of the Asian Senior Chess Championship in the same category in Tagaytay, Philippines where fellow Filipino IM Chito Garma won the 50+ category.

== Friendship with Bobby Fischer ==
Torre was a friend of Bobby Fischer. He worked on Fischer's team in the 1992 rematch with Boris Spassky in Yugoslavia. Much later, Torre conducted interviews with Fischer on Filipino radio dzRH MBC Sports Center. Those interviews gained notoriety for Fischer and despair for his fans as he believed he would be killed in the United States after being deported from Japan. Torre was involved in 1996 when Fischer Random Chess was launched.

== Notable games ==
In a tournament in Manila in 1976, Torre beat then-reigning World Champion Anatoly Karpov in a game that has become part of Filipino chess history:

Karpov vs. Torre, Sicilian Defence, Richter–Rauzer Attack (ECO B67)
1. e4 c5 2. Nf3 Nc6 3. d4 cxd4 4. Nxd4 Nf6 5. Nc3 d6 6. Bg5 e6 7. Qd2 a6 8. 0-0-0 Bd7 9. f4 b5 10. Qe1 Nxd4 11. Rxd4 Qb6 12. Rd2 Be7 13. Bd3 b4 14. Nd1 Bb5 15. Nf2 h6 16. Bh4 g5 17. fxg5 hxg5 18. Bg3?! (18.Bg5 Qa5! 19.Bxb5! axb5 20.Rd3 Rg8 21.h4 Qxa2 22.Qb4 Qc4=/∞ Ostojić) Nh5 19. Ng4 Nxg3 20. hxg3 Rxh1 21. Qxh1 Rc8 22. Kb1 Bxd3 23. cxd3 Qd4!−/+ 24. Qd1 a5 25. Nh2 g4 26. Nxg4 Bg5 27. Rc2 Rxc2 28. Kxc2 a4 29. a3 b3+ 30. Kb1 d5 31. exd5 Qxd5 32. Nf2 Qxg2 33. Ne4 Be3 34. Nc3 Qc6 35. d4 Qc4 36. d5 e5 37. Qh1 Qd3+ 38. Ka1 Bd4 39. Qh8+ Kd7 40. Qa8 Qf1+ 41. Nb1 Qc4 42. Qb7+ Kd6 43. Qb8+ Kxd5 44. Qd8+ Ke6 45. Qe8+ Kf5 46. Qd7+ Kg6 47. Qg4+ Kf6 48. Nc3 Qf1+ 0–1

== Other sports ==
Torre competed for the Philippines in ouk chaktrang (Khmer chess) at the 2023 Southeast Asian Games in Cambodia since traditional chess was not among the sport contested in the regional meet.

== Awards and achievements ==
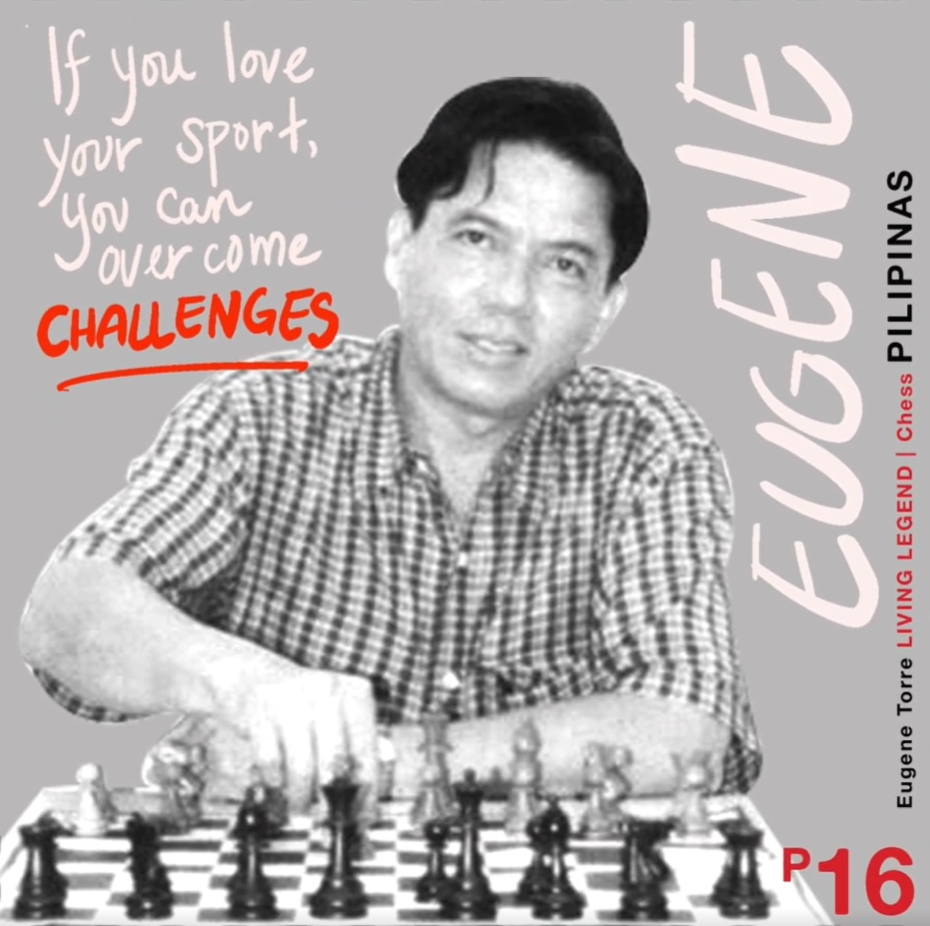
Torre on a 2021 stamp of the Philippines

- Asia's first Grandmaster at the age of 22
- 1969 World Junior Chess Championship, Champion Final B (9 points/11)
- 1970 Philippine Junior and Adult Champion
- 1971 World Junior Chess Championship, 4th place (6.5 points/11)
- 1972 Asian Zonal Championships, Champion and becomes Philippines' 3rd International Master (IM)
- 1972 Winner of the Eugenio Torre vs. Rodolfo Tan Cardoso Showdown
- 1972/73 Torneo di Capodanno (Reggio Emilia Series), Tie for 1st Place (7 points/11)
- 1974 Nice, France Chess Olympiad, Silver medalist on Board 1 going undefeated in 19 games with 9 wins and 10 draws
- 1976 The Marlboro-Loyola Kings Challenge, Champion (becoming the first player to finish ahead of Anatoly Karpov since Karpov became world champion)
- 1977 Asian Chess Team Championships, Gold Medal on Board 1 (6 points/7) 5 wins, 2 draws (undefeated)
- 1979 7th Marlboro Classic, Champion (10 points/13)
- 1979 Asian Chess Team Championships, Gold Medal on Board 1 (5½ points/6) 5 wins, 1 draw (undefeated)
- 1980 La Valletta, Malta Chess Olympiad, Bronze medalist on Board 1 scoring 11 points/14 (9 wins, 4 draws, 1 loss)
- 1980/1981 56th Hastings Premier Tournament, 2nd place (10 points/15) and won Brilliancy Award
- 1981 Asian Chess Team Championships, Gold Medal on Board 1 (5 points/6) 4 wins, 2 draws (undefeated)
- 1983 Asian Chess Team Championships, Gold Medal on Board 1 (8½ points/9) 8 wins, 1 draw (undefeated)
- 1984 4th International Bugojno Tournament, 3rd place (7.5 points/13)
- 1984 Member of the Rest of the World Team against USSR (2nd Edition) where he scored 2 points out of 3 (66.7% performance)
- 1986 Dubai, UAE Chess Olympiad, Bronze medalist on Board 1 garnering 9½ points/13 (7 wins, 5 draws, 1 loss)
- 1986 Brussels SWIFT Tournament, Tie for 3rd place (6.5 points/11)
- 1988 Biel Tournament, Tie for 3rd place (6.5 points/11)
- 1988 Nigel Short vs. Eugenio Torre Showdown, 3-3 Tie
- 1991 Pan Pacific Grandmaster Tournament, 1st place (8 points/11)
- 1993 Asian Chess Team Championships, Bronze Medal on Board 1 (6½ points/9) 4 wins, 5 draws
- 2002 Philippine National Champion
- 2005 Southeast Asian Games, Silver Medal (Men's Standard Team Event)
- 2005 Southeast Asian Games, Bronze Medal (Men's Individual Rapid Chess)
- 2005 5th Bangkok Chess Club Open, 2nd Place (7½/9 lost in tiebreak to Ian Rogers)
- 2006 2nd San Marino International Chess Open, 7th place
- 2008 3rd President Gloria Macapagal Arroyo (PGMA) Cup, Champion (7/9)
- 2010 3rd Calgary International Chess Classic, 2nd place (6/9, tied with IMs Renier Castellanos and Edward Porper)
- 2014 National Chess Championships – Battle of GMs, Champion
- 2010 20th Appearance at Chess Olympiad equaling Lajos Portisch
- 2012 21st Appearance at Chess Olympiad held at Istanbul, Turkey, breaking his tie with Portisch
- 2014 22nd Appearance at Chess Olympiad held at Tromsø, Norway, breaking his old record of 21 appearances
- 2016 23rd Appearance at Chess Olympiad held at Baku, Azerbaijan, breaking his old record of 22 appearances.
- 2016 Baku, Azerbaijan Chess Olympiad, Bronze medalist on Board 3 scoring 10/11 points (undefeated with 9 wins and 2 draws), and a performance rating of 2836. He gained 46.9 Elo rating points in this tournament.
- Ranked as high as No. 17 in the world in the 1980s
- Played Board 2 for Team Philippines in the 1970 Chess Olympiad at Siegen, Germany behind International Master Renato Naranja
- In the 1972 Skopje Olympiad, he assumed the top board (Board 1) for Team Philippines, a position he held until the 2004 Olympiad held at Mallorca, Spain (17 Olympiads, a world record)
- Played Top Board in the following Olympiads: Skopje 1972, Nice 1974 (where he received his GM title and led the Philippines to a then unprecedented 11th-place finish), Haifa 1976, Buenos Aires, 1978, Malta 1980, Lucerne 1982, Thessaloniki 1984, Dubai 1986, Thessaloniki 1988 (where the Philippines recorded its best finish at 7th place), Novi Sad 1990, Manila 1992, Moscow 1994, Yerevan 1996, Elista 1998, Istanbul 2000, Bled 2002 and Calvià de Mallorca 2004
- At the 2006 Olympiad at Turin, Italy, gave way to GM Mark Paragua on top board as he played Board 2 for only the second time in his entire Olympics career
- After 23 Chess Olympiads, Torre had recorded 103 wins, 124 draws and 43 losses in 270 games for a total score of 165 points, second over-all in Olympiad history behind Portisch (176½/260 games). However, he now holds the distinction of having played the most games in the history of the Olympiad with 270.
- Lifetime Achievement Award at the 2017 PSA Annual Awards
- Champion, 8th Asian Senior Chess Championships (65 and over category), Auckland, New Zealand
- Champion, 9th Asian Senior Chess Championships (65 and over category), Tagaytay, Philippines
