= Enrico Sevillano =

Filipino-American chess grandmaster (born 1968)

Personal information
- Born: March 17, 1968 (age 58) Cebu City, Philippines

Chess career
- Country: Philippines (until 2002); United States (since 2002)
- Title: Grandmaster (2012)
- Peak rating: 2537 (September 2012)

Enrico Sevillano (born March 17, 1968) is a Filipino and American chess player who received the FIDE title of Grandmaster (GM) in September 2012. He plays for the United States Chess Federation (USCF) where he has a Regular Rating of 2542, Quick Rating of 2488 and Blitz Rating of 2572 (as of December 2020). He is ranked #112 among all players in the US, #72 among all active players, #235 in the American Continent (#179 among active players) and #1796 among all players in the world (#1408 among active players). Per FIDE, he reached a peak rating of 2537 and currently has an ELO standard rating of 2447 and blitz rating of 2515.

== Early life ==
Sevillano grew up in the Philippines. All of Enrico's older relatives, including his dad and grandmother, played chess.

== Chess career ==
=== World and Asian Junior Chess Championship ===
Sevillano won the prestigious 10th Asian Junior Chess Championship held in Manila, Philippines in 1986.

He also took part in two (2) World Junior Chess Championship editions:

- At the 1985 Sharjah World Junior Chess Championship, the then untitled Sevillano finished tied for 4th-9th places with 8.5/13 (+7 =3 -3) eventually ending up in 9th place after tie-breaks. He had a TPR of 2409.
- At the 1987 Baguio World Junior Chess Championship Sevillano, now an IM with an ELO of 2315 tied for 39th-44th places ultimately copping 39th place after having the best tiebreak (92.5) scoring 5.5/13 (+3 =5 -5) with a 2324 TPR.

Overall, he has compiled 14 points in 26 games on the strength of 10 wins, 8 draws and 8 losses for a winning rate of 53.8%.

=== Chess Olympiad ===
Sevillano was a two-time participant in the Chess Olympiad for the Philippines:

- At the 30th Chess Olympiad (1992) in Manila, Philippines where he manned the First Reserve Board as an IM (2345 ELO) and played impressively scoring 7.0/9 (+6 =2 -1) for a 77.8% winning rate and a high 2501 TPR and placed 6th overall among First Reserve Board players. He was the best performer for Team Philippines in this Olympiad where the team placed 31st.
- At the 31st Chess Olympiad (1994) in Moscow, Russia, he was assigned this time to play Board 3 for Team Philippines where he had an ELO of 2445. He recorded 6.5/11 posting 5 wins, 3 draws and 3 losses for a 59.1% winning rate and a high 2554 TPR and placing 31st among all Board 3 participants. He led the team to a 21st place finish in this Olympiad.

Overall, he has a record of 13.5 points in 20 games recording 11 wins, 5 draws and 4 losses for a 67.5% winning rate.

=== Asian Team Chess Championship ===
Event	Board	ELO	Record	Winning %	Individual result	Rank	TPR	Team result
Penang Asian Team Chess Championship (9th) 1991	1st Reserve Board	2340	+1 =0 -2	33.3%	1.0/3	---	2212	Silver
Kuala Lumpur Asian Team Chess Championship (10th) 1993	2nd Reserve Board	2375	+4 =1 -1	75.0%	4.5/6	Silver	2393	Bronze

He ended his stint in the Asian Team Chess Championship with a total 5.5 points in 9 games posting 5 wins, 1 draw and 3 losses and a 61.1% winning rate winning 3 medals all in all: 1 silver medal in individual play and 1 silver and 1 bronze in team competitions.

=== Other significant tournaments ===
==== International Chess Festival ====
Sevillano is a regular participant in the International Chess Festival held in Las Vegas, USA:

- 2013 edition where he tied for 1st-6th places with Super GMs Wesley So (2728), Jaan Ehlvest (2692), Varuzhan Akobian (2685), Alejandro Ramirez (2665) and Manuel Leon Hoyos (2651) where all six (6) players scored 5.0/6 and won US$2,175.00 each.
- 2014 edition where he wound up in a tie for 2nd-12th places with Super GMs Lazaro Bruzon (2744) and Aleksandr Lenderman (2717) with a score of 4.5/6, half a point off winner Super GM Gata Kamsky (2791). All the 10 tied players won US$769.00.
- 2016 edition where he tied for 20th-33rd places with 3.0/6 (3 wins 3 losses) ultimately ending up in 24th place, The tournament was a 54-player field with a 2307 average ELO rating.

==== Edmonton International Open ====
- Sevillano tied for 1st-3rd places in the Edmonton Invitational 2015 held from November 6–12, 2015 at Alberta, Canada, a 10-player tournament with an average ELO of 2280, with a total score of 7.5 points together with fellow GMs Jesse Kraai and Tejas Bakre eventually settling for runner-up honors behind Kraai.
- In the 2018 edition held from June 19–24, a Category 6 tournament with a 2392 ELO average, Sevillano ended up in a tie for 3rd-5th places scoring 5.5/9, 2.5 points off winner Super GM Anton Kovalyov of Canada (2651) who scored 8.0/9.

==== Calgary International Chess Classic ====
- Sevillano, then still an IM, won the 4th Calgary International Chess Classic held from May 19–23, 2011. He scored 6.5/9 in the 9-round event registering 5 wins, 3 draws and one loss in a tie with GM Kraai but won the title on tie-breaks. He had a TPR of 2478 in this tournament as compared to his ELO then of 2510.
- Sevillano, now a full-fledged GM, also won the 7th Calgary International Chess Classic held from November 6–12, 2014 where he scored 7.0/9 in a tie with GM Victor Mikhalevski but won the title on better tie-breaks (21.75-20.25) going unbeaten with 6 wins and 2 draws.

==== US tournaments ====
Sevillano won the 2008 US Open Championship on better tie-breaks (45-43.5-43.5) over American GM Alexander Shabalov and IM Rade Milovanovic of Bosnia (but has represented the US since 2002) who all scored 8.0/9. He went unbeaten in the tournament with 7 wins and 2 draws.

On January 19, 2009, Sevillano won the overall championship of the Western Class Championships in Agoura Hills, California. Sevillano and fellow IM Andranik Matikozyan both finished with 5.5 points, but Sevillano won the title after tie-breaks.

In May 2009, Sevillano won the Westwood Spring International Open chess championship.

Sevillano also won the 21st Metropolitan Chess FIDE Invitational, in August 2012.

Sevillano also participated in the US Class Championship, a six-round event held from October 31 to November 2, 2014 at the spacious Santa Clara Convention Center. Sevillano ended up in a tie for 2nd place with IM Ricardo de Guzman both ending up with 4.5/6 and each received US$803.00 in the tournament won by GM Cristian Chirila.

GM Sevillano also won the US National G/60 Championship that was held from November 5–7, 2004 at Durango, Colorado, USA with a perfect score of 7/7.

Sevillano also joined the 2014 North American Open won by SGM So with 8.0/9 (+7 =2 -0) held from December 26–30, 2014. He finished in a tie for 6-16th places all with 6.0/9 where he went unbeaten recording 3 wins and 6 draws and all the tied players each won US$396.55.

He placed 6th in the 8-player field, 7-round robin 28th Southern California Chess Championship held from July 7–12, 2016 scoring 2.5/7 where he had 2 wins, 1 draw and 4 losses which was won by IM Bryant.

He also participated in the 2020 US Amateur Team West Championship held last February 15–18, 2020 where he scored 3.0 points in 4 games winning 2 (versus Mike Arne and Gabriel James Koop Bick) and drawing 2 (against IMs Joshua Sheng and Keaton Kiewra).
