= Max Fuller =

Australian chess player (1945–2013)

Maxwell Fuller
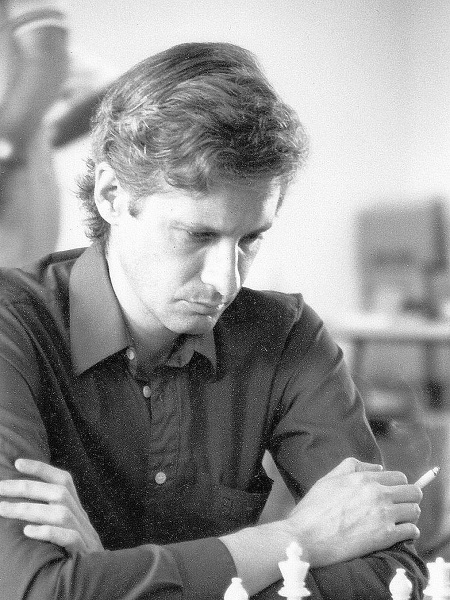
- Maxwell Fuller at the Doeberl Cup in 1985.

Personal information
- Born: 28 January 1945 Sydney, Australia
- Died: 27 August 2013 (aged 68) Sydney, Australia

Chess career
- Country: Australia
- Title: FIDE Master (1981)
- Peak rating: 2400 (January 1975)

Maxwell Leonard Fuller (28 January 1945 – 27 August 2013) was an Australian chess FIDE Master (FM). He shared first in the 1972 Australian Chess Championship, and represented Australia in nine Chess Olympiads between 1964 and 1990.

== Chess career ==
Fuller won the Australian Junior Chess Championship in 1963, and represented Australia at the World Junior Chess Championship in Vrnjačka Banja, Yugoslavia later that year. He finished equal first with Trevor Hay in the 1972 Australian Chess Championship in Melbourne. The play-off match between them was tied 5-5, so they were declared joint champions, a relatively rare occurrence.

In the 1972 Asian Zonal Championship in Hong Kong, he finished equal second with Kan and Tan, behind Eugenio Torre. After the play-off match with Tan and Kan was also tied, the second qualifying place into the Interzonal was decided by a random drawing of lots. If Fuller had chosen the right envelope, he would have automatically gained the IM title and the Interzonal place, but Tan Lian Ann chose the correct envelope and went on to the 1973 Interzonal in Petrópolis, Brazil.

In the 1974 Asian Team Chess Championship in Penang, Fuller played on board one for Australia and scored 6/7, winning the individual gold medal.

Fuller won the Australian Open in 1973 and 1975, and the Doeberl Cup in 1974, 1975 and 1983. He won the New South Wales state championship in 1965, 1986, and in 1988 (shared with Dmitry Gedevanishvili). He won the NSW Lightning Chess Championship in 1967, 1970, 1971, 1972, 1973 and 1986, and the City of Sydney Championship in 1964, 1965, 1966, 1971 and jointly with Flatow and Levin in 1981.

Fuller shared second place at the British Chess Championship in Coventry 1970, and in Morecambe 1975, as the events were also open to citizens of any Commonwealth country.

Fuller represented Australia in nine Chess Olympiads between 1964 and 1990, usually on board 2 (six times), scoring 59 points from 106 games (+40 =38 -28). His Olympiad victories include wins against IM Lazaros Viantiadis (1968), IM Peter Biyiasas and IM Tüdeviin Üitümen (1974), IM Juan Manuel Bellón López (1976) and IM Leif Øgaard (1978). He was the captain of the Australian team at the 1986 and 1990 Chess Olympiads.

In the 1970s, Fuller lived for some years in London, making him the first Australian to try to become chess professional. In the late 1990s he scaled down his chess activity, partly due to health problems. Fuller returned to chess in 2004 after an eight-year absence and finished equal second in the 2004 and 2005 NSW championships, before finally retiring from FIDE rated chess tournaments. His highest FIDE rating was 2400 in 1975.

== Notable games ==
Bellón López vs. Fuller, Haifa 1976

Position: h1 white king, f1 white rook, h2 white pawn, b2 black queen, g3 black knight, f3 white bishop, b4 black rook, e5 black bishop, d5 white pawn, h6 white bishop, g6 black pawn, a6 white queen, h7 black pawn, f7 black pawn, d7 black pawn, g8 black king

Final position
- Juan Manuel Bellón López - Maxwell Fuller, 22nd Chess Olympiad Haifa (1976), Sicilian: Taimanov Variation, (B47), 0-1

1. e4 c5 2. Nf3 Nc6 3. d4 cxd4 4. Nxd4 Qc7 5. Nc3 e6 6. Be2 a6 7. O-O Nf6 8. Kh1 Nxd4 9. Qxd4 Bc5 10. Qd3 b5 11. f4 b4 12. Na4 Ba7 13. c4 Bb7 14. Bf3 e5 15. a3 bxa3 16. b3 Bd4 17. Ra2 O-O 18. Bxa3 Rfe8 19. Rd2 Bc6 20. Nc3 Qa5 21. Bb2 Rab8 22. fxe5 Bxe5 23. Nd5 Bxd5 24. exd5 Rxb3 25. Qxb3 Qxd2 26. Bc1 Qd4 27. g3 Rb8 28. Qc2 Rc8 29. Bg5 Rxc4 30. Qf5 g6 31. Qb1 Ne4 32. Bh6 Rb4 33. Qa2 Qb2 34. Qxa6 Nxg3+ 0-1
