= Syed Nasir Ali =

Indian chess player

Personal information
- Born: 15 August 1936 Kanpur, Uttar Pradesh, India
- Died: 29 May 2018 (aged 81)

Chess career
- Country: India
- Peak rating: 2385 (January 1983)

Syed Nasir Ali (15 August 1936 – 29 May 2018) was an Indian chess player who won the Indian Chess Championship in 1967.

== Biography ==
Nasir Ali Syed was born in Kanpur, Uttar Pradesh. His introduction to chess was purely accidental. While preparing for his final exams, Nasir Ali used to visit a friend of his. This friend knew how to play chess. One fine day, he taught Nasir Ali the rules of the game and started playing with him. They played hundreds of games against each other and each time, the friend, who was better than Nasir Ali, defeated him. "You can never defeat me!" these words spoken by his friend touched Nasir and he decided to work harder at his game. He tried to find new partners to play with and took part in any chess event that was held in Kanpur. Naturally, his chess strength started growing. The next time Nasir Ali met his friend, he beat him fair and square. The satisfaction was immense and along with it came the thought, "If I can defeat him, I can defeat anyone!" Nasir Ali believed in his abilities, worked hard, won many tournaments in India and became the national champion in 1967. Nasir Ali's highest Elo rating was 2385. In 1969 in Singapore he shared 6th-7th place in FIDE World Chess Championship West Asian zonal tournament. He could not achieve the International Master title due to lack of opportunities.

Syed Nasir Ali played for India in the Men's Asian Team Chess Championships:

- In 1977, at fourth board in the 2nd Asian Team Chess Championship in Auckland (+1, =1, -3),
- In 1983, at fourth board in the 5th Asian Team Chess Championship in New Delhi (+2, =3, -0) and won team bronze medal.

He was active in the Indian chess tournaments even after his retirement from CRPF, until the final days of his life. 81-year-old Nasir Ali Syed died on 29 May 2018.
