= Liu Wenzhe =

Chinese chess player (1940–2011)

Personal information
- Born: October 7, 1940 Harbin, China
- Died: September 20, 2011 (aged 70) Beijing, China

Chess career
- Country: China
- Title: International Master (1980)
- Peak rating: 2473 (July 2000)

Liu Wenzhe (Chinese: 刘文哲; October 7, 1940 – September 20, 2011) was an International Master chess player. He was one of China's top chess trainers.

Liu Wenzhe played for Guangdong chess club in the China Chess League (CCL).

== Chess career ==
He was the first Chinese player to defeat a grandmaster (Nikolai Krogius in 1965) and the first to be awarded the title of International Master. He is considered a pioneer of chess in China and a founding father of the Chinese School of Chess. He won the Chinese Chess Championship in 1980 and 1982.

Position: a8 black rook, d8 black queen, e8 black knight, f8 black rook, a7 black pawn, b7 black pawn, f7 black king, g7 black bishop, h7 white queen, c6 black knight, d6 black pawn, e6 black bishop, g6 black pawn, c5 black pawn, d5 white knight, f5 black pawn, g5 white pawn, e4 white pawn, a2 white pawn, b2 white pawn, c2 white pawn, e2 white bishop, f2 white pawn, a1 white rook, c1 white bishop, e1 white king, g1 white knight, h1 white rook

Liu Wenzhe-Donner, position after 15...Kf7.

Two years after the end of the Cultural Revolution and Mao Zedong's death and the fall of the Gang of Four in 1976, China competed in their first Olympiad in Buenos Aires. It was there that Liu Wenzhe defeated grandmaster Jan Hein Donner of the Netherlands in crushing style after only 20 moves. It remains his best known game:

Liu Wenzhe—Donner, Buenos Aires Olympiad, 1978. Pirc Defence (ECO B07)
1.e4 d6 2.d4 Nf6 3.Nc3 g6 4.Be2 Bg7 5.g4 h6 6.h3 c5 7.d5 O-O? 8.h4 e6 9.g5 hxg5 10.hxg5 Ne8 11.Qd3 exd5 12.Nxd5 Nc6 13.Qg3 Be6 14.Qh4 f5 15.Qh7+ Kf7 (diagram) 16.Qxg6+! Kxg6 17.Bh5+ Kh7 18.Bf7+ Bh6 19.g6+ Kg7 20.Bxh6+ 1-0

In total, Liu made three appearances at the Chess Olympiads (1978–1982) with an overall record of 37 games played (+14, =4, -19). He also made four appearances in total at the Men's Asian Team Chess Championship (1979–1981, 1991–1993) with an overall record of 17 games played (+10, =4, -3).

In 1986 he was appointed to the post of Chief Trainer of the Chinese Institute of Chess and head coach of the Chinese national chess team. He was succeeded by Ye Jiangchuan in 2000.

In 2002-3, he wrote a seminal book on the "Chinese School of Chess" called the same name (see Further reading). In the book he charts the dramatic progress of Chinese players over the past 25 years. The books also highlighted training methods that the Chinese chess players have been deploying successfully.

== Quotes ==
"Systematically training players is more important than selecting them."—Liu Wenzhe, head coach, women's Chinese Olympic team.

== See also ==
- Chess in China

Preceded by Li Zunian	Men's Chinese Chess Champion; 1980	Succeeded by Ye Jiangchuan
Preceded by Ye Jiangchuan	Men's Chinese Chess Champion; 1982	Succeeded by Xu Jun
