= Bolat Asanov =

Kazakhstani chess grandmaster (born 1961)

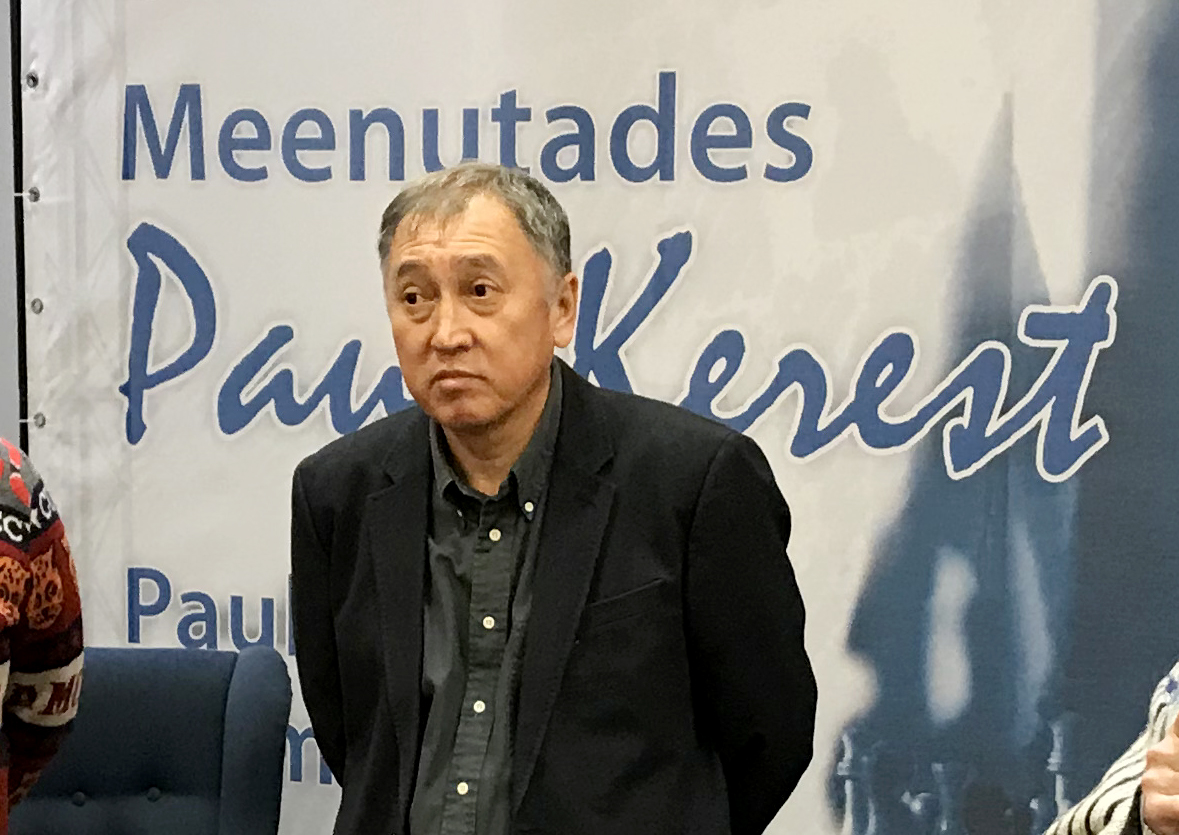
- Asanov in 2023

Personal information
- Native name: Болат Асанов
- Born: May 7, 1961 (age 65)

Chess career
- Country: Kazakhstan
- Title: Grandmaster (1994)
- FIDE rating: 2404 (November 2026)
- Peak rating: 2505 (January 1995)

Bolat Kärışalūly Asanov (Note: Often transliterated as Bolat Karishaluly Assanov through a Russified Romanization of Болат Каришалулы Асанов.) (Kazakh: Болат Кәрішалұлы Асанов; born 7 May 1961) is a Kazakh chess grandmaster and writer. A son of Karishal Asanov, Soviet-Kazakhstani dissident, Kazakhstan's independence fighter, he is author of a book "The Championship Diary", published in Tallinn, Estonia in 2023. Asanov was a member of the FIDE Central Committee (1994–1998), FIDE representative to the International Olympic Committee (IOC) (2006–2008).

In 1995, in Paris, during the FIDE Congress, Bolat Assanov played a key role in the decision of FIDE President Florencio Campomanes to resign and endorse Kirsan Ilyumzhinov as his successor to the FIDE presidency.

Asanov, being a candidate of historical sciences, on July 15, 2005, achieved that the Institute of Military History of the Ministry of Defence of Russia officially confirmed the fact of hoisting the red flag on the Reichstag Building in Berlin on April 30, 1945 by Lieutenant Rakhimzhan Koshkarbayev and Private Grigory Bulatov. For this purpose, on 7 May 2005, Bolat Asanov addressed a letter to the President of Russia Vladimir Putin.

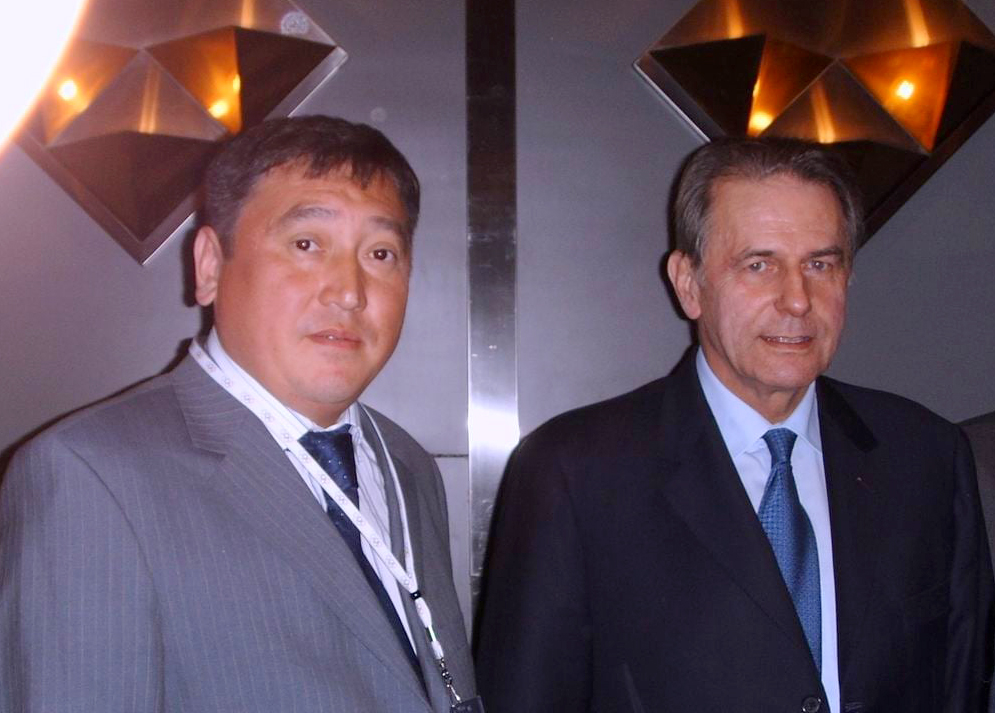
Bolat Asanov and Jacques Jean Marie Rogge, Beijing, 2006
