= Li Zunian =

Chinese chess player (born 1958)

Personal information
- Born: January 8, 1958 (age 68) Shanghai, China

Chess career
- Country: China
- Title: International Master (1983)
- FIDE rating: 2378 (April 2005)
- Peak rating: 2413 (July 2000)

Li Zunian (Chinese: 李祖年; born January 8, 1958) is a Chinese International Master chess player. He was the Chinese National Chess Champion in 1979.

Li made competed for the China national chess team with four appearances at the Chess Olympiads (1980–1986) with an overall record of 49 games played (+15, =21, -13). He also made four appearances in total at the Men's Asian Team Chess Championship (1979–1983, 1987) with an overall record of 29 games played (+23, =2, -4); and one appearance at the World Men's Team Chess Championship in 1985 with 8 games played (+0, =5, −3).

Li was banned from representing China in 1987 after a cheating scandal at a zonal tournament where he was forced to lose two games (and win one) and made his displeasure at the situation obvious.

== China Chess League ==
Li Zunian played for Sichuan chess club in the China Chess League (CCL).

== See also ==
- Chess in China

Preceded by Qi Jingxuan	Men's Chinese Chess Champion; 1979	Succeeded by Liu Wenzhe
