= Lê Thanh Tú =

Vietnamese chess player (born 1985)

Personal information
- Born: 27 November 1985 (age 40)

Chess career
- Country: Vietnam
- Title: Woman Grandmaster (2008)
- Peak rating: 2344 (November 2009)

Lê Thanh Tú (born 27 November 1985) is a Vietnamese chess player who holds the title of Woman Grandmaster. She won the Vietnamese Women's Chess Championship in 2008.

== Biography ==
In 2007, in Tehran ranked the 5th place in the Asian Women's Chess Championship. In this same year she won in the East Asian Zone Women's Chess Tournament. In 2008, she won the Vietnamese Women's Chess Championship and participated in Women's World Chess Championship 2008 in Nalchik, where she lost Anna Ushenina in the first round.

Played for Vietnam on two Women's Chess Olympiads (2006-2008) and at the Women's World Team Chess Championship in 2007. In the Asian Women's Team championships participated three times (2005—2009) where in the team competition she won two gold medals (2005, 2009) and a bronze medal (2008). In the women's team chess tournament at Asian Indoor Games participated in 2009.

In 2007, she was awarded the FIDE Woman International Master (WIM) title and received the FIDE Woman Grandmaster (WGM) title year later.
