= Bùi Vinh =

Vietnamese chess grandmaster (born 1976)

Personal information
- Born: 25 December 1976 (age 49) Hanoi, Vietnam

Chess career
- Country: Vietnam
- Title: Grandmaster (2008)
- Peak rating: 2522 (April 2009)

Bùi Vinh (born 25 December 1976) is a Vietnamese chess grandmaster. He was awarded the title of International Master in 2002 and the title of grandmaster in 2008. His peak FIDE rating was 2522, reached in April 2009.

== Career ==
Bùi won the Vietnamese National Chess Championship in 2003, defeating Đào Thiên Hải in the final round, and won the title again in 2009.

Bùi completed his grandmaster title in Hungary in 2008, and became increasingly active as a trainer and organiser in Vietnamese chess. In 2014 he founded the Future Grandmasters Chess Club in Hanoi, and from 2022 he began organising GM and IM norm tournaments in Hanoi and Quảng Ninh.

He also qualified as a FIDE Arbiter in 2021 and an International Arbiter in 2023, while remaining a licensed FIDE Trainer.
