= Edhi Handoko =

Indonesian chess player

Personal information
- Born: August 28, 1960 Surakarta, Indonesia
- Died: February 17, 2009 (aged 48) Bogor, Indonesia

Chess career
- Country: Indonesia
- Title: Grandmaster (1994)
- Peak rating: 2520 (July 1993)

Edhi Handoko (August 28, 1960 – February 17, 2009) was an Indonesian chess player. He won the Indonesian Chess Championship in 1978, 1980, 1984 and 1991. Handoko earned the National Master title in 1978, before progressing to both FIDE Master and International Master in 1982. He subsequently became Indonesia's fourth grandmaster in 1994 with an Elo rating of 2520. In 2003 he won the men's masters tournament at the inaugural Japfa Chess Festival in Jakarta. Handoko played in the Indonesian national team in the Chess Olympiad and the Asian Team Chess Championship.

Handoko died at the age of 48 on February 17, 2009, at the Cibinong Hospital in Bogor, following a heart attack.
