= Chen De =

Chinese chess player (born 1949)

Personal information
- Born: November 26, 1949 (age 76)

Chess career
- Country: China
- Title: FIDE Master (1989)
- Peak rating: 2361 (July 2000)

Chen De (Chinese: 陈德; born 26 November 1949) is a Chinese FIDE master chess player.

Chen De plays for the Guangdong chess club in the China Chess League (CCL).

== National championships ==
In 1974 and 1977, Chen De won the Chinese Chess Championship.

== National team ==
He was a member of the Chinese national chess team. He competed at the Chess Olympiad in 1978, the first time China competed. This was his only appearance at this prestigious event, and he played 9 games in total, scoring 1 win, 3 draws and 5 losses.

Chen also competed for the national team at the Men's Asian Team Chess Championship (the most prestigious team chess tournament in Asia) three times between 1977 and 1981. He played 17 games in all, scoring 12 wins, 3 draws and 2 losses.

== International arbiter ==
In July 2004, he qualified for the title of International Arbiter.

== See also ==
- Chess in China

Preceded by Zhang Donglu (1966)	Men's Chinese Chess Champion; 1974	Succeeded by Qi Jingxuan
Preceded by Qi Jingxuan	Men's Chinese Chess Champion; 1977	Succeeded by Qi Jingxuan
