= Qi Jingxuan =

Chinese chess player (born 1947)

Personal information
- Born: November 9, 1947 (age 78) Zhenhai, Ningbo, Zhejiang, China

Chess career
- Country: China
- Title: International Master (1981)
- FIDE rating: 2435 (July 2026)
- Peak rating: 2443 (July 2000)

Qi Jingxuan (Chinese: 戚惊萱, pinyin Qī Jīngxuān; born 9 November 1947) is a Chinese chess player, who holds the title International Master. He won the Chinese Chess Championship In 1975 and 1978.

In 1985, Qi competed in the Interzonal tournament in Taxco, Mexico. He scored 6½ points in a field of 16 players, finishing in 11th place. He was the first male Chinese player to progress to the Interzonal level of the World Championship.

Qi was a member of the Chinese national chess team. He was part of the national team at the Chess Olympiad three times in 1978-1980, 1984. He played a total of 38 games scoring 16 wins, 12 draws and 10 losses.

He also competed once at the World Team Chess Championship (1985) having played a total of 8 games (1 wins, 3 draws, 4 losses); and four times at the Asian Team Chess Championship (1977–1983) having played 31 games (18 wins, 7 draws, 6 losses).

Qi plays for the Guangdong chess club in the China Chess League (CCL).

== See also ==
- Chess in China

Preceded by Chen De	Men's Chinese Chess Champion; 1975	Succeeded by Chen De
Preceded by Chen De	Men's Chinese Chess Champion; 1978	Succeeded by Li Zunian
