= Glenn Bordonada =

Filipino chess player

Personal information
- Born: Glenn Guillermo Bordonada; 25 June 1951 (age 75)

Chess career
- Country: Philippines
- Peak rating: 2385 (January 1982)

Glenn Bordonada (born 25 June 1951), is a Filipino chess player, Chess Olympiad individual gold medal winner (1978), three-times Asian Team Chess Championships gold medal winner (1974, 1977, 1979).

== Biography ==
In the 1970s Glenn Bordonada was one of the leading Filipino chess players. In 1975, in Melbourne he participated in the Asian Zonal Chess Tournament of the World Chess Championship.

Glenn Bordonada played for Philippines in the Chess Olympiads:

- In 1974, at first reserve board in the 21st Chess Olympiad in Nice (+6, =2, -5),
- In 1978, at fourth board in the 23rd Chess Olympiad in Buenos Aires (+5, =4, -0) and won individual gold medal.

Glenn Bordonada played for Philippines in the Men's Asian Team Chess Championships:

- In 1974, at third board in the 1st Asian Team Chess Championship in Penang (+2, =2, -1) and won team gold and individual bronze medals,
- In 1977, at third board in the 2nd Asian Team Chess Championship in Auckland (+7, =1, -0) and won team gold and individual gold medals,
- In 1979, at third board in the 3rd Asian Team Chess Championship in Singapore (+3, =3, -0) and won team gold and individual silver medal.

Glenn Bordonada is also known as a chess journalist in the Philippine press. From the first half of the 1980s he has rarely participated in chess tournaments.
