= Ruben Rodríguez (chess player) =

Filipino chess player (1946–1995)

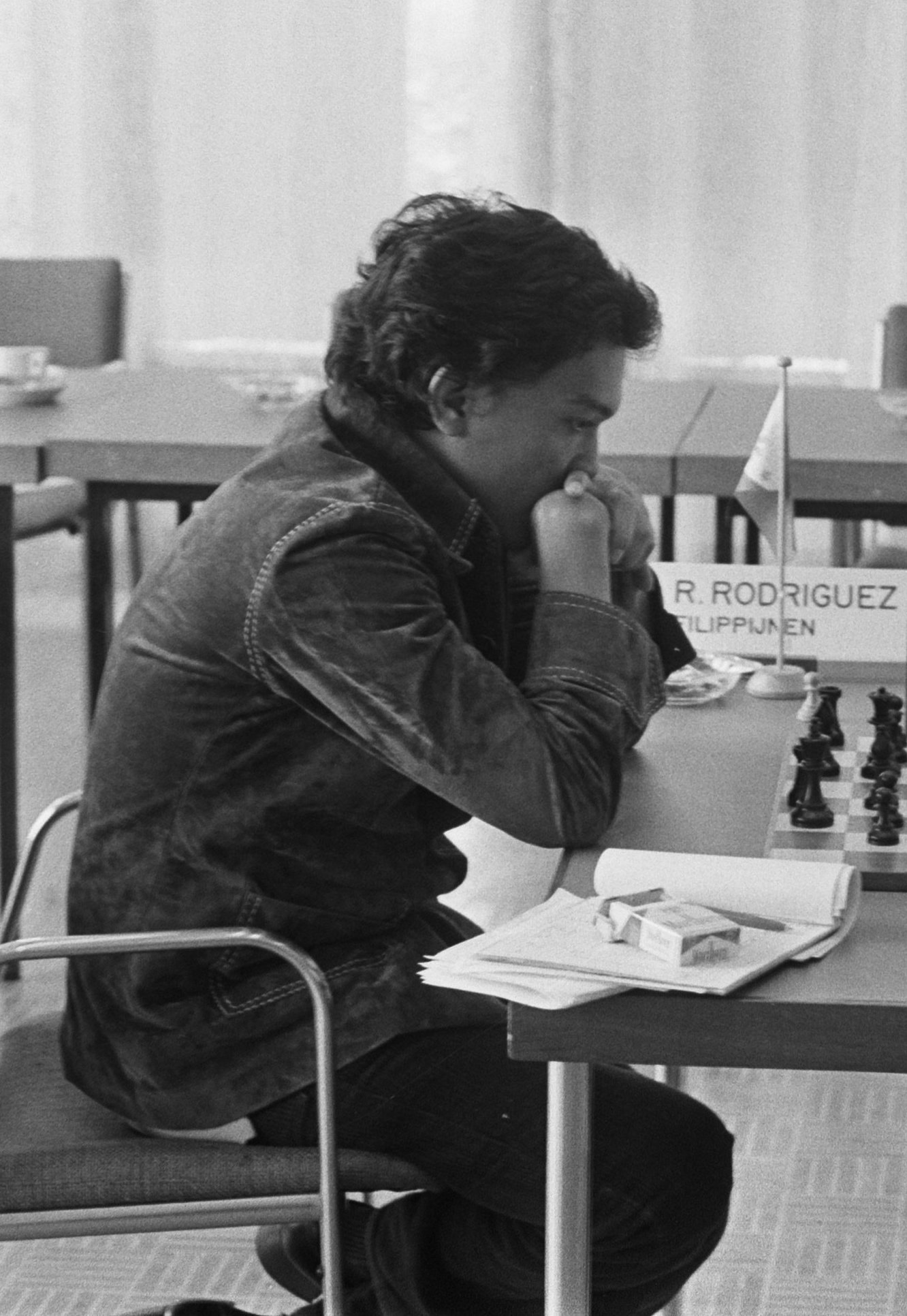
- Rodríguez in Amsterdam in 1975

Personal information
- Born: 7 December 1946
- Died: 1995

Chess career
- Country: Philippines
- Title: International Master (1978)
- Peak rating: 2445 (January 1994)

Ruben Rodríguez (7 December 1946 — 1995), was a Filipino chess International Master (IM) (1978), Asian Team Chess Championship winner (1979, 1981). He earned the title of International Master (IM) in 1978, a recognition of his strong skills and dedication to chess.

Rodríguez was not only a talented individual player but also a valuable team member. He represented the Philippines in the Asian Team Chess Championships, where he helped his country secure victories in 1979 and again in 1981. His achievements during this period contributed to raising the profile of Philippine chess on the international stage. Although his life was cut short in 1995, his contributions and successes remain a source of pride in the Filipino chess community.

== Biography ==
In the 1960s and 1970s Ruben Rodríguez was one of the strongest Filipino chess players. In 1973, in Chicago he shared 1st - 5th place in U.S. Open Chess Championship with Norman Weinstein, Walter Browne, Duncan Suttles, and Greg DeFotis. For a long time Ruben Rodríguez was considered the Philippines' best blitz player.

Ruben Rodríguez two times participated in the World Chess Championship Interzonal Tournaments:

- In 1979, at Interzonal Tournament in Riga ranked 18th place;
- In 1981, at Interzonal Tournament in Moscow ranked 13th place.

Ruben Rodríguez played for Philippines in the Chess Olympiad:

- In 1968, at second reserve board in the 18th Chess Olympiad in Lugano (+5, =2, -3),
- In 1970, at third board in the 19th Chess Olympiad in Siegen (+7, =7, -1),
- In 1972, at third board in the 20th Chess Olympiad in Skopje (+8, =4, -5),
- In 1976, at third board in the 22nd Chess Olympiad in Haifa (+1, =1, -4),
- In 1978, at second board in the 23rd Chess Olympiad in Buenos Aires (+2, =5, -3),
- In 1980, at third board in the 24th Chess Olympiad in La Valletta (+2, =2, -5),
- In 1986, at second board in the 27th Chess Olympiad in Dubai (+3, =5, -4),
- In 1988, at third board in the 28th Chess Olympiad in Thessaloniki (+2, =3, -4),
- In 1992, at first board for Philippines-3 team in the 30th Chess Olympiad in Manila (+6, =3, -3).

Ruben Rodríguez played for Philippines in the World Student Team Chess Championship:

- In 1969, at first board in the 16th World Student Team Chess Championship in Dresden (+5, =2, -6).

Ruben Rodríguez played for Philippines in the Men's Asian Team Chess Championships:

- In 1979, at third board in the 3rd Asian Team Chess Championship in Singapore (+5, =1, -1) and won team gold medal,
- In 1981, at reserve board in the 4th Asian Team Chess Championship in Hangzhou (+2, =1, -0) and won team gold medal,
- In 1991, at fourth board in the 9th Asian Team Chess Championship in Penang (+5, =0, -2) and won team silver medal,
- In 1993, at reserve board in the 10th Asian Team Chess Championship in Kuala Lumpur (+2, =2, -1) and won team bronze medal.
