= Ricardo de Guzman =

Filipino chess player (born 1961)

Personal information
- Born: September 12, 1961 (age 64)

Chess career
- Country: Philippines
- Title: International Master (1982)
- Peak rating: 2439 (January 2004)

Ricardo de Guzman (born September 12, 1961) is a Filipino chess player. He was one of the premiere players of the Philippines in the 1980s and was awarded the title of International Master in 1982. He is nationally ranked 39th in the Philippines, 22nd among active players. He reached a peak rating of 2439 but currently has a classical ELO rating of 2344, rapid rating of 2261 (peak rating was 2376 in January 2019) and blitz rating of 2363 (peak rating was 2405 in July 2014 – December 2018) per FIDE.

== Chess career ==
=== Asian Junior Chess Championship ===
De Guzman won the prestigious Asian Junior Chess Championship in 1981 held at Dhaka, Bangladesh where he was awarded an outright IM title. He actually finished in a tie with GM Niaz Murshed of Bangladesh but won the title based on a superior tiebreak as he had more wins than Murshed.

=== Chess Olympiad ===
De Guzman participated in three (3) Olympiads:

- 23rd Chess Olympiad conducted at Buenos Aires, Argentina in 1978 where he played the 2nd Reserve Board as an unranked player. He contributed 1.0/5 winning 1 and losing 4 games for a 20.0% winning rate and 2028 Tournament Performance Rating (TPR). The team placed 24th in this edition of the Olympiad.
- 26th Chess Olympiad held at Thessaloniki, Greece in 1984 where he played Board 3 and scored 4½ points in 8 games. He had 2 wins, 5 draws and 1 loss for a winning rate of 56.3% and a TPR of 2374 as compared to his 2355 ELO rating at that time. The team placed 16th in this Olympiad.
- 30th Chess Olympiad held at Manila, Philippines in 1992 where he was Team Philippines' Board 4 player. He recorded 3 points out of 8 games registering 1 win, 4 draws and 3 losses for a low 37.5% winning rate with a TPR of 2257 as compared to his ELO rating of 2390. The team ended up in 31st place.

He ended his Olympiad career with a 8½ points in 21 games, recording 4 wins, 9 draws and 8 losses for a winning rate of 40.5%.

=== World Chess Championship ===
He participated in the World Chess Championship cycle 1998-1999 through the Zonal 3.2a held in Yangon, Myanmar in 1998 where he tied for 21st-25th places eventually copping 21st place after tiebreaks. He scored 3½ points in 9 games posting 2 wins, 3 draws and 4 losses where he had a 2162 TPR as against his ELO rating of 2400 at that time. It was not enough to qualify for the Interzonals held in 1999 at Las Vegas.

=== Asian Team Chess Championship ===
De Guzman was a 4-time participant in the Asian Team Chess Championship:

Event	Board	ELO	Record	Winning %	Individual result	Rank	TPR	Team result
New Delhi Asian Team Chess Championship (5th) 1983	4th	2300	+5 =3 -1	72.2%	6.5/9	Silver	2418	Silver
Dubai Asian Team Chess Championship (6th) 1986	4th	2385	+5 =1 -1	78.6%	5.5/7	Silver	2496	Gold
Genting Highlands Asian Team Chess Championship (8th) 1989	2nd	2350	+5 =2 -2	66.7%	6.0/9	Fourth	2568	Fourth
Singapore Asian Team Chess Championship (11th) 1995	4th	2400	+4 =0 -1	80.0%	4.0/5	Gold	2376	Gold

He finished his stint in the Asian Team Chess Championship with an outstanding total of 22 points in 30 games posting 19 wins, 6 draws and 5 losses for a winning rate of 73.3% garnering 6 medals in total: 1 gold and 2 silvers in Individual Play and 2 golds and 1 silver in Team Competitions.

=== Philippine Chess Championship ===
De Guzman participated in the Filipino Chess Championship various times:

Year	Event	ELO	Rank
2016	Philippine Chess Championship	2364	27th
2019	Philippine Chess Championship	2362	10th

=== Other significant tournaments ===
==== Bob Burger Open ====
In January 2002, de Guzman won the Bob Burger Open held on January 5, beating SM David Pruess and NM Michael Aigner.

On January 17, 2004, de Guzman won the Bob Burger Open with a perfect score of 5/5.

On January 9, 2010, de Guzman won the 10th Bob Burger Open conducted at the Mechanics Institute, San Francisco, California, USA where he scored 4.5/5.

==== Other US tournaments ====
De Guzman won the 2004 Sacramento Chess Championship over the 4th of July weekend going undefeated and scoring 5.0/6 (4 wins and 2 draws).

De Guzman won the 2010 Dolan Memorial International Chess tournament held in San Francisco, California on October 9, 2010.

In 2014, de Guzman won the 5th Central California Open held from August 15–17, 2014 in Fresno, California after he scored 4.5/5.

That year, De Guzman took part also in the US Class Championship, which took place from October 31 to November 2 in Santa Clara, California. He ended up in a tie for 2nd place with IM Sevillano both ending up with 4.5/6 and each earned US$803.00 in the tournament won by GM Cristian Chirila.

De Guzman participated also in the 2014 North American Open won by SGM So with 8.0/9 (+7 =2 -0) held from December 26–30, 2014. He wound up in a tie for 37-47th places all with 4.5 points although he only played 8 games recording 3 wins, 3 draws and 2 losses.

In 2015, de Guzman joined the 2nd Millionaire Chess Open held from October 8–12, 2015 and won by Super GM Wesley So of the US. He had a starting rank of 69 but placed 108 overall after scoring 3.5 points in 9 games recording 2 wins, 3 draws and 4 losses with a TPR of 2285 as against his 2374 ELO.

==== Asian Seniors 50+ Division ====
In the finals of the Asian Seniors 50+ division, de Guzman placed 4th overall in the tournament.

== Achievements ==
Date	Event	Venue	Rank
1978	Chess Olympiad Member	Buenos Aires, Argentina	----
1981	Asian Junior Championship	Dhaka, Bangladesh	First Place
1983	Asian Team Championship	New Delhi, India	Second Place
1984	Chess Olympiad Member	Thessaloniki, Greece	----
1985	Asian Masters Championship	Singapore	First Place
1992	Chess Olympiad Member	Manila, Philippines	----
2002	Calchess State Championship	California, USA	First Place
2003	Vallejo Chess Championship	USA	First Place
2004	Pacific Coast Open	USA	Second Place
2006	Cal Classic Championship	California, USA	First Place
2010	Dolan Memorial International Chess	San Francisco	First Place
2010	Pafnutieff Open Chess Championship	San Francisco	First Place
2011	Sacramento Chess Championship	Sacramento	First Place
2013	Calchess State Championship	California, USA	First Place
2014	Fresno International Chess Tournament	California, USA	First Place
2019	PECA National Executive Open	Manila, Philippines	First Place
2019	National Executive Championships	Boracay, Aklan, Phils	Fifth Place
2020	PSC-NCFP Chess Championship	Quezon City, Philippines	Second Place
2020	Asian Senior Chess Qualifier 3.3 Zone	Online Manila	First Place
2020	Asian Senior Chess Championship	Online UAE	Fourth Place
