= Rogelio Barcenilla =

Filipino chess grandmaster (born 1972)

Personal information
- Born: Rogelio Barcenilla Jr. January 23, 1972 (age 54) Bacolod, Philippines

Chess career
- Country: Philippines
- Title: Grandmaster (2010)
- FIDE rating: 2467 (July 2026)
- Peak rating: 2518 (July 2009)

Rogelio Barcenilla Jr. (born January 23, 1972 in Bacolod, Philippines) is a Filipino chess Grandmaster. He was awarded the International Master title in 1990 and the Grandmaster title in 2010. Barcenilla won the Asian Junior Chess Championship two times, back-to-back in 1989 held at Dubai, United Arab Emirates (UAE) and in 1990 at Kerala, India.

Barcenilla has played five times in Chess Olympics: 28th Chess Olympiad (1988), 30th Chess Olympiad (1992), 32nd Chess Olympiad (1996), 42nd Chess Olympiad (2016) and 2020 Online Chess Olympiad.

== Notable tournaments ==
Tournament Name	Year	ELO	Points
ch-PHI 2019(Quezon City PHI)	2019	2451	7.0
Jack Collins Int f-A(New York)	2000	2495	3.0
Greenhills op(Greenhills)	1996	2445	7.0
Asian-ch U20(Asia)	1989	2355	11.5
