= Van der Giessen =

Van der Giessen is a Dutch surname. Notable people with the surname include:

- Ada van der Giessen (born 1948), Dutch chess master
- John van der Giessen (born 1982), American rugby union player
- Piet Jan van der Giessen (1918–1993), Dutch sailor

== See also ==
- Van der Giessen de Noord, a Dutch shipyard
