= José Camacho =

José Camacho may refer to:

- José Antonio Camacho (born 1955), Spanish footballer and manager
- Jose Camacho-Collados (born 1988), Welsh chess player and professor
- José Camacho (judoka) (born 1983), Venezuelan judoka
- Jose Camacho Tenorio (1923–1993), Chamorro businessman
- Jose Isidro Camacho (born 1955), Filipino banker and politician
