= Smilja Vujosevic =

Canadian chess player

Personal information
- Born: 9 June 1935 Ogar, Kingdom of Yugoslavia
- Died: 30 July 2016 (aged 81) Toronto, Ontario, Canada

Chess career
- Country: Yugoslavia; Canada
- Title: Woman International Master (1977)

Smilja Vujosevic (9 June 1935 – 30 July 2016) was a Canadian chess player who held the FIDE title of Woman International Master (WIM, 1977). She was a Canadian Women's Chess Championship winner (1975) and 7th Chess Olympiad (women) individual bronze medal winner (1976).

== Biography ==
Smilja Vujosevic was born in the northern Serbian village of Ogar.

Vujosevic was seriously involved in chess in Yugoslavia, where she participated in the Yugoslav team championships. She played for Partizan Belgrade team on woman's board. In 1967, Vujosevic arrived in Canada. She worked as bookkeeper. From the late 1970s to the mid-1990s, Vujosevic was one of Canada's leading chess players. In 1975, she won Canadian Women's Chess Championship, and in 1989 she won silver medal in this tournament. Vujosevic also showed best result among women in the Canadian Open Chess Championship six times (1970, 1973, 1976, 1988, 1991, 1993). In 1976, she participated in the Tbilisi Interzonal tournament, from which she left after the 5th round.

Vujosevic played for Canada in the Women's Chess Olympiads:

- In 1974, at first board in the 6th Chess Olympiad (women) in Medellín (+3, =3, -5),
- In 1976, at first board in the 7th Chess Olympiad (women) in Haifa (+6, =3, -2) and won individual bronze medal,
- In 1990, at first board in the 29th Chess Olympiad (women) in Novi Sad (+4, =2, -5),
- In 1992, at first reserve board in the 30th Chess Olympiad (women) in Manila (+2, =3, -4),
- In 1994, at first reserve board in the 31st Chess Olympiad (women) in Moscow (+2, =1, -5).

In 1977, she received the FIDE Woman International Master (WIM) title. In 2018, Vujosevic was posthumously admitted to the Canadian Chess Hall of Fame.
