= 22nd Chess Olympiad =

1976 chess tournament in Haifa, Israel

Stamp allusive to the Olympiad

The 22nd Chess Olympiad (Hebrew: אולימפיאדת השחמט ה-22, Olimpiada ha-shachmat ha-22), organized by FIDE, took place between October 26 and November 10, 1976, in Haifa, Israel. For the first time, the event comprised both an open and a women's tournament.

Another first was the change in format. The growing number of teams (74 at the previous Olympiad) had made it impossible to continue with the previous system of round-robin preliminary and final groups, so beginning in Haifa, the open event was played as a Swiss system tournament (the women's event had fewer participants and did not use the Swiss system until 1980).

The first Swiss system Olympiad ended up with significantly fewer teams, however. International politics once again interfered in the world of sports, as many FIDE member nations withdrew in protest against the Olympiad being held in Israel, a country many of them didn't recognize. Among the nations that stayed away from Haifa were all of the Arab countries, some of which took part in the alternative Against Chess Olympiad instead. Other absentees were the entire Eastern Bloc, including most of the usual medal candidates. A number of Eastern European players had recently defected, however, and now represented various Western countries.

In the absence of the Soviet Union, Yugoslavia, and Hungary, the US team had the highest average rating and had to be considered favourites, even without Bobby Fischer. In the end, they lived up to expectations and won the gold medals, by half a point. The Netherlands and England took home the silver and bronze, respectively.

== Open event ==
Forty-eight nations played 13 rounds. In the event of a draw, the tie-break was decided first by match points, then by using the Buchholz system.

Open event
#	Country	Players	Average rating	Points	MP	Buchholz
1	United States	Byrne, Kavalek, Evans, Tarjan, Lombardy, Commons	2535	37		
2	Netherlands	Timman, Sosonko, Donner, Ree, Ligterink, Kuijpers	2490	36½		
3	England	Miles, Keene, Hartston, Stean, Mestel, Nunn	2463	35½		
4	Argentina	Najdorf, Panno, Quinteros, Sanguineti, Szmetan, Bronstein	2513	33		
5	West Germany	Unzicker, Pachman, Kestler, Mohrlok, Ostermeyer, Wockenfuss	2485	31		
6	Israel	Liberzon, Kraidman, Dzindzichashvili, Lederman, Kagan, Birnboim	2490	29½		
7	Switzerland	Hug, Lombard, Wirthensohn, Huss, Hammer, Ott	2391	29		
8	Canada	Biyiasas, Day, Yanofsky, Amos, Lipnowski, Piasetski	2428	28½	15	
9	Spain	Pomar, Bellón López, Martín González, Medina García, Sanz Alonso, Ochoa	2399	28½	12	
10	Colombia	Cuartas, Castro, Minaya Molano, García, de Greiff, Silva	2365	28		
11	Norway	Øgaard, Hoen, Helmers, Hjertenes, Knudsen, Tiller	2331	27½	16	
12	Sweden	Andersson, Ornstein, Jansson, Schüssler, Wahlbom, Schneider	2453	27½	15	376.5
13	Italy	Tatai, Toth, Grinza, Micheli, Paoli, Taruffi	2385	27½	15	361.5
14	Wales	Botterill, Williams, Hutchings, Cooper, Jones, Rayner	2355	27½	15	359.0
15	Paraguay	Franco Ocampos, Gamarra Cáceres, Bogda, Ferreira, Pane L., Ingolotti	2216	27½	14	
16	Chile	Silva Sánchez, Donoso Velasco, Frias Pablaza, Scholz Solis, Velasquez Ojeda, Godoy Bugueño	2356	27½	13	380.5
17	Australia	Jamieson, Fuller, Shaw, Rubanraut, Woodhams, Kellner	2390	27½	13	367.5
18	Austria	Robatsch, Dückstein, Hölzl, Janetschek, Wittmann, Röhrl	2405	27½	13	366.0
19	Finland	Westerinen, Rantanen, Raaste, Kanko, Saren, Vahtera	2374	27½	13	346.5
20	Philippines	Torre, Balinas, Rodríguez, Mascariñas, Caturla, Estimo	2418	27	17	
21	New Zealand	Chandler, Green, Small, Smith, Cornford, Leonhardt	2216	27	15	
22	Iceland	Sigurjónsson, Ólafsson H., Thorsteinsson, Sólmundarson, Pétursson, Víglundsson	2426	27	13	
23	Venezuela	Ostos, Palacios, Díaz, Sánchez, Schorr, Cúellar	2275	26½	13	
24	Belgium	Rooze, De Bruycker, Beyen, Van Seters, Mollekens, Schumacher	2326	26½	11	
25	Denmark	Rath, Øst-Hansen, Kølbæk, Rosenlund, Rosell, Mortensen	2340	26½	10	
26	France	Haïk, Preissmann, Puhm, Seret, Goldenberg, Letzelter	2320	26	14	351.0
27	Dominican Republic	Myers, Columna, Carrión, González, Malagón, Pérez	2200	26	14	300.5
28	Uruguay	Benítez, Bademian Orchanian, Ricetto, Silva Nazzari, Diano, Dienavorian Lacherian	2203	26	13	
29	Honduras	Lozano, Aguilar, Rivera, Padilla, Luque, Becerra	2200	26	9	
30	Thailand	Darakorn, Sinprayoon, Rasmussen, Sa-ngadsup, Trisa-Ard, Vajrabhaya S.	2200	25½	12	
31	Iran	Sharif, Harandi, Shirazi, Mamouri, Safarzadeh, Saloor	2303	25½	11	367.5
32	Costa Rica	Vaglio Muñoz, Gutiérrez Mangel, Jiménez Molina, Salas Leal, Chaves, Sobrado	2200	25½	11	324.0
33	Scotland	Pritchett, Levy, Jamieson, Findlay, Swanson, Bonner	2321	25½	10	
34	Guernsey	Browning, Blow, Whetton, Lainé, Denning, Taylor	2200	25	14	
35	Ireland	Kernan, Ludgate, Doyle, Keogh, Kennefick, Delaney	2214	25	12	
36	Luxembourg	Stull, Feller, Schammo, Schneider, Philippe, Milbers	2250	24½	13	
37	Guatemala	Pérez, Batres, Deras Díaz, Cote, Garrido, Larios	2200	24½	12	321.0
38	Japan	Hamada, Kuroda, Sakurai, Tatsutomi, Kanai A., Ozaki	2200	24½	12	296.0
39	Hong Kong	Kan Wai Shui, Lo Y. Cheong, Sin Kuen, Ko Chi, Lam, Pang C. K.	2245	24½	12	291.5
40	Bolivia	Ramírez, Calle, Suarez S., García M., Rivas, Mendes J.	2200	24½	11	
41	Bermuda	Yerbury, Radford, Reichgeld, McDaniels, Marks, Jensen	2200	24		
42	Andorra	Gómez Abad, De la Casa, Martínez, Guijarro, Tarradellas	2200	23		
43	Monaco	Angles d'Auriac, Martelli R., Cary A., Negro, Kostjoerin, Lepine	2200	22		
44	Faroe Islands	Petersen, Mikkelsen, Midjord, Ellefsen H., Petersen K., Thomassen J.	2201	21½		
45	Papua New Guinea	Rush, Markov, Earle M., Nacino T., Bluett N., Bell G.	2200	18		
46	United States Virgin Islands	Abraham, Hoyt, Rumsch, Grumer, Hanno, Levenson G.	2200	15½		
47	British Virgin Islands	Hook, Georges, Pickering, Campbell, Linhart G., Corbin	2203	13½		
48	Netherlands Antilles	Martina, Croes, Booi O., Brunk C., Tjinkamjet A.	2200	7½		

=== Team standing ===
The following ratings were used to determine the placement (#).

- BP (sum of board points)
- TP (sum of team points)
- Rtg (Buchholz scoring system)

#	Team	Code	BP	TP	Rtg	+	=	-	1	2	3	4	5	6	7	8	9	10	11	12	13
1	United States	USA	37	21	383.5	9	3	1	IRI; 3	CHI; 2½	SCO; 3½	ITA; 2	AUS; 4	NED; 1½	ENG; 2	ARG; 2½	GER; 2	ISR; 3½	SUI; 4	COL; 3	WLS; 3½
2	Netherlands	NED	36½	23	383.5	10	3	0	LUX; 3½	SCO; 2½	SUI; 2½	ARG; 2	NOR; 4	USA; 2½	ISR; 3	ENG; 2	CHI; 3½	SWE; 3½	GER; 2	CAN; 2½	FIN; 3
3	England	ENG	35½	22	385.5	9	4	0	NZL; 2½	FRA; 4	ARG; 2½	GER; 2	ITA; 3	PHI; 3½	USA; 2	NED; 2	ISR; 2	CAN; 3	SWE; 3	CHI; 3½	AUT; 2½
4	Argentina	ARG	33	20	389.5	9	2	2	VEN; 4	ESP; 2½	ENG; 1½	NED; 2	SUI; 3	GER; 2½	PHI; 3	USA; 1½	IRI; 3	AUT; 3	ISR; 2½	SWE; 2½	CAN; 2
5	West Germany	GER	31	15	389.0	6	3	4	IRL; 3½	FIN; 3	AUT; 3½	ENG; 2	PHI; 1	ARG; 1½	ESP; 3	ISR; 1½	USA; 2	IRI; 4	NED; 2	SUI; 1½	AUS; 2½
6	Israel	ISR	29½	17	392.5	8	1	4	URU; 3½	AUS; 2½	SWE; 2½	SUI; 1½	DEN; 3½	ESP; 3	NED; 1	GER; 2½	ENG; 2	USA ½	ARG; 1½	PHI; 3	PAR; 2½
7	Switzerland	SUI	29	17	365.0	8	1	4	AHO; 4	CAN; 2½	NED; 1½	ISR; 2½	ARG; 1	CHI ½	DEN; 2½	THA; 3½	ESP; 2	COL; 3	USA; 0	GER; 2½	FRA; 3½
8	Canada	CAN	28½	15	372.5	6	3	4	MNC; 4	SUI; 1½	NOR; 1	IRI; 2½	SCO; 2	WLS; 3	ITA; 2	ESP; 2½	AUS; 2½	ENG; 1	ISL; 3	NED; 1½	ARG; 2
9	Spain	ESP	28½	12	355.0	5	2	6	ISV; 4	ARG; 1½	BEL; 2½	SWE; 2	VEN; 4	ISR; 1	GER; 1	CAN; 1½	SUI; 2	CHI; 1½	NOR; 2½	AUS; 1½	SCO; 3½
10	Colombia	COL	28	14	352.5	6	2	5	PNG; 3½	SWE; 1½	ISL; 2½	VEN; 1½	FIN; 1½	PAR; 2	FRA; 3	SCO; 2½	NOR; 2	SUI; 1	AUT; 3	USA; 1	HON; 3
11	Norway	NOR	27½	16	362.5	6	4	3	THA; 2½	HON; 3½	CAN; 3	PHI; 1½	NED; 0	FIN; 2½	PAR; 2½	AUT; 2	COL; 2	ISL; 2	ESP; 1½	DEN; 2	VEN; 2½
12	Sweden	SWE	27½	15	376.5	7	1	5	DOM; 3½	COL; 2½	ISR; 1½	ESP; 2	AUT; 2½	SCO; 2½	CHI; 2½	IRI; 1	PHI; 4	NED ½	ENG; 1	ARG; 1½	DEN; 2½
13	Italy	ITA	27½	15	361.5	5	5	3	AND; 4	ISL; 3	PHI; 2	USA; 2	ENG; 1	IRI; 2	CAN; 2	CHI ½	IRL; 2½	AUS; 1½	FRA; 2½	SCO; 2	BEL; 2½
14	Wales	WLS	27½	15	359.0	6	3	4	HON; 2	NZL; 2	LUX; 1½	PAR; 2	URU; 4	CAN; 1	VEN; 2½	AUS; 1	BEL; 3	FIN; 2½	CHI; 2½	ISL; 3	USA ½
15	Paraguay	PAR	27½	14	345.0	6	2	5	FRA; 1	CRC; 2½	NZL; 2½	WLS; 2	LUX; 2½	COL; 2	NOR; 1½	BEL; 2½	URU; 2½	PHI; 1½	SCO; 1½	BOL; 4	ISR; 1½
16	Chile	CHI	27½	13	380.5	6	1	6	CRC; 3	USA; 1½	AUS; 2	URU; 3	ISL; 1½	SUI; 3½	SWE; 1½	ITA; 3½	NED ½	ESP; 2½	WLS; 1½	ENG ½	IRI; 3
17	Australia	AUS	27½	13	367.5	6	1	6	JPN; 4	ISR; 1½	CHI; 2	BEL; 4	USA; 0	ISL; 2½	IRI; 1	WLS; 3	CAN; 1½	ITA; 2½	PHI; 1½	ESP; 2½	GER; 1½
18	Austria	AUT	27½	13	366.0	6	1	6	GCI; 4	BEL; 2½	GER ½	FIN; 2½	SWE; 1½	DEN; 3	ISL; 1½	NOR; 2	SCO; 2½	ARG; 1	COL; 1	CRC; 4	ENG; 1½
19	Finland	FIN	27½	13	346.5	6	1	6	IVB; 3½	GER; 1	DEN; 2½	AUT; 1½	COL; 2½	NOR; 1½	SCO; 2	BOL; 2½	ISL; 1½	WLS; 1½	LUX; 3	NZL; 3½	NED; 1
20	Philippines	PHI	27	17	367.5	8	1	4	FAI; 4	DEN; 3	ITA; 2	NOR; 2½	GER; 3	ENG ½	ARG; 1	ISL; 2½	SWE; 0	PAR; 2½	AUS; 2½	ISR; 1	URU; 2½
21	New Zealand	NZL	27	15	346.5	7	1	5	ENG; 1½	WLS; 2	PAR; 1½	CRC; 3	BEL; 1	DOM; 2½	LUX; 1½	JPN; 2½	DEN; 2½	IRL; 2½	THA; 3	FIN ½	GUA; 3
22	Iceland	ISL	27	13	350.0	6	1	6	HKG; 4	ITA; 1	COL; 1½	LUX; 3	CHI; 2½	AUS; 1½	AUT; 2½	PHI; 1½	FIN; 2½	NOR; 2	CAN; 1	WLS; 1	IRL; 3
23	Venezuela	VEN	26½	13	336.5	6	1	6	ARG; 0	PNG; 3½	MNC; 4	COL; 2½	ESP; 0	BEL; 2	WLS; 1½	URU ½	THA; 1	JPN; 3	GCI; 3½	LUX; 3½	NOR; 1½
24	Belgium	BEL	26½	11	341.5	4	3	6	GUA; 4	AUT; 1½	ESP; 1½	AUS; 0	NZL; 3	VEN; 2	IRL; 2	PAR; 1½	WLS; 1	FAI; 4	CRC; 2½	IRI; 2	ITA; 1½
25	Denmark	DEN	26½	10	349.0	4	2	7	BER; 4	PHI; 1	FIN; 1½	IRL; 4	ISR ½	AUT; 1	SUI; 1½	FRA; 2	NZL; 1½	DOM; 3½	IRI; 2½	NOR; 2	SWE; 1½
26	France	FRA	26	14	351.0	6	2	5	PAR; 3	ENG; 0	URU; 0	BOL; 4	GCI; 2½	GUA; 3	COL; 1	DEN; 2	DOM; 2½	SCO; 2	ITA; 1½	THA; 4	SUI ½
27	Dominican Republic	DOM	26	14	300.5	6	2	5	SWE ½	LUX ½	BOL; 2	AHO; 4	CRC; 2	NZL; 1½	GUA; 2½	HON; 2½	FRA; 1½	DEN ½	IVB; 3	AND; 2½	HKG; 3
28	Uruguay	URU	26	13	341.0	6	1	6	ISR ½	JPN; 2	FRA; 4	CHI; 1	WLS; 0	HON; 2½	BER; 3	VEN; 3½	PAR; 1½	THA; 1½	IRL; 2½	GUA; 2½	PHI; 1½
29	Honduras	HON	26	9	304.0	3	3	7	WLS; 2	NOR ½	HKG; 2	THA; 1½	GUA; 1½	URU; 1½	ISV; 4	DOM; 1½	CRC ½	AHO; 4	BOL; 2	FAI; 4	COL; 1
30	Thailand	THA	25½	12	319.5	6	0	7	NOR; 1½	IRI ½	BER; 3	HON; 2½	IRL; 1½	LUX; 1½	GCI; 4	SUI ½	VEN; 3	URU; 2½	NZL; 1	FRA; 0	AHO; 4
31	Iran	IRI	25½	11	367.5	4	3	6	USA; 1	THA; 3½	IRL; 2	CAN; 1½	JPN; 4	ITA; 2	AUS; 3	SWE; 3	ARG; 1	GER; 0	DEN; 1½	BEL; 2	CHI; 1
32	Costa Rica	CRC	25½	11	324.0	5	1	7	CHI; 1	PAR; 1½	ISV; 3½	NZL; 1	DOM; 2	IRL; 1	HKG; 3	GUA; 1½	HON; 3½	BOL; 2½	BEL; 1½	AUT; 0	MNC; 3½
33	Scotland	SCO	25½	10	371.5	3	4	6	BOL; 4	NED; 1½	USA ½	GCI; 4	CAN; 2	SWE; 1½	FIN; 2	COL; 1½	AUT; 1½	FRA; 2	PAR; 2½	ITA; 2	ESP ½
34	Guernsey	GCI	25	14	298.5	7	0	6	AUT; 0	GUA; 3	FAI; 3½	SCO; 0	FRA; 1½	JPN; 2½	THA; 0	PNG; 3½	HKG; 2½	BER; 1½	VEN ½	AHO; 3½	AND; 3
35	Ireland	IRL	25	12	328.0	5	2	6	GER ½	IVB; 4	IRI; 2	DEN; 0	THA; 2½	CRC; 3	BEL; 2	LUX; 2½	ITA; 1½	NZL; 1½	URU; 1½	MNC; 3	ISL; 1
36	Luxembourg	LUX	24½	13	340.5	6	1	6	NED ½	DOM; 3½	WLS; 2½	ISL; 1	PAR; 1½	THA; 2½	NZL; 2½	IRL; 1½	BOL; 2	GUA; 2½	FIN; 1	VEN ½	ISV; 3
37	Guatemala	GUA	24½	12	321.0	6	0	7	BEL; 0	GCI; 1	PNG; 3	MNC; 3	HON; 2½	FRA; 1	DOM; 1½	CRC; 2½	JPN; 3	LUX; 1½	BER; 3	URU; 1½	NZL; 1
38	Japan	JPN	24½	12	296.0	5	2	6	AUS; 0	URU; 2	AND; 3	HKG; 3½	IRI; 0	GCI; 1½	FAI; 3	NZL; 1½	GUA; 1	VEN; 1	AHO; 3½	IVB; 2½	BER; 2
39	Hong Kong	HKG	24½	12	291.5	4	4	5	ISL; 0	AND; 2	HON; 2	JPN ½	PNG; 3	BER; 2	CRC; 1	FAI; 3	GCI; 1½	IVB; 3½	MNC; 2	ISV; 3	DOM; 1
40	Bolivia	BOL	24½	11	286.0	4	3	6	SCO; 0	ISV; 1½	DOM; 2	FRA; 0	AHO; 3½	AND; 4	PNG; 3½	FIN; 1½	LUX; 2	CRC; 1½	HON; 2	PAR; 0	IVB; 3
41	Bermuda	BER	24	14	290.0	5	4	4	DEN; 0	FAI; 2	THA; 1	ISV; 2½	AND; 2½	HKG; 2	URU; 1	MNC; 2	IVB; 3	GCI; 2½	GUA; 1	PNG; 2½	JPN; 2
42	Andorra	AND	23	11	274.0	4	3	6	ITA; 0	HKG; 2	JPN; 1	FAI; 2	BER; 1½	BOL; 0	AHO; 3½	IVB; 3	MNC; 2	ISV; 3	PNG; 2½	DOM; 1½	GCI; 1
43	Monaco	MNC	22	11	277.5	4	3	6	CAN; 0	AHO; 3½	VEN; 0	GUA; 1	ISV; 2½	FAI; 1	IVB; 3	BER; 2	AND; 2	PNG; 3½	HKG; 2	IRL; 1	CRC ½
44	Faroe Islands	FAI	21½	12	277.0	5	2	6	PHI; 0	BER; 2	GCI ½	AND; 2	IVB; 2½	MNC; 3	JPN; 1	HKG; 1	AHO; 3½	BEL; 0	ISV; 3½	HON; 0	PNG; 2½
45	Papua New Guinea	PNG	18	6	280.0	3	0	10	COL ½	VEN ½	GUA; 1	IVB; 3	HKG; 1	AHO; 3	BOL ½	GCI ½	ISV; 3	MNC ½	AND; 1½	BER; 1½	FAI; 1½
46	United States Virgin Islands	ISV	15½	6	283.0	3	0	10	ESP; 0	BOL; 2½	CRC ½	BER; 1½	MNC; 1½	IVB; 2½	HON; 0	AHO; 2½	PNG; 1	AND; 1	FAI ½	HKG; 1	LUX; 1
47	British Virgin Islands	IVB	13½	1	283.5	0	1	12	FIN ½	IRL; 0	AHO; 2	PNG; 1	FAI; 1½	ISV; 1½	MNC; 1	AND; 1	BER; 1	HKG ½	DOM; 1	JPN; 1½	BOL; 1
48	Netherlands Antilles	AHO	7½	1	294.0	0	1	12	SUI; 0	MNC ½	IVB; 2	DOM; 0	BOL ½	PNG; 1	AND ½	ISV; 1½	FAI ½	HON; 0	JPN ½	GCI ½	THA; 0

=== Individual medals ===
- Board 1: (Netherlands) Jan Timman 8½ / 11 = 77.3%
- Board 2: (Netherlands) Gennadi Sosonko 6 / 8 = 75.0%
- Board 3: (Dominican Republic) Marcelo Carrión 9 / 11 = 81.8%
- Board 4: (England) Michael Stean 5½ / 8 = 68.8%
- 1st reserve: (Colombia) Boris de Greiff 5½ / 7 = 78.6%
- 2nd reserve: (United States) Kim Commons 7½ / 9 = 83.3%

== Women's event ==
Twenty-three nations took part in the women's Olympiad. From four preliminary groups the teams were split into three finals. Israel, led by former World Championship challenger Kushnir, won the gold, ahead of England and Spain.

=== Preliminaries ===
- Group 1:

Final	Country	1	2	3	4	5	+	−	=	Points
«A»	Israel	-	1½	2½	2	3	3	0	1	9
«A»	Australia	1½	-	½	2	1½	1	1	2	5½
«B»	Argentina	½	2½	-	1½	1	1	2	1	5½
«B»	Colombia	1	1	1½	-	2	1	2	1	5½
«C»	Austria	0	1½	2	1	-	1	2	1	4½

- Group 2:

Final	Country	1	2	3	4	5	6	+	−	=	Points
«A»	Netherlands	-	2½	2½	1½	3	3	4	0	1	12½
«A»	Denmark	½	-	1½	1½	3	3	2	1	2	9½
«B»	Finland	½	1½	-	2	2½	2	3	1	1	8½
«B»	Canada	1½	1½	1	-	1½	2	1	1	3	7½
«C»	Wales	0	0	½	1½	-	2½	1	3	1	4½
«C»	Japan	0	0	1	1	½	-	0	5	0	2½

- Group 3:

Final	Country	1	2	3	4	5	6	+	−	=	Points
«A»	England	-	2½	2	2½	2½	3	5	0	0	12½
«A»	Spain	½	-	2	2½	2½	3	4	1	0	10½
«B»	France	1	1	-	1	2	3	2	3	0	8
«B»	Italy	½	½	2	-	2½	1½	2	2	1	7
«C»	Sweden	½	½	1	½	-	3	1	4	0	5½
«C»	New Zealand	0	0	0	1½	0	-	0	4	1	1½

- Group 4:

Final	Country	1	2	3	4	5	6	+	−	=	Points
«A»	United States	-	1½	3	2	2	3	4	0	1	11½
«A»	West Germany	1½	-	2	2½	½	3	3	1	1	9½
«B»	Philippines	0	1	-	1½	3	3	2	2	1	8½
«B»	Ireland	1	½	1½	-	1½	3	1	2	2	7½
«C»	Switzerland	1	2½	0	1½	-	2	2	2	1	7
«C»	Scotland	0	0	0	0	1	-	0	5	0	1

=== Finals ===
Final A
#	Country	Players	Average rating	Points	MP
1	Israel	Kushnir, Kristol, Podrazhanskaya, Nudelman	2182	17	
2	England	Hartston, Jackson, Pritchard, Caldwell	2115	11½	8
3	Spain	Ferrer, García, Pino García Padrón, Canela	1890	11½	7
4	United States	Savereide, Crotto, Herstein, Orton	2112	10½	
5	Netherlands	van der Mije, Vreeken, Belle, van der Giessen	2182	9½	
6	West Germany	Laakmann, Weichert, Prill-Gassemann, Wasnetsky	2070	9	
7	Australia	McGrath, Kellner, Pope, Depasquale	1958	8½	
8	Denmark	Høiberg, Haahr, Larsen	1917	6½	

Final B
#	Country	Players	Average rating	Points	MP
9	Canada	Vujosevic, Shterenberg, Day, Williams M.	1907	13½	
10	Italy	Gramignani, Pernici, Merciai, Romano D.	1800	12	
11	Argentina	Arias, Soppe, Cazón, Tadei	1800	11½	
12	Ireland	Healy, O'Siochrú, Noonan, Shouldice	1897	10½	
13	Finland	Vuorenpää, Pihlajamäki, Ristoja, Laitinen	1852	10	
14	France	Merlini, Tagnon, Ruck-Petit, Warkentin	1880	9½	6
15	Colombia	Leyva, Herrera L., Zapata, Patiño	1800	9½	5
16	Philippines	Cartel, Emperado, Lizares, Alvárez	1800	7	

Final C
#	Country	Players	Average rating	Points	MP
17	Switzerland	Näpfer, Veprek, Wettstein, Ludwig	1875	12	10
18	Austria	Hausner, Hennings, Kattinger, Samt	1940	12	9
19	Sweden	Dahlin, Svensson, Svantesson, Bohmgren	2012	11½	
20	Japan	Nakagawa, Watai, Maeda, Terada M.	1830	11	
21	Scotland	Elder, Hindle, Leask, Houstoun	1810	7½	
22	Wales	Garwell, Brunker, Davies, Jarman	1800	6½	
23	New Zealand	Terry L., Stretch, Hollis A.	1800	2½	

=== Final «A» ===
No.	Country	1	2	3	4	5	6	7	8	+	−	=	Points
1	Israel	-	2½	2	2½	3	2	2	3	7	0	0	17
2	England	½	-	2	1½	2½	2½	1	1½	3	2	2	11½
3	Spain	1	1	-	½	1½	2	2½	3	3	3	1	11½
4	United States	½	1½	2½	-	0	1½	2	2½	3	2	2	10½
5	Netherlands	0	½	1½	3	-	1½	1½	1½	1	2	4	9½
6	West Germany	1	½	1	1½	1½	-	1½	2	1	3	3	9
7	Australia	1	2	½	1	1½	1½	-	1	1	4	2	4½
8	Denmark	0	1½	0	½	1½	1	2	-	1	4	2	6½

=== Final «B» ===
No.	Country	9	10	11	12	13	14	15	16	+	−	=	Points
9	Canada	-	2	2½	1	1	2½	2	2½	5	2	0	13½
10	Italy	1	-	2½	2	1½	1	2	2	4	2	1	12
11	Argentina	½	½	-	2½	2	1½	1½	3	3	2	2	11½
12	Ireland	2	1	½	-	2½	1	1	2½	3	4	0	10½
13	Finland	2	1½	1	½	-	2	2	1	3	3	1	10
14	France	½	2	1½	2	1	-	1	1½	2	3	2	9½
15	Colombia	1	1	1½	2	1	2	-	1	2	4	1	9½
16	Philippines	½	1	0	½	2	1½	2	-	2	4	1	7½

=== Final «C» ===
No.	Country	17	18	19	20	21	22	23	+	−	=	Points
17	Switzerland	-	1	2	2	2	2½	2½	5	1	0	12
18	Austria	2	-	1½	1½	2½	3	1½	3	0	3	12
19	Sweden	1	1½	-	1	2½	2½	3	3	2	1	11½
20	Japan	1	1½	2	-	1½	2	3	3	1	2	11
21	Scotland	1	½	½	1½	-	1½	2½	1	3	2	7½
22	Wales	½	0	½	1	1½	-	3	1	4	1	6½
23	New Zealand	½	1½	0	0	½	0	-	0	5	1	2½

=== Individual medals ===
- Board 1: (Israel) Alla Kushnir 7½ / 8 = 93.8%
- Board 2: (Canada) Nava Shterenberg 9 / 10 = 90.0%
- Board 3: (Japan) Hyroko Maeda 6½ / 8 = 81.3%
- Reserve: (Israel) Lea Nudelman 6½ / 7 = 92.9%
