= Marcelo Carrión =

Dominican chess player

Personal information
- Born: 10 May 1956 (age 70)

Chess career
- Country: Dominican Republic
- Title: FIDE Master (2009)
- Peak rating: 2300 (January 1977)

Marcelo Carrión (born 10 May 1956) is a Dominican chess FIDE Master (FM) (2009) and Chess Olympiad individual gold medal winner (1976).

== Biography ==
In 1986, Marcelo Carrión won the Columbia District Chess Championship. He participated in multiple Dominican Chess Championships. In 2001, Marcelo Carrión shared first to fourth place in the Dominican Chess Championship, ranking third by additional scores. In 2001, he ranked third in the Santo Domingo International Chess Tournament.

Marcelo Carrión played for the Dominican Republic in the Chess Olympiads:

- in 1976, at the third board in the 22nd Chess Olympiad in Haifa (+7, =4, -0), winning an individual gold medal,
- in 1984, at the fourth board in the 26th Chess Olympiad in Thessaloniki (+4, =3, -2),
- in 2002, at the first reserve board in the 35th Chess Olympiad in Bled (+0, =0, -3).

Marcelo Carrión played for the Dominican Republic in the World Student Team Chess Championship:

- in 1974, at the second board in the 20th World Student Team Chess Championship in Teesside (+3, =2, -7).

Marcelo Carrión played for the Dominican Republic in the World Youth U26 Team Chess Championship:

- in 1980, at the fourth board in the 2nd World Youth U26 Team Chess Championship in Mexico City (+2, =2, -7).
