= Mary Davies =

Mary Davies may refer to:

== Arts and entertainment ==
- Mary Davies (mezzo-soprano) (1855–1930), Welsh singer
- Mary Davies (poet) (1846–1882), Welsh poet
- Mary Bridget Davies (born 1978), American singer and actress
- Mary Ignatius Davies (1921–2003), Sister of Mercy and music teacher

== Literature ==
- Mary Carolyn Davies (1888–?), American writer
- Mary Davies (writer) from 16th Lambda Literary Awards

== Sports ==
- Mary Davies (athlete), represented New Zealand at the 2009 World Championships in Athletics
- Mary Davies (bowls), Welsh lawn bowler
- Mary Elizabeth Davies, Welsh chess player

== Others ==
- Mary Davies Wilburn (1883–1987), longest-lived survivor of the sinking of the RMS Titanic
- Mary Davies (heiress), wife of Sir Thomas Grosvenor, 3rd Baronet

== See also ==
- Mary Davys (1670s–1732), Irish novelist and playwright
- Mary Davis (disambiguation)
