= Welsh Chess Championship =

The modern Welsh Chess Championship was inaugurated in 1955. The champion earned a place in the British Championship.

Year	Men's Champion	Women's Champion
1955	Arthur S. Griffiths	Beryl E. F. Kenyon
1956	Briant Peter Bourne	Beryl E. F. Kenyon
1957	M. E. Wise & Grahame F. Barnard	Nancy Budzinski née Scott
1958	Brian V. Douthwaite	N. Budzinski & Maria MacLean
1959	Donald A. Curtis	not held
1960	Pat J. Bennett	not held
1961	Pat J. Bennett, John Denley Mills	Maria MacLean
1962	Arthur O. Jones, W. D. Newcombe	not held
1963	George P. Moore	Shirley Mann
1964	Graham H. Chesters	Zbyzska Southall
1965	David Ian Wishart Reynolds	Shirley Mills (née Mann) & C Beryl Williams
1966	David John Sully	Zbyzska Southall
1967	Colin Gilbert	Zbyzska Southall
1968	Arthur Howard Williams, Mikhail Gavrilovik	Zbyzska Southall
1969	Mikhail Gavrilovik	Zbiska Southall & Hazel Brunker
1970	Mikhail Gavrilovik, Graham H Chesters	Hazel Brunker
1971	Arthur Howard Williams	Zbiska Southall
1972	Arthur Howard Williams	Hazel Brunker
1973	John Trevelyan, Stuart James Hutchings, George Botterill, Moss McCarthy	Hazel Brunker
1974	Arthur Howard Williams	Mary Elizabeth Davies
1975	Arthur Howard Williams	Beryl Jarman
1976	John Grantley Cooper, Emmanuel M. Rayner	Jane Garwell
1977	Arthur Howard Williams, John Grantley Cooper	Deborah Evans
1978	John Grantley Cooper, Arthur Howard Williams	Jane Garwell
1979	John Trevelyan, David John Sully	Deborah Evans
1980	Arthur Howard Williams	Jane Garwell
1981	Arthur Howard Williams	Jane Garwell, Diana James
1982	Arthur Howard Williams	Jane Anson & Hazel Brunker
1983	Stephen Collin James, Iolo Ceredig Jones, Paul A. Lamford, Arthur Howard Williams	Jane Garwell
1984	John Grantley Cooper	Lynda Powell
1985	John Grantley Cooper	Hazel Brunker
1986	Arthur Howard Williams	Lynda Powell
1987	Arthur Howard Williams, Moss McCarthy	Diana Adams
1988	Arthur Howard Williams, Paul A. Lamford	Lynda Powell
1989	Paul A. Lamford	Hazel Brunker
1990	Charles F. Morris, P O'Neill, Stuart James Hutchings	Hazel Brunker
1991	Arthur Howard Williams, Andrew R. Jones	Deborah Cooper (née Evans, later -Quek), Jane Garwell
1992	John Grantley Cooper	Jane Richmond (née Garwell)
1993	John Grantley Cooper, Arthur Howard Williams	Jane Richmond (née Garwell)
1994	John Grantley Cooper, Arthur Howard Williams	Jane Richmond (née Garwell)
1995	John Grantley Cooper	Jane Richmond (née Garwell)
1996	David H. Cummings	Jane Richmond (née Garwell)
1997	David H. Cummings	Amanda John
1998	David H. Cummings, Andrew Dyce, Sven Zeidler, Gareth Morris	Julie Wilson
1999	James Cobb	Beryl Hughes
2000	Leighton Williams	Deborah Evans-Quek (née Evans, formerly Cooper)
2001	James Cobb	no contest
2002	Richard S. Jones	Abigail Cast
2003	Richard S. Jones	Deborah Evans-Quek
2004	Suan Evans-Quek	Jane Richmond (née Garwell)
2005	Leighton Williams	Olivia Smith
2006	John Trevelyan	Abigail Cast
2007	James Cobb	Abigail Cast
2008	Leighton Williams, James Cobb	Suzy Blackburn
2009	Ioan Rees, Richard S. Jones	Olivia Smith, Suzy Blackburn
2010	Richard S. Jones	Olivia Smith
2011	Arthur Howard Williams, Sven Zeidler	Olivia Smith
2012	Tim Kett, Richard S. Jones	Suzy Blackburn
2013	Richard S. Jones	Syringa Camp, Stephanie Du Toit
2014	Tim Kett	Olivia Smith
2015	James Cobb	Lynda Roberts (née Powell, later Smith)
2016	Tim Kett	Julie Van Kemenade
2017	Allan J. Pleasants	Imogen Camp, Shayanna Sivarajasingam, Venetia Sivarajasingam,
2018	Gerry Heap, David Jameson and Sven Zeidler	Venetia Sivarajasingam
2019	Tim Kett	Imogen A. L. Camp
2022	Jose Camacho-Collados	Lynda Smith
2023	Daniel Kozusek	Lynda Smith
2024	Daniel Kozusek	Olivia Smith
2025	Jose Camacho-Collados	Emma Kong
2026	Jose Camacho-Collados	Imogen A L Camp

The Henry Golding Individual Trophy for the Welsh Champion
