= Ruth Herstein =

American chess player (1932–1999)

Personal information
- Born: April 12, 1932 Heerlen, The Netherlands
- Died: September 13, 1999 (aged 67) Santa Monica, California

Chess career
- Country: United States

Ruth Herstein (April 12, 1932 – September 13, 1999) was an American chess player, U.S. Women's Chess Championship medalist (1975, 1976)

== Biography ==
In the 1970s, Herstein was one of the leading female chess players in the United States. She often participated in the United States Women's Chess Championship, which achieved the best results in 1975 and 1976 when she shared second and third place.

Herstein played for United States in the Women's Chess Olympiads:

- In 1974, at second board in the 6th Chess Olympiad (women) in Medellín (+7, =2, -2),
- In 1976, at third board in the 7th Chess Olympiad (women) in Haifa (+4, =3, -2),
- In 1978, at third board in the 8th Chess Olympiad (women) in Buenos Aires (+4, =0, -6).
