= Juan Leon Jimenez Molina =

Costa Rican chess player (born 1953)

Personal information
- Born: 4 May 1953 (age 73)

Chess career
- Country: Costa Rica
- Title: FIDE Master (1999)
- Peak rating: 2260 (January 1978)

Juan Leon Jimenez Molina (born 4 May 1953) is a Costa Rican chess FIDE Master (FM), four-times Costa Rican Chess Championship winner (1972, 1975, 1977, 1978).

== Biography ==
In the 1970s Juan Leon Jimenez Molina was one of the leading chess players in Costa Rica. He four times won Costa Rican Chess Championships: 1972, 1975, 1977, and 1978. In 1975 in El Salvador Juan Leon Jimenez Molina participated in World Chess Championships Caribbean-Central American Zonal tournament and shared 9th-10th place.

Juan Leon Jimenez Molina played for Costa Rica in the Chess Olympiad:

- In 1976, at third board in the 22nd Chess Olympiad in Haifa (+5, =4, -1),
- In 2006, at second reserve board in the 37th Chess Olympiad in Turin (+1, =0, -2).

Juan Leon Jimenez Molina played for Costa Rica in the World Student Team Chess Championships:

- In 1976, at third board in the 21st World Student Team Chess Championship in Caracas (+2, =7, -1),
- In 1977, at second board in the 22nd World Student Team Chess Championship in Mexico City (+3, =4, -4).
