= Sergio Minero Pineda =

Costa Rican chess player (born 1974)

Personal information
- Born: February 21, 1974 (age 52)

Chess career
- Country: Costa Rica
- Title: International Master (1996)
- Peak rating: 2440 (January 2005)

Sergio Minero Pineda (born 1974) is a Costa Rican chess player. He was awarded the title International Master by FIDE in 1996.

== Career ==
He has represented Costa Rica at a number of Chess Olympiads, including 1988 (scoring 6/11 on board 4), 1990 (8.5/13 on board 3), 2002 (7/11 on board 2), 2014 (4/9 on board 3) and 2016 (6/10 on board 1).

He has won the Costa Rican Chess Championship five times; in 1992, 1999, 2004, 2015 and 2020.

He qualified for the Chess World Cup 2021,
