= Richard Goldenberg =

French chess player (1947–2023)

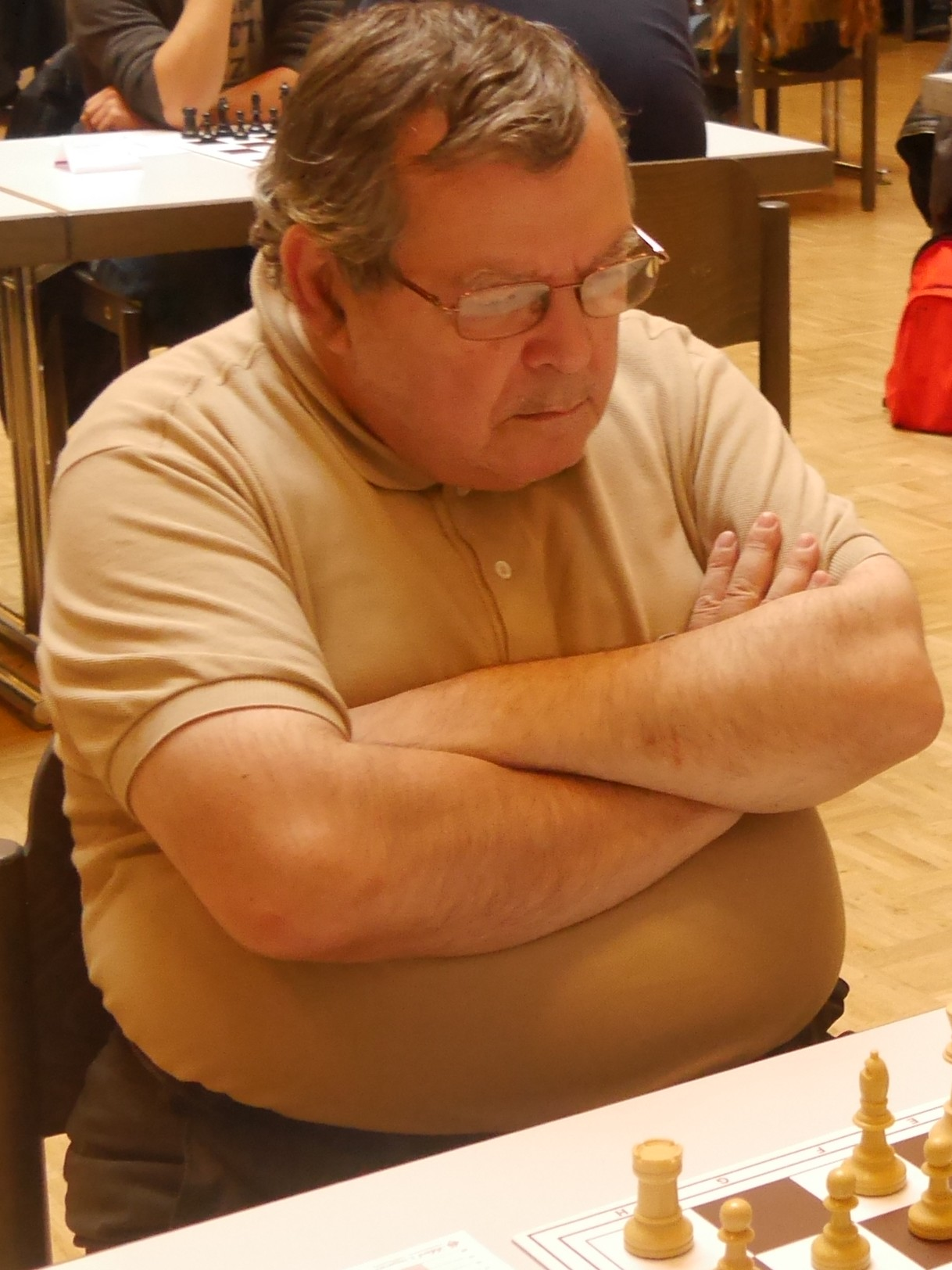
- Goldenberg in 2016

Personal information
- Born: 21 November 1947 Paris, France
- Died: 10 March 2023 (aged 75) in France

Chess career
- Country: France
- Title: FIDE Master (1981); International Correspondence Chess Master (1986)
- Peak rating: 2365 (January 1980)

Richard Goldenberg (21 November 1947 – 10 March 2023) was a French chess player. He was a FIDE Master (FM), an International Correspondence Chess Master (1986), and a two-time French Chess Championship silver medalist (1978, 1981).

== Biography ==
In the mid-1970s to the mid-1980s Goldenberg was one of the leading French chess players. He participated in the finals of the French Chess Championships many times. Goldenberg won silver medals twice in these tournaments: in 1978 in Castelnaudary he ranked 2nd and in 1981 in Vitrolles he shared 1st with Jean-Luc Seret but lost an additional play-off 0:2.

Goldenberg played for France in the Chess Olympiads:

- In 1976, at first reserve board in the 22nd Chess Olympiad in Haifa (+4, =1, -6),
- In 1980, at first reserve board in the 24th Chess Olympiad in La Valletta (+1, =4, -1).

Goldenberg played for France in the European Team Chess Championship preliminaries:

- In 1977, at sixth board in the 6th European Team Chess Championship preliminaries (+1, =1, -4),
- In 1983, at eighth board in the 8th European Team Chess Championship preliminaries (+0, =2, -0).

Goldenberg played for France in the World Student Team Chess Championship:

- In 1972, at first board in the 19th World Student Team Chess Championship in Graz (+4, =3, -5).

Goldenberg played for France in the Men's Chess Mitropa Cups:

- In 1978, at first board in the 3rd Chess Mitropa Cup in Ciocco (+1, =2, -3),
- In 1981, at second board in the 6th Chess Mitropa Cup in Luxembourg (+1, =2, -2),
- In 1982, at first board in the 7th Chess Mitropa Cup in Bourgoin-Jallieu (+0, =3, -0) and won team gold medal,
- In 1983, at second board in the 8th Chess Mitropa Cup in Lienz (+1, =2, -1).

In his later years, Goldenberg active participated in correspondence chess tournaments. He participated in 13th World Correspondence Chess Championship final (1989–1998). In 1986, Richard Goldenberg was awarded the ICCF International Correspondence Chess Master (IM) title.

Goldenberg died on 10 March 2023.
