= Nicole Tagnon =

French chess player

Personal information
- Born: 20 February 1950 (age 76) Paris, France

Chess career
- Country: France
- Title: Women FIDE Master (1982)
- Peak rating: 2190 (July 1988)

Nicole Tagnon (born 20 February 1950) is a French chess Women FIDE master (WFM), seven-times French Women's Chess Championship medalist (1975, 1976, 1977, 1981, 1983, 1986, 1991).

== Biography ==
From the mid-1970s to the early 1990s, Nicole Tagnon was one of France's leading women's chess players. She has participated many times in French women's chess championships, where she has won seven medals: four silver (1976, 1977, 1983, 1991) and three bronze (1975, 1981, 1986). In 1987, in Budel Nicole Tagnon participated in Women's World Chess Championship West European Zonal tournament and shared 3rd–5th place.

Nicole Tagnon played for France in the Women's Chess Olympiads:

- In 1976, at second board in the 7th Chess Olympiad (women) in Haifa (+5, =3, -4),
- In 1978, at second board in the 8th Chess Olympiad (women) in Buenos Aires (+4, =2, -6),
- In 1982, at first board in the 10th Chess Olympiad (women) in Lucerne (+5, =4, -4),
- In 1984, at first board in the 26th Chess Olympiad (women) in Thessaloniki (+4, =3, -6),
- In 1986, at third board in the 27th Chess Olympiad (women) in Dubai (+2, =3, -4),
- In 1988, at third board in the 28th Chess Olympiad (women) in Thessaloniki (+4, =2, -5),
- In 1992, at second board in the 30th Chess Olympiad (women) in Manila (+2, =0, -7).
