= Jane Richmond =

Welsh chess player (born 1961)

Personal information
- Born: 16 June 1961 (age 65) Solihull, England

Chess career
- Country: Wales
- Title: Woman FIDE Master (1986)
- Peak rating: 2185 (January 1987)

Jane Richmond (née Garwell, born 16 June 1961) is a Welsh chess Woman FIDE Master (WFM), British Women's Chess Championship winner (1982), twelve-times Welsh Women's Chess Championship winner (1976, 1978, 1980, 1981, 1983, 1991, 1992, 1993, 1994, 1995, 1996, 2004), Chess Olympiad individual silver medal winner (1978).

== Biography ==
Jane Richmond has won twelve times in the Welsh Women's Chess Championships: 1976, 1978, 1980, 1981 (jointly), 1983, 1991 (jointly), 1992, 1993, 1994, 1995, 1996, and 2004. Also she won British Women's Chess Championships in 1982.

Jane Richmond played for Wales in the Chess Olympiads:

- In 1976, at third board in the 7th Chess Olympiad (women) in Haifa (+3, =4, -4),
- In 1978, at first reserve board in the 8th Chess Olympiad (women) in Buenos Aires (+8, =3, -1) and won individual silver medal,
- In 1980, at first reserve board in the 9th Chess Olympiad (women) in Valletta (+7, =2, -4),
- In 1984, at third board in the 26th Chess Olympiad (women) in Thessaloniki (+5, =5, -3),
- In 1986, at third board in the 27th Chess Olympiad (women) in Dubai (+5, =4, -4),
- In 1988, at second board in the 28th Chess Olympiad (women) in Thessaloniki (+6, =3, -2),
- In 1992, at third board in the 30th Chess Olympiad (women) in Manila (+5, =3, -4).

Jane Richmond played for Wales in the European Team Chess Championships:

- In 1989, at second reserve board in the 9th European Team Chess Championship in Haifa (+1, =0, -3).

Jane Richmond played for Wales in the World Youth U26 Team Chess Championship:

- In 1983, at fourth board in the 4th World Youth U26 Team Chess Championship in Chicago (+4, =1, -2).
