= Ramón Mateo =

Dominican chess grandmaster (born 1958)

Personal information
- Born: 23 June 1958 (age 68) San Juan de la Maguana

Chess career
- Country: Dominican Republic
- Title: Grandmaster (2008)
- Peak rating: 2506 (April 2008)

Ramón Mateo (born 23 June 1958) is a Dominican chess player and the first grandmaster from his country, earning the title in 2008.

He has won the Dominican Chess Championship seven times: in 1979, 1986, 2000, 2002, 2003, 2004, and 2010. He also represented his country in 15 Chess Olympiads, from the 1978 23rd Chess Olympiad to the 38th Chess Olympiad in 2008.
