= David John Sully =

Welsh chess player

Personal information
- Born: 29 June 1947 (age 79) Cardiff, Wales

Chess career
- Country: Wales
- Peak rating: 2148 (January 2006)

David John Sully (born 29 June 1947) is a Welsh chess player, two-times Welsh Chess Championship winner (1966, 1979).

== Biography ==
David John Sully has won two times in the Welsh Chess Championships: 1966, and 1979 (jointly).

David John Sully played for Wales in the Chess Olympiad:

- In 1974, at first reserve board in the 21st Chess Olympiad in Nice (+1, =0, -8).
