= Jolanta Dahlin =

Swedish chess player (1940–1991)

Personal information
- Born: 30 July 1940 Poręba, Province of Silesia, Nazi Germany
- Died: 1991

Chess career
- Country: Poland (until 1975); Sweden (after 1975)
- Title: Woman FIDE Master (1987)
- Peak rating: 2170 (January 1987)

Jolanta Dahlin (née Szota, 30 July 1940 – 1991), was a Polish and Swedish chess player, who hold the FIDE title of Woman FIDE Master (1987). She was a winner of the Swedish Women's Chess Championship (1973).

== Chess career and personal life ==
At the turn of the 1960s and 1970s, Jolanta Szota was one of Poland's leading chess players. She made her first start in the final of the Polish Women's Chess Championship in 1962 in Grudziądz. Until 1971, she appeared eight times in the Polish Women's Chess Championship final tournaments, winning two titles of the Polish women's vice-champion: in 1967 in Kielce and in 1971 in Piotrków Trybunalski. In addition, in 1966, 1968 and 1969 she was fourth in the Polish Women's Chess Championship finals. She represented the colors of the Legion Warsaw chess club many times in the Polish Team Chess Championship and five times (1961, 1963, 1964, 1967, 1969) winning gold medals. In 1971, she took part in two international tournaments, occupying 5th–6th place in Brașov, and 5th place in Piotrków Trybunalski.

After she married Gunnar Dahlin, she emigrated to Sweden and settled in Gothenburg, where she worked in a company trading with Eastern European countries. In 1973, she won the title of the Swedish Women's Chess Champion, and in 1976 she took 2nd place in the International Women's Chess tournament in Stockholm.

Jolanta Dahlin two times participated in the Women's World Chess Championship European Zonal Tournaments:

- in 1975 in Karlovy Vary at European zonal 1 she shared 5th–7th place;
- in 1985 in Eksjö at Nordic European subzonal she shared 4th–5th place.

Jolanta Dahlin played for Sweden in the Women's Chess Olympiads:

- In 1974, at second board in the 6th Chess Olympiad (women) in Medellín (+6, =1, −3),
- In 1976, at first board in the 7th Chess Olympiad (women) in Haifa (+3, =4, −2),
- In 1978, at second board in the 8th Chess Olympiad (women) in Buenos Aires (+2, =3, −4),
- In 1984, at third board in the 26th Chess Olympiad (women) in Thessaloniki (+1, =4, −4).

Jolanta Dahlin played for Sweden in the Nordic Chess Cup:

- In 1977, at fifth board in the 8th Nordic Chess Cup in Glücksburg (+4, =1, −0), and won team and individual gold medals.

=== Death ===
Jolanta Dahlin died of cancer in 1991.
