= Puzzle Panel =

Puzzle Panel was a light-hearted, though cerebral BBC Radio 4 panel game that was broadcast between 1998 and 2005. An additional series was broadcast over the winter-spring of 2011, and a further series was broadcast during the same period in 2012. It has been written and presented by puzzle columnist for The Guardian, Chris Maslanka.

In each half-hour programme, the panellists brought along one puzzle with which to test the mental mettle of the other two panellists and their host. Essentially, it was just for fun and no points were scored. Another puzzle, the Panel Beater, was contributed by a listener. A prize was available for solving a competition puzzle.

== Programme format ==
During the opening introduction, Chris Maslanka would present a few short puzzles for the listeners and panellists to work on during the course of the programme. He would then introduce the three panellists, and invite each in turn to present a puzzle to the others.

Each panellist would present a different type of puzzle. In general, one would be a numerical puzzle, one would be literal (i.e. a word puzzle) and one would be a logic puzzle.

Interwoven between these puzzles, Maslanka would invite the panellists to solve the puzzles from the introduction, present the Panel Beater puzzle, and read out correspondence from the listeners.

The Listener's Puzzle would be set at the end of the programme. On some occasions, this would involve a short play with the parts played by the members of the panel. A frequent theme for these plays centred on Maslanka playing the role of Hercule Poirot. Occasionally, Maslanka would play the piano, with him and the panellists singing a song, sometimes using some awful (but very well crafted) puns.

== Panellists ==
Regular panellists included:

- David J. Bodycombe, puzzle devisor
- Victor Bryant, mathematician
- Geoffrey Durham, magician
- Rob Eastaway, author and lecturer
- Val Gilbert, Daily Telegraph crossword editor
- William Hartston, newspaper columnist
- Paul Lamford, Backgammon champion and writer
- Don Manley, crossword writer
- Prof. Angela Newing, research scientist
- Prof. David Singmaster, mathematician and puzzle collector

Other panellists included:

- Johnny Ball, TV presenter and maths populariser
- Philip Carter, prolific author of IQ puzzle books
- Prof. Marcus du Sautoy, mathematician and presenter of BBC Four's Mind Games
- Richard Vranch PhD., performer

In the last two programmes of the 2005 series, a couple of listeners were invited to join the panel. Programme five's guest, Stephen Buxton, was a regular Panel Beater contributor, and programme six's guest, Jenny Murray, was a member of the public who regularly answered the Listener's Puzzle correctly.

== Producers ==
The original producer was Harry Parker. Clare Csonka produced a few series, and the 2005 series was produced by Harry Parker once more.
