= Arthur Howard Williams =

Welsh chess player (born 1950)

Personal information
- Born: 11 July 1950 (age 76) Pontyclun, Wales

Chess career
- Country: Wales
- Title: FIDE Master (1985)
- Peak rating: 2415 (January 1975)

Arthur Howard Williams (born 11 July 1950) is a Welsh chess FIDE Master (FM), British Chess Championship medalist (1974), eighteen-times Welsh Chess Championship winner (1968, 1971, 1972, 1974, 1975, 1977, 1978, 1980, 1981, 1982, 1983, 1986, 1987, 1988, 1991, 1993, 1994, 2011). He was the first Welsh player to have a fide rating over 2400.

== Biography ==
Arthur Howard Williams has won eighteen times in the Welsh Chess Championships: 1968 (jointly), 1971, 1972, 1974, 1975, 1977 (jointly), 1978, 1980, 1981, 1982, 1983 (jointly), 1986, 1987 (jointly), 1988 (jointly), 1991 (jointly), 1993 (jointly), 1994 (jointly), 2011 (jointly). In 1974, he shared first place in the British Chess Championship.

Arthur Howard Williams played for Wales in the Chess Olympiads:

- In 1972, at first board in the 20th Chess Olympiad in Skopje (+6, =8, -3),
- In 1974, at first board in the 21st Chess Olympiad in Nice (+5, =6, -7),
- In 1976, at second board in the 22nd Chess Olympiad in Haifa (+4, =3, -3),
- In 1978, at second board in the 23rd Chess Olympiad in Buenos Aires (+4, =6, -1),
- In 1980, at first board in the 24th Chess Olympiad in La Valletta (+4, =5, -3),
- In 1982, at first board in the 25th Chess Olympiad in Lucerne (+3, =6, -3),
- In 1984, at first board in the 26th Chess Olympiad in Thessaloniki (+3, =3, -6),
- In 1986, at second board in the 27th Chess Olympiad in Dubai (+2, =0, -3).

Arthur Howard Williams played for Wales in the European Team Chess Championship:

- In 2011, at first board in the 18th European Team Chess Championship in Porto Carras (+2, =1, -4).

He also authored a theoretical work, an opening monograph Alekhine's Defence (1973).

== Notable game ==
Rogoff vs. Williams, Stockholm 1969

Position: e1 white queen, b1 white rook, h2 white king, g2 white knight, b2 white rook, f3 white pawn, e3 white bishop, d3 white bishop, b3 white knight, a3 white pawn, h4 white pawn, g4 white pawn, e4 white pawn, c4 white pawn, b4 white pawn, e5 black pawn, d5 white pawn, c5 black pawn, h6 black pawn, g6 black pawn, d6 black pawn, b6 black pawn, a6 black knight, h7 black king, f7 black pawn, e7 black knight, a7 black pawn, e8 black bishop, d8 black bishop, c8 black queen, b8 black rook, a8 black rook

Position just before White played 94. bxc5

Arthur Howard Williams is co-author of chess game record with latest first capture. In game Rogoff – Williams (World Junior Chess Championship, Stockholm 1969) the first capture occurred only on White's 94th move.
