= Marina High School (Huntington Beach, California) =

Location
- 15871 Springdale Street; Huntington Beach, California 92649; United States; 33°43′52″N 118°1′31″W

Information
- Type: Public high school
- Motto: Live. Breathe. Vikings.
- Established: 1963
- School district: Huntington Beach Union High School District
- Principal: Rob Rasmussen
- Faculty: 95.04
- Grades: 9–12
- Enrollment: 2,007 (2023–24)
- Student to teacher ratio: 21.98
- Campus: Suburban Area
- Colors: Navy Blue, Gold, & Columbia Blue
- Athletics conference: CIF Southern Section; Sunset League
- Team name: Vikings
- Website: www.marinavikings.org

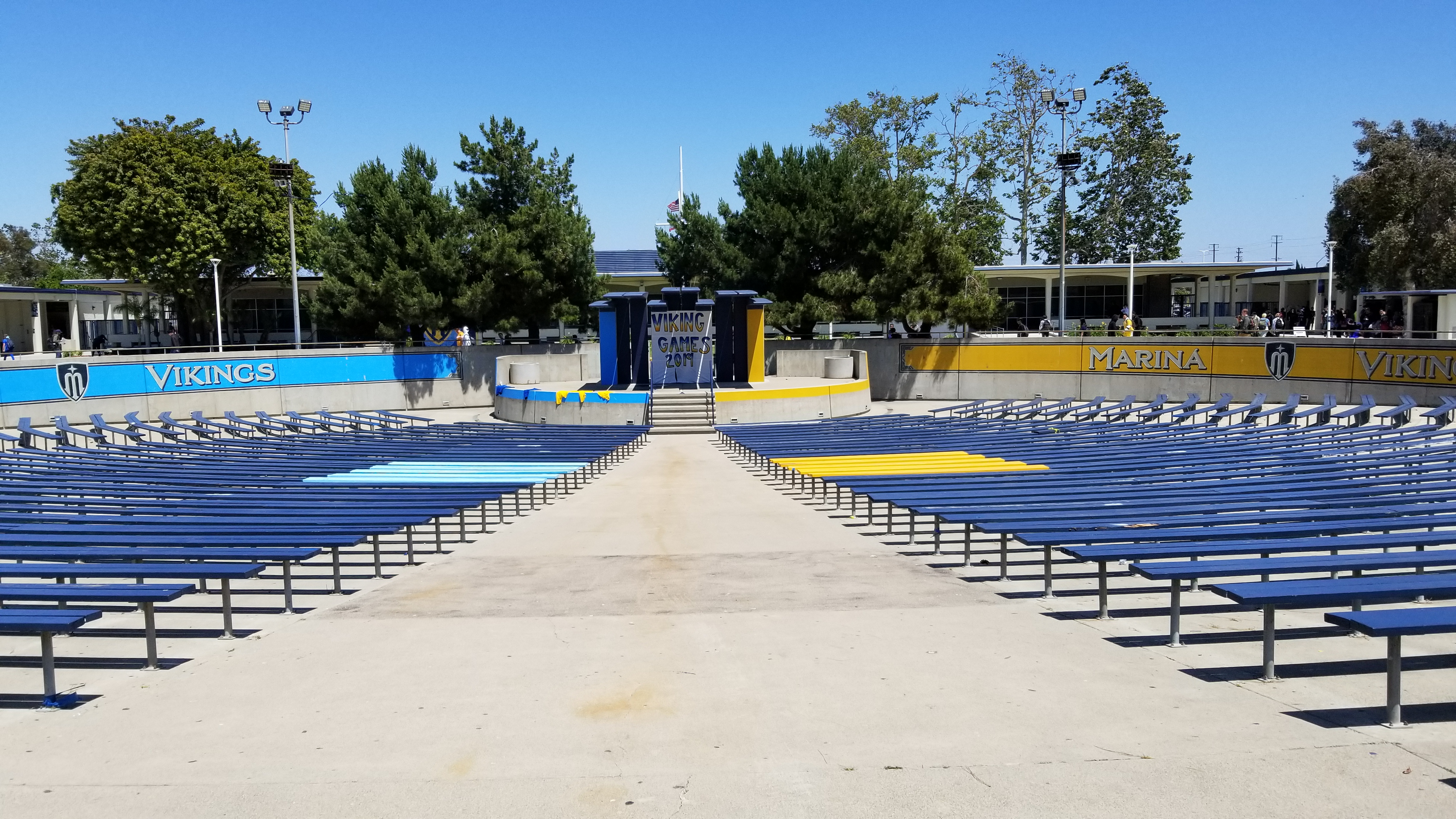
"The Bowl"

Marina High School is a public high school located in the northwest corner of Huntington Beach, California opened in fall 1963 as Huntington Beach-Marina High School, as Huntington Beach High School was undergoing earthquake renovations. Marina split and became its own entity in the fall of 1965, and graduated their first class in 1966. Marina is part of the Huntington Beach Union High School District, which includes several other area high schools. The school is located on Springdale Street between Edinger Avenue and McFadden Avenue. In 2009, the school was named a California Distinguished School, the highest honor given to schools in California.

== Athletics ==
Marina's athletic teams are known as the Vikings and their school colors are Navy Blue, Columbia Blue, and Gold. The compete in the sunset league. Marina has no on-campus stadium and plays most of its football home games at nearby Westminster High School. Marina High is currently building a stadium for their on-campus games.

== Other activities ==
On September 20, 2013, for the first time, a transgender teen was named as Marina High School's homecoming queen.

Beginning in 2014, the woodshop class of the school (whose mascot is a Viking) began planning, funding, and constructing a replica of a Viking ship. In May 2016 the ship sailed on its maiden voyage at Sunset Aquatic Marina; short ocean-going trips to Long Beach and Catalina Island are planned for the future.

== Notable alumni ==
- Victoria Anthony, 2015 and 2017 U.S. Open champion and Olympian.
- Mihai Bagiu, Olympic gymnast
- Daric Barton, professional baseball player
- Jake Bauers, professional baseball player, 2026 NLCS MVP
- Robin Beauregard, Olympic medalist
- Vanessa Laine Bryant, model, dancer
- Johnny Christ, bassist for American metal band Avenged Sevenfold
- Evelyn Cisneros, ballerina, former principal dancer for the San Francisco Ballet
- Kim Commons, international chess master
- Sofia Cook, soccer player
- Kevin Elster, former MLB baseball player
- Bob Forrest, vocalist of the bands Thelonious Monster and The Bicycle Thief
- Chanda Gunn, Olympic bronze medalist in 2006, women's ice hockey goaltender
- Adam Hayward, NFL football player for the Tampa Bay Buccaneers
- Michael Iskander, Actor, Amazon's House of David, Broadway Kimberly Akimbo
- Alan Knipe, head coach of the Long Beach State 49ers men's volleyball team and former head coach of the United States men's national volleyball team
- Mike Lapper, American Soccer Player, member 1994 USA World Cup team, MLS player Columbus Crew
- Cory Lewis, MLB pitcher
- Trevor Megill, professional baseball player
- Dave Mustaine, lead vocalist and guitarist for hard rock/metal band, Megadeth
- Natalie Nakase, basketball player and coach
- Marc Newfield, former MLB baseball player
- Lute Olson, NCAA Champion basketball coach
- Cherokee Parks, former NBA basketball player
- Tony Parrish, former NFL football player
- Joe Penny, actor
- Justin Sellers, infielder for the Pittsburgh Pirates
- Jerry Simon, American Israeli basketball player

== Academics ==
Marina offers many academic programs, and they are ranked as the number 1 school in Huntington Beach. They have the top ranked academics combined with real-world skills, Over 20 Advanced Placement class offerings, Award Winning Robotics Program, and Dual enrollment pathways, including Criminal Justice and Nursing. Marina is the only school in HBUHSD to earn the College Board Honor Roll.

== Former principals ==
- Glen Dysinger: 1963-1971
- Charles Weaver: 1971-1979
- Robert Barbot: 1979-1981
- Paul Berger: 1981-1985
- Lee Eastwood: 1985
- Ira Toibin: 1985-1989
- Jim Keating: 1989-1995
- Carol Osbrink: 1995-2002
- Steve Roderick: 2002-2007
- Paul Morrow: 2007-2015
- Jessie Marion: 2015-2021
- Morgan Smith: 2021-2024
- Tim Floyd: 2024–2026
- Rob Rasmussen: 2026-present
