= Stuart James Hutchings =

Welsh chess player (born 1951)

Personal information
- Born: 8 May 1951 (age 75) Barnstaple, England

Chess career
- Country: Wales
- Title: FIDE Master (1990)
- Peak rating: 2340 (January 1977)

Stuart James Hutchings (born 8 May 1951) is a Welsh chess FIDE Master (FM) and two-time Welsh Chess Championship winner (1973, 1990).

== Biography ==
Stuart James Hutchings twice jointly won the Welsh Chess Championship, in 1973 and 1990. In 1970, he won the Plymouth Chess Club Championship.

Stuart James Hutchings played for Wales in the Chess Olympiads:

- in 1972, at the second board in the 20th Chess Olympiad in Skopje (+5, =10, -4),
- in 1974, at the second board in the 21st Chess Olympiad in Nice (+6, =5, -7),
- in 1976, at the third board in the 22nd Chess Olympiad in Haifa (+3, =5, -2),
- in 1978, at the third board in the 23rd Chess Olympiad in Buenos Aires (+2, =8, -2),
- in 1980, at the third board in the 24th Chess Olympiad in La Valletta (+4, =2, -5),
- in 1990, at the fourth board in the 29th Chess Olympiad in Novi Sad (+5, =4, -2).
