= Kaj Rosell =

Danish chess player (born 1947)

Kaj Rosell (born 9 May 1947) is a Danish chess player, Danish Chess Championship medalist (1976).

== Biography ==
In the mid-1970s, Kaj Rosell was one of the leading Danish chess players. He participated three times in the finals of Danish Chess Championships and reached her best result in 1976, when he shared 2nd-7th place. Kaj Rosell was participant of major chess tournaments: Rasmussen memorials in Randers (1970 and 1973), tournaments in Aarhus (1975 and 1976), Holmsgaard memorial in Norresundnby (1978). As member of the Vejlby-Risskov SK team, he participated in the 1st official European Chess Club Cup (1976). The Danish team reached the quarterfinals and lost to one of the winners of the tournament - Burevestnik Moscow (USSR).

Kaj Rosell played for Denmark in the Chess Olympiad:

- In 1976, at first reserve board in the 22nd Chess Olympiad in Haifa (+3, =4, -1).

Kaj Rosell played for Denmark in the Nordic Chess Cup:

- In 1976, at second board in the 7th Nordic Chess Cup in Bremen (+0, =5, -0) and won team bronze medal.
