= John Trevelyan (chess player) =

Welsh chess player

Personal information
- Born: 13 March 1948 (age 78) Bridgend, Wales

Chess career
- Country: Wales
- Peak rating: 2243 (July 2006)

John Trevelyan (born 13 March 1948) is a Welsh chess player, three-times Welsh Chess Championship winner (1973, 1979, 2006).

== Biography ==
John Trevelyan has won three times in the Welsh Chess Championships: 1966, 1979 (jointly), and 2006.

John Trevelyan played for Wales in the Chess Olympiads:

- In 1974, at second reserve board in the 21st Chess Olympiad in Nice (+2, =1, -5),
- In 1978, at first reserve board in the 23rd Chess Olympiad in Buenos Aires (+1, =3, -5),
- In 1988, at second reserve board in the 28th Chess Olympiad in Thessaloniki (+2, =0, -0).

John Trevelyan played for Wales in the European Team Chess Championships:

- In 1989, at sixth reserve board in the 9th European Team Chess Championship in Haifa (+0, =0, -5),
- In 2003, at fourth board in the 14th European Team Chess Championship in Plovdiv (+0, =2, -4),
- In 2005, at fourth board in the 15th European Team Chess Championship in Gothenburg (+1, =0, -5),
- In 2007, at first reserve board in the 16th European Team Chess Championship in Heraklion (+1, =0, -4).
