= 6th Women's Chess Olympiad =

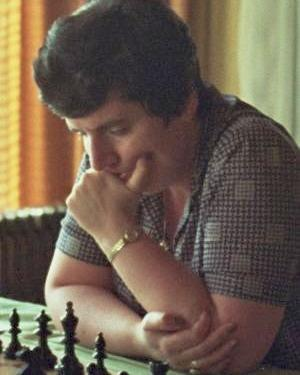
Nona Gaprindashvili

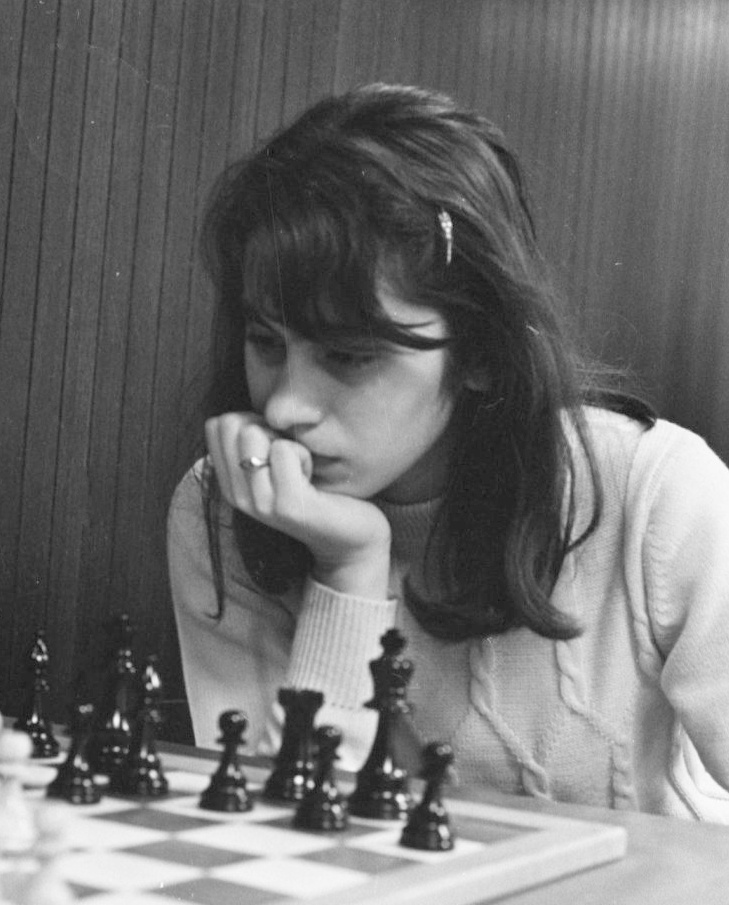
Nana Alexandria

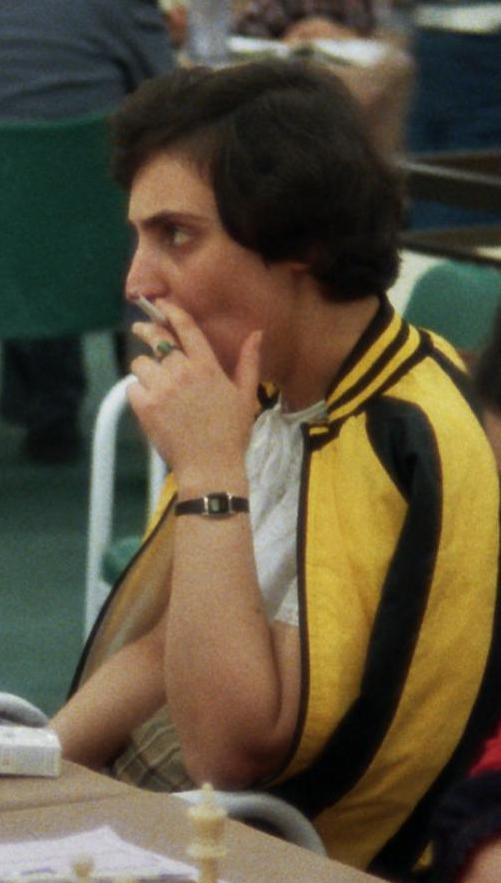
Irina Levitina

The winning Soviet Union team

The 6th Women's Chess Olympiad, organized by FIDE, took place on 15 September to 7 October 1974 in Medellín, Colombia.

Twenty-five nations took part in the women's Olympiad. From five preliminary groups the teams were split into three finals.

The Soviet Union won.

== Preliminaries ==
- Group 1:

Final	Country	1	2	3	4	5	+	−	=	Points
«A»	Soviet Union	-	2	2	2	2	4	0	0	8
«A»	Canada	0	-	2	1	2	2	1	1	5
«B»	Austria	0	0	-	2	1½	2	2	0	3½
«B»	Colombia	0	1	0	-	1½	1	2	1	2½
«C»	Puerto Rico	0	0	½	½	-	0	4	0	1

- Group 2:

Final	Country	1	2	3	4	5	+	−	=	Points
«A»	Romania	-	1	2	2	2	3	0	1	7
«A»	Netherlands	1	-	1	1½	2	2	0	2	5½
«B»	United States	0	1	-	2	2	2	1	1	5
«B»	Japan	0	½	0	-	1½	1	3	0	2
«C»	Panama	0	0	0	½	-	0	4	0	½

- Group 3:

Final	Country	1	2	3	4	5	+	−	=	Points
«A»	Hungary	-	1½	2	1½	2	4	0	0	7
«A»	England	½	-	1	1½	2	2	1	1	5
«B»	Israel	0	1	-	2	2	2	1	1	5
«B»	Brazil	½	½	0	-	2	1	3	0	3
«C»	Monaco	0	0	0	0	-	0	4	0	0

- Group 4:

Final	Country	1	2	3	4	5	+	−	=	Points
«A»	Yugoslavia	-	1	1½	2	2	3	0	1	6½
«A»	Bulgaria	1	-	1½	1	2	2	0	2	5½
«B»	Spain	½	½	-	1	2	1	2	1	4
«B»	Finland	0	1	1	-	1½	1	1	2	3½
«C»	Mexico	0	0	0	½	-	0	4	0	½

- Group 5:

Final	Country	1	2	3	4	5	+	−	=	Points
«A»	Czechoslovakia	-	1½	2	2	2	4	0	0	7½
«A»	West Germany	½	-	1½	2	2	3	1	0	6
«B»	Sweden	0	½	-	1	2	1	2	1	3½
«B»	Ireland	0	0	1	-	1½	1	2	1	2½
«C»	Iraq	0	0	0	½	-	0	4	0	½

== Finals ==
Final A
#	Country	Players	Average rating	Points	MP	Playoff score
1	Soviet Union	Nona Gaprindashvili, Nana Alexandria, Irina Levitina	2380	13½	14	3
2	Romania	Elisabeta Polihroniade, Gertrude Baumstark, Margareta Teodorescu	2233	13½	14	1
3	Bulgaria	Tatjana Lematschko, Antonina Georgieva, Venka Asenova	2233	13	14	
4	Hungary	Mária Ivánka, Zsuzsa Verőci, Mária Porubszky-Angyalosine	2300	13	13	
5	Netherlands	Corry Vreeken, Ada van der Giessen, Erika Belle	2115	9½		
6	Czechoslovakia	Květa Eretová, Štěpánka Vokřálová, Margita Polanová	2195	9		
7	Yugoslavia	Milunka Lazarević, Katarina Jovanović, Vlasta Kalchbrenner	2203	7½		
8	England	Anne Sunnucks, Elaine Pritchard, Sheila Jackson	2068	4	3	
9	West Germany	Anni Laakmann, Ursula Wasnetsky	2103	4	3	
10	Canada	Smilja Vujosevic, Claire Demers, Marie Bernard	2033	3		

Final B
#	Country	Players	Average rating	Points	MP
11	Spain	Pepita Ferrer Lucas, María del Pino García Padrón, Nieves García Vicente	1938	13½	16
12	Israel	Olga Podrazhanskaya, Lea Nudelman	2105	13½	16
13	Brazil	Ruth Cardoso, Ivone Moysés, Norma Snitkowsky	2008	11	
14	United States	Mona May Karff, Ruth Herstein, Ruth Haring	2048	10½	
15	Sweden	Solveig Haraldsson, Jolanta Dahlin, Ingrid Svensson	2025	9½	
16	Austria	Ingeborg Kattinger, Wilma Samt, Alfreda Hausner	1965	8½	
17	Colombia	Ilse Guggenberger, Rosalba Patiño, Lilith Velásquez	–	8	
18	Finland	Johanna Tuomainen, Sirkka-Liisa Vuorenpää, Marjatta Palasto	1880	6	
19	Japan	Hyroko Maeda, Kyoto Watanabe, Miyoko Watai	1825	5	
20	Ireland	Dorren O'Siochrú, Aileen Noonan, Ann Shouldice	1830	4½	

Final C
#	Country	Players	Points	MP
21	Mexico	Aida Camps de Ocampo, Gloria Vega, Catalina Batres	7½	
22	Puerto Rico	Ruth Rodríguez Ramírez, Sara Castellón de Santana, Dyalma Flores Cortés	7	
23	Iraq	Z. A. Al-Hariry, Shemin Al-Soud, Suad Said Al-Sarraj	5	5
24	Colombia "B"	N. Betancur, Maria Idalia Zapata, Doris Soler	5	5
25	Monaco	Martine Cellario, Anne Maria Macia	4	
26	Panama	Ana Ríos Planes, Elzebir Castillo, Lidia Ferrer	1½	

=== Final «A» ===
№	Country	1	2	3	4	5	6	7	8	9	10	+	−	=	Points
1	Soviet Union	-	1	1½	1½	½	1	2	2	2	2	6	1	2	13½
2	Romania	1	-	2	1	1	1	1½	2	2	2	5	0	4	13½
3	Bulgaria	½	0	-	1½	1½	2	2	1½	2	2	7	2	0	13
4	Hungary	½	1	½	-	2	2	1½	1½	2	2	6	2	1	13
5	Netherlands	1½	1	½	0	-	0	1	2	1½	2	4	3	2	9½
6	Czechoslovakia	1	1	0	0	2	-	1	1	1½	1½	3	2	4	9
7	Yugoslavia	0	½	0	½	1	1	-	2	1½	1	2	4	3	7½
8	England	0	0	½	½	0	1	0	-	1	1	0	6	3	4
9	West Germany	0	0	0	0	½	½	½	1	-	1½	1	7	1	4
10	Canada	0	0	0	0	0	½	1	1	½	-	0	7	2	3

- Play-off for gold: Soviet Union-Romania 3-1 (2-0, 1-1)

=== Final «B» ===
№	Country	11	12	13	14	15	16	17	18	19	20	+	−	=	Points
11	Spain	-	1½	1½	1½	2	1½	1½	1	2	1	7	0	2	13½
12	Israel	½	-	1	1½	1	1½	2	2	2	2	6	1	2	13½
13	Brazil	½	1	-	1	1	1	1	2	1½	2	3	1	5	11
14	United States	½	½	1	-	0	1½	1	2	2	2	4	3	2	10½
15	Sweden	0	1	1	2	-	1	2	0	1½	1	3	2	4	9½
16	Austria	½	½	1	½	1	-	½	1½	1½	1½	3	4	2	8½
17	Colombia	½	0	1	1	0	1½	-	1	1½	1½	3	3	3	8
18	Finland	1	0	0	0	2	½	1	-	1	½	1	5	3	6
19	Japan	0	0	½	0	½	½	½	1	-	2	1	7	1	5
20	Ireland	1	0	0	0	1	½	½	1½	0	-	1	6	2	4½

=== Final «C» ===
№	Country	21	22	23	24	25	26	+	−	=	Points
21	Mexico	-	1	1½	2	1	2	3	0	2	7½
22	Puerto Rico	1	-	1	2	1	2	2	0	3	7
23	Iraq	½	1	-	1	1½	1	1	1	3	5
24	Colombia "B"	0	0	1	-	2	2	2	2	1	5
25	Monaco	1	1	½	0	-	1½	1	2	2	4
26	Panama	0	0	1	0	½	-	0	4	1	1½

== Individual medals ==
- Board 1: (Soviet Union) Nona Gaprindashvili 10 / 12 = 83.3%
- Board 2: (Soviet Union) Nana Alexandria 6½ / 8 = 81.3%
- Reserve: (Soviet Union) Irina Levitina 8 / 10 = 80.0%
