= Ingrid Keményová-Svensson =

Swedish chess player (born 1947)

Personal information
- Born: 8 September 1947 (age 78)

Chess career
- Country: Sweden
- Peak rating: 2115 (January 1990)

Ingrid Keményová-Svensson (8 September 1947 – March 2022), was a Swedish chess player, Women's Chess Olympiad individual silver medalist (1974).

== Biography ==
In the first half of 1970s Ingrid Keményová-Svensson was one of Sweden's leading chess players.

Ingrid Keményová-Svensson played for Sweden in the Women's Chess Olympiads:

- In 1972, at second board in the 5th Chess Olympiad (women) in Skopje (+3, =1, -4),
- In 1974, at first reserve board in the 6th Chess Olympiad (women) in Medellín (+4, =3, -2) and won individual silver medal,
- In 1976, at second board in the 7th Chess Olympiad (women) in Haifa (+4, =1, -3).

Ingrid Keményová-Svensson played for Sweden in the Nordic Chess Cups:

- In 1972, at sixth board in the 3rd Nordic Chess Cup in Großenbrode (+2, =0, -2),
- In 1976, at sixth board in the 7th Nordic Chess Cup in Bremen (+1, =4, -0) and won team gold medal.

Since 1990 Ingrid Keményová-Svensson has rarely participated in chess tournaments. She was a practitioner psychiatrist in Stockholm.
