= Jaime Vaglio Muñoz =

Costa Rican chess player (born 1956)

Personal information
- Born: 2 June 1956 (age 70)

Chess career
- Country: Costa Rica
- Title: International Master (2002)
- Peak rating: 2286 (January 2002)

Jaime Vaglio Muñoz (born 2 June 1956) is a Costa Rican chess International Master (IM, 2002), three-times Costa Rican Chess Championship winner (1973, 1976, 1986).

== Biography ==
From the begin of 1970s to the mid-1980s, Jaime Vaglio Muñoz was one of the leading chess players in Costa Rica. He three times won Costa Rican Chess Championships: 1973, 1976, and 1986. In 1975 in Santo Domingo Jaime Vaglio Muñoz participated in World Chess Championships Caribbean-Central American Zonal tournament. Also he twice played for Costa Rica in CACAC Team Chess Championship (1972, 1973).

Jaime Vaglio Muñoz played for Costa Rica in the Chess Olympiad:

- In 1976, at first board in the 22nd Chess Olympiad in Haifa (+1, =6, -3),
- In 1986, at first board in the 27th Chess Olympiad in Dubai (+2, =6, -2).

Jaime Vaglio Muñoz played for Costa Rica in the World Student Team Chess Championships:

- In 1976, at first board in the 21st World Student Team Chess Championship in Caracas (+0, =5, -5),
- In 1977, at third board in the 22nd World Student Team Chess Championship in Mexico City (+3, =6, -3).

In 2002, Jaime Vaglio Muñoz was awarded the FIDE International Master (IM) title.
