= Hazel Brunker =

Welsh chess player (1932–2025)

Personal information
- Born: 16 October 1932
- Died: 28 July 2025 (aged 92)

Chess career
- Country: Wales

Hazel Patricia Brunker (16 October 1932 – 28 July 2025) was a Welsh chess player, eight-times Welsh Women's Chess Championship winner (1969, 1970, 1972, 1973, 1982, 1985, 1989, 1990).

== Biography ==
From the late 1960s to the early 1990s, Brunker was one of the best chess female player in Wales. She won eight times in the Welsh Women's Chess Championships: 1969 (jointly), 1970, 1972, 1973, 1982 (jointly), 1985, 1989, and 1990.

Brunker played for Wales in the Chess Olympiads:

- In 1976, at second board in the 7th Chess Olympiad (women) in Haifa (+2, =2, -6),
- In 1978, at third board in the 8th Chess Olympiad (women) in Buenos Aires (+2, =3, -5),
- In 1980, at first reserve board in the 9th Chess Olympiad (women) in Valletta (+2, =1, -5),
- In 1982, at third board in the 10th Chess Olympiad (women) in Lucerne (+2, =1, -3).

Brunker died on 28 July 2025, at the age of 92.
