= Thorbjørn Rosenlund =

Danish chess player (born 1951)

Personal information
- Born: 18 June 1951 (age 75)

Chess career
- Country: Denmark

Thorbjørn Rosenlund (born 18 June 1951), is a Danish chess player, four-times Nordic Chess Cup medalist (1971, 1974, 1975, 1976).

== Biography ==
From the mid-1970s to the mid-1980s Thorbjørn Rosenlund was one of the leading Danish chess players. As member of the Vejlby-Risskov SK (1976) and Nordre SK (1983) teams, he participated in the European Chess Club Cups. In 1976 Danish team reached the quarterfinals and lost to one of the winners of the tournament - Burevestnik Moscow (USSR).

Thorbjørn Rosenlund played for Denmark in the Chess Olympiad:

- In 1976, at fourth board in the 22nd Chess Olympiad in Haifa (+3, =2, -5).

Thorbjørn Rosenlund played for Denmark in the European Team Chess Championship preliminaries:

- In 1977, at seventh board in the 6th European Team Chess Championship preliminaries (+0, =2, -2).

Thorbjørn Rosenlund played for Denmark in the Nordic Chess Cups:

- In 1971, at fifth board in the 2nd Nordic Chess Cup in Großenbrode (+3, =0, -2) and won team silver medal,
- In 1974, at fifth board in the 5th Nordic Chess Cup in Eckernförde (+4, =0, -1) and won team silver and individual gold medals,
- In 1975, at third board in the 6th Nordic Chess Cup in Hindås (+4, =0, -1) and won team silver medal,
- In 1976, at third board in the 7th Nordic Chess Cup in Bremen (+3, =2, -0) and won team bronze and individual gold medals.
