= Lea Nudelman =

Israeli chess player (born 1955)

Personal information
- Native name: לאה נודלמן
- Born: 11 May 1955 (age 71) Simferopol, Ukrainian SSR

Chess career
- Country: Soviet Union; Israel
- Peak rating: 2175 (January 1990)

Lea Nudelman (Hebrew: לאה נודלמן; born 11 May 1955) is an Israeli chess player who won Women's Chess Olympiad team and individual gold medals.

== Chess career ==
Lea Nudelman participated in the Soviet Union youth chess championship, where achieved the best result in 1972 in Chernihiv, when taken the 7th place. She played for Ukraine in the Championship of the USSR team juniors and twice won - in 1970 in Nevinnomyssk and in 1972 in Kiev. In 1971 Lea Nudelman won the Crimean Oblast Women's Chess Championship. She also is Ukrainian women's correspondence chess championship winner (1968-1970).

Moved to Israel in 1972. Participating in multiple Israeli women's chess championships.

Lea Nudelman played for Israel in the Women's Chess Olympiads:

- In 1974, at second board in the 6th Chess Olympiad (women) in Medellín (+8, =1, -4),
- In 1976, at first reserve board in the 7th Chess Olympiad (women) in Haifa (+6, =1, -0) and won team and individual gold medals,
- In 1980, at first reserve board in the 9th Chess Olympiad (women) in Valletta (+4, =5, -0) and won individual bronze medal.

Lately she lives in France and rarely played in chess tournaments.

== Literature ==
- Игорь Бердичевский. Шахматная еврейская энциклопедия. Москва: Русский шахматный дом, 2016. ISBN 978-5-94693-503-6
