= Irwin Lipnowski =

Canadian chess player

Personal information
- Born: May 2, 1946 (age 80)

Chess career
- Country: Canada
- Title: FIDE Master
- Peak rating: 2400 (January 1975)

Irwin Lipnowski (born May 2, 1946) is a Canadian chess FIDE Master.

== Biography ==
Lipnowski, who grew up in Winnipeg, was one of Canada's strongest chess players of the 1960s and 1970s. He was awarded the FIDE Master title in 1983.

His competitive accomplishments include:

- 1960, 1962 Winner, Manitoba Junior Championship and in 1959 shared first with Michael Nozick
- 1963, 1978, and 2001 Canadian Chess Championship, placing 6th, 8th, and 17th, respectively
- 1969 Winner, Ontario Open
- 1971 Played fourth board for Canada at the World Student Team Chess Championship in Mayagüez, scoring +1, =2, -2; the team won the bronze medal
- 1974 Placed 7th in the Pan American Chess Championship in Winnipeg
- 1976 Played first reserve board ( scoring +1, =4, -1) on the Canadian men's team at the 22nd Chess Olympiad in Haifa; the team's eighth place finish was its best ever
- 1977 Winner, Manitoba Championship
- 1999 Winner, Manitoba Open
- 2000 Captain and coach of the Canadian team at the World Youth Championship, Oropesa del Mar, Spain

An economics professor, Lipnowski is a faculty member of the University of Manitoba.
