= Evelyn Cisneros =

American ballerina

Evelyn Cisneros-Legate
- Born: Evelyn Cisneros; November 18, 1958 (age 67); Long Beach, California
- Education: Mills College and University of California at Monterey Bay
- Occupation: ballerina
- Spouse: Dr. Stephen Legate

Evelyn Cisneros-Legate (born Evelyn Cisneros on November 18, 1958 in Long Beach, California) is an American ballerina. Evelyn, who is Mexican American, is considered the first prima ballerina in the United States of Hispanic heritage. She holds an honorary doctorate from Mills College and the University of California at Monterey Bay.

== Background ==
Evelyn was raised in a family of migrant workers strongly involved with the Hispanic community. She was always encouraged to be proud of her heritage. As a young child her mother had her take ballet classes in an attempt to overcome her penchant for shyness. Evelyn’s peers classified her as an outcast due to her skin color and shyness. She discovered that dance was a way of expression, with the movements performing the work her mouth could not. With this revelation, Evelyn looked up to her first dance teacher, Phyllis Cyr, as a role model. To pay for the expensive classes, Evelyn's mother made the decision to work as a receptionist at Cyr’s studio. Throughout high school, Evelyn took even seven classes in a row without breaks, so she could attend ballet class. She began to study ballet at eight years of age. Cisneros-Legate received a scholarship for the summer in 1974 to the School of American Ballet. She did an internship with the San Francisco Ballet in 1976.

== Career ==
Evelyn's left hip was too tight, and her left foot was pigeon-toed. Despite this potential downfall for finding a career, as ballet is grounded in outward rotation, she overcame what could have become a disability through a strong work ethic. Cisneros-Legate joined the company of the San Francisco Ballet in 1977 where she danced for 23 years, performing nearly every starring role in the company's repertoire. This company was under the directorship of Co-Artistic Directors, Lew Christensen and Michael Smuin. Cisneros-Legate performed three nights a week while studying with the company, making $5 for her work. Throughout her time in the corps, she painted her neck, chest, arms, and face, as she was told to lighten her dark skin with makeup. Evelyn had performed her original roles in national television broadcasts of A Song for Dead Warriors and The Tempest, as well as Cinderella and noteworthy “live broadcast” from the White House in 1982. In 1992, Cisneros-Legate was named in Hispanic Business's "100 Influentials". In 1992 Cisneros-Legate was also honored by Huntington Beach, California, where she had attended Marina High School, for her contribution to art during the city's fifth annual arts awards program. She was named as an outstanding performing artist. Even featured on the covers of Ballet News, Dance Magazine, and Hispanic Magazine, she was considered as the “fairest flower of the ballet”, by San Francisco columnist Herb Caen. She grew to become San Francisco Ballet’s “prima-ballerina” and an international star under Lew Christensen, Michael Smuin, and Helgi Tómasson.

Following retirement from the San Francisco Ballet in May 1999, a Gala performance followed in her honor, and as a celebration, a documentary of her life was published, entitled Evelyn Cisneros, Moving On. She then became host of KQED’s monthly current events program “Bay Windows” and became an artistic consultant with San Francisco Ballet. This role had her hosting and providing content for Family Connection workshops, pre-performance talks, Community Matinees, and the Ballet’s popular Casual Friday Program.

As early as 2000, Evelyn has taught at summer intensive courses for the Kansas City Ballet, The Boston Ballet School, a week long intensive in Carmel Ca., as well as teaching the New York City Ballet Workout at the Bay Club in San Francisco twice weekly and for Smuin Ballet on occasion. She has staged ballets for Michael Smuin and Val Caniparoli for the following ballet companies: Pacific Northwest Ballet, State Theatre Ballet in South Africa, Northern Ballet Theatre in Leeds England, Ballet Florida, Kansas City Ballet, and San Francisco Ballet. She also has taught company class for the following ballet companies: Boston Ballet, Pacific Northwest Ballet, State Theatre Ballet in South Africa, Northern Ballet Theatre in Leeds England, Ballet Florida, and the Kansas City Ballet.

In November 2001, Cisneros-Legate was appointed Ballet Education Coordinator in the San Francisco Ballet Center for Dance Education. As a coordinator, she hosted and provided content for Family Connection workshops, pre-performance talks, Community Matinees, movement workshops and discussions for SFBCDE’s popular Family Connections Series, and for Dance Education on Tour. In addition, as a team of educators training volunteers involved in the IMPACT program, Evelyn prepared online study guide content to educate teachers and students about the main elements of ballet, including music and terminology. In 2003, Evelyn published a book, “Ballet for Dummies”, along with co-author Scott Speck. In 2006, Cisneros-Legate was appointed academy director of Ballet Pacifica in Irvine, California. As Artistic Director, she produced The Nutcracker performed at the Barclay Theater for 21 performances. At the start of January 2010, she was principal of Boston Ballet's Marblehead Studio. She led the Boston Ballet school from 32 to 360 students. She also has served as artistic director of the after-school programming at the National Dance Institute. This nonprofit offers free dance lessons to nearly 9,500 students across the state through the Santa Fe Dance Barns, Hiland Theater, and the public schools. Cisneros-Legate also was adjunct professor at Endicott College building a ballet curriculum for groups like the YMCA’s gymnastics teams in Marblehead.

Evelyn Cisneros-Legate married retired principal dancer Stephen Legate, with whom she has two children. Dr. Stephen Legate is currently a chiropractor. The family moved to Albuquerque in 2013. Here, Evelyn accepted the position of Artistic Director of The National Dance Institute of New Mexico in Albuquerque at The Hiland, where she built the newly renovated Hiland after school program. After starting with 235 students at the beginning of her position, the number had risen to a student body of 470. She is also responsible for managing 32 instructors, 3 pianists, 2 administrators and for teaching and overseeing the 10 studios that make up The Hiland. Additionally, she is in charge of building the ballet program and directing the Company Xcel and newly appointed Jr. Company Xcel. In 2014 Cisneros-Legate was named by the Huffington Post as one of the "17 Ballet Icons Who Are Changing The Face Of Dance Today."

As of September 2020, Evelyn was appointed as the new Director of the Frederick Quinney Lawson Ballet West Academy, running all four campuses of the school. She started at the San Francisco Ballet as a student of the Harold Christensen regime, was brought into the company by Lew Christensen, and then Willam Christensen, the Ballet West founder, appointed her as the new Director. Artistic Director of the Academy, Adam Sklute, mentioned her appointment as the dynamic next step in building Ballet West Academy to a world-renowned institution for dance education.

== Major roles ==
- Princess Aurora in Sleeping Beauty
- Odette/Odile in Swan Lake
- The Sugar Plum Fairy in The Nutcracker
- Cinderella in Cinderella
- Juliet in Romeo and Juliet
- Principal ballerina in Themes and Variations
- Principal role in Lambarena
- Lise in La Fille mal Gardee
