= Mary Davis =

Mary Davis may refer to:

- Moll Davis (Mary Davis, c. 1648–1708), actress and mistress of Charles II of Great Britain
- Mary E. P. Davis (1840–1924), American nursing instructor
- Mary Davis (artist) (1866–1941), English artist
- Mary Davis (actress) (1870–1944), American silent film actress
- Mary Gould Davis (1882–1956), American author, librarian, storyteller and editor
- Mary Lund Davis (1922–2008), modernist architect
- Mary Davis (activist) (born 1954), Special Olympics organiser and candidate in the Irish presidential election, 2011
- Mary Bond Davis (born 1958), American singer, actor and dancer
- Mary Hayes Davis (c. 1884–1948), American writer, newspaper editor and publisher
- Mary Elizabeth Moragne Davis (1815–1903), American diarist and author
- Mary Fenn Robinson Davis (1824–1886), American reformer, spiritualist lecturer, and poet
- Mary Davis (singer) (born 1958), American singer of the S.O.S. Band

== See also ==
- Mary Davys (1670s–1732), Irish novelist and playwright
- Mary Davies (disambiguation)
