= Bernal González Acosta =

Costa Rican chess grandmaster (born 1973)

Bernal González
Personal information
- Born: Bernal Manuel González Acosta; 10 June 1973 (age 53) San José, Costa Rica

Chess career
- Country: Costa Rica
- Title: Grandmaster (2015)
- FIDE rating: 2453 (November 2026)
- Peak rating: 2502 (January 2015)

Bernal Manuel González Acosta (born 10 June 1973) is a Costa Rican chess player who has held the title of Grandmaster since 2015.

== Chess career ==
Since the early 1990s, González has been one of the leading Costa Rican chess players. He won his first Costa Rican Chess Championship in 1990, followed by further national titles in 1991, 1993, 1995, 1996, 2000, 2001, 2003, 2005, and 2006. Between 1990 and 2012, he represented Costa Rica in eight Chess Olympiads (including three times on board one), achieving his best individual result at the 31st Chess Olympiad in Moscow in 1994, where he won the individual silver medal on board three.

His tournament successes include sharing third place in the 2000 zonal tournament in Valencia (behind Leinier Domínguez and Alonso Zapata, alongside Jesús Nogueiras), sharing first place in San Salvador in 2001 (with Juan Carlos González), sharing first place in Panama City in 2006 (with Leonardo Valdés), and winning first place in the Rubén Darío tournament in Managua in 2014.

He achieved his highest FIDE rating of 2502 in January 2015, ranking first among Costa Rican players at the time.
