= Emmanuel Rayner =

Welsh chess player (born 1958)

Personal information
- Born: 11 June 1958 (age 68) London, England

Chess career
- Country: Wales
- Title: FIDE Master (2012)
- Peak rating: 2345 (January 1978)

Emmanuel Rayner (born 11 June 1958) is a British chess player and FIDE Master. He won the Welsh Chess Championship in 1976.

Dr Rayner studied mathematics at Trinity College, Cambridge and obtained a PhD in computer science from Stockholm University. He is currently working on Regulus-based projects at Geneva University in Switzerland.

He has stated on Goodreads that his favourite novels are Anthony Powell's saga A Dance to the Music of Time.

He has also published two humour books entitled What Pooh Might Have Said to Dante (2012) and If Research Were Romance and other Implausible Conjectures (2013), compiling book reviews originally written by him for the Goodreads.com social website. He has also written the humorous books The New Adventures of Socrates: An Extravagance and Everything You Need to Know to Write a Work of Satire in Trump's America. In addition to these, he has written two books on the Regulus Grammar Compiler, called Putting Linguistics into Speech Recognition: The Regulus Grammar Compiler (Studies in Computational Linguistics) and The Spoken Language Translator.
