= Solveig Haraldsson =

Swedish chess player

Personal information
- Born: 1939
- Died: 1994 or 1995

Chess career
- Country: Sweden

Solveig Haraldsson (1939 – late 1994 or early 1995), was a Swedish chess player, Nordic Chess Cup winner (1971).

== Biography ==
From the end of 1960s to the end of 1970s Solveig Haraldsson was one of Sweden's leading female chess players. In 1969, in Veselí nad Moravou she participated in Women's World Chess Championship European Zonal tournament.

Solveig Haraldsson played for Sweden in the Women's Chess Olympiads:

- In 1972, at first board in the 5th Chess Olympiad (women) in Skopje (+2, =1, -5),
- In 1974, at first board in the 6th Chess Olympiad (women) in Medellín (+1, =0, -6).

Solveig Haraldsson played for Sweden in the Nordic Chess Cups:

- In 1971, at sixth board in the 2nd Nordic Chess Cup in Großenbrode (+0, =2, -3) and won team gold medal,
- In 1973, at fifth board in the 4th Nordic Chess Cup in Ribe (+2, =2, -1) and won team silver medal,
- In 1975, at fifth board in the 6th Nordic Chess Cup in Hindås (+1, =1, -3).
