= Kim Commons =

American chess player (1951–2015)

Personal information
- Born: 23 July 1951 Lancaster, California, U.S.
- Died: 23 June 2015 (aged 63) Mesa, Arizona, U.S.

Chess career
- Country: United States
- Title: International Master (1976)
- Peak rating: 2485 (January 1978)

Kim Commons (23 July 1951 — 23 June 2015) was an American chess International Master (IM) and Chess Olympiad winner.

== Early life and education ==
Commons was born on July 23, 1951 in Lancaster, California. He grew up in Huntington Beach and graduated from Marina High School in the late 1960s. He went on to graduate from UCLA in 1973 with a degree in physics.

Commons played first board for the Marina High School chess team which won the Orange County High School Chess Championship in his junior and senior years, beating a strong Servite High School (Anaheim, CA) both years.

== Chess career ==
In 1972, Kim Commons won the California State Chess Championship, ahead of James Tarjan. In 1974, he tied with Peter Biyiasas for the American Open title. In 1976, he won three International Chess Tournaments in Bulgaria: Varna, Plovdiv and Primorsko.

Commons played for the United States in the 22nd Chess Olympiad in Haifa, winning team and individual gold medals with six wins, three draws and no losses.

He also played for the United States in two World student team championships:

- In 1972, on the second reserve board in the 19th World Student Team Chess Championship in Graz (+6, =3, -2),
- In 1977, on first board in the 22nd World Student Team Chess Championship in Mexico City (+3, =3, -2).

In 1976, he was awarded the FIDE International Master (IM) title.

In the late 1970s, Commons stopped playing professional chess and began to focus on a career in real estate. For the second half of his life he lived in Arizona, where he was the founder and owner of Club Red, a Mesa music club.

== Personal life and death ==
Commons was married to Kim Ellen Commons in 1975, but later divorced. He died of a stroke on June 23, 2015 in Mesa, Arizona.
