= Beryl Hughes =

Welsh chess player

- Country: Wales
- Born: 1931; Rhondda Valley, South Wales, United Kingdom
- Died: 13 November 2017 (aged 85–86)

Beryl Hughes (née Jarman, 1931 – 13 November 2017) was a Welsh chess player and writer, two-times Welsh Women's Chess Championship winner (1975, 1999).

== Biography ==
Beryl Hughes was educated at Dursley Grammar School in Gloucestershire and Cardiff University. In the 1970s she was one of the best chess female player in Wales. She has twice won Welsh Women's Chess Championship in 1975 and 1999.

Beryl Hughes played for Wales in the Chess Olympiad:

- In 1976, at first reserve board in the 7th Chess Olympiad (women) in Haifa (+0, =0, -4).

In 2013, Beryl Hughes published a book about identity of Shakespeare’s friends – Shakespeare's Friends Revealed.
