= Deborah Evans-Quek =

Welsh chess player

Personal information
- Born: 18 February 1961 (age 65) Bangor, Wales, United Kingdom

Chess career
- Country: Wales
- Peak rating: 2067 (July 2002)

Deborah Evans-Quek (née Evans, formerly Cooper, born 18 February 1961) is a Welsh chess player, five-times Welsh Women's Chess Championship winner (1977, 1979, 1991, 2000, 2003), Chess Olympiad individual silver medal winner (1986).

== Biography ==
From the end of 1970s to the mid-2000s Deborah Evans-Quek was one of the best chess female player in Wales. She twice participated in European Girls' Junior Chess Championships (1979, 1980). Deborah Evans-Quek has won Welsh Women's Chess Championship five times: 1977, 1979, 1991 (jointly), 2000, and 2003. In 1993, in Delden she participated in Women's World Chess Championship West European Zonal tournament.

Deborah Evans-Quek played for Wales in the Chess Olympiads:

- In 1978, at second board in the 8th Chess Olympiad (women) in Buenos Aires (+5, =2, -5),
- In 1980, at second board in the 9th Chess Olympiad (women) in Valletta (+7, =0, -5),
- In 1982, at first board in the 10th Chess Olympiad (women) in Lucerne (+4, =2, -5),
- In 1984, at second board in the 26th Chess Olympiad (women) in Thessaloniki (+4, =4, -3),
- In 1986, at second board in the 27th Chess Olympiad (women) in Dubai (+7, =2, -1) and won individual silver medal,
- In 1988, at second board in the 28th Chess Olympiad (women) in Thessaloniki (+5, =0, -7),
- In 1990, at first board in the 29th Chess Olympiad (women) in Novi Sad (+5, =1, -6),
- In 1992, at second board in the 30th Chess Olympiad (women) in Manila (+5, =1, -5),
- In 2000, at second board in the 34th Chess Olympiad (women) in Istanbul (+5, =2, -4),
- In 2002, at first board in the 35th Chess Olympiad (women) in Bled (+3, =1, -7),
- In 2004, at second board in the 36th Chess Olympiad (women) in Calvià (+0, =4, -4).

Deborah Evans-Quek played for Wales in the European Women's Team Chess Championship:

- In 1992, at first board in the 1st European Team Chess Championship (women) in Debrecen (+1, =0, -6).
