= Wilsaida Díaz =

Dominican chess player (born 1991)

Personal information
- Born: September 19, 1991 (age 35)

Chess career
- Country: Dominican Republic
- Title: Woman FIDE Master (2014)
- Peak rating: 1914 (May 2016)

Wilsaida Pieranlly Diaz Cesar (born in 1991) is a Dominican chess player. She is a Woman FIDE Master (WFM) since 2014. She is the best female player in the Dominican Republic and her highest rating was 1914 (in May 2016).

She won the Dominican Women championship in the years: 2013, 2015, and 2016.

She played on board 4 in the Women chess Olympiad in the years 2014, 2016 and 2018.
