= Costa Rican Chess Championship =

Annual chess championship of Costa Rica

The Costa Rican Chess Championship is the yearly national chess championship of Costa Rica. The first edition was played in 1927.

== List of champions ==
Nr	Year	Winner
1	1927	Rómulo Salas
2	1930	Juan José Loria
3	1937	Carlos M. Valverde
4	1938	Rosalía Escalante de Serrano
5	1939	Joaquín Gutiérrez
6	1940	Carlos M. Valverde
7	1941	Carlos M. Valverde
8	1942	Carlos M. Valverde
9	1943	Joaquín Gutiérrez
10	1944	Joaquín Gutiérrez
11	1945	Carlos M. Valverde
12	1946	Antonio Rojas
13	1947	Rogelio Sotela
14	1948	Jaime Soley
15	1949	Rogelio Sotela
16	1950	Rogelio Sotela
17	1951	Rogelio Sotela
18	1952	R. Charpentier
19	1953	R. Charpentier
20	1954	R. Charpentier
21	1955	R. Charpentier
22	1956	R. Charpentier
23	1957	R. Charpentier
24	1958	R. Charpentier
25	1959	R. Charpentier
26	1960	Pablo Amiguetti
27	1961	José Ma. Soto
28	1962	Walter Field
29	1963	Pablo Amiguetti
30	1964	Samuel Li Chen
31	1965	Fernando Montero
32	1966	Fernando Montero
33	1968	Alfonso Morales
34	1969	Jorge Van der Laat
35	1970	Fernando Aguilar
36	1971	Fernando Aguilar
37	1972	Juan Leon Jimenez Molina
38	1973	Jaime Vaglio Muñoz
39	1974	Fernando Montero
40	1975	Juan Leon Jimenez Molina
41	1976	Jaime Vaglio Muñoz
42	1977	Juan Leon Jimenez Molina
43	1978	Juan Leon Jimenez Molina
44	1979	William Charpentier
45	1980	William Charpentier
46	1981	William Charpentier
47	1982	Eduardo Piza
48	1983	Alexis Vargas
49	1984	Francis Mayland
50	1985	William Charpentier
51	1986	Jaime Vaglio Muñoz
52	1987	William Charpentier
53	1989	William Charpentier
54	1990	Bernal González Acosta
55	1991	Bernal González Acosta
56	1992	Sergio Minero Pineda
57	1993	Bernal González Acosta
58	1994	Alexis Murillo Tsijli
59	1995	Bernal González Acosta
60	1996	Bernal González Acosta
61	1997	Alexis Murillo Tsijli
62	1998	Leonardo Valdés
63	1999	Sergio Minero Pineda
64	2000	Bernal González Acosta
65	2001	Bernal González Acosta
66	2002	Leonardo Valdés
67	2003	Manuel Bernal González
68	2004	Sergio Minero Pineda
69	2005	Bernal González Acosta
70	2006	Bernal González Acosta
71	2007	Leonardo Valdés
72	2008	Bernal González Acosta
73	2009	Mauricio Arias Santana
74	2010	Bernal González Acosta
75	2011	Bernal González Acosta
76	2012	Leonardo Valdés
77	2013	Bernal González Acosta
78	2014	Alexis Murillo Tsijli
79	2015	Sergio Minero Pineda
80	2016	Bernal González Acosta
81	2017	Sergio Durán
82	2018	Mauricio Arias Santana
83	2019	Sergio Durán
84	2020	Sergio Minero Pineda
85	2021	Emmanuel Jimenez Garcia
86	2022	Leonardo Valdés
87	2023	Emmanuel Jimenez Garcia
88	2024	Emmanuel Jimenez Garcia

== List of women's champions ==
Nr	Year	Winner
1	1938	Rosalía Escalante de Serrano
2	1977	Emma Hernández
3	1990	Laura Granados on tiebreak match (2.5–1.5) over Silvia Arroyo
4	1991	Laura Granados
5	1992	Natalia Chaves
6	1993	Karla Ramírez on tiebreak match (2–0) over Adela Navarro
7	1994	Meylin Villegas Loaiza
	1995	cancelled
8	1996	Karla Ramírez
9	1997	Meylin Villegas Loaiza
10	1998	Meylin Villegas Loaiza
11	1999	Meylin Villegas Loaiza
	2001	Carolina Muñoz
	2002	Sofia Lowski
