= Susan Caldwell =

English chess player (born 1958)

Personal information
- Born: 2 October 1958 (age 67)

Chess career
- Country: England

Susan Linda Caldwell (born 2 October 1958) is an English chess player. She is a three-time medal winner of the British Women's Chess Championship (1974, 1977, 1978) and Women's Chess Olympiad team silver medal winner (1976).

== Biography ==
Susan Caldwell participated in many British Women's Chess Championships:

- in 1973 shared 5th–6th place;
- in 1974 shared 2nd–3rd place;
- in 1975 shared 4th–5th place;
- in 1976 shared 5th–6th place;
- in 1977 ranked 3rd place;
- in 1978 shared 1st–2nd place but lost Sheila Jackson additional match with 0:2.

In 1975, in Glasgow Susan Caldwell with England team won Glasgow 800 Team Chess Tournament with perfect individual result (3 points from 3). In 1978, in Kikinda she ranked 7th in 2nd European Girls' Junior Chess Championship (tournament won Nana Ioseliani). In 1981, in Benidorm Susan Caldwell shared 4th-5th place with Sheila Jackson in Women's World Chess Championship West European zonal tournament (tournament won Nieves García Vicente).

Susan Caldwell played for England in the Women's Chess Olympiads:

- In 1976, at first reserve board in the 7th Chess Olympiad (women) in Haifa (+3, =2, -3) and won the team silver medal,
- In 1978, at third board in the 8th Chess Olympiad (women) in Buenos Aires (+6, =1, -5),
- In 1980, at third board in the 9th Chess Olympiad (women) in Valletta (+5, =2, -4).

Susan Caldwell was a director of the Hallas Foundation Ltd. and Larkham Printers and Publishers Ltd. She is an author of chess books "The Usborne Guide to Playing Chess" (ISBN 0746001355) and "Playing Chess (A Beginner's Guide)" (ISBN 0860204073).
