= Sabine Warkentin =

French chess player

Personal information
- Born: 25 July 1941 (age 84) Paris, France

Chess career
- Country: France

Sabine Warkentin (born 25 July 1941) is a French chess player, French Women's Chess Championship medalist (1980).

== Biography ==
From the mid-1970s to the early 1980s, Sabine Warkentin was one of France's leading women's chess players. She has participated many times in French women's chess championships and won bronze medal in 1980.

Sabine Warkentin played for France in the Women's Chess Olympiads:

- In 1976, at first reserve board in the 7th Chess Olympiad (women) in Haifa (+1, =1, -3),
- In 1978, at first reserve board in the 8th Chess Olympiad (women) in Buenos Aires (+2, =2, -4).
