= Margita Tomanová =

Slovak chess player

Personal information
- Born: 13 November 1953 (age 72) Kežmarok, Czechoslovakia

Chess career
- Country: Czechoslovakia; Slovakia

Margita Tomanová (née Polanová; born 13 November 1953) is a Slovak chess player, Czechoslovak Women's Chess Championship winner (1974).

== Biography ==
In the 1970s, Margita Tomanová was one of the leading Czechoslovak women's chess players. In 1974 she won Czechoslovak Women's Chess Championship. In 1975, in Karlovy Vary Margita Tomanová participated in Women's World Chess Championship European Zonal tournament where shared 12th-13th places with Anna Jurczyńska.

Margita Tomanová played for Czechoslovakia in the Women's Chess Olympiad:

- * In 1974, at first reserve board in the 6th Chess Olympiad (women) in Medellín (+3, =0, -2).
