= Maria Idalia Zapata =

Colombian chess player (born 1946)

Personal information
- Born: 1946 (age 79–80)

Chess career
- Country: Colombia
- Peak rating: 1711 (March 2024)

Maria Idalia Zapata (born 1946) is a Colombian chess player.

== Biography ==
In the 1970s, Maria Idalia Zapata was one of Colombia's leading female chess players. In 1975, in Caracas she participated in Women's World Chess Championships Central American Zonal tournament and ranked in 5th place.

Maria Idalia Zapata played for Colombia and Colombia-2 teams in the Women's Chess Olympiads:

- In 1974, at second board in the 6th Chess Olympiad (women) in Medellín (+2, =0, -1),
- In 1976, at third board in the 7th Chess Olympiad (women) in Haifa (+3, =3, -3),
- In 1978, at first reserve board in the 8th Chess Olympiad (women) in Buenos Aires (+1, =1, -3).
