= Leighton Williams =

Welsh chess player

Personal information
- Born: 23 February 1977 (age 49) Wales

Chess career
- Country: Wales
- Title: International Master (2002)
- FIDE rating: 2402 (July 2026)
- Peak rating: 2402 (July 2010)

Leighton Williams (born 23 February 1977), is a Welsh chess International Master (IM) (2002), three-times Welsh Chess Championship winner (2000, 2005, 2008), Chess Olympiad individual gold medalist (1994). He is the 3rd best Welsh player.

== Biography ==
Leighton Williams three times won Welsh Chess Championships: 2000, 2005, and 2008. He three times played for Welsh Chess Club Nidum Liberals in European Men's Chess Club Cup (1996-1998).

Leighton Williams played for Wales in the Chess Olympiads:

- In 1994, at first reserve board in the 31st Chess Olympiad in Moscow (+6, =0, -1) and won individual gold medal,
- In 1996, at second reserve board in the 32nd Chess Olympiad in Yerevan (+3, =2, -3),
- In 2000, at first board in the 34th Chess Olympiad in Istanbul (+2, =3, -6),
- In 2002, at first board in the 35th Chess Olympiad in Bled (+7, =4, -2),
- In 2004, at first board in the 36th Chess Olympiad in Calvià (+2, =2, -6),
- In 2006, at first board in the 37th Chess Olympiad in Turin (+6, =1, -2).

In 2002, he was awarded the FIDE International Master (IM) title.
