= Guillermo Scholz Solis =

Chilean chess player (born 1947)

Personal information
- Born: 5 March 1947 (age 79)

Chess career
- Country: Chile (until 1986); France (since 1986)
- Title: FIDE Master (1984)
- Peak rating: 2385 (July 1989)

Guillermo Scholz Solis (born 5 March 1947) is a Chilean chess FIDE Master (FM).

== Biography ==
From the mid-1970s to the mid-1980s, Scholz was one of Chile's leading chess players. He was a multiple participant in the Chilean Chess Championship. His best result was 4th place in 1976. Guillermo Scholz Solis participated in international chess tournaments that took place in South America.

Scholz played for Chile in the Chess Olympiads:

- In 1976, at the fourth board in the 22nd Chess Olympiad in Haifa (+3, =4, -2),
- In 1978, at the first reserve board in the 23rd Chess Olympiad in Buenos Aires (+1, =2, -2),
- In 1984, at the first reserve board in the 26th Chess Olympiad in Thessaloniki (+0, =3, -2).

In the 1990s, Scholz moved to France, where he participated in various chess tournaments until 2007.
