= Paul Lamford =

Welsh gaming and gambling expert, author, publisher, and company director

Paul Adrian Lamford is a Welsh gaming and gambling expert, author, publisher and company director. He is a three-time Welsh chess champion, 1993 and 2001 British backgammon champion, and a Grandmaster at bridge and a poker player. During the 1990s he was editor of Games & Puzzles magazine and has been editor of Chess magazine and Bridge magazine. He appeared several times on Radio 4's Puzzle Panel.

== Chess ==
Lamford shared the Welsh Chess Championship in 1983 and 1988, and won it outright in 1989. He represented Wales at four chess olympiads (1982, 1984, 1986 and 1988), scoring 50% overall. His peak FIDE rating was 2315 in the January 1979 list. He was awarded the title of International Arbiter in 1986. At correspondence chess, he was awarded the ICCF International Master title in 1990. Lamford is also known for his chess compositions.

== Bibliography ==
- The Albin counter-gambit : 1 d4 d5 2 c4 e5!?. Batsford. 1983. ISBN 9780713440058.
- The amazing book of casino games : techniques, strategies, and hints on how to play any game you find in a casino. Chartwell Books. 1998. ISBN 9780785808206.
- 100 backgammon puzzles. Chameleon. 1999. ISBN 9780713440058.
- 100 chess puzzles. Chameleon. 1999. ISBN 9780233997131.
- 50 bridge puzzles. Chameleon. 2000. ISBN 9780233997261.
- 100 Scrabble puzzles. Chameleon. 2000. ISBN 9780233997155.
- Starting out in backgammon. Everyman Mindsports. 2001. ISBN 9781857442823.
- Starting out in bridge. Everyman Mindsports. 2001. ISBN 9781857442878.
- Improve your backgammon. Everyman Mindsports. 2002. ISBN 9781857443158.
- Gambling. Harper Collins. 2000. ISBN 9780004724713.
- The Lottery. Harper Collins. 2000. ISBN 9780004724638.
