= Norma Snitkowsky =

Brazilian chess player

Chess career
- Country: Brazil

Norma Snitkowsky is a Brazilian chess player, four time Brazilian Women's Chess Championships medalist (1969, 1973, 1975, 1979).

== Biography ==
From the end of 1960s to the end of 1970s Norma Snitkowsky was one of the leading Brazilian chess female players. She has participated in many Brazilian Women's Chess Championships and won four silver medals: 1969, 1973, 1975, and 1979. In 1975, in Fortaleza Norma Snitkowsky participated in the Women's World Chess Championship South American Zonal Tournament and ranked in 3rd place.

Norma Snitkowsky played for Brazil in the Women's Chess Olympiads:

- In 1974, at first reserve board in the 6th Chess Olympiad (women) in Medellín (+2, =3, -3),
- In 1978, at first reserve board in the 8th Chess Olympiad (women) in Buenos Aires (+5, =4, -3),
- In 1984, at first reserve board in the 26th Chess Olympiad (women) in Thessaloniki (+1, =0, -3).
