= John Grantley Cooper =

Welsh chess player

Personal information
- Born: 14 May 1954 (age 72) Cardiff, Wales

Chess career
- Country: Wales
- Title: International Master (1984)
- Peak rating: 2395 (January 1985)

John Grantley Cooper (born 14 May 1954) is a Welsh chess International Master (IM) (1984), ten-times Welsh Chess Championship winner (1976, 1977, 1978, 1984, 1985, 1992, 1993, 1994, 1995, 1996), two-times Chess Olympiad individual silver medal winner (1976, 1984).

== Biography ==
John Grantley Cooper has won ten times in the Welsh Chess Championships: 1976 (jointly), 1977 (jointly), 1978 (jointly), 1984, 1985, 1992, 1993 (jointly), 1994 (jointly), 1995, and 1996. In 1984, he was awarded the FIDE International Master (IM) title.

John Grantley Cooper played for Wales in the Chess Olympiads:

- In 1974, at fourth board in the 21st Chess Olympiad in Nice (+7, =4, -7),
- In 1976, at fourth board in the 22nd Chess Olympiad in Haifa (+5, =3, -2) and won individual silver medal,
- In 1978, at first board in the 23rd Chess Olympiad in Buenos Aires (+6, =2, -5),
- In 1980, at third board in the 24th Chess Olympiad in La Valletta (+5, =4, -4),
- In 1982, at second board in the 25th Chess Olympiad in Lucerne (+6, =2, -3),
- In 1984, at second board in the 26th Chess Olympiad in Thessaloniki (+7, =4, -0) and won individual silver medal,
- In 1986, at first board in the 27th Chess Olympiad in Dubai (+3, =5, -4),
- In 1988, at first board in the 28th Chess Olympiad in Thessaloniki (+5, =3, -5),
- In 1990, at first board in the 29th Chess Olympiad in Novi Sad (+4, =4, -3),
- In 1992, at first board in the 30th Chess Olympiad in Manila (+5, =4, -3).
