= Dominican Chess Championship =

The Dominican Chess Championship is currently organized by the Dominican Chess Federation (Spanish: Federación Dominicana de Ajedrez), whose current incarnation dates back to 1965. The first national championship was held in 1926 and the first women's championship was held in 1977.

== Open championship winners ==
Year	Champion
1926	Gilberto Gómez
1928	Antinoe Fiallo
1934	José Arjonilla
1940	José Arjonilla
1940	José de Jesús Jiménez
1944	Juan Bonetti
1953	Alberto Malagón
1955	Frank Sánchez
1958	Frank Sánchez
1963	Gustavo Peña
1966	Freddy Yabra
1968	Alberto Malagón
1969	César Malagón
1970	Luís Belliard
1971	Luís Belliard
1972	Eliseo González
1973	Alberto Delgado
1974	César Juliao
1975	David Abréu
1976	Alberto Delgado
1977	Alberto Delgado
1978	David Abréu
1979	Ramón Mateo
1980	Franklin Alvarez
1981	Eliseo González
1982	David Abréu
1983	Yuan Eu Liao
1984	Yuan Eu Liao
1985	Eliseo González
1986	Ramón Mateo
1987	Gustavo Hernández
1988	Gustavo Hernández
1990	José Manuel Domínguez
1991	José Manuel Domínguez
1992	José Manuel Domínguez
1993	Marino Fernández
1994	Juan Manuel Jaquez
1995	Marino Fernández
1996	Fernando Cabrera
1997	William Puntier
1998	Gustavo Hernández
1999	José Manuel Domínguez
2000	Ramón Mateo
2001	William Puntier
2002	Ramón Mateo
2003	Ramón Mateo
2004	Ramón Mateo
2005	Nelson Alvarado
2006	Lisandro Muñoz
2007	José Manuel Domínguez
2008	José Manuel Domínguez
2009	Lisandro Muñoz
2010	Ramón Mateo
2011	Miguel Infante
2012	Lisandro Muñoz
2013	William Puntier
2014	Lisandro Muñoz
2015	José Manuel Domínguez
2016	Lisandro Muñoz
2017	Lisandro Muñoz
2018	Carlos Paúl Abreu
2019	Francis Fernández Paulino

== Women's championship winners ==
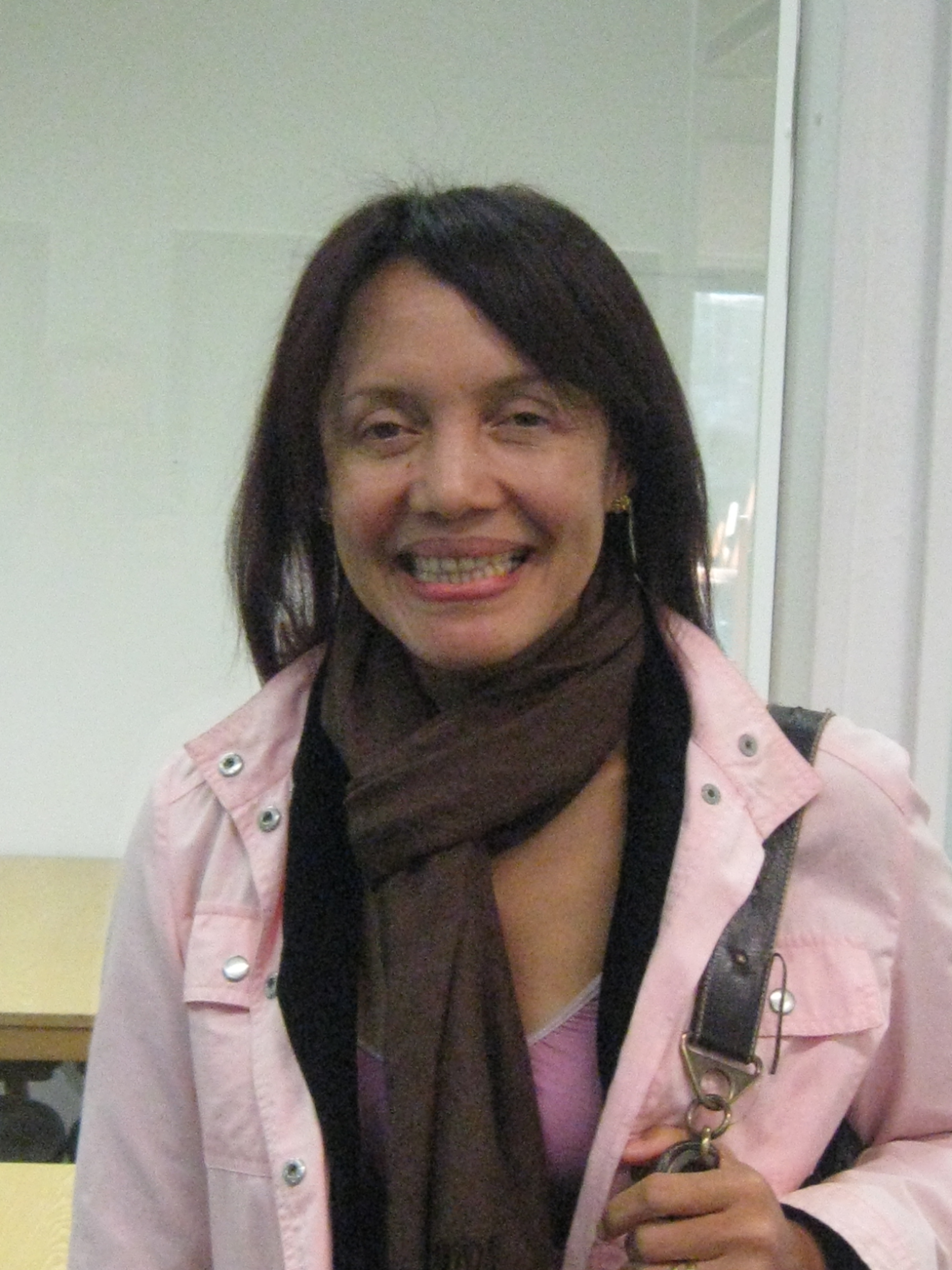
Eneida Pérez, seven-time Dominican women's champion from 1985 to 2011

Year	Champion
1977	Marvin González
1978	Alba Rosa Mariano
1979	Ana Esther García
1980	Ana Esther García
1981	Ana Esther García
1982	Polonia Guzmán
1983	Sayonara Báez
1984	Sayonara Báez
1985	Eneida Pérez
1986	Eneida Pérez
1987	Eneida Pérez
1988	Eneida Pérez
1990	Ana Esther García
1991	Polonia Guzmán
1992	Susan Pérez
1993	Ana Esther García
1994	Ana Esther García
1995	Ana Esther García
1996	Rosmery Espinal
1997	Ana Esther García
1998	Ana Esther García
1999	Mercedes de la Crúz
2000	Ana Esther García
2001	Ana Esther García
2002	Eneida Pérez
2003	Eneida Pérez
2004	Kenia José Polanco
2005	Mercedes de la Crúz
2006	Mercedes de la Crúz
2007	Mercedes de la Crúz
2008	Kenia José Polanco
2009	Omaira Aybar
2010	Ariella Adames
2011	Eneida Pérez
2012	Doribel Muñoz
2013	Wilsaida Díaz
2014	Elizabeth Hazim
2015	Wilsaida Díaz
2016	Wilsaida Díaz
2017	Jennifer María Almánzar Vásquez
2018	Patricia Castillo Peña
2019	Patricia Castillo Peña
2021	Patricia Castillo Peña
2022	Raydily Rosario Almánzar
