= Mary Elizabeth Davies =

Welsh chess player

Personal information
- Born: 11 October 1925
- Died: 3 June 2015 (aged 89)

Chess career
- Country: United Kingdom
- Title: Chess player

Mary Elizabeth Davies (11 October 1925 – 3 June 2015) was a Welsh chess player, Welsh Women's Chess Championship winner (1974).

== Biography ==
In the 1970s Mary Elizabeth Davies was one of the best chess female player in Wales. She has won Welsh Women's Chess Championship in 1974.

Mary Elizabeth Davies played for Wales in the Chess Olympiad: In 1976, at third board in the 7th Chess Olympiad (women) in Haifa (+3, =0, -5).
