= Ada van der Giessen =

Dutch chess player

Personal information
- Born: 4 May 1948 (age 78)

Chess career
- Country: Netherlands
- Peak rating: 2095 (January 1976)

Ada van der Giessen (born 4 May 1948) is a Dutch chess player. She is a winner of the Dutch Women's Chess Championship (1973) and Women's Chess Olympiads twice individual silver medalist (1972, 1976).

== Biography ==
In the 1970s Ada van der Giessen was one of the leading Dutch women chess players. In 1973 she won the Dutch Women's Chess Championship.

Ada van der Giessen played for the Netherlands in the Women's Chess Olympiads:

- In 1972, at first reserve board in the 5th Chess Olympiad (women) in Skopje (+4, =1, -3) and won an individual silver medal,
- In 1974, at second board in the 6th Chess Olympiad (women) in Medellín (+5, =2, -3),
- In 1976, at first reserve board in the 7th Chess Olympiad (women) in Haifa (+5, =3, -1) and won an individual silver medal.

In 2003 and 2011, she became the winner of the Alphense Schaakclub senior tournament in Alphen aan den Rijn.
