= Richard Jones (chess player) =

Welsh chess player

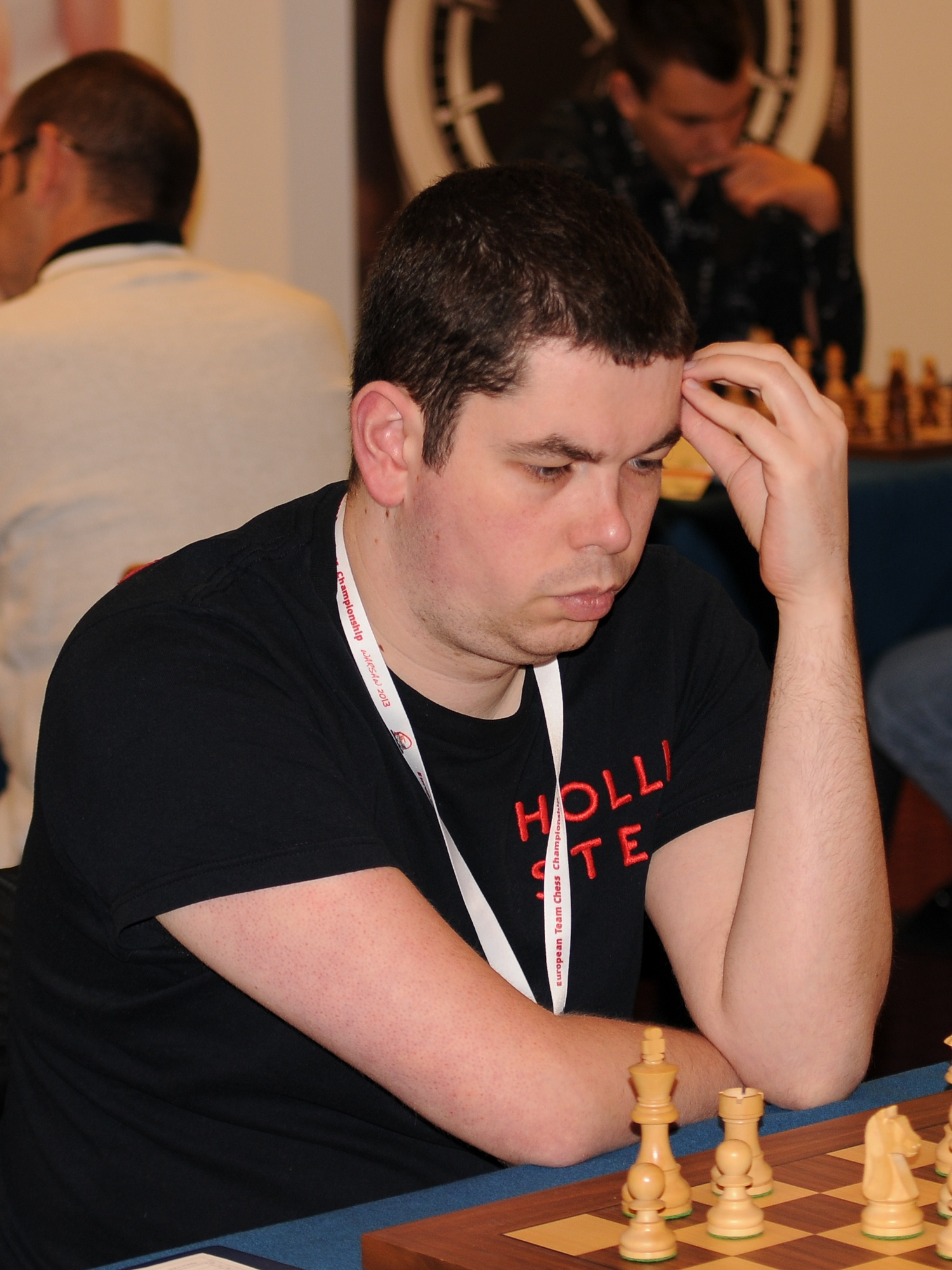
- Jones in 2013

Personal information
- Born: March 28, 1983 (age 43) Swansea, Wales

Chess career
- Country: Wales
- Title: International Master (2012)
- FIDE rating: 2394 (August 2017)
- Peak rating: 2440 (June 2013)

Richard Stuart Jones (born 28 March 1983) is a Welsh International Master from Swansea, Wales. Jones first became Welsh Chess Champion in 2002 and held the title again in 2003, 2009 (shared with Ioan Rees), 2010, 2012 (shared with Tim Kett) and 2013. Jones has played in chess Olympiads for Wales in 2000, 2002, 2004, 2006, 2008, 2010, 2012, 2014 and 2016.
