= Jose Camacho-Collados =

Spanish chess player and professor (born 1988)

Personal information
- Born: November 21, 1988 (age 37) Granada, Spain

Chess career
- Country: Spain (until 2011); South Korea (2011–2022); Wales (since 2022)
- Title: International Master (2013)
- Peak rating: 2419 (December 2019)

Jose Camacho-Collados is a Spanish chess player and professor at Cardiff University in the School of Computer Science and Informatics, an International Master of chess and the reigning Welsh Chess Champion., winning in 2022, 2025, and 2026.

== Education and research ==
In 2017 Collados would publish his doctoral thesis, which he subsequently defended early into 2018 and received a Ph.D in Computer Science from Sapienza, University of Rome.

In 2018, Collados would form part of a team of researchers from Cardiff University and the Charles III University of Madrid that provided software known as Veripol to Spanish police. The software used LLM techniques to analyse text to determine the likelihood of a burglary police report being true or false. Though it had its flaws, it was rolled out for nationwide use in 2018 after a successful pilot in 2017. Following changes in EU law, in particular with regard to "high-risk AI" and a lack of transparency, the program ceased use in 2025.

In 2023, Collados became a Professor at Cardiff University.

== Chess career ==
In 2007, Collados was awarded the FIDE Master title, and subsequently achieved the International Master title in 2013. His title norms were achieved through two Swiss events in 2006 and 2008, and one Round Robin event in 2013.

He has represented several federations over his career, including Spain, South Korea and Wales.

Collados has won the Welsh Chess Championship twice, in 2022 with 5.5/7, and in 2025 with 6.5/7.
