= Regulus Grammar Compiler =

- Stable release: 2.6.0 / January 17, 2007; 18 years ago
- Operating system: Cross-platform
- License: LGPL
- Website: www.issco.unige.ch/projects/regulus/

The Regulus Grammar Compiler is a software system for compiling unification grammars into grammars for speech recognition systems.
