= Poutiainen =

Poutiainen is a Finnish surname. Notable people with the surname include:

- Matti Poutiainen (1864–1929), Finnish politician
- Ari Poutiainen (born 1972), Finnish musician
- Tanja Poutiainen (born 1980), Finnish skier
- Patrick Poutiainen (born 1991), Finnish footballer
- Pertti Poutiainen (1952–1978), Finnish chess master
