= 7th Chess Olympiad =

1937 chess tournament in Stockholm, Sweden

The 7th Chess Olympiad (Swedish: Den 7:e Schackolympiad), organized by the FIDE and comprising a team tournament, took place between July 31 and August 14, 1937, in Stockholm, Sweden.

The 1937 Women's World Chess Championship also took place during the Olympiad.

== Results ==
=== Final ===
#	Country	Players	Points
1	United States	Reshevsky, Fine, Kashdan, Marshall, Horowitz	54½
2	Hungary	Lilienthal, Szabó, Steiner E., Havasi, Vajda	48½
3	Poland	Tartakower, Najdorf, Frydman, Appel, Regedziński	47
4	Argentina	Piazzini, Bolbochán Jac., Grau, Guimard, Pleci	47
5	Czechoslovakia	Flohr, Foltys, Zinner, Pelikán, Zíta	45
6	Netherlands	Euwe, Landau, Prins, van Scheltinga, De Groot	44
7	Estonia	Keres, Schmidt, Raud, Türn, Friedemann	41½
8	Lithuania	Mikėnas, Vaitonis, Vistaneckis, Luckis, Abramavičius	41½
9	Yugoslavia	Pirc, Trifunović, Vuković S., Kostić, Bröder	40
10	Sweden	Ståhlberg, Lundin, Stoltz, Danielsson, Jonsson	38½
11	Latvia	Petrovs, Apšenieks, Mežgailis, Ozols, Endzelīns	37½
12	Finland	Gauffin, Böök, Solin, Salo, Ojanen	34
13	England	Thomas, Alexander, Milner-Barry, Golombek, Wheatcroft	34
14	Italy	Castaldi, Riello, Napolitano, Staldi, Rosselli del Turco	26½
15	Denmark	Enevoldsen, Sørensen, Poulsen, Larsen, Petersen	25½
16	Iceland	Gilfer, Guðmundsson, Ásgeirsson, Möller, Pétursson	23
17	Belgium	Dunkelblum, O'Kelly, Baert, Defosse	22½
18	Norway	Herseth, Kavli-Jørgensen, Guldbrandsen, Salbu, Christoffersen	19½
19	Scotland	Aitken, Montgomerie, Page, Reid, Pirie	14

=== Team results ===
Place	Country	1	2	3	4	5	6	7	8	9	10	11	12	13	14	15	16	17	18	19	+	−	=	Points
1	United States	-	2	3½	2½	3	2	2½	3½	3	2½	2	3½	3½	3	4	4	3½	3	3½	15	0	3	54½
2	Hungary	2	-	2	2	2	2½	3	2	3	2	3	3	3	2	2½	3	3½	4	4	11	0	7	48½
3	Poland	½	2	-	2½	2	2½	2½	2½	2½	3½	1½	2½	2½	3	3½	4	2½	3	4	14	2	2	47
4	Argentina	1½	2	1½	-	2	1	2	3	2½	3	2	3	2½	4	3	4	2½	3½	4	11	3	4	47
5	Czechoslovakia	1	2	2	2	-	2	2½	3½	1½	3	2	3	2½	3	2½	3½	3½	3	2½	11	2	5	45
6	Netherlands	2	1½	1½	3	2	-	2½	3	2½	2	3	2	2½	3	2	2½	3	2½	3½	11	2	5	44
7	Estonia	1½	1	1½	2	1½	1½	-	1½	3	2	2½	½	3	3	3	3½	3	3½	4	9	7	2	41½
8	Lithuania	½	2	1½	1	½	1	2½	-	2½	2	3½	2	2	4	3	1½	4	4	4	8	6	4	41½
9	Yugoslavia	1	1	1½	1½	2½	1½	1	1½	-	2	3	2	2½	3	3½	2	3	3½	4	8	7	3	40
10	Sweden	1½	2	½	1	1	2	2	2	2	-	3	2	2½	3	3	2½	3½	3	2	7	4	7	38½
11	Latvia	2	1	2½	2	2	1	1½	½	1	1	-	3	3	2	3	2½	2½	3	4	8	6	4	37½
12	Finland	½	1	1½	1	1	2	3½	2	2	2	1	-	1	3	2½	2½	2	3	2½	6	7	5	34
13	England	½	1	1½	1½	1½	1½	1	2	1½	1½	1	3	-	3	2	3½	3	3	2	5	10	3	34
14	Italy	1	2	1	0	1	1	1	0	1	1	2	1	1	-	1½	3	2	3	4	3	12	3	26½
15	Denmark	0	1½	½	1	1½	2	1	1	½	1	1	1½	2	2½	-	2	2½	1½	2½	3	12	3	25½
16	Iceland	0	1	0	0	½	1½	½	2½	2	1½	1½	1½	½	1	2	-	3½	1½	2	2	13	3	23
17	Belgium	½	½	1½	1½	½	1	1	0	1	½	1½	2	1	2	1½	½	-	2½	3½	2	14	2	22½
18	Norway	1	0	1	½	1	1½	½	0	½	1	1	1	1	1	2½	2½	1½	-	2	2	15	1	19½
19	Scotland	½	0	0	0	1½	½	0	0	0	2	0	1½	2	0	1½	2	½	2	-	0	14	4	14

=== Individual medals ===
The prizes for best individual results went to:

- Board 1: (Czechoslovakia) Salo Flohr 12½ / 16 = 78.1%
- Board 2: (United States) Reuben Fine 11½ / 15 = 76.7%
- Board 3: (United States) Isaac Kashdan 14 / 16 = 87.5%
- Board 4: (Sweden) Gösta Danielsson 14 / 18 = 77.8%
- Reserve: (United States) Al Horowitz 13 / 15 = 86.7%
