= Defossé =

Defossé, Defosse is a French surname. Notable people with the surname include:

- Adolphe-Édouard Défossé (1855–1922), French politician
- Alain Defossé (1957–2017), French novelist and translator
- Robert Défossé (1909–1973), French football player
- Denis Marion born Defosse
