= Gauffin =

Gauffin is a Swedish surname. Notable people with the surname include:

- Emy Gauffin (1928–1993), Swedish orienteering competitor
- Thorsten Gauffin (1901–1970), Finnish chess player
