= Osmo Kaila =

Finnish chess player

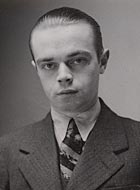
Osmo Kaila

Osmo Ilmari Kaila (11 May 1916 – 3 June 1991) was a Finnish chess master and chess problemist.

Born in Helsinki, he was twice Finnish Champion (1939, 1954) and thrice Sub-Champion (1947, 1951, 1952).

At the 20th Nordic Chess Championship (1939) in Oslo, Kaila was in 3rd place, behind Gideon Ståhlberg and Erik Lundin and won at Copenhagen 1946 (The 21st Nordic Championship). In 1947, he was tied for 7–8th in Helsinki (zonal, Eero Böök and Gösta Stoltz won).

He represented Finland in the following Chess Olympiads:

- In 1936, at seventh board in the 3rd unofficial Chess Olympiad in Munich (+10 –4 =6);
- In 1952, at third board in the 10th Chess Olympiad in Helsinki (+4 –3 =4).

He was awarded the title of International Master (IM) in 1952.
