= Karttunen =

Karttunen is a Finnish surname. Notable people with the surname include:

- Anssi Karttunen (born 1960), Finnish classical cellist
- Frances Karttunen (born 1942), American linguist, historian and writer
- Hanna Karttunen, Finnish dancer
- Lauri Karttunen (1941–2022), American linguist
- Mika Karttunen (born 1981), Finnish chess player
- Ossi Karttunen (born 1948), Finnish sprinter

== See also ==
- 3758 Karttunen, a main-belt asteroid
