= Kaarle Ojanen (chess player) =

Finnish chess player

Kaarle Sakari Ojanen (4 December 1918 – 9 January 2009) was a Finnish chess player. Born in Helsinki in 1918, he became a Finnish National Master in 1938 and was the leading Finnish player between Eero Böök and Heikki Westerinen. He was perhaps best known for defeating world championship candidate, grandmaster Paul Keres, at Helsinki, 1960.

Ojanen earned the FIDE International Master (IM) title in 1952 and the International Master of Correspondence Chess (IMC) title in 1981. He was the thirteen-time Finnish Champion, winning in 1950, 1951, 1951–2, 1952–3, 1957 through 1962, 1967, 1972, and 1983. Ojanen represented Finland in eleven Chess Olympiads: 1937, 1950, 1952, 1956, 1958, 1960, 1962, 1966, 1968, 1970, and 1972, playing first board from 1956 through 1966, thereafter playing second, after Westerinen. Ojanen won the first board individual bronze medal at Havana 1966. In international play, he placed fourth at Oslo 1939, third of ten at Helsinki 1946, and seventeenth at Trenčianske Teplice 1949. In 1991, he performed credibly in World Senior Chess Championship.

Ojanen's unusually long chess career allowed him to meet nearly all of the important master players in Finland, and his insights concerning Modern Benoni and King's Indian positions still hold value in the contemporary game.
