= 2017 Women's European Individual Chess Championship =

Women's European Individual Chess Championship 2017 was a Swiss-system tournament in Riga, to decide the women's European individual chess champion. The title was won by Nana Dzagnidze of Georgia for the first time.

== Tournament ==
At the European Chess Union (ECU) General Assembly during the 42nd Chess Olympiad in Baku in September 2016, the organizational rights to the 18th Individual European Chess Championship for women were awarded to Latvia, who held the event in Riga from 10 to 22 April 2017, under the auspices of European Chess Union. The venue for the championship was the hotel "Radisson Blu Hotel Latvia" (Riga, Elizabetes Street 55) in the center of Riga. The main organizers from Latvia were the President of the Latvian Chess Federation Āris Ozoliņs and tournament director Egons Lavendelis. The chief arbiter of the tournament was Ashot Vardapetyan (Armenia). The tournament was held on Swiss-system in 11 rounds with time control for each player: 90 minutes for 40 moves plus 30 minutes for the rest of the game with an increment of 30 seconds per move, starting from move one. The prize money is 70.000 euro for first, which was distributed among the participants who took the first 20 places (1st place – 12.000 euros, 2nd place – 10.000 euros, 3rd place – 8.000 euros ... 20th place – 1000 euros). 144 chess players from 33 countries took part in the tournament. In connection with the exclusion of the chess federation of Bulgaria from FIDE, all participants from Bulgaria represented the European Chess Union at the tournament. The 18th Individual European Chess Championship for women was qualification event for the next World Women Championship. According to FIDE regulations and the decision of the ECU Board, 14 players qualified for the Women's World Chess Championship 2018 (November). Nana Dzagnidze took clear first place with 8½ from 11 half a point clear of Aleksandra Goryachkina and Alisa Galliamova.

== Tournament table ==
Women's European Individual Chess Championship 2017 (Riga, 11.04.2017–22.04.2017)
Place	Name	Rating	1	2	3	4	5	6	7	8	9	10	11	Points	TB1	TB2	TB3	Rp
1.	Nana Dzagnidze (GEO)	2528	83b1	42w1	34b1	26w½	47b½	28w1	2b½	7w1	5b½	6w1	12b½	8½	0	70	75,5	2646
2.	Aleksandra Goryachkina (RUS)	2452	32b1	88w½	73b1	66w1	65b1	4w½	1w½	19b1	16w½	13b½	8w½	8	0	68	73	2576
3.	Alisa Galliamova (RUS)	2444	59b1	116w1	48b½	65w0	54b1	70w½	66b½	29w1	9b½	47w1	16b1	8	0	61,5	66	2529
4.	Kateryna Lagno (RUS)	2543	38w1	17b½	35w1	22b½	52w1	2b½	11w½	16b0	27w1	37b1	14w½	7½	0	70	76	2506
5.	Mariya Muzychuk (UKR)	2546	76b1	53w1	22b½	92w1	28b½	7w½	10b½	50w1	1w½	16b½	15w½	7½	0	69	74	2547
6.	Monika Soćko (POL)	2462	84w1	65b0	83w1	17b1	22w½	37b1	16w½	23b1	13w½	1b0	41w1	7½	0	68	73,5	2505
7.	Elina Danielian (ARM)	2437	101w½	90b1	30w1	69b½	25w1	5b½	20w1	1b0	49w1	8b½	13w½	7½	0	68	73	2528
8.	Elisabeth Pähtz (GER)	2454	63b1	25w1	66b½	77w½	36b1	47w½	26b½	9w½	19b1	7w½	2b½	7½	0	67,5	73	2531
9.	Marina Nechaeva (RUS)	2395	87w0	118b1	56w1	39b1	20w½	49b½	14w1	8b½	3w½	43b1	11w½	7½	0	67,5	71,5	2479
10.	Bela Khotenashvili (GEO)	2445	56w1	97b½	58w1	29b½	69w1	11b½	5w½	49b½	17w½	41b½	38w1	7½	0	65	70	2487
11.	Natalia Zhukova (UKR)	2438	75b1	54w1	65b½	27w½	77b1	10w½	4b½	26w½	47b½	48w1	9b½	7½	0	64,5	70	2520
12.	Natalia Pogonina (RUS)	2478	68w½	96b1	60w1	47b0	27w½	69b½	58w1	35b½	34w1	17b1	1w½	7½	0	64	69	2476
13.	Hoang Thanh Trang (HUN)	2459	86b½	67w½	81b1	89w1	33b½	92w1	47b½	28w1	6b½	2w½	7b½	7½	0	63	68	2500
14.	Anita Gara (HUN)	2354	137b½	119w1	31b½	67w1	50b½	21w½	9b0	105w1	28b1	26w1	4b½	7½	0	62,5	67	2482
15.	Inna Gaponenko (UKR)	2416	51b½	109w½	32b½	86w1	48b1	66w½	29b½	36w½	65b1	39w1	5b½	7½	0	61,5	66	2453
16.	Alina Kashlinskaya (RUS)	2426	71w0	110b1	84w1	94b½	58w1	68b1	6b½	4w1	2b½	5w½	3w0	7	0	66	70,5	2455
17.	Iulija Osmak (UKR)	2348	132b1	4w½	18b½	6w0	51b1	106w½	31b1	74w1	10b½	12w0	47b1	7	0	65,5	69	2455
18.	Lela Javakhishvili (GEO)	2456	55w1	30b½	17w½	45b1	29w½	33b1	19w0	27b0	73w1	35b½	60w1	7	0	65	70,5	2436
19.	Daria Pustovoitova (RUS)	2411	99w0	100b1	102w1	62b1	26b½	65w1	18b1	2w0	8w0	49b1	43w½	7	0	63	68	2465
20.	Olga Girya (RUS)	2470	67b½	79w1	88b1	33w½	9b½	74w1	7b0	47w½	53b½	70w1	24b½	7	0	62,5	67,5	2450
21.	Pia Cramling (SWE)	2452	96w½	68b½	72w½	38b1	95w1	14b½	27w½	30b½	35w½	57b1	23w½	7	0	62,5	67,5	2419
22.	Sarah Hoolt (GER)	2398	126w1	39b1	5w½	4w½	6b½	26w0	65b½	69b½	97w½	89w1	48b1	7	0	62,5	66,5	2481
23.	Sabrina Vega Gutiérrez (ESP)	2413	85b½	51w0	112b1	96w1	76b1	29w½	42b1	6w0	36b½	53w1	21b½	7	0	62	66,5	2411
24.	Karina Szczepkowska (POL)	2414	117w½	98b0	111w1	55b½	56w1	72b½	30w0	68b1	69w1	27b1	20w½	7	0	58,5	63	2355
25.	Gunay Mammadzada (AZE)	2348	131w1	8b0	109w1	31w1	7b0	87b0	56w0	123b1	102w1	59b1	52w1	7	0	58	61,5	2381
26.	Anna Muzychuk (UKR)	2587	41w1	60b½	44w1	1b½	19w½	22b1	8w½	11b½	37w½	14b0	35w½	6½	0	71	77	2458
27.	Ulviyya Fataliyeva (AZE)	2287	136b1	80w1	28w½	11b½	12b½	50w½	21b½	18w1	4b0	24w0	70b1	6½	0	67	70	2426
28.	Ekaterina Atalik (TUR)	2429	123b1	89w1	27b½	48w1	5w½	1b0	87w1	13b0	14w0	65b½	73w1	6½	0	64,5	68,5	2414
29.	Meri Arabidze (GEO)	2373	111w½	120b1	87w1	10w½	18b½	23b½	15w½	3b0	59w½	67b1	46w½	6½	0	64,5	68,5	2368
30.	Nataliya Buksa (UKR)	2314	140b1	18w½	7b0	79w1	74b0	75w1	24b1	21w½	50b½	31w½	33b½	6½	0	64	66,5	2385
31.	Antoaneta Stefanova (BUL)	2527	72w1	58b½	14w½	25b0	84w1	89b½	17w0	83b1	54w1	30b½	44w½	6½	0	63	68	2381
32.	Khayala Abdulla (AZE)	2241	2w0	133b1	15w½	61b1	40w½	52b½	33w½	57b½	70b0	88w1	66b1	6½	0	62,5	66	2405
33.	Evgenija Ovod (RUS)	2382	115w1	71b½	99w1	20b½	13w½	18w0	32b½	72b1	41w0	97b1	30w½	6½	0	62	66,5	2363
34.	Petra Papp (HUN)	2378	122b1	94w1	1w0	41b½	68w0	38b1	71w½	67b1	12b0	51w½	65w1	6½	0	62	66	2356
35.	Gulnar Mammadova (AZE)	2357	119b½	108w1	4b0	90w½	59b1	105w½	106b1	12w½	21b½	18w½	26b½	6½	0	60	64,5	2354
36.	Szidonia Vajda (HUN)	2355	120w½	104b½	123w1	98b1	8w0	71b½	68w1	15b½	23w½	46b½	40w½	6½	0	60	64	2346
37.	Irina Bulmaga (ROM)	2394	130b½	93w0	82b1	91w1	75b1	6w0	73b1	66w1	26b½	4w0	45b½	6½	0	60	63,5	2375
38.	Valentina Golubenko (CRO)	2271	4b0	121w1	79b½	21w0	108b1	34w0	98b1	106w1	74b1	50w1	10b0	6½	0	59,5	63,5	2335
39.	Karina Ambartsumova (RUS)	2282	144b1	22w0	105b1	9w0	131b1	78w½	57w½	61b1	52w1	15b0	49w½	6½	0	59,5	60	2305
40.	Salome Melia (GEO)	2400	107b½	85w1	45b½	76w½	32b½	73w½	54b½	89w1	48b0	62w1	36b½	6½	0	59	63,5	2350
41.	Laura Unuk (SLO)	2275	26b0	122w1	130b1	34w½	70b0	61b½	123w1	92w1	33b1	10w½	6b0	6½	0	59	62,5	2415
42.	Olga Babiy (UKR)	2359	118w1	1b0	101w1	107b½	71w½	90b1	23w0	87b1	43w0	55b½	72w1	6½	0	58,5	62,5	2332
43.	Anastasia Bodnaruk (RUS)	2446	91b½	86w½	67b0	130w1	106b½	94w1	48b½	88w1	42b1	9w0	19b½	6½	0	57	60,5	2338
44.	Olga Badelka (BLR)	2362	108b½	82w1	26b0	75w0	112b1	67w½	51b0	93w1	86b1	81w1	31b½	6½	0	55,5	60	2313
45.	Sopio Gvetadze (GEO)	2292	135w1	52b½	40w½	18w0	105b0	115b1	101w½	90b½	87w1	78b1	37w½	6½	0	55,5	59	2290
46.	Lilit Mkrtchian (ARM)	2425	109b½	91w½	86b0	115w1	67b½	62w1	88b½	54w½	94b1	36w½	29b½	6½	0	55	59,5	2340
47.	Olga Zimina (ITA)	2395	105b1	73w½	51b1	12w1	1w½	8b½	13w½	20b½	11w½	3b0	17w0	6	0	72	76,5	2425
48.	Marina Brunello (ITA)	2354	129w1	49b1	3w½	28b0	15w0	64b1	43w½	71b1	40w1	11b0	22w0	6	0	67	71	2393
49.	Nino Batsiashvili (GEO)	2496	81b1	48w0	93b1	54w½	88b1	9w½	70b1	10w½	7b0	19w0	39b½	6	0	64	69	2380
50.	Jolanta Zawadzka (POL)	2449	102w1	69b½	95w1	52b½	14w½	27b½	55w1	5b0	30w½	38b0	54w½	6	0	63	68	2363
51.	Khayala Isgandarova (TUR)	2211	15w½	23b1	47w0	60b½	17w0	133b1	44w1	52b0	114w1	34b½	57w½	6	0	63	66,5	2366
52.	Daria Charochkina (RUS)	2381	112b1	45w½	106b1	50w½	4b0	32w½	105b½	51w1	39b0	76w1	25b0	6	0	60,5	65	2295
53.	Betül Cemre Yıldız (TUR)	2367	100w1	5b0	64w½	71b0	113w1	107b1	72w½	56b1	20w½	23b0	55w½	6	0	60	64,5	2304
54.	Elizaveta Malakhova (UKR)	2324	133w1	11b0	126w1	49b½	3w0	118b1	40w½	46b½	31b0	91w1	50b½	6	0	60	63,5	2351
55.	Olga Ivanenko (UKR)	2252	18b0	138w1	78b½	24w½	80b1	77w1	50b0	70w½	66b½	42w½	53b½	6	0	60	63	2392
56.	Anna Kantane (POL)	2230	10b0	140w1	9b0	124w1	24b0	111w1	25b1	53w0	88b½	95w1	80b½	6	0	59	61,5	2298
57.	Nastassia Ziaziulkina (BLR)	2387	82b½	130w½	75b½	59w½	86b½	76w1	39b½	32w½	91b1	21w0	51b½	6	0	58,5	62	2276
58.	Ticia Gara (HUN)	2325	138b1	31w½	10b0	93w1	16b0	91w1	12b0	75w0	130b1	94w½	86b1	6	0	57,5	60,5	2312
59.	Katarzyna Toma (POL)	2229	3w0	139b½	120w1	57b½	35w0	100b½	118w1	95b1	29b½	25w0	89b1	6	0	57	60	2260
60.	Sophie Milliet (FRA)	2352	124b1	26w½	12b0	51w½	90b0	98w½	93b½	122w1	105b1	63w1	18b0	6	0	56,5	60,5	2282
61.	Jovanka Houska (ENG)	2397	93b½	107w½	91b½	32w0	85b1	41w½	86b1	39w0	63b0	105w1	99b1	6	0	55,5	60	2254
62.	Anastasia Travkina (RUS)	2287	143w1	66b0	113w1	19w0	110b½	46b0	104w½	111b1	82w1	40b0	90w1	6	0	54,5	56,5	2185
63.	Mai Narva (EST)	2249	8w0	103b0	133w0	135b1	100w0	142b1	125w1	113b1	61w1	60b0	97w1	6	0	50	52,5	2104
64.	Alina Balaian (RUS)	2229	80b0	127w1	53b½	74w0	132b1	48w0	130b0	103w1	108b½	122w1	94b1	6	0	49	52,5	2182
65.	Zeinab Mamedyarova (AZE)	2322	142b1	6w1	11w½	3b1	2w0	19b0	22w½	78b1	15w0	28w½	34b0	5½	0	71	73,5	2367
66.	Ketevan Arakhamia-Grant (SCO)	2374	121b1	62w1	8w½	2b0	107w1	15b½	3w½	37b0	55w½	72b½	32w0	5½	0	66	70	2314
67.	Monica Calzetta Ruiz (ESP)	2257	20w½	13b½	43w1	14b0	46w½	44b½	103b1	34w0	77b1	29w0	74b½	5½	0	65,5	70,5	2357
68.	Mihaela Sandu (ROM)	2261	12b½	21w½	80b1	70w½	34b1	16w0	36b0	24w0	121b1	74w½	77b½	5½	0	63,5	67,5	2379
69.	Ilze Bērziņa (LAT)	2297	127b1	50w½	74b1	7w½	10b0	12w½	92b½	22w½	24b0	99w½	79b½	5½	0	63,5	67,5	2299
70.	Baira Kovanova (RUS)	2376	110w1	87b½	98w½	68b½	41w1	3b½	49w0	55b½	32w1	20b0	27w0	5½	0	62	66,5	2281
71.	Alexandra Zherebtsova (RUS)	2222	16b1	33w½	77b0	53w1	42b½	36w½	34b½	48w0	89b0	108w1	76b½	5½	0	61	65,5	2331
72.	Salomėja Zaksaitė (LTU)	2262	31b0	124w1	21b½	78w½	103b1	24w½	53b½	33w0	80b1	66w½	42b0	5½	0	61	65	2329
73.	Nino Khomeriki (GEO)	2308	134w1	47b½	2w0	87b½	98w1	40b½	37w0	96b1	18b0	75w1	28b0	5½	0	61	64,5	2268
74.	Stavroula Tsolakidou (GRE)	2395	98w½	117b1	69w0	64b1	30w1	20b0	97w1	17b0	38w0	68b½	67w½	5½	0	59,5	64,5	2280
75.	Maria Gevorgyan (ARM)	2227	11w0	134b1	57w½	44b1	37w0	30b0	100w1	58b1	78w0	73b0	114w1	5½	0	59,5	63	2277
76.	Judith Fuchs (GER)	2274	5w0	129b1	103w1	40b½	23w0	57b0	110w1	82b½	90w1	52b0	71w½	5½	0	58,5	62,5	2241
77.	Anastasia Savina (RUS)	2378	113w1	99b½	71w1	8b½	11w0	55b0	96w½	102b½	67w0	110b1	68w½	5½	0	57	61,5	2250
78.	Almira Skripchenko (FRA)	2420	90w½	101b½	55w½	72b½	102w1	39b½	89w½	65w0	75b1	45w0	81b½	5½	0	56	61	2263
79.	Ioulia Makka (GRE)	2069	114w1	20b0	38w½	30b0	97w0	85w1	91b0	109b1	83w½	101b1	69w½	5½	0	56	60,5	2287
80.	Deimantė Daulytė (LTU)	2443	64w1	27b0	68w0	104b1	55w0	99b½	107w1	81b½	72w0	93b1	56w½	5½	0	56	60,5	2220
81.	Kübra Öztürk (TUR)	2261	49w0	125b1	13w0	100b1	87w0	113b1	90w½	80w½	92b1	44b0	78w½	5½	0	55,5	59,5	2278
82.	Margareth Olde (EST)	2110	57w½	44b0	37w0	120b½	138w1	84b1	95w½	76w½	62b0	96b1	83w½	5½	0	55,5	58,5	2248
83.	Turkan Mamedyarova (AZE)	2267	1w0	131b1	6b0	110w0	119b1	130w½	121b1	31w0	79b½	104w1	82b½	5½	0	55	58,5	2194
84.	Anna-Maja Kazarian (NED)	2257	6b0	132w1	16b0	121w1	31b0	82w0	137b0	138b1	111w½	119w1	112b1	5½	0	52,5	55,5	2154
85.	Anastasya Paramzina (RUS)	2202	23w½	40b0	139w1	95b0	61w0	79b0	128w1	100b½	120w½	111b1	116b1	5½	0	51,5	54,5	2125
86.	Elena Sedina (ITA)	2253	13w½	43b½	46w1	15b0	57w½	95b½	61w0	104b1	44w0	103b1	58w0	5	0	62,5	67,5	2287
87.	Anastasia Sazonova (RUS)	2143	9b1	70w½	29b0	73w½	81b1	25w1	28b0	42w0	45b0	92w½	95b½	5	0	62	67	2315
88.	Anna Warakomska (POL)	2343	125w1	2b½	20w0	99b1	49w0	110b1	46w½	43b0	56w½	32b0	91w½	5	0	61	65	2261
89.	Elena-Luminița Cosma (ROM)	2316	139w1	28b0	104w1	13b0	109w1	31w½	78b½	40b0	71w1	22b0	59w0	5	0	60,5	63,5	2253
90.	Elena Semenova (RUS)	2212	78b½	7w0	119b1	35b½	60w1	42w0	81b½	45w½	76b0	106w1	62b0	5	0	60	64,5	2243
91.	Ljilja Drljević (SRB)	2237	43w½	46b½	61w½	37b0	126w1	58b0	79w1	114b1	57w0	54b0	88b½	5	0	58,5	62,5	2296
92.	Marta Michna (GER)	2389	104w½	111b1	97w1	5b0	94w1	13b0	69w½	41b0	81w0	87b½	102w½	5	0	57,5	62	2235
93.	Irina Utiatskaja (RUS)	2152	61w½	37b1	49w0	58b0	114w1	97b0	60w½	44b0	100w1	80w0	118b1	5	0	57	61	2285
94.	Evgeniya Doluhanova (UKR)	2287	128w1	34b0	115w1	16w½	92b0	43b0	126w1	101b1	46w0	58b½	64w0	5	0	57	60,5	2201
95.	Gabriela Antova (BUL)	2335	106b½	137w1	50b0	85w1	21b0	86w½	82b½	59w0	98w1	56b0	87w½	5	0	56	60,5	2164
96.	Maria Komiagina (RUS)	2247	21b½	12w0	108b1	23b0	99w½	122w1	77b½	73w0	119b½	82w0	121b1	5	0	56	60	2200
97.	Lilit Galojan (ARM)	2290	141b1	10w½	92b0	106w0	79b1	93w1	74b0	130w1	22b½	33w0	63b0	5	0	56	59	2159
98.	Tea Gueci (ITA)	2132	74b½	24w1	70b½	36w0	73b0	60b½	38w0	124w1	95b0	120b½	129w1	5	0	55,5	59,5	2223
99.	Khanim Balajayeva (AZE)	2196	19b1	77w½	33b0	88w0	96b½	80w½	114w0	118b1	115w1	69b½	61w0	5	0	55	59	2274
100.	Govhar Beydullayeva (AZE)	2054	53b0	19w0	140b1	81w0	63b1	59w½	75b0	85w½	93b0	127b1	123w1	5	0	54,5	57	2115
101.	Lanita Stetsko (BLR)	2226	7b½	78w½	42b0	131w0	137b1	124w1	45b½	94w0	106b½	79w0	122b1	5	0	54	57,5	2140
102.	Narmin Mammadova (AZE)	2240	50b0	142w1	19b0	137w1	78b0	121w½	132b1	77w½	25b0	112w½	92b½	5	0	53	55,5	2178
103.	Sinem Cagla Gundogan (TUR)	1885	116b0	63w1	76b0	117b1	72w0	109b1	67w0	64b0	113w1	86w0	130b1	5	0	52	55,5	2190
104.	Monika Tsõganova (EST)	2111	92b½	36w½	89b0	80w0	125b½	141w1	62b½	86w0	131w1	83b0	120w1	5	0	50	53	2135
105.	Svetlana Petrenko (MDA)	2136	47w0	128b1	39w0	134b1	45w1	35b½	52w½	14b0	60w0	61b0	110w½	4½	0	59	62,5	2123
106.	Naruna Chan (RUS)	1981	95w½	114b1	52w0	97b1	43w½	17b½	35w0	38b0	101w½	90b0	107w½	4½	0	57	61,5	2246
107.	Ekaterini Pavlidou (GRE)	2180	40w½	61b½	116b1	42w½	66b0	53w0	80b0	108w0	125b1	118w½	106b½	4½	0	53,5	57,5	2184
108.	Anastassia Sinitsina (EST)	2052	44w½	35b0	96w0	129b1	38w0	114b0	141w1	107b1	64w½	71b0	109w½	4½	0	53,5	56,5	2119
109.	Daniela Movileanu (ITA)	2213	46w½	15b½	25b0	125w1	89b0	103w0	124b½	79w0	132b1	121w½	108b½	4½	0	53	56,5	2077
110.	Cagil Irmak Arda (TUR)	2089	70b0	16w0	142b1	83b1	62w½	88w0	76b0	125w1	116b½	77w0	105b½	4½	0	53	55,5	2171
111.	Ana Filipa Baptista (POR)	2071	29b½	92w0	24b0	127w½	140b1	56b0	138w1	62w0	84b½	85w0	132b1	4½	0	52	54,5	2058
112.	Renāte Vidruska (LAT)	2093	52w0	143b1	23w0	114b½	44w0	125b0	127w1	131b½	129w1	102b½	84w0	4½	0	50	52	2023
113.	Elisabeth Hapala (AUT)	2091	77b0	144w1	62b0	116w1	53b0	81w0	143b1	63w0	103b0	124w1	117b½	4½	0	49,5	50	1983
114.	Filiz Osmanodja (GER)	2370	79b0	106w0	138b1	112w½	93b0	108w1	99b1	91w0	51b0	130w1	75b0	4½	0	49	52	2046
115.	Sıla Çağlar (TUR)	2093	33b0	136w1	94b0	46b0	142w1	45w0	131b½	132w1	99b0	116w0	134b1	4½	0	47,5	50	2013
116.	Joanna Worek (CZE)	2330	103w1	3b0	107w0	113b0	118w0	138b0	139w1	128b1	110w½	115b1	85w0	4½	0	47	50	1952
117.	Veronika Exler (AUT)	2208	24b½	74w0	137b½	103w0	124b0	132w0	0	136b1	128w1	131b1	113w½	4½	0	45,5	48,5	1942
118.	Georgia Grapsa (GRE)	2049	42b0	9w0	127b½	141w1	116b1	54w0	59b0	99w0	133w1	107b½	93w0	4	0	52,5	55,5	2005
119.	Elīna Otikova (LAT)	2049	35w½	14b0	90w0	139b½	83w0	134b1	133w½	126b1	96w½	84b0	0	4	0	51	54	2042
120.	Ece Ozbay (TUR)	2035	36b½	29w0	59b0	82w½	130b0	140w1	122b0	135w1	85b½	98w½	104b0	4	0	51	53,5	1994
121.	Karina Azimova (RUS)	2072	66w0	38b0	135w1	84b0	134w1	102b½	83w0	133b1	68w0	109b½	96w0	4	0	50	53,5	2012
122.	Linda Krūmiņa (LAT)	2090	34w0	41b0	134w0	128b1	139w1	96b0	120w1	60b0	123w1	64b0	101w0	4	0	50	53	1980
123.	Agnese Līckrastiņa (LAT)	2223	28w0	135b1	36b0	132w½	133b½	131w1	41b0	25w0	122b0	134w1	100b0	4	0	49,5	53	1957
124.	Regina Narva (EST)	2000	60w0	72b0	128w1	56b0	117w1	101b0	109w½	98b0	127w½	113b0	141w1	4	0	49	52	1934
125.	Margarita Parhomenko (LAT)	1987	88b0	81w0	144b1	109b0	104w½	112w1	63b0	110b0	107w0	135w½	139b1	4	0	46	46,5	1912
126.	Ingūna Erneste (LAT)	2168	22b0	141w1	54b0	133w½	91b0	127w1	94b0	119w0	134b0	138b½	140w1	4	0	44,5	47	1859
127.	Madara Golsta (LAT)	1619	69w0	64b0	118w½	111b½	129w½	126b0	112b0	142w1	124b½	100w0	143b1	4	0	44	46	1907
128.	Rebeka Atte (LAT)	1498	94b0	105w0	124b0	122w0	144w1	129b1	85b0	116w0	117b0	-1	138w1	4	0	42	42,5	1888
129.	Marija Šibajeva (LTU)	2011	48b0	76w0	141b½	108w0	127b½	128w0	140b1	143w1	112b0	139w1	98b0	4	0	41,5	43,5	1753
130.	Camille De Seroux (SUI)	2122	37w½	57b½	41w0	43b0	120w1	83b½	64w1	97b0	58w0	114b0	103w0	3½	0	57,5	61,5	2131
131.	Maria Heinatz (SUI)	1990	25b0	83w0	136b1	101b1	39w0	123b0	115w½	112w½	104b0	117w0	135b½	3½	0	50,5	53,5	1955
132.	Elizabete Limanovska (LAT)	1990	17w0	84b0	143w1	123b½	64w0	117b1	102w0	115b0	109w0	133b1	111w0	3½	0	49,5	51,5	1963
133.	Nellija Maklakova (LAT)	1829	54b0	32w0	63b1	126b½	123w½	51w0	119b½	121w0	118b0	132w0	144w1	3½	0	48,5	49	1940
134.	Marija Nikolajeva (LAT)	1673	73b0	75w0	122b1	105w0	121b0	119w0	142b½	141b1	126w1	123b0	115w0	3½	0	43,5	46	1932
135.	Sarabella Norlamo (FIN)	1619	45b0	123w0	121b0	63w0	141b0	136w1	144w1	120b0	138w½	125b½	131w½	3½	0	41	41,5	1777
136.	Eibhia Ni Mhuireagain (IRL)	1496	27w0	115b0	131w0	138w0	143b0	135b0	-1	117w0	144b1	141b½	142w1	3½	0	35,5	36	1606
137.	Maria Kouvatsou (GRE)	2016	14w½	95b0	117w½	102b0	101w0	139b1	84w1	0	0	0	0	3	0	52	55	2149
138.	Sandra Harlinska (LAT)	1881	58w0	55b0	114w0	136b1	82b0	116w1	111b0	84w0	135b½	126w½	128b0	3	0	47,5	50,5	1870
139.	Margarita Zvereva (RUS)	1771	89b0	59w½	85b0	119w½	122b0	137w0	116b0	140w1	143b1	129b0	125w0	3	0	45	47	1851
140.	Aulikki Ristoja (FIN)	1716	30w0	56b0	100w0	144b1	111w0	120b0	129w0	139b0	-1	143w1	126b0	3	0	41	41,5	1682
141.	Ramona Golsta (LAT)	1560	97w0	126b0	129w½	118b0	135w1	104b0	108b0	134w0	142b1	136w½	124b0	3	0	40,5	43	1758
142.	Valentīna Vainovska (LAT)	1792	65w0	102b0	110w0	143b1	115b0	63w0	134w½	127b0	141w0	144w1	136b0	2½	0	41	41,5	1598
143.	Katrīna Telma Ivanova (LAT)	1340	62b0	112w0	132b0	142w0	136w1	144b1	113w0	129b0	139w0	140b0	127w0	2	0	37,5	38	1564
144.	Natālija Mieze (LAT)	1223	39w0	113b0	125w0	140w0	128b0	143w0	135b0	-1	136w0	142b0	133b0	1	0	35,5	37	965
