= Soini =

Soini may refer to:

== People ==
=== Surname ===
- Emilia Soini, Finnish squash player
- Timo Soini, Finnish politician
- Voitto Soini, Finnish ice hockey player
- Yrjö Soini, Finnish journalist

=== Given name ===
- Soini Nikkinen, Finnish javelin thrower
- Soini Palasto, Finnish diplomat

=== Religion ===
- Soini (mythology), a giant in Finnish mythology

== Places ==
- Soini, Finland
