= Yrjö Rantanen =

Finnish chess player (1950–2021)

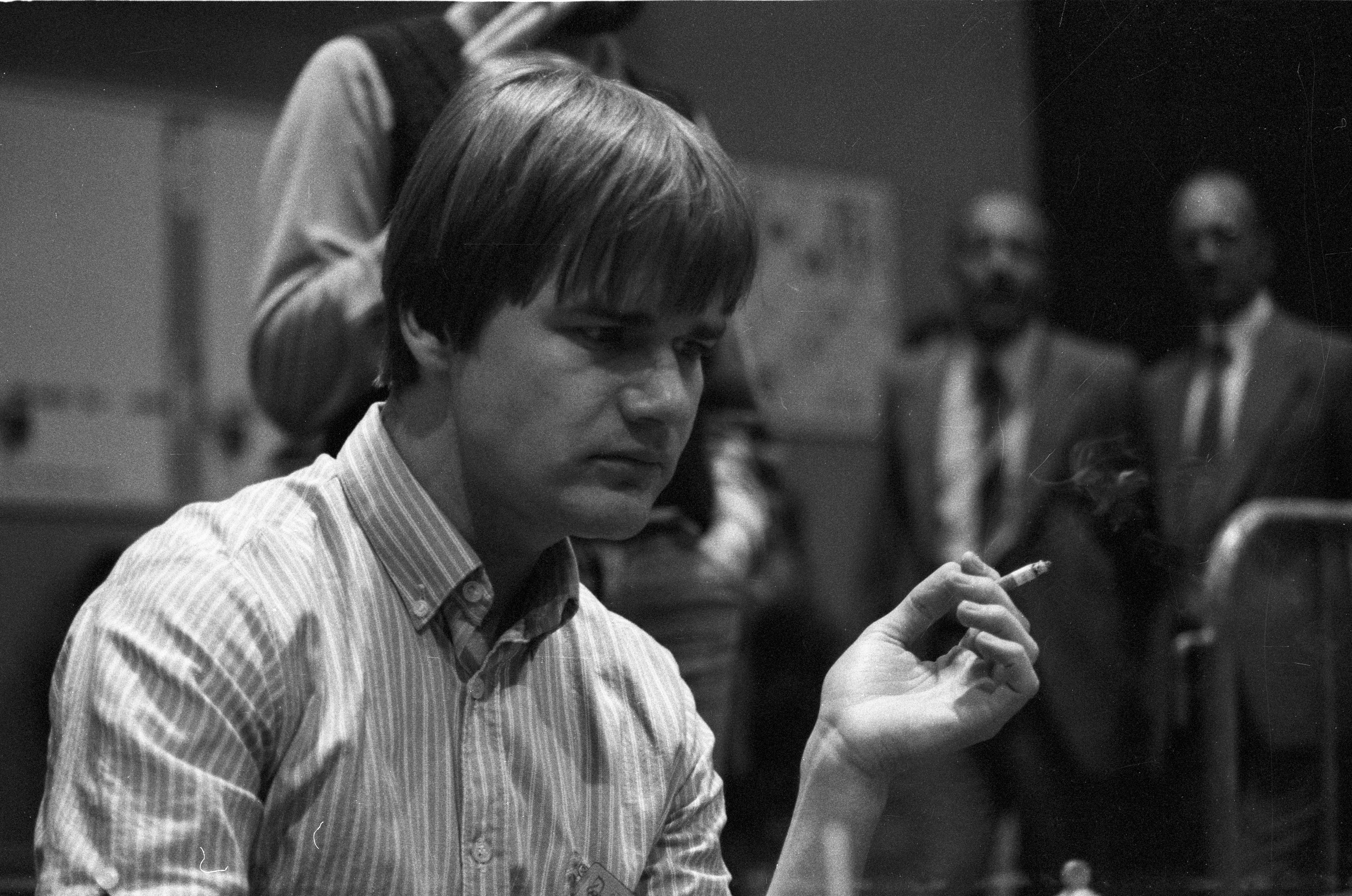

Personal information
- Born: Yrjö Aukusti Rantanen; 23 April 1950 Tampere, Finland
- Died: 14 January 2021 (aged 70)

Chess career
- Country: Finland
- Title: Grandmaster (1981)
- Peak rating: 2465 (July 1981)

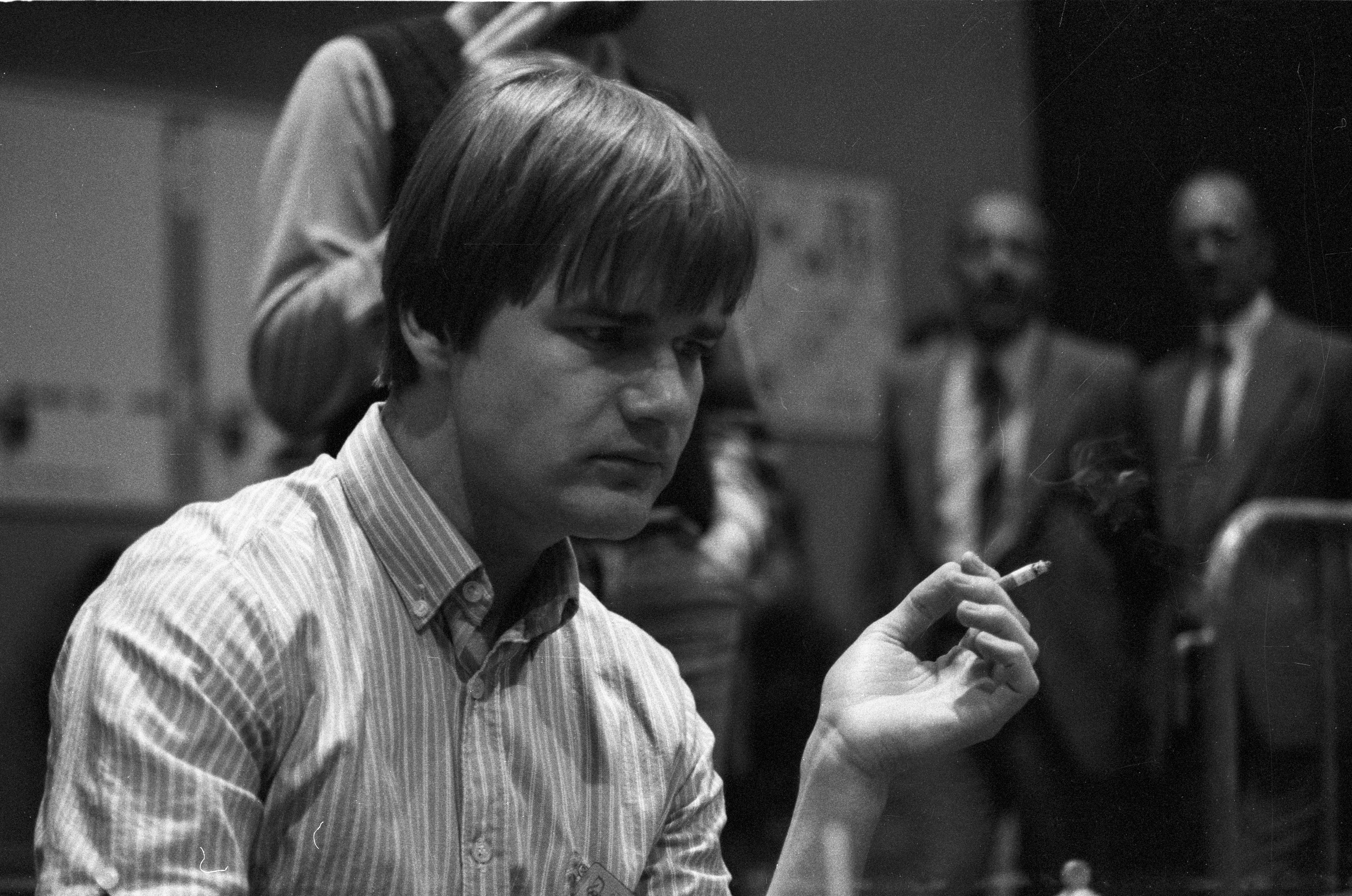
Yrjö Rantanen in Luzern 1982

Yrjö Aukusti Rantanen (23 April 1950 – 14 January 2021) was a Finnish chess player, who was awarded the title of grandmaster by FIDE in 1981. He was a two-time Finnish chess champion, and won three medals at the Chess Olympiad.

== Biography ==
Born in Tampere, Rantanen learned to play chess at the age of six from by his father, Matti Rantanen.

In the 1970s and 1980s, Rantanen was one of the top Finnish chess players. He has twice won gold medals at the Finnish Chess Championships (1978, 1986), three times won silver medals (1976, 1982, 1990) and won bronze medal in 1972. Yrjö Rantanen was the winner of many international chess tournaments, including 3rd place in Helsinki (1981), and won in Järvenpää (1982).

Yrjö Rantanen played for Finland in the Chess Olympiads:

- In 1972, at first reserve board in the 20th Chess Olympiad in Skopje (+11, =2, -2) and won individual bronze medal,
- In 1974, at third board in the 21st Chess Olympiad in Nice (+8, =3, -6),
- In 1976, at second board in the 22nd Chess Olympiad in Haifa (+3, =6, -2),
- In 1978, at second board in the 23rd Chess Olympiad in Buenos Aires (+5, =6, -0) and won individual bronze medal,
- In 1980, at second board in the 24th Chess Olympiad in La Valletta (+6, =7, -0) and won individual gold medal,
- In 1982, at first board in the 25th Chess Olympiad in Lucerne (+5, =1, -6),
- In 1984, at first board in the 26th Chess Olympiad in Thessaloniki (+2, =5, -4),
- In 1986, at second board in the 27th Chess Olympiad in Dubai (+6, =3, -3),
- In 1990, at fourth board in the 29th Chess Olympiad in Novi Sad (+6, =3, -3).

Yrjö Rantanen played for Finland in the European Team Chess Championship:

- In 1989, at sixth board in the 9th European Team Chess Championship in Haifa (+4, =1, -1) and won individual bronze medal.

Yrjö Rantanen played for Finland in the Nordic Chess Cups:

- In 1973, at third board in the 4th Nordic Chess Cup in Ribe (+1, =0, -4),
- In 1974, at second board in the 5th Nordic Chess Cup in Eckernförde (+1, =3, -1),
- In 1975, at second board in the 6th Nordic Chess Cup in Hindås (+2, =2, -1) and won team bronze and individual gold medals,
- In 1977, at first board in the 8th Nordic Chess Cup in Glücksburg (+0, =1, -4),
- In 1985, at second board in the 10th Nordic Chess Cup in Pohja (+3, =2, -2),
- In 1989, at second board in the 12th Nordic Chess Cup in Aabybro (+3, =2, -2).

In 1977 he was awarded the title of international master (IM) and in 1981 that of international grandmaster (GM). Rantanen became the second Finnish chess grandmaster after Heikki Westerinen.
