= Sirkka-Liisa Landry =

Finnish chess player (1926–2008)

Personal information
- Born: 22 November 1926 Kivennapa, Finland
- Died: 19 January 2008 (aged 81) Kauniainen, Finland

Chess career
- Country: Finland
- Peak rating: 2045 (January 1987)

Sirkka-Liisa Landry (née Vuorenpää; 22 November 1926 – 19 January 2008) was a Finnish chess player, Finnish Women's Chess Championship sixteen-times winner, Nordic Women's Chess Championship three-times winner.

== Biography ==
Vuorenpää was born in Kivennapa in Karelia. At the age of 15, in the summer of 1942, she stepped onto a mine while gathering berries in the woods. She lost her left leg from the knee down and had to spend a long time in a military hospital where other patients taught her chess. After leaving the hospital, Vuorenpää finished school in Lammi and then moved to Helsinki where she worked as a postal clerk. In Helsinki, she also had better opportunities to play chess.

In 1954, Vuorenpää was fourth in her first Finnish Women's Chess Championship. But in 1957 she won this tournament for the first time. She won the Finnish Women's Chess Championship sixteen times: 1957−1973, 1975−1976, 1981, 1986. Also she won silver (1988) and three bronze medals (1983, 1987, 1989) in this tournament. Vuorenpää won Nordic Women's Chess Championship three times: 1957, 1959 and 1967. In 1975, in Karlovy Vary she participated in FIDE Women's World Chess Championship Zonal Tournament.

Sirkka-Liisa Landry played for Finland in the Women's Chess Olympiads:

- In 1957, at first board in the 1st Chess Olympiad (women) in Emmen (+2, =4, -5),
- In 1972, at first board in the 5th Chess Olympiad (women) in Skopje (+4, =3, -4),
- In 1974, at second board in the 6th Chess Olympiad (women) in Medellín (+5, =3, -4),
- In 1976, at first board in the 7th Chess Olympiad (women) in Haifa (+4, =6, -1),
- In 1978, at first board in the 8th Chess Olympiad (women) in Buenos Aires (+3, =2, -6),
- In 1980, at first board in the 9th Chess Olympiad (women) in Valletta (+5, =4, -2),
- In 1982, at first board in the 10th Chess Olympiad (women) in Lucerne (+2, =3, -5),
- In 1984, at third board in the 26th Chess Olympiad (women) in Thessaloniki (+3, =8, -1),
- In 1986, at first board in the 27th Chess Olympiad (women) in Dubai (+5, =4, -3),
- In 1988, at second board in the 28th Chess Olympiad (women) in Thessaloniki (+3, =1, -5).

Sirkka-Liisa Landry played for Finland in the Nordic Chess Cups:

- In 1971, at sixth board in the 2nd Nordic Chess Cup in Großenbrode (+1, =3, -1),
- In 1973, at fifth board in the 4th Nordic Chess Cup in Ribe (+0, =4, -1),
- In 1977, at fifth board in the 8th Nordic Chess Cup in Glücksburg (+2, =1, -2).

In the late 1970s, Vuorenpää married French diplomat Jacques Landry and changed her surname to Landry. She first moved to the Netherlands after her husband started a new job there. After her husband retired, they moved to Portugal. Landry spent her last years at Kauniala Military Injury Hospital in Kauniainen, Finland, where she died.
