= Niina Koskela =

Finnish chess player (born 1971)

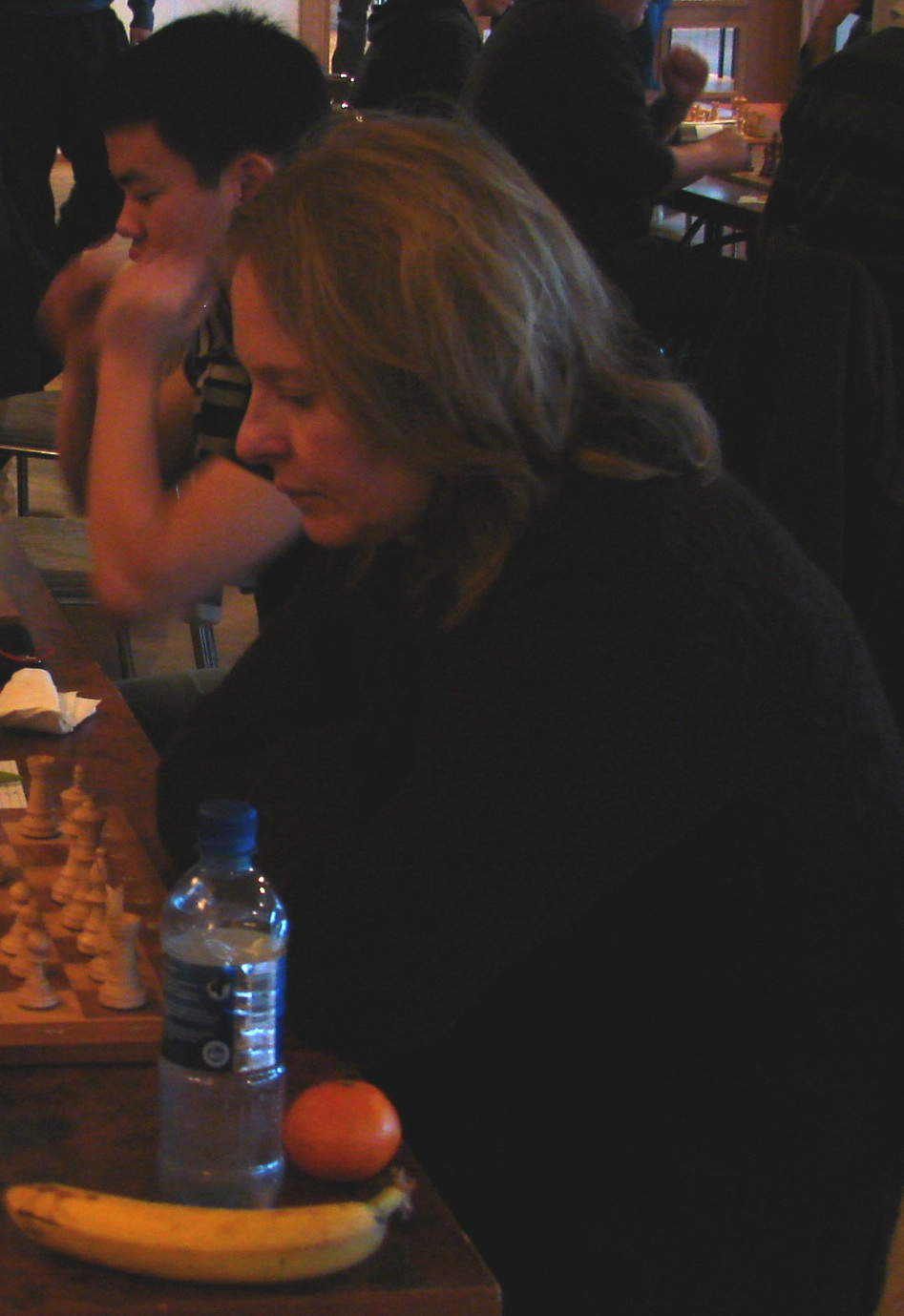
- Koskela in 2009

Personal information
- Born: 8 August 1971 (age 54)

Chess career
- Country: Finland (until 2012); Norway (since 2012)
- Title: Woman Grandmaster (2006)
- FIDE rating: 2199 (May 2023)
- Peak rating: 2312 (April 2003)

Niina Koskela (born 8 August 1971), married from 2004 to 2009 as Niina Sammalvuo, is a Finnish chess player. In 2006, she was the first Finnish woman to receive the FIDE title of Woman Grandmaster (WGM). She is a three-time winner of the Finnish Women's Chess Championship (1990, 2002, 2008). Since 2012, she has played for Norway.

== Biography ==
Koskela was a participant in numerous Finnish Women's Chess Championships, won three gold medals (1990, 2002, 2008) and three silver medals (1989, 1992, 1994). In 1991, in Subotica, Niina Koskela participated in Women's World Chess Championship Interzonal Tournament and ranked in 34th place. In 2000, Niina Koskela participated in Women's World Chess Championship by a knock-out system and in the first round won Subbaraman Vijayalakshmi but in the second round lost to Nana Ioseliani.

She played for Finland and Norway in the Women's Chess Olympiads:

- In 1990, at second board in the 29th Chess Olympiad (women) in Novi Sad (+4, =4, -5),
- In 1992, at second board in the 30th Chess Olympiad (women) in Manila (+5, =5, -4),
- In 1998, at second board in the 33rd Chess Olympiad (women) in Elista (+7, =4, -1) and won individual bronze medal,
- In 2002, at first board in the 35th Chess Olympiad (women) in Bled (+6, =6, -2),
- In 2004, at first board in the 36th Chess Olympiad (women) in Calvià (+6, =6, -2),
- In 2006, at first board in the 37th Chess Olympiad (women) in Turin (+6, =6, -0),
- In 2008, at first board in the 38th Chess Olympiad (women) in Dresden (+4, =2, -3),
- In 2014, at fourth board in the 41st Chess Olympiad (women) in Tromsø (+5, =4, -0).

Koskela played for Finland and Norway in the European Team Chess Championships:

- In 1992, at second board in the 1st European Team Chess Championship (women) in Debrecen (+5, =3, -1) and won individual silver medal,
- In 1999, at first board in the 3rd European Team Chess Championship (women) in Batumi (+1, =3, -4),
- In 2003, at first board in the 5th European Team Chess Championship (women) in Plovdiv (+3, =2, -3),
- In 2007, at first board in the 7th European Team Chess Championship (women) in Heraklion (+1, =1, -2),
- In 2015, at second board in the 11th European Team Chess Championship (women) in Reykjavík (+3, =4, -1).
