= Finnish Chess Championship =

Chess competition in Finland

The Finnish Chess Championship is the national championship in chess in Finland.

== Winners ==
Year	Host city	Winner
1922	Helsinki	Anatol Tschepurnoff
1928	Viipuri	Anatol Tschepurnoff
1931	Helsinki	Eero Böök
1932	Helsinki	Ragnar Krogius
1933	Helsinki	Birger Axel Rasmusson
1934	Helsinki	Eero Böök
1935	Helsinki	Eero Böök
1936	Helsinki	Eero Böök
1937	Helsinki	Thorsten Gauffin
1938	Helsinki	Toivo Salo
1939	Helsinki	Osmo Kaila
1945	Helsinki	Ilmari Solin
1946	Helsinki	Eero Böök
1947	Helsinki	Jalo Aatos Fred
1948	Turku	Aarne Ilmari Niemelä
1949	Helsinki	Toivo Salo
1950	Helsinki	Kaarle Ojanen
1951	Helsinki	Kaarle Ojanen
1952	Helsinki	Kaarle Ojanen
1953	Helsinki	Kaarle Ojanen
1954	Helsinki	Osmo Kaila
1955	Helsinki	Jalo Aatos Fred
1956	Helsinki	Toivo Salo
1957	Helsinki	Kaarle Ojanen
1958	Helsinki	Kaarle Ojanen
1959	Turku	Kaarle Ojanen
1960	Helsinki	Kaarle Ojanen
1961	Helsinki	Kaarle Ojanen
1962	Helsinki	Kaarle Ojanen
1963	Helsinki	Eero Böök
1964	Helsinki	Ilkka Antero Kanko
1965	Helsinki	Heikki Westerinen
1966	Naantali	Heikki Westerinen
1967	Helsinki	Kaarle Ojanen
1968	Helsinki	Heikki Westerinen
1969	Helsinki	Mauri Olavi Sirkiä
1970	Helsinki	Heikki Westerinen
1971	Helsinki	Ilkka Sarén
1972	Helsinki	Kaarle Ojanen
1974	Helsinki	Pertti Kalervo Poutiainen
1976	Helsinki	Pertti Kalervo Poutiainen
1978	Helsinki	Yrjö Aukusti Rantanen
1980	Järvenpää	Jorma Paavo Äijälä
1982	Helsinki	Veijo Mäki
1983	Helsinki	Kaarle Ojanen
1984	Helsinki	Antti Pyhälä
1985	Espoo	Jouni Yrjölä
1986	Pori	Yrjö Aukusti Rantanen
1987	Jyväskylä	Mika Ebeling
1988	Helsinki	Jouni Yrjölä
1989	Tampere	Antti Pyhälä
1990	Helsinki	Veijo Mäki
1991	Tampere	Joose Norri
1992	Helsinki	Esko Matti Hakulinen
1993	Naantali	Marko Manninen
1994	Helsinki	Joose Norri
1995	Helsinki	Joose Norri
1996	Helsinki	Joose Norri
1997	Helsinki	Antti Pihlajasalo
1998	Karhula	Tapani Sammalvuo
1999	Vammala	Olli Salmensuu
2000	Helsinki	Aleksei Holmsten
2001	Helsinki	Joose Norri
2002	Helsinki	Mika Karttunen
2003	Helsinki	Heikki Lehtinen
2004	Espoo	Heikki Lehtinen
2005	Lahti	Tapani Sammalvuo
2006	Helsinki	Mika Karttunen
2007	Helsinki	Mika Karttunen
2008	Mantta	Tomi Nybäck
2009	Tampere	Mika Karttunen
2010	Helsinki	Mika Karttunen
2011	Helsinki	Mikael Agopov
2012	Helsinki	Vilka Sipilä
2013	Mantta	Mika Karttunen
2014	Helsinki	Mika Karttunen
2015	Kalajoki	Mikael Agopov
2016	Helsinki	Vilka Sipilä
2017	Helsinki	Teemu Virtanen
2018	Helsinki	Mikael Agopov
2019	Helsinki	Toivo Keinänen
2020	-	-
2021	Sastamala	Toivo Keinänen
2022	Helsinki	Pekka Köykkä
2023	Helsinki	Toivo Keinänen
2024	Helsinki	Toivo Keinänen
2025	Helsinki	Toivo Keinänen

== Women's winners ==
Year	Host city	Gold	Silver	Bronze
1957	Helsinki	Sirkka-Liisa Vuorenpää	Inga Lindh	Meri Fager
1958	Helsinki	Sirkka-Liisa Vuorenpää	Raija Eklund	Meri Fager
1959	Helsinki	Sirkka-Liisa Vuorenpää	Raija Eklund	Astrid Illukka
1960	Helsinki	Sirkka-Liisa Vuorenpää	Astrid Illukka	Anna-Liisa Korhonen
1961	-			
1962	Helsinki	Sirkka-Liisa Vuorenpää	Anna-Liisa Korhonen	Anni Kontkanen
1963	Helsinki	Sirkka-Liisa Vuorenpää	Astrid Illukka	Inga Lindh
1964	Helsinki	Sirkka-Liisa Vuorenpää	Inga Lindh	Anni Kontkanen
1965− 1968	-			
1969	Helsinki	Sirkka-Liisa Vuorenpää	Astrid Illukka	Anni Kontkanen
1970	Helsinki	Sirkka-Liisa Vuorenpää	Eeva Kuhlberg	Astrid Illukka
1971	Helsinki	Sirkka-Liisa Vuorenpää	Johanna Tuomainen	Marjatta Palasto
1972	Helsinki	Sirkka-Liisa Vuorenpää	Aulikki Näsänen	Liisa Kulmala
1973	Helsinki	Sirkka-Liisa Vuorenpää	Marjatta Palasto	Meeri Hakala
1974	Helsinki	Johanna Tuomainen	M. Palasto/A. Lehtimäki	-
1975	Riihimäki	Sirkka-Liisa Vuorenpää	Marjatta Palasto	Kaarina Sulamäki
1976	Helsinki	Sirkka-Liisa Vuorenpää	Aulikki Ristoja	Pirkko Pihlajamäki
1977	-			
1978	Helsinki	Marjatta Palasto	Leena Laitinen	Aulikki Ristoja
1979	Helsinki	Aulikki Ristoja	Ritva-Liisa Savan	Hannele Järveläinen
1980	Järvenpää	Marjatta Palasto	Leena Laitinen	Aulikki Ristoja
1981	Espoo	Sirkka-Liisa Landry	M. Palasto/A. Ristoja	-
1982	Helsinki	Leena Laitinen	Pirkko Pihlajamäki	Ritva-Liisa Savan
1983	Helsinki	Leena Laitinen	Aulikki Ristoja	Sirkka-Liisa Landry
1984	Helsinki	Leena Laitinen	Marjatta Kujasalo	Pirkko Pihlajamäki
1985	Espoo	Päivi Walta	Hannele Järveläinen	Aulikki Ristoja
1986	Pori	Sirkka-Liisa Landry	Päivi Walta	Johanna Paasikangas
1987	Jyväskylä	Päivi Walta	Aulikki Ristoja	Sirkka-Liisa Landry
1988	Helsinki	Aulikki Ristoja	Sirkka-Liisa Landry	Johanna Paasikangas
1989	Tampere	Johanna Paasikangas	Niina Koskela	Sirkka-Liisa Landry
1990	Helsinki	Niina Koskela	Johanna Paasikangas	Urda Fogel
1991	Helsinki	Johanna Paasikangas	Päivi Walta	Kirsi Säynäjäkangas
1992	Helsinki	Johanna Paasikangas	Niina Koskela	Päivi Walta
1993	Naantali	Johanna Paasikangas	Heini Puuska	Marjatta Kujasalo
1994	Helsinki	Johanna Paasikangas	Niina Koskela	Päivi Walta
1995	Helsinki	Päivi Walta	Tanja Rantanen	Sari Rautanen
1996	Helsinki	Heini Puuska	Johanna Paasikangas	Sari Rautanen
1997	Helsinki	Tanja Rantanen	Sari Rautanen	Aulikki Ristoja
1998	Karhula	Tanja Rantanen	Päivi Walta	Heini Puuska
1999	Vammala	Tanja Rantanen	Sonja Lindholm	Aulikki Ristoja
2000	Helsinki	Aulikki Ristoja	Päivi Walta	Sonja Lindholm
2001	Helsinki	Päivi Walta	Marjatta Kujasalo	Kirsi Lindstedt
2002	Helsinki	Niina Koskela	Heini Puuska	Ilse Rönnberg
2003	-			
2004	Espoo	Heini Puuska	Päivi Walta	Sari Rautanen
2005	Helsinki	Sari Rautanen	Päivi Walta	Laura Savola
2006	-			
2007	Jyväskylä	Laura Savola	Sari Rautanen	Heini Puuska
2008	Mantta	Niina Sammalvuo	Heini Puuska	Erika Uusitupa
2009	-			
2010	Helsinki	Qiyu Zhou	Maria Larionova	Katariina Larionova
2011	Helsinki	Irina Tumanova	Maria Larionova	Katariina Larionova
2012	Helsinki	Tanja Tuominen	Heini Puuska	Anastasia Nazarova
2013	Mantta	Tanja Tuominen	Heini Puuska	Anastasia Nazarova
2014	Helsinki	Heini Puuska	Alia Dannenberg	Anastasia Nazarova
2015		Anastasia Nazarova		
2016	Helsinki	Anastasia Nazarova	Alia Dannenberg	Tiina Turunen
2017		Anastasia Nazarova	Alia Dannenberg	Sarabella Norlamo
2018	Helsinki	Anastasia Nazarova	Alia Dannenberg	Sarabella Norlamo
2019	Helsinki	Anastasia Nazarova	Alia Dannenberg	Sarabella Norlamo
2020	-			
2021	Sastamala	Sarabella Norlamo	Johanna Tanni	Maria Oksanen
2022	Helsinki	Anastasia Nazarova	Sara-Olivia Sippola	Sarabella Norlamo
2023	Helsinki	Sara-Olivia Sippola	Lilja Bererdin	Sarabella Norlamo
2024	Helsinki	Anastasia Nazarova-Keinänen	Heljä Lehtinen	Pauliina Pelander
2025	Helsinki	Anastasia Nazarova-Keinänen	Lilja Bererdin	Tanja Tuominen
