= Ilmari Solin =

Finnish chess player

Personal information
- Born: 16 September 1905 Tallinn, Estonia
- Died: 20 June 1976 (aged 70) Helsinki, Finland

Chess career
- Country: Finland

Hugo Ilmari Solin (19 September 1905 – 20 June 1976) was a Finnish chess player, Finnish Chess Championship winner (1945).

== Biography ==
Hugo Ilmari Solin was born in a Finnish family living in Revel (at that time - the territory of the Russian Empire). He lived in Estonia, and in 1925 he moved to Finland to undergo urgent military service. He stayed in Finland for permanent residence. From the end the 1930s to begin the 1950 Solin was one of Finland's leading chess players. In 1945, in Helsinki he won Finnish Chess Championship. Also he twice shared 2nd place in Finnish Chess Championships: in 1946 and in 1954. In 1954, in Prague Solin participated in FIDE Zonal tournament where he ranked in 19th place.

Solin played for Finland in the Chess Olympiads:

- In 1935, at third board in the 6th Chess Olympiad in Warsaw (+7, =3, -7),
- In 1937, at third board in the 7th Chess Olympiad in Stockholm (+2, =2, -7).

Solin played for Finland in the unofficial Chess Olympiad:

- In 1936, at third board in the 3rd unofficial Chess Olympiad in Munich (+5, =9, -5).
