= Filiz Osmanodja =

German chess player (born 1996)

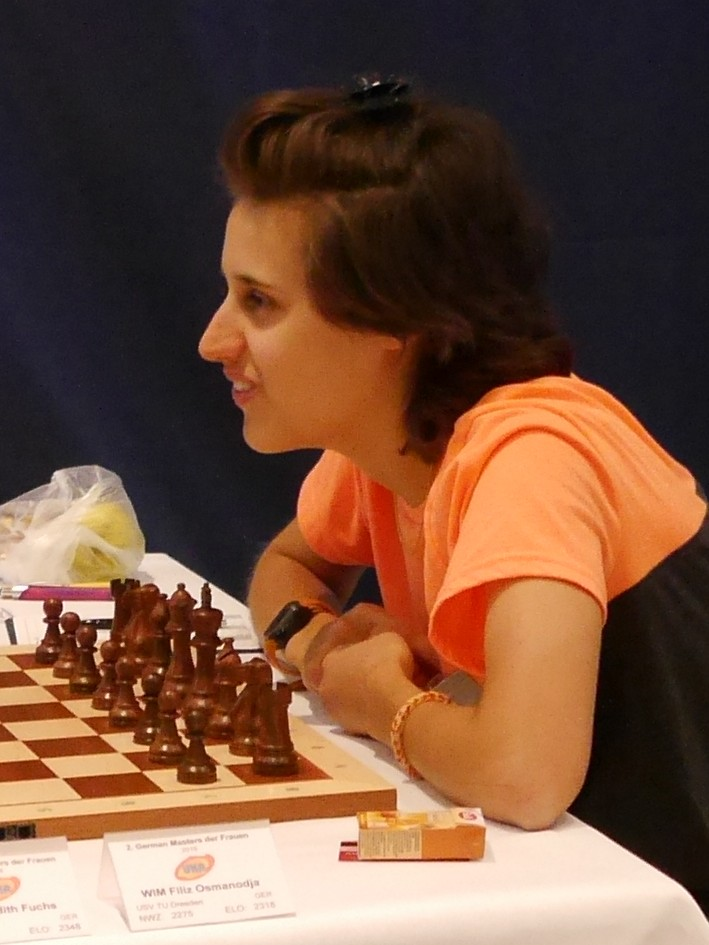
- Osmanodja in 2016

Personal information
- Born: 7 March 1996 (age 30) Dresden, Germany

Chess career
- Country: Germany
- Title: Woman Grandmaster (2019)
- FIDE rating: 2256 (September 2020)
- Peak rating: 2370 (April 2017)

Filiz Osmanodja (born 7 March 1996) is a German chess player who holds the title of Woman Grandmaster (WGM, 2019).

== Early life ==
Osmanodja was born in Dresden, Germany, into an ethnic Turkish family from Bulgaria.

== Chess career ==
Filiz Osmanodja is multiple winner of the German Youth Chess Championship. In 2004, 2005 and 2006 she won the girls U10 age group, but in 2008 she was in the first in girls U12 age group. Filiz Osmanodja repeatedly represented Germany at the European Youth Chess Championships and World Youth Chess Championships in different age groups, where she won four silver medals:

- in 2008 European Youth Chess Championship in girls U12 age group;
- in 2008 World Youth Chess Championship in girls U12 age group;
- in 2009 European Youth Chess Championship in girls U14 age group;
- in 2014 World Youth Chess Championship in girls U18 age group.

Osmanodja played for Germany in the European Girls' U18 Team Chess Championship, where she has participated 3 times (2008-2010), and won team silver medal (2009) and individual gold (2009) and bronze (2010) medals.

In 2017, in Riga she participated in Women's European Individual Chess Championship.

Osmanodja played for Germany-3 team in the Women's Chess Olympiad:

- In 2008, at reserve board in the 38th Chess Olympiad (women) in Dresden (+4, =0, -5).

She played for Germany in the European Team Chess Championships:

- In 2015, at second board in the 11th European Team Chess Championship (women) in Reykjavík (+1, =2, -3).

In 2013, she received the FIDE Woman International Master (WIM) title, and in 2019, the FIDE Woman Grandmaster title.
