= Charles Pirie =

Scottish chess player

Personal information
- Born: 8 January 1897 Aberdeen, Scotland
- Died: 3 February 1960 (aged 63) Aberdeen, Scotland

Chess career
- Country: United Kingdom

Charles Pirie (8 January 1897 – 3 February 1960) was a Scottish chess player.

== Biography ==
Charles Pirie graduated from University of Aberdeen in 1920. He worked as a mathematics teacher all his life.

Charles Pirie took an active part in the work of the Aberdeen chess club Bon-Accord CC. His most notable organizing work is related to the Scottish Chess Championship of 1939, held in Aberdeen.

Charles Pirie played for Scotland in the Chess Olympiad:

- In 1937, at reserve board in the 7th Chess Olympiad in Stockholm (+0, =1, -9).
