= Johanna Tuomainen =

Finnish chess player

Personal information
- Born: unknown
- Died: unknown

Chess career
- Country: Finland

Johanna Tuomainen (unknown – unknown) was a Finnish chess player, Finnish Women Chess Championship winner (1974).

== Biography ==
In the 1970s, Johanna Tuomainen was one of Finland's leading chess players. In Finnish Chess Championships she has won gold (1974) and silver (1971) medals.

Johanna Tuomainen played for Finland in the Women's Chess Olympiads:

- In 1972, at second board in the 5th Chess Olympiad (women) in Skopje (+1, =1, -5),
- In 1974, at first board in the 6th Chess Olympiad (women) in Medellín (+1, =2, -5).

Johanna Tuomainen played for Finland in the Nordic Chess Cups:

- In 1974, at sixth board in the 5th Nordic Chess Cup in Eckernförde (+0, =2, -3),
- In 1975, at fifth board in the 6th Nordic Chess Cup in Hindås (+0, =2, -3) and won team bronze medal.
