= Viesturs Meijers =

Latvian chess grandmaster (1967–2024)

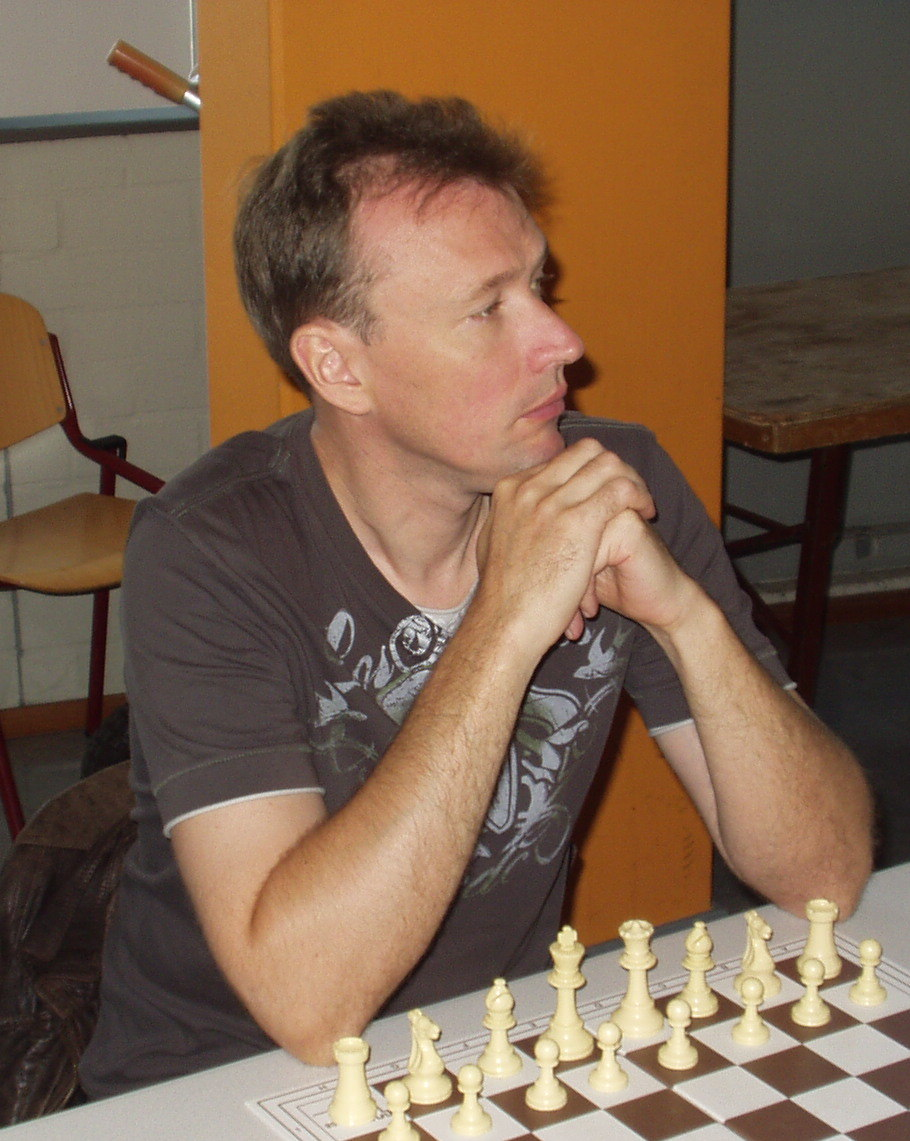
- Meijers in 2007

Personal information
- Born: 5 December 1967 Limbaži, Latvian SSR, USSR
- Died: 9 November 2024 (aged 56)

Chess career
- Country: Latvia
- Title: Grandmaster (2004)
- Peak rating: 2529 (January 2006)

Viesturs Meijers (5 December 1967 – 9 November 2024) was a Latvian chess Grandmaster (2004). He starting playing chess at age 10 and his first trainer was I. Dambitis. Meijers became an International Master in 1993 and won the Latvian Chess Championship in 2000. From 1989 to 2010, he participated in more than 80 international tournaments.

== Biography ==
Meijers played for Latvia in the Chess Olympiads:

- In 2000, at fourth board in the 34th Chess Olympiad in Istanbul (+3, =7, -3);
- In 2004, at reserve board in the 36th Chess Olympiad in Calvia (+5, =2, -2);
- In 2006, at fourth board in the 37th Chess Olympiad in Turin (+3, =3, -4);
- In 2008, at third board in the 38th Chess Olympiad in Dresden (+5, =3, -1);
- In 2010, at third board in the 39th Chess Olympiad in Khanty-Mansiysk (+3, =3, -3).

He also played for Latvia in the European Team Chess Championship:

- In 2001, at first reserve board in León (+3, =3, -1).

Viesturs Meijers was married to Woman International Master Agnese Meijere. He died on 9 November 2024, at the age of 56.
