= George Wheatcroft (chess player) =

English lawyer and chess player

Personal information
- Born: 29 October 1905
- Died: 2 December 1987 (aged 82)

Chess career
- Country: England

George Shorrock Ashcombe "Ash" Wheatcroft (29 October 1905 – 2 December 1987) was an English professor of law and chess master.

== Biography ==
Wheatcroft studied at New College in the University of Oxford and subsequently qualified as a solicitor, practising from 1930 to 1951. During World War II he served in the Royal Army Service Corps with the eventual rank of lieutenant-colonel. From 1951 to 1959 he was a Chancery Master. From 1959 to 1968 he was Professor of English Law at the London School of Economics.

In 1935, Wheatcroft won the British Correspondence chess championship. He participated in international chess tournaments in Plymouth (1938) and Margate (1939). From 1953 to 1956 he was President of the British Chess Federation.

Wheatcroft played for England in 1937 in the 7th Chess Olympiad in Stockholm, at reserve board (+4, =1, -8).

His son was Timothy Martin Wheatcroft (25 January 1934 – 13 June 1987) who was also a chess player, a participant in the British Chess Championship in 1963 (5½ out of 11, shared 13th – 18th place).
