= Camille De Seroux =

Swiss chess player (born 1993)

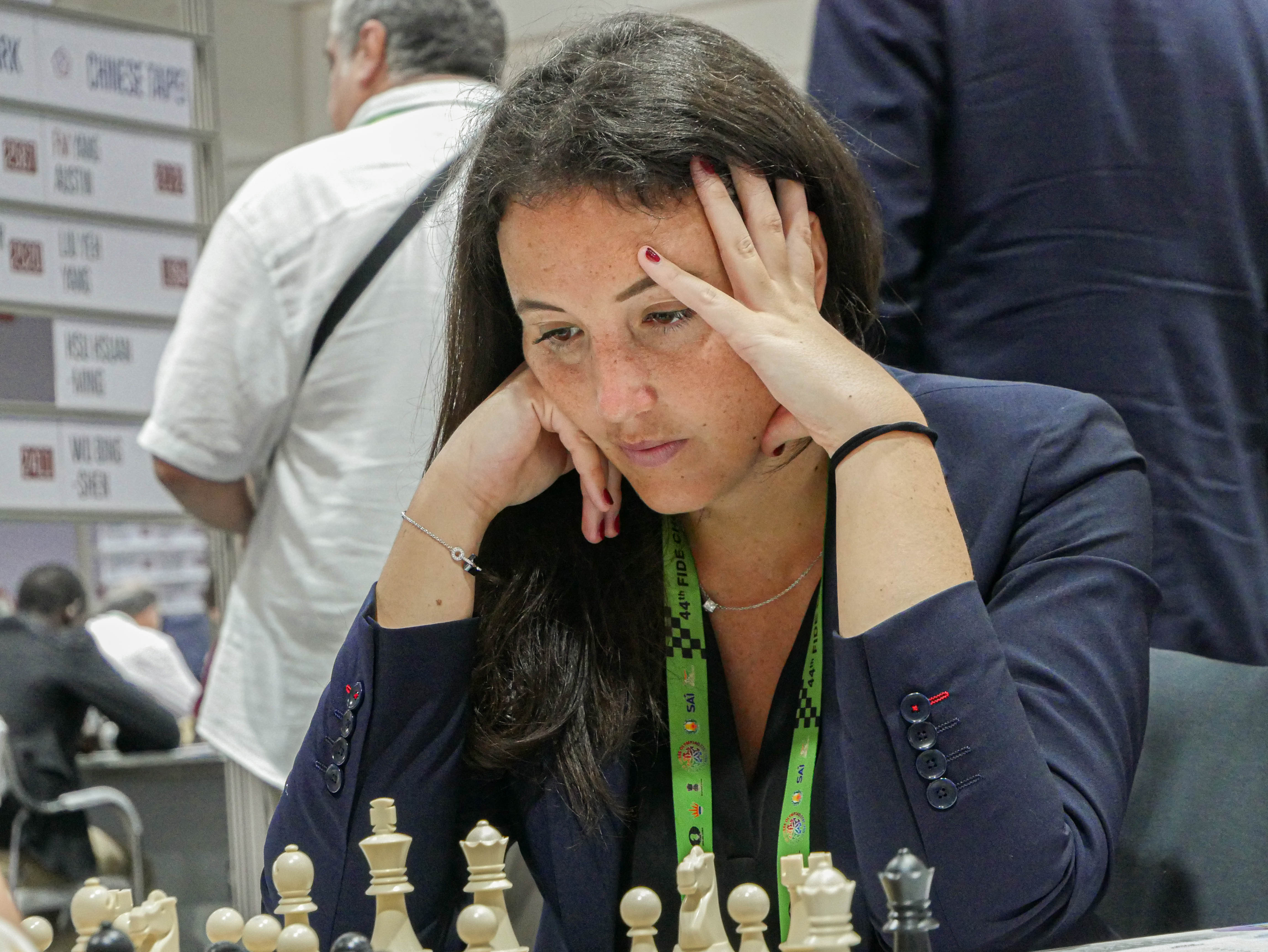
- De Seroux in 2022

Personal information
- Born: 2 October 1993 (age 32)

Chess career
- Country: Switzerland
- Title: Woman International Master (2020)
- Peak rating: 2184 (December 2017)

Camille De Seroux (born 2 October 1993) is a Swiss chess player. She received the FIDE title of Woman International Master (WIM) in 2020.

== Biography ==
Camille De Seroux five times won Swiss Youth Chess Championship in different girls age group: U12 (2005, 2006) and U16 (2007, 2008, 2009). In Swiss Women's Chess Championship she two times ranked second (2010, 2014) and once ranked third (2011).

In 2017, in Riga Camille De Seroux participated in Women's European Individual Chess Championship.

Camille De Seroux played for Switzerland in the Women's Chess Olympiads:

- In 2010, at reserve board in the 39th Chess Olympiad (women) in Khanty-Mansiysk (+5, =1, -3),
- In 2012, at fourth board in the 40th Chess Olympiad (women) in Istanbul (+5, =1, -4),
- In 2014, at fourth board in the 41st Chess Olympiad (women) in Tromsø (+3, =1, -4),
- In 2016, at fourth board in the 42nd Chess Olympiad (women) in Baku (+4, =3, -1),
- In 2018, at fourth board in the 43rd Chess Olympiad (women) in Batumi (+6, =0, -3).

Camille De Seroux played for Switzerland in the European Team Chess Championships:

- In 2011, at third board in the 9th European Team Chess Championship (women) in Porto Carras (+3, =1, -5),
- In 2013, at fourth board in the 10th European Team Chess Championship (women) in Warsaw (+2, =1, -5),
- In 2015, at third board in the 11th European Team Chess Championship (women) in Reykjavík (+3, =0, -4),
- In 2017, at third board in the 12th European Team Chess Championship (women) in Crete (+4, =1, -3).
- In 2019, at third board in the 13th European Team Chess Championship (women) in Batumi (+4, =5, -0).
