= Ernst Sørensen (chess player) =

Danish chess player

Personal information
- Born: unknown
- Died: unknown

Chess career
- Country: Denmark

Ernst Sørensen (unknown — unknown) was a Danish chess player, Danish Chess Championship medalist (1940).

== Biography ==
In the 1930s and 1940s, Ernst Sørensen was one of the leading Danish chess players. From 1934 to 1948 he participated in the Danish Chess Championships, which he achieved his better result in 1940 when he won a bronze medal.

Ernst Sørensen played for Denmark in the Chess Olympiads:

- In 1935, at reserve board in the 6th Chess Olympiad in Warsaw (+4, =4, -5),
- In 1937, at second board in the 7th Chess Olympiad in Stockholm (+0, =7, -10),
- In 1939, at fourth board in the 8th Chess Olympiad in Buenos Aires (+5, =7, -7).

Ernst Sørensen played for Denmark in the unofficial Chess Olympiad:

- In 1936, at sixth board in the 3rd unofficial Chess Olympiad in Munich (+5, =5, -8).
