= Johanna Paasikangas-Tella =

Finnish chess player (born 1974)

Personal information
- Born: 28 March 1974 (age 52) Forssa, Finland

Chess career
- Country: Finland
- Title: Woman International Master (1991)
- Peak rating: 2325 (July 1997)

Johanna Paasikangas-Tella (née Paasikangas, born 28 March 1974) is a Finnish chess player who holds the title of Woman International Master (WIM). She is a five-time winner of the Finnish Women's Chess Championship (1989, 1991, 1992, 1993, 1994).

== Biography ==
Chess has learned to play at the age of five. In 1988, she won second place in the Finnish Youth Chess Championship in the U16 girl's age group. Johanna Paasikangas-Tella participated in numerous Finnish Women's Chess Championships, in which she won five golds (1989, 1991, 1992, 1993, 1994), two silver (1990, 1996) and two bronze medals (1986, 1988). Johanna Paasikangas-Tella is a winner of many international chess tournaments, including won in 1995 Swiss-system tournament in Tampere, but in 1997, in Athens, she won the bronze medal at the European Women's Fast Chess Championship. In 2002, she won third place in Augsburg international chess tournament.

Johanna Paasikangas-Tella two times participated in the Women's World Chess Championship Interzonal Tournaments:

- In 1991, at Interzonal Tournament in Subotica has taken 30th place;
- In 1995, at Interzonal Tournament in Chişinău has taken 48th place.

Johanna Paasikangas-Tella played for Finland in the Women's Chess Olympiads:

- In 1986, at third board in the 27th Chess Olympiad (women) in Dubai (+4, =1, -5),
- In 1988, at third board in the 28th Chess Olympiad (women) in Thessaloniki (+8, =2, -3),
- In 1990, at first board in the 29th Chess Olympiad (women) in Novi Sad (+7, =2, -4),
- In 1992, at first board in the 30th Chess Olympiad (women) in Manila (+7, =2, -4),
- In 1994, at first reserve board in the 31st Chess Olympiad (women) in Moscow (+9, =2, -2),
- In 1996, at first board in the 32nd Chess Olympiad (women) in Yerevan (+7, =4, -3),
- In 1998, at first board in the 33rd Chess Olympiad (women) in Elista (+6, =2, -4),
- In 2000, at first board in the 34th Chess Olympiad (women) in Istanbul (+5, =0, -3).

Johanna Paasikangas-Tella played for Finland in the European Team Chess Championships:

- In 1992, at first board in the 1st European Team Chess Championship (women) in Debrecen (+2, =1, -5),
- In 1997, at first board in the 2nd European Team Chess Championship (women) in Pula (+6, =2, -1) and won individual silver medal.

In 1991, she was awarded the FIDE Woman International Master (WIM) title.
