= Marija Šibajeva =

Lithuanian chess player (born 2002)

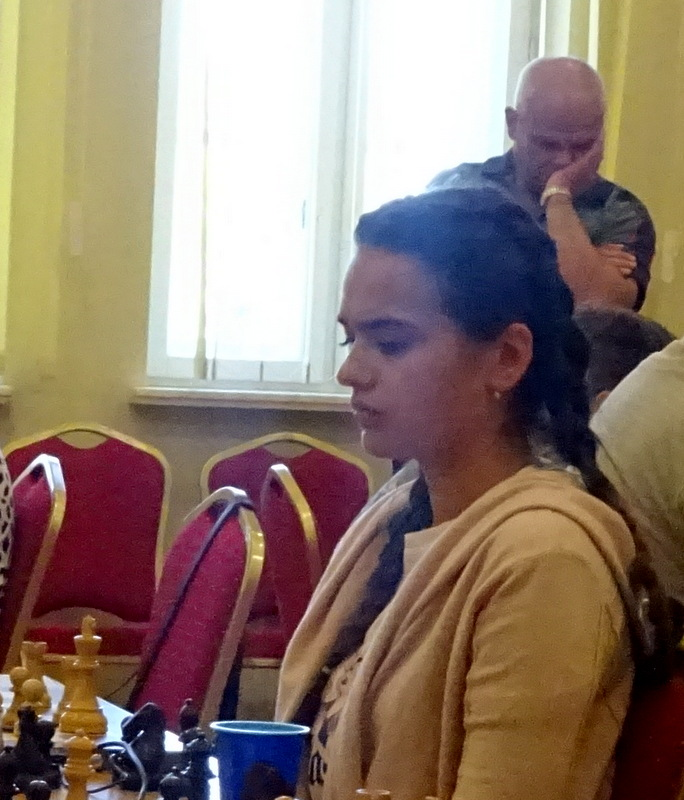
- Marija Šibajeva in 2019

Personal information
- Born: 10 April 2002 (age 24) Klaipėda, Lithuania

Chess career
- Country: Lithuania
- Title: Woman FIDE Master (2018)
- Peak rating: 2073 (December 2018)

Marija Šibajeva (born 10 April 2002) is a Lithuanian chess player who holds the title of Woman FIDE master (WGM, 2018). She is a Lithuanian Women's Chess Champion (2019).

== Chess career ==
Marija Šibajeva was graduate of Klaipeda Chess School. She is winner of multiple Lithuanian Youth Chess Championships in different age groups:

- in 2010 in U10 girls group,
- in 2013 in U14 girls group,
- in 2014 in U12 girls group,
- in 2015 in U12 girls group,
- in 2016 in U14 girls group,
- in 2018 in U16 girls group.

Marija Šibajeva repeatedly represented Lithuania at the European Youth Chess Championships and World Youth Chess Championships in different age groups, where in 2012 in Prague showing the best result in U10 girls age group when ranked 15th place.

Marija Šibajeva is multiple medalist of Klaipėda City Men's Chess Championship: in 2016 she won 2nd place but in 2018 and 2019 she won 3rd place.

In 2017, in Riga she participated in Women's European Individual Chess Championship.

In 2019, Marija Šibajeva won Lithuanian Women's Chess Championship.

In 2023, in Panevėžys she won bronze medal in Lithuanian Women's Chess Championship.

Marija Šibajeva played for Lithuania in the Women's Chess Olympiad:

- In 2018, at fourth board in the 43rd Chess Olympiad (women) in Batumi (+6, =0, -3).
