= Ilkka Sarén =

Finnish chess player (1940–2022)

Personal information
- Born: Ilkka Juhani Sarén; 16 May 1940 Helsinki, Finland
- Died: 24 December 2022 (aged 82)

Chess career
- Country: Finland
- Title: FIDE Master (1990)
- Peak rating: 2385 (July 1981)

Ilkka Juhani Sarén (16 May 1940 – 24 December 2022) was a Finnish chess FIDE master (FM), Finnish Chess Championship winner (1971).

== Biography ==
In the 1970s, Ilkka Sarén was one of Finland's leading chess players. In Finnish Chess Championships he has won gold (1971), and bronze (1978) medals. Sarén participated in World Junior Chess Championship (1959) and World Chess Championship Zonal tournament (1972).

Sarén played for Finland in the Chess Olympiads:

- In 1972, at third board in the 20th Chess Olympiad in Skopje (+5, =7, -3),
- In 1976, at first reserve board in the 22nd Chess Olympiad in Haifa (+5, =6, -1),
- In 1978, at fourth board in the 23rd Chess Olympiad in Buenos Aires (+2, =4, -3).

Sarén played for Finland in the European Team Chess Championship preliminaries:

- In 1973, at first board in the 5th European Team Chess Championship preliminaries (+0, =0, -5).

Sarén played for Finland in the Nordic Chess Cups:

- In 1971, at second board in the 2nd Nordic Chess Cup in Großenbrode (+0, =1, -4),
- In 1973, at first board in the 4th Nordic Chess Cup in Ribe (+0, =1, -4),
- In 1974, at third board in the 5th Nordic Chess Cup in Eckernförde (+1, =3, -1).
