= Sarabella Norlamo =

Finnish chess player (born 2003)

Personal information
- Born: 2003 (age 22–23)

Chess career
- Country: Finland
- Peak rating: 2023 (March 2020)

Sarabella Norlamo (born 2003) is a Finnish chess player and the 2021 Finnish Women's Chess Championship winner.

== Chess career ==
Sarabella Norlamo participated in Finnish and Estonian Youth Chess Tournaments, European Youth Chess Championships and World Youth Chess Championships in different age groups. She won five medals in Finnish Women's Chess Championships: gold (2021) and four bronze (2017, 2018, 2019, 2022). In 2017, in Riga she participated in Women's European Individual Chess Championship.

Sarabella Norlamo played for Finland in the Women's Chess Olympiads:

- In 2018, at fourth board in the 43rd Chess Olympiad (women) in Batumi (+3, =2, -4),
- In 2022, at reserve board in the 44th Chess Olympiad (women) in Chennai (+5, =1, -3).

Sarabella Norlamo played for Finland in the European Women's Team Chess Championship:

- In 2019, at fourth board in the 13th European Team Chess Championship (women) in Batumi (+3, =3, -2).
