= Sıla Çağlar =

Turkish chess player (born 2004)

- Çağlar at the 2026 Chess Olympiad

Personal information
- Born: 26 February 2004 (age 22)

Chess career
- Country: Turkey
- Title: Woman International Master (2020)
- Peak rating: 2306 (July 2019)

Sıla Çağlar (born 26 February 2004) is a Turkish Women International Master (WIM) (2020).

== Biography ==
In 2013, Sıla Çağlar won European School Chess Championship in the girls U09 age group. In 2016, she won Turkish Youth Chess Championship n the girls U12 age group. Sila Caglar repeatedly represented Turkey at the European Youth Chess Championships and World Youth Chess Championships in different age groups. In 2016, in Prague she won European Youth Chess Championship in the girls U12 age group and received Women FIDE Master (WFM) title. Sıla Çağlar two times played for Turkey team in the European Girls' U18 Team Chess Championships (2016-2017). Also she participated in European Individual Women Chess Championships (2017, 2018, 2019).

In 2020, she was awarded the FIDE Women International Master (WIM) title.
