= Agnese Līckrastiņa =

Latvian chess player (born 1972)

Personal information
- Born: 20 October 1972 (age 53)

Chess career
- Country: Latvia
- Title: Woman International Master (2001)
- Peak rating: 2268 (January 2002)

Agnese Līckrastiņa (née Sīpola, also Meijere and Meijere-Līckrastiņa; born 20 October 1972) is a Latvian chess Woman International Master (2001), Latvian Women's Chess Championships medalist (1996) and a Doctor of Engineering.

== Chess career ==
In the first half of the 1990s, she was one of the leading Latvian chess players. In 1992 at the Latvian Open Chess championship, she received the award as the best participant in the women's competition. In 1996, she won a silver medal at the Latvian Women's Chess Championship, defeating the winner of the tournament Anda Šafranska in a mutual game. In 1996, in Yerevan, she played for Latvian women's national team at the 32nd Women's Chess Olympiad. For her success in tournaments, FIDE (International Chess Federation) awarded her the title of Woman International Master (WIM) in 2001. Since the beginning of the 2000s, she has rarely participated in chess tournaments. In April 2017 in Riga she participated in a chess tournament after a 15-year break and ranked in 123rd place in Women's European Individual Chess Championship.

== Scientist ==
In 2005, she became a doctor of engineering (Dr.sc.ing.). Since 2007, she has been working at Riga Technical University as an associate professor, where she has authored 15 scientific works.

== Family ==
She was married to Grandmaster Viesturs Meijers.

== Literature ==
- Encyclopedia of Latvian chessplayers : 1900-2000 / compiled by Val Zemitis; editors, J. Vitomskis ... [et al. ]. [ASV : b. n.], 2009 Vol 2. : il., portr.; 29 cm.
