= Leena Laitinen =

Finnish chess player

Personal information
- Born: 1957 (age 68–69)

Chess career
- Country: Finland

Leena Laitinen (born 1957) is a Finnish chess player, three-times Finnish Women Chess Championship winner (1982, 1983, 1984).

== Biography ==
In the 1970s and 1980s, Leena Laitinen was one of Finland's leading chess players. In Finnish Chess Championships she has won three gold (1982, 1983, 1984) and two silver (1978, 1980) medals. In 1978, in Kikinda Leena Laitinen participated in 2nd European Girls' Junior Chess Championship and ranked 11th.

Leena Laitinen played for Finland in the Women's Chess Olympiads:

- In 1976, at first reserve board in the 7th Chess Olympiad (women) in Haifa (+2, =2, -2),
- In 1980, at third board in the 9th Chess Olympiad (women) in Valletta (+3, =2, -5),
- In 1982, at second board in the 10th Chess Olympiad (women) in Lucerne (+2, =3, -6),
- In 1984, at first board in the 26th Chess Olympiad (women) in Thessaloniki (+2, =3, -4).

Leena Laitinen played for Finland in the Nordic Chess Cup:

- In 1983, at fifth board in the 9th Nordic Chess Cup in Oslo (+1, =1, -5).
