= Narmin Mammadova =

Azerbaijani chess player (born 1999)

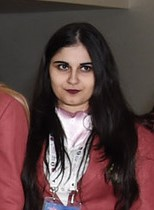
- Narmin Mammadova in 2016

Personal information
- Born: 24 June 1999 (age 27) Baku, Azerbaijan

Chess career
- Country: Azerbaijan
- Title: Woman Grandmaster (2024)
- Peak rating: 2332 (May 2019)

Narmin Mammadova (Azerbaijani: Nərmin Məmmədova; born 24 June 1999) is an Azerbaijani Woman Grandmaster (2024).

== Biography ==
Narmin Mammadova is multiple winner of the Azerbaijani Youth Chess Championships: she won in the girls' U14 age group in 2012, a year later she was third in the same age group. In 2015, she was second in the girls' U18 age group.

Narmin Mammadova has represented Azerbaijan several times at the European and World Youth Chess Championships. In 2012, she won a silver medal in the girls' U13 age group at the World School Individual Chess Championship. In 2013, she won a silver medal in the girls' U15 age group at the European School Individual Chess Championship, in 2014, she was third in the girls' U15 age group at the European School Individual Chess Championship.

In 2014, she won the Baku Women's Chess Championship.

In 2017, she tied for 3rd-6th place in the Azerbaijani Women's Chess Championship. A year later, she tied for 4th-6th place in the same tournament.

Narmin Mammadova is multiple participant in the European Individual Women's Chess Championship, including the 2017 Women's European Individual Chess Championship in Riga.

In 2024, she won 2nd place in the women's tournament at the Abu Dhabi International Chess Festival.

Narmin Mammadova represented the third team of Azerbaijan at the 42nd Chess Olympiad in Baku, where she won 7 points out of 11 possible at the 1st board.

In 2016, she was awarded the FIDE Women International Master (WIM) title and received the FIDE Women Grandmaster (WGM) title eight years later.
