= Jalo Aatos Fred =

Finnish chess player

Personal information
- Born: 11 April 1917 Pori, Finland
- Died: 10 April 2003 (aged 85)

Chess career
- Country: Finland

Jalo Aatos Fred (11 April 1917 – 10 April 2003) was a Finnish chess player, two-time Finnish Chess Championship winner (1947, 1955) and Chess Olympiad individual bronze medal winner (1964).

== Biography ==
From the late 1940s to the early 1960s, Fred was one of Finland's leading chess players. In Finnish Chess Championships he has won two gold (1947, 1955), silver (1961) and three bronze (1951, 1953, 1960) medals.

Fred played for Finland in the Chess Olympiads:

- In 1952, at reserve board in the 10th Chess Olympiad in Helsinki (+2, =5, -3),
- In 1954, at fourth reserve board in the 11th Chess Olympiad in Amsterdam (+2, =11, -3),
- In 1956, at fourth board in the 12th Chess Olympiad in Moscow (+4, =6, -5),
- In 1958, at fourth board in the 13th Chess Olympiad in Munich (+2, =8, -4),
- In 1960, at reserve board in the 14th Chess Olympiad in Leipzig (+3, =7, -4),
- In 1962, at second reserve board in the 15th Chess Olympiad in Varna (+3, =4, -2),
- In 1964, at third board in the 16th Chess Olympiad in Tel Aviv (+8, =6, -2) and won individual bronze medal.
