= Mauri Olavi Sirkiä =

Finnish chess player

Personal information
- Born: 18 July 1947 (age 78) Kaarina, Finland

Chess career
- Country: Finland
- Title: FIDE Master (1990)
- Peak rating: 2350 (July 1971)

Mauri Olavi Sirkiä (born 18 July 1947, Kaarina) is a Finnish chess FIDE master (FM), Finnish Chess Championship winner (1969).

== Biography ==
In the 1960s and 1970s, Mauri Olavi Sirkiä was one of Finland's leading chess players. In Finnish Chess Championships he has won gold medal in 1969.

Mauri Olavi Sirkiä played for Finland in the Chess Olympiad:

- In 1970, at third board in the 19th Chess Olympiad in Siegen (+7, =8, -3).

Mauri Olavi Sirkiä played for Finland in the World Student Team Chess Championships:

- In 1966, at second reserve board in the 13th World Student Team Chess Championship in Örebro (+0, =1, -5),
- In 1968, at second board in the 15th World Student Team Chess Championship in Ybbs (+3, =2, -5),
- In 1969, at second board in the 16th World Student Team Chess Championship in Dresden (+6, =5, -0),
- In 1970, at first board in the 17th World Student Team Chess Championship in Haifa (+3, =1, -3).
