= Mikael Agopov =

Finnish chess player (born 1978)

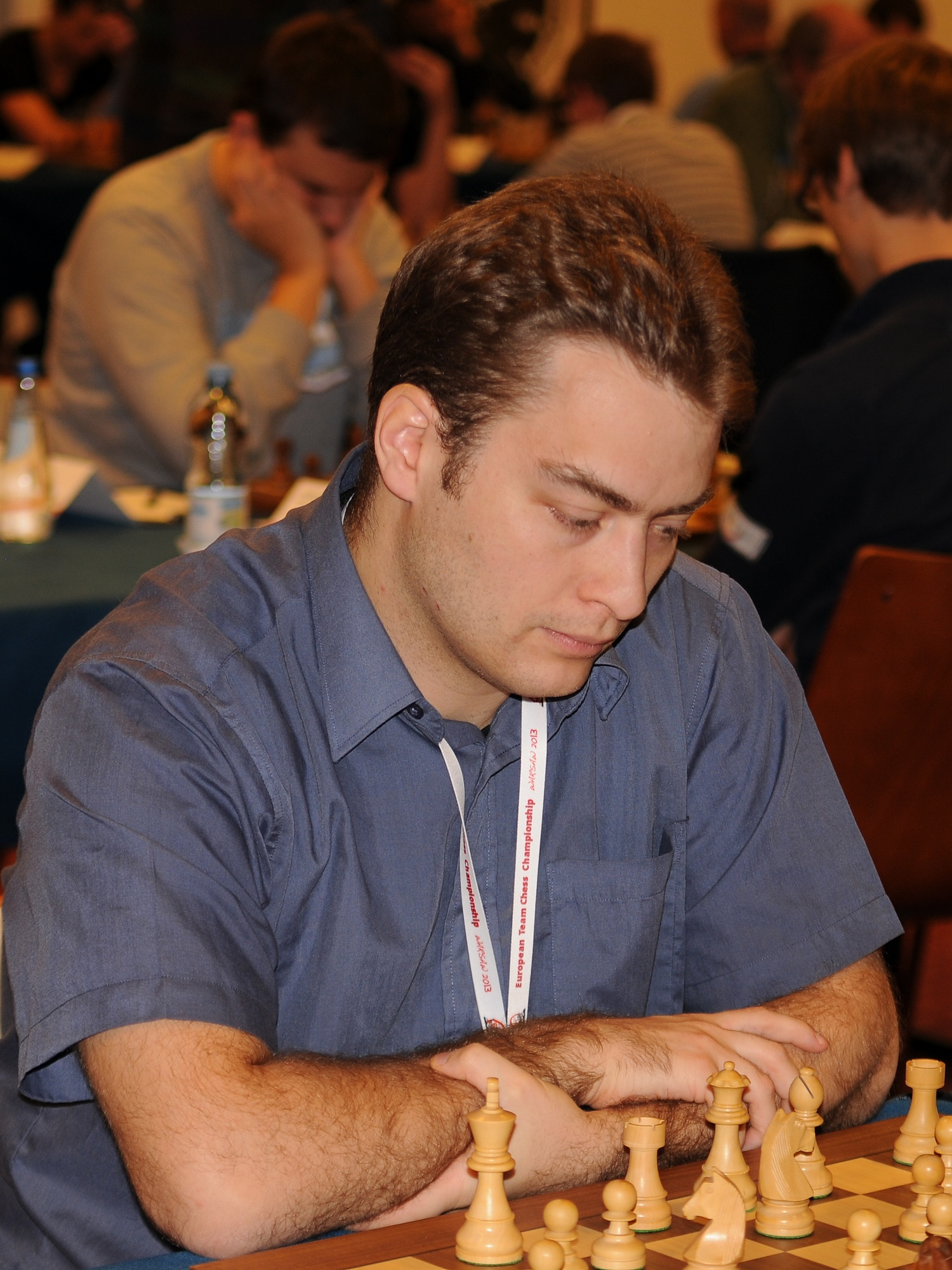
- Agopov in 2013

Personal information
- Born: 5 March 1978 (age 48)

Chess career
- Country: Finland
- Title: International Master (1999)
- Peak rating: 2465 (June 2015)

Mikael Agopov (born 5 March 1978) is a Finnish chess player. He was awarded the title of International master in 1999. His highest Elo rating was 2465 (in June 2015) and as of July 2021, he is ranked Finland's 5th best active player.

He has won the Finnish Chess Championship three times; in 2011, 2015, and 2018.

In 2013, he shared the lead with Uladzislaŭ Kavaljoŭ in an international tournament in Viljandi dedicated to the 100th anniversary of Ilmar Raud.
