= Michele Riello =

Italian chess player (1894–1971)

Personal information
- Born: 4 October 1894 Voltri, Italy
- Died: 13 June 1971 (aged 76)

Chess career
- Country: Italy

Michele Riello (4 October 1894 – 13 June 1971) was an Italian chess master, Italian Chess Championship bronze medalist (1936).

== Biography ==
In 1927, Michele Riello ranking third in the interregional chess tournament in Venice and fourth in chess tournament in Naples and was awarded the title of National Chess Master. He participated in several Italian Chess Championships: Milan (1931), Milan (1934), Florence (1935), Florence (1936 – where he was 3rd behind Vincenzo Castaldi and Mario Monticelli), Naples (1937), Rome (1939), Rome (1947), Florence (1948). Michele Riello also played in the chess tournaments of Milan (1937, 1938), Reggio Emilia (1947 – 3rd place behind Esteban Canal and Massimo Romi), Venice (1948 – 5th place, 1950), Savona (1956 – 2nd place), Imperia (1962 – 4th place with Andrzej Filipowicz).

Michele Riello played for Italy in the Chess Olympiad:

- In 1937, at second board in the 7th Chess Olympiad in Stockholm (+1, =3, -12).
