= Peter Reid (chess player) =

Scottish chess player

Personal information
- Born: 26 November 1910 Orpington, England
- Died: 16 August 1939 (aged 28) Isle of Skye, Scotland

Chess career
- Country: United Kingdom

Peter Reid (26 November 1910 – 16 August 1939) was a Scottish chess player and mountain climber.

== Biography ==
Peter Reid was born in Orpington, Kent, the son of a solicitor who later worked in Georgetown, British Guiana. He was educated at Stowe before going on to study mathematics at St Catharine's College, Cambridge, where he obtained a half-blue for chess (playing two Varsity matches, scoring a win and a draw) and was secretary of the Cambridge University Chess Club.

After graduation, he lived in Edinburgh. A year before his death, Reid returned to London. He worked as an insurance agent for the Standard Life Assurance Company. Preparing to becoming an actuary, he passed the entrance exam at the Institute of Actuaries in London.

Reid was one of the strongest Scottish chess players in the 1930s, playing for Scotland in the Chess Olympiad:

- In 1937, at fourth board in the 7th Chess Olympiad in Stockholm (+3, =3, -11).

The Sunday Times reported that he played "some admirable games on that occasion".

Peter Reid was also an experienced mountain climber. He died while climbing Mount An-Cioch, located in an array of Coolin Hills on the Isle of Skye in the Inner Hebrides archipelago. While climbing the steep slope, Reid, who was the first to go, fell from a height of 70 feet and landed on a small platform. Rescuers who arrived at the scene of the accident found him already dead.
