= Pirkko Irmeli Ekström =

Finnish chess player

Personal information
- Born: 16 November 1945
- Died: 17 August 2011 (aged 65)

Chess career
- Country: Finland

Pirkko Irmeli Ekström (née Pihlajamäki; 16 November 1945 – 17 August 2011) was a Finnish chess player and a Finnish Women Chess Championship medalist (1976, 1982, 1984).

== Biography ==
From the mid-1970s to the mid-1980s, Pirkko Irmeli Ekström was one of Finland's leading chess players. In Finnish Chess Championships she has won silver (1982) and two bronze (1976, 1984) medals. In 1985, in Eksjö Pirkko Irmeli Ekström participated in Women's World Chess Championship Zonal tournament.

Pirkko Irmeli Ekström played for Finland in the Women's Chess Olympiads:

- In 1976, at second board in the 7th Chess Olympiad (women) in Haifa (+1, =3, -5),
- In 1978, at third board in the 8th Chess Olympiad (women) in Buenos Aires (+4, =4, -3),
- In 1980, at first reserve board in the 9th Chess Olympiad (women) in Valletta (+2, =4, -4),
- In 1982, at third board in the 10th Chess Olympiad (women) in Lucerne (+5, =2, -3),
- In 1984, at first reserve board in the 26th Chess Olympiad (women) in Thessaloniki (+5, =4, -2).
