= Toivo Salo =

Finnish chess player

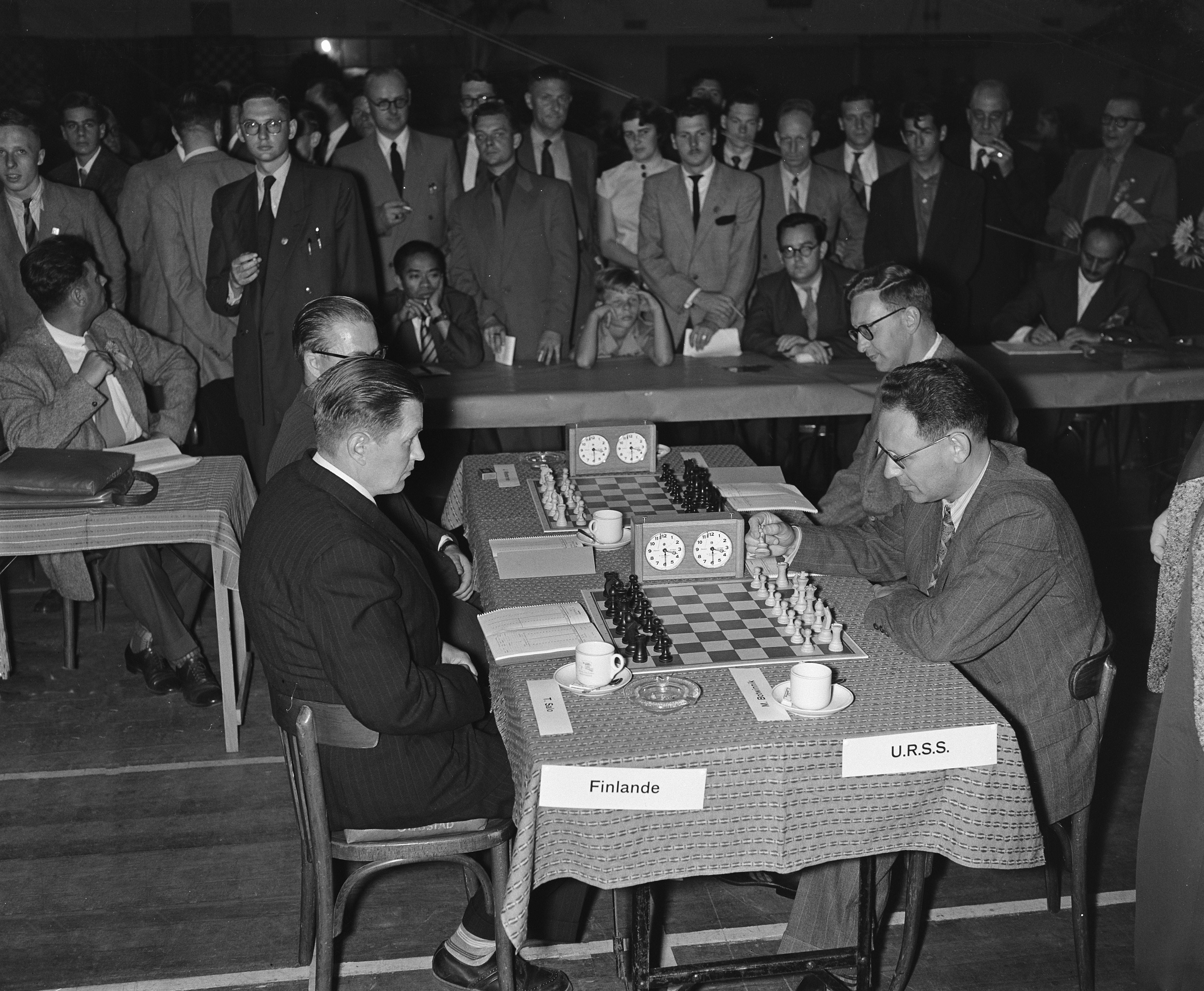
- Salo (front left) vs. Mikhail Botvinnik (1954)

Personal information
- Born: 22 January 1909 Helsinki, Finland
- Died: 5 April 1981 (aged 72) Helsinki, Finland

Chess career
- Country: Finland

Toivo Salo (22 January 1909 – 5 April 1981) was a Finnish chess player, three-time Finnish Chess Championship winner (1938, 1949, 1956).

== Biography ==
From the late 1930s to the early 1960s, Toivo Salo was one of Finland's leading chess players. In Finnish Chess Championships he has won three gold (1938, 1949, 1956), five silver (1936, 1937, 1950, 1953, 1957) and bronze (1952) medals.

Toivo Salo played for Finland in the Chess Olympiads:

- In 1935, at reserve board in the 6th Chess Olympiad in Warsaw (+1, =3, -3),
- In 1937, at fourth reserve board in the 7th Chess Olympiad in Stockholm (+4, =5, -5),
- In 1952, at fourth board in the 10th Chess Olympiad in Helsinki (+2, =3, -4),
- In 1954, at first board in the 11th Chess Olympiad in Amsterdam (+1, =3, -7),
- In 1956, at second board in the 12th Chess Olympiad in Moscow (+2, =4, -8).

Toivo Salo played for Finland in the unofficial Chess Olympiad:

- In 1936, at fourth board in the 3rd unofficial Chess Olympiad in Munich (+5, =7, -5).

Toivo Salo played for Finland in the European Team Chess Championship preliminaries:

In 1961, at second board (+1, =2, -1).

== Career ==
In total his win streak out of 81 games he won 23.5% that was 19 wins his draws out of 81 games was also 19, that was 23.5% and his losing percent was 58.3% that is 43 losses. he his win percentage on black was higher by 7% than white. he played a total of 81 games. He was a father he had one daughter and a son.
