= Marjatta Kujasalo =

Finnish chess player

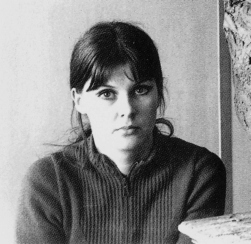
- Marjatta Kujasalo in 1968

Personal information
- Born: 12 September 1943 (age 82) Brașov, Romania

Chess career
- Country: Finland

Aune Marjatta Kujasalo (née Palasto, born 12 September 1943) is a Finnish sculptor and chess player, two-times Finnish Women Chess Championship winner (1978, 1980).

== Biography ==
Palasto, who is the daughter of diplomats Soini Palasto and Taina Arhonmaa, studied 1963–1967 at the School of Art and Design (ceramics) and 1967–1868 at the École nationale supérieure des Beaux-Arts in Paris with César Baldaccini as teacher. She first exhibited in 1970 and is known for her experimental sculptures and reliefs, both figurative and abstract, in wood, fabric, paper and steel, among other things. However, she began with sculptures, which were classically cast in bronze, including portraits of the authors Eeva Kilpi, Anu Kaipainen and Pentti Saaritsa.

Palasto has studied the significance of shadows in his sculptures and reliefs. Her monochrome reliefs give the impression of neoplastic, architectural visions, which, however, are pure compositions with light and shadows. Humor and playfulness have also been included as elements in her work. She has taught at the Art Industrial Vocational School 1968–1969, the Art High School in Savonlinna 1970–1973, the Art School in Lahti 1984–1988 and the Nordic Art School in Kokkola in 1985.

She is married to the painter Matti Kujasalo.

== Chess career ==
From the begin of 1970s to the end of 1980s, Marjatta Kujasalo was one of Finland's leading chess players. In Finnish Chess Championships she has won two gold (1978, 1980), four silver (1973, 1974, 1975, 1981) and bronze (1971) medals. In 1978, in Tel Aviv Marjatta Kujasalo participated in World Women's Chess Championship West European Zonal tournament.

Marjatta Kujasalo played for Finland in the Women's Chess Olympiads:

- In 1972, at first reserve board in the 5th Chess Olympiad (women) in Skopje (+1, =0, -3),
- In 1974, at first reserve board in the 6th Chess Olympiad (women) in Medellín (+0, =2, -4),
- In 1978, at second board in the 8th Chess Olympiad (women) in Buenos Aires (+3, =2, -5),
- In 1980, at second board in the 9th Chess Olympiad (women) in Valletta (+4, =1, -6),
- In 1984, at second board in the 26th Chess Olympiad (women) in Thessaloniki (+3, =1, -6),
- In 2012, at reserve board in the 40th Chess Olympiad (women) in Istanbul (+2, =2, -5),
- In 2014, at reserve board in the 41st Chess Olympiad (women) in Tromsø (+3, =0, -4).

Marjatta Kujasalo played for Finland in the European Women's Team Chess Championships:

- In 2015, at fourth board in the 11th European Team Chess Championship (women) in Reykjavík (+0, =0, -9).
