= Storm Herseth =

Norwegian chess player

Personal information
- Born: 4 September 1897 Fredrikstad
- Died: 24 August 1985 (aged 87)

Chess career
- Country: Norway

Storm Herseth (4 September 1897 – 24 August 1985) was a Norwegian chess player.

== Biography ==
In 1920, Storm Herseth firstly attracted attention by defeating chess grandmaster Richard Réti in Simultaneous exhibition. He has been the strongest player in the Oslo Chess Club Oslo Schackselskab. In the 1930s Storm Herseth was one of the leading Norwegian chess players. He won medals in Norwegian Chess Championships.

Storm Herseth played for Norway in the Chess Olympiads:

- In 1937, at first board in the 7th Chess Olympiad in Stockholm (+0, =5, -9).

Storm Herseth played for Norway in the unofficial Chess Olympiad:

- In 1936, at third board in the 3rd unofficial Chess Olympiad in Munich (+5, =6, -6).

Storm Herseth was doctor by profession.
