= Øjvind Larsen =

Danish chess player

Personal information
- Born: 23 June 1882
- Died: 6 July 1960 (aged 78) Maribo, Denmark

Chess career
- Country: Denmark

Øjvind Larsen (23 June 1882 – 6 July 1960) was a Danish chess player, Danish Chess Championship silver medalist (1926).

In the 1920s and 1930s Larsen was one of the leading Danish chess players. Larsen took part in the Danish Chess Championships from 1923 to 1947. He achieved his best result in 1926, sharing 1st–3rd places. After an additional tournament for the champions title, he placed 2nd (Erik Andersen won).

Larsen played for Denmark in three Chess Olympiads:

- In 1931, at reserve board in the 4th Chess Olympiad in Prague (+2, =1, −8),
- In 1937, at fourth board in the 7th Chess Olympiad in Stockholm (+2, =5, −3),
- In 1939, at reserve board in the 8th Chess Olympiad in Buenos Aires (+1, =1, −2).

Larsen died on 6 July 1960 in Maribo, Denmark.
