= Pertti Poutiainen =

Finnish chess player (1952–1978)

Personal information
- Born: 5 December 1952 Helsinki, Finland
- Died: 11 June 1978 (aged 25) Helsinki, Finland

Chess career
- Country: Finland
- Title: International Master (1976)
- Peak rating: 2430 (January 1977)

Pertti Kalervo Poutiainen (5 December 1952 — 11 June 1978) was a Finnish chess International Master (IM) (1976), two-times Finnish Chess Championship winner (1974, 1976).

== Biography ==
In the 1970s Pertti Poutiainen was one of the top Finnish chess players. He has twice won gold medals at the Finnish Chess Championships (1974, 1976). In 1975, Pertti Poutiainen participated in FIDE Zonal tournament for World Chess Championship. In 1976 he was awarded the title of International Master (IM).

Pertti Poutiainen played for Finland in the Chess Olympiad:

- In 1974, at second board in the 21st Chess Olympiad in Nice (+6, =5, -7).

Pertti Poutiainen played for Finland in the World Student Team Chess Championship:

- In 1974, at first board in the 20th World Student Team Chess Championship in Teesside (+5, =4, -4).

Pertti Poutiainen played for Finland in the Nordic Chess Cups:

- In 1973, at second board in the 4th Nordic Chess Cup in Ribe (+2, =0, -3),
- In 1974, at first board in the 5th Nordic Chess Cup in Eckernförde (+2, =2, -1),
- In 1975, at first board in the 6th Nordic Chess Cup in Hindås (+2, =1, -2) and won team bronze medal.

Serious dysfunction and the pursuit of game perfection eventually led to his suicide in 1978.
