= Thorsten Gauffin =

Finnish chess player (1901–1970)

Personal information
- Born: 2 June 1901 Turku, Finland
- Died: 28 November 1970 (aged 69) Turku, Finland

Chess career
- Country: Finland

Thorsten Gauffin (2 June 1901 – 28 November 1970) was a Finnish chess player, Finnish Chess Championship winner (1937).

== Biography ==
In the 1930s, Thorsten Gauffin was one of the Finland's leading chess players. In 1937, in Helsinki, he won the Finnish Chess Championship. He was best known for his victories at the 1937 Chess Olympiad over the reigning World Chess Champion Max Euwe and grandmaster Paul Keres.

Thorsten Gauffin played for Finland in the Chess Olympiads:

- In 1930, at fourth board in the 3rd Chess Olympiad in Hamburg (+3, =1, -10),
- In 1937, at first board in the 7th Chess Olympiad in Stockholm (+2, =4, -8).

He died of natural causes on 28 November, 1970 (aged 69) at Turku, Finland.
