= Mika Karttunen =

Finnish chess player

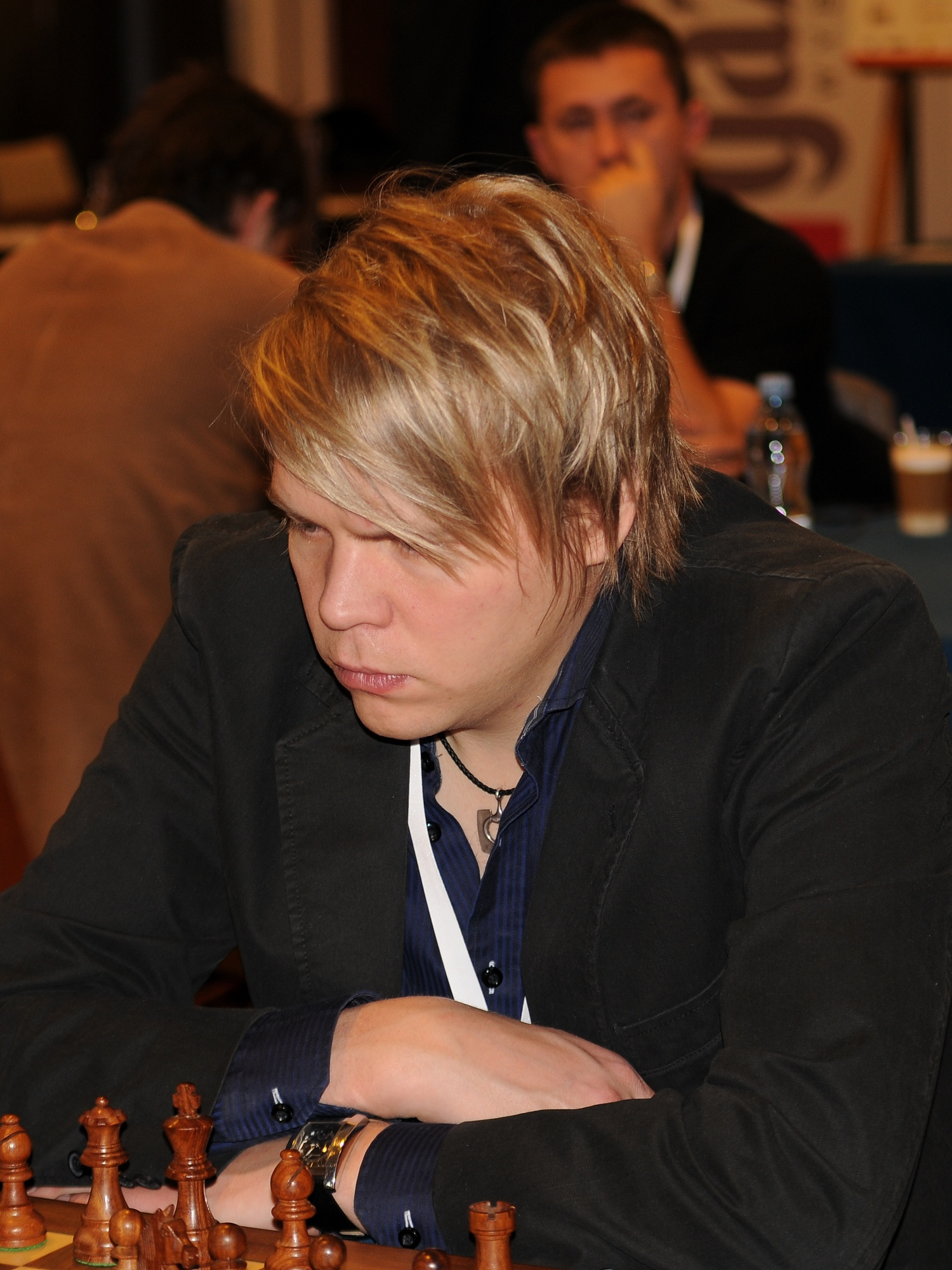
- Karttunen in 2013

Personal information
- Born: 30 May 1981 (age 45)

Chess career
- Country: Finland
- Title: International Master (2001)
- FIDE rating: 2497 (July 2026)
- Peak rating: 2497 (October 2023)

Mika Karttunen (born 30 May 1981) is a Finnish chess player, International Master.

== Chess career ==
He won the Finnish Championship in 2002, 2006, 2007, 2009, 2010, 2013 and 2014. Played for Finland in the Chess Olympiads of 2000, 2002, 2004, 2006, 2008, 2010 and 2012. He won individual silver medal on second board at European Chess Club Championship in Saint-Vincent, Italy (2005).

In January 2012 FIDE list, he has an Elo rating of 2441, making him Finland's number four.

== Notable games ==
- Mika Karttunen vs Malcolm Armstrong, EU Union Championships 2006, Trompowsky Attack (A45), 1-0
- Mika Karttunen vs Sergei Movsesian, EU Clubs Cup (Men) 2003, Trompowsky Attack (A45), 1/2-1/2
- Stuart Conquest vs Mika Karttunen, EU Union Championships 2006, Modern Defense, Bronstein Variation (E94), 0-1
