= Denis Marion =

Belgian journalist

Marcel Defosse (15 April 1906 – 15 August 2000) was a Belgian journalist who used the name Denis Marion.

Defosse played for Belgium in the 1937 Chess Olympiad.
