= Adolphe-Édouard Défossé =

French politician

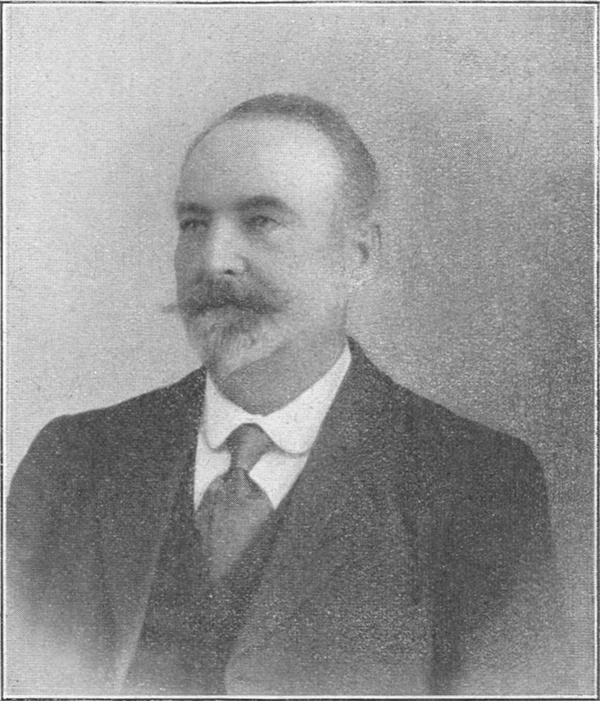
- Born: 20 January 1855; Bourghelles, Nord, France
- Died: 15 March 1922 (aged 67); Paris, France
- Occupation: Politician

Adolphe-Édouard Défossé (20 January 1855 – 15 March 1922) was a French politician. He served as a member of the Chamber of Deputies from 1914 to 1919, representing Nord.
