= Aulikki Ristoja =

Finnish chess player (born 1949)

Personal information
- Born: 2 January 1949 (age 77)

Chess career
- Country: Finland
- Title: Lady International Master (1998)
- Peak rating: 1744 (March 2024)

Aulikki Ristoja (also Ristoja-Lehtimäki, born 2 January 1949) is a Finnish chess player who holds the title of Lady International Correspondence Chess Master (LIMC, 1998). She is a three-time winner the Finnish Women Chess Championship (1979, 1988, 2000).

== Chess career ==
In Finnish Chess Championships for women she has won 3 gold (1979, 1988, 2000), 5 silver (1976, 1981 (shared), 1983, 1987, 1997 (shared)) and 4 bronze (1978, 1980, 1985, 1999) medals.

Aulikki Ristoja played for Finland in the Women's Chess Olympiads:

- In 1976, at third board in the 7th Chess Olympiad (women) in Haifa (+5, =2, -3).
- In 1978, at first reserve board in the 8th Chess Olympiad (women) in Buenos Aires (+5, =0, -5).
- In 1982, at first reserve board in the 10th Chess Olympiad (women) in Lucerne (+7, =1, -3).
- In 1988, at first board in the 28th Chess Olympiad (women) in Thessaloniki (+2, =1, -8).
- In 2000, at first reserve board in the 34th Chess Olympiad (women) in Istanbul (+2, =1, -5).

Aulikki Ristoja is the first Finnish correspondence chess player who holds the title of Lady International Correspondence Chess Master (LIM, 1998). She was also the first Finnish chess player who participated in ICCF Ladies World Championship and placed 11th in the VI final tournament.

== Books ==
- Ristoja, Aulikki; Ristoja, Thomas (1995). Perusteet. Shakki (in Finnish). ISBN 951-0-20505-2.
