= Matti Poutiainen =

Finnish politician

Matts (Matti) Poutiainen (7 March 1864 in Sortavalan maalaiskunta – 5 June 1929) was a Finnish farmer and politician. He was a member of the Parliament of Finland from 1908 to 1916, representing the Agrarian League.
