= Soini Palasto =

Finnish diplomat and ambassador

Soini Otso Olavi Palasto, last name until 1934 Planström (17 June 1912, in Viipuri – 28 March 2002, in Helsinki) was a Finnish diplomat and Ambassador.

Palasto was born in Viipuri to family of merchant Karl Gustaf Planström and Aino Alina Sandström. He graduated in 1930, completed a general law degree in 1937 and graduated as a Bachelor of Law.

Palasto served as Secretary of the Ministry for Foreign Affairs from 1942 to 1943, as Secretary of State in Bucharest from 1943 to 1945 and at the Ministry of Foreign Affairs from 1946 to 1948, and served as Secretary of State in Prague and Vienna from 1949 to 1950 and also in Budapest in 1950 and in The Hague from 1950 to 1953.

He served as Division Officer for the Political Department of the Ministry of Foreign Affairs from 1953 to 1955, Deputy Director General from 1955 to 1958, as Consultative Officer from 1958 to 1959 and Head of the Legal Department from 1959 to 1961.

Palasto was Ambassador to Buenos Aires from 1961 to 1966, while serving as Ambassador to Santiago, Montevideo and Asunción and then to Ambassador to Cairo, Beirut, Damascus, Khartoum and Amman from 1966 to 1969.

After the non-active status from 1969 to 1972, Palasto then served as Ambassador to Sofia in 1972–1979. Palasto received the title of Consul General in 1958.

Soini Palasto was married in 1939–1972 with Master of Philosophy Taina Arhonmaa (died in 1972). Their daughter was artist Marjatta Palasto.
