= Heikki Westerinen =

Finnish chess grandmaster (born 1944)

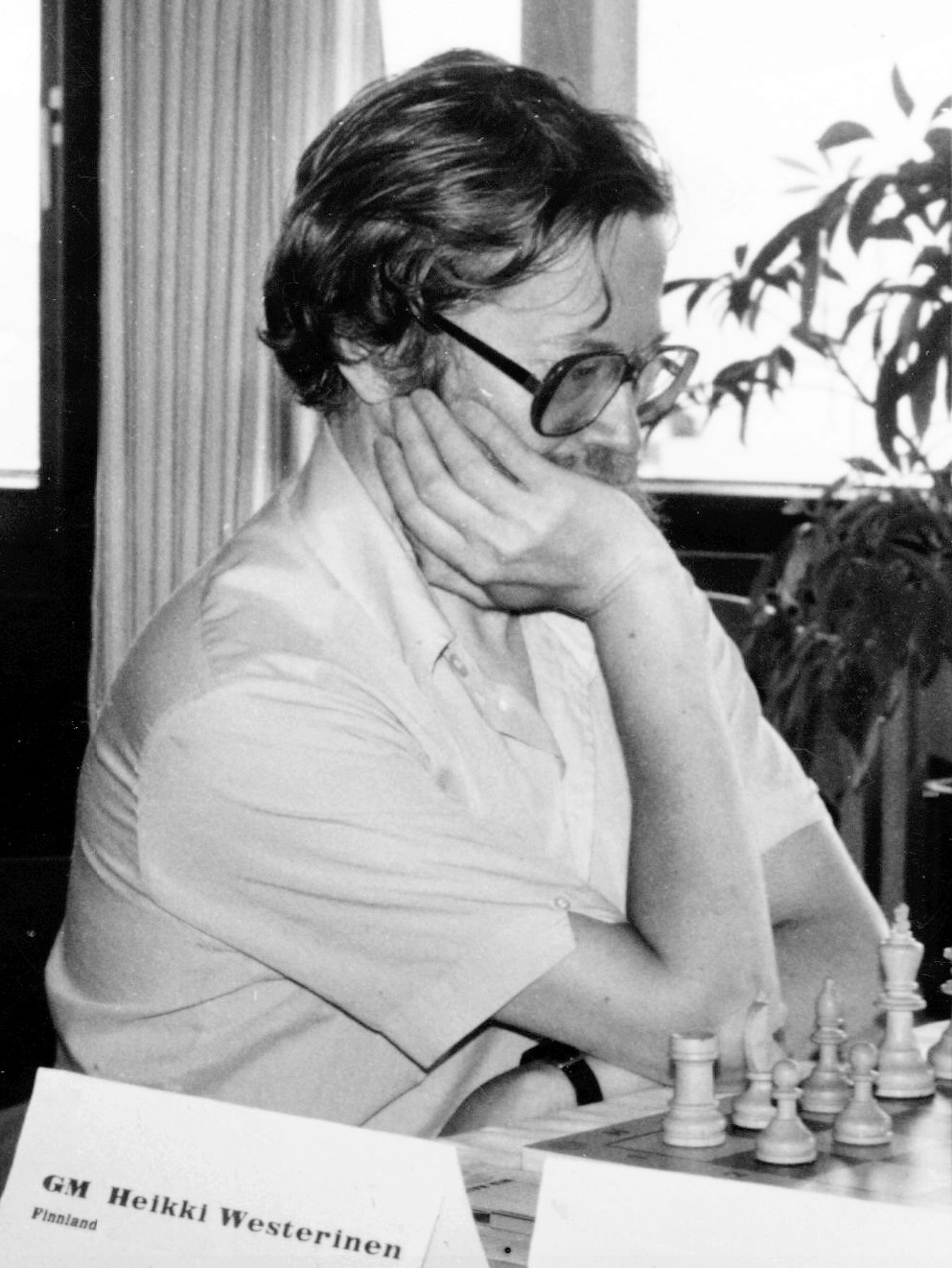
- Westerinen in Altensteig, 1987

Personal information
- Born: Heikki Markku Julius Westerinen; 27 April 1944 (age 82) Helsinki, Finland

Chess career
- Country: Finland
- Title: Grandmaster (1975)
- Peak rating: 2485 (January 1976)

Heikki Markku Julius Westerinen (born 27 April 1944) is a Finnish chess player, born in Helsinki. He became a national master at age sixteen, and earned the FIDE titles of International Master in 1967 and Grandmaster in 1975 making him the first Finnish player to obtain chess Grandmaster title. Westerinen won the Finnish Championship in 1965, 1966, 1968, and 1970. He played for the national team in the biennial Chess Olympiads from 1962 through 1996, and 2006. Westerinen's best tournament results include third place at Berlin 1971, tie for second place at Oslo 1973, first at Sant Feliu de Guixols 1973, and first at Dortmund 1973 and 1975. His style is described as original and combinative.
