= Eero Böök =

Finnish chess player

Personal information
- Full name: Eero Einar Böök
- Born: 9 February 1910 Helsinki, Finland
- Died: 7 January 1990 (aged 79) Helsinki, Finland

Chess career
- Country: Finland
- Title: International Master (1950); Honorary Grandmaster (1984)

Eero Einar Böök (9 February 1910 – 7 January 1990) was a Finnish chess player and engineer.

== Chess career ==
A five-time Finnish champion who represented his country six times in the Chess Olympiad, Böök was awarded the International Master title in 1950 and became an honorary Grandmaster in 1984. His only significant international tournament victory was a tie for first place with Gösta Stoltz in the 1947 Nordic Championship in Helsinki. Perhaps his best tournament finish was sharing eleventh place in the category 14 interzonal, Saltsjöbaden 1948.

Böök played many of the world's top players, and had a plus record against Miguel Najdorf (+1 −0 =2). He beat Max Euwe with the black pieces in Dubrovnik in 1950, as well as the Estonian chess player Paul Keres in the 1952 Helsinki Olympiad.

Böök also wrote several chess books.

== Sample game ==
Euwe vs. Böök, Dubrovnik 1950

Position: g1 white king, f1 white knight, c1 white bishop, h2 white pawn, g3 white pawn, f3 white rook, c3 black bishop, b3 black bishop, f4 white pawn, e4 white bishop, b4 black pawn, a4 black pawn, e5 white pawn, g6 black pawn, h7 black pawn, f7 black knight, g8 black king, d8 black rook

Final position

Euwe–Böök, Dubrovnik 1950:
1.Nf3 Nf6 2.g3 g6 3.Bg2 Bg7 4.c4 0-0 5.0-0 d5 6.d4 e6 7.b3 b6 8.Ba3 Re8 9.Nbd2 Bb7 10.Rc1 Nbd7 11.Re1 Ne4 12.Qc2 Rc8 13.Rcd1 f5 14.Bb2 Qe7 15.Ne5 Nxe5 16.dxe5 Red8 17.Nb1 dxc4 18.Qxc4 c5 19.f3 Ng5 20.Na3 a6 21.Qh4 b5 22.Rd6 Bf8 23.Bc1 Nf7 24.Qxe7 Bxe7 25.Rxe6 Rc7 26.f4 Bc8 27.Rb6 c4 28.Rb8 Bc5+ 29.e3 Bb4 30.Rf1 cxb3 31.axb3 Be6 32.Rb6 Bc8 33.Rc6 Rxc6 34.Bxc6 Be6 35.Nc2 Bc3 36.e4 Bxb3 37.Ne3 fxe4 38.Bxe4 a5 39.Rf3 b4 40.Nf1 a4 0–1

== Private life and non-chess career ==
His father Emil Einar Böök was Finland's Minister of Social Affairs in 1924. Eero Böök graduated from the Helsinki University of Technology in 1940 and worked as an engineer for the ports of Helsinki, Turku and Kotka and for the Finnish State Railways until retiring in 1975.
