= Shane Matthews (chess player) =

Jamaican chess player (born 1964)

Personal information
- Born: October 18, 1964 (age 62)

Chess career
- Country: Jamaica
- Title: International Master (2018)
- Peak rating: 2271 (January 1999)

Shane Matthews (born October 18, 1964) is a Jamaican chess player. He is a seven-time Jamaican Chess Champion and one of two International Masters in Jamaica, alongside Jomo Pitterson.

== Chess career ==
Matthews began playing chess at the age of 9. He played his first tournament in 1981, placing second in the first qualifier of the National Junior Championships. He is known in chess circles as "The Magician".

He was a leading Jamaican player in the 1980s, and has won the Jamaican Chess Championship seven times, in: 1984, 1986, 1987, 1989, 1997, 2002, 2003. He has the second-most national championship wins, only behind Warren Elliott.

In January 2011, he was awarded the FIDE Master title, which he first achieved in the 1998 Chess Olympiad. This made him the first Jamaican to chronologically earn an international title (though due to technical errors that were resolved later in 2010, it made him the fourth player to officially be awarded an international title).

In April 2019, he won the Barita Chess Open with an undefeated score of 5.5/6. He defeated defending champion Shreyas Smith and sealed his victory by drawing against Ryan Blackwood in the final round.
