= Konstanty Kaiszauri =

Swedish chess player (born 1952)

Personal information
- Born: 25 October 1952 (age 73) Tbilisi, Georgia

Chess career
- Country: Sweden
- Title: International Master (1977)
- Peak rating: 2410 (January 1978)

Konstanty Kaiszauri (Georgian: კოტე კაიშაური; born 25 October 1952) is a Swedish chess International Master (IM) (1977).

== Biography ==
Konstanty Kaiszauri was born in Poland. His family have Georgian origin. At the end of the 1960s, Konstanty Kaiszauri was one of the leading Polish juniors. In 1968 he won the bronze medal of the Polish Junior Chess Championship (U20) in Nowa Huta. He twice won the medals of the Polish team championships with Legion Warsaw: gold (Wrocław 1969) and silver (Poznań 1968). In 1970 he won the international junior chess tournament in Warsaw (ahead of Rainer Knaak, Zbigniew Szymczak and Aleksander Sznapik). In the same year Konstanty Kaiszauri emigrated to Sweden and won the title of this country's junior chess champion. In 1971 he played at the World Junior Chess Championship (in Athens) and the European Junior Chess Championships (in Groningen, 1971/72), achieving significant success in the Netherlands, where he was fourth (behind Gyula Sax and Petar Velikov). Soon he was promoted to the top of Swedish chess players, between 1974 and 1979, starting five times in the finals of the Swedish Chess Championship. The greatest success in these competitions was in 1977 in Stockholm, where he won a bronze medal.

Konstanty Kaiszauri successes on the International Chess tournaments include, among others:

- 1st place (1979/80) and shared 1st place (1975/76) in Rilton Cup tournament in Stockholm,
- 2nd place in Bad Meinberg (1975) behind Heinz Wirthensohn.
- shared 3rd place (1981, after Axel Ornstein and Luben Spasov, together with John Nunn) in Eksjö.

Konstanty Kaiszauri played for Sweden in the Chess Olympiad:

- In 1978, at fourth board in the 23rd Chess Olympiad in Buenos Aires (+2, =1, -4).

Konstanty Kaiszauri played for Sweden in the European Team Chess Championship:

- In 1980, at second reserve board in the 7th European Team Chess Championship in Skara (+3, =1, -1) and won individual gold medal.

Konstanty Kaiszauri played for Sweden in the European Team Chess Championship preliminaries:

- In 1977, at seventh board in the 6th European Team Chess Championship preliminaries (+2, =1, -1),
- In 1980, at fourth board in the 7th European Team Chess Championship preliminaries (+1, =0, -1),
- In 1983, at fifth board in the 8th European Team Chess Championship preliminaries (+0, =0, -2).

Konstanty Kaiszauri played for Sweden in the Nordic Chess Cup:

- In 1974, at fourth board in the 5th Nordic Chess Cup in Eckernförde (+3, =1, -1),
- In 1977, at second board in the 8th Nordic Chess Cup in Glücksburg (+1, =2, -2) and won team gold medal,
- In 1983, at fourth board in the 9th Nordic Chess Cup in Oslo (+2, =4, -1) and won team bronze medal.

In 1977, Konstanty Kaiszauri was awarded the FIDE International Master (IM) title.
