= Csőke =

Csőke is a Hungarian surname. Notable people with the surname include:

- Adrienn Csőke (born 1973), Hungarian chess master
- Katalin Csőke (1957–2017), Hungarian discus thrower
