= Jamaican Chess Championship =

National chess championship of Jamaica

The Jamaican Chess Championship is the yearly national chess championship of Jamaica. The first edition was played in 1969. The championship is usually a twelve-player round-robin tournament. The championship is also used as a qualifier for the Chess Olympiads.

== List of champions ==
Nr	Year	Winner
1	1969	Alfred Thompson
2	1970	Steve Curry
3	1971	Steve Curry
4	1972	Harold Chan
5	1973	Harold Chan
6	1974	Harold Chan
7	1975	Thomas Figueroa; Robert Wheeler
8	1976	Sheldon Wong
9	1977	Sheldon Wong
10	1978	Harold Chan
11	1979	Harold Chan; Robert Wheeler
12	1980	Robert Wheeler
13	1981	Robert Wheeler
14	1982	Orrin Tonsingh
15	1983	Robert Wheeler
16	1984	Shane Matthews
17	1985	Neil Fairclough
18	1986	Shane Matthews
19	1987	Shane Matthews
20	1988	Robert Wheeler
21	1989	Shane Matthews
22	1990	Orrin Tonsingh
23	1991	Grantel Gibbs; Neil Fairclough
24	1992	Ryan Palmer; Jomo Pitterson
25	1993	Jomo Pitterson
26	1994	Grantel Gibbs
27	1995	Russell Porter; Duane Rowe
28	1996	Duane Rowe
29	1997	Shane Matthews
30	1998	Duane Rowe
31	1999	Jomo Pitterson
32	2000	Warren Elliott
33	2001	Warren Elliott
34	2002	Shane Matthews
35	2003	Shane Matthews
36	2004	Warren Elliott
37	2005	Warren Elliott
38	2006	Duane Rowe
39	2007	Warren Elliott
40	2008	Equitable Brown
40	2009	Equitable Brown
41	2010	Warren Elliott
43	2011	Damion Davy
44	2012	Andrew Mellace; Damion Davy
45	2013	Damion Davy
46	2014	Andrew Mellace
47	2015	Warren Elliott
48	2016	Warren Elliott
49	2017	Shreyas Smith
50	2018	Damion Davy
51	2019	Shreyas Smith
52	2020	Shreyas Smith
	2021	Not held (COVID-19)
53	2022	Shreyas Smith
54	2023	Jaden Shaw
56	2024	Shreyas Smith
57	2025	Shreyas Smith
58	2026	Shreyas Smith

Player	Championships Won	Years won
Warren Elliott	8	2000, 2001, 2004, 2005, 2007, 2010, 2015, 2016
Shreyas Smith	7	2017, 2019, 2020, 2022, 2024, 2025, 2026
Shane Matthews	7	1984, 1986, 1987, 1989, 1997, 2002, 2003
Robert Wheeler	6	1975, 1979, 1980, 1981, 1983, 1988
Harold Chan	5	1972, 1973, 1974, 1978, 1979
Duane Rowe	4	1995, 1996, 1998, 2006
Damion Davy	4	2011, 2012, 2013, 2018
Jomo Pitterson	3	1992, 1993, 1999
Steve Curry	2	1970, 1971
Sheldon Wong	2	1976, 1977
Orrin Tonsingh	2	1982, 1990
Neil Fairclough	2	1985, 1991
Grantel Gibbs	2	1991, 1994
Equitable Brown	2	2008, 2009
Andrew Mellace	2	2012, 2014
Alfred Thompson	1	1969
Thomas Figueroa	1	1975
Ryan Palmer	1	1992
Russell Porter	1	1995
Jaden Shaw	1	2023
