= Malaku Lorne =

Jamaican chess player (born 1984)

Personal information
- Born: October 10, 1984 (age 41) Saint Andrew Parish, Jamaica

Chess career
- Country: Jamaica
- Title: FIDE Master (2016)
- Peak rating: 2176 (January 2018)

Ras Malaku Lorne is a Jamaican chess player.

== Chess career ==
He played for Jamaica in the Chess Olympiads of 2004 and 2014.

In July 2012, he won the National Blitz Championships alongside Warren Elliott.

In May 2016, he finished in joint second place at the 2.3.5 Sub-Zonal Chess Tournament, earning the right to represent Jamaica in the Zonal Tournament. He was also awarded the FIDE Master title for this achievement.

In August 2018, he played at the M.R. Games Chess Blitz tournament, where he got off to a perfect start for the first eight rounds, but was defeated by Andrew Mellace in the ninth round.

In April 2019, he won the inaugural Fesco Manchester Chess Open.
