= Max Arie Wotulo =

Indonesian chess player (1932–2000)

Personal information
- Born: 5 August 1932 North Sulawesi, Indonesia
- Died: 2000 (aged 67–68)

Chess career
- Country: Indonesia
- Title: International Master (1969)

Max Arie Wotulo (5 August 1932 – 2000) was an Indonesian chess player. He received the FIDE titles of International Master (IM) in 1969 and International Arbiter in 1978.

== Biography ==
From the mid-1950s to the second half of the 1970s, Max Arie Wotulo was one of Indonesia's leading chess players. He participated many times in Indonesian Chess Championship where he showed the best results in 1955 and 1960 when he shared 2nd–3rd place. In 1969, Max Arie Wotulo participated in World Chess Championship South-East Asian Zonal Tournament in Singapore where he shared 3rd–4th place with Ardiansyah.

Max Arie Wotulo played for Indonesia in the Chess Olympiads:

- In 1960, at first board in the 14th Chess Olympiad in Leipzig (+4, =6, -7),
- In 1966, at second board in the 17th Chess Olympiad in Havana (+3, =6, -3),
- In 1970, at first board in the 19th Chess Olympiad in Siegen (+2, =5, -3),
- In 1972, at first board in the 20th Chess Olympiad in Skopje (+4, =2, -3),
- In 1978, at fourth board in the 23rd Chess Olympiad in Buenos Aires (+1, =0, -1).

Max Arie Wotulo played for Indonesia in the Men's Asian Team Chess Championship:

- In 1974, at third board in the 1st Asian Team Chess Championship in Penang (+3, =0, -2) and won team and individual bronze medals.
