= Giardelli =

Giardelli is an Italian surname. Notable people with the surname include:

- Alessandro Giardelli (racecar driver) (born 2002), Italian professional racing driver
- Arthur Giardelli (1911-2009), Welsh artist of Italian paternal descent
- Sergio Carlos Giardelli (1955-2015), Argentine chess master
