= Women's World Chess Championship 1996 =

The 1996 Women's World Chess Championship was won by Hungarian Zsuzsa Polgar, who defeated the incumbent champion Xie Jun in the title match. Polgar was seeking American Citizenship at the time.

== 1993 Interzonal Tournament ==
As part of the qualification process, an Interzonal tournament was held in Jakarta in July and August 1993, featuring the best players from each FIDE zone. 39 players took part with the top seven qualifying for the Candidates Tournament (Sofieva was eliminated after a playoff against Cramling and Foisor). For the second time, the Interzonal was played as a 13-round Swiss system tournament.

1993 Women's Interzonal Tournament
	Player	Rating	1	2	3	4	5	6	7	8	9	10	11	12	13	Points	Tie break
1	Ketevan Arakhamia (Georgia)	2440	+25	+32	+7	=6	=30	=3	+10	=2	+5	=9	+14	=4	=8	9½	
2	Alisa Galliamova-Ivanchuk (Ukraine)	2435	+31	+5	-6	+26	+4	+12	-3	=1	+13	-14	+9	=8	+10	9	
3	Maia Chiburdanidze (Georgia)	2510	+14	=13	+10	=30	+6	=1	+2	=5	+8	-4	=15	=7	=12	8½	65.75
4	Alisa Marić (Serbia and Montenegro)	2405	=15	+38	+13	=12	-2	+22	=11	=9	+18	+3	=5	=1	=6	8½	61.00
5	Peng Zhaoqin (China)	2335	+35	-2	+19	=11	=22	+7	+6	=3	-1	+13	=4	+15	=17	8½	61.00
6	Pia Cramling (Sweden)	2525	+18	+8	+2	=1	-3	=11	-5	+19	+12	-15	=7	+9	=4	8	61.75
7	Aynur Sofiyeva (Azerbaijan)	2390	+36	+23	-1	+31	-12	-5	-13	+32	+37	+11	=6	=3	+15	8	50.25
8	Cristina Adela Foișor (Romania)	2360	bye	-6	=14	+15	-10	+38	=21	+26	-3	+18	+12	=2	=1	8	47.50
9	Anna-Maria Botsari (Greece)	2245	=12	-26	+33	=13	+17	=21	+30	=4	+11	=1	-2	-6	+20	7½	51.25
10	Svetlana Matveeva (Russia)	2395	+24	+11	-3	=22	+8	+30	-1	-13	-15	+21	+20	+14	-2	7½	50.75
11	Wang Pin (China)	2335	+37	-10	+17	=5	+38	=6	=4	=12	-9	-7	=16	+26	+13	7½	49.00
12	Qin Kanying (China)	2410	=9	=22	+18	=4	+7	-2	+14	=11	-6	=17	-8	+23	=3	7	51.25
13	Nino Gurieli (Georgia)	2355	+29	=3	-4	=9	+28	=16	+7	+10	-2	-5	+19	=17	-11	7	49.00
14	Lidia Semenova (Ukraine)	2285	-3	+29	=8	=16	+34	=26	-12	+30	+21	+2	-1	-10	=18	7	46.50
15	Krystyna Dąbrowska (Poland)	2240	=4	=16	+36	-8	-21	+34	=17	+38	+10	+6	=3	-5	-7	7	46.00
16	Julia Demina (Russia)	2365	=38	=15	=33	=14	=31	=13	-19	+27	-17	+37	=11	=21	+28	7	42.75
17	Margarita Voiska (Bulgaria)	2345	=30	=19	-11	+39	-9	=27	=15	+36	+16	=12	=23	=13	=5	7	41.50
18	Anda Šafranska (Latvia)	2290	-6	+28	-12	=36	+32	+37	=26	+23	-4	-8	=31	+30	=14	7	40.25
19	Irina Kulish (Russia)	2225	=26	=17	-5	=32	+24	=31	+16	-6	=23	+30	-13	-20	+34	6½	39.75
20	Zoja Lelchuk (Ukraine)	2340	=28	+21	-30	-38	-37	=29	+35	=22	+24	+31	-10	+19	-9	6½	39.75
21	Mirjana Marić (Serbia and Montenegro)	2305	=27	-20	+39	=28	+15	=9	=8	=31	-14	-10	+34	=16	=23	6½	38.25
22	Tatjana Shumiakina (Russia)	2320	+39	=12	=26	=10	=5	-4	-23	=20	=28	=34	-30	+35	+33	6½	37.00
23	Nino Khurtsidze (Georgia)	2325	+34	-7	=16	-27	=36	+39	+22	-18	=19	+26	=17	-12	=21	6½	36.50
24	Adrienn Csőke (Hungary)	2235	-10	=37	-27	+35	-19	-32	bye	+25	-20	=33	+39	+31	=26	6½	28.25
25	Yuliya Levitan (USA)	2270	-1	=33	-28	-34	=29	=35	+39	-24	bye	-38	+37	+32	+31	6½	27.00
26	Claudia Amura (Argentina)	2365	=19	+9	=22	-2	+27	=14	=18	-8	=31	-23	+28	-11	=24	6	39.00
27	Xu Yuhua (China)	–	=21	-30	+24	+23	-26	=17	-31	-16	+29	-28	bye	-33	+37	6	30.75
28	Beatriz Marinello (USA)	2160	=20	-18	+25	=21	-13	=36	-38	bye	=22	+27	-26	+29	-16	6	30.75
29	Maria Lucia Ratna Sulistya (Indonesia)	2190	-13	-14	=35	=33	=25	=20	=36	=34	-27	bye	+32	-28	+30	6	28.25
30	Bhagyashree Thipsay (India)	2175	=17	+27	+20	=3	=1	-10	-9	-14	+38	-19	+22	-18	-29	5½	36.00
31	Fliura Uskova (Kazakhstan)	2260	-2	+35	+32	-7	=16	=19	+27	=21	=26	-20	=18	-24	-25	5½	33.50
32	Vera Peicheva-Jürgens (Germany)	2350	+33	-1	-31	=19	-18	+24	=37	-7	=36	+35	-29	-25	+39	5½	28.25
33	Lindri Juni Wijayanti (Indonesia)	2185	-32	=25	-9	=29	-39	bye	=34	-37	=35	=24	+38	+27	-22	5½	25.50
34	Lisa Karlina Lumongdong (Indonesia)	2080	-23	-36	bye	+25	-14	-15	=33	=29	+39	=22	-21	+38	-19	5½	22.50
35	Viktoria Johansson (Sweden)	2155	-5	-31	=29	-24	bye	=25	-20	+39	=33	-32	+36	-22	+38	5½	21.00
36	Nava Starr (Canada)	2210	-7	+34	-15	=18	=23	=28	=29	-17	=32	=39	-35	bye	FF*	5	22.25
37	Julia Tverskaya (USA)	2090	-11	=24	-38	bye	+20	-18	=32	+33	-7	-16	-25	+39	-27	5	20.50
38	Martina Holoubkova (Czech Republic)	2235	=16	-4	+37	+20	-11	-8	+28	-15	-30	+25	-33	-34	-35	4½	
39	Caroline Bijoux (South Africa)	–	-22	bye	-21	-17	+33	-23	-25	-35	-34	=36	-24	-37	-32	2½	

Starr forfeited her last round game, so no bye was needed for that round.

== 1994–95 Candidates Tournament ==
The seven qualifiers from the Interzonal Tournament were joined by the two finalists from the previous tournament, Ioseliani and Polgar. These nine players contested a double round-robin tournament in Tilburg in September 1994, from which the top two would advance to the final to determine the challenger. Polgar and ex-champion Chiburdanidze shared first place two points ahead of the competition. The final was played in Saint Petersburg in March 1995 and dominated by Polgar who won the match 5½–1½ without losing a single game.

1994 Women's Candidates Tournament
	Player	Rating	1	2	3	4	5	6	7	8	9	Points	Tie break
1	Zsuzsa Polgar (Hungary)	2550	-	1	1½	1½	2	1	1	1½	1	10½	81.25
2	Maia Chiburdanidze (Georgia)	2520	1	-	1½	½	1½	1½	1	2	1½	10½	79.00
3	Pia Cramling (Sweden)	2525	½	½	-	1	0	2	1½	1½	1½	8½	
4	Alisa Galliamova-Ivanchuk (Ukraine)	2475	½	1½	1	-	1	½	1	½	2	8	61.75
5	Alisa Marić (Serbia and Montenegro)	2400	0	½	2	1	-	1	1	1	1½	8	59.25
6	Peng Zhaoqin (China)	2370	1	½	0	1½	1	-	1	1½	1	7½	
7	Nana Ioseliani (Georgia)	2435	1	1	½	1	1	1	-	1	½	7	58.25
8	Cristina Adela Foișor (Romania)	2405	½	0	½	1½	1	½	1	-	2	7	50.25
9	Ketevan Arakhamia (Georgia)	2450	1	½	½	0	½	1	1½	0	–	5	

Women's Candidates Final 1995
	1	2	3	4	5	6	7	Total
Maia Chiburdanidze (Georgia)	½	½	0	0	½	0	0	1½
Zsuzsa Polgar (HUN)	½	½	1	1	½	1	1	5½

== 1996 Championship Match ==
The championship match was played in Jaén in 1996 and, like the Candidates Tournament, dominated by Polgar who won 6 games (against 2) and in the end defeated champion Xie Jun by four points. The match was set for 16 matches, but ended early, when Polgar reached 8.5 points. The organizer apparently threatened to fine both players after draws in game 2 and 3.

Women's World Championship Match 1996
	1	2	3	4	5	6	7	8	9	10	11	12	13	Total
Zsuzsa Polgar (Hungary)	0	½	½	1	1	½	1	1	½	½	1	0	1	8½
Xie Jun (China)	1	½	½	0	0	½	0	0	½	½	0	1	0	4½
