= Irina Kryukova =

Russian chess player (born 1968)

Personal information
- Born: Irina Viktorovna Kryukova; 18 May 1968 (age 58) Krasnoyarsk, Russia

Chess career
- Country: Russia
- Title: Woman Grandmaster (2001)
- Peak rating: 2326 (October 2001)

Irina Viktorovna Kryukova (Russian: Ирина Викторовна Крюкова; born 18 May 1968), née Kulish, is a Russian chess player who holds the FIDE title of Woman Grandmaster (WGM, 2001).

== Biography ==
In the early and mid-1990s, Irina Kryukova was among the leading female chess players in Russia. In 1994, she won silver medal in Russian Women's Chess Championship behind Ekaterina Kovalevskaya.

Irina Kryukova two times participated in the Women's World Chess Championship Interzonal Tournaments:

- In 1993, at Interzonal Tournament in Jakarta ranked 19th place;
- In 1995, at Interzonal Tournament in Chişinău ranked 38th place.

Irina Kryukova played for Russia-2 team in the Women's Chess Olympiad:

- In 1994, at first board in the 31st Chess Olympiad (women) in Moscow (+5, =5, -2).

In 1993, she was awarded the FIDE Woman International Master (WIM) title and received the FIDE Woman Grandmaster (WGM) title eight year later. Also Kryukova received FIDE International Arbiter (IA, 2011) and FIDE International Organizer (FIO, 2012) titles.

Known as a chess trainer in various chess schools in Moscow and Moscow Oblast, where she has worked for more than 20 years.
