= Arovah Bachtiar =

Indonesian chess player (born 1934)

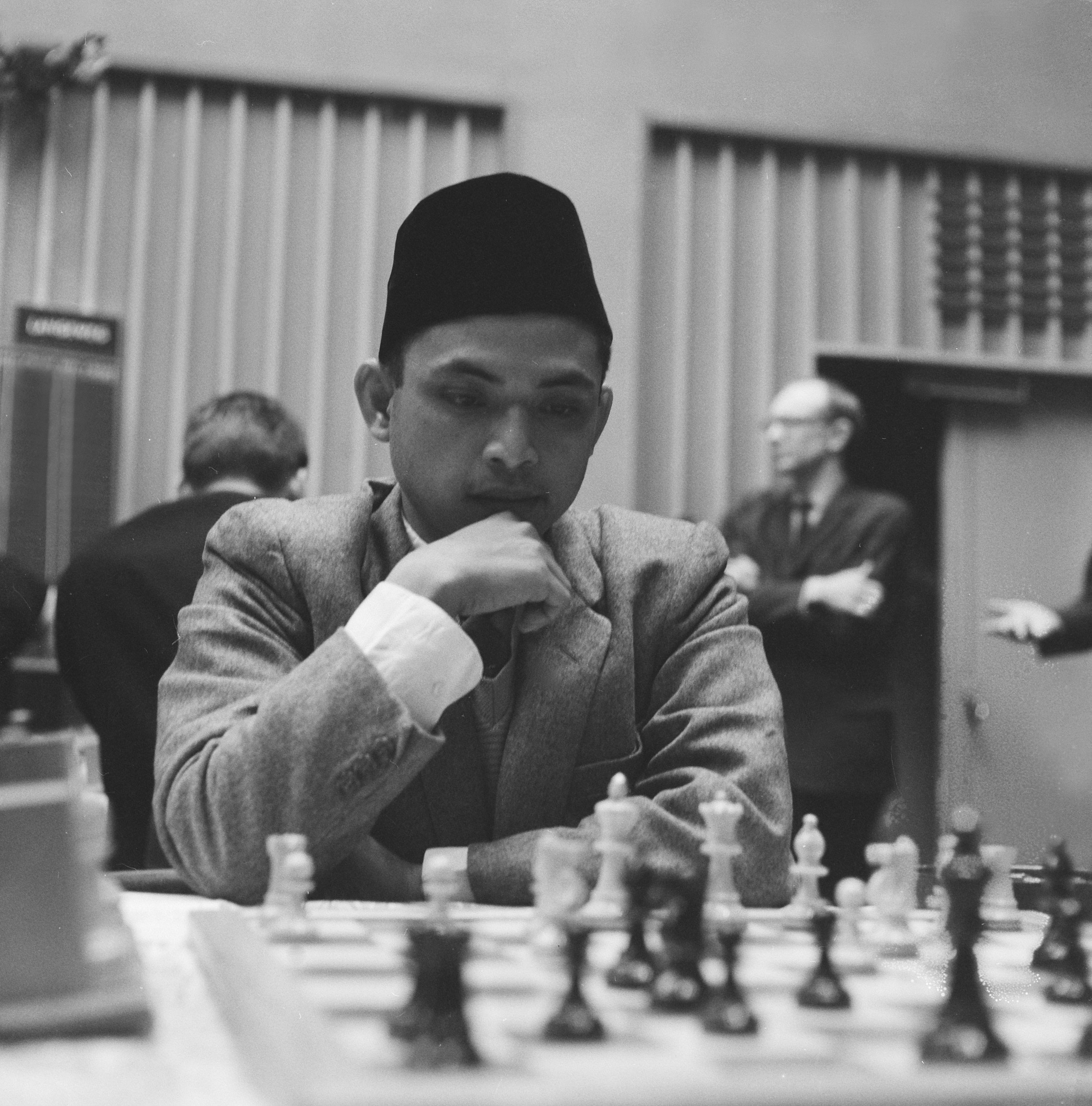
- Arovah Bachtiar in 1966

Personal information
- Born: 25 March 1934 (age 92)

Chess career
- Country: Indonesia
- Title: International Master (1978)
- Peak rating: 2400 (July 1971)

Arovah Bachtiar (born 25 March 1934) is an Indonesian International master (IM) (1978). He is a four-times Indonesian Chess Championship winner (1953, 1962, 1967, 1971).

== Biography ==
From the early 1950s to the second half of the 1970s, Arovah Bachtiar was one of Indonesia's leading chess players. He four time won the Indonesian Chess Championship: in 1953, 1962, 1967, and 1971. In September 1963, Arovah Bachtiar participated in World Chess Championship South-East Asian Zonal Tournament in Jakarta, where shared 1st–2nd place with Béla Berger but lost the additional match. Arovah Bachtiar participated twice more in World Chess Championship Zonal Tournaments (1972, 1975) but no longer repeated this success.

Arovah Bachtiar played for Indonesia in the Chess Olympiads:

- In 1960, at second board in the 14th Chess Olympiad in Leipzig (+12, =2, -6),
- In 1966, at first board in the 17th Chess Olympiad in Havana (+3, =8, -7),
- In 1970, at fourth board in the 19th Chess Olympiad in Siegen (+10, =6, -2),
- In 1972, at third board in the 20th Chess Olympiad in Skopje (+5, =4, -8),
- In 1978, at third board in the 23rd Chess Olympiad in Buenos Aires (+3, =4, -1).

Arovah Bachtiar played for Indonesia in the Men's Asian Team Chess Championships:

- In 1974, at first board in the 1st Asian Team Chess Championship in Penang (+3, =2, -1) and won team and individual bronze medals,
- In 1979, at reserve board in the 3rd Asian Team Chess Championship in Singapore (+3, =1, -0) and won team bronze and individual gold medals.

In 1978, Arovah Bachtiar awarded the FIDE International Master (IM) title.
