= Ryan Palmer (chess player) =

Jamaican-English chess player

Personal information
- Born: 23 January 1974 (age 52)

Chess career
- Country: England

Ryan Palmer (born 23 January 1974) is an English chess player of Jamaican origin; he was the Jamaican National Champion in 1992. During the academic years of 2004 to 2007, he taught mathematics at Adams' Grammar School in Newport, Shropshire, and now has moved to the United States, to pursue further studies. In both 2006 and 2007, he and his teammates were the Shropshire Chess League Division 1 Champions. In 2007, Palmer accomplished one win, one draw, and one loss leading to an accumulative score of 50%. He later returned to the UK to teach at St Olave's Grammar School, Orpington and is now teaching maths at Richmond Park Academy.
