= Martina Kořenová =

Czech chess player (born 1975)

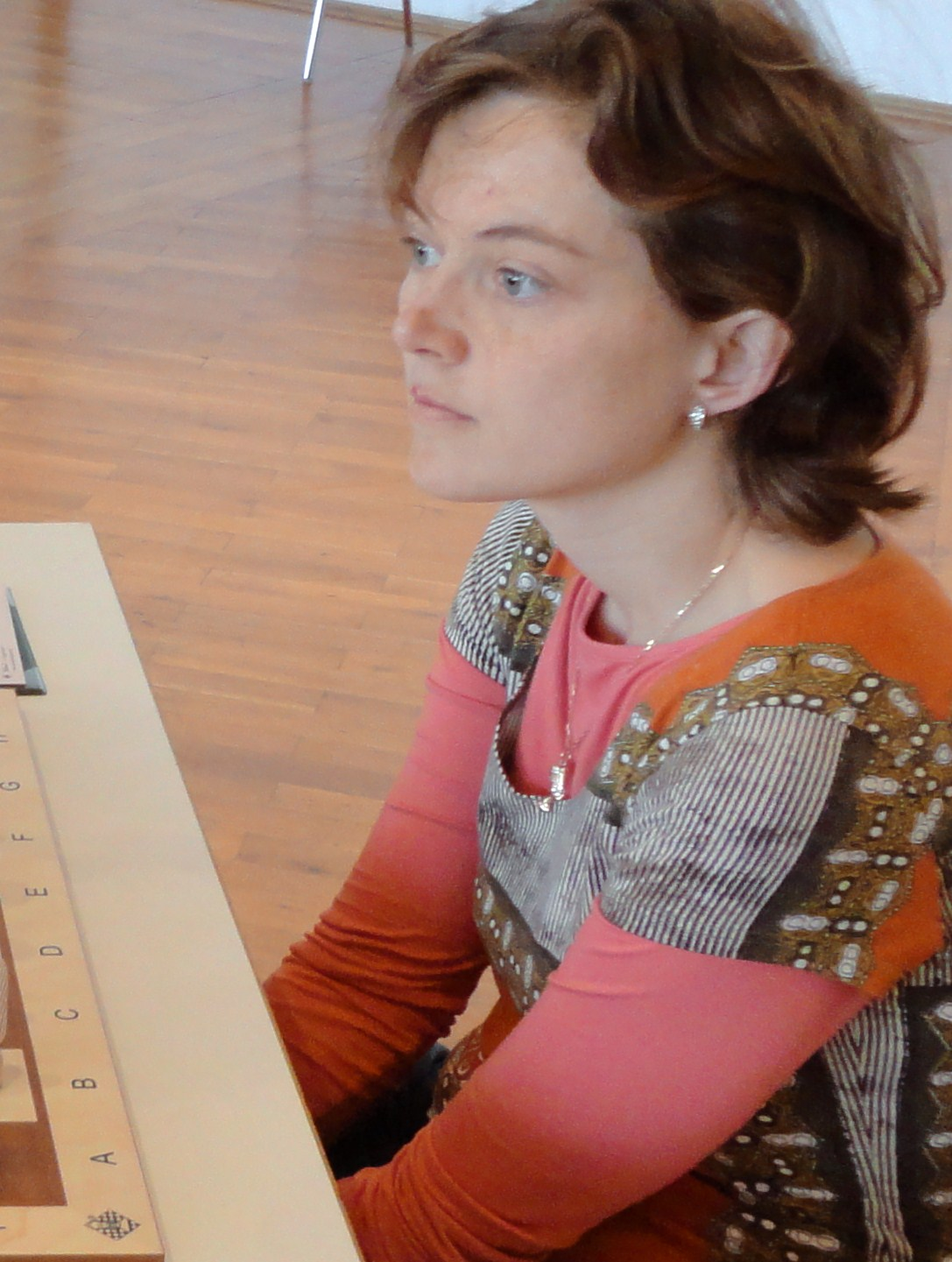
- Kořenová in 2012

Personal information
- Born: 26 April 1975 (age 51)

Chess career
- Country: Czechoslovakia; Czech Republic
- Title: Woman International Master (1993)
- FIDE rating: 2164 (July 2020)
- Peak rating: 2335 (January 1996)

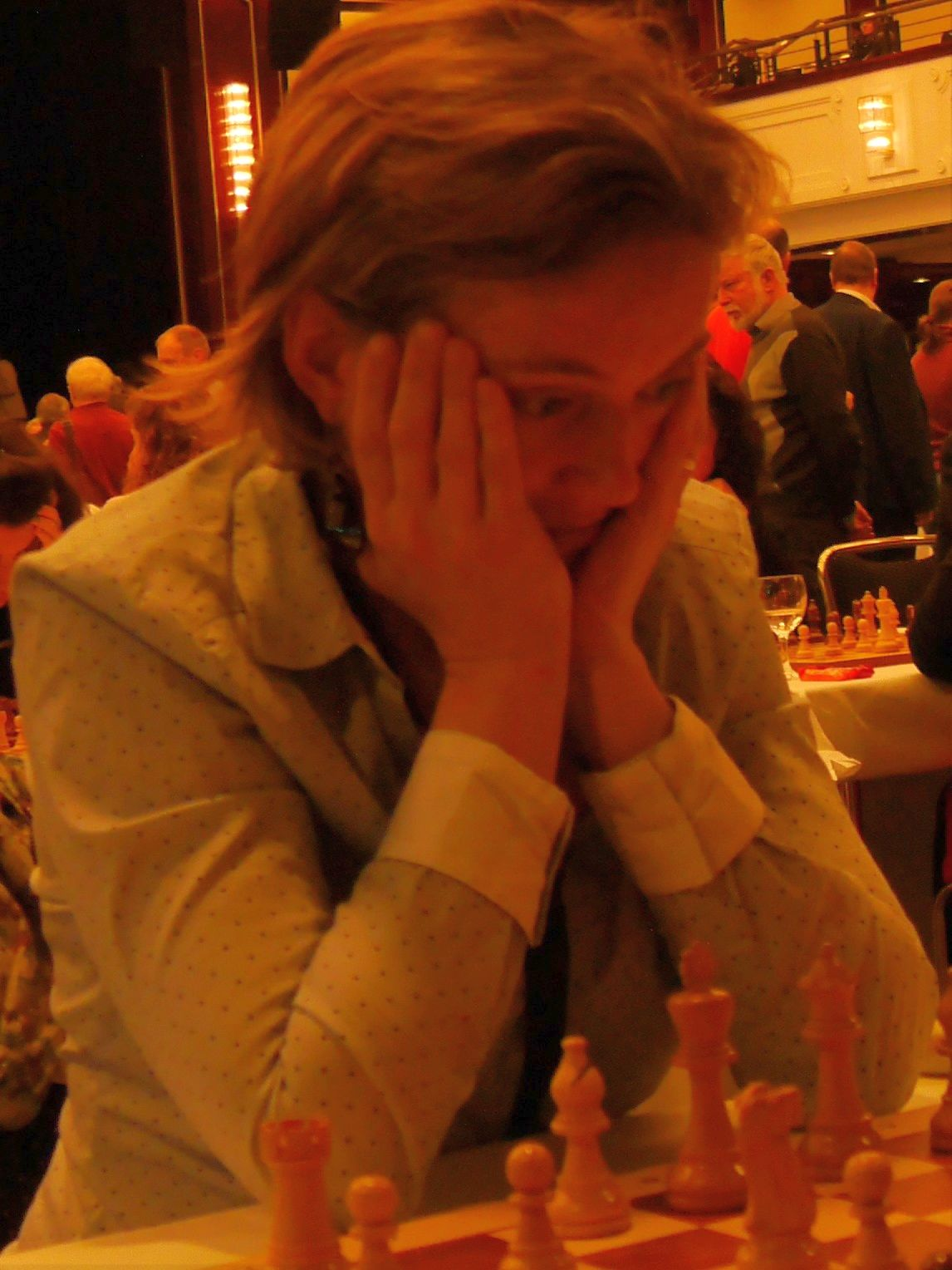
Martina Kořenová during the final rounds of the German Chess Bundesliga 2017 in Berlin.

Martina Kořenová (née Holoubková, born 26 April 1975) is a Czech chess player who holds the FIDE title of Woman International Master (WIM, 1993).

== Biography ==
In the first half of the 1990s, Kořenová was one of the Czech leading female chess players. In 1992, she won silver medal in Czechoslovak Women's Chess Championship. In 1993, in Tišnov she won silver medal in Czech Women's Chess Championship. In 1993, Martina Kořenová participated in Women's World Chess Championship Interzonal Tournament in Jakarta where ranked 38th place.

She played for Czech Republic in the Women's Chess Olympiad:

- In 1994, at first board in the 31st Chess Olympiad (women) in Moscow (+6, =3, -3).

Kořenová played for Czech Republic in the European Team Chess Championship:

- In 1992, at first reserve board in the 1st European Team Chess Championship (women) in Debrecen (+2, =2, -0).

In 1993, she awarded the FIDE Woman International Master (WIM) title.

== Personal life ==
In 1999, she married Vladimír Kořen, who is a Czech presenter, science communicator and local politician. They have 2 daughters and 2 sons.
