= 23rd Chess Olympiad =

1978 chess tournament in Buenos Aires, Argentina

Official logo of the Olympiad

The 23rd Chess Olympiad (Spanish: La 23^{a} Olimpíada de ajedrez), organized by FIDE and comprising an open and a women's tournament, as well as several other events designed to promote the game of chess, took place between October 25 and November 12, 1978, in Buenos Aires, Argentina.

After the boycott two years earlier, the Eastern Bloc countries were back, including the Soviet team who, as usual, were huge favourites——but in the end they had to settle for the silver medal. Hungary, led by Lajos Portisch, caused quite an upset by taking the gold medals by a full point. The United States took the bronze.

This tournament also witnessed the debut of China, which placed 20th with six untitled players, and later became a chess power and won the Chess Olympiad in 2014 and 2018.

== Open event ==
Sixty-five nations played a 14-round Swiss system tournament. To make for an even number of teams, the Argentine hosts also fielded a "B" team. In the event of a draw, the tie-break was decided first by using the Buchholz system, then by match points.

Open event
#	Country	Players	Average rating	Points	Buchholz
1	Hungary	Portisch, Ribli, Sax, Adorján, Csom, Vadász	2570	37	
2	Soviet Union	Spassky, Petrosian, Polugaevsky, Gulko, Romanishin, Vaganian	2620	36	
3	United States	Kavalek, Browne, Lein, Byrne, Tarjan, Lombardy	2553	35	
4	West Germany	Hübner, Unzicker, Pfleger, Darga, Hecht, Borik	2540	33	
5	Israel	Dzindzichashvili, Liberzon, Kagan, Bleiman, Birnboim, Gruenfeld	2509	32½	442.5
6	Romania	Gheorghiu, Ciocâltea, Ghițescu, Șubă, Ghindă, Troianescu	2468	32½	422.5
7	Denmark	Hamann, Jakobsen, Kristiansen, Fedder, Høi, Blom	2416	32	440.5
8	Poland	Schmidt, Kuligowski, Sznapik, Adamski, Pytel, Filipowicz	2449	32	437.0
9	Spain	Díez del Corral, Pomar, Calvo, Bellón López, Sanz Alonso, Rivas Pastor	2429	32	430.5
10	Switzerland	Korchnoi, Hug, Lombard, Wirthensohn, Huss, Bhend	2484	32	426.0
11	Canada	Hébert, Biyiasas, Day, Piasetski, Nickoloff, Coudari	2388	32	422.5
12	England	Miles, Stean, Keene, Hartston, Mestel, Nunn	2508	31½	452.5
13	Bulgaria	Radulov, Ermenkov, Tringov, Padevsky, Spasov, Inkiov	2486	31½	437.0
14	Netherlands	Timman, Sosonko, Donner, Ree, Ligterink, Langeweg	2538	31½	432.5
15	Yugoslavia	Gligorić, Ljubojević, Matanović, Ivkov, Velimirović, Parma	2558	31	438.0
16	Sweden	Andersson, Ornstein, Schneider, Kaiszauri, Schüssler, Wedberg	2453	31	437.5
17	Argentina	Emma, Bronstein, Hase, Cámpora, Szmetan, Grinberg	2409	31	418.0
18	Cuba	García González, Hernández, Rodríguez Céspedes, Vilela de Acuña, García Martínez, Lebredo Zarragoitia	2486	30½	437.0
19	Austria	Robatsch, Hölzl, Stoppel, Wittmann, Janetschek, Dür	2389	30½	417.0
20	China	Qi Jingxuan, Chen De, Liu Wenzhe, Liang Jinrong, Chang Tung Lo, Zhang Weida	2273	30½	413.5
21	Mexico	Sisniega, Campos López, Villarreal, Aldrete, Escondrillas, Navarro	2361	30½	393.5
22	Finland	Westerinen, Rantanen, Hurme, Saren, Raaste, Kivipelto	2389	30	421.0
23	Colombia	García, Gutierrez, Rodríguez, Zapata, de Greiff, Agudelo	2359	30	400.5
24	Philippines	Torre E., Rodríguez, Mascariñas, Bordonada, Torre V., de Guzman	2405	29½	407.0
25	New Zealand	Sarapu, Chandler, Small, Stuart, Anderson, Weir	2270	29½	396.0
26	Indonesia	Suradiradja, Ardiansyah, Bachtiar, Wotulo, Sampouw, Kileng	2346	29½	394.0
27	Brazil	Trois, van Riemsdijk, Segal, Braga, Másculo, Carvalho	2355	29½	393.5
28	Iceland	Ólafsson F., Sigurjónsson, Ólafsson H., Pétursson, Árnason, Ásmundsson	2480	29	423.0
29	Chile	Donoso Velasco, Frias Pablaza, Morovic, Silva Sánchez, Scholz Solis, Cifuentes Parada	2395	29	417.0
30	Australia	Jamieson, Fuller, Shaw, Rogers, Woodhams, Viner	2399	29	408.0
31	Norway	Wibe, Helmers, Øgaard, Hoen, Johannessen, Heiberg	2409	29	398.0
-	Argentina "B"	Giardelli, Seidler, Barbero, Braga, Bernat, Monier	2329	28½	413.0
32	Paraguay	Franco Ocampos, Gamarra Cáceres, Riego Prieto, Bogda, Ferreira, Ingolotti	2278	28½	411.5
33	Scotland	Pritchett, Levy, Jamieson, Upton, Giulian, Reid	2309	28	404.5
34	Venezuela	Ostos, Fernández, Diaz, Gamboa, Dounia, González	2253	28	401.5
35	Syria	Arafeh, Hakki, Catalan, Khatib, Kassen M., Khattab	2200	28	373.0
36	France	Haïk, Giffard, Preissmann, Roos, Sellos, Letzelter	2358	27½	425.0
37	Uruguay	Estrada Degrandi, Dienavorian Lacherian, Silva Nazzari, Bademian Orchanian, Lamas Baliero, Pazdur González	2270	27½	381.5
38	Dominican Republic	Gonzáles, Delgado, Álvarez, Mateo, Pérez Nivar, Liao Yuan Eu	2229	27½	380.5
39	Sri Lanka	Weeramantry, Aturupane D. H. C., Goonetilleke, Parakrama	2200	27½	373.5
40	Hong Kong	Jhunjhnuwala K., Valdellon, Kan Wai Shui, Jhunjhnuwala R., Schepel, Jhunjhnuwala N.	2235	27½	367.0
41	Wales	Cooper, Williams, Hutchings, Jones, Trevelyan, Tyrrell	2324	27	403.5
42	Peru	Rodríguez Vargas, González Bernal, Vásquez Horna, Vásquez, Pelaez Contti, Robbiano Taboada	2271	27	399.5
43	Guyana	Broomes M., Broomes G., Wharton, Warsali, Brooms	2200	27	369.0
44	Japan	Takemoto, Matsumoto, Sakurai, Ozaki, Oda, Tanuma	2200	27	359.0
45	Luxembourg	Stull, Schammo, Milbers, Kirsch, Welz, Philippe	2219	27	353.0
46	Faroe Islands	Jacobsen, Apol, Petersen, Ziska, Midjord, Durhuus	2200	27	346.0
47	Belgium	Schumacher, Wostyn, Mollekens, Van Herck, Larsen, De Hert	2223	26½	374.5
48	Guatemala	De León, Batres, Canda, Grajeda, Garrido, Cruz Lorenzana	2200	26½	358.0
49	Morocco	Chorfi, Al-Hamido, Arbouche, El-Amri, Khatib S., Bakali	2200	26½	356.0
50	Tunisia	Bouaziz, Belkadi, Tabbane, Kchouk, Hmadi, Zargouni	2279	26	390.0
51	Ecuador	Verduga, Pazos, Salvador, Freile, Frank, Márquez	2266	26	381.5
52	Bolivia	Chávez Chávez, Zarco Castillo, Mendivil, Alborta, Orestes, Palacios Alvarez	2213	26	368.0
53	Trinidad and Tobago	Cecil Lee, Payne, Courtney Lee, Duchesne, Lum Tong, Chin Fong	2200	26	356.5
54	Jordan	Arafat, Shoumali, Al-Mallah, Bakr, Haddad, Saqqa	2200	26	327.5
55	Jamaica	Wong S., Grant, Wong A., Powell	2200	25½	
56	Puerto Rico	Moraza Choisme, Freyre, Torres, Ochoa, Martínez Buitrago, Ferrao	2214	25	373.0
57	Malaysia	Tan Bian Huat, Woo Beng Keong, Hon Kah Seng, Liew Chee Meng, Foo Lum Choon, How	2200	25	365.5
58	Libya	Shabsh Abdulatif, El-Ageli, Tawengi, Isgeta, Talha, Aburziza M.	2200	23½	321.0
59	Mauritania	Bouasria, Radhy Sol, El-Mokhtar, Louly, Maouloud	2200	23½	319.5
60	Andorra	Clua Ballague, Pantebre Martínez, Gómez Abad, Pantebre Martínez, Fité Barris, Vañó	2200	22½	
61	United States Virgin Islands	Van Tilbury, Hoyt, Grumer, Chiu Yum San, Hanno, John Turner	2200	22	
62	Bermuda	Yerbury, Radford, Harris, Chudleigh, Dill, Lattyak	2200	20½	
63	Zaire	De Vries, Ciezkowski, Merali, Biringanine	2200	16	
64	United Arab Emirates	Hassan, Saleh, Abdulghafour, Abdul Rahman, Al-Kaitoob, Zainal	2200	12½	328.5
65	British Virgin Islands	Hook, Georges, Pickering, Campbell, Downing	2213	12½	327.5

=== Team standing ===
The following ratings were used to determine the placement (#).

- BP (sum of board points)
- TP (sum of team points)

#	Team	Code	BP	TP	+	=	-	1	2	3	4	5	6	7	8	9	10	11	12	13	14
1	Hungary	HUN	37	23	10	3	1	SCO; 3½	POL; 3	NED; 3	ESP; 2½	USA; 2	URS; 1½	DEN; 2	ENG; 3	BUL; 2½	GER; 2	ISL; 3	SWE; 3½	ISR; 2½	YUG; 3
2	Soviet Union	URS	36	23	10	3	1	WLS; 3	ARG2; 3½	ROM; 3	CUB; 3	ENG; 2	HUN; 2½	BUL; 2½	USA; 3	GER; 1½	ISR; 2	SWE; 2	POL; 2½	CAN; 3	NED; 2½
3	United States	USA	35	23	10	3	1	PAR; 3	AUT; 2½	CAN; 3	AUS; 3	HUN; 2	ENG; 2½	YUG; 2½	URS; 1	DEN; 4	CUB; 2½	GER; 2½	ISR; 2½	POL; 2	SUI; 2
4	West Germany	GER	33	17	6	5	3	NZL; 4	CHI; 2½	CUB; 1	FIN; 3	DEN; 1½	SWE; 2	WLS; 4	ARG; 3	URS; 2½	HUN; 2	USA; 1½	YUG; 2	ENG; 2	ISR; 2
5	Israel	ISR	32½	18	7	4	3	ECU; 4	BRA; 2½	ESP; 1	CAN; 2½	PHI; 2	FRA; 2½	ROM; 2	FIN; 3	POL; 2½	URS; 2	CUB; 3½	USA; 1½	HUN; 1½	GER; 2
6	Romania	ROM	32½	16	6	4	4	PUR; 4	CAN; 1½	URS; 1	INA; 1½	CHN; 2½	TUN; 4	ISR; 2	BUL; 2	FRA; 2	ARG2; 3	YUG; 1½	ISL; 3	ESP; 2	ENG; 2½
7	Denmark	DEN	32	20	8	4	2	JPN; 3	MEX; 2½	COL; 3	YUG; 2	GER; 2½	CAN; 3½	HUN; 2	CUB; 2	USA; 0	SUI; 2½	ENG; 1	CHI; 3½	BUL; 2	AUT; 2½
8	Poland	POL	32	17	7	3	4	MAS; 3½	HUN; 1	HKG; 2½	BRA; 4	SWE; 2½	PHI; 2	ENG; 2½	YUG; 1½	ISR; 1½	FRA; 3	ESP; 2½	URS; 1½	USA; 2	CAN; 2
9	Spain	ESP	32	15	6	3	5	GUA; 4	VEN; 2½	ISR; 3	HUN; 1½	BUL; 1½	FIN; 2	FRA; 1½	AUS; 3½	SUI; 1½	AUT; 3	POL; 1½	CUB; 2	ROM; 2	SWE; 2½
10	Switzerland	SUI	32	19	8	3	3	BEL; 3	FRA; 1½	MEX; 2½	CHN; 2½	CHI; 3½	YUG; 1	BRA; 2½	SWE; 2	ESP; 2½	DEN; 1½	PHI; 3	ENG; 2	AUT; 2½	USA; 2
11	Canada	CAN	32	16	7	2	5	LBA; 4	ROM; 2½	USA; 1	ISR; 1½	SCO; 3½	DEN ½	DOM; 3½	CHI; 2	ENG; 1	PER; 3	PAR; 2½	FRA; 4	URS; 1	POL; 2
12	England	ENG	31½	15	6	3	5	DOM; 4	COL; 3½	ARG; 2½	BUL; 2½	URS; 2	USA; 1½	POL; 1½	HUN; 1	CAN; 3	SWE; 1½	DEN; 3	SUI; 2	GER; 2	ROM; 1½
13	Bulgaria	BUL	31½	16	7	2	5	LUX; 4	INA; 3	FRA; 2½	ENG; 1½	ESP; 2½	CUB; 3	URS; 1½	ROM; 2	HUN; 1½	ISL; 1	ARG; 3	NED; 1½	DEN; 2	FIN; 2½
14	Netherlands	NED	31½	17	7	3	4	URU; 4	FIN; 3	HUN; 1	ARG; 2½	CUB; 1	COL; 2	SWE; 1½	CHN; 2	PAR; 2½	BRA; 3	ARG2; 3	BUL; 2½	YUG; 2	URS; 1½
15	Yugoslavia	YUG	31	18	7	4	3	TUN; 3½	AUS; 2½	NOR; 2½	DEN; 2	FRA; 2	SUI; 3	USA; 1½	POL; 2½	CUB; 1½	ARG; 2½	ROM; 2½	GER; 2	NED; 2	HUN; 1
16	Sweden	SWE	31	17	7	3	4	HKG; 3	NOR; 1½	BEL; 3½	CHI; 2½	POL; 1½	GER; 2	NED; 2½	SUI; 2	CHN; 3½	ENG; 2½	URS; 2	HUN ½	FIN; 2½	ESP; 1½
17	Argentina	ARG	31	16	8	0	6	BOL; 3	CHN; 3½	ENG; 1½	NED; 1½	COL; 2½	INA; 3	ISL; 2½	GER; 1	PER; 3	YUG; 1½	BUL; 1	AUT; 1	NOR; 2½	VEN; 3½
18	Cuba	CUB	30½	17	7	3	4	PER; 2½	MAR; 4	GER; 3	URS; 1	NED; 3	BUL; 1	PHI; 3	DEN; 2	YUG; 2½	USA; 1½	ISR ½	ESP; 2	ISL; 2½	CHN; 2
19	Austria	AUT	30½	15	7	1	6	GUY; 2½	USA; 1½	SCO; 2½	NZL; 1½	PAR; 2	CHN ½	HKG; 3	MAS; 3½	AUS; 4	ESP; 1	FIN; 2½	ARG; 3	SUI; 1½	DEN; 1½
20	China	CHN	30½	15	6	3	5	ISL; 3	ARG ½	DOM; 3½	SUI; 1½	ROM; 1½	AUT; 3½	FIN; 2	NED; 2	SWE ½	VEN; 1½	TUN; 2½	SYR; 2½	ECU; 4	CUB; 2
21	Mexico	MEX	30½	16	7	2	5	TRI; 3	DEN; 1½	SUI; 1½	URU; 3	VEN; 1½	PAR; 1	PUR; 3	PER; 1	DOM; 2½	NOR; 2	BOL; 3	ECU; 3	COL; 2	ISL; 2½
22	Finland	FIN	30	14	6	2	6	JAM; 4	NED; 1	ARG2; 2½	GER; 1	PER; 3	ESP; 2	CHN; 2	ISR; 1	NZL; 3	COL; 3	AUT; 1½	VEN; 3	SWE; 1½	BUL; 1½
23	Colombia	COL	30	15	5	5	4	UAE; 4	ENG ½	DEN; 1	HKG; 4	ARG; 1½	NED; 2	SCO; 2½	NOR; 3	ISL; 2	FIN; 1	CHI; 2	PHI; 2½	MEX; 2	BRA; 2
24	Philippines	PHI	29½	16	6	4	4	AND; 2	PER; 2½	WLS; 3½	ISL; 2½	ISR; 2	POL; 2	CUB; 1	INA; 2½	ARG2; 1½	CHI; 2½	SUI; 1	COL; 1½	SCO; 3	NZL; 2
25	New Zealand	NZL	29½	15	7	1	6	GER; 0	SRI; 3	LUX; 3½	AUT; 2½	INA; 1½	BRA; 1½	MAS; 3½	ARG2; 2	FIN; 1	TUN; 2½	ECU; 1	JPN; 3½	PER; 3	PHI; 2
26	Indonesia	INA	29½	14	6	2	6	ZAI; 4	BUL; 1	CHI; 1½	ROM; 2½	NZL; 2½	ARG; 1	VEN; 2½	PHI; 1½	NOR; 1	ECU; 2	SCO; 1½	GUA; 4	AUS; 2	PAR; 2½
27	Brazil	BRA	29½	14	6	2	6	IVB; 4	ISR; 1½	VEN; 2½	POL; 0	TUN; 3	NZL; 2½	SUI; 1½	WLS; 2½	CHI; 1½	NED; 1	AUS; 2	BOL; 4	PAR; 1½	COL; 2
28	Iceland	ISL	29	13	6	1	7	CHN; 1	JPN; 4	PAR; 3	PHI; 1½	AUS; 2½	VEN; 3	ARG; 1½	FRA; 2½	COL; 2	BUL; 3	HUN; 1	ROM; 1	CUB; 1½	MEX; 1½
29	Chile	CHI	29	14	5	4	5	SRI; 4	GER; 1½	INA; 2½	SWE; 1½	SUI ½	SCO; 2	JAM; 4	CAN; 2	BRA; 2½	PHI; 1½	COL; 2	DEN ½	ARG2; 2½	AUS; 2
30	Australia	AUS	29	15	6	3	5	ISV; 3½	YUG; 1½	FAI; 3½	USA; 1	ISL; 1½	NOR; 2½	PAR; 2½	ESP ½	AUT; 0	SRI; 4	BRA; 2	ARG2; 2½	INA; 2	CHI; 2
31	Norway	NOR	29	14	6	2	6	BER; 3½	SWE; 2½	YUG; 1½	FRA; 1	ECU; 3	AUS; 1½	ARG2; 2	COL; 1	INA; 3	MEX; 2	VEN; 1½	PAR; 2½	ARG; 1½	WLS; 2½
-	Argentina "B"	ARG2	28½	12	5	2	7	JOR; 4	URS ½	FIN; 1½	PAR; 2	WLS; 1½	SYR; 4	NOR; 2	NZL; 3	PHI; 2½	ROM; 1	NED; 1	AUS; 1½	CHI; 1½	FRA; 2½
32	Paraguay	PAR	28½	12	5	2	7	USA; 1	AND; 4	ISL; 1	ARG2; 2	AUT; 2	MEX; 3	AUS; 1½	VEN; 3	NED; 1½	WLS; 2½	CAN; 1½	NOR; 1½	BRA; 2½	INA; 1½
33	Scotland	SCO	28	14	6	2	6	HUN ½	MAS; 3½	AUT; 1½	GUY; 4	CAN ½	CHI; 2	COL; 1½	DOM; 2	ECU; 1½	URU; 2½	INA; 2½	WLS; 2½	PHI; 1	PER; 2½
34	Venezuela	VEN	28	13	6	1	7	MAU; 4	ESP; 1½	BRA; 1½	ECU; 2	MEX; 2½	ISL; 1	INA; 1½	PAR; 1	PUR; 3½	CHN; 2½	NOR; 2½	FIN; 1	FRA; 3	ARG ½
35	Syria	SYR	28	13	6	1	7	FRA; 0	URU; 1½	BOL; 2½	BER; 3½	DOM; 1½	ARG2; 0	LUX; 3	SRI; 2	TUN; 1½	MAR; 3	PUR; 3½	CHN; 1½	WLS; 1½	TRI; 3
36	France	FRA	27½	12	5	2	7	SYR; 4	SUI; 2½	BUL; 1½	NOR; 3	YUG; 2	ISR; 1½	ESP; 2½	ISL; 1½	ROM; 2	POL; 1	PER; 3½	CAN; 0	VEN; 1	ARG2; 1½
37	Uruguay	URU	27½	15	5	5	4	NED; 0	SYR; 2½	MAU; 4	MEX; 1	BOL; 2	MAS; 1	SRI; 2	GUY; 2½	FAI; 2	SCO; 1½	GUA; 2½	DOM; 2½	TUN; 2	HKG; 2
38	Dominican Republic	DOM	27½	14	5	4	5	ENG; 0	UAE; 3½	CHN ½	MAR; 3	SYR; 2½	BOL; 3½	CAN ½	SCO; 2	MEX; 1½	TRI; 2	WAL; 22	URU; 1½	GUY; 3	SRI; 2
39	Sri Lanka	SRI	27½	13	3	7	4	CHI; 0	NZL; 1	MAS; 2	GUA; 1½	AND; 3½	MAU; 2	URU; 2	SYR; 2	JAM; 4	AUS; 0	FAI; 3½	TUN; 2	LUX; 2	DOM; 2
40	Hong Kong	HKG	27½	12	5	2	7	SWE; 1	BER; 4	POL; 1½	COL; 0	TRI; 3	JAM; 1	AUT; 1	JPN; 3½	WLS; 1	BOL; 0	UAE; 4	MAS; 3½	BEL; 2	URU; 2
41	Wales	WLS	27	13	6	1	7	URS; 1	TRI; 3	PHI ½	BEL; 3½	ARG2; 2½	ECU; 3	GER; 0	BRA; 1½	HKG; 3	PAR; 1½	DOM; 2	SCO; 1½	SYR; 2½	NOR; 1½
42	Peru	PER	27	11	5	1	8	CUB; 1½	PHI; 1½	TUN; 2	FAI; 3½	FIN; 1	PUR; 2½	GUY; 3½	MEX; 3	ARG; 1	CAN; 1	FRA ½	TRI; 3½	NZL; 1	SCO; 1½
43	Guyana	GUY	27	12	6	0	8	AUT; 1½	FAI ½	AND; 4	SCO; 0	LUX; 1½	MAR; 4	PER ½	URU; 1½	BEL; 2½	GUA; 1	JOR; 2½	BER; 4	DOM; 1	TUN; 2½
44	Japan	JPN	27	16	7	2	5	DEN; 1	ISL; 0	ISV; 2½	TRI; 2	MAU; 1	JOR; 2½	GUA; 2½	HKG ½	ZAI; 4	LBA; 3	LUX; 2	NZL ½	JAM; 2½	PUR; 3
45	Luxembourg	LUX	27	15	6	3	5	BUL; 0	ZAI; 3	NZL ½	JAM; 2	GUY; 2½	FAI; 1	SYR; 1	MAR; 2½	AND; 3	JOR; 2½	JPN; 2	BEL; 1½	SRI; 2	IVB; 3½
46	Faroe Islands	FAI	27	12	5	2	7	MAR; 2	GUY; 3½	AUS ½	PER ½	MAS; 1	LUX; 3	BEL; 2½	ECU; 1½	URU; 2	PUR; 1½	SRI ½	IVB; 4	LBA; 1½	ZAI; 3
47	Belgium	BEL	26½	12	4	4	6	SUI; 1	BOL; 3	SWE ½	WLS ½	MAR; 1½	BER; 3½	FAI; 1½	TRI; 2	GUY; 1½	MAS; 2	JAM; 3	LUX; 2½	HKG; 2	GUA; 2
48	Guatemala	GUA	26½	14	6	2	6	ESP; 0	MAU; 1	LBA; 2½	SRI; 2½	PUR; 1½	TRI; 2½	JPN; 1½	JAM; 2	MAS; 2½	GUY; 3	URU; 1½	INA; 0	UAE; 4	BEL; 2
49	Morocco	MAR	26½	14	6	2	6	FAI; 2	CUB; 0	JAM; 2½	DOM; 1	BEL; 2½	GUY; 0	LBA; 2½	LUX; 1½	BER; 3½	SYR; 1	ZAI; 4	PUR; 2½	BOL; 1½	ECU; 2
50	Tunisia	TUN	26	12	4	4	6	YUG ½	ISV; 3	PER; 2	JOR; 4	BRA; 1	ROM; 0	ECU; 2	BOL; 2½	SYR; 2½	NZL; 1½	CHN; 1½	SRI; 2	URU; 2	GUY; 1½
51	Ecuador	SCU	26	14	5	4	5	ISR; 0	IVB; 3	PUR; 4	VEN; 2	NOR; 1	WLS; 1	TUN; 2	FAI; 2½	SCO; 2½	INA; 2	NZL; 3	MEX; 1	CHN; 0	MAR; 2
52	Bolivia	BOL	26	12	5	2	7	ARG; 1	BEL; 1	SYR; 1½	UAE; 4	URU; 2	DOM ½	MAU; 2½	TUN; 1½	TRI; 2½	HKG; 4	MEX; 1	BRA; 0	MAR; 2½	JAM; 2
53	Trinidad and Tobago	TRI	26	10	3	4	7	MEX; 1	WLS; 1	JOR; 2	JPN; 2	HKG; 1	GUA; 1½	ISV; 3½	BEL; 2	BOL; 1½	DOM; 2	AND; 3½	PER ½	IVB; 3½	SYR; 1
54	Jordan	BOL	26	14	5	4	5	ARG2; 0	JAM; 2	TRI; 2	TUN; 0	BER; 2½	JPN; 1½	IVB; 2½	AND; 2	MAU; 3½	LUX; 1½	GUY; 1½	LBA; 2½	ZAI; 2	ISV; 2½
55	Jamaica	JAM	25½	12	4	4	6	FIN; 0	JOR; 2	MAR; 1½	LUX; 2	ZAI; 3½	HKG; 3	CHI; 0	GUA; 2	SRI; 0	IVB; 3½	BEL; 1	UAE; 3½	JPN; 1½	BOL; 2
56	Puerto Rico	PUR	25	12	6	0	8	ROM; 0	LBA; 3	ECU; 0	ISV; 4	GUA; 2½	PER; 1½	MEX; 1	MAU; 4	VEN ½	FAI; 2½	SYR ½	MAR; 1½	MAS; 3	JPN; 1
57	Malaysia	MAS	25	12	5	2	7	POL ½	SCO ½	SRI; 2	LBA; 3½	FAI; 3	URU; 3	NZL ½	AUT ½	GUA; 1½	BEL; 2	ISV; 3	HKG ½	PUR; 1	UAE; 3½
58	Libya	LBA	23½	10	4	2	8	CAN; 0	PUR; 1	GUA; 1½	MAS ½	ISV; 2	ZAI; 2	MAR; 1½	IVB; 2½	UAE; 3½	JPN; 1	BER; 1½	JOR; 1½	FAI; 2½	AND; 2½
59	Mauritania	MAU	23½	13	5	3	6	VEN; 0	GUA; 3	URU; 0	AND; 2½	JPN; 3	SRI; 2	BOL; 1½	PUR; 0	JOR ½	UAE; 2	IVB; 3	ZAI; 3	ISV; 1	BER; 2
60	Andorra	AND	22½	10	3	4	7	PHI; 2	PAR; 0	GUY; 0	MAU; 1½	SRI ½	IVB; 3	UAE; 3½	JOR; 2	LUX; 1	ZAI; 3	TRI ½	ISV; 2	BER; 2	LBA; 1½
61	United States Virgin Islands	ISV	22	9	3	3	8	AUS ½	TUN; 1	JPN; 1½	PUR; 0	LBA; 2	UAE; 3	TRI ½	ZAI; 2½	IVB; 2	BER; 1½	MAS; 1	AND; 2	MAU; 3	JOR; 1½
62	Bermuda	BER	20½	11	4	3	7	NOR ½	HKG; 0	IVB; 3½	SYR ½	JOR; 1½	BEL ½	ZAI; 2	UAE; 2½	MAR ½	ISV; 2½	LBA; 2½	GUY; 0	AND; 2	MAU; 2
63	Zaire	ZAI	16	5	1	3	10	INA; 0	LUX; 1	UAE; 1	IVB; 3	JAM ½	LBA; 2	BER; 2	ISV; 1½	JPN; 0	AND; 1	MAR; 0	MAU; 1	JOR; 2	FAI; 1
64	United Arab Emirates	UAE	12½	5	2	1	11	COL; 0	DOM ½	ZAI; 3	BOL; 0	IVB; 2½	ISV; 1	AND ½	BER; 1½	LBA ½	MAU; 2	HKG; 0	JAM ½	GUA; 0	MAS ½
65	British Virgin Islands	IVB	12½	1	0	1	13	BRA; 0	ECU; 1	BER ½	ZAI; 1	UAE; 1½	AND; 1	JOR; 1½	LBA; 1½	ISV; 2	JAM ½	MAU; 1	FAI; 0	TRI ½	LUX ½

=== Individual medals ===
- Board 1: (Switzerland) Viktor Korchnoi 9/11 = 81.8%
- Board 2: (Poland) Adam Kuligowski 10/13 = 76.9%
- Board 3: (Bulgaria) Georgi Tringov 8½/11 = 77.3%
- Board 4: (Philippines) Glenn Bordonada 7/9 = 77.8%
- 1st reserve: (United States) James Tarjan 9½/11 = 86.4%
- 2nd reserve: (United States Virgin Islands) John Turner 6½/7 = 92.9%

== Women's event ==
Thirty-two nations took part in the women's Olympiad. From four preliminary groups the teams were split into four finals. In the event of a draw, the tie-break was decided first by match points, then by using the Sonneborn-Berger system.

The Soviet team was back, and led by newly crowned world champion Chiburdanidze they secured the gold medals in a superior display, as well as all four individual board prizes. On the reserve board, Akhmilovskaya won all of her ten games, the only perfect score in Olympiad history. Hungary and West Germany took silver and bronze, respectively.

=== Preliminaries ===
- Group 1:

Final	Country	1	2	3	4	5	6	7	8	+	−	=	Points
«A»	Soviet Union	-	3	2½	3	3	3	3	3	7	0	0	20½
«A»	England	0	-	1½	2½	3	3	3	3	5	1	1	16
«B»	Netherlands	½	1½	-	2½	2	3	2	2½	5	1	1	14
«B»	France	0	½	½	-	½	1½	2	3	2	4	1	8
«C»	Mexico	0	0	1	2½	-	0	2	2	3	4	0	7½
«C»	Finland	0	0	0	1½	3	-	1	2	2	4	1	7½
«D»	Venezuela	0	0	1	1	1	2	-	2½	2	5	0	7½
«D»	New Zealand	0	0	½	0	1	1	½	-	0	7	0	3

- Group 2:

Final	Country	1	2	3	4	5	6	7	8	+	−	=	Points
«A»	Hungary	-	1½	3	2½	3	3	3	3	6	0	1	19
«A»	West Germany	1½	-	3	1½	2	2½	3	2½	5	0	2	16
«B»	United States	0	0	-	2	2½	3	3	3	5	2	0	13½
«B»	Argentina	½	1½	1	-	1	2½	2½	3	3	3	1	12
«C»	Denmark	0	1	½	2	-	2½	2½	2½	4	3	0	11
«C»	Scotland	0	½	0	½	½	-	2½	2	2	5	0	6
«D»	Iceland	0	0	0	½	½	½	-	3	1	6	0	4½
«D»	Monaco	0	½	0	0	½	1	0	-	0	7	0	2

- Group 3:

Final	Country	1	2	3	4	5	6	7	8	+	−	=	Points
«A»	Yugoslavia	-	1½	1½	2	2½	2½	2½	3	5	0	2	15½
«A»	Poland	1½	-	2	2	2½	1½	2	3	5	0	2	14½
«B»	India	1½	1	-	1½	2	1	3	3	3	2	2	13
«B»	Sweden	1	1	1½	-	1½	2½	2	3	3	2	2	12½
«C»	Canada	½	½	1	1½	-	2½	1	2½	2	4	1	10
«C»	Brazil	½	1½	2	½	½	-	1½	3	2	3	2	9½
«D»	Wales	½	1	0	1	2	1½	-	1½	1	4	2	7½
«D»	Bolivia	0	0	0	0	0	0	1½	-	0	6	1	1½

- Group 4:

Final	Country	1	2	3	4	5	6	7	8	+	−	=	Points
«A»	Spain	-	2	1	2	3	2½	3	3	6	1	0	16½
«A»	Bulgaria	1	-	1½	3	3	2½	2½	3	5	1	1	16½
«B»	Romania	2	1½	-	1½	2½	2	3	3	5	0	2	15½
«B»	Australia	1	0	1½	-	3	1½	2½	2½	3	2	2	12
«C»	Colombia	0	0	½	0	-	2	3	2½	3	4	0	8
«C»	Japan	½	½	1	1½	1	-	1	1	0	6	1	6½
«D»	Puerto Rico	0	½	0	½	0	2	-	1½	1	5	1	4½
«D»	Uruguay	0	0	0	½	½	2	1½	-	1	5	1	4½

=== Finals ===
Final A
#	Country	Players	Average rating	Points	MP	S-B
1	Soviet Union	Chiburdanidze, Gaprindashvili, Alexandria, Akhmilovskaya	2370	16		
2	Hungary	Verőci-Petronić, Ivánka, Makai, Kas	2260	11	8	43.00
3	West Germany	Laakmann, Fischdick, Hund, Weichert	2143	11	8	37.50
4	Yugoslavia	Marković, Maček, Pihajlić, Prokopović	2197	11	7	
5	Poland	Ereńska-Radzewska, Szmacińska, Jurczyńska, Wiese	2147	10½		
6	Spain	García Vicente, Ferrer Lucas, García Padrón, Cuevas Rodríguez	2043	8½	6	
7	Bulgaria	Lemachko, Krumova, Shikova, Asenova	2175	8½	4	
8	England	Miles, Jackson, Caldwell, Pritchard	2130	7½		

Final B
#	Country	Players	Average rating	Points	MP
9	Sweden	Borisova, Dahlin, Bengtsson, Cramling	2072	15	13
10	Romania	Polihroniade, Baumstark, Mureșan, Nuțu	2183	15	11
11	Netherlands	van der Mije, Vreeken, van Parreren, Belle	2140	10	
12	Argentina	Soppe, Arias, Justo, Cazón	1953	9½	7
13	France	Merlini, Tagnon, Ruck-Petit, Warkentin	1935	9½	4
14	United States	Savereide, Haring, Herstein, Teasley	2110	9	
15	India	Khadilkar R., Khadilkar J., Khadilkar V.	1800	8½	
16	Australia	Pope, Kellner, McGrath, Depasquale	1975	7½	

Final C
#	Country	Players	Average rating	Points	MP	S-B
17	Denmark	Høiberg, Haahr, Larsen	1967	13	9	42.25
18	Canada	Shterenberg, Day, Baltgailis	1907	13	9	41.25
19	Colombia	Guggenberger, Patiño, Gómez, Zapata	1880	12		
20	Brazil	Cardoso, Simonsen, Assunção, Snitkowsky	1807	11½	9	
21	Finland	Vuorenpää-Landry, Palasto, Pihlajamäki, Ristoja	1893	11½	8	
22	Scotland	Houstoun, Hindle, Elder, McGhee	1813	1		
23	Japan	Watai, Takahashi, Nakagawa, Shibuta	1802	6½		
24	Mexico	Maurá Denis, Camps de Ocampo, Escondrillas, Salazar	1800	5½		

Final D
#	Country	Players	Average rating	Points	MP	S-B
25	Wales	Garwell, Evans, Brunker, Watkins	1880	17½		
26	Iceland	Torsteinsdóttir, Tráinsdóttir, Norðdahl, Samúelsdóttir	1800	13½		
27	Venezuela	García La Rosa, Casique, Arteaga, Niño del Táchira	1800	12		
28	Bolivia	Arias M., Zubieta S., Zubieta A. M., Arias D.	1800	10½	7	34.25
29	Uruguay	De los Santos, Villar de Armas, Ferrari Frei, Fernández Lares	1800	10½	7	26.00
30	New Zealand	Foster, Stretch, Barrowman, Davies	1800	10½	7	25.25
31	Monaco	Fässler, Santoy, Haumeder, Fleureau	1800	5½		
32	Puerto Rico	Castellón de Santana, Rodríguez Ramírez, Paniagua Torres, Landrau Laureano	1800	4		

=== Final «A» ===
No.	Country	1	2	3	4	5	6	7	8	+	−	=	Points
1	Soviet Union	-	1½	2	2	3	3	2½	2	6	0	1	16
2	Hungary	1½	-	1½	2	2	1	1½	1½	2	1	4	11
3	West Germany	1	1½	-	1½	2	1½	1½	2	2	1	4	11
4	Yugoslavia	1	1	1½	-	2	2½	2	1	3	3	1	11
5	Poland	0	1	1	1	-	3	2	2½	3	4	0	10½
6	Spain	1	2	1½	½	0	-	1½	3	2	3	2	8½
7	Bulgaria	½	1½	1½	1	1	1½	-	1½	0	3	4	8½
8	England	1	1½	1	2	½	0	1½	-	1	4	2	7½

=== Final «B» ===
No.	Country	9	10	11	12	13	14	15	16	+	−	=	Points
9	Sweden	-	1½	2	2	2	2½	2	3	6	0	1	15
10	Romania	1½	-	2	3	2	1	2½	3	5	1	1	15
11	Netherlands	1	1	-	1½	2	2	1	1½	2	3	2	10
12	Argentina	1	0	1½	-	2	2	1½	1½	2	2	3	9½
13	France	1	1	1	1	-	2	2½	1	2	5	0	9½
14	United States	½	2	1	1	1	-	1	2½	2	5	0	9
15	India	1	½	2	1½	½	2	-	1	2	4	1	9½
16	Australia	0	0	1½	1½	2	½	2	-	2	3	2	7½

=== Final «C» ===
No.	Country	17	18	19	20	21	22	23	24	+	−	=	Points
17	Denmark	-	2	1½	1½	1	1½	3	2½	3	1	3	13
18	Canada	1	-	2½	1½	3	½	2	2½	4	2	1	13
19	Colombia	1½	½	-	1½	1½	3	2½	1½	2	1	4	12
20	Brazil	1½	1½	1½	-	2	2	1½	1½	2	0	5	11½
21	Finland	2	0	1½	1	-	1½	3	2½	3	2	2	11½
22	Scotland	1½	2½	0	1	1½	-	2	2½	3	2	2	11
23	Japan	0	1	½	1½	0	1	-	2½	1	5	1	6½
24	Mexico	½	½	1½	1½	½	½	½	-	0	5	2	5½

=== Final «D» ===
No.	Country	25	26	27	28	29	30	31	32	+	−	=	Points
25	Wales	-	2	2½	1½	3	2½	3	3	6	0	1	17½
26	Iceland	1	-	2	1	2	2½	2	3	5	2	0	13½
27	Venezuela	½	1	-	2½	1½	2	2½	2	4	2	1	12
28	Bolivia	1½	2	½	-	1	1½	1½	2½	2	2	3	10½
29	Uruguay	0	1	1½	2	-	1	3	2	3	3	1	10½
30	New Zealand	½	½	1	1½	2	-	2	3	3	3	1	10½
31	Monaco	0	1	½	1½	0	1	-	1½	0	5	2	5½
32	Puerto Rico	0	0	1	½	1	0	1½	-	0	6	1	4

=== Individual medals ===
- Board 1: (Soviet Union) Maia Chiburdanidze 9/11 = 81.8%
- Board 2: (Soviet Union) Nona Gaprindashvili 9½/11 = 86.4%
- Board 3: (Soviet Union) Nana Alexandria 8/10 = 80%
- Reserve: (Soviet Union) Elena Akhmilovskaya 10/10 = 100%
