= Ardiansyah =

Indonesian chess grandmaster (1951–2017)

Personal information
- Born: 5 December 1951 Banjarmasin, Indonesia
- Died: 28 October 2017 (aged 65) Jakarta, Indonesia

Chess career
- Country: Indonesia
- Title: Grandmaster (1986)
- Years active: 1969–1996
- Peak rating: 2480 (July 1987)

Ardiansyah (5 December 1951 – 28 October 2017) was an Indonesian chess Grandmaster (GM) (1986) and five-time Indonesian Chess Championship winner (1969, 1970, 1974, 1976, 1988). FIDE rating lists from 1975 to 2017 give his name as "Ardiansyah, H", the H being an abbreviation for the honorific Haji.

== Biography ==
From the end of 1960s to the second half of the 1990s, Ardiansyah was one of Indonesia's leading chess players. He participated many times in Indonesian Chess Championship and won this tournament in 1969, 1970, 1974, 1976, and 1988. In 1969, Ardiansyah participated in World Chess Championship South-East Asian Zonal Tournament in Singapore where he shared 3rd–4th place with Max Arie Wotulo. His best results in other international chess tournaments: Baguio (1980) – shared 3rd–6th place; Surakarta – Denpasar (1982) – shared 10th-14th place; Jakarta (1983 and 1986) – 1st place and shared 1st–2nd place.

Ardiansyah played for Indonesia in the following Chess Olympiads:

- In 1970, at second board in the 19th Chess Olympiad in Siegen (+5, =5, -8),
- In 1972, at second board in the 20th Chess Olympiad in Skopje (+8, =5, -6),
- In 1974, at first board in the 21st Chess Olympiad in Nice (+5, =10, -5),
- In 1978, at second board in the 23rd Chess Olympiad in Buenos Aires (+5, =5, -3),
- In 1980, at fourth board in the 24th Chess Olympiad in La Valletta (+6, =3, -4),
- In 1982, at first board in the 25th Chess Olympiad in Lucerne (+5, =4, -1),
- In 1984, at first board in the 26th Chess Olympiad in Thessaloniki (+6, =4, -4),
- In 1986, at first board in the 27th Chess Olympiad in Dubai (+5, =1, -7),
- In 1988, at first board in the 28th Chess Olympiad in Thessaloniki (+3, =1, -4),
- In 1990, at second board in the 29th Chess Olympiad in Novi Sad (+4, =6, -1),
- In 1996, at first reserve board in the 32nd Chess Olympiad in Yerevan (+2, =0, -3).

Ardiansyah played for Indonesia in the following Men's Asian Team Chess Championships:

- In 1977, at second board in the 2nd Asian Team Chess Championship in Auckland (+6, =1, -1) and won team bronze and individual gold medal,
- In 1979, at fourth board in the 3rd Asian Team Chess Championship in Singapore (+4, =2, -1) and won team and individual bronze medals,
- In 1987, at first board in the 7th Asian Team Chess Championship in Singapore (+3, =0, -4) and won team silver medal,
- In 1989, at second board in the 8th Asian Team Chess Championship in Genting Highlands (+3, =2, -1) and won team silver medal.

In 1969, Ardiansyah was awarded the FIDE International Master (IM) title, and in 1986 he was awarded the FIDE Grandmaster (GM) title.
