= Caroline Bijoux =

South African chess player

Personal information
- Born: 1976 (age 49–50)

Chess career
- Country: South Africa

Caroline Bijoux (born 1976) is a South African chess player.

== Chess career ==
In the early 1990s, Caroline Bijoux was one of the leading South African female chess players. She participated in the World Youth Girl's Chess Championships in the U16 age group (1992), U18 age group (1994) and U20 age group (1995). In 1993, Caroline Bijoux participated in the Women's World Chess Championship Interzonal Tournament in Jakarta where she finished in 39th place.

Since the 2000s she has rarely participated in chess tournaments.
