= Ricardo Grinberg =

Argentine chess player (born 1948)

Personal information
- Born: 14 January 1948 (age 78)

Chess career
- Country: Argentina
- Title: FIDE Master (1984)
- Peak rating: 2460 (January 1975)

Ricardo Grinberg (born 14 January 1948), is an Argentine chess FIDE master (FM).

== Biography ==
In the 1970s, Ricardo Grinberg was one of Argentina's leading chess players. He three times participated in the Argentine Chess Championship finals (1974, 1978, 1985). Her best result in this tournament was shared 4th-5th place with Jaime Emma in 1974. Ricardo Grinberg was participant a number of major International Chess Tournaments in South America.

Ricardo Grinberg played for Argentina in the Chess Olympiad:

- In 1978, at second reserve board in the 23rd Chess Olympiad in Buenos Aires (+4, =1, -3).
