= Herman Suradiradja =

Indonesian chess grandmaster (1947–2016)

Personal information
- Born: 14 October 1947 Sukabumi, Indonesia
- Died: 6 June 2016 (aged 68)

Chess career
- Country: Indonesia
- Title: Grandmaster (1978)
- Peak rating: 2380 (January 1981)

Herman Suradiradja (14 October 1947 – 6 June 2016) was an Indonesian Grandmaster (GM) (1978), and the first Indonesian to hold the title. He won the Indonesian Chess Championship in 1975.

== Biography ==
From the end of 1960s to the second half of the 1990s, Herman Suradiradja was one of Indonesia's leading chess players. He participated many times in Indonesian Chess Championship and won this tournament in 1975. His chess tournament successes include, among others, 2nd place in Lublin (1976), 1st place in Primorsko (1977) and shared 1st–2nd place in Plovdiv (1978).

Herman Suradiradja played for Indonesia in the Chess Olympiads:

- In 1966, at second reserve board in the 17th Chess Olympiad in Havana (+1, =4, -2),
- In 1972, at first reserve board in the 20th Chess Olympiad in Skopje (+3, =4, -3),
- In 1978, at first board in the 23rd Chess Olympiad in Buenos Aires (+2, =7, -3),
- In 1980, at second board in the 24th Chess Olympiad in La Valletta (+4, =5, -2).

Herman Suradiradja played for Indonesia in the Men's Asian Team Chess Championships:

- In 1986, at first board in the 6th Asian Team Chess Championship in Dubai (+5, =2, -2) and won team bronze medal,

In 1976, Herman Suradiradja was awarded the FIDE International Master (IM) title, and later the Grandmaster (GM) title in 1978. He was the first Indonesian chess player in history to receive the grandmaster title. However, he was subsequently unable to perform at grandmaster level, and it was widely reported that he gained his norms by corrupt means.
