= Otto Borik =

German chess player (born 1947)

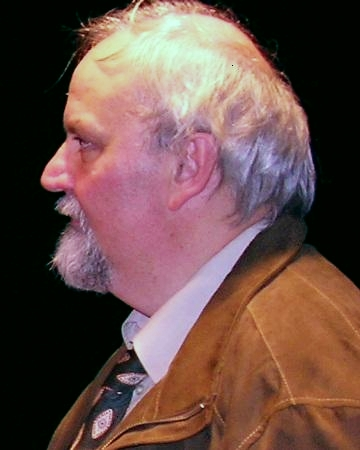
- Otto Borik in 2007

Personal information
- Born: 25 September 1947 (age 78) Prague, Czechoslovakia

Chess career
- Country: Czechoslovakia; Germany
- Title: International Master (1982)
- Peak rating: 2429 (July 2003)

Otakar "Otto" Borik (born 25 September 1947) is a Czech origin German chess International Master (1982).

== Biography ==
Otto Borik spent his youth in his Czech homeland, which at the time was experiencing the Prague Spring. He came to the West Germany and also took German citizenship. Between 1973 and 1984 he lived in Bochum, where he dominated the local chess scene as a member of chess club SG Bochum 31. In 1974 he took part in the Dortmund Chess Days.

In 1973 and 1975 Otto Borik twice won a North Rhine-Westphalia Chess Championship. In 1976 he won West German Blitz Chess Championship. In the same year he took part in West German Chess Championship in Bad Pyrmont and reached 4th place. In 1982 he came in 9th place in Bad Neuenahr-Ahrweiler.

At the Bochum Grandmaster Tournament in 1981, which Lubomir Kavalek won before Vlastimil Hort - both of whom had also emigrated from Czechoslovakia - Otto Borik came in 5th place (with 8 out of 15) and thus achieved his first International Master norm. In the same year he met his second norm in a tournament in Denmark. In 1982, Otto Borik was awarded the FIDE International Master (IM) title.

In the following years Borik became known primarily as an author and also made a name for himself as a chess trainer, for example as a base trainer for the German Chess Federation. He practically gave up his chess career to concentrate on journalism.

Otto Borik played for West Germany in the Chess Olympiads:

- In 1978, at second reserve board in the 23rd Chess Olympiad in Buenos Aires (+2, =2, -3),
- In 1980, at third board in the 24th Chess Olympiad in La Valletta (+4, =2, -4).

Otto Borik played for West Germany in the Nordic Chess Cups:

- In 1977, at third board in the 8th Nordic Chess Cup in Glücksburg (+4, =1, -0) and won team silver and individual gold medals,
- In 1983, at third board in the 9th Nordic Chess Cup in Oslo (+1, =3, -3).

Otto Borik played for West Germany in the Men's Chess Mitropa Cups:

- In 1979, at second board in the 4th Chess Mitropa Cup in Bern (+3, =0, -2) and won team bronze medal,
- In 1981, at first board in the 6th Chess Mitropa Cup in Luxembourg (+0, =4, -1).

Otto Borik played for West Germany in the Clare Benedict Cup:

- In 1979, at second board in the 23rd Clare Benedict Chess Cup in Cleveland (+2, =3, -1) and won team silver medal.

Otto Borik wrote and translated a variety of chess books. These include opening works, the Meyers chess dictionary edited with Joachim Petzold, as well as several books (with Helmut Pfleger as co-author) on the World Chess Championships between 1981 and 1990, which were published by Falken-Verlag. His main achievement, however, is the chess magazine Schach-Magazin 64, which he founded in 1979. Borik has been editor-in-chief of the chess magazine for three decades, which was published every two weeks until the end of 2006 and is now published monthly.

== Literature ==
- Schach-Olympiade: Buenos Aires '78, Rau, Düsseldorf 1979. ISBN 3-7919-0191-5.
- Eröffnungen, halboffene Spiele, 3rd edition, Beyer Verlag, Hollfeld 1983. ISBN 3-921202-70-1.
- (with Vlastimil Hort) Moderne Verteidigung, 2nd edition, Beyer Verlag, Hollfeld 1984. ISBN 3-88805-053-7.
- Budapester Gambit (2nd edition), Edition Mädler im Rau Verlag, Düsseldorf o. J. (1988). ISBN 3-7919-0221-0.
- Kasparows Schacheröffnungen (2nd edition), Edition Olms, Zürich 1992. ISBN 3-283-00319-X.
- (with Joachim Petzold) Meyers Schachlexikon. Meyers Lexikonverlag, Mannheim 1993. ISBN 3-411-08811-7.
