= Sean Winshand Cuhendi =

Indonesian chess grandmaster (born 1997)

Personal information
- Born: November 5, 1997 (age 28)

Chess career
- Country: Indonesia
- Title: Grandmaster (2025)
- FIDE rating: 2509 (July 2026)
- Peak rating: 2509 (August 2025)

Sean Winshand Cuhendi is an Indonesian chess grandmaster. He won the 2015 Indonesian Chess Championship.

== Chess career ==
In April 2014, he won the First Saturday GM tournament in Budapest, earning an IM norm.

He achieved his GM norms at the:

- Japfa Grandmaster Tournament in April 2015
- GM turnaj o Pohar primatora Dunajskej Stredy in July 2017
- Memorijal Bogoljuba Dankovica in November 2017

In July 2025, he surpassed the 2500 rating mark after winning the Nusantara Grandmaster Tournament, making him the 9th Indonesian player to achieve the Grandmaster title.
