= Béla Berger =

Hungarian-Australian chess player

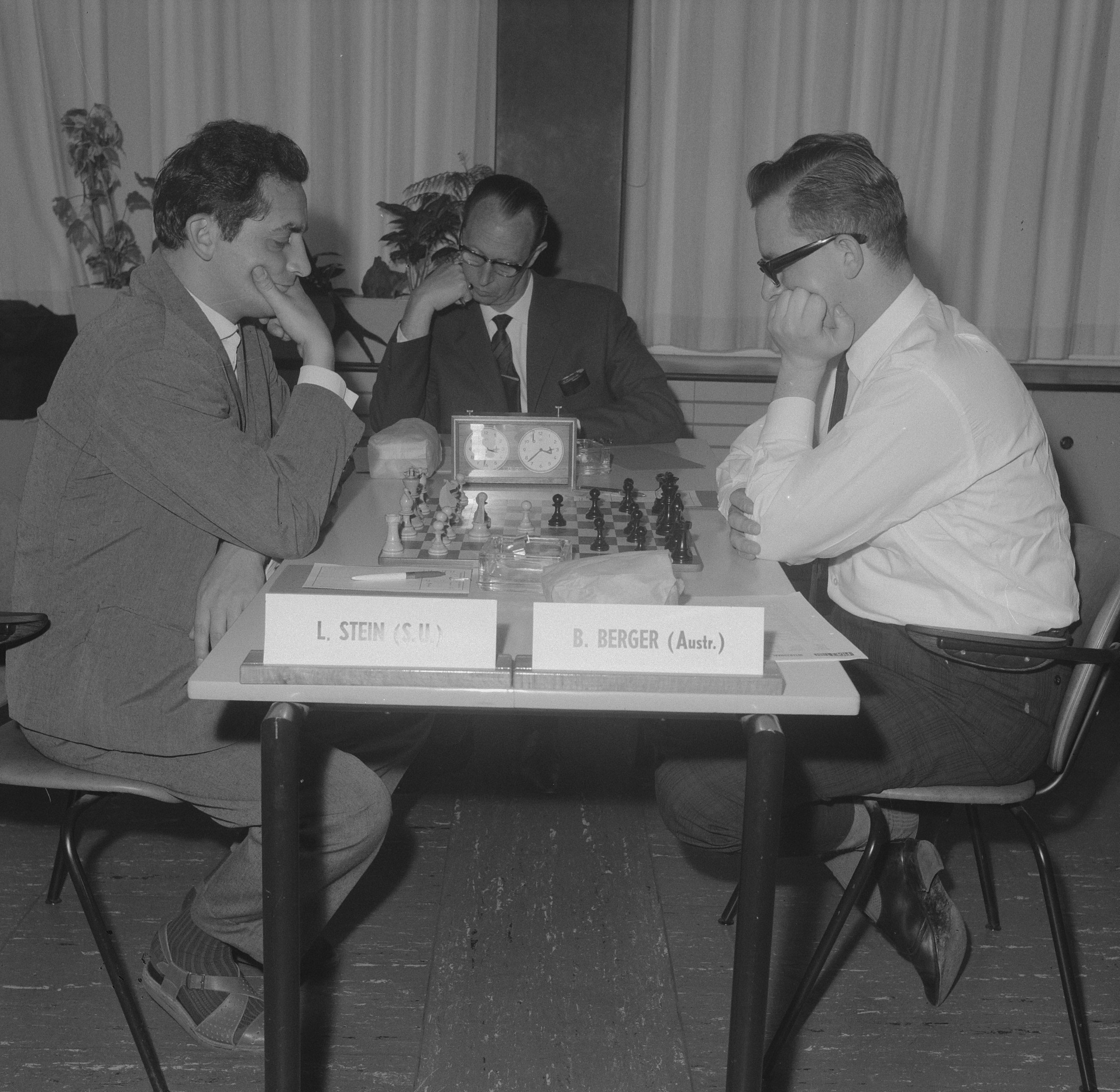
Leonid Stein vs. Béla Berger (1964)

Béla Berger (12 August 1931, Szombathely, Hungary – December 2005, Sydney, Australia) was a Hungarian-Australian chess master.

He took 5th in the Hungarian Championship at Budapest 1953 (Béla Sándor won). In 1954, he played for Hungary "B" at fourth board in 1st Triennial Cup in Budapest.

After the failure of the Hungarian Revolution of 1956, Berger emigrated from Hungary to Australia.

In Australia, he twice won the New South Wales state title (1957 and 1961), and came second in the 1959 Australian Chess Championship behind Lajos Steiner.

Berger was one of Australia's representatives at the 1963 Pacific Zone 10 Championship in Jakarta. National champion John Purdy was chosen first, and a quadrangular tournament was held for the second spot. Berger and Karlis Ozols tied for first; then the selectors voted in favour of Berger 3–0.

The Jakarta result was Berger's best of his career. He tied for first on 5.5/8, and then won the playoff against Indonesia's Arovah Bachtiar. (He won the playoff 2–1 after 3 games; a fourth game was won by Bachtiar, but it had no bearing on the outcome, as the tiebreak system used favoured Berger). The win gave him the title of International Master, and qualified him for the Interzonal of the 1964-66 World Championship cycle.

Berger was one of only three Australians to ever qualify for an Interzonal, the others being Steiner and Ian Rogers. At the Interzonal he came 23rd out of 24.

Berger tied for 7-8th at Manila 1968 (Meralco Open, Svetozar Gligorić won). While Berger retired from chess competition relatively early, He came out of retirement in 1991 to play an exhibition game against Charles Pizzato - a chess prodigy.

== See also ==
- List of Eastern Bloc defectors
