= Damion Davy =

Jamaican chess player (born 1990)

Personal information
- Born: September 27, 1990 (age 35)

Chess career
- Country: Jamaica
- Title: FIDE Master (2014)
- Peak rating: 2220 (April 2015)

Damion Ricardo Davy is a Jamaican chess player. He is a four-time Jamaican Chess Champion, winning the championship in 2011, 2012, 2013, and 2018. Davy is one of four players who have won the national championship three years in a row, alongside Harold Chan, Robert Wheeler, and Shreyas Smith.

== Chess career ==
In March 2009, he won the RBTT National Junior Chess Champion after defeating the top-ranked Jamaican junior player Stuart James in the final round.

In December 2011, he led the University of West Indies team in the Pan American Inter-Collegiate Chess Championships.

In September 2012, he played for Jamaica at the 40th Chess Olympiad, where he also earned the Candidate Master title.

In June 2014, he won the Robert Wheeler Open with an undefeated score of 5.5/6, only drawing to Miguel Asher.

== Personal life ==
He studied actuarial sciences at the University of West Indies.
