= Lindri Juni Wijayanti =

Indonesian chess player (born 1963)

Personal information
- Born: 16 June 1963 (age 63)

Chess career
- Country: Indonesia
- Title: Woman International Master (1993)

Lindri Juni Wijayanti (born 16 June 1963) is an Indonesian chess player who holds the FIDE title of Woman International Master (WIM, 1993). She is a four-time Indonesian Women's Chess Championship winner (1984, 1988, 1990, 1991). In the 1980s, she was Indonesian number one female chess player.

== Biography ==
She won the Indonesian Women's Chess Championship: in 1984, 1988, 1990 and 1991. In 1993, Lindri Juni Wijayanti participated in Women's World Chess Championship Interzonal Tournament in Jakarta where ranked 33rd place.

Lindri Juni Wijayanti played for Indonesia in the Women's Chess Olympiads:

- In 1982, at second board in the 10th Chess Olympiad (women) in Lucerne (+7, =5, -2),
- In 1984, at first board in the 26th Chess Olympiad (women) in Thessaloniki (+2, =4, -5),
- In 1986, at first board in the 27th Chess Olympiad (women) in Dubai (+1, =4, -7),
- In 1988, at first board in the 28th Chess Olympiad (women) in Thessaloniki (+3, =2, -5),
- In 1990, at first board in the 29th Chess Olympiad (women) in Novi Sad (+3, =4, -6),
- In 1992, at second board in the 30th Chess Olympiad (women) in Manila (+8, =2, -3) and won individual silver medal,
- In 1994, at first reserve board in the 31st Chess Olympiad (women) in Moscow (+3, =4, -3),
- In 1996, at first reserve board in the 32nd Chess Olympiad (women) in Yerevan (+1, =0, -3).

In 1993, she awarded the FIDE Woman International Master (WIM) title.
