= Maria Lucia Ratna Sulistya =

Indonesian chess player (born 1975)

Personal information
- Born: 14 January 1975 (age 51)

Chess career
- Country: Indonesia
- Title: Woman International Master (1993)
- FIDE rating: 2225 (July 1998)
- Peak rating: 2260 (July 1997)

Maria Lucia Ratna Sulistya (born 14 January 1975), also known as Maria Lucia Ratna or Maria Lucia Sulistya, is an Indonesian chess player. She received the FIDE title of Woman International Master (WIM) in 1993 and is a two-time Indonesian Women's Chess Championship winner (1993, 1995).

== Biography ==
In 1992, in Buenos Aires, Sulistya won the bronze medal at the World Girl's Junior Championship in U20 age group. She twice won Indonesian Women's Chess Championship: in 1993 and 1995. In 1993, Sulistya participated in Women's World Chess Championship Interzonal Tournament in Jakarta where she ranked 29th place. She represented Indonesia at the Women's Asian Team Chess Championship in 1995. In 1998, in Kuala Lumpur she shared 10th place in the Asian Women's Chess Championship.

Sulistya played for Indonesia in the Women's Chess Olympiads:

- In 1990, at third board in the 29th Chess Olympiad (women) in Novi Sad (+6, =3, -4),
- In 1992, at third board in the 30th Chess Olympiad (women) in Manila (+6, =5, -3),
- In 1994, at third board in the 31st Chess Olympiad (women) in Moscow (+5, =3, -4),
- In 1996, at first board in the 32nd Chess Olympiad (women) in Yerevan (+5, =6, -2).
