= Shreyas Smith =

Jamaican chess player (born 1996)

Personal information
- Born: December 18, 1996 (age 29)

Chess career
- Country: Jamaica
- Title: FIDE Master (2018)
- Peak rating: 2272 (March 2026)

Shreyas Smith is a Jamaican chess player. He is a seven-time Jamaican Chess Champion, winning the championship in 2017, 2019, 2020, 2022, 2024, 2025 and 2026.

== Chess career ==
In May 2016, he won the Robert Wheeler Chess Open by defeating Malaku Lorne in the final round.

In August 2018, he won the M.R. Games Chess Open at the University of the West Indies, defeating Warren Elliott, Malik Curriah, Malaku Lorne, and Akeem Brown on tiebreaks.

In October 2022, he won the Premier Category of the XVIII Andres Clemente Vazquez International Chess Tournament ahead of Jesus Jerzy Leiva Perez and Alejandro Michel Perez Diaz.

In December 2022, he won the NM Thomas Figueroa Memorial Blitz Chess Championship with a score of 10.5/11.
