= Yuliya Levitan =

American chess player (born 1973)

Personal information
- Born: 12 June 1973 (age 53) Minsk, Byelorussian SSR, Soviet Union

Chess career
- Country: Soviet Union (until 1991); United States (since 1991)
- Title: Woman International Master (1992)
- FIDE rating: 2220 (July 1997)
- Peak rating: 2280 (July 1992)

Yuliya Levitan (born 12 June 1973) is an American chess player who holds the FIDE title of Woman International Master (WIM, 1992).

== Biography ==
In 1989, Levitan won the USSR Girl's Chess Championship in the U16 age group. She represented the Soviet Union in 1990 in the U18 Girls World Championship in Singapore where shared 4th-6th place. In 1991, Levitan moved to the United States. In 1992, she shared the 3rd-4th place in U.S. Women's Chess Championship and shared first place with Irina Levitina at the International Women's Chess tournament in New York. In 1993, Levitan participated in Women's World Chess Championship Interzonal Tournament in Jakarta where ranked 25th place.

Levitan played for United States in the Women's Chess Olympiad:

- In 1992, at first reserve board in the 30th Chess Olympiad (women) in Manila (+5, =3, -2).

In 1992, she was awarded the FIDE Woman International Master (WIM) title. In 2014, Levitan became an Association of Chess Professionals Board Member.

Levitan holds a degree in finance and international business from New York University and a J.D. degree from Brooklyn Law School. She was admitted to the New York State Bar Association in 2006. She works as federal litigation attorney for the United States Department of Housing and Urban Development.

== Literature ==
- Игорь Бердичевский. Шахматная еврейская энциклопедия. Москва: Русский шахматный дом, 2016 (Igor Berdichevsky. The Chess Jewish Encyclopedia. Moscow: Russian Chess House, 2016) ISBN 978-5-94693-503-6
