= Velichka Krumova =

Bulgarian chess player

Personal information
- Born: 1942 (age 83–84)

Chess career
- Country: Bulgaria
- Peak rating: 2115 (July 1987)

Velichka Krumova (Bulgarian: Величка Крумова; born 1942) is a Bulgarian chess player.

== Biography ==
In the end of 1970s, Velichka Krumova was one of the leading Bulgarian women's chess players. She has participated in many Bulgarian Women's Chess Championship. In 1978, in Bydgoszcz Velichka Krumova shared 4th place in International Women's Chess tournament.

Velichka Krumova played for Bulgaria in the Women's Chess Olympiad:

- In 1978, at second board in the 8th Chess Olympiad (women) in Buenos Aires (+3, =7, -1).

In 2010s, Velichka Krumova continued to participate in senior chess tournaments.
