= Viktoria Johansson =

Swedish chess player (born 1974)

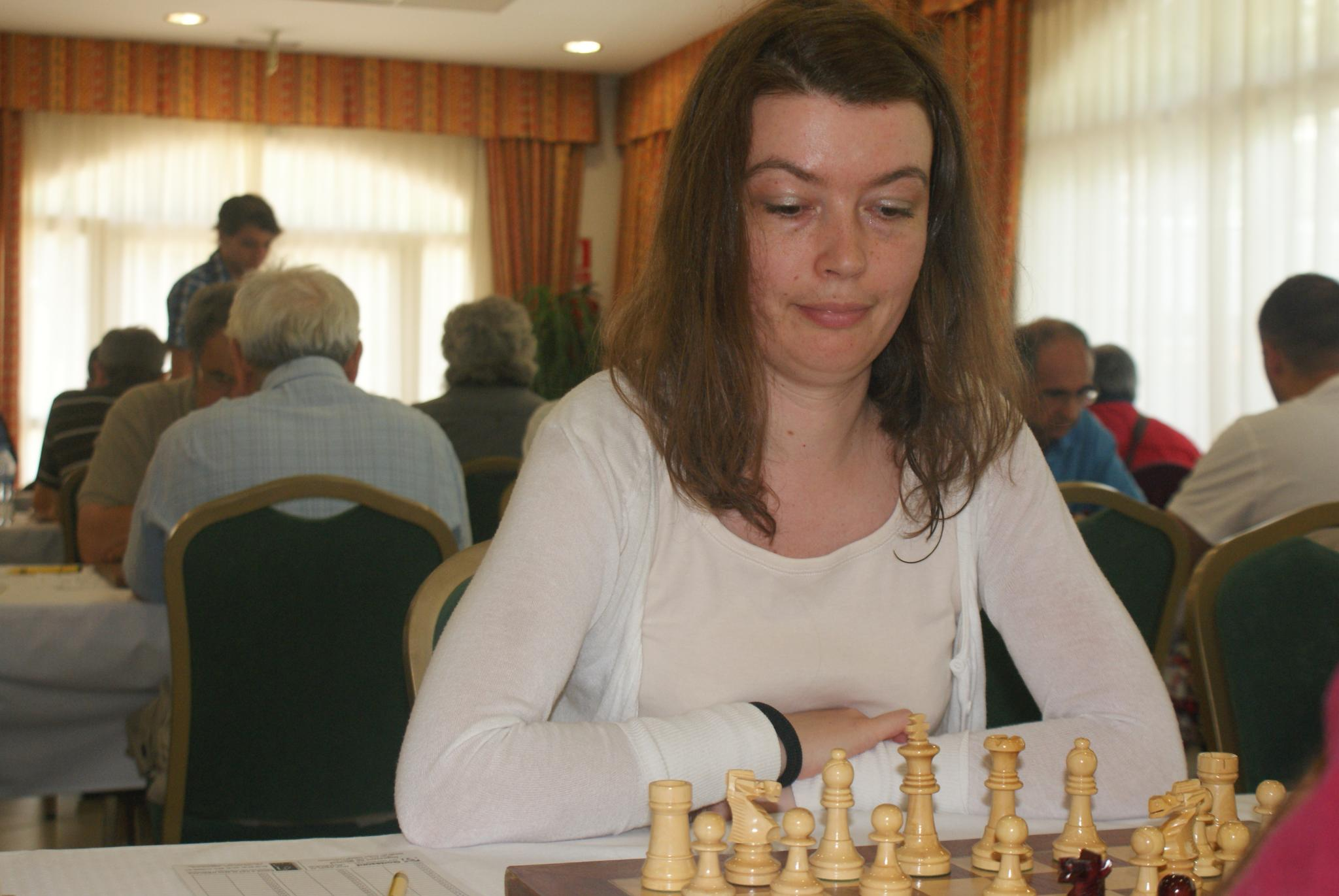
- Johansson at the 2012 Andorra Open

Personal information
- Born: 12 March 1974 (age 52)

Chess career
- Country: Sweden
- Title: Woman International Master (1993)
- FIDE rating: 2041 (September 2021)
- Peak rating: 2242 (October 2005)

Viktoria Johansson (born 12 March 1974) is a Swedish chess player who holds the FIDE title of Woman International Master (WIM, 1993).

== Biography ==
Johansson represented Sweden in European Youth Chess Championships and World Youth Chess Championships where best result achieved in 1991 in World Girl's Junior Chess Championship, when ranked 6th place. In 1993, in Helsinki she overtaken Ingrid Dahl and Johanna Paasikangas-Tella in Women's World Chess Championship Zonal Tournament playoff and won the right to play in an Interzonal Tournament. In 1993, Johansson participated in Women's World Chess Championship Interzonal Tournament in Jakarta where ranked 35th place.

She played for Sweden in the Women's Chess Olympiads:

- In 1990, at second board in the 29th Chess Olympiad (women) in Novi Sad (+7, =4, -1) and won individual silver medal,
- In 1992, at first board in the 30th Chess Olympiad (women) in Manila (+6, =3, -4),
- In 1996, at first board in the 32nd Chess Olympiad (women) in Yerevan (+5, =2, -4),
- In 1998, at first board in the 33rd Chess Olympiad (women) in Elista (+2, =4, -4),
- In 2000, at third board in the 34th Chess Olympiad (women) in Istanbul (+3, =2, -5),
- In 2002, at second board in the 35th Chess Olympiad (women) in Bled (+4, =1, -5),
- In 2004, at third board in the 36th Chess Olympiad (women) in Calvià (+3, =5, -3),
- In 2006, at first board in the 37th Chess Olympiad (women) in Turin (+4, =3, -4),
- In 2012, at second board in the 40th Chess Olympiad (women) in Istanbul (+3, =2, -4).

Johansson played for Sweden in the European Team Chess Championships:

- In 1992, at first board in the 1st European Team Chess Championship (women) in Debrecen (+2, =0, -4),
- In 1997, at first board in the 2nd European Team Chess Championship (women) in Pula (+2, =0, -4),
- In 2001, at first reserve board in the 4th European Team Chess Championship (women) in León (+3, =0, -3),
- In 2005, at third board in the 6th European Team Chess Championship (women) in Gothenburg (+2, =4, -2),
- In 2007, at third board in the 7th European Team Chess Championship (women) in Heraklion (+2, =0, -4).

In 1993, she awarded the FIDE Woman International Master (WIM) title.
