= Cerdas Barus =

Indonesian chess grandmaster (born 1961)

Personal information
- Born: 1 January 1961 (age 65) Karo, North Sumatra, Indonesia

Chess career
- Country: Indonesia
- Title: Grandmaster (2003)
- Peak rating: 2503 (January 2003)

Cerdas Barus (born 1 January 1961 in Karo, North Sumatra) is an Indonesian deaf chess grandmaster (2004).

He has won the Indonesian Chess Championship three times. In 2002, he came second at Surabaya. In 2011 he won the Telin Chess International Tournament in Jakarta. In December 2015 he participated at the Penang Open tournament in Malaysia with 119 players; he became shared 11th with 6 points out of 9 rounds.

He played for Indonesia in the Chess Olympiads of 1984, 1988, 1990, 1994, 1996, 2000 and 2002 (individual gold medal at third board).
