= Raúl Monier =

Argentine chess player

Personal information
- Born: 7 May 1960 (age 66)

Chess career
- Country: Argentina
- Title: FIDE Master (1985)
- FIDE rating: 2401 (July 2026)
- Peak rating: 2423 (October 2003)

Raúl Monier (born 7 May 1960), is an Argentine chess FIDE Master (FM) (1985).

== Biography ==
From the end of 1970s to the begin to 1980s Raúl Monier was one of Argentina's leading chess players. In 1983, he participated in the Argentine Chess Championship final and shared 3rd-5th place. Raúl Monier twice participated in American Continental Chess Championships (2003, 2005).

Raúl Monier played for Argentina and Argentina B team in the Chess Olympiads:

- In 1978, at second reserve board in the 23rd Chess Olympiad in Buenos Aires (+4, =5, -1),
- In 1984, at second reserve board in the 26th Chess Olympiad in Thessaloniki (+3, =7, -1).

Raúl Monier played for Argentina in the World Youth U26 Team Chess Championship:

- In 1981, at fourth board in the 3rd World Youth U26 Team Chess Championship in Graz (+4, =3, -2).
