= Julia Tverskaya =

American chess player

Personal information
- Born: 19 September 1959 (age 66) Moscow, Russian SSR, Soviet Union

Chess career
- Country: United States (since 1991); Soviet Union (before 1991)
- Title: Woman International Master (1992)

Julia Tverskaya (born 19 September 1959) is a Russian-born American chess player who holds the FIDE title of Woman International Master (WIM, 1992).

== Biography ==
Tverskaya graduated from the Moscow State University Faculty of Philology. She participated in the Moscow Women's Chess Championship finals, which ranked 10th place in 1983 and 11th place in 1988. In 1991, Tverskaya moved to the United States. She has taken part in the U.S. Women's Chess Championships four times, showing the best result in 1992 when she shared the 3rd-4th place. In 1993, she participated in Women's World Chess Championship Interzonal Tournament in Jakarta where ranked 37th place.

Tverskaya played for United States in the Women's Chess Olympiad:

- In 1994, at third board in the 31st Chess Olympiad (women) in Moscow (+5, =2, -5).

In 1992, she received the FIDE Woman International Master (WIM) title.

== Literature ==
- Игорь Бердичевский. Шахматная еврейская энциклопедия. Москва: Русский шахматный дом, 2016 (Igor Berdichevsky. The Chess Jewish Encyclopedia. Moscow: Russian Chess House, 2016) ISBN 978-5-94693-503-6
