= Jomo Pitterson =

Jamaican chess player (born 1974)

Personal information
- Born: November 7, 1974 (age 51)

Chess career
- Country: Jamaica
- Title: International Master (2010)
- Peak rating: 2263 (November 2010)

Jomo Pitterson is a Jamaican chess player. He is a three-time Jamaican Chess Champion, winning the championship in 1992, 1993, and 1999. Pitterson is one of two International Masters in Jamaica, alongside Shane Matthews.

== Chess career ==
Pitterson vs. Šebenik, Istanbul 2012

Position: d8 black knight, b7 black bishop, c7 black bishop, g7 black king, h7 black pawn, b6 white pawn, c5 black pawn, a4 white queen, c4 white pawn, e4 white pawn, f4 black pawn, f3 white pawn, g2 white pawn, h2 black pawn, h1 white king

Final position

In July 2010, he became Jamaica's first International Master after winning the Sub-zonal Regional Chess Championships.

In October 2010, he was nominated for the Courtney Walsh Award for Excellence for finishing as the top player from the region in the 39th Chess Olympiad.

In August 2012, he played on board 2 for Jamaica at the 40th Chess Olympiad, where he defeated grandmaster Matej Šebenik in the first round.

In March 2021, he was appointed to the FIDE Athletes Commission, after previously serving as the treasurer of the Jamaican Chess Federation.

He serves as a team coach for the Jamaican national team.
