= Sheldon Wong =

Jamaican chess player (1960–2025)

Personal information
- Born: 13 July 1960 Spanish Town, Jamaica
- Died: 18 December 2025 (aged 65) Orlando, Florida

Chess career
- Country: Jamaica
- Title: National Master (Jamaica and United States)

Sheldon M. A. Wong (13 July 1960 – 18 December 2025) was a Jamaican chess player. He held the National Master titles of both Jamaica and the United States.

== Chess ==
In 1976, the 16-year-old Wong won the Jamaican Chess Championship and became the country's youngest National Master. That same year he represented Jamaica at the World Student Team Championship in Caracas, scoring 3½/8. In late 1976 and early 1977 he played for Jamaica at the World Junior Chess Championship in Groningen, where he was awarded a brilliancy prize for his win against the Israeli junior champion Nir Grinberg. After winning his first three games to co-lead the tournament, he suffered five consecutive losses, eventually finishing with 5½/13. He won the Jamaican championship again in 1977, and represented Jamaica at both the World Student Team Championship in Mexico City, where he scored 7/13, and the 1978 Chess Olympiad in Buenos Aires, where he scored 7½/14.

He later moved to the United States, where he gained the National Master title in 1992.
