= Andrew Mellace =

Jamaican chess player (born 1977)

Personal information
- Born: 1977 (age 48–49)

Chess career
- Country: Jamaica
- Title: Candidate Master (2018)
- Peak rating: 2116 (August 2016)

Andrew Mellace is a Jamaican chess player. He has represented Jamaica in the Chess Olympiads of 2012 and 2014.

== Chess career ==
In October 2011, he won the Jamaica Chess Open with a score of 5/6.

In June 2012, he won the Jamaican Chess Championship alongside Damion Davy.

In December 2013, he tied for first place with Damion Davy in the Frederick Cameron Chess Open with a score of 5/6.

In June 2016, he finished in third place in the championship to determine the Jamaican team for the 42nd Chess Olympiad, but was excluded from the team. He protested his exclusion to the federation's president Ian Wilkinson and later stated that he had retired from competitive chess due to the selection process for the Olympiad team.
