= Jaden Shaw =

Jamaican chess player (born 2007)

Personal information
- Born: May 16, 2007 (age 19) Saint Andrew Parish, Jamaica

Chess career
- Country: Jamaica
- Title: FIDE Master (2023)
- Peak rating: 2151 (October 2026)

Jaden Shaw is a Jamaican chess player. He was the Jamaican Chess Champion in 2023.

== Chess career ==
In April 2021, he won the Jamaica Chess Federation Open Satellite Chess Tournament, which allowed him to advance to the preliminary stage of the American qualifier for the Chess World Cup 2021.

In August 2022, he played for Jamaica at the 44th Chess Olympiad. He became known for offering a draw against grandmaster Meelis Kanep, who had fainted and was rushed to the hospital during their game. The team ultimately recorded 5 wins, 5 losses, and one draw at the end of the tournament, finishing 85th after being seeded 108th.

In April 2023, he was given the 2022 Prime Minister's National Youth Awards for Excellence in sports after becoming Jamaica's youngest national chess champion. He achieved a score of 10/11 in the tournament.
