= Adrienn Csőke =

Hungarian chess player (born 1973)

Personal information
- Born: 23 February 1973 (age 53)

Chess career
- Country: Hungary
- Title: Woman International Master (1993)
- Peak rating: 2235 (July 1991)

Adrienn Csőke (born 23 February 1973) is a Hungarian chess player who holds the FIDE title of Woman International Master (WIM, 1993).

== Biography ==
Csőke represented Hungary in European Youth Chess Championships and World Youth Chess Championships. In 1991, in 9th World Girls' Junior Chess Championship she ranked 5th place. In 1993, in 11th World Girls' Junior Chess Championship she ranked 6th place. In 1993, Adrienn Csőke participated in Women's World Chess Championship Interzonal Tournament in Jakarta where she ranked 24th place.

She played for team Hungary-3 in the European Team Chess Championship:

- In 1992, at first reserve board in the 1st European Team Chess Championship (women) in Debrecen (+1, =3, -1).

In 1993, Csőke was awarded the FIDE Woman International Master (WIM) title.
