= Indonesian Chess Championship =

The Indonesian Chess Championship is organized by PERCASI (Indonesian: Persatuan Catur Seluruh Indonesia), the Indonesian Chess Federation. PERCASI was established in 1948 in Yogyakarta, although its official founding date is August 17, 1950, when its statutes and bylaws were enacted. Its offices were moved to Jakarta in 1955.

The first Indonesian championship recognized by PERCASI was held in Solo in 1953, although there are claims of a national championship having taken place in Semarang in 1952. Ardiansyah holds the record for most championships won with five. Since 1978, a women's championship has been held concurrently with the open championship.

== Open championship winners ==
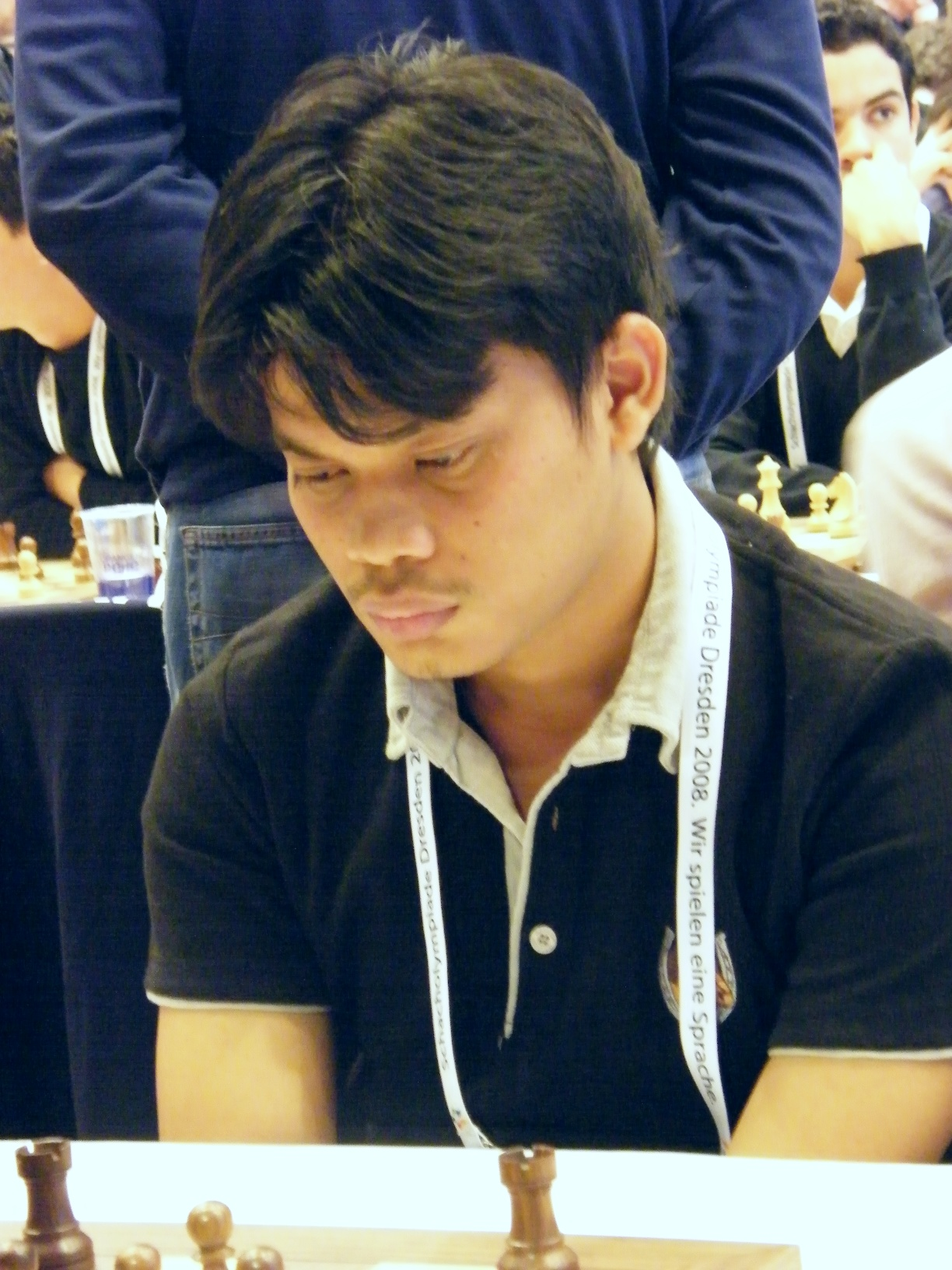
Susanto Megaranto, four-time Indonesian champion from 2006 to 2010

	Year	Place	Champion
1	1953	Solo	Arovah Bachtiar
2	1954	Tegal	Baris Hutagalung
3	1955	Jakarta	Baris Hutagalung
4	1956	Magelang	Abubakar Baswedan
5	1958	Malang	cancelled
6	1960	Medan	Baris Hutagalung
7	1962	Jakarta	Arovah Bachtiar
8	1964–1965	Jakarta/Bandung	Ong Yok Hwa
9	1967	Jakarta	Arovah Bachtiar
10	1969	Banjarmasin	Ardiansyah
11	1970	Jakarta	Ardiansyah
12	1971	Padang	Arovah Bachtiar
13	1972	Jakarta	Jacobus Sawandar Sampouw
14	1973	Denpasar	Johny Suwuh
15	1974	Malang	Ardiansyah
16	1975	Medan	Herman Suradiradja
17	1976	Jakarta	Ardiansyah
18	1978	Yogyakarta/Jakarta	Edhi Handoko
19	1979–1980	Cipayung/Jakarta	Edhi Handoko
20	1980	Salatiga	Sutan Aritonang
21	1982	Bandung	Utut Adianto
22	1984	Jakarta	Edhi Handoko
23	1986	Mataram/Jakarta	Salor Sitanggang
24	1987	Palu	Cerdas Barus
25	1988	Salatiga	Ardiansyah
26	1990	Banjarmasin	Nasib Ginting
27	1991	Ujung Pandang	Edhi Handoko
28	1992	Jakarta	Utut Adianto
29	1993	Bandung	Salor Sitanggang
30	1994	Yogyakarta	Nasib Ginting
31	1995	Palangkaraya	Awam Wahono
32	1997	Banda Aceh	Suyud Hartoyo
33	1999	Bekasi	Cerdas Barus
34	2001	Denpasar	Irwanto Sadikin
35	2002	Palembang	Cerdas Barus
36	2003	Semarang	Junaid Pamungkas
37	2005	Tarakan	Irwanto Sadikin
38	2006	Batam	Susanto Megaranto
39	2007	Surabaya	Susanto Megaranto
40	2009	Palangkaraya	Susanto Megaranto
41	2010	Manado	Susanto Megaranto
42	2011	Palembang	Salor Sitanggang
43	2013	Jakarta	Pitra Andika
44	2014	Makassar	Tirta Chandra Purnama
45	2015	Jakarta	Sean Winshand Cuhendi
46	2017	Bogor	Novendra Priasmoro
47	2018	Banda Aceh	Mohamad Ervan
48	2019	Ambon	Muhamad Agus Kurniawan

== Women's championship winners ==
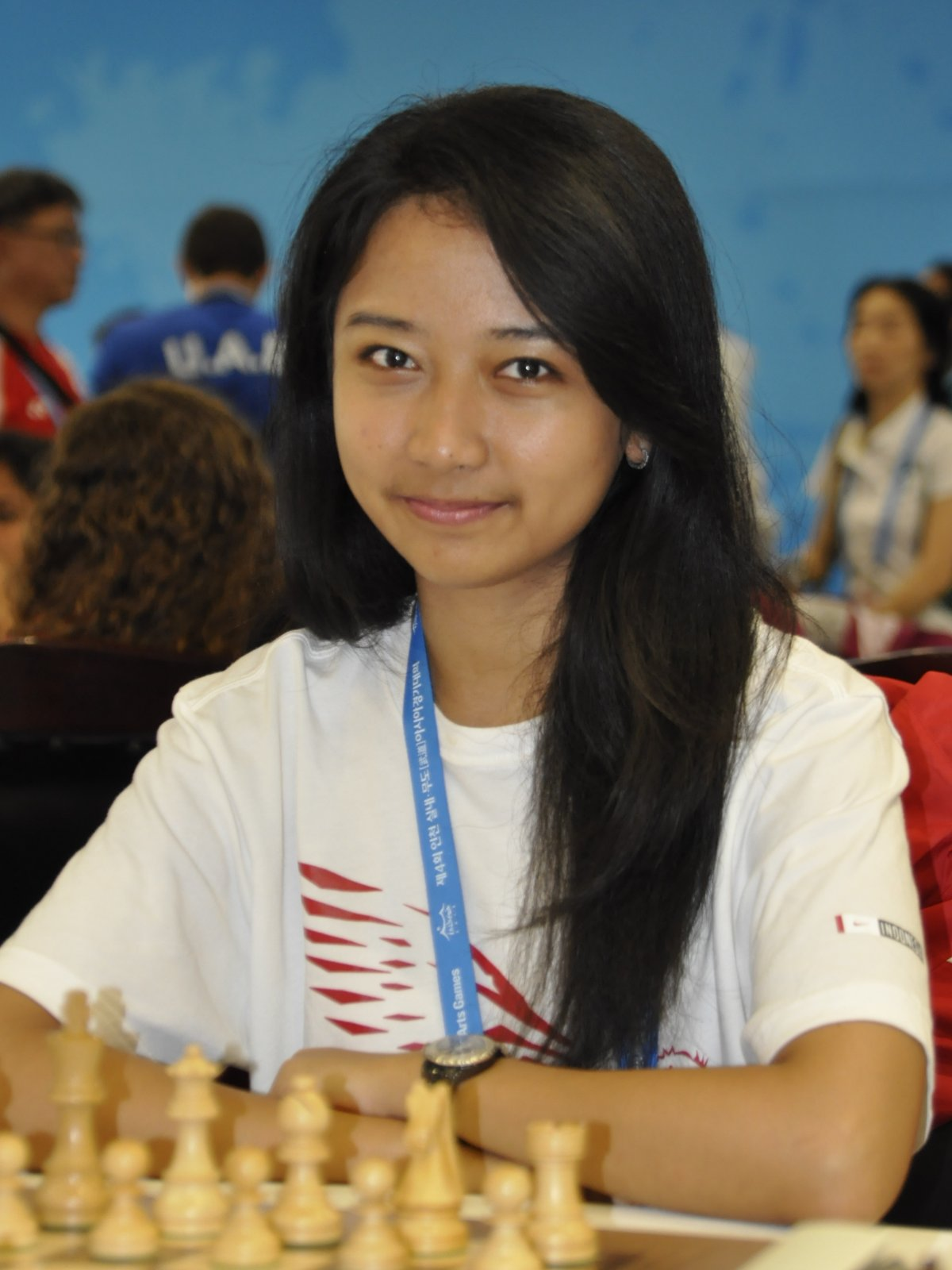
Irene Kharisma Sukandar, four-time Indonesian women's champion from 2006 to 2010

	Year	Place	Champion
1	1978	Yogyakarta	Hanik Maria
2	1979	Cipayung	Imasniti
3	1980	Salatiga	Darmayanti Tamin
4	1982	Bandung	Darmayanti Tamin
5	1984	Jakarta	Lindri Juni Wijayanti
6	1986	Mataram	Darmayanti Tamin
7	1987	Palu	Betty Makalew
8	1988	Salatiga	Lindri Juni Wijayanti
9	1990	Banjarmasin	Lindri Juni Wijayanti
10	1991	Ujung Pandang	Lindri Juni Wijayanti
11	1992	Jakarta	Suzana Widiastuti
12	1993	Bandung	Maria Lucia Ratnasari Sulistya
13	1994	Yogyakarta	Lisa Karlina Lumongdong
14	1995	Palangkaraya	Maria Lucia Ratnasari Sulistya
15	1997	Banda Aceh	Elizabeth Musung
16	1999	Bekasi	Ai Zakiah
17	2001	Denpasar	Ai Zakiah
18	2002	Palembang	Evi Lindiawati
19	2003	Semarang	Susianah Handayani
20	2005	Tarakan	Lisa Karlina Lumongdong
21	2006	Batam	Irene Kharisma Sukandar
22	2007	Surabaya	Irene Kharisma Sukandar
23	2009	Palangkaraya	Irene Kharisma Sukandar
24	2010	Manado	Irene Kharisma Sukandar
25	2011	Palembang	Yemi Jelsen
26	2013	Jakarta	Baiq Vina Lestari
27	2014	Makassar	Medina Warda Aulia
28	2015	Jakarta	Chelsie Monica Ignesias Sihite
29	2017	Bogor	Aay Aisyah Anisah
30	2018	Banda Aceh	Ummi Fisabilillah
31	2019	Ambon	Fariha Mariroh
