= Sergio Carlos Giardelli =

Argentine chess player

Personal information
- Born: 27 June 1955
- Died: 23 August 2015 (aged 60)

Chess career
- Country: Argentina
- Title: International Master (IM) (1988)

Sergio Carlos Giardelli (27 June 1955 – 23 August 2015), was an Argentine chess International Master (IM) (1988), four-time Argentine Chess Championship silver medalist (1989, 1992, 1994, 2003).

== Biography ==
From the mid-1970s to begin 2000s, Sergio Carlos Giardelli was one of Argentina's leading chess players. In 1974, in Manila he participated in World Junior Chess Championship and shared 6th–7th place.

From 1978 to 2005 he often participated in the Argentine Chess Championship finals and won five medals: four silver (1989, 1992, 1994, 2003) and bronze (1993).

Sergio Carlos Giardelli five time participated in World Chess Championships Zonal tournaments: 1982, 1987, 1989, 1993, and 2003. He was participant in a number of strong international chess tournaments. Sergio Carlos Giardelli won Mar del Plata Open Chess Tournament (1992) and International Chess Tournament in Buenos Aires (2003).

Sergio Carlos Giardelli played for Argentina and Argentina B teams in the Chess Olympiads:

- In 1978, at first board in the 23rd Chess Olympiad in Buenos Aires (+2, =2, -8),
- In 1980, at first reserve board in the 24th Chess Olympiad in La Valletta (+7, =1, -4).

In 1988, Sergio Carlos Giardelli was awarded the FIDE International Master (IM) title.
