= Warren Elliott =

Jamaican chess player (born 1979)

Personal information
- Born: August 2, 1979 (age 46)

Chess career
- Country: Jamaica
- Title: FIDE Master
- FIDE rating: 2218 (November 2018)
- Peak rating: 2286 (July 2006)

Warren Elliott (born August 2, 1979) is an eight-time National Chess Champion of Jamaica. He has won the most National Chess Championships in Jamaica and is the only player to win with a perfect score. He has represented Jamaica in eight Chess Olympiads (Elista, Russia 1998, Istanbul, Turkey 2000, Bled, Slovenia 2002, Turin, Italy 2006, Dresden, Germany 2008, Khanty-Mansiysk, Russia 2010, Istanbul, Turkey 2012 and Baku, Azerbaijan 2016) He was the Technical Director/Coach of Jamaica's 2014 chess Olympiad Team in Tromso, Norway. He was the number one ranked player in Jamaica for a number of years but he is now a retired player more focused on the next generation. He is one of only nine FIDE Masters (an international chess title) in the country. He obtained the rank of FIDE Master in the 2.3.5 Subzonal chess tournament in Venezuela.
