= Nikolai Krogius =

Russian chess grandmaster (1930–2022)

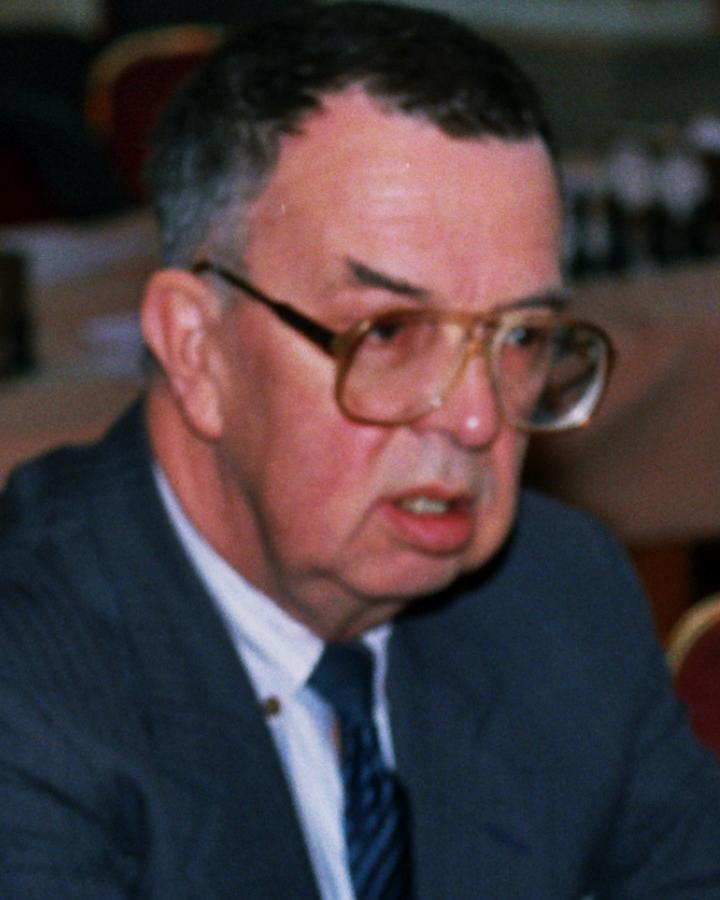
- Krogius in 1995, Bad Liebenzell

Personal information
- Born: Nikolai Vladimirovich Krogius; 22 July 1930 Saratov, Russian SFSR, Soviet Union
- Died: 14 July 2022 (aged 91) New York City, U.S.

Chess career
- Country: Soviet Union → Russia
- Title: Grandmaster (1964)
- Peak rating: 2575 (July 1971)

Nikolai Vladimirovich Krogius (Russian: Николай Владимирович Крогиус; 22 July 1930 – 14 July 2022) was a Russian chess grandmaster, International Arbiter (1985), psychologist, chess coach, chess administrator, and author. He won several tournament titles at Sochi and in Eastern European events, and appeared in seven Soviet finals from 1958–71. His peak was in 1967 when he ranked 18th in the world for a time. He earned his doctorate in psychology, and specialized in sports psychology. He coached World Champion Boris Spassky for several years, also served as chairman of the USSR Chess Federation, and co-authored five chess books. He was the co-winner of the 1993 World Senior Chess Championship.

== Early years ==
Nikolai V. Krogius scored 4.5/15 for a tied 13th–14th place at Leningrad 1946 in the Soviet Junior Championship; the winner was Tigran Petrosian. Krogius made his first creditable result in Master company at Leningrad 1949, tallying 8/17 for a tied 12th–15th in a very good field; this was a Soviet Championship semi-final, and he did not advance to the final. He also missed advancing from the Soviet semi-final at Leningrad 1951, although complete results from this are unavailable. He competed in three Russian Championships: at Yaroslavl 1951, in his home town of Saratov in 1953, and at Rostov-on-Don in 1954, but complete results of these events are also unavailable.

Krogius was selected for the Soviet team for Oslo 1954, the World Student Olympiad, where he scored 7.5/9 (+7 =1 -1) on board three, and won team silver. At Leningrad 1955–56, a Soviet semi-final, Krogius scored 9/18 for a tied 11th–14th place in an excellent field. He was gradually working his way up through the deep Soviet chess hierarchy. In the Soviet semi-final at Tbilisi 1956, he scored 11/19 for seventh place, and missed advancing to the final by half a point.

== First Soviet final ==
Krogius qualified for his first Soviet final by scoring 11.5/19, for a tied 5th–7th place, in the semi-final at Leningrad 1957. The final was at Riga 1958, URS-ch25, and he debuted strongly with 9.5/18 and a tied 9th–11th place; the winner was Mikhail Tal. Although he did not as yet earn an international title for this, it showed that he was of at least International Master standard by this time, because of the immense strength of the Soviet finals. He made his first appearances for the USSR in team matches against Bulgaria (Sofia 1957) and Yugoslavia (Zagreb 1958), scoring 50 percent in both. At Tbilisi for URS-ch26, he scored just 6.5/19 for 18th place; the winner was Petrosian. He improved at Leningrad for URS-ch27, scoring 10/19 for a tied 9th–10th place, as Viktor Korchnoi won.

Krogius earned his first international opportunity for Varna 1960, where he tied for 1st–2nd with Nikola Padevsky on 8/12. At Yerevan for URS-ch30, he scored 8.5/19 for 11th place, as Korchnoi won again. He scored 6.5/11 for a tied 3rd–4th place at Sochi 1963, as Lev Polugaevsky won. Krogius earned his International Master title in 1963.

== Grandmaster ==
Krogius scored his most impressive triumph with clear first at the Chigorin Memorial in Sochi 1964 on 11/15. This earned him the Grandmaster title later that year. At Kyiv 1964–65 for URS-ch32, he scored 10.5/19 for a tied 8th–9th place; Korchnoi won again. Krogius was fifth at Sochi 1965 with 8.5/15; the winners were Boris Spassky and Wolfgang Unzicker. He was selected for the USSR team for Hamburg 1965, the European Team Championships, where he played on board nine, scored 4.5/8 (+2 =5 -1), won the gold medal on his board, and was part of the gold-medal winning team. He was 4th at Budapest 1965 with 10/15, as Lev Polugaevsky, László Szabó, and Mark Taimanov shared first place.

In URS-ch34 at Tbilisi 1966, Krogius scored 11/20 for 8th place, as Leonid Stein won. A sure sign of favour in high circles was his first trip to Western Europe for an individual tournament, Le Havre 1966, which celebrated the 900th anniversary of the voyage which led to the Norman Conquest of England. Since the Soviet Chess Federation controlled all foreign invitations, opportunities outside the Soviet bloc were highly sought, and many players with better results, such as Ratmir Kholmov, never received one during their prime years. Krogius performed well with a shared 2nd–3rd place on 7/11; the winner was Bent Larsen.

Krogius scored 10/15 at Sochi 1966 for a shared 3rd–4th place, as Korchnoi won. He made one of his top career results with a shared 1st–5th place at Sochi 1967 on 10/15; the other co-winners were Boris Spassky, Alexander Zaitsev, Leonid Shamkovich, and Vladimir Simagin. At Sarajevo 1967, Krogius scored 9.5/15 for a shared 3rd–4th place; the winners were Anatoly Lein and Dragoljub Ciric.

Krogius scored his career peak rating around this time. Chessmetrics.com ranks him at 2686 in September 1967, good for #18 in the world, and he ranked 17th in the world from January to March 1968. Sochi 1964 was a 2703 performance, as was Sochi 1966. Krogius shared 2nd–3rd places at Polanica-Zdrój 1969 with 9.5/15; László Bárczay won. Krogius won at Varna 1969 ahead of Vlastimil Hort.

== Coaches the World Champion ==
Krogius earned his doctorate in psychology and specialized in sports psychology. He served as part of Boris Spassky's team for his second world title match against Tigran Petrosian at Moscow 1969, where Spassky won a tight struggle. For the 1972 World Championship in Reykjavík, Krogius was again selected to assist Spassky prepare for what is referred to as the Match of the Century against Bobby Fischer. In a conversation at the event, Fischer quoted Krogius' observation that "[m]istakes are often made when a player persists in his delusions", to which Krogius replied: "Perhaps this thought guided you when you were preparing for the match? We saw a completely new Fischer in Reykjavik, very different from the old one." The match was won 12½ to 8½ by Fischer.

Krogius himself was still keeping up an active and successful tournament schedule during these years. He tied 2nd–5th places at Hastings 1969–70 with 5/9, behind winner Lajos Portisch. He placed 2nd in the Russian Championship at Kuibyshev 1970, behind winner Anatoly Karpov. At Leningrad for URS-ch39, his last Soviet final, he scored 10.5/21 for a tied 10th–11th place, as Vladimir Savon won. Krogius placed tied 3rd–4th at Sochi 1973 with 9/15 as Mikhail Tal won. Overall, he tallied 67/135 in his seven Soviet finals, from 1958 to 1971, for just under 50 percent, and had six solid appearances out of seven, with only 1959 being much below standard.

== Later years ==
Krogius scaled back his tournament play by the mid-1970s, playing only in occasional lower-level events. He began important contributions as a chess author, eventually writing or co-writing five chess books. He moved into chess administration as well. He was the captain of the USSR team for the USSR vs. Rest of the World match at London 1984. He served as President of the USSR Chess Federation, and was the head of delegation for Anatoly Karpov's team for the 1990 title match against Garry Kasparov at New York City and Lyon, where Kasparov won narrowly.

Krogius returned to high-class tournament play at the Senior level in the 1990s. In the 1991 World Senior Championship at Bad Woerishofen, he scored 8/11 to tie for 3rd–6th places. He tied for the title at the World Senior Championship at Bad Wildbad 1993, with 8.5/11, along with Lein, Taimanov, Bukhuti Gurgenidze, and Boris Arkhangelsky. Krogius stayed fairly active in tournament play until 1998, mostly at the Senior level.

== Personal life ==
Krogius was born in Saratov on 22 July 1930. He was married to Irina and they had two daughters. He died in New York City on 14 July 2022 at the age of 91.

== Legacy ==
Krogius was somewhat of a late bloomer by Soviet standards, although this was not that uncommon for players who lived through the Second World War during their formative chess years; other examples are Efim Geller and Semyon Furman, both of whom eventually became formidable players by their late 20s. Krogius had several failed attempts at reaching the Soviet final, and did not make his first one until age 27. His graduate studies were the priority until he finished his doctorate. However, when he did get opportunities at high level, he usually made the most of them, and scored several notable tournament victories in high-standard events during his peak years in the 1960s. He was a middle-range player at the perilous Soviet finals level. Krogius is a very interesting and unusual figure in chess history, since he chose the career of a professional sports psychologist, concentrating on chess, and may have been the first to follow this precise path. In his role as coach, he was undoubtedly an important part of Boris Spassky's team for the world title matches of 1969 and 1972, and maintained a successful tournament program himself during this period. His own playing style was often highly tactical in nature, and he defeated many acknowledged masters of tactical play. By his mid-40s, Krogius appeared less frequently in major events, and moved on to writing and chess administration, also with notable success. He returned to the board after age 60, with some impressive results in Senior events.

== Notable chess games ==
- Nikolai Krogius vs Leonid Shamkovich, Russian Championship, Yaroslavl 1951, Blumenfeld Gambit (E10), 1-0 It's a sharp game between two rising young Masters.
- Nikolai Krogius vs Efim Geller, USSR 1955, Sicilian Defence, Dragon Variation (B76), 1-0 Geller was never afraid of a theoretical duel, but here he meets his match.
- Nikolai Krogius vs Viktor Korchnoi, USSR Championship semi-final, Tbilisi 1956, French Defence, Tarrasch Variation (C05), 1-0 These two contemporaries would be destined to meet many more times, and Korchnoi gradually established superiority, but not on this day.
- Mark Taimanov vs Nikolai Krogius, USSR Championship, Riga 1958, Modern Defence, Averbakh Variation (A42), 0–1 Here Krogius, normally a model of probity in the opening, takes up a rare sharp variation with success.
- Paul Keres vs Nikolai Krogius, USSR Championship, Tbilisi 1959, Sicilian Defence, Taimanov Variation (B48), 0-1 Keres would finish second in the World Championship Candidates' tournament a few months later.
- Nikolai Krogius vs David Bronstein, Tbilisi 1967, Modern Defence, Gurgenidze Variation (B06), 1-0 Bronstein is known for his sharp, creative play, but he has to concede here.
- Nikolai Krogius vs Raymond Keene, Hastings 1970–71, King's Indian Defence, Fianchetto Variation (E67), 1-0 Keene was one of the best of the rising British generation.
- Yuri Balashov vs Nikolai Krogius, USSR Team Championship, Riga 1975, Sicilian Defence, Richter-Rauzer Variation (B63), 0-1 Another young Master has to tilt his King to the older chess sage.

== Writings ==
- Notes on the endgame, by Nikolai Krogius, 1973.
- Krogius, Nikolaĭ Vladimirovich (1976). Psychology in chess. New York: R.H.M. Press. ISBN 0-273-01485-4. OCLC 16499565.
- Marshall-Angriff, by Nikolai Krogius and Andrei Matsukevich, Sportverlag Berlin, 1989 (German).
- Schach fur Aufsteiger. 33 Lektionen, by Nikolai Krogius, 1997 (German).
- Alburt, Lev; Krogius, Nikolai (2005), Just the Facts!: Winning Endgame Knowledge in One Volume (second ed.), Chess Information and Research Center (distributed by W. W. Norton), ISBN 1-889323-15-2
