= World Chess Championship 1969 =

Chess match between Tigran Petrosian and Boris Spassky

	Defending champion	Challenger
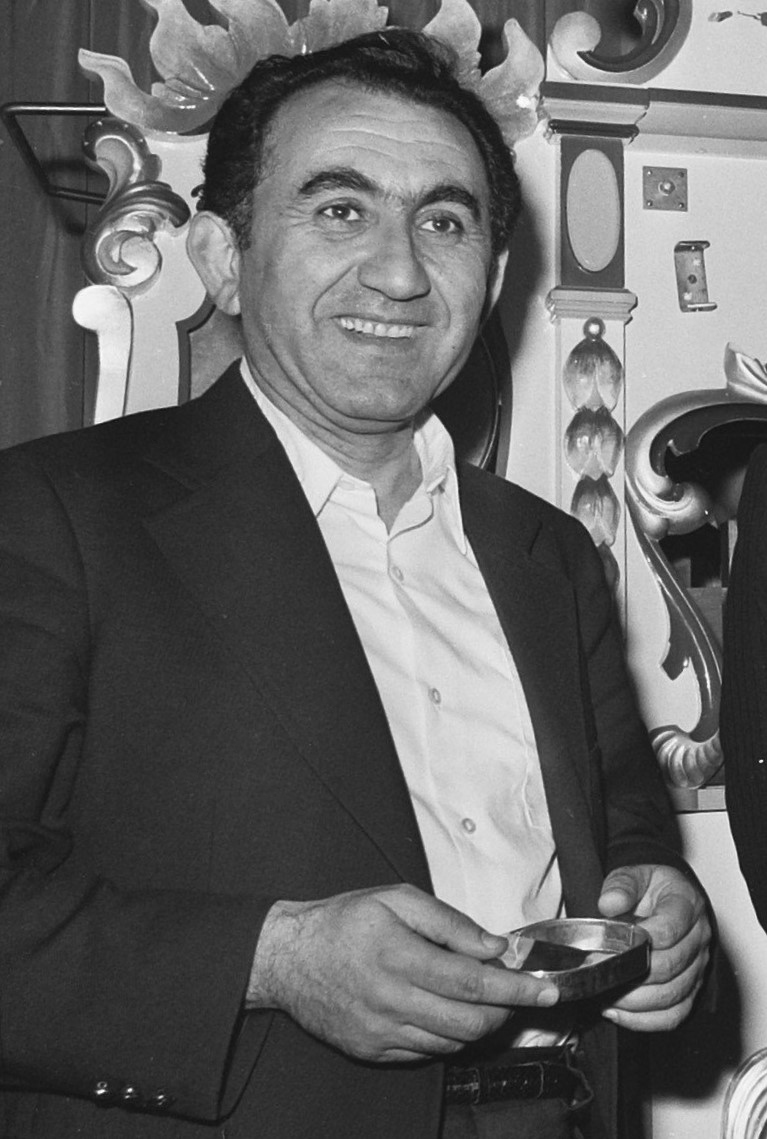
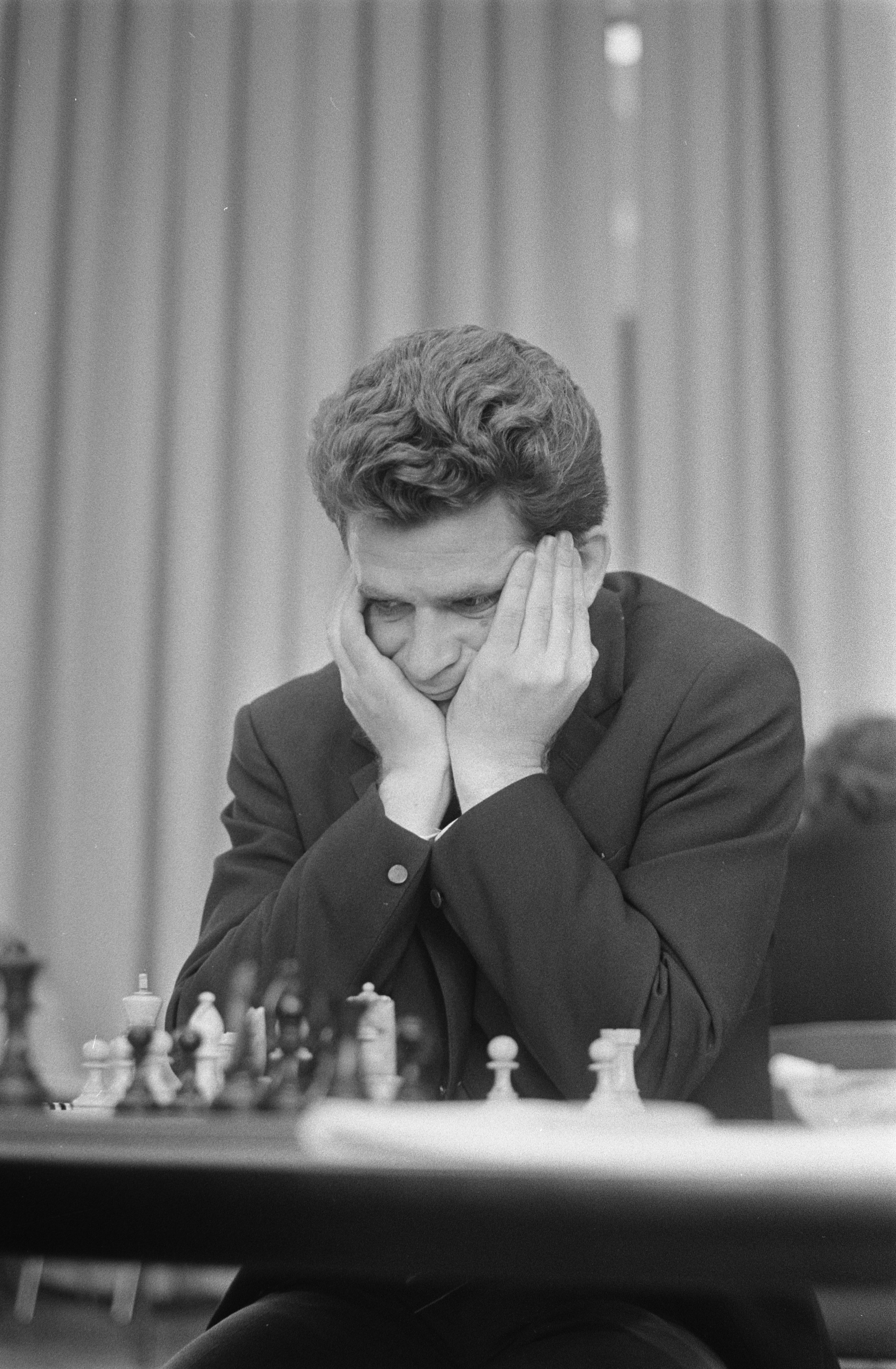
	Tigran Petrosian	Boris Spassky
	(Soviet Union) Tigran Petrosian	(Soviet Union) Boris Spassky
10½	Scores	12½
	Born 17 June 1929; 39 years old	Born 30 January 1937; 32 years old
	Winner of the 1966 World Chess Championship	Winner of the 1968 Candidates Tournament

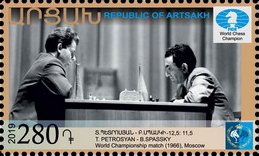
World Chess Championship 1969 on a 2019 stamp of Artsakh

The 1969 World Chess Championship was played between Tigran Petrosian and Boris Spassky in Moscow from April 14 to June 17, 1969. This was the second consecutive time Petrosian and Spassky played for the world title. Spassky reversed the previous result; winning the world title and becoming the tenth World Chess Champion.

== 1967 Interzonal ==
The 1967 Interzonal Tournament was played in Sousse, Tunisia, in October and November. The first six placegetters qualified for the Candidates, along with Boris Spassky and Mikhail Tal who were seeded into the Candidates matches as finalists of the previous tournament.

A major controversy occurred when Bobby Fischer, who was leading the tournament with seven wins and three draws in ten rounds, abandoned the event over a dispute with the organisers. Because Fischer withdrew before he had played half his games, the results of his games were not included in his opponents' totals.

Bent Larsen went on to win, with Korchnoi, Geller, Gligorić, and Portisch taking the next four places.

There was a three-way tie for sixth place among Samuel Reshevsky, Vlastimil Hort, and Leonid Stein, who played a round-robin playoff to determine the final place in the Candidates matches. In the event of a tie, the player with the best Sonneborn–Berger tie break from the Interzonal would qualify. The playoff ended in a three-way tie, so Reshevsky qualified.

1967 Sousse Interzonal Tournament
		1	2	3	4	5	6	7	8	9	10	11	12	13	14	15	16	17	18	19	20	21	22	Total	Tie break
1	Bent Larsen (Denmark)	-	0	½	½	0	1	1	1	1	½	1	1	1	½	0	1	½	1	1	1	1	1	15½	
2	Viktor Korchnoi (Soviet Union)	1	-	½	½	1	½	½	½	0	½	0	0	½	1	1	1	1	1	1	1	½	1	14	136.00
3	Efim Geller (Soviet Union)	½	½	-	½	½	0	1	½	1	½	½	1	½	½	1	½	½	1	½	1	1	1	14	135.75
4	Svetozar Gligorić (Yugoslavia)	½	½	½	-	½	½	½	1	½	½	½	½	½	1	1	½	½	½	1	1	1	1	14	135.00
5	Lajos Portisch (Hungary)	1	0	½	½	-	½	½	1	0	½	½	½	½	1	1	½	1	½	½	1	1	1	13½	
6	Samuel Reshevsky (United States)	0	½	1	½	½	-	½	½	1	½	½	1	½	½	½	½	1	1	0	1	1	½	13	129.75
7	Vlastimil Hort (Czechoslovakia)	0	½	0	½	½	½	-	1	½	½	1	½	½	½	½	½	½	1	1	1	1	1	13	120.25
8	Leonid Stein (Soviet Union)	0	½	½	0	0	½	0	-	½	½	½	1	1	½	1	1	1	1	1	1	1	½	13	117.00
9	Milan Matulović (Yugoslavia)	0	1	0	½	1	0	½	½	-	0	1	1	½	1	0	½	½	1	1	½	1	1	12½	
10	Aleksandar Matanović (Yugoslavia)	½	½	½	½	½	½	½	½	1	-	½	1	½	½	½	½	1	½	0	1	½	½	12	
11	Borislav Ivkov (Yugoslavia)	0	1	½	½	½	½	0	½	0	½	-	0	½	½	1	½	1	½	1	0	1	1	11	103.50
12	Henrique Mecking (Brazil)	0	1	0	½	½	0	½	0	0	0	1	-	1	1	1	½	½	½	1	½	1	½	11	102.50
13	Aivars Gipslis (Soviet Union)	0	½	½	½	½	½	½	0	½	½	½	0	-	½	0	1	½	0	1	½	1	1	10	93.75
14	Lubomir Kavalek (Czechoslovakia)	½	0	½	0	0	½	½	½	0	½	½	0	½	-	½	1	½	1	0	1	1	1	10	90.00
15	Duncan Suttles (Canada)	1	0	0	0	0	½	½	0	1	½	0	0	1	½	-	½	1	0	½	1	½	1	9½	
16	István Bilek (Hungary)	0	0	½	½	½	½	½	0	½	½	½	½	0	0	½	-	½	½	1	0	1	1	9	
17	László Barczay (Hungary)	½	0	½	½	0	0	½	0	½	0	0	½	½	½	0	½	-	½	1	½	½	1	8	
18	Robert Byrne (United States)	0	0	0	½	½	0	0	0	0	½	½	½	1	0	1	½	½	-	1	½	½	0	7½	
19	Miguel Cuéllar (Colombia)	0	0	½	0	½	1	0	0	0	1	0	0	0	1	½	0	0	0	-	0	1	1	6½	61.00
20	Lhamsuren Myagmarsuren (Mongolia)	0	0	0	0	0	0	0	0	½	0	1	½	½	0	0	1	½	½	1	-	0	1	6½	54.50
21	Ortvin Sarapu (New Zealand)	0	½	0	0	0	0	0	0	0	½	0	0	0	0	½	0	½	½	0	1	-	½	4	
22	Slim Bouaziz (Tunisia)	0	0	0	0	0	½	0	½	0	½	0	½	0	0	0	0	0	1	0	0	½	-	3½	

1968 Los Angeles playoff
		1	2	3	Total
1	Samuel Reshevsky (United States)	-	====	====	4
2	Vlastimil Hort (Czechoslovakia)	====	-	=0=1	4
3	Leonid Stein (Soviet Union)	====	=1=0	-	4

== 1968 Candidates matches ==
Spassky won the Candidates Tournament – as he did in the 1966 cycle – earning the right to challenge Petrosian for the World Championship a second time.

Quarterfinals
Sukhumi, June 1968
(Soviet Union) Boris Spassky	5½
(Soviet Union) Efim Geller	2½
Porec, May 1968
(Hungary) Lajos Portisch	4½
(Denmark) Bent Larsen	5½
Belgrade, Apr–May 1968
(Socialist Federal Republic of Yugoslavia) Svetozar Gligorić	3½
(Soviet Union) Mikhail Tal	5½
Amsterdam, May 1968
(United States) Samuel Reshevsky	2½
(Soviet Union) Viktor Korchnoi	5½

Semifinals
Malmö, July 1968
(Soviet Union) Boris Spassky	5½
(Denmark) Bent Larsen	2½
Moscow, June–July 1968
(Soviet Union) Mikhail Tal	4½
(Soviet Union) Viktor Korchnoi	5½

Final
Kiev, Sep 1968
(Soviet Union) Boris Spassky	6½
(Soviet Union) Viktor Korchnoi	3½
Third place
(Denmark) Bent Larsen	5½
(Soviet Union) Mikhail Tal	2½

Larsen and Tal contested a third place playoff in the Dutch town of Eersel in March 1969, which Larsen won 5½–2½.

== 1969 Championship match ==
The match was played as best of 24 games. If it ended 12–12, Petrosian, the title holder, would retain the Championship.

World Chess Championship Match 1969
	1	2	3	4	5	6	7	8	9	10	11	12	13	14	15	16	17	18	19	20	21	22	23	Points
Boris Spassky (Soviet Union)	0	½	½	1	1	½	½	1	½	0	0	½	½	½	½	½	1	½	1	0	1	½	½	12½
Tigran Petrosian (Soviet Union)	1	½	½	0	0	½	½	0	½	1	1	½	½	½	½	½	0	½	0	1	0	½	½	10½

Spassky won.
