= 1963 USSR Chess Championship =

Soviet chess tournament

31st Soviet Chess Championship (1963)
- Location: Leningrad

Champion
- Leonid Stein

The 1963 Soviet Chess Championship was the 31st edition of USSR Chess Championship. Held from 23 November to 27 December 1963 in Leningrad. The tournament was won by Leonid Stein. The final were preceded by semifinals events at Almaty, Kharkov, Moscow and Sverdlovsk.

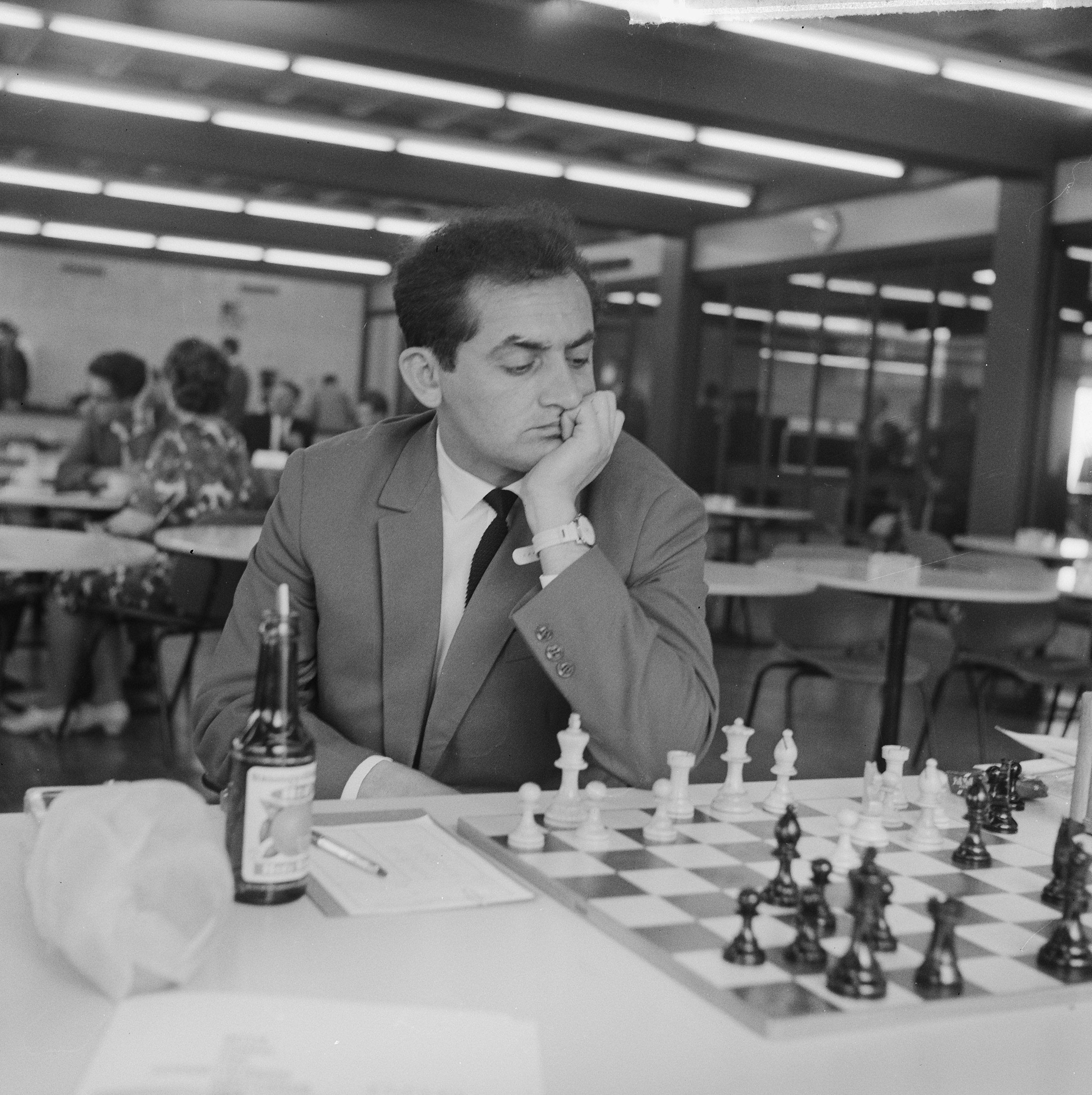
Leonid Stein

== Table and results ==
31st Soviet Chess Championship
	Player	1	2	3	4	5	6	7	8	9	10	11	12	13	14	15	16	17	18	19	20	Total
1	(Soviet Union) Leonid Stein	-	½	1	½	½	½	½	½	½	½	0	1	½	½	1	1	½	½	1	1	12
2	(Soviet Union) Boris Spassky	½	-	½	½	½	½	1	½	½	½	1	½	½	½	½	1	½	½	1	1	12
3	(Soviet Union) Ratmir Kholmov	0	½	-	1	½	½	½	½	1	½	½	½	1	1	½	1	1	½	½	½	12
4	(Soviet Union) Alexey Suetin	½	½	0	-	½	1	0	1	½	0	1	½	½	1	1	½	0	1	1	1	11½
5	(Soviet Union) Efim Geller	½	½	½	½	-	½	½	0	½	½	1	½	½	1	½	½	1	1	½	1	11½
6	(Soviet Union) David Bronstein	½	½	½	0	½	-	0	½	1	½	0	1	1	1	½	½	½	1	1	1	11½
7	(Soviet Union) Eduard Gufeld	½	0	½	1	½	1	-	½	0	½	½	½	1	1	½	0	1	½	1	½	11
8	(Soviet Union) Lev Polugaevsky	½	½	½	0	1	½	½	-	½	0	½	1	½	½	½	1	½	1	½	1	11
9	(Soviet Union) Aivars Gipslis	½	½	0	½	½	0	1	½	-	1	½	½	0	½	½	1	1	½	1	½	10½
10	(Soviet Union) Viktor Korchnoi	½	½	½	1	½	½	½	1	0	-	½	½	½	0	½	½	0	1	½	1	10
11	(Soviet Union) Vladimir Bagirov	1	0	½	0	0	1	½	½	½	½	-	½	0	½	½	½	½	1	½	1	9½
12	(Soviet Union) Yuri Averbakh	0	½	½	½	½	0	½	0	½	½	½	-	1	0	½	1	½	½	1	½	9
13	(Soviet Union) Iivo Nei	½	½	0	½	½	0	0	½	1	½	1	0	-	½	½	½	1	0	½	1	9
14	(Soviet Union) Mark Taimanov	½	½	0	0	0	0	0	½	½	1	½	1	½	-	1	0	½	1	½	½	8½
15	(Soviet Union) Semyon Furman	0	½	½	0	½	½	½	½	½	½	½	½	½	0	-	1	0	1	0	1	8½
16	(Soviet Union) Janis Klovans	0	0	0	½	½	½	1	0	0	½	½	0	½	1	0	-	1	½	1	0	7½
17	(Soviet Union) Alexander Zakharov	½	½	0	1	0	½	0	½	0	1	½	½	0	½	1	0	-	½	0	0	7
18	(Soviet Union) Igor Bondarevsky	½	½	½	0	0	0	½	0	½	0	0	½	1	0	0	½	½	-	1	½	6½
19	(Soviet Union) Arkady Novopashin	0	0	½	0	½	0	0	½	0	½	½	0	½	½	1	0	1	0	-	1	6½
20	(Soviet Union) Viatcheslav Osnos	0	0	½	0	0	0	½	0	½	0	0	½	0	½	0	1	1	½	0	-	5

=== Playoff ===
31st Soviet Chess Championship - Playoff
	Player	1	2	3	Total
1	(Soviet Union) Leonid Stein	--	1½	½½	2½
2	(Soviet Union) Boris Spassky	0½	--	½1	2
3	(Soviet Union) Ratmir Kholmov	½½	½0	--	1½
