= Arbiter (chess) =

Official who oversees chess matches

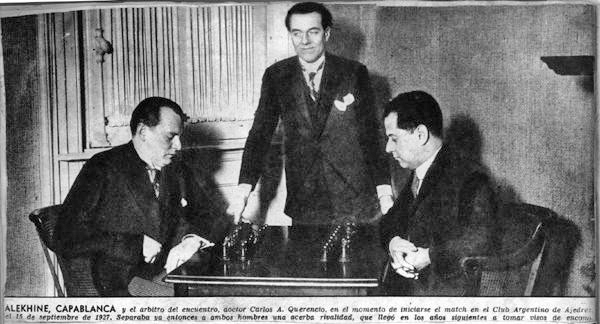
An arbiter (center) overseeing the World Chess Championship 1927 match between Alexander Alekhine (left) and José Raúl Capablanca (right)

In chess tournaments, an arbiter is an official who oversees matches and ensures that the rules of chess are followed.

== International Arbiter ==
International Arbiter is a title awarded by FIDE to individuals deemed capable of acting as arbiter in important chess matches. The title was established in 1951.

Requirements for the title to be awarded are detailed in section B.06 of the FIDE Handbook. As well as thorough knowledge of the laws of chess and a proved impartiality, they include the ability to speak a FIDE-approved language and previous experience as an arbiter in important tournaments. International Arbiters are further categorized by FIDE into four groups, in order of experience, from group D, C, B to A. The FIDE World Chess Federation displays the list of International Arbiters with their ID numbers, name, and title on its official website.

=== Notable International Arbiters ===
Some individuals have had careers as strong players and later become International Arbiters. Notable examples include:

- Albéric O'Kelly de Galway, Grandmaster who was third correspondence chess world champion before becoming an International Arbiter in 1962 and acting as Chief Arbiter at the 1966 and 1969 over-the-board World Championship matches;
- Lothar Schmid, Grandmaster who finished joint second with the then World Champion Tigran Petrosian at Bamberg 1968 and was also a strong correspondence player before becoming an International Arbiter in 1975 and acting as Chief Arbiter in the 1972, 1978, and 1986 World Championship matches.
- Gideon Ståhlberg, Grandmaster who was Sweden's top player for many years and refereed several of Mikhail Botvinnik's world championship matches.
- Zoltán Ribli, was a World Championship Candidate twice and Hungarian Champion three times.
- Yuri Averbakh, was a World Championship Candidate and winner of the 1954 USSR Chess Championship.
- Salo Flohr
- Nana Alexandria
- Peter Romanovsky
- Isaac Kashdan
- Daniel Yanofsky
- Robert Wade
- Vasja Pirc
- Milunka Lazarević
