= Boris Spassky =

Russian chess grandmaster (1937–2025)

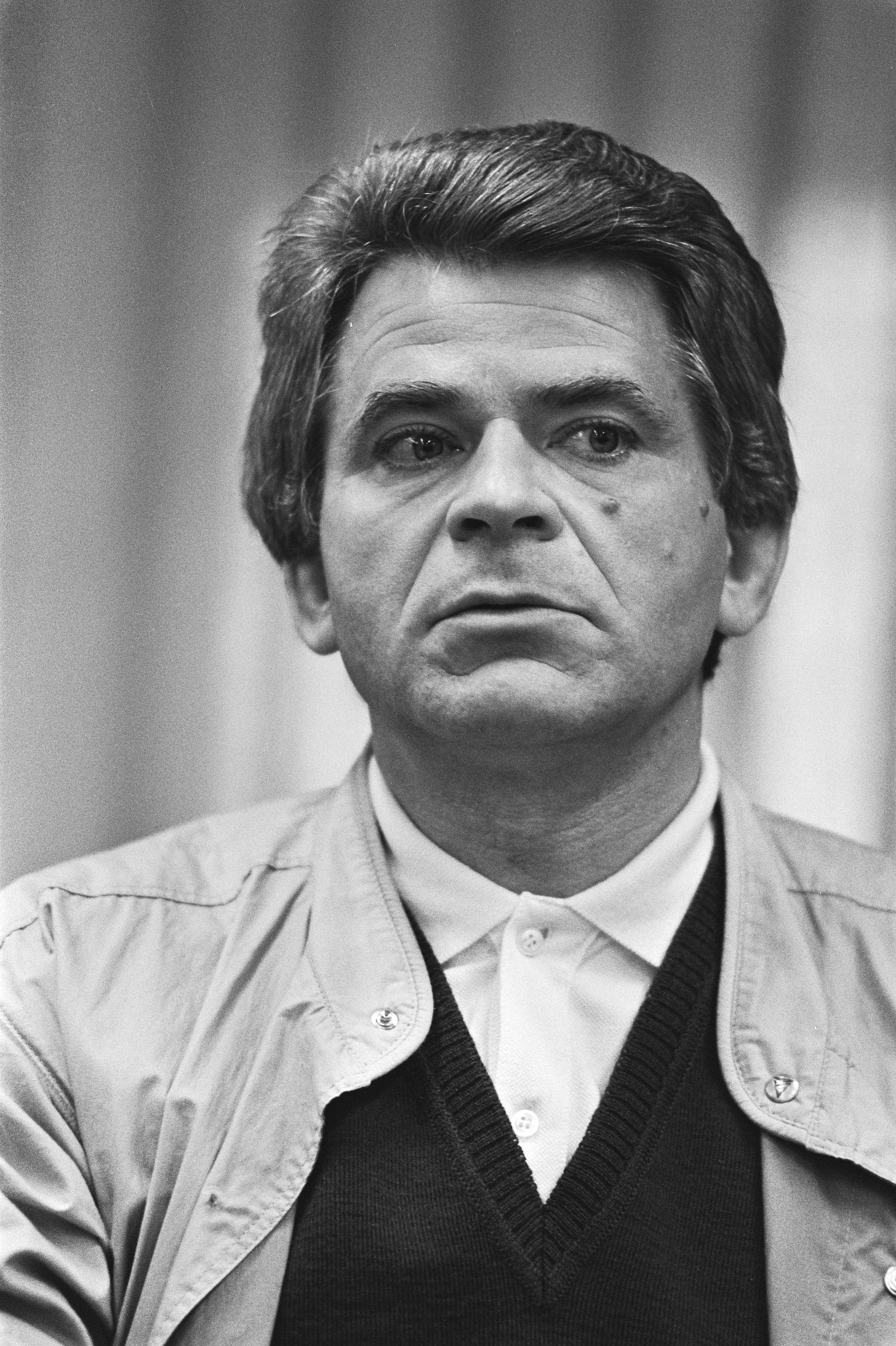
- Spassky in 1983

Personal information
- Born: Boris Vasilyevich Spassky; January 30, 1937 Leningrad, Russian SFSR, Soviet Union
- Died: February 27, 2025 (aged 88) Moscow, Russia

Chess career
- Country: Soviet Union (until 1982); France (1982–2013); Russia (from 2013)
- Title: Grandmaster (1955)
- World Champion: 1969–1972
- Peak rating: 2690 (January 1971)
- Peak ranking: No. 2 (January 1971)

Boris Vasilyevich Spassky (Russian: Борис Васильевич Спасский; January 30, 1937 – February 27, 2025) was a Soviet and Russian chess grandmaster who was the tenth World Chess Champion, holding the title from 1969 to 1972. Spassky played three world championship matches: he lost to Tigran Petrosian in 1966; defeated Petrosian in 1969 to become world champion; then lost to Bobby Fischer in a famous match in 1972.

Spassky won the Soviet Chess Championship twice outright (1961, 1973), and twice lost in playoffs (1956, 1963), after tying for first place during the event proper. He was a World Chess Championship candidate on seven occasions (1956, 1965, 1968, 1974, 1977, 1980, 1985). In addition to his Candidates wins in 1965 and 1968, Spassky reached the semi-final stage in 1974 and the final stage in 1977.

Spassky immigrated to France in 1976 and became a French citizen in 1978. He continued to compete in tournaments, but was no longer a major contender for the world title. Spassky lost an unofficial rematch against Fischer in 1992. In 2012, he left France and returned to Russia.

== Early life ==
Boris Vasilyevich Spassky was born in Leningrad, into a Russian family, on January 30, 1937. His father, Vasili Vladimirovich Spassky, served in the military. He came from the family of Vladimir Alexandrovich Spassky, a prominent Russian Orthodox priest of the Kursk Governorate, later a protoiereus of the Russian Church (since 1916), as well as a State Duma deputy (1912–1917) and an active member of the Union of the Russian People. Boris's mother, Ekaterina Petrovna Spasskaya (née Petrova), was a schoolteacher. She was born in the Ryadnevo village of the Gdov district (now Pskov Oblast) as an illegitimate daughter of Daria Ivanovna Ivanova (from a local peasant family) and Andrei Kupriyanovich Kupriyanov, a landlord who owned houses in Saint Petersburg and Pskov. After some time Daria Ivanovna fled to St. Petersburg, leaving her daughter with Petr Vasiliev, a relative of hers, who raised Ekaterina under the surname of Petrova. She joined her mother later on.

Spassky learned to play chess at the age of five on a train evacuating from Leningrad during the siege of Leningrad in World War II. During the war, he was sent to an orphanage in Siberia. He first drew wide attention in 1947, aged 10, when he defeated Soviet champion Mikhail Botvinnik in a simultaneous exhibition in Leningrad. Spassky's early coach was Vladimir Zak, a respected master and trainer. During his youth, from the age of 10, Spassky often worked on chess for several hours a day with master-level coaches. He set records as the youngest Soviet player to achieve first category rank (aged 10), candidate master rank (aged 11), and Soviet Master rank (aged 15). In 1952, aged 15, Spassky scored 50 percent in the Soviet Championship semi-final at Riga, and placed second in the Leningrad Championship that same year, for which he was highly praised by Botvinnik.

== Career ==
As a statistic encompassing all of the games of his career, Spassky's most-played openings with both the White and Black pieces were the Sicilian Defence and the Ruy Lopez.

Spassky beat six undisputed World Champions at least twice (not necessarily while they were reigning): Vasily Smyslov, Mikhail Tal, Tigran Petrosian, Bobby Fischer, Anatoly Karpov, and Garry Kasparov.

=== Young grandmaster ===
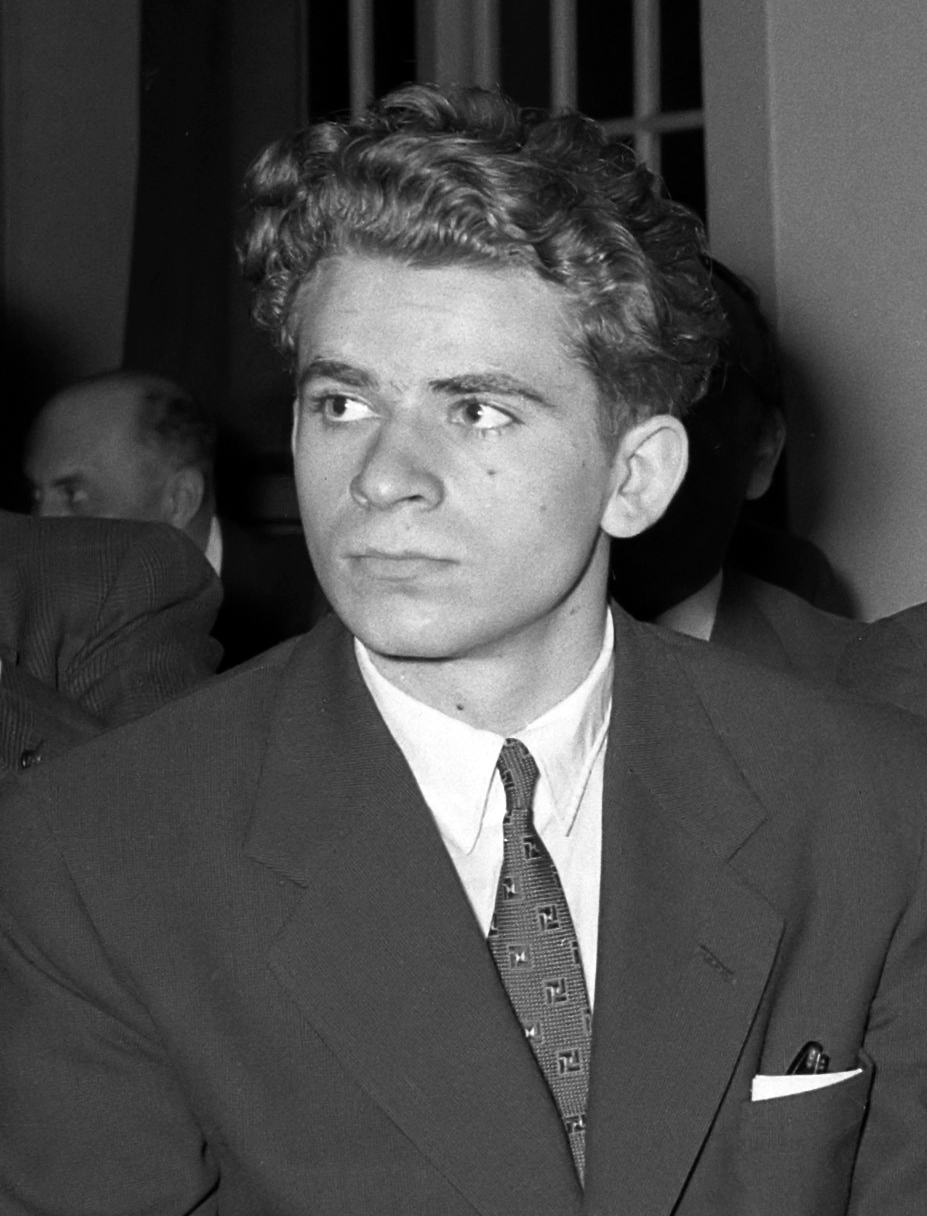
Spassky in 1956

Spassky made his international debut in 1953, aged sixteen, in Bucharest, Romania, finishing tied for fourth place with László Szabó on 12/19, an event won by his trainer, Alexander Tolush. At Bucharest he defeated Vasily Smyslov, who challenged for the World Championship the following year. In the same year, Spassky was awarded the title of International Master by FIDE at its congress in Schaffhausen, Switzerland. In his first attempt at the Soviet Championship final, the 22nd in the series, held in Moscow 1955, Spassky tied for third place with 11½/19, after Smyslov and Efim Geller, which was sufficient to qualify him for the Gothenburg Interzonal later that year.

The same year, he won the World Junior Chess Championship held at Antwerp, Belgium, scoring 6/7 to qualify for the final, then 8/9 in the final to win by a full point over Edmar Mednis. Spassky competed for the Lokomotiv Voluntary Sports Society.

By sharing seventh place with 11/20 at Gothenburg, Spassky qualified for the 1956 Candidates' Tournament, held in Amsterdam, automatically gaining the grandmaster title, and was at that time the youngest to hold the title. At Amsterdam, he tied for third place with four others in the ten-player field, scoring 9½/18. At the 23rd Soviet final, held in Leningrad in January–February 1956, Spassky shared first place on 11½/19, with Mark Taimanov and Yuri Averbakh, but Taimanov won the subsequent playoff to become champion, defeating Spassky in both their games. Spassky then tied for first in a semifinal for the 24th Soviet championship, thereby qualifying.

=== Uneven results ===
Spassky then went into a slump in world championship qualifying events, failing to advance to the next two Interzonals (1958 and 1962), a prerequisite to earn the right to play for the world championship. This crisis coincided with the hard three final years of his first marriage before his divorce in 1961, the same year that he broke with his trainer Tolush.

In the 24th Soviet final, played at Moscow in January–February 1957, Spassky shared fourth place with Tolush, as both scored 13/21.

Spassky's failure to qualify for the Portoroz Interzonal came after a last-round defeat at the hands of Mikhail Tal, in a nervy game in the 1958 Soviet championship, held at Riga. Spassky had the advantage for much of the game, but missed a difficult win after adjournment, then declined a draw. A win would have qualified Spassky for the Interzonal, and a draw would have ensured a share of fourth place with Yuri Averbakh, with qualification possible via a playoff.

Spassky tied for first place at Moscow 1959 on 7/11, with Smyslov and David Bronstein. He shared second place in the 26th Soviet final with Tal, at Tbilisi 1959, finishing a point behind champion Tigran Petrosian, on 12½/19. Soon after Spassky notched a victory at Riga 1959, with 11½/13, one-half point in front of Vladas Mikėnas. Spassky finished in a tie for ninth at the 27th Soviet final in Leningrad, with 10/19, as fellow Leningrader Viktor Korchnoi scored his first of four Soviet titles. Spassky travelled to Argentina, where he shared first place with Bobby Fischer, two points ahead of Bronstein, at Mar del Plata 1960 on 13½/15, defeating Fischer in their first career meeting. Spassky played on board one for the USSR at the 7th Student Olympiad in Leningrad, where he won the silver, but lost the gold to William Lombardy, also losing their individual encounter.

Another disappointment for Spassky came at the qualifier for the next Interzonal, the Soviet final, played in Moscow 1961, where he again lost a crucial last-round game, this to Leonid Stein, who thus qualified, as Spassky finished equal fifth with 11/19, while Petrosian won.

=== Title contender ===
Spassky decided upon a switch in trainers, from the volatile attacker Tolush to the calmer strategist Igor Bondarevsky. This proved the key to his resurgence. He won his first of two USSR titles in the 29th Soviet championship at Baku 1961, with a score of 14½/20, one-half point ahead of Lev Polugaevsky. Spassky shared second with Polugaevsky at Havana 1962 with 16/21, behind winner Miguel Najdorf. He placed joint fifth, with Leonid Stein at the 30th Soviet championship held in Yerevan 1962, with 11½/19. At Leningrad 1963, the site of the 31st Soviet final, Spassky tied for first with Stein and Ratmir Kholmov, with Stein winning the playoff, which was held in 1964. Spassky won at Belgrade 1964 with an undefeated 13/17, as Korchnoi and Borislav Ivkov shared second place with 11½. He finished fourth at Sochi 1964 with 9½/15, as Nikolai Krogius won.

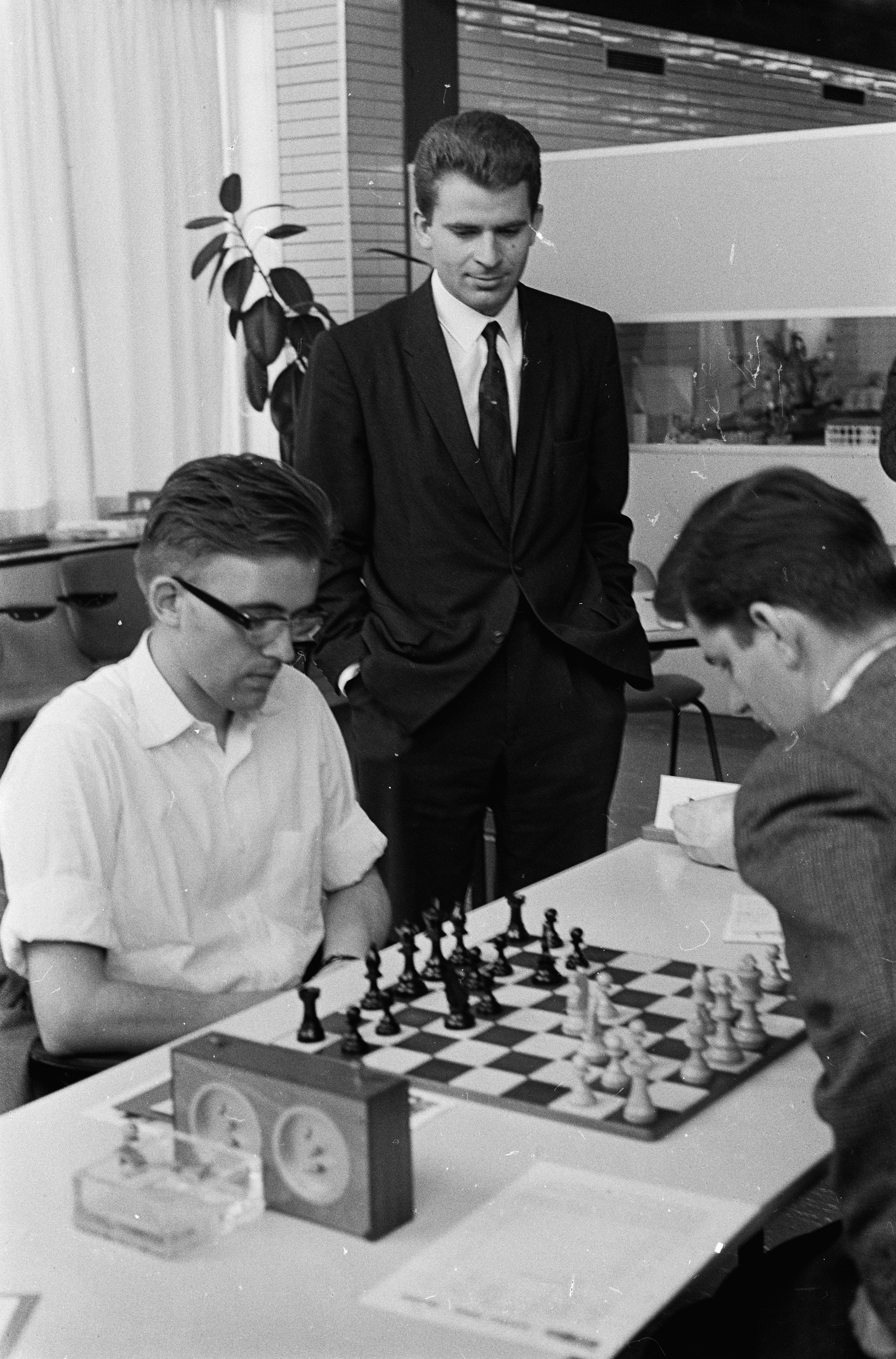
Spassky (standing) and Bent Larsen (with black), Amsterdam (June 1964)

In the 1964 Soviet Zonal at Moscow, a seven-player double round-robin event, Spassky won with 7/12, overcoming a start of one draw and two losses, to advance to the Amsterdam Interzonal the same year. At Amsterdam, he tied for first place, along with Mikhail Tal, Vasily Smyslov and Bent Larsen on 17/23, with all four, along with Borislav Ivkov and Lajos Portisch thus qualifying for the newly created Candidates' Matches the next year. With Bondarevsky, Spassky's style broadened and deepened, with poor results mostly banished, yet his fighting spirit was even enhanced. He added psychology and surprise to his quiver, and this proved enough to eventually propel him to the top.

=== Challenger ===
Spassky was considered an all-rounder on the chess board, and his adaptable "universal style" was a distinct advantage in beating many top grandmasters. In the 1965 cycle, he beat Paul Keres in the quarterfinal round at Riga 1965 with careful strategy, triumphing in the last game to win 6–4 (+4−2=4). Also at Riga, he defeated Efim Geller with mating attacks, winning by 5½–2½ (+3−0=5). Then, in his Candidates' Final match against Mikhail Tal at Tbilisi 1965, Spassky often managed to steer play into quieter positions, either avoiding former champion Tal's tactical strength, or exacting too high a price for complications. Though losing the first game, he won by 7–4 (+4−1=6).

Spassky won two tournaments in the run-up to the final. He shared first at the third Chigorin Memorial in Sochi, in 1965 with Wolfgang Unzicker on 10½/15, then tied for first at Hastings 1965–66 with Wolfgang Uhlmann on 7½/9.

Spassky lost a keenly fought match to Petrosian in Moscow, with three wins against Petrosian's four, with seventeen draws, though the last of his three victories came only in the twenty-third game, after Petrosian had ensured his retention of the title, the first outright match victory for a reigning champion since the latter of Alexander Alekhine's successful defences against Efim Bogoljubov in 1934. Spassky's first event after the title match was the fourth Chigorin Memorial, where he finished tied for fifth with Anatoly Lein as Korchnoi won. Spassky then finished ahead of Petrosian and a super-class field at Santa Monica 1966 (the Piatigorsky Cup), with 11½/18, half a point ahead of Bobby Fischer, as he overcame the American grandmaster's challenge after Fischer had scored 3½/9 in the first cycle of the event. Spassky also won at Beverwijk 1967 with 11/15, one-half point ahead of Anatoly Lutikov, and shared first place at Sochi 1967 on 10/15 with Krogius, Alexander Zaitsev, Leonid Shamkovich, and Vladimir Simagin.

As losing finalist in 1966, Spassky was automatically seeded into the next Candidates' cycle. In 1968, he faced Geller again, this time at Sukhumi, and won by the same margin as in 1965 (5½–2½, +3−0=5). He next met Bent Larsen at Malmö, and again won by the score of 5½–2½ after winning the first three games. The final was against his Leningrad rival Korchnoi at Kiev, and Spassky triumphed (+4−1=5), which earned him another match with Petrosian. Spassky's final tournament appearance before the match came at Palma, where he shared second place (+10−1=6) with Larsen, a point behind Korchnoi. Spassky's flexibility of style was the key to victory over Petrosian, by 12½–10½, with the site again being Moscow.

=== World Champion ===
In Spassky's first appearance after winning the crown, he placed first at San Juan, Puerto Rico, in October 1969 with 11½/15, one and one-half points clear of second. He then played the annual event at Palma, where he finished fifth with 10/17. While Spassky was undefeated and handed tournament victor Larsen one of his three losses, his fourteen draws kept him from seriously contending for first prize, as he came two points behind Larsen. In March–April 1970, Spassky played first board for the Soviet side in the celebrated USSR vs. World event at Belgrade, where he scored +1−1=1 in the first three rounds against Larsen before Stein replaced him for the final match, as the Soviets won by the odd point, 20½–19½. He won a quadrangular event at Leiden 1970 with 7/12, a point ahead of Jan Hein Donner, who was followed by Larsen and Botvinnik, the latter of whom was making his final appearance in serious play. Spassky shared first at the annual IBM event held in Amsterdam 1970 with Polugaevsky on 11½/15. He was third at Gothenburg 1971 with 8/11, behind winners Vlastimil Hort and Ulf Andersson. He shared first with Hans Ree at the 1971 Canadian Open in Vancouver. In November and December, Spassky finished the year by tying for sixth with Tal, scoring +4−2=11, at the Alekhine Memorial in Moscow, which was won by Stein and Anatoly Karpov.

=== Championship match with Fischer ===
Spassky's reign as world chess champion lasted for three years before he lost to Bobby Fischer of the United States in 1972, popularly known as the Match of the Century. The contest took place in Reykjavík, Iceland, at the height of the Cold War, and consequently was seen as symbolic of the political confrontation between the two superpowers. Spassky accommodated many demands by Fischer, including moving the third game into a side room. The Fischer vs. Spassky world championship was the most widely covered chess match in history, reported upon by mainstream media throughout the world. Secretary of State Henry Kissinger spoke with Fischer urging him to play the match, and chess was at its apex.

Going into the match, Fischer had played Spassky in five games – drawing two and losing three. In addition, Spassky had secured Geller as his coach, who also had a plus score against Fischer. However, Fischer won the title match 12½/8½ (+7−3=11), with one of the three losses by default.

The match could be divided into halves, the first won convincingly by Fischer, and the second a close battle. Before the match, Fischer had defeated Mark Taimanov, Bent Larsen, and Tigran Petrosian, but Spassky maintained his composure and competitiveness. It has been suggested that Spassky's preparation was largely bypassed by Fischer, since Spassky and his team wrongly expected Fischer to always play 1. e4 openings as White.

According to Reshevsky, the match as a whole was disappointing. "It was marked by blunders by both players. The blunders committed by Spassky were incredible. In two games, for example, Spassky overlooked a one-move combination. In the first, he was compelled to resign immediately, and, in the other, he threw away all chances for a win. Fischer was also not in his best form. He made errors in a number of games. His play lacked brilliance, but his defense was excellent."

=== Ex-champion (1973–1985) ===
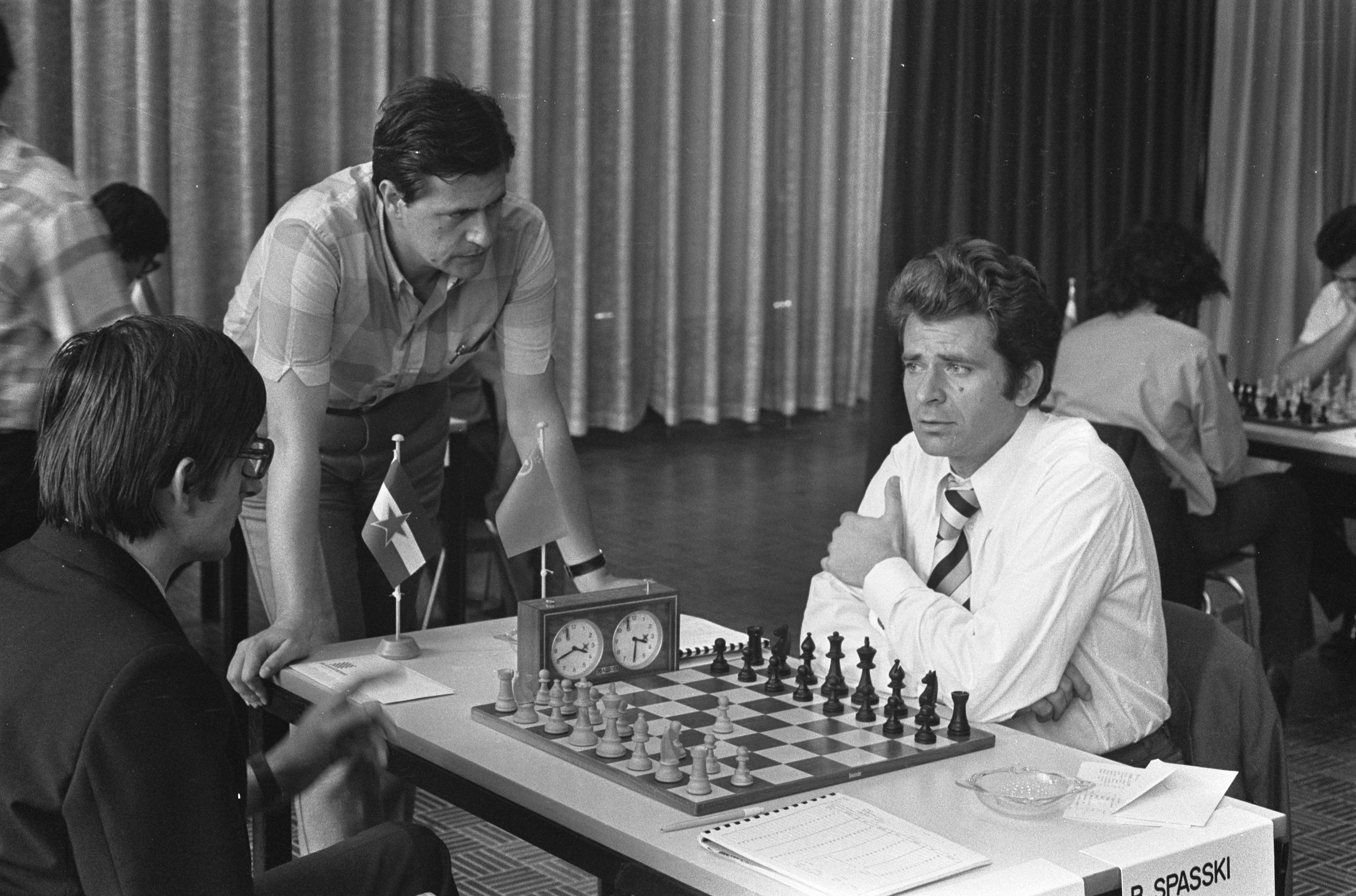
Albin Planinc vs. Boris Spassky in 1973

In February–March 1973, Spassky finished equal third at Tallinn with 9/15, three points behind Tal; he tied for first at Dortmund on 9½/15 (+5−1=9) with Hans-Joachim Hecht and Ulf Andersson. Spassky finished in fourth place at the annual IBM tournament held in Amsterdam, one point behind winners Petrosian and Albin Planinc. In September, Spassky went 10/15 to finish second to Tal in the Chigorin Memorial at Sochi by a point. In the 41st Soviet Championship at Moscow, Spassky scored 11½/17 to win by a full point in a field which included all the top Soviet grandmasters of the time.

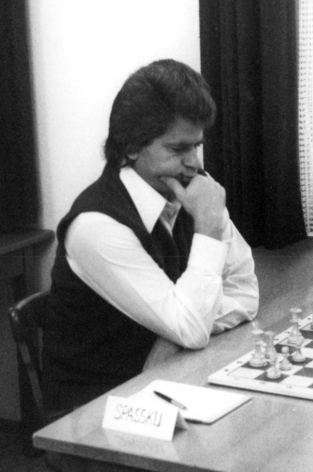
Spassky in 1980

In the 1974 Candidates' matches, Spassky first defeated American Robert Byrne in San Juan, Puerto Rico, by 4½–1½ (+3−0=3); he then lost the semifinal match to Anatoly Karpov in Leningrad, despite winning the first game, (+1−4=6). In Spassky's only tournament action of 1974, he played at Solingen, finishing with 8½/14 (+4−1=9), thus sharing third with Bojan Kurajica, behind joint winners Lubomir Kavalek and Polugaevsky, who scored 10.

During 1975, Spassky played two events, the first being the annual tournament at Tallinn, where he finished equal second with Fridrik Olafsson, scoring 9½/15 (+5−1=9), one point behind Keres, the last international event won by the latter before his sudden death in June 1975. In October–November, Spassky finished second to Geller at the Alekhine Memorial in Moscow with a score of 10 points from fifteen games (+6−1=8).

In 1976, Spassky was obliged to return to the Interzonal stage, and finished in a tie for tenth place in Manila, well short of qualifying for the Candidates matches, but was nominated to play after Fischer declined his place. Spassky won an exhibition match with Dutch grandmaster Jan Timman at Amsterdam 1977 by 4–2. He triumphed in extra games in his quarterfinal Candidates' match over Vlastimil Hort at Reykjavík 1977 by 8½–7½. This match saw Spassky fall ill, exhaust all his available rest days while recovering; then the healthy Hort used one of his own rest days, to allow Spassky more time to recover; Spassky eventually won the match.

Spassky won an exhibition match over Robert Hübner at Solingen, 1977 by 3½–2½, then defeated Lubomir Kavalek, also at Solingen, by 4–2 in another exhibition. His next Candidates' match was against Portisch at Geneva 1977, and Spassky won by 8½–6½, to qualify for the final. At Belgrade 1977–78, Spassky lost to Korchnoi, by (+4−7=7). In this match, Spassky fell behind 2½–7½ after losing the tenth game; however, he then won four consecutive games. After draws in games fifteen and sixteen, Korchnoi won the next two games to clinch the match by the score of 10½–7½.

Spassky, as losing finalist, was seeded into the 1980 Candidates' matches, and faced Portisch again, with this match held in Mexico. After fourteen games, the match was 7–7, but Portisch advanced since he had won more games with the black pieces. Spassky narrowly missed qualification from the 1982 Toluca Interzonal with 8/13, finishing half a point short, in third place behind Portisch and Eugenio Torre, both of whom thus qualified. The 1985 Candidates' event was held as a round-robin tournament at Montpellier, France, and Spassky was nominated as an organizer's choice. He scored 8/15 to tie for sixth place with Alexander Beliavsky, behind joint winners Andrei Sokolov, Rafael Vaganian, and Artur Yusupov, and once again – one-half point short of potentially qualifying via a playoff. This was Spassky's last appearance at the Candidates' level.

=== International team results ===
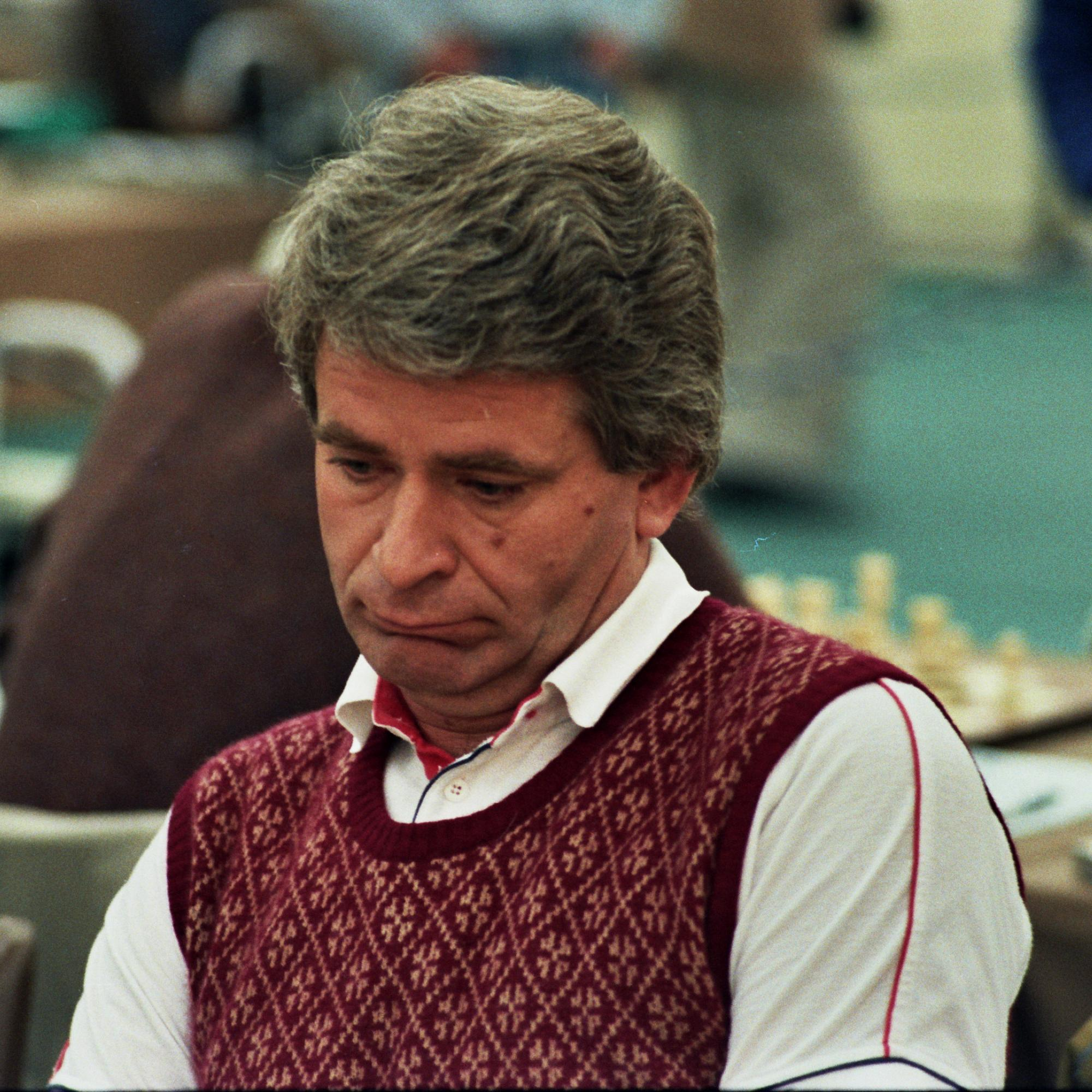
Spassky at the Thessaloniki Olympiad, 1984

Spassky played five times for the USSR in Student Olympiads, winning eight medals. He scored 38½/47 (+31−1=15), for 81.91 percent. His complete results are:

- Lyon 1955, board 2, 7½/8 (+7−0=1), team gold, board gold;
- Reykjavík 1957, board 2, 7/9 (+5−0=4), team gold, board gold;
- Varna 1958, board 2, 6½/9 (+4−0=5), team gold;
- Leningrad 1960, board 1, 10/12 (+9−1=2), team silver;
- Mariánské Lázně 1962, board 1, 7½/9 (+6−0=3), team gold, board gold.

Spassky played twice for the USSR in the European Team Championships, winning four gold medals. He scored 8½/12 (+5−0=7), for 70.83 percent. His complete results are:

- Vienna 1957, board 5, 3½/5 (+2−0=3), team gold, board gold;
- Bath, Somerset 1973, board 1, 5/7 (+3−0=4), team gold, board gold.

Spassky played seven times for the Soviet Olympiad team. He won thirteen medals, and scored 69/94 (+45−1=48), for 73.40 percent. His complete results are:

- Varna 1962, board 3, 11/14 (+8−0=6), team gold, board gold medal;
- Tel Aviv 1964, 2nd reserve, 10½/13 (+8−0=5), team gold, board bronze;
- Havana 1966, board 2, 10/15, team gold.
- Lugano 1968, board 2, 10/14, team gold, board bronze;
- Siegen 1970, board 1, 9½/12, team gold, board gold;
- Nice 1974, board 3, 11/15, board silver, team gold;
- Buenos Aires 1978, board 1, 7/11 (+4−1=6), team silver.

Spassky played board one in the USSR vs. Rest of the World match at Belgrade 1970, scoring (+1−1=1) against Larsen.

Spassky then represented France in three Olympiads, on board one in each case. For Thessaloniki 1984, he scored 8/14 (+2−0=12). At Dubai 1986, he scored 9/14 (+4−0=10). Finally at Thessaloniki 1988, he scored 7½/13 (+3−1=9). He also played board one for France at the inaugural World Team Championships, Lucerne 1985, where he scored 5½/9 (+3−1=5).

=== Later tournament career (after 1976) ===
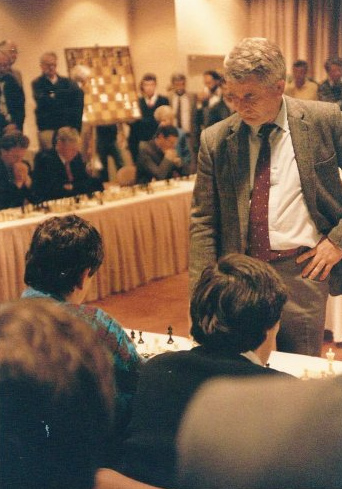
Spassky in 1989

In his later years, Spassky showed a reluctance to devote himself completely to chess. In 1976, he immigrated to France with his third wife; he became a French citizen in 1978, and competed for France in the Chess Olympiads. Spassky later lived with his wife in Meudon near Paris.

Spassky did, however, score some notable triumphs in his later years. In his return to tournament play after the loss to Korchnoi, he tied for first at Bugojno 1978 on 10/15 with Karpov, with both players scoring +6−1=8 to finish a point ahead of Timman. He was clear first at Montilla–Moriles 1978 with 6½/9. At Munich 1979, he tied for first place with 8½/13, with Yuri Balashov, Ulf Andersson and Robert Hübner. He shared first at Baden in 1980, on 10½/15 with Alexander Beliavsky. He won his preliminary group at Hamburg 1982 with 5½/6, but lost the final playoff match to Anatoly Karpov in extra games. His best result during this period was clear first at Linares 1983 with 6½/10, ahead of Karpov and Andersson, who shared second. At London Lloyds' Bank Open 1984, he tied for first with John Nunn and Murray Chandler, on 7/9. He won at Reykjavík 1985. At Brussels 1985, he placed second with 10½/13 behind Korchnoi. At Reggio Emilia 1986, he tied for 2nd–5th places with 6/11 behind Zoltán Ribli. He swept Fernand Gobet 4–0 in a match at Fribourg 1987. He finished equal first at the Plaza tournament in the New Zealand International Festival of the Arts at Wellington in 1988, with Chandler and Eduard Gufeld. Spassky's Elo rating was in the world top ten continually throughout the early 1980s until it dropped out in 1983, and intermittently throughout the mid-1980s until it dropped out for the final time in 1987.

However, Spassky's performances in the World Cup events of 1988 and 1989 showed that he could by this stage finish no higher than the middle of the pack against elite fields. He participated in three of the six events of the World Cup. At Belfort, he scored 8/15 for a joint 4th–7th place, as Garry Kasparov won. At Reykjavík, he scored 7/17 for a joint 15th–16th place, with Kasparov again winning. Finally, at Barcelona, Spassky scored 7½/16 for a tied 8th–12th place, as Kasparov shared first with Ljubomir Ljubojević.

Spassky played in the 1990 French Championship at Angers, placing fourth with 10½/15, as Marc Santo-Roman won. At Salamanca 1991, he placed 2nd with 7½/11 behind winner Evgeny Vladimirov. Then in the 1991 French Championship at Montpellier, he scored 9½/15 for a tied 4th–5th place, as Santo-Roman won again.

In 1992, Bobby Fischer, after a twenty-year hiatus from chess, re-emerged to arrange a "Revenge Match of the 20th century" against Spassky in Montenegro and Belgrade; this was a rematch of the 1972 World Championship. At the time, Spassky was rated 106th in the FIDE rankings, and Fischer did not appear on the list at all, owing to his inactivity. Spassky lost the match with a score of +5−10=15, earning US$1.65 million for losing the match.

Spassky then played the 16-year-old prodigy Judit Polgár in a 1993 match in Budapest, losing narrowly by 4½–5½.

Spassky continued to play occasional events through much of the 1990s, such as the Veterans vs. Women match in Prague, 1995.

== Later years ==
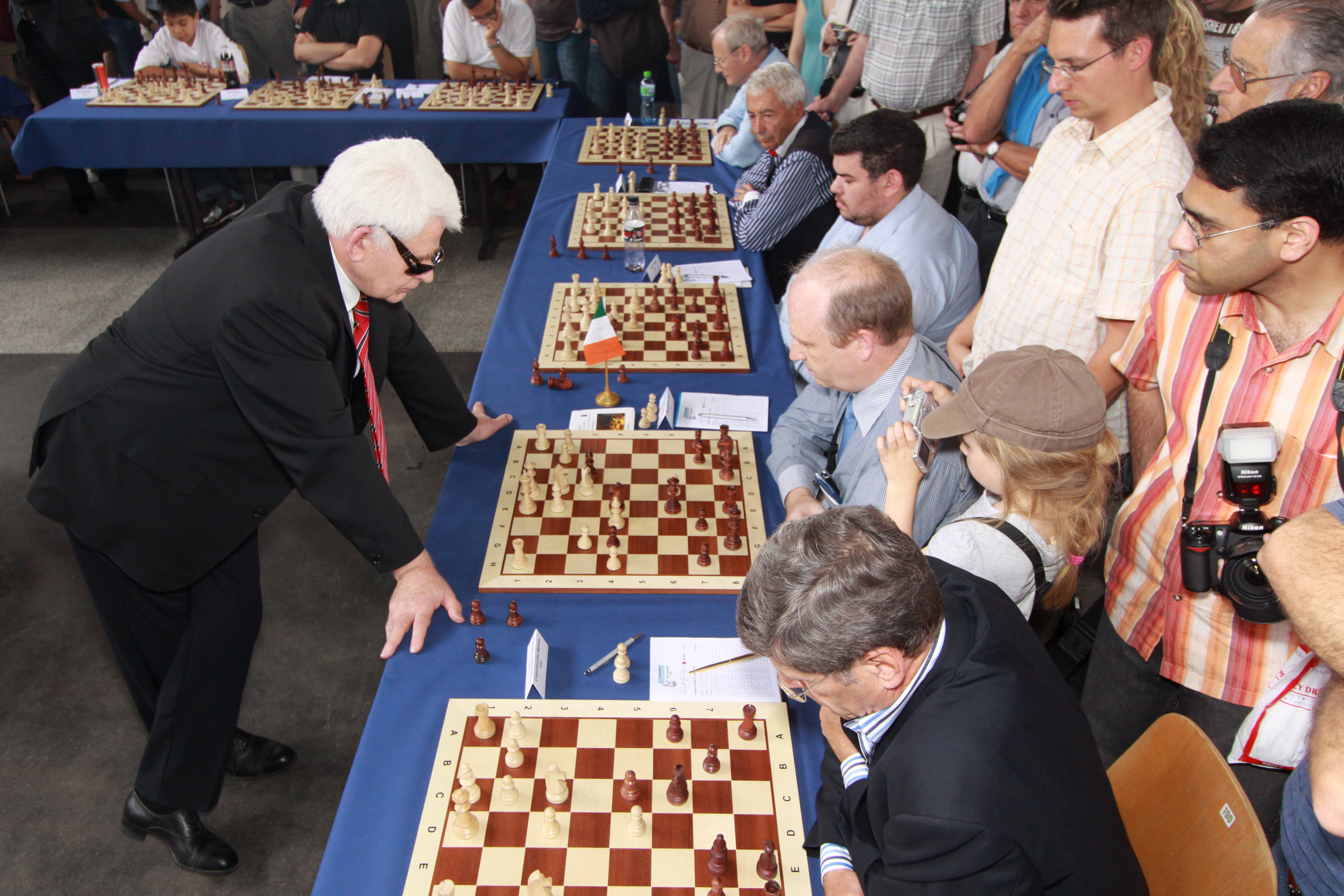
Spassky in France in 2009

On October 1, 2006, Spassky suffered a minor stroke during a chess lecture in San Francisco. In his first major post-stroke play, he drew a six-game rapid match with Hungarian Grandmaster Lajos Portisch in April 2007.

On March 27, 2010, at 73 years old, he became the oldest surviving former World Chess Champion upon the death of Vasily Smyslov.

On September 23, 2010, ChessBase reported that Spassky had suffered a more serious stroke that had left him paralysed on his left side. After that he returned to France for a long rehabilitation programme. On August 16, 2012, Spassky left France to return to Russia under disputed circumstances and took up residence in an apartment in Moscow.

On September 25, 2016, he made a public speech at the opening of the Tal Memorial tournament. He said he had "the very brightest memories" of Mikhail Tal and told an anecdote from the 15th Chess Olympiad about Soviet analysis of an adjourned game between Fischer and Botvinnik. He was described by Chess24 as being 'sprightly'.

Spassky died in Moscow on February 27, 2025, at the age of 88.

== Legacy ==
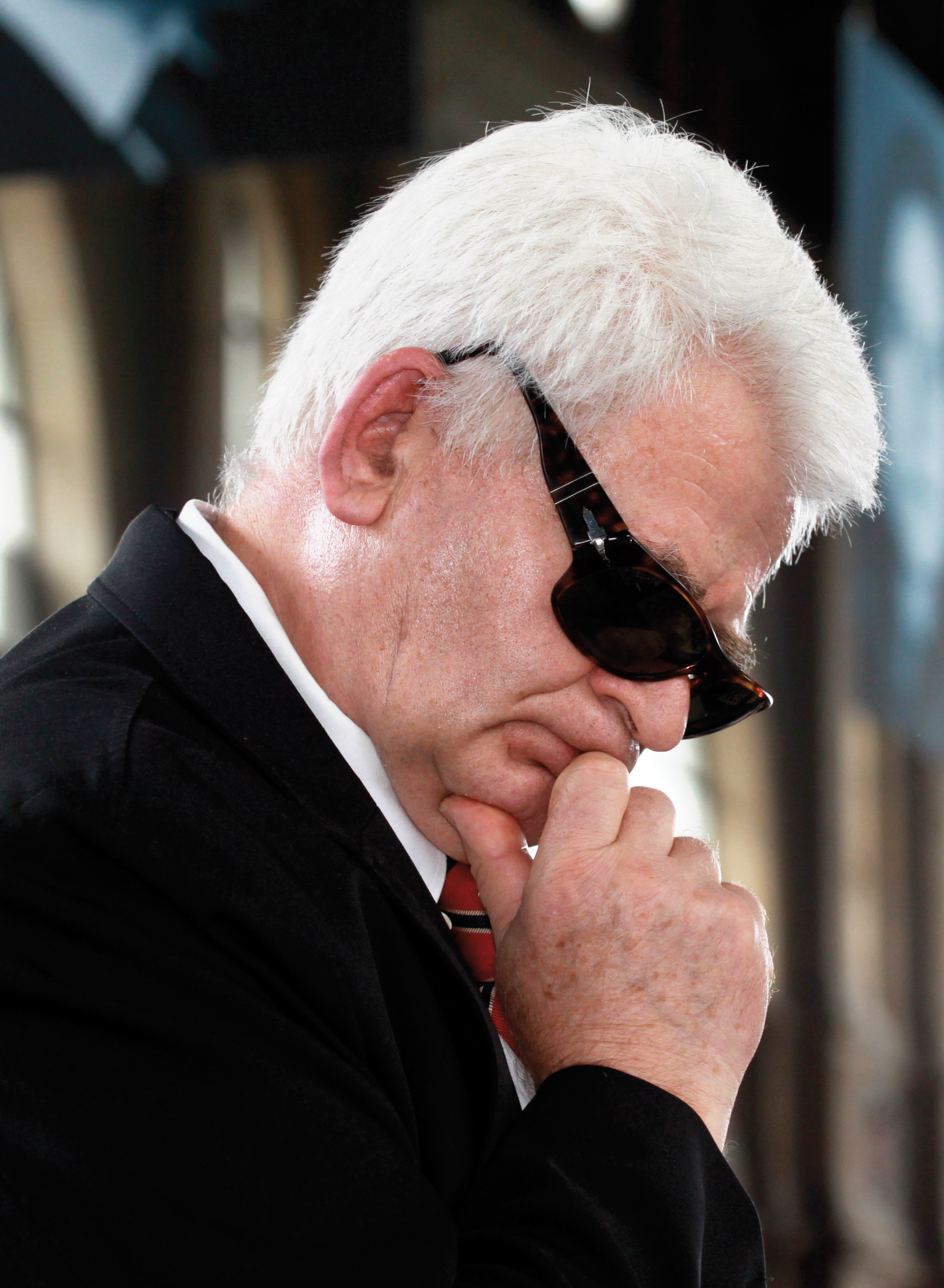
Spassky, 2009

Spassky's best years were as a youthful prodigy in the mid-1950s, and in the mid- to late 1960s. He applauded Fischer in Game 6 of their 1972 match, and defended Fischer when the latter was detained near Narita Airport in 2004.

Spassky has been described as a "universal" chess player. While other chess grandmasters such as Efim Geller and Bobby Fischer excel in openings, Spassky's primary focus was in middlegame and tactics.

He was not only one of the greatest players of the Soviet era and the world, but also a true gentleman. His contributions to chess will never be forgotten.

— Arkady Dvorkovich, FIDE president

Spassky succeeded with a wide variety of openings, including the King's Gambit, 1.e4 e5 2.f4, an aggressive and risky line rarely seen at the top level. The chess game between "Kronsteen" and "McAdams" in the early part of the James Bond movie From Russia With Love is based on a game in that opening played between Spassky and David Bronstein in 1960 in which Spassky ("Kronsteen") was victorious.

His contributions to opening theory extend to reviving the Marshall Attack for Black in the Ruy Lopez (1.e4 e5 2.Nf3 Nc6 3.Bb5 a6 4.Ba4 Nf6 5.0-0 Be7 6.Re1 b5 7.Bb3 0-0 8.c3 d5), developing the Leningrad Variation for White in the Nimzo-Indian Defence (1.d4 Nf6 2.c4 e6 3.Nc3 Bb4 4.Bg5), the Spassky Variation on the Black side of the Nimzo-Indian, and the Closed Variation of the Sicilian Defence for White (1.e4 c5 2.Nc3). A variation of the B19 Caro-Kann (1.e4 c6 2.d4 d5 3.Nc3 dxe4 4.Nxe4 Bf5 5.Ng3 Bg6 6.h4 h6 7.Nf3 Nd7 8.h5) also bears his name, as does a rare line in the King's Indian Attack (1.Nf3 Nf6 2.g3 b5!?).

Spassky was played by Liev Schreiber in the 2014 film Pawn Sacrifice.

== Personal life ==
Boris was married three times. His first wife (1959–1961) was Nadezda Konstantinovna Latyntceva. Their daughter was born in 1960. His second wife was Larisa Zakharovna Solovyova. She gave birth to a son in 1967. His third marriage, in 1975 in France, was to Marina Yurievna Shcherbachova, granddaughter of the Russian war general and White movement activist Dmitry Shcherbachev. Their son was born in 1980.

His younger sister Iraida Spasskaya (born November 6, 1944) is a four-time champion of the Soviet Union in Russian draughts and the world vice-champion in international draughts (1974).

In an interview to a Western journalist Spassky talked about his psychological approach to chess:

I prefer to have good relations with my opponent. My chess suffers if I have to play a man I consider unfriendly. When I am in form my style is a little bit stubborn, almost brutal. Sometimes I feel a great spirit of fight which drives me on. But deep down I lack faith in myself. I have often found that I have caught the basic idea of a position, the correct plan, but my great weakness is that I fail to follow the logical pattern through from beginning to end.

Bobby Fischer once wrote that "Spassky sits at the board with the same dead expression whether he's mating or being mated. He can blunder away a piece and you are never sure whether it's a blunder or a fantastically deep sacrifice."

=== Politics and religion ===
During his meeting with fans in Kaliningrad in 2005 Spassky stated about the economic and social decline of Russia in the 1990s: "If only I knew what was going to happen to our country, I would've joined the Communist Party."

In 2005 Spassky signed the Letter of 5000 addressed to the Prosecutor General of Russia, along with Igor Shafarevich, Vyacheslav Klykov, Vasily Belov and other activists. The petition suggested that all religious and national Jewish organizations that functioned on the territory of Russia according to the Shulchan Aruch codes should be shut down for extremism, warning about a "hidden campaign of genocide against the Russian people and their traditional society and values". He later tried to distance himself from the petition, saying that signing the petition was a mistake.

In 2006, Spassky described himself as an Orthodox Christian, a monarchist and a Russian nationalist.

Original (russian)

… я – убежденный монархист, и в советские годы им оставался и никогда этого не скрывал. Считаю, что величие России связано с деятельностью национальных лидеров, какими были наши цари. …

… А по своим убеждениям я – русский националист, и ничего тут страшного нет, не бойтесь. Утверждают, что русский националист – это большая бяка, обязательно антисемит, расист, национал-большевик. Нет – для националиста существуют Бог и уважающие друг друга нации. …

… Что радует в современной России – церкви оживают …

Translation:
English (translation)

I'm a convinced monarchist, I remained a monarchist during the Soviet years and never tried to hide that. I believe that the greatness of Russia is connected to the activity of the national leaders represented by our tsars.

As for my views—I'm a Russian nationalist, and there's nothing scary about it, don't be afraid. Some say that Russian nationalist is a nasty thing, most definitely an antisemite, a racist, a national-Bolshevik. No; for a nationalist God exists and nations that respect each other.

What pleases me in modern Russia is that the churches are coming back to life.

== Notable games ==
- Boris Spassky vs. David Bronstein, USSR championship, 1960, King's Gambit Accepted, Modern Defence (C36), 1–0 Spassky defeats the former world championship contender with a spectacular rook sacrifice. The game was used, with some minor adjustments, in the opening scene of the James Bond film From Russia with Love.
- Boris Spassky vs. Bobby Fischer, Santa Monica 1966, Grunfeld Defence, Exchange Variation (D87), 1–0 Fischer seems to equalise in a sharp game, but he makes a small mistake and Spassky capitalises.
- Boris Spassky vs. Efim Geller, Sukhumi Candidates' match 1968, game 6, Sicilian Defence, Closed Variation (B25), 1–0 One of three wins by Spassky over Geller in this match using the same variation, which is one of Spassky's favourites.
- Boris Spassky vs. Tigran Petrosian, World Championship match, Moscow 1969, game 19, Sicilian Defence, Najdorf Variation (B94), 1–0 Aggressive style of play and combinations show Spassky at his heights.
- Bent Larsen vs. Boris Spassky, Belgrade 1970 (match USSR vs. Rest of the World), Nimzo-Larsen Attack, Modern Variation (A01), 0–1 Another short win over a noted grandmaster.
- Boris Spassky vs. Bobby Fischer, Siegen Olympiad 1970, Grunfeld Defence, Exchange Variation (D87), 1–0 Fischer tries the Grunfeld again against Spassky, and the game is remarkably similar to their 1966 encounter.
- Boris Spassky vs. Bobby Fischer, World Championship match, Reykjavík 1972, game 11, Sicilian Defense, Najdorf, Poisoned Pawn Variation (B97), 1–0 Fischer's only loss in his favourite Poisoned Pawn Variation.
- Anatoly Karpov vs. Boris Spassky, Candidates' match, Leningrad 1974, game 1, Sicilian Defence, Scheveningen Variation (B83), 0–1 Spassky lost the match, but he started strongly with this win.

Awards
Preceded by Tigran Petrosian	World Chess Champion; 1969–1972	Succeeded by Bobby Fischer
Achievements
Preceded by Tigran Petrosian	Youngest chess grandmaster ever 1955–1958	Succeeded by Bobby Fischer
