= 1973 USSR Chess Championship =

USSR Chess Championship

41st USSR Chess Championship
- Location: Moscow

Champion
- Boris Spassky

The 1973 Soviet Chess Championship was the 41st edition of USSR Chess Championship. Held from 2–26 October 1973 in Moscow. The tournament was won by Boris Spassky. The final were preceded by semifinals events at Frunze, Kirovabad, Lvov and Voronezh.

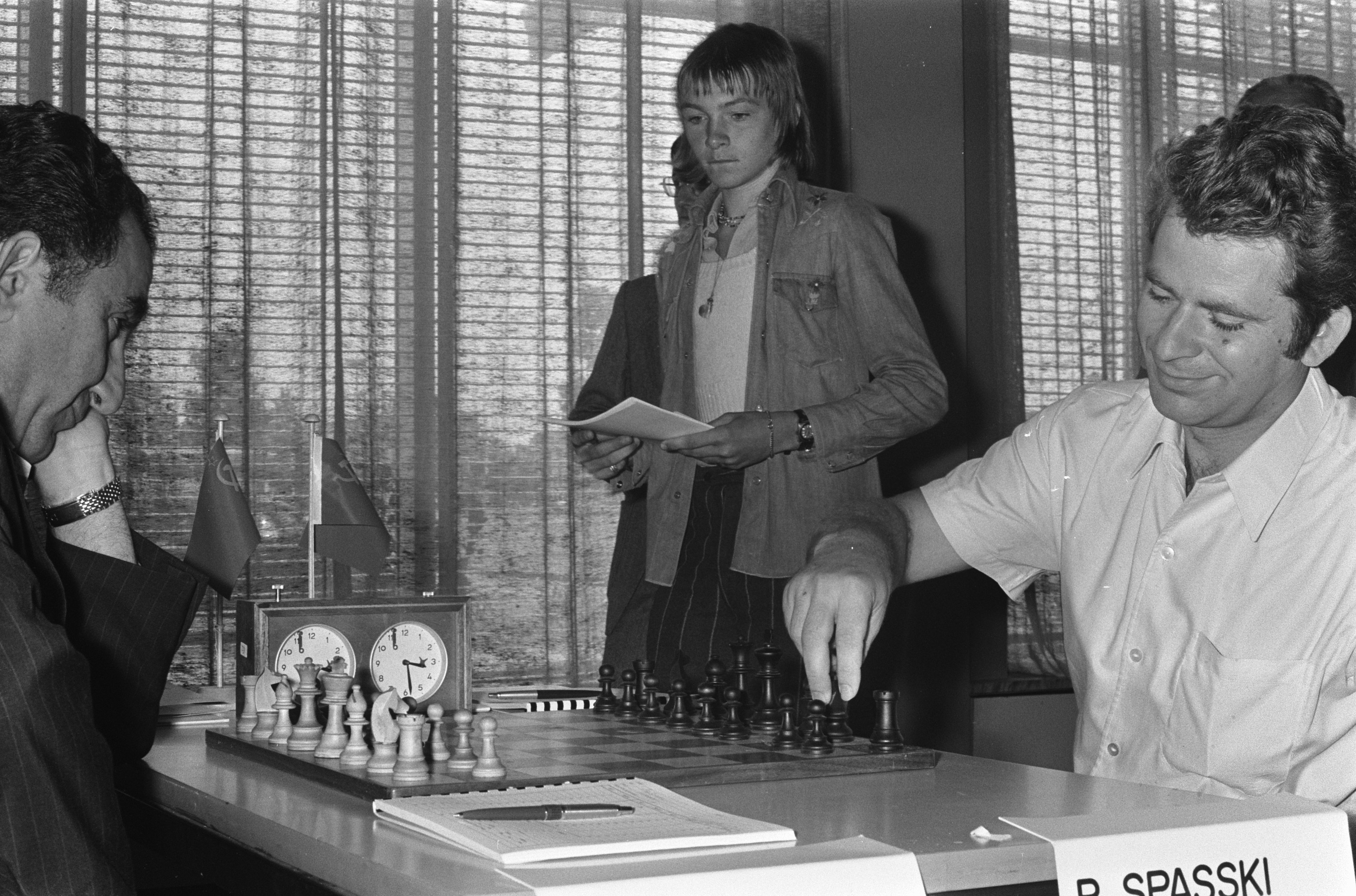
Boris Spassky playing Tigran Petrosian

== Table and results ==
41st USSR Chess Championship
N°	Jogador	1	2	3	4	5	6	7	8	9	10	11	12	13	14	15	16	17	18	Total
1	(Soviet Union) Boris Spassky	-	½	½	½	½	½	½	½	½	1	0	½	1	1	1	1	1	1	11½
2	(Soviet Union) Anatoly Karpov	½	-	0	½	1	1	½	½	½	½	1	½	½	1	½	½	½	1	10½
3	(Soviet Union) Tigran Petrosian	½	1	-	½	½	½	½	½	½	½	½	1	½	½	½	½	1	1	10½
4	(Soviet Union) Lev Polugaevsky	½	½	½	-	½	½	½	1	½	½	½	1	½	1	½	½	½	1	10½
5	(Soviet Union) Viktor Korchnoi	½	0	½	½	-	½	½	½	½	½	1	½	1	1	½	1	1	½	10½
6	(Soviet Union) Gennadi Kuzmin	½	0	½	½	½	-	½	½	½	1	½	½	1	½	1	1	1	½	10½
7	(Soviet Union) Efim Geller	½	½	½	½	½	½	-	½	1	0	½	½	0	½	½	1	1	0	8½
8	(Soviet Union) Karen Grigorian	½	½	½	0	½	½	½	-	½	½	1	1	1	½	½	0	0	½	8½
9	(Soviet Union) Paul Keres	½	½	½	½	½	½	0	½	-	½	½	0	½	½	½	½	½	1	8
10	(Soviet Union) Mark Taimanov	0	½	½	½	½	0	1	½	½	-	½	1	½	0	½	½	½	½	8
11	(Soviet Union) Vladimir Savon	1	0	½	½	0	½	½	0	½	½	-	½	½	½	½	½	½	1	8
12	(Soviet Union) Mikhail Tal	½	½	0	0	½	½	½	0	1	0	½	-	½	½	1	½	½	1	8
13	(Soviet Union) Vladimir Tukmakov	0	½	½	½	0	0	1	0	½	½	½	½	-	½	½	½	½	1	7½
14	(Soviet Union) Nukhim Rashkovsky	0	0	½	0	0	½	½	½	½	1	½	½	½	-	½	½	½	1	7½
15	(Soviet Union) Orest Averkin	0	½	½	½	½	0	½	½	½	½	½	0	½	½	-	½	0	1	7
16	(Soviet Union) Vassily Smyslov	0	½	½	½	0	0	0	1	½	½	½	½	½	½	½	-	½	½	7
17	(Soviet Union) Evgeny Sveshnikov	0	½	0	½	0	0	0	1	½	½	½	½	½	½	1	½	-	0	6½
18	(Soviet Union) Alexander Beliavsky	0	0	0	0	½	½	1	½	0	½	0	0	0	0	0	½	1	-	4½
