= World Chess Championship 1966 =

Chess match between Tigran Petrosian and Boris Spassky

	Defending champion	Challenger
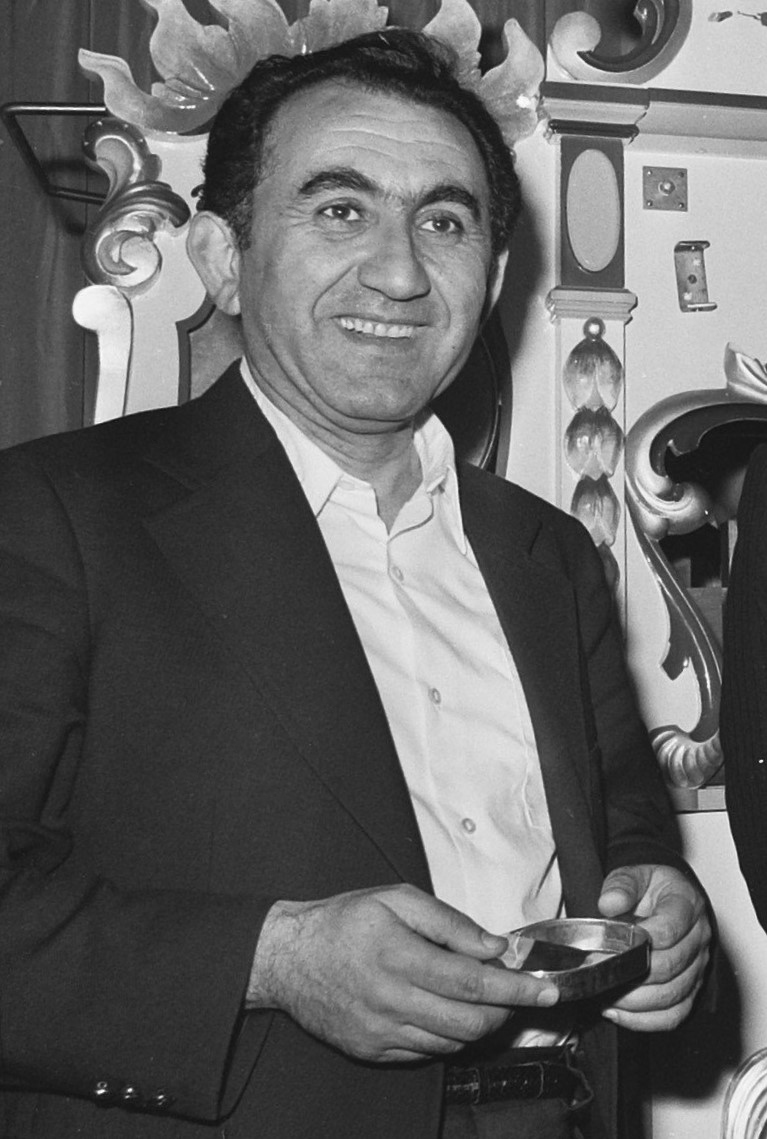
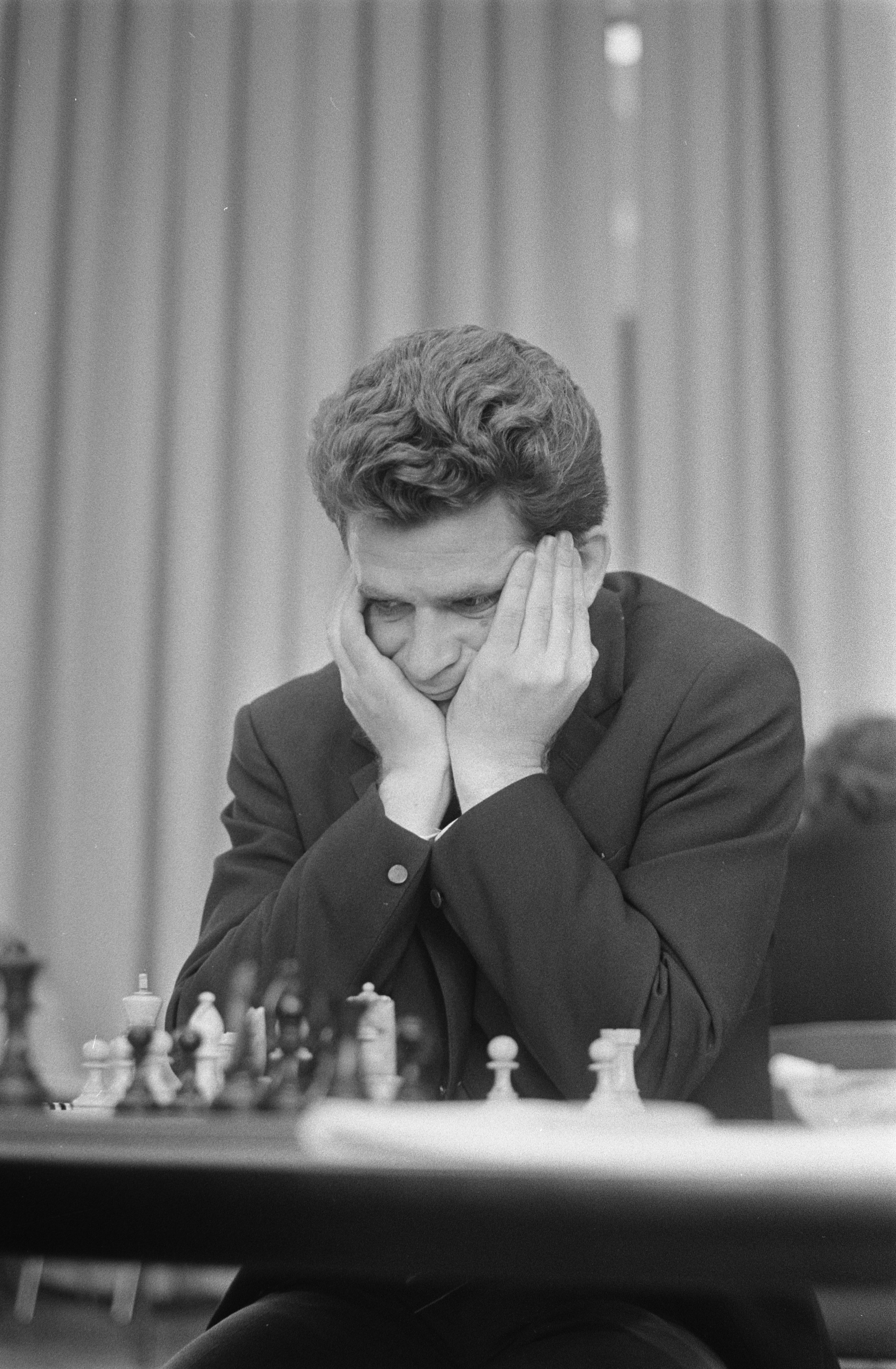
	Tigran Petrosian	Boris Spassky
	(Soviet Union) Tigran Petrosian	(Soviet Union) Boris Spassky
12½	Scores	11½
	Born 17 June 1929; 36 years old	Born 30 January 1937; 29 years old
	Winner of the 1963 World Chess Championship	Winner of the 1965 Candidates Tournament

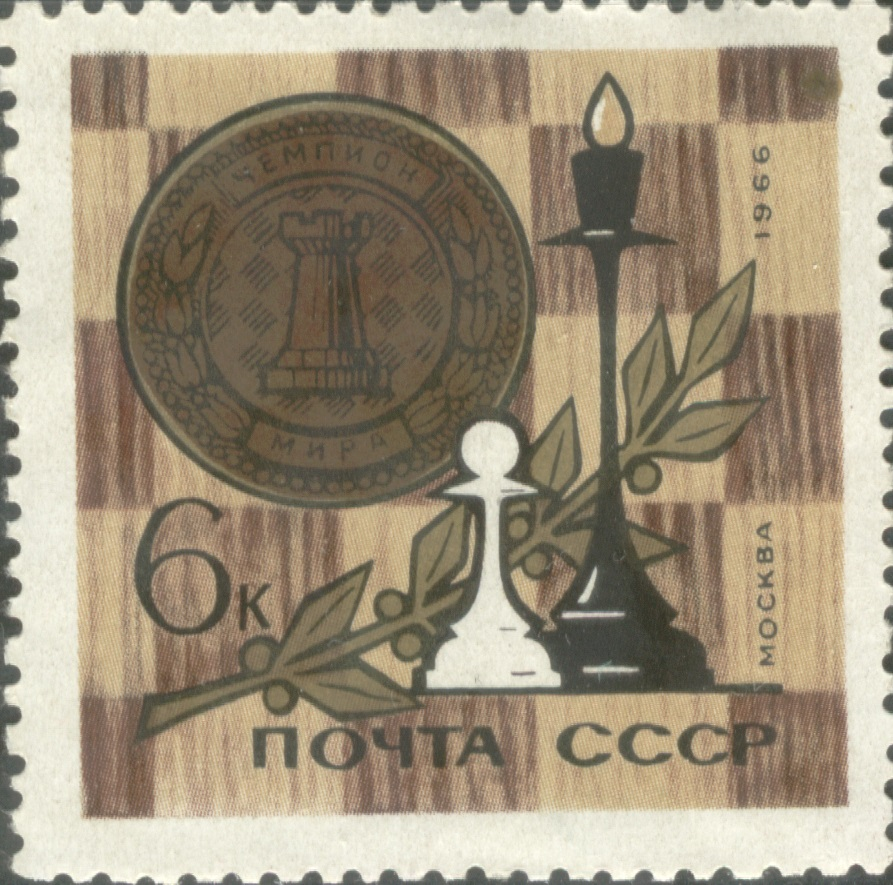
A Soviet stamp dedicated to the World Chess Championship 1966

A World Chess Championship was played between Tigran Petrosian and Boris Spassky in Moscow from April 9 to June 9, 1966. Petrosian won.

== 1964 Interzonal Tournament ==
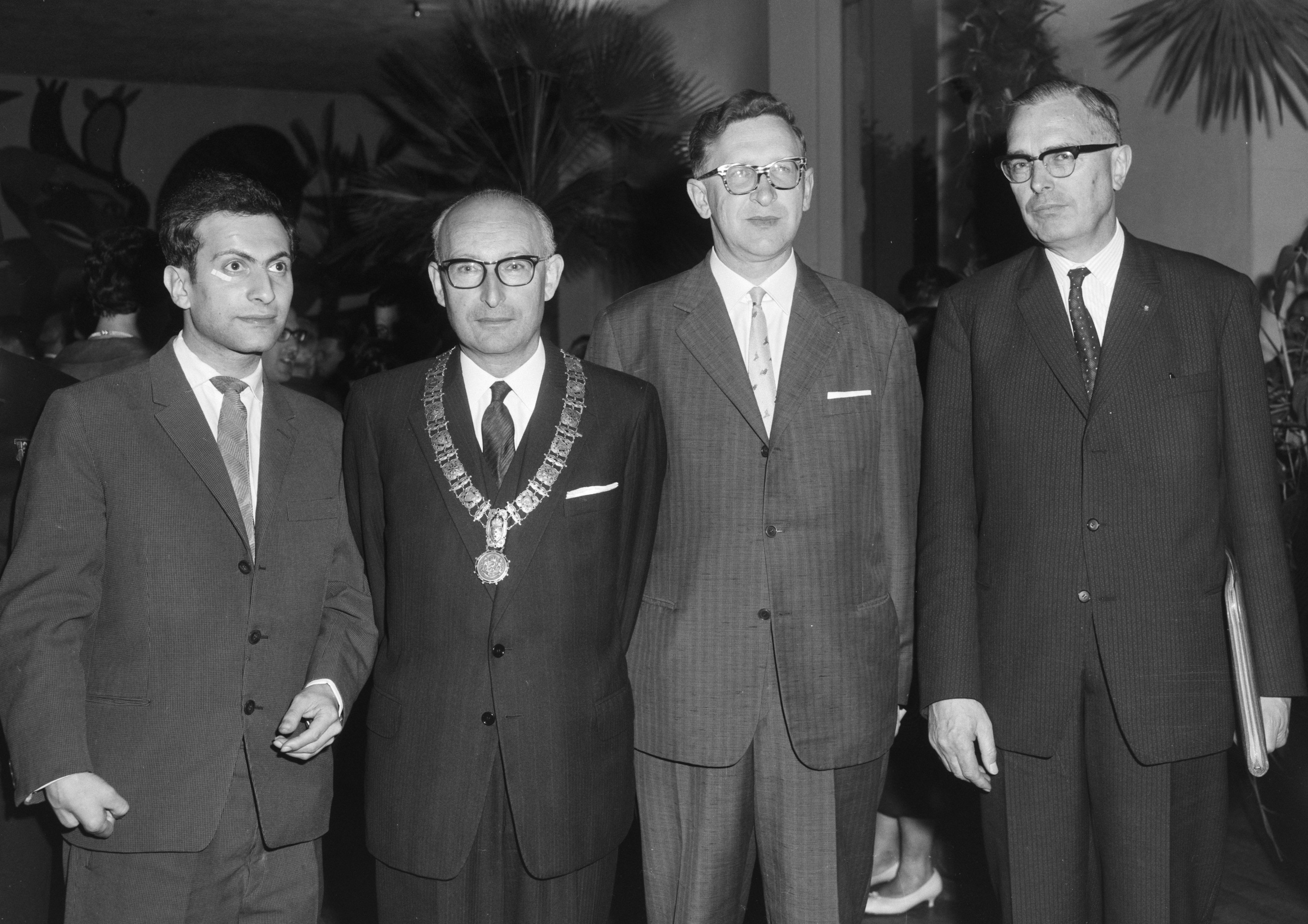
Opening of the interzonal tournament in Amsterdam. Left-right: Mikhail Tal, R. van den Bergh (city official), Vasily Smyslov and Max Euwe

An interzonal tournament was held in Amsterdam in the Netherlands in May and June 1964. Six spots in the Candidates tournament were on the line.

1964 Interzonal Tournament
		1	2	3	4	5	6	7	8	9	10	11	12	13	14	15	16	17	18	19	20	21	22	23	24	Total
1	Vasily Smyslov (Soviet Union)	–	½	½	½	½	½	½	½	1	1	1	1	½	1	½	½	½	½	1	1	1	1	1	1	17
2	Bent Larsen (Denmark)	½	–	1	½	0	1	0	½	1	½	1	1	1	½	½	½	1	1	½	1	1	1	1	1	17
3	Boris Spassky (Soviet Union)	½	0	–	½	½	½	½	1	1	1	0	½	1	½	1	1	½	1	1	1	1	1	1	1	17
4	Mikhail Tal (Soviet Union)	½	½	½	–	½	½	½	½	½	½	½	½	1	1	1	1	½	1	1	1	1	1	1	1	17
5	Leonid Stein (Soviet Union)	½	1	½	½	–	0	1	½	0	1	½	1	½	1	1	1	1	½	½	½	1	1	1	1	16½
6	David Bronstein (Soviet Union)	½	0	½	½	1	–	½	½	½	½	1	½	½	1	½	½	1	1	1	½	1	1	1	1	16
7	Borislav Ivkov (Yugoslavia)	½	1	½	½	0	½	–	½	½	½	0	1	1	½	½	½	½	1	1	1	½	1	1	1	15
8	Samuel Reshevsky (United States)	½	½	0	½	½	½	½	–	½	½	½	½	½	1	½	½	1	½	½	1	1	1	1	1	14½
9	Lajos Portisch (Hungary)	0	0	0	½	1	½	½	½	–	½	0	½	½	1	1	1	½	1	½	1	1	1	1	1	14½
10	Svetozar Gligorić (Yugoslavia)	0	½	0	½	0	½	½	½	½	–	½	1	1	½	1	½	1	½	1	1	0	1	1	1	14
11	Klaus Darga (West Germany)	0	0	1	½	½	0	1	½	1	½	–	0	½	1	½	1	½	½	1	1	½	½	1	½	13½
12	Levente Lengyel (Hungary)	0	0	½	½	0	½	0	½	½	0	1	–	½	½	1	½	1	½	½	1	1	1	1	1	13
13	Luděk Pachman (Czechoslovakia)	½	0	0	0	½	½	0	½	½	0	½	½	–	½	1	½	1	1	1	1	1	1	½	½	12½
14	Larry Evans (United States)	0	½	½	0	0	0	½	0	0	½	0	½	½	–	1	½	0	1	1	1	½	½	1	½	10
15	Georgi Tringov (Bulgaria)	½	½	0	0	0	½	½	½	0	0	½	0	0	0	–	½	1	½	½	1	½	½	1	1	9½
16	Pal Benko (United States)	½	½	0	0	0	½	½	½	0	½	0	½	½	½	½	–	½	0	1	0	1	½	½	½	9
17	Héctor Rossetto (Argentina)	½	0	½	½	0	0	½	0	½	0	½	0	0	1	0	½	–	½	½	½	0	1	0	1	8
18	Alberto Foguelman (Argentina)	½	0	0	0	½	0	0	½	0	½	½	½	0	0	½	1	½	–	0	0	1	1	0	1	8
19	István Bilek (Hungary)	0	½	0	0	½	0	0	½	½	0	0	½	0	0	½	0	½	1	–	½	1	1	½	½	8
20	Oscar Quiñones (Peru)	0	0	0	0	½	½	0	0	0	0	0	0	0	0	0	1	½	1	½	–	½	1	½	1	7
21	Yosef Porat (Israel)	0	0	0	0	0	0	½	0	0	1	½	0	0	½	½	0	1	0	0	½	–	0	½	½	5½
22	Francisco José Pérez (Cuba)	0	0	0	0	0	0	0	0	0	0	½	0	0	½	½	½	0	0	0	0	1	–	1	1	5
23	Béla Berger (Australia)	0	0	0	0	0	0	0	0	0	0	0	0	½	0	0	½	1	1	½	½	½	0	–	0	4½
24	Zvonko Vranesic (Canada)	0	0	0	0	0	0	0	0	0	0	½	0	½	½	0	½	0	0	½	0	½	0	1	–	4

Since FIDE rules only allowed a maximum of three players from the same nation to qualify from the interzonal, Stein and Bronstein were ineligible. Instead Ivkov qualified. The sixth and final place in the Candidates Tournament was decided in a 4-game playoff in which Portisch beat Reshevsky 2½–½.

Bobby Fischer, the winner of the previous Interzonal in 1962, declined his invitation, despite qualifying by winning the 1963–64 US Championship.

== 1965 Candidates matches ==
After the controversy surrounding the previous Candidates tournament, the 1965 tournament was the first to be played as a knock-out series of matches.

Two players were seeded directly into the tournament: Mikhail Botvinnik (loser of the last championship match) and Paul Keres (2nd place in the 1962 Candidates). Botvinnik declined, and his place was taken by Efim Geller, who finished 3rd in the 1962 Candidates.

Quarterfinals
Riga, Apr 1965
(Soviet Union) Boris Spassky	6
(Soviet Union) Paul Keres	4
Moscow, Apr 1965
(Soviet Union) Vasily Smyslov	2½
(Soviet Union) Efim Geller	5½
Bled, June–July 1965
(Denmark) Bent Larsen	5½
(Socialist Federal Republic of Yugoslavia) Borislav Ivkov	2½
Bled, June–July 1965
(Hungary) Lajos Portisch	2½
(Soviet Union) Mikhail Tal	5½

Semifinals
Riga, May–June 1965
(Soviet Union) Boris Spassky	5½
(Soviet Union) Efim Geller	2½
Bled, July–Aug 1965
(Denmark) Bent Larsen	4½
(Soviet Union) Mikhail Tal	5½

Final
Tbilisi, Nov 1965
(Soviet Union) Boris Spassky	7
(Soviet Union) Mikhail Tal	4
Third place
(Denmark) Bent Larsen	5
(Soviet Union) Efim Geller	4

Spassky won, earning the right to challenge champion Petrosian for the title.

Larsen and Geller played a third place playoff in Copenhagen, Denmark in March 1966. Larsen won 5–4.

== 1966 Championship match ==
The match was played as best of 24 games, with the champion (Petrosian) retaining the title in the event of a 12–12 tie.

While Petrosian retained the title with a 12–10 lead after Game 22, he and Spassky decided to play the final two games anyway.

This was the first World Chess Championship match since 1934 in which the reigning World Chess Champion defeated his opponent. (World champion Botvinnik retained his title in drawn matches in 1951 and 1954.)

World Chess Championship Match 1966
	1	2	3	4	5	6	7	8	9	10	11	12	13	14	15	16	17	18	19	20	21	22	23	24	Points
Tigran Petrosian (Soviet Union)	½	½	½	½	½	½	1	½	½	1	½	½	0	½	½	½	½	½	0	1	½	1	0	½	12½
Boris Spassky (Soviet Union)	½	½	½	½	½	½	0	½	½	0	½	½	1	½	½	½	½	½	1	0	½	0	1	½	11½
