= Vlastimil Hort =

Czech and German chess grandmaster (1944–2025)

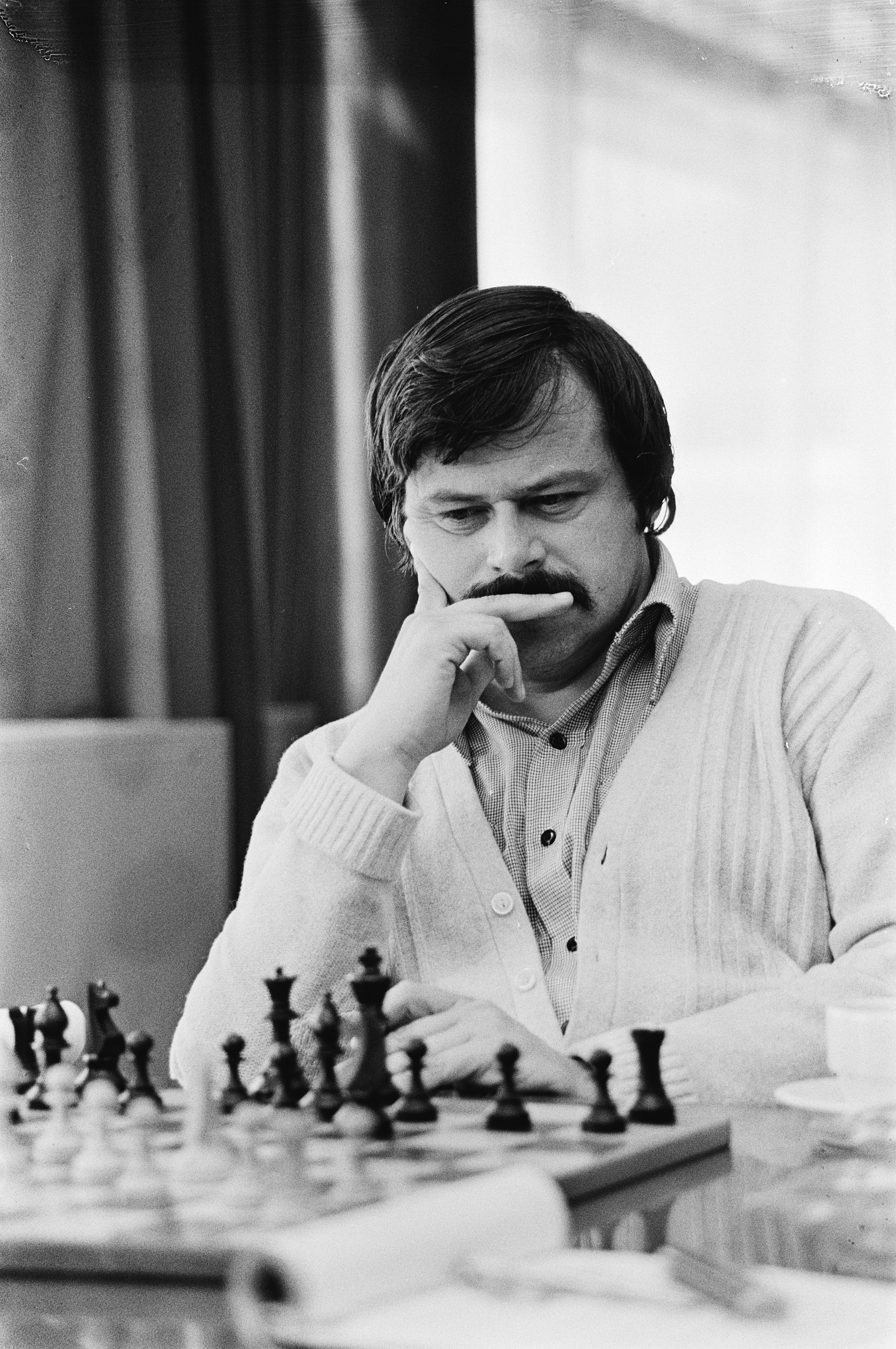
- Hort in 1979

Personal information
- Born: 12 January 1944 Kladno, Protectorate of Bohemia and Moravia
- Died: 12 May 2025 (aged 81) Eitorf, Germany

Chess career
- Country: Czechoslovakia (until 1985); West Germany (1985–1990); Germany (from 1990)
- Title: Grandmaster (1965)
- Peak rating: 2620 (January 1977)
- Peak ranking: No. 6 (January 1977)

Vlastimil Hort (12 January 1944 – 12 May 2025) was a Czechoslovak and German chess grandmaster. During the 1960s and 1970s he was one of the world's strongest players and reached the 1977–78 Candidates Tournament for the World Chess Championship, but never qualified for a competition for the actual title.

Hort was a citizen of Czechoslovakia for the first part of his chess career. He achieved the Grandmaster title in 1965. He won a number of major international tournaments (Hastings 1967–68, Skopje 1969, etc.) and national championships (1970, 1971, 1972, 1975, and 1977). He gained recognition as one of the strongest non-Soviet players in the world, which led to him being a representative of the "World" team in the great "USSR vs. Rest of the World" match of 1970, where he occupied fourth board and had an undefeated +1 score against the Soviet grandmaster Lev Polugaevsky—in some respects his greatest result. He defected to the West in 1985, moving to West Germany and winning the national championship of his new homeland in 1987, 1989, and 1991.

== Chess career ==
=== Zonals and interzonals ===
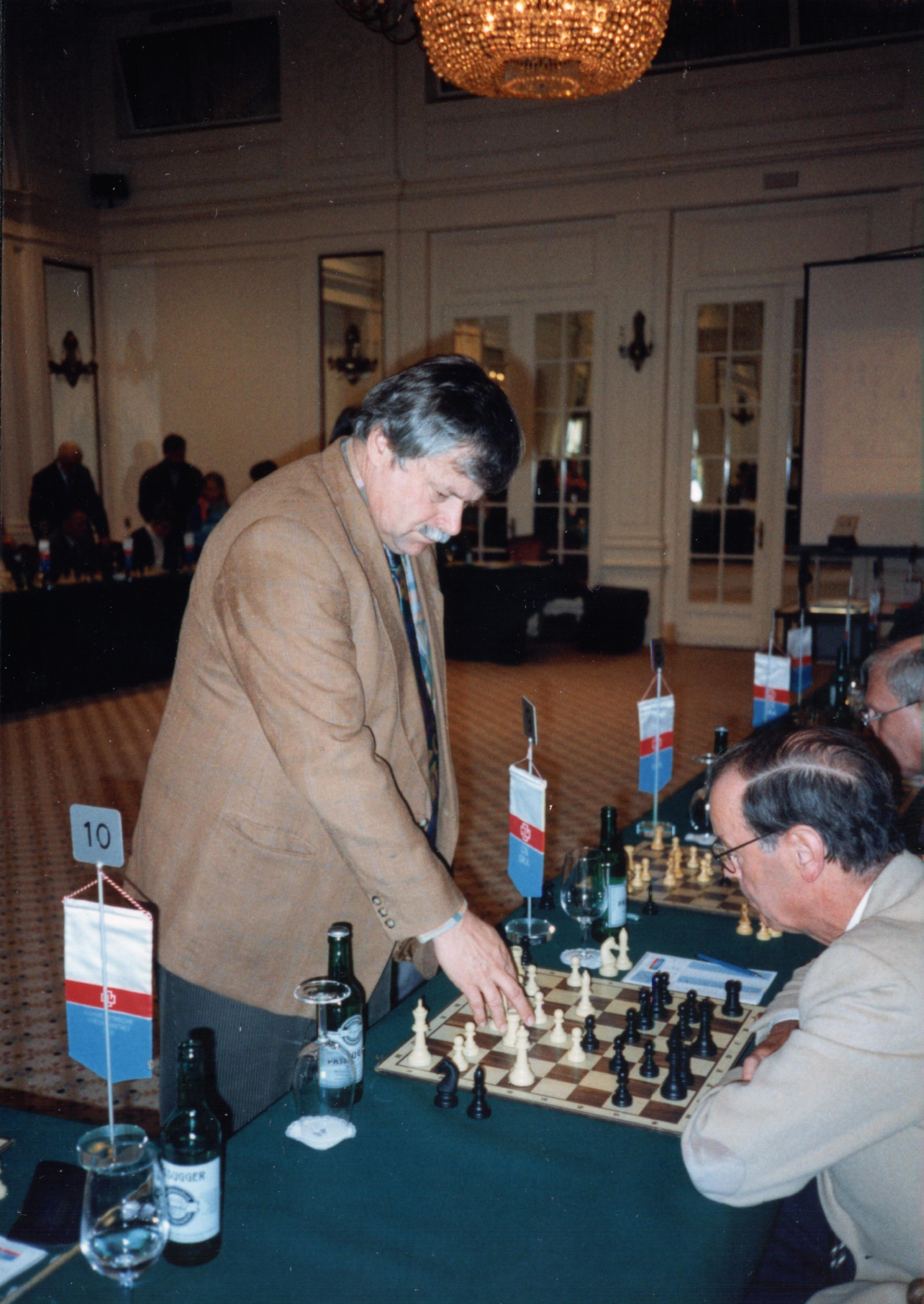
Grandmaster Hort giving a simultaneous exhibition, 1997

Hort participated in a number of Zonal and Interzonal qualifying tournaments to select a challenger for the world title, generally with good results but without reaching the final stages of the Candidates process.

=== Sousse Interzonal 1967 ===
The 1967 Interzonal tournament at Sousse included among its participants both Hort and the great but volatile Bobby Fischer. While leading the tournament, Fischer was involved in a dispute with the tournament organizers over the playing schedule; this resulted in his forfeiting a game with the Soviet player Aivars Gipslis. While accounts of subsequent events differ, it is clear that Fischer was persuaded to resume play, but then did not appear for his game with Hort, who was awarded a victory by forfeit. Negotiations with the organizers went downhill from this point, and Fischer withdrew from the tournament to begin his penultimate estrangement from grandmaster chess. Hort went on to finish the Interzonal in a tie for sixth place with Samuel Reshevsky and Leonid Stein, but did not advance to the Candidates matches, Reshevsky becoming the successful Candidate following a three-way tie-breaking match.

=== Candidates matches 1977–78 ===
He reached the stage of the Candidates matches of 1977–78 but was eliminated in the first round, in a close match versus the former world champion Boris Spassky.

Hort's long-standing reputation as one of the great sportsmen of chess was enhanced by an event during this match. During the latter stages of the competition, Spassky fell ill and was unable to play. During Candidates matches, each player was allotted a fixed number of rest days to accommodate such situations, but Spassky exhausted his entire allocation of time-outs yet was still unable to compete. At this point Hort could have claimed the match won by forfeit; however, he offered Spassky one of his own time-outs so that the ex-champion could complete his recovery. Spassky did so and went on to win the match by the narrowest possible margin, eliminating Hort from that Candidates cycle.

In the penultimate game of the match Hort had established a clearly winning position, but forgot about the clock, and sat thinking until his time elapsed, handing the win to Spassky. With a draw in the next and final game, Spassky won the match. On the following day Hort gave what was then a world-record simultaneous exhibition in which he took on over 600 opponents. He explained that he gave the exhibition in order to get the loss against Spassky out of his head.

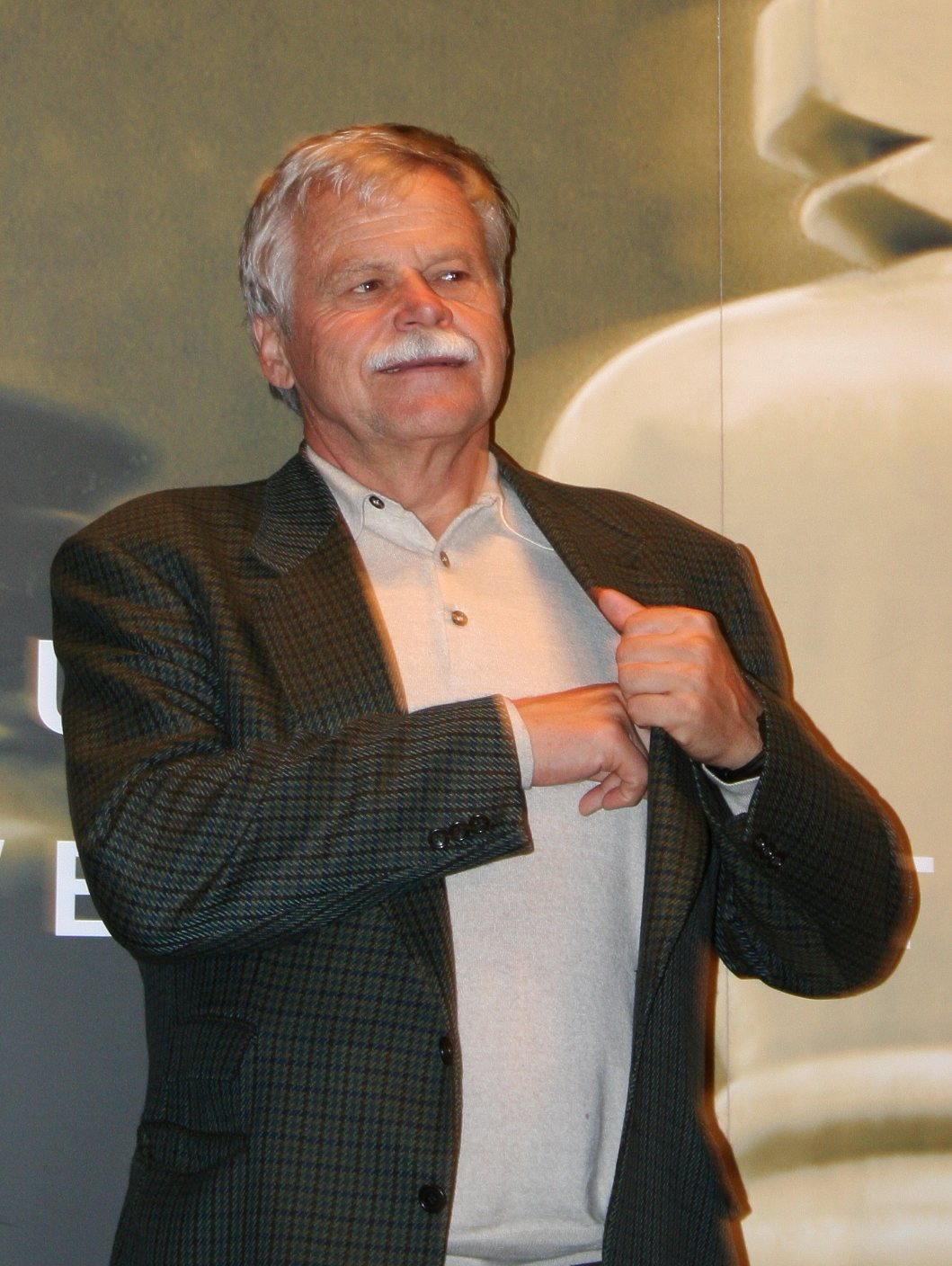
Hort in 2005

=== Olympiad career ===
Hort played for Czechoslovakia in the Chess Olympiads of 1960, 1962, 1964, 1966, 1968, 1970, 1972, 1974, 1980, 1982, 1984, and for Germany in 1988, 1990, 1992.

=== Simultaneous play ===
In 1985, he played a simultaneous exhibition against 636 opponents in Cologne, which earned him an entry in The Guinness Book of Records.

=== Later career ===
Hort appeared numerous times as chess commentator alongside grandmaster Helmut Pfleger on German TV. Despite advancing age he remained an active tournament competitor, representing the unified Germany and, among other things, playing on "Veterans" teams in Scheveningen system matches against teams of Women Grandmasters. In 2006, he became Senior World Champion in Chess960. In August 2023, his FIDE rating was 2325.

In a poll to decide the best Czechoslovak player of the century, Hort came in second place (after Richard Réti).

== Personal life and death ==
Hort was born on 12 January 1944 in Kladno in the Protectorate of Bohemia and Moravia (now the Czech Republic). He defected to West Germany in 1985, whilst playing in a tournament in Tunisia.

Hort died at his home in Eitorf, Germany, on 12 May 2025, from complications of diabetes, from which he had suffered for 30 years. He was 81. His funeral was held on 24 May.

== Writings ==
Alekhine's Defense, by Vlastimil Hort, publisher Batsford, London, 1981. Contains additional material on Owen's Defense and the Nimzowitsch Defense, both by Raymond Keene.

== Notable games ==
The following game from the 1967 Zonal tournament (qualifying event for the Sousse Interzonal) held at Halle, East Germany, which well illustrates Hort's capacity for converting a positional initiative into a winning attack. His opponent in this game, Dragoljub Minić, was a prominent Yugoslav International Master (later Grandmaster). In the final position White simultaneously threatens two checkmates, 29.Nf4 and 29.Qxh4. The only way for Black to avoid both is by capturing the queen, in which case White elegantly wins with 29.Nf4+ Kh4 30.g3+! and checkmate next move.

Hort vs. Minić, Halle 1967

Position: a8 black rook, a7 black pawn, b7 black pawn, g7 white rook, e6 black bishop, f6 black knight, g6 white knight, h6 black pawn, c5 black pawn, f5 black pawn, h5 black king, c4 white pawn, h4 black queen, h3 white queen, a2 white pawn, b2 white pawn, f2 white pawn, g2 white pawn, h2 white pawn, g1 white king

Final position after 28.Ng6

Hort vs. Minić, Halle 1967; King's Indian Defense (ECO E75)
1.d4 Nf6 2.c4 g6 3.Nc3 Bg7 4.e4 d6 5.Be2 0-0 6.Bg5 c5 7.d5 h6 8.Be3 Kh7 9.Nf3 Re8 10.0-0 Nbd7 11.Qc2 e6 12.dxe6 Rxe6 13.Rad1 Qe7 14.Rfe1 Nxe4 15.Nd5 Qd8 16.Bd3 f5 17.Nf4 Re8 18.Bxe4 Rxe4 19.Rxd6 Qc7 20.Rxg6 Rxf4 21.Bxf4 Qxf4 22.Rxg7+ Kxg7 23.Qc3+ Nf6 24.Re7+ Kg6 25.Ne5+ Kh5 26.Rg7 Be6 27.Qh3+ Qh4 28.Ng6 1–0
