= Leonid Stein =

Soviet chess grandmaster (1934–1973)

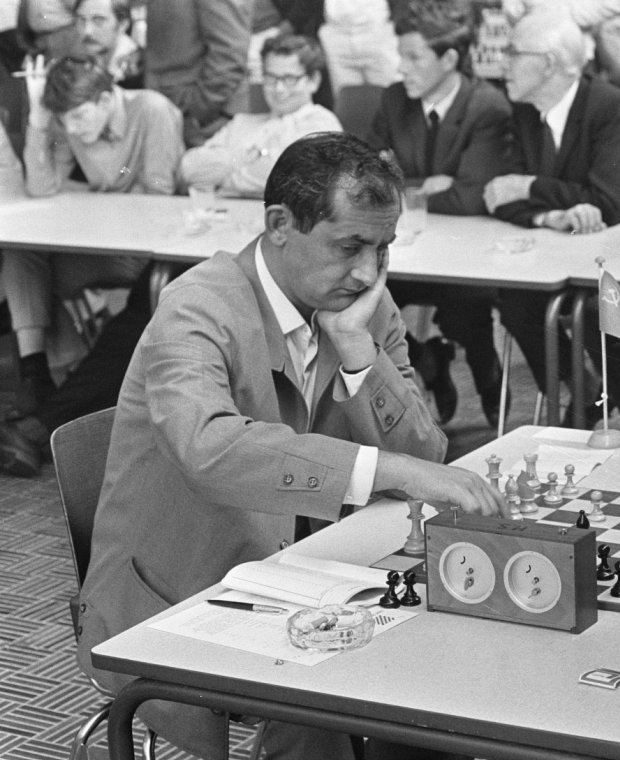
- Leonid Stein in 1969

Personal information
- Born: Leonid Zakharovich Stein; November 12, 1934 Kamianets-Podilskyi, Ukrainian SSR, Soviet Union
- Died: July 4, 1973 (aged 38) Moscow, Russian SFSR, Soviet Union

Chess career
- Country: Soviet Union
- Title: Grandmaster (1962)
- Peak rating: 2620 (July 1972)
- Peak ranking: No. 11 (July 1972)

Leonid Zakharovych Stein (Ukrainian: Леонід Захарович Штейн; November 12, 1934 – July 4, 1973) was a Soviet chess Grandmaster. He won three USSR Chess Championships in the 1960s (1963, 1965, and 1966), and was among the world's top ten players during that era.

== Early life ==
Leonid Stein, a Jewish Ukrainian, was born in Kamenets-Podolsky.

While serving in the Soviet Army, he tied for 1st place in the individual Army Championship in both 1955 and 1956.

He achieved the National Master title at the relatively late age of 24, but, as his Army titles against strong competition attest, he was likely at that strength somewhat earlier. At 24, he competed for the first time in the Soviet Championship, held in Tbilisi, 1959. In the following year, he won the Ukrainian Championship at Kiev, and won it again in 1962. He was assigned the top board of the Soviet team at the Helsinki 1961 Student Olympiad, and scored a strong result of +8, =3, −1, helping the team to the gold medal.

== Grandmaster and Soviet Champion ==
Stein tied for third place in the 1961 Soviet Championship, at Moscow, defeating Tigran Petrosian on the way. He won his first Soviet title at Leningrad 1963; he tied with Boris Spassky and Ratmir Kholmov in the tournament itself, then won the playoff. He won again at Tallinn, 1965, and repeated the next year, 1966, at Tbilisi. Two outstanding international tournament victories were attained at Moscow 1967 (commemorating the 50th anniversary of the 1917 October Revolution), and Moscow 1971 (Alekhine Memorial, equal with Anatoly Karpov). Both of the Moscow tournaments were considered to be among the strongest tournaments in chess history up to that time. Further international tournament victories were scored at Sarajevo (Bosna) 1967, equal with Borislav Ivkov, Hastings 1967–68, shared, Kecskemét 1968, Tallinn 1969, Pärnu 1971, and Las Palmas 1973, equal with Tigran Petrosian. From 1963 to his premature death in 1973, Stein was in the top ten players in the world, or just outside that range.

== World title challenge frustrations ==
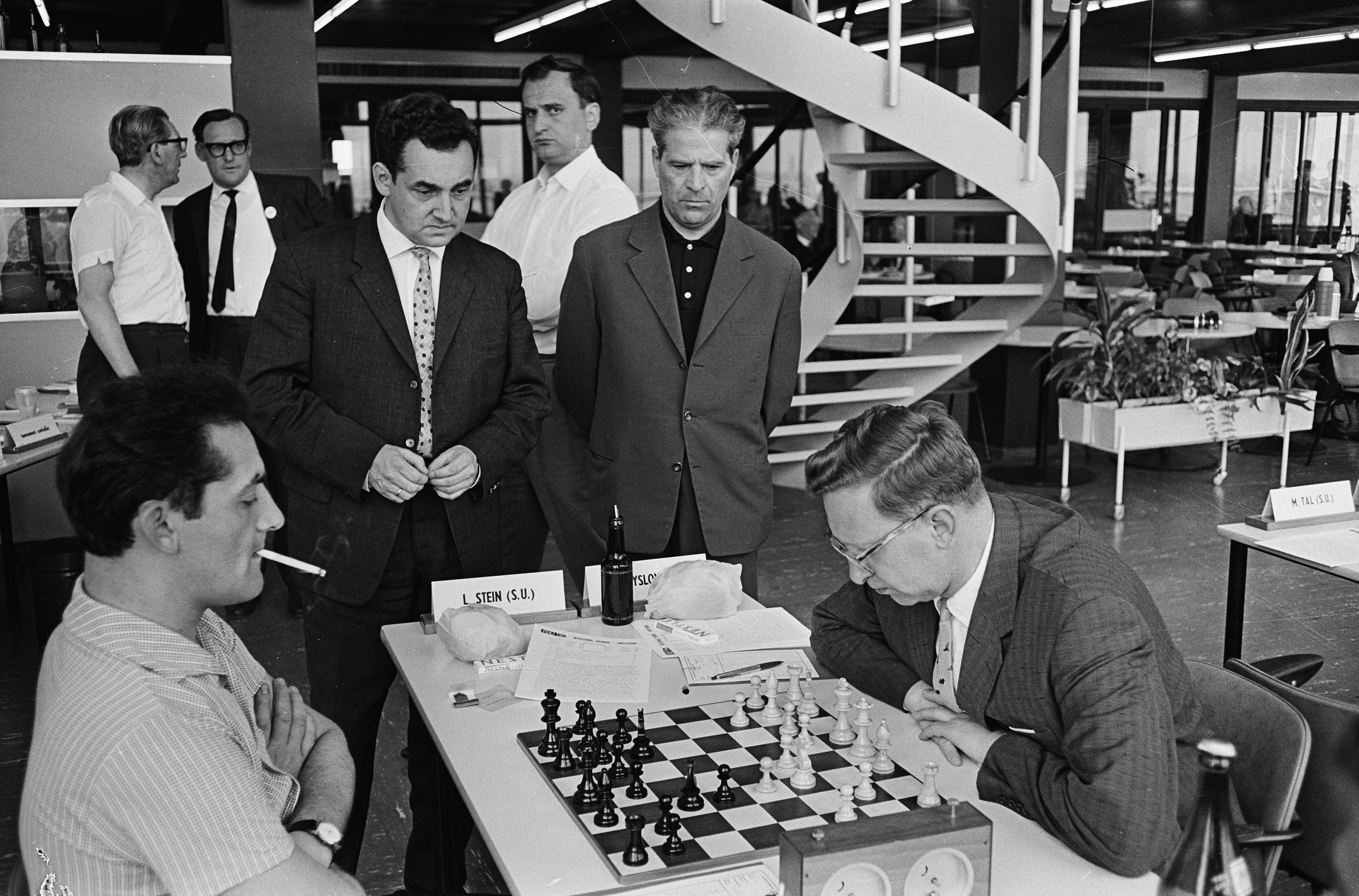
Amsterdam Interzonal 1964. From left to right: Leonid Stein, Mark Taimanov, Borislav Ivkov, Andor Lilienthal and Vasili Smyslov.

With his strong result at the 1961 Soviet Championship, he earned the right to play in the 1962 Stockholm Interzonal tournament. His play there was excellent, finishing in a tie for 6th–7th places, but he was denied the right to advance to the Candidates' Tournament, because of a FIDE rule then in force which limited the qualifiers from any one country to three (in this case USSR). He had finished behind fellow Soviets Efim Geller, Petrosian, and Viktor Korchnoi. Despite winning a 3-way playoff against Pal Benko and Svetozar Gligorić for the 6th and final spot, due to the aforementioned Soviets finishing ahead of him, Stein was denied the final spot and Benko was awarded it instead.

A very similar occurrence was the story of the next Interzonal tournament, in Amsterdam 1964. Stein took fifth place, sufficient for qualification for any non-Soviet player, with an outstanding total of 16½ / 23, but was blocked from advancement. He had finished behind fellow Soviets Mikhail Tal, Vasily Smyslov, and Boris Spassky, who, along with Danish GM Bent Larsen, had all scored 17 points. He did represent the USSR at the Tel Aviv Olympiad that year, scoring a fine 10/13, and winning an individual gold medal on the first reserve board. Again, he was in the Soviet side at the Havana Olympiad 1966, scoring 9/12, winning an individual silver medal on board four. Both times, the Soviet Union won the team gold medals.

Again, in 1967, Stein qualified for the Sousse Interzonal, scored well, in a tie for 6th–8th places, but had to undergo a further playoff with Samuel Reshevsky and Vlastimil Hort, in Los Angeles, which was won by Reshevsky.

He was on the Soviet side for the European team championships at Hamburg 1965 and Kapfenberg 1970, both of which were victorious. He served as an alternate on the Soviet team for the Match of the Century against the Rest of the World team, at Belgrade 1970. He played one game, losing to Larsen.

Stein had already qualified for the 1973 Petropolis Interzonal, and was considered a potential favorite to win the entire Candidates' cycle

== Death ==
He died of a heart attack at the age of 38 at the Rossiya Hotel in Moscow as he prepared to leave for the European chess championships in Bath, England. At the time of death, he was still considered as one of the main contenders for World Championship. He was buried in Kiev, in his native Ukraine. His widow and children currently live in US.

== Style and legacy ==
Stein's creative style was greatly influenced by Chigorin and Alekhine. He was a highly intuitive, natural player. He was considered to be a brilliant attacking genius, but nevertheless played very sound chess, being less willing than Tal to complicate with unforeseeable results. He excelled in sharp openings such as the King's Indian systems with both colors, the Grünfeld Defence, and the Sicilian Defence.

He was one of few players who had an even score against Vasily Smyslov, Tigran Petrosian, and Mikhail Botvinnik. He had plus records against Mikhail Tal, Boris Spassky, and Paul Keres. Stein defeated many of the top players of his era.

== Notable games ==
- Nikolay Krogius vs Leonid Stein, Ukrainian Championship, Kiev 1960, King's Indian Defence, Petrosian Variation (E92), 0–1 Stein was a terror in the King's Indian, and shows it here.
- Leonid Stein vs Tigran Petrosian, USSR Championship, Moscow 1961, French Defence, Winawer Variation (C18), 1–0 Stein takes off the world champion-to-be in devastating fashion.
- Leonid Stein vs Mikhail Tal, USSR Club Championship Team finals, Moscow 1961, Sicilian Defence, Najdorf Variation (B94), 1–0 Former world champion Tal has to concede defeat in an ultra-sharp game.
- Leonid Stein vs Lajos Portisch, Stockholm Interzonal 1962, Sicilian Defence, Kan Variation (B42), 1–0 Stein unleashes a nasty knight sacrifice to tear open Black's king position.
- Boris Spassky vs Leonid Stein, USSR Championship, Leningrad 1964, Grunfeld Defence (D86), 0–1 Another world champion-to-be meets his match in Leonid Stein.
- Mikhail Botvinnik vs Leonid Stein, Moscow 1965, Ruy Lopez, Delayed Exchange Variation (C85), 0–1 Yet another former world champion may have wished he had stayed home.
- Leonid Stein vs Pal Benko, Caracas 1970, Sicilian Defence, Lasker Variation (B33), 1–0 Black's opening play was daring and was refuted in precise fashion.
- Leonid Stein vs Vasily Smyslov, Moscow 1972, English Opening (A17), 1–0 Smyslov, a master of quiet positional play, has few answers for Stein's tactics.
- Ljubomir Ljubojevic vs Leonid Stein, Las Palmas 1973, Nimzo-Larsen Opening (A01), 0–1 Two skilled tacticians go toe-to-toe, and Stein comes out on top, after slipping in a surprise knight sacrifice in the opening.

== See also ==
- List of Jewish chess players
