= 1966 SFR Yugoslavia Chess Championship =

21st edition of SFR Yugoslav Chess Championship

21st SFR Yugoslavia Chess Championship
- Location: Titograd

Champions
- Svetozar Gligorić

The 1966 SFR Yugoslavia Chess Championship was the 21st edition of SFR Yugoslav Chess Championship. Held in Titograd, SFR Yugoslavia, SR Montenegro, between 24 November and 19 December 1965. The tournament was won by Svetozar Gligorić.

21st SFR Yugoslavia Chess Championship
N°	Player (age)	Wins	Draws	Losses	Total points
1	(Socialist Federal Republic of Yugoslavia) Svetozar Gligorić (43)	8	8	2	12
2	(Socialist Federal Republic of Yugoslavia) Bruno Parma (25)	5	13	0	11.5
3	(Socialist Federal Republic of Yugoslavia) Borislav Ivkov (33)	6	11	1	11.5
4	(Socialist Federal Republic of Yugoslavia) Mario Bertok (37)	4	13	1	10.5
5	(Socialist Federal Republic of Yugoslavia) Dragoljub Velimirović (24)	10	1	7	10.5
6	(Socialist Federal Republic of Yugoslavia) Milan Matulović (31)	5	10	3	10
7	(Socialist Federal Republic of Yugoslavia) Aleksandar Bradvarević (33)	4	12	2	10
8	(Socialist Federal Republic of Yugoslavia) Dragoljub Ćirić (31)	2	15	1	9.5
9	(Socialist Federal Republic of Yugoslavia) Dragoljub Minić (29)	3	13	2	9.5
10	(Socialist Federal Republic of Yugoslavia) Aleksandar Matanović (36)	3	12	3	9
11	(Socialist Federal Republic of Yugoslavia) Dušan Rajković (24)	4	9	5	8.5
12	(Socialist Federal Republic of Yugoslavia) Rajko Bogdanović (35)	3	10	5	8
13	(Socialist Federal Republic of Yugoslavia) Milorad Knežević (30)	3	10	5	8
14	(Socialist Federal Republic of Yugoslavia) Mišo Cebalo (21)	6	4	8	8
15	(Socialist Federal Republic of Yugoslavia) Rudolf Marić (39)	3	10	5	8
16	(Socialist Federal Republic of Yugoslavia) Jovan Sofrevski (31)	2	11	5	7.5
17	(Socialist Federal Republic of Yugoslavia) Stanimir Nikolić (31)	3	8	7	7
18	(Socialist Federal Republic of Yugoslavia) Ivan Buljovčić (30)	3	8	7	7
19	(Socialist Federal Republic of Yugoslavia) Idriz Sušić (30)	2	6	10	5
