= 1964 SFR Yugoslavia Chess Championship =

19th edition of SFR Yugoslav Chess Championship

19th SFR Yugoslavia Chess Championship
- Location: Zenica

Champions
- Borislav Ivkov and Mijo Udovčić

The 1964 SFR Yugoslavia Chess Championship was the 19th edition of SFR Yugoslav Chess Championship. Held in Zenica, SFR Yugoslavia, SR Bosnia & Herzegovina, between 26 November and 22 December 1963. The tournament was won by Borislav Ivkov and Mijo Udovčić.

14th SFR Yugoslavia Chess Championship
N°	Player (age)	Wins	Draws	Losses	Total points
1	(Socialist Federal Republic of Yugoslavia) Borislav Ivkov (31)	10	10	1	15
2	(Socialist Federal Republic of Yugoslavia) Mijo Udovčić (44)	9	12	0	15
3	(Socialist Federal Republic of Yugoslavia) Petar Trifunović (54)	7	13	1	13.5
4	(Socialist Federal Republic of Yugoslavia) Aleksandar Bradvarević (31)	7	13	1	13.5
5	(Socialist Federal Republic of Yugoslavia) Milan Matulović (29)	7	13	1	13.5
6	(Socialist Federal Republic of Yugoslavia) Bruno Parma (23)	7	12	2	13
7	(Socialist Federal Republic of Yugoslavia) Dragoljub Ćirić (29)	7	12	2	13
8	(Socialist Federal Republic of Yugoslavia) Dragoljub Janošević (41)	6	12	3	12
9	(Socialist Federal Republic of Yugoslavia) Mato Damjanović (37)	7	9	5	11.5
10	(Socialist Federal Republic of Yugoslavia) Dražen Marović (26)	5	13	3	11.5
11	(Socialist Federal Republic of Yugoslavia) Zvone Kržišnik (37)	6	11	4	11.5
12	(Socialist Federal Republic of Yugoslavia) Vasja Pirc (57)	2	16	3	10
13	(Socialist Federal Republic of Yugoslavia) Dragoljub Velimirović (22)	6	8	7	10
14	(Socialist Federal Republic of Yugoslavia) Stanimir Nikolić (29)	5	9	7	9.5
15	(Socialist Federal Republic of Yugoslavia) Vladimir Sokolov (31)	2	14	5	9
16	(Socialist Federal Republic of Yugoslavia) Mario Bertok (35)	3	12	6	9
17	(Socialist Federal Republic of Yugoslavia) Enver Bukić (27)	4	10	7	9
18	(Socialist Federal Republic of Yugoslavia) Rade Jovanić (34)	3	10	8	8
19	(Socialist Federal Republic of Yugoslavia) Zvonimir Meštrović (20)	5	4	12	7
20	(Socialist Federal Republic of Yugoslavia) Ljubomir Mašić (28)	4	5	12	6.5
21	(Socialist Federal Republic of Yugoslavia) Ilija Gojak (30)	2	8	11	6
22	(Socialist Federal Republic of Yugoslavia) Maksim Lutovac (28)	1	6	14	4
