= Chess matches of Russia and the Soviet Union against the rest of the World =

Historic chess tournament

There have been two chess matches featuring USSR vs. Rest of the World, in 1970 and 1984, and one match Russia vs. Rest of the World, in 2002. The USSR team won the first two matches and the "Rest of the World" team won the third match.

The first two matches were between a team from the USSR and a team of players from the "rest of the world". The third match (between Russia and the rest of the world) was the first to occur after the breakup of the Soviet Union, which meant that some countries that had been in the USSR for the first two matches were now on the "Rest of the World" team.

In all of the matches the teams consisted of ten members (plus some substitutes). In the first two matches, the teams were arranged in order (from board 1 through board 10) and each member from one team played four games against his equivalent on the other team. In the third match, each player played a game against ten different members of the other team (a Scheveningen system match), with a faster time control than the first two matches.

== Background ==
As the 20th century entered its final third, it was already apparent that the Soviet Union (USSR) had raised chess standards to a level to which other nations could only aspire. The USSR had produced an uninterrupted line of world champions stretching from 1948 to 1970. Since its earliest participation, the USSR had completely dominated team chess events such as the Chess Olympiad and European Team Championship. So pronounced was the gulf between the Soviet national side and their closest competitors, a sterner challenge was required to gauge the full extent of their supremacy. Such a challenge presented itself in 1970, when Max Euwe (the president of FIDE at the time) announced a match to pit the USSR's strength against the collective might of the rest of the world.

If the Soviets saw it as an opportunity to crown their glory, then the world camp were equally determined to show that the emergence of Bobby Fischer as a prospective world champion was symptomatic of a more widespread shift in the power base.

Although the Cold War dictated the political mood of the era, players from the Eastern Bloc, which was politically dominated by the Soviet Union, participated on the Rest of the World side in both matches, notably from Hungary and in the first match also from Czechoslovakia and East Germany, together with players from the Western Bloc and from non-aligned and neutral nations like Yugoslavia and Switzerland.

== First match, Belgrade 1970 ==
The first match occurred in Belgrade, March 29 – April 5, 1970 and was billed as "The Match of the Century – USSR versus the Rest of the World".

Ten team members played four games against their opposite number. Two reserves could be utilised to fill in on any board at the direction of the team captain.

Fischer vs. Petrosian

Max Euwe was the captain of the "Rest of the World" team and he announced the order of the team's players. For the first time, Arpad Elo's rating system was used to determine seeding and board order, except in the case of Larsen and Fischer. Larsen could not accept that Fischer's rating made him the World's Board 1 when Fischer's recent period of inactivity was contrasted with Larsen's recent successes. After many negotiations, and just as the developing disagreement appeared to be endangering the match, Fischer surprisingly agreed to step down to Board 2. The lineup was announced by Euwe well in advance of the match.

At the time of the match, many people in Belgrade speculated that the order of the Soviet players seemed as if it were arranged so that they would play against opponents whom they had a history of beating, such as in the annual USSR versus Yugoslavia matches. For instance, ex-world champion Mikhail Botvinnik was below Efim Geller and Mark Taimanov. The lineup matched Taimanov against Wolfgang Uhlmann, whom he "used to beat as he liked" and Botvinnik against Milan Matulović, who admitted to having a "Botvinnik complex", not playing well against him. People also questioned Paul Keres being on board 10, and wondered if his opponent being Borislav Ivkov had something to do with it. These suspicions were printed in Belgrade newspapers and the Russians replied with their reason for their team's selection: Current World Champion Boris Spassky must be first and his predecessor Tigran Petrosian must be second. Next comes Viktor Korchnoi, who played in the candidate's final match. Next came four players (Lev Polugaevsky, Geller, Vasily Smyslov, and Taimanov) who earned the right to play in the next Interzonal because of their place in the USSR Championship. The last three places were given to players of special merit – Botvinnik, Mikhail Tal, and Keres. The first reserve was Leonid Stein, who placed sixth in the USSR Championship, just behind those going to the Interzonal. The second reserve was David Bronstein, who once played in a world championship match (Andric 1970:298).

On paper, the match looked daunting for the World team as they were up against five world champions and a number of other players who had achieved good results in Candidates Tournaments. However, a terrific display of defiance from the World's top four boards almost tipped the balance and in the end, it was only the Soviets' strength in depth that won the day, by the narrowest of margins.

Lajos Portisch contributed a plus score for his side, but he incurred the wrath of Fischer when, in the last round, he inadvertently conceded a draw to Korchnoi by threefold repetition in a won position (Brady 1973:163). (See Threefold repetition#Portisch vs. Korchnoi, 1970). The game was regarded by many as crucial in determining the final match result, since the match would have been tied if Portisch had won the game. The Rest of the World team were also hindered by Samuel Reshevsky being unable to play his final round game against Smyslov because it fell on the Jewish Sabbath. His replacement, Fridrik Olafsson, was defeated.

The match was refereed by Božidar Kažić and each participant received a fee of $400. Fischer won a car for making the best result with the 'World' team. Two additional reserves, David Bronstein (USSR) and the West German Klaus Darga (Rest of the World), were not required.

Mikhail Tal's verdict in 64 (No. 17): "We won, but there are some reasons for concern: why are the foreign players making faster progress – at least in outward appearance? Why is the average age of our opponents lower than that of our national team? Why was there only one really strong chess tournament in the Soviet Union during the last years?"

=== Individual results, board by board ===
USSR vs. Rest of the World 1970
Bd	USSR Player	Republic	Elo	rd1	rd2	rd3	rd4	Score	World Player	Country	Elo	rd1	rd2	rd3	rd4	Score
1	Spassky	Russian SFSR	2670	½	1	0		1½/3	Larsen	Denmark	2650	½	0	1	1	2½/4
1	Stein	Ukrainian SSR	2620				0	0/1	Larsen	Denmark	2650	½	0	1	1	2½/4
2	Petrosian	Armenian SSR	2650	0	0	½	½	1/4	Fischer	United States	2720	1	1	½	½	3/4
3	Korchnoi	Russian SFSR	2670	½	½	0	½	1½/4	Portisch	Hungary	2630	½	½	1	½	2½/4
4	Polugaevsky	Byelorussian SSR	2640	0	½	½	½	1½/4	Hort	Czechoslovakia	2610	1	½	½	½	2½/4
5	Geller	Ukrainian SSR	2660	1	½	½	½	2½/4	Gligorić	Yugoslavia	2580	0	½	½	½	1½/4
6	Smyslov	Russian SFSR	2620	½	1	0	1	2½/4	Reshevsky	United States	2590	½	0	1		1½/3
6	Smyslov	Russian SFSR	2620	½	1	0	1	2½/4	Ólafsson	Iceland	2560				0	0/1
7	Taimanov	Ukrainian SSR	2600	1	1	½	0	2½/4	Uhlmann	East Germany	2570	0	0	½	1	1½/4
8	Botvinnik	Russian SFSR	2640	1	½	½	½	2½/4	Matulović	Yugoslavia	2560	0	½	½	½	1½/4
9	Tal	Latvian SSR	2590	½	0	1	½	2/4	Najdorf	Argentina	2570	½	1	0	½	2/4
10	Keres	Estonian SSR	2600	½	1	½	1	3/4	Ivkov	Yugoslavia	2570	½	0	½	0	1/4
Totals				5½	6	4	5	20½	Totals			4½	4	6	5	19½

Final score – USSR 20½ versus 19½ Rest of the World

== Second match, London 1984 ==
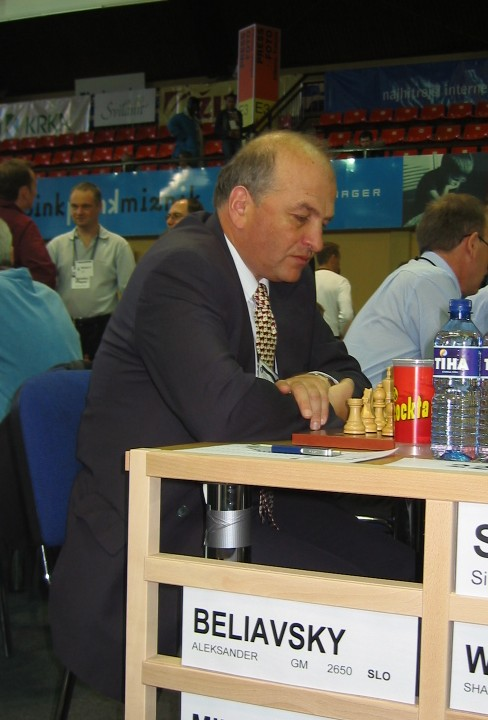
Alexander Beliavsky (USSR) was the top player in 1984, with 3 wins and 1 draw.

The second match occurred in London, June 24–29, 1984 and carried the same "Match of the Century" billing as the first encounter.

Played at the Isle of Dogs, the match only took place thanks to a last minute rescue package, when sponsors withdrew from the previously vaunted venues of Belgrade and then Rome. The London bid was made possible thanks to the efforts of Raymond Keene, the London Docklands Corporation, the British Chess Federation and a wealthy co-sponsor, Indonesian businessman Mr H M Hasan, who wished to be named as captain of the Rest of the World side.

The format followed that of the previous 1970 Match. This time the teams looked closer to equal strength, with average Elo grades being almost identical. Korchnoi had by now swapped sides, following his defection to the west and this was just one conceivable reason why Moscow (the logical 'home and away' choice for a re-match) was not put forward as a venue (there was a great deal of antagonism between Korchnoi and the Soviet authorities). Mr Hasan wisely handed over executive captaincy duties to Lubomir Kavalek whilst the Soviets employed grandmaster and psychologist Nikolai Krogius in the same role. The chief arbiter was Robert Wade.

For the World side, Portisch had been insulted by the offer of board 7 and refused to play. Spassky had only just left the USSR to move to France and felt it would be overly painful to line up as an opponent of his old friends. Hort simply had other commitments. Bent Larsen and Korchnoi were the other veterans present on the world side.

Meanwhile, USSR newcomers Karpov and Kasparov strengthened the top half of the USSR side, an area of weakness in the previous match. The veterans Tal, Smyslov and Polugaevsky participated once more and again turned in respectable performances. Petrosian was absent through illness but the solid Yuri Razuvaev deputised admirably. The World's Miles and Torre restored some pride on the bottom boards, but the real damage was done on board 6, where rampant former world junior champion Beliavsky could not be contained by the combined efforts of Seirawan and Larsen. Some observers believed that Seirawan had foolishly been preferred to the higher rated Walter Browne because he had a more 'glamorous image'.

=== Individual results, board by board ===
USSR vs. Rest of the World, 1984
Bd	USSR Player	Republic	Elo	rd1	rd2	rd3	rd4	Score	Bd	World Player	Country	Elo	rd1	rd2	rd3	rd4	Score
1	Anatoly Karpov	Russian SFSR	2700	1	½	½	½	2½/4	1	Ulf Andersson	Sweden	2630	0	½	½	½	1½/4
2	Garry Kasparov	Azerbaijan SSR	2710	½	½	½	1	2½/4	2	Jan Timman	Netherlands	2610	½	½	½	0	1½/4
3	Lev Polugaevsky	Byelorussian SSR	2615	½	0	½		1/3	3	Viktor Korchnoi	Switzerland	2635	½	1	½	½	2½/4
3	Vladimir Tukmakov	Ukrainian SSR	2550				½	½/1	3	Viktor Korchnoi	Switzerland	2635	½	1	½	½	2½/4
4	Vasily Smyslov	Russian SFSR	2600	0			½	½/2	4	Ljubomir Ljubojević	Yugoslavia	2635	1	0	½	½	2/4
4	Vladimir Tukmakov	Ukrainian SSR	2550		1	½		1½/2	4	Ljubomir Ljubojević	Yugoslavia	2635	1	0	½	½	2/4
5	Rafael Vaganian	Armenian SSR	2630	½	½	½	0	1½/4	5	Zoltán Ribli	Hungary	2610	½	½	½	1	2½/4
6	Alexander Beliavsky	Ukrainian SSR	2565	1	1	½	1	3½/4	6	Yasser Seirawan	United States	2525	0	0			0/2
6	Alexander Beliavsky	Ukrainian SSR	2565	1	1	½	1	3½/4	6	Bent Larsen	Denmark	2565			½	0	½/2
7	Mikhail Tal	Latvian SSR	2620	½		1	½	2/3	7	John Nunn	England	2600	½	½	0		1/3
7	Oleg Romanishin	Ukrainian SSR	2580		½			½/1	7	Murray Chandler	England	2515				½	½/1
8	Yuri Razuvayev	Russian SFSR	2500	½	½	½	½	2/4	8	Robert Hübner	West Germany	2620	½	½	½	½	2/4
9	Artur Yusupov	Russian SFSR	2570	½	½	½		1½/3	9	Tony Miles	England	2615	½	½	½	1	2½/4
9	Oleg Romanishin	Ukrainian SSR	2580				0	0/1	9	Tony Miles	England	2615	½	½	½	1	2½/4
10	Andrei Sokolov	Russian SFSR	2495	0	1		0	1/3	10	Murray Chandler	England	2515			½		½/1
10	Oleg Romanishin	Ukrainian SSR	2580			½		½/1	10	Eugenio Torre	Philippines	2565	1	0		1	2/3
Totals				5	6	5½	4½	21	Totals				5	4	4½	5½	19

Final score – USSR 21, Rest of the World 19

== Third match, Moscow 2002 ==
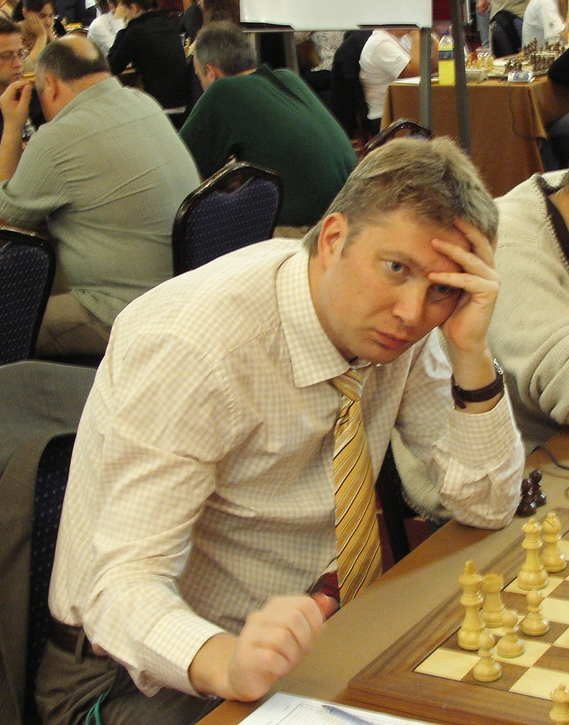
Alexei Shirov (Spain / Rest of the World) achieved the best record in the 2002 match, with 5 wins, 4 draws and 1 loss.

The third match occurred in Moscow, September 8–11, 2002 and was this time billed as the "Match of the New Century" or "Match of the 21st Century".

If the event were to be more media and sponsor-friendly, some drastic format changes were required. Out of favour was the idea that combatants paired up only with their opposite number and engaged in a lengthy, psychological war of attrition. This might have appealed to the chess purist but did nothing for the casual observer or thrills-and-spills-hungry journalist. Furthermore, in order to make chess a viable spectator sport, it was widely believed short time limits and spectacular, rapid finishes were necessary elements. Then there was the difficult task of getting most of the planet's elite players in the same place at the same time. A lengthy tournament might discourage some from attending at all.

The finalised arrangements appeared to successfully cover all of the bases. A ten player, 10-round Scheveningen system format, with a 25-minute (+10 second increment) time limit. This could be compressed into just four days with two or three rounds played each day.

In terms of team selection, the intervening break up of the Soviet Union had precipitated some significant changes. This time it was Russia versus the Rest of the World and players from the remainder of the Union fulfilled the eligibility criteria for the Rest of the World squad. It seemed at first that this would facilitate an unstoppable World team, but on closer inspection, it was not so clear. Russian world champions (and 1984 USSR team survivors) Garry Kasparov and Anatoly Karpov were to be joined by two more exclusive "K" club members—world champions Vladimir Kramnik and Alexander Khalifman. With the further addition of three former champions of Russia (Alexander Morozevich, Peter Svidler and Alexander Motylev) and two more players with Elo ratings in excess of 2700 (Evgeny Bareev and Alexander Grischuk), things were looking decidedly brighter than might have been expected. Indeed, the average Elo ratings of the two sides were separated by only one point and so a close contest was in prospect.

The World team had most of their first choice players available, except for absentees Michael Adams and Veselin Topalov who would have been automatic picks. The inclusion of ex-Soviets, Ilya Smirin, Vasily Ivanchuk, Boris Gelfand, Alexei Shirov and Ruslan Ponomariov however, appeared to compensate well for any losses.

Each side was allowed two substitutes, who could fill in anywhere, provided they did not play anyone more than once. These were Sergei Rublevsky and Vadim Zvjaginsev for the Russians and Vladimir Akopian and Zurab Azmaiparashvili for the Rest of the World (World).

The outcome was finely balanced for most of the match, the Rest of the World side just pulling away for a comfortable win in the last three rounds.

In seeking to identify poor performances on the Russian side, it is noticeable that by the end of round 3, none of the four "K"s had scored a single win. Kasparov in particular, looked out of sorts, losing to Judit Polgár for the first time in some 20 encounters. Motylev and Zvjaginsev looked out of their depth.

There were however some sterling performances from the Rest of the World team, none more so than Shirov who scored 7/10, for a performance rating of 2865. Radjabov too, the youngest and lowest rated of the contest, produced some sparkling chess and contributed a solid 5/10. Here is his comprehensive rout of Karpov's Queen's Indian Defence:

Radjabov vs. Karpov, Russia vs Rest of the World (round 2), 2002, ECO E12, 1–0
1. d4 Nf6 2. c4 e6 3. Nf3 b6 4. a3 Bb7 5. Nc3 d5 6. cxd5 Nxd5 7. e3 g6 8. Bb5+ c6 9. Ba4 Bg7 10. 0-0 0-0 11. e4 Nxc3 12. bxc3 c5 13. Bg5 Qd6 14. Re1 Nc6 15. e5 Qc7 16. Qd2 Na5 17. Rac1 Bd5 18. Qf4 Rfc8 19. h4 Qb7 20. Bf6 Bf8 21. Nh2 cxd4 22. cxd4 Rxc1 23. Rxc1 Bxg2 24. Ng4 h5 25. Ne3 Be4 26. Bd1 b5 27. d5 Bxd5 28. Nxd5 exd5 29. e6 Nc4 30. Qg5 Kh7 31. Bc2 Bg7 32. Re1 Re8 33. Qxh5+ Kg8 34. Bxg6 Kf8 35. e7+ 1–0

Teams in full:

- Russia – (alphabetically) – Evgeny Bareev; Alexei Dreev; Alexander Grischuk; Anatoly Karpov; Garry Kasparov; Alexander Khalifman; Vladimir Kramnik; Alexander Morozevich; Alexander Motylev; Sergei Rublevsky; Peter Svidler; Vadim Zvjaginsev.
- World – (alphabetically) – Vladimir Akopian; Viswanathan Anand; Zurab Azmaiparashvili; Boris Gelfand; Vassily Ivanchuk; Peter Leko; Judit Polgár; Ruslan Ponomariov; Teimour Radjabov; Alexei Shirov; Nigel Short; Ilya Smirin.

=== Round-by-round match scores ===
Round	Date	Russia	World	World net score
1	Sept 8	4	6	+2
2	Sept 8	4½	5½	+3
3	Sept 9	5½	4½	+2
4	Sept 9	5½	4½	+1
5	Sept 9	5	5	+1
6	Sept 10	5	5	+1
7	Sept 10	5	5	+1
8	Sept 10	4	6	+3
9	Sept 11	4½	5½	+4
10	Sept 11	5	5	+4
Total		48	52	+4

Final match score: Russia: 48 versus World: 52

=== Crosstable of individual scores ===
- R = Russian win, W = World win, d = draw

World	Russia												
World	Bareev	Dreev	Grischuk	Karpov	Kasparov	Khalifman	Kramnik	Morozevich	Motylev	Rublevsky	Svidler	Zvjaginsev	Total
Akopian (ARM)	-	-	-	-	W	-	R	R	-	-	-	-	1/3
Anand (IND)	d	-	-	d	d	d	d	d	W	-	R	W	5/9
Azma'vili (GEO)	d	-	d	-	-	d	-	-	-	-	-	-	1½/3
Gelfand (ISR)	R	W	d	d	d	W	d	d	W	-	d	-	6/10
Ivanchuk (UKR)	d	d	d	d	W	-	d	d	d	W	d	-	6/10
Leko (HUN)	d	d	d	R	d	d	d	W	W	-	d	-	5½/10
Polgár (HUN)	-	R	R	R	W	-	d	-	-	R	-	d	2/7
P'mariov (UKR)	d	-	d	-	d	W	d	d	d	d	d	W	6/10
Radjabov (AZE)	W	d	R	W	d	d	-	R	-	d	R	W	5/10
Shirov (ESP)	d	d	W	d	R	d	W	W	W	-	W	-	7/10
Short (ENG)	R	d	d	R	d	d	-	R	-	d	d	-	3/9
Smirin (ISR)	R	R	d	W	-	d	W	R	-	d	d	-	4/9
Total	6/10	4½/8	5½/10	5/9	4/10	3½/9	4/9	6/10	1/6	3/6	5/9	½/4	

== Summary ==
Date	Venue	Winner	Score
March 29 – April 5, 1970	(Socialist Federal Republic of Yugoslavia) Belgrade, Yugoslavia	Soviet Union	20½–19½
June 24–29, 1984	London, United Kingdom	Soviet Union	21–19
September 8–11, 2002	Moscow, Russia	(United Nations) Rest of the World	52–48
