= 1949 SFR Yugoslavia Chess Championship =

5th SFR Yugoslavia Chess Championship
- Location: Zagreb

Champion
- Svetozar Gligorić

The 1949 SFR Yugoslavia Chess Championship was the 5th edition of SFR Yugoslav Chess Championship. Held in Zagreb, SFR Yugoslavia, SR Croatia. The tournament was won by Svetozar Gligorić.

== Table and results ==
5th SFR Yugoslavia Chess Championship
N°	Player (age)	Wins	Draws	Losses	Total points
1	(Socialist Federal Republic of Yugoslavia) IM Svetozar Gligorić (26)	9	10	0	14
2	(Socialist Federal Republic of Yugoslavia) GM Vasja Pirc (42)	7	11	1	12.5
3	(Socialist Federal Republic of Yugoslavia) IM Petar Trifunović (39)	6	11	2	11.5
4	(Socialist Federal Republic of Yugoslavia) CM Borislav Ivkov (16)	6	10	3	11
5	(Socialist Federal Republic of Yugoslavia) NM Braslav Rabar (30)	5	12	2	11
6	(Socialist Federal Republic of Yugoslavia) NM Aleksandar Matanović (19)	8	6	5	11
7	(Socialist Federal Republic of Yugoslavia) NM Andrija Fuderer (18)	8	6	5	11
8	(Socialist Federal Republic of Yugoslavia) NM Stojan Puc (28)	5	11	3	10.5
9	(Socialist Federal Republic of Yugoslavia) GM Borislav Kostić (62)	4	11	4	9.5
10	(Socialist Federal Republic of Yugoslavia) NM Sava Vuković (37)	6	7	6	9.5
11	(Socialist Federal Republic of Yugoslavia) NM Borislav Milić (24)	4	11	4	9.5
12	(Socialist Federal Republic of Yugoslavia) CM Milan Germek (28)	3	12	4	9
13	(Socialist Federal Republic of Yugoslavia) NM Bora Tot (42)	6	5	8	8.5
14	(Socialist Federal Republic of Yugoslavia) NM Srećko Nedeljković (26)	3	10	6	8
15	(Socialist Federal Republic of Yugoslavia) NM Dragoljub Janošević (26)	6	4	9	8
16	(Socialist Federal Republic of Yugoslavia) NM Aleksandar Božić (27)	2	12	5	8
17	(Socialist Federal Republic of Yugoslavia) CM Nikola Karaklajić (23)	6	4	9	8
18	(Socialist Federal Republic of Yugoslavia) NM Borko Simonović (30)	1	12	6	7
19	(Socialist Federal Republic of Yugoslavia) NM Vasilije Tomović (43)	3	7	9	6.5
20	(Socialist Federal Republic of Yugoslavia) NM Đorđe Avirović (39)	3	6	10	6
