= Soviet Union–Yugoslavia chess matches =

From 1956 to 1979, the Soviet Union and Yugoslavia contested friendly team chess matches on an almost annual basis, with the venue alternating between the two countries. It was regarded as a highlight of the Eastern European chess calendar. Only men participated in the first three matches, but afterwards women and boys were often included on the teams as well.

At the time the Soviet Union was a powerhouse of team chess: they won every edition of the international Chess Olympiad from 1956 to 1974, and every European Team Chess Championship from 1957 to 1977. Yugoslavia had a respectable record in team competition: at the Olympiad, they finished second six times and third three times from 1956 to 1974, and they also achieved four second-place finishes at the European Team Championship from 1957 to 1977. Nevertheless, the rivalry between the two countries turned out to be one-sided: all 21 of the matches were won by the Soviet team.

== Summary and statistics ==
The results of the 21 matches are summarized below. The matches were held as either regular team matches, or using the Scheveningen system. Results are listed with the USSR's score first, followed by Yugoslavia's.

USSR vs. Yugoslavia chess matches, 1956–1979
Year	Dates	Location	Team composition	Format	Men's score	Women's score	Boys' score	Total score
1956	17–28 June	Belgrade	8 men	Scheveningen	38–26	–	–	38–26
1957	3–15 July	Leningrad	8 men	Scheveningen	42–22	–	–	42–22
1958	22–27 June	Zagreb	8 men	match	19½–12½	–	–	42–22
1959	1–10 July	Kyiv	8 men, 2 women	match	20½–11½	4–4	–	24½–15½
1961	10–20 May	Belgrade	7 men, 3 women, 3 boys	Scheveningen	20½–15½	6–6	5–7	31½–28½
1962	24 June – 4 July	Lviv	6 men, 2 women, 2 boys	Scheveningen	22½–13½	7½–4½	7–5	37–23
1963	1–10 June	Rijeka	6 men, 2 women, 2 boys	Scheveningen	21½–14½	6–6	8–4	35½–24½
1964	10–15 June	Leningrad	6 men, 2 women, 2 boys	Scheveningen	25–11	7½–4½	6–6	38½–21½
1965	5–15 July	Vrnjačka Banja	6 men, 2 women, 2 boys	Scheveningen	23½–12½	8–4	6½–5½	38–22
1966	10–15 June	Sukhumi	6 men, 2 women, 2 boys	Scheveningen	21½–14½	9–3	7–5	37½–22½
1967	21 June – 5 July	Budva	6 men, 3 women, 3 boys	Scheveningen	19–17	11–7	13½–4½	43½–28½
1968	21 June – 2 July	Sochi	7 men, 3 women, 2 boys	match	17–11	7½–4½	6–2	30½–17½
1969	29 June – 6 July	Skopje	10 men	match	22–18	–	–	22–18
1971	9–16 November	Yerevan	6 men, 3 boys	Scheveningen	23½–12½	–	11½–6½	35–19
1972	25 June – 1 July	Ohrid	6 men, 2 women, 2 boys	match	13½–10½	6–2	7–1	26½–13½
1973	28 Nov – 4 Dec	Tbilisi	6 men, 3 women, 3 boys	match	14–10	8½–1½	6½–3½	31–15
1974	3–12 November	Belgrade	6 men	Scheveningen	19½–16½	–	–	19½–16½
1975	3–12 November	Odesa	7 men	Scheveningen	20–16	–	–	20–16
1976	27 May – 2 June	Krk	6 men, 2 women, 2 boys	match	15½–8½	7½–½	6–2	29–11
1977	11–20 November	Tallinn	6 men, 2 women, 2 boys	match	19–5	7½–½	4½–3½	31–9
1979	29 May – 8 June	Teslić	6 men, 2 women, 2 boys	match	13–11	8–0	4–4	25–15
Cumulative totals (USSR–Yugoslavia), 1956–1979					440½–289½	104–48	110½–59½	655–397

The following players participated in seven or more matches:

- 16: Borislav Ivkov
- 14: Svetozar Gligorić, Aleksandar Matanović
- 11: Efim Geller, Milan Matulović
- 9: Bruno Parma, Mark Taimanov
- 8: Dragoljub Minić, Tigran Petrosian
- 7: Rafael Vaganian, Leonid Stein

Seven players, all from the Soviet side, achieved perfect scores in a single event. Vladimir Tukmakov scored 5/5 in 1965, and the following players scored 4/4: Maia Chiburdanidze in 1973, Anna Akhsharumova in 1976, Gennadi Zaichik and Tatjana Fomina in 1977, and Nana Alexandria and Elena Akhmilovskaya in 1979.

== Reunion in 2007 ==
The Soviet Union and Yugoslavia stopped contesting regular matches after 1979. However, their friendly rivalry was rekindled in 2007, long after both countries had ceased to exist. Players who had competed in the former matches reunited to play a two-game match on ten boards on 8 and 9 November 2007 in Moscow. Each team consisted of eight men and two women. This was Svetozar Gligorić's last published event. His opponent on board 1 was Viktor Korchnoi, who famously defected from the Soviet Union in 1976, but nevertheless happily participated on the "Soviet" side.

Again the "Soviet" team won, this time by a score of 11 to 9. The results are given in the table below. Game scores are given from the Soviet players' point of view: "1" for a Soviet win, "0" for a Yugoslav win, and "½" for a drawn game.

"22nd" USSR vs. Yugoslavia match, 8–9 November 2007, Moscow
Board	"USSR"	Game 1	Game 2	"Yugoslavia"	Result
1	Viktor Korchnoi	1	½	Svetozar Gligorić	1½–½
2	Evgeni Vasiukov	½	½	Borislav Ivkov	1–1
3	Mark Taimanov	½	½	Aleksandar Matanović	1–1
4	Yuri Balashov	0	½	Dragoljub Velimirović	½–1½
5	Igor Zaitsev	½	½	Nikola Karaklajić	1–1
6	Yuri Averbakh	½	0	Svetozar Vlahović	½–1½
7	Vladislav Vorotnikov	½	1	Zoran Spasojević	1½–½
8	Anatoly Machulsky	½	½	Andreja Savić	1–1
9	Elena Fatalibekova	1	½	Milunka Lazarević	1½–½
10	Ludmila Zaitseva	1	½	Katarina Blagojević	1½–½
Final result (USSR–Yugoslavia)					11–9
