= Bruno Parma =

Slovene chess grandmaster (1941–2026)

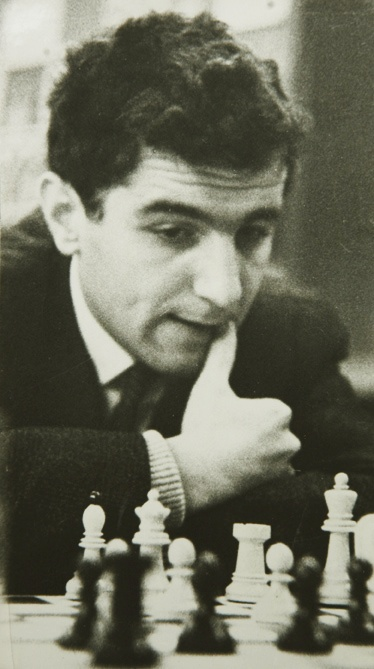

Personal information
- Born: 30 December 1941 Lubiana, Italy (nowadays Ljubljana, Slovenia)
- Died: 6 February 2026 (aged 84)

Chess career
- Country: Yugoslavia → Slovenia
- Title: Grandmaster (1963)
- Peak rating: 2540 (January 1978)
- Peak ranking: No. 46 (January 1978)

Bruno Parma (30 December 1941 – 6 February 2026) was a Slovene-Yugoslav chess player and Grandmaster.

== Biography ==
Parma was born in Italian-occupied Ljubljana. He first played in the World Junior Chess Championship in 1959, sharing second place. Two years later at age 21 he won the next Junior Championship (The Hague 1961), receiving the title of International Master. FIDE granted him the grandmaster title based on his outstanding performance at the Beverwijk tournament in 1963. He was the third Slovene to become a grandmaster, after Milan Vidmar (1950) and Vasja Pirc (1953). He won the Slovenian Chess Championship in 1959 and 1961 and shared third place with Dragoljub Minić, Milan Matulović, and Bojan Kurajica in the 1968 Yugoslav Championship in Čateške Toplice.

In an international tournament at San Juan, Puerto Rico in 1969 he was second together with two grandmasters, Arthur Bisguier and Walter Browne, behind Boris Spassky. His best results were shared first with Georgi Tringov in Vršac 1973 ahead of Wolfgang Uhlmann.

He played for the Yugoslav team in the Chess Olympiads eight times: 1962, 1964, 1966, 1968, 1970, 1974, 1978, and 1980. The Yugoslav team won four silver medals and two bronze medals in those years. He also represented Yugoslavia nine times in the USSR versus Yugoslavia matches held in the 1960s and 1970s.

Parma died on 6 February 2026, at the age of 84.
