= Milan Matulović =

Yugoslav chess grandmaster (1935–2013)

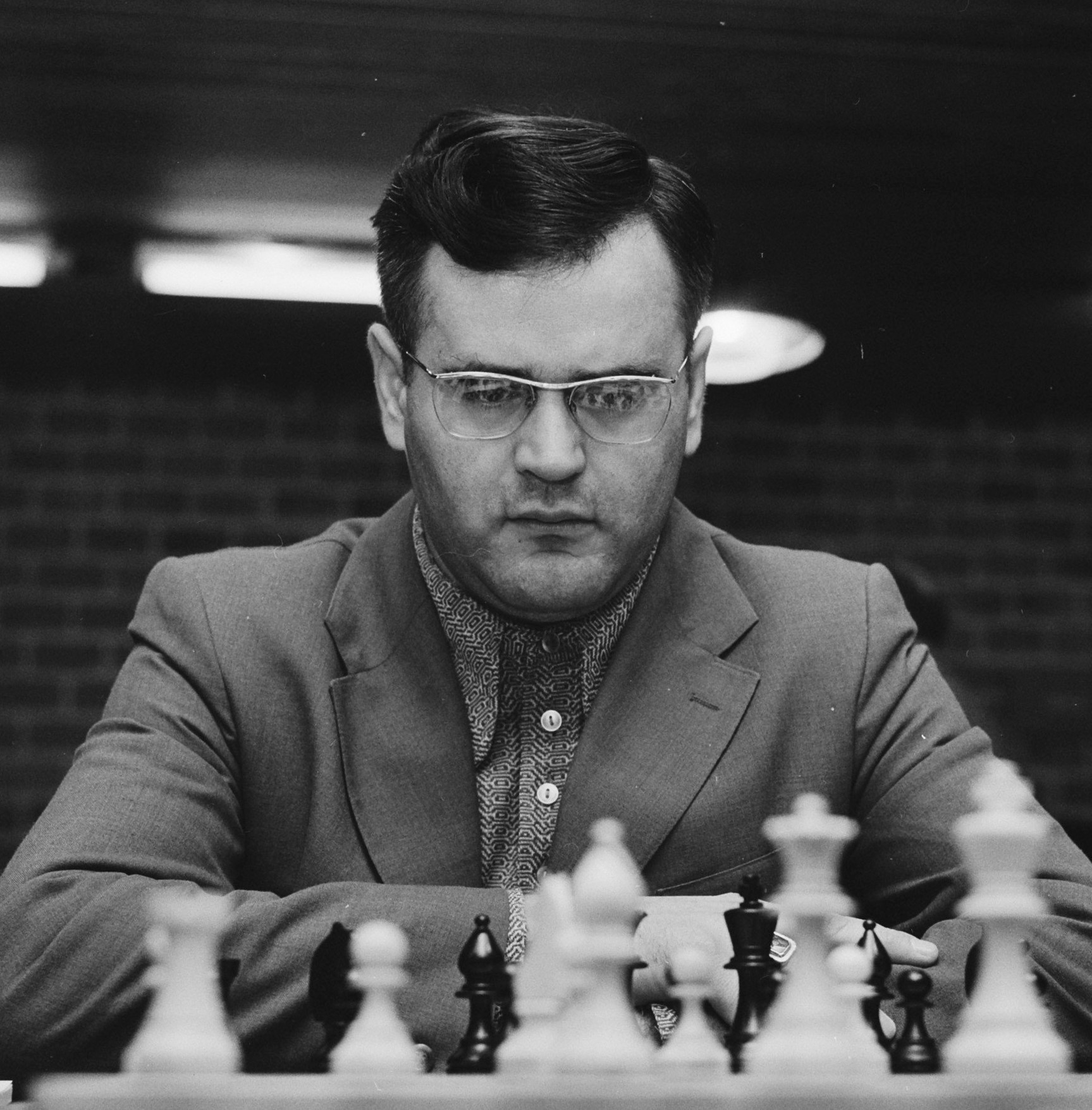
- Matulović (Hoogovens, 1974)

Personal information
- Born: 10 June 1935 Belgrade
- Died: 9 October 2013 (aged 78)

Chess career
- Country: Yugoslavia
- Title: Grandmaster (1965)
- Peak rating: 2530 (May 1974)
- Peak ranking: No. 47 (July 1971)

Milan Matulović (Serbian Cyrillic: Милан Матуловић; 10 June 1935 – 9 October 2013) was a Serbian-Yugoslav chess grandmaster who was the third strongest Yugoslav player for much of the 1960s and 1970s behind Svetozar Gligorić and Borislav Ivkov. He was primarily active before 1977, but remained an occasional tournament competitor until 2006.

== Career ==
Milan Matulović
Medal record

Representing Yugoslavia

Men's chess

Olympiad
Silver medal – second place	1964 Tel Aviv	Open team
Gold medal – first place	1964 Tel Aviv	Individual board 2nd reserve
Silver medal – second place	1966 Havana	Individual board 1st reserve
Silver medal – second place	1968 Lugano	Open team
Bronze medal – third place	1970 Siegen	Open team
Silver medal – second place	1970 Siegen	Individual board 3
Bronze medal – third place	1972 Skopje	Open team

European Championship
Silver medal – second place	1961 Oberhausen	Open team
Silver medal – second place	1965 Hamburg	Open team
Silver medal – second place	1973 Bath	Open team

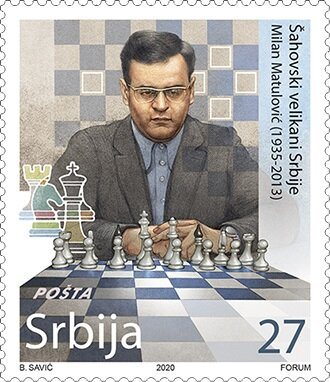
Matulović on a 2020 stamp of Serbia

Matulović was born in Belgrade. In 1958 he played a four-game training match with Bobby Fischer, of which he won one, drew one and lost two. He achieved the International Master title in 1961 and became a Grandmaster in 1965.

He won the Yugoslav Chess Championships of 1965 and 1967 and was a prolific competitor on the international tournament scene during the 1960s and 1970s. At the super tournament in Skopje in 1967, he shared second place with Geller, only half a point behind Fischer. One year later in Vinkovci, he won the second place again behind the brilliant American. Probably his best result was equal first with Gligorić, Ivkov and Lev Polugaevsky at Belgrade 1969 ahead of former World Chess Champion Mikhail Botvinnik and multiple candidate Efim Geller. Other first-place finishes during this period, either shared or outright, included Netanya 1961, Vršac 1964, Novi Sad 1965, Belgrade 1965, Reggio Emilia 1967/68, Athens Zonal 1969, Sarajevo 1971, Birmingham 1975, Bajmok 1975 (and in 1978), Majdanpek 1976, Vrbas 1976, Belgrade 1977 and Odzaci 1978. From the 1980s his tournament victories became less frequent, but included Osijek 1980, Borovo 1980, Helsinki 1981 and Vrnjacka Banja 1985. He repeated his Vrnjacka Banja success in 1990.

Matulović had excellent results in the Chess Olympiads. He played 78 games in five events for Yugoslavia, with the overall result of 46 wins, 28 draws and four losses, for a 76.9 percent score, the 10th all-time best Olympic performance. During his career, Matulović won 7 team and board medals at Chess Olympiad, which makes him the fifth-most decorated Serbian and Yugoslav player of all time behind Petar Trifunović (8), Aleksandar Matanović (13), Svetozar Gligorić (13) and Borislav Ivkov (14). He also represented Yugoslavia 11 times in the USSR versus Yugoslavia matches held from the 1950s to the 1970s.

His pursuit of the world championship was less successful, as he never advanced to the Candidates stage of the process for selecting a challenger for the title. He played in the 1970 "USSR versus Rest of the World" match on eighth board against Botvinnik, losing one game and drawing the other three. A controversy attended this pairing, as Matulović had a history of poor results against the Soviet player; there were accusations that the Soviet team captain had placed Botvinnik on a lower board than his stature would warrant in order to take advantage of this.

On September 23, 2020, the public company "Pošta Srbije" released a new postage stamps called: "Chess Giants of Serbia". In addition to Matulović, Svetozar Gligorić, Boris Kostić, Petar Trifunović and Milunka Lazarević were also given this honor. On that occasion, short biographies of the players depicted on these stamps were also published. The texts are given in Serbian and English, and their authors are: Matulović's teammate from the national team and close friend, grandmaster Aleksandar Matanović and sports journalist Miroslav Nešić.

== Controversies ==
Matulović was involved with controversial incidents. Over the board he played on in hopeless positions when grandmaster etiquette called for a resignation, allegedly in the hopes of reaching adjournment (suspension of a game for resumption on a later day, common in tournament play at the time) so that the news reports would read "Matulović's game is adjourned" rather than "Matulović lost."

More seriously, after the 1970 Interzonal tournament at Palma de Mallorca, he was accused of "throwing" his game against Mark Taimanov in return for a $400 bribe, thus allowing Taimanov to advance to the Candidates matches, where Taimanov was defeated by Bobby Fischer 6–0. The accusations centered on Matulović's conduct during the game and the alleged feebleness of his resistance. It has also been suggested that he was simply uninterested in the game, however, having been eliminated from contention for the Candidates matches. The score of this game follows:

Taimanov vs. Matulović; Queen's Gambit Accepted
1.d4 d5 2.c4 dxc4 3.Nf3 Nf6 4.e3 Bg4 5.Bxc4 e6 6.Nc3 Nbd7 7.h3 Bh5 8.0-0 Bd6 9.e4 e5 10.dxe5 Nxe5 11.Be2 Bxf3 12.Bxf3 Nxf3+ 13.Qxf3 Qe7 14.Bf4 Be5 15.Bxe5 Qxe5 16.Qe3 0-0 17.f4 Qe7 18.e5 c6 19.Rfe1 Rfe8 20.Qf3 Qc5+ 21.Qf2 Qxf2+ 22.Kxf2 Nd5 23.Nxd5 cxd5 24.Red1 Red8 25.Rac1 Rd7 26.Ke3 Rad8 27.Kd4 Kf8 28.f5 Ke7 29.Rd3 Re8 30.Rdc3 b6 31.Rc7 Rd8 32.R1c6 Ke8 33.g4 h6 34.h4 Rb8 35.g5 hxg5 36.hxg5 Rb7 37.Rc8+ Rd8 38.Rxd8+ Kxd8 39.Kxd5 a5 40.Rd6+ Ke8 41.Kc6 Re7 42.Rd5 1–0

Perhaps Matulović's most notorious transgression was against István Bilek at the Sousse Interzonal in 1967. He played a losing move but then took it back after saying "j'adoube" ("I adjust" – spoken before adjusting pieces on their square, see touch-move rule). His opponent complained to the arbiter but the move was allowed to stand. This incident earned Matulović the nickname "J'adoubovic". This reportedly happened several times, including in a game against Bobby Fischer.

Matulović was convicted of vehicular manslaughter and served nine months in prison for a car accident in which a woman was killed.

== Playing style ==
Matulović vs. Tringov, Siegen 1970

Position: b8 black rook, c8 black bishop, e8 black rook, h8 black king, d7 black knight, e7 black queen, g7 black bishop, c6 black pawn, f6 black pawn, g6 black pawn, a5 black pawn, e5 black pawn, h5 black pawn, a4 white pawn, c4 white bishop, e4 white pawn, b3 white pawn, d3 white rook, e3 white bishop, g3 white knight, c2 white pawn, f2 white queen, g2 white pawn, h2 white pawn, d1 white rook, h1 white king

Position after 24...Rb8

Matulović's sharp attacking play was demonstrated in this game against the Bulgarian grandmaster Georgi Tringov from the 1970 Chess Olympiad at Siegen.

Matulović vs. Tringov; Pirc Defense
1.e4 d6 2.d4 Nf6 3.Nc3 g6 4.f4 Bg7 5.Nf3 0-0 6.Bd3 Nbd7 7.0-0 e5 8.fxe5 dxe5 9.d5 c6 10.dxc6 bxc6 11.Kh1 Qc7 12.Be3 Nb6 13.a4 a5 14.Qe1 Nfd7 15.Rd1 Qd8 16.Qf2 Rb8 17.Nd2 Qe7 18.b3 Kh8 19.Ne2 f6 20.Ng3 h5 21.Nc4 Nxc4 22.Bxc4 Rb4 23.Rd3 Re8 24.Rfd1 Rb8 (diagram) 25.Nf5 gxf5 26.Qh4 Nf8 27.Qxh5+ Nh7 28.Bc5 Qxc5 29.Rh3 Bh6 30.Qxe8+ Qf8 31.Rd8 fxe4 32.Qxf8+ Bxf8 33.Rxf8+ Kg7 34.Rg8# 1–0

== See also ==
- Cheating in chess

== Bibliography ==
- Fox, Mike; James, Richard (1993), The Even More Complete Chess Addict, Faber and Faber, ISBN 0-571-17040-4
- Golombek, Harry (1977), Golombek's Encyclopedia of Chess, Crown Publishers, ISBN 0-517-53146-1
- Levy, David (1972), The Chess of Gligoric, World Publishing, ISBN 0-529-04889-2
- Levy, David (July 1975), "World Record for Statham Tournament", Chess Life & Review, vol. 30, no. 7, p. 415
- Radojcic, Miro (September 1970), "Observation Point: Crazy, Man, Crazy", Chess Life, 25 (9): 500–501.
