= Borislav Ivkov =

Serbian chess grandmaster (1933–2022)

Bora Ivkov
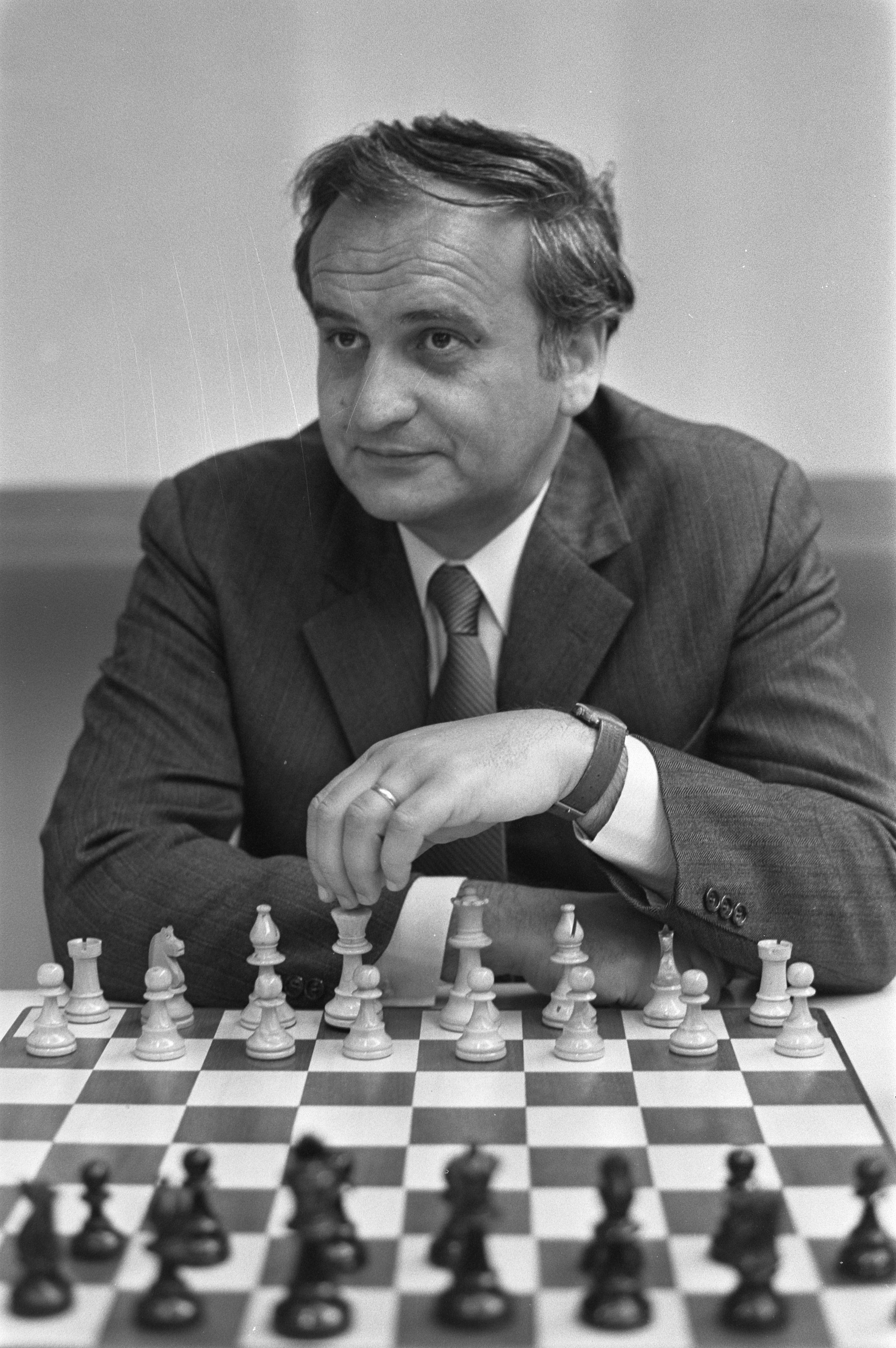
- Ivkov in 1972

Personal information
- Born: 12 November 1933 Belgrade, Yugoslavia (now Serbia)
- Died: 14 February 2022 (aged 88)

Chess career
- Country: Yugoslavia → Serbia
- Title: Grandmaster (1955)
- Peak rating: 2560 (January 1971)
- Peak ranking: No. 28 (July 1971)

Borislav Ivkov (Serbian Cyrillic: Борислав Ивков; 12 November 1933 – 14 February 2022) was a Yugoslav and Serbian chess Grandmaster, three-time Yugoslav Champion (1958, 1964, 1972), the first World Junior Champion (1951), and one of the most decorated players in the history of Chess Olympiad. He was a World championship candidate in 1965 and played in four more Interzonal tournaments in 1967, 1970, 1973 and 1979.

He represented Yugoslavia 12 times in Olympiad competition, from 1956 to 1980, and six times in European Team Championships.

Ivkov won numerous top-class events during his career; notable tournament triumphs include Mar del Plata 1955, Buenos Aires 1955, Beverwijk 1961, Zagreb 1965, Sarajevo 1967, Amsterdam-IBM 1974, and Moscow 1999. For more than 15 years from the mid-1950s, he was the second-ranking Yugoslav player, after Svetozar Gligorić. He wrote an autobiography, My 60 Years in Chess.

== National Master, World Junior Champion ==
Ivkov earned his National Master title in 1949 at age 16, by placing shared 4th–7th in the Yugoslav Championship at Zagreb, with 11/19; the winner was Svetozar Gligorić. Ivkov earned his first international event opportunity at Bled 1950, sharing 5th–6th places with 7½/14; the winner was Miguel Najdorf. In this tournament, which featured some of the world's best players, Ivkov defeated well-known stars such as Hermann Pilnik, Milan Vidmar Jr., and Vasja Pirc. After this impressive debut, he was selected to represent Yugoslavia in team matches against the United States and the Netherlands in 1950 and against West Germany in 1951.

Ivkov won the inaugural World Junior Chess Championship in 1951 at Birmingham; this tournament was established for players under age 20. He continued his progress with two solid showings in Yugoslav Championships: at Sarajevo 1951 he tied 10th–12th places with 9½/19 (winner Braslav Rabar), and at Belgrade 1952 he tied 7th–9th places with 10/19 (winner Petar Trifunović). At Opatija 1953, Ivkov scored 10/17 for a shared 4th–6th place; the winner was Aleksandar Matanović. Ivkov was still eligible by age in 1953 to try to repeat his World Junior success; at Copenhagen he won his preliminary group with 7/9, but scored only 3½/7 in the finals to place tied 3rd–4th, as Oscar Panno and Klaus Darga tied at the top.

== Rapid rise ==
Ivkov shared 4th–5th place (with Petrosian) at Belgrade 1954 with 11½/19; this was his strongest event to date, the first Yugoslav event to welcome Soviet players following the end of World War II. The winner was David Bronstein. Ivkov earned the International Master title.

Ivkov broke through into the group of the world's elite players with two brilliant results in strong tournaments in Argentina. He won at Mar del Plata 1955 with 11½/15, ahead of Najdorf, Gligoric, Szabo, Luděk Pachman, Panno and Pilnik. Then he won again at Buenos Aires 1955 with 13/17, ahead of Gligoric, Pilnik, László Szabó, Bisguier, Luděk Pachman, Rosseto, Panno and Donner. In the Yugoslav Championship at Novi Sad 1955, Ivkov had his best national result to date with a shared 3rd–4th place on 10½/17; the winner was Karaklajic. Then at Zagreb 1955, he tied 2nd–3rd places with Matanovic on 12½/19; the winner was Vasily Smyslov. Ivkov earned his Grandmaster title in 1955.

At Hastings 1955–56, Ivkov finished 3rd with 6½/9 behind winners Viktor Korchnoi and Friðrik Ólafsson. He represented Yugoslavia in the World Students' Olympiad at Uppsala 1956; on board two he scored 5/9 (+2 =6 −1), and Yugoslavia won the team bronze medals.

== National team stalwart ==
Borislav Ivkov
Medal record

Representing Yugoslavia

Men's chess

Olympiad
Silver medal – second place	1956 Moscow	Open team
Silver medal – second place	1956 Moscow	Individual board 3
Silver medal – second place	1958 Munich	Open team
Bronze medal – third place	1960 Leipzig	Open team
Bronze medal – third place	1960 Leipzig	Individual board 3
Silver medal – second place	1962 Varna	Open team
Gold medal – first place	1962 Varna	Individual board 4
Silver medal – second place	1964 Tel Aviv	Open team
Silver medal – second place	1968 Lugano	Open team
Bronze medal – third place	1970 Siegen	Open team
Gold medal – first place	1970 Siegen	Individual board 2
Bronze medal – third place	1972 Skopje	Open team
Silver medal – second place	1974 Nice	Open team
Bronze medal – third place	1980 Valletta	Open team

European Championship
Silver medal – second place	1957 Vienna	Open team
Silver medal – second place	1965 Hamburg	Open team
Silver medal – second place	1973 Bath	Open team
Gold medal – first place	1973 Bath	Individual board 2
Bronze medal – third place	1977 Moscow	Open team
Silver medal – second place	1977 Moscow	Individual board 6
Silver medal – second place	1980 Skara	Individual board 3

Ivkov earned the first of his 12 selections to the Yugoslav Olympiad team in 1956, and was a member of the national team continuously through 1980 with a personal score of 82 wins, 13 losses and 76 draws (70.2%). This was during the golden age of Serbian chess, a period when Yugoslavia (led by Serbian grandmasters like Gligorić, Ivkov, Trifunović, Matanović, Matulović, Ljubojević etc.) was usually among the top three chess countries. He won a total of ten team medals and four board medals during his career.

- Moscow 1956: board 3, 12/16 (+9−1=6), board silver, team silver;
- Munich 1958: board 3, 9½/15 (+7−3=5), team silver;
- Leipzig 1960: board 3, 12/16 (+9−1=6), board bronze, team bronze;
- Varna 1962: board 4, 13½/16 (+11−0=5), board gold, team silver;
- Tel Aviv 1964: board 2, 11½/16 (+8−1=7), team silver;
- Havana 1966: board 2, 10/15 (+8−3=4);
- Lugano 1968: board 2, 9/14 (+5−1=8), team silver;
- Siegen 1970: board 2, 10/13 (+7−0=6), board gold, team bronze;
- Skopje 1972: board 2, 12/18 (+6−0=12), team bronze;
- Nice 1974: board 3, 12/17 (+8−1=8), board 4th, team silver;
- Buenos Aires 1978: board 4, 3/7 (+1−2=4);
- Valletta 1980: board 2, 5½/8 (+3−0=5), team bronze.

With 14 team and board medals at Chess Olympiad, Ivkov set an all-time record among Serbian and Yugoslav players and become the fifth-most decorated player in the Olympiad history (tied with Garry Kasparov) behind Mikhail Tal (15), Paul Keres (15), Tigran Petrosian (16) and Vasily Smyslov (17). At the same time, his 10 team medals are the second most all-time (tied with Petrosian) behind Svetozar Gligorić's 12.

Ivkov made his first appearance at the European team level in the inaugural event at Vienna 1957, and was chosen on five further occasions. He won four team medals and three board medal in Euroteams events. According to the site olimpbase.org, Ivkov's totals in Euroteams play are (+10 =29 −4), for 57 per cent.

- Vienna 1957: board 3, 3½/6 (+2−1=3), team silver;
- Hamburg 1965: board 1, 5/10 (+2−2=6), team silver;
- Kapfenberg 1970: board 2, 4/7 (+2−1=4); board 4th, team 4th
- Bath 1973: board 2, 4½/7 (+2−0=5), board gold, team silver;
- Moscow 1977: board 6, 4/7 (+1−0=6), board silver, team bronze;
- Skara 1980: board 3, 3½/6 (+1−0=5), board silver.

Ivkov also participated in 16 editions of the USSR versus Yugoslavia matches from 1956 to 1979, more than any other Yugoslav or Soviet player.

== Yugoslav Champion, international victories ==
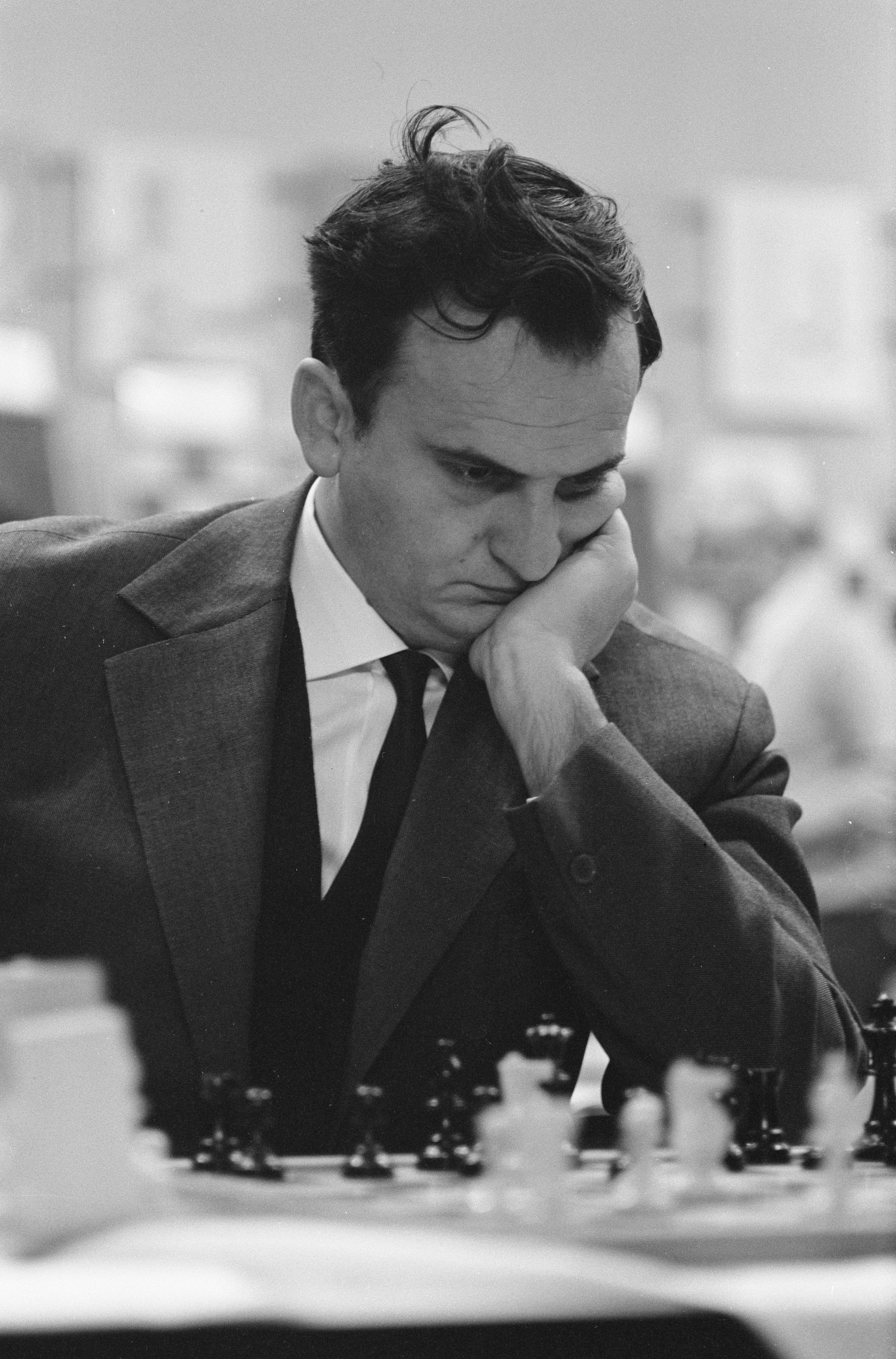
Ivkov in 1963

Ivkov narrowly missed becoming Yugoslav champion at Sombor 1957 when he scored 14/22 to share 2nd–4th places behind Gligoric. But he had a setback at the 1957 Wageningen Zonal tournament, failing to qualify for the Interzonal stage by making only 8½/17 for 9th position. He recovered with his first Yugoslav title at Sarajevo 1958, sharing the title with Gligoric on 12½/19. This victory set off a string of tournament triumphs over the next five years. Ivkov won at Sarajevo 1958 with 7/11. He won at Belgrade 1959 by 2½ points with 9/11. In a strong field at Dresden 1959, he shared 3rd–4th places with 10/15 behind winners Efim Geller and Mark Taimanov. Ivkov shared the win at Lima 1959 with Pachman on 10½/13, and again shared the win at Santiago 1959 with Pachman. At Mar del Plata 1959, he shared 3rd–4th places with Bobby Fischer, behind winners Pachman and Najdorf.

Ivkov shared the victory at Beverwijk 1961 with Bent Larsen on 7½/9. At Belgrade 1962, he was second on 8/11 behind Gligoric. At Havana 1962, Ivkov scored 14½/21, but had to content himself with sixth place, as Najdorf won. Ivkov qualified from the 1963 Halle Zonal tournament into his first Interzonal the next year. At Halle, he tied 3rd–4th places with 12/19, then defeated Karl Robatsch by 2–0 in a playoff for the last berth. At Beverwijk 1963, he shared 3rd–5th places with 11/17, as Jan Hein Donner won.

Ivkov won his second Yugoslav title at Zenica 1964 with 15/21, shared with Mijo Udovčić. At Havana 1963, he scored very well with 15½/21, but this was only good enough for a shared 5th–6th place, as Korchnoi won. Ivkov shared 2nd–3rd places at Belgrade 1964 on 11½/17 behind Boris Spassky. At Beverwijk 1964, he was 4th with 10/15 behind Estonian winners Paul Keres and Iivo Nei. Then at Sarajevo 1964, he finished 3rd with 9½/15 as Lev Polugaevsky won.

== World Championship Candidate ==
Ivkov qualified from the 1964 Amsterdam Interzonal to the Candidates' matches the next year, with a score of 15/23. But he lost his first-round/quarterfinal Candidates' match at Zagreb to Bent Larsen by 5½–2½. He played at the Interzonal level four more times, but did not advance further. He narrowly missed moving on at age 46 in 1979.

- 1967 Sousse: 11/21, 11th out of 22;
- 1970 Palma de Mallorca: 10½/23, 14th out of 24;
- 1973 Petrópolis: 9/17, tied 9th–10th out of 18;
- 1979 Rio de Janeiro: 9½/17, 6th out of 18.

Ivkov played board ten in the Russia (USSR) vs Rest of the World team match at Belgrade 1970, but lost his match 3–1 to Paul Keres.

== Continued excellence ==
At Capablanca Memorial in Havana 1965, Ivkov shared 2nd–4th places with Geller and Fischer, and defeated Fischer for the second time in their game; the winner was Smyslov. In fact he was leading before he blew an easily won game against Gilberto Garcia, the latter of whom had lost most of his games at that point; this would have been his greatest victory. Ivkov shared 2nd–3rd places in the Yugoslav Championship at Titograd 1966 with 11½/18 as Gligoric won. Then at Zagreb 1965, Ivkov scored perhaps his most impressive career victory, sharing the title with Wolfgang Uhlmann on 13½/19, ahead of World Champion Tigran Petrosian, Lajos Portisch, Larsen, and Bronstein. Ivkov won at Venice 1966 with 5/7. He ended 4th at Beverwijk 1966 on 10/15 as Polugaevsky won. Ivkov won at Eersel 1966 with 4/5. He had a disappointing result at the elite Piatigorsky Cup tournament at Santa Monica, California, finishing with a minus score, as Spassky won. But then he nearly won the 1966 Open Canadian Chess Championship at Kingston. He shared 3rd–4th at Sarajevo 1966 with 10/15, behind winners Mikhail Tal and Dragoljub Čirić. He was 4th at Palma de Mallorca 1966 with 9½/15 behind winner Tal.

In the Yugoslav Championship at Kraljevo 1967, he ended tied 2nd–6th behind winner Milan Matulović. At Maribor 1967, he shared 3rd–5th places with 9/15, with Wolfgang Unzicker winning. He was 6th at Palma de Mallorca 1967 with 10/17, with Larsen winning. Then he shared the title at Sarajevo 1967 on 10½/15 with Leonid Stein. Ivkov won the Zonal tournament at Vrnjačka Banja 1967 with 12/17 to qualify for the Interzonal later that year. He shared the title at Málaga 1968 with Dražen Marović on 7½/11. From the Raach Zonal 1969, he advanced to the Interzonal after sharing 2nd–5th places with Portisch, Jan Smejkal, and Ulf Andersson, then winning a further playoff. He was 3rd at Vršac 1969 with 9½/15 behind winner Dragoljub Janosevic. He also won in Belgrade 1969 tournament (tied with Gligorić, Polugaevsky and Matulovic, ahead of Geller and Botvinnik).

At Budapest 1970, Ivkov shared 3rd–4th places with 8½/15 as Keres won. At Caracas 1970, Ivkov shared 4th–6th places with 11½/17, behind winner Lubomir Kavalek; Ivkov defeated rising star Anatoly Karpov. Ivkov won at Stockholm 1970 with 6½/9. He was third at Wijk aan Zee 1970 with 10/15 behind Taimanov. At Rovinj/Zagreb 1970, he scored 9/17 for a tied 7th–8th place, as Fischer won. At Wijk aan Zee 1971, Ivkov shared 2nd–5th places on 9½/15, as Korchnoi won. Ivkov shared the title at the 1972 Caorle Zonal tournament on 12/17 with Ljubomir Ljubojević, to qualify for the next year's Interzonal.

Ivkov won his third Yugoslav title at Umag 1972 with 12/19. He tied 2nd–3rd places at Bauang, La Union 1973 on 6½/9 behind Kavalek. Then he shared the title at Amsterdam 1974 on 10/15 with Vlastimil Jansa and Vladimir Tukmakov.

== Later years ==
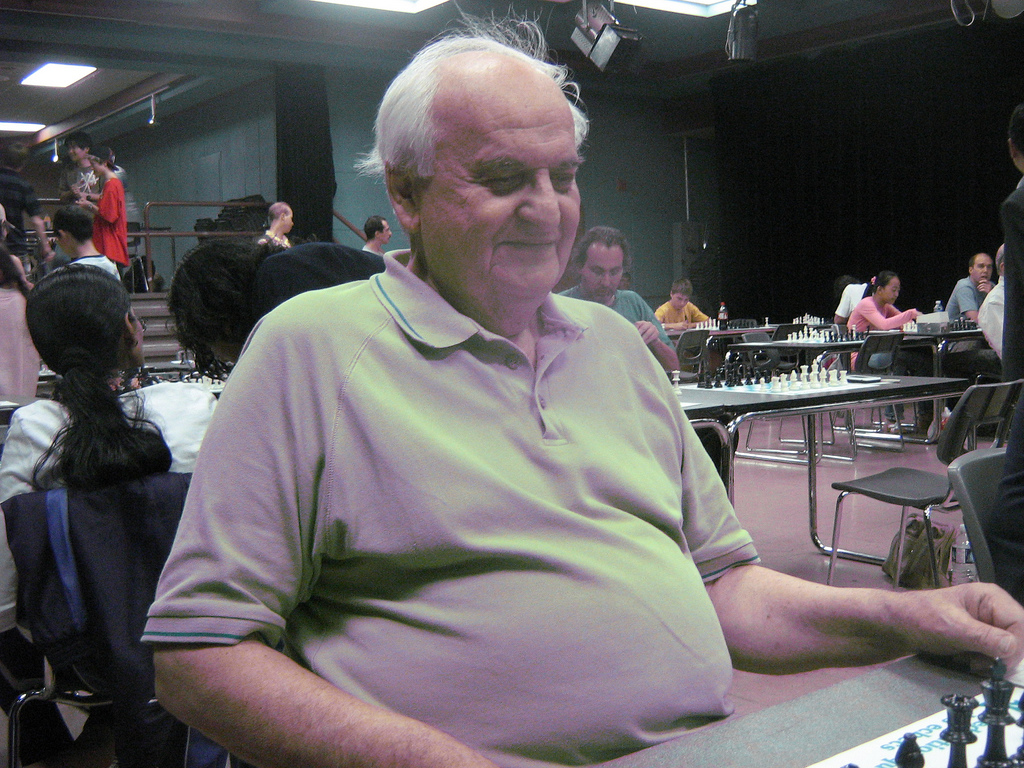
Ivkov in 2008

Ivkov fell out of the top 40 after 1975, and appeared less frequently in major events. But he still had some notable results later in his career. He was 2nd at Štip 1977 with 8½/13, behind Hort. At Bor 1984, he shared 2nd–4th places with 8½/13 behind winner Slobodan Martinovic. He won the traditional Capablanca Memorial tournament, played at Cienfuegos in 1985 with 10/13. In the 1991 Yugoslav Championship at Kladovo, he shared 4th–7th places with 9/13. Ivkov shared 2nd–9th places in the 1998 World Senior Championship at Grieskirchen on 8/11 behind champion Vladimir Bagirov. His most impressive late-career feat was a shared 1st–2nd place in the strong Tigran Petrosian Memorial at Moscow 1999 with 5/9, along with Portisch. Ivkov tied 2nd–4th places in the 25th anniversary Paul Keres Memorial at Vancouver with 7½/10, behind winner Vladimir Epishin. He was awarded the International Arbiter title in 1986.

Ivkov's last FIDE rated tournament was a "Snowdrops vs Old Hands" event held in late 2013.

== Rating and ranking ==
During his prime in the 1950s and 1960s, Ivkov was one of the 20 best players in the world. When the Elo rating system was introduced in the early 1970s, Ivkov had a rating of 2560. This placed him in the top 30 best players in the world. His highest Historical Chessmetrics Rating was 2715, in October 1956, making him the 9th highest rated player at that moment.

== Personal life and death ==
With his wife Olga María Kesic, Ivkov had a son and a grandson. With his second wife, Branka Vujnovic, he had two children.

Ivkov died on 14 February 2022, at the age of 88.

== Legacy and playing style ==
Ivkov defeated five World Champions: Vasily Smyslov, Mikhail Tal, Tigran Petrosian, Bobby Fischer, and Anatoly Karpov. He also scored wins over most of the top players of his era, except Mikhail Botvinnik and Paul Keres. Head-to-head, he was dominated by such stars as Gligoric, Tal, and Larsen.

Ivkov's style is classical, and he opened regularly with both 1.e4 and 1.d4 during his peak years, making him problematic to prepare for. As Black, he replied to 1.e4 with the Sicilian Defence, the French Defence, and 1...e5, showing a wide repertoire which he handled well. While usually tending toward solid positional play, Ivkov could switch to fierce tactics when given the opportunity. During his peak years, he played in many high-class tournaments, and was almost always near the top of the table.

== Notable games ==
- Borislav Ivkov vs Vasja Pirc, Bled 1950, Nimzo-Indian Defence, Saemisch Variation (E28), 1–0 Pirc was a five-time Yugoslav champion, so for the 17-year-old Ivkov, this win helped build his reputation.
- Borislav Ivkov vs Tigran Petrosian, Belgrade 1954, Sicilian Defence, Richter–Rauzer Variation (B63), 1–0 Petrosian had been a World Championship Candidate the year before.
- Borislav Ivkov vs Ludek Pachman, Buenos Aires 1955, Sicilian Defence, Accelerated Dragon Variation (B34), 1–0 On his first trip outside Europe, Ivkov has a strong Argentinian showing.
- Borislav Ivkov vs Mark Taimanov, Hastings 1955, Sicilian Defence, Classical Variation (B56), 1–0 Another Candidate has to concede defeat; Ivkov enjoyed excellent career success against Taimanov.
- Borislav Ivkov vs Lajos Portisch, Bled 1961, French Defence, Winawer Variation (C18), 1–0 These two players would meet many more times, with Portisch eventually establishing an edge.
- Borislav Ivkov vs Laszlo Szabo, Sarajevo 1963, Sicilian Defence, Taimanov Variation (B47), 1–0 Ivkov overcomes the nine-time Hungarian champion.
- Pal Benko vs Borislav Ivkov, Tel Aviv Olympiad 1964, Queen's Gambit Declined (D37), 0–1 Ivkov destroys Benko in a tactical slugfest miniature.
- Bobby Fischer vs Borislav Ivkov, Havana 1965, Ruy Lopez, Closed Variation (C96), 0–1 Fischer lost very rarely with White, so this is an impressive game.
- Borislav Ivkov vs Vasily Smyslov, Havana 1965, Queen's Gambit, Slav Defence, Exchange Variation (D13), 1–0 Ivkov takes off the former World Champion and winner of this tournament.
- Svetozar Gligoric vs Borislav Ivkov, Zagreb 1965, Nimzo-Indian Defence, Rubinstein Variation (E56), 0–1 It took Ivkov nearly 20 years to defeat Gligoric, the top Yugoslav post-war player.
- Borislav Ivkov vs David Bronstein, Zagreb 1965, King's Indian Defence, Fianchetto Variation (E62), 1–0 Defeating Bronstein in the King's Indian is always a notable feat.
- Borislav Ivkov vs Bent Larsen, Santa Monica 1966, Queen's Indian Defence (E16), 1–0 Larsen defeated Ivkov in their match, and had the career edge, but Ivkov gets a nice win here.
- Efim Geller vs Borislav Ivkov, Belgrade 1969, Sicilian Defence, Scheveningen Variation (B84), 0–1 Geller was a powerful theoretician, but he meets his match on this day.
- Borislav Ivkov vs Anatoly Karpov, Caracas 1970, Queen's Gambit Declined, Tartakower Variation (D58), 1–0 Karpov miscalculates and gets annihilated by a beautiful attack.
- Vlastimil Hort vs Borislav Ivkov, Petropolis Interzonal 1973, Nimzo-Indian Defence, Classical Variation (E39), 0–1
