= Mario Bertok =

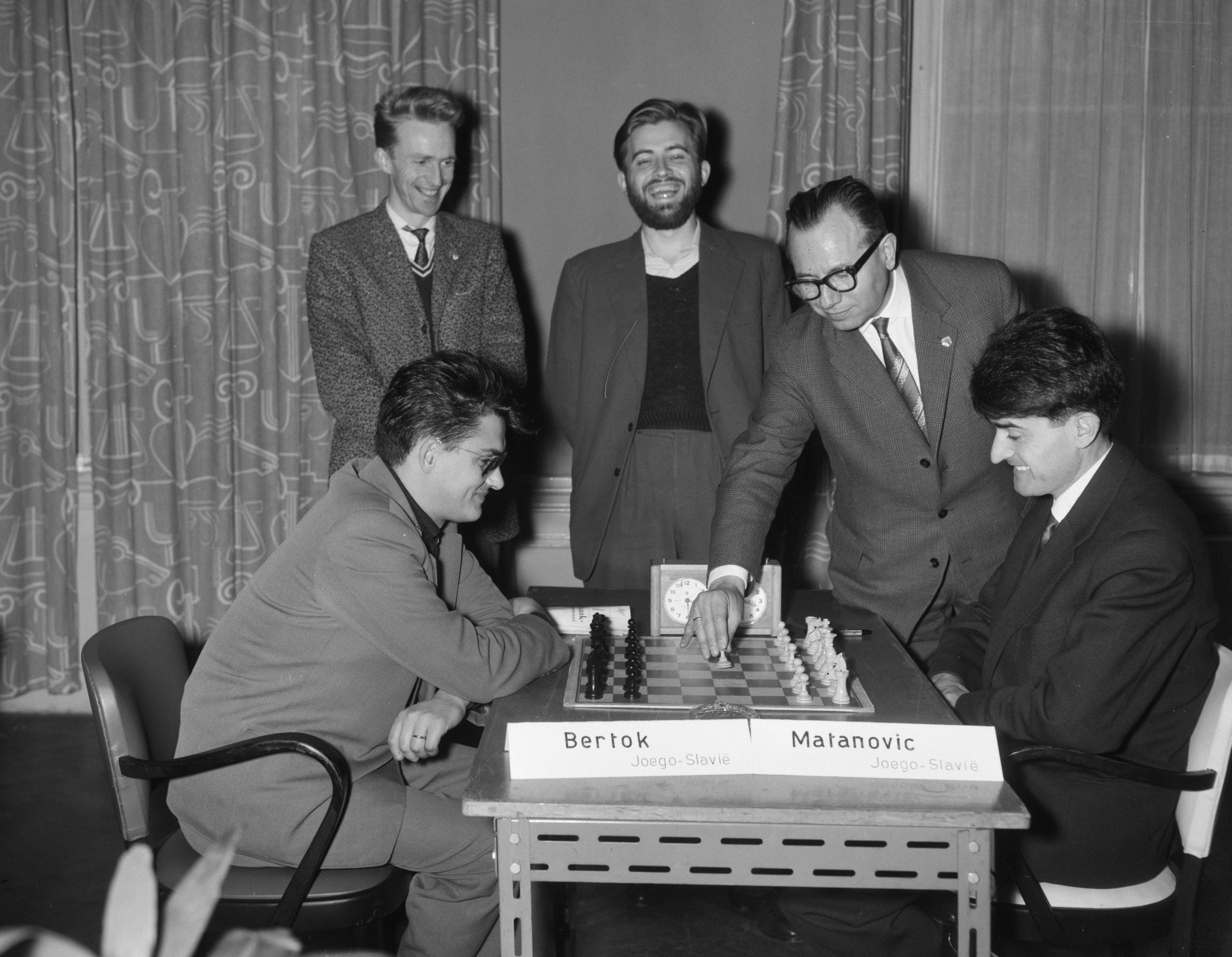
Bertok vs. Aleksandar Matanović (1960)

Mario Bertok (2 September 1929 – 20 August 2008) was a Croatian chess master and sports journalist, writing for the Sportske novosti daily sports newspaper. He was born in Zagreb, Yugoslavia.

== Career ==
Bertok earned the International Master title in 1957. He represented Yugoslavia on board four at the 1960 Chess Olympiad, scoring +5=5−3. A second-place finish in the 1960 Yugoslav Championship earned Bertok a berth in the 1960 Budapest Zonal where he placed 2nd, taking third after a playoff. At the 1962 Stockholm Interzonal he finished 17th. His best international result was Rovinj-Zagreb 1970 where he finished 9th=.

== Personal Life and Death ==
Bertok's wife was a well-known Yugoslav actress Semka Sokolović-Bertok (1935–2008), who herself was a competitive chess player in her youth.

On 20 August 2008, Bertok was reported missing after a few hours of swimming off the shores of Jarun Lake; his body was recovered from the lake later the same day.
