= Aleksandar Matanović =

Serbian chess grandmaster (1930–2023)

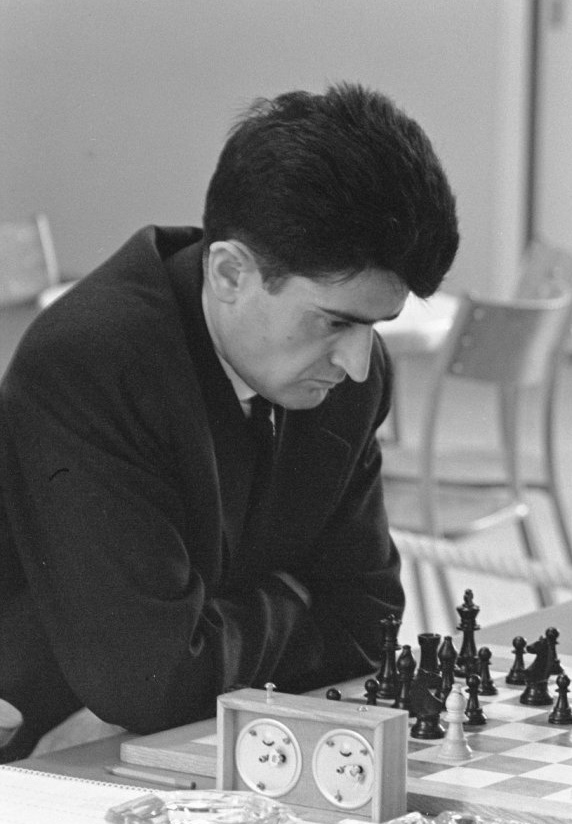
- Matanović competing in 1961

Personal information
- Born: 23 May 1930 Belgrade, Yugoslavia
- Died: 9 August 2023 (aged 93) Belgrade, Serbia

Chess career
- Country: Serbia
- Title: Grandmaster (1955)
- Peak rating: 2525 (January 1976)
- Peak ranking: No. 54 (January 1976)

Aleksandar Matanović (Serbian Cyrillic: Александар Матановић; 23 May 1930 – 9 August 2023) was a Serbian chess grandmaster, one of the leading Yugoslav players in the 1950s to 1970s. In 1966 he founded the company Chess Informant, which publishes regular game collections from recent major tournaments and the Encyclopaedia of Chess Openings.

== Chess career ==
Matanović was junior champion of Yugoslavia in 1948 and awarded the Grandmaster (GM) title in 1955. He was Yugoslav champion in 1962 (joint with Minić), 1969 and 1978. He took second place in 1950, 1956, 1959, 1963, 1967 (joint with Ivkov, Ćirić and Bogdanović) and 1975 (joint with Gligorić and Ljubojević).

His most successful tournament results included first place at Opatija 1953 (ahead of Fuderer, Rabar, Pirc, Ivkov and Unzicker), second at Belgrade 1954 (behind Bronstein, ahead of Trifunović, Ivkov , Gligorić, Petrosian and Pilnik), second at Zagreb 1955 (behind Smyslov, tied with Ivkov, ahead of Geller and Gligorić), first at Hamburg 1955, first at Beverwijk 1957, tied for first at Buenos Aires 1961, first at Zevenaar 1961, second at Jerusalem 1964, second place at the Vrnjacka Banja zonal tournament 1967 etc. Matanović participated in four interzonal tournaments, his best result being a tie for seventh place in Portorož, Slovenia in 1958. Although he narrowly missed the chance to participate in the 1959 Candidates Tournament, he was the only player to defeat the interzonal winner, future world champion Mikhail Tal. Dutch GM Hein Donner wrote: "Only Matanovic managed to hold his own against him. He fought him with his own weapons. The Yugoslav unleashed such concentrated violence that Tal caved in. It was one of the best and also one of the longest games of the tournament."

Matanović defeated many other leading players, including Efim Bogoljubov, Savielly Tartakower, Svetozar Gligorić, Paul Keres, Efim Geller, Bent Larsen, Lajos Portisch, Leonid Stein, Vlastimil Hort, Fridrik Olafsson, Lev Polugaevsky, Tigran Petrosian, Ljubomir Ljubojevic, Ulf Andersson, Jan Timman and Borislav Ivkov.

Aleksandar Matanović
Medal record

Representing Yugoslavia

Men's chess

Olympiad
Bronze medal – third place	1954 Amsterdam	Open team
Bronze medal – third place	1954 Amsterdam	Individual board 2nd reserve
Silver medal – second place	1956 Moscow	Open team
Silver medal – second place	1956 Moscow	Individual board 2
Silver medal – second place	1958 Munich	Open team
Bronze medal – third place	1960 Leipzig	Open team
Silver medal – second place	1962 Varna	Open team
Silver medal – second place	1964 Tel Aviv	Open team
Silver medal – second place	1966 Havana	Individual board 4
Silver medal – second place	1968 Lugano	Open team
Bronze medal – third place	1970 Siegen	Open team
Gold medal – first place	1970 Siegen	Individual board 4
Bronze medal – third place	1972 Skopje	Open team

European Championship
Silver medal – second place	1957 Vienna	Open team
Silver medal – second place	1961 Oberhausen	Open team
Silver medal – second place	1965 Hamburg	Open team
Silver medal – second place	1973 Bath	Open team
Bronze medal – third place	1977 Moscow	Open team
Silver medal – second place	1977 Moscow	Individual board 3

Matanović represented Yugoslavia in 11 Chess Olympiads (1954–1972, 1978) playing alongside some of the greatest players in the world such as GMs Svetozar Gligorić, Borislav Ivkov, Petar Trifunović and Ljubomir Ljubojevic. This was during a golden age of Serbian chess, a period when Yugoslavia (led by Serbian grandmasters) was usually among the top three chess countries. He won a total of nine team medals and four board medals during his career.

- Amsterdam 1954: board 2nd reserve, 6½/9 (+5−1=3), board bronze, team bronze
- Moscow 1956: board 2, 11½/16 (+7−0=9), board silver, team silver
- Munich 1958: board 2, 9½/13 (+7−1=5), board 4th, team silver
- Leipzig 1960: board 2, 10½/17 (+6−2=9), team bronze
- Varna 1962: board 3, 8½/15 (+5−3=7), team silver
- Tel Aviv 1964: board 3, 9½/15 (+6−2=7), team silver
- Havana 1966: board 4, 10½ 14 (+7−0=7), board silver
- Lugano 1968: board 3, 9/13 (+5−0=8), team silver
- Siegen 1970: board 4, 10/12 (+8−0=4), board gold, team bronze
- Skopje 1972: board 4, 7/12 (+3−1=8), team bronze
- Buenos Aires 1978: board 3, 5/10 (+2−2=6)

With 13 team and board medals at Chess Olympiad, Matanović is the second-most decorated Serbian and Yugoslav player of all time (tied with Svetozar Gligorić) behind Borislav Ivkov (14) and one of the ten-most decorated players in the Olympiad history. At the same time, his 9 team medals are the fourth-most all-time (tied with Vasily Smyslov) behind Borislav Ivkov (10), Tigran Petrosian (10) and Svetozar Gligorić (12).

Matanović made his first appearance at the European team level in the inaugural event at Vienna 1957, and was chosen on five further occasions. He won five team medals and one board medal in Euroteams events.

- Vienna 1957: board 2, 2½/6 (+0−1=5), team silver
- Oberhausen 1961: board 3, 7/10 (+4−0=6), team silver
- Hamburg 1965: board 3, 5½/10 (+3−2=5), team silver
- Bath 1973: board 4, 4/7 (+1−0=6), board 4th, team silver
- Moscow 1977: board 3, 3/6 (+1−1=4), board silver, team bronze

Matanović also represented Yugoslavia 14 times in the USSR versus Yugoslavia matches held from the 1950s to the 1970s.

== Rating and ranking ==
During his prime in the 1950s, Matanovic was one of the 20 best players in the world. When the Elo rating system was introduced in the early 1970s, Matanovic had a rating of 2525 (world number 54). His highest Historical Chessmetrics Rating was 2698, in October 1956, making him the 15th highest rated player at that moment. His best ranking was world number 14 in January 1958.

== Chess Informant ==
Despite a distinguished chess career during which he was also a radio announcer and producer, Matanović's most important achievement will always be the leading pre-digital chess publication of which he was a co-founder and its driving force. In 1966, together with Milivoje Molerovic, Matanović founded the company Chess Informant (Шаховски Информатор in Serbian) and started publishing books with the same name twice a year. In a time without the internet, chess databases or engines, Informant provided access to large collections of recent top-level games to all chess players from both sides of the Iron Curtain. The bulk of the content consists of diagrams of positions and chess moves, annotated with symbols, many of them developed by Chess Informant. In that way Chess Informant pioneered the use of Figurine Algebraic Notation to avoid the use of initials for the names of the pieces, which vary between languages. The Chess Informant system of codes for the classification of chess openings, and its system of symbols have set the international standard for organizing chess information and communicating this information across language barriers. For two decades prior to the emergence of computer databases, Chess Informant publications were a leading source of games and analysis for serious chess players so much so that many professionals would carry more Informants than clothes in their luggage.

Former world champion Garry Kasparov asserted, "We are all children of Informant" and then explained that his own development as a chess player corresponded with the ascent of Chess Informant's popularity. Chess Informant was considered the chess bible by Bobby Fischer who pored over each issue, studying all the games – as shown in the famous "Bobby The Champ" photograph, taken in Reykjavik 1972. Other world champions, including Anatoly Karpov, Vladimir Kramnik and Viswanathan Anand attest that Informant is central to their tournament preparation.

As the number of chess tournaments grew, so did the number of editions of the Informant. Two issues per year were published from 1966 to 1990, three issues from 1991 to 2011 and four issues since 2012. From millions of games played at some of the most important tournaments on the globe, more than 110,000 games have been published in the first 112 volumes of the Chess Informant series (1966–2011). Among contributors there were more than 5000 notable chess players including all the world champions from Max Euwe to Anand.

About the enormous influence Chess Informant had on chess, Matanović said: "[L]ittle did we know that we were trailblazing a path towards an era yet to come—the information era."

== Later years and death ==
Matanović participated in the memorial tournament held in Moscow in 2007 to commemorate the great chess rivalry between the USSR and Yugoslavia. He drew his two games with GM Mark Taimanov which were the last two official matches of his career. The USSR team also had GMs Viktor Korchnoi, Yuri Averbakh, Evgeni Vasiukov and Yuri Balashov while GMs Svetozar Gligorić, Borislav Ivkov, Dragoljub Velimirovic and Nikola Karaklajic were Matanović's teammates for Yugoslavia. The final score was 11–9 for the USSR.

In February 2023, Matanović attended a chess ceremony held in Belgrade in honor of Gligorić's 100th birthday anniversary. He spoke about his 64-year-long friendship with Gligorić, from the early days of youth competitions to chess Olympiads, matches and tournaments: "We were opponents on the chessboard, friends for 64 years. These 64 black and white squares brought us together and decided both his and my life path."

Following the death of Yuri Averbakh at the age of 100 on 7 May 2022, Matanović became the oldest living grandmaster.

Matanović died on 9 August 2023, at the age of 93.

== Bibliography ==
- Encyclopaedia of Chess Openings (five volumes), Chess Informant
- Encyclopaedia of Chess Endings (five volumes), Chess Informant
- Chess as a Destiny
