= Scheveningen system =

System for chess matches between teams

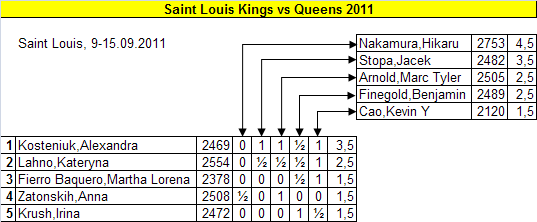
Final standings of Kings vs. Queens 2011, tournament under Scheveningen system.

The Scheveningen system (Dutch pronunciation: [ˈsxeːvənɪŋə(n)]) is a method of organizing a chess match between two teams. Each player on one team plays each player on the other team. The team with the highest number of games won is the winner. This system was a popular way to create title norm opportunities. However, effective from March 2024, it is no longer be possible to achieve title norms from Scheveningen tournaments.

The system was first used in a tournament in Scheveningen, Netherlands in 1923. The idea behind it was that a team of ten Dutch players could face ten foreign masters. This has the intention of giving the players on the team experience against strong competition.

== Standard Scheveningen Tables ==
Match on 2 Boards

Round 1	A1-B1	A2-B2
Round 2	B2-A1	B1-A2

Match on 3 Boards

Round 1	A1-B1	A2-B2	B3-A3
Round 2	B2-A1	A2-B3	B1-A3
Round 3	A1-B3	B1-A2	A3-B2

Match on 4 Boards

Round 1	A1-B1	A2-B2	B3-A3	B4-A4
Round 2	B2-A1	B1-A2	A3-B4	A4-B3
Round 3	A1-B3	A2-B4	B1-A3	B2-A4
Round 4	B4-A1	B3-A2	A3-B2	A4-B1

Match on 5 Boards

Round 1	A1-B1	A2-B2	A3-B3	B4-A4	B5-A5
Round 2	B2-A1	B3-A2	A3-B4	A4-B5	B1-A5
Round 3	A1-B3	A2-B4	B5-A3	B1-A4	A5-B2
Round 4	B4-A1	A2-B5	A3-B1	B2-A4	B3-A5
Round 5	A1-B5	B1-A2	B2-A3	A4-B3	A5-B4

Match on 6 Boards

Round 1	A1-B1	B2-A2	B3-A3	A4-B4	B5-A5	A6-B6
Round 2	B2-A1	A2-B3	A3-B5	B6-A4	A5-B4	B1-A6
Round 3	A1-B3	B5-A2	B1-A3	A4-B2	A5-B6	B4-A6
Round 4	B4-A1	B6-A2	A3-B2	A4-B1	B3-A5	A6-B5
Round 5	A1-B5	A2-B4	A3-B6	B3-A4	B1-A5	B2-A6
Round 6	B6-A1	A2-B1	B4-A3	B5-A4	A5-B2	A6-B3

Match on 7 Boards

Round 1	A1-B1	A2-B2	A3-B3	A4-B4	B5-A5	B6-A6	B7-A7
Round 2	B2-A1	B3-A2	B4-A3	A4-B5	A5-B6	A6-B7	B1-A7
Round 3	A1-B3	A2-B4	A3-B5	B6-A4	B7-A5	B1-A6	A7-B2
Round 4	B4-A1	B5-A2	A3-B6	A4-B7	A5-B1	B2-A6	B3-A7
Round 5	A1-B5	A2-B6	B7-A3	B1-A4	B2-A5	A6-B3	A7-B4
Round 6	B6-A1	A2-B7	A3-B1	A4-B2	B3-A5	B4-A6	B5-A7
Round 7	A1-B7	B1-A2	B2-A3	B3-A4	A5-B4	A6-B5	A7-B6

Match on 8 Boards

Round 1	A1-B1	A2-B2	A3-B3	A4-B4	B5-A5	B6-A6	B7-A7	B8-A8
Round 2	B2-A1	B3-A2	B4-A3	B1-A4	A5-B6	A6-B7	A7-B8	A8-B5
Round 3	A1-B3	A2-B4	A3-B1	A4-B2	B7-A5	B8-A6	B5-A7	B6-A8
Round 4	B4-A1	B1-A2	B2-A3	B3-A4	A5-B8	A6-B5	A7-B6	A8-B7
Round 5	A1-B5	A2-B6	A3-B7	A4-B8	B1-A5	B2-A6	B3-A7	B4-A8
Round 6	B6-A1	B7-A2	B8-A3	B5-A4	A5-B2	A6-B3	A7-B4	A8-B1
Round 7	A1-B7	A2-B8	A3-B5	A4-B6	B3-A5	B4-A6	B1-A7	B2-A8
Round 8	B8-A1	B5-A2	B6-A3	B7-A4	A5-B4	A6-B1	A7-B2	A8-B3

Match on 9 Boards

Round 1	A1-B1	A2-B2	A3-B3	A4-B4	A5-B5	B6-A6	B7-A7	B8-A8	B9-A9
Round 2	B2-A1	B3-A2	B4-A3	B5-A4	A5-B6	A6-B7	A7-B8	A8-B9	B1-A9
Round 3	A1-B3	A2-B4	A3-B5	A4-B6	B7-A5	B8-A6	B9-A7	B1-A8	A9-B2
Round 4	B4-A1	B5-A2	B6-A3	A4-B7	A5-B8	A6-B9	A7-B1	B2-A8	B3-A9
Round 5	A1-B5	A2-B6	A3-B7	B8-A4	B9-A5	B1-A6	B2-A7	A8-B3	A9-B4
Round 6	B6-A1	B7-A2	A3-B8	A4-B9	A5-B1	A6-B2	B3-A7	B4-A8	B5-A9
Round 7	A1-B7	A2-B8	B9-A3	B1-A4	B2-A5	B3-A6	A7-B4	A8-B5	A9-B6
Round 8	B8-A1	A2-B9	A3-B1	A4-B2	A5-B3	B4-A6	B5-A7	B6-A8	B7-A9
Round 9	A1-B9	B1-A2	B2-A3	B3-A4	B4-A5	A6-B5	A7-B6	A8-B7	A9-B8

Match on 10 Boards

Round 1	A1-B1	A2-B2	A3-B3	A4-B4	B5-A5	B6-A6	B7-A7	A8-B8	B9-A9	B10-A10
Round 2	B2-A1	B1-A2	B8-A3	B3-A4	A5-B10	A6-B5	A7-B6	B4-A8	A9-B7	A10-B9
Round 3	A1-B3	A2-B8	A3-B4	A4-B10	B6-A5	B7-A6	B9-A7	A8-B1	B2-A9	B5-A10
Round 4	B4-A1	B3-A2	B10-A3	A4-B6	A5-B7	B8-A6	A7-B5	A8-B9	B1-A9	A10-B2
Round 5	A1-B5	A2-B4	B9-A3	B7-A4	B1-A5	A6-B10	B8-A7	B2-A8	A9-B3	A10-B6
Round 6	B6-A1	A2-B7	A3-B1	A4-B9	A5-B8	A6-B2	B10-A7	B5-A8	B4-A9	B3-A10
Round 7	A1-B7	B5-A2	B2-A3	B1-A4	B4-A5	B9-A6	A7-B3	A8-B10	A9-B6	A10-B8
Round 8	B8-A1	B6-A2	A3-B5	A4-B2	A5-B9	A6-B1	A7-B4	B3-A8	B10-A9	B7-A10
Round 9	A1-B9	A2-B10	A3-B7	B5-A4	B2-A5	B3-A6	B1-A7	A8-B6	A9-B8	B4-A10
Round 10	B10-A1	B9-A2	B6-A3	B8-A4	A5-B3	A6-B4	A7-B2	B7-A8	A9-B5	A10-B1

Match on 11 Boards

Round 1	A1-B1	A2-B2	A3-B3	A4-B4	A5-B5	A6-B6	B7-A7	B8-A8	B9-A9	B10-A10	B11-A11
Round 2	B2-A1	B3-A2	B4-A3	B5-A4	B6-A5	A6-B7	A7-B8	A8-B9	A9-B10	A10-B11	B1-A11
Round 3	A1-B3	A2-B4	A3-B5	A4-B6	A5-B7	B8-A6	B9-A7	B10-A8	B11-A9	B1-A10	A11-B2
Round 4	B4-A1	B5-A2	B6-A3	B7-A4	A5-B8	A6-B9	A7-B10	A8-B11	A9-B1	B2-A10	B3-A11
Round 5	A1-B5	A2-B6	A3-B7	A4-B8	B9-A5	B10-A6	B11-A7	B1-A8	B2-A9	A10-B3	A11-B4
Round 6	B6-A1	B7-A2	B8-A3	A4-B9	A5-B10	A6-B11	A7-B1	A8-B2	B3-A9	B4-A10	B5-A11
Round 7	A1-B7	A2-B8	A3-B9	B10-A4	B11-A5	B1-A6	B2-A7	B3-A8	A9-B4	A10-B5	A11-B6
Round 8	B8-A1	B9-A2	A3-B10	A4-B11	A5-B1	A6-B2	A7-B3	B4-A8	B5-A9	B6-A10	B7-A11
Round 9	A1-B9	A2-B10	B11-A3	B1-A4	B2-A5	B3-A6	B4-A7	A8-B5	A9-B6	A10-B7	A11-B8
Round 10	B10-A1	A2-B11	A3-B1	A4-B2	A5-B3	A6-B4	B5-A7	B6-A8	B7-A9	B8-A10	B9-A11
Round 11	A1-B11	B1-A2	B2-A3	B3-A4	B4-A5	B5-A6	A7-B6	A8-B7	A9-B8	A10-B9	A11-B10

Match on 12 Boards

Round 1	A1-B1	A2-B2	A3-B3	A4-B4	A5-B5	A6-B6	B7-A7	B8-A8	B9-A9	B10-A10	B11-A11	B12-A12
Round 2	B2-A1	B3-A2	B4-A3	B5-A4	B6-A5	B1-A6	A7-B8	A8-B9	A9-B10	A10-B11	A11-B12	A12-B7
Round 3	A1-B3	A2-B4	A3-B5	A4-B6	A5-B1	A6-B2	B9-A7	B10-A8	B11-A9	B12-A10	B7-A11	B8-A12
Round 4	B4-A1	B5-A2	B6-A3	B1-A4	B2-A5	B3-A6	A7-B10	A8-B11	A9-B12	A10-B7	A11-B8	A12-B9
Round 5	A1-B5	A2-B6	A3-B1	A4-B2	A5-B3	A6-B4	B11-A7	B12-A8	B7-A9	B8-A10	B9-A11	B10-A12
Round 6	B6-A1	B1-A2	B2-A3	B3-A4	B4-A5	B5-A6	A7-B12	A8-B7	A9-B8	A10-B9	A11-B10	A12-B11
Round 7	A1-B7	A2-B8	A3-B9	A4-B10	A5-B11	A6-B12	B1-A7	B2-A8	B3-A9	B4-A10	B5-A11	B6-A12
Round 8	B8-A1	B9-A2	B10-A3	B11-A4	B12-A5	B7-A6	A7-B2	A8-B3	A9-B4	A10-B5	A11-B6	A12-B1
Round 9	A1-B9	A2-B10	A3-B11	A4-B12	A5-B7	A6-B8	B3-A7	B4-A8	B5-A9	B6-A10	B1-A11	B2-A12
Round 10	B10-A1	B11-A2	B12-A3	B7-A4	B8-A5	B9-A6	A7-B4	A8-B5	A9-B6	A10-B1	A11-B2	A12-B3
Round 11	A1-B11	A2-B12	A3-B7	A4-B8	A5-B9	A6-B10	B5-A7	B6-A8	B1-A9	B2-A10	B3-A11	B4-A12
Round 12	B12-A1	B7-A2	B8-A3	B9-A4	B10-A5	B11-A6	A7-B6	A8-B1	A9-B2	A10-B3	A11-B4	A12-B5

Match on 13 Boards

Round 1	A1-B1	A2-B2	A3-B3	A4-B4	A5-B5	A6-B6	A7-B7	B8-A8	B9-A9	B10-A10	B11-A11	B12-A12	B13-A13
Round 2	B2-A1	B3-A2	B4-A3	B5-A4	B6-A5	B7-A6	A7-B8	A8-B9	A9-B10	A10-B11	A11-B12	A12-B13	B1-A13
Round 3	A1-B3	A2-B4	A3-B5	A4-B6	A5-B7	A6-B8	B9-A7	B10-A8	B11-A9	B12-A10	B13-A11	B1-A12	A13-B2
Round 4	B4-A1	B5-A2	B6-A3	B7-A4	B8-A5	A6-B9	A7-B10	A8-B11	A9-B12	A10-B13	A11-B1	B2-A12	B3-A13
Round 5	A1-B5	A2-B6	A3-B7	A4-B8	A5-B9	B10-A6	B11-A7	B12-A8	B13-A9	B1-A10	B2-A11	A12-B3	A13-B4
Round 6	B6-A1	B7-A2	B8-A3	B9-A4	A5-B10	A6-B11	A7-B12	A8-B13	A9-B1	A10-B2	B3-A11	B4-A12	B5-A13
Round 7	A1-B7	A2-B8	A3-B9	A4-B10	B11-A5	B12-A6	B13-A7	B1-A8	B2-A9	B3-A10	A11-B4	A12-B5	A13-B6
Round 8	B8-A1	B9-A2	B10-A3	A4-B11	A5-B12	A6-B13	A7-B1	A8-B2	A9-B3	B4-A10	B5-A11	B6-A12	B7-A13
Round 9	A1-B9	A2-B10	A3-B11	B12-A4	B13-A5	B1-A6	B2-A7	B3-A8	B4-A9	A10-B5	A11-B6	A12-B7	A13-B8
Round 10	B10-A1	B11-A2	A3-B12	A4-B13	A5-B1	A6-B2	A7-B3	A8-B4	B5-A9	B6-A10	B7-A11	B8-A12	B9-A13
Round 11	A1-B11	A2-B12	B13-A3	B1-A4	B2-A5	B3-A6	B4-A7	B5-A8	A9-B6	A10-B7	A11-B8	A12-B9	A13-B10
Round 12	B12-A1	A2-B13	A3-B1	A4-B2	A5-B3	A6-B4	A7-B5	B6-A8	B7-A9	B8-A10	B9-A11	B10-A12	B11-A13
Round 13	A1-B13	B1-A2	B2-A3	B3-A4	B4-A5	B5-A6	B6-A7	A8-B7	A9-B8	A10-B9	A11-B10	A12-B11	A13-B12

Note for all tables:

- In the n-th round the player A1 plays with the player Bn.
- Player A1 changes color in the next round.
- In the first round the player An plays with the player Bn.

== Use in other sports ==
In rugby union, the Nations Championship sees each competing team from the Northern Hemisphere play against each competing team from the Southern Hemisphere in a Scheveningen-style system. Teams from the same hemisphere do not play against each other in this tournament. At the end of the series, the top-ranked Northern Hemisphere team and the top-ranked Southern Hemisphere team will play against each other in a grand final.

== See also ==
- Round-robin tournament
