= Efim Geller =

Soviet chess grandmaster (1925–1998)

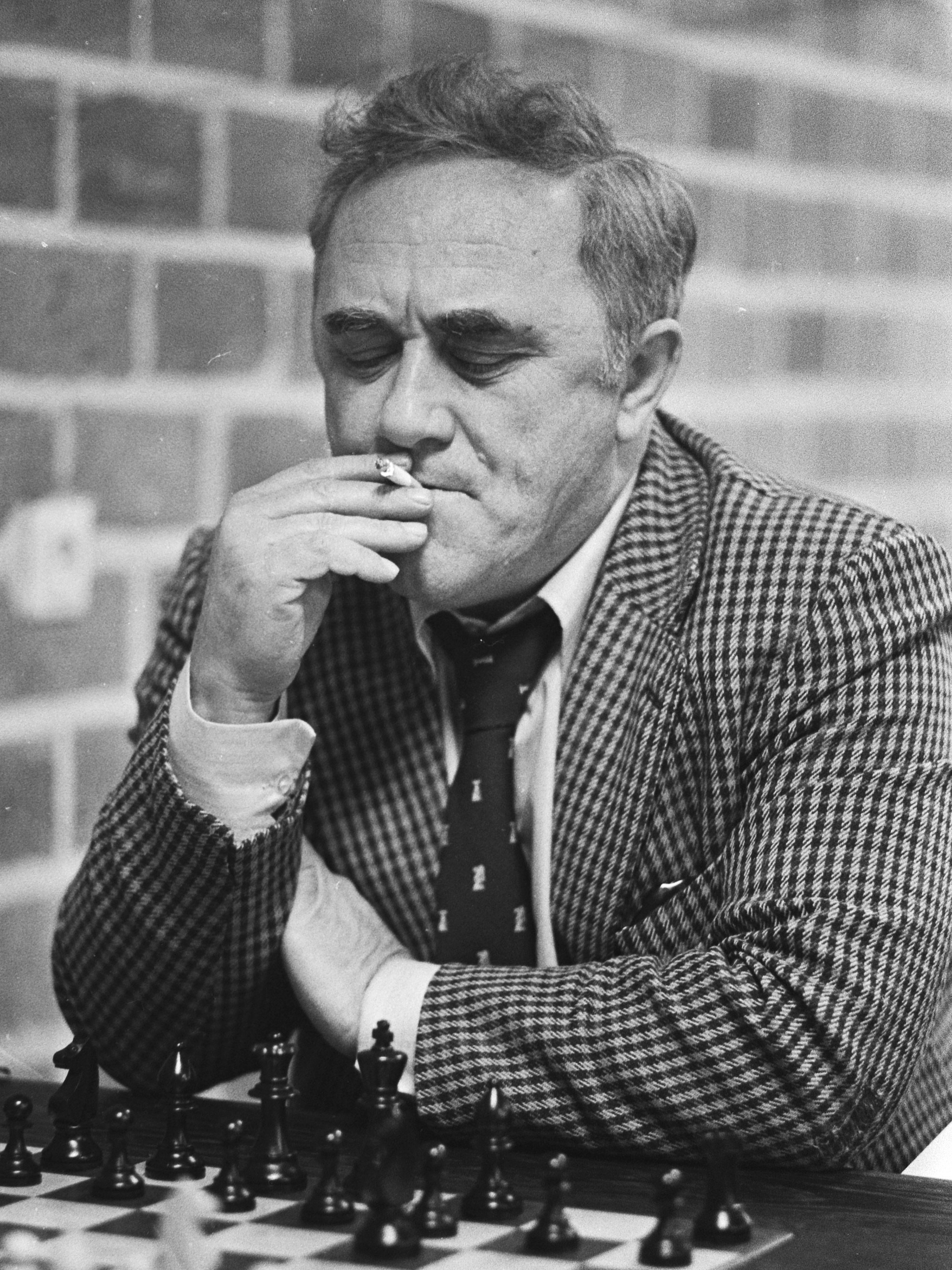
- Geller in 1977

Personal information
- Born: Efim Petrovich Geller; 8 March 1925 Odessa, Ukrainian SSR, Soviet Union
- Died: 17 November 1998 (aged 73) Moscow, Russia

Chess career
- Country: Soviet Union → Russia
- Title: Grandmaster (1952)
- Peak rating: 2620 (January 1976)
- Peak ranking: No. 8 (January 1976)

Efim Petrovich Geller (Russian: Ефим Петрович Геллер; Ukrainian: Юхим Петрович Геллер; 8 March 1925 – 17 November 1998) was a Soviet chess player and world-class grandmaster at his peak. He won the Soviet Championship twice (in 1955 and 1979) and was a Candidate for the World Championship on six occasions (1953, 1956, 1962, 1965, 1968, and 1971). He won four Ukrainian SSR Championship titles (in 1950, 1957, 1958, and 1959) and shared first in the 1991 World Seniors' Championship, winning the title outright in 1992.

His wife Oksana was a ballet dancer while his son Alexander was also a chess master. Geller was coach to World Champions Boris Spassky and Anatoly Karpov. He was also an author.

== Early life ==
Geller grew up in Odessa, Soviet Union, and was Jewish. He was a fine basketball player, and earned his doctorate in physical education before specialising in chess. His father was a First Category chess player. His development as a top player was delayed by the inception of World War II.

Geller's first notable result was sixth place in the 1947 Ukrainian SSR Chess Championship at Kiev with 9½/15; the winner was Alexei Sokolsky. He shared 3rd–5th places at Baku 1948 with 9/15, an event won by Jüri Randviir. Geller scored 11/18 at the 1948 Ukrainian SSR Championship in Kiev for a shared 5th–8th place; the winners were Sokolsky and Poliak.

== Grandmaster ==
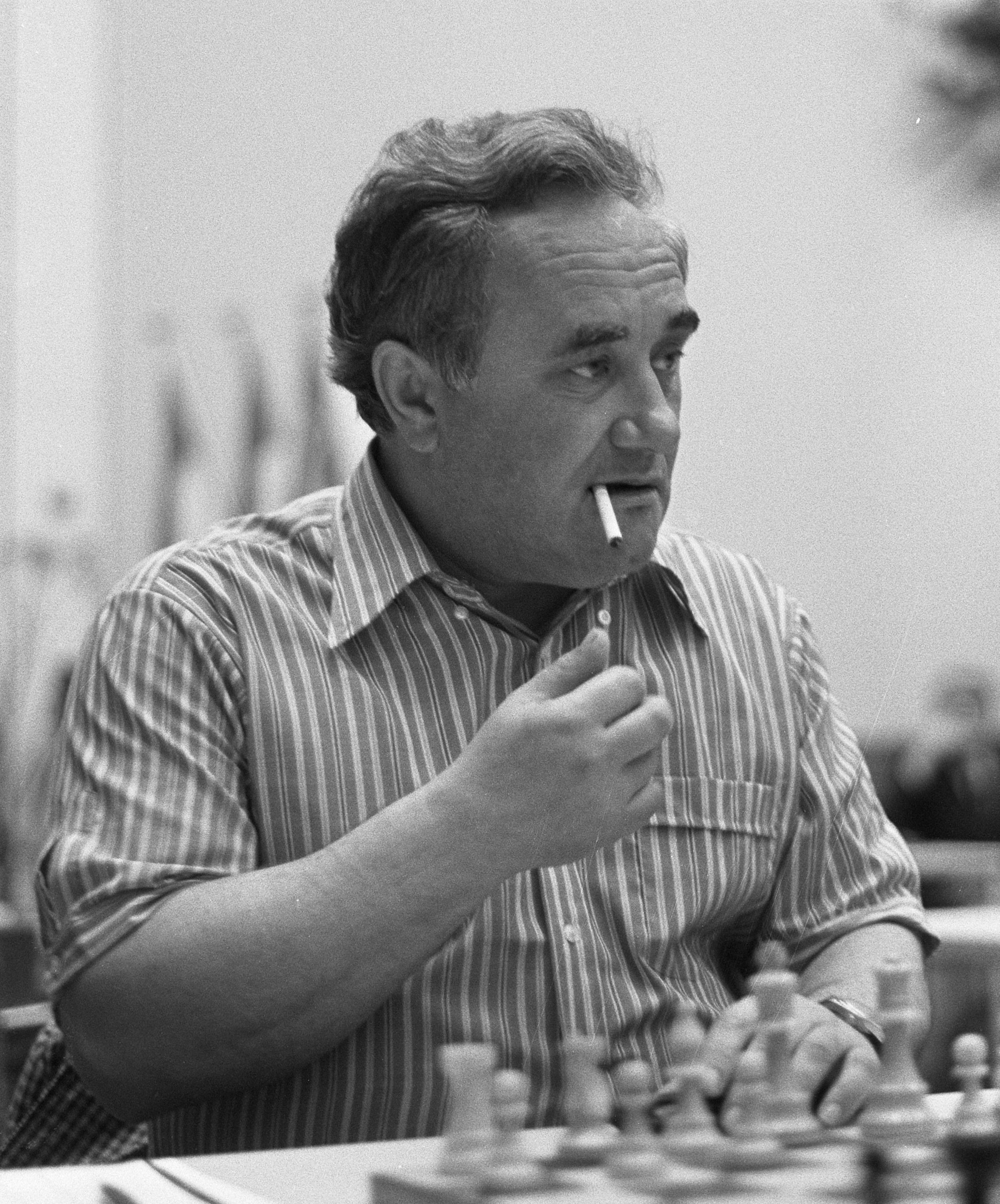
Geller in 1973

Geller began to make his mark in the late 1940s, as he won the USSR Championship semifinal qualifier at Tbilisi 1949 with 11½/16, thus advancing to the final later that year. His finals debut was sensational at URS-ch17 at Moscow; as a virtual unknown he tied for 3rd–4th places with 12½/19, behind only winners David Bronstein and Vasily Smyslov. Geller defeated such established players as Semyon Furman, Isaac Boleslavsky, Alexander Kotov, Salo Flohr, fellow finals debutant Tigran Petrosian, Viacheslav Ragozin, and Grigory Levenfish. Despite this showing, he was obliged to return to the semifinal level the next year, but advanced with a third-place finish in the 1950 qualifier at Kiev with 9/15. At URS-ch18 at Moscow 1950, Geller made 9/17 for a shared 7th–10th place; the winner was Paul Keres. Also in 1950, Geller won the Ukrainian SSR Championship in Kiev, the first of his four titles in that event; he repeated from 1957 to 1959, with all three events in Kiev. Geller in 1950 made his international debut at the Przepiorka Memorial at Iwonicz Zdroj with 11½/19 for seventh place in a powerful field; Keres won again.

Geller is reckoned to have been among the best ten players in the world for around twenty years. He was awarded the International Master title in 1951, and the International Grandmaster title the following year.

Geller played in 23 USSR Chess Championships, a record equalled by Mark Taimanov, achieving good results in many. He won in 1955 at Moscow (URS-ch22) when, despite losing five games, he finished equal first with 12/19, then defeated Smyslov in the playoff match by the score of +1=6. He won his second title in 1979 at Minsk (URS-ch47) at the age of 54, making him the oldest Soviet champion.

Among his best results in other important tournaments were: clear first at Iwonicz Zdroj 1957, equal first with Taimanov at Dresden 1959, equal first with Lajos Portisch at Beverwijk 1965, clear first at Kislovodsk 1966, clear first at Gothenburg 1967, clear first at Kislovodsk 1968, equal first with Mikhail Botvinnik at Wijk aan Zee 1969 (ahead of Keres), equal first at Havana 1971 with Vlastimil Hort, equal first at Hilversum 1973 with Laszlo Szabo, clear first at Budapest 1973 ahead of Anatoly Karpov, clear first at Teesside 1975, clear first at Moscow 1975 (ahead of Boris Spassky, Viktor Korchnoi, and Petrosian), clear first at Las Palmas 1976, equal first with Gennadi Sosonko at Wijk aan Zee 1977, clear first at Bogotá 1978, equal first at Bern 1987 with Daniel Campora, clear first at Dortmund 'A' 1989, and equal first at New York Manhattan 1990 with Gregory Kaidanov, at age 65.

In Seniors' competition, Geller further distinguished himself in the early 1990s. At the World Seniors' Championship, Bad Woerishofen 1991, he tied for first with Smyslov at 8½/11. Then, in the next year's Championship at the same site, Geller claimed clear first with the same score. Geller remained active in high-level competitive chess until age 70; his last event was the 1995 Russian Championship at Elista.

== World title candidate ==
Geller reached the later stages of the World Championship several times. He was a Candidate at Zurich 1953 and Amsterdam 1956.

Geller's best result was in the 1962 cycle, as he finished second to Bobby Fischer at the Stockholm Interzonal. Then in the Candidates', he ended up one-half point short of playing for the title by scoring 17/27 at Curaçao, tying for second place with Keres, half a point behind Tigran Petrosian, who went on to defeat Botvinnik for the title the next year. Geller lost a playoff match to Keres at Moscow 1962 by 4½–3½, but was able to enter the 1965 Candidates' matches as a substitute when Botvinnik (defeated World Champion) declined to take part.

In the 1965 Candidates he defeated Smyslov by 5½–2½ at Moscow in the first round, but lost to Spassky by 5½–2½ at Riga in the semifinals. In a 1966 Copenhagen playoff match against Bent Larsen, the two players split eight games with two wins each, and Larsen won the first tiebreak game to secure Candidates' exemption in case of a withdrawal by a qualified player in the next cycle. (Eventually, this turned out not to matter, since none withdrew.)

In the 1968 cycle, Geller again lost to Spassky, at Sukhumi by 5½–2½, in a Candidates' first-round match. He returned to the interzonal stage in 1970 at Palma de Mallorca, and qualified as a Candidate again, losing his first match to Korchnoi at Moscow by 5½–2½. In 1973, he tied with Lajos Portisch and Lev Polugaevsky for second place at the Petropolis Interzonal, but lost out in the three-way playoff match tournament at Portorož, with two qualifying spots at stake, so he did not advance.

== Team tournaments ==
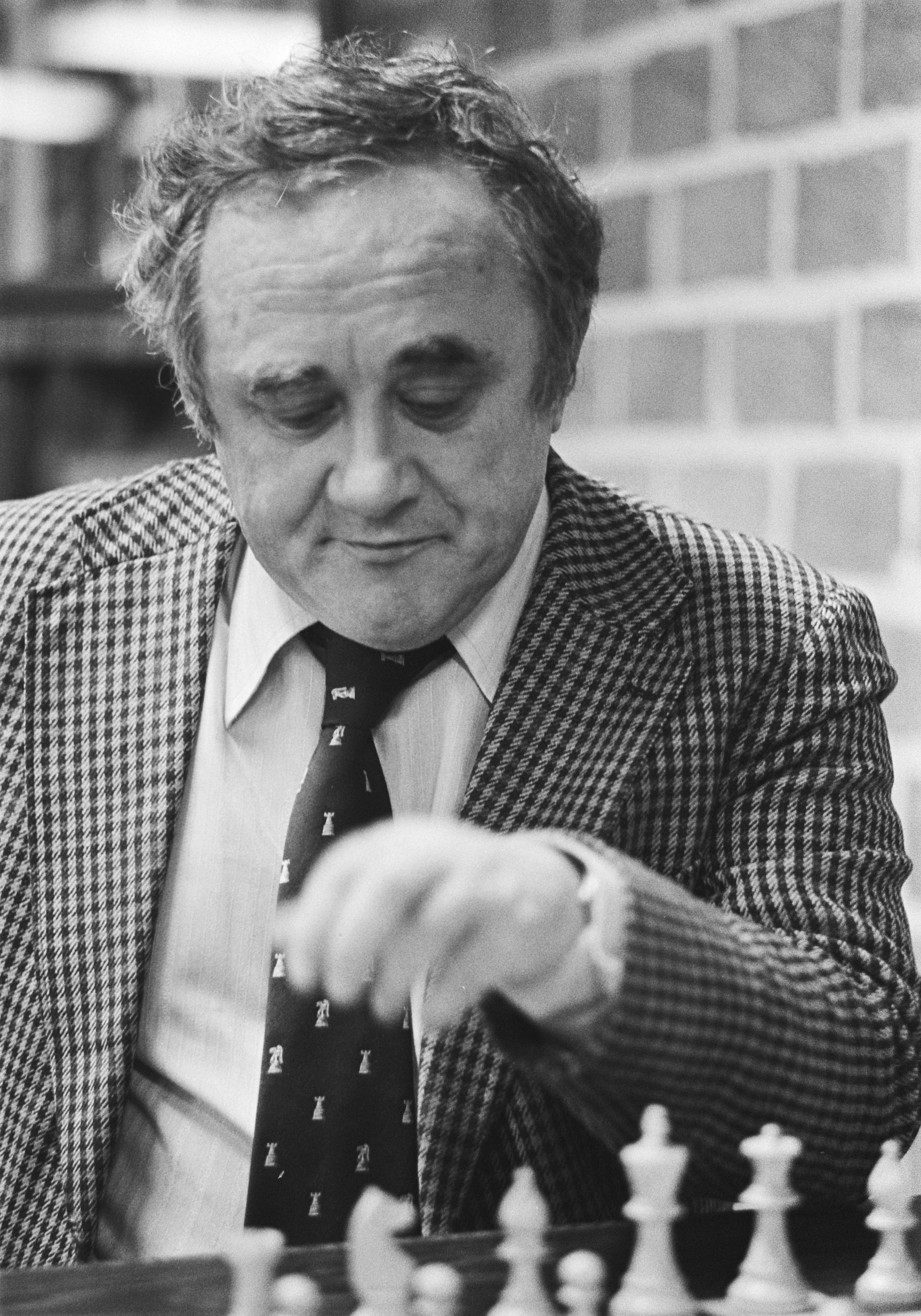
Geller in 1977

Geller represented the USSR seven times in the Chess Olympiad, over a 28-year span from 1952 to 1980, and contributed well each time to the team gold medal victories. He won three gold medals and three silver on his board. His overall score in the Olympiad play is: (+46−7=23), for 75.7 per cent.

- Helsinki 1952, board 4, 10½/14 (+8−1=5), board silver medal;
- Amsterdam 1954, 1st reserve, 5/7 (+4−1=2), board gold medal;
- Moscow 1956, 2nd reserve, 7½/10 (+7−2=1), board gold medal;
- Varna 1962, 1st reserve, 10½/12 (+10−1=1), board gold medal;
- Lugano 1968, board 4, 9½/12 (+7−0=5), board silver medal;
- Siegen 1970, 2nd reserve, 8/12 (+6−2=4);
- Valletta 1980, board 4, 6½/9 (+4−0=5), board silver medal.

Geller was also selected on six occasions for the USSR team to the European Team Championships. His team won gold each time, and he won four gold medals on his board. According to olimpbase.org, his overall score in Euroteams events is: (+17−1=19), for 71.6 per cent.

- Oberhausen 1961, board 7, 6½/9 (+4−0=5), board gold medal;
- Kapfenberg 1970, board 4, 4/6 (+3−1=2), board gold medal;
- Bath, Somerset 1973, board 7, 4½/5 (+4−0=1), board gold medal;
- Moscow 1977, board 6, 4½/7 (+2−0=5), board gold medal;
- Skara 1980, board 5, 4/6 (+2−0=4);
- Plovdiv 1983, 2nd reserve, 3/4 (+2−0=2).

Geller also represented the USSR eleven times in the USSR versus Yugoslavia matches held from the 1950s to the 1970s, more than any other Soviet player.

== Assessment ==
According to Jeff Sonas' Chessmetrics rating system, Geller was ranked No. 2 in the world May–July 1963, and was in the world's top ten for much of the 1950s and 1960s. After FIDE adopted the Elo rating system in 1971, Geller appeared in the top 10 three times: in 1971 (equal 6th, 2630), 1976 (equal 8th, 2620) and 1981 (equal 10th, 2615).

Geller had an overall plus score against four world champions: Mikhail Botvinnik +4−1=7, Vasily Smyslov +11−8=37, Tigran Petrosian +5−3=32, Bobby Fischer +5−3=2. In total, Geller played ten and beat eight world chess champions, and his overall record in games in classical chess against world champions is positive: +39−36=131 (Max Euwe +1−1, Mikhail Botvinnik +4−1=7, Vassily Smyslov +11−8=37, Mikhail Tal +6−6=23, Tigran Petrosian +5−3=32, Boris Spassky +6−10=22, Bobby Fischer +5−3=2, Anatoly Karpov +1−2=5, Garry Kasparov +0−1=2, Viswanathan Anand +0−1=1). Geller did rather badly against Korchnoi (+6−11=16) and Polugaevsky (+4−11=21).

=== Lifetime scores against top grandmasters ===
Note: only official tournament and match games in classical chess are counted here.

Score vs. top grandmasters of his time
Player	Wins	Losses	Draws
Mikhail Botvinnik	4	1	7
David Bronstein	5	5	15
Bobby Fischer	5	3	2
Svetozar Gligoric	4	1	22
Vlastimil Hort	2	1	11
Paul Keres	7	9	21
Viktor Korchnoi	6	11	16
Bent Larsen	3	5	9
Tigran Petrosian	5	3	32
Lev Polugaevsky	4	11	21
Lajos Portisch	4	2	12
Vasily Smyslov	11	8	37
Boris Spassky	6	10	22
Leonid Stein	6	1	7
Mark Taimanov	8	7	12
Mikhail Tal	6	6	23
Total	86	84	269

== Legacy ==
Geller is best remembered today for the tactical ability and original attacking style which characterised the earlier part of his career. In later years he became a more rounded player. He was noted as an openings expert, and was one of the pioneers in developing the King's Indian Defence to prominence, along with fellow Ukrainians Isaac Boleslavsky and David Bronstein. Geller also greatly advanced the knowledge in several variations of the Sicilian Defence, such as the quiet line with 6.Be2 against the Najdorf Variation 1.e4 c5 2.Nf3 d6 3.d4 cxd4 4.Nxd4 Nf6 5.Nc3 a6, which he used to defeat Bobby Fischer. He introduced the sharp Geller Gambit (1.d4 d5 2.c4 c6 3.Nf3 Nf6 4.Nc3 dxc4 5.e4) against the Slav Defence. He acted as second (assistant) to World Champion Boris Spassky in the World Championship match of 1972 against Bobby Fischer, and later seconded World Champion Anatoly Karpov, as well as his lifelong close friend Tigran Petrosian. His books included an autobiography, translated by Bernard Cafferty as Grandmaster Geller at the Chessboard (1969). This was later updated and reissued in 1983 under the title The Application of Chess Theory, and contains 100 well-annotated games. Former champion Botvinnik stated that, in his opinion, Geller was the best player in the world in the late 1960s. Geller seemed to be stronger in tournament play than in matches.

Geller was featured in the 2014 Bobby Fischer biopic Pawn Sacrifice, portrayed by Edward Zinoviev.

== Notable games ==
- Alexander Kotov vs. Geller, USSR Championship, Moscow 1949, King's Indian Defence, Fianchetto Variation (E68), 0–1 Geller makes his debut at the top Soviet event, and makes sure he's noticed with wins like this.
- Tigran Petrosian vs. Geller, USSR Championship, Moscow 1949, King's Indian Defence, Petrosian Variation (E93), 0–1 Petrosian's new system gets a rough ride in one of its first games.
- Geller vs. Alexei Sokolsky, USSR Championship, Moscow 1950, French Defence, Winawer Variation (C18), 1–0 A drastic victory spurred by a new opening idea on White's eighth move.
- Mikhail Botvinnik vs. Geller, Budapest 1952, King's Indian Defence, Fianchetto Variation (E68), 0–1 Geller wins a crucial game over the World Champion.
- Geller vs. Paul Keres, USSR Championship, Tbilisi 1959, Nimzo–Indian Defence, Rubinstein Variation (E45), 1–0 Keres had a big edge in wins over Geller early on, but Geller started to close the gap.
- Geller vs. Bobby Fischer, Curaçao Candidates 1962, Sicilian Defence, Najdorf Variation, Opocensky Variation (B92), 1–0 Rising American star Bobby Fischer gets overrun by Geller's queenside advance.
- Geller vs. Boris Spassky, USSR Spartakiad 1964, Sicilian Defence, Scheveningen Variation (B83), 1–0 Geller had the edge over Spassky in tournament play, but the younger Spassky dominated in their two matches.
- Geller vs. Vasily Smyslov, Candidates' Match, Moscow 1965, game 5, Grunfeld Defence, Exchange Variation (D87), 1–0 A fabulous tactical masterpiece involving repeated Queen sacrifices, exploiting Black's weak back rank.
- Geller vs. Bent Larsen, Playoff Match, Copenhagen 1966, game 2, Sicilian Defence, Richter–Rauzer Variation (B69), 10 Larsen is a tactical wizard who gets outplayed in this encounter.
- Leonid Stein vs. Geller, USSR Team Championship, Moscow 1966, King's Indian Defence, Averbakh Variation (E70), 0–1 Two King's Indian maestros go toe-to-toe, and Geller comes out on top.
- Bobby Fischer vs. Geller, Skopje 1967, Sicilian Defence, Velimirovic Attack (B89), 0–1 During a stretch when Fischer was beating virtually everybody else, Geller was dominating Fischer. Here Fischer miscalculates and is drastically punished.
- Geller vs. David Bronstein, Kislovodsk 1968, Sicilian Defence, de la Bourdonnais Variation (B32), 1–0 Bronstein was another player who dominated Geller at first, but Geller persevered and started winning.
- Geller vs. Viktor Korchnoi, Candidates' Match, Moscow 1971, game 4, Sicilian Defence, Dragon Variation (B78), 1–0 When it came to a theoretical duel, Geller could certainly hold his own with anyone.
- Geller vs. Mikhail Tal, Moscow 1975, Pirc Defence (B08), 1–0 A tactical melee between two attacking geniuses.
- Geller vs. Anatoly Karpov, USSR Championship, Moscow 1976, French Defence, Winawer Variation (C16), 1–0 Geller crosses up World Champion Karpov, whom he was coaching, with a surprise in the opening, to counter Karpov's own unusual defensive choice and finishes him off with a queen sacrifice.

== See also ==
- List of Jewish chess players
