= Dragoljub Minić =

Yugoslav chess grandmaster (1937–2005)

Personal information
- Born: March 5, 1937 Podgorica, Zeta Banovina, Kingdom of Yugoslavia
- Died: April 5, 2005 (aged 68) Novi Sad, Serbia and Montenegro

Chess career
- Country: Yugoslavia
- Title: Grandmaster (1991)
- Peak rating: 2490 (July 1971)
- Peak ranking: No. 83 (July 1971)

Dragoljub Minić (Serbian Cyrillic: Драгољуб Минић; March 5, 1937 – c. April 5, 2005) was a Yugoslav Grandmaster of chess. He won the championship of Yugoslavia in 1962 (joint with Aleksandar Matanović).

== Chess career ==
Minić's chess career was primarily in the 1960s and 1970s. He represented Yugoslavia in many competitions, including the 1962 Varna Olympiad, where he scored 6½ out of 8 games for Yugoslavia, which finished second to the Soviet Union, and the 1970 Siegen Olympiad, where he scored 8½ out of 10 for Yugoslavia, which finished third behind the Soviet Union and Hungary. Minić also served as a second to Svetozar Gligorić and Ljubomir Ljubojević, Yugoslavia's most prominent grandmasters.

Minić was famous for his knowledge of the game and great analytical ability. FIDE awarded him the International Master title in 1964. Despite being grandmaster-strength for many years, Minic could not fulfil all of the requirements for the GM title. However, Fide awarded him an Honorary Grandmaster title in 1991.

== Death ==
Minić was found dead by friends in his Novi Sad apartment on April 9, 2005, after failing to respond to phone and intercom calls for several days. Doctors determined that he died of a heart attack approximately four days earlier.

== Notable games ==
Minić was a virtuoso of the Sicilian Defence, which he played with skill from either side of the board. Here is a sharp tactical win over Yugoslav grandmaster Albin Planinc at the Vidmar Memorial tournament in 1973.

Planinc vs. Minić, Ljubljana 1973

Position: h1 white rook, a1 black rook, h2 white pawn, c2 white pawn, b2 white pawn, f3 black queen, d4 white rook, b4 white king, g5 white bishop, e5 white pawn, f6 black knight, d6 white knight, h7 black pawn, g7 black pawn, e7 white queen, d7 black knight, c7 black king, b7 black bishop, h8 black rook

Position after 22.Kb4

Planinc vs. Minić
1.e4 c5 2.Nf3 d6 3.d4 cxd4 4.Nxd4 Nf6 5.Nc3 a6 6.Bg5 e6 7.f4 Nbd7 8.Qf3 Qc7 9.0-0-0 b5 10.e5 Bb7 11.Qh3 dxe5 12.Nxe6 fxe6 13.Qxe6+ Be7 14.Bxb5 axb5 15.Nxb5 Qc6 16.Nd6+ Kd8 17.fxe5 Kc7 18.Qxe7 Rxa2 19.Rd4 Ra1+ 20.Kd2 Qxg2+ 21.Kc3 Qf3+ 22.Kb4 (diagram) Ra4+!!

An amazing move, giving up the rook just to gain a tempo for the attack. The game continued:

23.Kxa4 Bc6+ 24.Kb4 Rb8+ 25.Kc4 Nd5 26.Ne8+ Rxe8 27.Qd6+ Kb7 28.Rxd5 Qxh1 29.Ra5 Qe4+ 30.Kb3 Rxe5 31.Bd8 Qf3+ 32.c3 Qf7+ 33.c4 Re3+ 34.Kb4 Qf8 35.Qxf8 Nxf8 36.Rf5 Rf3 37.Rh5 Ne6 38.Be7 h6 39.Bd6 Rd3 40.Be5 Re3 41.Bg3 Be8 42.Ra5 Re2 43.b3 g5 44.Rf5 h5 45.c5 Re4+ 46.Kc3 Kc6 47.Bd6 Re3+ 48.Kc4 Rxb3 49.Re5 Rf3 50.Kb4 Bd7 51.Re2 Nd4 52.Ra2 Kd5 53.Ka5 Rb3 54.Rd2 Kc4 0–1
