= Lev Polugaevsky =

Soviet chess grandmaster (1934–1995)

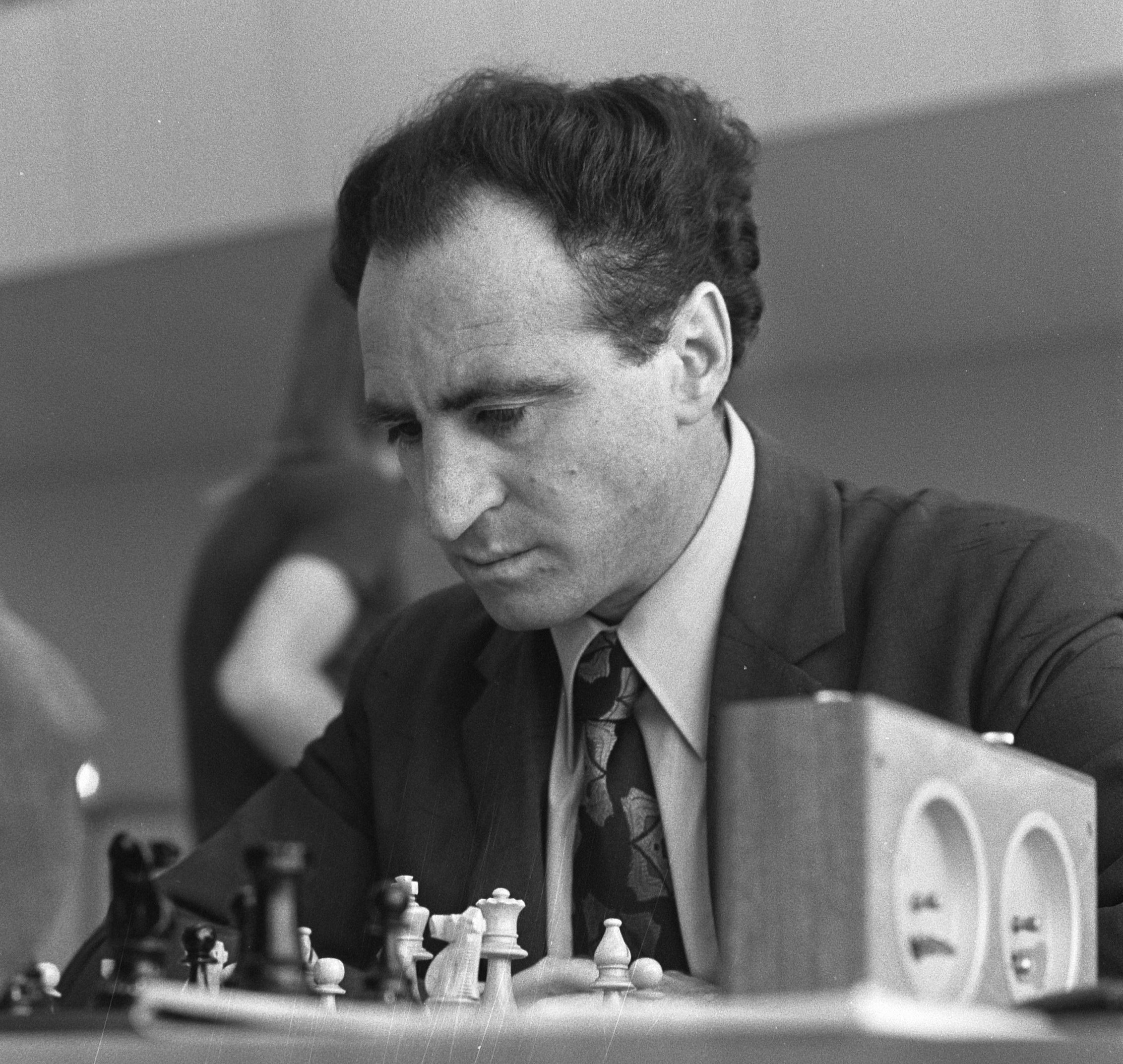
- Polugaevsky in 1972

Personal information
- Born: Lev Abramovich Polugaevsky; 20 November 1934 Mogilev, Byelorussian SSR, Soviet Union
- Died: 30 August 1995 (aged 60) Paris, France

Chess career
- Country: Soviet Union → Russia
- Title: Grandmaster (1962)
- Peak rating: 2645 (July 1972)
- Peak ranking: No. 3 (July 1972)

Lev Abramovich Polugaevsky (Russian: Лев Абрамович Полугаевский, IPA: [pəlʊɡɐˈjefskʲɪj]; 20 November 1934 – 30 August 1995) was a Soviet chess player. He was awarded the title of International Grandmaster by FIDE in 1962 and was a frequent contender for the World Championship, although he never achieved that title. He was one of the strongest players in the world from the early 1960s until the late 1980s, as well as a distinguished author and opening theorist whose contributions in this field remain important to the present day.

== Career ==
Polugaevsky was born in Mogilev, in the Soviet Union (now Mahilyow, Belarus), to a Jewish family, and, after being evacuated during the Second World War, grew up in Kuybyshev (modern Samara). He began playing chess around the age of 10. In 1948, he attracted the attention of Candidate Master Alexy Ivashin, who became his first teacher. International Master Lev Aronin, who lived in Moscow but had family in Kuybyshev, eventually became the teacher whom Polugaevsky credited most for his development. Additionally, between 1950 and 1953 he trained with Rashid Nezhmetdinov. Unlike many of his grandmaster colleagues, his development in chess came slowly, and he did not receive the Soviet master title until he was an adult. His progress then accelerated rapidly, however, and by the late 1960s he was one of the world's strongest players, as was recognized by his participation in the famous "USSR vs. Rest of the World" match of 1970. In this match he occupied fourth board, losing one game to Vlastimil Hort and drawing his other three. Until 1973, Polugaevsky did not pursue chess as a career, working as an engineer and taking time off for tournaments.

Polugaevsky won at Mar del Plata in 1962 and 1971. He won or tied in the USSR Chess Championship three times. He played regularly in qualifying events to select a challenger for the world championship, qualifying for the Candidates Tournament on three occasions. His greatest advancement toward the title came during the 1977 and 1980 cycles, when he defeated Henrique Mecking and former world champion Mikhail Tal, respectively, in quarterfinal Candidates matches, before succumbing both times in the semifinals to the eventual challenger, Viktor Korchnoi.

Polugaevsky played on the Soviet national team in seven Chess Olympiads, in 1966, 1968, 1970, 1978, 1980, 1982 and 1984. His team won the gold medal on each occasion, except in 1978, when the USSR finished second to Hungary.

== Author ==
Polugaevsky was a chess author. His 1977 book Grandmaster Preparation (now out of print) is a book that contains notable insights into his own thinking as he crafted the eponymous variation in the main line Najdorf Sicilian Defence (6.Bg5 e6 7.f4 b5). He went about his writing with the same meticulous care as characterized his analyses, and was contemptuous of the many less thorough authors who sought to profit from the post-Fischer chess boom with shoddy work, memorably commenting that "Ninety per cent of all chess books you can open at page one and then immediately close again for ever. Sometimes you see books that have been written in one month. I don't like that. You should take at least two years for a book, or not do it [at] all."

== Books by Polugaevsky ==
- Queen's Gambit: Orthodox Defence
- Grandmaster Preparation, ISBN 0-08-024098-4
- Grandmaster Performance, ISBN 0-08-029749-8
- Grandmaster Achievement
- Art of Defence in Chess
- The Sicilian Labyrinth
- Sicilian Love – Lev Polugaevsky Chess Tournament 1994 (Buenos Aires), with Jeroen Piket, the New in Chess Editorial team, 1995, 240 p., ISBN 90-71689-99-9

== Death ==
To celebrate Polugaevsky's 60th birthday, a Sicilian Defence-themed tournament was held in recognition of his contributions to the opening. The event was funded by Luis Rentero and took place in Buenos Aires in October 1994. Polugaevsky was too ill to participate but attended as a guest of honour. He died of a brain tumour on August 30, 1995.

== Legacy ==
Polugaevsky was a noted theorist whose work on a number of openings has stood the test of time. He is best remembered for a variation of the Sicilian Defence that bears his name: 1.e4 c5 2.Nf3 d6 3.d4 cxd4 4.Nxd4 Nf6 5.Nc3 a6 6.Bg5 e6 7.f4 b5!? This Polugaevsky Variation of the Najdorf Sicilian leads to extraordinarily complicated tactical play on which the last word has still not been said, although theory as of 2005 seems to give White the upper hand.

== Illustrative games ==
This game against Tal, from the 1969 Soviet championship, would seem at first glance to be an example of Polugaevsky beating "The Magician from Riga" at his own sacrificial game. More subtly, however, it also reveals the depth of his opening knowledge and preparation. Polugaevsky had worked with Boris Spassky as the latter was preparing for his successful 1969 world championship match with Tigran Petrosian, and the two had made a searching analysis of the opening used in this game. Polugaevsky remarked later that the position as late as move 25 had appeared on the board during his analysis on the morning of the game.

Position: d8 black queen, f8 black rook, g8 black king, a7 black pawn, b7 black bishop, f7 white knight, g7 black pawn, b6 black pawn, e6 white pawn, d5 black pawn, f5 white queen, h5 white pawn, c4 black rook, a2 white pawn, b2 black knight, f2 white pawn, g2 white pawn, d1 white rook, e1 white rook, g1 white king

Position after 25.e6!!
Polugaevsky vs. Tal; Moscow 1969, Semi-Tarrasch Defence
1.c4 Nf6 2.Nc3 e6 3.Nf3 d5 4.d4 c5 5.cxd5 Nxd5 6.e4 Nxc3 7.bxc3 cxd4 8.cxd4 Bb4+ 9.Bd2 Bxd2+ 10.Qxd2 0-0 11.Bc4 Nc6 12.0-0 b6 13.Rad1 Bb7 14.Rfe1 Na5 15.Bd3 Rc8 16.d5 exd5 17.e5 Nc4 18.Qf4 Nb2 19.Bxh7+ Kxh7 20.Ng5+ Kg6 21.h4 Rc4 22.h5+ Kh6 23.Nxf7+ Kh7 24.Qf5+ Kg8 25.e6 (diagram) Qf6 26.Qxf6 gxf6 27.Rd2 Rc6 28.Rxb2 Re8 29.Nh6+ Kh7 30.Nf5 Rexe6 31.Rxe6 Rxe6 32.Rc2 Rc6 33.Re2 Bc8 34.Re7+ Kh8 35.Nh4 f5 36.Ng6+ Kg8 37.Rxa7 1–0

== See also ==
- List of Jewish chess players
