= Bibliography of Bobby Fischer =

List of works about the American chess champion

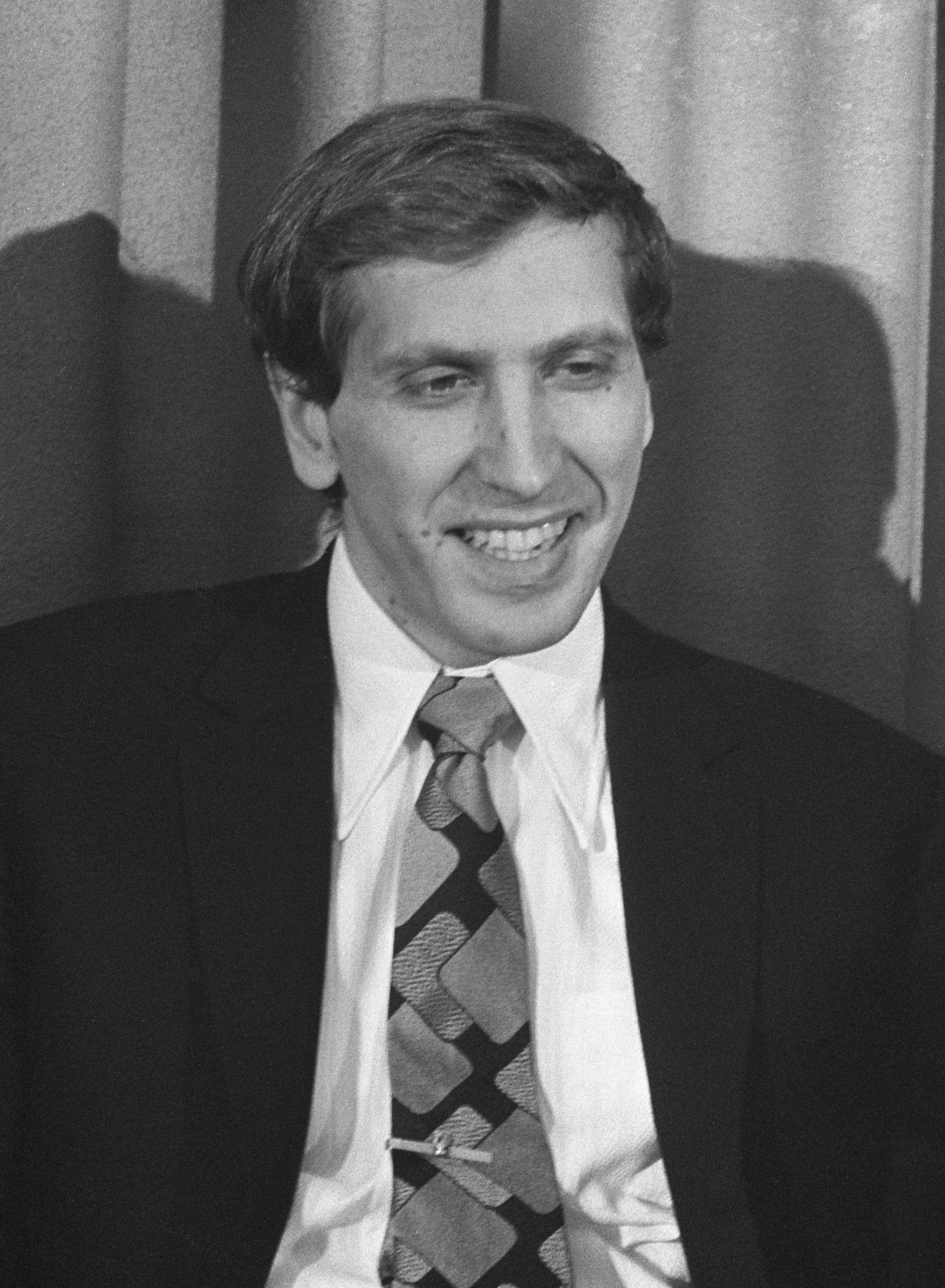
Bobby Fischer

Many books, films and other works about Bobby Fischer have been created. Bobby Fischer (March 9, 1943 – January 17, 2008) was an American chess prodigy who rose to prominence during the 1950s and 1960s. In 1972, Fischer defeated the Soviet player Boris Spassky to become world champion. Soviet players had dominated chess for several years before Fischer's championship, a trend which continued after 1975 when Fischer refused to defend his title. Fischer's participation in the 1972 championship match increased American interest in chess, in the context of the Cold War.

Works about Fischer divide into several genres. In chess literature, several books have analyzed important games of his career, such as the Game of the Century, an early brilliancy won by Fischer when he was 13 years old. In the immediate aftermath of Fischer's 1972 championship, several books appeared which were exclusively devoted to analysis of the match's 21 games. Fischer's own work includes My 60 Memorable Games, a well-regarded analysis of his own games, and (with co-authors) Bobby Fischer Teaches Chess, a popular primer intended for absolute beginners.

Fischer has been the subject of several biographies, with some focusing on his psychology. Fischer was known as an eccentric and "difficult" person, a reputation which informed the biographies and film accounts of his life. The film Pawn Sacrifice dramatized Fischer's life and performance in the 1972 championship, depicting him using the archetype of the tortured genius.

== Books ==
The bibliography is given in APA style.

A

- Agur, Elie. (1992). Bobby Fischer: His Approach to Chess. Cadogan Chess. ISBN 1857440013.
- Alban, Albert. (2015). Chess tactics for beginners from the games of Bobby Fischer. Amazon Digital Services LLC.
- Alburt, Lev. (2003). Three Days With Bobby Fischer and Other Chess Essays: How to Meet Champions & Choose Your Openings. ISBN 1889323098.
- Alexander, C.H.O'D. (1972). Fischer v. Spassky. Vintage Books. ISBN 0394718305.

B

- Benson, Harry. (2011). Bobby Fischer. powerHouse Books. ISBN 1576875814.
- Bernstein, Jeremy. (2012). Mostly He Won: Kubrick, Bobby Fischer, and the Attractions of Chess. Amazon Digital Services LLC.
- Bohm, Hans and Jongkind, Kees. (2005). Bobby Fischer: The Wandering King. Batsford. ISBN 0713489359.
- Brady, Frank. (1989). Bobby Fischer: Profile of a Prodigy. Dover Publications. ISBN 9780486259253.
- Brady, Frank. (2012). Endgame: Bobby Fischer's Remarkable Rise and Fall. Broadway Books. ISBN 1780336926.
- Burger, Robert E. (2011). The Chess of Bobby Fischer. Ishi Press reprint. ISBN 4871874559.
- Byrne, Robert and Nei, Iivo. (2013). Both Sides of the Chessboard: An Analysis of the Fischer/Spassky Chess Match. Ishi Press reprint. ISBN 9784871875370.

D

- Darrach, Brad. (1974). Bobby Fischer Vs the Rest of the World. Stein & Day Pub. ISBN 0812816188.
- Dautov, Petra. (2024). The Real Bobby Fischer: A Year with the Chess Genius. Russell Enterprises. ISBN 1949859975, 978-1949859973
- Davies, Nigel. (1992). Bobby Fischer: The Five Million Dollar Comeback. Everyman Chess. ISBN 978-1857440423.
- Denker, Arnold. (2009). The Bobby Fischer I Knew and Other Stories. Ishi Press reprint. ISBN 0923891439.
- Donaldson, John. (2020). Bobby Fischer and His World. Silman-James Press, Inc. ISBN 9781890085193.
- Donaldson, John and Tangborn, Eric. (2017). Bobby Fischer: The Early Years: 1943 - 1962. Amazon Digital Services LLC.
- Donaldson, John and Tangborn, Eric. (2017). Collected Annotations and Articles by Bobby Fischer. Amazon Digital Services LLC.
- Donaldson, John. (2005). A Legend on the Road: Bobby Fischer's 1964 Simultaneous Exhibition Tour. Russell Enterprises. ISBN 1888690259.
- Donaldson, John and Tangborn, Eric. (1999). The Unknown Bobby Fischer. International Chess Enterprises. ISBN 9781879479852.

E

- Edmonds, David and Eidinow, John . (2004). Bobby Fischer Goes to War: How the Soviets Lost the Most Extraordinary Chess Match of All Time. HarperCollins Publishers. ISBN 0060510242.
- Euwe, Max. (2011). Bobby Fischer – The Greatest?. Ishi Press reprint. ISBN 4871874702.
- Euwe, Max. (1977). Bobby Fischer and His Predecessors in the World Chess Championship. HarperCollins Publishers. ISBN 9780713519556.
- Euwe, Max and Timman, Jan. (2009). Fischer World Champion: The Acclaimed Classic About the 1972 Fischer-Spassky Match. New In Chess. ISBN 9056912631.
- Evans, Larry and Smith, Ken. (1973). Chess World Championship 1972: Fischer vs. Spassky. Simon & Schuster. ISBN 9780671215477.

F

- Fine, Reuben. (2008). Bobby Fischer's Conquest of the World Chess Championship: The Psychology and Tactics of the Title Match. Ishi Press reprint. ISBN 0923891471.
- Fischer, Bobby. (2016). Checkmate: Bobby Fischer's Boys' Life Columns. Russell Enterprises, Inc. ISBN 978-1941270516
- Fischer, Bobby. (2008 reprint). Bobby Fischer's Games of Chess. Ishi Press. ISBN 978-0923891466.
- Fischer, Bobby, et al. (1966). Bobby Fischer Teaches Chess. Basic Systems, Inc. New York City. ISBN 978-0553130539
- Fischer, Bobby. (1969). My 60 Memorable Games. Simon & Schuster. New York City. ISBN 0671214837.

G

- Geuzendam, Ten and Jan, Dirk. (2015). Finding Bobby Fischer. New In Chess. ISBN 978-9056915728
- Gligorić, Svetozar. (1973). Fischer vs. Spassky: Chess Match of the Century. Simon & Schuster. ISBN 9780671213978.
- Gufeld, Eduard. (2001). Bobby Fischer: From Chess Genius to Legend. Thinkers' Press. ISBN 093865084X.

H

- Hays, Lou. (1995). Bobby Fischer: Complete Games of the American World Chess Champion. Hays Pub. ISBN 1880673991.

K

- Kasparov, Garry et al. (2005). Garry Kasparov on Fischer: Garry Kasparov On My Great Predecessors, Part 4. Everyman Chess. ISBN 978-1857443950.
- Keene, Raymond (1992). Fischer–Spassky II - The Return of a Legend. B.T. Batsford Ltd. ISBN 0-7134-7363-0
- Khmelnitsky, Igor. (2009). Chess Exam: You vs. Bobby Fischer: Matches Against Chess Legends: Play the Match, Rate Yourself, Improve Your Game!. Chess Exams. ISBN 9780975476109.

L

- Lakdawala, Cyrus. (2016). Fischer: Move by Move. Everyman Chess. ISBN 9781781942727.

M

- Mednis, Edmar. (1974). How to Beat Bobby Fischer. Random House. ISBN 0812904699.
- Müller, Karsten. (2010). Bobby Fischer: The Career and Complete Games of the American World Chess Champion. Russell Enterprises Inc. ISBN 1888690682.

O

- Olafsson, Helgi. (2012). Bobby Fischer Comes Home: The Final Years in Iceland, a Saga of Friendship and Lost Illusions. New In Chess. ISBN 9789056913816.

P

- Pandolfini, Bruce. (1985). Bobby Fischer's Outrageous Chess Moves. Simon & Schuster. ISBN 0671606093.
- Peters, Jack (1992). Bobby Fischer vs Boris Spassky: The 1992 Rematch The Background. The Moves. The Strategy. Los Angeles Times. ASIN B003YEL7WO.
- Plisetsky, Dmitry and Voronkov, Sergey. (2005). Russians v Fischer. Everyman Chess. ISBN 978-1857443806
- Ponterotto, Joseph G. (2012). A Psychobiography of Bobby Fischer: Understanding the Genius, Mystery, and Psychological Decline of a World Chess Champion. Charles C Thomas Pub Ltd. ISBN 9780398087401.
- Powell, Paul. (2013). Bobby Fischer 60 More Memorable Games. CreateSpace Independent Publishing Platform. ISBN 9781492732716.

R

- Roberts, Richard. (1973). Fischer/Spassky: The New York Times Report on the Chess Match of the Century. Times Books. ISBN 9780812903027.

S

- Sanchez, Miguel et al. (2020). Fischer in Cuba: Vol I. The Bowker Team. ISBN 978-0578605753
- Sanchez, Miguel et al. (2020). Fischer in Cuba: Vol II. Obispos. ISBN 978-0578645100
- Schiller, Robert. (2009). Learn from Bobby Fischer's Greatest Games. Cardoza. ISBN 1580422357.
- Seirawan, Yasser with Stefanovic, George. (1992). No Regrets: Fischer–Spassky 1992. International Chess Enterprises. ISBN 1879479095.
- Shamkovich, Leonid et al. (1993). Fischer–Spassky 1992 - World Chess Championship Rematch. Hays Publishing. ISBN 1-880673-90-8
- Soltis, Andrew. (2003). Bobby Fischer Rediscovered. Batsford. ISBN 0713488468.
- Stankovic, Nenad. (2012). The Greatest Secret of Bobby Fischer. CreateSpace Independent Publishing Platform. ISBN 1481252232.
- Steiner, George. (1974). Fields of Force: Fischer and Spassky at Reykjavik. Viking Press. ISBN 9780670311781, 0670311782

T

- Taimanov, Mark. (2021). I was a Victim of Bobby Fischer. Quality Chess. ISBN 978-1784831608
- Timman, Jan. (2021). The Unstoppable American: Bobby Fischer’s Road to Reykjavik. New In Chess. ISBN 978-9056919788
- Tsvetkov, Lyudmil. (2021). Bobby Fischer for Buffs. Independently published. ISBN 979-8775432829, 979-8775381462

V

- Verwer, Renzo. (2010). Bobby Fischer for Beginners: Most Famous Chess Player Explained. New in Chess. ISBN 978-9056913151.

W

- Wade, Robert Graham and O'Connell, Kevin. (2009). The Complete Games of Bobby Fischer. Ishi Press. ISBN 0923891374.

== Articles ==
- Nicholas, Peter and Benson, Clea. (2003). Life is not a board game. The Philadelphia Inquirer.
- (2019). American Chess Magazine #12: Bobby Fischer Legend Lives On. pays tribute to the 50th anniversary of My 60 Memorable Games.
- Norman, Brendan. (2014). Bobby Fischer: Beautiful Chess Games, Weird Stuff and Cool Articles.

== Documentaries ==
- Bio. Bobby Fischer, Biography.
- Chapa, Damian (Director). (2009). Bobby Fischer Live. Biography - Drama. United States: Amadeus Pictures.
- Garbus, Liz (Director). (2011). Bobby Fischer Against the World, Biography. United States: HBO Documentary Films.
- Gudmundsson, Fridrik (Director). (2009). Me and Bobby Fischer, Biography. Iceland.
- Moss, Todd (Writer). (2004). Bobby Fischer. Biography. United States: Actuality Productions.
- Zwick, Edward. (2015). Pawn Sacrifice. Biography - Drama. United States: Gail Katz Productions.
