= My 60 Memorable Games =

Book by chess player Bobby Fischer

- 1969 Simon & Schuster edition
- Author: Bobby Fischer
- Language: English
- Subject: Chess
- Genre: Non-fiction
- Publisher: Simon & Schuster
- Publication date: 1969
- Publication place: United States

My 60 Memorable Games is a chess book by Bobby Fischer, first published in 1969. It is a collection of his games dating from the 1957 New Jersey Open to the 1967 Sousse Interzonal. Unlike many players' anthologies, which are often titled My Best Games and include only wins or draws, My 60 Memorable Games includes nine draws and three losses. It has been described as a "classic of objective and painstaking analysis" and is regarded as one of the great pieces of chess literature.

The book was originally published in descriptive notation. An algebraic notation version in 1995 caused some controversy in the chess world because of the many other changes made to the text, with Fischer himself denouncing the edition. In 2008, a reissue of Fischer's original text was published, the only changes being the updating to algebraic notation and the correcting of typographical errors, notation mistakes, and the erroneous last few moves of game 17.

== Writing ==
The book had been planned for some time to be published by Simon & Schuster. Its first title was to be Bobby Fischer's Best Games of Chess. Fischer first announced it would appear "after my match with Botvinnik" (then World Champion), an event first suggested for 1962 and again in the mid 1960s, but which never took place. Fischer then added more games, and retitled it My Memorable Games – 52 Tournament Games. (At one time it was also titled My Life in Chess: 52 Memorable Games.) At that point the collection ended at the Piatigorsky Cup in 1966; however, Fischer then had an abrupt change of heart and decided not to publish the book at all, and asked to be released from his contract. It was suggested that he did not want to reveal all his secrets, as the book has lengthy annotations and analysis of different possible variations of his games.

In 1968, he changed his mind and decided to go ahead with publication. His friend and colleague Grandmaster (GM) Larry Evans, who helped in an editorial capacity and also wrote introductions to all the games, has said this was because Fischer felt philosophically that "the world was coming to an end anyway" (he thought that the Rapture was coming soon) and he might as well make some money. Fischer continued to revise the manuscript and added eight more games, also changing the title to My Memorable Games – 60 Tournament Struggles before settling on the final name.

== Games ==
The collection begins in 1957, omitting the famous "Game of the Century" against Donald Byrne in 1956 (this game had been included in a small, lightly annotated work called Bobby Fischer's Games of Chess, published in 1959). The three losses are to Tal at the Candidates Tournament 1959, Spassky at Mar del Plata 1960, and Geller at Skopje 1967. Among the draws is his only encounter with World Champion Mikhail Botvinnik, at the 1962 Varna Olympiad. This game contains the longest piece of analysis in the book, with Fischer concluding that he missed a win in the endgame. Botvinnik later disputed this, with a refutation from one of his chess school pupils, 13-year-old Garry Kasparov. Among the wins are his first defeat of a Soviet grandmaster, Paul Keres at Zurich 1959, and his 21-move victory as Black over Robert Byrne at the 1963/64 US Championship. There are seven games from his first Candidates tournament in 1959, but only two from his second at Curaçao 1962. All the games were played under tournament conditions except for a friendly game at the home of Reuben Fine in 1963 and a win from Fischer's 1964 simultaneous exhibition tour of the US.

Fischer makes several atmospheric observations about his opponents' habits and reactions to his moves. In game 1, he writes that "Sherwin slid the Rook here with his pinky, as if to emphasize the cunning of this mysterious move." In game 12 versus Gligorić he recalls that "Petrosian and Tal both happened to stroll by the board at this instant. Petrosian made a wry face which looked to me like 'Can Black do this and live?'." From game 37: "Poker-faced, as always, Keres made this move as though it were the most natural one on the board." From the game versus Botvinnik: "I could see by the glint in his eye that he had come well armed for my King's Indian."

He frequently gives his very opinionated views on the opening, mentioning that he had "never opened with the QP [1.d4]—on principle" and that 1.e4 is "Best by test."

== Reception ==
My 60 Memorable Games was enthusiastically received by the chess community and was an immediate success. A review in British Chess Magazine in December 1969 called it "a great book without a doubt, and [it] can go straight on the shelf alongside Alekhine and Tarrasch and fear no comparisons." Upon its reissue in 1995, the same magazine suggested that it could be the best chess book ever written. Fischer was praised for his honesty and the depth and accuracy of his annotations. The book has had a great influence on today's top players. Peter Biyiasas became an International Master by studying only two books: Rook Endings by Levenfish and Smyslov (see Chess endgame literature § Rook endings), and My 60 Memorable Games. It was also GM Bu Xiangzhi's first chess book: he described the games as "fantastic".

== Unauthorized Russian version ==
A Russian edition of the book appeared in 1972, without Fischer's permission and without regard for copyright laws, a standard Soviet practice at the time. The translator had trouble with some of Fischer's American colloquialisms and also omitted several statements that were felt to be anti-Soviet. The edition included a supplementary article assessing Fischer's playing style, written by GM Alexey Suetin, and a short biographical article, written by grandmaster (and former world champion) Vasily Smyslov. At the second of nine press conferences at the 1992 rematch with Boris Spassky, Fischer said that Physical Culture and Sport reported in the book that 50,000 copies had been printed. He said he hadn't received any royalties, "not a penny". He answered speculation about a match with the then World Champion Garry Kasparov by saying nothing could take place until the Russian authorities had paid him all the royalties he felt he was owed. In 1995, Fischer accepted payment of $100,000 from Kirsan Ilyumzhinov, the (then) newly elected president of FIDE, as financial settlement. This edition was one of Kasparov's first chess books, which he described as "one of my earliest and most treasured chess possessions" and "a great influence on my chess".

== Batsford controversy ==
British publisher Batsford released a new edition of My 60 Memorable Games in 1995. Chess writer and GM John Nunn converted the original descriptive chess notation to modern algebraic notation using a computer program. At a press conference in Buenos Aires in June 1996, Fischer denounced the new edition, accusing Batsford of "changing everything in my book, the notation, the format, the pages, the analysis ... and without paying royalties." Batsford responded that they had purchased the rights to the book legally from Faber and Faber, and pointed out that they had corrected many of the ambiguities in the descriptive notation of the moves. However, it emerged that they had added faulty analysis to one game, incorrectly believing Fischer had overlooked a mate in four moves.

Chess historian Edward Winter discovered that there had also been over 570 textual changes. He wrote in CHESS magazine that "... entire notes of Fischer’s had been omitted, individual words had been deleted, other words had been added", and "Fischer's wording had simply been changed without justification." GM Hans Ree stated that "[i]n the Netherlands such changes constitute a criminal offense that could theoretically lead to a prison sentence. ... Fischer had been quite right in his anger." This edition is now out of print, and in 2008, Batsford reissued the book using Fischer's original words. Batsford claimed that the only change made was the conversion to algebraic notation, although a review of the 2008 edition found that several typographical errors and notation mistakes were also corrected.

== My 61 Memorable Games hoax ==
In December 2007, copies of an apparently updated edition entitled My 61 Memorable Games appeared for sale on eBay. It contained a new foreword supposedly written by Fischer, but his involvement was unclear, and eBay soon stepped in to end the auction.

The book is a hoax. Gardar Sverrisson and Einar Einarsson, who were very close to Fischer during his final days in Iceland, state that My 61 Memorable Games "is neither his work nor done with his approval". While Larry Evans originally thought it might have been a pirated version of a genuine Fischer manuscript, he later concluded it was a hoax. In 2012 Edward Winter acquired a copy of the book and presented several pages and other documentary information in his article My 61 Memorable Games (Bobby Fischer).

== Editions ==
2008 reissue

- The original hardback US edition was published in January 1969 by Simon & Schuster, 384 pages. Several paperback reprints were published. Now out of print.
- A UK paperback edition was published April 4, 1972 by Faber and Faber, ISBN 0-571-09987-4. Now out of print.
- The widely criticized Batsford algebraic edition (see above), 240 pages, ISBN 0-7134-7812-8, ISBN 978-0-7134-7812-9. It was released as part of their Algebraic Classics series on 5 February 1995 and is now out of print.
- A reissued edition was published by Batsford in 2008 in paperback, 384 pages, ISBN 978-1-906388-30-0. The text of this edition is the same as the original edition except for the conversion to algebraic notation and the correction of several typographical errors and notation mistakes. The layout is very similar to the original. The text is copyrighted by Fischer, dated 1969, 1972, 1995, and 2008.

== Translations ==
- Armenian: Իմ արժանահիշատակ 60 պարտիաները, Hayastan, 1989. ISBN 554000227X
- Chinese: 棋坛怪杰60局, translated by Lin Feng, 1993. ISBN 978-7805148823
- French: Mes 60 Meilleures Parties, Stock, 1972, revised Editions Editéchecs, 1998. ISBN 978-2950858702
- German: Meine 60 denkwürdigen Partien, Verlag das Schacharchiv, 2008. ISBN 978-3880860445
- Greek: Οι 60 αξέχαστες παρτίδες μου, Aposperitēs, 1985. ISBN 978-9602820650
- Italian: 60 Partite da Ricordare, Mursia, 2015. ISBN 978-8842538585
- Japanese: ボビー・フィッシャー魂の60局, translated by Yu Mizuno, 2011. ISBN 978-4828205540
- Russian: мои 60 памятных партий, the original Russian version, translated by L. Khariton, 1972 (unauthorized, see above)
  - reprinted 2006, Russian Chess House. ISBN 978-5946931731
- Spanish: Mis 60 Mejores Partidas, Editorial Fundamentos, 2009. ISBN 978-8424504700
- Persian: ۶۰ بازی به یاد ماندنی من, translated by Taher Seylsopour, 2008. ISBN 978-9646256996

== See also ==
- List of books and documentaries by or about Bobby Fischer
