= Paul G. Marshall =

American entertainment attorney

- Born: November 19, 1928; New York City, U.S.
- Died: May 10, 2012 (aged 83); Aventura, Florida, U.S.
- Education: Horace Mann School; University of Wisconsin–Madison; Fordham University School of Law
- Occupation: Entertainment lawyer
- Years active: 1965–2012
- Spouse: Bette (Lieb) Marshall
- Children: 3

Paul G. Marshall (November 19, 1928 – May 10, 2012 ) was an American entertainment lawyer who brokered several of the music industry's most definitive contracts and corporate transactions over a 50-year career. Based in New York City, he was best known as a senior partner in prominent entertainment firms and for his representation of major record labels, media conglomerates, and performing artists.

As EMI's legal representative in 1963, Marshall placed the Beatles’ first three records with Vee-Jay Records for United States distribution, after EMI’s U.S. label Capitol refused to release them.

Marshall also served as counsel to major international events, including Woodstock (1969) and the 1972 World Chess Championship between Bobby Fischer and Boris Spassky.

He was instrumental in the creation and distribution of the A Very Special Christmas album series that raised millions of dollars for the Special Olympics, of which he was also a board member.

== Artist Representation ==
The Marshall Firm secured and defended contract terms for iconic figures in pop, rock, hip-hop, and rock-and-roll history, notably including Whitney Houston, Mary J. Blige, Neil Diamond, James Brown, Jimi Hendrix, KISS, ZZ Top, New Edition, Bob Crewe, MC Hammer, LL Cool J, Heavy D, Jodeci, Sister Sledge, Herman’s Hermits, The Animals, Ornette Coleman, and Lieber and Stoller, among others.

== Legal Career ==
Beginning in 1965, Marshall operated as a senior partner across multiple influential entertainment law firms, most notably Marshall & Vigoda.

Marshall was a partner in law firms that represented EMI, CBS Records, Atlantic Records, MCA, Bertelsmann, Twentieth Century Fox, DDB Needham, and The New York Times. In addition to firm-level counsel, Marshall served directly on the board of directors for PolyGram (now Universal Music Group).

He was involved in negotiating or structuring several significant entertainment-industry transactions of the time, including Michael Jackson's acquisition of the Beatles' music publishing catalog, MCA's acquisition of Motown, Atlantic Records in its sale to Warner Communications, Bertelsmann's purchase of Arista Records and RCA's music publishing department, and The New York Times' acquisition of Metromedia.

His philanthropic work included helping to establish the TJ Martell Foundation for cancer research and serving on its board of directors for ten years. Marshall also formed The Royal Initiative to Combat Aids and organized the recording of Songs For Life, a compilation CD that raised funds to fight HIV/AIDS in Africa. He later received the Recording Academy's Entertainment Law Initiative Service Award, an award recognizing attorneys who have supported the music community.

== Representation of Bobby Fischer ==
Outside the immediate sphere of the music business, Marshall represented American chess grandmaster Bobby Fischer. In 1972, Marshall represented broadcaster David Frost and, at a friend's request, was brought in to help resolve the dispute between chess champion Bobby Fischer and the World Chess Federation (FIDE) ahead of the Fischer–Spassky World Chess Championship in Reykjavík. Marshall acted as Fischer's lawyer and manager during the height of his career. In Pawn Sacrifice, the 2014 biographical drama film that culminates with the famous match, Marshall is portrayed by actor Michael Stuhlbarg.

== Personal life ==
Born in New York City on Nov. 19, 1928, Marshall was educated at the Horace Mann School and the University of Wisconsin-Madison. He earned his Juris Doctor at Fordham School of Law.

A brief first marriage ended in divorce. Marshall later married Bette (Lieb) Marshall, an actor and photographer, and had three children and four grandchildren. He died in Aventura, Florida on May 10, 2012, at the age of 83.
