= Me and Bobby Fischer =

Me & Bobby Fischer
- Written by: Fridrik Gudmundsson
- Produced by: Fridrik Gudmundsson
- Starring: Bobby Fischer; Saemundur Palsson
- Cinematography: Fridrik Gudmundsson
- Music by: Einar Arnaldur Melax; Guðlaugur Kristinn Óttarsson; Óttar Proppe; Björk Guðmundsdóttir; Jón Ísólfsson
- Distributed by: Fridrik Gudmundsson
- Release date: 17 April 2009
- Running time: 82 minutes
- Country: Iceland
- Language: English

Me & Bobby Fischer is a documentary about Bobby Fischer's last years as his old friend Saemundur Palsson gets him out of jail in Japan and helps him settle in Iceland.

The film premiered at the Green Light Films’ Bíódagar film festival in April 2009.

== Cast ==
- Bobby Fischer
- Saemundur Palsson
- Kári Stefánsson

== Festivals ==
- Green Light Reykjavik

== See also ==
- List of books and documentaries by or about Bobby Fischer
