= Shelby Lyman =

American chess player and teacher (1936–2019)

Personal information
- Full name: Shelbourne Richard Lyman
- Born: October 22, 1936 Brooklyn Jewish Hospital; Brooklyn, New York
- Died: August 11, 2019 (aged 82) Johnson City, New York

Chess career
- Country: United States

Shelbourne Richard Lyman (October 22, 1936 – August 11, 2019) was an American chess player and teacher known for hosting a live broadcast of the 1972 World Chess Championship for the PBS television station Channel 13 in New York. This broadcast became the highest-rated public television program ever at the time, far surpassing viewership expectations.

Shelby Lyman was born in Brooklyn, New York but grew up in the Dorchester neighborhood of Boston, Massachusetts. He graduated from the Boston Latin School and Harvard University who after graduation taught sociology at the City College of New York for three and a half years.

Shortly after the 1972 World Championship ended, he began writing a syndicated column about chess for Newsday; at its peak, this column was published in 82 newspapers around the world.

He later hosted a two-hour broadcast covering the World Chess Championship 1986. This segment was recorded at WNYE-TV in Brooklyn and aired across 120 public television stations.

Shelby Lyman's uncle, Harry Lyman, was a chess master in New England.

== Chess playing career ==
Lyman won the Boston Chess Championship as a teenager. When he was twenty-seven, he won the Marshall Chess Club Championship in New York City. At one point, he was the 18th-highest-ranked player in the United States.
