= Pawn Sacrifice =

2014 film by Edward Zwick

- Theatrical release poster
- Directed by: Edward Zwick
- Screenplay by: Steven Knight
- Story by: Steven Knight; Stephen J. Rivele; Christopher Wilkinson
- Produced by: Gail Katz; Tobey Maguire; Edward Zwick
- Starring: Tobey Maguire; Peter Sarsgaard; Liev Schreiber; Michael Stuhlbarg; Lily Rabe; Robin Weigert
- Cinematography: Bradford Young
- Edited by: Steven Rosenblum
- Music by: James Newton Howard
- Production companies: Gail Katz Productions; MICA Entertainment; Material Pictures; PalmStar Media
- Distributed by: Bleecker Street (United States and Canada); Lionsgate (International)
- Release dates: September 11, 2014 (TIFF); September 16, 2015 (United States)
- Running time: 115 minutes
- Country: United States
- Language: English
- Budget: $19 million
- Box office: $5.6 million

Pawn Sacrifice is a 2014 American biographical psychological drama film about Bobby Fischer, a chess grandmaster and the eleventh world champion. It follows Fischer's challenge against top Soviet chess grandmasters during the Cold War and culminating in the World Chess Championship 1972 match versus Boris Spassky in Reykjavík, Iceland. It was directed by Edward Zwick and written by Steven Knight, and stars Tobey Maguire as Fischer, Liev Schreiber as Spassky, Lily Rabe as Joan Fischer, and Peter Sarsgaard as William Lombardy. It was released in the United States on September 16, 2015.

The film received generally positive reviews, with many critics praising Maguire's performance, but grossed only $5 million worldwide against a budget of $19 million.

== Plot ==
In 1972, Bobby Fischer tears apart his hotel room in a paranoid delusional state, believing he is being spied upon by the Soviet KGB.

Two decades earlier, in 1951 Brooklyn, Fischer's mother, a Soviet Jewish immigrant, explains to 8-year-old Bobby that the FBI has her under surveillance because she supports Marxist revolution in the U.S. She coaches Bobby on what to say to the FBI if he is ever approached.

Bobby immerses himself in chess after his mother takes him to an adult chess club, where his skilled play gets him accepted. Bobby becomes the youngest grandmaster of professional chess championships ever. At a team tournament in Bulgaria he discovers Soviet grandmasters deliberately drawing games with the collusion of the World Chess Federation. Ranting that this system makes it impossible for a non-Soviet player to win the championship, Bobby gives up chess and returns to the U.S. Lawyer Paul Marshall offers to help him modify the tournament rules, working pro bono to give Fischer a fair chance to win future tournaments. He re-enters professional chess and selects Father William Lombardy, a former World Junior Chess Champion and Roman Catholic priest, as his second.

At the height of the Cold War, Soviet domination of the World Chess Championship is being exploited for propaganda as proof that the communist system is superior to American democracy. U.S. president Richard Nixon and Secretary of State Henry Kissinger closely monitor and encourage Bobby's progress, and as his defeat of grandmasters around the world propel him toward the world championship, be becomes a hero to the American public. When Bobby loses to Soviet grandmaster and world champion Boris Spassky at a tournament in California, he angrily berates Spassky on the nearby beach the next day. Lombardy privately tells Marshall that excessive focus on chess strategy has destroyed the sanity of the game's greatest players.

The pressure of pursuing the world championship drives Bobby into paranoia and delusional psychosis. Meeting with Marshall, Bobby's sister Joan quotes from her brother's letters about how the Communists collude with International Jewry to destroy him. Joan explains that Bobby believes this despite being Jewish himself and pleads with Marshall to get Bobby psychiatric help. Marshall is dismissive, and Bobby's escalating breakdown fails to convince Lombardy that Bobby needs therapy and medication.

Reporters and fans from around the world assemble at Reykjavík to witness the historic World Chess Championship 1972 match between Bobby and Spassky. Bobby loses the first game and fails to appear for the second, losing it by forfeit. Bobby is easily distracted by small noises from the audience, rolling cameras, and the hard sound of the chessboard, and increasingly unreasonable demands for absolute silence threaten another forfeit. Spassky, insulted by the possibility of maintaining his title by forfeit, orders the Soviet entourage to accede to Bobby's demands.

Bobby wins the third game by unconventional tactics, draws the fourth game and wins game five after Spassky himself shows signs of paranoia. Bobby uses an opening he has never played before, surprising the audience. His inspired play in the sixth game amazes Spassky, who resigns and leads a standing ovation of Bobby's victory. A postscript reveals the sixth game against Spassky is still considered the greatest chess game ever played. Fischer's delusions worsened, and he went on to forfeit his title and died in 2008 as a fugitive from U.S. prosecution.

== Cast ==
- Tobey Maguire as Bobby Fischer
  - Seamus Davey-Fitzpatrick as Teenage Bobby Fischer
  - Aiden Lovekamp as Young Bobby Fischer
- Liev Schreiber as Boris Spassky
- Lily Rabe as Joan Fischer
  - Sophie Nélisse as Young Joan
- Peter Sarsgaard as William Lombardy
- Michael Stuhlbarg as Paul Marshall
- Robin Weigert as Regina Fischer
- Conrad Pla as Carmine Nigro
- Evelyne Brochu as Donna
- Katie Nolan as Maria
- Edward Zinoviev as Efim Geller
- Brett Watson as Chief Arbiter Lothar Schmid
- Ilia Volok as KGB Guy

== Title meaning ==
Director Edward Zwick explained the meaning of the film's title: "You have Henry Kissinger and Richard Nixon calling Bobby Fischer; you have Brezhnev and the KGB agents following Boris Spassky. Both of these men were pawns of their nations."

== Production ==
Principal photography began in early October 2013 in Reykjavík, Iceland. In mid-October, the remaining 41 days of shooting began in Montreal, Canada, wrapping in Los Angeles on December 11, 2013.

== Release ==
The film had its world premiere at the 2014 Toronto International Film Festival on September 11, 2014. On September 10, 2014, Bleecker Street acquired the U.S. distribution rights to the film, the company's first acquisition. The film was originally set to be released in the United States on September 18, 2015; however, it was pushed up to September 16, with wide releases in both America and Canada on September 25, 2015.

Released on home media on December 22, 2015, the film made $1.1 million in DVD and Blu-ray sales over its first few months.

== Reception ==
=== Box office ===
Pawn Sacrifice has grossed $2.4 million in North America and $3.1 million in other territories for a worldwide total of $5.6 million, against a budget of $19 million.

The film grossed $1 million in the opening weekend of its wide release, finishing 12th at the box office.

=== Critical response ===
On review aggregator Rotten Tomatoes, the film has a rating of 72% based on 120 reviews, with an average rating of 6.41/10. The website's critical consensus reads: "Anchored by a sensitive performance from Tobey Maguire, Pawn Sacrifice adds another solidly gripping drama to the list of films inspired by chess wiz Bobby Fischer." On Metacritic, the film has a weighted average score of 65 out of 100, based on 29 critics, indicating "generally favorable reviews".

Spassky himself called the film "weak" and said that it has "no intrigue"; he noted that the film misrepresents how and why he agreed to continue the match after Fischer failed to show up for the second game.

Anatoly Karpov assessed the film negatively: “Maybe the film is not bad for the popularization of chess, but its content is terrible. There are many inaccuracies. The chess positions are simply idiotic. The film is quite budgetary, so take a chess consultant, pay him a fee, he will correct your position. And then the diagonal from left to right is white. You are making a film about world champions, and such bloopers, for me as a professional, this is terrible”.

== See also ==
- List of books and documentaries by or about Bobby Fischer
- Sacrifice as a common chess move, often with pawns
- The Queen's Gambit
