= Cashmere Mafia =

- Genre: Comedy drama
- Created by: Kevin Wade
- Starring: Lucy Liu; Frances O'Connor; Miranda Otto; Bonnie Somerville
- Composer: Daniel Licht
- Country of origin: United States
- Original language: English
- No. of seasons: 1
- No. of episodes: 7

Production
- Executive producers: Kevin Wade; Gail Katz; Darren Star; Michael Pressman; Jeff Rake
- Camera setup: Single-camera
- Running time: 60 minutes
- Production companies: Gail Katz Productions; Kevin Wade Productions; Darren Star Productions; Sony Pictures Television

Original release
- Network: ABC
- Release: January 6 – February 20, 2008

Cashmere Mafia is an American comedy-drama television series which ran on ABC from January 6, 2008, to February 20, 2008. The series was created by Kevin Wade, who also served as executive producer alongside Darren Star, Gail Katz, Jeff Rake and Michael Pressman, with Susie Fitzgerald co-executive producing. Peyton Reed directed the pilot.

ABC decided not to renew the series for a second season.

== Details ==
Cashmere Mafia follows the lives of four ambitious women, longtime best friends since their days at business school, as they try to balance their glamorous and demanding careers with their complex personal lives by creating their own "boys' club" (The Cashmere Mafia) to protect one another and discuss their personal ups and downs as they try to have it all in New York City.

== Cast ==
=== Principal characters ===
- Lucy Liu: Mia Mason – Publisher at Barnstead Media Group
- Frances O'Connor: Zoe Burden – Former Managing Director of Mergers and Acquisitions at Gorham Sutter
- Miranda Otto: Juliet Draper – COO of Stanton Hall Hotels and Resorts
- Bonnie Somerville: Caitlin Dowd – Senior V.P. for Marketing at Lily Parrish Cosmetics
- Peter Hermann: Davis Draper – Manager of a hedge fund, ex-husband of Juliet
- Julian Ovenden: Eric Burden – Architect, husband of Zoe

=== Recurring characters ===
- Noelle Beck: Cilla Grey – Frienemy of the Cashmere Mafia, had affair with Davis, referred to as "The $100 Million Woman"
- Lourdes Benedicto: Alicia Lawson – Advertising agency rep. Formerly dated Caitlin and is pregnant
- Tom Everett Scott: Jack Cutting – Ex-fiancé and former co-worker of Mia
- Peyton List: Sasha Burden – Zoe's daughter
- Nicholas Art: Luke Burden – Zoe's son
- Addison Timlin: Emily Draper – Juliet's teenage daughter
- Jack J. Yang: Jason Chun – Brain surgeon, formerly dated Mia
- Daniel Gerroll: Clive Hughes – Mia's stern and demanding superior at Barnstead Media Group

== Episodes ==
No.	Title	Directed by	Written by	Original release date	Prod. code
1	"Pilot"	Peyton Reed	Kevin Wade	January 6, 2008	100
Meet the members of the Cashmere Mafia: Mia, Juliet, Caitlin, and Zoe. Friends since business school, these four successful career women live and work in Manhattan where they try to juggle their work life with rocky marriages, family crises, rival colleagues, and everything in between. Mia accepts Jack's marriage proposal, but soon finds herself in competition with him for a promotion. Juliet, a stone-faced, redhead goddess, learns that her husband, Davis, is cheating on her with former school friend Cilla Grey. Later, at a dinner to honor her business, Juliet vows revenge by plotting to be unfaithful too. Zoe tries to juggle her home life involving her loyal architect husband Eric, and their two young kids, Sasha and Luke, and faces off against a brash new nanny whom they hire. Caitlin questions her sexuality when she finds herself attracted to another woman; an ad agency rep named Alicia, who makes a move on her and Caitlin responds positively to it.
2	"Conference Call"	Matthew Penn	Terri Minsky	January 9, 2008	101
Caitlin has her make-up crew transform Juliet from a redhead ice queen to seductress for a hot date with a man from her past, named Bobby Walsh (guest star Bill Sage), just to make Davis jealous. No sooner is Mia appointed publisher of Barnstead Media Group than she is ordered by her mean superior, Clive, to fire her nebbishy mentor, Grant Normandy (guest star Damian Young). Meanwhile, a battle of wills ensues between a sexy stay-at-home supermom (guest star Krista Allen) and working mom Zoe, who discovers that her rival has propositioned Eric with a no-strings-attached work offer that he might find hard to refuse. Caitlin surprises her friends by telling them that Alicia is her newest love interest, and she and Alicia go on their first date to a local nightclub. Couples counseling for Juliet and Davis takes a turn for the worse, and Juliet decides to make some changes herself.
3	"Dangerous Liaisons"	Lee Rose	Jeff Rake	January 16, 2008	102
Juliet struggles with her feelings about Davis as she contemplates a down-and-dirty tryst with her former boyfriend Bobby Walsh. Meanwhile, Mia butts heads with Todd (guest star Jason Antoon), the new male editor she hired to re-launch "Modern Man" magazine. Zoe is caught in the middle of a messy office affair between Clayton (guest star Kevin Kilner), a fellow managing director who is married, and Katherine (guest star Kate Levering), her young research analyst. A nervous Caitlin must deal with being outed as a lesbian by a gossip blog run by Cilla Grey, and begins to avoid Alicia.
4	"The Deciders"	Joe Napolitano	Mike Chessler & Chris Alberghini	January 23, 2008	103
Caitlin and Alicia attend a lesbian bridal shower, where an overwhelmed Caitlin finds she still can be attracted to an incredibly hot guy. Mia's parents fix her up on a blind date with an Asian neurosurgeon who, to Mia's surprise, doesn't call her afterwards. Upon discovering that her ex-fiance, Jack—who has recently hooked up with an attractive news anchor—will be at a group brunch hosted by a mutual friend, Mia decides to bring the good doctor, Jason Chung, with her to make Jack jealous. Meanwhile, Zoe is called on to save Clayton and Katherine during a meeting with an important client, after they conspired to keep her out of the meeting. Juliet struggles to trust her husband, Davis, after catching him in a questionable meeting with his former mistress, Cilla Gray.
5	"Stay With Me"	Steve Gomer	Kevin Wade	February 6, 2008	104
Zoe and Eric struggle to find time to celebrate their 10th wedding anniversary, as Zoe meets up with a ruggedly handsome colleague in Southampton on business, as Eric tries to find the time to head out there. Back in Manhattan, Juliet and Davis, whose marriage is already under fire, discover a provocative photo of Emily on the Internet, and learn just how much emotionally troubled their teen daughter is. Meanwhile, Alicia drops a bomb on Caitlin that she's pregnant, which may change their relationship, which leads Caitlin to run into the arms of her new male friend Sam. Under mounting pressure at work, Mia is anxious about a new relationship with Jason Chung, even as Eric and Zoe's sexy new manny, Adam (guest star Val Emmich), becomes a tempting distraction to her.
6	"Yours, Mine and Hers"	Matt Earl Beesley	Claudia Lonow & Terri Minsky	February 13, 2008	105
Mia and Caitlin search Jack's apartment for a revealing sex tape Mia made with him, even as the ex-couple continue to fight their feelings for one another. Just as Caitlin warms up to the idea of being a mother, Olivia (guest star Kelly Deadmon), Alicia's ex-partner, stings her by telling her there is no room for another "mother" or a bad role model like Caitlin in the baby's life. Meanwhile, Zoe battles to land a new billionaire client, but her unappreciated efforts force her to make a life-changing decision and quit her job. The nasty divorce battle for property ownership heats up between Juliet and Davis with both of them resorting to low and underhanded means to emotionally destroy one another.
7	"Dog Eat Dog"	Matt Penn	Lizzy Weiss & Tze Chun & Mike Weiss	February 20, 2008	106
A charming multi-billionaire named Len Dinerstein (guest star Peter Riegert) pursues Juliet, both personally and professionally, in an attempt to take over her company. Caitlin's job is on the line as her boss, cosmetic's titan Lily Parrish, puts mounting pressure on her to produce a big publicity splash during Fashion Week. Elsewhere, Mia falls for a stray dog, but is unable to pass the ownership test for pet adoption by the animal shelter rep (guest star Wallace Shawn). Mia also begins to doubt where she stands with her romance with Jason. Meanwhile, the newly unemployed, stay-at-home mom Zoe struggles to be the perfect mother, much as she once aspired to be the perfect executive in a take-charge manner.

== DVD releases ==
On September 23, 2008, Sony Pictures Home Entertainment released the complete series on DVD in Region 1. This release has been discontinued and is out of print.

On August 2, 2016, Mill Creek Entertainment will re-release the complete series on DVD in Region 1.

== Production and airing ==
Produced by Sony Pictures Television, Darren Star Productions and Gail Katz Productions, the series was officially greenlit and given a thirteen-episode order on May 11, 2007. The series was initially scheduled to air as a mid-season replacement, with plans for a debut on November 27, 2007, on ABC as an off-season replacement for the Dancing with the Stars results show. However, due to the 2007–2008 Writers Guild of America strike, only 7 of the 13 episodes ordered were produced. ABC also delayed the premiere of the series due to future concerns about programming and promotions. Cashmere Mafia had a special preview on Sunday, January 6, 2008, and then moved to its regular time slot on Wednesday, January 9 at 10:00PM Eastern/9:00PM Central following Supernanny as a mid-season replacement for Dirty Sexy Money. It competed indirectly with NBC's Lipstick Jungle, created by Star's former creative partner from Sex and the City, Candace Bushnell.

It has also been purchased by Polsat in Poland, NTV7 in Malaysia, MediaCorp TV Channel 5 in Singapore, RTÉ Two in Ireland, RTL 5 in the Netherlands, on KanaalTwee in Belgium, Nova TV in Croatia, TVI in Portugal, TV2 in New Zealand, Nine Network in Australia, E! in Canada, Nelonen in Finland, on AXN in India, on RTV Pink in Serbia, TV3 in Denmark, on Multivisión in Cuba, on Téva and M6 in France, on Domashniy in Russia and also in Italy by Mediaset.

#	Episode	Rating	Share	Rating/Share (18–49)	Viewers (millions)	Rank (timeslot)	Rank (night)	Rank (week)
1	"Pilot"	7.1	12	3.8/9	10.72	2	8	20
2	"Conference Call"	4.3	7	2.3/6	6.16	3	8	54
3	"Dangerous Liaisons"	3.8	6	2.2/6	5.39	3	8	56
4	"The Deciders"	3.8	6	2.0/5	5.58	3	9	N/A
5	"Stay With Me"	3.7	6	2.0/5	5.09	3	11	64
6	"Yours, Mine and Hers"	3.9	6	2.0/5	5.25	3	9	64
7	"Dog Eat Dog"	3.5	6	1.6/4	4.77	3	12	67
