= Gail Katz =

American film producer

Gail Katz is a film, television, and theatrical producer.

== Career ==
Katz began her career at New World Pictures. In 1991, she produced her first film entitled, Shattered. Katz is currently a professor at the USC School of Cinematic Arts.

=== Filmography ===
Year	Film	Credit
1991	Shattered	Co-producer
1993	In the Line of Fire	Executive producer
1995	Outbreak	
1997	Air Force One	
1997	Red Corner	Executive producer
1998	Mighty Joe Young	Executive producer
1999	Instinct	Executive producer
1999	Bicentennial Man	
2000	The Perfect Storm	
2014	Pawn Sacrifice	
TBA	The Settlers of Catan	

=== Television ===
Year	Title	Credit	Notes
2001−03	The Agency	Executive producer	
2008	Cashmere Mafia	Executive producer	
2019	The College Admissions Scandal	Executive producer	Television film
