= World Chess Championship 1972 =

Match between Bobby Fischer and Boris Spassky

	Defending champion	Challenger
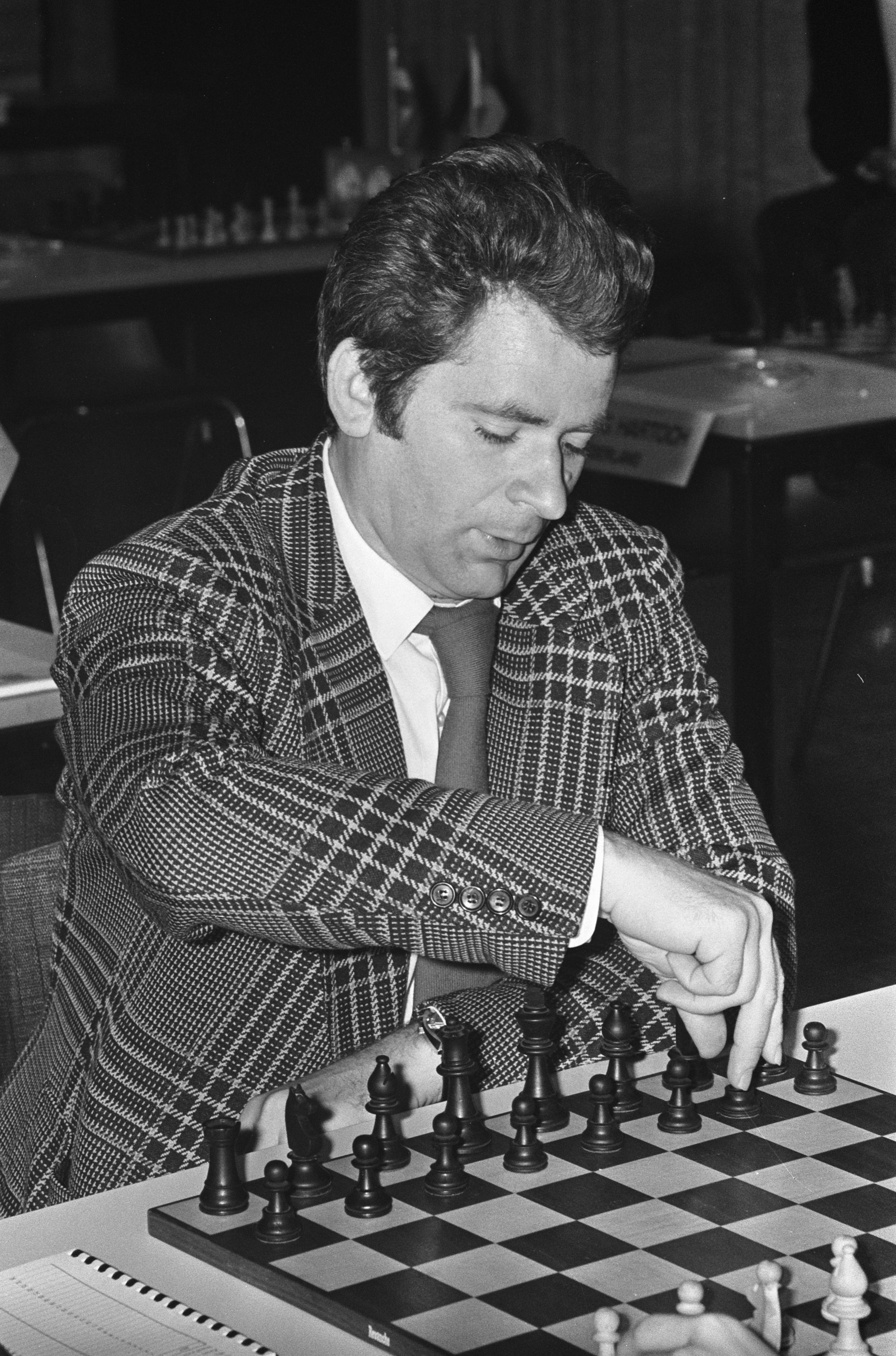
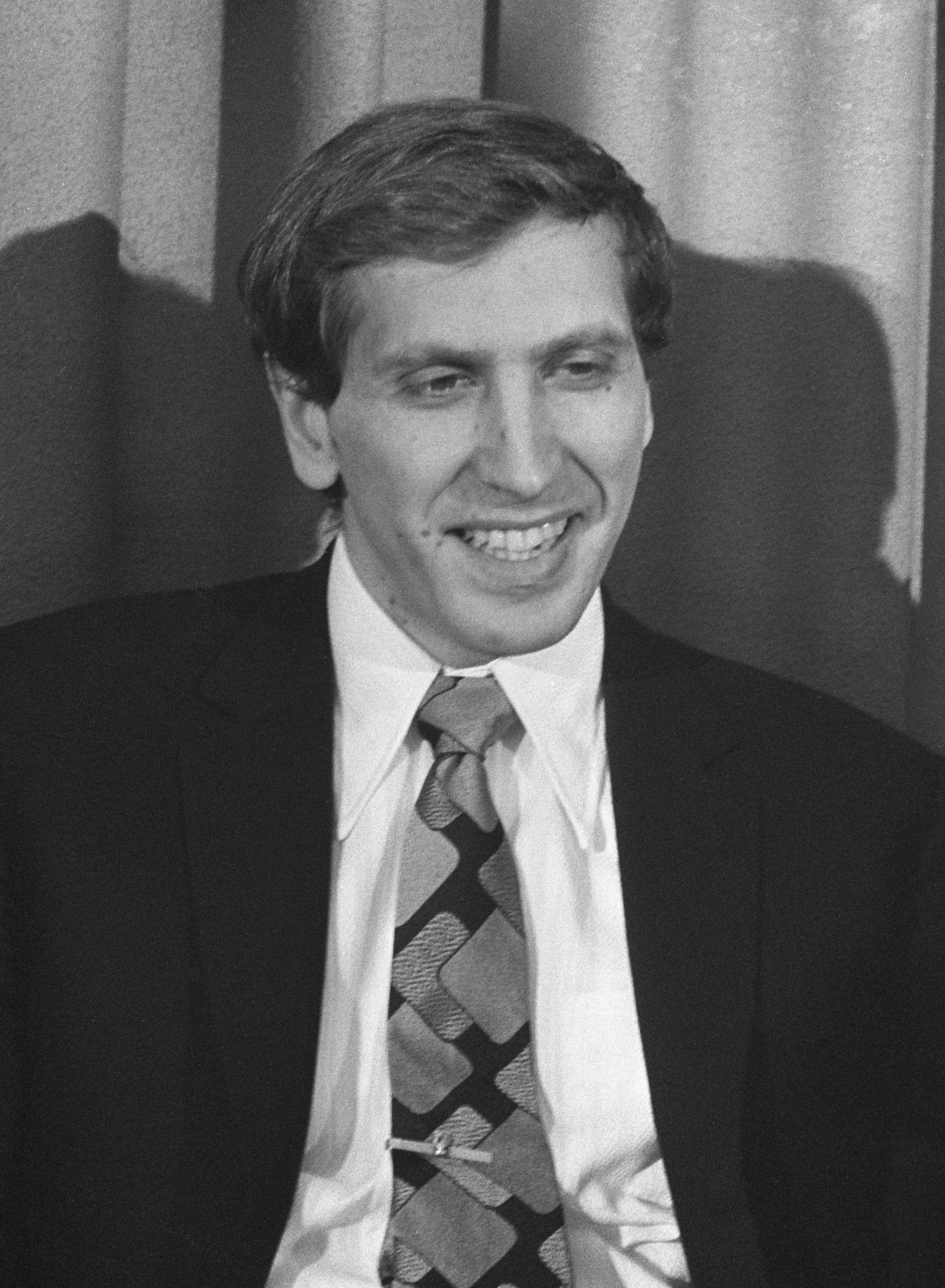
	Boris Spassky	Bobby Fischer
	(Soviet Union) Boris Spassky	(United States) Bobby Fischer
8½	Scores	12½
	Born 30 January 1937; 35 years old	Born 9 March 1943; 29 years old
	Winner of the 1969 World Chess Championship	Winner of the 1971 Candidates Tournament
	Rating: 2660 (World No. 2)	Rating: 2785 (World No. 1)

The World Chess Championship 1972 was a match for the World Chess Championship between challenger Bobby Fischer of the United States and defending champion Boris Spassky of the Soviet Union. The match took place in the Laugardalshöll in Reykjavík, Iceland, and has been dubbed the Match of the Century. Fischer became the first US-born player to win the world title. Fischer's win also ended, for a short time, 24 years of Soviet domination of the World Championship.

Fischer won the right to challenge for the World Championship after dominant performances during the qualification cycle, in which he defeated some of the world's leading players by unprecedented margins. The first game was played on July 11, 1972. The 21st and last game, begun on August 31, was adjourned after 40 moves, with Spassky resigning the next day without resuming play. Fischer won the match 12½–8½, becoming the eleventh undisputed world champion. The match was covered in the United States on ABC's Wide World of Sports and by Shelby Lyman on WNET.

== Qualification cycle ==
=== 1970 Interzonal tournament ===
The Interzonal tournament was held in Palma de Mallorca, Spain, in November and December 1970. The top six players of the interzonal (shown in bold in the table below) qualified for the Candidates matches. Fischer had not qualified to play in this event, as he had not participated in the 1969 US Championship (Zonal). Pal Benko (and the reserve William Lombardy) gave up their spot, however, and FIDE President Max Euwe controversially allowed Fischer to participate instead.

1970 Interzonal Tournament
		1	2	3	4	5	6	7	8	9	10	11	12	13	14	15	16	17	18	19	20	21	22	23	24	Total	Tiebreak
1	**Bobby Fischer** (United States)	–	0	1	½	1	1	½	1	½	1	1	1	1	1	1	1	1	½	1	1	½	½	1	½	**18½**	
2	**Bent Larsen** (Denmark)	1	–	½	½	0	1	½	½	½	½	1	1	0	½	½	1	½	1	½	1	1	½	1	½	**15**	**167.50**
3	**Efim Geller** (Soviet Union)	0	½	–	1	½	1	½	1	½	½	½	1	½	½	1	½	1	½	½	½	1	1	½	½	**15**	**167.00**
4	**Robert Hübner** (West Germany)	½	½	0	–	½	1	½	0	½	½	0	½	½	1	½	1	1	1	1	½	1	1	1	1	**15**	**155.25**
5	**Mark Taimanov** (Soviet Union)	0	1	½	½	–	½	½	½	½	½	½	0	½	0	1	1	½	1	½	1	½	1	1	1	**14**	**146.50**
6	**Wolfgang Uhlmann** (East Germany)	0	0	0	0	½	–	1	½	½	1	½	½	1	½	0	1	½	1	1	½	1	1	1	1	**14**	**141.50**
7	Lajos Portisch (Hungary)	½	½	½	½	½	0	–	½	0	1	½	1	1	½	½	½	1	½	½	1	½	1	1	0	13½	149.75
8	Vasily Smyslov (Soviet Union)	0	½	0	1	½	½	½	–	1	½	½	0	½	½	½	½	½	½	1	1	½	1	1	1	13½	141.00
9	Lev Polugaevsky (Soviet Union)	½	½	½	½	½	½	1	0	–	½	1	½	½	½	½	1	0	½	1	1	½	½	½	½	13	146.75
10	Svetozar Gligorić (Yugoslavia)	0	½	½	½	½	0	0	½	½	–	1	½	1	½	1	½	½	1	0	½	1	½	1	1	13	135.50
11	Oscar Panno (Argentina)	0	0	½	1	½	½	½	½	0	0	–	½	½	½	1	1	½	½	½	½	1	1	½	1	12½	130.75
12	Henrique Mecking (Brazil)	0	0	0	½	1	½	0	1	½	½	½	–	1	½	½	½	½	0	½	½	1	1	1	1	12½	130.00
13	Vlastimil Hort (Czechoslovakia)	0	1	½	½	½	0	0	½	½	0	½	0	–	1	½	1	½	½	½	½	1	½	1	½	11½	
14	Borislav Ivkov (Yugoslavia)	0	½	½	0	1	½	½	½	½	½	½	½	0	–	½	½	0	½	½	½	½	1	½	½	10½	
15	Duncan Suttles (Canada)	0	½	0	½	0	1	½	½	½	0	0	½	½	½	–	0	½	½	1	½	0	1	½	1	10	105.75
16	Dragoljub Minić (Yugoslavia)	0	0	½	0	0	0	½	½	0	½	0	½	0	½	1	–	1	½	½	½	1	½	1	1	10	96.00
17	Samuel Reshevsky (United States)	0	½	0	0	½	½	0	½	1	½	½	½	½	1	½	0	–	½	½	½	0	0	½	1	9½	
18	Milan Matulović (Yugoslavia)	½	0	½	0	0	0	½	½	½	0	½	1	½	½	½	½	½	–	½	½	0	0	½	1	9	98.50
19	William Addison (United States)	0	½	½	0	½	0	½	0	0	1	½	½	½	½	0	½	½	½	–	½	0	0	1	1	9	95.25
20	Miroslav Filip (Czechoslovakia)	0	0	½	½	0	½	0	0	0	½	½	½	½	½	½	½	½	½	½	–	½	1	½	0	8½	91.50
21	Renato Naranja (Philippines)	½	0	0	0	½	0	½	½	½	0	0	0	0	½	1	0	1	1	1	½	–	0	0	1	8½	88.75
22	Tudev Ujtumen (Mongolia)	½	½	0	0	0	0	0	0	½	½	0	0	½	0	0	½	1	1	1	0	1	–	1	½	8½	85.25
23	Jorge Rubinetti (Argentina)	0	0	½	0	0	0	0	0	½	0	½	0	0	½	½	0	½	½	0	½	1	0	–	1	6	
24	Eleazar Jiménez (Cuba)	½	½	½	0	0	0	1	0	½	0	0	0	½	½	0	0	0	0	0	1	0	½	0	–	5½	

In early 1971, Portisch and Smyslov contested a six-game playoff in Portorož, Yugoslavia, for the reserve position for the Candidates Tournament. The match ended 3–3; Portisch was declared the winner because of a better tie-break score in the main tournament.

=== 1971 Candidates matches ===
Petrosian, as the loser of the last championship match, and Korchnoi, as runner-up of the previous Candidates final, were seeded directly into the Candidates match stage, and were joined by the top six from the Interzonal. In the Petrosian–Hübner quarterfinal in Seville, Hübner withdrew from the match after a loss in the 7th game after several disputes with the organizers. The quarterfinals and semifinals matches were played as the best of 10 games. The final match was the best of 12 games.

Fischer dominated the 1971 Candidates matches; his 6–0–0 victories over both Mark Taimanov and Bent Larsen were unparalleled at the Candidates level. His loss to Tigran Petrosian in game 2 of the Candidates Final ended a 20-game winning streak.

The first game of the finals started on September 30, 1971. Fischer came with Larry Evans and Ed Edmondson as his seconds, while Petrosian arrived with Alexei Suetin and Yuri Averbakh.

Quarterfinals
Vancouver, May 1971
(United States) **Bobby Fischer**	**6**
(Soviet Union) Mark Taimanov	0
Las Palmas, May–June 1971
(Denmark) **Bent Larsen**	**5½**
(East Germany) Wolfgang Uhlmann	3½
Moscow, May 1971
(Soviet Union) **Viktor Korchnoi**	**5½**
(Soviet Union) Efim Geller	2½
Seville, May 1971
(Soviet Union) **Tigran Petrosian**	**4**
(West Germany) Robert Hübner (withdrew)	3

Semifinals
Denver, July 1971
(United States) **Bobby Fischer**	**6**
(Denmark) Bent Larsen	0
Moscow, July 1971
(Soviet Union) Viktor Korchnoi	4½
(Soviet Union) **Tigran Petrosian**	**5½**

Final
Buenos Aires, Sep–Oct 1971
(United States) **Bobby Fischer**	**6½**
(Soviet Union) Tigran Petrosian	2½

Fischer's victory earned him the right to challenge reigning champion Spassky for the title.

== 1972 World Championship match ==
=== Background ===
The match was played during the Cold War, albeit during a period of increasing détente. The Soviet Chess School had a 24-year monopoly on the world championship, with Spassky the latest in an uninterrupted chain of Soviet world chess champions stretching back to the 1948 championship. The surrounding "American versus Russian" narrative within the Cold War context sparked much excitement worldwide and an unprecedented increase in media coverage for any chess match.

Fischer, an eccentric (Note: "Fischer, according to some of the psychiatrists who are regulars at the Manhattan Chess Club, is a paranoid and is 'psychotically suspicious, like most paranoids'.") 29-year-old American, claimed that Soviet players gained an unfair advantage by agreeing to short draws among themselves in tournaments. (Note: "Bobby Fischer, then as now the enfant terrible of the chess world, charged that the Russians were in collusion, agreeing to draw with each other while playing no-holds-barred games with non-Russians, and to nothing to jeopardize the position of whichever one of them was leading.") In 1962, the American magazine Sports Illustrated and the German magazine Der Spiegel published Fischer's article "The Russians Have Fixed World Chess", in which he expounded this view. Fischer himself rarely agreed to early draws.

Spassky faced enormous political pressure in the Soviet Union to win the match. (Note: "Throughout all the Soviet comments on their chess successes runs the theme that more than chess is at stake. For example, when Botvinnik won the world title in 1948 Pravda commented, 'Botvinnik was not simply playing chess, he was defending the honour of his country', and in 1961 The Moral Code of the Builder of Communism stated, 'Our task is to educate chess-players towards communist consciousness, love of labour and discipline and loyalty to the good of society.'") (Note: "When Botvinnik won the Nottingham tournament of 1936, Pravda said in an editorial that his victory was a triumph of Marxist–Leninist chess". (originally published in De Tijd, June 28, 1972)) (Note: "Spassky, of course, was carrying a burden that Fischer was not laden with: he was playing not only for himself, but also for the Soviet government, the Soviet system. He represented an ideology. Soviet chess players were supreme, so the theory went, because the Soviet social, political and governmental system was so much better.") Fischer was often critical of his home country ("Americans want to plunk in front of a TV and don't want to open a book"), but he too carried a burden of expectation because of the match's political significance. No American had won the world championship since the first champion, Wilhelm Steinitz, became a naturalized U.S. citizen in 1888. The unusually high public interest and excitement surrounding the match was so great that it was called the "Match of the Century", (Note: One of the best-selling book on the match was subtitled The New York Times Report on the Chess Match of the Century (Roberts, Schonberg, Horowitz & Reshevsky 1972). Gligorić's book on the match was also subtitled The Chess Match of the Century (Gligorić 1972).) (Note: "Even before a move has been made, this breathtaking, blood-curdling and heartrending encounter is justly being labelled as 'the Match of the Century'." (originally published in De Tijd, June 28, 1972)) even though the same term had been applied to the USSR vs. Rest of the World match two years earlier. (Note: The term is used that way in Russian, and also by Edmar Mednis in his book How to Beat Bobby Fischer.)

Spassky had qualified for world championship matches in 1966 and 1969. He lost the world championship match to Tigran Petrosian in 1966. In the 1969 cycle, he won matches against Efim Geller, Bent Larsen, and Viktor Korchnoi to win the right to challenge a second time, then defeated Petrosian 12½–10½ to win the world title. He is often said to have had a "universal style [...] involving an ability to play the most varied types of positions", but Garry Kasparov notes that "from childhood he clearly had a leaning toward sharp, attacking play, and possessed a splendid feel for the initiative."

Fischer was in dominant form. In the Candidates matches en route to becoming the challenger in 1972, he had beaten two grandmasters, Mark Taimanov and Bent Larsen, by perfect scores of 6–0, a feat not previously achieved in a Candidates match. In the Candidates final against Petrosian, Fischer won the first game, lost the second, drew the next three, then finished with four consecutive wins to win the match 6½–2½. "No bare statement conveys the magnitude and impact of these results. ... Fischer sowed devastation." From the last seven rounds of the Interzonal until the first game against Petrosian, Fischer won 19 games (plus one win by forfeit) without losing once, almost all against top grandmasters.

Fischer also had a much higher Elo rating than Spassky. On the July 1972 FIDE rating list, Fischer's 2785 was a record 125 points ahead of Spassky, the number two player, rated 2660. Fischer's recent results made him the favorite, (Note: "Despite his dismal score against Spassky, Fischer is the choice of nearly every expert. Indeed, London bookmakers favor him 6-to-5.") (Note: Of the players and expert commentators at the annual Hastings Christmas tournament in 1971–72, apart from one International Master who predicted a Spassky victory, almost everyone else predicted that Fischer would win easily.) (Note: "Lay opinion is overwhelmingly in support of Fischer, expert opinion is divided in the proportion of about 2 to 1 in his favour.") but some observers noted that Fischer had never won a game against Spassky. Before the match, Fischer had played five games against Spassky, drawing two and losing three.

Spassky's seconds for the match were Efim Geller, Nikolai Krogius, and Iivo Nei. Fischer's was William Lombardy. His entourage also included lawyer Paul Marshall, who played a significant role in the events surrounding the match, and USCF representative Fred Cramer. The match's arbiter was Lothar Schmid.

World-class match play (i.e., a series of games between the same two opponents) often involves one or both players preparing one or two openings deeply and playing them repeatedly. (Note: An extreme example of this was seen in the 1927 World Championship match between José Raúl Capablanca and Alexander Alekhine, where all but two of the 34 games featured the Queen's Gambit Declined.) Preparation for such a match also involves analysis of lines the opponent is known to play. Fischer was famous for his unusually narrow opening repertoire, almost invariably playing 1.e4 as White, and almost always playing the Najdorf Variation of the Sicilian Defense as Black against 1.e4. (Note: "Before the match there was a lot of talk that it is comparatively easy to prepare for Fischer, because he is very conservative in his choice of openings. Especially with White, Fischer plays [1.e4] almost without exception.") He surprised Spassky by repeatedly switching openings and by playing openings he had never or only rarely played before (such as 1.c4 as White, and Alekhine's Defense, the Pirc Defense, and the Paulsen Sicilian as Black). Even in openings that Fischer had played before in the match, he continually deviated from the variations he had previously played, almost never repeating a line.

=== Prize negotiations and opening ceremony controversy ===
For some time, it seemed as though the match might not be played at all. Shortly before the match, Fischer demanded that he and Spassky receive 30% of the box-office receipts, in addition to the agreed-upon prize fund of $125,000 (split five-eighths to the winner, three-eighths to the loser) and 30% of the proceeds from television and film rights. Fischer agreed to play after British investment banker Jim Slater doubled the prize fund, and after much persuasion, including a phone call from Henry Kissinger (the US National Security Advisor).

Fischer did not arrive in Iceland in time for the July 1 opening ceremony required to determine the playing colors, and FIDE President Max Euwe postponed the match by two days. Spassky, who appeared at the opening ceremony, refused to draw the colors by himself and asked FIDE to subject Fischer to a penalty, Fischer's forfeit of the first game, and the Russian delegation insisted on an apology from both Fischer and the FIDE President. Euwe signed a document condemning the action of the Championship Challenger and declaring that the postponement "violated the FIDE rules" for "special reason". Fischer wrote a letter of apology with his lawyer Paul Marshall. According to Marshall, in the first draft Fischer renounced his share of the prize money, but the draft wasn't publicly available, since it contained "things damaging to Bobby". In the letter, Fischer explained that his absence was caused by being "carried away by his petty dispute over money with Icelandic chess organizers" and asked for a favor to withdraw the forfeit penalty, saying it would put him at "tremendous handicap" and he "didn't believe that the world's champion desired such an advantage".

After Spassky received the letter of apology on July 6, the Russian head of the State Sports Committee, Sergei Pavlov, told Spassky that he had every right to refuse to play the match and insisted he return to Moscow. Spassky "politely and diplomatically" declined to follow the recommendation and said he would see the match through "despite Fischer's outrageous" conduct. The match was again postponed, to July 11, now initiated by Spassky as a "face-saving measure" to convince Pavlov that the Soviet Union's honor had been preserved. Fischer agreed, cementing his condition to drop Spassky's demand for a forfeit. Some commentators said Fischer was "playing a game of psychological warfare with Spassky, and his demands, his protest, his disappearance—all were calculated to unnerve the supposedly unflappable Russian."

=== Regulations and results ===
The match was played as the best of 24 games, with wins counting 1 point and draws counting ½ point, ending when a player scored 12½ points. If the match ended in a 12–12 tie, the defending champion would retain the title. The first time control was 40 moves in 2½ hours. Three games per week were scheduled. Each player was entitled to three postponements for medical reasons during the match. Games were scheduled to start on Sunday, Tuesday, and Thursday. If a game was adjourned, it was to be continued the next day. Saturday was a rest day. Over the course of the match, the contestants moved their pieces nearly two thousand times. (Note: The source counted the full moves, defined as a turn made by both players, White and Black. A turn by either White or Black is a half-move, or (in computer context) one ply. Byrne and Nei counted "nearly one thousand" moves.)

Fischer insisted that a Staunton design chess set from Jaques of London be used. The chessboard had to be modified at Fischer's request. The match was covered throughout the world. Fischer became a worldwide celebrity, described as the Einstein of chess. His hotel received dozens of calls each day from women attracted to him, and Fischer enjoyed reading the numerous letters and telegrams that arrived, whether with compliments or criticisms. The day of the first game, he arrived shortly after five o'clock, the scheduled starting time, due to heavy traffic.

World Chess Championship Match 1972
	Rating	1	2	3	4	5	6	7	8	9	10	11	12	13	14	15	16	17	18	19	20	21	Points
Boris Spassky (USSR)	2660	1	1	0	½	0	0	½	0	½	0	1	½	0	½	½	½	½	½	½	½	0	8½
Bobby Fischer (USA)	2785	0	0	1	½	1	1	½	1	½	1	0	½	1	½	½	½	½	½	½	½	1	12½
Running totals																							
Boris Spassky (USSR)	2660	1	2	2	2½	2½	2½	3	3	3½	3½	4½	5	5	5½	6	6½	7	7½	8	8½	8½	8½
Bobby Fischer (USA)	2785	0	0	1	1½	2½	3½	4	5	5½	6½	6½	7	8	8½	9	9½	10	10½	11	11½	12½	12½

== Games ==
=== Game 1: Spassky–Fischer, 1–0 (Nimzo-Indian Main) ===
Spassky–Fischer, game 1

Position: f8 black king, a7 black pawn, b7 black pawn, g7 black pawn, h7 black pawn, e6 black pawn, f6 black pawn, b5 white pawn, a3 white pawn, d3 white king, e3 white pawn, f2 white pawn, g2 white pawn, h2 black bishop, c1 white bishop

Position after Fischer played 29...Bxh2

July 11. At the beginning of play, Fischer was not present. Spassky played 1.d4 and pressed the clock, and nine minutes elapsed before Fischer arrived, shook hands with Spassky, and responded 1...Nf6. The opening was a placid Nimzo-Indian Defense, and after 17...Ba4 the game was even (according to analysis by Filip). After a series of piece exchanges it appeared to be a dead-drawn ending, and no one would have been surprised if the players had agreed to a draw here.

Shockingly, Fischer played 29...Bxh2? (Note: Garry Kasparov (2004b), Max Euwe & Jan Timman (2009), Dmitry Plisetsky & Sergey Voronkov (2005), Svetozar Gligoric (1972), and C.H.O'D. Alexander (1972) all give this move one question mark (a bad move but not a blunder). Larry Evans & Ken Smith (1973), and Richard Roberts, Harold Schonberg, Al Horowitz & Samuel Reshevsky (1972) give it "?!" (a dubious move).) as shown, a move that few players would consider in light of the obvious 30.g3, trapping the bishop. In exchange for the lost bishop, Black can obtain only two pawns (see chess piece relative value). Gligorić, Kasparov, and other commentators have suggested that Fischer miscalculated, having planned 30...h5 31.Ke2 h4 32.Kf3 h3 33.Kg4 Bg1 but overlooking that 34.Kxh3 Bxf2 35.Bd2 keeps the bishop trapped. Anatoly Karpov suggested that Spassky was afraid of Fischer and wanted to show that he could draw with the white pieces, while Fischer wanted to disprove that as the game headed for a stale draw. Owing to unusual features of the position, Fischer had good drawing chances despite having only two pawns for the bishop. Fischer resigned on move 56. (Note: Robert Byrne wrote, "The wonder is that, even though he now loses the bishop for two pawns, he would have been able to draw had it not been for his later mistakes." But the position became hopeless after he made at least one more bad move (39th and/or 40th, see cited source) before the adjournment, which took place after move 40. Fischer could still have drawn the game with the correct 39th or 40th move. all give Fischer's 40th move as a bad move, stating that he could still have drawn with the correct 40th move. More recent books by Kasparov 2004b (p. 435) and Plisetsky & Voronkov 2005 (p. 443) give Fischer's 39th move as weak, claiming that his last opportunity to draw the game was with 39...e5! Mednis 1997 (pp. 274–76) says that Fischer's 37th move was bad, and thinks he missed a draw with 37...a6. Euwe & Timman 2009 (pp. 55–57), citing analysis of Friðrik Ólafsson and independently Jon Speelman say that Fischer could have forced a draw after 36.a4? with 37...a6 or with 39...e5. Speelman analyzed the position in depth in his 1980 book, Analysing the Endgame, pp. 74–80, taking into account previous analysis by others. He states that 29...Bxh2 was a bad move, giving White excellent winning chances without any compensating chances for Black. But the position was not lost after that move; only after two more errors (37...Ke4?! and 39...f5?) was Black was clearly lost.)

Nimzo-Indian Defense: Main Variation (ECO E56)
1. d4 Nf6 2. c4 e6 3. Nf3 d5 4. Nc3 Bb4 5. e3 0-0 6. Bd3 c5 7. 0-0 Nc6 8. a3 Ba5 9. Ne2 dxc4 10. Bxc4 Bb6 11. dxc5 Qxd1 12. Rxd1 Bxc5 13. b4 Be7 14. Bb2 Bd7 15. Rac1 Rfd8 16. Ned4 Nxd4 17. Nxd4 Ba4 18. Bb3 Bxb3 19. Nxb3 Rxd1+ 20. Rxd1 Rc8 21. Kf1 Kf8 22. Ke2 Ne4 23. Rc1 Rxc1 24. Bxc1 f6 25. Na5 Nd6 26. Kd3 Bd8 27. Nc4 Bc7 28. Nxd6 Bxd6 29. b5 Bxh2 (diagram) 30. g3 h5 31. Ke2 h4 32. Kf3 Ke7 33. Kg2 hxg3 34. fxg3 Bxg3 35. Kxg3 Kd6 36. a4 Kd5 37. Ba3 Ke4 38. Bc5 a6 39. b6 f5 40. Kh4 f4 41. exf4 Kxf4 42. Kh5 Kf5 43. Be3 Ke4 44. Bf2 Kf5 45. Bh4 e5 46. Bg5 e4 47. Be3 Kf6 48. Kg4 Ke5 49. Kg5 Kd5 50. Kf5 a5 51. Bf2 g5 52. Kxg5 Kc4 53. Kf5 Kb4 54. Kxe4 Kxa4 55. Kd5 Kb5 56. Kd6 1–0

The game was played in two days. Spassky adjourned the game on his 41st move, but they had not reached the official adjournment time of five hours, so he took a loss of 35 minutes on his clock. The game continued the next day, and "Fischer left the playing table for half an hour to protest the presence of the television cameras. Then he resigned on move 56. He told his second Lombardy that he had played too quickly because the cameras distracted him".

The first game had 2,300 spectators.

=== Game 2: Fischer forfeits ===
After the first game the match organizers removed the "towers" and the backstage camera, and "they've found a great new place for the cameras–completely invisible and inaudible." Fischer wasn't satisfied with the partial changes, saying he wanted "all cameras out" and refused to proceed to the hall. At the starting time of the game, the match chief arbiter Lothar Schmid walked onto the stage and started Fischer's clock. The challenger had 60 minutes to make his first move before the game resulted in a forfeit. Fischer didn't appear. At that time, Fischer told Icelandic Chess Federation President Guðmundur G. Thórarinsson: "They forfeit me, that's it. I'm taking the next plane back home". Thirty minutes into the game, Chester Fox agreed to remove cameras for one game, "pending further discussion". When Fischer heard about it, he demanded to set the clock back to its original time. Schmid refused. Friðrik Ólafsson, an Icelandic grandmaster and Fischer's friend, intervened 12 minutes before the forfeit, but Fischer continued to insist on his demands, telling Ólafsson: "talk to me about everything but the match. I lost interest in it six months ago." Ólafsson said Fischer that day was "not very coherent. He was quite upset and he said he thought that there was a conspiracy against him by the Icelandic Chess Federation, which he believed was a communist front."

At 6 p.m., an hour after the game began, Schmid stepped up to the playing table and stopped the clock, announcing that since Fischer had not appeared in the playing hall, according to rule five of the Amsterdam Agreement, he lost the game by forfeit. Fischer formally protested the forfeit, supported by FIDE Delegate Fred Cramer, writing Schmid a letter explaining that he had been absent because of the playing hall's poor conditions (particularly the noise and distraction of the video and photo recording). He acknowledged that he had agreed to the recording, aware that the organizers were informed about his conditions and "assured by all parties concerned that modern technology had progressed to such an extent that they could photograph him without the least disturbance". Fischer delivered the letter in the early hours of July 14 to Schmid's hotel room, and the match committee overruled Fischer's protest; based on FIDE regulations he could protest a game no later than six hours after it ended.

Karpov speculated that this forfeited game was actually a masterstroke on Fischer's part, designed to upset Spassky's equanimity.

With the score now 2–0 in Spassky's favor, many observers believed the match was over and Fischer would leave Iceland. Indeed, Fischer looked to board the next plane out, but was dissuaded by Lombardy. (Note: "Fischer lodged a formal protest [over the second-game-forfeit] less than six hours after the forfeiture. It was overruled by the match committee... Everyone knew that Fischer wouldn't accept it lightly. And he didn't. His instant reaction was to make a reservation to fly home immediately. He was dissuaded by Lombardy, but it seemed likely that he'd refuse to continue the match unless the forfeit was removed.") Some attributed his decision to stay in the match to another phone call from Kissinger and a deluge of cablegrams. Spassky agreed to play the third game in a small room backstage, out of sight of spectators. According to Pal Benko and Burt Hochberg, this concession was a psychological mistake by Spassky. (Note: Benko and Hochberg write that it "had a costly psychological effect on Spassky". Benko and Hochberg also quote Spassky as saying after the match, "My acceding to Fischer's groundless demand to play in a closed room was a big psychological mistake.")

=== Game 3: Spassky–Fischer, 0–1 (Modern Benoni) ===
Spassky–Fischer, game 3

Position: a8 black rook, c8 black bishop, d8 black queen, e8 black rook, g8 black king, a7 black pawn, b7 black pawn, d7 black knight, f7 black pawn, g7 black bishop, h7 black pawn, d6 black pawn, g6 black pawn, c5 black pawn, d5 white pawn, h5 black knight, e4 white pawn, c3 white knight, a2 white pawn, b2 white pawn, c2 white queen, d2 white knight, e2 white bishop, f2 white pawn, g2 white pawn, h2 white pawn, a1 white rook, c1 white bishop, f1 white rook, g1 white king

Position after Fischer's 11...Nh5!?

July 16. This game proved to be the match's turning point. After 11.Qc2, Fischer demonstrated his understanding of the position with 11...Nh5!?—a seemingly antipositional move allowing White to shatter Black's kingside pawn structure, but Fischer's assessment that his kingside attack created significant counterplay proved correct. Surprised by Fischer's novelty, Spassky did not react in the best way. Instead of 15.Bd2, 15.Ne2!? was possible (Zaitsev), or 15.f3 to prevent ...Ng4. In particular, Spassky's 18th move, weakening the light squares, was a mistake. The game was adjourned, and Spassky resigned the next day upon seeing that Fischer had sealed the best move, 41...Bd3+! It was Fischer's first-ever win against Spassky.

Modern Benoni: Classical Main Line (ECO A77)
1. d4 Nf6 2. c4 e6 3. Nf3 c5 4. d5 exd5 5. cxd5 d6 6. Nc3 g6 7. Nd2 Nbd7 8. e4 Bg7 9. Be2 0-0 10. 0-0 Re8 11. Qc2 Nh5 (diagram) 12. Bxh5 gxh5 13. Nc4 Ne5 14. Ne3 Qh4 15. Bd2 Ng4 16. Nxg4 hxg4 17. Bf4 Qf6 18. g3 Bd7 19. a4 b6 20. Rfe1 a6 21. Re2 b5 22. Rae1 Qg6 23. b3 Re7 24. Qd3 Rb8 25. axb5 axb5 26. b4 c4 27. Qd2 Rbe8 28. Re3 h5 29. R3e2 Kh7 30. Re3 Kg8 31. R3e2 Bxc3 32. Qxc3 Rxe4 33. Rxe4 Rxe4 34. Rxe4 Qxe4 35. Bh6 Qg6 36. Bc1 Qb1 37. Kf1 Bf5 38. Ke2 Qe4+ 39. Qe3 Qc2+ 40. Qd2 Qb3 41. Qd4 Bd3+ 0–1

=== Game 4: Fischer–Spassky, ½–½ (Sicilian Sozin) ===
Fischer–Spassky, game 4

Position: a8 black bishop, f8 black rook, f7 black pawn, g7 black king, e6 black pawn, a5 black pawn, c5 black bishop, e5 black queen, g5 black pawn, c4 white bishop, d4 white knight, g4 white queen, a3 white pawn, h3 white pawn, b2 white pawn, c2 white pawn, g2 white pawn, d1 white rook, h1 white king

Position after 29.Nd4

July 18. The chief arbiter, ensuring the players would proceed to play the third game, appealed to Spassky "as a sportsman" to agree to play in a backstage room without cameras and audience. Spassky agreed, but only for one game. Fischer already booked all three flights that would take him from Reykjavik back to New York City, but was persuaded to "give it [the match] a trial" with newly established conditions.

Fischer, as White, played the Sozin Attack against Spassky's Sicilian Defense. Spassky sacrificed a pawn, and after 17...Bxc5+ had a slight advantage (Nunn). Spassky developed a strong kingside attack, but failed to convert it into a win, the game ending in a draw.

Sicilian Defense: Sozin Attack (ECO B88)
1. e4 c5 2. Nf3 d6 3. d4 cxd4 4. Nxd4 Nf6 5. Nc3 Nc6 6. Bc4 e6 7. Bb3 Be7 8. Be3 0-0 9. 0-0 a6 10. f4 Nxd4 11. Bxd4 b5 12. a3 Bb7 13. Qd3 a5 14. e5 dxe5 15. fxe5 Nd7 16. Nxb5 Nc5 17. Bxc5 Bxc5+ 18. Kh1 Qg5 19. Qe2 Rad8 20. Rad1 Rxd1 21. Rxd1 h5 22. Nd6 Ba8 23. Bc4 h4 24. h3 Be3 25. Qg4 Qxe5 26. Qxh4 g5 27. Qg4 Bc5 28. Nb5 Kg7 29. Nd4 (diagram) Rh8 30. Nf3 Bxf3 31. Qxf3 Bd6 32. Qc3 Qxc3 33. bxc3 Be5 34. Rd7 Kf6 35. Kg1 Bxc3 36. Be2 Be5 37. Kf1 Rc8 38. Bh5 Rc7 39. Rxc7 Bxc7 40. a4 Ke7 41. Ke2 f5 42. Kd3 Be5 43. c4 Kd6 44. Bf7 Bg3 45. c5+ ½–½

=== Game 5: Spassky–Fischer, 0–1 (Nimzo-Indian Hübner) ===
Spassky–Fischer, game 5

Position: f8 black king, g7 black pawn, b6 black pawn, g6 black queen, h6 black pawn, a5 black pawn, c5 black pawn, d5 white pawn, e5 black pawn, g5 black pawn, a4 black bishop, c4 white pawn, e4 white pawn, f4 black knight, c3 white pawn, c2 white queen, g2 white pawn, h2 white pawn, d1 white bishop, e1 white bishop, g1 white king

After Spassky played 27.Qc2??, Fischer responded 27... Bxa4!, the final move.

July 20. Game 5 was another Nimzo-Indian, this time the Hübner Variation: 4.Nf3 c5 5.e3 Nc6 6.Bd3 Bxc3+ 7.bxc3 d6. Fischer rebuffed Spassky's attempt to attack; after 15...0-0 the game was even (Adorján). Fischer obtained a blocked position where Spassky was saddled with weak pawns and his bishop pair had no prospects. After 26 moves, Spassky blundered with 27.Qc2??, and resigned after Fischer's 27...Bxa4!, as shown. After 28.Qxa4 Qxe4, Black's dual threats of 29...Qxg2# and 29...Qxe1# would decide; alternatively, 28.Qd2 (or 28.Qb1) Bxd1 29.Qxd1 Qxe4 30.Qd2 a4 wins.

Nimzo-Indian Defense: Hübner Variation (ECO E41)
1. d4 Nf6 2. c4 e6 3. Nc3 Bb4 4. Nf3 c5 5. e3 Nc6 6. Bd3 Bxc3+ 7. bxc3 d6 8. e4 e5 9. d5 Ne7 10. Nh4 h6 11. f4 Ng6 12. Nxg6 fxg6 13. fxe5 dxe5 14. Be3 b6 15. 0-0 0-0 16. a4 a5 17. Rb1 Bd7 18. Rb2 Rb8 19. Rbf2 Qe7 20. Bc2 g5 21. Bd2 Qe8 22. Be1 Qg6 23. Qd3 Nh5 24. Rxf8+ Rxf8 25. Rxf8+ Kxf8 26. Bd1 Nf4 27. Qc2 Bxa4 (diagram) 0–1

Thus Fischer had drawn level (the score was now 2½–2½), although FIDE rules stipulated that the champion retained the title if after 24 games the match ended in a tie.

After game 5, Fischer hinted to Lombardy about a surprise he had in store for game 6. (Note: "Despite the victory [in game 5], neither Bobby nor I was satisfied with the outcome of his king pawn sally in Game Four. "Don't worry. Sunday I will play something that will make you very happy...")

=== Game 6: Fischer–Spassky, 1–0 (QGD Tartakower) ===
Fischer–Spassky, game 6

Position: c8 black rook, f8 black queen, g8 black king, a7 black rook, d7 black knight, g7 black pawn, a6 black pawn, e6 black pawn, h6 black pawn, c5 black pawn, d5 black pawn, a3 white queen, e3 white pawn, a2 white pawn, b2 white pawn, e2 white bishop, f2 white pawn, g2 white pawn, h2 white pawn, c1 white rook, f1 white rook, g1 white king

Position prior to 20.e4!

July 23. Before the match began, the Soviet team that had been training Spassky debated whether Fischer might play an opening move other than his usual 1.e4. (Note: "Krogius: Of course, we ourselves tried to forecast the direction of the American grandmaster's preparations. I remember that repeated suggestions were made about possible changes in Fischer's style, and in particular his opening repertoire." "But when the question was raised as to whether 1.d4 or 1.c4 could be expected of Fischer, Spassky replied: 'Let's not bother with such nonsense – I'll play the Tartakower [Defence]. What can he achieve?...'")

Fischer played 1.c4 (instead of 1.e4) for the third time in a serious game. (Note: The two prior occasions were at the 1970 Palma de Mallorca Interzonal, when Fischer played 1.c4 against Lev Polugaevsky and Oscar Panno.) With 3.d4 the game transposed into the Queen's Gambit Declined, surprising many who had never seen Fischer play the White side of that opening.

Spassky played Tartakower's Defense (7...b6), his favorite choice in many tournaments and a line with which he had never lost. After 14.Bb5!? (introduced in Furman–Geller, Moscow 1970), Spassky responded with 14...a6?!. Geller had previously shown Spassky 14...Qb7!, the move with which Geller later beat Jan Timman at Hilversum 1973, but Spassky apparently forgot it. (Note: After Furman–Geller, Semyon Furman, Geller, Spassky, and Eduard Gufeld analyzed the game, and "Geller analyzed a plan associated with material sacrifices that would begin with the move 14...Qb7!" Geller was also one of Spassky's seconds for the match, and "during the preparation for the match they studied this position" (after 14.Bb5).) Fischer's 20.e4!—"the key move of the game"—struck at Black's center and left Spassky with no good alternatives. (Note: "20...d4 weakens his light squares. 20...dxe4 21.Rc4 and Black's pawns are all weak and doomed; or 20...Nf6 21.e5 Nd7 (21...Ne4 22.f3) 22.f4.") After Spassky's 20...d4, "the pawns have no hope of further advance and the white bishop is unimpeded." After 21.f4, Fischer had the upper hand (Hort). After 26.f5, White started "steadily gaining momentum".

Queen's Gambit Declined: Tartakower Variation (ECO D59)
1. c4 e6 2. Nf3 d5 3. d4 Nf6 4. Nc3 Be7 5. Bg5 0-0 6. e3 h6 7. Bh4 b6 8. cxd5 Nxd5 9. Bxe7 Qxe7 10. Nxd5 exd5 11. Rc1 Be6 12. Qa4 c5 13. Qa3 Rc8 14. Bb5 a6 15. dxc5 bxc5 16. 0-0 Ra7 17. Be2 Nd7 18. Nd4 Qf8 19. Nxe6 fxe6 (diagram) 20. e4 d4 21. f4 Qe7 22. e5 Rb8 23. Bc4 Kh8 24. Qh3 Nf8 25. b3 a5 26. f5 exf5 27. Rxf5 Nh7 28. Rcf1 Qd8 29. Qg3 Re7 30. h4 Rbb7 31. e6 Rbc7 32. Qe5 Qe8 33. a4 Qd8 34. R1f2 Qe8 35. R2f3 Qd8 36. Bd3 Qe8 37. Qe4 Nf6 38. Rxf6 gxf6 39. Rxf6 Kg8 40. Bc4 Kh8 41. Qf4 1–0

After this game, Spassky joined the audience in applauding Fischer's win. This astounded Fischer, who called his opponent "a true sportsman".

"Lombardy was ecstatic: 'Bobby has played a steady, fluent game, and just watched Spassky make horrendous moves. Spassky has not met a player of Bobby's genius and caliber before, who fights for every piece on the board; he doesn't give in and agree to draws like the Russian grandmasters. This is a shock to Spassky.'"

According to C. H. O'D. Alexander: "This game was notable for two things. First, Fischer played the Queen's Gambit for the first time in his life in a serious game; second, he played it to perfection, the game indeed casting doubt on Black's whole opening system."

The win gave Fischer the lead (3½–2½) for the first time in the match.

=== Game 7: Spassky–Fischer, ½–½ (Sicilian Najdorf) ===
Spassky–Fischer, game 7

Position: h8 black rook, b6 black pawn, f6 black pawn, f5 white knight, h5 black pawn, a4 white pawn, c4 black knight, d4 white rook, e4 white rook, g4 black pawn, h4 white pawn, f3 black king, c2 black rook, g1 white king

Final position after 49.Kg1

July 25. Spassky played 1.e4 for the first time in the match. Fischer defended aggressively with his favorite Poisoned Pawn Variation of the Najdorf Sicilian, and after 17...Nc6 had the upper hand (Gipslis). He consolidated his extra pawn and reached a winning endgame, but then played carelessly, allowing Spassky to salvage a draw. In the final position, Fischer had two extra pawns but had to execute a draw by perpetual check in order to escape being checkmated by Spassky's two rooks and knight.

Sicilian Defense: Najdorf Variation, Poisoned Pawn Variation (ECO B97)
1. e4 c5 2. Nf3 d6 3. d4 cxd4 4. Nxd4 Nf6 5. Nc3 a6 6. Bg5 e6 7. f4 Qb6 8. Qd2 Qxb2 9. Nb3 Qa3 10. Bd3 Be7 11. 0-0 h6 12. Bh4 Nxe4 13. Nxe4 Bxh4 14. f5 exf5 15. Bb5+ axb5 16. Nxd6+ Kf8 17. Nxc8 Nc6 18. Nd6 Rd8 19. Nxb5 Qe7 20. Qf4 g6 21. a4 Bg5 22. Qc4 Be3+ 23. Kh1 f4 24. g3 g5 25. Rae1 Qb4 26. Qxb4+ Nxb4 27. Re2 Kg7 28. Na5 b6 29. Nc4 Nd5 30. Ncd6 Bc5 31. Nb7 Rc8 32. c4 Ne3 33. Rf3 Nxc4 34. gxf4 g4 35. Rd3 h5 36. h3 Na5 37. N7d6 Bxd6 38. Nxd6 Rc1+ 39. Kg2 Nc4 40. Ne8+ Kg6 41. h4 f6 42. Re6 Rc2+ 43. Kg1 Kf5 44. Ng7+ Kxf4 45. Rd4+ Kg3 46. Nf5+ Kf3 47. Ree4 Rc1+ 48. Kh2 Rc2+ 49. Kg1 (diagram) ½–½

=== Game 8: Fischer–Spassky, 1–0 (English Symmetrical) ===
Fischer–Spassky, game 8

Position: b8 black rook, g8 black king, e7 black pawn, f7 black pawn, g7 black bishop, h7 black pawn, a6 black pawn, d6 black pawn, f6 black knight, g6 black pawn, a5 black queen, c4 black bishop, c3 white knight, g3 white pawn, a2 white pawn, d2 white queen, e2 white pawn, f2 white pawn, g2 white bishop, h2 white pawn, c1 white rook, d1 white rook, g1 white king

Position prior to Spassky's 19...Nd7??

July 27. Fischer again played 1.c4 (an English Opening), soon transposing to another opening similar to game 6. After 14...a6 the game was even. Spassky sacrificed an exchange, playing 15...b5? "under dubious conditions" and giving up his rook for White's bishop. After Spassky made his 19th move, Nd7, his position further deteriorated—"a terrible mistake which allowed White to win back his pawn, leaving Black with a completely lost position". Fischer won, putting him ahead 5–3.

English Opening: Symmetrical Defense (ECO A39)
1. c4 c5 2. Nc3 Nc6 3. Nf3 Nf6 4. g3 g6 5. Bg2 Bg7 6. 0-0 0-0 7. d4 cxd4 8. Nxd4 Nxd4 9. Qxd4 d6 10. Bg5 Be6 11. Qf4 Qa5 12. Rac1 Rab8 13. b3 Rfc8 14. Qd2 a6 15. Be3 b5 16. Ba7 bxc4 17. Bxb8 Rxb8 18. bxc4 Bxc4 19. Rfd1 (diagram) Nd7 20. Nd5 Qxd2 21. Nxe7+ Kf8 22. Rxd2 Kxe7 23. Rxc4 Rb1+ 24. Bf1 Nc5 25. Kg2 a5 26. e4 Ba1 27. f4 f6 28. Re2 Ke6 29. Rec2 Bb2 30. Be2 h5 31. Rd2 Ba3 32. f5+ gxf5 33. exf5+ Ke5 34. Rcd4 Kxf5 35. Rd5+ Ke6 36. Rxd6+ Ke7 37. Rc6 1–0

=== Game 9: Spassky–Fischer, ½–½ (QGD Semi-Tarrasch) ===
Spassky–Fischer, game 9

Position: a8 black rook, c8 black bishop, d8 black queen, e8 black king, f8 black bishop, h8 black rook, a7 black pawn, f7 black pawn, g7 black pawn, h7 black pawn, c6 black knight, e6 black pawn, b5 black pawn, c4 white bishop, d4 white pawn, e4 white pawn, f3 white knight, a2 white pawn, f2 white pawn, g2 white pawn, h2 white pawn, a1 white rook, c1 white bishop, d1 white queen, e1 white king, h1 white rook

Position after Fischer's novelty 9...b5!

August 1. After game 8 Spassky took time off, citing an illness, which delayed game 9 by two days. The opening transposed to the Semi-Tarrasch Defense of the Queen's Gambit Declined. Fischer then played the theoretical novelty 9...b5!. After 13...0-0 the game was even (Parma). Several exchanges followed, as the game proceeded to a quiet draw after just 29 moves.

Queen's Gambit Declined: Semi-Tarrasch Defense, Exchange Variation (ECO D41)
1. d4 Nf6 2. c4 e6 3. Nf3 d5 4. Nc3 c5 5. cxd5 Nxd5 6. e4 Nxc3 7. bxc3 cxd4 8. cxd4 Nc6 9. Bc4 b5 (diagram) 10. Bd3 Bb4+ 11. Bd2 Bxd2+ 12. Qxd2 a6 13. a4 0–0 14. Qc3 Bb7 15. axb5 axb5 16. 0-0 Qb6 17. Rab1 b4 18. Qd2 Nxd4 19. Nxd4 Qxd4 20. Rxb4 Qd7 21. Qe3 Rfd8 22. Rfb1 Qxd3 23. Qxd3 Rxd3 24. Rxb7 g5 25. Rb8+ Rxb8 26. Rxb8+ Kg7 27. f3 Rd2 28. h4 h6 29. hxg5 hxg5 ½–½

=== Game 10: Fischer–Spassky, 1–0 (Ruy Lopez Breyer) ===
Fischer–Spassky, game 10

Position: a8 black rook, d8 black rook, f8 black bishop, g8 black king, b7 black bishop, f7 black pawn, g7 black pawn, h7 black pawn, a6 black pawn, a5 black queen, b5 white pawn, c5 black pawn, e4 white pawn, b3 white bishop, f3 white knight, h3 white pawn, f2 white pawn, g2 white pawn, b1 white rook, c1 white queen, e1 white rook, g1 white king

Position after 25...Qxa5?! 26.Bb3!

August 3. Fischer played the Ruy Lopez, an opening on which he was considered an expert. After a balanced opening, Spassky's 25...Qxa5?! gave Fischer the upper hand (25...axb5!? 26.Rxb5 Ba6 gives Spassky a better chance; Gligorić). Fischer responded by initiating a dangerous attack on Spassky's king with 26.Bb3! (Matanović), suddenly placing Black in a critical situation. Spassky sacrificed the exchange for a pawn, reaching a sharp endgame where his two connected passed pawns gave almost sufficient compensation for Fischer's small material advantage. Spassky then had chances to draw, but played inexactly, and Fischer won the game with precise play.

Ruy Lopez: Breyer Variation (ECO C95)
1. e4 e5 2. Nf3 Nc6 3. Bb5 a6 4. Ba4 Nf6 5. 0-0 Be7 6. Re1 b5 7. Bb3 d6 8. c3 0-0 9. h3 Nb8 10. d4 Nbd7 11. Nbd2 Bb7 12. Bc2 Re8 13. b4 Bf8 14. a4 Nb6 15. a5 Nbd7 16. Bb2 Qb8 17. Rb1 c5 18. bxc5 dxc5 19. dxe5 Nxe5 20. Nxe5 Qxe5 21. c4 Qf4 22. Bxf6 Qxf6 23. cxb5 Red8 24. Qc1 Qc3 25. Nf3 Qxa5 26. Bb3 (diagram) axb5 27. Qf4 Rd7 28. Ne5 Qc7 29. Rbd1 Re7 30. Bxf7+ Rxf7 31. Qxf7+ Qxf7 32. Nxf7 Bxe4 33. Rxe4 Kxf7 34. Rd7+ Kf6 35. Rb7 Ra1+ 36. Kh2 Bd6+ 37. g3 b4 38. Kg2 h5 39. Rb6 Rd1 40. Kf3 Kf7 41. Ke2 Rd5 42. f4 g6 43. g4 hxg4 44. hxg4 g5 45. f5 Be5 46. Rb5 Kf6 47. Rexb4 Bd4 48. Rb6+ Ke5 49. Kf3 Rd8 50. Rb8 Rd7 51. R4b7 Rd6 52. Rb6 Rd7 53. Rg6 Kd5 54. Rxg5 Be5 55. f6 Kd4 56. Rb1 1–0

=== Game 11: Spassky–Fischer, 1–0 (Sicilian Najdorf) ===
Spassky–Fischer, game 11

Position: a8 black rook, e8 black king, f8 black bishop, h8 black rook, b7 black pawn, d7 black bishop, f7 black pawn, a6 black pawn, c6 black knight, d6 black pawn, e6 black pawn, f6 black pawn, h5 black pawn, e4 white pawn, f4 white pawn, a3 black queen, b3 white knight, a2 white pawn, c2 white pawn, d2 white queen, e2 white bishop, g2 white pawn, h2 white pawn, a1 white rook, b1 white knight, f1 white rook, h1 white king

Position after Spassky's extraordinary 14.Nb1!!

August 6. As in game 7, game 11 opened with the Sicilian Najdorf and Fischer played his favorite Poisoned Pawn Variation. Spassky responded with the startling 14.Nb1 (given !! by many annotators at the time), retreating his knight to its starting position. Although later analysis showed that the game would maintain equality if Black responded correctly, Fischer was unprepared for the move and did not find the optimal reply. If Fischer had instead played 15...Ne7!? then 16.N1d2!? and the game is unclear (Gipslis). After inferior defense by Fischer, Spassky trapped Fischer's queen to reach a winning position, at which point Fischer resigned. It was Spassky's first win since games 1 and 2; it was the only time in Fischer's career that he lost using the Poisoned Pawn variation in a competitive game.

Sicilian Defense: Najdorf Variation, Poisoned Pawn Variation (ECO B97)
1. e4 c5 2. Nf3 d6 3. d4 cxd4 4. Nxd4 Nf6 5. Nc3 a6 6. Bg5 e6 7. f4 Qb6 8. Qd2 Qxb2 9. Nb3 Qa3 10. Bxf6 gxf6 11. Be2 h5 12. 0-0 Nc6 13. Kh1 Bd7 14. Nb1 (diagram) Qb4 15. Qe3 d5 16. exd5 Ne7 17. c4 Nf5 18. Qd3 h4 19. Bg4 Nd6 20. N1d2 f5 21. a3 Qb6 22. c5 Qb5 23. Qc3 fxg4 24. a4 h3 25. axb5 hxg2+ 26. Kxg2 Rh3 27. Qf6 Nf5 28. c6 Bc8 29. dxe6 fxe6 30. Rfe1 Be7 31. Rxe6 1–0

=== Game 12: Fischer–Spassky, ½–½ (QGD Neo-orthodox) ===
Fischer–Spassky, game 12

Position: a8 black rook, b8 black queen, f8 black rook, g8 black king, b7 black bishop, d7 black knight, f7 black pawn, g7 black pawn, a6 black pawn, e6 black pawn, f6 black knight, h6 black pawn, b4 black bishop, d4 white knight, e4 white bishop, h4 white bishop, c3 white knight, e3 white pawn, b2 white pawn, f2 white pawn, g2 white pawn, h2 white pawn, c1 white rook, d1 white queen, f1 white rook, g1 white king

Position after 19.Be4! Qb8!

August 8. As in game 6, Fischer's opening 1. c4 transposed into the Queen's Gambit Declined. A quiet game followed. After 19.Be4!, analysts gave Fischer a slight advantage (Yudovich), but by 24...a5 the game was even again (Polugaevsky). Neither player found an advantage, and after 55 moves they reached an opposite-colored bishops endgame. Although Spassky had an extra pawn (four to Fischer's three), they could not make progress, and agreed to a draw.

Queen's Gambit Declined: Neo-orthodox Variation (ECO D66)
1. c4 e6 2. Nf3 d5 3. d4 Nf6 4. Nc3 Be7 5. Bg5 h6 6. Bh4 0-0 7. e3 Nbd7 8. Rc1 c6 9. Bd3 dxc4 10. Bxc4 b5 11. Bd3 a6 12. a4 bxa4 13. Nxa4 Qa5+ 14. Nd2 Bb4 15. Nc3 c5 16. Nb3 Qd8 17. 0-0 cxd4 18. Nxd4 Bb7 19. Be4 Qb8 (diagram) 20. Bg3 Qa7 21. Nc6 Bxc6 22. Bxc6 Rac8 23. Na4 Rfd8 24. Bf3 a5 25. Rc6 Rxc6 26. Bxc6 Rc8 27. Bf3 Qa6 28. h3 Qb5 29. Be2 Qc6 30. Bf3 Qb5 31. b3 Be7 32. Be2 Qb4 33. Ba6 Rc6 34. Bd3 Nc5 35. Qf3 Rc8 36. Nxc5 Bxc5 37. Rc1 Rd8 38. Bc4 Qd2 39. Rf1 Bb4 40. Bc7 Rd7 41. Qc6 Qc2 42. Be5 Rd2 43. Qa8+ Kh7 44. Bxf6 gxf6 45. Qf3 f5 46. g4 Qe4 47. Kg2 Kg6 48. Rc1 Ba3 49. Ra1 Bb4 50. Rc1 Be7 51. gxf5+ exf5 52. Re1 Rxf2+ 53. Kxf2 Bh4+ 54. Ke2 Qxf3+ 55. Kxf3 Bxe1 ½–½

=== Game 13: Spassky–Fischer, 0–1 (Alekhine's Defense Modern) ===
Spassky–Fischer, game 13

Position: f8 white bishop, g8 black rook, g7 white pawn, b5 black king, f5 black pawn, b4 black pawn, c4 black pawn, h3 black pawn, a2 black pawn, d2 white king, a1 white rook

Position after 61.Bf8

August 10. Fischer avoided the Sicilian Defense, with which he had lost game 11, opting for Alekhine's Defense. After 8...a5! 9.a4? (9.c3!? and Black is only slightly better; Gligorić) dxe5 10.dxe5 Na6! 11.0-0 Nc5, Fischer had the upper hand (Bagirov). The game swung one way, then another, and was finally adjourned at move 42 with Fischer having an edge in a sharp position but no clear win. The Soviet team's analysis convinced them that the position was drawn. Fischer stayed up until 8 a.m. analyzing it (the resumption being at 2:30 p.m.). He had not found a win either, but managed to win a complicated pawns-versus-rook endgame after Spassky missed a relatively simple draw with 69.Rc3+. Spassky's seconds were stunned, and Spassky refused to leave the board for a long time after the game was over, unable to believe the result. He remarked, "It is very strange. How can one lose with the opponent's only rook locked in completely at g8?"

Lombardy noted the shock that Spassky was in after he resigned:

While Fischer dashed for his car, Spassky remained glued to his seat. A sympathetic Lothar Schmid came over, and the two shifted the pieces about with Boris demonstrating his careless mistakes. The two were left wondering how Bobby could have squeezed a win from a position which a night of competent analysis by a renowned Soviet team had showed to be a guaranteed draw.

Former World Champion Mikhail Botvinnik said this game made a particularly strong impression on him. He called it "the highest creative achievement of Fischer". He resolved a drawish opposite-colored bishops endgame by sacrificing his bishop and trapping his own rook. "Then five passed pawns struggled with the white rook. Nothing similar had been seen before in chess".

David Bronstein said, "Of all the games from the match, the 13th appeals to me most of all. When I play through the game I still cannot grasp the innermost motive behind this or that plan or even individual move. Like an enigma, it still teases my imagination."

Alekhine's Defense: Modern Variation, Alburt Variation (ECO B04)
1. e4 Nf6 2. e5 Nd5 3. d4 d6 4. Nf3 g6 5. Bc4 Nb6 6. Bb3 Bg7 7. Nbd2 0-0 8. h3 a5 9. a4 dxe5 10. dxe5 Na6 11. 0-0 Nc5 12. Qe2 Qe8 13. Ne4 Nbxa4 14. Bxa4 Nxa4 15. Re1 Nb6 16. Bd2 a4 17. Bg5 h6 18. Bh4 Bf5 19. g4 Be6 20. Nd4 Bc4 21. Qd2 Qd7 22. Rad1 Rfe8 23. f4 Bd5 24. Nc5 Qc8 25. Qc3 e6 26. Kh2 Nd7 27. Nd3 c5 28. Nb5 Qc6 29. Nd6 Qxd6 30. exd6 Bxc3 31. bxc3 f6 32. g5 hxg5 33. fxg5 f5 34. Bg3 Kf7 35. Ne5+ Nxe5 36. Bxe5 b5 37. Rf1 Rh8 38. Bf6 a3 39. Rf4 a2 40. c4 Bxc4 41. d7 Bd5 42. Kg3 Ra3+ 43. c3 Rha8 44. Rh4 e5 45. Rh7+ Ke6 46. Re7+ Kd6 47. Rxe5 Rxc3+ 48. Kf2 Rc2+ 49. Ke1 Kxd7 50. Rexd5+ Kc6 51. Rd6+ Kb7 52. Rd7+ Ka6 53. R7d2 Rxd2 54. Kxd2 b4 55. h4 Kb5 56. h5 c4 57. Ra1 gxh5 58. g6 h4 59. g7 h3 60. Be7 Rg8 61. Bf8 (diagram) h2 62. Kc2 Kc6 63. Rd1 b3+ 64. Kc3 h1=Q 65. Rxh1 Kd5 66. Kb2 f4 67. Rd1+ Ke4 68. Rc1 Kd3 69. Rd1+ Ke2 70. Rc1 f3 71. Bc5 Rxg7 72. Rxc4 Rd7 73. Re4+ Kf1 74. Bd4 f2 0–1

When Spassky and Fischer shook hands, many in the audience thought they had agreed to a draw, thinking that 75.Rf4 draws. But 75...Rxd4! 76.Rxd4 Ke2 wins; 75.Be5 Rd1 76.Kxb3 Re1 also wins for Black.

The next seven games (games 14 through 20) were drawn. Spassky chose safe lines that Fischer was unable to break, and Fischer was unable to increase his 3-point lead.

The off-the-board antics continued, including a lawsuit against Fischer for damages by Chester Fox, who had filming rights to the match (Fischer had objected to what he said were noticeable camera noises, and the Icelandic hosts had reluctantly removed the television cameras; they were to share the film revenues with the two contestants), a Fischer demand to remove the first seven rows of spectators (eventually, three rows were cleared), and Soviet claims that Fischer was using chemicals and electronic devices to "influence" Spassky, resulting in an inconclusive Icelandic police sweep of the hall.

=== Game 14: Fischer–Spassky, ½–½ (QGD Harrwitz) ===
Fischer–Spassky, game 14

Position: f8 black rook, g8 black king, a7 black pawn, b7 black pawn, f7 black pawn, g7 black pawn, b6 black bishop, c6 black knight, f6 black queen, h6 black pawn, d5 black pawn, a4 white queen, e4 black knight, f4 white bishop, a3 white pawn, e3 white pawn, f3 white knight, b2 white pawn, e2 white bishop, f2 white pawn, g2 white pawn, h2 white pawn, f1 white rook, g1 white king

Position prior to Fischer's 21.Bb5?

August 15. The game was postponed at Spassky's request. Fischer was again White in a Queen's Gambit Declined. After 18.Be5? (18.Nxb6 Qxb6 19.Be5 and Fischer keeps a slight advantage; Gligorić) Bxa4! 19.Qxa4 Nc6! Spassky had the upper hand (Karpov). Fischer blundered a pawn on move 21, but Spassky blundered it back on move 27, and the game settled into a 40-move draw.

Queen's Gambit Declined: Harrwitz Attack (ECO D37)
1. c4 e6 2. Nf3 d5 3. d4 Nf6 4. Nc3 Be7 5. Bf4 0-0 6. e3 c5 7. dxc5 Nc6 8. cxd5 exd5 9. Be2 Bxc5 10. 0-0 Be6 11. Rc1 Rc8 12. a3 h6 13. Bg3 Bb6 14. Ne5 Ne7 15. Na4 Ne4 16. Rxc8 Bxc8 17. Nf3 Bd7 18. Be5 Bxa4 19. Qxa4 Nc6 20. Bf4 Qf6 (diagram) 21. Bb5 Qxb2 22. Bxc6 Nc3 23. Qb4 Qxb4 24. axb4 bxc6 25. Be5 Nb5 26. Rc1 Rc8 27. Nd4 f6 28. Bxf6 Bxd4 29. Bxd4 Nxd4 30. exd4 Rb8 31. Kf1 Rxb4 32. Rxc6 Rxd4 33. Ra6 Kf7 34. Rxa7+ Kf6 35. Rd7 h5 36. Ke2 g5 37. Ke3 Re4+ 38. Kd3 Ke6 39. Rg7 Kf6 40. Rd7 Ke6 ½–½

=== Game 15: Spassky–Fischer, ½–½ (Sicilian Najdorf) ===
Spassky–Fischer, game 15

Position: d8 black rook, a7 black king, b7 black bishop, g7 white queen, a6 black pawn, e6 black pawn, g5 white knight, a4 white pawn, a3 white king, c3 white pawn, g3 white pawn, b2 white rook, h2 white pawn, a1 black queen

Final position after 43...Qa1+

August 17. Fischer returned to the Najdorf Sicilian, but played the main line rather than the Poisoned Pawn Variation with which he had lost game 11. At move 13, Fischer sacrificed a pawn for counterplay, which Spassky accepted. After 19.c3, Spassky had the upper hand (Gipslis). After 28...Rd7 the game was even, but when Spassky took a second pawn with 29.Qxh5?! it allowed Fischer a very strong attack. Spassky, on the brink of disaster, "found miraculous replies while in time pressure" and Fischer was only able to achieve a draw by threefold repetition after 43 moves. Two years later, Yugoslav grandmaster Dragoljub Velimirović improved on Spassky's play with the piece sacrifice 13.Bxb5!?, winning a crushing victory in Velimirović–Al Kazzaz, Nice Olympiad 1974. Black in turn later improved on Fischer's 12...0-0-0 with 12...b4.

Sicilian Defense: Najdorf Variation, Classical Main line (ECO B99)
1. e4 c5 2. Nf3 d6 3. d4 cxd4 4. Nxd4 Nf6 5. Nc3 a6 6. Bg5 e6 7. f4 Be7 8. Qf3 Qc7 9. 0-0-0 Nbd7 10. Bd3 b5 11. Rhe1 Bb7 12. Qg3 0-0-0 13. Bxf6 Nxf6 14. Qxg7 Rdf8 15. Qg3 b4 16. Na4 Rhg8 17. Qf2 Nd7 18. Kb1 Kb8 19. c3 Nc5 20. Bc2 bxc3 21. Nxc3 Bf6 22. g3 h5 23. e5 dxe5 24. fxe5 Bh8 25. Nf3 Rd8 26. Rxd8+ Rxd8 27. Ng5 Bxe5 28. Qxf7 Rd7 29. Qxh5 Bxc3 30. bxc3 Qb6+ 31. Kc1 Qa5 32. Qh8+ Ka7 33. a4 Nd3+ 34. Bxd3 Rxd3 35. Kc2 Rd5 36. Re4 Rd8 37. Qg7 Qf5 38. Kb3 Qd5+ 39. Ka3 Qd2 40. Rb4 Qc1+ 41. Rb2 Qa1+ 42. Ra2 Qc1+ 43. Rb2 Qa1+ (diagram) ½–½

=== Game 16: Fischer–Spassky, ½–½ (Ruy Lopez Exchange) ===
Fischer–Spassky, game 16

Position: c7 black pawn, f7 black king, g7 black pawn, h7 black pawn, a6 black pawn, c6 black pawn, e5 black bishop, c4 black pawn, e4 black rook, e3 white bishop, g3 white pawn, a2 white pawn, b2 black rook, c2 white rook, d2 white rook, f2 white pawn, g2 white king, h2 white pawn

Position after 22...Rxb2!

August 20. Fischer played the Exchange Variation of the Ruy Lopez, a favorite line of his. After 17...Rfe8 the game was equal (Gipslis). Spassky defended well, and after a tactical flurry in the endgame, ended up with the nominal advantage of an extra pawn in a rook ending known to be an easy book draw. Although a draw could have been agreed after move 34, Spassky "used his symbolic material advantage for a little psychological torture", prolonging the game until move 60 before agreeing to a draw.

Ruy Lopez: Exchange Variation (ECO C69)
1. e4 e5 2. Nf3 Nc6 3. Bb5 a6 4. Bxc6 dxc6 5. 0-0 f6 6. d4 Bg4 7. dxe5 Qxd1 8. Rxd1 fxe5 9. Rd3 Bd6 10. Nbd2 Nf6 11. Nc4 Nxe4 12. Ncxe5 Bxf3 13. Nxf3 0-0 14. Be3 b5 15. c4 Rab8 16. Rc1 bxc4 17. Rd4 Rfe8 18. Nd2 Nxd2 19. Rxd2 Re4 20. g3 Be5 21. Rcc2 Kf7 22. Kg2 Rxb2 (diagram) 23. Kf3 c3 24. Kxe4 cxd2 25. Rxd2 Rb5 26. Rc2 Bd6 27. Rxc6 Ra5 28. Bf4 Ra4+ 29. Kf3 Ra3+ 30. Ke4 Rxa2 31. Bxd6 cxd6 32. Rxd6 Rxf2 33. Rxa6 Rxh2 34. Kf3 Rd2 35. Ra7+ Kf6 36. Ra6+ Ke7 37. Ra7+ Rd7 38. Ra2 Ke6 39. Kg2 Re7 40. Kh3 Kf6 41. Ra6+ Re6 42. Ra5 h6 43. Ra2 Kf5 44. Rf2+ Kg5 45. Rf7 g6 46. Rf4 h5 47. Rf3 Rf6 48. Ra3 Re6 49. Rf3 Re4 50. Ra3 Kh6 51. Ra6 Re5 52. Kh4 Re4+ 53. Kh3 Re7 54. Kh4 Re5 55. Rb6 Kg7 56. Rb4 Kh6 57. Rb6 Re1 58. Kh3 Rh1+ 59. Kg2 Ra1 60. Kh3 Ra4 ½–½

=== Game 17: Spassky–Fischer, ½–½ (Pirc Defense) ===
Spassky–Fischer, game 17

Position: a8 black rook, f8 black rook, g8 black king, a7 black pawn, b7 black pawn, e7 black pawn, f7 black pawn, h7 black pawn, c6 black knight, d6 black pawn, f6 black knight, g6 black pawn, f5 white pawn, e4 white pawn, g4 black bishop, b3 white bishop, c3 black queen, e3 white bishop, f3 white knight, a2 white pawn, c2 white pawn, e2 white queen, g2 white pawn, h2 white pawn, d1 white rook, f1 white rook, g1 white king

Position after 15.f5! Nf6!

August 22. Fischer played the Pirc Defense for the first time in his career. After 18...Qc7 the game was unclear (Parma). The game ended in a draw by the threefold repetition rule.

Pirc Defense: Austrian Attack (ECO B09)
1. e4 d6 2. d4 g6 3. Nc3 Nf6 4. f4 Bg7 5. Nf3 c5 6. dxc5 Qa5 7. Bd3 Qxc5 8. Qe2 0-0 9. Be3 Qa5 10. 0-0 Bg4 11. Rad1 Nc6 12. Bc4 Nh5 13. Bb3 Bxc3 14. bxc3 Qxc3 15. f5 Nf6 (diagram) 16. h3 Bxf3 17. Qxf3 Na5 18. Rd3 Qc7 19. Bh6 Nxb3 20. cxb3 Qc5+ 21. Kh1 Qe5 22. Bxf8 Rxf8 23. Re3 Rc8 24. fxg6 hxg6 25. Qf4 Qxf4 26. Rxf4 Nd7 27. Rf2 Ne5 28. Kh2 Rc1 29. Ree2 Nc6 30. Rc2 Re1 31. Rfe2 Ra1 32. Kg3 Kg7 33. Rcd2 Rf1 34. Rf2 Re1 35. Rfe2 Rf1 36. Re3 a6 37. Rc3 Re1 38. Rc4 Rf1 39. Rdc2 Ra1 40. Rf2 Re1 41. Rfc2 g5 42. Rc1 Re2 43. R1c2 Re1 44. Rc1 Re2 45. R1c2 ½–½

=== Game 18: Fischer–Spassky, ½–½ (Sicilian Rauzer) ===
Fischer–Spassky, game 18

Position: b8 black rook, c7 black king, d7 black bishop, e7 black bishop, d6 black pawn, e6 black pawn, f6 black pawn, a5 black rook, h5 black pawn, a4 black pawn, c4 black queen, d4 white knight, e4 white pawn, a3 white pawn, b3 black pawn, c3 white pawn, d3 white knight, g3 white pawn, b2 white pawn, e2 white queen, f2 white rook, h2 white pawn, a1 white king, e1 white rook

Position after 31.Rf2

August 24. The game opened with a Richter–Rauzer Attack. After 19...Ne5 the game was equal (Matanović, Ugrinović). Like game 17, the game ended in a draw by threefold repetition.

Sicilian Defense: Richter–Rauzer Attack (ECO B69)
1. e4 c5 2. Nf3 d6 3. Nc3 Nc6 4. d4 cxd4 5. Nxd4 Nf6 6. Bg5 e6 7. Qd2 a6 8. 0-0-0 Bd7 9. f4 Be7 10. Nf3 b5 11. Bxf6 gxf6 12. Bd3 Qa5 13. Kb1 b4 14. Ne2 Qc5 15. f5 a5 16. Nf4 a4 17. Rc1 Rb8 18. c3 b3 19. a3 Ne5 20. Rhf1 Nc4 21. Bxc4 Qxc4 22. Rce1 Kd8 23. Ka1 Rb5 24. Nd4 Ra5 25. Nd3 Kc7 26. Nb4 h5 27. g3 Re5 28. Nd3 Rb8 29. Qe2 Ra5 30. fxe6 fxe6 31. Rf2 (diagram) e5 32. Nf5 Bxf5 33. Rxf5 d5 34. exd5 Qxd5 35. Nb4 Qd7 36. Rxh5 Bxb4 37. cxb4 Rd5 38. Rc1+ Kb7 39. Qe4 Rc8 40. Rb1 Kb6 41. Rh7 Rd4 42. Qg6 Qc6 43. Rf7 Rd6 44. Qh6 Qf3 45. Qh7 Qc6 46. Qh6 Qf3 47. Qh7 Qc6 ½–½

=== Game 19: Spassky–Fischer, ½–½ (Alekhine's Defense) ===
Spassky–Fischer, game 19

Position: a8 black rook, b8 black knight, f8 black rook, g8 black king, a7 black pawn, f7 black pawn, g7 black pawn, h7 black pawn, c6 black pawn, e6 black pawn, a5 black queen, c5 white pawn, d5 white knight, e5 white pawn, g5 black bishop, d4 white pawn, e4 white pawn, f3 white bishop, h3 white pawn, a2 white pawn, g2 white pawn, a1 white rook, d1 white queen, f1 white rook, g1 white king

Position after 18.Nxd5! Bg5!

August 27. The second Alekhine's Defense of the match, the game ended in a draw after 40 moves. After 18...Bg5!, Gligorić commented "a queer situation has arisen with many tactical possibilities for both sides." After 19.Bh5 the position was unclear (Bagirov). After 37...a6, C.H.O'D. Alexander wrote: "A miracle; after all the excitements – two piece sacrifices by White and the counter-sacrifice of a rook by Black – the players have reached a completely equal endgame with no chances for either side."

Alekhine's Defense: Modern Variation (ECO B05)
1. e4 Nf6 2. e5 Nd5 3. d4 d6 4. Nf3 Bg4 5. Be2 e6 6. 0-0 Be7 7. h3 Bh5 8. c4 Nb6 9. Nc3 0-0 10. Be3 d5 11. c5 Bxf3 12. Bxf3 Nc4 13. b3 Nxe3 14. fxe3 b6 15. e4 c6 16. b4 bxc5 17. bxc5 Qa5 18. Nxd5 Bg5 (diagram) 19. Bh5 cxd5 20. Bxf7+ Rxf7 21. Rxf7 Qd2 22. Qxd2 Bxd2 23. Raf1 Nc6 24. exd5 exd5 25. Rd7 Be3+ 26. Kh1 Bxd4 27. e6 Be5 28. Rxd5 Re8 29. Re1 Rxe6 30. Rd6 Kf7 31. Rxc6 Rxc6 32. Rxe5 Kf6 33. Rd5 Ke6 34. Rh5 h6 35. Kh2 Ra6 36. c6 Rxc6 37. Ra5 a6 38. Kg3 Kf6 39. Kf3 Rc3+ 40. Kf2 Rc2+ ½–½

=== Game 20: Fischer–Spassky, ½–½ (Sicilian Rauzer) ===
Fischer–Spassky, game 20

Position: d6 black king, g6 black bishop, b5 black pawn, e5 black pawn, h5 black pawn, a4 black pawn, d4 black knight, g4 black pawn, a3 white pawn, c3 white king, e3 white knight, g3 white pawn, b2 white pawn, c2 white pawn, h2 white pawn, e1 white knight

Final position after 54...Nd4, with White to move. The same position arose twice before after 48.Kc3 and 50.Ne1, but with Black to move instead.

August 29. Another Richter–Rauzer, after 13...Nxd2 the game was equal (Matanović, Ugrinović), but it promised to be a "keen fight when both kings castled on opposite wings". Spassky outplayed Fischer and got a better position, and Fischer "eschewed complications, for the first time clearly content to play for a draw with White". Fischer headed for a drawish endgame but Spassky twice avoided a draw by threefold repetition. After 54 moves, Fischer made an incorrect claim of threefold repetition, but Spassky agreed to a draw anyway.

Sicilian Defense: Richter–Rauzer Attack (ECO B68)
1. e4 c5 2. Nf3 Nc6 3. d4 cxd4 4. Nxd4 Nf6 5. Nc3 d6 6. Bg5 e6 7. Qd2 a6 8. 0-0-0 Bd7 9. f4 Be7 10. Be2 0-0 11. Bf3 h6 12. Bh4 Nxe4 13. Bxe7 Nxd2 14. Bxd8 Nxf3 15. Nxf3 Rfxd8 16. Rxd6 Kf8 17. Rhd1 Ke7 18. Na4 Be8 19. Rxd8 Rxd8 20. Nc5 Rb8 21. Rd3 a5 22. Rb3 b5 23. a3 a4 24. Rc3 Rd8 25. Nd3 f6 26. Rc5 Rb8 27. Rc3 g5 28. g3 Kd6 29. Nc5 g4 30. Ne4+ Ke7 31. Ne1 Rd8 32. Nd3 Rd4 33. Nef2 h5 34. Rc5 Rd5 35. Rc3 Nd4 36. Rc7+ Rd7 37. Rxd7+ Bxd7 38. Ne1 e5 39. fxe5 fxe5 40. Kd2 Bf5 41. Nd1 Kd6 42. Ne3 Be6 43. Kd3 Bf7 44. Kc3 Kc6 45. Kd3 Kc5 46. Ke4 Kd6 47. Kd3 Bg6+ 48. Kc3 Kc5 49. Nd3+ Kd6 50. Ne1 Kc6 51. Kd2 Kc5 52. Nd3+ Kd6 53. Ne1 Ne6 54. Kc3 Nd4 (diagram) ½–½

=== Game 21: Spassky–Fischer, 0–1 (Sicilian Taimanov) ===
Spassky–Fischer, game 21

Position: d7 white bishop, f6 black pawn, f5 white pawn, h5 black pawn, a4 white pawn, f4 black king, b3 white pawn, a2 black rook, f2 white pawn, g2 white king

The final position, after Spassky's sealed move 41.Bd7.

August 31. The 21st and the last game of the match. Fischer used a line of the Sicilian that he had never before played as Black, and further surprised Spassky with a novelty on move eight by accepting an isolated pawn and obtaining, as a compensation, "good play for his pieces on the central squares". After 14...Qxf6 the game was equal (Taimanov). Spassky played badly in the endgame, and the game was adjourned with a big advantage for Fischer. Fischer's 40th move was not the best, however; he should have played 40...Kg4! before ...h5 (his actual 40th move). Had Spassky sealed 41.Kh3! (preventing ...Kg4), he would have had drawing chances. Instead he sealed 41.Bd7?, which would have permitted Black to win with 41...Kg4 followed by pushing his h-pawn. On September 1, the day scheduled for resumption of the game, arbiter Lothar Schmid informed Fischer and the audience that Spassky had resigned the game by telephone, making Fischer the winner of the match. FIDE President Max Euwe expressed disappointment that Spassky did not go to the playing hall to congratulate Fischer.

Sicilian Defense: Paulsen Variation, transposing to Taimanov Variation (ECO B46)
1. e4 c5 2. Nf3 e6 3. d4 cxd4 4. Nxd4 a6 5. Nc3 Nc6 6. Be3 Nf6 7. Bd3 d5 8. exd5 exd5 9. 0-0 Bd6 10. Nxc6 bxc6 11. Bd4 0-0 12. Qf3 Be6 13. Rfe1 c5 14. Bxf6 Qxf6 15. Qxf6 gxf6 16. Rad1 Rfd8 17. Be2 Rab8 18. b3 c4 19. Nxd5 Bxd5 20. Rxd5 Bxh2+ 21. Kxh2 Rxd5 22. Bxc4 Rd2 23. Bxa6 Rxc2 24. Re2 Rxe2 25. Bxe2 Rd8 26. a4 Rd2 27. Bc4 Ra2 28. Kg3 Kf8 29. Kf3 Ke7 30. g4 f5 31. gxf5 f6 32. Bg8 h6 33. Kg3 Kd6 34. Kf3 Ra1 35. Kg2 Ke5 36. Be6 Kf4 37. Bd7 Rb1 38. Be6 Rb2 39. Bc4 Ra2 40. Be6 h5 41. Bd7 (diagram) 0–1

The final score was 12½–8½. Fischer became the 11th world champion. Spassky won three games (including the forfeit in game 2), Fischer won seven, and there were eleven draws.

== Aftermath ==
Fischer's victory made him an instant celebrity. Upon his return to New York, a Bobby Fischer Day was held. (Note: "Wearing city's gold medal and accompanied by Mayor John Lindsay, Bobby shakes hands with some 3,000 fans attending...") He was offered numerous product endorsement offers worth millions of dollars, all of which he declined. He appeared on the cover of Sports Illustrated with American Olympic swimming champion Mark Spitz. Fischer also made television appearances on a Bob Hope special and The Tonight Show starring Johnny Carson. But the games in this match proved to be his last public competitive games for two decades. (Note: Fischer's next competitive match would be Fischer–Spassky (1992 match).)

Before the match, Fischer had felt that the first-to-12½-points format was unfair since it encouraged whoever was leading to play for draws instead of wins. He then adopted this strategy in the match: after having taken a comfortable lead, he drew games 14–20. With each game, he coasted closer to the title, while Spassky lost a chance to fight back. This style of chess offended Fischer. Instead he demanded the format be changed to that of the very first World Chess Championship, between Wilhelm Steinitz and Johannes Zukertort, where the winner was the first player to score 10 wins, with draws not counting. In case of a 9–9 score, the champion would retain the title and the prize fund would be split equally. A FIDE Congress was held in 1974 during the Nice Olympiad. The delegates voted in favor of Fischer's 10-win proposal, but rejected the 9–9 clause as well as the possibility of an unlimited match. In response, Fischer refused to defend his title. Anatoly Karpov, who had fought his way through the 1975 candidates tournament, was declared World Champion by forfeit.

Seventeen years later, Fischer entered negotiations with sponsors willing to fund a match under his proposed format, settling on a bid from Yugoslav millionaire Jezdimir Vasiljević. Fischer insisted that since he had not been defeated in a match, he was still the true world champion. He further claimed that all the games in the FIDE-sanctioned World Championship matches, involving Karpov and his challengers Korchnoi and Kasparov, had prearranged outcomes. He then challenged Spassky (tied for 96th–102nd on the FIDE rating list at the time) to a rematch, leading to the 1992 Fischer–Spassky match.

== In popular culture ==
- The musical Chess, with lyrics by Tim Rice and music by Björn Ulvaeus and Benny Andersson, tells the story of two chess champions, referred to only as "The American" and "The Russian". The musical is loosely based on the 1972 World Championship match between Fischer and Spassky.
- During the 1972 Fischer–Spassky match, the Soviet bard Vladimir Vysotsky wrote an ironic two-song cycle "Honor of the Chess Crown". The first song is about a rank-and-file Soviet worker's preparation for the match with Fischer; the second is about the game. Many expressions from the songs have become catchphrases in Russian culture.
- The 2011 documentary Bobby Fischer Against the World features extensive archival footage from the match.
- The 2014 film Pawn Sacrifice tells the story of Fischer's attempts to defeat Russian Boris Spassky and become the world champion. The film is directed by Edward Zwick and stars Tobey Maguire as Fischer and Liev Schreiber as Spassky.
- In the sixth episode of season 3 of Drunk History, comedian Rich Fulcher recounts the 1972 World Championship match between Fischer and Spassky.

== See also ==
- Fischer–Spassky (1992 match)
