= World Chess Hall of Fame =

Chess museum in United States

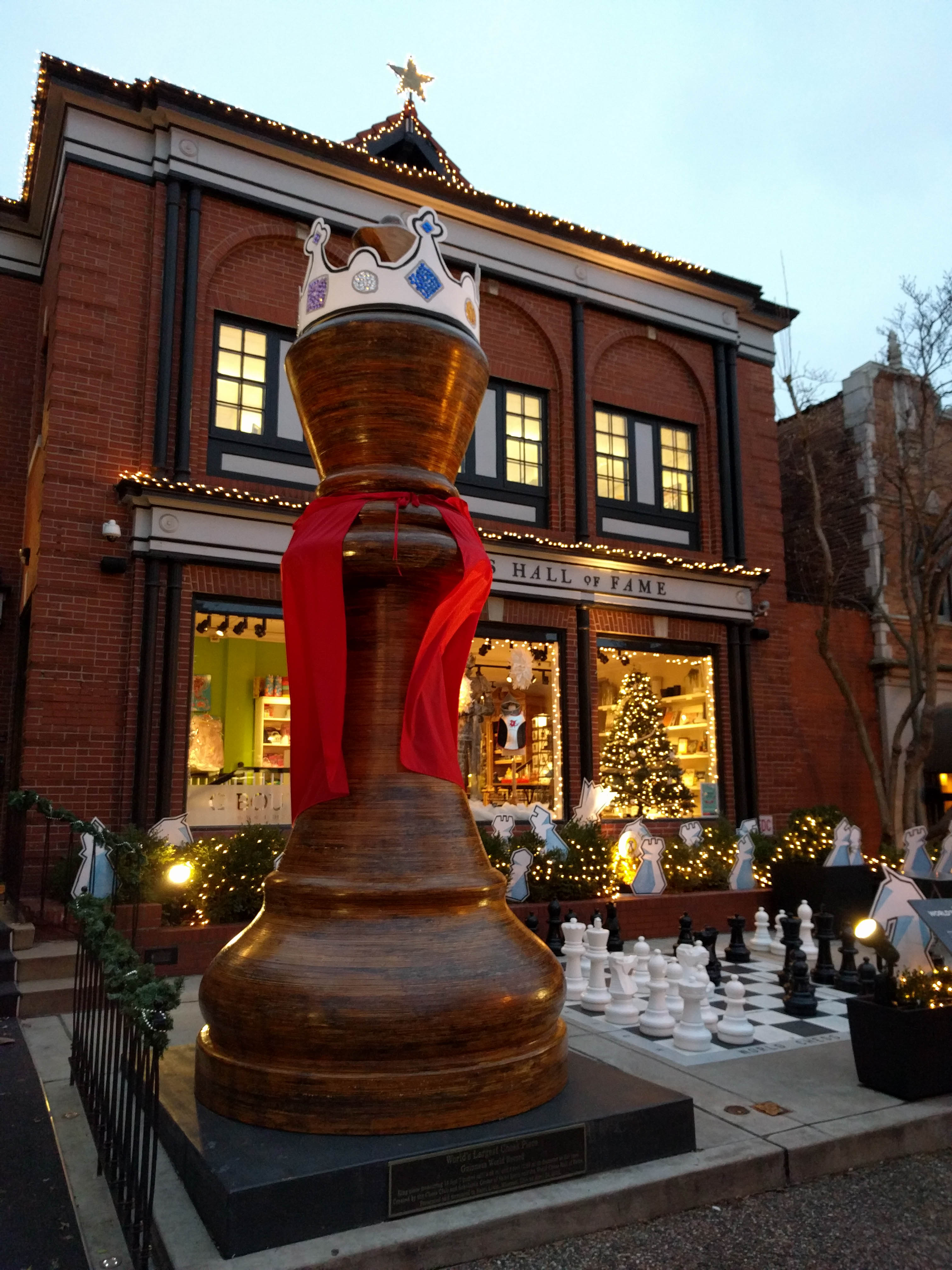
- Street view

- Location within St. Louis
- Former name: U.S. Chess Hall of Fame; World Chess Hall of Fame and Sidney Samole Museum
- Established: 1984
- Location: Central West End, St. Louis Missouri
- Coordinates: 38.644301°N 90.261153°W
- Type: Hall of Fame; Art museum
- Public transit access: MetroBus
- Website: worldchesshof.org

The World Chess Hall of Fame (WCHOF) is a nonprofit collecting institution in the Central West End neighborhood of St. Louis, Missouri, United States. Founded in 1984, it features chess exhibits, engages in educational outreach, and maintains a list of inductees to the U.S. Chess Hall of Fame and World Chess Hall of Fame.

Formerly located in New Windsor, New York, Washington, D.C., and Miami, Florida, it moved to St. Louis on September 9, 2011. It is run by the United States Chess Trust.

The World Chess Hall of Fame is located across the street from the Saint Louis Chess Club, with which it collaborates on programming, instruction, and outreach.

The museum's permanent collection and temporary exhibitions highlight the great players, historic games, and cultural history of chess. Rotating exhibitions feature items from the permanent collection, including a piece from an Egyptian game called senet, the earliest known board game; a custom-made set of chess furniture that belonged to Bobby Fischer; and the first commercial chess computer. The museum also displays two temporary exhibitions per year.

== History ==
Logo used from 2011 to 2013

Steven Doyle, president of the United States Chess Federation from 1984 to 1987, founded the World Chess Hall of Fame in 1986 as the U.S. Chess Hall of Fame.

It opened in 1988 in the basement of the Federation's then-headquarters in New Windsor, New York. The museum's small collection included a book of chess openings signed by Bobby Fischer; a silver set awarded to Paul Morphy, American chess player and unofficial World Champion; and cardboard plaques honoring past grandmasters.

In 1992, the U.S. Chess Trust purchased the museum and moved its contents to Washington, D.C., where it featured America's "big four" chess players: Paul Morphy, Bobby Fischer, Frank Marshall, and Samuel Reshevsky. It displayed the World Chess Championship trophy won by the United States team in 1993 as well as numerous chess boards and chess pieces. The museum gave visitors the opportunity to play against a chess computer. By 2001, the collection had grown to include numerous chess sets and boards and plaques commemorating inductees to the U.S. and World halls of fame.

In the late 1990s, Sidney Samole, former owner of Excalibur Electronics, proposed to move the hall of fame to Miami, where it would be located in a rook-shaped building constructed by Excalibur. Although Samole died in 2000, the U.S. Chess Trust accepted the proposal the following year. Reopened in 2001, it was renamed the World Chess Hall of Fame and Sidney Samole Museum. The museum continued collecting chess sets, books, tournament memorabilia, advertisements, photographs, furniture, medals, trophies, and journals until it closed in 2009.

Soon afterward, billionaire Rex Sinquefield agreed to pay to move the museum to St. Louis. He also renovated its new building, across the street from the Sinquefield-founded St. Louis Chess Club.

== Hall of Fame ==
There are 74 members in the U.S. Chess Hall of Fame.

There are 53 members in the World Chess Hall of Fame. The winner of the first Women's World Chess Championship, Vera Menchik, was the first woman to be inducted into the WCHOF in 2011.

=== U.S. Chess Hall of Fame Inductees ===
The U.S. Chess Federation Recognitions Committee considers candidates for the U.S. Chess Hall of Fame and sends its nominations to the U.S. Chess Trust annually. The trustees of the U.S. Chess Trust vote on who should be inducted. The induction itself takes place at the U.S. Chess Federation Awards Luncheon during the U.S. Open or at the World Chess Hall of Fame itself. The induction is almost always performed by the chairman of the U.S. Chess Trust or the chairman of the Hall of Fame Committee.

2017 members of the committee included John McCrary (chair), Frank Camaratta, John Crumiller, William John Donaldson, John Hilbert, Randy Hough, Alexey Root, Sophia Rohde, Andrew Soltis, Peter Tamburro, and Fred Wilson.

Count	Inductee	Induction year
1	Reuben Fine	1986
2	Robert Fischer	1986
3	Isaac Kashdan	1986
4	George Koltanowski	1986
5	Frank Marshall	1986
6	Paul Morphy	1986
7	Harry Pillsbury	1986
8	Sammy Reshevsky	1986
9	Sam Loyd	1987
10	Wilhelm Steinitz	1987
11	Arpad Elo	1988
12	Hermann Helms	1988
13	Al Horowitz	1989
14	Hans Berliner	1990
15	John W. Collins	1991
16	Arthur Dake	1991
17	Arnold Denker	1992
18	Gisela Gresser	1992
19	George MacKenzie	1992
20	Pal Benko	1993
21	Victor Palciauskas	1993
22	Arthur Bisguier	1994
23	Robert Byrne	1994
24	Larry Evans	1994
25	Ed Edmondson Jr.	1995
26	Fred Reinfeld	1996
27	Kenneth Harkness	1997
28	Milan Vukcevich	1998
29	Benjamin Franklin	1999
30	Edmar Mednis	2000
31	Lubomir Kavalek	2001
32	Lev Alburt	2003
33	Walter Browne	2003
34	Donald Byrne	2003
35	Anatoly Lein	2004
36	Leonid Shamkovich	2004
37	Yasser Seirawan	2006
38	Irving Chernev	2007
39	Jeremy Gaige	2007
40	Joel Benjamin	2008
41	Larry Christiansen	2008
42	Nick de Firmian	2008
43	John Fedorowicz	2009
44	Burt Hochberg	2009
45	Diane Savereide	2010
46	Jackson Showalter	2010
47	Herman Steiner	2010
48	Boris Gulko	2011
49	Andy Soltis	2011
50	Alex Yermolinsky	2012
51	Gregory Kaidanov	2013
52	Mona May Karff	2013
53	Abraham Kupchik	2014.
54	Jacqueline Piatigorsky	2014.
55	Alexander Shabalov	2015
56	Gata Kamsky	2016
57	Maurice Ashley	2016
58	Edward Lasker	2017
59	Bill Goichberg	2018
60	Alex Onischuk	2018
61	Max Judd	2019
62	Susan Polgar	2019
63	William Lombardy	2019
64	Rex Sinquefield	2020
65	Jeanne Sinquefield	2020
66	James Sherwin	2021
67	Frank Brady	2021
68	Daniel Willard Fiske	2022
69	James Tarjan	2022
70	John Watson	2022
71	Yury Shulman	2023
72	Lisa Lane	2023
73	William Shinkman	2023
74	Charles Henry Stanley	2024
75	Irina Krush	2025
76	Bruce Pandolfini	2025

=== World Chess Hall of Fame inductees ===
The World Chess Hall of Fame inductees are nominated by representatives of the World Chess Federation (FIDE).

Count	Inductee	Induction year
1	José Raúl Capablanca	2001
2	Robert Fischer	2001
3	Emanuel Lasker	2001
4	Paul Morphy	2001
5	Wilhelm Steinitz	2001
6	Mikhail Botvinnik	2003
7	Tigran Petrosian	2003
8	Vasily Smyslov	2003
9	Boris Spassky	2003
10	Mikhail Tal	2003
11	Alexander Alekhine	2004
12	Max Euwe	2004
13	Anatoly Karpov	2004
14	Garry Kasparov	2005
15	Siegbert Tarrasch	2008
16	Vera Menchik	2011
17	Elisaveta Bykova	2013
18	Mikhail Chigorin	2013
19	Nona Gaprindashvili	2013
20	Maia Chiburdanidze	2014
21	Paul Keres	2014
22	Olga Rubtsova	2015
23	Lyudmila Rudenko	2015
24	Carl Schlechter	2015
25	David Bronstein	2016
26	Sonja Graf	2016
27	Howard Staunton	2016
28	Johannes Zukertort	2016
29	Paula Kalmar-Wolf	2017
30	Viktor Korchnoi	2017
31	Alla Kushnir	2017
32	Aron Nimzowitsch	2018
33	Richard Réti	2018
34	Kira Zvorykina	2018
35	Akiba Rubinstein	2019
36	Mark Taimanov	2019
37	Xie Jun	2019
38	Miguel Najdorf	2021
39	Judit Polgár	2021
40	Eugene Torre	2021
41	Bent Larsen	2023
42	Lajos Portisch	2023
43	Susan Polgár	2023
44	Zhu Chen	2024
45	Irina Levitina	2024
46	Elena Donaldson-Akhmilovskaya	2024
47	Fridrik Olafsson	2024
48	Lev Polugaevsky	2024
49	Nana Alexandria	2024
50	Robert Hübner	2024
51	Vladimir Kramnik	2024
52	Efim Geller	2024
53	Oscar Panno	2024
54	Pia Cramling	2025
55	Vlastimil Hort	2025
56	Jan Timman	2025
57	Vasyl Ivanchuk	2026
58	Alexandra Kosteniuk	2026
