= Peter Winston (chess player) =

American chess player (born 1958)

- Winston at the 1974 World Open
- Born: Peter Jonathan Winston; March 18, 1958; New York City, U.S.
- Disappeared: January 26, 1978 (aged 19)
- Status: Missing for 48 years, 5 months and 14 days
- Chess career
- Country: United States
- Title: National Master (1972)
- Peak rating: 2285 (January 1975)

Peter Jonathan Winston (March 18, 1958 – disappeared January 26, 1978) was an American chess player. He was awarded the title of National Master in 1972, and shared first prize in the 1974 U.S. Junior Chess Championship. He was labelled a genius as a child, but developed mental-health problems in his late teens. He disappeared in mysterious circumstances in 1978, at the age of nineteen.

== Early life and education ==
Peter Jonathan Winston was born on March 18, 1958. His father, Leonard, taught chemistry at Columbia, and the family lived in a subsidized three-bedroom apartment on Riverside Drive, Manhattan.

At the age of five, Winston was enrolled at Sands Point Elementary, a school for gifted children on Long Island. In 1964, at the age of six, he was profiled by The Saturday Evening Post in an article titled "The Remarkable Life of a Little Genius". According to the article, a clinical psychologist who tested him wrote: "Peter is a true genius. He is 5 yrs. and 5 mos. and his range of information, arithmetical reasoning, attention, concentration and abstract reasoning is equivalent to 15 yrs. and 10 mos." His mother, Florence, is quoted as saying: "Maybe he won't be able to make use of this vast potential; maybe something will get in the way."

Winston was taught to play chess by his grandfather. Winston's father discouraged him from playing the game, fearing that it would take over his life. He felt his son's true gift was for mathematics. In 1967, when Winston was nine years old, his father died unexpectedly from a heart attack.

After Sands Point Elementary, Winston's education became more sporadic. He enrolled at New Lincoln High School, but left after a year. He later said: "I was sick and tired of the daily grind at New Lincoln, of having boring classes...and all that shit." He and his mother then participated in the creation of an alternative high school named Elizabeth Cleaners Street School. He initially seemed happy there, but by the second year had more or less dropped out. One of the teachers at the school was David Nasaw. With Nasaw's help, Winston was eventually accepted by Franconia College, and started there in September 1975, at the age of seventeen.

== Chess career ==
Winston was awarded the title of National Master in June 1972, at the age of fourteen.

On 1 July 1972, in the first round of the Atlantic Open in New York City, he decisively defeated the grandmaster Walter Browne (who later won the U.S. Chess Championship six times). Winston annotated the game for the October 1972 issue of Chess Life & Review.

In 1974, he shared first prize with Larry Christiansen at the U.S. Junior Chess Championship in Philadelphia. As a result, the U.S. Chess Federation decided to send Christiansen to the U.S. Open in New York and Winston to the World Junior Chess Championship in Manila. Winston struggled in what was his first major event on the international stage and finished eighth. (Note: Both Sarah Weinman and Brin-Jonathan Butler state that Winston came sixth in the 1974 World Junior Chess Championship. However, reports published in Chess Life & Review at the time indicate that he finished eighth.)

When the FIDE international rating list was published in January 1975, Winston had a rating of 2285. This was his peaking rating. In January 1976, his rating fell to 2260, where it stayed until January 1979, when it fell to 2220.

== Mental health ==
In 1976, at the age of eighteen, Winston suffered a psychotic breakdown and was hospitalized. He was diagnosed as schizophrenic and given large doses of Thorazine. Later, his diagnosis was changed to one of manic-depression, and he was given lithium. For a period of time, he was held in a padded room at the New York State Psychiatric Institute.

Winston believed the medication he had been given had affected his ability to play chess. In November 1977, he participated in a chess tournament at Hunter College High School. He played nine games and lost all of them. The result was so statistically implausible that officials refused to rate the tournament. An administrator from FIDE suggested Winston had lost the games intentionally.

== Disappearance ==
On January 25, 1978, Charles Hertan went to visit Winston at his apartment on Bleecker Street in Greenwich Village. Winston insisted that they go to the Meadowlands racetrack, so they took the bus there and spent some time betting on races. Hertan grew tired and went home alone; Winston telephoned his sister, Wynde, and asked her to pick him up, which she did. He spent the night at his sister's apartment, and in the morning she told him he had to see a doctor. He reacted by running away from the apartment screaming. He then went to a friend's home, where he ate lunch and spoke of going to Texas to visit Walter Korn, whom he described as "God". His friend's parents found his behavior disturbing and telephoned his mother. He left his friend's house after lunch and was never seen again.

Winston's disappearance coincided with the Great Blizzard of 1978 (January 24–29), which was followed by a blizzard in the Northeastern United States (February 5–7). It is unknown whether his disappearance was linked to the blizzards.

Around 2010, Winston's mother telephoned Frank Brady and asked him whether he would like Winston's chess books. Upon arriving at the apartment on Riverside Drive, Brady discovered that Winston's bedroom was exactly as it had been left more than thirty years before. Winston's clothes were still hanging in the wardrobe. Winston's mother said she never went in the room. Brady took the books back to the Marshall Chess Club, and shortly afterwards he heard that Winston's mother had died.

== Notable games ==
Winston vs. Browne
Atlantic Open, New York City
1 July 1972

Position: f8 black king, a7 white rook, h7 black pawn, c6 white pawn, g6 black pawn, a5 black pawn, d5 white pawn, f4 black pawn, g4 white pawn, h4 black knight, f3 black pawn, h3 white pawn, a2 white pawn, g1 white king

Final position
- Peter Winston vs. Walter Browne
  Atlantic Open, New York City, 1 July 1972
  Benoni Defense, Taimanov Variation (A67)
  1.d4 c5 2.d5 Nf6 3.c4 e6 4.Nc3 exd5 5.cxd5 d6 6.e4 g6 7.f4 Bg7 8.Bb5+ Nfd7 9.Bd3 0-0 10.Nf3 Na6 11.0-0 Rb8 12.Nd2 Bd4+ 13.Kh1 Nf6 14.Nf3 Ng4 15.Bxa6 Bxc3 16.bxc3 bxa6 17.c4 Re8 18.e5 Rb4 19.h3 Nh6 20.Qd3 a5 21.Ba3 Ra4 22.Qb3 Bd7 23.Rfe1 Nf5 24.g4 Nh4 25.Ng5 dxe5 26.Ne4 exf4 27.Nxc5 Rxa3 28.Qxa3 Qc7 29.Rxe8+ Bxe8 30.Re1 Bd7 31.Nxd7 Qxd7 32.Qe7 Qxe7 33.Rxe7 f3 34.Kg1 Kf8 35.Rxa7 f5 36.c5 f4 37.c6 1–0 Black resigned.
- Peter Winston vs. Jaime Sunye Neto
  World Junior Championship, Manila, August 1974
  Sicilian Defense, Najdorf Variation, Poisoned Pawn Variation (B97)
  1.e4 c5 2.Nf3 d6 3.d4 cxd4 4.Nxd4 Nf6 5.Nc3 a6 6.Bg5 e6 7.f4 Qb6 8.Qd2 Qxb2 9.Nb3 Qa3 10.Bxf6 gxf6 11.Be2 h5 12.0-0 Nd7 13.Nb1 Qb2 14.Qe3 f5 15.exf5 Nc5 16.fxe6 fxe6 17.N1d2 Nxb3 18.Nxb3 Qf6 19.Bc4 Be7 20.Rae1 Rh6 21.Nd4 d5 22.Bd3 Bc5 23.c3 Bd7 24.f5 0-0-0 25.fxe6 Qxe6 26.Nxe6 Bxe3+ 27.Rxe3 Rxe6 28.Rxe6 Bxe6 29.Rf6 Kd7 30.Bf5 Re8 31.Rxe6 Rxe6 32.Kf2 Kd6 33.Bxe6 Kxe6 34.Ke3 Ke5 35.g3 Kf5 36.h3 Ke5 37.Kd3 a5 38.Ke3 b5 39.a3 d4+ 40.cxd4+ Kd5 41.Kd3 b4 42.axb4 axb4 43.g4 hxg4 44.hxg4 b3 45.g5 Ke6 46.Kc3 1–0 Black resigned.
