= List of presidents of the United States Chess Federation =

This article lists the presidents of the United States Chess Federation from its foundation in 1939 to present. The presidents were elected by voting members to three-year terms. Now the executive board elects its own officers annually.

== List ==
- 1939–1942 George Sturgis
- 1943–1948 Elbert Wagner, Jr.
- 1948–1951 Paul Geirs
- 1951–1954 Harold M. Phillips
- 1954–1957 Frank Graves
- 1957–1960 Jerry Spann
- 1960–1963 Fred Cramer
- 1963–1966 Ed Edmondson
- 1966–1969 Marshall Rohland
- 1969–1972 Leroy Dubeck
- 1972–1975 Frank Skoff
- 1975–1978 George Koltanowski
- 1978–1981 Gary Sperling
- 1981–1984 Tim Redman
- 1984–1987 Steven Doyle
- 1987–1990 Harold Winston
- 1990–1993 Maxim Dlugy
- 1993–1996 Denis Barry
- 1996–1999 Don Schultz
- 1999–2000 Bob Smith
- 2000–2001 Tim Redman
- 2001–2003 John McCrary
- 2003–2005 Beatriz Marinello
- 2005–2008 Bill Goichberg
- 2009–2011 Jim Berry
- 2011–2015 Ruth Haring
- 2015–2017 Gary Walters
- 2017–2018 Mike Hoffpauir
- 2018–2020 W. Allen Priest
- 2020–2022 Mike Hoffpauir
- 2022–2024 Randy Bauer
- 2024–2026 Kevin Pryor
- 2026–present John Fernandez

== See also ==
- United States Chess Federation
- Executive Directors of the United States Chess Federation
- Fédération Internationale des Échecs (FIDE)
- International Correspondence Chess Federation (ICCF)
