= 1933 in chess =

Events in chess in 1933:

- The 5th Chess Olympiad (known at the time as the Folkestone Team Tournament or the Hamilton-Russell Cup) is held in Folkestone. The United States wins the gold medal, Czechoslovakia silver, and Sweden bronze.
- The Women's World Championship is held in conjunction with the Olympiad. Vera Menchik (Czechoslovakia) easily retains her title.
- The Bulgarian Championship is inaugurated in Varna.
- Chess Review is established by Isaac Kashdan. The leading American chess magazine for most of its run, the Chess Review would be published from January 1933 until November 1969 when it merged with Chess Life to form Chess Life & Review.

== Tournaments ==
- Hastings Christmas Congress, held 28 December 1932 to 6 January 1933, is won by Salo Flohr (Czechoslovakia) for the second consecutive year, scoring 7/9 with no losses. Vasja Pirc (Yugoslavia) is second with 6½ followed by Mir Sultan Khan with 6.
- Masters tournament in Budapest is won by Esteban Canal with 10/14, followed by Pál Réthy with 9½, Andor Lilienthal with 9, Lajos Steiner with 8½, and Erich Eliskases with 8.
- United States Team Tournament held to select players to join Frank Marshall and Isaac Kashdan on the US Olympiad team is won by Reuben Fine with 8/11, followed by Arthur Dake and A.C. Simonson tied at 7½.
- Aachen is the site of a National Masters tournament in June, won by Efim Bogoljubow. The tournament is organized by the Grossdeutsche Schachbund, a new state-supported chess federation with Nazi Propaganda Minister Joseph Goebbels serving as honorary chair. The editors of Chess Review decry the virtual exclusion of Jews from German chess, not only from tournaments but also from chess cafés and playing rooms.
- Western Open held September 23 to October 1 in Detroit is won by Reuben Fine with 12/13 over Samuel Reshevsky with 11 and Arthur Dake with 9½. Fine scored +10−1=0, the only loss being to Reshevsky.

== Matches ==
- 57th Varsity Match in April is won by Oxford over Cambridge, 5–2. Cambridge leads the overall series by 26 matches to 25, with 6 ties.
- Salo Flohr (Czechoslovakia) beats Henry Grob (Switzerland), 4½–1½.
- Reuben Fine defeats Arthur Dake +4−2=3 in a match held in New York City at the Marshall Chess Club and the Manhattan Chess Club.
- Flohr and Mikhail Botvinnik draw a match held in Moscow and Leningrad, 2 wins, 2 losses and eight draws each.

== Exhibitions ==
- The National Chess Federation (United States) organized a chess program for the 1933 Chicago World's Fair. World Champion Alexander Alekhine played a blindfold simultaneous exhibition on a record-setting 32 boards, winning 19, drawing 9, and losing 4. This broke the previous record of 30 simultaneous blindfold games set by George Koltanowski in Antwerp. Alekhine also played three games of living chess, in which the chess pieces were people in medieval costumes arrayed on a large outdoor board. The last of these games, held on June 19, was against Edward Lasker. A masters tournament was planned for the Fair but was canceled due to lack of funds. The scheduled Intercollegiate Tournament was held and was won by Lieutenant John O. Matheson of West Point.

== Births ==
- Burt Hochberg, American chess writer and editor
- February 3 — Raúl Sanguinetti in Paraná, Entre Ríos, Argentinian GM
- March 5 – Evgeni Vasiukov in Moscow, Russian/Soviet GM
- May 29 – Nikola Padevsky in Plovdiv, Bulgarian GM
- September 30 – János Flesch in Budapest, Hungarian GM
- October 7 – Jonathan Penrose in Colchester, English GM and Correspondence GM
- October 15 – Zadok Domnitz in Tel Aviv
- October 15 – James Sherwin in New York City, American IM
- November 12 – Borislav Ivkov in Belgrade, Serbian/Yugoslavian GM
- November 13 – Bukhuti Gurgenidze in Surami, Georgia, Georgian/Soviet GM
- November 15 – Egon Varnusz in Budapest, Hungarian FM and chess writer

== Deaths ==
- March 7 – Hermann von Gottschall, 70, German player
- March 27 – William Samuel Viner, 52, Australian player
- April 23 – Henry William Barry, 54, American problemist and problem editor of the American Chess Bulletin
- July 22 – Adolf Georg Olland, 66, leading Dutch player
- October 17 – Johann Berger, 88, Austrian player, theorist, and endgame composer
