= Executive Directors of the United States Chess Federation =

This article lists the current and former executive directors of the United States Chess Federation.

== List ==
- 1952–1960 Kenneth Harkness
- 1960–1961 Frank Brady
- 1963–1964 Joe Reinhardt
- 1966–1976 Ed Edmondson
- 1977–1978 Martin Morrison
- part year Richard Meyerson
- part year George Cunningham
- 1979–1987 Gerald Dullea
- 1988–1996 Al Lawrence
- 1996 (acting) George Filippone
- 1997–1999 Mike Cavallo
- 1999–2000 Gerald Dullea
- 2000–2002 George DeFeis
- 2002–2003 Frank Niro
- 2003 (acting) Grant Perks
- 2004–2005 Bill Goichberg
- 2005–May 2013 Bill Hall
- June 2013-October 2013 Francisco Guadalupe (interim)
- November 2013-October 2017 Jean Hoffman
- October 2017-February 2024 Carol B. Meyer
- March 2024-January 2026 Ranae Bartlett
- January 2026-Present Fred Abousleman

Note: Before 1967, the executive director was called the business manager. Meyerson and Cunningham were titled "staff director".

== See also ==
- Presidents of the United States Chess Federation
- United States Chess Federation
- Fédération Internationale des Échecs (FIDE)
- International Correspondence Chess Federation (ICCF)
