= Kester Svendsen =

American chess organizer

Svendsen, photographed in the early 1960s

James Kester Olaf Svendsen (May 25, 1912 – October 5, 1968) was an American educator, scholar, author, and chess administrator. In 1938 he was awarded a PhD in English from the University of North Carolina. That credential allowed him to take a teaching position at the College of Charleston until 1940 when he relocated to Norman, Oklahoma, to join the University of Oklahoma (OU) faculty as an associate English professor. In 1952 Svendsen was awarded a fellowship in English literature by the John Simon Guggenheim Memorial Foundation.

In 1956, Harvard University Press published his book, "Milton and Science", which took him more than ten years to complete. As a scholar, he specialized in the study of the 17th-century poet John Milton and was president of the John Milton Society. Svendsen was one of the original founders of the Oklahoma Chess Association in 1946. In 1959 Svendsen left OU to take up a post as head of the University of Oregon English Department. He was a prolific writer on the subject of chess and had a regular column published in Chess Life magazine.

== Early life ==
Svendsen was born in 1912 in Charleston, South Carolina. After earning a PhD in English from the University of North Carolina he began what was a short tenure at the College of Charleston. He taught there for just two years before moving on to take a position in 1940 as an associate English professor at the University of Oklahoma in Norman, Oklahoma. In 1943, while teaching at OU, he learned how to play chess, although it is unclear from whom he might have received his first lesson. He worked alongside Jerry Spann organizing chess tournaments in Oklahoma. As a chess player, he achieved a USCF rating of "A", being a rating between the range of 1800 to 1999.

== Career ==
While at the University of Oregon, beginning in 1959, he was tasked with building the new English Department from the ground up, even though he had no experience in this type of endeavor. One colleague there said, "What Oregon got, then, was an individualist not of the common mold, one who for a long time had been free of cant, hypocrisy, and pretentiousness of every kind, a fine scholar and great teacher, but an unknown quantity as an administrator. ... Popularity with students or colleagues was not his aim. He offended a few self-important people with his deflating wit; he intrigued multitudes with his caustic observations concerning academic smog. Profession jargon, woolly words, and fuzzy ideas were repellent to him. ... His regime was Miltonic—magisterial without either false modesty or false pride."

Roland Bartel, who headed the English Department at Oregon from 1968 until 1976 reminisced about Svendsen in an interview in 2004, saying, "Well, he was very charismatic. He knew large sections of Milton by heart and when we had those honors classes, we would gather half-a-dozen sections together in the theater for a lecture on Paradise Lost. Kester would walk back and forth across the stage and recite long passages—oh, he really impressed the students. He was so articulate, so full of energy and witticisms. He conducted a weekly television program called "The Poet's Eye." And he would simply read poetry and discuss it and smoke a cigarette. For thirty minutes he would smoke and read poetry. And he got a lot of fan mail. One viewer wrote in that when he saw Kester light up and read a poem, he would also light up and follow along. Television was still new then—this was the early 1960s. Yes, he was dynamic, charismatic, and brought in good people to go ahead with the graduate program."

Svendsen's short story, "Last Round", is based on a real game of chess played between masters. The game, played between Charousek and Wollner, Kaschau 1893—which Grandmaster Andrew Soltis described as "one of the prettiest ever"—went as follows:

Charousek—Wollner, Kaschau 1893

Danish Gambit 1.e4 e5 2.d4 exd4 3.c3 dxc3 4.Bc4 Nf6 5.Nf3 Bc5 6.Nxc3 d6 7.O-O O-O 8.Ng5 h6 9.Nxf7! Rxf7 10.e5 Ng4!? 11.e6 Qh4! 12.exf7+ Kf8 13.Bf4 Nxf2 14.Qe2 Ng4+ 15.Kh1 Bd7 16.Rae1 Nc6 (diagram) 17.Qe8+!! Rxe8 18.fxe8(Q)+ Bxe8 19.Bxd6 mate.

Charousek - Wollner

Position: a8 black rook, f8 black king, a7 black pawn, b7 black pawn, c7 black pawn, d7 black bishop, f7 white pawn, g7 black pawn, c6 black knight, d6 black pawn, h6 black pawn, c5 black bishop, c4 white bishop, f4 white bishop, g4 black knight, h4 black queen, c3 white knight, a2 white pawn, b2 white pawn, e2 white queen, g2 white pawn, h2 white pawn, e1 white rook, f1 white rook, h1 white king

Position after 16. ...Nc6

== Books written by Svendsen ==
- Last Round
- Milton and Science
- Milton and Medical Lore
- Satan and Science
- The New Damoetas
- Milton's Use of Natural Science
- John Martin and the Expulsion Scene of Paradise Lost
- Cosmological Lore in Milton
- Preliminary List for a Bibliography of Chess Fiction in English
- Milton's Use of Personal Epithet: A Study of His Application of the Principle of Artistic Decorum
- Chess Fiction in English to 1945: a bibliography
- Milton and the Encyclopedias of Science

== Death and legacy ==
Svendsen died at age 56 on October 5, 1968, in Eugene, Oregon. He is remembered as an accomplished author and educator, as well as one of America's premier authorities on the life and work of the renowned English poet John Milton. He was one of the original founders of the Oklahoma Chess Association in 1946, and was a nationally known writer on the subject of chess and had a regular column published in Chess Life magazine.
