= Ed Edmondson =

Ed Edmondson may refer to:

- Ed Edmondson (chess official) (1920–1982), President of the United States Chess Federation
- Ed Edmondson (politician) (1919–1990), American politician from Oklahoma
