= Bill Goichberg =

American chess player (1942–2026)

Personal information
- Born: November 11, 1942 Manhattan, New York, United States
- Died: August 2, 2026 (aged 83)

Chess career
- Country: United States
- Title: FIDE Master (1983)
- Peak rating: 2530 (July 1978)
- Peak ranking: No. 54 (January 1978)

William Goichberg (November 11, 1942 – August 2, 2026) was an American chess master and chess tournament organizer and director. He founded the Continental Chess Association (CCA), which runs the annual World Open and other large tournaments. He was also a past president of the United States Chess Federation (USCF).

== Early life ==
Goichberg was born in Manhattan on November 11, 1942, to Sol and Fannie (née Lieberman) Goichberg, immigrants who were both mandolinists. He grew up in Mount Vernon, New York. His father taught him to play chess when he was about two years old. He played his first tournament in 1961; by 1964 he was a master.

== USCF career ==
After graduating from New York University in 1963, Goichberg worked as USCF Rating Statistician from 1964 to 1967. He became co-editor of Chess Life with Ed Edmondson in 1966.

In 1976 he was captain of the world champion U.S. Chess Olympiad team.

Goichberg was a member of the USCF Policy Board (now called "Executive Board") in 1975–78, 1989–92 and 1996–99. From November 2003 to January 2004 he was USCF Office Manager and in 2004 became USCF Executive Director. In 2005 he was elected president, and held that office until 2008.

== Continental Chess Association (CCA) ==
In 1964 Goichberg founded the New York City Chess Association to organize chess tournaments. In 1968 the organization's scope was widened and name was changed to Continental Chess Association. The CCA has organized, by conservative estimate, several thousand tournaments in the years since it was founded.

The flagship tournament of the CCA, the World Open, first held in 1973, annually draws over 1,000 entries. This figure is now regularly eclipsed by scholastic tournaments, but this may be the largest non-scholastic tournament in the world.

In 1966, CCA was the first organizer to hold USCF-rated scholastic tournaments.

Several of the major scholastic tournaments now run by the U.S. Chess Federation started out as CCA tournaments: the National High School Championship (1969), the National Junior High Championship (1973), the National Elementary Championship (1976), and the National Scholastic K-12 Grade Championship (1991).

According to its website, the CCA introduced non-smoking tournaments in the U.S. (1973).

== Other achievements ==
Goichberg was co-editor of Official Rules of Chess, fourth edition (1993; ISBN 0-8129-2217-4) and authored many articles for Chess Life.

He was a USCF Life Master and FIDE Master. He was National Tournament Director and International Arbiter of FIDE (World Chess Federation).

He was a past president of the New York State Chess Association, which organizes the New York State Championship.

He was inducted to U.S. Chess Hall of Fame in 2018.

== Death ==
Goichberg died on August 2, 2026, at the age of 83.
