= Chess Review =

American magazine

- Chess Review, June 1945
- Former editors: Isaac Kashdan, Israel Albert Horowitz
- Frequency: Monthly
- First issue: January 1933
- Final issue Number: October 1969; Volume 37, Number 10
- Country: United States
- Language: English

Chess Review was a U.S. chess magazine published from January 1933 to October 1969 (Volume 37 Number 10). Until April 1941 it was called The Chess Review. Published in New York, it began on a schedule of at least ten issues a year but later became a monthly. Isaac Kashdan was the editor for the first year, with Al Horowitz and Fred Reinfeld associate editors. After one year, Kashdan left and Horowitz became the editor, a position he retained for the remainder of the magazine's existence. Chess Review was virtually unchallenged as the premier U.S. chess periodical from its start in 1933 until a rival emerged in 1961 after a major revamp of the official United States Chess Federation magazine, Chess Life. The two magazines remained in competition until November 1969, when Horowitz retired and the magazines were merged to become Chess Life & Review.

== History ==
Problem from Jan. 1933 cover

Position: a7 white queen, c6 black king, d6 black pawn, b3 white king, d2 white rook, f1 white bishop

White mates in two moves (Wurzburg)

The cover of the first issue featured a chess problem composed by Otto Wurzburg (1875–1951), a Grand Rapids, Michigan, postal worker. Kashdan was one of the world's premier problem solvers of the 1920s and 1930s. His interest in compositions influenced the magazine for years after he left, and the cover would feature a chess problem every issue until May 1941. Wurzburg served as problem editor and contributed a monthly column. The magazine staff also included art director Bertram Kadish who contributed cartoons and illustrations. An unusual feature of the first issue was a bridge column written by George Reith. Horowitz and Reinfeld were contract bridge devotees, but the column was dropped after three issues.

Horowitz became the editor for the November–December 1933 issue when Kashdan left the magazine to focus more on his playing career. In 1934 it became the first chess periodical to be sold on newsstands and leading department stores. For that reason, no June issue was printed and the magazine dated ahead one month. In December 1935 the magazine began to put "The Official Organ of the American Chess Federation" on the cover. The American Chess Federation was a predecessor of the United States Chess Federation (USCF), established in 1939. Reinfeld would temporarily leave in 1936 to concentrate on his book writing. The August–September 1941 issue featured a new column by Reuben Fine, "Game of the Month". (His rival Samuel Reshevsky would not write for the magazine until some years later.) This column and format would later be continued by Max Euwe and Svetozar Gligorić. In the same issue, Irving Chernev started the column "Chess Quiz". Chernev had begun to contribute to the magazine in its first year but this marked the beginning of a larger role.

Jack Collins and Albert Pinkus joined the staff in 1943. In 1944 Chess Review began billing itself "The Picture Chess Magazine." Reinfeld returned to the magazine in 1945 as Executive Editor, and Horowitz and Kenneth Harkness were listed as Editors and Publishers. Hans Kmoch joined in 1948, contributing coverage of international tournaments, chess opening theory, and eulogies of great chess players. Fine retired from chess and his "Game of the Month" column in November 1949. Euwe resurrected the column in 1952. Savielly Tartakower also joined the magazine that year, providing portions of his memoirs at intermittent intervals.

Contributors later included Walter Korn (1953), Arthur Bisguier (1957), and Petar Trifunovic (1963).

From its beginning in 1933, Chess Review had been the leading U.S. chess periodical. In 1961 Frank Brady redesigned Chess Life, the official USCF publication, changing it from a newspaper format to a glossy magazine. The magazines would compete until November 1969 when Horowitz retired and the USCF purchased Chess Review to merge the magazines to form Chess Life & Review.
