= Jean Hoffman =

Jean Hoffman may refer to:

- Jean Hoffman (water polo) (1893–?), Belgian water polo player
- Jean L. Hoffman (born 1980), social entrepreneur and educator

== See also ==
- Jean Hoffmann (born 1934), French racing cyclist
- Gene Hoffman (disambiguation)
