= Pan American Intercollegiate Team Chess Championship =

The Pan American Intercollegiate Team Chess Championship is the foremost intercollegiate team chess championship in the Americas. Hosted in part by the United States Chess Federation, the Pan-Am Intercollegiate is open to any team comprising four players and up to two alternates from the same post-secondary school (university, college, community college) in North America, Central America, South America, or the Caribbean. The Pan-Am began as such in 1946 (there had been earlier versions open to U.S. schools only), and is held annually, usually December 27–30. It has usually been held in the United States, but was hosted in Canada four times (1969, 1971, 1984, 1999). The current format is a six-round fixed-roster team Swiss-system tournament scored by team (not individual) points. Sometimes the Pan Am Intercollegiate is held as part of a larger event called the Pan American Chess Championship comprising the Pan-Am Intercollegiate, Pan-Am Scholastic Team Championship, and Pan-Am Open (for any individual).

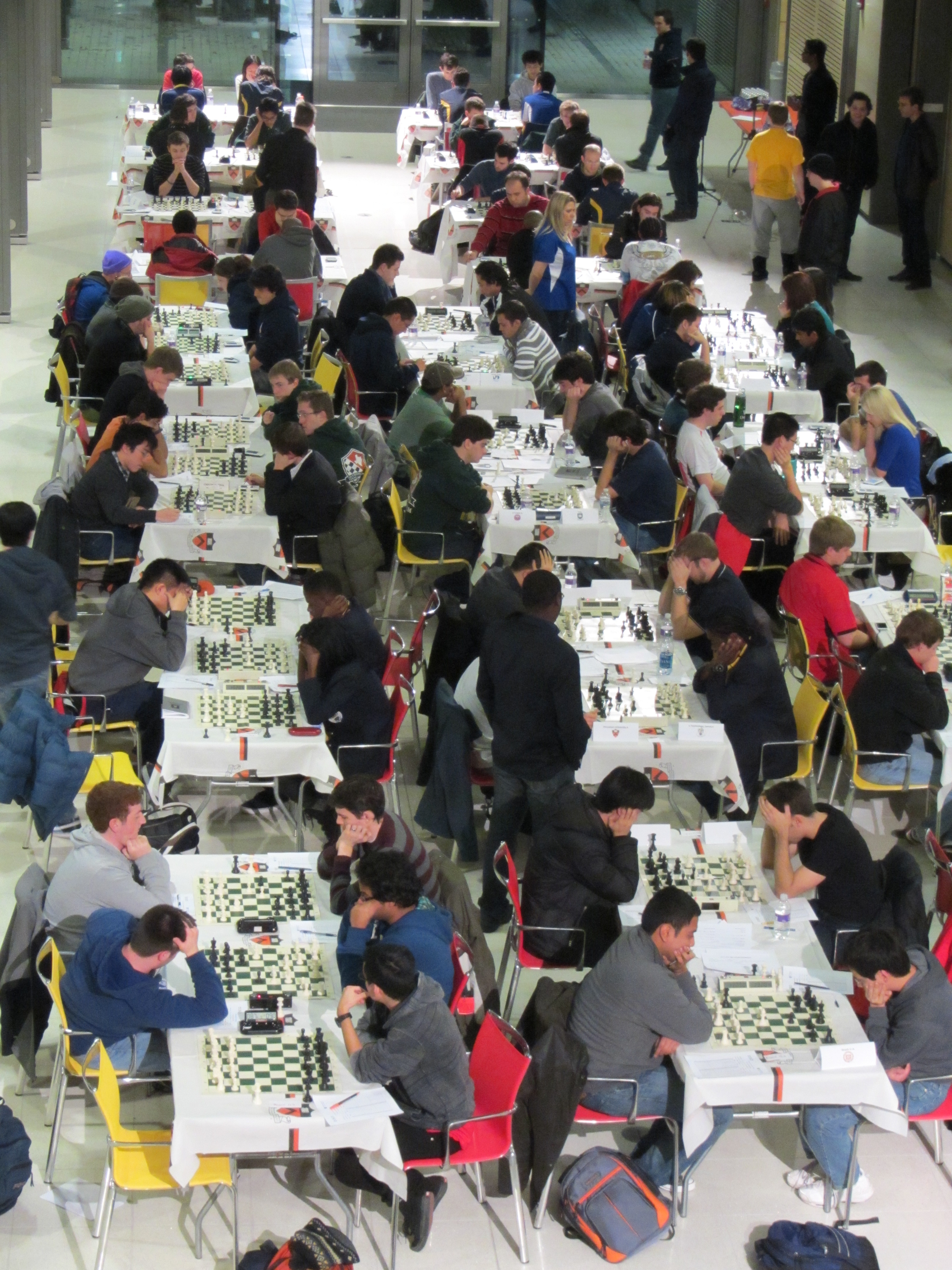
Forty-four teams compete at the 2012 Pan-Am Intercollegiate in Frick Chemistry Lab at Princeton University.

== Significance ==
For many years this tournament was, in effect, a national (or continental) championship. For a few years in the 1970s, the Continental Chess Association held a rival intercollegiate tournament, but that was discontinued. The Pan-Am should not be confused with the Campeonato PanAmericano de Ajedrez Universitario (PanAmerican University Chess Championships), which has been held since 2006 by the Confederación De Ajedrez Para America.

Since 2001, a separate invitational team tournament has been held: the top four finishing US schools in the Pan-Am advance to the President's Cup (informally known as the "Final Four of College Chess" and typically held in the first weekend of April), which determines the US National College or University Champion.

== Organization and Rules ==
The governing body for the Pan-Am is the College Chess Committee (CCC) of the United States Chess Federation (USCF). The CCC ratified a set of guidelines for the Pan-Am in 1992, which have been amended by various resolutions of the CCC, most recently in 2017. These rules include stringent eligibility requirements, which were overhauled in 2004. There are also guidelines for conduct of a scholarship program.

College chess does not fall under the authority of the National Collegiate Athletic Association (NCAA). The Pan-Am is conducted under USCF rules and is rated both by USCF and FIDE.

At the 2012 Pan-Am, the CCC recommended that all cash prizes at the Pan-Am Intercollegiate be eliminated and forbidden.

For many years prior to 1996, high school teams were allowed to compete in the Pan-Am Intercollegiate, though few did.

== History ==
Started in 1946, the Pan-Am has been held under various names and formats. For some years in the period 1945–1974 there was an individual college championship. Following Bobby Fischer's victory at the 1972 World Championship, the popularity of the Pan-Am temporarily soared. Beginning in the 1990s, the Pan-Am has been dominated by teams from schools offering chess scholarships.

=== Intercollegiate chess before the Pan Am ===
==== Quadrangular Intercollegiate league ====
The Quadrangular Intercollegiate league—comprising teams from Harvard University, Yale University, Columbia University and Princeton University—was formed in 1892, founded by Edward Caswell, Yale class of 1866. The tournament typically took place between Christmas and New Year's Day. Winners from 1892 to 1913 are as follows: Columbia 1892, 1893, 1899, 1902, 1906, 1907, 1910–1912; Harvard 1894–1898, 1903–1905; Yale 1901, 1913; Princeton 1908; tie between Harvard and Yale in 1909. In addition, Harvard and Yale played an annual team match.

During the first decade of the twentieth century, future world champion Jose Raul Capablanca represented Columbia, on first board.

==== Triangular Intercollegiate league ====
The Triangular Intercollegiate league—comprising teams from Cornell University, Brown University, and the University of Pennsylvania—was formed in 1899. Champions from 1899 to 1913 are as follows: Pennsylvania 1899, 1904, 1905, 1908, 1909, 1912, 1913; Cornell 1900–1903, 1907, 1910; tie between Pennsylvania and Brown in 1906; tie between Cornell and Pennsylvania in 1911.

In some years, all-star teams from the Quadrangular and Triangular leagues met in a challenge match.

=== Early years ===
The Pan-Am started in 1946.

However, there had been a team event for American schools only before World War II. One noteworthy result from this earlier event, from 1931–32, had City College of New York winning, with Reuben Fine on board one and Sidney Norman Bernstein on board two; the team scored 31.5 out of a possible 32 points.

From 1946 to 1964, the Pan-Am Intercollegiate Team Championship was held every even year, with a Pan-Am Intercollegiate Individual Championship held every odd year from 1945 to 1963.

American schools from the northeast and midwest regions dominated both the hosting and winning of the championship. Columbia University won three titles, the University of Chicago won two, and CCNY won two during this period. The first eight tournaments averaged about a dozen teams taking part. From 1962 to 1967, participation doubled to an average of about 25 teams per year.

=== Annual competition begins ===
With increased interest, annual team competition began in 1964. In 1965, 1967, and 1969, the tournament was an individual-and-team competition, that is, players entered as individuals, but if a school had four or more players entered, the four highest of its students' scores were added to make a team score. The 1965 event saw the first non-American winner, the University of Toronto. The first non-American school to host was Canada's McGill University at Montreal in 1969, and McGill also won the event that year. From 1968 to 1971, interest doubled again, to nearly 50 teams per year.

=== The Fischer boom ===
During the 1960s and 1970s, the level of participation in the Pan-Am grew about tenfold, as one of the effects of Bobby Fischer's chess career, culminating in the World Chess Championship. Attendance averaged nearly 108 teams per year from 1972 to 1978; the highest turnout was 123 teams (520 players) in 1975. Nick Paleveda who became the Florida State Chess Champion persuaded The University of South Florida to offer the first chess scholarship to Future Grandmasters Larry Christiansen and Ron Henley (both recruited with chess scholarships) anchored the 1976 championship team from the University of South Florida Tampa, the first southern school to win.

=== Three straight titles ===
The University of Toronto was the first school to win three straight outright titles, from 1980 to 1982; this feat was repeated by Harvard University from 1988–90. Rhode Island College, led by former US High School Chess Champions James Thibault and Sandeep Joshi, rolled to a convincing victory in 1985. The winning 1983 team from Yale University featured 3 future US Chess Champions in Joel Benjamin, Michael Wilder, and Inna Izrailov.

From 1979 to 1986, an average of 57 teams took part. Future US Chess Champion Grandmaster Patrick Wolff led Yale University to victory in 1987. Harvard University won four titles in five years from 1986 to 1990, either won outright or shared.

Prior to 1986 the Pan Ams were organized by the Intercollegiate League of America (ICLA). The United States Chess Federation took over the organization after the 1986 Pan-Am in Providence, Rhode Island.

=== Kamsky plays in Pan-Am but Vivek Rao shines ===
Chicago 1991 saw a reigning U.S. champion appear in the Pan-Am for the first time, when 17-year-old Soviet émigré Gata Kamsky, was first board for Brooklyn College. Kamsky lost a sensational game to Vivek Rao of the winning University of Illinois team. Rao had previously led Harvard in winning the 1988, 1989 and 1990 Pan Ams.

=== Chess Scholarships and Recent Years ===
The 1990s saw two important events that influenced college chess: the fall of the Iron Curtain sent a flood of very strong eastern European and former Soviet players to the Americas, and several schools began offering major chess scholarships.

The University of South Florida offered chess scholarships in 1976 to two young players, but abandoned the experiment after winning the 1976 Pan-Am. Subsequently, Rhode Island College offered chess scholarships, and eventually won the Pan-Am in 1985. The Borough of Manhattan Community College (BMCC) recruited grandmasters and eventually offered chess scholarships. BMCC won the Pan-Am in 1993, 1994, and 1997. In contrast to those short-lived programs, the chess scholarship programs at the University of Maryland, Baltimore County (UMBC) and the University of Texas at Dallas (UTD) have taken root and continue to the present day.

In 2009, two more Texas schools fielded strong teams: University of Texas at Brownsville (UTB) and Texas Tech University; both offered chess scholarships. The 2010 Final Four was the strongest to date: it featured UMBC (average USCF rating 2559), UTD (2574), UTB (2598), and Texas Tech (2429). In 2012, Webster University and Lindenwood have emerged as contenders.

The 2019 Pan-Am was the strongest ever: the 63 teams included 33 Grandmasters, 20 International Masters, players from 40 FIDE federations, and 10 teams with average US Chess ratings over 2500. It was the largest Pan-Am from 1982 until 2023.

The 2020–2021 Pan-Am was held online at Lichess.org.

The 2025 Pan-Am was the largest edition since 1976, with 91 teams. The Open section was won by the UTRGV A team with a 6-0 score. 30 GMs and 22 IMs participated. 10 teams with average ratings over 2500 USCF competed, including teams from Mizzou, Webster University, UTRGV, Saint Louis University, UTD, Texas Tech, Stanford, University of Chicago, and Yale.

== List of Champions and Venues ==
=== University ===
School	Wins	Year
Borough of Manhattan Community College	3	1993, 1994, 1997
Brooklyn College	2	1962, 1995
City College of New York	2	1946, 1947
Columbia University	5	1950, 1952, 1960, 1971, 1984
Fordham University	1	1954
Harvard University	5	1975, 1986, 1988, 1989, 1990
Massachusetts Institute of Technology	2	1966, 1970
McGill University	1	1969
New York University	1	1995
Rhode Island College	1	1985
San Jose State University	1	1964
Texas Tech University	2	2015, 2019
University of California at Berkeley	3	1963, 1967, 1989
University of Chicago	6	1956, 1958, 1968, 1972, 1973, 1986
University of Florida	1	1979
University of Illinois at Urbana Champaign	2	1991, 2012
University of Maryland, Baltimore County	10	1996, 1998, 1999, 2000, 2001, 2002, 2005, 2008, 2009, 2012
University of Minnesota	1	1992
University of Nebraska–Lincoln	1	1975
University of Pennsylvania	1	1977
University of South Florida	1	1976
University of Texas at Austin	1	1963
University of Texas at Dallas	10	2000, 2001, 2003, 2004, 2006, 2007, 2008, 2010, 2011, 2012
University of Texas Rio Grande Valley	2	2015, 2025
University of Toronto	6	1965, 1973, 1974, 1980, 1981, 1982
Webster University	8	2012, 2013, 2014, 2015 (tie), 2016, 2017, 2018, 2023
Yale University	3	1978, 1983, 1987

=== Cup winners ===
#	Year	Location	# Teams	Winning team
1	1946	New York, NY	13	City College of New York
2	1948	New York, NY	15	City College of New York
3	1950	New York, NY	16	Columbia University
4	1952	New York, NY	12	Columbia University
5	1954	New York, NY	8	Fordham University
6	1956	Philadelphia, PA	14	University of Chicago
7	1958	Cleveland, OH	10	University of Chicago
8	1960	Princeton, NJ	13	Columbia University
9	1962	Philadelphia, PA	28	Brooklyn College
10	1963	Notre Dame, IN	28	University of Texas at Austin, University of California at Berkeley
11	1964	Los Angeles, CA	21	San Jose State University
12	1965	New York, NY	27	University of Toronto
13	1966	State College, PA	27	Massachusetts Institute of Technology
14	1967	Hoboken, NJ	24	University of California at Berkeley
15	1968	Chicago, IL	49	University of Chicago
16	1969	Montreal, QC	43	McGill University
17	1970	Evanston, IL	51	Massachusetts Institute of Technology
18	1971	Toronto, ON	55	Columbia University
19	1972	Columbus, OH	108	University of Chicago
20	1973	Atlanta, GA	73	University of Toronto, University of Chicago
21	1974	Louisville, KY	89	University of Toronto
22	1975	Columbus, OH	123	University of Nebraska–Lincoln, Harvard University
23	1976	New York, NY	108	University of South Florida
24	1977	St. Louis, MO	67	University of Pennsylvania
25	1978	Chicago, IL	85	Yale University
26	1979	Los Angeles, CA	42	University of Florida
27	1980	Atlanta, GA	52	University of Toronto
28	1981	New York, NY	71	University of Toronto
29	1982	Columbus, OH	62	University of Toronto
30	1983	Worcester, MA	59	Yale University
31	1984	Kitchener, ON	59	Columbia University
32	1985	New Brunswick, NJ	60	Rhode Island College
33	1986	Providence, RI	53	University of Chicago, Harvard University
34	1987	Columbus, OH	38	Yale University
35	1988	New Brunswick, NJ	36	Harvard University
36	1989	Salt Lake City, UT	19	University of California at Berkeley, Harvard University
37	1990	Cambridge, MA	30	Harvard University
38	1991	Chicago, IL	33	University of Illinois at Urbana Champaign
39	1992	Detroit, MI	33	University of Minnesota
40	1993	DeLand, FL	31	Borough of Manhattan Community College
41	1994	Providence, RI	31	Borough of Manhattan Community College
42	1995	New York, NY	36	New York University, Brooklyn College
43	1996	Baltimore, MD	36	University of Maryland, Baltimore County
44	1997	Bowling Green, KY	38	Borough of Manhattan Community College
45	1998	Dallas, TX	20	University of Maryland, Baltimore County
46	1999	Toronto, ON	31	University of Maryland, Baltimore County
47	2000	Milwaukee, WI	21	University of Maryland, Baltimore County, University of Texas at Dallas
48	2001	Providence, RI	29	University of Maryland, Baltimore County, University of Texas at Dallas
49	2002	Miami, FL	30	University of Maryland, Baltimore County – B
50	2003	Miami, FL	30	University of Texas at Dallas
51	2004	Wichita, KS	23	University of Texas at Dallas
52	2005	Miami, FL	27	University of Maryland, Baltimore County
53	2006	Washington, DC	24	University of Texas at Dallas – B, University of Texas at Dallas – A
54	2007	Miami, FL	28	University of Texas at Dallas
55	2008	Dallas, TX	29	University of Maryland, Baltimore County, University of Texas at Dallas – B
56	2009	South Padre Island, TX	28	University of Maryland, Baltimore County
57	2010	Milwaukee, WI	28	University of Texas at Dallas
58	2011	Fort Worth, TX	28	University of Texas at Dallas
59	2012	Princeton, NJ	44	University of Texas at Dallas, Webster University – B, University of Maryland, Baltimore County, Webster University – A, University of Illinois at Urbana-Champaign
60	2013	Lubbock, TX	42	Webster University – A
61	2014	South Padre Island, TX	45	Webster University – A
62	2015	Cleveland, OH	42	Texas Tech – A, University of Texas Rio Grande Valley – A, Webster University – B, Columbia University – A
63	2016	New Orleans, LA	60	Webster University – B, Webster University – A
64	2017	Columbus, OH	58	Webster University – A
65	2018	Burlingame, CA	53	Webster University – A
66	2019	Charlotte, NC	63	Texas Tech University – A
67	2020–2021	Chess.com	59	Webster University – A
68	2022	Dulles, VA	57	Saint Louis University – A
69	2023	Seattle, WA	85 - Open: 47, U1800: 38	Open: Webster University – A, U1800: University of Texas at Austin - B
70	2024	McAllen, TX	81 - Open: 40, U1800: 41	Open: University of Missouri - A, U1800: University of Southern California - A
71	2025	Charlotte, NC	91 - Open: 44, U1800: 47	Open: University of Texas Rio Grande Valley - A, U1800: University of Cincinnati, University of Texas at Austin - B, New York University
72	2026	Schaumburg, IL		

=== Individual winners ===
#	Year	Winning Player
1	1945	Kiven Plesset, City College of New York
2	1947	Robert Byrne, Yale University
3	1949	Paul Dietz, University of Pittsburgh
4	1951	James Sherwin, Columbia University
5	1953	Albert Weissman, New York University
6	1955	Edmar Mednis, New York University
7	1957	Charles Kalme, University of Pennsylvania
8	1959	Leslie Ault, Columbia University
9	1961	Larry Gilden, University of Maryland
10	1963	Henry Davis, University of Texas
11	1965	Marc Yoffie, City College of New York
12	1966	John Meyer, Yale
13	1967	Carl Wagner, Massachusetts Institute of Technology
14	1969	Camille Coudari, McGill University

== Records ==
University of Maryland, Baltimore County and the University of Texas at Dallas share the record for most wins: each has won (or tied for first place) at the Pan-Am ten times.

Webster University holds the record for the longest winning streak of seven years: 2012–2018.

Webster University holds the record for the most wins at the President's Cup: 7 wins (2013, 2014, 2015, 2016, 2017, 2023, 2025).

== Bibliography ==
- Edelman, Dan, Pan-American Intercollegiate and High School Team Chess Championships: Official Tournament Rules, Including College Chess Committee Guidelines (January 1993). Official 1993 Version.
- Annual Reports of the USCF College Chess Committee. Available in the Annual Reports of the US Chess Federation.
- Articles about the Pan-Am Intercollegiate published in Chess Life magazine.
- Rating Reports from the Pan-Am Intercollegiate. Available from the US Chess Federation.
- Program booklets from the Pan-Am for some years.
- USCF (2016), 2016 Yearbook (Retrieved 2018-04-06)
