= Kenneth Harkness =

Kenneth Harkness (byname of Stanley Edgar; November 12, 1896 – October 4, 1972) was a chess organizer. He is the creator of the Harkness rating system.

== Life and career ==
He was born in Glasgow, Scotland. He was Business Manager of the United States Chess Federation from 1952 to 1959. He was also the editor of Chess Review, which merged into Chess Life.

He had lived in Boca Raton, Florida. He became an International Arbiter in 1972. He was a member of the FIDE Permanent Rules Commission.

Harkness was responsible for introducing Swiss system tournaments to the United States, and also introduced the Harkness rating system, which was a precursor to the Elo rating system. One method of tiebreaks in Swiss system tournaments is named after him. In the Harkness Method, players tied on points are ranked by the sum of their opponents' scores discarding the top score and the bottom score. For his services, Harkness is in the U.S. Chess Hall of Fame.

With Irving Chernev, Harkness co-wrote An Invitation to Chess. He was responsible for a number of the first American chess rulebooks.

Harkness died on a train in Yugoslavia, on his way to Skopje to be an arbiter at the Chess Olympiad.

== Rating system ==
Harkness devised a rating system that was used by the US Chess Federation from 1950 to 1960. When a player competes in a tournament, the average rating of his competition is calculated. If the player scores 50% he receives the average competition rating as his performance rating. If he scores more than 50% his new rating is the competition average plus 10 points for each percentage point above 50. If he scores less than 50% his new rating is the competition average minus 10 points for each percentage point below 50.

== Bibliography ==
- Harkness, Kenneth (1956), The Official Blue Book and Encyclopedia of Chess
- Harkness, Kenneth (1967), Official Chess Handbook, McKay
- Harkness, Kenneth (1945), An Invitation to Chess, McKay
- Harkness, Kenneth (1970), Official Chess Rulebook, McKay
- Harkness, Kenneth (1950), Invitation to Bridge, McKay

== See also ==
- Chess rating systems
