= President's Cup (chess) =

US college team chess championship

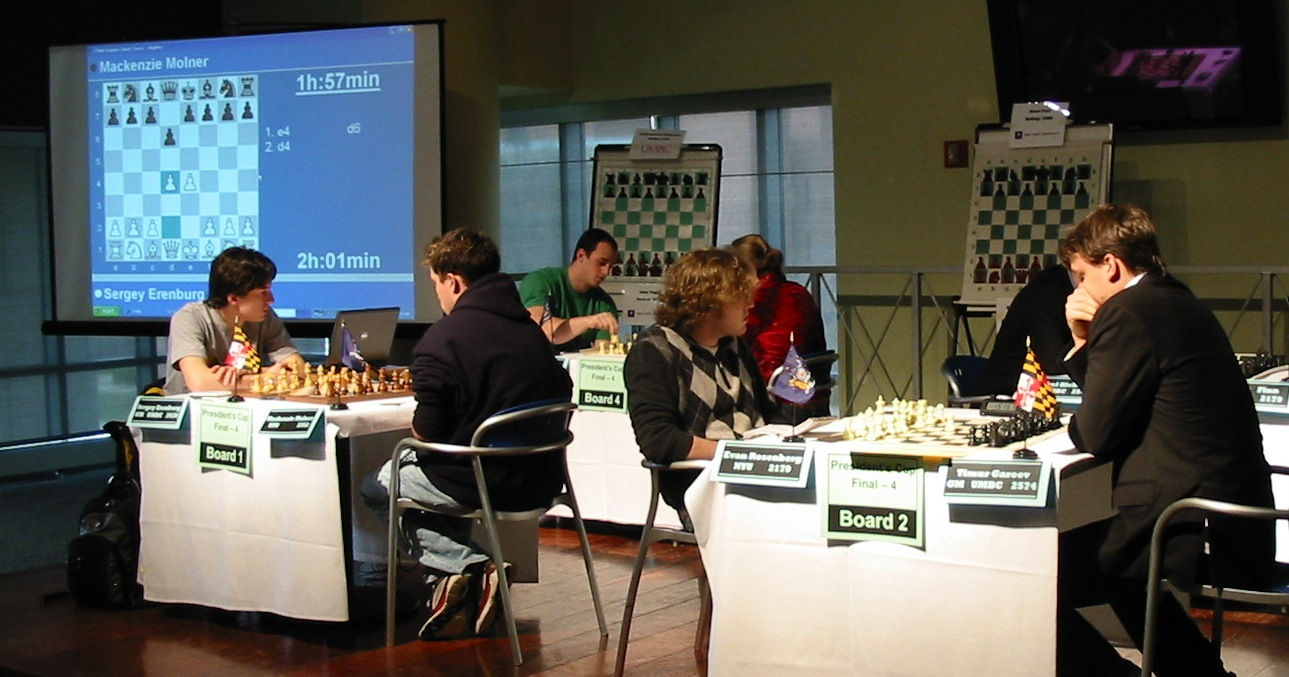
UMBC vs. NYU at 2008 Final Four at UMBC

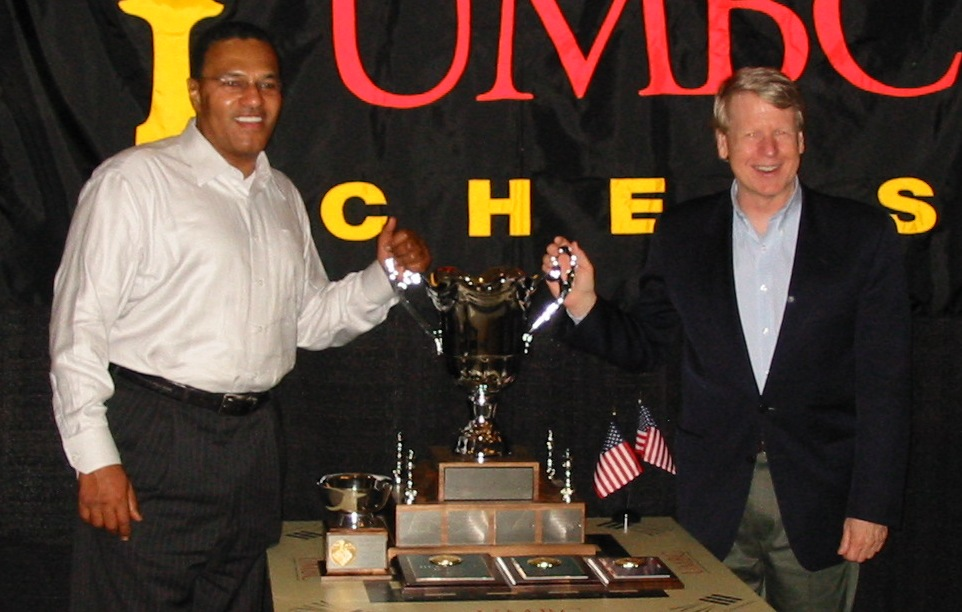
Presidents Freeman Hrabowski of UMBC and David Daniel of UTD hope to gain possession of the President's Cup at the 2008 Final Four. UTD won in 2008.

The President's Cup (informally known as the Final Four of College Chess) determines the U.S. college team chess champion. Hosted in part by the United States Chess Federation (USCF), the President's Cup is an annual invitational team championship, open to the top four U.S. schools from the most recent Pan-American Intercollegiate Team Chess Championship (Pan-Am). It is run as a fixed-roster team round-robin tournament, scored by individual (not team) points. The President's Cup usually takes place in early Spring.

== History ==
The President's Cup has taken place each year in various locations since it was founded in 2001 by Dr. Tim Redman with the financial support of University of Texas at Dallas president Dr. Franklyn Jenifer. Since 2011, the President's Cup has been sponsored in part by Booz Allen Hamilton. The event in 2020 was to be held in April but was cancelled due to the coronavirus pandemic. The Final Four teams that qualified that year were Texas Tech, University of Texas at Dallas, Webster University, and Saint Louis University.

== Rules ==
The governing body for the President's Cup is the College Chess Committee (CCC) of the USCF. The event is rated by the USCF and the International Chess Federation (FIDE) and played under the FIDE Laws of Chess. The CCC has established eligibility requirements for college chess, which apply to both the Pan-American Intercollegiate Championship and the President's Cup.

Each team comprises four players and up to two alternates from the same school campus. The official rules state: "The President's Cup is a Team Round Robin scored by total individual points. In the event of a tie, the teams are declared Co-champions."

In cases where two or more teams finish with the same number of individual game points, they are officially recognized as co-champions. A tiebreak system is used only to determine which co-champion team is awarded the physical President's Cup trophy. This procedure does not affect the official designation of champions, which is based solely on total individual points.

== Significance ==
The winner of the President's Cup is considered the top chess team among U.S. post-secondary schools (colleges, universities, community colleges). By contrast, the Pan-Am determines the top post-secondary school in North American, Central America, South America, or the Caribbean. The winning school takes possession of the perpetual trophy, created in 2008 using funds from Sun Trust Bank, for one year.

== Winners and venues ==
Year	Location	1st place	2nd place	3rd place	4th place	Host	Organizer / Chief TD
2001	Richardson, TX	University of Texas at Dallas (UTD)	University of Maryland, Baltimore County (UMBC)	University of California, Berkeley	Stanford University	UTD	Redman / Salinas
2002	Miami, FL	UTD	UMBC	Stanford	Harvard University	Chess Hall of Fame	Lawrence / Camaratta
2003	Miami, FL	UMBC	UTD	Miami Dade College	University of Chicago	Chess Hall of Fame	Lawrence / Gerzadowicz
2004	Lindsborg, KS	UMBC	UTD	Miami Dade	MIT	Karpov School of Chess	Korenman / Bowman
2005	Lindsborg, KS	UMBC	UTD	Miami Dade	Stanford	Karpov School of Chess	Korenman / Bowman
2006	Richardson, TX	UMBC	UTD	Miami Dade	Duke	UTD	Stallings / Guadalupe
2007	Richardson, TX	UTD	UMBC	Miami Dade	Duke	UTD	Stallings / Snead
2008	Baltimore, MD	UTD	UMBC	Miami Dade	New York University (NYU)	UMBC	Sherman / Atkins
2009	Richardson, TX	UMBC	UTD	University of Texas at Brownsville (UTB, now UTRGV)	Stanford	UTD	Stallings / Haskel
2010	Brownsville, TX	UMBC	UTB (now UTRGV)	Texas Tech University (TTU)	UTD	Brownsville	Harwood / Berry
2011	Herndon, VA	Texas Tech	UTD	UTB (now UTRGV)	UMBC	Booz Allen Hamilton	Herman / Hoffpauir
2012	Herndon, VA	Texas Tech	UMBC & UTD (tie)	UMBC & UTD (tie)	NYU	Booz Allen Hamilton	Herman / Hoffpauir
2013	Rockville, MD	Webster University (Webster)	UTD	UMBC	University of Illinois	Booz Allen Hamilton	Herman / Hoffpauir
2014	New York, NY	Webster	UMBC	TTU	University of Illinois	New York Athletic Club	Booz Allen, Herman, Sifer / Hoffpauir
2015	New York, NY	Webster	UTD	TTU	UMBC	New York Athletic Club	Booz Allen, Herman / Hoffpauir
2016	New York, NY	Webster	University of Texas Rio Grande Valley (UTRGV)	Texas Tech	Columbia University	Marshall Chess Club	Two Sigma, Booz Allen, Herman / Hoffpauir
2017	New York, NY	Webster	TTU	St. Louis University (SLU)	UTD	Marshall Chess Club	Two Sigma, Booz Allen, Herman / Garcia
2018	New York, NY	UTRGV	Webster	TTU	SLU	Marshall Chess Club	Two Sigma, Booz Allen, Herman / Garcia
2019	New York, NY	UTRGV	Webster	UTD	Harvard University	Marshall Chess Club	Two Sigma, Booz Allen, Herman / Garcia
2021	Online	UTRGV	SLU	Webster	TTU	Internet Chess Club	US Chess / Langland
2022	Lubbock, TX	SLU	Webster	UTD	TTU	Texas Tech University	Onischuk / Bird
2023	Saint Louis, MO	Webster	SLU	UTRGV	University of Missouri (Mizzou)	Webster University	Liem Quang Le / Bird
2024	Richardson, TX	Mizzou	Webster	UTRGV	UTD	UTD	Steiner / Reed
2025	Richardson, TX	Webster (co-champions)	UTRGV (co-champions)	SLU	UTD	UTD	Sadorra / Reed
2026	Columbia, MO	Mizzou	SLU	UTRGV	Webster	Mizzou	

=== Number of Wins ===
School	Wins	Year
Webster University (program discontinued in 2026)	7	2013, 2014, 2015, 2016, 2017, 2023, 2025
University of Maryland, Baltimore County	6	2003, 2004, 2005, 2006, 2009, 2010
University of Texas Rio Grande Valley	4	2018, 2019, 2021, 2025
University of Texas at Dallas	4	2001, 2002, 2007, 2008
University of Missouri (Mizzou)	2	2024, 2026
Texas Tech University	2	2011, 2012
Saint Louis University	1	2022

== Bibliography ==
- Annual Reports of the USCF College Chess Committee
- Articles about the President's Cup published in Chess Life magazine
- "Rating Reports from the President's Cup". US Chess Federation.
- Program booklets from the President's Cup for some years.
