= Al Lawrence (chess writer) =

Albert J. "Al" Lawrence (born 1947 in Illinois) is an American chess expert and author.

After volunteering for duty in the US Army in Vietnam during 1968–1969, where he was awarded the Bronze Star for his service, Lawrence returned to the University of Missouri-Columbia, earning graduate degrees in English literature and education. After teaching school in Lincoln, Nebraska, he came to work for the United States Chess Federation in 1981. In 1988 he was appointed Executive Director.

During his time in office, Lawrence greatly increased both the membership and the revenues of the USCF. Membership rose from about 50,000 to 84,000 and annual sales and revenues rose from less than $4 million to more than $6.5 million, which is still a record. Lawrence was especially effective in increasing sales of books and equipment, which he helped grow to over $3.5 million annually.

Lawrence later became Vice President of Excalibur Electronics in Miami. Excalibur also maintained the World Chess Hall of Fame, for which Lawrence served as volunteer executive director. In 2009, he helped move the Hall's artifacts to its current location in St. Louis. In 2012 Lawrence became director of the Texas Tech Chess Program, which was suddenly left without a competitive team when former director Susan Polgar took the championship squad to Webster University. (College chess is not governed by NCAA rules.) By December 2013, the new Tech team had qualified for the Final Four of College Chess and continued to qualify through 2015, when Lawrence left Texas Tech University to become managing director of the U.S. Chess Trust. In December 2015, Texas Tech University won the Pan-American Intercollegiate Team Chess Championships for the first time in its history.

Lawrence is the author of 12 books on a variety of nonfiction topics, including chess and astronomy and is a monthly columnist and feature writer for Chess Life magazine. He served as a World Book Encyclopedia Yearbook contributor for more than 20 years. Lawrence won the Chess Journalist of the Year Award in 2000 from the Chess Journalists of America. In rare repeats of this honor, Lawrence was again named Chess Journalist of the Year in 2016 and again in 2019. In September 2017, he was listed by the U.S. Chess Federation among the top 100 active US players 65 and over. In March 2025, Lawrence was inducted into the New York State Chess Hall of Fame.
