= Gene Hoffman =

Gene Hoffman may refer to:

- Gene L. Hoffman, American educator and member of the Illinois House of Representatives
- Gene Lyle Hoffman, member of the Iowa Senate

== See also ==
- Jean Hoffman (disambiguation)
