= Charles Hertan =

American chess player (born 1960)

Personal information
- Born: March 11, 1960 (age 66)

Chess career
- Country: United States
- Title: FIDE Master (1982)
- Peak rating: 2410 (July 1996)

Charles E. Hertan (born March 11, 1960) is an American chess player and author of seven chess books, including Forcing Chess Moves (New In Chess, 2008), winner of the 2008 Chess Café Book of the Year award. His two-part children's chess tactics manual, Power Chess for Kids, Volumes 1&2, won similar accolades from chess journalists and educators. In 2024 Hertan published his book about Paul Morphy (1837–1884), the great American chess champion. The Real Paul Morphy. His Life and Chess Games (2024), is a comprehensive biography and analysis of important chess games of Morphy. Hertan won both the New England Chess Championship and the Eastern US Masters Championship twice, along with numerous other tournaments, achieving peak ratings of 2515 USCF and 2410 FIDE. He also holds a master's in social work and worked for 15 years as a therapist and administrator in outpatient mental health clinics. Hertan lives in Northampton, Massachusetts with his wife Rhonda and daughter, Emma.

== History ==
The son of businessman Donald Hertan (1932–2016) and poet/artist Lynn Kernan (1934–2002), Hertan grew up in New Jersey along with his older sister, artist Beth Fidoten. At age eight his mother left home, leaving him and his sister in the care of their father. Soon afterwards his mother broke her spine and developed a debilitating chronic pain condition. Charles and his family were massively impacted by these events, leading him to develop a lifelong interest in the effects of trauma, especially on men, and how humans cope with and recover from such painful events. His father remarried twice, and Charles has 4 step- and half-siblings from these marriages. His stepmother Barbara Kaplan, along with his mother's cousin Jane Lynn, were strong early influences.

Hertan discovered tournament chess at age 13 via his best friend, Stephen Feinberg (who later founded Cerberus Financial group and become a multi-billionaire). A relative late-bloomer, Hertan achieved the Senior Chessmaster title at age 16, and went on to achieve four International Master Norms at the 1981 Frank J. Marshall International Tournament (equal first), the 1983-84 CCA Winter International (tied for 3rd), the 1984 New York and the Hastings Open 1993–94, though he failed to get the IM title on a technicality.

In 1990 he married his first wife Jayme Shorin, the granddaughter of Topps Sports Card founder Abe Shorin, but they divorced three year later. Shorin went on to become an expert in the field of recovery from abuse and trauma, working at the Victims of Violence Program at Cambridge Hospital in Massachusetts. Hertan moved to the Northampton area post-divorce, where he eventually met and married educator Rhonda Cohen, Ph.D. in 2013.

Hertan reconciled with both parents later in their lives, and after his mother's death he compiled and edited a book of her poetry, Dream Catcher: Selected Poems by Lynn Kernan. Illustrations included original artwork by Kernan and his sister Beth Fidoten, as well as his own nature photography (which was frequently exhibited in Western Massachusetts) and a photograph by world-renowned cave photographer Kevin Downey (used by permission).

Hertan has also maintained a career as a numismatist (coin dealer), remaining an active agent in the New England, National (US) and online coin markets.

== Bibliography ==
- Dream Catcher: Selected Poems by Lynn Kernan, Edited by Charlie Hertan, 2006, Bunny and Crocodile Press, Washington, D.C.
- Forcing Chess Moves, Charles Hertan, 2008, New In Chess, Alkmaar, Netherlands, ISBN 978-90-5691-856-9
- Power Chess for Kids: Learn How to Think Ahead and Become One of the Best Players in Your School, Charles Hertan, 2011, New In Chess, Alkmaar, Netherlands, ISBN 978-90-5691-330-4
- Power Chess for Kids, Volume 2, Charles Hertan, 2013, New In Chess, Alkmaar, Netherlands, ISBN 978-90-5691-433-2
- Basic Chess Openings for Kids, Charles Hertan, 2015, New In Chess, Alkmaar, Netherlands, ISBN 978-90-5691-597-1
- Start Playing Chess: Learn the Rules to the Royal Game, Charles Hertan, 2016, New In Chess, Alkmaar, Netherlands
- Strike Like Judit!: The Winning Tactics of Chess Legend Judit Polgar, Charles Hertan, 2018, New In Chess, Alkmaar, NetherlandS, ISBN 978-90-5691-770-8
- The Real Paul Morphy. His Life and Chess Games, Charles Hertan, 2024, New In Chess, Alkmaar, Netherlands, ISBN 978-90-833788-0-0

== See also ==
- List of chess books
