= Denis Barry =

American chess player (1929–2003)

Denis J. Barry (June 2, 1929 – December 20, 2003, in Tucson, Arizona) was president of the United States Chess Federation from 1993 to 1996. He was an enthusiastic chess organizer, best known for establishing the US Amateur Team East Chess Championship, which is held annually in Parsippany, New Jersey, and which remains one of the most popular USCF events. Barry was the captain and guide for the US Blind Team in three Blind Chess Olympiads. He also organized the third USCF Blind Championship in 1977, and was the first to use Braille wallcharts at that tournament.
