= Leroy Dubeck =

- Born: Leroy William Dubeck; March 1, 1939 (age 87); Orange, New Jersey, U.S.

Academic background
- Education: Rutgers University (PhD)

Academic work
- Discipline: Physics
- Institutions: Temple University

Leroy William Dubeck (born March 1, 1939) is an American chess master and retired professor of physics. He was president of the United States Chess Federation (USCF) from 1969 to 1972. Dubeck also writes science fiction.

== Career ==
=== Academic ===
Dubeck is on the Faculty Committee of Temple University. He holds a PhD in physics from Rutgers University. He joined the Temple faculty in 1965, and retired in December 2012. He has served on dozens of senate, college and departmental committees including 15 years on the Faculty Senate Budget Review Committee, three years on the former Faculty Senate Research and Study Leaves Committee and served on the University Study Leaves Committee. He is the recipient of the Stauffer Award for service to Temple University.

He has been twice acting chair of the physics department and former chair of the Collegial Assembly of Temple's college of science and technology. he is the author/co-author of six college textbooks and has been active in curricular improvements in science courses. He developed and teaches the only completely online course offered by the physics department. He has been the recipient of more than 20 grants, mostly from the National Science Foundation.

=== Chess ===
Dubeck was president of the United States Chess Federation from 1969 to 1972. He was instrumental in getting Bobby Fischer to play his match for the 1972 World Chess Championship against Boris Spassky, although the match took place after his term of office was over. A life member of the USCF, he is a former chair of USCF's Life Members Assets Committee, and a Trustee of the US Chess Trust.

At chess, he plays the Smith–Morra Gambit. He is rated 2324 by FIDE.

== Selected publications ==
- Finding the facts in science fiction films, L. W. Dubeck, S. E. Moshier, M. H. Bruce, and J. E. Boss, The Science Teacher 60, April, 1993
- Fantastic voyages: learning science through science fiction films, L. W. Dubeck, S. E. Moshier, and J. E. Boss, textbook published by the American Institute of Physics (1993). ISBN 1-56396-195-4
- Instructor's manual for fantastic voyages: learning science through science fiction films, L. W. Dubeck, S. E. Moshier and J. E. Boss, American Institute of Physics (1993).
- A world view of environmental issues, L. W. Dubeck, F. Higgins, R. Patterson, R. Tatlow, C. Ward and B.Wright, Saunders College Press, (1995), 2nd edition (1998). ISBN 0-03-024262-2
- Using STAR TREK: The Next Generation television Episodes to Teach Science, L. W. Dubeck and R. Tatlow, Jour. of College Science Teaching, 319 (1998).
- Budget handbook for college faculty and staff, L. W. Dubeck, National Education Association 2nd edition (1996), 3rd edition (1998).
- Budget Handbook for Association Leaders in Higher Education Units, Leroy Dubeck, book published by the National Education Association (2002).
- Threats to Humanity (2007), Leroy Dubeck and Suzanne E. Moshier, Ishi Press ISBN 0-923891-56-0
- Fantastic Voyages 2nd Edition, Leroy Dubeck, Suzanne E. Moshier and Judith E. Bass, book published by Springer Verlag (2004).
- Science in Cinema: Teaching Science Fact Through Science Fiction Film ISBN 0-8077-2915-9
- College & University Budgeting: An Introduction for Faculty and Academic Administrators ISBN 0-915164-22-1
- Collective bargaining: A view from the faculty (Orientation paper - Academic Collective Bargaining Information Service)
- Temple University collective bargaining experience
- Budget handbook for association leaders in higher education units: Budget analysis for faculty and staff
