= Don Schultz =

American chess official (1936–2020)

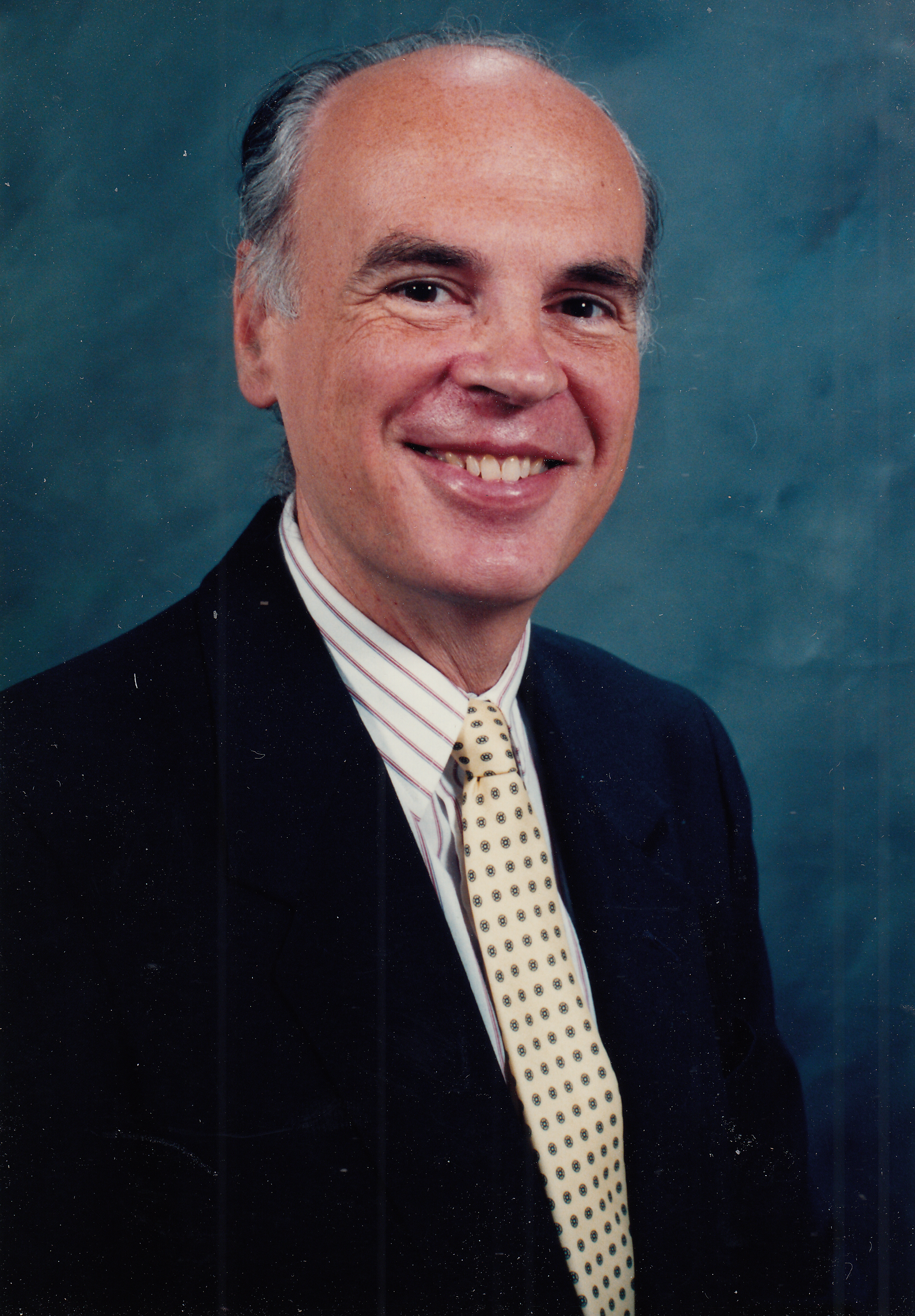
Donald D. Schultz

Donald Schultz (May 13, 1936, Woodhaven, Queens, New York – April 20, 2020, New Jersey) was a president and a vice-president of the United States Chess Federation (USCF). He was elected vice-president on August 14, 2005. He was defeated by the Susan Polgar-Paul Truong slate when he ran for re-election in July, 2007. He was a rated chess expert.

== Chess organizer and official ==
Although an expert chess player, Schultz's greatest joy came in bringing people together through the many chess tournaments that he either organized or helped with. Schultz and his family were traveling from their home in Brussels, Belgium in 1971 to the United States to visit family when they stopped in Reykjavik, Iceland to see the Fischer/Spassky tournament. Bobby Fischer was a friend and asked him to stay on as one of his allowed council of three. This was the beginning of Schultz's foray into the world of international chess. Over the next several decades, he traveled around the world for chess conferences and tournaments, often accompanied by his wife, Teresa Russ Schultz.

Schultz first ran for USCF President in 1966, but was defeated by Marshall Rohland. In 1981, Schultz was appointed U.S. Delegate to FIDE, the World Chess Federation. In 1982, in Thessaloniki, Schultz was elected to the Executive Council of FIDE.

In 1992, he was elected to the Policy Board of the USCF. In 1993, he organized a tour for the Israel Youth Chess Team to the US. In 1993 and 1994 he, along with Yasser Seirawan, ran a chess school for children in Fond du Lac, Wisconsin. In 1996, Schultz was elected President of the USCF for a three-year term. In 2003, Schultz was elected to the Executive Board of the USCF for a four-year term. He is the author of two books, "Chessdon" and "Fischer, Kasparov and the Others". He has held numerous political positions in chess.

Schultz died on April 20, 2020, in Emerson, New Jersey from complications caused by the COVID-19 virus.

== State Associations ==
- President, NYS Chess Association 1964-1965
- President, North Carolina Chess Association 1966–1971
- President, Georgia Chess Association 1977–1979
- President, Florida Chess Association – 1987 -1993
- Elected Honorary Lifetime Member Florida Chess Association Board of Directors in 1996.
- Editor floridaCHESS 1994 to 1996. Won numerous awards including Best State publication in 1995 and 1996.
- FIDE Delegate: 1983 to 1989 and 1993
- FIDE Zonal President: 1982, 1993 to 1994
- FIDE Executive Board; 1982 to 1990
- Attended 21 FIDE Congresses (1972, 1974, 1978 to 1991, 1993, 1994, 2000, 2002 and 2005).

== Major Tournaments Organized ==
- 1963 NYS Championship – Poughkeepsie, NY
- 1962 U.S. 30/30 Championship, Poughkeepsie, NY
- 1967 U.S. Junior Open, Raleigh, NC
- 1969 North Carolina Invitational, Raleigh, NC
- 1990 World Youth Chess Championships, Fond du Lac, WI
- 1991 U.S. Women's Championship, Highland Beach, FL
- 1993 Amateur Team Finals, Baltimore, MD
- 1994 US Championship, Key West, FL
- 1996 New York Invitational, NYC (one of the strongest round robins ever held in U.S.)
- 2005 U.S. Senior Open in Boca Raton, Florida

== Other Major Event Organized ==
- 1981 FIDE Congress in Atlanta: (only FIDE Congress ever held in the U.S.)

== Other Key Positions ==
- FIDE Executive Council 1982 to 1990
- Co-Chair FIDE UNESCO Commission- 1981, 82
- USCF Executive Board Member: 1992 to 1995
- USCF President: 1996 to 1999
- USCF Secretary: 2004, 05
- USCF Vice President: 2005 – 2007
- Chess for Peace Advisory Board: 2005 -

== Books ==
- Schultz, Don (1999). Chessdon. Chess Don. ISBN 0-9670775-0-8.
- Fischer, Kasparov and Others ISBN 0-9670775-1-6
