= Golden Knights (chess) =

The Golden Knights is the United States open correspondence chess championship. It is held annually by the United States Chess Federation (USCF), and is open to all members of the USCF residing in the United States or who have an APO or FPO address. It was first held in 1943 under the name Victory Tournament, the next year it was called the Postal Chess Championship and in 1945 it was finally renamed as the Golden Knights tournament. The 69th annual Golden Knights tournament began in 2016. About 200 players typically participate in each tournament.

The tournament is played in three stages: the preliminaries, semi-finals, and finals. At each stage, the participants are divided into a number of seven-player sections, with each participant playing one game (three with White, three with Black) against every other player in the section. Each participant plays in the preliminaries, playing in a section with players having a wide range of ratings. The top finishers in the preliminaries advance to the semi-finals. The top players in the semi-finals advance to the finals. A score of 5-1 or better was previously required to advance from the preliminaries to the semi-finals, or from the semi-finals to the finals, but since at least the 2001 tournament, 4.5 points has been sufficient. A player's score is determined by her weighted-point total, which is determined by multiplying her score at each stage by a coefficient that weighs later results more heavily than earlier results. The coefficient used for each point in the finals (4.5) is slightly more than twice that used for each point in the semi-finals (2.2), which is slightly more than twice that used for each point in the preliminaries (1). Thus, a player who wins all of his games except for one draw in the preliminaries will have a higher weighted-point total (45.70) than a player who won all of his games except for a draw in the semi-finals (45.10), and both of those players will have a lower weighted-point total than a player who won all of his games except for a draw in the finals (43.55). The weighted-point system ensures that no player will be able to coast home with a series of draws, and enables a player who is behind to make up a lot of ground with a strong result in the finals.

== Golden Knights Champions ==
#	Year	Winner
-	1943	John H. Staffer
-	1944	Marvin C. Palmer
1	1945	Charles F. Rehberg
2	1946	Richard L. Aikin
3	1947-1948	Leon Stolzenberg
4	1949	James T. Sherwin
5	1950	Leon Stolzenberg
6	1951	John H. Staffer
7	1952-1953	Ignaz Zalys
8	1954	Reuben Klugman
9	1955	Hans Berliner
10	1956	Hans Berliner
11	1957	Raymond Doe
12	1958	J. Whiteczak
13	1959	Hans Berliner
14	1960	Leon Stolzenberg
15	1961-1962	Lionel B. Joyner
16	1963	Gary R. Abram
17	1964	Anton Sildmets
18	1965	Brian E. Owens
19	1966	Harry Mayer
20	1967	William F. Gray
21	1968	Kenneth Collins
22	1969	Robert H. Burns
23	1970	Juris Jurevics
24	1971	Robert G. Cross
25	1972	Richard A. Cayford
26	1973	Bill Maillard; Richard Cayford; George Krauss
27	1974	Ben Bednarz
28	1975	Rob Salgado
29	1976	K. Redinger
30	1977	Tom Sweeney
31	1978	Richard Aiken; Walter Milbratz
32	1979	Tom Friedel
33	1980	Gary Kubach
34	1981	Tom Friedel
35	1982	S. Kowalski; S. Sinding; Meeks Vaughan
36	1983	Rob Salgado
37	1984	Edmund Hermelyn
38	1985	Andre Reichman
39	1986	Mike Colucci; George Kirby; J. Timms
40	1987	Stanley J. Elowitch
41	1988	Michael P. Decker
42	1989	Jon Applebee
43	1990	Murray Kurtz; John Penquite
44	1991	Joseph A. Schwing
45	1992	Edward P. Duliba; Charles Van Buskirk
46	1993	Anthony D. Eaker
47	1994	Robert B. Ilderton
48	1995	Robert F. Keating
49	1996	Robert F. Keating
50	1997	Chris O'Connell
51	1998	Leonard "Corky" Schakel
52	1999	John Burton
53	2000	Abe Wilson
54	2001	John Burton
55	2002	Chuck Cullum
56	2003	John Menke
57	2004	Chuck Cullum
58	2005	Abe Wilson
59	2006	Michael Buss; James Tracz
60	2007	Daniel Woodard
61	2008	James Rhodes
62	2009	Wilbur Tseng
63	2010	Michael Buss
64	2011	James Tracz
65	2012	Michael Buss
66	2013	Gary Adams
