= Jean L. Hoffman =

American chess player

- Born: 1980 (age 45–46); Tucson, Arizona
- Education: Masters in Urban Education
- Alma mater: Yale University; Harvard University
- Occupations: Social entrepreneur Educator
- Known for: First female executive director of the United States Chess Federation

Jean L. Hoffman (born 1980) is a social entrepreneur, educator and long-time official in the non-profit community from Tucson, Arizona. Hoffman built and has led numerous chess-related non-profit organizations and worked to extend the benefits of chess to underserved and underrepresented communities throughout the United States. Hoffman served as the first female executive director of the United States Chess Federation from 2013-2017.

== Background and education ==
Hoffman, born in Tucson, Arizona, attended the Gregory School from 1993 to 1999, later serving as a member of the board of trustees. In 1995 she led the three member team to win the United States National Chess Championship. Jean attended Yale University earning a bachelor's degree in History. Following her graduation she worked for the New York City nonprofit organization Chess in the Schools. In 2007, she earned a master's degree in Urban Education from Harvard University.

== Career ==
=== US Chess Federation ===
In 2014, Hoffman assumed the role as the first female Executive Director of the US Chess Federation. During her tenure at US Chess until October 2017, chess in the United States experienced a resurgence as evidenced by growing membership in US Chess, record-breaking scholastic tournament participation including the hosting of the SuperNationals VI as the largest over-the-board chess tournament in history, and the transfer of more players to the US than any other country ultimately resulting in the United States winning the 2016 World Chess Olympiad for the first time in forty years. In addition, Hoffman is also credited with leading the organization to achieve financial stability for the first time in several decades, spearheading a strategic rebranding and name change process to US Chess, and successfully transitioning from a 510(c)4 to a 501(c)3 organization.

=== Other non-profit and for-profit positions ===
In 2008, Hoffman along with two-time US Women's Champion Jennifer Shahade co-founded the nonprofit organization 9 Queens dedicated to empowering women and at-risk youth through chess. 9 Queens and its educational programing gained local, state and national attention appearing in articles in newspapers across the country including the New York Times and NPR.

Hoffman also served as general manager of the online communities Chesspark and WuChess.com- the world's first and only online hip hop chess community founded by RZA from hip hop group the Wu-Tang Clan.
