= Chess Life =

US periodical

- Cover of the September 2015 issue
- Frequency: Monthly (Chess Life), bi-monthly (Chess Life Kids)
- Founded: 1946 (Chess Life)
- Company: United States Chess Federation
- Country: United States
- Based in: Crossville, Tennessee
- Language: English
- Website: www.uschess.org
- ISSN: 0197-260X

The monthly Chess Life and bi-monthly Chess Life Kids (formerly School Mates and Chess Life for Kids) are the official magazines published by the United States Chess Federation (US Chess). Chess Life is advertised as the "most widely read chess magazine in the world", and reaches more than a quarter of a million readers each month. It focuses on American chess players and tournaments, instruction, human interest, and US Chess governance matters. Chess Life Kids is geared towards those under 14. A subscription to Chess Life and Chess Life Kids is currently one benefit of becoming a US Chess member or affiliate. All members are given access to the online versions of Chess Life and Chess Life Kids (including back issues). Affiliates and some membership categories also receive printed copies of Chess Life and/or Chess Life Kids.

== History ==
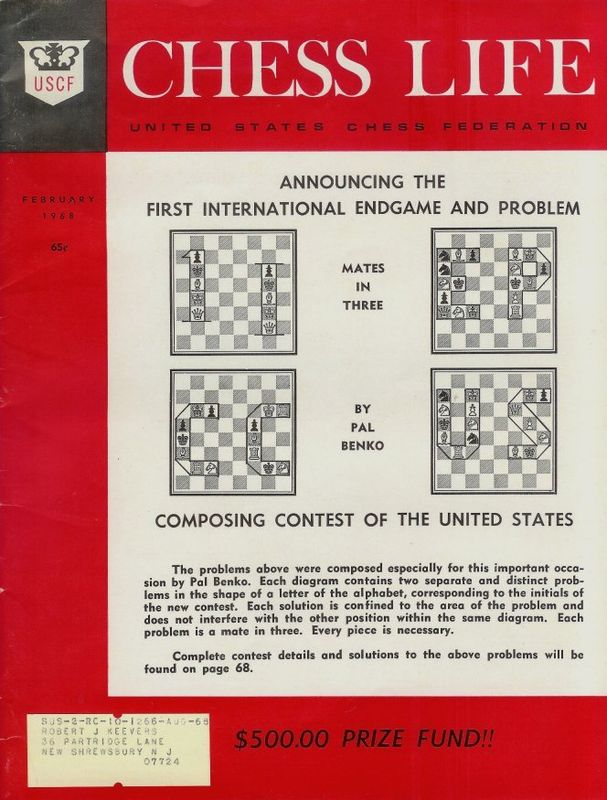
Chess Life, February 1968, cover before the merger with Chess Review

The United States Chess Federation was incorporated on December 27, 1939. In the early years, it had no office and no publication. In 1945 and 1946, USCF Annual books were published. In 1946, publication of Chess Life started as a bi-weekly newspaper, usually eight or twelve pages long. In 1961, Frank Brady converted Chess Life to a slick-covered magazine. In 1969, Chess Life merged with Chess Review, the other leading U.S. chess magazine. The magazine was published under the title Chess Life & Review starting with the November 1969 issue until 1980 when it returned to the name Chess Life.

== Editors of Chess Life ==
- 05/1946–12/1957 Montgomery Major
- 01/1958-12/1960 Fred M. Wren
- 01/1961–12/1961 Frank Brady
- 01/1962–05/1966 J. F. Reinhardt
- 06/1966–11/1966 Ed Edmondson and Bill Goichberg
- 12/1966–––––––– Burt Hochberg and Ed Edmondson
- 01/1967–10/1979 Burt Hochberg
- 11/1979–01/1982 Fairfield W. Hoban
- 02/1982–12/1984 Frank Elley
- 01/1985–03/1988 Larry Parr
- 04/1988–––––––– Fairfield W. Hoban
- 05/1988–07/1989 Don Maddox
- 08/1989–––––––– Boris Baczynskyj
- 09/1989–10/1990 Julie Ann Desch
- 11/1990–10/2000 Glenn Petersen
- 11/2000–10/2003 Peter Kurzdorfer
- 11/2003–12/2003 Glenn Petersen
- 01/2004–03/2005 Kalev Pehme
- 04/2005–02/2006 Glenn Petersen
- 10/2005–02/2006 Gerald Dullea
- 03/2006–05/2018 Daniel Lucas
- 06/2018-05/2020 Melinda Matthews
- 06/2020-present John Hartmann

== Contributors to Chess Life ==
Some of the notable chess authors and players to write for Chess Life:

- Lev Alburt Back to Basics
- Leonard Barden (1960s)
- Pal Benko In the Arena (1972–1981), Endgame Lab (1981–2013), and chess problem column Benko's Bafflers
- David L. Brown Key Krackers
- Robert Byrne
- John W. Collins (1950s and 1960s) Games by USCF Members
- Alex Dunne The Check is in the Mail
- Larry Evans Evans on Chess
- Bobby Fischer (June 1963 debut) Fischer Talks Chess
- Svetozar Gligorić Game of the Month
- Garry Kasparov (1993–1994)
- Irina Krush
- Paul Keres (1968–1975) Keres Annotates...
- Lisa Lane
- Al Lawrence Former USCF Executive director and co-author of more than a dozen books
- Robert Lincoln Easy Does It (chess problems)
- William Lombardy (1958–1960s) Tidbits of Master Play
- Abby Marshall
- Edmar Mednis
- Daniel Naroditsky Endgame Column
- Frank Niro Contributed at least one article, game, letter or photo to the magazine in each of the past five decades.
- Luděk Pachman Pachman On the Openings
- Bruce Pandolfini Solitaire Chess
- Susan Polgar Opening Secrets
- Miro Radojcic Observation Point
- Samuel Reshevsky The Art of Positional Play
- Michael Rohde (1991–2006) Game of the Month
- Jennifer Shahade
- Andy Soltis Chess to Enjoy
- Kester Svendsen
- László Szabó (1970s) Games from Recent Events

== See also ==
- List of chess periodicals
- United States Chess Federation
