= Frank Brady (writer) =

American writer, editor, biographer and educator

Frank Brady (born March 15, 1934, in Brooklyn, New York City), is an American writer, editor, biographer and educator. Former chairman of the Department of Mass Communications, Journalism, Television and Film at St. John's University, New York, he is founding editor of Chess Life magazine.

== Biography ==
Brady was chairman of the Department of Mass Communications, Journalism, Television and Film at St. John's University, New York. He was professor of communication arts and journalism at that university. He was also an adjunct professor of journalism for many years at Barnard College of Columbia University. He has a Bachelor of Science, State University of New York at Albany; Master of Fine Arts, Columbia University; Master of Arts, Ph.D., New York University.

In 1960, Brady was the founding editor of Chess Life as a magazine. (Previously, it had been a newspaper.) He was later editor of Chessworld Magazine and he still later worked as an editor for Ralph Ginzburg and Hugh Hefner. He is an International Arbiter, recognized by FIDE, the World Chess Federation, and has directed many major chess tournaments. He was secretary of the United States Chess Federation 2003–2005.

He has written many books, on a variety of subjects. He is chairman of a department at St. John's University, overseeing a multimillion-dollar budget, 60 faculty, and 900 students.

He served as arbiter of international chess tournaments in 2001 and 2004 in New York. He has been elected to, and serves as an active voting member of the British Academy of Film and Television Arts, and PEN, the international writers' organization.

He is a writer, editor and publisher of international renown. He wrote one of the best-selling chess books in history, Profile of a Prodigy, the biography of Bobby Fischer, as well as countless other books and articles on chess and other subjects. A new biography of Fischer entitled Endgame: The Spectacular Rise and Fall of Bobby Fischer was published in 2011. He has been involved with radio and film projects. His wife, Maxine, also writes books.

On June 18, 2007, Brady was elected president of the Marshall Chess Club.

== Publications ==
- Bobby Fischer: Profile of a Prodigy (1965) ISBN 0-486-25925-0
- Chess: How to Improve Your Technique (1974) ISBN 0-531-02730-9
- Hefner (1974) ISBN 0-02-514600-9
- Onassis: An Extravagant Life (1977) ISBN 0-13-634378-3
- Brady & Lawless's Favorite Bookstores (1978) ISBN 0-8362-7902-6
- Barbra: An Illustrated Biography (1979) ISBN 0-448-16534-1
- Citizen Welles: A Biography of Orson Welles (1989) ISBN 0-385-26759-2
- How To Get Rich With A 1-800 Number (1997) ISBN 0-06-098714-6
- The Publisher: Paul Block, A Life of Friendship, Power, and Politics (2000) ISBN 0-7618-1889-8
- Endgame: The Spectacular Rise and Fall of Bobby Fischer (2011) ISBN 978-0-307-46390-6

== See also ==
- Presidents of the United States Chess Federation
- Executive Directors of the United States Chess Federation
