= Jerry Spann =

American chess organizer

Spann, photographed in the late 1950s or early 1960s

Jerry Garland Spann (August 13, 1912 – January 5, 1968) was an American chess administrator and businessman. He served as president of the United States Chess Federation (USCF) from 1957 to 1960 and also served as a vice-president of FIDE. He is credited with saving the USCF from bankruptcy. The Jerry Spann Memorial Tournament is held in Oklahoma each year in his honor.

== Early life ==
Spann was born on August 13, 1912 in North Carolina. He attended college at the University of Southern California, graduating in 1933. He participated in track and field as well as football. It was at this time he met and became a life-long friend of John Wayne. He chose USC over the University of Oklahoma because OU did not offer football scholarships in those early days and Jerry desired to receive a scholarship. He played blocking back for the All-American halfback Erny Pinckert. His team won the 1932 Rose Bowl game against Tulane University when Spann assisted Pinckert with blocks that allowed USC to pull off a pair of double reverses that produced touchdown runs. Spann was on the USC team when they won the 1930 Rose Bowl game against the University of Pittsburgh.

== Later years ==
During World War II, he served as a Navy officer reaching the rank of Lt. Commander in the aviation branch. He met his wife Alice, who died in 2011, while serving in the Navy. Born to the couple were four daughters: Toni Spann Fuller, Jeri Spann, Susan Spann, and Cathy Spann. After the war, he relocated to Oklahoma City to open what would soon become a prosperous building supply firm named Bissell Builders Supply. He expanded the business by opening stores in Norman, where he had his residence, as well as Tulsa. The firm specialized with their patented revolving door, many of which were sold to hotels and large office buildings.

== Work as chess administrator ==
Spann's successful promotion of the 1956 U.S. Open Chess Championship, held in downtown Oklahoma City, led to his appointment as chairman of the USCF Presidency Nominating Committee. When ten of the eleven people nominated withdrew, Spann—as the stand-alone remaining nominee—was elected as the president of the USCF in 1957, a post he held until 1960. He also served as a FIDE vice-president around this same time period. While at the helm as the USCF president, Spann managed to bring financial solvency back to the struggling chess organization. During his time with the USCF, membership numbers soared by more than 10,000 new members.

== Death and legacy ==
The late Oklahoma chess organizer and player, Frank K. Berry, said of Spann: "All Oklahomans, Americans and people around the world who met him and played in his tournaments will never forget how generous, friendly, encouraging and kind he was." International Master George Koltanowski said of Spann: "He was the heart and soul of American chess." Spann died of cancer, aged 55, on January 5, 1968, and to this day the Oklahoma Open (state championship for Oklahoma residents) proudly bears his name in memorial.
