= Irving Chernev =

American chess player and author (1900–1981)

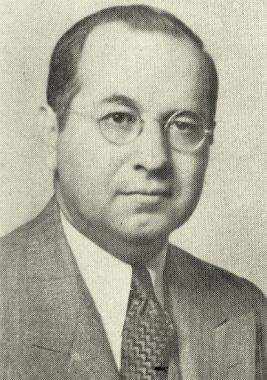
- Chernev in 1927
- Born: January 29, 1900; Priluki, Russian Empire
- Died: September 29, 1981 (aged 81); San Francisco, California, U.S.
- Occupations: Chess player; author
- Spouse: Selma Kulik

Irving Chernev (January 29, 1900 – September 29, 1981) was an American chess player and prolific chess author.

He was born in Priluki, part of Poltava Governorate within the Russian Empire (present-day Ukraine). He emigrated to the United States in 1905. Chernev was a national master-strength player and was devoted to chess. He wrote that he "probably read more about chess, and played more games than any man in history."

Chernev's deep love for the game is obvious to any reader of his books. Chess historian Edward Winter commented:

Although Chess Notes items have shown that he sometimes cut corners, he was active at a time when writing and scholarship were not regarded as a natural pairing and when anecdotes and other chestnuts were particularly prevalent. Few were interested in sources. Above all, in the pre-digital age the work of writers in his field was far harder; they could not fill in gaps in their knowledge with press-of-a-button 'research'. …

Chernev's output — clear, humorous and easy-going — gave the impression of effortlessness, but much industry lay behind it all. …

Although his prose was often conversational, it was literate and carefully structured, bearing no resemblance to the ultra-casual 'I'm-just-one-of-the-lads' stuff increasingly seen in chess books and magazines since his time. We have also been struck by the scarcity of typographical errors in Chernev's writing throughout his life.

He wrote 20 chess books, among them: Chessboard Magic!, The Bright Side of Chess, The Fireside Book of Chess (with Fred Reinfeld), The Most Instructive Games of Chess Ever Played, 1000 Best Short Games of Chess, Practical Chess Endings, Combinations: The Heart of Chess, and Capablanca's Best Chess Endings, the last of these being highly regarded by Edward Winter:

Published by the Oxford University Press in 1978 and reprinted by Dover in 1982, Capablanca's Best Chess Endings by Irving Chernev presents (in full algebraic notation) sixty complete games, annotated with emphasis on the final phase. Well over half are absent from the Golombek volume, a fact which underscores not only the inadequacy of Golombek's selection but also Chernev's readiness to embrace newly-found material. Written with deceptive casualness, Capablanca's Best Chess Endings was, perhaps, Chernev's finest book, combining hard analytical work and his customary screwball levity. Only Chernev could write annotations like (page 169) '“Don't simplify against Capablanca!”, I keep telling them at the office'.

In 1945, he and Kenneth Harkness wrote An Invitation to Chess, which became one of the most successful chess books ever written, with sales reaching six figures. Perhaps his best-known book is Logical Chess: Move by Move, first released in 1957. This takes 33 classic games from 1889 to 1952, played by masters such as Capablanca, Alekhine, and Tarrasch, and explains them in an instructive manner. An algebraic notation version was published by Batsford in 1998, with minor alterations to the original text. Similar editions followed for Winning Chess and The Most Instructive Games of Chess Ever Played. Chernev was married to Selma Kulik, and they had a son, Melvin Chernev. He died in San Francisco in 1981.

== Books ==
- Chess Strategy and Tactics (with Fred Reinfeld); Black Knight 1933
- Curious Chess Facts; Black Knight 1937
- Chessboard Magic!; Chess Review 1943
- An Invitation to Chess (with Kenneth Harkness); Simon & Schuster 1945
- Winning Chess Traps; Chess Review 1946
- The Russians Play Chess; McKay 1947
- The Bright Side of Chess; McKay 1948
- Winning Chess (with Fred Reinfeld); Simon & Schuster 1948
- The Fireside Book of Chess (with Fred Reinfeld); Simon & Schuster 1949
- 1000 Best Short Games of Chess; Simon & Schuster 1955
- Logical Chess: Move by Move; Simon & Schuster 1957
- Combinations: The Heart of Chess; Crowell 1960
- Practical Chess Endings; Simon & Schuster 1961
- The Most Instructive Games of Chess Ever Played; Simon & Schuster 1965
- The Chess Companion; Simon & Schuster 1968
- Chess in an Hour (with Frank J. Marshall); Sentinel 1968
- Wonders and Curiosities of Chess; Dover 1974
- The Golden Dozen (later renamed Twelve Great Chess Players and Their Best Games); Oxford 1976
- Capablanca's Best Chess Endings; Oxford 1978
- The Compleat Draughts Player; Oxford 1981
- 200 Brilliant Endgames; Simon & Schuster 1989
