= Burt Hochberg =

American chess player

Burt Hochberg (1933 – May 13, 2006) was an expert on chess and other games and puzzles. He authored and edited many books on chess, and served as editor of both Chess Life (from December 1966 until October 1979 inclusive), and GAMES magazine. Hochberg has been the longest-serving editor in the history of Chess Life magazine.

Hochberg was the main publishing and advisory force behind the RHM Publishing chess project in the 1970s, which produced many high-quality titles from several of the world's top players, which sold well. This work caught and fed the enormous increase in chess popularity spurred by Bobby Fischer's conquest of the World Chess Championship in 1972. Examples are:

- The French Defence, by Svetozar Gligorić (RHM Publishing 1974);
- The Benko Gambit, by Pal Benko, (RHM Publishing 1973);
- World Championship Interzonals: Leningrad—Petropolis 1973, by Robert Wade, L.S. Blackstock, and Alexander Kotov, (RHM Publishing 1974);
- How To Open A Chess Game, by seven International Grandmasters (Larry Evans, Paul Keres, Tigran Petrosian, Lajos Portisch, Vlastimil Hort, Svetozar Gligorić, and Bent Larsen), (RHM Publishing 1974).
