= Ed Edmondson (chess official) =

American chess player and official (1920–1982)

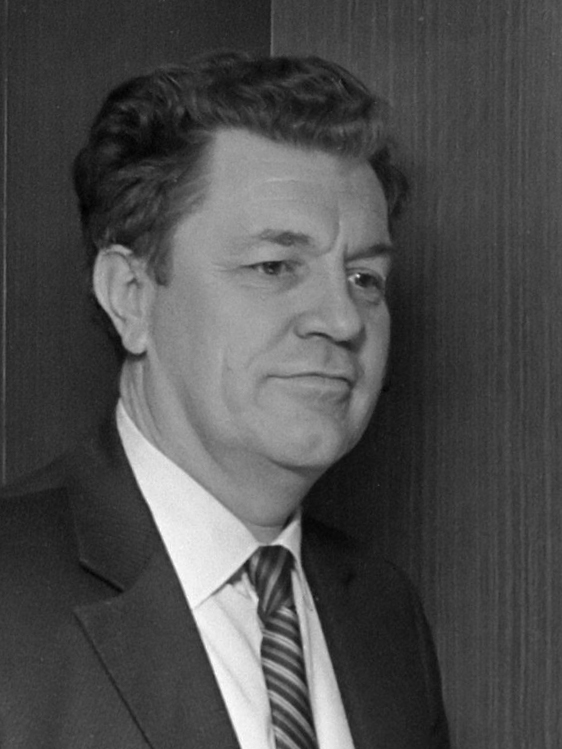
- Ed Edmondson (1972)

President of the United States Chess Federation
- In office 1963–1966

Personal details
- Born: August 13, 1920 Rochester, New York
- Died: October 21, 1982 (aged 62) Honolulu, Hawaii

Edmund Edmondson (13 August 1920 – 21 October 1982) was president of the United States Chess Federation from 1963 to 1966 and executive director of the United States Chess Federation from 1966 to 1975. He served as an officer in the United States Air Force, reaching the rank of lieutenant colonel.

Edmondson played a key role in Bobby Fischer's path to the World Chess Championship in 1972. He asked Pal Benko, who had qualified for the 1970 Interzonal, to yield his spot to Fischer. Benko realized that Fischer had a much greater chance of winning and agreed, working instead as a second for the other US players. Edmondson is also credited with greatly expanding the USCF. Edmondson served as Fischer's manager during the 1970 Interzonal, and during his winning 1971 Candidates Tournament matches against Mark Taimanov, Bent Larsen, and Tigran Petrosian.

Edmundson was born in Rochester, New York, and died in Honolulu.
