= United States Chess Federation =

US governing body for chess competition

- Abbreviation: US Chess or USCF (Note: In 2015 the U.S. Chess Federation announced a rebranding effort, calling itself US Chess rather than USCF (Chess Life, August 2015, p. 13). Wikipedia continues to use the older abbreviation USCF because it is more commonly used in secondary sources.)
- Formation: December 27, 1939
- Merger of: American Chess Federation (ACF); National Chess Federation (NCF)
- Headquarters: 333 S 18th St. Suite 210; St. Louis, Missouri
- Region served: United States
- Members: 112,000+ (2022)
- President: John Fernandez (Missouri)
- Vice President: John D. Rockefeller V (Maryland)
- Executive Director: Fred Abousleman
- Affiliations: FIDE
- Staff: 22
- Website: uschess.org

The United States Chess Federation (also known as US Chess or USCF) is the governing body for chess competition in the United States and represents the U.S. in the World Chess Federation (FIDE). USCF administers the official national rating system, awards national titles, sanctions over twenty national championships annually, and publishes two magazines: Chess Life and Chess Life Kids. The USCF was founded and incorporated in Illinois in 1939, from the merger of two older chess organizations. It is a 501(c)(3) non-profit organization headquartered in St. Louis, Missouri. Its membership as of 2024 was 112,000.

== History ==
In 1939, the United States of America Chess Federation was created in Illinois through the merger of the American Chess Federation and National Chess Federation. The American Chess Federation, formerly the Western Chess Association, held an annual open championship since 1900; that tournament, after the merger, became the U.S. Open. The National Chess Federation, founded in 1927 to organize U.S. participation in the Olympiads, had held the prestigious invitational U.S. Championship since 1936.

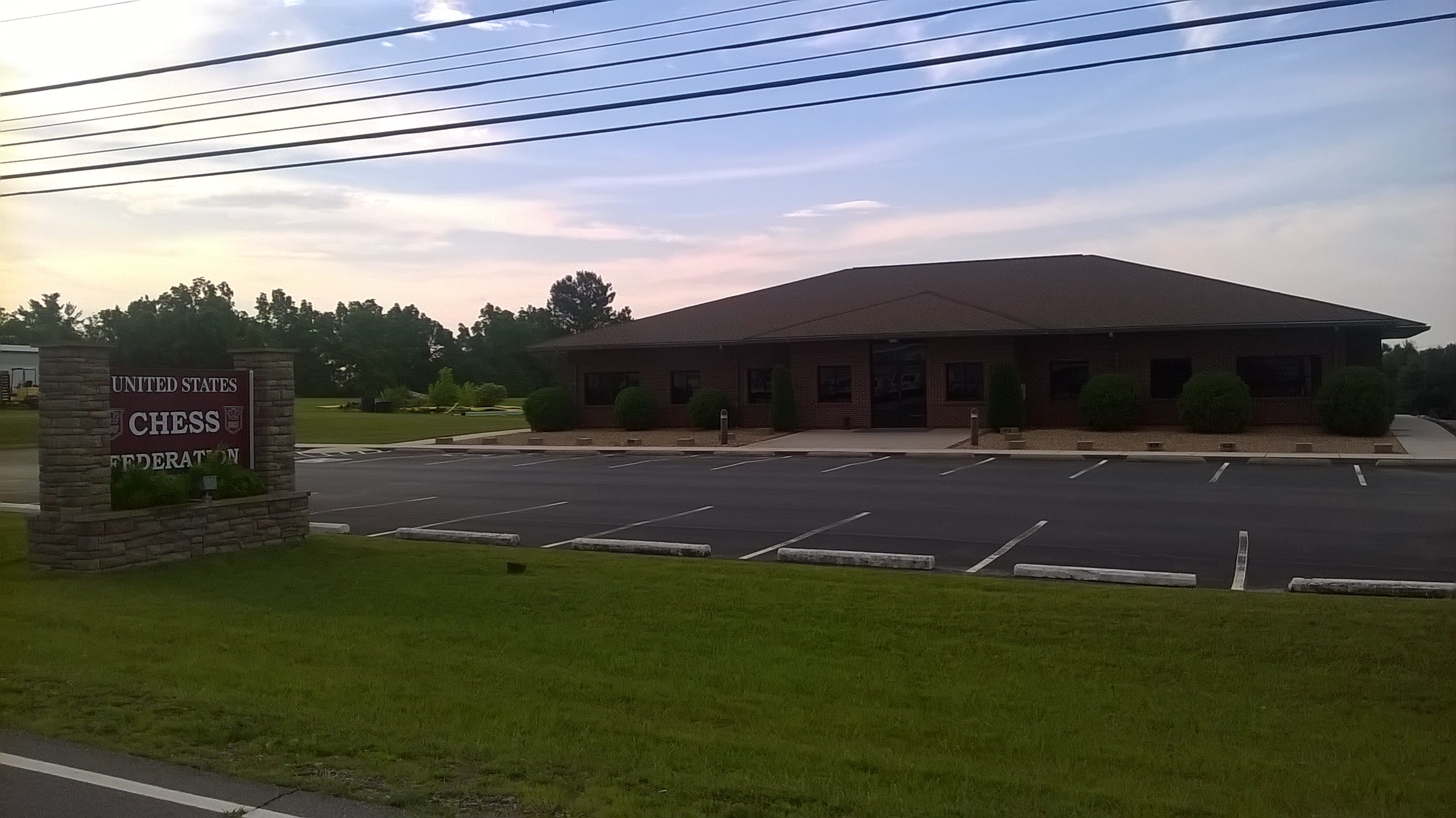
Former headquarters in Crossville

The combined membership at the time was around 1,000. Membership experienced consistent, modest growth until 1958, when Bobby Fischer won the U.S. Championship at the age of 14. This began the "Fischer era", during which USCF membership grew thirty-fold, to approximately 60,000 in 1974, after Fischer had won the World Chess Championship.

The Fischer era did not last long, but the USCF has grown substantially since then, largely because of the explosive growth of scholastic chess. Annual national championship tournaments are now held at different grade and age levels; none of these tournaments, which now attract thousands of players, even existed prior to 1969.

At its founding, the USCF had no employees and no headquarters, but in 1952, it hired a Business Manager (the position eventually became Executive Director), headquartered in New York. In 1967, headquarters moved to Newburgh, New York; in 1976, New Windsor, New York; in 2006, Crossville, Tennessee; and in 2022, St. Louis, Missouri.

== Governance ==
The U.S. Chess Federation has, in effect, two governing bodies. The Board of Delegates, composed of 140 persons designated by the state affiliates, as well as some other categories, meets annually at the U.S. Open. The Executive Board, composed of eight persons elected by the membership to staggered four-year terms, meets monthly.

== Ratings ==
US Chess rating classes
Category	Rating range
Senior Master	2400 and up
National Master	2200–2399
Expert	2000–2199
Class A	1800–1999
Class B	1600–1799
Class C	1400–1599
Class D	1200–1399
Class E	1000–1199
Class F	800–999
Class G	600–799
Class H	400–599
Class I	200–399
Class J	100–199

US Chess implements rating systems for chess players. In each system, a rating is a calculated numerical estimate of a player's strength, based on results in tournament play against other rated players. Tournament organizers submit results to US Chess, which carries out the calculations and publishes the results.

A player can have up to seven ratings: for correspondence games, for over-the-board games at regular (slow), quick, or blitz time controls, and for online games regular, quick, or blitz time controls. Ratings are posted online on the US Chess Player Search web page. Ratings for over-the-board play range from 100 to nearly 3000, with a higher rating indicating a stronger player. Ratings are often used by tournament organizers to determine eligibility for "class" prizes, and eligibility to enter "class" sections, in tournaments.

USCF first instituted a rating system for over-the-board play in 1950, using a calculation formula devised by Kenneth Harkness. In 1960, the USCF adopted a more reliable rating system invented by Arpad Elo, a college professor of physics who was a chess master. Elo worked with USCF for many years. The system he invented, or a variant of it, was later adopted by FIDE, and is utilized in other games and sports, including USA Today's college football and basketball rankings. USCF has made further adjustments to the rating calculation over the years; the present calculation was influenced by the "Glicko rating system" developed by Prof. Mark Glickman, a significant refinement of Elo's system.

== Titles ==
US Chess norms-based titles
Title	Rating Level
Life Senior Master	2400
Life Master	2200
Candidate Master	2000
1st Category	1800
2nd Category	1600
3rd Category	1400
4th Category	1200

US Chess awards titles for lifetime achievement. These should not be confused with the titles awarded by FIDE, such as Grandmaster and International Master.

US Chess awards a player who achieves a rating of 2200 or above the title of National Master and sends the player a certificate. Likewise, a Senior Master certificate is awarded for a rating of 2400 or higher. Until 2008, the only other title awarded was that of Life Master, awarded to players who played 300 or more rated games while maintaining a rating above 2200.

In 2008, the USCF implemented a system of "norms-based titles", patterned after the titles awarded by FIDE: if a person has (for example) five tournaments in which they demonstrate strength above 2400, and if in addition their rating at some time eventually reaches 2400, then they earn the Life Senior Master title. The system is somewhat more complicated than this simple example suggests. The old Life Master title was renamed Original Life Master to avoid confusion with the new Life Master title; both are recognized by US Chess.

== National championships ==
US Chess organizes or sanctions various national championships. Most of these are held annually.

The oldest is the U.S. Open. It began as the Western Open in 1900, held in Minnesota. It is the "congress" of US Chess – the annual meeting of the Delegates is held concurrently, as well as many smaller gatherings and events. Several hundred players participate (the highest number, 836, was at the 1983 event in Pasadena).

Several invitational events are held concurrently with the US Open. Each US Chess state affiliate nominates a representative to each of the invitationals. The five invitationals are: The John T. Irwin National Senior Tournament of Champions (50+), The GM Arnold Denker National Tournament of High School State Champions (9-12th Grade), The Dewain Barber National Tournament of Middle School State Champions (6-8th Grade), The John D. Rockefeller National Tournament of Elementary School State Champions (K-5th Grade), and The Ruth Haring National Tournament of Girls State Champions (K-12). The FM Sunil Weeramantry National Blitz Tournament of State Champions is a blitz tournament open to those participating in the other invitationals. Players generally qualify for these events by winning a state championship tournament, although each state affiliate is allowed to use any criteria for selecting its representatives.

The U.S. Championship, an invitational event, has been held since 1936. (For many years before that, the national championship had been decided by head-to-head match play.) Noteworthy past winners include Samuel Reshevsky, Bobby Fischer, Walter Browne, Larry Evans, Gata Kamsky, and Hikaru Nakamura. The current (2026) champion is Wesley So.

The U.S. Women's Championship, also invitational, has been held since 1937. In recent years it has been held concurrently with the U.S. Championship. The current (2026) women's champion is Rachael Li.

The largest national championships are the Elementary (K-5), Middle School (K-8), and High School (K-12) Championships which are held annually in the spring. Every four years, the events are combined into "SuperNationals." The SuperNationals in 2017 drew 5,575 players to Nashville, Tennessee, and was the largest rated chess tournament ever. The oldest of the three, the National High School, was first held in 1969 by the Continental Chess Association.

The Elementary, Junior High, and High School championships should not be confused with the National K-12 Grades Championships, held in December, in which each grade level from K to 12 has its own championship.

Except for the U.S. Championship and U.S. Women's Championship, the tournaments listed above are organized by US Chess itself. The US Chess calendar of national events also includes several events which are bid out, including:

National Open	open
U.S. Junior Championship	invitational; under age 21
U.S. Junior Open	under age 21
U.S. Junior Congress	under age 21
U.S. Cadet	invitational; under age 16
U.S. Senior Open	open; age 50 or over
U.S. Senior Championship	invitational; age 50 or over
Pan-American Intercollegiate	college teams
President's Cup	top 4 from Pan-Ams; college teams
National Collegiate Rapid & Blitz Championships	college players
U.S. Masters	open; rating 2200 or over plus qualified juniors
U.S. Class Championships	open
U.S. Amateur (North, South, East, West)	rating under 2200
U.S. Amateur Team (North, South, East, West)	teams rated under 2200
All-Girls National	K-12 girls
U.S. Women's Open	women
U.S. Junior Girls	invitational; under age 21
U.S. Senior Women's Championship	invitational; age 50 or over
U.S. Blind Championship	legally blind players
U.S. G/5; G/10; G/5; G/30; G/60 Championships	open

US Chess also organizes national correspondence chess championships:

Absolute Correspondence Chess Championship	invitational
Golden Knights	open; mail or e-mail
Electronic Knights	open; e-mail only

== Publications ==
US Chess publishes two magazines, the monthly Chess Life, and bi-monthly Chess Life for Kids, which is geared towards those under 14. Chess Life, which began in 1946 as a bi-weekly newspaper, is now a glossy full-color magazine of 72 pages per issue.

US Chess also publishes a rulebook. The current 7th edition is self-published by US Chess and produced in paperback and kindle forms. The most relevant chapters for over-the-board play are also available to download for free online from the US Chess website.

== Controversies ==
=== Jennifer Shahade Lawsuit ===
Shahade filed a lawsuit in July 2024 against U.S. Chess and its president Randy Bauer and chess writer Peter Tamburro, citing defamation, employer retaliation, sex discrimination and violations of the Racketeer Influenced and Corrupt Organizations Act. Shahade alleged that she was discharged from U.S. Chess after tweeting in February 2023 that Alejandro Ramirez had sexually assaulted her on two occasions and that U.S. Chess did not act on her 2011 and 2014 reports on Ramirez. In the weeks that followed after Shahade's tweet, eight more women alleged that Ramirez had also sexually assaulted them. Shahade also alleged the organization was involved in conducting a smear campaign to discredit her. The lawsuit was resolved in March 2026.

== See also ==
- Executive Directors of the United States Chess Federation
- Fédération Internationale des Échecs (FIDE)
- International Correspondence Chess Federation (ICCF)
- Presidents of the United States Chess Federation
- Scholastic chess in the United States
