= Chess tournament =

Series of competitive chess games

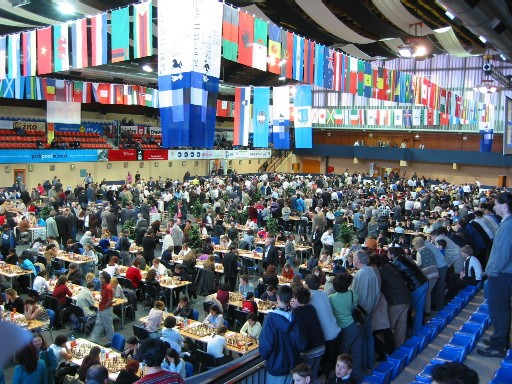
The 35th Chess Olympiad, a chess tournament for teams

A chess tournament is a series of chess games played competitively to determine a winning individual or team. Since the first international chess tournament in London, 1851, chess tournaments have become the standard form of chess competition among multiple serious players.

Today, the most recognized chess tournaments for individual competition include the Candidates Tournament and the Tata Steel Chess Tournament. The largest team chess tournament is the Chess Olympiad, in which players compete for their country's team in the same fashion as the Olympic Games. Since the 1960s, chess computers have occasionally entered human tournaments, but this is no longer common, because computers would defeat humans and win the tournament.

Most chess tournaments are organized and directed according to the World Chess Federation (FIDE) handbook, which offers guidelines and regulations for conducting tournaments. Chess tournaments are mainly held in either round-robin style, Swiss-system style or elimination style to determine a winning party.

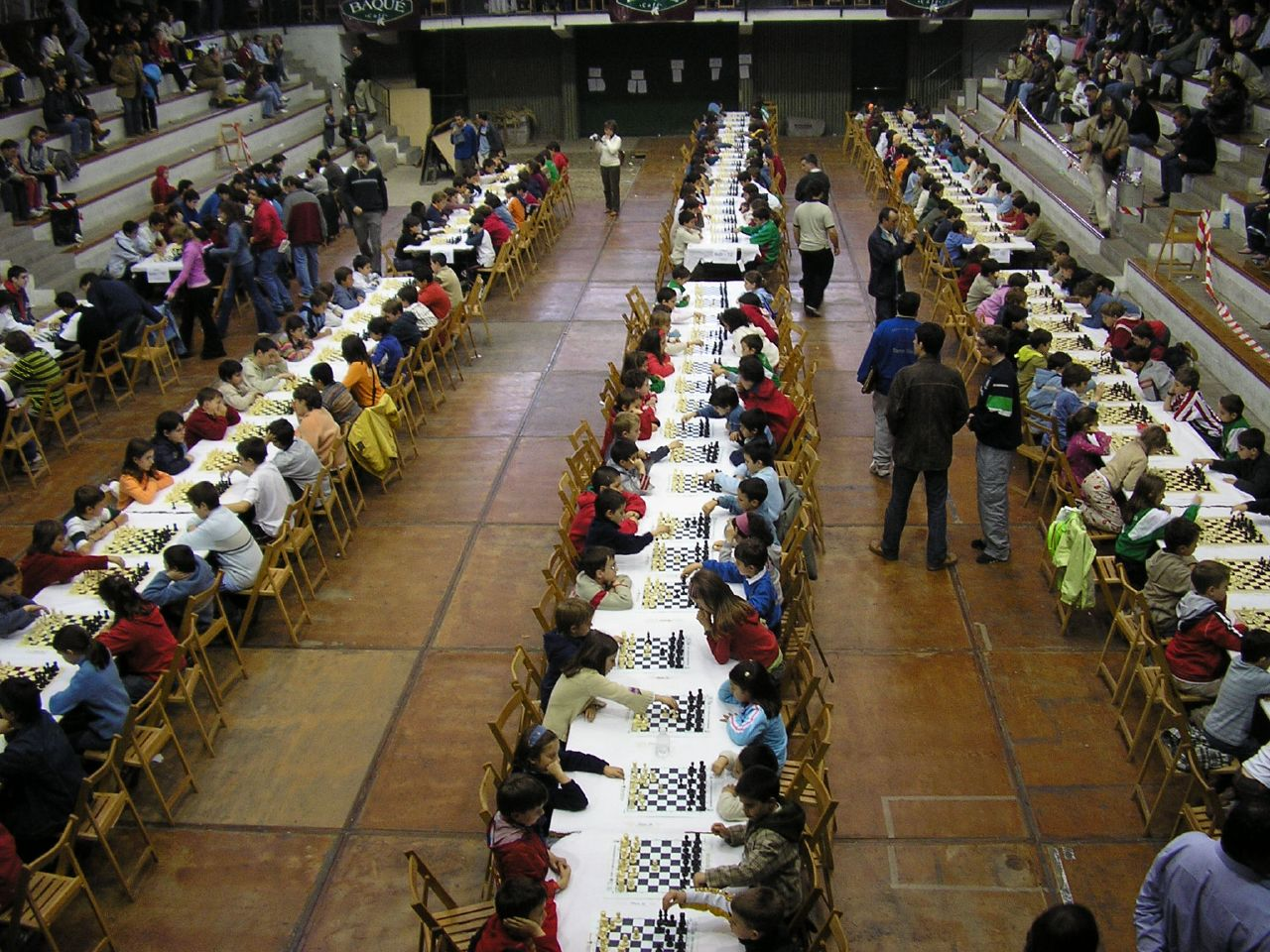
A large youth chess tournament in Spain

== History ==
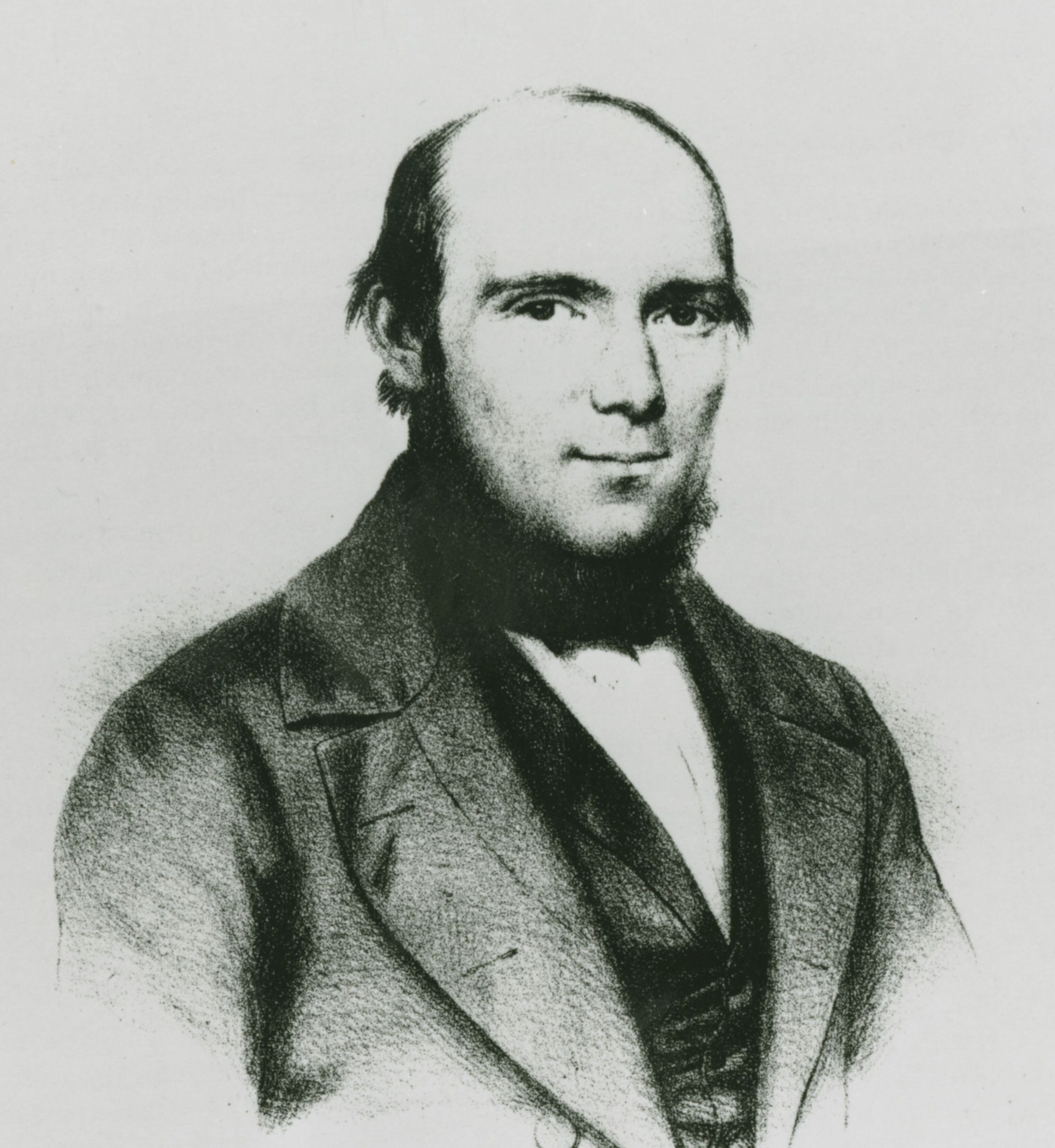
Adolf Anderssen

Although modern chess had been established since around 1475, the first tournament (in the sense of structured competitions) was in Leeds in 1841. There was a knockout tournament in London in 1849 and a tournament in Amsterdam in 1851. The first international chess tournament was held in London in 1851. The London 1851 tournament took place during the Great Exhibition, and would serve as a guide for future international chess tournaments that would follow it. The tournament not only showed the need for time controls but it also clearly demonstrated the drawbacks to the knockout elimination tournament format. It was won by Adolf Anderssen of Germany, who became regarded as the world's best chess player as a result.

The number of international chess tournaments increased rapidly afterwards. By the end of the 1850s, chess tournaments had been held in Berlin, Paris, Manchester, New York City, San Francisco, Birmingham, and Vienna. By the end of World War II there were 24 international chess tournaments per year, and by 1990 there were well over a thousand.

=== Chess Olympiads ===
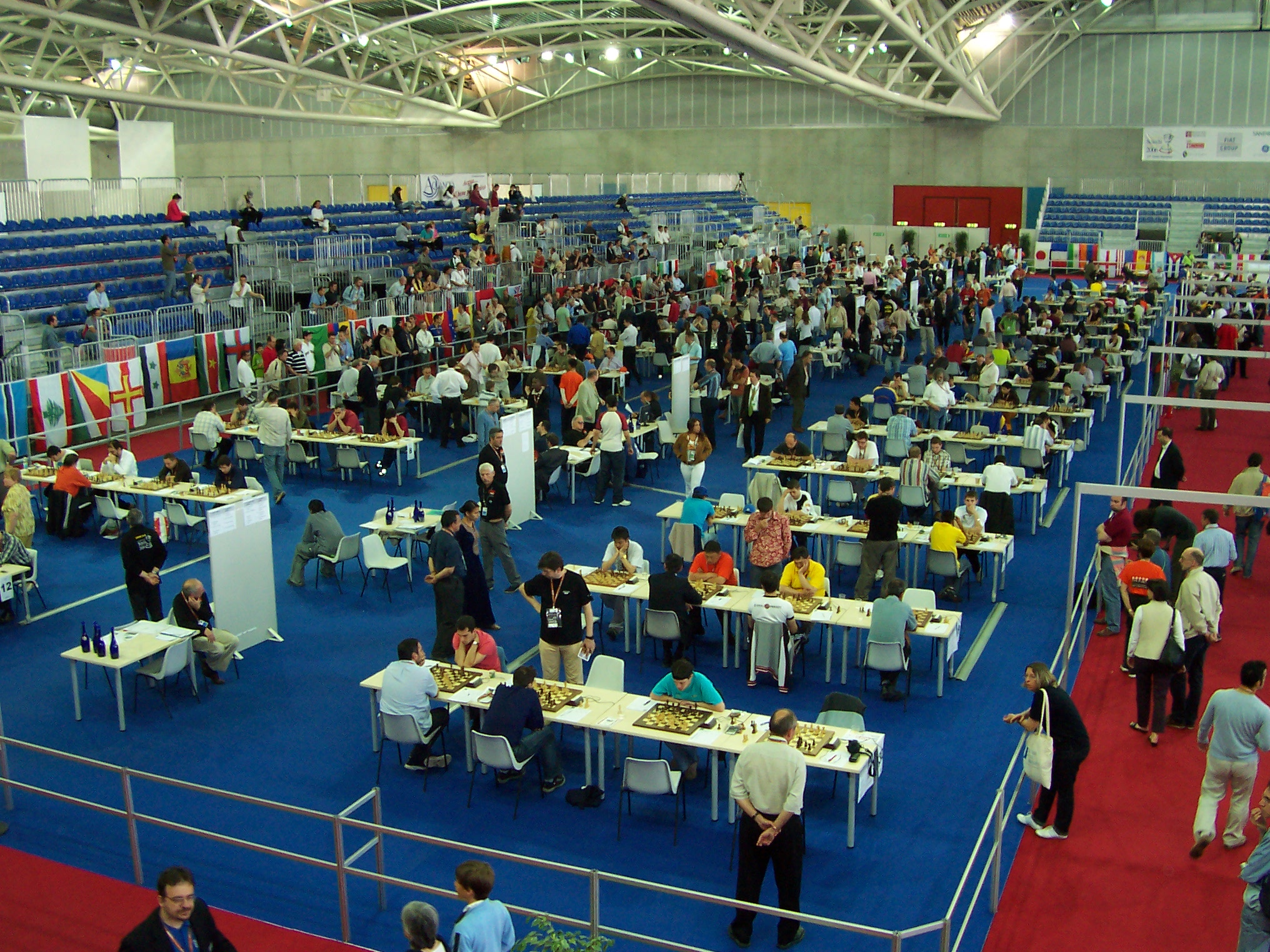
Chess Olympiad tournament hall, Torino 2006

An attempt was made in 1924 to include chess in the Olympic Games. However, because it was very difficult to distinguish between amateur and professional chess players, the event was called off. While the 1924 Summer Olympics was taking place in Paris, the 1st unofficial Chess Olympiad took place separately from the Olympics, but also in Paris. The Fédération Internationale des Échecs (FIDE) was formed on the closing day of the first unofficial Chess Olympiad. FIDE organized the first official Chess Olympiad in 1927 in which there were 16 participating countries. By the 29th Chess Olympiad in 1990, there were 127 member countries. The Chess Olympiads were held at irregular intervals by FIDE until 1950; since then, they have been held regularly every two years.

Growth of Chess Olympiads

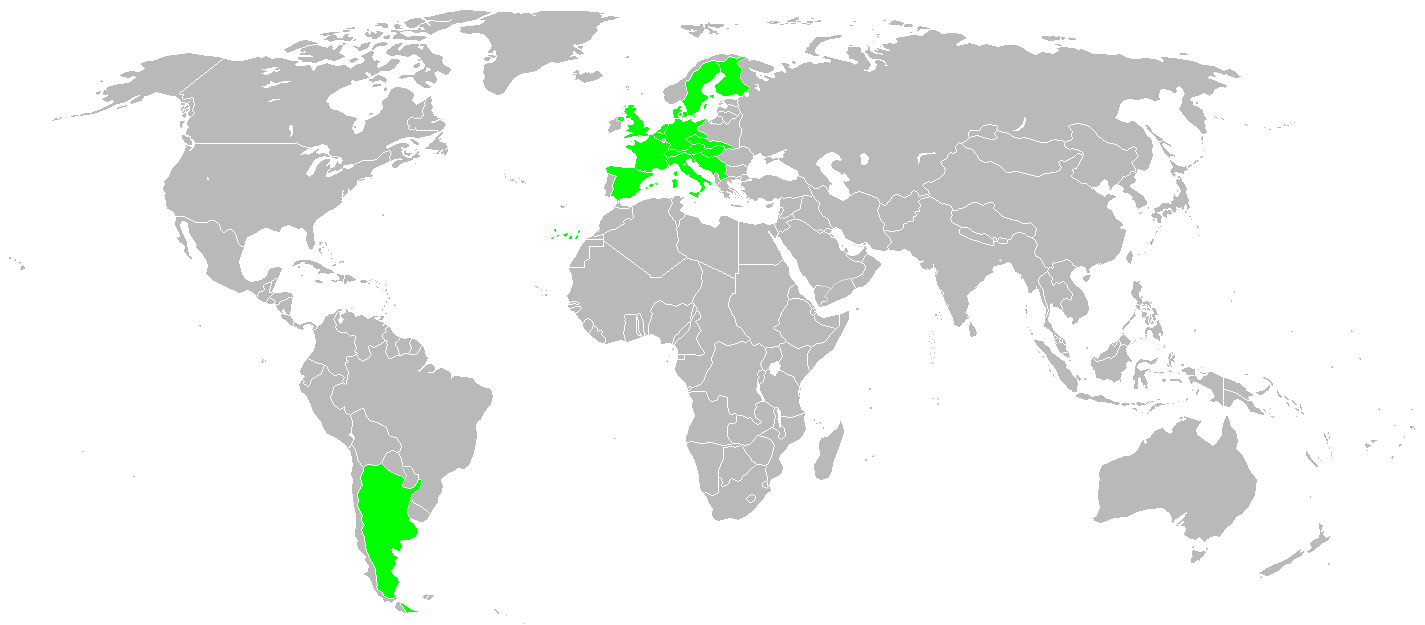
There were 16 participating nations in the 1st Chess Olympiad, 1927.

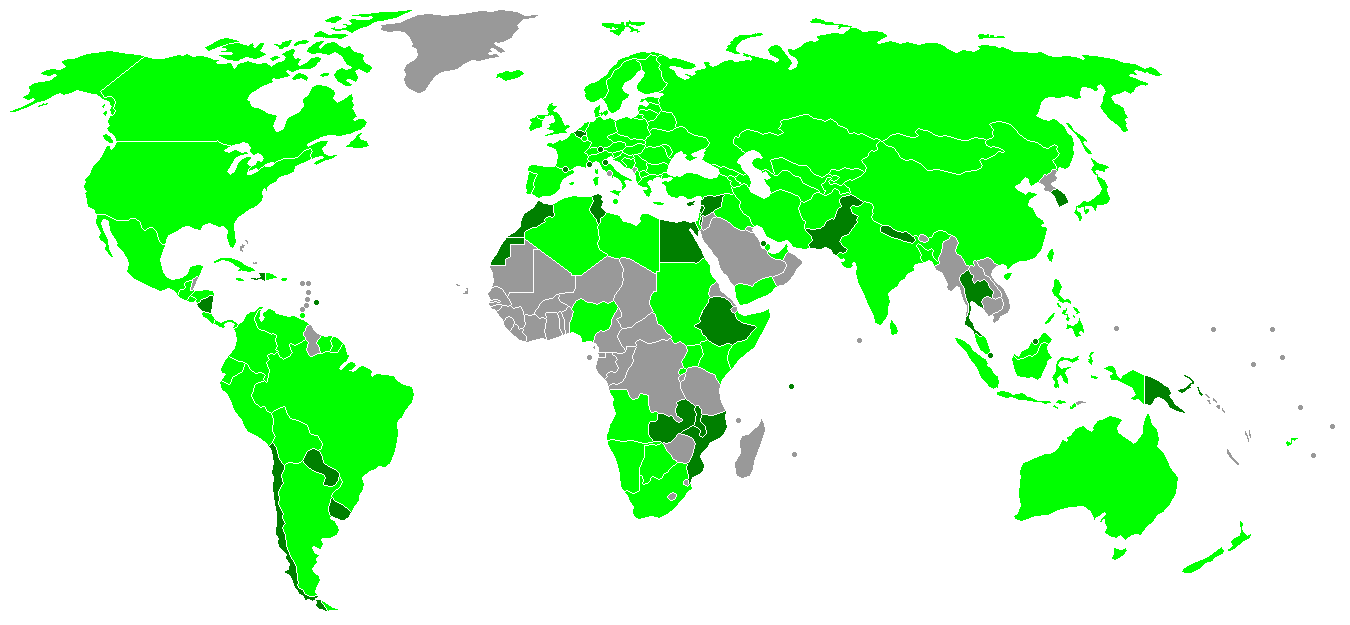
By the 37th Chess Olympiad, 2006, there were 133 participating nations.

=== Computers in chess tournaments ===
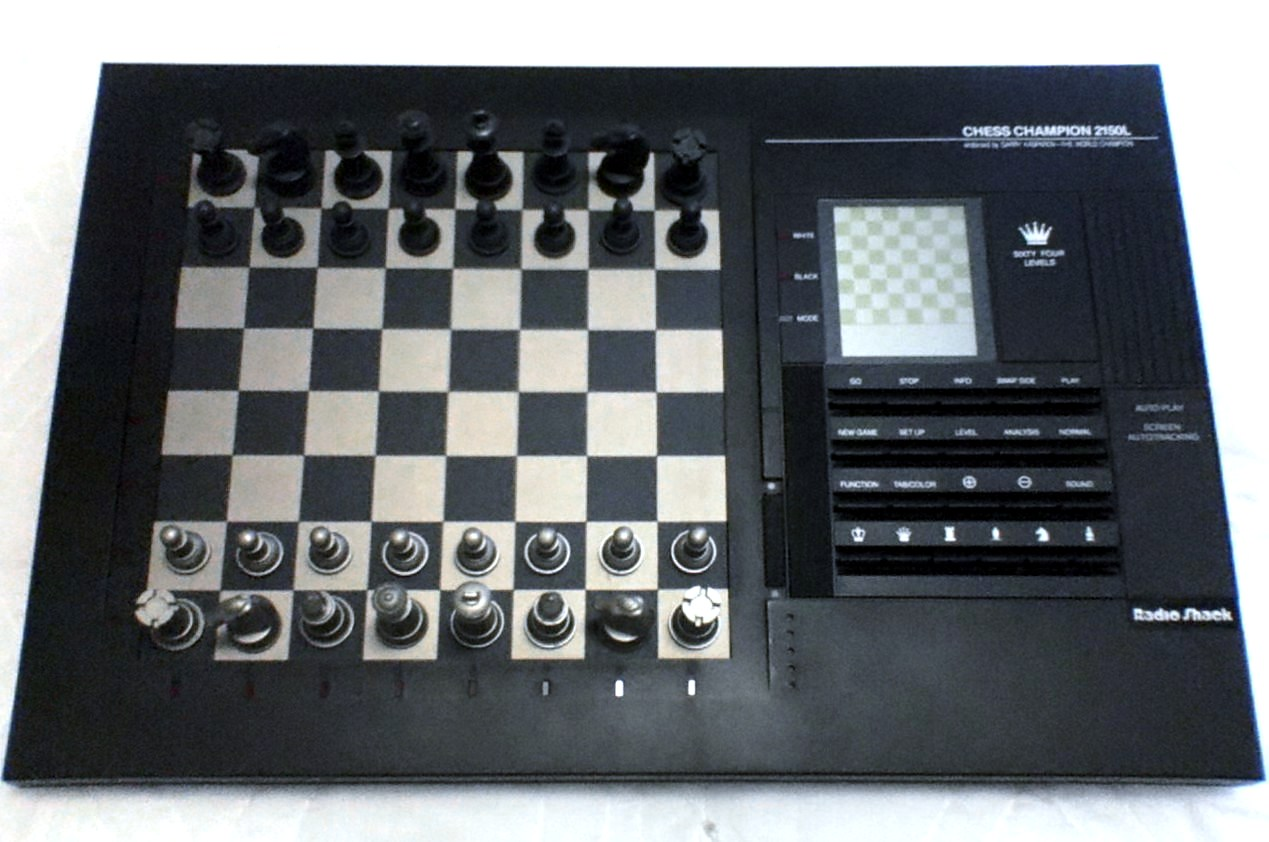
A pressure-sensory chess computer with an LCD screen from the 1990s

The first chess engine (a chess playing computer program) to beat a person in tournament play was the Mac Hack Six, in 1967. Soon after, tournaments were created just for chess computers. In 1970, the first North American Computer Chess Championship (NACCC) was held in New York City, and in 1974, the first World Computer Chess Championship (WCCC) was held in Stockholm. Kaissa, a chess program of the Soviet Union was named the world's first computer chess champion. In 1995, the first World Computer Speed Chess Championship was held in Paderborn, Germany for blitz chess. For a time, computers competed in human tournaments as well, but computers have become so strong that humans are no longer able to compete with them; players now tend to treat them as analysis tools rather than as opponents. Interest remains in computer chess tournaments, especially the World Computer Chess Championship and Top Chess Engine Championship.

== Rules ==
FIDE publishes a handbook giving rules for chess tournaments. This includes sections giving the rules of the game, but there are also sections specifying how tournaments are organized and regulated.

=== The chess clock ===
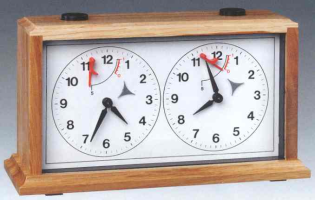
A typical analog chess clock. Note the two separate timers.

A chess clock is a clock with two separate time displays of which only one display can be running at a time. The player with the black pieces will initiate their opponent's timer at the start of the game. Thus the player with the white pieces will have their timer running first, and will make the first move. The player or the arbiter may end the game at any time after the player's opponent has overstepped their time limit. If a timed-out clock remains unnoticed, the game will continue as normal. If the game needs to be interrupted, the arbiter shall stop the clock.

Due to most tournaments having increment or delay as well as digital clocks being more precise, digital chess clocks are the preferred choice of equipment in tournaments.

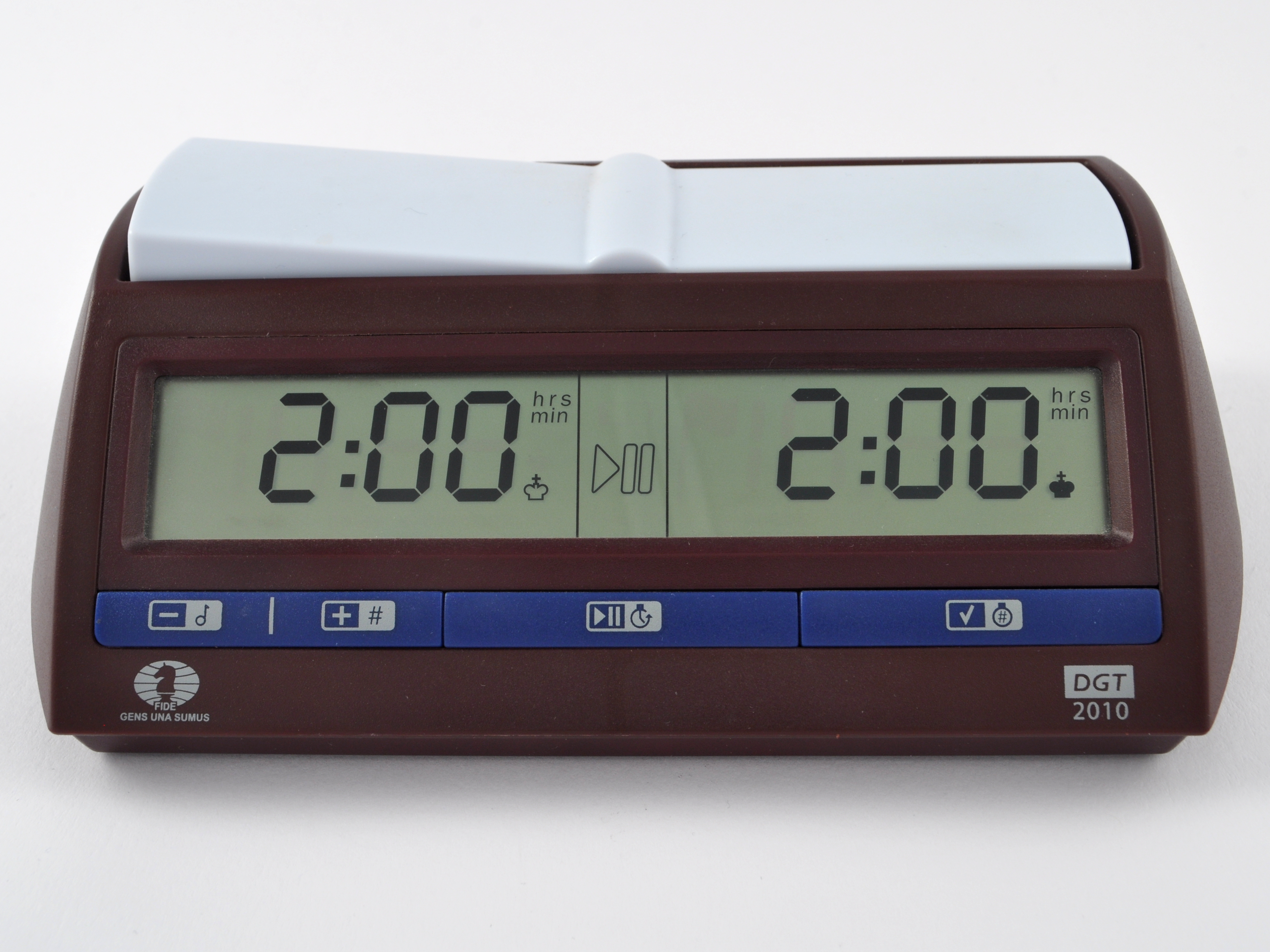
Digital clock

=== Irregularities ===
If it is found that the starting position of the pieces was incorrect, the game must be cancelled and restarted. If it is found that an illegal move has been made, the game must return to the position directly before the irregularity. For the first illegal move by a player, the arbiter shall give two minutes extra time to his opponent. If a player makes a second illegal move in the same game, the arbiter shall declare the game lost by the offending player. If a game begins with the piece colors reversed, the game should be stopped and restarted unless an arbiter rules otherwise. If a player displaces any pieces, they should place them in the correct locations on their own time.

=== The recording of moves ===
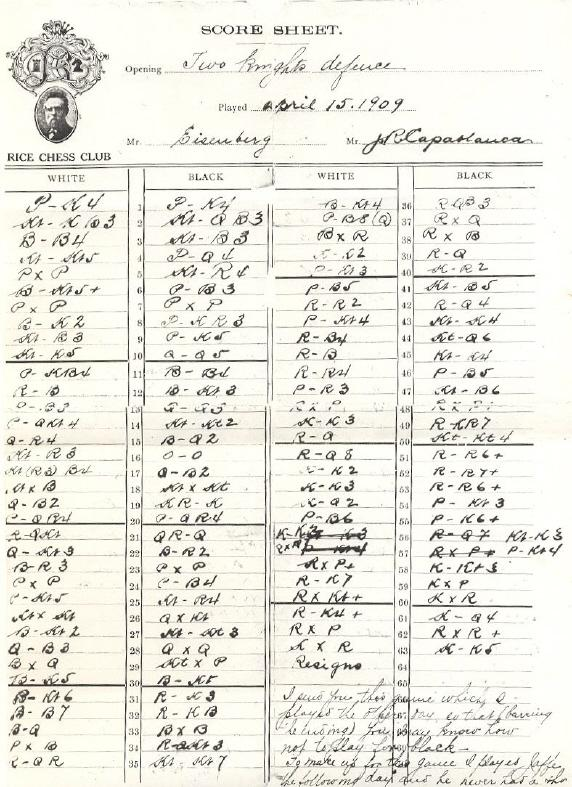
A chess score sheet of a 1909 match between José Raúl Capablanca and Louis Eisenberg, in descriptive notation

In games with long time controls, each player is required to record all moves of the game in algebraic chess notation. If, however, a player reaches less than five minutes on their clock, and does not have an increment of thirty seconds or more, they are excused from recording the remaining game moves until the game has been completed. At the conclusion of the game, both players must sign each other's score sheets and turn them in to the event organizer if instructed to do so. In fast chess games, players are not required to record moves, as it would take away important thinking time. The score sheets must be visible to the arbiter at all times.

=== The drawn game ===
A player must make their own move before offering a draw, and must not stop their own clock and start their opponent's clock before they have made the offer. If a player does not make a move before offering a draw, the opponent can request a move before considering the draw offer (which cannot be retracted). No conditions may be attached to a draw offer. If a player claims a draw according to the rules of chess, the player is allowed to stop both clocks and record the draw claim as long as their opponent agrees to the claim. If the opponent disputes the draw claim, the director may be called to come to a conclusion. If the claim is found to be correct, the game is drawn. Once a player has made a move from a position eligible for a draw, they lose their rights to claim a draw in that position.

=== Quickplay finish ===
The quickplay finish is the phase of the game when all remaining moves must be made in a limited time. If a player has two minutes or less left on their clock, they may ask the arbiter to adjudicate a draw. The arbiter must decide if the player's opponent is making any attempt to win the game by normal means, or if the position can be won in any way. If the arbiter decides against a draw, the player's opponent will be awarded two extra minutes of time. Otherwise, the game is drawn, and the decision of the arbiter is final.

=== Scoring ===
Symbol	Score
1–0	White wins
0–1	Black wins
½–½	drawn game

Players are granted one point (1) for a win, a half point (½) for a draw, and no points (0) for a loss toward their tournament score. A minority of tournaments use alternative scoring systems such as "football scoring" (3 points for a win, 1 point for a draw), but they are treated the same as regular scoring for the purposes of Elo rating. Full-point byes are received when a player is excluded from a round because of an extra player. Thus, in tournaments with an odd number of players, a different player will receive a full-point each round. A full-point bye is equal in points to a normal win. Half-point byes can be requested by a player who will be unavailable for a round. If accepted, the player will receive a half-point, as if they had drawn the game. A player who wins by forfeit or default will also be granted one point.

=== Player conduct ===
Players are not allowed to take any action that will bring the game into disrepute. For example, deliberate attempts at cheating by sneaking a captured piece back on to the board can be punished by this rule, rather than the rules dealing with illegal moves.

Players can not make any use of any outside information. This includes advice, notes, and analysis of another chess board. During play, a player is forbidden to have a mobile phone or any other electronic means of communication in the playing venue; failure to comply with this may result in a forfeit. Chess score sheets may be used for recording matters relevant to the game. Players should not distract or annoy their competitor in any way. Once a player has finished their game, they are considered a spectator. Refusal of a player to comply with the rules may result in penalty, up to and including forfeiture of the game or even disqualification of the player. If two opponents both refuse to obey the rules, the game may be considered lost by both players. In 1976, smoking was banned in a major tournament for the first time (the National Open, Las Vegas).

=== The role of the arbiter ===
The arbiter must see that the Laws of Chess are observed and make decisions in the best interest of the competition, but must not interfere with the game otherwise. If a rule is broken, the arbiter may choose from a number of penalties including the following:

- warning the offending player
- increasing the remaining time of the opponent
- reducing the remaining time of the offending player
- declaring a game to be lost
- reducing the points scored in a game by the offending player
- increasing the points scored in a game by the opponent
- expulsion of the offending player from the event.

The arbiter may also expel offending spectators from the venue. Spectators are also forbidden to use mobile phones at any time in the playing area, and may be expelled for it. Member federations are allowed to ask FIDE authorities to give an official decision about problems relating to the Laws of Chess.

== Formats ==
Most chess tournaments are held in either round-robin style, Swiss-system style or single-elimination style.

=== Round-robin ===
In round-robin tournaments, each participant plays every other participant an equal number of times. Round-robin tournaments involving four participants are known as "quads" or "foursome". Round-robin tournaments are often used for small groups because the element of luck is reduced when every player plays everyone else. Rating categories are sometimes used to separate players of different levels into different round-robin groups. The World Chess Federation, the Australian Chess Federation and the United States Chess Federation all use different categorization scales to distinguish player ability.

Most round robin tournaments use the traditional 1-½-0 scoring system. In recent years, however, a few tournaments, such as Bilbao and London, have experimented with the football 3-1-0 scoring system to encourage players to go for wins.

=== Swiss system ===
A tournament that has too many participants for a round-robin format is commonly conducted as a Swiss-system tournament. This is the most common format for amateur events, and is also common at professional level. In the Swiss style, players are paired as far as possible with opponents having same or similar scores. Pairing players for Swiss-system tournaments is often quite complicated due to some nontrivial constraints:

- Players do not face the same opponent more than once.
- As far as possible, color allocation is equalized, and in the end, the number of White and Black games should differ by no more than one.
- In some tournaments, pairings between players from the same federation are avoided in the final round to avoid match fixing.
- In some tournaments, pairings between players from particular countries are avoided for political reasons.

Swiss tournament pairings were traditionally done by hand using cards. Today, tournament organizers usually use software.

Due to the high percentage of draws and the small granularity of the scoring system which is entirely based on final results, it is common for players to have the same score as the tournament finishes. Although it is often not an issue, as the tied players often split prizes equally, in case of necessity (for trophies, qualifications to other tournaments, etc.), there are a few ways to achieve tiebreak. In no particular order:

- Sonneborn–Berger score
- Rating performance
- Number of wins, number of Black wins, etc.
- Tiebreak games, often involving the players playing a series of games with increasingly faster time controls until one player scores higher points (explained in more details in Elimination section)

Tournament organizers specify the tie-breaking rules (if any) on the entry form.

=== Elimination ===
A 16-player single-elimination tournament bracket

Single-elimination style or knock-out style are also sometimes used for chess tournaments. In fact, the first international chess tournament was held in single-elimination style. In single-elimination tournaments, the loser of a game is immediately eliminated from winning the first prize. In most single-elimination chess tournaments there is a chance for players to compete for positions other than first. Players are normally given seeds based on their rating in order to prevent the highest ranked players from facing each other early in the competition. Double-elimination tournaments work in the same way as single-elimination tournaments except that a player loses eligibility to take first prize after two losses.

Since chess is believed to have a first move advantage for white, to ensure fairness, the players have to face each other in an equal number of white and black games. For example, in the Chess World Cup, players face off each other in two games, except the final with four games. Resolving ties is absolutely crucial in this format, with the modern rule generally following:

1. The players play a number of rapid games (2 or 4) until ties are broken.

2. If the players are tied, they keep playing pairs of blitz games until ties are broken, or until a set number of pairs are played (usually 1 or 2 pairs, although it can be up to 5 pairs).

3. If the players are still tied, a single deciding game (Armageddon) will be used, with Black receiving draw odds (draw count as a win) in exchange for White having time advantage (typically 5 vs 4 minutes).

=== Scheveningen system ===
The Scheveningen system, first used in Scheveningen, Netherlands in 1923, involves two teams, each member of one team playing against each member of the other team. Typically each team has between 6 and 12 players, and both individual and team prizes may be awarded.

== Reporting results ==
Results are reported using a crosstable. A crosstable is an arrangement of the results of every game in a tournament in the form of a table. The result of each individual game is recorded in the appropriate cell.

=== Round-robin tournaments ===
Rows contain the player's name and a number indicating their finishing position; individual games can be looked up using these numbers as co-ordinates. Wins are indicated by 1, draws by ½ and losses by 0. For example, the following cross table shows the result of the Hastings 1895 chess tournament:

Hastings 1895
#	Player	1	2	3	4	5	6	7	8	9	10	11	12	13	14	15	16	17	18	19	20	21	22	Total
1	Harry Pillsbury (United States)	X	0	0	1	1	1	1	1	0	½	½	1	1	1	1	1	1	½	1	1	1	1	16½
2	Mikhail Chigorin (Russian Empire)	1	X	1	1	0	0	1	1	1	1	½	0	1	1	1	½	½	1	1	½	1	1	16
3	Emanuel Lasker (German Empire)	1	0	X	0	1	1	0	1	1	0	1	1	½	1	1	1	½	1	1	½	1	1	15½
4	Siegbert Tarrasch (German Empire)	0	0	1	X	1	1	½	0	½	1	1	1	0	1	½	1	1	1	0	½	1	1	14
5	William Steinitz (United States)	0	1	0	0	X	1	1	½	½	1	1	0	1	½	1	0	1	1	0	½	1	1	13
6	Emanuel Schiffers (Russian Empire)	0	1	0	0	0	X	½	½	0	1	1	1	½	½	1	1	0	½	1	½	1	1	12
7	Curt von Bardeleben (German Empire)	0	0	1	½	0	½	X	½	½	0	0	½	1	1	1	½	½	1	1	1	0	1	11½
8	Richard Teichmann (German Empire)	0	0	0	1	½	½	½	X	½	0	0	½	1	1	0	1	½	1	½	1	1	1	11½
9	Carl Schlechter (Austria)	1	0	0	½	½	1	½	½	X	½	½	0	1	1	½	½	½	½	½	½	1	0	11
10	Joseph Henry Blackburne (England)	½	0	1	0	0	0	1	1	½	X	0	1	0	1	0	½	1	0	1	0	1	1	10½
11	Carl August Walbrodt (German Empire)	½	½	0	0	0	0	1	1	½	1	X	0	½	0	½	½	0	½	½	1	1	1	10
12	David Janowski (France)	0	1	0	0	1	0	½	½	1	0	1	X	½	0	0	½	0	1	½	1	0	1	9½
13	James Mason (England)	0	0	½	1	0	½	0	0	0	1	½	½	X	1	0	1	½	0	1	1	0	1	9½
14	Amos Burn (England)	0	0	0	0	½	½	0	0	0	0	1	1	0	X	0	½	1	1	1	1	1	1	9½
15	Isidor Gunsberg (England)	0	0	0	½	0	0	0	1	½	1	½	1	1	1	X	0	1	½	0	1	0	0	9
16	Henry Bird (England)	0	½	0	0	1	0	½	0	½	½	½	½	0	½	1	X	1	½	0	½	½	1	9
17	Adolf Albin (Romania)	0	½	½	0	0	1	½	½	½	0	1	1	½	0	0	0	X	0	0	1	1	½	8½
18	Georg Marco (Austria)	½	0	0	0	0	½	0	0	½	1	½	0	1	0	½	½	1	X	1	1	0	½	8½
19	William Pollock (Canada)	0	0	0	1	1	0	0	½	½	0	½	½	0	0	1	1	1	0	X	0	0	1	8
20	Jacques Mieses (German Empire)	0	½	½	½	½	½	0	0	½	1	0	0	0	0	0	½	0	0	1	X	1	1	7½
21	Samuel Tinsley (England)	0	0	0	0	0	0	1	0	0	0	0	1	1	0	1	½	0	1	1	0	X	1	7½
22	Beniamino Vergani (Italy)	0	0	0	0	0	0	0	0	1	0	0	0	0	0	1	0	½	½	0	0	0	X	3

From this table, it can be seen that tournament winner Pillsbury lost to Chigorin, Lasker and Schlechter; drew with Blackburne, Walbrodt and Marco; and won his remaining 15 games.

=== Swiss-system tournaments ===
In Swiss-system tournaments, results are usually displayed on a round by round basis. There are variants to the way Swiss tournaments are displayed, such as listing wins by the letter "W", losses by the letter "L" and draws by the letter "D". Additional symbols may also be used, such as indicating wins by forfeit with "X", losses by forfeit with "F", half point byes (i.e. byes requested by the player) with "H", full point byes (unpaired due to odd number of players) with "B" etc. The following table shows the result of the 1991 Women's Interzonal Tournament in Subotica, Serbia, a qualifying event for the 1993 Women's World Championship.

1991 Women's Interzonal Tournament
	Player	1	2	3	4	5	6	7	8	9	10	11	12	13	Points	Tie break
1	Nona Gaprindashvili (Soviet Union)	+14	=28	+2	+17	+21	-9	=3	=5	=7	+12	=4	+6	=10	9	67.75
2	Peng Zhaoqin (China)	=26	+33	-1	+20	+27	=5	=16	+9	+3	=4	=6	+7	=12	9	63.75
3	Nana Ioseliani (Soviet Union)	+27	=17	+9	=5	=6	+21	=1	=7	-2	=8	+24	+11	=4	8½	61.25
4	Irina Levitina (USA)	-25	=24	-33	+34	+15	+10	=6	+14	+16	=2	=1	+9	=3	8½	59.25
5	Wang Pin (China)	=32	+12	+7	=3	=16	=2	+9	=1	+8	=18	=11	-10	=13	8	60.00
6	Qin Kanying (China)	+13	=11	+32	=26	=3	-8	=4	+21	=17	+16	=2	-1	+9	8	55.50
7	Ketevan Arakhamia (Soviet Union)	=18	=20	-5	+33	+32	+17	+8	=3	=1	-9	+14	-2	+19	8	52.75
8	Svetlana Matveeva (Soviet Union)	=28	=14	+15	=9	+10	+6	-7	=16	-5	=3	=12	=18	+29	7½	53.25
9	Alisa Galliamova (Soviet Union)	+29	+16	-3	=8	+26	+1	-5	-2	+21	+7	+18	-4	-6	7½	52.25
10	Ketino Kachiani (Soviet Union)	=31	=26	+18	=16	-8	-4	-15	+33	+20	+25	=13	+5	=1	7½	49.00
11	Marta Litinskaya-Shul (Soviet Union)	+22	=6	-21	=32	+25	-16	=27	+20	=15	+17	=5	-3	+18	7½	48.50
12	Aynur Sofiyeva (Soviet Union)	=20	-5	-26	-29	+35	+34	+31	+27	+24	-1	=8	+14	=2	7½	42.00
13	Ildikó Mádl (Hungary)	-6	+29	=20	-21	+23	=25	-14	-22	+30	+28	=10	+25	=5	7	44.00
14	Cristina Adela Foișor (Romania)	-1	=8	=29	=19	+31	=18	+13	-4	+32	+15	-7	-12	+22	7	43.75
15	Daniela Nuțu-Gajić (Romania)	-16	+22	-8	+35	-4	=20	+10	+32	=11	-14	+33	-19	+26	7	39.00
16	Julia Demina (Soviet Union)	+15	-9	+25	=10	=5	+11	=2	=8	-4	-6	=22	=29	=24	6½	45.50
17	Margarita Voyska (Bulgaria)	+30	=3	+23	-1	=18	-7	=25	=19	=6	-11	=27	+33	=20	6½	41.00
18	Zsuzsa Verőci-Petronic (Hungary)	=7	+34	-10	+28	=17	=14	=21	=24	+25	=5	-9	=8	-11	6½	40.25
19	Tünde Csonkics (Hungary)	=34	-23	=31	=14	=28	+33	=32	=17	=22	-24	+26	+15	-7	6½	37.75
20	Vesna Bašagić (Yugoslavia)	=12	=7	=13	-2	=24	=15	+30	-11	-10	bye	=23	+28	=17	6½	36.00
21	Sanja Vuksanović (Yugoslavia)	+24	=25	+11	+13	-1	-3	=18	-6	-9	-26	+34	=23	bye	6½	33.25
22	Gordana Marković (Yugoslavia)	-11	-15	+30	=31	=29	-32	+28	+13	=19	=23	=16	=27	-14	6	37.25
23	Mirjana Marić (Yugoslavia)	=33	+19	-17	-27	-13	=28	+29	=31	=26	=22	=20	=21	=30	6	36.25
24	Irina Chelushkina (Soviet Union)	-21	=4	+34	-25	=20	+29	+26	=18	-12	+19	-3	-13	=16	6	36.00
25	Anna-Maria Botsari (Greece)	+4	=21	-16	+24	-11	=13	=17	+26	-18	-10	-28	+35	=27	6	36.00
26	Beatriz MacArthur (USA)	=2	=10	+12	=6	-9	+27	-24	-25	=23	+21	-19	bye	-15	6	35.25
27	Nataša Bojković (Yugoslavia)	-3	+30	=28	+23	-2	-26	=11	-12	=31	+34	=17	=22	=25	6	34.25
28	Constanze Jahn (Germany)	=8	=1	=27	-18	=19	=23	-22	=35	bye	-13	+25	-20	+33	6	29.75
29	Suzana Maksimović (Yugoslavia)	-9	-13	=14	+12	=22	-24	-23	bye	=34	+35	+30	=16	-8	6	27.50
30	Johanna Paasikangas (Finland)	-17	-27	-22	bye	=33	+35	-20	+34	-13	+32	-29	+31	=23	6	22.00
31	Sheila Jackson (England)	=10	-32	=19	=22	-14	bye	-12	=23	=27	-33	+35	-30	+34	5½	
32	Claudia Amura (Argentina)	=5	+31	-6	=11	-7	+22	=19	-15	-14	-30	bye	=35	-34	5	24.25
33	Khương Thị Hồng Nhung (Vietnam)	=23	-2	+4	-7	=30	-19	bye	-10	+35	+31	-15	-17	-28	5	22.50
34	Niina Koskela (Finland)	=19	-18	-24	-4	bye	-12	+35	-30	=29	-27	-21	=32	-31	3½	
35	Sylvia Chidi (Nigeria)	FF*	FF*	bye	-15	-12	-30	-34	=28	-33	-29	-31	-25	+32	2½	

Sylvia Chidi of Nigeria didn't enter the tournament until after the first two rounds were played, so her first two games are listed as forfeited.

== Relaying moves and broadcasting ==
Relaying moves formerly required another person to copy the moves of the players on a large demonstration board behind the players, and then transmit them via radio or telegram. Advancements in camera technology allowed zooming clearly at the players' board, although relaying moves was still done manually. In the early 2000s, autosensory boards were introduced, allowing moves to be relayed instantaneously, but are not commonly used due to their cost.

In elite tournaments, besides cameras on the players' boards, there are also chess commentators – strong chess players who comment on the game and explain the thought processes and plans of the game. Advances in chess engines also allow for casual viewers to evaluate the position in real time; for this reason tournament broadcasts commonly include a 30-minute delay.

== Disabled players ==
FIDE has rules for disabled players, with the aim of facilitating competition on an equal footing with able-bodied players.

Although the Blind Chess Olympiad is the most significant chess event for the blind and visually impaired, players in either group can participate at most standard tournaments including international ones. In some cases, specially designed chessboards with raised squares and pegs are used to aid the visually handicapped, while a tournament assistant can be used to help players with other physical handicaps.

== Tournament categories ==
FIDE uses tournament results to determine whether a player has qualified for a title, such as Grandmaster. For a number of years, starting in 1970, FIDE classified tournaments in categories according to the average Elo rating of the participants, as part of the calculation of whether a particular tournament result could count towards a particular title. The starting category for master-level tournaments was category I, which applied to a tournament whose participants had an average rating from 2251 to 2275. From 2276 to 2300 it was a category II tournament, and so on with a further category every 25 points. Categories are no longer used in these calculations, but informally, strong tournaments are sometimes described by category. Through 2005, the strongest tournaments had been classified category XXI. The Zurich Chess Challenge 2014, held from 29 January to 4 February 2014, was the first ever category XXIII tournament, with an average Elo rating of 2801. The 2014 Sinquefield Cup, held from 27 August to 7 September, was the second category XXIII tournament, with an average Elo rating of 2802.

Cat.	Elo range
I	2251–2275
II	2276–2300
III	2301–2325
IV	2326–2350
V	2351–2375
VI	2376–2400
VII	2401–2425
VIII	2426–2450

Cat.	Elo range
IX	2451–2475
X	2476–2500
XI	2501–2525
XII	2526–2550
XIII	2551–2575
XIV	2576–2600
XV	2601–2625
XVI	2626–2650

Cat.	Elo range
XVII	2651–2675
XVIII	2676–2700
XIX	2701–2725
XX	2726–2750
XXI	2751–2775
XXII	2776–2800
XXIII	2801–2825

=== Tournament classes ===
To gauge tournaments held before 1970, Jeff Sonas devised an unofficial class system, intended to roughly correspond to categories. This is simply based on the presence or absence of the world's ten highest-ranked players at the time, and does not involve rating numbers.

According to this system, the Vienna 1882 chess tournament would compare in strength to Linares 1993.

== Time controls ==
A time control is a mechanism in tournament play that allows each round of the match to finish in a timely fashion so that the tournament can proceed. The three main types of time controls used in chess tournaments are blitz, standard, and compensation.

=== Blitz ===
In blitz chess (also known as sudden death chess) each player starts with a fixed amount of time for all their moves of the game. The FIDE Handbook designates the following common blitz time controls:

- Bullet: one or two minutes per side.
- Blitz: less than 10 minutes per side (often 5 minutes), sometimes with a small time increment every move.
- Rapid: 10–60 minutes per side (often 25 minutes), sometimes with a small time increment every move.
- Armageddon: a single game guaranteed to produce a decisive result, because Black has draw odds (that is, for Black, a draw is equivalent to a victory). To compensate, White has more time on the clock.

Blitz time controls increase the odds that a player would "lose on time", meaning forfeiture of the game due to expiration of their clock time. Blitz tournaments are often documented with the notation "G/5" or "G/15", meaning "game in 5" and "game in 15", respectively.

=== Standard ===
In standard time controls (STCs) a player has a set amount of time to complete a specified number of moves. If the specified number of moves is met, the player's time will rejuvenate. The first standard time controls, introduced in 1861, were 24 moves in two hours, with the average game lasting five hours. In the mid-1980s, a new format, 40 moves in two hours, proved popular because few games lasted over 60 moves.

=== Compensation ===
There are two main forms that provide compensation for both the time lost in physically making a move and ensuring that a player can avoid having an ever-decreasing amount of time remaining.

- Simple delay (also known as countdown delay and US delay). When it becomes a player's turn to move, the clock waits for the delay period before starting to subtract from the player's remaining time. For example, if the delay is five seconds, the clock waits five seconds before counting down. The time is not accumulated. If the player moves within the delay period, no time is added or subtracted from his remaining time. There is also Bronstein delay which displays the delay differently but is mathematically equivalent to simple delay.
- Increment, invented by Bobby Fischer. When it becomes a player's turn to move, the delay is added to the player's remaining time. For example, if the delay is five seconds and the player has ten minutes remaining on his clock, when his clock is activated, he now has ten minutes and five seconds remaining. Time can be accumulated, so if the player moves within the delay period, his remaining time increases. This form of time control is common on internet chess servers.

== Prizes ==
The winners of chess tournaments are often rewarded with monetary prizes. Often, the chess tournament draws its prizes from a prize fund, dispensing rewards for all the winners in each section. For example, the 2008 World Open chess tournament had a prize fund of $400,000. The winner of the open section was rewarded $30,000, while the winners of lesser sections were rewarded subsequently smaller amounts. Other chess tournaments, such as the World Chess Championship, also reward the winners with a title, such as "World Chess Champion". Lesser tournaments sometimes replace monetary rewards with book prizes or trophies.

== See also ==
- List of strong chess tournaments
- List of mini chess tournaments
- World Chess Championship
- Women's World Chess Championship
- World Junior Chess Championship
- Candidates Tournament
- Arbiter (chess)
- Tie-breaking in Swiss-system tournaments
