= Jovanović =

Jovanović (Serbian Cyrillic: Јовановић, pronounced [jǒʋanoʋitɕ, joʋǎː-]) is the most common Serbian surname. It derives from Jovan, which is comparable to John in English. The part ov designates possession: Jovanov means John's. The suffix ić is a diminutive designation, or descendant designation. It is spelled in Austria as Jovanovic. So, the last name can be translated as John's son leading to the English equivalent last name of Johnson. Notable people with the surname include:

== Jovanović ==
- Ana Jovanović (born 1984), Serbian tennis player
- Anastas Jovanović (1817–1899), Serbian photographer
- Anđelko Jovanović (born 1999), Montenegrin footballer
- Arso Jovanović (1907–1948), Montenegrin soldier and Partisan
- Biljana Jovanović (1953–1996), Serbian writer, peace activist and feminist
- Boris Jovanović (born 1972), Serbian footballer
- Borislav Jovanović (born 1941), a Montenegrin writer
- Borislav "Boki" Jovanović (born 1986), a Serbian footballer
- Borivoje Jovanović-Brana (1883–1905), Serbian guerrilla
- Boro Jovanović (born 1939), a former Yugoslav tennis player
- Boyan Jovanovic (born 1951), a Serbian-American economist
- Branislav Jovanović (born 1985), Serbian footballer
- Čedomir Jovanović, (born 1971), Serbian politician
- Đorđe Jovanović (sculptor) (1861–1953), Serbian sculptor
- Dragutin Jovanović-Lune (1892–1932), Serbian guerrilla
- Goran Jovanović (footballer, born 1972), Serbian football player
- Goran Jovanović (footballer, born 1977), Serbian football player
- Igor Jovanović (born 1989), Croatian born footballer
- Ilija Jovanović-Pčinjski (1878–1913), Serbian guerrilla
- Ljiljana Jovanović (1930–2012), Serbian actress
- Ljubomir Jovanović (1865–1928), Serbian politician and historian
- Ljubomir S. Jovanović (1877–1913), Serbian guerrilla
- Marko Jovanović (footballer, born 1978), Serbian footballer
- Marko Jovanović (footballer, born 1988), Serbian footballer
- Mihailo Jovanović (footballer, born 1989), Serbian footballer
- Mihailo Jovanović (metropolitan) (1826–1898), former Metropolitan of Belgrade
- Miloš Jovanović (born 1976), Serbian politician
- Nataša Jovanović (born 1966), Serbian politician
- Nataša Jovanović (Serbian politician, born 1967), Serbian politician
- Nemanja Jovanović (born 1984), Serbian footballer
- Paja Jovanović (1859–1957), Serbian realist painter
- Sanja Jovanović (born 1986), Croatian swimmer
- Slobodan Jovanović (1869–1958), Serbian prime minister
- Suzana Jovanović (born 1969), a popular Serbian pop-folk singer
- Toša Jovanović (1846–1893), Serbian actor
- Vasa Jovanović (1874–1970), Serbian lawyer and politician, founder of the Chetnik movement
- Vera Jovanović (born 1947), Serbian politician
- Vesna Jovanovic (born 1976), Serbian-American artist
- Vladimir Jovanović (1833–1922), Serbian political theorist and politician
- Vladislav Jovanović (1933–2026), Serbian diplomat
- Vukašin Jovanović (footballer, born 1996), Serbian footballer
- Zlatko Jovanović (born 1984), Bosnian basketball player

=== Namesakes ===
- Aleksandar Jovanović
- Dragan Jovanović
- Dušan Jovanović
- Ivan Jovanović
- Jovan Jovanović
- Milan Jovanović
- Nikola Jovanović
- Vlastimir Jovanović
- Željko Jovanović

== Jovanovich ==
- Alex Jovanovich (born 1975), American artist, writer, and editor
- Brandon Jovanovich (born 1970), American operatic tenor
- Drago Jovanovich
- Marija Jovanovich, Australian air force test pilot
- Nenad M. Jovanovich, Deacon of the Serbian Orthodox Church
- William Jovanovich (1920–2001), American publisher and writer

== Other spellings ==
- Marie Yovanovitch (born 1958), US diplomat and figure in first impeachment of Donald Trump
- Vida Yovanovich, Mexican photographer

== See also ==
- Jovanovac (disambiguation)
