= Vesna (given name) =

- Pronunciation: VEHS-nah
- Gender: female

Origin
- Origin: Slavic
- Meaning: spring; mythological Slavic goddess of spring.
- Region of origin: Eastern Europe

Vesna (Cyrillic: Весна) is a Slavic female name derived from the name of Vesna, an ancient Slavic goddess of spring. It means "spring" in some Slavic languages. It is in common use in Croatia, North Macedonia, Serbia, Bosnia and Herzegovina, Montenegro and Slovenia. It is also given, but more rarely, in Russia, Ukraine, Bulgaria, the Czech Republic, and Slovakia. It rarely appears in Poland (as Wiosna, Wesna, and Vesna).

In Croatia, the name Vesna was the second most common feminine given name between 1960 and 1969, while appearing among the most common ones in two earlier decades as well.

== People named Vesna ==
- Vesna Bušić (born 1983), Croatian-German wrestler known professionally as Wesna
- Vesna Čitaković (born 1979), Serbian volleyball player
- Vesna Dolonc (born 1989), Serbian tennis player
- Vesna Györkös Žnidar (born 1977), Slovenian politician
- Vesna Jovanovic (born 1976), American visual artist
- Vesna Krmpotić (1932–2018), Croatian writer and translator
- Vesna Main (born 1955) European writer
- Vesna Milačić Kaja (born 1968), Montenegrin singer
- Vesna Milanović-Litre (born 1986), Croatian handball player
- Vesna Milivojević (born 2001), Association football player
- Vesna Milošević (born 1955), Yugoslav handball player
- Vesna Mišanović (born 1964), Bosnian chess player
- Vesna Parun (1922–2010) Croatian poet
- Vesna Pešić (born 1940), Serbian politician and sociologist
- Vesna Pietrzak (born 2009), Polish rhythmic gymnast
- Vesna Pisarović (born 1978), Croatian singer
- Vesna Pusić (born 1953), Croatian politician and sociologist
- Vesna Radović (born 1954), Yugoslav/Austrian handball player
- Vesna Rožič (1987–2013), Slovenian chess player
- Vesna Škare-Ožbolt (born 1961), Croatian politician
- Vesna Smiljković (born 1983), Serbian footballer
- Vesna Stojanović (born 1973), Serbian footballer
- Vesna Teršelič (born 1962), Croatian peace activist
- Vesna Tomić (born 1974), Serbian politician
- Vesna Trivalić (born 1965), Serbian actress
- Vesna Vulović (1950–2016), Serbian flight attendant
- Vesna Zmijanac (born 1957), Serbian singer

== Fictional people named Vesna ==
- Vesna, a character from the movie Samotáři.
- Vesna in Alien Nation.
- Vesna Hood, a tavern waitress and romanceable character from the game The Witcher.
- Vesna Strivozha, a playable fae character in the video game Genshin Impact's Snezhnaya region

== See also ==
- Slavic names
