= Aco Petrović =

Aco Petrović may refer to:

- Aleksandar Petrović (basketball, born February 1959), Croatian basketball coach and former basketball player
- Aleksandar Petrović (basketball, born October 1959) (1959–2014), Serbian basketball coach
- Aco Petrović (politician) (born 1958), Serbian politician

== See also ==
- Aleksandar Petrović (disambiguation)
