= Anna Gershnik =

American chess player (born 1975)

Personal information
- Native name: Анна Гершник
- Born: 13 September 1975 (age 50) Kaliningrad, Russian SSR, Soviet Union

Chess career
- Country: Soviet Union (until 1990); Israel (1990–2005); United States (since 2005)
- Title: Woman Grandmaster (1995)
- FIDE rating: 2275 (July 1999)
- Peak rating: 2335 (July 1995)

Anna Gershnik (Russian: Анна Гершник; née Segal, born 13 September 1975) is a Soviet-born American chess player. She received the FIDE title of Woman Grandmaster (WGM) in 1995.

== Biography ==
In 1989, in Aguadilla she won World Youth Chess Championship in girl's U14 age category. The following year, her family went to Israel, and Anna Gershnik was immediately among the top chess players of this country. In 1991, in Graz she took the third place (behind Tatjana Lematschko and Constanze Jahn) in the FIDE Women's World Chess Championship Zonal tournament. In the following years she represented Israel several times at the World Junior Chess Championships (1992, 1993 - U18 girls, 1995 - U20 girls) and European Junior Chess Championships (1994, 1995 - U20 girls). In 1993, Anna Gershnik shared 4th place in the tournament First Saturday FS12 IM-A in Budapest. In 1998, she advanced to the semi-finals of the Israeli Women's Chess Championship play-off, where she lost Ella Pitam.

Anna Gershnik played for Israel in the Women's Chess Olympiads:

- In 1990, at third board in the 29th Chess Olympiad (women) in Novi Sad (+5, =1, -4),
- In 1992, at first board in the 30th Chess Olympiad (women) in Manila (+4, =2, -6),
- In 1994, at second board in the 31st Chess Olympiad (women) in Moscow (+7, =5, -1),
- In 1996, at second board in the 32nd Chess Olympiad (women) in Yerevan (+2, =1, -4),
- In 1998, at first reserve board in the 33rd Chess Olympiad (women) in Elista (+2, =1, -3).

Anna Gershnik played for Israel in the European Team Chess Championship:

- In 1992, at second board in the 1st European Team Chess Championship (women) in Debrecen (+3, =1, -2).

In 1999, Anna Gershnik ended her active chess career.
