= Aleksandar Jovanović =

Aleksandar Jovanović may refer to:

== Sports ==
=== Association football ===
- Aleksandar Jovanović (footballer, born 1984), Bosnian Serb association football player
- Aleksandar Jovanović (footballer, born 1985), Serbian association football midfielder
- Aleksandar Jovanović (soccer, born 1989), Australian soccer centre-back
- Aleksandar Jovanović (footballer, born July 1992), Serbian association football goalkeeper
- Aleksandar Jovanović (footballer, born December 1992), Serbian association football goalkeeper

== Politics ==
=== Politicians ===
- Aleksandar Jovanović (politician) (born 1976), Serbian politician
- Aleksandar Jovanović (journalist) (born 1968), Serbian journalist (who is also a politician)
- Aleksandar Jovanović Ćuta (born 1966), Serbian environmental and political activist

== Other ==
- Aleksandar Jovanovic, an actor who has acted in the film The Titan
- Aleksandar Jovanović (general), a Serbian military general

== See also ==
- Aleksa Jovanović (disambiguation)
- Jovanović (surname)
