= Sheila Jackson =

Sheila Jackson may refer to:

- Sheila Jackson Lee (born 1950), née Sheila Jackson, American politician from Texas
- Sheila Jackson (Shameless), a character from the British TV series Shameless
  - Shelia Gallagher (formally Jackson), character from the American remake
- Sheila Jackson (chess player), English chess player
