= Dušan Jovanović =

Dušan Jovanović may refer to:

- Dušan Jovanović (footballer, born 1948), former OFK Beograd midfielder, who played on the gold-medal team for Yugoslavia at the 1971 Mediterranean Games
- Dušan Jovanović (footballer, born 1971), retired Yugoslavian/Serbian footballer
- Dušan Jovanović (footballer, born 2006), Serbian footballer
- Dušan Jovanović Čukin (1891–1945), Serbian sculptor
- Dušan Jovanović (theatre director) (1939–2020), Slovene theatre director and writer
- Dušan Jovanović, a boy who was murdered in Belgrade in 1997; see Murder of Dušan Jovanović
- Dušan Jovanović, Serbian civilian awarded the status of Righteous among the Nations by Yad Vashem; see List of Serbian Righteous Among the Nations
