= Milan Jovanović =

Milan Jovanović may refer to:

- Milan Jovanović (footballer, born 1981), Serbian footballer
- Milan Jovanović (footballer, born July 1983), Montenegrin footballer
- Milan Jovanović (footballer, born October 1983), Serbian footballer
- Milan Jovanović (handballer) (born 1998), Serbian handball player
- Milan Jovanović (strongman) (born 1970), Serbian powerlifter

== See also ==
- Jovanović (surname)
- Photographic Studio of Milan Jovanović
