= List of Serbian Righteous Among the Nations =

During the German occupation of Serbia, Serbian Jews were persecuted and sent to extermination camps. Members of the Serbian Jewish community were helped by various Serbian individual rescuers and groups. As of 1 January 2018, 139 Serbians that have been recognized by Yad Vashem as of Righteous Among the Nations for their actions during the Holocaust.

== List ==
- Svetozar Milenković and his wife, Vida Petrović–Milenković
- Aleksandar Petrović, brother of Vida Petrović, and son of Mihailo Petrović.
- Dr. Dušan Jovanović: "saved the lives of twenty Jews by hiding them in the municipal hospital in Novi-Sad which he ran."
- Andrija Latal: "saved Laura, Lisa, and Rochele Elias by hiding them in his home in Sarajevo for two years."
- Petar Žanković: "helped smuggle and hide the Zlatković family during the years 1942-1943. In reprisal for these actions, the Nazis punished both him and his family."
- Klara Baić: "concealed the children of the Danberg family in her home. Providing them with shelter in her home in June 1944, they remained there until the liberation of her town of Subotica in October 1944."
- Slobodan and Milenija Knežević: "took into their home Julia Irenfeld, who fled the Nazis in March 1943 when she was in her ninth month of pregnancy. Her son, Ilan Doron, born in hiding, lives today in Haifa and has three children."
- Dragoljub Trajković
- Borivoje and Grozdana Bondžić
- Ljubica Mandušić-Gazikalović, and daughter Jelica Ranković
- Dr. Đorđe Marinković and his wife Stanka
