= Milan Antonović =

Serbian architect

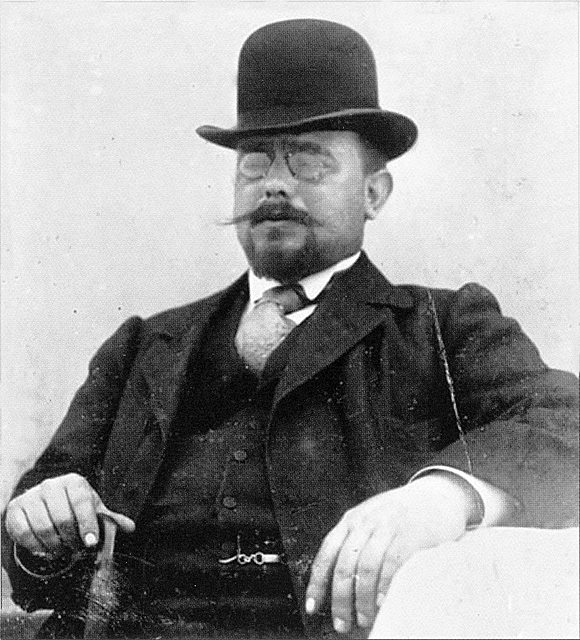
Antonović in 1898

Milan Antonović (Милан Антоновић; Belgrade, Principality of Serbia, 1850 – Belgrade, Kingdom of Yugoslavia, 1929) was a Serbian architect. His style is characterized by Eclecticism in architecture, with influences from both academic Neoclassicism architecture and the Vienna Secession.

== Works in Belgrade ==
- Anker Bar at 26 Terazije, built in 1893;
- Elementary School at Palilula (Osnovna skola "Vuk Karadzic", 41 Takovska Street, 1894);
- Photographic Studio of Milan Jovanović, built in 1903;
- House of Dimitrije Živadinović, built in 1904;
- Military Hospital Complex at Vračar (Vojna bolnica na Vračaru, 1904-1909);
- Grand Hotel at 5 Knez Mihailova Street, built in 1919;
- Home of the Society for the Beautification of Vračar (Dom Drustva za ulepsavanja Vračara), built in 1926.
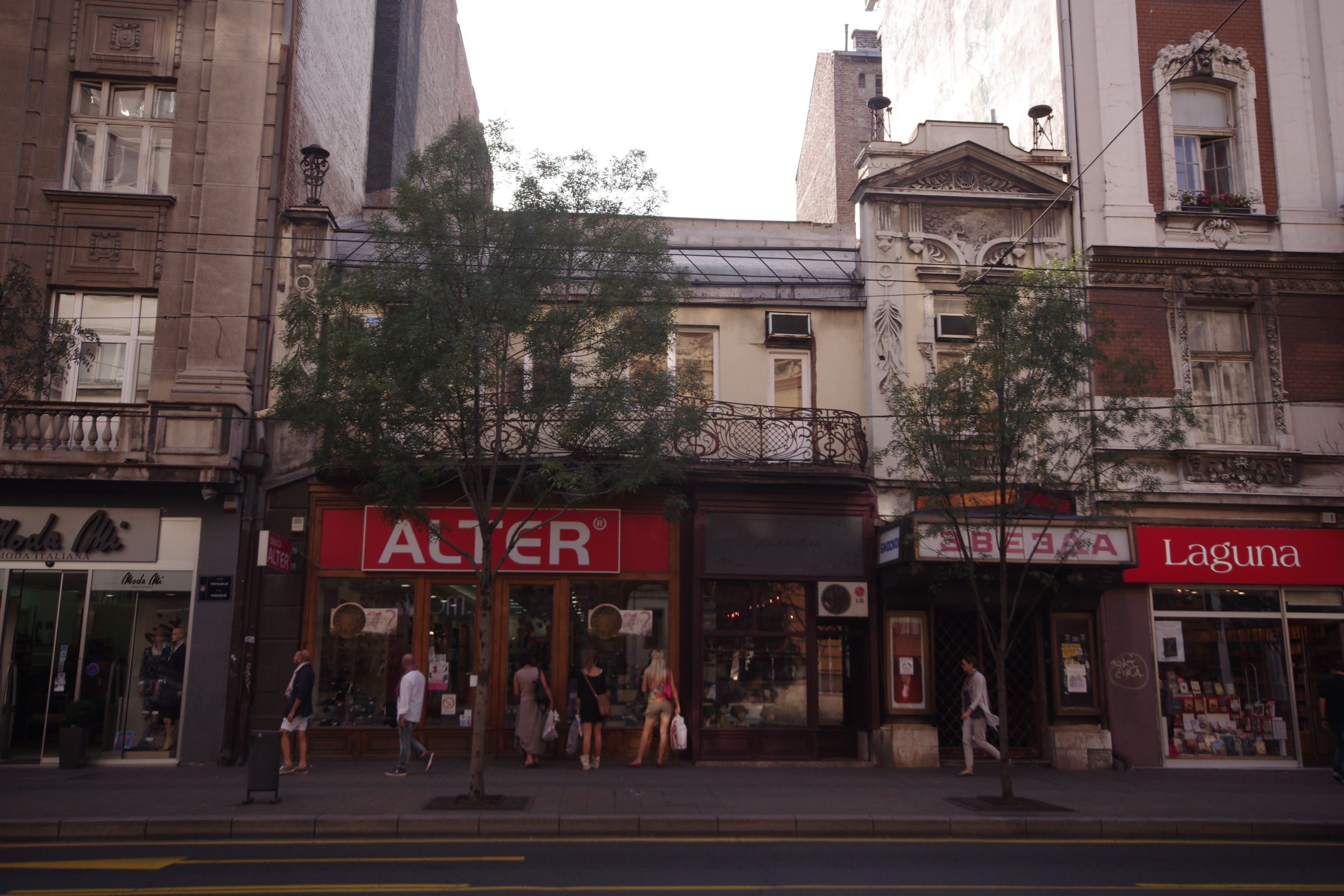
Photographic Studio of Milan Jovanović, 1903

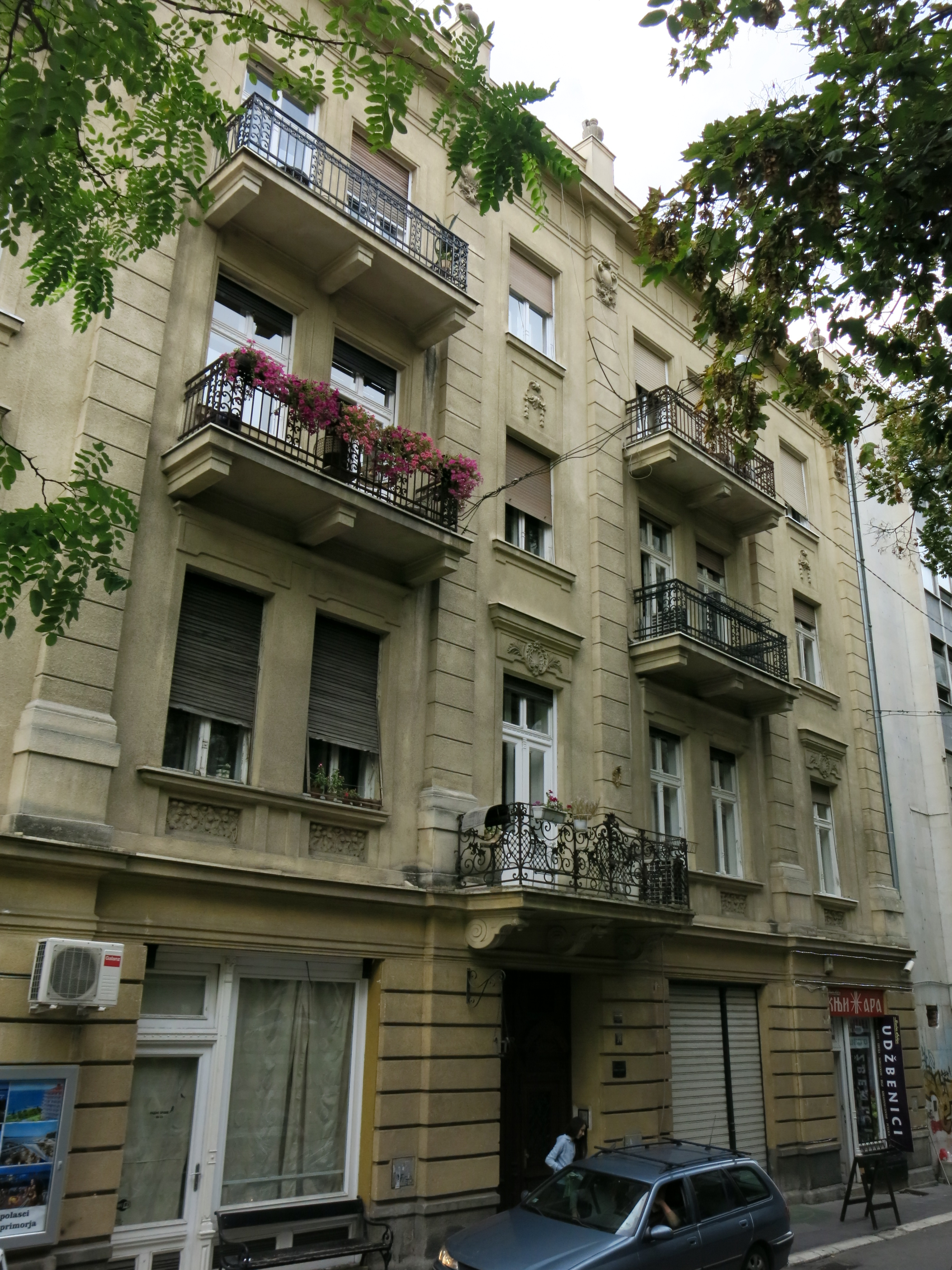
House of Dimitrije Živadinović, 1904

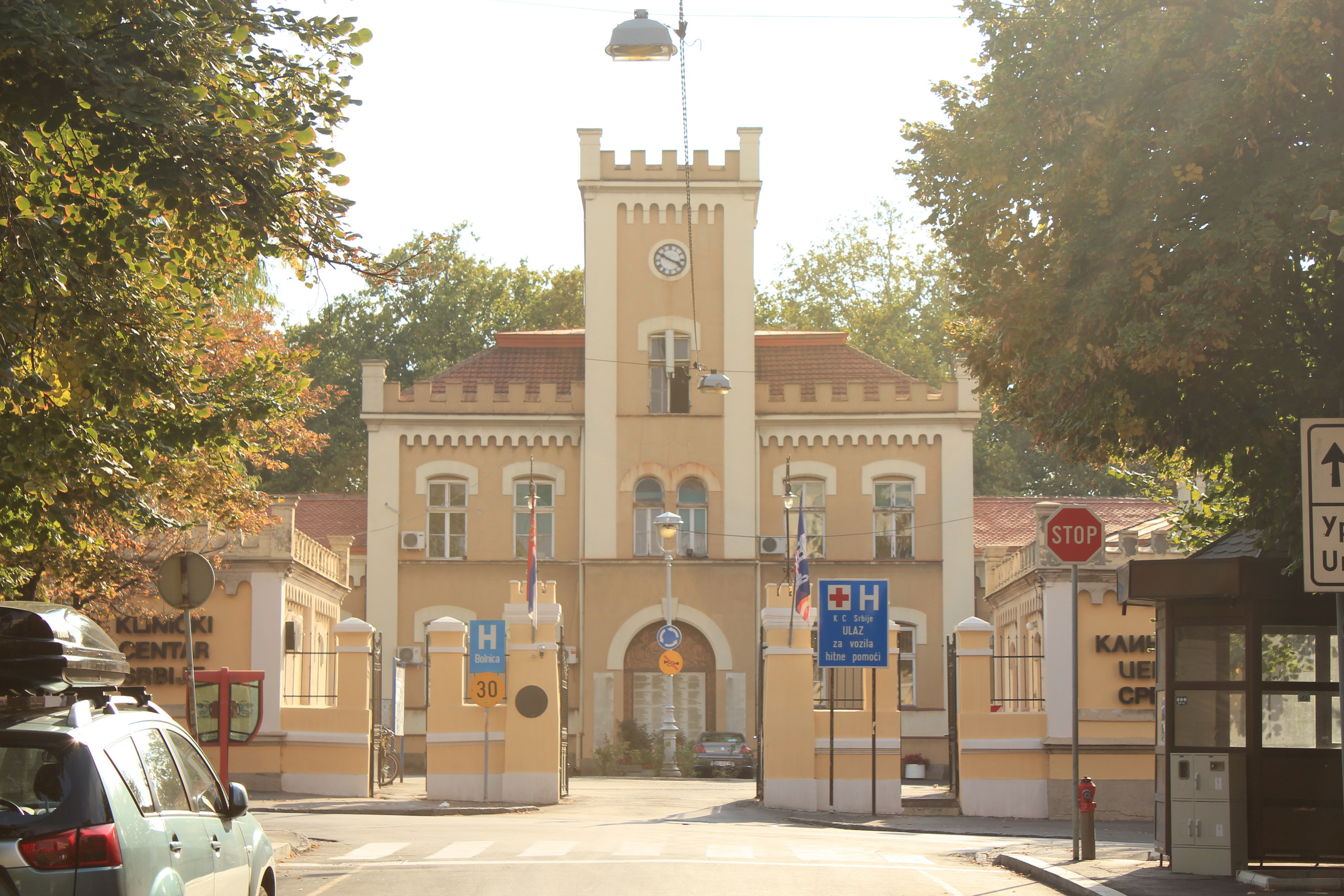
Vojna bolnica na Vračaru, 1904-1909

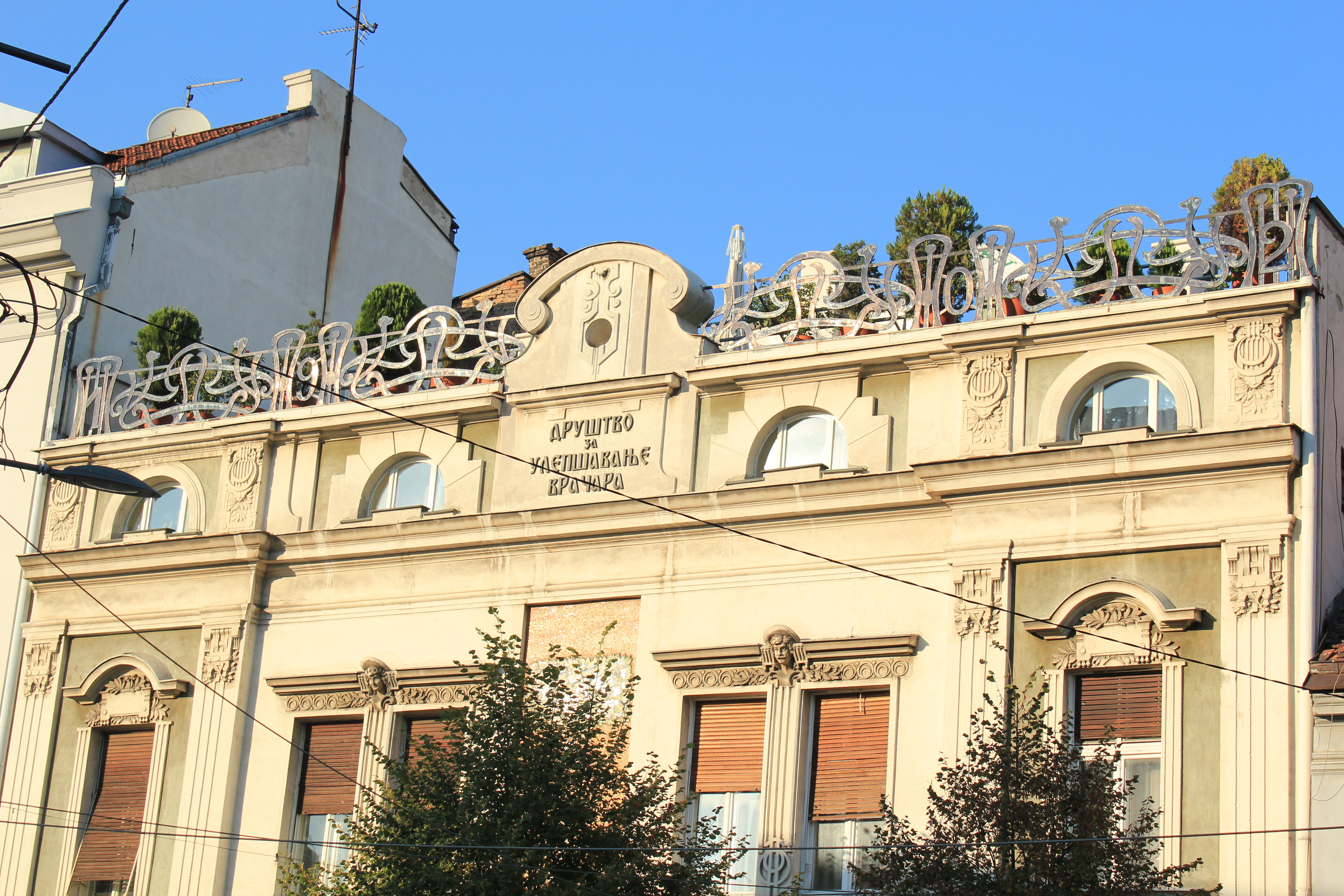
Dom Drustva za ulepsavanja Vračara, 1926

== See also ==
- List of Serbian architects
