= Ivan Jovanović =

Ivan Jovanović may refer to:

- Ivan Jovanović (coach) (born 1962), Serbian football player, manager and coach
- Ivan Jovanović (footballer, born 1978), Serbian player
- Ivan Jovanović (footballer, born 1990), Serbian football midfielder
- Ivan Jovanović (footballer, born 1991), Croatian football forward
- Ivan Jovanović or "Crni"(died 1958), Bosnian war criminal from Šurmanci, Herzegovina
