= Jovanovac =

Jovanovac may refer to:

- Jovanovac, Kragujevac, village in Serbia
- Jovanovac, Merošina, a village in Serbia
- Jovanovac, Croatia, a 19th- and 20th-century name of Ivanovac, a village near Antunovac
- Šima Jovanovac, Croatian singer
