= Aleksandar Petrović =

Aleksandar or Saša Petrović may refer to:

== Basketball ==
- Aleksandar Petrović (basketball, born February 1959), Croatian professional basketball coach and former player
- Aleksandar Petrović (basketball, born October 1959) (1959–2014), Serbian professional basketball coach
- Aleksandar Petrović (basketball, born 1972), Macedonian professional basketball coach
- Aleksandar Petrović (basketball, born 1987), Serbian professional basketball player

== Football ==
- Aleksandar Petrović (footballer, born 1914) (1914–1987), Serbian football forward turned manager
- Aleksandar Petrović (footballer, born 1983), Serbian professional football right-back
- Aleksandar Petrović (footballer, born 1 February 1985), Serbian football attacking midfielder
- Aleksandar Petrović (footballer, born 8 February 1985), Serbian football centre-back
- Saša Petrović (footballer) (born 1966), Montenegrin football manager and former goalkeeper

== Other ==
- Aleksandar Petrović (film director) (1929–1994), Serbian film director
- Aleksandar Petrović (musician), a member of the Orthodox Celts
- Aleksandar Petrović (priest) (1917–1944), Serbian Righteous Among the Nations
- Saša Petrović (actor) (1962–2023), Bosnian actor
- Alex Petrovic (born 1992), Canadian ice-hockey player

== See also ==
- Aleksandro Petrović (born 1988), Bosnian/German footballer
