= Aleksa Jovanović =

Aleksa Jovanović may refer to:

- Aleksa Jovanović (footballer) (born 1999), Serbian association football midfielder
- Aleksa Jovanović (politician) (1846–1920), Prime Minister of Serbia, 1900–1901

== See also ==
- Aleksandar Jovanović (disambiguation)
