= Women's World Chess Championship 1993 =

The 1993 Women's World Chess Championship was won by Xie Jun, who successfully defended her title against challenger Nana Ioseliani in the title match.

== 1991 Interzonal Tournament ==
As part of the qualification process, an Interzonal tournament was held in Subotica in November 1991, featuring the best players from each FIDE zone. 35 players took part with the top six qualifying for the Candidates Tournament. For the first time, the women's Interzonal was played as a 13-round Swiss system tournament.

1991 Women's Interzonal Tournament
	Player	1	2	3	4	5	6	7	8	9	10	11	12	13	Points	Tie break
1	Nona Gaprindashvili (Soviet Union)	+14	=28	+2	+17	+21	-9	=3	=5	=7	+12	=4	+6	=10	9	67.75
2	Peng Zhaoqin (China)	=26	+33	-1	+20	+27	=5	=16	+9	+3	=4	=6	+7	=12	9	63.75
3	Nana Ioseliani (Soviet Union)	+27	=17	+9	=5	=6	+21	=1	=7	-2	=8	+24	+11	=4	8½	61.25
4	Irina Levitina (USA)	-25	=24	-33	+34	+15	+10	=6	+14	+16	=2	=1	+9	=3	8½	59.25
5	Wang Pin (China)	=32	+12	+7	=3	=16	=2	+9	=1	+8	=18	=11	-10	=13	8	60.00
6	Qin Kanying (China)	+13	=11	+32	=26	=3	-8	=4	+21	=17	+16	=2	-1	+9	8	55.50
7	Ketevan Arakhamia (Soviet Union)	=18	=20	-5	+33	+32	+17	+8	=3	=1	-9	+14	-2	+19	8	52.75
8	Svetlana Matveeva (Soviet Union)	=28	=14	+15	=9	+10	+6	-7	=16	-5	=3	=12	=18	+29	7½	53.25
9	Alisa Galliamova (Soviet Union)	+29	+16	-3	=8	+26	+1	-5	-2	+21	+7	+18	-4	-6	7½	52.25
10	Ketino Kachiani (Soviet Union)	=31	=26	+18	=16	-8	-4	-15	+33	+20	+25	=13	+5	=1	7½	49.00
11	Marta Litinskaya-Shul (Soviet Union)	+22	=6	-21	=32	+25	-16	=27	+20	=15	+17	=5	-3	+18	7½	48.50
12	Aynur Sofiyeva (Soviet Union)	=20	-5	-26	-29	+35	+34	+31	+27	+24	-1	=8	+14	=2	7½	42.00
13	Ildikó Mádl (Hungary)	-6	+29	=20	-21	+23	=25	-14	-22	+30	+28	=10	+25	=5	7	44.00
14	Cristina Adela Foișor (Romania)	-1	=8	=29	=19	+31	=18	+13	-4	+32	+15	-7	-12	+22	7	43.75
15	Daniela Nuțu-Gajić (Romania)	-16	+22	-8	+35	-4	=20	+10	+32	=11	-14	+33	-19	+26	7	39.00
16	Julia Demina (Soviet Union)	+15	-9	+25	=10	=5	+11	=2	=8	-4	-6	=22	=29	=24	6½	45.50
17	Margarita Voyska (Bulgaria)	+30	=3	+23	-1	=18	-7	=25	=19	=6	-11	=27	+33	=20	6½	41.00
18	Zsuzsa Verőci-Petronic (Hungary)	=7	+34	-10	+28	=17	=14	=21	=24	+25	=5	-9	=8	-11	6½	40.25
19	Tünde Csonkics (Hungary)	=34	-23	=31	=14	=28	+33	=32	=17	=22	-24	+26	+15	-7	6½	37.75
20	Vesna Basagić (Yugoslavia)	=12	=7	=13	-2	=24	=15	+30	-11	-10	bye	=23	+28	=17	6½	36.00
21	Sanja Vuksanović (Yugoslavia)	+24	=25	+11	+13	-1	-3	=18	-6	-9	-26	+34	=23	bye	6½	33.25
22	Gordana Marković (Yugoslavia)	-11	-15	+30	=31	=29	-32	+28	+13	=19	=23	=16	=27	-14	6	37.25
23	Mirjana Marić (Yugoslavia)	=33	+19	-17	-27	-13	=28	+29	=31	=26	=22	=20	=21	=30	6	36.25
24	Irina Chelushkina (Soviet Union)	-21	=4	+34	-25	=20	+29	+26	=18	-12	+19	-3	-13	=16	6	36.00
25	Anna-Maria Botsari (Greece)	+4	=21	-16	+24	-11	=13	=17	+26	-18	-10	-28	+35	=27	6	36.00
26	Beatriz MacArthur (USA)	=2	=10	+12	=6	-9	+27	-24	-25	=23	+21	-19	bye	-15	6	35.25
27	Nataša Bojković (Yugoslavia)	-3	+30	=28	+23	-2	-26	=11	-12	=31	+34	=17	=22	=25	6	34.25
28	Constanze Jahn (Germany)	=8	=1	=27	-18	=19	=23	-22	=35	bye	-13	+25	-20	+33	6	29.75
29	Suzana Maksimović (Yugoslavia)	-9	-13	=14	+12	=22	-24	-23	bye	=34	+35	+30	=16	-8	6	27.50
30	Johanna Paasikangas (Finland)	-17	-27	-22	bye	=33	+35	-20	+34	-13	+32	-29	+31	=23	6	22.00
31	Sheila Jackson (England)	=10	-32	=19	=22	-14	bye	-12	=23	=27	-33	+35	-30	+34	5½	
32	Claudia Amura (Argentina)	=5	+31	-6	=11	-7	+22	=19	-15	-14	-30	bye	=35	-34	5	24.25
33	Khương Thị Hồng Nhung (Vietnam)	=23	-2	+4	-7	=30	-19	bye	-10	+35	+31	-15	-17	-28	5	22.50
34	Niina Koskela (Finland)	=19	-18	-24	-4	bye	-12	+35	-30	=29	-27	-21	=32	-31	3½	
35	Sylvia Chidi (Nigeria)	FF*	FF*	bye	-15	-12	-30	-34	=28	-33	-29	-31	-25	+32	2½	

Sylvia Chidi of Nigeria didn't enter the tournament until after the first two rounds were played, so her first two games are listed as forfeited.

== 1992–93 Candidates Tournament ==
The six qualifiers from the Interzonal Tournament were joined by Chiburdanidze, who had lost the last title match, and Marić, the runner-up from the previous Candidates Tournament. In addition to these eight, FIDE decided to give a wild card to Polgár, who the year before had been the first woman to achieve the grandmaster title through tournament play (world champions Gaprindashvili and Chiburdanidze had only been awarded the title through special judgment by FIDE).

Once again, the Candidates Tournament was contested as a double round-robin tournament in Shanghai in October and November 1992, but this time the top two would then play a short 8-game match to determine the challenger. As expected, Polgár dominated the tournament, finishing a full three points ahead of Ioseliani, who advanced on a better tie-break score than ex-champion Chiburdanidze.

Few observers expected the final to be more than a formality. At the start of the match in Monaco in February 1993, Polgár outrated her opponent by 100 points. After Polgár won the first two games and drew the next three, she needed only one point in the last three games to clinch the win. However, Ioseliani won the sixth game, drew the seventh, and won the eighth to take the match into a two-game tiebreak. Polgár won the first game, but Ioseliani won the second, forcing a second tiebreak. When the pattern repeated – Polgár winning first, then Ioselani – FIDE ruled that the match would be decided by a lottery. This time Ioseliani won, eliminating Polgar from the cycle.

1992 Women's Candidates Tournament
	Player	Rating	1	2	3	4	5	6	7	8	9	Points	Tie break
1	Zsuzsa Polgár (Hungary)	2540	–	1½	1½	1	1½	1½	2	1½	2	12½	
2	Nana Ioseliani (Georgia)	2445	½	–	1	1½	1½	2	0	2	1	9½	70.75
3	Maia Chiburdanidze (Georgia)	2505	½	1	–	½	1½	2	1½	1	1½	9½	68.75
4	Alisa Marić (FR Yugoslavia)	2390	1	½	1½	–	1½	1	1½	1	0	8	65.00
5	Qin Kanying (China)	2315	½	½	½	½	–	½	2	1½	2	8	56.00
6	Irina Levitina (USA)	2415	½	0	0	1	1½	–	1	1½	1	6½	
7	Peng Zhaoqin (China)	2370	0	2	½	½	0	1	–	½	1½	6	46.25
8	Nona Gaprindashvili (Georgia)	2435	½	0	1	1	½	½	1½	–	1	6	46.00
9	Wang Pin (China)	2370	0	1	½	2	0	1	½	1	–	6	45.75

Women's Candidates Final 1993
	1	2	3	4	5	6	7	8	TB1	TB2	TB3	TB4	Total
Zsuzsa Polgár (Hungary)	1	1	½	½	½	0	½	0	1	0	1	0	6
Nana Ioseliani (Georgia)	0	0	½	½	½	1	½	1	0	1	0	1	6

== 1993 Championship Match ==
The championship match was played in Monaco from October 25 to November 17, 1993. It was quite an anticlimax after the controversy of the Candidates Tournament, with Xie Jun winning decisively.

Women's World Championship Match 1993
	1	2	3	4	5	6	7	8	9	10	11	Total
Nana Ioseliani (Georgia)	0	0	½	0	0	1	0	½	0	½	0	2½
Xie Jun (China)	1	1	½	1	1	0	1	½	1	½	1	8½
