= Dušan Jovanović Đukin =

Serbian sculptor (1891–1945)

- Born: 16 June 1891; Kingdom of Serbia
- Died: 27 October 1945 (aged 54); Belgrade, Yugoslavia
- Education: École des Beaux-Arts
- Known for: Sculpting

Dušan Jovanović Đukin (Serbian: Душан Јовановић Ђукин; 16 June 1891 – 27 October 1945) was a Serbian academic sculptor trained in Paris. Cubism was his speciality. He is one of two representatives of the cubist sculpture of his generation, the other was Živojin Lukić.

== Early life ==
Dušan Jovanović Đukin was born and raised in a wealthy patrician family. His father was a court photographer, uncle Paja Jovanović, and he took a pseudonym from his grandfather Stevan Jovanović, a photographer from Vršac when they called him Đuka.

Đukin grew up in his father's photography studio in Belgrade (his father is Milan Jovanović, and artists Paja Jovanović and Svetislav Jovanović are Milan's brothers). Since 1904, it was the first purpose-built photography studio in Serbia. As a child, Dušan went through the horrors of war, and when he came to Paris to study sculpture and painting, he decided on sculpture early because his two uncles lived in Paris and were already well-established artists.

He studied architecture in Dresden, sculpture in Florence, and then studied at the École des Beaux-Arts in Paris. From 1917 to 1927, he stayed in Paris, where he participated in the Exhibition of Yugoslav Artists in 1919. In Belgrade, at the Kolarac People's University, he started an evening art course in 1927, together with the painter Mladen Josić.

== Career ==
After a year, he went to Paris again and returned to Belgrade after four years. He started working as a teacher at the Academy of Applied Arts.

He exhibited at several group exhibitions in the country and abroad (Belgrade, Florence and Paris), but during his lifetime he did not have a single solo exhibition. He was a member of the art group "Lada". He left behind only about thirty sculptures, a small number of drawings, ceramics and medallions. It is known that, when he was not satisfied with the outcome, he destroyed his works. He was also engaged in painting, but none of that has survived.

== Death ==
After a long and severe illness, he died in Belgrade in 1945.

== Works ==
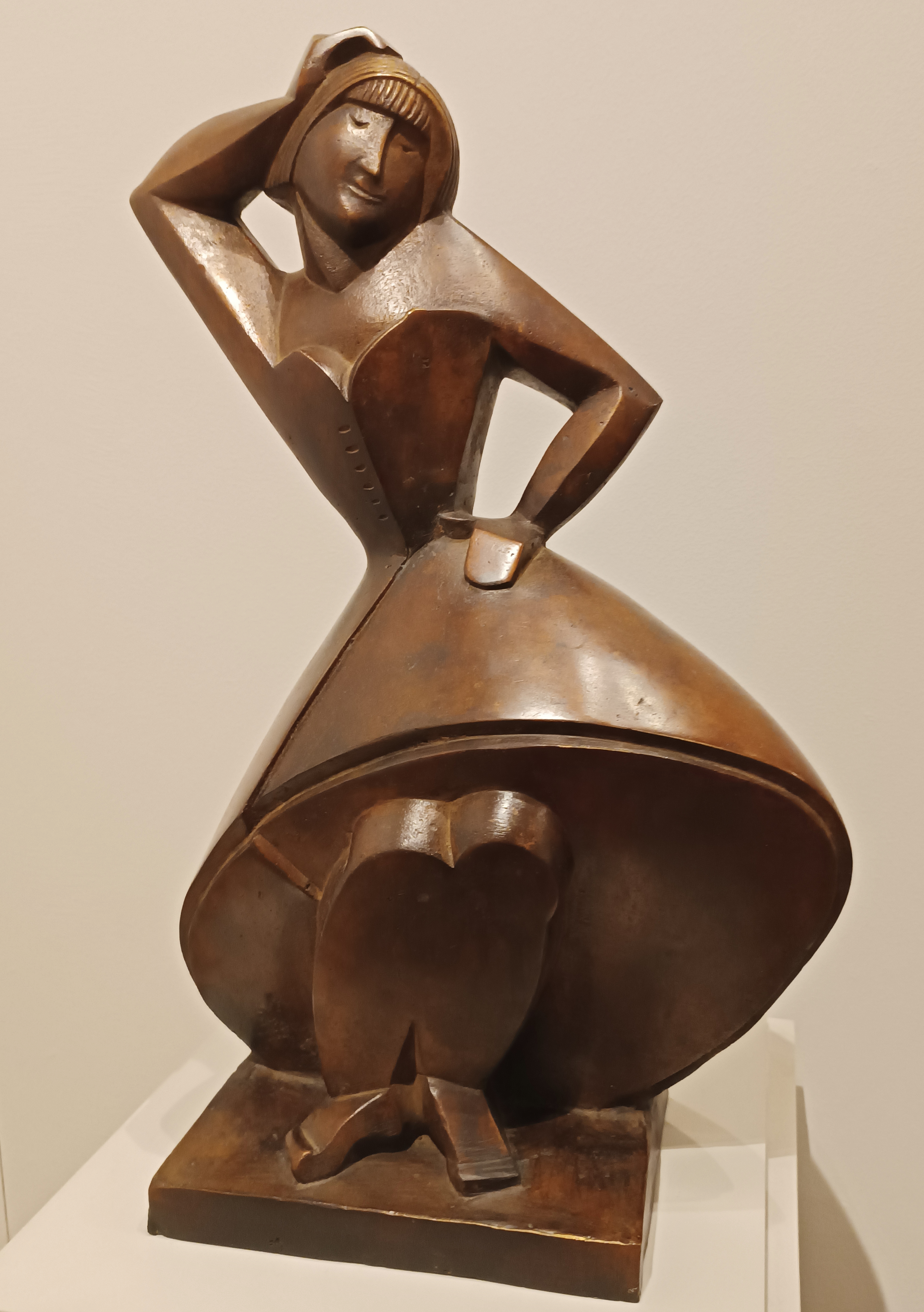
“Female dancer” 1936

His work can be found in the National Museum in Belgrade along with his contemporaries Živojin Lukić, Risto Stijović, Radeta Stanković (1905-1996), Petar Palaviccini, Đorđe Oraovac (1891-1955), Mihailo Tomić (1902-1995), Milan Nedeljković (1896-1947), Vladeta Piperski (1908-1942), Milan Besarabić (1908-2011), and Stevan Bodnarov (1905-1993).

- Girl with flowers:

He adopted the ideas of the Paris School but did not directly adopt the views of Cubism. Retains classic volume and taut mass. He boldly cuts it and introduces innovative geometrizations.

- The Girl with the mandolin

He is even bolder in cutting. It does not go as far as Archipenko in cubist forms. It holds a compact mass and anthropomorphism like a traditional classical sculpture, although it cuts the legs and lowers them. It also sticks to the face and does not count on the side view, while with the Cubist this observation from multiple angles is very important.

- Girl's head:

In this work, Đukin demonstrates a comprehensive understanding of Cubism, though his approach is not considered radically innovative. The influence of the post-World War I period is evident, particularly the return to order movement. The artist employs a somewhat aggressive treatment of form, notably in the deepening and bulging of the cheek. Additionally, Đukin incorporates graphic stylization, introducing a linear depiction of hair that evokes the Art Deco aesthetic.
