= Aco Petrović (politician) =

Serbian politician

Aco Petrović (Serbian Cyrillic: Ацо Петровић; born 13 August 1958) is a politician in Serbia. He was a member of Belgrade's city council from 2012 until 2018, when he was appointed as one of the city's three assistant mayors. Since 2020, he has served in the National Assembly of Serbia. Petrović is a member of the Party of United Pensioners of Serbia (PUPS).

== Private career ==
Petrović was born in the village of Mrčajevci in Čačak, in what was then the People's Republic of Serbia in the Federal People's Republic of Yugoslavia. He was raised in Belgrade, where he still resides. He is a civil technician in private life; he worked for ten years at Mostogradnja as a site manager and was a private entrepreneur for twenty years.

== Politician ==
=== City politics ===
Petrović joined the PUPS in 2006. The party contested the 2012 Belgrade city and municipal elections in an alliance led by the Socialist Party of Serbia. Petrović appeared in the second position on the Socialist-led electoral list in the New Belgrade municipality and was elected to its assembly when the list won seven mandates.

In the city of Belgrade as a whole, the Democratic Party and its allies emerged victorious from the 2012 local elections and formed a new coalition government with the Socialist Party of Serbia. As part of the Socialist alliance, the PUPS participated in the government. On 13 June 2012, Petrović was appointed to the Belgrade city council (i.e., the executive branch of the city government) as a representative of his party. By virtue of holding an executive position, he was required to resign from the New Belgrade municipal assembly, which he did on 27 June 2012.

The DS lost its majority in the Belgrade city assembly in late 2013, and a new election was called for early 2014. The Serbian Progressive Party and its allies won a majority of seats and subsequently formed a new government with the Socialists and the Democratic Party of Serbia. Petrović was not a candidate in this election, but, as the PUPS remained a part of the governing coalition, he was appointed to a new term on council on 24 April 2014.

The PUPS subsequently shifted its alliance from the Progressives to the Socialists, which did not affect its position in Belgrade's governing coalition. Petrović ran for re-election to the New Belgrade municipal assembly in the 2016 Serbian local elections, appearing in the tenth position on the Progressive-led list, and was elected when the list won seventeen mandates. While the Progressives won most municipal elections across Serbia in 2016, they finished second in New Belgrade to a list led by Aleksandar Šapić. Petrović chose to remain a member of city council and resigned from the municipal assembly again on 24 August 2016.

Petrović appeared in the twenty-sixth position on the Progressive Party's coalition list in the 2018 Belgrade City Assembly election and was elected when the list won a majority victory with sixty-four out of 110 mandates. He both resigned from the city assembly and saw his term on city council expire on 7 June 2018. Shortly thereafter, he was assigned as one of the city's three assistant mayors, along with Andreja Mladenović and Aleksandar Marković.

He was elected as a vice-president of the PUPS in late 2018.

=== Parliamentarian ===
Petrović appeared in the 228th position (out of 250) on the Progressive Party's Aleksandar Vučić — For Our Children list in the 2020 Serbian parliamentary election. This was too low a position for direct election to be a realistic possibility, and indeed he was not elected even as the list won a landslide majority with 188 out mandates. He was, however, awarded a mandate on 28 October 2020 as the replacement for PUPS leader Milan Krkobabić, who had been re-appointed to a cabinet position in the Serbian government; as the next PUPS candidate on the list who had not already won a mandate, Petrović was eligible for the seat. He is a member of Serbia's parliamentary friendship groups with Australia and Greece.
