= Vesna Tomić =

Serbian politician (born 1974)

Vesna Tomić (Serbian Cyrillic: Весна Томић; born 5 November 1974) is a politician and administrator in Serbia. She has served in the Assembly of Vojvodina since 2020 as a member of the Serbian Progressive Party.

== Private career ==
Tomić was born in Sombor, Vojvodina, in what was then the Socialist Republic of Serbia in the Socialist Federal Republic of Yugoslavia. She attended the University of Novi Sad and earned a master's degree in engineering management from the Faculty of Technical Sciences. She has been a department co-ordinator for Telekom Srbija. Tomić was appointed to the supervisory board of the public utility company Energana in Sombor on 13 April 2017 and subsequently served as its president.

== Politician ==
=== Municipal politics ===
Tomić received the fourth position on the Progressive Party's electoral list for Sombor in the 2020 Serbian local elections and was elected when the list won a majority victory with thirty-nine out of sixty-one mandates. She resigned her mandate in the city assembly on 11 September 2020.

=== Assembly of Vojvodina ===
Tomić was given the fifty-ninth position on the Progressive-led Aleksandar Vučić — For Our Children list in the 2020 Vojvodina provincial election, which was held concurrently with the local elections, and was elected when the list won a majority victory with seventy-six out of 120 mandates. She is now a member of the committee on national equality and the committee on European integration and inter-regional co-operation.
