= Khương Thị Hồng Nhung =

Vietnamese chess player (born 1972)

Personal information
- Born: 2 January 1972 (age 54)

Chess career
- Country: Vietnam
- Title: Woman International Master (1994)
- FIDE rating: 1964 (December 2022)
- Peak rating: 2125 (January 2000)

Khương Thị Hồng Nhung (born 2 January 1972) is a Vietnamese chess player who holds the title of Woman International Master. She was the first Vietnamese female chess player to progress internationally to the Interzonal level.

== Biography ==
In 1991, Khương Thị Hồng Nhung participated in Women's World Chess Championship Interzonal Tournament in Subotica where ranked 33rd place.

In 1994, she was awarded the FIDE Woman International Master (WIM) title.
