= Gordana Marković =

Serbian chess player (born 1951)

Personal information
- Born: 4 January 1951 (age 75) Belgrade, PR Serbia, FPR Yugoslavia

Chess career
- Country: Yugoslavia → Serbia
- Title: Woman International Master (1979)
- FIDE rating: 2257 [inactive]
- Peak rating: 2335 (July 1987)
- Peak ranking: No. 20 woman (January 1977)
Medal record
Women's chess
Representing Yugoslavia
Chess Olympiad
Bronze medal – third place	1988 Thessaloniki	Women's team

Gordana Marković (née Jovanović; born 4 January 1951), also known as Gordana Marković-Jovanović, (Serbian Cyrillic: Гордана Марковић-Јовановић) is a Serbian chess player who holds the title of Woman International Master (WIM, 1979). She is a two-time winner of the Yugoslav Women's Chess Championship (1977, 1981) and won a team bronze medal with the Yugoslav women's team at the 1988 Chess Olympiad.

== Biography ==
From the late 1970s to the early 1990s, she was one of the leading Yugoslav women's chess players. Gordana Marković twice won the Yugoslav Women's Chess Championship, in 1977 and 1981.

Gordana Marković participated in three Women's World Chess Championship Interzonal Tournaments:

- In 1979, at Interzonal Tournament in Alicante shared 13th-14th place;
- In 1987, at Interzonal Tournament in Smederevska Palanka finished in 13th place;
- In 1991, at Interzonal Tournament in Subotica finished in 22nd place.

Gordana Marković played for Yugoslavia in six Women's Chess Olympiads (including "B" team in 1990):

- In 1978, at first board in the 8th Chess Olympiad (women) in Buenos Aires (+3, =8, -2),
- In 1980, at first board in the 9th Chess Olympiad (women) in Valletta (+4, =4, -5),
- In 1984, at first reserve board in the 26th Chess Olympiad (women) in Thessaloniki (+5, =3, -1),
- In 1986, at first board in the 27th Chess Olympiad (women) in Dubai (+1, =2, -4),
- In 1988, at second board in the 28th Chess Olympiad (women) in Thessaloniki (+5, =2, -2) and won the team bronze medal,
- In 1990, at third board in the 29th Chess Olympiad (women) in Novi Sad (+6, =1, -3).

In 1979, Gordana Marković was awarded the FIDE Woman International Master (WIM) title. Since 2000, she rarely participates in chess tournaments. Her sister Katarina Blagojević was a chess Woman International master.

Her highest ranking on the FIDE women's rating list was No. 20 in January 1977, while her highest Elo rating was 2335 in July 1987.

She won team bronze medals with ŠK BAS Belgrade in European Women's Chess Club Cup in 1998 and 2000, both times playing on board 4. She was registered as a reserve when the team won the tournament in 2002, but didn't play in any match.
