= Ivan Jovanović (footballer, born 1990) =

Serbian footballer

Personal information
- Full name: Ivan Jovanović
- Date of birth: 28 February 1990 (age 36)
- Place of birth: Požarevac, SFR Yugoslavia
- Height: 1.70 m (5 ft 7 in)
- Position: Midfielder

Youth career
- Partizan

Senior career*
| Years | Team | Apps | (Gls) |
| 2008–2010 | Teleoptik | 32 | (3) |
| 2011 | Jagodina | 2 | (0) |
| 2011 | Mladi Radnik Požarevac | 3 | (0) |
| 2012 | Radnički Sombor | 6 | (1) |
| 2012–2013 | Železnik Lavovi | 25 | (13) |
| 2013–2014 | Dolina Padina | 23 | (0) |
| 2014 | IMT | | |
| 2015 | Brodarac | | |
| 2015 | Jedinstvo Užice | | |
| 2016–2017 | Radnički Beograd | | |
- * Club domestic league appearances and goals as of 22 June 2014

Ivan Jovanović (Serbian Cyrillic: Иван Јовановић; born 28 February 1990) is a Serbian retired football midfielder.
