= Photographic Studio of Milan Jovanović =

Coordinates: 44.8114°N 20.4617°E

- Фотографски атеље Милана Јовановића/Fotografski atelje Milana Jovanovića
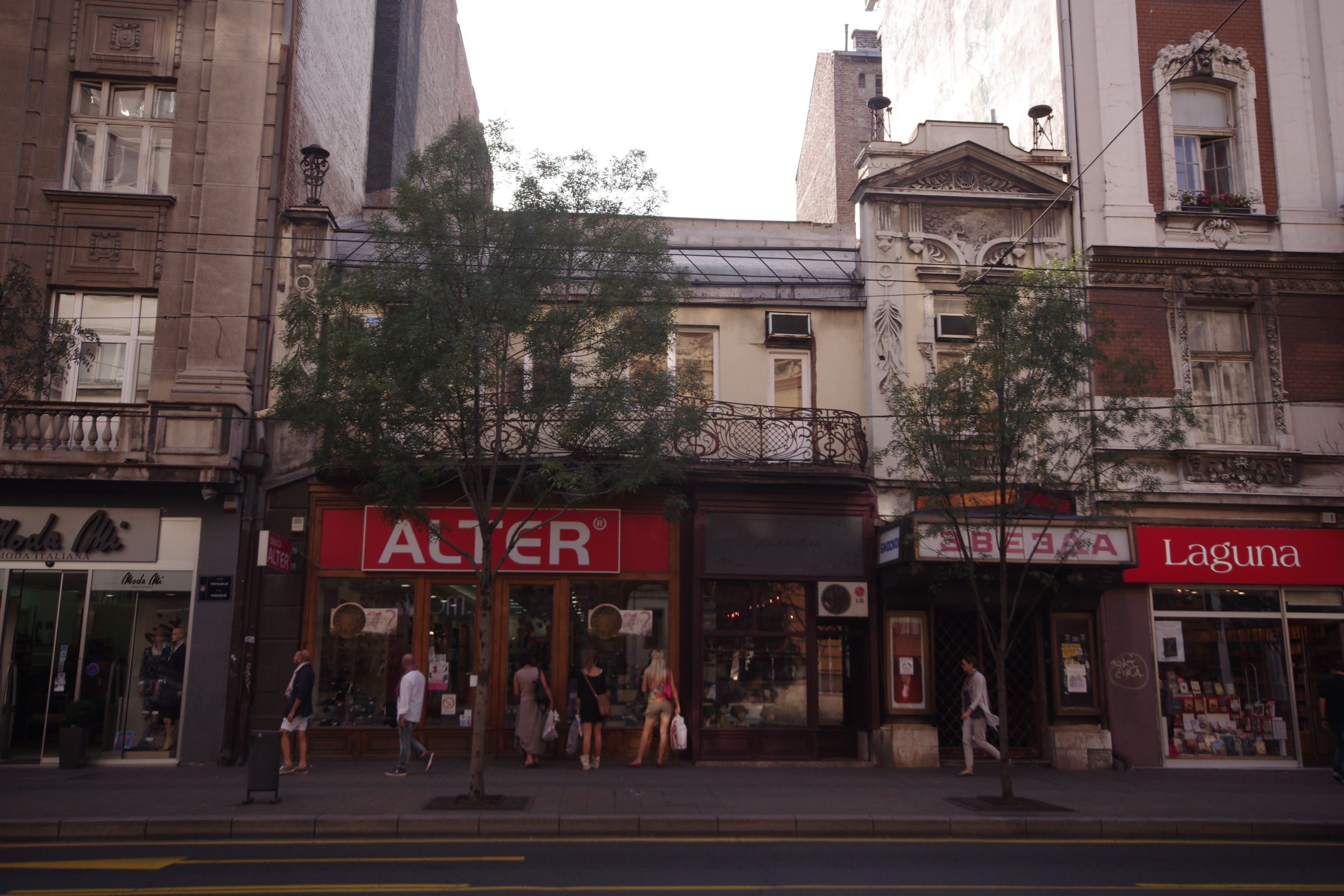
- Photographic Studio of Milan Jovanović
- Interactive map of Photographic Studio of Milan Jovanović
- Location: Belgrade
- Type: Monument
- Completion date: 1903
- Website: Beogradsko nasledje

The photographic studio of Milan Jovanović was constructed in 1903 as the first and so far the only structure built for the purpose of taking and developing photographs.

== Life ==
Its owner, Milan Jovanović, the court photographer was born in 1863 in Vršac. His father Stevan was a renowned local photographer. As the one who continued the tradition, by the end of the 1870s he sets off for Vienna to study photography. Apart from the photography, probably under the influence of his brother Paja Jovanović, who studied painting at that time, he also attended painting classes as well. After graduating, he improved his education in Paris, Мunich and Тrieste and then, In the eighties, he came to Belgrade and opened a studio in Кnez Mihailova Street. He was granted the citizenship of Serbia in 1894, and soon afterwards was given the post of the court photographer. The year of the construction coincides with the most important period of the career of Milan Jovanović. The artistic and technical quality that he achieved at that time could be compared to the works of the most important photographs of that time.

== Studio construction ==
The need to attract respectable clients as well as the status that he had were the reasons that Milan Jovanović, in 1901, purchased a lot in the immediate distance to the property of Đorđe Simić, Serbian envoy in Vienna, and to hire an architect Milan Antonović to design the building for the studio. Although there were very few role models for the structure of that kind, the architect skillfully adjusted the studio demands by constructing a partially glass roof thus enabling the presence of the necessary light, with the demands of newly formed merchant bazaar by opening a store in the ground floor.

The facade in the form of Art Nouveau suited the requirements of that time, with the decorative metal elements and architectural ornaments in terracotta. The dominant motifs of the photographic studio building is the decoration of the side, projecting the putti with a camera, the first-floor balcony railing and the representative entrance gate.

The photographic studio upstairs provided all the necessary conditions for pursuing the metier of photography, since its glass roof admitted the sufficient amount of the daylight, without which the photography was unimaginable at the time. A large, well equipped studio allowed staging scenes with a large number of participants, and the enlargement of the portraits to life size.

== 1930s ==
The studio stopped working in the 1930s, and its premises were taken under lease by the lessee of the fashion lounge on the ground floor. In previous years, during the adaptation of the other business premise for the purposes of the modern Automatic buffet, "the modernization" of the facade was done in a way that the portal was changed and "too decorative "first-floor balcony was covered with the tin coating.

== Nationalization ==
After the Second World War the building was nationalized, the first floor was assigned to the "Belgrade film", to serve as their business premises, whereas the restaurant and the Fashion salon Ercegovac remained on the ground floor. When exactly the building was given its present-day appearance, i.e. when its glass roof was replaced with a metal one, and its glazed front with a bricked wall, is not known. It could have taken place either in 1941, when the cinema auditorium was damaged in the air attack on Belgrade, or after Belgrade film moved in.

== Cinema ==
Associated with the building of the photographic studio is the Coliseum Cinema built in 1911 in the rear of the courtyard by the industrialist Šonda, as a temporary structure. Its original appearance is unknown, but from the testimonies of contemporaries its interior is known to have been fashioned in the Art Nouveau style. In the meanwhile, the cinema expanded and partitioned, seized from and returned to the owners, renamed, yet it maintained its use as the cinema all along. Both the photographic studio and the Zvezda cinema have fallen into disuse. Undeservedly neglected, degraded through the change of ownership, they are left to decay instead of being appreciated as a valuable rarity.

== Cultural heritage property ==
The photographic studio of Milan Jovanović was designated as a cultural heritage property in 1992, since it is the only purpose built structure of that kind, it is attached to the name of Milan Jovanović, a photograph who defined the development of , also, it was designed by Milan Antonović (1868–1929)a prominent figure in the history of Belgrade's architecture and it is an important piece of Art Nouveau architecture. ("The Official Gazette of the City of Belgrade" 26/92).
