= Sanja Vuksanović =

Serbian chess player (born 1967)

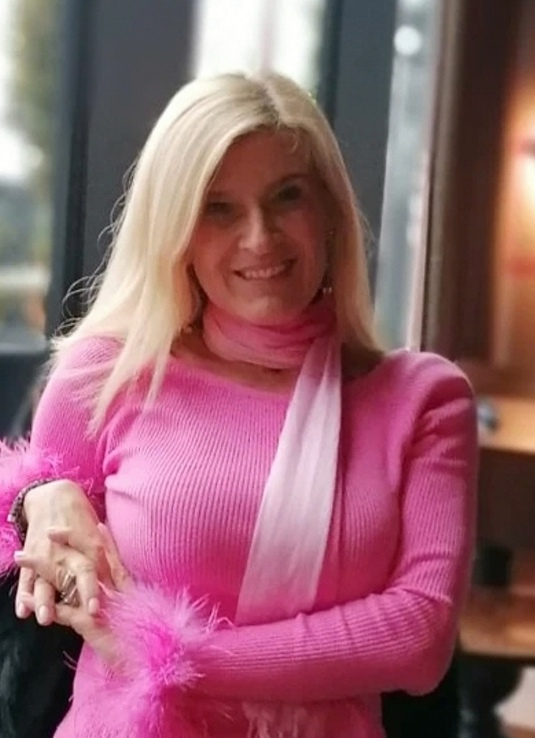

Personal information
- Born: 3 April 1967 (age 59) Yugoslavia

Chess career
- Country: Yugoslavia → Serbia
- Title: Woman Grandmaster (1998)
- FIDE rating: 2160 (January 2017)
- Peak rating: 2365 (July 1998)
- Peak ranking: No. 51 woman (July 1998)

Sanja Vuksanović (Serbian Cyrillic: Сања Вуксановић; born 3 April 1967) is a Serbian chess player. She earned the FIDE title of Woman Grandmaster (WGM) in 1998. She won FR Yugoslavia Women's Chess Championship in 1992. In July 1998, she reached FIDE Top 50 Women ranking list.

== Biography ==
In the 1990s, Vuksanović was one of the leading female chess players in Serbia. In 1991, she shared first place in Women's World Chess Championship Zonal Tournament and won the right to take part in an Interzonal Tournament. In 1991, Vuksanović participated in Women's World Chess Championship Interzonal Tournament in Subotica where she was tied 16th-21st. In 1992, she won FR Yugoslavia Women's Chess Championship.

Sanja Vuksanović played for FR Yugoslavia in the Women's Chess Olympiads:

- In 1996, at third board in the 32nd Chess Olympiad (women) in Yerevan (+4, =0, -4),
- In 1998, at first reserve board in the 33rd Chess Olympiad (women) in Elista (+1, =1, -2).

In 1992, she was awarded the FIDE Woman International Master (WIM) title and received the FIDE Woman Grandmaster (WGM) title in 1998.

In July 1998, she reached FIDE Top 50 Women list when she was ranked tied 50th−53rd (51st on additional criteria).
