= Vida Yovanovich =

Mexican photographer

- Born: 9 October 1949 (age 76); Havana, Cuba
- Education: Universidad de las Américas, A.C.
- Occupation: Painter
- Awards: Guggenheim Fellow (2000)

Vida Yovanovich (born 9 October 1949) is a Mexican photographer. Born in Cuba to war refugees from Yugoslavia, she moved to Mexico as a young child and obtained her Bachelor of Fine Arts degree at the Universidad de las Américas, A.C. A 2000 Guggenheim Fellow, she has held individual exhibitions not only in her native Mexico and Cuba, but also in the United States, Europe, and South Africa, and she is also known for her exhibition "La Cárcel de los Sueños".

== Biography ==
Vida Yovanovich was born on 9 October 1949 in Havana, Cuba, where her parents fled from their native Yugoslavia due to war, and she moved to Mexico City in 1956. She obtained her Bachelor of Fine Arts degree at the Universidad de las Américas, A.C. in 1978.

She has held individual exhibitions not only in her native Mexico and Cuba, but also in the United States, Europe, and South Africa. Among collections storing her works are those of the Ateneo Español de México, the Casa de las Américas in Cuba, the Museum of Fine Arts, Houston, the Museo Nacional de Bellas Artes in Argentina, and the Museum of Applied Arts, Belgrade. She was part of "NaFoto", a group exhibition at the 1997 São Paulo Art Biennial.

Her work is generally characterized by being focused on the life and identity of women; her style of photography has been described by the ITESO, Universidad Jesuita de Guadalajara as "reflective and intimate." One of her exhibitions, "La Cárcel de los Sueños", was described by Milenio as "one of her most recognized works", and was inspired by her personal experience in an asylum and by the work of Graciela Iturbide and Duane Michals. A companion book for the exhibition was completed in 1997 with an introduction by Elena Poniatowska.

In 1994, she worked as an artist-in-residence at the Nexus Contemporary Art Center. She has also taught as a lecturer at institutions like the National Autonomous University of Mexico and the University of Barcelona.

She was a Fellow of the Instituto Nacional de Bellas Artes y Literatura in 1983 and a National Endowment for the Arts Fellow in 1994. She was named a Guggenheim Fellow in 2000. She won the Instituto Nacional de Antropología e Historia's 2022 Medal of Photographic Merit. She is also a member of the Sistema Nacional de Creadores de Arte.

She considers herself to be a "Mexican by adoption".
