= Petar Palaviccini =

Croatian sculptor

Petar Palaviccini or Palavicini (Croatian: Petar Palavićini; 15 June 1887 — 22 October 1958) was a Croatian sculptor of Italian ancestry. He spent most of his artistic career in Belgrade, Serbia.

== Biography ==
Palaviccini was born on 15 June 1887 in Korčula, Austria-Hungary. He studied stonemasonry in his native Korčula, and sculpture at the School of Sculpture and Stone Carving in Hořice in Bohemia from 1905 to 1909. He studied at the Academy of Fine Arts in Prague from 1909 to 1912 with art Professor Myslbek. Afterwards, he graduated in sculpture in Vienna. World War I found him in the Czech Republic. He had his first solo exhibition in Prague in 1919. In 1921, he came to Belgrade. His house became a meeting place for intellectual and artistic circles in Belgrade. He was a professor at the Art School in Belgrade from 1924 to 1937. He is one of the founders of the Art Group Oblik. He also participated in a large number of group exhibitions in the Kingdom of Yugoslavia at the time, namely Split, Osijek, Zagreb, Ljubljana, Belgrade, Novi Sad) and in Europe (Barcelona, Sofia, Plovdiv, Prague, London, Paris, Rome, Moscow, Leningrad, Bratislava, Warsaw, Kraków, Budapest).

He was originally inspired by the skill of the great stone-cutters in the quarries on his native island of Korčula before leaving for his art studies at the Academy of Fine Arts in Prague.

There he became informed about the prevailing trends in world sculpture, and when he graduated he settled in Belgrade, where he was commissioned to create numerous portraits and figurines for the newly-constructed municipal buildings then being developed in the capital. In 1926 he built his home and atelier in Belgrade. His work is representative of the classical tradition yet combined with a modern cubist style for figurines for which he is famous. His works are found throughout the country, though some were damaged during the NATO bombing of Yugoslavia in 1999.

He died on 22 October 1958 Dubrovnik, Yugoslavia, at the age of 71.

== Art ==
In the early phase, he was influenced by the national romanticism of Ivan Meštrović. Around 1922, his recognizable expression was created, which is one of the most original and modern in Yugoslav sculpture between the two world wars, which he called "spiritualized cubism. The main stylistic feature was a simplified form, almost reduced to a voluminous drawing, which he showed in a series of portraits created during the third decade. In the cycle of statuettes he performed in the 1930s, he expressed himself with a pronounced expression of "Gothic" verticals. These features marked his entire later opus.

The most famous works of Palaviccini are: Portrait of Rastko Petrović, 1922; Gothic statuette, 1926; Don Quixote, 1927; Girl with a bowl, 1932; Girl combing her hair, 1933; Spring (First flower), 1939; For the bluebird, 1939.

== Solo exhibitions ==
- Prague 1917, 1921
- Zagreb 1920
- Belgrade 1921, 1923, 1929, 1952 (retrospective exhibition), 1969 Petar Palaviccini and his students
- Split 1925

== Awards and decorations ==
- 1925 Order of Saint Sava, Belgrade
