= Boris Jovanović =

Serbian footballer (born 1972)

Personal information
- Date of birth: 23 July 1972 (age 54)
- Place of birth: SFR Yugoslavia
- Height: 1.91 m (6 ft 3 in)
- Position: Goalkeeper

Senior career*
Years	Team	Apps	(Gls)
1994–1995	SpVgg Unterhaching	5	(0)
1995–1997	SSV Reutlingen	46	(0)
1997–1998	VfB Leipzig	27	(0)
1999	Dynamo Dresden	9	(0)
2000–2002	SC Borea Dresden	57	(0)
2003	Borussia Fulda	15	(0)
2004	Carl Zeiss Jena	15	(0)
2005–2006	1. FC Gera 03	7	(0)
2007–2009	Sachsen Leipzig	3	(0)
2007–2009	Sachsen Leipzig II	23	(0)
2009–2010	VfB 09 Pößneck		
- * Club domestic league appearances and goals

Boris Jovanović (Serbian Cyrillic: Борис Јовановић; born 23 July 1972) is a Serbian former professional footballer who played as a goalkeeper. He spent the majority of his footballing career in Germany.
