= Beatriz Marinello =

American chess player (born 1964)

Personal information
- Born: May 14, 1964 (age 62) Chile

Chess career
- Country: United States
- Title: Woman International Master (1991)
- Peak rating: 2230 (January 1997)

Beatriz Mansilla Marinello (born May 14, 1964) is a Chilean-American chess player and chess official. She was a vice president of FIDE from 2010 to 2018. Marinello was previously president of the United States Chess Federation (USCF) from 2003 to 2005 and a member of the executive board from 2003 to 2007. She was elected general secretary of the Association of Chess Professionals in 2019.

== Career ==
Marinello started playing chess at the age of 13 and became national women's champion of Chile when she was 16 years old. In 1980, she was awarded the title Woman International Master (WIM) by FIDE. She organized her first national championship in Chile at the age of 20 years, and later organized other international competitions.

Marinello arrived in the United States from Chile in 1990, and became a chess teacher in Miami. She represented the US in two Women's Interzonal Tournaments: in 1991 in Subotica and in 1993 in Jakarta. She also represented the United States in the 1994 Women's Chess Olympiad held in Moscow.
