= Aleksandar Jovanović (journalist) =

Serbian politician, journalist, editor, and TV personality

Aleksandar Jovanović (Serbian Cyrillic: Александар Јовановић; born 12 February 1968) is a journalist, editor, television personality, and politician in Serbia. He has served in the National Assembly of Serbia since 2020 as a member of the Party of United Pensioners of Serbia (PUPS).

== Private life and media career ==
Jovanović lives in Belgrade. He has served at different times as editor-in-chief and creative director of telegraf.rs, a tabloid news portal. He has also appeared on the reality television programs Veliki brat (Big Brother; 2007) and Farma (The Farm; 2009). In 2013, he attracted unfavourable media coverage for hitting KK Partizan coach Duško Vujošević with a basketball during a game against KK Crvena zvezda.

== Politician ==
The PUPS contested the 2020 Serbian parliamentary election in an alliance with the Serbian Progressive Party. Jovanović received the 117th position on the Progressive Party's Aleksandar Vučić — For Our Children coalition list and was elected when the list won a landslide majority with 188 mandates. He is now a member of the committee on human and minority rights and gender equality, a deputy member of the culture and information committee, the environmental protection committee, and the committee on the diaspora and Serbs in the region, and a member of Serbia's parliamentary friendship groups with China, Egypt, Israel, Italy, the Netherlands, Portugal, Slovenia, Turkey, the United Arab Emirates, and the United States of America.
