= Tünde Csonkics =

Hungarian chess player

Personal information
- Born: 20 September 1958 (age 67)

Chess career
- Country: Hungary
- Title: Woman Grandmaster (1990)
- FIDE rating: 2036 (September 2020)
- Peak rating: 2370 (January 1990)

Tünde Csonkics (born 20 September 1958) is a Hungarian chess player who received the FIDE title of Woman Grandmaster (WGM) in 1990. She is a Hungarian Women's Chess Champion (1981).

== Biography ==
In 1979, Tünde Csonkics won the International Women Chess Tournament in Nałęczów. In 1981, she shared the third place in the International Women Chess Tournament in Novi Sad. In 1991, Tünde Csonkics participated in the Women's World Chess Interzonal Tournament in Subotica, where she took 19th place. She has participated many times in the Hungarian Women's Chess Championship where she won gold (1981) and silver (1995) medals.

Tünde Csonkics played for Hungary in the Women's Chess Olympiads:

- In 1980, at first reserve board in the 9th Chess Olympiad (women) in Valletta (+3, =0, -1) and won team silver medal
- In 1982, at first reserve board in the 10th Chess Olympiad (women) in Lucerne (+0, =2, -2) and won team bronze medal
- In 1992, at second board in the 30th Chess Olympiad (women) in Manila (+5, =5, -3)
- In 1994, at first reserve board in the 31st Chess Olympiad (women) in Moscow (+0, =0, -2) and won team silver medal

In 1990, she was awarded the FIDE Woman Grandmaster (WGM) title. Tünde Csonkics is also an FIDE International Arbiter (1992). Since 2002 she has rarely played in chess tournaments.
