= Aleksandar Jovanović (footballer, born July 1992) =

Serbian football

Personal information
- Date of birth: 25 July 1992 (age 34)
- Place of birth: Zaječar, SFR Yugoslavia
- Height: 1.86 m (6 ft 1 in)
- Position: Goalkeeper

Team information
- Current team: Timok
- Number: 1

Youth career
- Timok

Senior career*
Years	Team	Apps	(Gls)
2011–2015	Timok	70	(0)
2016	Guria Lanchkhuti	7	(0)
2017	Olimpik Sarajevo	1	(0)
2018	Rudar Kakanj	12	(0)
2018	Rtanj Boljevac	0	(0)
2019–2020	Dinamo Vranje	0	(0)
2019–2020	→ Budućnost Popovac (loan)	17	(0)
2020–	Timok	12	(0)
2022	→ Dunav Prahovo (loan)		
- * Club domestic league appearances and goals as of 10 November 2021

Aleksandar Jovanović (Serbian Cyrillic: Александар Јовановић; born 25 July 1992) is a Serbian football goalkeeper who plays for Timok.
