= Nataša Jovanović (Serbian politician, born 1967) =

Serbian politician

Nataša Jovanović (Serbian Cyrillic: Наташа Јовановић; born 16 October 1967) is a politician in Serbia. She has been a member of the National Assembly of Serbia since 2016 as a member of the Serbian Progressive Party.

== Early life and career ==
Jovanović was raised in the Mladenovac municipality in Belgrade, then part of the Socialist Republic of Serbia in the Socialist Federal Republic of Yugoslavia. She has a master's degree from the University of Belgrade Faculty of Economics and taught at the Economic and Commerce School in Sopot, Poland, from 1991 to 2000. She then returned to Mladenovac, where she worked as director of a branch office of the KBM bank from 2002 to 2015.

== Politician ==
Jovanović was appointed to serve on a provisional authority in Mladenovac in 2015 when the municipal assembly was dissolved amid corruption charges.

She received the 129th position on the Progressive Party's Aleksandar Vučić – Serbia Is Winning electoral list in the 2016 Serbian parliamentary election and was elected when the list won a majority victory with 131 out of 250 mandates. During the 2016–20 parliament, she was a member of the assembly committee on education, science, technological development, and the information society; a deputy member of the committee on human and minority rights and gender equality and the committee on the economy, regional development, trade, tourism, and energy; and a member the parliamentary friendship groups with Algeria, Argentina, Belarus, Bosnia and Herzegovina, China, Cuba, Georgia, Greece, Indonesia, Italy, Japan, Luxembourg, Mexico, Russia, Slovenia, Spain, Tunisia, Turkey, Uganda, and the countries of Sub-Saharan Africa.

Jovanović was promoted to the seventy-first position on the Progressive Party's Aleksandar Vučić — For Our Children list in the 2020 Serbian parliamentary election and was elected to a second term in the assembly when the list won a landslide majority with 188 mandates. She remains a member of the education committee, and she is a deputy member of the foreign affairs committee and the committee on spatial planning, transport, infrastructure, and telecommunications; a member of the subcommittee on youth and sports; a substitute member of the Serbia's delegation to the parliamentary dimension of the Central European Initiative; the head of Serbia's parliamentary friendship group with Peru; and a member of the parliamentary friendship groups with Austria, Bosnia and Herzegovina, Canada, China, Cuba, Cyprus, Egypt, Finland, France, Georgia, India, Indonesia, Italy, Japan, Kazakhstan, Malta, Morocco, Norway, Portugal, Russia, Slovakia, Spain, Sweden, Switzerland, Turkey, the United Arab Emirates
