= Lovina Sylvia Chidi =

Nigerian chess player

Personal information
- Born: 1971 (age 54–55) Germany

Chess career
- Country: Germany; Nigeria
- Peak rating: 1832 (January 2010)

Lovina Sylvia Chidi (born 1971) is a German-born chess player.

== Biography ==
Lovina Sylvia Chidi was born in Germany, spent her childhood in Nigeria, and later studied in England where she worked in information technology. She is a self-published poet and author. In the first half of the 1990s, she was one of the leading Nigerian female chess players. In 1991, she participated in the Women's World Chess Championship Interzonal Tournament in Subotica, finishing last of the 35 players after missing the first two rounds.

Lovina Sylvia Chidi played for Nigeria in the Women's Chess Olympiads:

- In 1990, at third board in the 29th Chess Olympiad (women) in Novi Sad (+5, =3, -5),
- In 1992, at second board in the 30th Chess Olympiad (women) in Manila (+4, =2, -2).
