= Milenković family =

Serbian family honored as Righteous Among the Nations

Milenković family refers to a group of three people: Svetozar Milenković (1907–1983), Vida Milenković (1912–1992), and Aleksandar Petrović (1917–1944). They are honoured as Righteous Among the Nations for saving Jews from the Nazis in Serbia during World War II.

Svetozar was a Serbian Orthodox priest, and the son of a priest. Vida, his wife (née Petrović), was the daughter of Mihailo Petrović, who had been a Chetnik freedom fighter against the Ottomans. Aleksandar, her brother, was a student.

In 1941, the Nazis occupied Belgrade and began rounding up Jews. The Fenje family (the father who had the title of Doctor, the mother, and their two daughters) fled to Raška to escape persecution; but the Nazis began to "cleanse" that town also of Jews. Many who had been friends or neighbours offered the Fenjes no help, but Svetosar and Vida did. They sheltered them in their own home and arranged hiding places for the father and one daughter in nearby villages. Aleksandar arranged similar hiding places for the mother and the other daughter. The area was dangerous: Chetniks of Dragoljub Mihailović and Yugoslav Partisans were fighting the Germans, who were searching for and arresting everyone they considered undesirable. The Fenjes wore peasants' clothing, moved from place to place, and survived the war.

Aleksandar was less fortunate. He was captured by the Nazis, and sent to Mauthausen concentration camp. On 29 June 1944, he was gassed at nearby Hartheim.

On 24 October 2002, Yad Vashem recognised Svetozar and Vida Milenković and Aleksandar Petrović as Righteous Among the Nations.
