= Vesna Jovanovic =

American artist (born 1976)

- Born: 1976 (age 49–50); Chicago, Illinois

Vesna Jovanovic (born 1976 in Chicago, Illinois) is a contemporary American visual artist, best known for her works on paper that address themes related to the human body.

Jovanovic was a long-term Artist in Residence at the International Museum of Surgical Science in Chicago, from 2013 to 2015. Her artwork has been exhibited at various museums and galleries, including solo exhibitions at the University of Chicago Gordon Center for Integrative Science, Packer Schopf Gallery, Greymatter Gallery, Metro Gallery at Reno City Hall, Delaware Contemporary, Ralph Arnold Gallery at Loyola University Chicago, and International Museum of Surgical Science, among numerous other venues. Her artwork has been featured in Newcity, Time Out Chicago, Science News, Discover Magazine blog Bad Astronomy, Seed Magazine, and various other publications. She has been awarded several grants from the Illinois Arts Council and the City of Chicago, as well as artist residency awards from the Santa Fe Art Institute, Chanorth, Virginia Center for the Creative Arts and VCCA France, among others.

She currently lives and works in Chicago.
