= Constanze Jahn =

German chess player

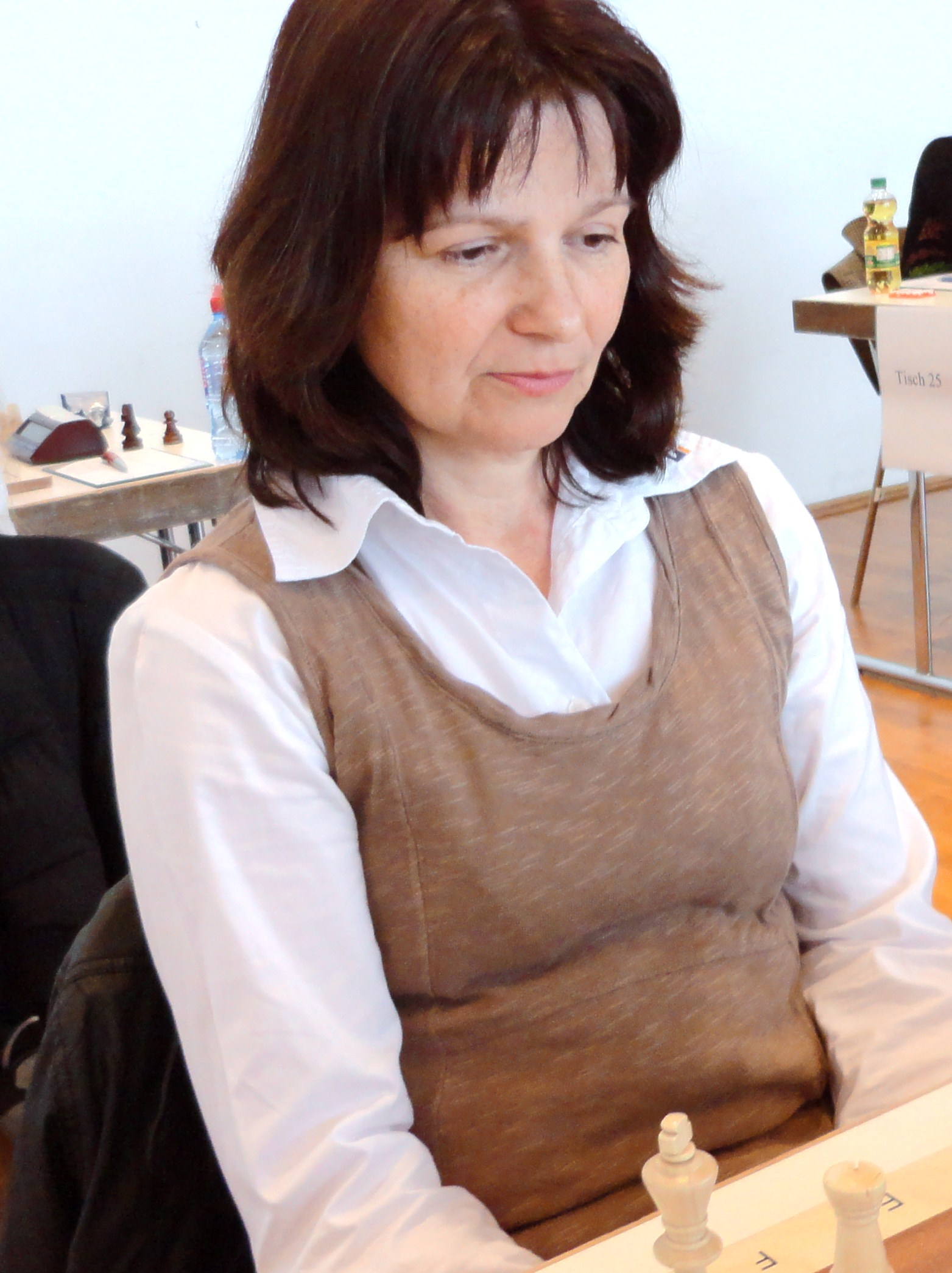
- Jahn in 2012

Personal information
- Born: 12 January 1963 (age 63)

Chess career
- Country: East Germany; Germany
- Title: Woman International Master (1991)
- Peak rating: 2254 (July 2001)

Constanze Jahn (born 12 January 1963) is a German chess Woman International Master (WIM) (1991).

== Biography ==
At the 1990s Constanze Jahn was one of the leading female chess players in East Germany. In 1991, in Graz she shared first place with Tatjana Lematschko in Women's World Chess Championship Zonal Tournament and won the right to take part in an Interzonal Tournament. In 1991, Jahn participated in Women's World Chess Championship Interzonal Tournament in Subotica where ranked 28th place. Jahn twice won German Women's Fast Chess Championships: in 1998 and in 2005. In 2001, she won the bronze medal in this tournament. In 1991, she was second in the German Women's Blitz Chess Championship.

Jahn played for Germany in the Women's Chess Olympiad:

- In 1992, at first reserve board in the 30th Chess Olympiad (women) in Manila (+3, =4, -3).

She played for Germany in the European Team Chess Championship:

- In 1992, at first reserve board in the 1st European Team Chess Championship (women) in Debrecen (+3, =1, -2).

In 1991, Jahn was awarded the FIDE Woman International Master (WIM) title.
