= Mirjana Marić =

Serbian chess player (born 1970)

Personal information
- Born: January 10, 1970 (age 56) New York City, New York, U.S.

Chess career
- Country: Yugoslavia → Serbia
- Title: Woman Grandmaster (1992)
- FIDE rating: 2263 (November 2012)
- Peak rating: 2333 (July 2000)

Mirjana Marić (Serbian Cyrillic: Мирјана Марић; born January 10, 1970) is an American-born Serbian chess player who holds the FIDE title of Woman Grandmaster (WGM). She lives in Belgrade, capital of Serbia (former Yugoslavia), and has a dual Serbian and US citizenship.

Marić was born in New York City and introduced to chess at the age of four, together with her 20-minutes-older twin sister Alisa Marić. Alisa and Mirjana are the only twins with grandmaster titles in the history of modern chess.

At an early age, she shared 1-3 place in the World Youth Chess Championship U16 in France 1984 (bronze medal), and won the same competition in Israel in 1985.

Marić was twice Yugoslav Chess Champion, sharing first place with Suzana Maksimovic in 1991. and winning alone in 1993. She played three times for Yugoslavia on Chess Olympiads, in Novi Sad 1990 (2nd team), in Moscow 1994 and Yerevan 1996.

FIDE has awarded her with the Woman International Master (WIM) title in 1988 and with the Woman Grandmaster (WGM) title in 1992.

In the World championship cycles she played on Interzonal tournaments in Subotica 1991 and Jakarta 1993.

She graduated in mathematics at Belgrade University and married international master Zoran Stamenkovic. After 2000 Mirjana Marić has played occasionally, mainly in team events. After a long pause she played in the Serbian women's championship in Pancevo in 2007, and came fourth of 12 participants.
