= Sheila Jackson (chess player) =

English chess player (born 1957)

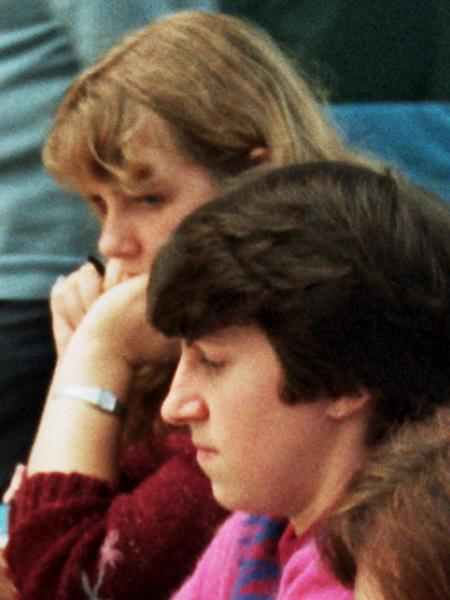
- Jackson in 1982

Personal information
- Full name: Sheila A. Jackson
- Born: 11 November 1957 (age 68)

Chess career
- Country: England
- Title: Woman Grandmaster (1988)
- FIDE rating: 2095 (April 2020)
- Peak rating: 2185 (July 2000)

Sheila A. Jackson (born 11 November 1957) is an English chess player who has held the title of Woman Grandmaster (WGM) since 1988. She is a four-time winner of the British Women's Chess Championship (1975, 1978, 1980, 1981).

== Biography ==
Jackson won the British Chess Youth Championship in 1970 in the age group U14, and in 1971 repeated this success in the age group U18. She has participated in many British Women's Chess Championships and on four occasions has won that tournament (1975, 1978, 1980, 1981), but in 1977, after the additional match, she was second.

Jackson played for England in the Women's Chess Olympiads:

- In 1974, at first reserve board in the 6th Chess Olympiad (women) in Medellín (+2, =2, -5),
- In 1976, at second board in the 7th Chess Olympiad (women) in Haifa (+5, =2, -2) and won the team silver medal,
- In 1978, at second board in the 8th Chess Olympiad (women) in Buenos Aires (+5, =3, -4),
- In 1980, at second board in the 9th Chess Olympiad (women) in Valletta (+5, =4, -3),
- In 1982, at second board in the 10th Chess Olympiad (women) in Lucerne (+7, =3, -2) and won the individual silver medal,
- In 1984, at second board in the 26th Chess Olympiad (women) in Thessaloniki (+5, =7, -2),
- In 1986, at second board in the 27th Chess Olympiad (women) in Dubai (+6, =2, -4),
- In 1988, at third board in the 28th Chess Olympiad (women) in Thessaloniki (+6, =2, -3),
- In 1990, at third board in the 29th Chess Olympiad (women) in Novi Sad (+5, =4, -3),
- In 1992, at third board in the 30th Chess Olympiad (women) in Manila (+3, =6, -2).

Jackson played for England in the European Team Chess Championships:

- In 1992, at second board in the 1st European Team Chess Championship (women) in Debrecen (+0, =3, -1).

In 1981, she was awarded the FIDE Woman International Master (WIM) title and received the FIDE Woman Grandmaster (WGM) title seven years later.

In 1991, in Subotica, Jackson participated in the Women's World Chess Championship Interzonal Tournament where she stayed at 31st place.

Since 2000, she participates in chess tournaments rarely.
