= Vesna Caselotti =

Bosnian chess player (born 1964)

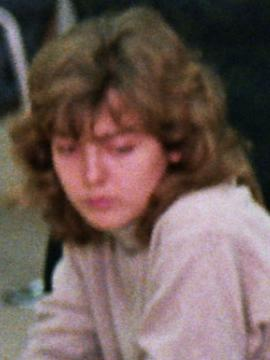
- Caselotti in 1988

Personal information
- Born: November 27, 1964 (age 61) Sarajevo, Yugoslavia

Chess career
- Country: Bosnia and Herzegovina
- Title: Woman Grandmaster (1992)
- Peak rating: 2395 (January 1997)

Vesna Caselotti, née Mišanović, (born 27 November 1964 in Sarajevo) is a Bosnian chess player who holds the FIDE title of Woman Grandmaster.

She was winner of the first ever medal for Bosnia and Herzegovina at the first Women's European Team Chess Championship in Debrecen 1992. It was an individual silver medal for best rating performance and result at first board. Before that, she won two bronze medals by playing for the Yugoslav national team at the 1988 Chess Olympiad in Thessaloniki. The medals were for overall team performance and for her individual result on fourth board. In total, she participated at six Chess Olympiads, two times for Yugoslavia (4th board in Thessaloniki 1988 and 2nd board in Novi Sad 1990) and four times for Bosnia and Herzegovina (1st board in Manila 1992, Moscow 1994, Elista 1998 and Istanbul 2000).

Her first major domestic success also occurred in 1988, when she became Yugoslav Women's Chess Champion.

In individual, international competition, she shared 7–9th places at the Kishinev Interzonal Tournament 1995.

The outbreak of the Bosnian war found her in Slovenia. After two years of struggling, she managed to return to Sarajevo as a journalist. During the Siege of Sarajevo, she managed to continue her career, using the Sarajevo Tunnel to go to tournaments and to return.

For her sport results, she was twice selected as the best sportswoman of Bosnia and Herzegovina. The readers of the women's magazines "Una" and "Zena 21" voted her an award as “Woman of the year”.
