= 1957 SFR Yugoslavia Chess Championship =

11th edition of SFR Yugoslav Chess Championship

12th SFR Yugoslavia Chess Championship
- Location: Sombor

Champion
- Svetozar Gligorić

The 1957 SFR Yugoslavia Chess Championship was the 12th edition of SFR Yugoslav Chess Championship. Held in Sombor, SFR Yugoslavia, SR Serbia, SAP Vojvodina. The tournament was won by Svetozar Gligorić.

12th SFR Yugoslavia Chess Championship
N°	Player (age)	Wins	Draws	Losses	Total points
1	(Socialist Federal Republic of Yugoslavia) Svetozar Gligorić (34)	9	13	0	15.5
2	(Socialist Federal Republic of Yugoslavia) Nikola Karaklajić (31)	7	14	1	14
3	(Socialist Federal Republic of Yugoslavia) Petar Trifunović (47)	7	14	1	14
4	(Socialist Federal Republic of Yugoslavia) Borislav Ivkov (24)	7	14	1	14
5	(Socialist Federal Republic of Yugoslavia) Milan Matulović (22)	7	13	2	13.5
6	(Socialist Federal Republic of Yugoslavia) Srećko Nedeljković (34)	7	12	3	13
7	(Socialist Federal Republic of Yugoslavia) Mijo Udovčić (37)	9	7	6	12.5
8	(Socialist Federal Republic of Yugoslavia) Sava Vuković (45)	6	12	4	12
9	(Socialist Federal Republic of Yugoslavia) Vasja Pirc (50)	4	16	2	10
10	(Socialist Federal Republic of Yugoslavia) Braslav Rabar (38)	4	13	5	10.5
11	(Socialist Federal Republic of Yugoslavia) Stojan Puc (36)	6	9	7	10.5
12	(Socialist Federal Republic of Yugoslavia) Borislav Milić (32)	3	15	4	10.5
13	(Socialist Federal Republic of Yugoslavia) Rajko Bogdanović (26)	5	11	6	10.5
14	(Socialist Federal Republic of Yugoslavia) Milan Vukcevich (20)	3	15	4	10.5
15	(Socialist Federal Republic of Yugoslavia) Bora Tot (50)	3	15	4	10.5
16	(Socialist Federal Republic of Yugoslavia) Božidar Đurašević (24)	4	12	6	10
17	(Socialist Federal Republic of Yugoslavia) Tomislav Rakić (23)	3	14	5	10
18	(Socialist Federal Republic of Yugoslavia) Dragoljub Janošević (34)	7	5	10	9.5
19	(Socialist Federal Republic of Yugoslavia) Aleksandar Bradvarević (24)	3	12	7	9
20	(Socialist Federal Republic of Yugoslavia) Vinko Cuderman (24)	1	16	5	8.5
21	(Socialist Federal Republic of Yugoslavia) Hasan Smailbegović (24)	3	11	8	8.5
22	(Socialist Federal Republic of Yugoslavia) Rudolf Marić (30)	0	14	8	7
23	(Socialist Federal Republic of Yugoslavia) Vladimir Kozomara (35)	1	11	10	6.5
