= 1948 SFR Yugoslavia Chess Championship =

4th SFR Yugoslavia Chess Championship
- Location: Belgrade

Champions
- Svetozar Gligorić and Vasja Pirc

The 1948 SFR Yugoslavia Chess Championship was the 4th edition of SFR Yugoslav Chess Championship. Held in Belgrade, SFR Yugoslavia, SR Serbia. The tournament was won by Svetozar Gligorić and Vasja Pirc.

== Table and results ==
4th SFR Yugoslavia Chess Championship
N°	Player (age)	Wins	Draws	Losses	Total points
1	(Socialist Federal Republic of Yugoslavia) IM Svetozar Gligorić (25)	11	3	3	12.5
2	(Socialist Federal Republic of Yugoslavia) GM Vasja Pirc (41)	10	5	2	12.5
3	(Socialist Federal Republic of Yugoslavia) IM Petar Trifunović (38)	7	10	0	12
4	(Socialist Federal Republic of Yugoslavia) NM Braslav Rabar (29)	6	11	0	11.5
5	(Socialist Federal Republic of Yugoslavia) NM Borislav Milić (23)	7	5	5	9.5
6	(Socialist Federal Republic of Yugoslavia) CM Srećko Nedeljković (25)	4	10	3	9
7	(Socialist Federal Republic of Yugoslavia) NM Dragutin Đaja (28)	4	10	3	9
8	(Socialist Federal Republic of Yugoslavia) NM Stojan Puc (27)	7	3	7	8.5
9	(Socialist Federal Republic of Yugoslavia) NM Borko Simonović (29)	4	9	4	8.5
10	(Socialist Federal Republic of Yugoslavia) NM Dragoljub Janošević (25)	6	4	7	8
11	(Socialist Federal Republic of Yugoslavia) NM Sava Vuković (36)	5	6	6	8
12	(Socialist Federal Republic of Yugoslavia) NM Nikolaj Kulžinski (49)	4	7	6	7.5
13	(Socialist Federal Republic of Yugoslavia) NM Aleksandar Božić (26)	4	7	6	7.5
14	(Socialist Federal Republic of Yugoslavia) CM Andrija Fuderer (17)	5	4	8	7
15	(Socialist Federal Republic of Yugoslavia) CM Dragoslav Andrić (25)	3	8	6	7
16	(Socialist Federal Republic of Yugoslavia) CM Mijo Udovčić (28)	5	4	8	7
17	(Socialist Federal Republic of Yugoslavia) CM Rudolf Horvat (28)	2	4	11	4
18	(Socialist Federal Republic of Yugoslavia) NM Mladen Šubarić (40)	2	4	11	4
