= 1945 SFR Yugoslavia Chess Championship =

Chess tournament

1st SFR Yugoslavia Chess Championship
- Location: Novi Sad

Champion
- Petar Trifunović

The 1945 SFR Yugoslavia Chess Championship was the 1st edition of SFR Yugoslav Chess Championship. Held between 15 September and 11 October 1945 in Novi Sad, SFR Yugoslavia, SAP Vojvodina. The tournament was won by Petar Trifunović.

== Table and results ==
1st SFR Yugoslavia Chess Championship
N°	Player (age)	Wins	Draws	Losses	Total points
1	(Socialist Federal Republic of Yugoslavia) Petar Trifunović (35)	11	11	1	16.5
2	(Socialist Federal Republic of Yugoslavia) Svetozar Gligorić (22)	14	4	5	16
3	(Socialist Federal Republic of Yugoslavia) Vasja Pirc (38)	11	9	3	15.5
4	(Socialist Federal Republic of Yugoslavia) Borislav Milić (20)	12	6	5	15
5	(Socialist Federal Republic of Yugoslavia) Vasilije Tomović (39)	12	4	7	14
6	(Socialist Federal Republic of Yugoslavia) Sava Vuković (33)	5	17	1	13.5
7	(Socialist Federal Republic of Yugoslavia) Oleg Neikirch (31)	8	11	4	13.5
8	(Socialist Federal Republic of Yugoslavia) Nikolaj Kulžinski (46)	7	12	4	13
9	(Socialist Federal Republic of Yugoslavia) Stojan Puc (24)	6	13	4	12.5
10	(Socialist Federal Republic of Yugoslavia) Braslav Rabar (26)	4	16	3	12
11	(Socialist Federal Republic of Yugoslavia) Alexandar Tsvetkov (31)	4	16	3	12
12	(Socialist Federal Republic of Yugoslavia) Mladen Šubarić (37)	9	5	9	11.5
13	(Socialist Federal Republic of Yugoslavia) Anton Preinfalk (34)	6	11	6	11.5
14	(Socialist Federal Republic of Yugoslavia) Vojislav Popović (30)	6	11	6	11.5
15	(Socialist Federal Republic of Yugoslavia) Milan Vidmar Jr. (36)	7	9	7	11.5
16	(Socialist Federal Republic of Yugoslavia) Borislav Kostić (58)	5	13	5	11.5
17	(Socialist Federal Republic of Yugoslavia) Miroslav Radojčić (25)	6	8	9	10
18	(Socialist Federal Republic of Yugoslavia) Bora Tot (38)	4	12	7	10
19	(Socialist Federal Republic of Yugoslavia) Milan Filipčić (43)	5	9	9	9.5
20	(Socialist Federal Republic of Yugoslavia) Đorđe Poljakov (46)	4	10	9	9
21	(Socialist Federal Republic of Yugoslavia) Janoš Fajer (45)	4	9	10	8.5
22	(Socialist Federal Republic of Yugoslavia) Đorđe Avirović (35)	3	9	11	7.5
23	(Socialist Federal Republic of Yugoslavia) Žarko Popović (36)	3	7	13	6.5
24	(Socialist Federal Republic of Yugoslavia) Božidar Kažić (24)	1	6	16	4
