= 1952 SFR Yugoslavia Chess Championship =

8th SFR Yugoslavia Chess Championship
- Location: Belgrade

Champion
- Petar Trifunović

The 1952 SFR Yugoslavia Chess Championship was the 8th edition of SFR Yugoslav Chess Championship. Held in Belgrade, SFR Yugoslavia, SR Serbia. The tournament was won by Petar Trifunović.

== Table and results ==
8th SFR Yugoslavia Chess Championship
N°	Player	Wins	Draws	Losses	Total points
1	(Socialist Federal Republic of Yugoslavia) Petar Trifunović	9	9	1	13.5
2	(Socialist Federal Republic of Yugoslavia) Andrija Fuderer	10	6	3	13
3	(Socialist Federal Republic of Yugoslavia) Svetozar Gligorić	8	8	3	12
4	(Socialist Federal Republic of Yugoslavia) Borislav Milić	8	8	3	12
5	(Socialist Federal Republic of Yugoslavia) Mijo Udovčić	9	6	4	12
6	(Socialist Federal Republic of Yugoslavia) Vasja Pirc	6	10	3	11
7	(Socialist Federal Republic of Yugoslavia) Dragoslav Andrić	4	12	3	10
8	(Socialist Federal Republic of Yugoslavia) Borislav Ivkov	4	12	3	10
9	(Socialist Federal Republic of Yugoslavia) Srećko Nedeljković	7	6	6	10
10	(Socialist Federal Republic of Yugoslavia) Stojan Puc	5	8	6	9
11	(Socialist Federal Republic of Yugoslavia) Mihailo Trajković	3	12	4	9
12	(Socialist Federal Republic of Yugoslavia) Aleksandar Matanović	4	10	5	9
13	(Socialist Federal Republic of Yugoslavia) Božidar Đurašević	2	14	3	9
14	(Socialist Federal Republic of Yugoslavia) Braslav Rabar	4	10	5	9
15	(Socialist Federal Republic of Yugoslavia) Sava Vuković	3	11	5	8.5
16	(Socialist Federal Republic of Yugoslavia) Rajko Bogdanović	2	12	5	8
17	(Socialist Federal Republic of Yugoslavia) Aleksandar Božić	3	9	7	7.5
18	(Socialist Federal Republic of Yugoslavia) Dragutin Đaja	2	9	8	6.5
19	(Socialist Federal Republic of Yugoslavia) Slavko Krivec	2	8	9	6
20	(Socialist Federal Republic of Yugoslavia) Zvonko Kržišnik	0	10	9	5
