= 1946 SFR Yugoslavia Chess Championship =

Chess tournament

2nd SFR Yugoslavia Chess Championship
- Location: Zagreb

Champion
- Petar Trifunović

The 1946 SFR Yugoslavia Chess Championship was the 2nd edition of SFR Yugoslav Chess Championship. Held between 15 September and 11 October 1946 in Zagreb, SFR Yugoslavia, SR Croatia. The tournament was won by Petar Trifunović.

== Table and results ==
2nd SFR Yugoslavia Chess Championship
N°	Player (age)	Wins	Draws	Losses	Total points
1	(Socialist Federal Republic of Yugoslavia) Petar Trifunović (36)	10	7	1	13.5
2	(Socialist Federal Republic of Yugoslavia) Svetozar Gligorić (23)	9	6	3	12
3	(Socialist Federal Republic of Yugoslavia) Vasja Pirc (39)	6	10	2	11
4	(Socialist Federal Republic of Yugoslavia) Vasilije Tomović (40)	8	6	4	11
5	(Socialist Federal Republic of Yugoslavia) Sava Vuković (34)	7	7	4	10.5
6	(Socialist Federal Republic of Yugoslavia) Milan Vidmar Jr. (37)	4	12	2	10
7	(Socialist Federal Republic of Yugoslavia) Bora Tot (39)	5	9	4	9.5
8	(Socialist Federal Republic of Yugoslavia) Mihajlo Marković (23)	6	6	6	9
9	(Socialist Federal Republic of Yugoslavia) Stojan Puc (25)	6	6	6	9
10	(Socialist Federal Republic of Yugoslavia) Borislav Kostić (59)	5	8	5	9
11	(Socialist Federal Republic of Yugoslavia) Aleksandar Božić (24)	5	8	5	9
12	(Socialist Federal Republic of Yugoslavia) Braslav Rabar (27)	3	10	5	8
13	(Socialist Federal Republic of Yugoslavia) Borko Simonović (27)	4	8	6	8
14	(Socialist Federal Republic of Yugoslavia) Pavle Bidev (34)	5	5	8	7.5
15	(Socialist Federal Republic of Yugoslavia) Mladen Šubarić (38)	3	9	6	7.5
16	(Socialist Federal Republic of Yugoslavia) Igor Kindij (33)	6	3	9	7.5
17	(Socialist Federal Republic of Yugoslavia) Borislav Milić (21)	4	6	8	7
18	(Socialist Federal Republic of Yugoslavia) Sadi Kalabar (45)	4	6	8	7
19	(Socialist Federal Republic of Yugoslavia) Ivo Tekavčić (47)	2	6	10	5
