= 1950 SFR Yugoslavia Chess Championship =

6th SFR Yugoslavia Chess Championship
- Location: Ljubljana

Champion
- Svetozar Gligorić

The 1950 SFR Yugoslavia Chess Championship was the 6th edition of SFR Yugoslav Chess Championship. Held in Ljubljana, SFR Yugoslavia, SR Slovenia. The tournament was won by Svetozar Gligorić. Vasja Pirc withdrew after eight rounds.

== Table and results ==
6th SFR Yugoslavia Chess Championship
N°	Player	Wins	Draws	Losses	Total points
1	(Socialist Federal Republic of Yugoslavia) Svetozar Gligorić	6	11	0	11.5
2	(Socialist Federal Republic of Yugoslavia) Aleksandar Matanović	6	10	1	11
3	(Socialist Federal Republic of Yugoslavia) Stojan Puc	7	7	3	10.5
4	(Socialist Federal Republic of Yugoslavia) Borislav Milić	5	10	2	10
5	(Socialist Federal Republic of Yugoslavia) Mijo Udovčić	4	11	2	9.5
6	(Socialist Federal Republic of Yugoslavia) Petar Trifunović	2	15	0	9.5
7	(Socialist Federal Republic of Yugoslavia) Braslav Rabar	4	10	3	9
8	(Socialist Federal Republic of Yugoslavia) Srećko Nedeljković	5	8	4	9
9	(Socialist Federal Republic of Yugoslavia) Milan Vidmar Jr.	3	12	2	9
10	(Socialist Federal Republic of Yugoslavia) Nikola Karaklajić	3	11	3	8.5
11	(Socialist Federal Republic of Yugoslavia) Andrija Fuderer	5	6	6	8
12	(Socialist Federal Republic of Yugoslavia) Dragoljub Janošević	6	4	7	8
13	(Socialist Federal Republic of Yugoslavia) Borislav Kostić	2	11	4	7.5
14	(Socialist Federal Republic of Yugoslavia) Vladimir Kozomara	2	10	5	7
15	(Socialist Federal Republic of Yugoslavia) Mario Bertok	3	8	6	7
16	(Socialist Federal Republic of Yugoslavia) Borko Simonović	4	5	8	6.5
17	(Socialist Federal Republic of Yugoslavia) Dragoslav Andrić	3	7	7	6.5
18	(Socialist Federal Republic of Yugoslavia) Ljubinko Majstorović	1	8	8	5
