= 1951 SFR Yugoslavia Chess Championship =

7th SFR Yugoslavia Chess Championship
- Location: Sarajevo

Champion
- Braslav Rabar

The 1951 SFR Yugoslavia Chess Championship was the 7th edition of SFR Yugoslav Chess Championship. Held in Sarajevo, SFR Yugoslavia, SR Bosnia & Herzegovina. The tournament was won by Braslav Rabar.

== Table and results ==
7th SFR Yugoslavia Chess Championship
| N° | Player | Wins | Draws | Losses | Total points |
|---|---|---|---|---|---|
| 1 | (Socialist Federal Republic of Yugoslavia) Braslav Rabar | 9 | 8 | 2 | 13 |
| 2 | (Socialist Federal Republic of Yugoslavia) Petar Trifunović | 6 | 12 | 1 | 12 |
| 3 | (Socialist Federal Republic of Yugoslavia) Andrija Fuderer | 8 | 8 | 3 | 12 |
| 4 | (Socialist Federal Republic of Yugoslavia) Mijo Udovčić | 8 | 6 | 5 | 11 |
| 5 | (Socialist Federal Republic of Yugoslavia) Dragoslav Andrić | 6 | 10 | 3 | 11 |
| 6 | (Socialist Federal Republic of Yugoslavia) Milan Germek | 6 | 10 | 3 | 11 |
| 7 | (Socialist Federal Republic of Yugoslavia) Svetozar Gligorić | 5 | 11 | 3 | 10.5 |
| 8 | (Socialist Federal Republic of Yugoslavia) Nikola Karaklajić | 6 | 8 | 5 | 10 |
| 9 | (Socialist Federal Republic of Yugoslavia) Dragoljub Janošević | 6 | 8 | 5 | 10 |
| 10 | (Socialist Federal Republic of Yugoslavia) Srećko Nedeljković | 5 | 9 | 5 | 9.5 |
| 11 | (Socialist Federal Republic of Yugoslavia) Bora Tot | 6 | 7 | 6 | 9.5 |
| 12 | (Socialist Federal Republic of Yugoslavia) Borislav Ivkov | 4 | 11 | 4 | 9.5 |
| 13 | (Socialist Federal Republic of Yugoslavia) Mario Bertok | 3 | 12 | 4 | 9 |
| 14 | (Socialist Federal Republic of Yugoslavia) Aleksandar Matanović | 3 | 12 | 4 | 9 |
| 15 | (Socialist Federal Republic of Yugoslavia) Juraj Nikolac | 5 | 7 | 7 | 8.5 |
| 16 | (Socialist Federal Republic of Yugoslavia) Ivo Bajec | 2 | 12 | 5 | 8 |
| 17 | (Socialist Federal Republic of Yugoslavia) Stojan Puc | 3 | 10 | 6 | 8 |
| 18 | (Socialist Federal Republic of Yugoslavia) Borislav Milić | 4 | 8 | 7 | 8 |
| 19 | (Socialist Federal Republic of Yugoslavia) Milan Longer | 3 | 6 | 10 | 6 |
| 20 | (Socialist Federal Republic of Yugoslavia) Igor Kindij | 2 | 5 | 12 | 4.5 |
