= 1961 SFR Yugoslavia Chess Championship =

16th edition of SFR Yugoslav Chess Championship

16th SFR Yugoslavia Chess Championship
- Location: Zagreb

Champion
- Petar Trifunović

The 1961 SFR Yugoslavia Chess Championship was the 16th edition of SFR Yugoslav Chess Championship. Held in Zagreb, SFR Yugoslavia, SR Croatia. The tournament was won by Petar Trifunović.

14th SFR Yugoslavia Chess Championship
N°	Player (age)	Wins	Draws	Losses	Total points
1	(Socialist Federal Republic of Yugoslavia) Petar Trifunović (51)	8	11	0	13.5
2	(Socialist Federal Republic of Yugoslavia) Milan Matulović (26)	10	5	4	12.5
3	(Socialist Federal Republic of Yugoslavia) Mijo Udovčić (41)	7	11	1	12.5
4	(Socialist Federal Republic of Yugoslavia) Stojan Puc (40)	8	9	2	12.5
5	(Socialist Federal Republic of Yugoslavia) Dragoljub Ćirić (26)	4	15	0	11.5
6	(Socialist Federal Republic of Yugoslavia) Dragoljub Minić (24)	5	12	2	11
7	(Socialist Federal Republic of Yugoslavia) Dražen Marović (23)	7	8	4	11
8	(Socialist Federal Republic of Yugoslavia) Braslav Rabar (42)	6	10	3	11
9	(Socialist Federal Republic of Yugoslavia) Mihajlo Mihaljčišin (28)	9	4	6	11
10	(Socialist Federal Republic of Yugoslavia) Mario Bertok (32)	4	13	2	10.5
11	(Socialist Federal Republic of Yugoslavia) Nikola Karaklajić (35)	2	16	1	10
12	(Socialist Federal Republic of Yugoslavia) Vladimir Sokolov (28)	4	11	4	9.5
13	(Socialist Federal Republic of Yugoslavia) Vinko Cuderman (28)	3	12	4	9
14	(Socialist Federal Republic of Yugoslavia) Mato Damjanović (34)	5	6	8	8
15	(Socialist Federal Republic of Yugoslavia) Jovan Sofrevski (26)	3	10	6	8
16	(Socialist Federal Republic of Yugoslavia) Zdravko Vospernik (27)	5	5	9	7.5
17	(Socialist Federal Republic of Yugoslavia) Janez Stupica (26)	3	9	7	7.5
18	(Socialist Federal Republic of Yugoslavia) Đorđe Đantar (30)	4	5	10	6.5
19	(Socialist Federal Republic of Yugoslavia) Krum Krstev (28)	2	3	14	3.5
20	(Socialist Federal Republic of Yugoslavia) Fahrudin Suvalić (31)	1	5	13	3.5
