= 1960 SFR Yugoslavia Chess Championship =

15th edition of SFR Yugoslav Chess Championship

15th SFR Yugoslavia Chess Championship
- Location: Ljubljana

Champion
- Svetozar Gligorić

The 1960 SFR Yugoslavia Chess Championship was the 15th edition of SFR Yugoslav Chess Championship. Held in Ljubljana, SFR Yugoslavia, SR Slovenia. The tournament was won by Svetozar Gligorić.

14th SFR Yugoslavia Chess Championship
N°	Player (age)	Wins	Draws	Losses	Total points
1	(Socialist Federal Republic of Yugoslavia) Svetozar Gligorić (37)	9	8	0	13
2	(Socialist Federal Republic of Yugoslavia) Mario Bertok (31)	7	10	0	12
3	(Socialist Federal Republic of Yugoslavia) Petar Trifunović (50)	4	13	0	10.5
4	(Socialist Federal Republic of Yugoslavia) Milan Matulović (25)	9	3	5	10.5
5	(Socialist Federal Republic of Yugoslavia) Mijo Udovčić (40)	5	9	3	9.5
6	(Socialist Federal Republic of Yugoslavia) Ante Bulat (28)	4	11	2	9.5
7	(Socialist Federal Republic of Yugoslavia) Mato Damjanović (33)	7	5	5	9.5
8	(Socialist Federal Republic of Yugoslavia) Stojan Puc (39)	4	11	2	9.5
9	(Socialist Federal Republic of Yugoslavia) Jovan Sofrevski (25)	5	9	3	9.5
10	(Socialist Federal Republic of Yugoslavia) Dragoljub Janošević (37)	7	4	6	9
11	(Socialist Federal Republic of Yugoslavia) Bruno Parma (19)	4	10	3	9
12	(Socialist Federal Republic of Yugoslavia) Petar Smederevac (38)	2	13	2	8.5
13	(Socialist Federal Republic of Yugoslavia) Dragoljub Ćirić (25)	1	12	4	7
14	(Socialist Federal Republic of Yugoslavia) Dragoljub Minić (23)	3	7	7	6.5
15	(Socialist Federal Republic of Yugoslavia) Vladimir Kozomara (38)	1	10	6	6
16	(Socialist Federal Republic of Yugoslavia) Milorad Knežević (24)	1	8	8	5
17	(Socialist Federal Republic of Yugoslavia) Bora Tot (53)	3	4	10	5
18	(Socialist Federal Republic of Yugoslavia) Milosav Vuković (?)	1	5	11	3.5
