= Zorica Nikolin =

Serbian chess player (born 1961)

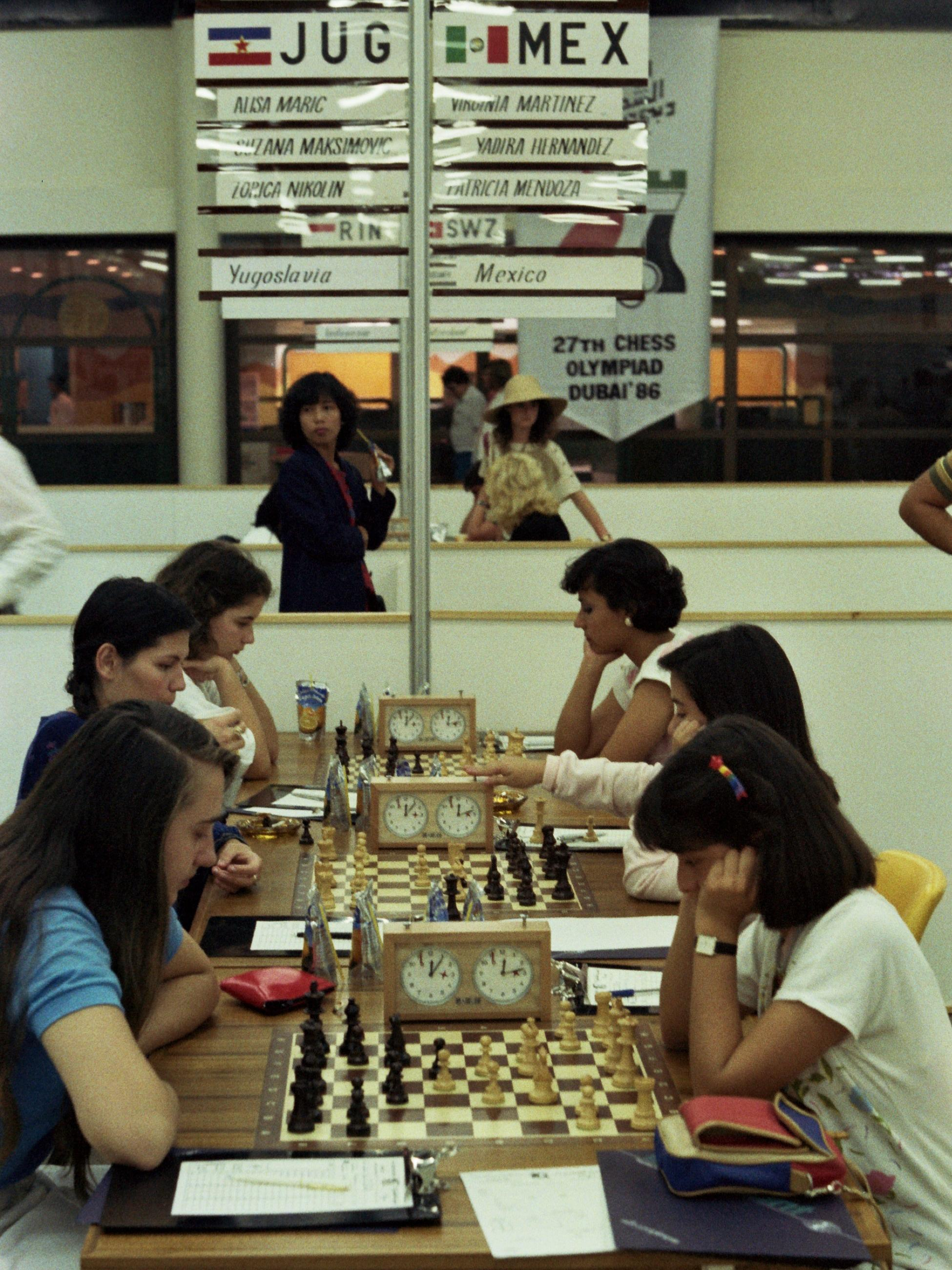
- Alisa Marić, Suzana Maksimović, Zorica Nikolin, Virginia Martinez, Yadira Hernandez, Patricia Mendoza, Chess Olympiad 1986 in Dubai

Personal information
- Born: 8 April 1961 (age 65) Yugoslavia

Chess career
- Country: Yugoslavia → Serbia
- Title: Woman International Master

Zorica Nikolin (Serbian Cyrillic: Зорица Николин; born 8 April 1961) is a Serbian chess player who holds the FIDE title of Woman International Master (1982). She is a two-time winner of the Yugoslav Women's Chess Championship (1985, 1987).

== Biography ==
In the 1980s Zorica Nikolin was one of the leading Yugoslav women's chess players. She twice won the Yugoslav Women's Championship in 1985 and 1987. In 1982, she was awarded the FIDE Woman International Master (WIM) title.

She participated three times in the Women's World Chess Championship Interzonal Tournaments:

- In 1982, at Interzonal Tournament in Tbilisi shared 10th-11th place;
- In 1987, at Interzonal Tournament in Tuzla shared 15th-16th place;
- In 1995, at Interzonal Tournament in Chişinău shared 39th-42nd place.

Nikolin played for Yugoslavia in the Women's Chess Olympiads:

- In 1982, at first reserve board in the 10th Chess Olympiad (women) in Lucerne (+3, =4, -3),
- In 1986, at first reserve board in the 27th Chess Olympiad (women) in Dubai (+7, =2, -3),
- In 1990, at second board in the 29th Chess Olympiad (women) in Novi Sad (+5, =3, -1).
