= Dušan Rajković =

Serbian chess grandmaster (born 1942)

Personal information
- Born: 17 June 1942 (age 84) Kruševac, Serbia

Chess career
- Country: Yugoslavia; Serbia
- Title: Grandmaster (1977)
- Peak rating: 2522 (July 2007)

Dušan Rajković (Serbian: Душан Рајковић; born 17 June 1942) is a Serbian chess Grandmaster (GM) (1977). He is a Yugoslav Chess Championship winner (1983) and European Team Chess Championship silver medalist (1983).

== Biography ==
From 1962, Dušan Rajković took part in the finals of Yugoslav Chess Championships many times. In 1983 in Herceg Novi he shared the 1st place together with Božidar Ivanović, both were declared champions of Yugoslavia.

Dušan Rajković won the international chess tournaments of:

- Vrnjačka Banja in 1976;
- Smederevska Palanka in 1977 and 1979 (also 2nd in the tournament in 1981 and 1982);
- Athens (Acropolis) in 1980;
- Brussels in 1987 (OHRA tournament);
- Bačka Palanka in 2002.

He also finished second in the international chess tournaments of:

- Majdanpek in 1976;
- Vršac in 1979 (tournament won by Michael Stean);
- Baden-Baden in 1988 (tournament won by Vitaly Tseshkovsky).

Dušan Rajković played for Yugoslavia in the European Team Chess Championship:

- In 1983, at seventh board in the 8th European Team Chess Championship in Plovdiv (+0, =5, -0) and won team silver medal.

Dušan Rajković played for Yugoslavia in the World Student Team Chess Championships:

- In 1966, at second board in the 13th World Student Team Chess Championship in Örebro (+7, =3, -2),
- In 1967, at second board in the 14th World Student Team Chess Championship in Harrachov (+2, =4, -3),
- In 1968, at fourth board in the 15th World Student Team Chess Championship in Ybbs (+5, =7, -1).

Dušan Rajković played for Yugoslavia in the Men's Chess Balkaniad:

- In 1977, at fourth board in the 9th Men's Chess Balkaniad in Albena (+2, =1, -1) and won team silver and individual bronze medals,
- In 1978, at fourth board in the 10th Men's Chess Balkaniad in Băile Herculane (+0, =1, -0) and won team gold medal,
- In 1979, at fifth board in the 11th Chess Balkaniad in Bihać (+2, =2, -0) and won team and individual gold medals,
- In 1980, at fifth board in the 12th Chess Balkaniad in Istanbul (+2, =2, -0) and won team gold and individual silver medals,
- In 1982, at second board in the 14th Chess Balkaniad in Plovdiv (+2, =2, -0) and won team silver and individual gold medals,
- In 1986, at third board in the 18th Chess Balkaniad in Sofia (+0, =4, -1) and won team silver medal.

In 1974, Dušan Rajković was awarded the FIDE International Master (IM) title and received the FIDE Grandmaster (GM) title three years later. He became a FIDE Trainer in 2005.
