= Micic =

Micić and Mićić (Serbian Cyrillic: Мицић, Мићић), anglicized as Micic, are Serbian surnames. Notable people with these names include:

== Micic ==
- Elena Micic (born 2004), Australian tennis player
- Frank Micic (born 1940), Australian association football midfielder
- Rale Micic (born 1975), Serbian jazz guitarist and composer

== Micić ==
- Nina Micić (born 1991), Serbian Olympic snowboarder
- Vasilije Micić (born 1994) Serbian basketball point guard

== Mićić ==
- Branislav Mićić (born 1990), Swiss football defender
- Danijel Mićić (born 1988), Austrian football midfielder
- Dragan Mićić (born 1969), Serbian football coach and forward
- Dušan Mićić (born 1984), Serbian football midfielder
- Jordanka Belić (born 1964 as Mičić), Serbian and German chess grandmaster
- Marijana Mićić (born 1983), Serbian television host and actress
- Milica Mićić Dimovska (1947–2013), Serbian writer
- Nataša Mićić (born 1965), Serbian politician
