= Imre König =

Hungarian chess player

Imre König (Koenig) aka Mirko Kenig (February 9, 1901, Kula – September 9, 1992, Santa Monica, California) was a chess master representing Yugoslavia and Great Britain.

He was born in Kula, and also lived in Austria, England and the USA during the troubled times between the two world wars.

In 1921, he took 2nd in Celje. In 1920s König played in several tournaments in Vienna; he was 3rd in 1921, 14th in 1922 (Akiba Rubinstein won), 3rd-4th in 1925, 4-5th in 1926 (Rudolf Spielmann won), and 3rd-5th in 1926. He took 12th in Rogaška Slatina (Rohitsch-Sauerbrunn) in 1929. The event was won by Rubinstein. In 1929/30, he took 7th in Vienna (Hans Kmoch and Spielmann won). In 1931, he took 4th in Vienna (Albert Becker won). In 1936, he tied for 6-7th in Novi Sad (Vasja Pirc won). In 1937, he tied for 2nd-4th in Belgrade (Vasilije Tomović won).

Mirko Kenig represented Yugoslavia in the 4th Chess Olympiad at Prague 1931 (+5 –1 =2), the 6th Chess Olympiad at Warsaw 1935 (+5 –2 =8), and in 3rd unofficial Chess Olympiad at Munich 1936 (+7 –4 =7).

In 1938, Imre König emigrated to England. In 1939, he tied for 4-5th in Bournemouth (Max Euwe won), and shared 1st with Philip Stuart Milner-Barry in Hampstead. In 1946, he took 4th in London. In 1948/49, he took 2nd, behind Nicolas Rossolimo, in the Hastings International Chess Congress.

In 1949, he became a naturalized British citizen. However, in 1953 he moved to the United States.

König was awarded the International Master title in 1951.
