= Vasilije Tomović =

Montenegrin chess player

Vasilije Tomović a.k.a. Vasily Tomovic (born 11 May 1906, died c. 1994) was a Montenegrin chess master. He was born in Mateševo.

Before World War II, Vasilije Tomovic was the first significant chess player in Montenegro. He was also mathematician and philosopher. In April 1936, he tied for 11-12th in Novi Sad (the 2nd Yugoslav Chess Championship, Vasja Pirc won). In February–March 1937, he won in Belgrade, ahead of Matveef, Petar Trifunović and Imre König. In 1939, he took 2nd, behind Milan Vidmar, in Zagreb (YUG-ch), shared 3rd at Zagreb 1946 (YUG-ch),

After the war, he took 5th at Novi Sad 1945 (YUG-ch, Trifunović won), tied for 5-6th at Ljubljana 1945 (Svetozar Gligorić won), shared 3rd at Zagreb 1946 (YUG-ch), tied for 6-7th at Ljubljana 1947 (YUG-ch), took 15th at Budapest 1948 (László Szabó won), and took 19th at Zagreb 1949 (YUG-ch).
