= Mirko Bröder =

Hungarian-Serbian chess player

Personal information
- Born: 1911 Budapest, Austro-Hungarian Empire
- Died: 1943 (aged 31 or 32) Yugoslavia

Chess career
- Country: Yugoslavia
- Title: National Master

Mirko (Imre) Bröder, also Broeder, Broder, Breder (1911–1943) was a Hungarian–born Yugoslav chess master.

Born in Budapest, he grew up in Novi Sad, Voivodina (then Kingdom of Serbs, Croats, and Slovenes), where he studied law. He won a simultaneous game against Alexander Alekhine at Novi Sad 1930, took 2nd in 1930, 4th in 1931, and 2nd in 1933, all in Novi Sad (local tournaments), tied for 4-5th at Novi Sad 1936 (the 2nd Yugoslav Chess Championship, Vasja Pirc won), and tied for 9-10th at Ljubljana 1938 (the 4th YUG-ch, Boris Kostić won).

Bröder played for Yugoslavia in 3rd unofficial Chess Olympiad at Munich 1936 on eighth board (+7 −2 =8), and in the 7th Chess Olympiad at Stockholm 1937 on first reserve board (+4 −2 =7).

During World War II, he died at the hands of the Nazis in 1943.
