= Sava Vuković =

Sava Vuković may refer to:

- Sebő Vukovics (1811–1872), Hungarian politician of Serbian descent
- Sava Vuković (chess player) (1912–1961), Serbian chess master
- Sava Vuković (bishop) (1930–2001), Serbian Orthodox bishop
