= Mladen Šubarić =

Croatian chess player (1908–1991)

Mladen Šubarić (9 July 1908–1991) was a Croatian chess master.

In 1939 he tied for 3rd-4th in Zagreb (Svetozar Gligorić won). In December 1941, he played at fourth board against dr Pazman (2 : 0) in a match Croatia – Slovakia in Zagreb. Šubarić took 9th at Munich 1942 (European Individual Chess Championship, Wertungsturnier – Qualification Tournament, Gösta Danielsson won).

After World War II, he played several times in Yugoslav Chess Championship. In 1945 he tied for 12-16th in Novi Sad (Petar Trifunović won). In 1946 he tied for 14-16th in Zagreb (Trifunović won). In 1948, he tied for 17-18th in Belgrade (Gligorić and Vasja Pirc won).

In other tournaments, he won ahead of Mijo Udovčić at Zagreb 1948, and took 2nd, behind Braslav Rabar, at Zagreb 1950 (CRO-ch).
