= 1st Women's Chess Olympiad =

International women's chess tournament

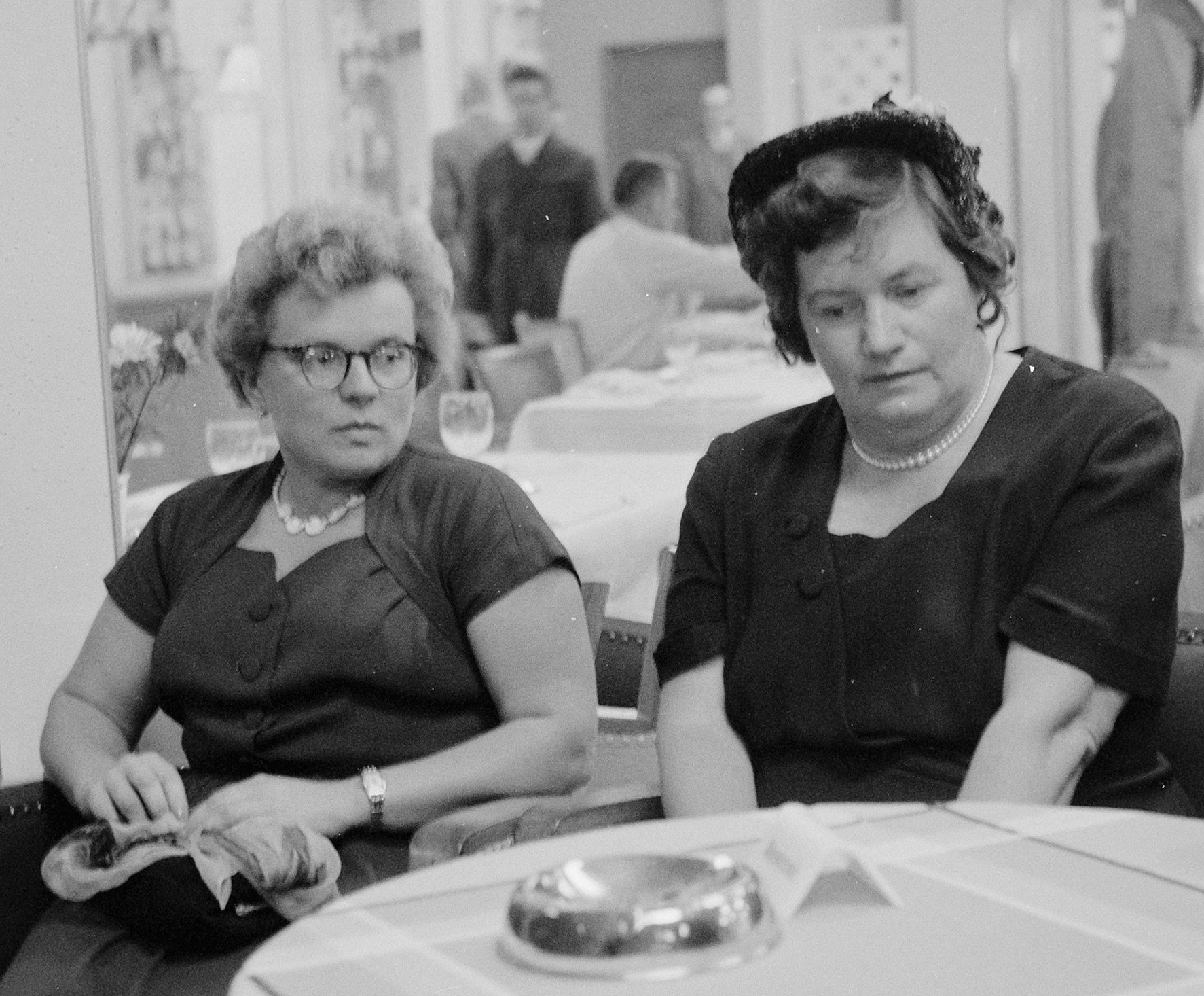
Kira Zvorykina and Olga Rubtsova, the winning Soviet Union team.

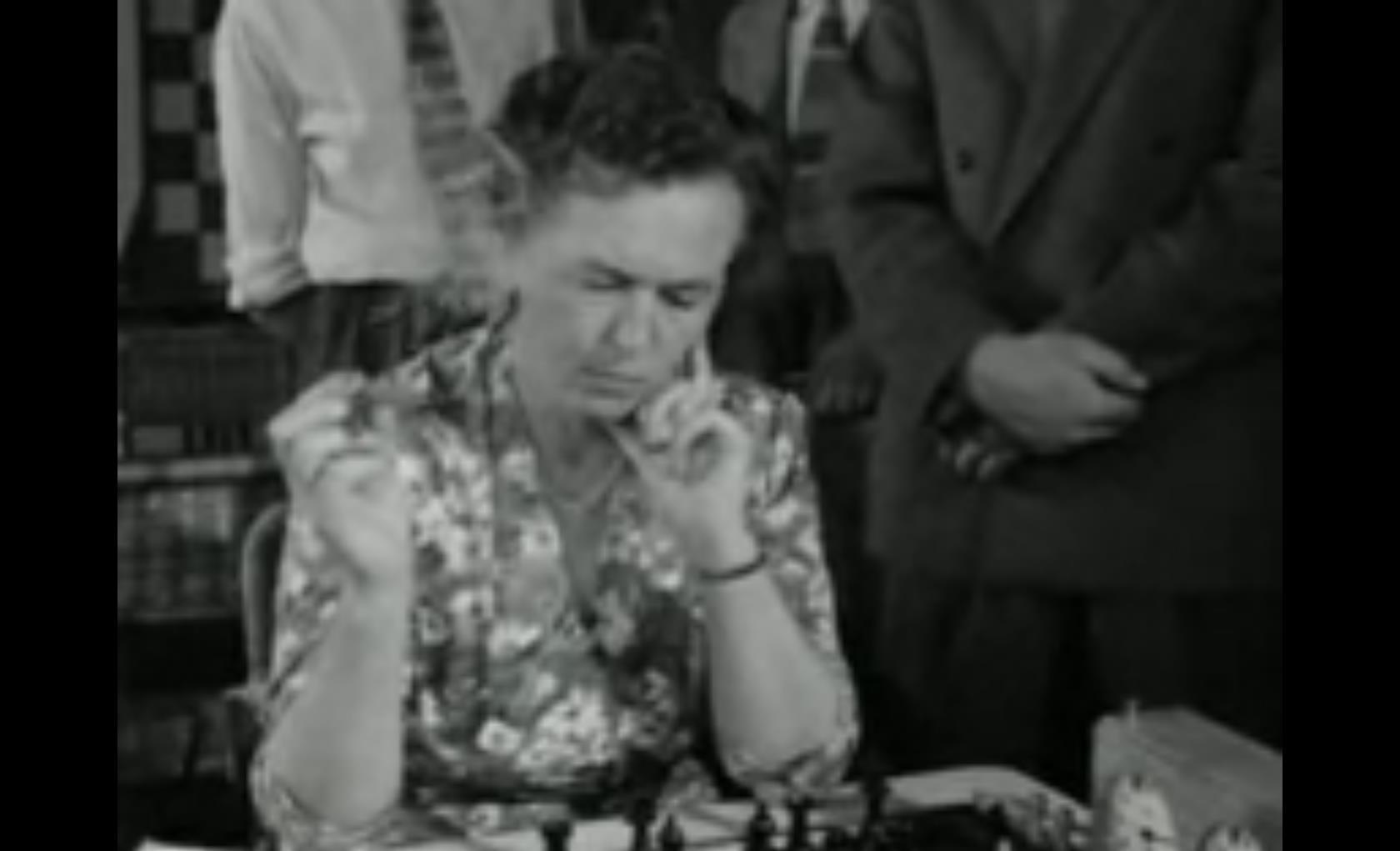
Ingrid Larsen, who played on the Danish team who finished 13th.

Short news video on the Olympiad.

The 1st Women's Chess Olympiad, organized by the FIDE, took place between 2 and 21 September 1957, in Emmen, Netherlands.

== Results ==
=== Preliminaries ===
A total of 21 two-woman teams entered the competition and were divided into three preliminary groups of seven teams. The top three from each group advanced to Final A, the teams placed 4th–5th to Final B, and 6th–7th to Final C. All groups and finals were played as round-robin tournaments.

Group 1 was won by the Soviet Union, well ahead of Netherlands and Romania.

East Germany took first place in group 2, ahead of Bulgaria and Hungary.

Group 3 was won by Yugoslavia, ahead of West Germany and England.

- Group 1:

Final	Country	1	2	3	4	5	6	7	+	−	=	Points
«A»	Soviet Union	-	1½	1½	2	2	2	2	6	0	0	11
«A»	Netherlands	½	-	1	1	2	1½	1½	3	1	2	7½
«A»	Romania	½	1	-	1	1½	1½	1½	3	1	2	7
«B»	Czechoslovakia	0	1	1	-	½	2	1½	2	2	2	6
«B»	Ireland	0	0	½	1½	-	1	2	2	3	1	5
«C»	France	0	½	½	0	1	-	1½	1	4	1	3½
«C»	Finland	0	½	½	½	0	½	-	0	6	0	2

- Group 2:

Final	Country	1	2	3	4	5	6	7	+	−	=	Points
«A»	East Germany	-	1	1	2	2	2	2	4	0	2	10
«A»	Bulgaria	1	-	1½	1	1½	2	2	4	0	2	9
«A»	Hungary	1	½	-	1½	1	2	2	3	1	2	8
«B»	United States	0	1	½	-	2	1½	2	3	2	1	7
«B»	Scotland	0	½	1	0	-	½	1½	1	4	1	3½
«C»	Austria	0	0	0	½	1½	-	1	1	4	1	3
«C»	Luxembourg	0	0	0	0	½	1	-	0	5	1	1½

- Group 3:

Final	Country	1	2	3	4	5	6	7	+	−	=	Points
«A»	Yugoslavia	-	1½	½	2	1½	1	2	4	1	1	8½
«A»	West Germany	½	-	1	1	2	2	2	3	1	2	8½
«A»	England	1½	1	-	1	½	2	2	3	1	2	8
«B»	Poland	0	1	1	-	2	2	2	3	1	2	8
«B»	Denmark	½	0	1½	0	-	2	2	3	3	0	6
«C»	Norway	1	0	0	0	0	-	2	1	4	1	3
«C»	Belgium	0	0	0	0	0	0	-	0	6	0	0

=== Final ===
Final A
#	Country	Players	Points	MP
1	Soviet Union	Olga Rubtsova, Kira Zvorykina	10½	12
2	Romania	Maria Pogorevici, Margareta Teodorescu	10½	10
3	East Germany	Edith Keller-Herrmann, Ursula Altrichter	10	
4	Hungary	Irén Hönsch, Éva Kertész	8½	
5	Bulgaria	Venka Asenova, Antonia Ivanova	8	
6	Yugoslavia	Lidija Timofejeva, Tereza Štadler	7½	
7	England	Elaine Pritchard, Eileen Betsy Tranmer	7	
8	West Germany	Friedl Rinder, Ruth Landmesser	6	
9	Netherlands	Fenny Heemskerk, Catharina Roodzant, A. van der Veen	4	

Final B
#	Country	Players	Points	MP
10	United States	Gisela Kahn Gresser, Jacqueline Piatigorsky	8	9
11	Czechoslovakia	Nina Hrušková-Bělská, Květa Eretová	8	8
12	Poland	Krystyna Hołuj, Mirosława Litmanowicz	7½	
13	Denmark	Ingrid Larsen, Merete Haahr	4½	
14=	Ireland	Hilda Chater, Beth Cassidy	1	1
14=	Scotland	Peggy Steedman, R. P. Foggie	1	1

Final C
#	Country	Players	Points
16	France	Chantal Chaudé de Silans, Isabelle Choko	8½
17	Austria	Alfreda Hausner, Berta Zebinger	7½
18	Finland	Sirkka-Liisa Vuorenpää, Gunnel Jägerhorn	6
19	Norway	Tora Mølman, Carthy Skjønsberg	4½
20	Belgium	Elisabeth Cuypers, Lilly Bollekens	2½
21	Luxembourg	Tresch, Welter	1

=== Final «A» ===
№	Country	1	2	3	4	5	6	7	8	9	+	−	=	Points
1	Soviet Union	-	1	1½	1	1	1	1½	1½	2	4	0	4	10½
2	Romania	1	-	1	1	1	2	½	2	2	3	1	4	10½
3	East Germany	½	1	-	1½	1½	1½	1½	1	1½	5	1	2	10
4	Hungary	1	1	½	-	½	1	1½	1½	1½	3	2	3	8½
5	Bulgaria	1	1	½	1½	-	1	1	0	2	2	2	4	8
6	Yugoslavia	1	0	½	1	1	-	1½	2	½	2	3	3	7½
7	England	½	1½	½	½	1	½	-	1	1½	2	4	2	7
8	West Germany	½	0	1	½	2	0	1	-	1	1	4	3	6
9	Netherlands	0	0	½	½	0	1½	½	1	-	1	6	1	4

=== Final «B» ===
№	Country	10	11	12	13	14	15	+	−	=	Points
10	United States	-	1	1½	1½	2	2	4	0	1	8
11	Czechoslovakia	1	-	1	2	2	2	3	0	2	8
12	Poland	½	1	-	2	2	2	3	1	1	7½
13	Denmark	½	0	0	-	2	2	2	3	2	4½
14=	Ireland	0	0	0	0	-	1	0	4	1	1
14=	Scotland	0	0	0	0	1	-	0	4	1	1

=== Final «C» ===
№	Country	16	17	18	19	20	21	+	−	=	Points
16	France	-	1½	1½	1½	2	2	5	0	0	8½
17	Austria	½	-	1½	1½	2	2	4	1	0	7½
18	Finland	½	½	-	1½	2	1½	3	2	0	6
19	Norway	½	½	½	-	1½	1½	2	3	0	4½
20	Belgium	0	0	0	½	-	2	1	4	0	2½
21	Luxembourg	0	0	½	½	0	-	0	5	0	1

=== Individual medals ===
- Board 1: (Poland) Krystyna Hołuj-Radzikowska 9 / 11 = 71.8%
- Board 2: (Soviet Union) Kira Zvorykina 12 / 14 = 85.7%
