= Srđan Marangunić =

Croatian chess player

Personal information
- Born: 31 October 1943 (age 82) Zagreb, Croatia

Chess career
- Country: Yugoslavia; Croatia
- Title: International Master (1971)
- Peak rating: 2495 (January 1979)

Srđan Marangunić (born 31 October 1943) is a Croatian chess International Master (1971). He is a Yugoslav Chess Championship winner ((tied, 1977) and European Team Chess Championship bronze medalist (1977).

== Biography ==
In the 1970s, Srđan Marangunić was one of the leading Yugoslav chess players. In 1971, he was awarded the FIDE International Master (IM) title. In 1977 in Zagreb Srđan Marangunić shared the 1st place together with Ljubomir Ljubojević, both were declared champions of Yugoslavia.

Srđan Marangunić played for Yugoslavia in the European Team Chess Championship:

- In 1977, at second reserve board in the 6th European Team Chess Championship in Moscow (+0, =1, -0) and won team bronze medal.

Srđan Marangunić played for Yugoslavia in the World Student Team Chess Championships:

- In 1966, at first reserve board in the 13th World Student Team Chess Championship in Örebro (+3, =3, -1),
- In 1967, at first reserve board in the 14th World Student Team Chess Championship in Harrachov (+3, =1, -2),
- In 1968, at first reserve board in the 15th World Student Team Chess Championship in Ybbs (+2, =1, -2).

Srđan Marangunić played for Yugoslavia in the Men's Chess Balkaniad:

- In 1971, at first reserve board in the 3rd Men's Chess Balkaniad in Athens (+2, =2, -0) and won team bronze and individual gold medals.
