= Vlasta Maček =

Croatian chess player (1952–2026)

Personal information
- Born: 27 June 1952
- Died: 8 September 2026 (aged 74)

Chess career
- Country: Yugoslavia (before 1991); Croatia (after 1991)
- Title: Woman International Master (1974)
- FIDE rating: 2084 (November 2018)
- Peak rating: 2277 (July 2000)

Vlasta Maček (née Kalchbrenner, 27 June 1952 – 8 September 2026) was a Croatian chess player who held the title of Woman International Master (WIM, 1974). She won Yugoslav Women's Chess Championship (1980) and twice won Croatian Women's Chess Championship (1992, 1999). Maček was a Women's Chess Olympiad individual bronze medalist (1974) and first European Senior Chess Championship (women) winner (2003).

== Biography ==
From the early 1970s to the mid-2000s Vlasta Maček was one of the leading Croatian women's chess players. In 1971, she made her first major victory in the International Women's Tournament in Emmen. In 1973, she won the Balkans Women's Chess Championship. She has repeatedly participated in Yugoslav Women's Chess Championship, where she twice (1973, 1980) shared first place, and became champion in 1980. In 1974, she was awarded the FIDE Woman International Master (WIM) title.

Maček represented Croatia after the breakup of Yugoslavia. She won the Croatian Women's Chess Championship twice (1992, 1999) and the second place in this championships three more times (2002, 2004, 2006). In 1997, in Rijeka Vlasta Maček with Croatian chess club ŠK Kastav won 2nd European Chess Club Cup (women) team gold medal.

She two times participated in the Women's World Chess Championship European Zonal Tournaments:

- in 1975 in Pula at European zonal 2 she shared 8th–9th place;
- in 1993 in Zagreb at Zonal 1.2b (Central Europe) she shared 2nd–4th place.

Maček played for Yugoslavia and Croatia in the Women's Chess Olympiads:

- In 1974, at first reserve board in the 6th Chess Olympiad (women) in Medellín (+2, =4, -1) and won individual bronze medal,
- In 1978, at second board in the 8th Chess Olympiad (women) in Buenos Aires (+5, =8, -0),
- In 1982, at first reserve board in the 10th Chess Olympiad (women) in Lucerne (+3, =5, -1),
- In 1992, at second board in the 30th Chess Olympiad (women) in Manila (+6, =0, -5),
- In 1994, at second board in the 31st Chess Olympiad (women) in Moscow (+4, =5, -4),
- In 1996, at second board in the 32nd Chess Olympiad (women) in Yerevan (+4, =7, -2),
- In 1998, at second board in the 33rd Chess Olympiad (women) in Elista (+5, =3, -3),
- In 2000, at second board in the 34th Chess Olympiad (women) in Istanbul (+2, =6, -3),
- In 2002, at second board in the 35th Chess Olympiad (women) in Bled (+4, =4, -4),
- In 2004, at second board in the 36th Chess Olympiad (women) in Calvià (+3, =4, -3),
- In 2006, at second board in the 37th Chess Olympiad (women) in Turin (+5, =4, -2).

She played for Croatia in the European Women's Team Chess Championships:

- In 1992, at first board in the 1st European Team Chess Championship (women) in Debrecen (+2, =1, -4),
- In 1999, at second board in the 3rd European Team Chess Championship (women) in Batumi (+3, =0, -3),
- In 2001, at second board in the 4th European Team Chess Championship (women) in León (+2, =2, -2),
- In 2003, at first reserve board in the 5th European Team Chess Championship (women) in Plovdiv (+1, =0, -2),
- In 2005, at third board in the 6th European Team Chess Championship (women) in Gothenburg (+3, =3, -2).

In 2003 in Saint-Vincent Vlasta Maček won European Senior Chess Championship. In next year she won bronze medal in this tournament.

Maček died on 8 September 2026, at the age of 74.
