= Lidija Timofejeva =

Serbian chess player

Personal information
- Born: 1906 Serbia
- Died: 1991 (aged 84–85) Zemun, SR Serbia, Yugoslavia

Chess career
- Country: Yugoslavia

Lidija Timofejeva (Serbian: Лидија Тимофејева; 1906 – 1991) was a Serbian chess player of Russian origin. She won the Yugoslav Women's Chess Championship three times in a row (1947, 1948, 1949).

== Biography ==
From the end of 1940s to the early 1960s Lidija Timofejeva was one of the leading Yugoslav women's chess players. She has repeatedly participated in Yugoslav Women's Chess Championship, where she three times in row won champions title: 1947, 1948, and 1949. In 1957, Lidija Timofejeva played for Yugoslavia at first board in the 1st Chess Olympiad (women) in Emmen. She achieved almost 50% of the result (+4, =5, -5), but caused the only loss to the Soviet Union chess teams who won the tournament, winning the Women's world chess champion Olga Rubtsova. In 1959, in Amsterdam Lidija Timofejeva ranked 4th in International Women's Chess tournament Amsterdam Danlon.
