= Tereza Štadler =

Yugoslav chess player (1936–2001)

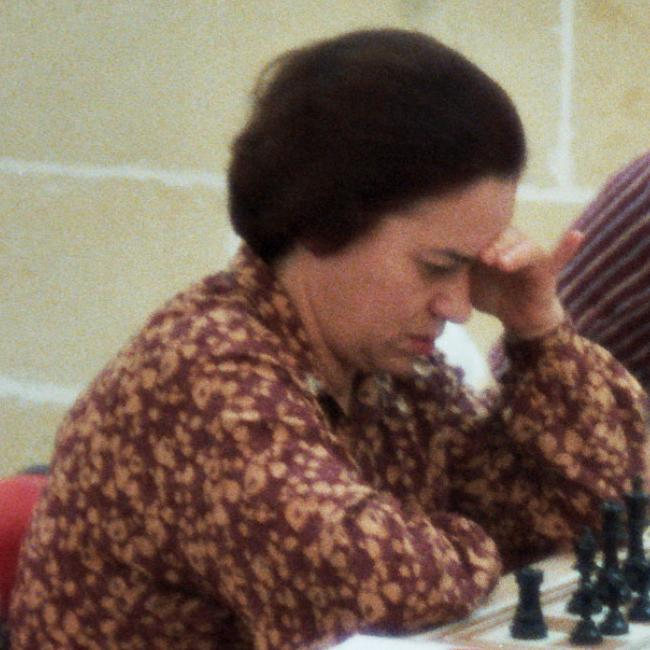
- Štadler in 1980

Personal information
- Born: 29 September 1936 Subotica, Yugoslavia
- Died: 27 March 2001 (aged 64) Subotica, Yugoslavia

Chess career
- Country: Yugoslavia
- Title: Woman Grandmaster (1977)
- Peak rating: 2250 (January 1987)

Tereza Štadler (Serbian Cyrillic: Тереза Штадлер; 29 September 1936 – 27 March 2001), née Manga, was a Yugoslav chess player who holds the title of Woman Grandmaster (WGM, 1977). She was a winner of the Yugoslav Women's Chess Championship (1964).

== Biography ==
In the 1960s, she was one of the leading Yugoslav women's chess players. Štadler won the Yugoslav Women's Chess Championships in 1964. She is the winner of many international chess women's tournaments, including Bela Crkva (1958), Arenys de Mar (1966), Novi Sad (1978).

In 1967, Tereza Štadler participated in Women's World Chess Championship Candidates Tournament in Subotica and ranked 4th place. In 1971, she participated in Women's World Chess Championship Interzonal Tournament in Ohrid and ranked 13th place.

Štadler played for Yugoslavia in the Women's Chess Olympiads:

- In 1957, at second board in the 1st Chess Olympiad (women) in Emmen (+7, =5, -2),
- In 1969, at first board in the 4th Chess Olympiad (women) in Lublin (+5, =3, -2),
- In 1980, at third board in the 9th Chess Olympiad (women) in Valletta (+6, =0, -3) and won individual bronze medal.

In 1977, she was awarded the honorary title of FIDE Woman Grandmaster (WGM).
