= Amalija Pihajlić =

Serbian chess player (born 1944)

Personal information
- Born: 4 July 1944 (age 82) Starčevo, Yugoslavia

Chess career
- Country: Yugoslavia → Serbia
- Title: Woman International Master (1977)

Amalija Pihajlić (Serbian Cyrillic: Амалија Пихајлић; born 4 July 1944) is a Serbian chess player who holds the FIDE title of Woman International Master (1977). She is a two-time winner of the Yugoslav Women's Chess Championship (1973, 1977).

== Biography ==
In the 1980s Pihajlić was one of the leading Yugoslav women's chess players. She twice won the Yugoslav Women's Championship in 1973 and 1977. In 1977, she was awarded the FIDE Woman International Master (WIM) title. In 1982, Pihajlić participated at Women's World Chess Championship Interzonal Tournament in Tbilisi and ranked 12th place.

Pihajlić played for Yugoslavia in the Women's Chess Olympiads:

- In 1978, at third board in the 8th Chess Olympiad (women) in Buenos Aires (+6, =5, -2).
