= Verica Nedeljković =

Serbian chess player (1929–2023)

- Nedeljković in 2011

Personal information
- Born: 16 September 1929 Čačak, Kingdom of Serbs, Croats, and Slovenes
- Died: 13 December 2023 (aged 94) Belgrade, Serbia

Chess career
- Country: Yugoslavia, Serbia
- Title: Woman Grandmaster (1978)
- Peak rating: 2215 (January 1990)

Verica Nedeljković (née Jovanović; Serbian: Верица Јовановић), (Serbian: Верица Недељковић; 16 September 1929 – 13 December 2023) was a Yugoslav and Serbian chess player who held the title of Woman Grandmaster (WGM, 1978). She was a six-time winner of the Yugoslav Women's Chess Championship (1950, 1951, 1952, 1953, 1958, 1965).

== Biography ==
From the mid-1950s to the late 1960s, she was one of the leading Yugoslav women's chess players. Verica Nedeljković won the Yugoslav Women's Chess Championships six times: 1950, 1951, 1952, 1953, 1958 and 1965. The winner of many international chess women's tournaments, including twice in a row in Belgrade (1961, 1962).

Verica Nedeljković four times participated in the Women's World Chess Championship Candidates Tournaments:

- In 1955, at Candidates Tournament in Moscow she took 6th place;
- In 1959, at Candidates Tournament in Plovdiv she took 2nd place;
- In 1961, at Candidates Tournament in Vrnjačka Banja shared 4th–6th place;
- In 1964, at Candidates Tournament in Sukhumi she took 9th place;
- In 1967, at Candidates Tournament in Subotica she took 6th place.

Verica Nedeljković played for Yugoslavia in the Women's Chess Olympiads:

- In 1963, at the second board in the 2nd Chess Olympiad (women) in Split (+12, =0, -0) and won the team silver medal and the gold individual medal,
- In 1966, at second board in the 3rd Chess Olympiad (women) in Oberhausen (+4, =4, -2).

In 1954, Verica Nedeljković was awarded the FIDE Woman International Master (WIM) title, but in 1978 she received the honorary title of FIDE Woman Grandmaster (WGM).

After graduation, she was a naval engineer and completed a research degree. She also worked as a lecturer at the University of Belgrade. She was married to a chess player, a chess trainer and a medical doctor by profession - Srećko Nedeljković (1923—2011).

Verica Nedeljković died in Belgrade on 13 December 2023, at the age of 94.
