= Dragoljub Velimirović =

Serbian chess grandmaster (1942–2014)

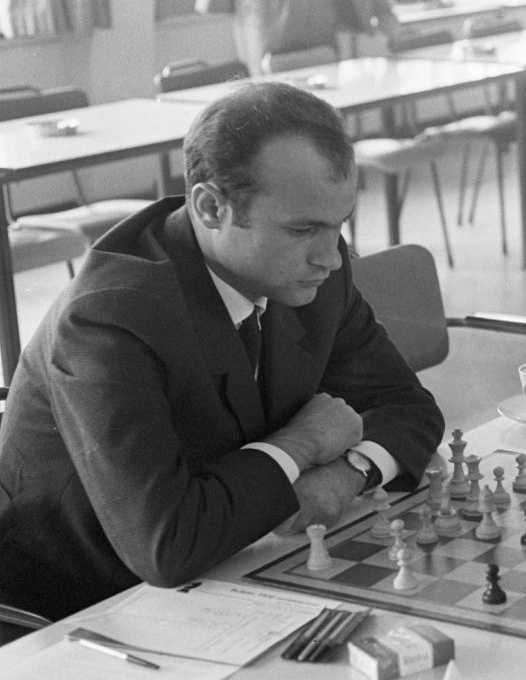
- Velimirović in 1966

Personal information
- Born: Dragoljub Velimirović; Драгољуб Велимировић; 12 May 1942 Valjevo, Yugoslavia
- Died: 22 May 2014 (aged 72) Belgrade, Serbia

Chess career
- Country: Yugoslavia → Serbia
- Title: Grandmaster (1973)
- Peak rating: 2575 (January 1986)
- Peak ranking: No. 20 (January 1986)

Dragoljub Velimirović (Serbian Cyrillic: Драгољуб Велимировић; 12 May 1942 – 22 May 2014) was a Serbian (formerly Yugoslav) chess grandmaster, born in Valjevo.

== Biography ==
Velimirović was introduced to chess at the age of seven by his mother Jovanka Velimirović (1910–1972), who was one of Yugoslavia's leading women chess players before World War II. He lived in Belgrade from 1960.

FIDE awarded him the International Master title in 1972 and Grandmaster title in 1973. He won the Yugoslav Chess Championship three times, in Vrnjacka Banja 1970 (with Milan Vukić), in Novi Sad 1975 (outright) and in Nikšić/Belgrade 1997 (also outright).

Velimirović was selected for the Yugoslav national team many times, one of the earliest occasions being for the USSR vs Yugoslavia match at Ohrid 1972, during which he notably defeated Rafael Vaganian in the first round. At the European Team Championship between 1970 and 1977 he excelled, winning a number of silver and bronze medals, both for individual and team performances. At the Chess Olympiad in Nice 1974, he took two silver medals (one team, one individual). A further silver medal followed from his participation at the World Team championship in Lucerne 1989.

In World Championship cycles, he was the winner of Zonal tournaments in Praia da Rocha 1978 and Budva 1981. He participated at three Interzonal tournaments in Rio de Janeiro 1979, Moscow 1982 and in Szirák 1987, but was never able to qualify for the Candidates phase.

Velimirović was noted for his attacking style of play and possessed a great gift for visualizing sacrificial possibilities. Whilst spectacular chess made him popular with onlookers, each game required a great effort and this may have limited his international tournament success. His early tournament results included Skopje 1971 (2nd=, behind Lev Polugaevsky, equal with Albin Planinc), Vrnjacka Banja 1973 (1st) and Novi Sad 1976 (2nd, behind Jan Smejkal, ahead of Vlastimil Hort and Svetozar Gligorić). He sustained the effort into the 1980s and early 1990s, adding further successes at Zemun 1980 (1st=, with Milan Vukić), Titograd (40th anniv Liberation of the city) 1984 (1st=, with Viktor Korchnoi, and ahead of Mikhail Tal), Vršac 1985 (1st), Vršac 1987 (1st=, with Jaan Ehlvest), Metz Open 1988 (1st) and Niksic 1994 (1st).

== Theory ==
In chess opening theory, there is a sharp and popular variation of the Sicilian Defence called the Velimirović Attack, which is identified by the sequence of moves: 1.e4 c5 2.Nf3 d6 3.d4 cxd4 4.Nxd4 Nf6 5.Nc3 Nc6 6.Bc4 e6 7.Be3 Be7 8.Qe2, intending 9.0-0-0. It is like the Yugoslav Attack, but not quite as powerful or risky because Black's bishop is not on the long diagonal.

== Death and eulogies ==
Velimirović died on May 22, 2014, at the age of 73 in Belgrade after a prolonged illness. He was survived by his wife Mirjana Velimirović and his daughter Ana Velimirovic-Zorica. There was a commemoration ceremony in Velimirović's honour on May 26, 2014, at 11:00 a.m. at the Serbian Chess Federation. Velimirovic was cremated on May 26, 2014, and the burial was at the New Cemetery, Belgrade.

== Notable games ==
- Dragoljub Velimirovic vs. Jovan Sofrevski, Yugoslav Championship 1965, Sicilian Defence, Velimirovic Attack (B89), 1–0. White sacrifices a knight as early as move 14, in order to initiate a swift attack against the enemy king.
- Dragoljub Velimirovic vs. Ljubomir Ljubojević, Yugoslav Championship 1972, Sicilian Defence, Najdorf Variation (B99), 1–0. White deviates from the common theoretical continuation (12.Qg3) with a speculative knight sacrifice. His opponent, a world-class player, fails to find the most accurate defence and further sacrificial tactics ensue.

== See also ==
- Borislav Kostić
- Svetozar Gligorić
