= Milan Vukić =

Bosnian chess grandmaster (born 1942)

Personal information
- Born: August 19, 1942 (age 83) Sanski Most, Independent State of Croatia

Chess career
- Country: Bosnia and Herzegovina
- Title: Grandmaster (1975)
- Peak rating: 2517 (January 2007)

Milan Vukić (born 19 August 1942) is a Bosnian Serb chess Grandmaster. He has been a champion of Bosnia and Herzegovina and of the former state of Yugoslavia, both during its constitution as a Socialist Federal Republic (SFRY) and as a Federal Republic (FRY).

Vukić was born in Sanski Most.

== Biography ==
Vukic only started to play chess as a young man, having been occupied with other sports during his teenage years. Once hooked on the game, his progress was rapid.

Earning the title International Master in 1967 and Grandmaster in 1975, he first won the Yugoslav Chess Championship (SFRY) in 1970 and added further victories in 1971 and 1974.

In the midst of the Balkan war hostilities (1992–1995), it was not uncommon for passionate chess players, like Vukić, to ignore the dangers and carry on playing in scheduled competitions. A fourth (this time FRY) championship win came his way in 1994. Later, after his country had endured yet more political upheaval, he won the first ever Championship of Bosnia and Herzegovina (2005). Organisers ensured this tournament comprised a mix of Serbian and Bosnian players in the spirit of friendship. Vukić was himself a registered Serbian player at the time, but has since switched Federations.

A regular on the international tournament circuit of the 1970s, he enjoyed considerable success. Notably, there were outright or shared first places at the Biel Open 1972 and 1973 (the latter shared with Janos Flesch), at the inaugural Banja Luka tournament 1974 (ahead of Vlastimil Hort and Gennady Kuzmin, other notable players included Jan Timman, Borislav Ivkov, István Csom, James Tarjan) - maybe his biggest success, and at Bajmok, Varna (both 1975), Vukovar 1976 and Zemun 1980 (shared with Dragoljub Velimirović).

Since then, he has remained fairly active as a tournament player and continues to record the occasional win, such as his shared first place at Hotel Opatija (Rijeka) in 2002.

In team chess he has represented Yugoslavia at student and full national level. Commencing with the World Student Team Championships of 1967 and 1968, he contributed solid plus scores, but the team failed to excel. At the European Team Chess Championship, he played in 1970 and in 1980, taking home an individual bronze medal on the second outing. He was part of the Bosnia & Herzegovina Euro team in 2007, but played only one game. Surprisingly for a multiple national champion, he has never represented his country at the Olympiad.

As a player of regular league chess, Vukić has had a long affiliation with the club Željezničar Sarajevo and was a team member at the finals of European Club Cup. He was also a practitioner of blitz chess.

== Notable games ==
- GM Jan Timman - GM Milan Vukić

Banja Luka 1974
1.e4 c6 2.d4 d5 3.e5 Bf5 4.h4 h5 5.Ne2 e6 6.Ng3 Bg6 7.Be2 c5 8.dxc5 Bxc5 9.Nc3 Nc6 10.Bg5 Be7 11.Qd2 Nb4 12.Bd1 Rc8 13.a3 Nc6 14.Bxe7 Ngxe7 15.f4 a6 16.Be2 Na5 17.Rc1 Nf5 18.Nxf5 Bxf5 19.Qd4 Nc4 20.Nd1 Qa5+ 21.c3 g6 22.Kf2 b5 23.Re1 Qd8 24.Rh1 Na5 25.Qb4 Qb6+ 26.Ke1 Nc6 27.Qb3 Nd4 28.Qa2 Nxe2 29.Kxe2 Bg4+ 30.Kd3 Rc4 31.g3 Bxd1 32.Rhxd1 Qf2 33.Rg1 Re4 34.Rcf1 Qe2+ 0-1

- GM Milan Vukić - GM Gyula Sax

Banja Luka 1981
1.d4 Nf6 2.c4 e6 3.Nf3 d5 4.g3 dxc4 5.Bg2 c5 6.O-O Nc6 7.Ne5 Bd7 8.Nxc6 Bxc6 9.Bxc6+ bxc6 10.Qa4 cxd4 11.Qxc6+ Nd7 12.Qxc4 Bc5 13.b4 Bb6 14.a4 O-O 15.Bb2 e5 16.Nd2 a5 17.b5 Rc8 18.Qd3 Nc5 19.Qc4 d3 20.Ba3 Re8 21.Ne4 Nxe4 22.Qxe4 d2 23.Rfd1 Bd4 24.Rab1 Bb6 25.Rb3 f5 26.Qxf5 e4 27.e3 Rc2 28.Kg2 Qc7 29.Rb2 Rc3 30.Rbxd2 Rxa3 31.Rd7 Qe5 32.Qf7+ Kh8 33.R1d5 1-0

- GM Milan Vukić - GM Vlastimil Jansa

Bor 1985
1.d4 Nf6 2.c4 g6 3.Nf3 Bg7 4.g3 O-O 5.Bg2 d5 6.cxd5 Nxd5 7.O-O Nb6 8.Nc3 Nc6 9.e3 e5 10.d5 Ne7 11.e4 Bg4 12.h3 Bxf3 13.Qxf3 c6 14.Rd1 cxd5 15.Nxd5 Nbxd5 16.exd5 Nf5 17.d6 Rb8 18.d7 Nd4 19.Qd5 Qe7 20.h4 Rfd8 21.Bh3 Kh8 22.Rxd4 exd4 23.Bf4 f5 24.Bxb8 Rxb8 25.Rc1 Rd8 26.Rc8 Bf6 27.Bf1 Kg7 28.Rxd8 Qxd8 29.Qxb7 a5 30.a4 Kh6 31.Bd3 f4 32.Kg2 fxg3 33.fxg3 Qe7 34.b4 axb4 35.a5 b3 36.a6 Qe3 37.Qf3 1-0

- GM Milan Vukić - GM Igor Miladinović

Tivat Yug-ch 1994
1.Nf3 Nf6 2.g3 b5 3.c3 Bb7 4.a4 e5 5.axb5 e4 6.Nd4 h5 7.Bg2 h4 8.d3 h3 9.Bxe4 Nxe4 10.dxe4 Bxe4 11.f3 Bb7 12.e4 a6 13.Be3 axb5 14.Rxa8 Bxa8 15.Nxb5 Be7 16.c4 O-O 17.N1c3 Na6 18.O-O f5 19.Nd4 fxe4 20.Nxe4 Nc5 21.Nf2 Bg5 22.Qd2 Bxe3 23.Qxe3 Qb8 24.Nxh3 Qxb2 25.Ng5 Qb6 26.h4 d5 27.cxd5 Bxd5 28.Re1 Nd7 29.Kh2 Nf6 30.Nf5 Qxe3 31.Rxe3 Bf7 32.Re7 Nd5 33.Rd7 c6 34.g4 Nf6 35.Rc7 Nh7 36.Ne7+ 1-0
