= Predrag Ostojić =

Yugoslav chess grandmaster (1938–1996)

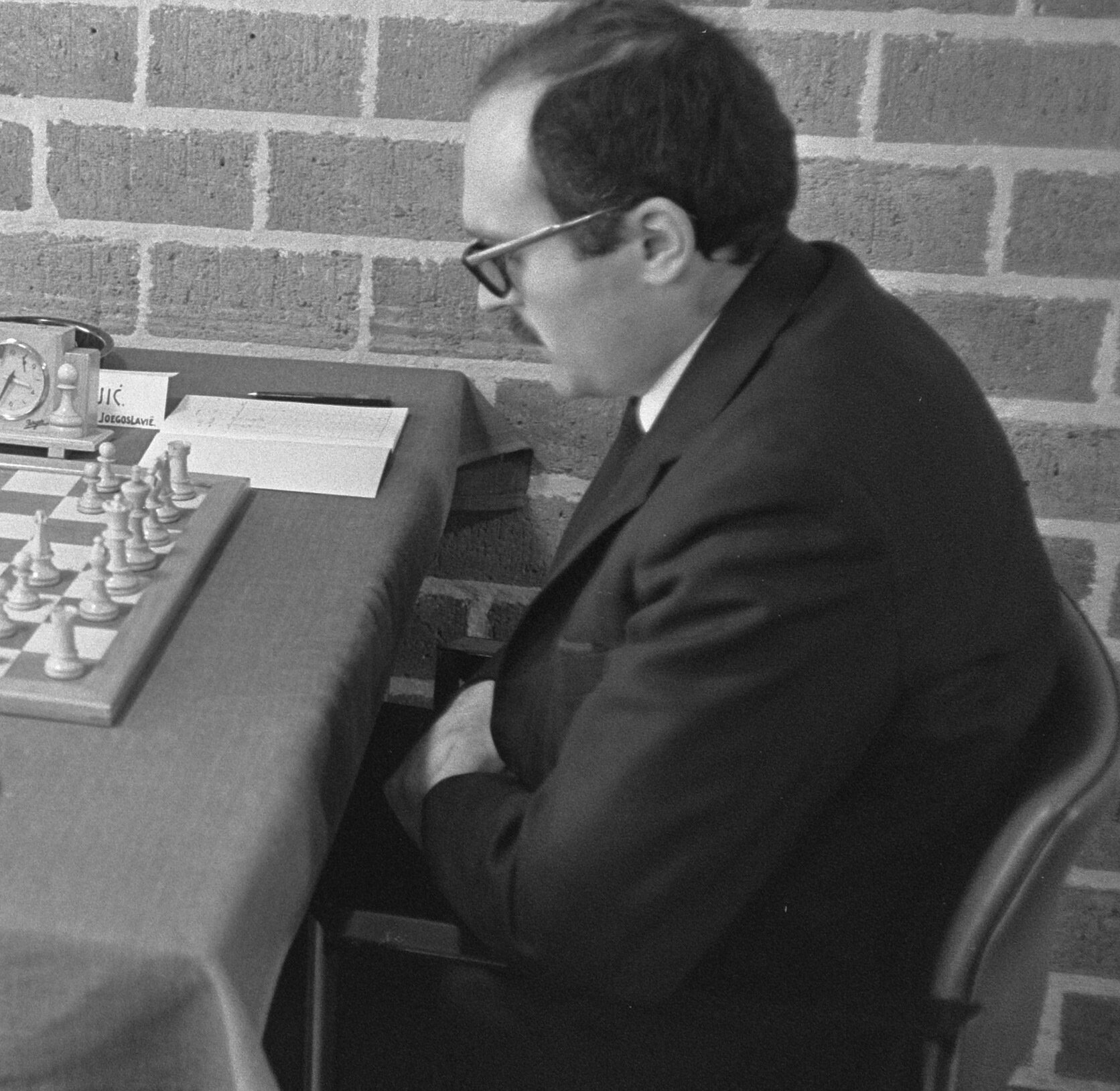
- Ostojić in 1969

Personal information
- Born: 22 February 1938 Kraljevo, Yugoslavia
- Died: 5 July 1996 (aged 58) Mainz, Germany

Chess career
- Country: Yugoslavia
- Title: Grandmaster (1975)
- Peak rating: 2495 (January 1976)
- Peak ranking: No. 85 (January 1976)

Predrag Ostojić (Serbian: Предраг Остојић; 22 February 1938 – 5 July 1996) was a Yugoslav chess player. Born in Kraljevo, he won the Yugoslav Chess Championship in 1968 and 1971. FIDE awarded Ostojić the title of International Master in 1968, and Grandmaster in 1975.

== Biography ==
Tournament victories include equal 1st place at Vrnjačka Banja 1975, 1st at Paris 1968, 1969 and 1970, San Juan 1971, Casablanca 1974, Hasselt 1974. Second places include Beverwijk 1968, Olot 1974, and Cleveland 1975. His 5-year best rating was 2480, according to Arpad Elo.

In the 80s, Ostojić rarely played in tournaments and switched to journalism and refereeing, becoming an international referee. When the creation of the International Association of Grandmasters was announced in Brussels (1987), Ostojić, on behalf of the Yugoslav chess players, offered Bobby Fischer the position of honorary chairman of the board, because he “was not only a brilliant chess player, but also a pioneer in the creation of professional chess.” Ostojić hoped to invite the American to act as a World Cup commentator, but all his initiatives remained unanswered.

After the collapse of Yugoslavia and civil wars between the peoples of the formerly united country, he began to suffer from depression, which he fought with trips to the casino. On May 5, 1996, having lost everything, the grandmaster jumped out of a hotel window in Mainz.
