= Marija Petrović (chess player) =

Serbian chess player (born 1953)

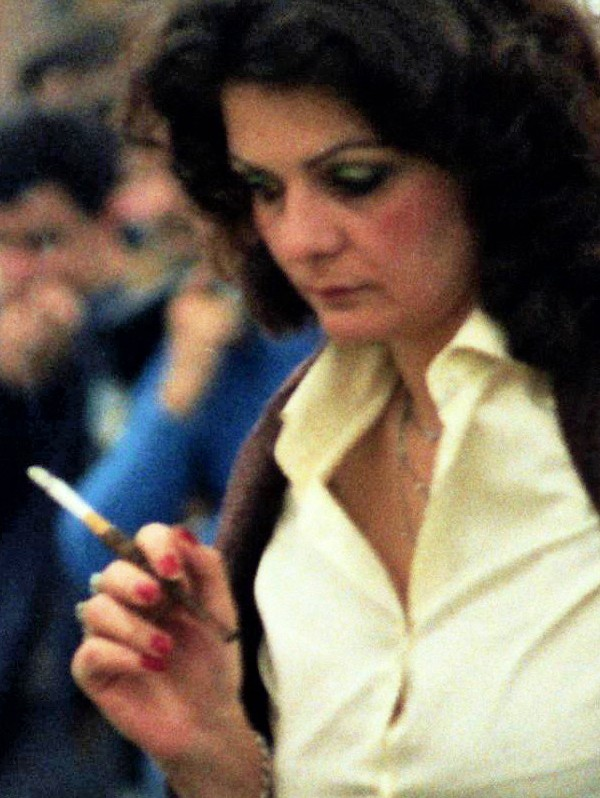
- Petrović in 1984

Personal information
- Born: 29 August 1953 (age 72) Yugoslavia

Chess career
- Country: Yugoslavia → Serbia
- Title: International Master (1981)
- FIDE rating: 1987 (October 2021)
- Peak rating: 2305 (January 1989)

Marija Petrović (born 29 August 1953) is a female chess player who has represented both Yugoslavia and Serbia in international chess championships. She represented Yugoslavia in international chess competitions from 1981 to 1992 until the breakup of Yugoslavia and then went on to represent Serbia at the international level from 1992 until her retirement in 2016. She achieved the Woman International Master title in 1981. Marija is also a two time national champion for Yugoslavia in 1983 and 1984 in the Yugoslav Chess Championship. She won her first Yugoslav Chess Championship national title jointly with her fellow counterpart Suzana Maksimović. She also represented Yugoslavia at the Women's World Chess Championship 1988 and took part in two Olympiad events in 1984 and 1990.

== See also ==
- List of female chess players
