= Tomislav Rakić =

Serbian chess player (born 1934)

Personal information
- Born: 11 November 1934 (age 91)

Chess career
- Country: Yugoslavia; Serbia
- Title: International Master (1978)
- Peak rating: 2460 (January 1982)

Tomislav Rakić (Serbian: Томислав Ракић; born 11 November 1934) is a Serbian chess International Master (IM, 1978). He is European Team Chess Championship silver medalist (1957).

== Biography ==
According to the retrospective system Chessmetrics, Tomislav Rakić was the highest ranked in 1969 and 1970, then he was ranked 96th in the world.

Tomislav Rakić played for Yugoslavia in the European Team Chess Championship:

- In 1957, at second reserve board in the 1st European Team Chess Championship in Vienna (+1, =2, -0) and won team silver medal.

Tomislav Rakić played for Yugoslavia in the World Student Team Chess Championships:

- In 1960, at third board in the 7th World Student Team Chess Championship in Leningrad (+8, =2, -3) and won team bronze medal.
