= Jordanka Belić =

Serbian chess player (born 1964)

- Jordanka Belić in 1997

Personal information
- Born: 12 January 1964 (age 62) Budoželja, Serbia

Chess career
- Country: Yugoslavia (until 1992); Germany (1992-2009); Serbia (from 2009)
- Title: Woman Grandmaster (2000)
- Peak rating: 2389 (July 2002)

Jordanka Belić (Serbian: Јорданка Белић; née Mičić, born 12 January 1964) is a Serbian and German chess Woman grandmaster (WGM, 2000) who won Yugoslav Women's Chess Championship and Open German Women's Championship in 1990.

== Chess career ==
From July 1992 to January 2009 she played for the German Chess Federation, in mid-January 2009 she switched to the Serbian Chess Federation. She has held the title of Woman grandmaster (WGM) since 2000.

Jordanka Belić took part in women's Chess Olympiad four times, once for Yugoslavia (1990) and three times for Germany (1994, 1996 and 2002), she also played with the German Women's Chess team in 2003 at the European Women's Team Chess Championship.

She played in the 1st Chess Women's Bundesliga in the 1991/92 season for SC Bessenbach, from 1992 to 1995 and from 1997 to 2000 for the Elberfelder Schachgesellschaft 1851, in the 1995/96 season for SG Bochum 31, from 2000 to 2004 for SK Turm Emsdetten, in the 2005/06 season for SV Walldorf and from 2009 to 2015 for USV Volksbank Halle. She won the Chess Women's Bundesliga 1993, 1994, 1998, 1999, 2001 and 2010.

She took part in the European Women's Chess Club Cup in 1997 and 1998 with the Elberfelder Schachgesellschaft 1851, in 2000 with the SK Turm Emsdetten and in 2010 with the USV Volksbank Halle, where she achieved the second-best result on the second board in 2000.

In 1990 she won the Yugoslav Women's Chess Championship and in Bad Neustadt an der Saale the Open German Women's Championship. Between 1990 and 2002, Belić was among the 100 strongest female chess players in the world.
