= Božidar Ivanović =

Montenegrin chess grandmaster (born 1946)

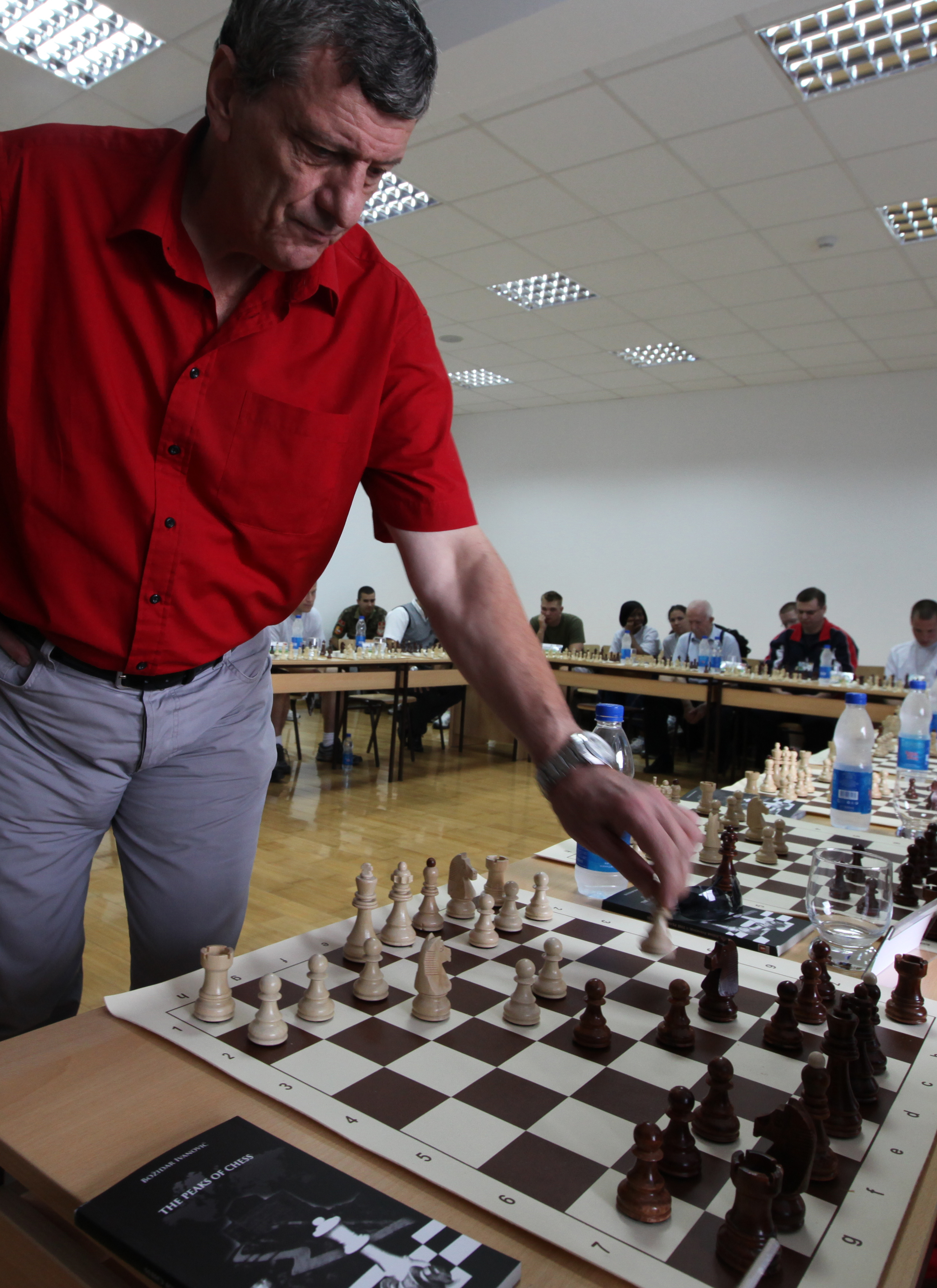
- Božidar Ivanović, 2010

Personal information
- Born: August 24, 1946 (age 79) Cetinje, Yugoslavia

Chess career
- Country: Montenegro
- Title: Grandmaster (1978)
- Peak rating: 2550 (July 1981)

Božidar Ivanović (Montenegrin Cyrillic: Божидар Ивановић; born 24 August 1946) is a Montenegrin chess grandmaster, politician, and chess official. He has served as Minister of Sport and Tourism in Montenegro. He won the Yugoslav Chess Championship twice, in 1973 and 1981. He also won the championship of the Federal Republic of Yugoslavia in 1996. His FIDE rating is 2444 as of January 2008.

== Biography ==
Ivanović was born in Cetinje, Montenegro, then Yugoslavia. He earned his International Master title in 1976, and was promoted to Grandmaster in 1977.

He represented Yugoslavia once at the World U26 Olympiad, four times at chess Olympiads, once at the European Team Championship, and once at the World Team Championship. He then represented Montenegro at the 2007 European Team Championship. His full international team results follow.

- Graz 1972, Under 26 Olympiad, Yugoslavia board 3, +10 -1 -1, board gold.
- Valletta 1980 Olympiad, Yugoslavia 1st reserve, +0 =4 -2, team 4th.
- Plovdiv 1983, Euroteams, Yugoslavia board 8, +3 =4 -0, team silver.
- Thessaloniki 1984 Olympiad, Yugoslavia 1st reserve, +2 =3 -2.
- Lucerne 1989, World Team Championship, Yugoslavia 1st reserve, +0 =2 -1, team silver.
- Novi Sad 1990 Olympiad, Yugoslavia 2nd team, board 3, +4 =4 -1.
- Yerevan 1996 Olympiad, Yugoslavia board 1, +1 =8 -2.
- Heraklio 2007, Euroteams, Montenegro board 2, +0 =2 -1.

For most of his career, Ivanović competed mainly in Yugoslavia and the Balkans region, with occasional forays into North America and western Europe. He made his debut in the Yugoslav Chess Championship finals in 1968, but struggled that year. He made an even score in the championship the next year, 9.5/19. Besides his four titles, he made strong results in 1977 at Zagreb with 8.5/13 for a shared 3-5th place, and in 1991 at Banja Vrujci with 8.5/13 for a shared 4-7th place.

Ivanović won the traditional Canadian Open Chess Championship at Toronto in 1983, alongside Kevin Spraggett. Other best international-level results included: shared 2nd-3rd at Eksjö A 1980 with 7/11, shared 1st-3rd at Venice Lido Open 1980 with 6/8, 4th at the Budva Zonal tournament with 12/19 (but did not advance), shared 3rd-5th at Vinkovci 1982 with 8/13, shared 4-6th at Vršac 1983 with 8/13, shared 3rd-8th at the 1988 New York Open with 6/9, advanced from the 1990 Nea Makri Zonal with 9.5/15, 6.5/13 at the 1990 Manila Interzonal for a middle of the field placing, shared 4-9th at Kladovo 1992 with 8/13, and 2nd at Niksic 1994 with 7/11.

== Later years ==
He served as Chairman of Montenegro's Chess Association. He served as state Minister of Sport and Tourism for Montenegro. He served as a member of the Appeals' Committee for the 2007 World Chess Championship.
