= Suzana Maksimović =

Serbian chess player (born 1962)

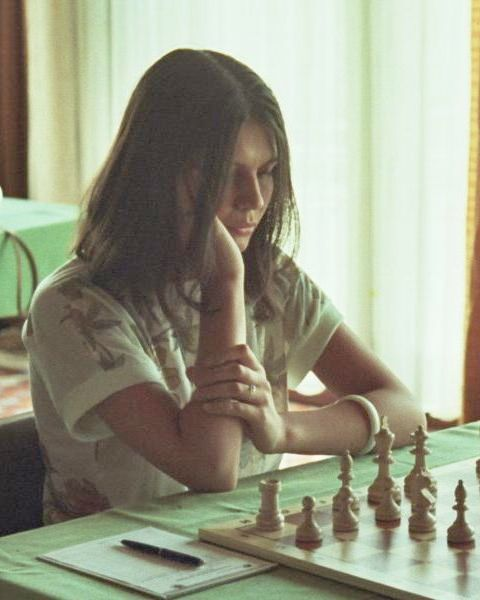
- Maksimović in 1982

Personal information
- Born: 5 January 1962 (age 64)

Chess career
- Country: Yugoslavia → Serbia
- Title: Woman Grandmaster (1999)
- FIDE rating: 2145 (October 2021)
- Peak rating: 2345 (July 1987)

Suzana Maksimović (Serbian: Сузана Максимовић; born 5 January 1962) is a Serbian and Yugoslav chess player who holds the title of Woman Grandmaster. She is a two-time winner of the Yugoslav Women's Chess Championship (1983, 1991). She won her first Yugoslav Chess Championship national title in 1983 jointly with her fellow counterpart Marija Petrović.

== Biography ==
Maksimović had her first major success in 1980 when she won the title of European Junior Chess vice champion in the U20 age group. In the 1980s, she was one of the leading Yugoslav women's chess players. Suzana Maksimović won the Yugoslav Women's Chess Championships two times: 1983 and 1991 - together with Mirjana Marić. In 2002, she won the silver medal in the Yugoslav Women's Chess Championship, and in 2006 repeated this success in the Serbian Women's Chess Championship. In 1990 in Pula, Suzana Maksimović shared the 1st-4th in the Women's World Chess Championship Zonal Tournament. In 1996 in Dresden, she won the International Women's Chess Tournament.

She participated four times in the Women's World Chess Championship Interzonal Tournaments:

- In 1982, at Interzonal Tournament in Bad Kissingen shared 8th-10th place;
- In 1987, at Interzonal Tournament in Tuzla shared 11th-12th place;
- In 1991, at Interzonal Tournament in Subotica has taken 29th place;
- In 1995, at Interzonal Tournament in Chişinău has taken 24th place.

Maksimović played for Yugoslavia and Serbia in the Women's Chess Olympiads:

- In 1982, at third board in the 10th Chess Olympiad (women) in Lucerne (+5, =4, -3),
- In 1984, at third board in the 26th Chess Olympiad (women) in Thessaloniki (+5, =2, -4),
- In 1986, at third board in the 27th Chess Olympiad (women) in Dubai (+8, =2, -2) and won the individual bronze medal,
- In 1988, at third board in the 28th Chess Olympiad (women) in Thessaloniki (+3, =5, -2) and won the team bronze medal,
- In 1990, at third board in the 29th Chess Olympiad (women) in Novi Sad (+1, =3, -2).
- In 1994, at first reserve board in the 31st Chess Olympiad (women) in Moscow (+0, =1, -3),
- In 2006, at third board in the 37th Chess Olympiad (women) in Turin (+2, =3, -2).

She received the FIDE title of Woman International Master (WIM) in 1982 and Woman Grandmaster (WGM) in 1999.
