= Andrija Fuderer =

Yugoslavian chess player (1931–2011)

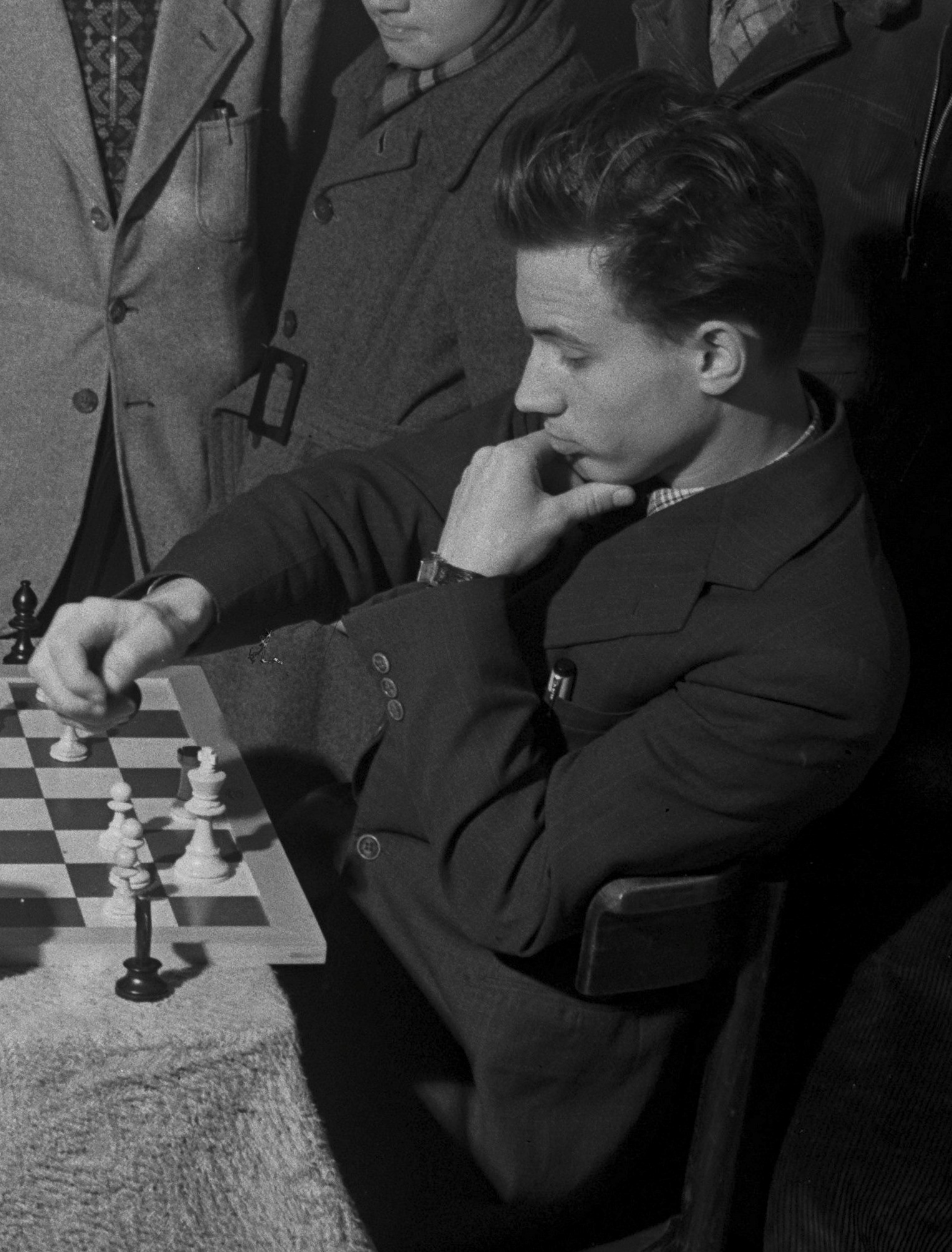
- Fuderer (1952)

Personal information
- Born: Andrija Fuderer; 13 May 1931 Subotica, Serbia
- Died: 2 October 2011 (aged 80) Palamós, Spain

Chess career
- Country: Croatia; Belgium
- Title: International Master (1952); Honorary Grandmaster (1990)

Andrija Fuderer (13 May 1931, Subotica, Yugoslavia – 2 October 2011, Palamós, Spain) was a Yugoslavian chess master.

At the beginning of his career, he won the Yugoslav Junior Chess Championship in 1947. He was the Croatian champion in 1951 and 1958, and was a common participant in the Yugoslav Chess Championship tying for 2nd in 1951 (Braslav Rabar won), took 2nd, behind Petar Trifunović, in 1952, and won (jointly) in 1953.

In other tournaments, he took 4th at Bled 1950 (Miguel Najdorf won), shared 2nd, behind Albéric O'Kelly de Galway, at Dortmund 1951, took 5th at Beverwijk 1952 (Max Euwe won). He won at Saarbrücken 1953, took 2nd at Opatija (Abbazia) 1953 (Aleksandar Matanović won), took 4th at Munich 1954 (zonal, Wolfgang Unzicker won), tied for 3rd-5th at Hastings 1954/55 (Paul Keres and Vasily Smyslov won).

His most notable tournament was the 1955 Interzonal, which he qualified for by his 1954 zonal result. At the Interzonal he scored 9/20, finishing in a tie for 14th-15th out of 21 players.

After the 1955 Interzonal, Fuderer left chess for a university career in chemistry. He earned a PhD degree from the University of Zagreb, and was also an inventor.

Fuderer played thrice for Yugoslavia in Chess Olympiads:

- In 1952 in Helsinki (+2 –0 =3), won team bronze medal;
- In 1954 in Amsterdam (+6 –1 =5), team bronze and individual silver medals;
- In 1958 in Munich (+8 –2 =1), team silver and individual bronze medals.

He also played in the 1st European Team Chess Championship at Vienna 1957, and won team silver medal.

Awarded the International Master title in 1952, and an honorary Grandmaster title in 1990.
