= Milan Vidmar Jr. =

Slovenian chess player

Milan Vidmar Jr. (16 December 1909, Weiz – 10 November 1980, Ljubljana) was a Slovenian-Yugoslavian chess master.

He was a son of Milan Vidmar, a leading Slovenian chess grandmaster.

In 1938, he tied for 9th–10th in Ljubljana (Boris Kostić won, and Milan Vidmar sr shared 5th place). In 1942, he shared 1st with Efim Bogoljubow in Cottbus. He tied for 2nd–3rd with his father, behind Svetozar Gligorić, at Ljubljana (Liberation) 1945/46, took 6th at Karlovy Vary / Mariánské Lázně 1948 (Jan Foltys won), shared 8th at Vienna 1951 (4th Schlechter Memorial, Moshe Czerniak won), and took 10th at Opatija 1953 (Aleksandar Matanović won).

Vidmar Jr. played for Yugoslavia at first reserve board (+4 –0 =2) in the 9th Chess Olympiad at Dubrovnik 1950. He won team gold medal.

He was awarded the IM title in 1950.
