= Srećko Nedeljković =

Serbian chess player (1923–2011)

Personal information
- Born: 4 December 1923 Dragočevo, Kingdom of Serbs, Croats, and Slovenes
- Died: 2 January 2011 (aged 87) Belgrade, Serbia
- Education: University of Belgrade

Chess career
- Country: Yugoslavia; Serbia
- Title: International Master (1951)

Srećko Nedeljković (Serbian: Срећко Недељковић; 4 December 1923 – 2 January 2011) was a Serbian cardiologist and chess International Master (IM, 1951). He was a two-time silver medalist at the European Team Chess Championship (1957 and 1961).

== Chess career ==
Srećko Nedeljković learned the game of chess at the age of 13, and his first teacher was his older brother. After World War II he moved to Belgrade, achieving his first chess success in 1946, in the form of 2nd place in the championship of Yugoslav People's Army. Nedeljković received the title of National master for his results in the individual finals of the Yugoslav Chess Championship in 1949 and 1950, while the title of International Master FIDE was awarded to him for winning the International Chess tournament in Belgrade in 1951. In 1952 Nedeljković took 2nd place (behind Arthur Bisguier) in Vienna. At that time, he was already among the top national players, representing the colors of Yugoslavia in many international matches. In 1957, he took the 6th place in the final of the national chess championship and played in the European Team Chess Championship held in Vienna, winning a silver medal. In 1959, he shared the second place (behind Borislav Ivkov, together with Nikola Karaklajić and Sava Vuković) in Belgrade, and in 1961 for the second time in his career, he played for Yugoslavia in the European Team Chess Championship in Oberhausen, again winning the silver medal. During this period, Nedeljković ended his chess career, devoting himself to professional work.

According to the retrospective system Chessmetrics, he was the highest ranked in September 1957, then he was ranked 55th in the world.

Srećko Nedeljković was associated with the Yugoslav national team for 30 years as a player, coach and captain. The Yugoslav players trained by him won gold medals in Chess Olympiad in 1950 in Dubrovnik. He captained the national team at the Olympics in Moscow (1956), Havana (1966) and Buenos Aires (1978), as well as the European Team Chess Championships in Skara (1980).

In 1947, Srećko Nedeljković was the founder of the Crvena Zvezda chess club in Belgrade, of which he was a lifelong member.

The Srećko Nedeljković family is known for its chess achievements. His wife, Verica Nedeljković (née Jovanović), from the mid-1950s to the end of the 1960s was classified in the top ten in the world, including participating in Women's World Chess Championship Candidates Tournament five times. She was also a two-time Yugoslav chess olympian and a six-time Yugoslavian women's chess champion. For her achievements in 1977 she received the honorary title of Women's Grandmaster (WGM). Two sons, as well as a grandson, reached the level of candidates for master.

== Medical career ==
Srećko Nedeljković also noted significant achievements in his medical works. In 1952 he received his medical degree from the University of Belgrade Faculty of Medicine. For the following years, he worked as a physician at the University of Belgrade. In 1959 he received the title of professor. For thirty years (1959–1989) he managed the Institute of Cardiovascular Diseases, of which he was one of the founders. He has collaborated with the world-renowned cardiac surgeon Michael DeBakey. The legacy of Srećko Nedeljkovic includes 8 books, 212 scientific articles and 136 other documents related to medicine.
