= Borislav Milić =

Yugoslav chess grandmaster and writer (1925–1986)

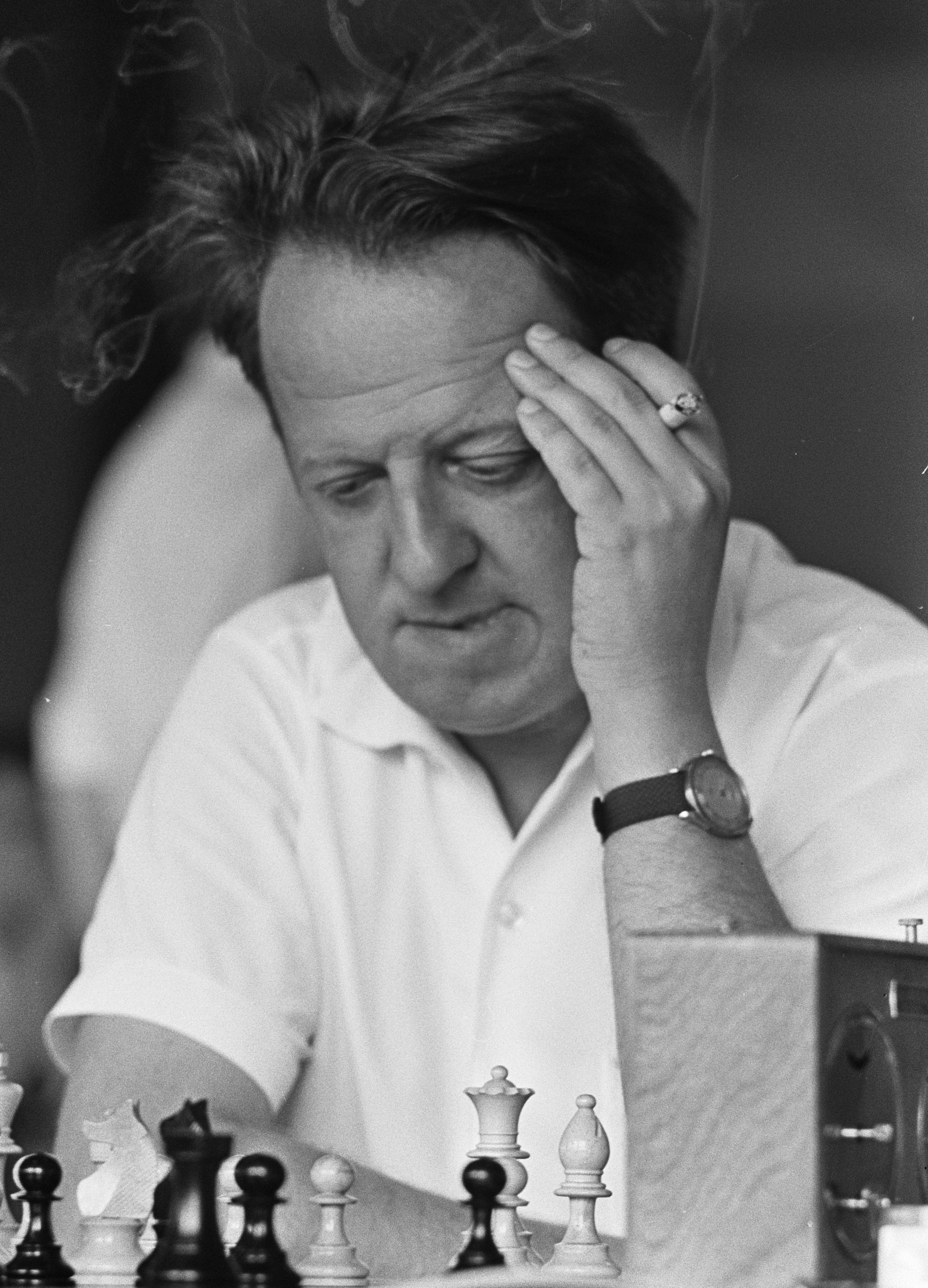
- Milić in 1965

Personal information
- Born: 20 October 1925 Belgrade
- Died: 28 May 1986 (aged 60)

Chess career
- Country: Yugoslavia
- Title: Honorary Grandmaster (1977); International Master (1952)

Borislav Milić (Cyrillic: Борислав Милић; 20 October 1925 – 28 May 1986) was a Serbian-Yugoslav Grandmaster of chess, and a chess writer, organizer, promoter, and administrator.

== Introduction ==
Born in Belgrade, Borislav Milic was part of the group of strong Yugoslav chessplayers, along with Svetozar Gligorić, Petar Trifunovic, Vasja Pirc, Aleksandar Matanović, Braslav Rabar, Andrija Fuderer, Nikola Karaklajic, and Borislav Ivkov, which attained prominence immediately after the end of World War II. Milic was active in tournament play from 1945 to 1967. He then developed a career as a chess administrator, and as a co-founder of the very successful Chess Informant publications, serving there as a senior editor and writer.

== Yugoslav Championship results ==
Milic played in 14 Yugoslav Chess Championship finals from 1945 to 1962, usually attaining good results. He was never able to win the national championship, which during that era was the second strongest in the world, behind only the Soviet Union, but he had several near-misses. Milic's best results in national championships included 4th at Novi Sad 1945 with 15/23, 5th at Belgrade 1948 with 9.5/17, shared 4–5th at Ljubljana 1951 with 10/17, shared 3rd–5th at Belgrade 1952 with 12/19, shared 4–6th at Zagreb 1953 with 10.5/17, shared 4–5th at Novi Sad 1955 with 10/17, and shared 4–7th at Kragujevac 1959 with 10/17.

== Represents Yugoslavia in team play ==
He was selected for Yugoslav national teams in matches against the Netherlands, West Germany, USA, Switzerland, Hungary, and the Soviet Union. Milic was chosen for Yugoslav chess Olympiad teams twice, and for European Championship teams twice, winning team medals on each occasion. In 27 games, he scored (+8 =18 -1), for 69 per cent. His Olympiad and Euroteams results follow.

- Helsinki 1952, Olympiad, 2nd reserve, +3 =2 -0, team bronze
- Moscow 1956, Olympiad, 1st reserve, +3 =6 -0, team silver
- Vienna 1957, Euroteams, board 8, +0 =4 -0, team silver
- Oberhausen 1961, Euroteams, board 8, +2 =6 -1, team silver.

== International highlights ==
Milic tied 2nd-4th at Vienna 1951-52. He tied 2nd–3rd at Dortmund 1951 with 7/11. He tied 2nd–3rd at Belgrade 1952 with 12.5/19, his best performance rating at 2709. He won at the traditional Beverwijk Hoogovens in 1955 with 6.5/9. He was 2nd at Ljubljana 1955 with 11/17. He won at Krynica 1956 with 9.5/13. He tied for 3rd–4th at Sarajevo 1961 with 6.5/11.

He was awarded the International Master title from FIDE, the World Chess Federation, in 1952, but had to wait until 1977, ten years after he had retired from top-class play, to receive the Grandmaster title, in recognition of his earlier strong performances.

== Chess administrator, writer ==
Milic retired from top-class play after 1967, and served as General Secretary of the Yugoslav Chess Federation. He was one of the group of pioneering originators of the Chess Informant publications. Beginning in 1966, led by Alexander Matanovic, Chess Informant systematized opening classifications, game information, and analysis to a much deeper level of sophistication, and produced volumes of annotated games from major events involving top players, using a languageless set of symbols for worldwide appeal. Their books sold well around the world, and played a vital role in the development and popularization of chess. The Chess Informant project has been called the most important in chess publication history.

Milic also worked with the New In Chess group of publications, producing articles and openings keybooks.
