= Mijo Udovčić =

Yugoslavian chess player (1920–1984)

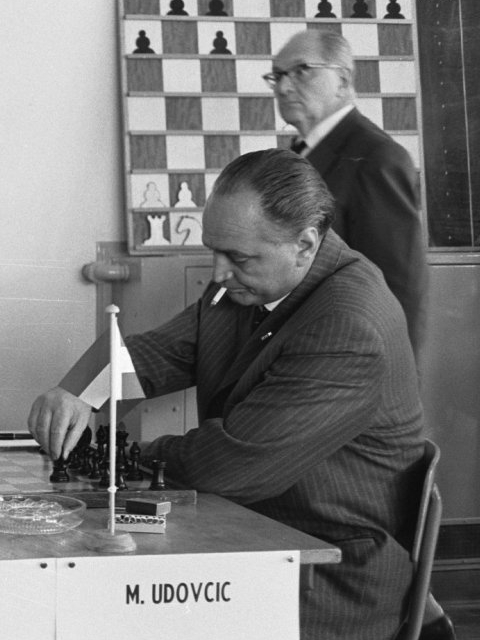
- Mijo Udovčić, Amsterdam 1963

Personal information
- Born: Mijo Udovčić; September 11, 1920 Stara Jošava, formerly Yugoslavia, now Croatia
- Died: April 8, 1984 (aged 63)

Chess career
- Country: Yugoslavia
- Title: Grandmaster
- Peak rating: 2460 (July 1971)

Mijo Udovčić (September 11, 1920 – April 8, 1984) was a Yugoslavian chess player, who became the first Croatian Grandmaster in 1962. Jointly with Borislav Ivkov, he won the Yugoslav championships in 1963.

== Background ==
Udovčić gained the title of International Master in 1957 and became a Grandmaster in 1962. He was the first Croatian player to attain the Grandmaster title.

Chessmetrics gives his highest rating at 2618 in January 1953, which places him 39th in the world at that time. As well as being a top chess player, Udovčić worked as a judge.

== Notable team results ==
Udovčić was part of the Yugoslavian team who won silver medals behind USSR at the 16th Chess Olympiad held in Tel Aviv, Israel in 1964. He played on the fifth board, scoring 5 points from 7 games.

Udovčić also played for Yugoslavia in two European Team Chess Championships, scoring 7/10 in Oberhausen in 1961 and 6/9 in Hamburg in 1965. Yugoslavia won silver medals behind USSR in both events.

== Notable individual results ==
- Ljubljana 1955: 3rd 10½/17 (winner Zdravko Gabrovšek 11½, second Borislav Milić 11)
- Dortmund 1961: 2nd= 7/11 (with Vasily Smyslov, winner Mark Taimanov 8)
- Yugoslav Championship 1961 (Zagreb): 2nd= (with Stojan Puc, winner Trifunović)
- Lasker Memorial, Berlin 1962: 2nd= 10½/15 (with Leonid Stein, winner Evgeni Vasiukov 11½)
- Yugoslav Championship 1963 (Zenica): 1st= 15/21 (with Ivkov)
- Zagreb 1969: 2nd= (with Vlastimil Hort, winner Mato Damjanović)

== Notable games ==
Position: b1 black rook, h2 white king, g2 white pawn, a2 white pawn, h3 white pawn, g4 black knight, f4 black pawn, d5 black pawn, g6 black pawn, g7 black king, f7 black pawn, e7 white knight, a7 white queen, e8 black rook

Larsen–Udovčić, position after 33 ... Ng4+!

=== Larsen, B–Udovčić, Sarajevo 1960 ===
Bird's Opening (ECO F03)

1.f4 d5 2.Nf3 Nf6 3.e3 g6 4.b4 Bg7 5.Bb2 O-O 6.Be2 Bg4 7.O-O Nbd7 8.Na3 c6 9.c4 e6 10.h3 Bxf3 11.Bxf3 Qe7 12.b5 Ne4 13.Bxg7 Kxg7 14.bxc6 bxc6 15.cxd5 cxd5 16.Nb5 Qb4 17.Rb1 Qxd2 18.Bxe4 Qxe3+ 19.Kh1 Qxe4 20.Nd6 Qe3 21.Rb7 Nf6 22.f5 Qe5 23.fxg6 hxg6 24.Qf3 Rad8 25.Nb5 a6 26.Na7 Rd7 27.Nc6 Qf5 28.Qe2 Rxb7 29.Rxf5 exf5 30.Qxa6 Rb1+ 31.Kh2 Re8 32.Qa7 f4 33.Ne7 Ng4+ 0-1

Larsen resigned as 34. hxg4 was forced, which would have been followed by 34. ... Rh8 checkmate.
