= Sava Vuković (chess player) =

Yugoslav chess player

Personal information
- Born: 20 January 1912
- Died: 28 July 1961 (aged 49)

Chess career
- Country: Yugoslavia

Sava Vuković (Serbian: Сава Вуковић; 20 January 1912 – 28 July 1961) was a Serbian origin Yugoslav chess master, Yugoslav Chess Championship bronze medalist (1939).

== Biography ==
Sava Vuković participated in several Yugoslav Chess Championships and won bronze medal in 1939. Also he won Belgrade Chess Club Championship in 1934.

Sava Vuković played for Yugoslavia in the Chess Olympiad:

- In 1937, at third board in the 7th Chess Olympiad in Stockholm (+1, =0, -7).

Sava Vuković played for Yugoslavia in the Men's Chess Balkaniads:

- In 1946, at seventh board in the 1st Men's Chess Balkaniad in Belgrade (+1, =0, -1) and won team gold and individual silver medals,
- In 1947, at first reserve board in the 2nd Men's Chess Balkaniad in Sofia (+0, =0, -1) and won team silver medal.
