= Stojan Puc =

Slovenian-Yugoslavian chess master

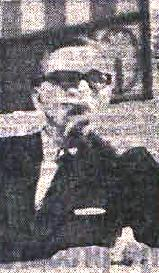
- Country: Slovenia / Yugoslavia
- Born: 9 April 1921
- Died: 29 January 2004 (aged 82)
- Title: Honorary Grandmaster (1984); International Master (1950)

Stojan Puc (9 April 1921 – 29 January 2004) was a Slovenian-Yugoslavian chess master.

He won the Slovenian Chess Championship on four occasions: (1954 (joint), 1958, 1965 (joint), and 1967).

He tied for 5-6th at Ljubljana (Liberation) 1945/46 (Svetozar Gligorić won); shared 8th at Zagreb 1946 (Yugoslav Championship, Petar Trifunović won); took 2nd at Rogaška Slatina 1948; shared 1st with Jan Foltys at Vienna 1949 (Schlechter Memorial); took 14th at Bled 1950 (Miguel Najdorf won); 5th-6th at Dortmund 1951 (Albéric O'Kelly de Galway won); took 19th at Belgrade 1952 (Hermann Pilnik won); tied for 2nd-4th at Krynica 1956 (Borislav Milić won); tied for 2nd-5th at Portorož 1957; he won the inaugural edition of the Bosna series (then an international invitation series of note) at Sarajevo in 1957 as clear first, and was first again, on better tie-break along with Luděk Pachman at Sarajevo (Bosna) 1960; tied for 7-8th at Ljubljana 1969 (1st Vidmar Memorial, Albin Planinc won) and tied for 17-18th at Ljubljana / Portorož 1973 (2nd Vidmar Memorial, Lajos Portisch won).

Puc played for Yugoslavia as second reserve (+1 -1 =0) in the 9th Chess Olympiad at Dubrovnik 1950, as the team won the gold medal.

He was awarded the International Master title in 1950, and an Honorary Grandmaster title in 1984.

The Puc Variation of the Nimzo-Indian Defense (1.d4 Nf6 2.c4 e6 3. Nc3 Bb4 4.e3 c6) is named after him.
