= Braslav Rabar =

Croatian chess player (1919–1973)

Personal information
- Born: September 27, 1919 Zagreb, Yugoslavia
- Died: December 6, 1973 (aged 54) Zagreb, Yugoslavia

Chess career
- Country: Yugoslavia
- Title: International Master (1950)

Braslav Rabar (27 September 1919, Zagreb – 6 December 1973, Zagreb) was a Croatian-Yugoslavian chess International Master (1950) and chess writer. He was Yugoslav champion in 1951, and in 1953 again tied for the tournament lead, but lost a playoff match. He played for Yugoslavia in three chess Olympiads (1950, 1952, 1954), winning a total of five medals. Rabar was a co-inventor of the classification systems for the Chess Informant publications.

== Early years ==
In 1941, he tied for 8-9th in Trentschin-Teplitz (Trencianske Teplice); the event was won by Jan Foltys. In September 1941, he tied for 9-10th in Munich (Europaturnier, Gösta Stoltz won). In December 1941, he played at second board against Ludovit Potuček (1.5 : 0.5) in a match Croatia – Slovakia in Zagreb. In September 1942, he took 12th in Munich (Europameisterschaft, 1st European Individual Chess Championship, Alexander Alekhine won). He represented the Independent State of Croatia there.

== Yugoslav champion, peak form ==
In 1945/46, he took 4th in Ljubljana; the event was won by Svetozar Gligorić. In 1949/50, he tied for 2nd-3rd, in Lucerne. In 1950, he won, ahead of Mladen Šubarić, in Zagreb (CRO-ch). In 1951, he won the 10th Yugoslav Championship in Sarajevo.

In 1953, he took 3rd in Opatija. In 1953, he tied for 1st with Vasja Pirc in Zagreb (12th YUG-ch), and afterwards lost a play-off match for the title. In 1954, he tied for 2nd-3rd with Jan Hein Donner, behind Wolfgang Unzicker, in Munich (zonal). In 1955, he tied for 14–15th in Gothenburg (Interzonal); the event was won by David Bronstein.

== Excels in team competitions ==
Rabar participated at the 1st Balkaniad in Belgrade in 1946. Yugoslavia won, ahead of Romania, Bulgaria, and Albania. He won silver medal at 8th board. Rabar played in three Chess Olympiads. In August/September 1950, he won two gold medals: individual at fourth board (+8 –0 =2), and team, along with Gligorić, Pirc, Petar Trifunović, Milan Vidmar jr, and Stojan Puc, at the 9th Chess Olympiad in Dubrovnik. In August 1952, he played at second board at the 10th Chess Olympiad in Helsinki (+5 –1 =6). Rabar won two bronze medals (individual and team). In September 1954, he played at fourth board at the 11th Chess Olympiad in Amsterdam (+1 –3 =4). Yugoslavia won bronze medal. In the three Olympiads, Rabar won five medals, and in 30 games scored (+14 -4 =12), for 66.7 per cent.

== Legacy ==
Rabar was awarded the International Master (IM) title in 1950. He coedited the monthly chess magazine Šahovski Glasnik. He was involved in designing the ECO opening classification system.
