= Yugoslav Chess Championship =

Annual chess tournament

The Yugoslav Chess Championship was an annual chess tournament held to determine the Yugoslav national champion and Yugoslavia's candidates for the World Chess Championship.

It was first played in 1935 in Belgrade, the capital of Kingdom of Yugoslavia and ended with its 46th iteration during the breakup of SFR Yugoslavia.

== Winners list (men) ==
=== Kingdom of Yugoslavia ===
| No. | Year | Location | Champion |
|---|---|---|---|
| 1 | 1935 | Belgrade | Vasja Pirc and Borislav Kostić |
| 2 | 1936 | Novi Sad | Vasja Pirc (2) |
| 3 | 1937 | Rogaška Slatina | Vasja Pirc (3) as Yugoslav champion, Miguel Najdorf as tournament champion |
| 4 | 1938 | Ljubljana | Borislav Kostić (2) |
| 5 | 1939 | Zagreb | Milan Vidmar |

=== SFR Yugoslavia ===
| No. | Year | Champion |
|---|---|---|
| 1 | 1945 | Petar Trifunović |
| 2 | 1946 | Petar Trifunović (2) |
| 3 | 1947 | Svetozar Gligorić; Petar Trifunović (3) |
| 4 | 1948 | Svetozar Gligorić (2); Vasja Pirc (4) |
| 5 | 1949 | Svetozar Gligorić (3) |
| 6 | 1950 | Svetozar Gligorić (4) |
| 7 | 1951 | Braslav Rabar |
| 8 | 1952 | Petar Trifunović (4) |
| 9 | 1953 | Vasja Pirc (5) |
| 10 | 1955 | Nikola Karaklajić |
| 11 | 1956 | Svetozar Gligorić (5) |
| 12 | 1957 | Svetozar Gligorić (6) |
| 13 | 1958 | Svetozar Gligorić (7); Borislav Ivkov |
| 14 | 1959 | Svetozar Gligorić (8) |
| 15 | 1960 | Svetozar Gligorić (9) |
| 16 | 1961 | Petar Trifunović (5) |
| 17 | 1962 | Aleksandar Matanović; Dragoljub Minić |
| 18 | 1963 | Svetozar Gligorić (10) |
| 19 | 1964 | Borislav Ivkov (2); Mijo Udovčić |
| 20 | 1965 | Milan Matulović |
| 21 | 1966 | Svetozar Gligorić (11) |
| 22 | 1967 | Milan Matulović (2) |
| 23 | 1968 | Predrag Ostojić; Janez Stupica |
| 24 | 1969 | Aleksandar Matanović (2) |
| 25 | 1970 | Milan Vukić |
| 26 | 1971 | Predrag Ostojić (2); Milan Vukić (2) |
| 27 | 1972 | Borislav Ivkov (3) |
| 28 | 1973 | Božidar Ivanović |
| 29 | 1974 | Milan Vukić (3) |
| 30 | 1975 | Dragoljub Velimirović |
| 31 | 1976 | Krunoslav Hulak |
| 32 | 1977 | Ljubomir Ljubojević; Srđan Marangunić |
| 33 | 1978 | Aleksandar Matanović (3) |
| 34 | 1979 | Ivan Nemet |
| 35 | 1980 | Predrag Nikolić |
| 36 | 1981 | Božidar Ivanović (2) |
| 37 | 1982 | Ljubomir Ljubojević (2) |
| 38 | 1983 | Dušan Rajković |
| 39 | 1984 | Predrag Nikolić (2) |
| 40 | 1985 | Slavoljub Marjanović |
| 41 | 1986 | Dragan Barlov |
| 42 | 1987 | Miralem Dževlan |
| 43 | 1988 | Ivan Sokolov |
| 44 | 1989 | Zdenko Kožul |
| 45 | 1990 | Zdenko Kožul (2) |
| 46 | 1991 | Branko Damljanović |

=== Multiple-time winners ===
| Titles | Player | Years |
|---|---|---|
| 11 | Svetozar Gligorić | 1947, 1948, 1949, 1950, 1956, 1957, 1958, 1959, 1960, 1963, 1966 |
| 5 | Petar Trifunović | 1945, 1946, 1947, 1952, 1961 |
| 5 | Vasja Pirc | 1935, 1936, 1937, 1948, 1953 |
| 3 | Borislav Ivkov | 1958, 1964, 1972 |
| 3 | Aleksandar Matanović | 1962, 1969, 1978 |
| 3 | Milan Vukić | 1970, 1971, 1974 |
| 2 | Boris Kostić | 1935, 1938 |
| 2 | Milan Matulović | 1965, 1967 |
| 2 | Predrag Ostojić | 1968, 1971 |
| 2 | Božidar Ivanović | 1973, 1981 |
| 2 | Ljubomir Ljubojević | 1977, 1982 |
| 2 | Predrag Nikolić | 1980, 1984 |
| 2 | Zdenko Kožul | 1989, 1990 |

== Winners list (women) ==
=== Kingdom of Yugoslavia ===
The first women's championship of Yugoslavia was held in Zagreb in August 1939, and was won by Lidija Timofejeva and Jovanka Petrović. A women's chess tournament had previously been held in Ljubljana in 1926, in which only players from Ljubljana participated, and Sava Šerbanova was the winner.

=== SFR Yugoslavia ===
| No. | Year | Champion |
|---|---|---|
| 1 | 1947 | Lidija Timofejeva |
| 2 | 1948 | Lidija Timofejeva (2) |
| 3 | 1949 | Lidija Timofejeva (3); Slava Cvenkl |
| 4 | 1950 | Vera Nedeljković |
| 5 | 1951 | Vera Nedeljković (2) |
| 6 | 1952 | Vera Nedeljković (3); Milunka Lazarević |
| 7 | 1953 | Vera Nedeljković (4) |
| 8 | 1954 | Milunka Lazarević (2) |
| 9 | 1955 | Marija Nađ-Radenković |
| 10 | 1956 | Milunka Lazarević (3) |
| 11 | 1957 | Milunka Lazarević (4) |
| 12 | 1958 | Vera Nedeljković (5) |
| 13 | 1959 | Ljubica Jocić |
| 14 | 1960 | Milunka Lazarević (5) |
| 15 | 1961 | Katarina Jovanović-Blagojević |
| 16 | 1962 | Milunka Lazarević (6) |
| 17 | 1963 | Milunka Lazarević (7) |
| 18 | 1964 | Tereza Štadler |
| 19 | 1965 | Vera Nedeljković (6) |
| 20 | 1966 | Milka Ljiljak |
| 21 | 1968 | Henrijeta Konarkowska-Sokolov |
| 22 | 1969 | Ružica Jovanović |
| 23 | 1971/1 | Henrijeta Konarkowska-Sokolov (2) |
| 24 | 1971/10 | Katarina Jovanović-Blagojević (2) |
| 25 | 1973 | Vlasta Kalchbrenner; Tereza Štadler (2) |
| 26 | 1974/4 | Amalija Pihajlić |
| 27 | 1974/12 | Katarina Jovanović-Blagojević (3) |
| 28 | 1975 | Milunka Lazarević (8) |
| 29 | 1976 | Milunka Lazarević (9) |
| 30 | 1977 | Amalija Pihajlić (2); Gordana Marković |
| 31 | 1978 | Olivera Prokopović |
| 32 | 1979 | Milunka Lazarević (10) |
| 33 | 1980 | Vlasta Maček |
| 34 | 1981 | Gordana Marković (2) |
| 35 | 1982 | Milunka Lazarević (11) |
| 36 | 1983 | Marija Petrović; Suzana Maksimović |
| 37 | 1984 | Marija Petrović (2) |
| 38 | 1985 | Zorica Nikolin |
| 39 | 1986 | Alisa Marić |
| 40 | 1987 | Zorica Nikolin (2) |
| 41 | 1988 | Vesna Bašagić |
| 42 | 1989 | Daniela Nutu-Gajić |
| 43 | 1990 | Jordanka Mićić |
| 44 | 1991 | Mirjana Marić; Suzana Maksimović (2) |

=== Multiple-time winners ===
| Titles | Player | Years |
|---|---|---|
| 11 | Milunka Lazarević | 1952, 1954, 1956, 1957, 1960, 1962, 1963, 1975, 1976, 1979, 1982 |
| 6 | Vera Nedeljković | 1950, 1951, 1952, 1953, 1958, 1965 |
| 3 | Katarina Jovanović-Blagojević | 1961, 1971, 1974 |
| 3 | Lidija Timofejeva | 1947, 1948, 1949 |
| 2 | Henrijeta Konarkowska-Sokolov | 1968, 1971 |
| 2 | Tereza Štadler | 1964, 1973 |
| 2 | Vlasta Maček | 1973, 1980 |
| 2 | Amalija Pihajlić | 1974, 1977 |
| 2 | Gordana Marković | 1977, 1981 |
| 2 | Marija Petrović | 1983, 1984 |
| 2 | Zorica Nikolin | 1985, 1987 |
| 2 | Suzana Maksimović | 1983, 1991 |
