= Vasja Pirc =

Slovenian chess player

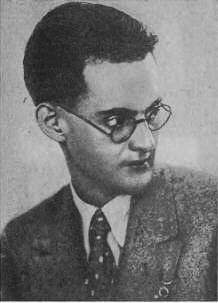
- Pirc in the 1930s

Personal information
- Born: December 19, 1907 Idrija, Carniola, Austria-Hungary
- Died: June 2, 1980 (aged 72) Ljubljana, SR Slovenia, Yugoslavia

Chess career
- Country: Yugoslavia
- Title: Grandmaster (1953)

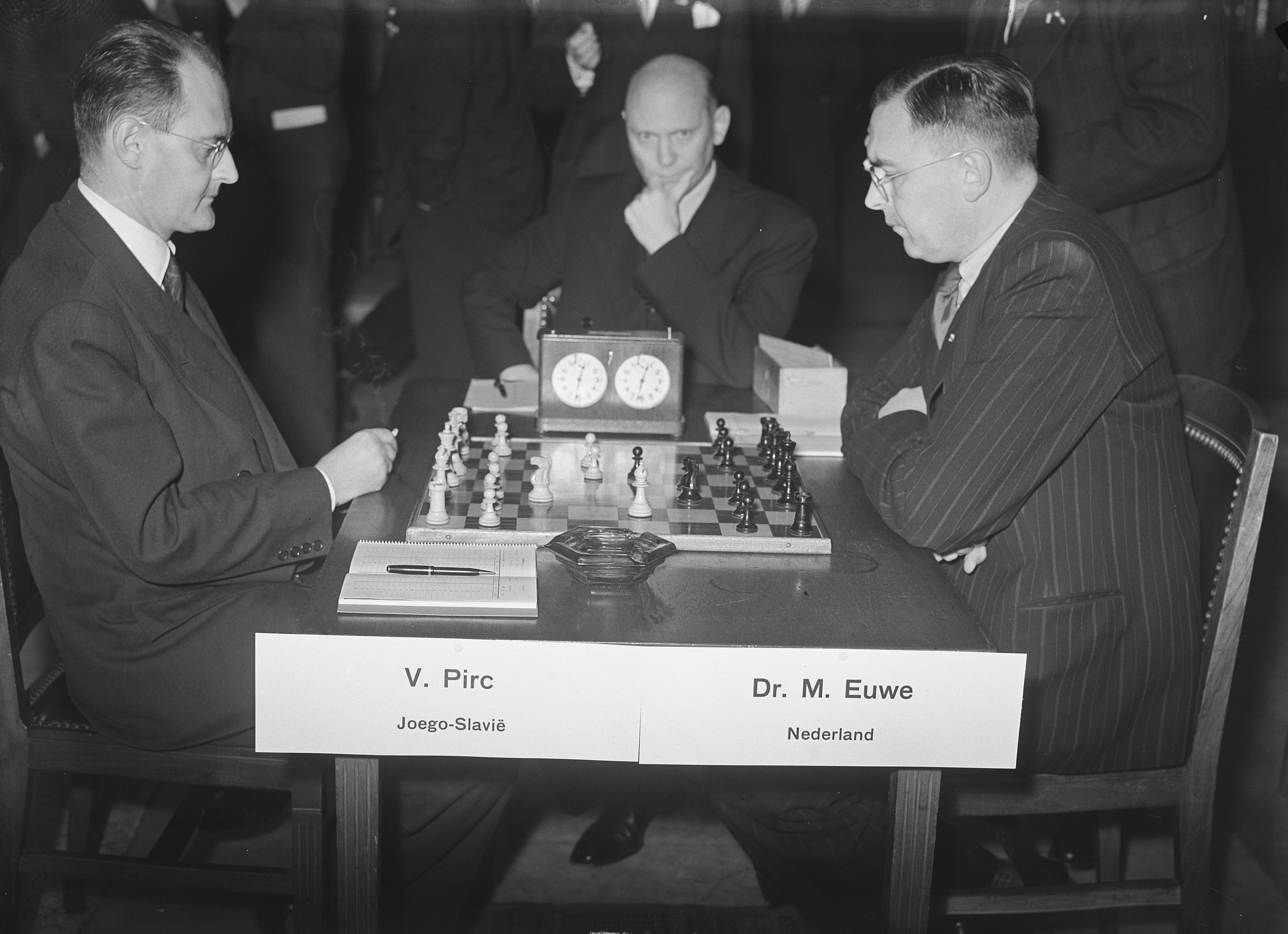
Pirc vs. Euwe (1950)

Vasja Pirc (/ˈpɪərts/ PEERTS; Slovene pronunciation: [ˈʋâːsja ˈpîːɾt͡s]) (December 19, 1907 – June 2, 1980) was a Yugoslav and Slovenian chess player. He is best known in competitive chess circles as a strong exponent of the hypermodern defense now generally known as the Pirc Defence.

Pirc was champion of Yugoslavia five times: 1935, 1936, 1937, 1948, and 1953. He was awarded the International Master title in 1950, and the Grandmaster title in 1953. He was made an International Arbiter in 1973.

Pirc was born in Idrija in 1907, then a part of the Austrian-Hungarian Empire. He died in Ljubljana in 1980.

== Sample game ==
Alekhine vs. Pirc, Ljubljana 1930

Position: a1 black rook, e2 white king, a2 black pawn, g3 white pawn, g4 white pawn, f4 white pawn, h6 black pawn, a6 white rook, g7 black pawn, g8 black king

Final position

Although Pirc had a minus record against Alexander Alekhine, he beat Alekhine with the black pieces in a blitz game in Ljubljana in 1930:

1.d4 e6 (Queen's Pawn Game, Horwitz Defense) 2.c4 (usually transposes to openings such as Queen's Gambit Declined, Nimzo-Indian or Queen's Indian) 2...Nf6 3.Nc3 Bb4 4.Bd2 b6 5.f3 Bxc3 6.Bxc3 d5 7.e3 0-0 8.Bd3 c5 9.Ne2 Nc6 10.0-0 Bb7 11.Qa4 Qd7 12.Qc2 Nb4 13.Bxb4 cxb4 14.b3 Rac8 15.e4 h6 16.e5 dxc4 17.bxc4 Nd5 18.Qd2 Nc3 19.Rae1 Rfd8 20.d5 exd5 21.c5 Rxc5 22.Nd4 Bc8 23.e6 Qc7 24.exf7+ Kxf7 25.f4 Ne4 26.Qb2 Rc3 27.Nf3 Kg8 28.Ne5 Qc5+ 29.Kh1 Qd4 30.Qe2 Bf5 31.g4 Ng3+ 32.hxg3 Bxd3 33.Nxd3 Rxd3 34.Rd1 Qe4+ 35.Qg2 Rc8 36.Rxd3 Qxd3 37.Rf2 Rc1+ 38.Kh2 a5 39.Rd2 Qe4 40.Qxe4 dxe4 41.Kg2 a4 42.Rd4 Rc2+ 43.Kf1 Rxa2 44.Rxb4 e3 45.Rxb6 e2+ 46.Kf2 a3 47.Ra6 Ra1 48.Kxe2 a2 0–1
