= Petar Trifunović =

Yugoslav chess grandmaster (1910–1980)

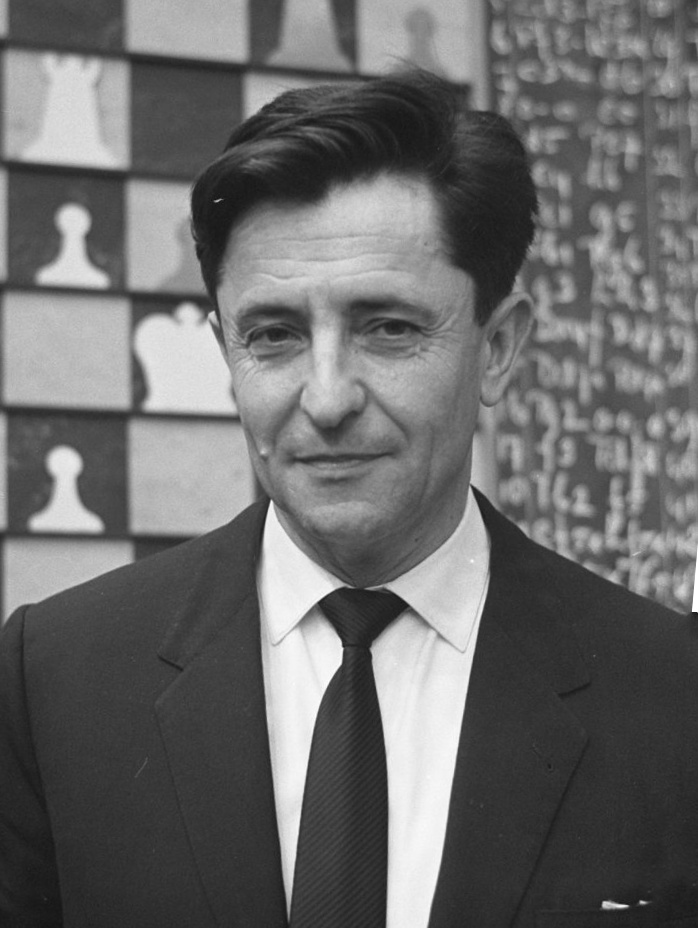
- Trifunović in 1962

Personal information
- Born: 31 August 1910 Dubrovnik, Austria-Hungary
- Died: 8 December 1980 (aged 70) Belgrade, Yugoslavia

Chess career
- Country: Yugoslavia
- Title: Grandmaster (1953)

Petar Trifunović (Serbian Cyrillic: Петар Трифуновић; 31 August 1910 – 8 December 1980) was a Yugoslav and Serbian chess player, who was awarded the international grandmaster title, and was a five-time Yugoslav champion.

== Chess career ==
Petar Trifunović
Medal record

Representing (Kingdom of Yugoslavia) Yugoslavia

Men's chess

Olympiad
Bronze medal – third place	1935 Warsaw	Individual board 4
Bronze medal – third place	1937 Stockholm	Individual board 2

Representing Yugoslavia

Men's chess

Olympiad
Gold medal – first place	1950 Dubrovnik	Open team
Gold medal – first place	1950 Dubrovnik	Individual board 3
Bronze medal – third place	1952 Helsinki	Open team
Bronze medal – third place	1954 Amsterdam	Open team
Silver medal – second place	1958 Munich	Open team
Silver medal – second place	1962 Varna	Open team

European Championship
Silver medal – second place	1957 Vienna	Open team
Gold medal – first place	1957 Vienna	Individual board 4
Silver medal – second place	1961 Oberhausen	Open team
Silver medal – second place	1965 Hamburg	Open team

Trifunovic came 3rd in the first Yugoslav championship (1935), 2nd in 1936, 1937 (shared with Mirko Breder and Boris Kostić), 1938 (shared with Milan Vidmar and Lajos Asztalos) and won in 1945, 1946, 1947 (shared with Svetozar Gligorić), 1952 and 1961. In total, Trifunović was among the top three players in the Yugoslav chess championship 16 times, which is second-most all time behind Gligorić's 18. The young Trifunovic was also an excellent scholar, obtaining a law degree in 1933, followed by a doctorate.

He had a reputation as an attacking player in the 1930s, when he was known as 'Typhoonovic'. Later, he concentrated more on positional play and defensive technique, his style becoming less adventurous but difficult to refute. As a result, he drew many games. For example, his drawn match with Miguel Najdorf at Opatija 1949 included ten drawn games (+1−1=10), and at Leipzig in 1965 he drew all 15 of his games.

His international tournament successes included: Zlín 1945 (first), Prague 1946 (tied for second after Najdorf), Lima 1950 (first), Cheltenham 1951 (tied for second after Gligorić) and Belgrade 1954 (third after Bronstein and Matanović, but ahead of Gligorić and Petrosian). At Netanya 1961 he tied for first with Matulović and Czerniak. At Prague 1961 and Beverwijk 1962 he came outright first and at Sarajevo, also in 1962, third after Gligorić and Portisch. Trifunović tied for first with 10 players at the 1962 Oklahoma City Open after drawing with Ken Smith and drawing with Bob Potter, a little-known expert from Dallas. At Noordwijk in 1965 he finished second to Botvinnik (ahead of Flohr, Larsen and Donner).

His greatest success on the World Championship cycle was participation in the 1948 Interzonal tournament where he finished in tenth place, narrowly missing the chance to participate in the inaugural 1950 Candidates Tournament.

After the introduction of chess titles in 1950, FIDE awarded him the international master title that same year and the grandmaster title in 1953 making him the third Serbian to become a grandmaster, after Boris Kostić (1950) and Svetozar Gligorić (1951). He played for his country in seven Chess Olympiads between 1935 and 1962 during which he won one gold, two silver and two bronze medals. His best individual result was the event held in his birthplace, Dubrovnik, in 1950. A score of 10/13 won him the board 3 gold medal. This was during a golden age of Serbian chess, a period when Yugoslavia (led by Serbian grandmasters like Trifunović, Gligorić, Ivkov, Matanović, Matulović, Ljubojević etc.) was the world's second-strongest chess nation.

During his career, Trifunović won 8 team and board medals at Chess Olympiad, which makes him the fourth-most decorated Serbian and Yugoslav player of all time behind Aleksandar Matanović (13), Svetozar Gligorić (13) and Borislav Ivkov (14).

== Rating and ranking ==
During his prime in the 1940s and 1950s, Trifunovic was one of the 20 best players in the world. His ELO rating is unknown since he was already retired when the Elo rating system was introduced in the early 1970s. His highest Historical Chessmetrics Rating was 2700, in November 1947, making him the 12th highest rated player at that moment.

== National team chess results ==
=== Chess Olympiad ===
- Warsaw 1935: board 4, 12½/16 (+10−1=5), board bronze;
- Munich 1936: board 2, 11/17 (+8−3=6), team 4th;
- Stockholm 1937: board 2, 11/16 (+8−2=6), board bronze;
- Dubrovnik 1950: board 3, 10/13 (+8−1=4), board gold, team gold;
- Helsinki 1952: board 3, 7/13 (+3−2=8), team bronze;
- Amsterdam 1954: board 3, 7/12 (+3−1=8), team bronze;
- Munich 1958: board 4, 7/11 (+5−2=4), team silver;
- Varna 1962: board 2, 9/15 (+4−1=10), team silver;

=== European Team Chess Championship ===
- Vienna 1957: board 4, 3/5 (+1−0=4), board gold, team silver;
- Oberhausen 1961: board 2, 5/9 (+1−0=8), team silver;
- Hamburg 1965: board 6, 3½/7 (+0−0=7), team silver;

== Legacy ==
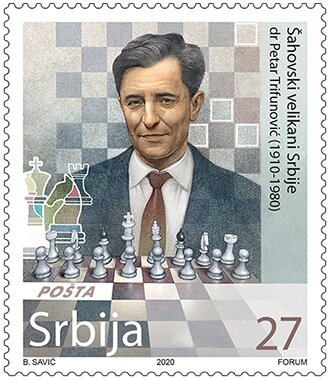
Trifunović on a 2020 stamp of Serbia

He popularised and subsequently had his name associated with a variation of Alekhine's Defence. The Trifunovic Variation is identified by the move 5...Bf5 as a counter to White's Four Pawns Attack (1.e4 Nf6 2.e5 Nd5 3.d4 d6 4.c4 Nb6 5.f4).

On 23 September 2020, the public company Pošta Srbije released new postage stamps called "Chess Giants of Serbia". In addition to Trifunović, Svetozar Gligorić, Boris Kostić, Milan Matulović and Milunka Lazarević were also given this honour. On that occasion, short biographies of the players depicted on these stamps were also published. The texts are given in Serbian and English, and their authors are: Trifunović's teammate from the national team and close friend, grandmaster Aleksandar Matanović and sports journalist Miroslav Nešić.
