= Marko (given name) =

- Pronunciation: Serbo-Croatian: [mâːrko]
- Gender: Male

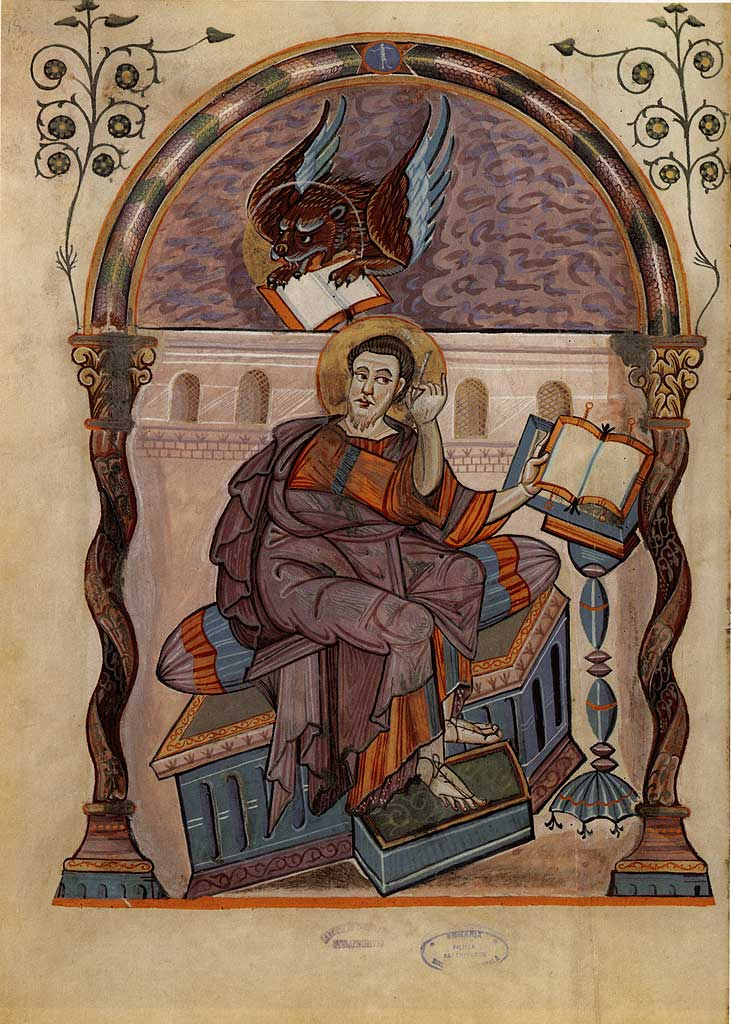
Mark the Evangelist

Marko is a masculine given name, a cognate of Mark. The male name Marko is a Roman personal name that comes from the Latin word "Marti-co-s" which is a derivative of Mars, the Roman god of war.

In Croatia, the name Marko was the second most common masculine given name in the decades between 1980 and 1999, and third most common 2000–2011.

== People ==
- Prince Marko (c. 1335–1395), Serbian feudal lord in Serbian Kingdom, today part of Northern Macedonia
- Marko Ahtisaari (born 1969), Finnish businessman and musician
- Marko Albert (born 1979), Estonian triathlete
- Marko Albrecht (born 1970; better known as Mark 'Oh), German DJ
- Marko Anđelković (born 1984), Serbian football player
- Marko Andić (born 1983), Serbian football player
- Marko Anttila (born 1985), Finnish ice hockey player
- Marko Arnautović (born 1989), Austrian football player
- Marko Asell (born 1970), Finnish wrestler and politician
- Marko Asmer (born 1984), Estonian racecar driver
- Marko Baacke (born 1980), German Nordic combined skier
- Marko Babić (disambiguation), multiple people
- Marko Bajić (born 1985), Serbian football player
- Marko Banić (born 1984), Croatian basketball player
- Marko Barun (born 1978), Slovenian football player
- Marko Baša (born 1982), Montenegrin football player
- Marko Bašara (born 1984), Serbian football player
- Marko Bašić (disambiguation), multiple people
- Marko Bedenikovic (born 1984), Canadian football player
- Marko Bezjak (born 1986), Slovenian handball player
- Marko Bezruchko (1883–1944), Ukrainian military commander
- Marko Blažić (born 1985), Serbian football player
- Marko Bošković (born 1982), Serbian football player
- Marko Božič (Slovenian footballer) (born 1984), Slovenian football player
- Marko Brainović (1920–2010), Croatian water polo player
- Marko Bruerović (1770–1823), Croatian writer
- Marko Bulat (disambiguation), multiple people
- Marko Čakarević (born 1988), Serbian basketball player
- Marko Car (disambiguation), multiple people
- Marko Cavka (born 1981), American football player
- Marko Čelebonović (1902–1986), Serbian painter
- Marko Cepenkov (1829–1920), Macedonian folklorist
- Marko Ćetković (born 1986), Montenegrin football player
- Marko Cheremshyna (1874–1927), Ukrainian writer
- Marko Ciurlizza (born 1978), Peruvian football player
- Marko Čolaković (born 1980), Montenegrin football player
- Marko Antonio Cortés Mendoza (born 1977), Mexican politician
- Marko Đalović (born 1986), Serbian football player
- Marko Dapcevich (born 1969), American politician
- Štefan Marko Daxner (1822–1892), Slovak politician, lawyer and poet
- Marko Dević (born 1983), Ukrainian football player of Serbian descent
- Marko Dinjar (born 1986), Croatian football player
- Marko Djokovic (born 1991), Serbian tennis player
- Marko Djurdjević (born 1979), German illustrator and concept artist of Serbian descent
- Marko Dmitrović (born 1992), Serbian football goalkeeper
- Marko Đorđević (footballer) (born 1983), Serbian football player
- Marko Đorđević (skier) (born 1978), Serbian alpine skier
- Marko Došen (1859–1944), Croatian politician
- Marko Elsner (born 1960), Slovenian football player
- Marko Feingold (1913–2019), Austrian holocaust survivor, Salzburg Jewish community president, and centenarian
- Márkó Futács (born 1990), Hungarian football player
- Marko Gobeljić (born 1992), Serbian football player
- Marko Grgić (footballer) (born 1987), Croatian football player
- Marko Grubelić (born 1980), Serbian football player
- Marko Grujić (born 1996), Serbian football player
- Marko Attila Hoare (born 1972), Yugoslavian British historian
- Marko Hietala (born 1966), Finnish bassist and singer
- Marko Hranilović (1908–1931), Croatian politician
- Marko Ilić (born 1985), Serbian football player
- Marko Ivović, Serbian volleyball player
- Marko Janjetović (born 1984), Croatian football player
- Marko Jantunen (born 1971), Finnish ice hockey player
- Marko Jarić (born 1978), Serbian basketball player
- Marko Jesic (born 1989), Australian football player of Serbian descent
- Marko Jovanović (disambiguation), several people
- Marko Kaljuveer (born 1964), Estonian sports journalist
- Marko Kantele (born 1986), Finnish darts player
- Marko Kartelo (born 1981), Croatian football player
- Marko Kauppinen (born 1979), Finnish ice hockey player
- Marko Kemppainen (born 1976), Finnish sports shooter
- Marko Kešelj (born 1988), Serbian basketball player
- Marko Kilp (born 1993), Estonian cross-country skier
- Marko Kiprusoff (born 1972), Finnish ice hockey player
- Marko Kitti (born 1970), Finnish writer
- Marko Klasinc (born 1951), Slovenian chess problemist
- Marko Klok (born 1968), Dutch volleyball player
- Marko Kmetec (born 1976), Slovenian football player
- Marko Koers (born 1972), Dutch runner
- Marko Koivuranta (born 1978), Finnish football player
- Marko Kolsi (born 1985), Finnish football player
- Marko Kon (born 1972), Serbian singer
- Marko Kopilas (born 1983), Croatian football player
- Marko Koprtla (1929–1997), Croatian politician
- Marko Kovač (born 1981), Serbian architect and film director
- Marko Kravos (born 1943), Slovenian writer and translator
- Marko Kristal (born 1973), Estonian football player
- Marko Krizin (1589–1619), Croatian saint
- Marko Kropyvnytskyi (1840-1910), Ukrainian writer and actor
- Marko Leko (1853–1932), Serbian chemist
- Marko Lelov (born 1973), Estonian football player
- Marko Lerinski (1862–1902; born as Georgi Ivanov Gyurov), Bulgarian military man
- Marko Liefke (born 1974), German volleyball player
- Marko Lihteneker (1959–2005), Slovenian ski mountaineer and mountain climber
- Marko Liias (born 1981), American politician of Finnish descent
- Marko Lipp (born 1999), Estonian footballer
- Marko Livaja (born 1996), Croatian football player
- Marko Ljubinković (born 1981), Serbian football player
- Marko Lomić (born 1983), Serbian football player
- Marko Lopušina (born 1951), Serbian journalist and publicist
- Marko Luhamaa (born 1975), Estonian karateka
- Marko Lunder (born 1983), Slovenian football player
- Marko Mäetamm (born 1965), Estonian artist
- Marko Mäkilaakso (born 1978), Finnish music video and film director
- Marko Mäkinen (born 1977), Finnish ice hockey player
- Marko Maksimović (footballer) (born 1984), Bosnian football manager
- Marko Maksimović (politician) (born 1947), Serbian politician
- Marko Maksimović (tennis) (born 2006), Serbian tennis player
- Marko Marić (born 1983), Croatian football player
- Marko Marin
  - Marko Marin (footballer) (born 1989), German football player of Bosnian Serb origin
  - Marko Marin (professor) (1930–2015), Slovenian theatre director and art historian
- Marko Marinović (born 1983), Serbian basketball player
- Marko Markov (born 1981), Bulgarian football player
- Marko Markovski (born 1986), Serbian football player
- Marko Marović (born 1983), Serbian football player
- Marko Martin (born 1975), Estonian pianist
- Marko Marulić (1450–1524), Croatian poet
- Marko Matvere (born 1968), Estonian actor and singer
- Marko Meerits (born 1992), Estonian football player
- Marko Mesić (disambiguation), several people
- Marko Milenkovič (born 1976), Slovenian swimmer
- Marko Milić (disambiguation), several people
- Marko Milinković (born 1988), Serbian football player
- Marko Milivojević, Serbian drummer
- Marko Miljanov (1833–1901), Serbian Montenegrin writer
- Marko Milovanović (footballer, born 1982), Serbian footballer
- Marko Milovanović (footballer, born 2003), Serbian footballer
- Marko Mirić (born 1987), Serbian football player
- Marko Mitchell (born 1985), American football player
- Marko Mitrović (footballer, born 1978), Serbian football player
- Marko Mitrović (footballer, born 1992), Swedish football player
- Marko Mlinarić (born 1960), Croatian football player
- Marko Mugoša (born 1984), Montenegrin football player
- Marko Murat (1864–1944), Croatian painter
- Marko Mušič (born 1941), Slovenian architect
- Marko Muslin (born 1985), French football player of Serbian descent
- Marko Myyry (born 1967), Finnish football player
- Marko Natlačen (1886–1942), Slovenian politician and jurist
- Marko Nešić (disambiguation) several people
- Marko Nikolić (disambiguation) several people
- Marko Nowak, German ice hockey player
- Marko Orešković (1895–1941), Croatian partisan
- Marko Orlandić (1930–2019), Montenegrin politician
- Marko Oštir (born 1977), Slovenian handball player
- Marko Paasikoski (born 1978), Finnish former bassist of Sonata Arctica (band)
- Marko Palavestrić (born 1982), Serbian football player
- Marko Palo (born 1967), Finnish ice hockey player
- Marko Pantelić (born 1978), Serbian football player
- Marko Pavlović (born 1982), Serbian football goalkeeper
- Marko Pećki (1360–1411), Serbian writer
- Marko Perković (born 1966), Croatian singer
- Marko Perović (disambiguation), several people
- Marko Petkovšek (1955–2023), Slovenian mathematician
- Marko Pogačnik (born 1984), Slovenian artist and writer
- Marko Pohlin (1735–1801), Slovenian philologist and writer
- Marko Pomerants (born 1964), Estonian politician
- Marko Popović (disambiguation), multiple people
- Marko Pöyhönen, Finnish ice hockey player
- Marko Pregl, Slovenian politician
- Marko Pridigar (born 1985), Slovenian football player
- Marko Purišić (born 1995; better known as Baby Lasagna), Croatian singer-songwriter and music producer
- Marko Pusa (born 1977), Finnish darts player
- Marko Putinčanin (born 1987), Serbian football player
- Marko Raat (born 1973), Estonian film director
- Marko Račič (1920–2022), Slovenian runner
- Marko Radaš (born 1983), Croatian football player
- Marko Rajamäki (born 1968), Finnish football manager and former player
- Marko Ranđelović (born 1984), Serbian football player
- Marko Ranilovič (born 1986), Slovenian football player
- Marko Rašo (born 1989), Croatian football player
- Marko Rehmer (born 1972), German footballer
- Marko Reijonen (born 1967; better known as Waldo), Finnish Eurodance musician
- Marko Rudan (born 1975), Australian football manager
- Marko Rudić (born 1990), Bosnia and Herzegovina alpine skier
- Marko Salatović (born 1984), Croatian football coach and former player
- Marko dos Santos (born 1981), Brazilian football player
- Marko Šarlija (born 1982), Croatian football goalkeeper
- Marko Savić
  - Marko Savić (1941–2013), Serbian pianist
  - Marko Savić (born 1984), Serbian football player
- Marko Savolainen (born 1973), Finnish bodybuilder
- Marko Šćepović (born 1991), Serbian football player
- Marko Sentić (born 1976), Croatian judoka
- Marko Simonović (born 1986), Serbian basketball player
- Marko Simeunovič (born 1967), Slovenian football player
- Marko Šimić (disambiguation), several people
- Marko Škop (born 1974), Slovak film director
- Marko Škreb (born 1957), Croatian economist
- Marko Snoj (born 1959), Slovenian linguist
- Marko Sočanac (born 1978), Serbian football player
- Marko Sopi (1938–2006), Albanian clergyman
- Márkó Sós (born 1990), Hungarian football player
- Marko Spittka (born 1971), German judoka
- Marko Stanković (born 1986), Austrian football player of Serbian descent
- Marko Stanojevic (born 1979), Italian rugby union footballer
- Marko Stetner, Slovenian politician
- Marko Stevović (born 1996), Serbian alpine skier
- Marko Strahija (born 1975), Croatian swimmer
- Marko Šuler (born 1983), Slovenian football player
- Marko Sušac (born 1988), Bosnian football player
- Marko Šutalo (born 1983), Bosnian basketball player
- Marko Tajčević (1900–1984), Croatian and Serbian composer and musician
- Marko Tiidla (born 1991), Estonian swimmer
- Marko Tkalec (born 1977), Slovenian tennis player
- Marko Todorović (1929–2000), Bosnian Serb actor
- Marko Tomas (born 1985), Croatian basketball player
- Marko Tomasović (disambiguation), several people
- Marko Topić (born 1976), Bosnian football player
- Marko Torm (born 1980), Estonian politician
- Marko Tredup (born 1974), German football player
- Marko Tuomainen (born 1972), Finnish ice hockey player
- Marko Tuomela (born 1972), Finnish football player
- Marko Tušek (born 1975), Slovenian basketball player
- Marko Tuulola (born 1971), Finnish ice hockey
- Marko Valok (1927–1996), Serbian football player
- Marko Varalahti, Finnish strongman
- Marko Vego (1907–1985), Croatian archaeologist
- Marko Vejinović (born 1990), Dutch football player
- Marko Veselica (1936–2017), Croatian politician
- Marko Vešović (born 1991), Montenegrin football player
- Marko Vidojković (born 1975), Serbian writer
- Marko Vidovic (born 1988), Serbian football player
- Marko Vovchok (1833–1907), Ukrainian writer
- Marko Vranić (born 1978), Serbian football player
- Marko Vuckovic, American football players
- Marko Vukićević (born 1992), Serbian alpine skier
- Marko Vuoriheimo (born 1978; better known as Signmark), Finnish deaf rapper
- Marko Wahlman (born 1969), Finnish hammer thrower
- Marko Wiz, Slovenian politician
- Marko Yli-Hannuksela (born 1973), Finnish wrestler
- Marko Zaror (born 1978), Chilean martial artist, actor and stuntman
- Marko Živić, Serbian actor, comedian, humanitarian and host (Marko Živić Show)
- Marko Zorić (born 1980), Serbian football player

== Fictional characters ==
- Marko, vampire from The Lost Boys
- Marko, character from Saga (comics)
- Marko Ramius, character from The Hunt for Red October
- Marko Hoxha, secondary antagonist from the Taken franchise

== See also ==
- Marco (given name)
- Markko (disambiguation)
- Marcos (given name), Marcos or Markos
