= 1956 SFR Yugoslavia Chess Championship =

11th edition of SFR Yugoslav Chess Championship

11th SFR Yugoslavia Chess Championship
- Location: Skopje

Champion
- Svetozar Gligorić

The 1956 SFR Yugoslavia Chess Championship was the 11th edition of SFR Yugoslav Chess Championship. Held in Skopje, SFR Yugoslavia, SR Macedonia. The tournament was won by Svetozar Gligorić.

11th SFR Yugoslavia Chess Championship
N°	Player	Wins	Draws	Losses	Total points
1	(Socialist Federal Republic of Yugoslavia) Svetozar Gligorić	9	10	0	14
2	(Socialist Federal Republic of Yugoslavia) Aleksandar Matanović	9	9	1	13.5
3	(Socialist Federal Republic of Yugoslavia) Borislav Ivkov	8	10	1	13
4	(Socialist Federal Republic of Yugoslavia) Borislav Milić	8	7	4	11.5
5	(Socialist Federal Republic of Yugoslavia) Mijo Udovčić	5	13	1	11.5
6	(Socialist Federal Republic of Yugoslavia) Vasja Pirc	3	15	1	10.5
7	(Socialist Federal Republic of Yugoslavia) Dragoljub Janošević	8	4	7	10
8	(Socialist Federal Republic of Yugoslavia) Vladimir Sokolov	5	10	4	10
9	(Socialist Federal Republic of Yugoslavia) Arsenije Lukić	3	14	2	10
10	(Socialist Federal Republic of Yugoslavia) Petar Trifunović	4	11	4	9.5
11	(Socialist Federal Republic of Yugoslavia) Rudolf Marić	4	11	4	9.5
12	(Socialist Federal Republic of Yugoslavia) Nikola Karaklajić	5	8	6	9
13	(Socialist Federal Republic of Yugoslavia) Braslav Rabar	3	12	4	9
14	(Socialist Federal Republic of Yugoslavia) Božidar Đurašević	2	14	3	9
15	(Socialist Federal Republic of Yugoslavia) Milan Matulović	5	8	6	9
16	(Socialist Federal Republic of Yugoslavia) Rade Jovanić	4	9	6	8.5
17	(Socialist Federal Republic of Yugoslavia) Dragutin Đaja	3	9	7	7.5
18	(Socialist Federal Republic of Yugoslavia) Vasilije Tomović	5	2	12	6
19	(Socialist Federal Republic of Yugoslavia) Bora Tot	2	5	12	4.5
20	(Socialist Federal Republic of Yugoslavia) Dragoljub Ćirić	0	9	10	4.5
