= 1955 SFR Yugoslavia Chess Championship =

10th SFR Yugoslavia Chess Championship
- Location: Novi Sad

Champion
- Nikola Karaklajić

The 10th anniversary championship of Yugoslavia was played in the National Assembly of Vojvodina in Novi Sad. The reserve player, Master Nikola Karaklajić, played the draw of his life against Gligorić in the last round (otherwise he would have played an additional match with him for the title) and deservedly and convincingly won the title. The first 6 gained the right to participate directly in the next championship, the first 10 won prizes, and the first 15 directly participated in the semi-finals. Five debutants, five Candidate Masters, fought for 8.5 points (50%), in which only Milan Matulović succeeded and thus became a Master.

== Players ==
The first six from the 1953 SFR Yugoslavia Chess Championship had a direct right to participate: Vasja Pirc, Braslav Rabar, Andrija Fuderer, Borislav Milić, Dragoljub Janošević and Svetozar Gligorić, as well as members of the Olympic team: Petar Trifunović and Aleksandar Matanović. The others qualified through the semi-final tournaments, from Skopje: Stojan Puc, Borislav Ivkov, Milosav Vuković and Lajoš Segi, from Sarajevo: Juraj Nikolac, Petar Smederevac, Milan Matulović and Rajko Bogdanović, and from Trstenik: Mario Bertok, Božidar Đurašević, Mihajlo Trajković and Zdravko Vošpernik. Applications were considered until January 17. Svetozar Gligorić (due to busy schedule), Andrija Fuderer (due to exams) and Juraj Nikolac canceled. It is mentioned that old grandmasters (but it is not clear if they actually had the right to play) Milan Vidmar (due to illness) and Borislav Kostić (who originally signed up) also canceled. Chess Federation of Yugoslavia closed the list with 19 participants on the 20th January, where the subsequent application of Svetozar Gligorić was received (who, in the meantime, was delegated with Borislav Ivkov for the tournament in Mar del Plata and Buenos Aires), and Nikola Karaklajić was accepted as the first reserve (the best fifth placer with three semi-finals). A few days before the start of the tournament, Vasja Pirc (due to illness) and Milosav Vuković (as a military conscript could not get a leave) canceled, and the remaining fifth-placed players from the semi-finals, Arsenije Lukić and Mijo Udovčić, were included as reserves (he was forgiven a three-month suspension for violations in semi-final). The last one who canceled was Petar Trifunović (due to family reasons), who thus missed the opportunity to be a jubilee player and take part in the championship for the tenth time. In the end, the list was left with 18 players, and the jubilee players are Svetozar Gligorić, Borislav Milić and Stojan Puc.

== Table and results ==
10th SFR Yugoslavia Chess Championship
N°	Player	Wins	Draws	Losses	Total points
1	(Socialist Federal Republic of Yugoslavia) NM Nikola Karaklajić	8	8	1	12
2	(Socialist Federal Republic of Yugoslavia) GM Svetozar Gligorić	5	12	0	11
3	(Socialist Federal Republic of Yugoslavia) IM Borislav Ivkov	7	7	3	10.5
4	(Socialist Federal Republic of Yugoslavia) IM Braslav Rabar	5	11	1	10.5
5	(Socialist Federal Republic of Yugoslavia) IM Aleksandar Matanović	5	10	2	10
6	(Socialist Federal Republic of Yugoslavia) IM Borislav Milić	6	8	3	10
7	(Socialist Federal Republic of Yugoslavia) NM Mario Bertok	4	11	2	9.5
8	(Socialist Federal Republic of Yugoslavia) NM Mihailo Trajković	5	9	3	9.5
9	(Socialist Federal Republic of Yugoslavia) CM Milan Matulović	6	7	4	9.5
10	(Socialist Federal Republic of Yugoslavia) NM Dragoljub Janošević	5	8	4	9
11	(Socialist Federal Republic of Yugoslavia) NM Božidar Đurašević	2	14	1	9
12	(Socialist Federal Republic of Yugoslavia) NM Mijo Udovčić	6	5	6	8.5
13	(Socialist Federal Republic of Yugoslavia) CM Lajoš Segi	4	6	7	7
14	(Socialist Federal Republic of Yugoslavia) NM Rajko Bogdanović	2	10	5	7
15	(Socialist Federal Republic of Yugoslavia) IM Stojan Puc	2	7	8	5.5
16	(Socialist Federal Republic of Yugoslavia) CM Petar Smederevac	1	9	7	5.5
17	(Socialist Federal Republic of Yugoslavia) CM Arsenije Lukić	2	6	9	5
18	(Socialist Federal Republic of Yugoslavia) CM Zdravko Vošpernik	2	4	11	2.5
