= 1958 SFR Yugoslavia Chess Championship =

13th edition of SFR Yugoslav Chess Championship

13th SFR Yugoslavia Chess Championship
- Location: Sarajevo

Champion
- Svetozar Gligorić and Borislav Ivkov

The 1958 SFR Yugoslavia Chess Championship was the 13th edition of SFR Yugoslav Chess Championship. Held in Sarajevo, SFR Yugoslavia, SR Bosnia & Herzegovina. The tournament was won by Svetozar Gligorić and Borislav Ivkov.

12th SFR Yugoslavia Chess Championship
N°	Player (age)	Wins	Draws	Losses	Total points
1	(Socialist Federal Republic of Yugoslavia) Svetozar Gligorić (35)	7	11	1	12.5
2	(Socialist Federal Republic of Yugoslavia) Borislav Ivkov (25)	6	13	0	12.5
3	(Socialist Federal Republic of Yugoslavia) Božidar Đurašević (25)	5	13	1	11.5
4	(Socialist Federal Republic of Yugoslavia) Aleksandar Matanović (28)	6	11	2	11.5
5	(Socialist Federal Republic of Yugoslavia) Petar Trifunović (48)	3	16	0	11
6	(Socialist Federal Republic of Yugoslavia) Milan Matulović (23)	7	8	4	11
7	(Socialist Federal Republic of Yugoslavia) Rajko Bogdanović (27)	5	11	3	10.5
8	(Socialist Federal Republic of Yugoslavia) Borislav Milić (33)	4	13	2	10.5
9	(Socialist Federal Republic of Yugoslavia) Vladimir Sokolov (25)	6	9	4	10.5
10	(Socialist Federal Republic of Yugoslavia) Stojan Puc (37)	3	14	2	10
11	(Socialist Federal Republic of Yugoslavia) Milan Vukčević (21)	3	13	3	9.5
12	(Socialist Federal Republic of Yugoslavia) Dragoljub Ćirić (23)	4	11	4	9.5
13	(Socialist Federal Republic of Yugoslavia) Dragoljub Janošević (35)	7	4	8	9
14	(Socialist Federal Republic of Yugoslavia) Dragutin Dimc (26)	5	8	6	9
15	(Socialist Federal Republic of Yugoslavia) Sava Vuković (46)	3	10	6	8
16	(Socialist Federal Republic of Yugoslavia) Dušan Ivković (28)	1	12	6	7
17	(Socialist Federal Republic of Yugoslavia) Arsenije Lukić (26)	2	10	7	7
18	(Socialist Federal Republic of Yugoslavia) Nikola Karaklajić (32)	3	7	9	6.5
19	(Socialist Federal Republic of Yugoslavia) Vinko Cuderman (25)	2	9	8	6.5
20	(Socialist Federal Republic of Yugoslavia) Jovan Sofrevski (23)	2	9	8	6.5
