= 1953 SFR Yugoslavia Chess Championship =

9th edition of SFR Yugoslav Chess Championship

9th SFR Yugoslavia Chess Championship
- Location: Zagreb

Champion
- Vasja Pirc

The 1953 SFR Yugoslavia Chess Championship was the 9th edition of SFR Yugoslav Chess Championship. Held in Zagreb, SFR Yugoslavia, SR Croatia. The tournament was won by Vasja Pirc. First three players were tied for 1st, so they played champions play-off.

== Table and results ==
9th SFR Yugoslavia Chess Championship
N°	Player	Wins	Draws	Losses	Total points
1	(Socialist Federal Republic of Yugoslavia) Andrija Fuderer	6	11	0	11.5
2	(Socialist Federal Republic of Yugoslavia) Braslav Rabar	7	9	1	11.5
3	(Socialist Federal Republic of Yugoslavia) Vasja Pirc	7	9	1	11.5
4	(Socialist Federal Republic of Yugoslavia) Svetozar Gligorić	6	9	2	10.5
5	(Socialist Federal Republic of Yugoslavia) Borislav Milić	6	9	2	10.5
6	(Socialist Federal Republic of Yugoslavia) Dragoljub Janošević	7	7	3	10.5
7	(Socialist Federal Republic of Yugoslavia) Juraj Nikolac	4	12	3	10
8	(Socialist Federal Republic of Yugoslavia) Srećko Nedeljković	4	11	2	9.5
9	(Socialist Federal Republic of Yugoslavia) Božidar Đurašević	4	11	2	9.5
10	(Socialist Federal Republic of Yugoslavia) Petar Trifunović	2	14	1	9
11	(Socialist Federal Republic of Yugoslavia) Aleksandar Matanović	4	9	4	8.5
12	(Socialist Federal Republic of Yugoslavia) Mijo Udovčić	6	5	6	8.5
13	(Socialist Federal Republic of Yugoslavia) Rudolf Marić	1	12	4	7
14	(Socialist Federal Republic of Yugoslavia) Dragutin Dimc	3	7	7	6.5
15	(Socialist Federal Republic of Yugoslavia) Rajko Bogdanović	2	7	8	5.5
16	(Socialist Federal Republic of Yugoslavia) Anton Preinfalk	1	9	7	5.5
17	(Socialist Federal Republic of Yugoslavia) Stojan Puc	3	4	10	5
18	(Socialist Federal Republic of Yugoslavia) Ante Bulat	1	3	13	2.5

9th SFR Yugoslavia Chess Championship, 1st- 3rd place Play-off
N°	Player	Wins	Draws	Losses	Total points
1	(Socialist Federal Republic of Yugoslavia) Vasja Pirc	1	3	0	2.5
2	(Socialist Federal Republic of Yugoslavia) Braslav Rabar	1	2	1	2
3	(Socialist Federal Republic of Yugoslavia) Andrija Fuderer	1	1	2	1.5
