= 1965 SFR Yugoslavia Chess Championship =

20th edition of SFR Yugoslav Chess Championship

20th SFR Yugoslavia Chess Championship
- Location: Novi Sad

Champions
- Milan Matulović

The 1965 SFR Yugoslavia Chess Championship was the 20th edition of SFR Yugoslav Chess Championship. Held in Novi Sad, SFR Yugoslavia, SR Serbia, SAP Vojvodina, between 7 February and 6 March 1965. The tournament was won by Milan Matulović

14th SFR Yugoslavia Chess Championship
N°	Player (age)	Wins	Draws	Losses	Total points
1	(Socialist Federal Republic of Yugoslavia) Milan Matulović (30)	10	6	3	13
2	(Socialist Federal Republic of Yugoslavia) Svetozar Gligorić (42)	7	10	2	12
3	(Socialist Federal Republic of Yugoslavia) Bruno Parma (24)	6	12	1	12
4	(Socialist Federal Republic of Yugoslavia) Ivan Buljovčić (39)	5	12	2	11
5	(Socialist Federal Republic of Yugoslavia) Dragoljub Ćirić (30)	6	10	3	11
6	(Socialist Federal Republic of Yugoslavia) Aleksandar Bradvarević (32)	4	13	2	10.5
7	(Socialist Federal Republic of Yugoslavia) Albin Planinc (21)	7	6	6	10
8	(Socialist Federal Republic of Yugoslavia) Mario Bertok (36)	3	14	2	10
9	(Socialist Federal Republic of Yugoslavia) Stanimir Nikolić (30)	7	6	6	10
10	(Socialist Federal Republic of Yugoslavia) Juraj Nikolac (33)	7	5	7	9.5
11	(Socialist Federal Republic of Yugoslavia) Rajko Bogdanović (34)	5	9	5	9.5
12	(Socialist Federal Republic of Yugoslavia) Mato Damjanović (38)	5	9	5	9.5
13	(Socialist Federal Republic of Yugoslavia) Dragoljub Minić (28)	2	14	3	9
14	(Socialist Federal Republic of Yugoslavia) Đorđije Đurović (31)	5	8	6	9
15	(Socialist Federal Republic of Yugoslavia) Marjan Ankerst (23)	3	11	5	8.5
16	(Socialist Federal Republic of Yugoslavia) Dimitar Ilijevski (24)	3	9	7	7.5
17	(Socialist Federal Republic of Yugoslavia) Vladimir Sokolov (32)	1	13	5	7.5
18	(Socialist Federal Republic of Yugoslavia) Predrag Ostojić (27)	2	11	7	7.5
19	(Socialist Federal Republic of Yugoslavia) Stojan Puc (44)	1	11	7	6.5
20	(Socialist Federal Republic of Yugoslavia) Slavko Leban (28)	5	3	11	6.5
