= 1967 SFR Yugoslavia Chess Championship =

22nd edition of SFR Yugoslav Chess Championship

22nd SFR Yugoslavia Chess Championship
- Location: Kraljevo

Champions
- Milan Matulović

The 1967 SFR Yugoslavia Chess Championship was the 22nd edition of SFR Yugoslav Chess Championship. Held in Kraljevo, SFR Yugoslavia, SR Serbia, between 20 April and 13 May 1967. The tournament was won by Milan Matulović.

22nd SFR Yugoslavia Chess Championship
N°	Player (age)	Wins	Draws	Losses	Total points
1	(Socialist Federal Republic of Yugoslavia) Milan Matulović (32)	7	10	0	12
2	(Socialist Federal Republic of Yugoslavia) Enver Bukić (30)	4	11	2	9.5
3	(Socialist Federal Republic of Yugoslavia) Borislav Ivkov (34)	4	11	2	9.5
4	(Socialist Federal Republic of Yugoslavia) Aleksandar Matanović (37)	3	13	1	9.5
5	(Socialist Federal Republic of Yugoslavia) Rajko Bogdanović (36)	3	13	1	9.5
6	(Socialist Federal Republic of Yugoslavia) Dragoljub Ćirić (32)	5	9	3	9.5
7	(Socialist Federal Republic of Yugoslavia) Aleksandar Bradvarević (34)	3	12	3	9
8	(Socialist Federal Republic of Yugoslavia) Vladimir Sokolov (34)	2	14	1	9
9	(Socialist Federal Republic of Yugoslavia) Dragoljub Minić (30)	2	14	1	9
10	(Socialist Federal Republic of Yugoslavia) Dragoljub Janošević (44)	3	11	3	8.5
11	(Socialist Federal Republic of Yugoslavia) Mario Bertok (38)	1	15	1	8.5
12	(Socialist Federal Republic of Yugoslavia) Ivan Buljovčić (41)	3	11	3	8.5
13	(Socialist Federal Republic of Yugoslavia) Milorad Knežević (31)	3	11	3	8.5
14	(Socialist Federal Republic of Yugoslavia) Vlatko Kovačević (25)	2	11	4	7.5
15	(Socialist Federal Republic of Yugoslavia) Rudolf Marić (40)	1	13	3	7.5
16	(Socialist Federal Republic of Yugoslavia) Milan Vukić (25)	1	13	3	7.5
17	(Socialist Federal Republic of Yugoslavia) Darko Gliksman (30)	4	4	9	6
18	(Socialist Federal Republic of Yugoslavia) Zvonimir Meštrović (23)	2	4	11	4
