= Mesic =

Mesic may refer to:

- Mesic, North Carolina, a town in the United States
- Mesic habitat, a type of habitat
- Mesić (disambiguation), a South Slavic surname and toponym
- Mešić, a South Slavic surname

== See also ==
- Meson
