= 2019–20 Swiss Challenge League =

Swiss Challenge League
- Season: 2019–20
- Champions: Lausanne
- Promoted: Lausanne; Vaduz
- Relegated: none
- Europa League: Vaduz
- Matches: 180
- Goals: 595 (3.31 per match)
- Top goalscorer: Aldin Turkeš (22 goals)
- Biggest home win: Lausanne-Sport 5–0 Lausanne-Ouchy; Lausanne-Sport 5–0 Schaffhausen; Lausanne-Sport 5–0 Wil; Grasshopper 5–0 Aarau
- Biggest away win: Winterthur 0–6 Lausanne-Sport; Grasshopper 0–6 Winterthur
- Highest scoring: Aarau 5–4 Lausanne-Sport
- Highest attendance: 9'000 (Winterthur 1–1 Grasshopper)

The 2019–20 Swiss Challenge League (referred to as the Brack.ch Challenge League for sponsoring reasons) was the 17th season of the Swiss Challenge League, the second tier of competitive football in Switzerland, under its current name. The season started on 20 July 2019 and was scheduled to end on 20 May 2020. The league was on winter break between 15 December 2019 and 24 January 2020.

On 28 February Swiss Football League postponed all Super and Challenge League matches of matchdays 24, 25 and 26. Postponement came after the Swiss Federal Council banned all major events until 15 March due to the COVID-19 outbreak. On 13 March Super and Challenge League football was halted at least until the end of April. The league eventually resumed on 19 June. The last regular games were played on 2 August 2020.

== Participating teams ==
A total of 10 teams participated in the league. 2018–19 Swiss Challenge League champions Servette FC were promoted to the 2019–20 Swiss Super League. They were replaced by Grasshopper Club Zürich, who got relegated after finishing last-placed in the 2018–19 Swiss Super League. Rapperswil-Jona was relegated after finishing 10th. They were replaced by FC Stade Lausanne-Ouchy, who won promotion from the 2018–19 Swiss Promotion League.

=== Stadia and locations ===
Locations of clubs in the 2019–20 Challenge League

| Team | Location | Stadium | Capacity |
|---|---|---|---|
| FC Aarau | Aarau | Stadion Brügglifeld | 8,000 |
| FC Chiasso | Chiasso | Stadio Comunale Riva IV | 5,000 |
| Grasshopper Club Zürich | Zürich | Letzigrund | 26,104 |
| SC Kriens | Kriens | Stadion Kleinfeld | 5,360 |
| FC Lausanne-Sport | Lausanne | Stade olympique de la Pontaise | 15,850 |
| FC Schaffhausen | Schaffhausen | LIPO Park Schaffhausen | 8,200 |
| FC Stade Lausanne-Ouchy | Nyon (Note: Stade-Lausanne-Ouchy's home stadium Stade Juan-Antonio-Samaranch in Lausanne can not accommodate SLO for the Challenge League. SLO will play at the Centre sportif de Colovray in Nyon.) | Centre Sportif de Colovray | 7,200 |
| FC Vaduz | (Liechtenstein) Vaduz | Rheinpark Stadion | 7,584 |
| FC Wil 1900 | Wil | IGP Arena | 6,958 |
| FC Winterthur | Winterthur | Schützenwiese | 8,550 |

=== Personnel ===
| Team | Manager |
|---|---|
| Aarau | (Switzerland) Stephan Keller |
| Chiasso | (Switzerland) Alessandro Mangiarratti (1ª-13ª) (Italy) Andrea Manzo (14ª-) (Italy) Alessandro Lupi (24ª-) |
| Grasshoper | (Hungary) Zoltán Kádár |
| Kriens | (Switzerland) Bruno Berner |
| Lausanne | (Switzerland) Giorgio Contini |
| Lausanne-Ochy | (Switzerland) Urs Meier (Italy) Stefano Maccoppi |
| Schaffhausen | (Switzerland) Murat Yakin |
| (Liechtenstein) Vaduz | (Liechtenstein) Mario Frick |
| Wil | (Switzerland) Ciriaco Sforza |
| Winterthur | (Germany) Ralf Loose |

== League table ==
| Pos | Team | Pld | W | D | L | GF | GA | GD | Pts | Promotion or relegation |
|---|---|---|---|---|---|---|---|---|---|---|
| 1 | Lausanne (C, P) | 36 | 22 | 7 | 7 | 84 | 36 | +48 | 73 | Promotion to 2020–21 Swiss Super League |
| 2 | Vaduz (Note: Vaduz were selected to play in the 2020–21 UEFA Europa League by the Liechtenstein Football Association.) (O, P) | 36 | 18 | 10 | 8 | 78 | 53 | +25 | 64 | Qualification for the Europa League first qualifying round and for the promotion/relegation play-offs |
| 3 | Grasshopper | 36 | 17 | 10 | 9 | 69 | 52 | +17 | 61 | |
| 4 | Winterthur | 36 | 15 | 10 | 11 | 56 | 58 | −2 | 55 | |
| 5 | Kriens | 36 | 16 | 6 | 14 | 58 | 59 | −1 | 54 | |
| 6 | Wil | 36 | 14 | 7 | 15 | 60 | 61 | −1 | 49 | |
| 7 | Lausanne-Ouchy | 36 | 11 | 9 | 16 | 47 | 64 | −17 | 42 | |
| 8 | Aarau | 36 | 10 | 11 | 15 | 65 | 80 | −15 | 41 | |
| 9 | Schaffhausen | 36 | 6 | 14 | 16 | 34 | 62 | −28 | 32 | |
| 10 | Chiasso | 36 | 5 | 8 | 23 | 44 | 70 | −26 | 23 | |

Source: Swiss Challenge League
Rules for classification: 1) Points; 2) Goal difference; 3) Goals scored; 4) Head-to-head goal difference; 5) Away goals scored; 6) Draw.
(C) Champions; (O) Play-off winners; (P) Promoted

== Results ==
=== First and Second Round ===
| Home \ Away | AAR | CHI | GCZ | KRI | LAS | SLO | SHA | VAD | WIL | WIN |
|---|---|---|---|---|---|---|---|---|---|---|
| Aarau | — | 3–3 | 1–2 | 4–1 | 1–3 | 1–1 | 3–1 | 2–2 | 1–0 | 2–2 |
| Chiasso | 4–2 | — | 0–1 | 0–1 | 3–2 | 2–2 | 0–1 | 2–2 | 0–1 | 0–2 |
| Grasshopper | 0–0 | 3–2 | — | 2–0 | 1–2 | 2–1 | 0–1 | 3–3 | 3–0 | 2–2 |
| Kriens | 2–3 | 2–0 | 1–2 | — | 1–2 | 3–0 | 2–2 | 1–0 | 2–1 | 3–2 |
| Lausanne | 5–1 | 3–0 | 2–1 | 4–0 | — | 5–0 | 5–0 | 0–2 | 5–0 | 0–0 |
| Lausanne-Ouchy | 0–2 | 3–0 | 0–1 | 2–1 | 3–0 | — | 2–0 | 3–3 | 0–3 | 1–2 |
| Schaffhausen | 0–0 | 1–0 | 1–1 | 0–2 | 2–2 | 0–1 | — | 0–3 | 3–3 | 1–1 |
| Vaduz | 5–2 | 4–2 | 2–2 | 1–2 | 1–2 | 5–1 | 2–0 | — | 4–2 | 0–1 |
| Wil | 3–0 | 1–4 | 0–1 | 2–0 | 2–2 | 2–0 | 1–1 | 4–1 | — | 4–0 |
| Winterthur | 1–1 | 2–1 | 1–1 | 0–2 | 0–6 | 1–2 | 3–1 | 1–0 | 0–3 | — |

Source: Swiss Challenge League (in German)
Legend: Blue = home team win; Yellow = draw; Red = away team win.

=== Third and Fourth Round ===
| Home \ Away | AAR | CHI | GCZ | KRI | LAS | SLO | SHA | VAD | WIL | WIN |
|---|---|---|---|---|---|---|---|---|---|---|
| Aarau | — | 2–2 | 2–2 | 4–4 | 5–4 | 1–3 | 1–2 | 1–2 | 4–1 | 2–3 |
| Chiasso | 1–3 | — | 1–1 | 2–4 | 0–2 | 3–1 | 1–1 | 1–2 | 2–0 | 0–2 |
| Grasshopper | 5–0 | 2–1 | — | 0–1 | 3–1 | 4–0 | 5–3 | 1–2 | 4–1 | 0–6 |
| Kriens | 4–1 | 4–1 | 4–4 | — | 0–3 | 2–2 | 3–0 | 2–1 | 2–0 | 0–0 |
| Lausanne | 1–0 | 2–1 | 1–0 | 2–0 | — | 0–0 | 1–0 | 1–1 | 5–3 | 1–2 |
| Lausanne-Ouchy | 0–2 | 2–1 | 4–1 | 2–0 | 0–4 | — | 1–1 | 1–1 | 1–2 | 2–2 |
| Schaffhausen | 2–4 | 2–1 | 0–3 | 0–0 | 0–0 | 2–2 | — | 2–2 | 2–3 | 1–0 |
| Vaduz | 1–1 | 0–0 | 2–3 | 4–2 | 2–1 | 5–1 | 3–1 | — | 2–1 | 4–1 |
| Wil | 3–1 | 1–1 | 3–2 | 2–0 | 1–1 | 1–2 | 0–0 | 1–2 | — | 3–1 |
| Winterthur | 5–2 | 3–2 | 1–1 | 4–0 | 0–4 | 1–0 | 1–0 | 1–4 | 2–2 | — |

Source: Swiss Challenge League (in German)
Legend: Blue = home team win; Yellow = draw; Red = away team win.

== Awards ==
Swiss Football League Awards 2019
| Award | Winner | Club |
|---|---|---|
| Player of the Season | (Switzerland) Andi Zeqiri | FC Lausanne-Sport |

Brack.ch Challenge League Dream Team 2019
| Position | Player | Nationality | Club |
|---|---|---|---|
| Goalkeeper | Thomas Castella | Switzerland | FC Lausanne-Sport |
| Defender | Marko Bašić | Croatia | Grasshopper Club Zürich |
| Defender | Nikola Boranijašević | Serbia | FC Lausanne-Sport |
| Defender | Per-Egil Flo | Norway | FC Lausanne-Sport |
| Defender | Noah Loosli | Switzerland | FC Lausanne-Sport |
| Midfielder | Mohamed Doumbia | Ivory Coast | FC Winterthur |
| Midfielder | Stjepan Kukuruzović | Switzerland | FC Lausanne-Sport |
| Midfielder | Markus Neumayr | Germany | FC Aarau |
| Midfielder | Petar Pusic | Switzerland | Grasshopper Club Zürich |
| Forward | Aldin Turkes | Switzerland | FC Lausanne-Sport |
| Forward | Andi Zeqiri | Switzerland | FC Lausanne-Sport |

== Promotion play-offs ==
The ninth-placed team of 2019–20 Swiss Super League, Thun, played against the runners-up of 2019–20 Swiss Challenge League, Vaduz.

=== First leg ===
7 August 2020
18:15

| Vaduz | 2–0 | Thun |
|---|---|---|
| Cicek 45+3'; Sutter 58' | Report |

Rheinpark Stadion, Vaduz
Referee: Alain Bieri

=== Second leg ===
10 August 2020
18:15

| Thun | 4–3 | Vaduz |
|---|---|---|
| Stillhart 41'; Bertone 47'; Munsy 87'; Rapp 90+4' | Report | Coulibaly 19, 51'; Cicek 69' |

Stockhorn Arena, Thun
Referee: Adrien Jaccottet

Vaduz won 5–4 on aggregate and promoted to the Swiss Super League.
