= Isidor Bajić Secondary School of Music =

High school in Novi Sad, Serbia

Isidor Bajić Music School
- Музичка школа "Исидор Бајић"; Muzička škola "Isidor Bajić"

Location
- Cara Lazara Boulevard 67; Novi Sad, South Bačka, Vojvodina; Serbia
- Coordinates: 45.241734°N 19.83421418°E

Information
- School type: Public, Secondary school
- Established: 1 September 1909; 116 years ago
- Status: open
- Principal: Mr Radmila Rakin Martinović
- Teaching staff: 147 teachers, 23 other employees
- Gender: Coeducational
- Enrollment: 1205
- Language: Serbian, English, Italian
- Website: www.isidorbajic.edu.rs

Isidor Bajić Music School (Serbian: Музичка школа "Исидор Бајић", Muzička škola "Isidor Bajić") is a secondary school of music located in the city of Novi Sad, Vojvodina, Serbia. Specifically, it is located at Cara Lazara Boulevard. The school was established on September 1, 1909. It is one of the 15 secondary schools in Novi Sad. The school was named after Isidor Bajić, a famous Serbian composer, pedagogue, and publisher, who was also the school's first principal and instructor of theory.

== History ==
=== Birth of the school ===
The school was founded by Isidor Bajić due to a growing need for more educated musicians in the Novi Sad community, as well the growing popularity for music of higher artistic level among the educated music audiences. Bajić himself was a teacher at both the Central Elementary School and the Serbian Grand Orthodox Gymnasium in Novi Sad (today known as Jovan Jovanović Zmaj Gymnasium), prepared sermons for the occasion of Saint Sava Day in the Lyceum, led three choirs and the singing society Neven, and collaborated on various musical aspects of Serbian National Theater productions. Realizing all of this, Isidor Bajić announced his intention to the public after an initial period of pondering, consulting, and planning:

The Music School (Conservatory) will be open in Novi Sad in September. Our town as well as our children will benefit, as our young generations will have the opportunity to be musically educated by professional musicians, further propelling the cultural progress of this city. We hope the public will joyfully support this new cultural undertaking!

— Isidor Bajić, Novi Sad, 15 May 1909

Isidor Bajić Music School was launched officially on September 1, 1909. Apart from the Music School in Subotica, the new school was at this time the only specialized music school in Serbia north of the Sava and Danube rivers. It quickly rose as a prominent and prestigious music school, attracting many professional musicians of that time to be part of the teaching staff.

The beginning of the First World War and the early death of Isidor Bajić interrupted this progress and resulted in a temporary closing of the School on 15 September 1915. The repercussions of the war resulted in a burdensome and slow reestablishment of the school in the following years.

=== Interwar period ===
In 1919 a question was put forth regarding the founding of an institution which could restore the musical activities of Novi Sad in the spirit of Isidor Bajić's ideas. In 1920, upon the initiation of Vladimir Karakašević, the Music Society was founded with the aim of gathering music lovers from Novi Sad, amateurs as well as professionals, in order to improve the nation's arts. Despite the serious efforts of the Music Society of Novi Sad management, the Isidor Bajić Music School started working again only in 1927, when it became the first half-state music school upon the approval of the Ministry of Education. Numerous problems accompanied and put in jeopardy the work of the School until 1930, when Svetolik Pašćan-Kojanov, a famous conductor, composer and music writer, became the School's Principal. A period of renaissance followed in 1936 when Rikard Švarc was appointed Principal. By 1941, 210 pupils were enrolled in the school, but the successful work was again interrupted by the Second World War.

=== School relocation ===
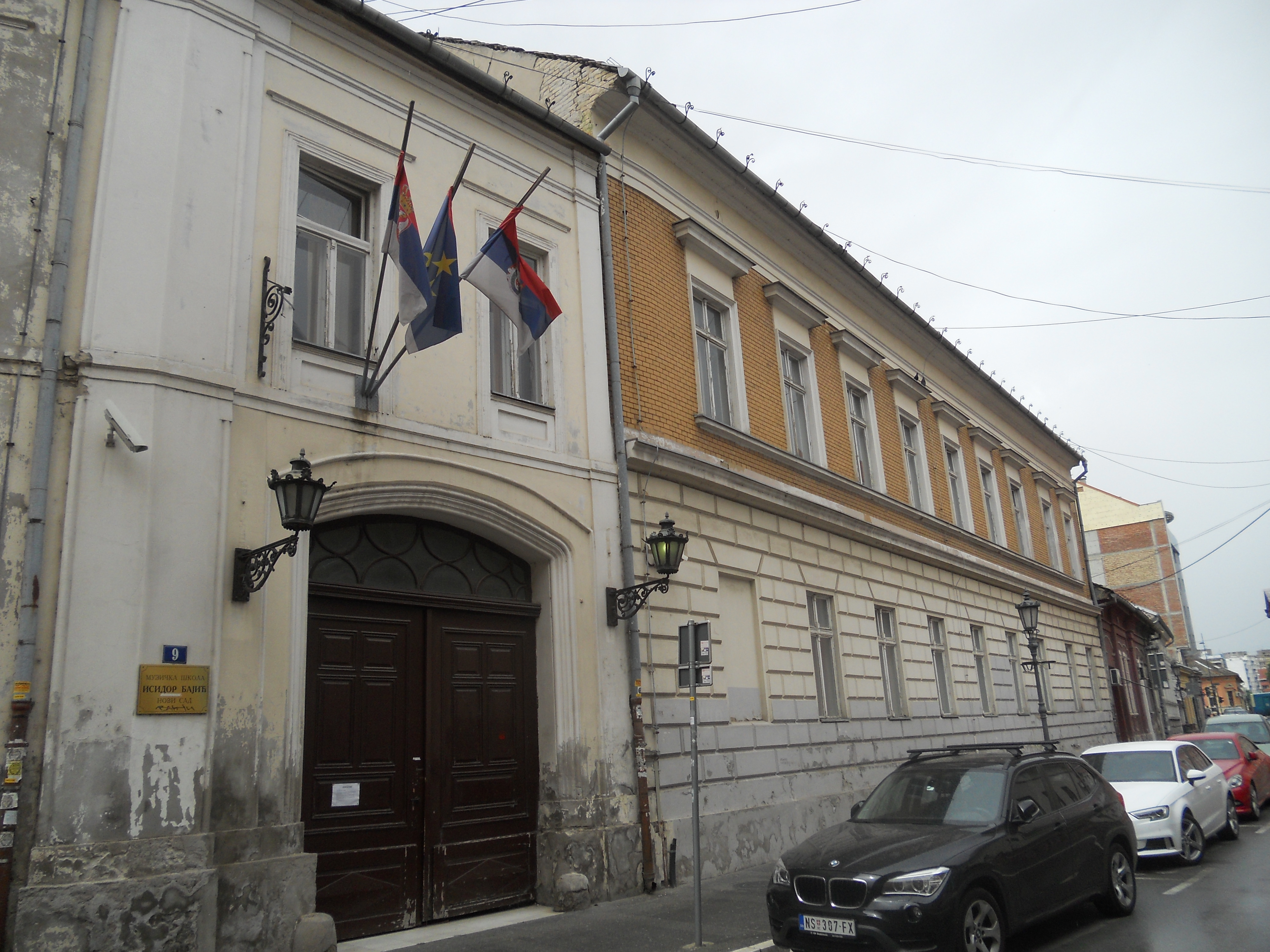
Old building of "Isidor Bajić" Music School in Njegoševa Street

After the Second World War, and upon the proposal of the Local Command Office of the Department of Education, Milutin Ružić was hired to organize and gather teachers so that Music School Isidor Bajić might again begin its work. An experienced staff was joined with and strengthened by the addition younger colleagues, and many other diligent, highly professional, and devoted music pedagogues who ushered in a successful new period in the School's operation. The number of students grew constantly, as did the number of teachers. With such prolific growth, the School soon faced the problem of finding premises large enough for all its classes to be taught. Though this issue remained relevant for several years, it was finally resolved in 1953 when the school was relocated to Njegoševa Street #9. When composer Rudolf Bruči became Principal of the School soon after, another period of constant improvement was born, resulting in 20 years of improved classes and student enrichment, and greater funds for instruments, records, and sheet music.

=== New school building ===
During the time of Principal Mr Radmila Rakin Martinović, the music school finally moved from its old building (which was a temporary location) in Njegoševa Street in Star Grad neighborhood to its new building (built in 2021) at Cara Lazara Boulevard along with the ballet school of Novi Sad (founded in 1947), where they share the same building and cooperate with each other. The new building provides a more quality education environment specifically tailored for musical and ballet arts. One of the schools concert halls are also used by the city during cultural events.

== Educational levels and types ==
The School is divided into several educational levels depending on the age and musical proficiency:

- Music Kindergarten (198 students) – duration: one to two years;
- Elementary Music School (696 students) – duration: two to six years;
- High Music School (238 students) – duration: four years;
- The Futog Branch (73 students)
- Part-time enrollment
- ABRSM (Associated Board of the Royal Schools of Music), member since 2006

== School departments ==
The School is divided into several musical departments:

- Piano Department
- String Department
- Wind Department
- Accordion Department
- Voice Department
- Poly-Instrumental Department
- Music Theory Department

== Principals ==
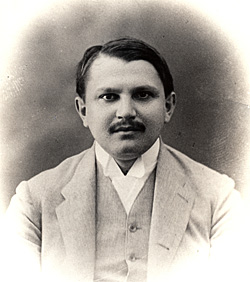
Isidor Bajić (1878–1915), founder and first principal (1909–1915)

- Isidor Bajić, 1909–1915
- Jovan Mikšik
- Svetolik Pašćan-Kojanov, 1930–1936
- Rikard Schwarz, 1936–1941
- Lajoš Kiš
- Milutin Ružić
- Hinko Marzinec
- Anton Tot
- Arsen Triva
- Dušan Stular
- Vera Tošić
- Rudolf Bruči
- Ivan Kovač
- Mirjana Ivković
- Ivan Buljovčić
- Stevan Divjaković
- Mr Radmila Rakin Martinović, 1996–

== Productions ==
In recent decades, the school has produced recorded musical work (on cassette tape and CDs), as well as a historical book about music:

- Audio Cassette,
- "Karmina Burana" music CD from Karla Orfa in 1998,
- "120. godina od rođenja Isidora Bajića" music CD on 4 November 1999,
- "Muzika za Orkestar" and "Horska Muzika" music CDs on 16 May 2001,
- "Ljubav stvara bolji svet" of "Bajićevi slavuji" choir music CD in 2000,
- "Gudački orkestar M.Š. "Isidor Bajić"" music CD,
- Monograph "Novi Sad – a City of Music" by Marija Adamov, Zorana Kolundžije, and Mr Radmila Rakin Martinović in 27. June 2000.

== Accolades ==
Students of the school have achieved success in music competitions in Serbia and abroad, averaging 100 awards per year, and receiving numerous awards for excellent performance and pedagogical achievements. One such example is the "Vuk Stefanovic Karadzic Award", received in 1999 from the Ministry of Education of the Republic of Serbia and Cultural and Educational Society of Serbia.

In 2004, the school and the principal received the New Millennium Award for the Best Trade Name in Madrid for successful work and management in the field of musical education and culture.

In 2007, it received the "Dr Đorđe Natošević" Award.

In music school, pupils are encouraged to work independently and to fulfill their duties, which has great influence on forming children’s characters... Pupils will not only learn how to play the instrument, but they will also be educated how to understand and enjoy music as a science, by learning theory of music scientific disciplines... Music school is a cultural institution that has a very serious task and has public responsibility for fulfilling it successfully.

— Isidor Bajic, Novi Sad, 1909

== Events ==
The school hosts several musical events, competitions, and conferences:

- Isidor Bajić Piano Memorial
- Anton Eberst Competition
- Horn Competition Isidor Bajić
- World Piano Conference

== Cooperation ==
The school cooperates with several organizations, cultural institutions, and musics schools, within Serbia and abroad.

Organizations:

- European Music School Union (EMU) – member since 2006
- Association of Music and Ballet Schools of Serbia
- Associated Board of the Royal Schools of Music (ABRSM)
- European Piano Teachers Association (EPTA)
- EPTA Serbia
- EPTA Voyvodina

Cultural Institutions:

- Jeunesse Musicale of Novi Sad
- Matica srpska
- Cultural Center of Novi Sad
- Center for Cultural Animation

Music Schools:

- The music schools of Serbia
- Vida Matjan Music School, Kotor, Crna Gora
- Fran Korun-Kozeljski Music School, Velenje, Slovenija
- Siklós State Music School, Siklós, Hungary
- Mily Balakirev Music School, Moscow, Russia
- Children's Art School No 8, Nizhny Novgorod, Russia
- Norfolk Music Service, Norwich, England
- High School Svetozar Marković, Novi Sad, Serbia
- Ballet School Novi Sad, Serbia (shares the same building)
- School of Design Bogdan Šuput, Novi Sad, Serbia

Sister Schools:

- Dr Miloje Milojević Music School, Kragujevac, Serbia
