= Bukić =

Bukić is a surname. Notable people with the surname include:

- Enver Bukić (1937 – 2017), Slovenian chess grandmaster
- Luka Bukić (born 1994), water polo player from Croatia
- Perica Bukić (born 1966), Croatian former professional water polo player and politician
