= Nešić =

Nešić (Cyrillic script: Нешић) is a Serbian surname. It may refer to:

- Alex Nesic (born 1976), Serbian-American-French actor
- Branko Nešić (born 1934), Serbian-American basketball player
- Dimitrije Nešić (1836-1904), Serbian mathematician
- Đorđe Nešić (1873-1959), Serbian ophthalmologist
- Dragan Nešić (born 1954), Serbian artist
- Marko Nešić (disambiguation)
- Neli Marinova Nešić (born 1971), Serbian rower
- Nemanja Nešić (1988-2012), Serbian rower
- Nenad Nešić (born 1978), Bosnian-Serb politician
- Nikola Nešić (born 1988), Serbian politician
- Svetozar T. Nešić (1851-1927), Serbian colonel
- Vojna Nešić (born 1947), Serbian composer
- Živorad Nešić (born 1943), Serbian politician
