= Mesić (surname) =

Mesić is a Croatian surname.

== Notable people ==
Notable people with the surname include:

- Jasen Mesić (born 1972), Croatian politician
- Marko Mesić (priest) (1640–1713), Croatian priest and soldier
- Marko Mesić (soldier) (1901–1982), Croatian soldier
- Matija Mesić (1826–1878), Croatian historian, the first rector of the University of Zagreb
- Milka Mesić (1939–2024), Croatian public person
- Stjepan Mesić (born 1934), 2nd President of the Republic of Croatia
- Zlatko Mesić (1946–2020), Croatian footballer

== Possible origins ==
The surname Mesić, although relatively common amongst Christian people in Croatia, may have Islamic origins from the time of Turkish (Ottoman) occupation of the Balkans. Mesić is a patronymic from the Bosniak (Muslim Bosnian) personal name Meso, pet form of Mehmed (Muhammad) which is of Turkish and ultimately Arabic origin.

Mesić is also known to be a nickname of someone who eats a lot of meat, deriving from the word "meso" (Croatian for "meat').

It has also been theorized that the surname Mesić possibly originates from the Albanian surname Meksi, and the members of the family which migrated towards Croatia.

== Usage ==
Spelled as Mesić, it is most commonly found in Croatia with roughly 1,046 people bearing the last name.

The name Mesić is often Anglicized/Americanized amongst those in North America as Mesic, Mesick, or Mesich, due to the ć having an accent that is not used in the English language. The -ić patrynomic being changed simply to ic, often has to do with American English speakers reading the name and not knowing how to pronounce the ć sounds.

For early generations of the Balkan diaspora, the "-ić" patrynomic being changed to "ich" had to do with the fact that "many if not most [people of the Balkans] that had emigrated to the US during the latter part of the 19th century came to that country without any knowledge of English language. As they arrived, they would often give their surnames to the authorities verbally, transcription of which were immediately Americanized". The contemporary generations of the Diaspora who arrive in the 21st century may sometimes change their patrynomic to "-ich" to avoid the common mispronunciation of the surname amongst English speakers, in which the "-ić" is pronounced as an English "-ic".

== See also ==
- Mešić
