= Marko Mesić =

Marko Mesić may refer to:

- Marko Mesić (priest) (1640–1713), a Croatian priest and war hero
- Marko Mesić (soldier) (1901–1982), a Croatian soldier in the Royal Yugoslav Army and the Wehrmacht

== See also ==
- Mesić (disambiguation)
