= Mešić =

Mešić is a Bosnian surname, a patronymic derived from the masculine given name Meša, itself a diminutive of Mehmed. It may refer to:

- Ademaga Mešić (1868–1945), Bosnian politician and military officer
- Elvis Mešić (born 1981), Bosnian footballer
- Kemal Mešić (born 1985), Bosnian athlete
- Mirnes Mešić (born 1978), Bosnian footballer
- Mirza Mešić (born 1980), Bosnian footballer

== See also ==
- Mesić (disambiguation)
- Nešić
