= Marko Lunder =

Slovenian footballer

Personal information
- Date of birth: 20 April 1983 (age 43)
- Place of birth: Ljubljana, SFR Yugoslavia
- Height: 1.75 m (5 ft 9 in)
- Position: Midfielder

Youth career
- Domžale

Senior career*
Years	Team	Apps	(Gls)
2001–2007	Domžale	72	(4)
2002	→ Dob (loan)	10	(2)
2004	→ Radomlje (loan)	5	(2)
2007	Livar	8	(0)
2008–2012	Radomlje	90	(30)
2013–2016	Dob	91	(23)
Total		276	(61)
- * Club domestic league appearances and goals

Marko Lunder (born 20 April 1983) is a Slovenian retired footballer.

== Career ==
Lunder spent much of his career playing for Domžale, and made an appearance in the side's first-round UEFA Cup match against VfB Stuttgart in 2005.
