= Marko Popović =

Marko Popović may refer to:

- Marko Miljanov Popović (1833–1901), Montenegrin-Serbian general and writer
- Marko Popović (basketball, born 1982), Croatian point guard/shooting guard
- Marko Popović (basketball, born 1984), Serbian and Bosnian point guard
- Marko Popović (basketball, born 1985), Montenegrin shooting guard
- Marko Popović (footballer) (born 1982), Serbian soccer player
- Marko Popović (volleyball) (born 1994), Serbian player for club OK Partizan
