= Marko Klasinc =

Slovenian chess problemist (born 1951)

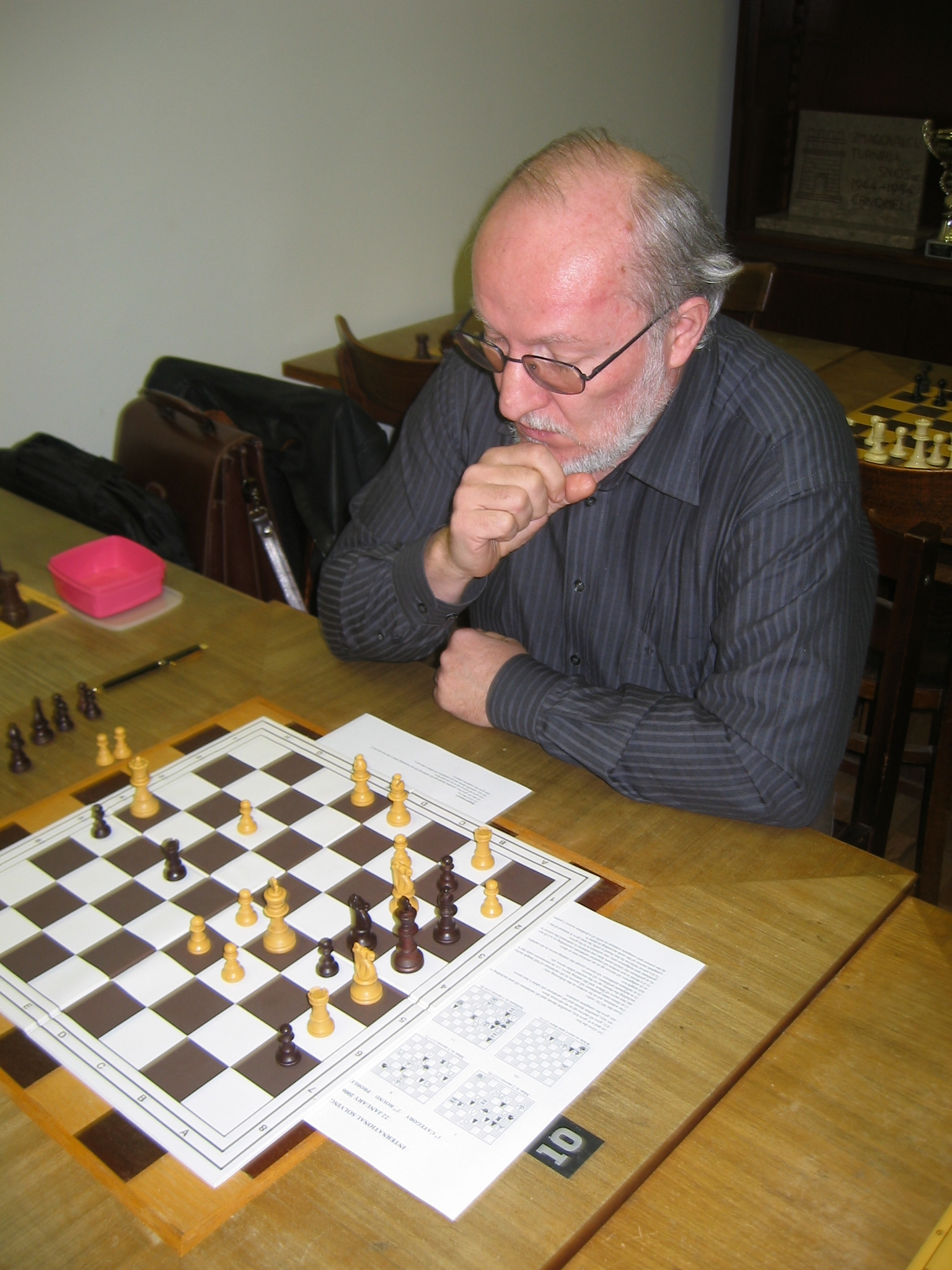
Marko Klasinc

1. pr. Prvenstvo Jugoslavije 1983
Album FIDE 1983-85

Position: h8 black bishop, c7 white bishop, g7 white queen, b6 white king, e6 white knight, g6 black rook, g5 black pawn, b4 white knight, c4 black queen, d4 black pawn, e4 white pawn, f4 black pawn, c3 black pawn, e3 black king, f3 white pawn, g3 black knight, e2 white pawn

Helpmate in 2

a) diagram

b) white Kg8
Solution: a) 1.Rxg7 Nxd4 2. Kxd4 Nc2# b) 1.Qxc7 Nxf4 2. Kxf4 Nd5#

Marko Klasinc (born 14 May 1951) is a Slovenian chess problemist.

He composed almost 200 chess problems, mostly heterodox and retrograde ones (12 included in FIDE Album). He has title FIDE solving master and international judge of FIDE for chess composition. As a good solver he represented Yugoslavia 1982 in Varna, where the team became World Champion solving chess problems.

He is the president of Committee for Chess Compositions of Chess Federation of Slovenia.
