= Marko Bulat =

Marko Bulat may refer to:

- Marko Bulat (singer) (born 1973), Serbian pop-folk singer and musician
- Marko Bulat (footballer), Croatian football midfielder
