= Marko Nešić =

Serbian musician and composer

- Born: March 2, 1873; Novi Sad
- Died: April 30, 1938 (aged 66); Novi Sad
- Citizenship: Serbian
- Occupations: Musician, Composer, music educator, conductor, Esperanto teacher
- Notable work: Neven Kolo, Dones mi vina krčmarice, U Novome Sadu

Marko Nešić (Serbian Cyrillic: Марко Нешић; March 2, 1873 – April 30, 1938) was a Serbian composer and tamburitza musician. He composed a number of folks songs for tambura, such as Neven Kolo, Žabaljka, Bogata sam imam svega and Đuvegije gde ste da ste.

== Biography and work ==
Nešić was born in Novi Sad. He took part in a wide range of activities creating great cultural and social impact, but is most remembered for his stylistic harmonization of folk songs from Vojvodina, which was published at his own expense and sent to tamburica groups and orchestras across Serbia. He played the tamburica (prim) and šargija and was the bandmaster of several tamburica orchestras including Neven, Srbadija, Bratimstvo, Beli Orao, and Excelsior. He created a school for the tamburica, and taught shoemaking, craft printing, and carpentry. From 1890 he was completely devoted to his musical career.

He wrote over 200 songs and instrumental compositions, many of which are considered folk songs. These include: "Žabaljka", "Bogata sam, imam svega" (I am rich, I have everything), "Dones' mi vina krčmarice" (Bring me the wine, bartender), "Idem kući" (I'm going home), "Kukuruzi već se beru" (The corn is already being harvested),"Kad sam bio mlađan lovac ja" (When I was a young hunter), "Neven Kolo", "Đuvegije gde ste da ste" (Grooms, wherever you are), "Majka me psuje" (My mother curses at me), "Prolaze noći" (The nights go by) and "Biće skoro propast sveta" (Soon the world will collapse), which served as the leitmotif for the film Žika Pavlović, and others.

With the tamburica orchestra of Vasa Jovanovic, Nešić appeared in most major cities of Europe and became a supporter of Esperanto. He is the founder of Esperanto Society in Novi Sad, which carries his name.

Nešić died on 30 April 1938. He had been a great supporter of the labor movement, and at his funeral in Almaška cemetery in Novi Sad a large group of workers from various labor organisations gathered with wreaths in tribute.

== See also ==
- NEVEN Serbian Craftsmen Singing Society
- Music of Serbia
- Serbian folk music
