= Marko Jovanović =

Marko Jovanović may refer to:

- Marko Jovanović (basketball) (born 1982), Serbian professional basketball player
- Marko Jovanović (footballer, born 1978), Serbian football forward
- Marko Jovanović (footballer, born 1988), Serbian football defender
