= Marko Tomasović =

Marko Tomasović may refer to:

- Marko Tomasović (boxer) (born 1981), Croatian boxer and kickboxer
- Marko Tomasović (composer) (born 1976), Croatian composer and songwriter
