= Marko Pavlović =

Serbian footballer

Marko Pavlović (Serbian Cyrillic: Марко Павловић; born 30 January 1982) is a Serbian football goalkeeper who played for FK Jagodina. As of 2014, he was goalkeeping coach at the club.

Pavlović has played for FK Jagodina his whole career. He was playing for FK Čukarički younger categories and FK Komgrap. He was playing also for a FK Morava Ribare.
