= Marko Milić =

Marko Milić may refer to:

- Marko Milić (basketball) (born 1977), Slovenian basketball coach and former player
- Marko Milić (footballer) (born 1987), Serbian football player
