= Marko Perović =

Marko Perović may refer to:

- Marko Perović (footballer, born 1972), Serbian football manager and former Yugoslav footballer
- Marko Perović (footballer, born 1984), Serbian football coach and former footballer
- Marko Perović (footballer, born 2006), Montenegrin footballer

== See also ==
- Marko Petrović (1952–2016), Serbian politician
- Marko Petković (born 1992), Serbian footballer
- Marko Petković (water polo) (born 1989), Montenegrin water polo player
- Marko Perković (born 1966), Croatian singer
- Marko Perković (footballer) (born 1991), Croatian footballer
