= Marko Babić =

Marko Babić may refer to:

- Marko Babić (footballer) (born 1981), Croatian international footballer
- Marko Babić (soldier) (1965–2007), Croatian Army officer
