= Marko Sušac =

Bosnian footballer

Personal information
- Date of birth: 23 October 1988 (age 38)
- Place of birth: Mostar, SFR Yugoslavia
- Height: 1.92 m (6 ft 4 in)
- Position: Goalkeeper

Youth career
- –2006: Zrinjski Mostar

Senior career*
Years	Team	Apps	(Gls)
2006–2007	Kamen Ingrad	1	(0)
2007–2008	Međugorje		
2009	Zrinjski Mostar	1	(0)
2009–2010	Borac Banja Luka	4	(0)
2010–2012	Croatia Sesvete	7	(0)
2012	Varaždin	1	(0)
2012–2013	Imotski	5	(0)
2013–2016	GOŠK Gabela	95	(0)
2017–2018	GOŠK Gabela	8	(0)
2018	Vasalund	0	(0)
2018–2019	Newroz		
2019	Metalleghe-BSI	11	(0)
2019	Travnik	7	(0)
2019–2020	Neretvanac Opuzen		
2020	Olimpik	1	(0)

International career
2009–2010	Bosnia and Herzegovina U21	2	(0)
- * Club domestic league appearances and goals as of 23 August 2020

Marko Sušac (born 23 November 1988) is a Bosnian professional footballer who plays as a goalkeeper.

== Club career ==
A much-travelled goalkeeper, Sušac was set to leave Metalleghe-BSI in summer 2019 after a career that led him to clubs in Croatia and Sweden. He left Olimpik in September 2020, after only arriving at the club two months earlier.

== Honours ==
Borac Banja Luka

- Bosnian Cup: 2009–10

GOŠK Gabela

- First League of FBiH: 2016–17
