= Enver Bukić =

Slovenian chess grandmaster (1937–2017)

Personal information
- Born: 2 December 1937 Banja Luka, Bosnia and Herzegovina
- Died: 22 February 2017 (aged 79) Ljubljana, Slovenia

Chess career
- Country: Yugoslavia; Slovenia
- Title: Grandmaster (1976)
- Peak rating: 2500 (January 1976)
- Peak ranking: No. 80 (January 1976)

Enver Bukić (2 December 1937 – 22 February 2017) was a Slovenian chess Grandmaster (GM) (1976). He was European Team Chess Championship silver (1973) and bronze (1977) medalist.

== Biography ==
Enver Bukić was one of the top Yugoslav chess players in the 1970s. He competed many times in the finals of individual Yugoslav Chess Championships, winning silver medals three times (Kraljevo 1967, Poreč 1974, Bor 1976). In the international chess arena, he has achieved successes, among others: in Belgrade (1968, 1st place), Vršac (1975, Borislav Kostić memorial, shared 1st place with Nino Kirov), Ulm (1975, 1st place) and in Tuzla (1979, 1st place).

One of Enver Bukić's most famous games was against world champion Mikhail Tal, played during a match between Yugoslavia and Soviet Union in Budva in 1967.

Enver Bukić played for Yugoslavia in the European Team Chess Championships:

- In 1970, at sixth board in the 4th European Team Chess Championship in Kapfenberg (+1, =6, -0),
- In 1973, at first reserve board in the 5th European Team Chess Championship in Bath (+0, =1, -0) and won team silver medal,
- In 1977, at seventh board in the 6th European Team Chess Championship in Moscow (+2, =3, -1) and won team bronze and individual gold medals.

Enver Bukić played for Yugoslavia in the World Student Team Chess Championships:

- In 1963, at third board in the 10th World Student Team Chess Championship in Budva (+5, =4, -1) and won team silver medal,
- In 1964, at first board in the 11th World Student Team Chess Championship in Kraków (+4, =5, -2).

Enver Bukić played for Yugoslavia in the Men's Chess Balkaniads:

- In 1971, at fourth board in the 3rd Men's Chess Balkaniad in Athens (+1, =1, -1) and won team bronze medal,
- In 1972, at fourth board in the 4th Men's Chess Balkaniad in Sofia (+1, =3, -0) and won team gold and individual silver medals,
- In 1973, at fourth board in the 5th Men's Chess Balkaniad in Poiana Brașov (+2, =1, -1) and won team and individual bronze medals,
- In 1975, at third board in the 7th Men's Chess Balkaniad in Istanbul (+1, =1, -0) and won team and individual gold medals,
- In 1976, at fifth board in the 8th Men's Chess Balkaniad in Athens (+2, =1, -0) and won team and individual gold medals,
- In 1979, at third board in the 11th Chess Balkaniad in Bihać (+2, =3, -0) and won team and individual gold medals.

His career-high chess ranking was on January 1, 1976, with a score of 2,500, split 80th–84th at the time in the world FIDE list, while taking 10th place among Yugoslav chess players. In 1964, he was awarded the FIDE International Master (IM) title and received the FIDE Grandmaster (GM) title twelve years later.

Enver Bukić was an economist by profession.
