= Marko Šimić =

Marko Šimić may refer to:

- Marko Šimić (footballer, born 1985), Croatian football goalkeeper
- Marko Šimić (footballer, born 1988), Croatian football striker

== See also ==
- Marko Simić (disambiguation)
