= Marko Nikolić =

Marko Nikolić may refer to:

- Marko Nikolić (actor) (1946–2019), Serbian actor
- Marko Nikolić (footballer, born June 1989) (born 1989), Serbian footballer for VfB Forstinning
- Marko Nikolić (footballer, born August 1989) (born 1989), Serbian footballer for Kolonija Kovin on loan from Smederevo
- Marko Nikolić (footballer, born 1997), Swedish footballer for Jönköpings Södra
- Marko Nikolić (football manager) (born 1979), Serbian football manager
- Marko Nikolić (footballer, born 1998), Serbian footballer for Turan
