= Mesić =

Mesić may refer to:

== People ==
- Mesić (surname)

== Places ==
- Mesić (Vršac), a village in Banat, Vojvodina, Serbia
- Mesić Monastery, a monastery in Banat, Vojvodina, Serbia

== See also ==
- Mesic (disambiguation)
