= Nemanja Nešić =

Serbian rower

- Born: Nemanja Nešić; 15 May 1988; Smederevo, Serbia (then Yugoslavia)
- Died: 6 June 2012 (aged 24); Smederevo, Serbia
- Occupation: rower
- Years active: 2001–2012

Olympic medal record

Representing Serbia

European Championships
Bronze medal – third place	2011 Plovdiv	LM4−
Bronze medal – third place	2009 Brest	LM4−

Nemanja Nešić (Serbian Cyrillic: Немања Нешић) (15 May 1988 – 6 June 2012) was a Serbian rower. He was a member of the national teams of Serbia in the last eight years, won two bronze medals at European Championship 2009, and in 2011, world championships finalist and participant in many important international regattas.

He died unexpectedly in a boat during the morning training in 2012.
