= Marko Kaljuveer =

Estonian journalist

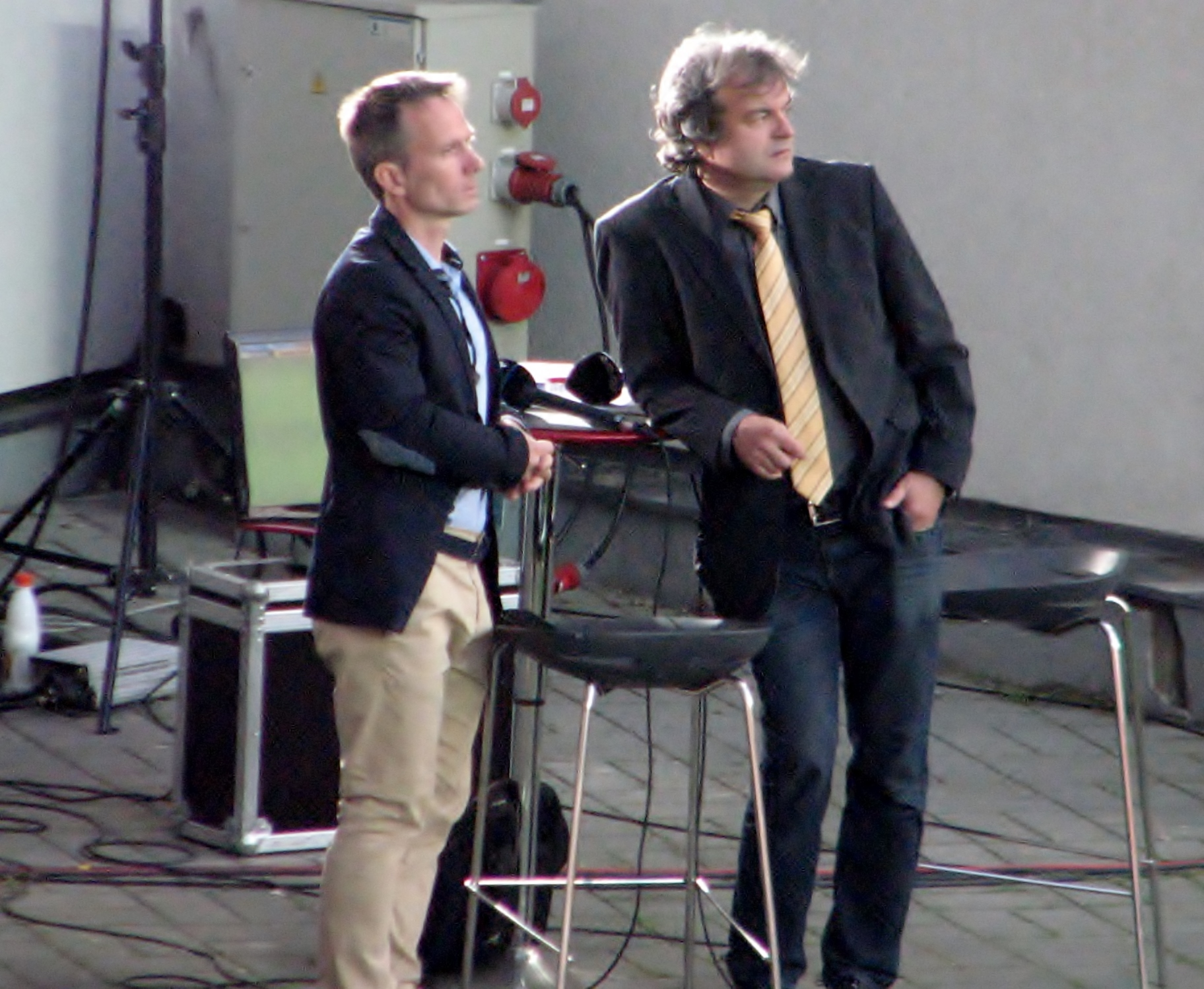
Marko Kaljuveer (right) and Martin Reim

Marko Kaljuveer (born 8 November 1964) is an Estonian sports journalist.

He was born in Tallinn. In 1997 he graduated from the University of Tartu with a degree in Estonian philology.

From 1989 until 2000, he was editor of Eesti Televisioon's (ETV) sports department, and from 2001 until 2014, the head of the department.

From 2015 until 2017, he was the president of Estonian Golf Association. 2016-2020 he was a member of Executive Committee of Estonian Olympic Committee. 2016-2020 he was the chief producer of the company Eesti Meedia.
