= NEVEN (cultural society) =

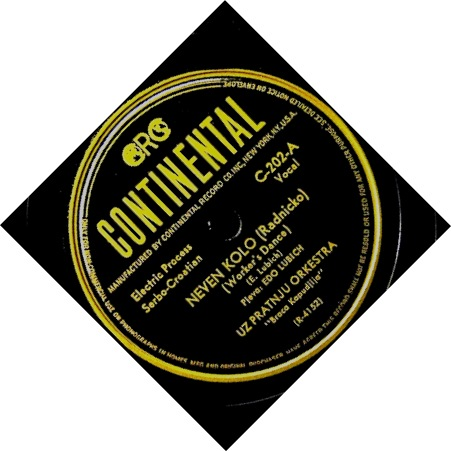
old vinyl "NEVEN KOLO"

The NEVEN Serbian Craftsmen Singing Society (Serbian: Српско Занатлијско Певачко Друштво НЕВЕН/Srpsko zanatlijsko pevačko društvo NEVEN) is a cultural society in Novi Sad, Serbia. It is one of the oldest cultural societies in Serbia. The first president of the society was Aleksandar (Šandor) Subotić and the first conductor was Mita Nešić.

== History ==
=== Foundation and early history ===
The Serbian Craftsmen Singing Society "NEVEN" or simply SZPD "Neven" Novi Sad, was officially registered in 1900 by the decision of the Royal Austro-Hungarian Ministry and approved on the basis of social rules. However, the first ideas and preparations for creation of this society started as early as in 1893. Since that year, Serb craftsmen youth tried to officially register the society, but was rejected by Austro-Hungarian authorities, which did not approved parts of the proposed society's Rules (Statute) that said that society will cherish Serb songs and dance, Serb spirituality and Serb customs. The proposed Rules were sent to Budapest five times and five times were returned. In 1899, the management of the society asked Jaša Tomić for help regarding the registration issue, and after Tomić reworked and prepared the Rules, they were sent to Budapest and were finally approved.

Name of the society, "Neven", comes from a Serbian name for a flower marigold (Latin: Calendula officinalis). Name of the flower ("neven") means "does not fade" in Serbian and founders of the society gave this name to the society hoping that the society will also never fade i.e. that it will not cease to exist. It is not recorded who exactly proposed the name of the flower for the society.

The society was a member of the Alliance of Serb Singing Societies in Austria-Hungary, which was established in 1910 and which included 47 societies. In the beginning of the First World War, the Austro-Hungarian authorities abolished the society. During the war, due to extensive society's activity in the cherishing of the Serb culture, almost entire documentation of the society was burned and destroyed, while clothes and instruments were stolen. Members of the society that survived war-time years reestablished the society in 1919, after the collapse of Austria-Hungary and establishment of the Kingdom of Serbs, Croats and Slovenes.

Largest success of the society is related to the performance of the choir, which sang in the Orthodox churches in Novi Sad.

=== Celebrating 25 years (1900 - 1925) ===
As a society that cooperated with similar associations, "Neven" had many friends and people of good will who supported its work. Jubilee that marked 25 years of the existence of the society was an opportunity for society's members to gather in one place and to mention and award the deserving individuals. At the time, all companies proudly emphasized his national origin as well as a guild. In Novi Sad, then the "Neven" resulted in the following companies:

1. Children choir "Sv. Jovanske School" St.Mokranjac: "Coastal chants "
2. Serbian Craftsme Singing Society "Neven" St.Mokranjac: "V Rukovet"
3. "Reformed Church Choir" K. Terin: "In celebration of "
4. "Musical Society" -Beograd P. Konjevic, "Seljančica" St.Mokranjac, "Kozar"
5. Singing Society of Evangelical Youth "Jugendhor"
6. Serbian Singing Society "Lira" -Next
7. Singing Musical Society "Vardar" - Skopje
8. "Guild of Serbian Singing Society " - Old Bečej St.Mokranjac:" IX Rukovet "
9. "The Serbian and the Guild of Voluntary Educational Cooperative" - Pancevo
10. "Guild of Serbian Singing Society" - Sombor
11. "Kragujevac and Singing Volunteer Fire Fellowship" - Kragujevac
12. "Frosina" - Beograd
13. Serbian Singing Society "Maple" - Vukovar
14. Serbian Singing Society "Dodgeball" - Subotica
15. "The Serbian Singing Society" - Ruma
16. "The children Kindergartens" - Gospođinci
17. Men Choir "Of the Royal National High School" - Beograd

=== Development until 1960s ===
On the Oplenac in 1934. the Serbian Craftsmen Singing Society "Neven" held a memorial to King Alexander I Karadjordjevic.

The most successful of societies are related to the choir, which is the period between two world wars constantly counted 80 singers. Thanks to excellent conductors like John Judla, Daniel Hruza, Joseph Bernstein, Emanuel Dragon, Isidor Bajic, George Gajina, Svetolik Pascan - Kojanov, Paul Figurovski, Branko Cenejac and Djordje Sijakov, "Neven" is performed by Oplenac from Sombor, Cetinje, Dubrovnik, Sarajevo and Bitola. And in Novi Sad is the quality of singing was "singing championship" in all Orthodox churches.

Social and glory of St. George that day in the morning to gather membership mark.

SZPD "Neven" worked during World War II to the Rules in Hungarian - the language of the occupying power, and after the war he worked under the name Craft Cultural Artistic Society "Neven" until the end of 1960. After the war, the disintegration OKUD "George Zlicic" increases the number of members.

Very active in Choir, Drama section (whose black and white photographs displayed), Orchestra and Folklore. Result in system failure occurred because the new government bothered Orthodox orientation of society, and are under the deception story that will form a new institution which will involve many companies, ordered to ZKUD "Neven" stops working. This new institution called Youth Club "Art" - a few years after the termination of "Neven" and quits itself. Complete two sets of clothes and tambura instruments owned by "Neven" are stored in the depot SAP Vojvodina, was formed in 1964 when Artistic Association "Sonja Marinkovic" at the University of Novi Sad - that they were given as fixed assets. Thus, after 60 years has ceased to operate one of the oldest and most respected companies in Novi Sad. Attempts to restore operation failed results and Novi Sad SZPD "Neven" is forgotten.

=== Reactivation in 1995 ===
The labor was at the proposal of Miodrag Cvetković Banjac, rebuilt a group of 30 amateurs (after the collapse of CAS "Maksim Gorky") in 1996, called Cultural and Artistic Society "Neven" abbreviated CAS "Neven". Choreographers were the first Attila Rozmaring and died Darko Relić. The first Board consisted of: secretary Tijana Kugli, Vladimir Harhaji, Milorad Ićitović, Mihajlo Senderak, Ivica Gubić, Dragan Titelac and president Dragan Panjković. The Society has unsuccessfully attempted to return his property in the building which is known by everyone of Novi Sad as a Craft House but still could not reach him. Due to frequent changes in workplaces, dissatisfied members went to other cultural and artistic societies that they offered better working conditions. Thus, from 250 members by 2006. was only 90.
01.11. 2006. were the extraordinary Assembly which adopted a new statute and returned the original name to society.
2012. should be out of print monographs on the occasion of 120 years of "Neven".

== Name of the society in various languages ==
Serbian Craftsmen Singing Society NEVEN
Српско Занатлијско Певачко Друштво НЕВЕН
Szerb Inekor Iparos Egyesűlet NEVEN
Srpsko Obrtničko Pjevačko Društvo NEVEN
Serbicher Handwerkergesangsverein NEVEN
Associazione Serba di Artigiani Cantati NEVEN
Association Serbe des Artisans Chanteurs NEVEN
Asociacőn de Canto de Artesanos de Serbia NEVEN
Σéρβικοσ Καλλιτεηνικοσ Συλλογοσ Μουσικηισ NEVEN
Сербское Ремесленное Певческое Обществое НЕВЕН
Serbskie Towarzystwo Pieśni izb Rzemieślniczych NEVEN

== Presidents ==
Presidents
(1893/96)	Aleksandar Subotić
(1896/97)	Milan Vinokić tailor
(1897/99)	Milan Raonić
(1899/03)	Radoslav Horvat teacher
( )	Đorđe Mihajlović
( /06)	Sava Stojković craftsman
( )	Giga Latinčić
(1906/20)	Jovan Živojinović professor
(1920/21)	Žarko Slepčević; Head of the First Serbian Savings
(1921/23)	Milan Popić pharmacist
(1925/30)	dr Branislav Borota lawyer
(1930/33)	dr Raduško Ilijć lawyer
(1933/34)	Jovan Pervaz building contractor
(1934/37)	Alimpije Popović archpriest
(1937/41)	dr Dimitrije Kirilović; Head of the State Archive
(1950/58)	Stevan Đomparić tinsmither
(1958/60)	Milan Nedić
(1995/06)	Dragan Panjković precision mechanic
(2006/10)	Svetozar Popov lawyer
(2010/ )	

== Neven Kolo composition ==
Neven Kolo (give footage from 1925) is a composition by the famous Novi Sad and Serbian hairdresser, Socialists and Esperantists Marko Nešić In 1911 he composed and wrote the inscription: "..to Craftsmen Singing Society "Neven". This composition is in the last hundred years accepted by the people, and today few people know that its composer Marko Nešić and that is anthem of SZPD "Neven".

== See also ==
- Serbian culture
- Serbs in Vojvodina
- www.szpdneven
