= Ivan Buljovčić =

Serbian chess player

Personal information
- Born: 27 December 1936 Subotica, Serbia
- Died: 10 January 2004 (aged 67) Subotica, Serbia

Chess career
- Country: Yugoslavia; Serbia
- Title: International Master (1974)
- Peak rating: 2460 (May 1974)

Ivan Buljovčić (Serbian: Иван Буљовчић; 27 December 1936 – 10 January 2004) was a Serbian chess International Master (IM, 1974). He was European Team Chess Championship silver medalist (1965).

== Biography ==
Ivan Buljovčić was born in Subotica to an ethnic Croat family. He graduated from the school in Subotica and the Faculty of Music and Education Belgrade Academy of Music (1960). In 1960-1971 taught music in Sombor, in 1971-1975 - in the Bačka Palanka. From 1975 Deputy Director, in January–May 1978 Acting Director of the Serbian National Theatre in Novi Sad. Then in 1978-1992 director of the Isidor Bajić Secondary School of Music.

Ivan Buljovčić was repeated participant of the Yugoslav Chess Championships in individual and team events. He played for the clubs Spartak (Subotica), Novosadsky chess club (1973-1982, 1987–1994), Sombor chess club, chess club Palich. His best result is 5th place in the 1st league (elite division) of the Yugoslav Team Chess championship with the Sombor chess club.

Ivan Buljovčić was 10 times champion of Vojvodina. In 1974, he was awarded the FIDE International Master (IM) title.

Ivan Buljovčić played for Yugoslavia in the European Team Chess Championship:

- In 1965, at second reserve board in the 3rd European Team Chess Championship in Hamburg (+2, =1, -1) and won team silver medal.

Ivan Buljovčić played for Yugoslavia in the Men's Chess Mitropa Cup:

- In 1976, at first board in the 1st Chess Mitropa Cup in Innsbruck (+1, =2, -0) and won individual gold medal.
