= Marko Bašić =

Marko Bašić may refer to:

- Marko Bašić (footballer, born 1984), Croatian footballer for HNK Šibenik
- Marko Bašić (footballer, born 1988), Croatian footballer for Grasshopper Club Zürich
