= Svetozar Gligorić =

Serbian chess grandmaster (1923–2012)

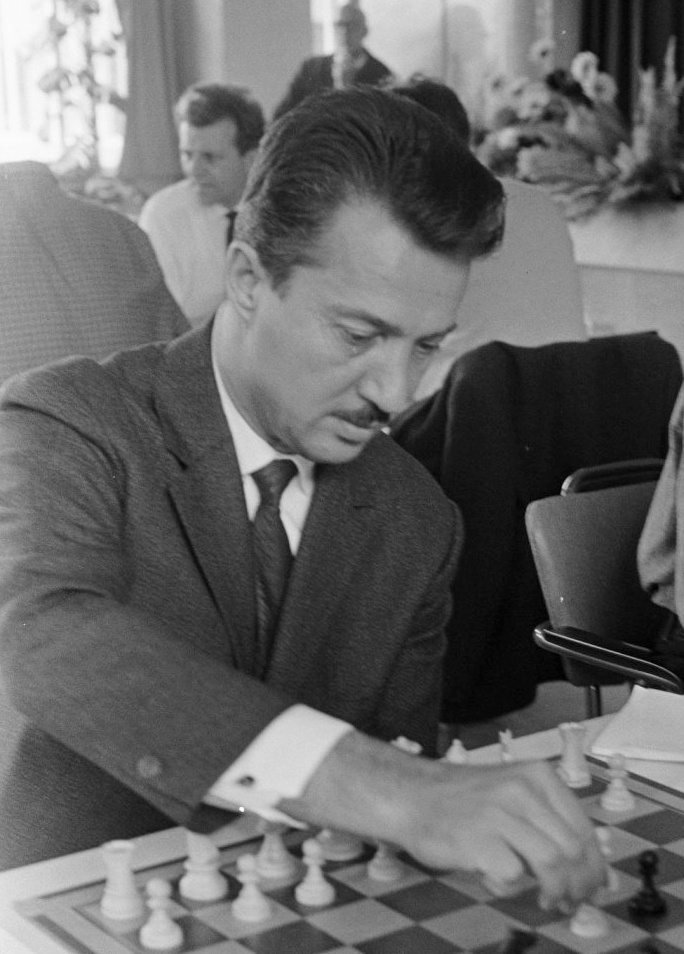
- Gligorić in 1966

Personal information
- Born: 2 February 1923 Belgrade, Kingdom of Serbs, Croats and Slovenes
- Died: 14 August 2012 (aged 89) Belgrade, Serbia

Chess career
- Country: Yugoslavia → Serbia
- Title: Grandmaster (1951)
- Peak rating: 2600 (July 1971)
- Peak ranking: No. 15 (July 1971)

Svetozar Gligorić (Serbian Cyrillic: Светозар Глигорић; 2 February 1923 – 14 August 2012) was a Serbian and Yugoslav chess grandmaster and musician. He won a record 11 titles at Yugoslav Chess Championship, a record 12 team medals at Chess Olympiad, and is considered the best player ever from Serbia and Yugoslavia. In 1958, he received the Golden Badge award for the best athlete of Yugoslavia.

During the 1950s and 1960s, Gligorić was one of the top players in the world reaching the Candidates Tournament three times (1953, 1959, 1968). In his career he won both team (1950) and individual board 1 (1958) gold medals at the Chess Olympiad thus becoming one of the few players in chess history to do so (along with Kashdan, Rubinstein, Botvinnik, Petrosian, Spassky, Karpov, Korchnoi, Kasparov, Ivanchuk, Aronian, Ding, Gukesh and Abdusattorov).

He was also among the world's most popular players, owing to his globe-trotting tournament schedule and a particularly engaging personality, reflected in the title of his autobiography book, I Play Against Pieces (i.e., without hostility toward the opponent; playing "the board and not the man").

== Early years ==
Gligorić was born in Belgrade to a poor family. According to his recollections, his first exposure to chess was as a small child watching patrons play in a neighborhood bar. He began to play at the age of eleven, when taught by a boarder taken in by his mother (his father had died by this time). Lacking a chess set, he made one for himself by carving pieces from corks from wine bottles—a story paralleling the formative years of his contemporary, the renowned Estonian grandmaster Paul Keres.

Gligorić was a good student during his youth, with both academic and athletic successes that famously led to him to be invited to represent his school at a birthday celebration for Prince Peter, who later became King Peter II of Yugoslavia. He later recounted to International Master David Levy (who chronicled his chess career in The Chess of Gligoric) his distress at attending this gala event wearing poor clothing stemming from his family's impoverished condition. His first tournament success came in 1938 when he won the Belgrade Chess Club championship; however, World War II interrupted his chess progress for a time. During the war, Gligorić was a member of a partisan unit. A chance encounter with a chess-playing partisan officer led to his removal from combat. Following the death of his parents, he was adopted in 1940 at the age of 17 by Niko Miljanić.

Following World War II, Gligorić worked for several years as a journalist and organizer of chess tournaments eventually making the transition to full-time chess professional. He continued to progress as a player and in the year of introduction of FIDE titles (1950) he was awarded the International Master title. A year later, Gligorić became a Grandmaster, thus becoming the second Serb to receive this title, after Boris Kostić (1950).

== Chess career ==
Svetozar Gligorić
Medal record

Representing Yugoslavia

Men's chess

Olympiad
Gold medal – first place	1950 Dubrovnik	Open team
Bronze medal – third place	1952 Helsinki	Open team
Bronze medal – third place	1954 Amsterdam	Open team
Silver medal – second place	1956 Moscow	Open team
Silver medal – second place	1958 Munich	Open team
Gold medal – first place	1958 Munich	Individual board 1
Bronze medal – third place	1960 Leipzig	Open team
Silver medal – second place	1962 Varna	Open team
Silver medal – second place	1964 Tel Aviv	Open team
Silver medal – second place	1968 Lugano	Open team
Bronze medal – third place	1970 Siegen	Open team
Bronze medal – third place	1972 Skopje	Open team
Silver medal – second place	1974 Nice	Open team

European Championship
Silver medal – second place	1957 Vienna	Open team
Silver medal – second place	1961 Oberhausen	Open team
Silver medal – second place	1965 Hamburg	Open team
Gold medal – first place	1965 Hamburg	Individual board 2
Bronze medal – third place	1970 Kapfenberg	Individual board 1
Silver medal – second place	1973 Bath	Open team
Gold medal – first place	1973 Bath	Individual board 1
Bronze medal – third place	1977 Moscow	Open team
Gold medal – first place	1980 Skara	Individual board 2
Silver medal – second place	1983 Plovdiv	Open team
Gold medal – first place	1983 Plovdiv	Individual board 2

During the 1950s and 1960s, Gligorić was one of the world's strongest players, with a number of tournament victories to his credit, three participations in the Candidates tournaments and a record 11 Yugoslav chess championships in 1947 (joint), 1948 (joint), 1949, 1950, 1956, 1957, 1958 (joint), 1959, 1960, 1963 and 1966. Thanks to his personality, Gligorić became a lifelong friend of many well-known and skilled chess players such as Bobby Fischer, Tigran Petrosian, Efim Geller, Mikhail Botvinnik, Mikhail Tal and Miguel Najdorf.

He represented his native Yugoslavia with great success in fifteen Chess Olympiads between 1950 and 1982 (thirteen times on first board). In the first post-World War II Olympiad, on home soil at Dubrovnik 1950, Gligorić played on board 1 and led Yugoslavia to a historic result, the team gold medal.

This was during a golden age of Serbian chess, a period when Yugoslavia (led by Serbian grandmasters like Gligorić, Ivkov, Trifunović, Matanović, Matulović, Ljubojević etc.) was among the top three chess countries in the world which led to Gligorić becoming the man with the most team medals in the history of the Chess Olympiad (12). His best individual result was the gold medal on board 1 at the 1958 Olympiad in Munich ahead of reigning world champion Mikhail Botvinnik and former world champion Max Euwe. With this medal Gligorić became one of only 13 players with both team and individual board 1 gold medals at Chess Olympiad.

On top of that, he was very successful at European championship as well winning 6 team medals and 5 board medals, including individual board 1 gold medal that he won in 1973 together with Boris Spassky.

His list of first-place finishes in international chess competitions is one of the longest and includes such events as Liberation Tournament 1945/46 (ahead of Milan Vidmar), Warsaw 1947 (ahead of Smyslov and Boleslavsky), Mar del Plata 1950 and 1953 (ahead of the entire silver medal winning Argentina 1952 Olympic team: Najdorf, Bolbochan, Eliskases, Pilnik and Rossetto), Stockholm 1954, Dallas 1957 (tied with Reshevsky, ahead of Szabo, Larsen and Najdorf), Belgrade 1962 (ahead of Ivkov) and 1969 (tied with Ivkov and Polugaevsky ahead of Geller and Botvinnik), Tel Aviv 1966, Manila 1968, Lone Pine (California) 1972 and 1979, Staunton Memorial 1951, Sarajevo 1962 (tied with Portisch), Los Angeles 1974 and many others. He was also a regular competitor in the series of great tournaments held at Hastings, with wins (or ties for first) in 1951–52, 1956–57, 1959–60, 1960–61 and 1962–63. His five wins and shared wins at Hastings remains a record for the event.

Some other notable results include second place in Buenos Aires 1955 (behind Ivkov, ahead of Pilnik and Szabo), Hastings 1957/58 (behind Paul Keres), Zurich 1959 (ahead of Keres and Fischer but ½ point behind Tal), Hastings 1961/62 (behind Botvinnik), Reykjavik 1964 (behind Tal), great tournament in Zagreb 1970 (ahead of Petrosian, tied with Smyslov, Korchnoi and Hort, behind Fischer), Vinkovci 1970 (behind Larsen, tied with Bronstein and Hort, ahead of Petrosian and Taimanov), and Wijk aan Zee 1971 (tied with Petrosian, behind Korchnoi). Gligorić was also third in Mar del Plata 1955, very strong Bled 1961 tournament (ahead of Geller and Najdorf, tied with Keres and Petrosian, behing Fischer and Tal) and Havana 1952 (behind Najdorf and Reshevsky), as well as fourth in Capablanca Memorial 1962 (tied with Smyslov, behind Najdorf, Spassky and Polugaevsky), Belgrade 1964 (behind Spassky, Korchnoi and Ivkov, ahead of Larsen, Matanović and Bronstein), San Antionio 1972 (ahead of Keres and Hort, behind Portisch, Karpov and Petrosian), Amsterdam 1950 (ahead of Pilnik, Euwe and Tartakower, tied with Pirc, behind Najdorf, Reshevsky and Stahlberg) and in the 1956 Alekhine Memorial Tournament held in Moscow. Sixteen leading grandmasters took part in this prestigious tournament, which made Gligorić's result even more valuable. The fact that Gligorić finished behind Mikhail Botvinnik, Vasily Smyslov and Mark Taimanov, but ahead of David Bronstein, Miguel Najdorf and Paul Keres lead Bronstein to claim that Gligorić was one of the top three players in the world at that moment.

His record in world championship qualifying events was mixed. He was a regular competitor in Zonal and Interzonal competitions with several successes, e.g. zonal wins in 1951, 1960 (joint), 1963, 1966, and 1969 (joint) and 8 participations in the interzonal tournaments between 1948 and 1973 with his best result coming in 1958 when he was 2nd, half a point behind the future world champion, Mikhail Tal. During this period, the Serbian grandmaster missed only one of these tournaments in 1955. Successful performances at interzonal level in 1952, 1958 and 1967 enabled him to participate in Candidates Tournaments the following years. He wasn't able to win any of those Candidates events, however, finishing 13th in the 1953, 5th in 1959 and with 3½–5½ loss against Mikhail Tal in the quarterfinals of the 1968 Candidates match series.

Two years later, in 1970, Gligorić participated in one of the greatest chess events of all time, The Match of the Century – USSR versus the Rest of the World. That year, Belgrade gathered literally all the best players in the world from both sides of the Iron Curtain, among them Gligorić, who played on the fifth board for Team World. The Soviets, more difficult than expected, confirmed their superiority with a score of 20½–19½.

In 1973 Gligorić won his fourth silver medal at the European team championship seasoned with his third individual European medal – the already mentioned gold on the first board together with Boris Spassky. A year later Gligorić won another silver at Chess Olympiad, his 12th and last Olympiad team medal, and even though he was 51 years old his career was not over.

In the following years, Gligorić will achieve notable results at the 1975 Yugoslav Chess Championship (2nd, tied with Ljubojević and Matanović, half a point behind Velimirović), 1975 Vidmar Memorial (2nd, behind Karpov, ahead of Hort, Ribli and Portisch), 1977 Torneo Del Vino (1st, ahead of Byrne, Taimanov and Andersson), 1978 Torneo Del Vino (2nd, tied with Hort, behind Spassky) and 1981 Lone Pine (2nd behind Korchnoi). Gligorić achieved an impressive result at the 1982 Yugoslav Championship when he finished in second place, half a point behind one of the best-ranked chess players in the world, Ljubomir Ljubojević. One of his last notable international appearances Gligorić had at the Chigorin Memorial in 1986, a tournament he won together with Beliavsky and Vaganian, ahead of Tal, Geller and Smyslov. Adding to the individual success are two more European medals with the national team (bronze in 1977 and silver in 1983) and two more individual golds on the second board (1980 and 1983).

== Yugoslav chess championship results ==
Gligorić made his first national top-level appearance in 1945 at the first post-war championship of Yugoslavia. In the following decades, Gligorić would win a record 11 titles. In total, he was among the top three players in the Yugoslav championship 18 times, which is an all time record.

- 1945: 16/23 (+14−5=4), 2nd place, champion Petar Trifunović
- 1946: 12/18 (+9−3=6), 2nd place, champion Petar Trifunović
- 1947: 12½/17 (+10−2=5), champion, shared with Petar Trifunović
- 1948: 12½/17 (+11−3=3), champion, shared with Vasja Pirc
- 1949: 14/19 (+9−0=10), champion
- 1950: 11½/17 (+6−0=11), champion
- 1951: 10½/19 (+5−3=11), 7th place, champion Braslav Rabar
- 1952: 12/19 (+8−3=8), 3rd place, shared with Borislav Milić and Mijo Udovčić, champion Petar Trifunović
- 1953: 10½/17 (+6−2=9), 4th place, shared with Borislav Milić and Dragoljub Janošević, champion Vasja Pirc
- 1955: 11/17 (+5−0=12), 2nd place, champion Nikola Karaklajić
- 1956: 14/19 (+9−0=10), champion
- 1957: 15½/22 (+9−0=13), champion
- 1958: 12½/19 (+7−1=11), champion, shared with Borislav Ivkov
- 1959: 11½/17 (+7−1=9), champion
- 1960: 13/17 (+9−0=8), champion
- 1963: 9½/13 (+7−1=5), champion
- 1965: 12/19 (+7−2=10), 2nd place, shared with Bruno Parma, champion Milan Matulović
- 1966: 12/18 (+8−2=8), champion
- 1975: 12/19 (+6−1=12), 2nd place, shared with Ljubomir Ljubojević and Aleksandar Matanović, champion Dragoljub Velimirović
- 1982: 11/17 (+7−2=8), 2nd place, champion Ljubomir Ljubojević
- 1984: 7½/16 (+3−4=9), 12th place, champion Predrag Nikolić
- 1986: 10/17 (+3−0=14), 6th place, champion Dragan Barlov
- 1990: 6½/15 (+2−4=9), 12th place, champion Zdenko Kožul
- 1991: 8½/13 (+6−2=5), 8–12 place, champion Branko Damljanović

== World Chess Championship results ==
In the World Chess Championship cycles, Gligorić played in 8 Interzonal tournaments from 1948 to 1973 missing only one in 1955.

- 1948 Stockholm: 9½/19 (+5−5=9), tied 11th–13th place out of 20
- 1952 Stockholm: 12½/20 (+9−4=7), 8th place out of 21
- 1958 Portorož: 13/20 (+8−2=10), 2nd place out of 21
- 1962 Stockholm: 13½/22 (+7−2=13), 8th place out of 23
- 1964 Amsterdam: 14/23 (+9−4=10), 10th place out of 24
- 1967 Sousse: 14/21 (+7−0=14), 4th place out of 22
- 1970 Palma de Mallorca: 13/23 (+7−4=12), 10th place out of 24
- 1973 Leningrad: 8½/17 (+5−5=7), 8th–10th out of 18

Successful performances at interzonal level in 1952, 1958 and 1967 enabled him to participate in Candidates Tournaments the following years while narrowly missed the Candidates in 1962 and 1965.

- 1953 Candidates Tournament: 12½/28 (+5−8=15), 13th place out of 15
- 1959 Candidates Tournament: 12½/28 (+6−9=13), 5–6th place out of 8
- 1968 Candidates match series: 3½–5½ (+1−3=5), quarterfinals vs Mikhail Tal

== National team results ==
=== Chess Olympiad ===
Between 1950 and 1982 Gligorić participated in 15 Chess Olympiads from which he brought 12 team medals with a personal score of 88 wins, 26 losses and 109 draws (63.9%). As the leader of the golden generation of Serbian chess, Gligorić is the player with the most team medals in Olympiad history (two more than Tigran Petrosian and Borislav Ivkov). His 13 total (team and board) medals make him the second-most decorated Serbian and Yugoslav player of all time (tied with Aleksandar Matanović) behind Borislav Ivkov (14) and one of the 10 most decorated chess players in general, not far behind Kasparov (14), Tal (15), Keres (15), Petrosian (16) and an all time record holder Vasily Smyslov (17).

On top of that, his individual board 1 gold medal from 1958 puts him in the elite company of players (Kashdan, Rubinstein, Botvinnik, Petrosian, Spassky, Karpov, Korchnoi, Kasparov, Ivanchuk, Aronian, Ding, Gukesh and Abdusattorov) who have won both team and individual board 1 gold at Chess Olympiad.

- Dubrovnik 1950: board 1, 11/15 (+9−2=4), board 4th, team gold
- Helsinki 1952: board 1, 9½/15 (+6−2=7), team bronze
- Amsterdam 1954: board 2, 8/14 (+4−2=8), team bronze
- Moscow 1956: board 1, 9½/16 (+6−3=7), team silver
- Munich 1958: board 1, 12/15 (+9−0=6), board gold, team silver
- Leipzig 1960: board 1, 12/17 (+7−0=10), board 4th, team bronze
- Varna 1962: board 1, 12/17 (+8−1=8), board 4th, team silver
- Tel Aviv 1964: board 1, 9½/16 (+4−1=11), team silver
- Havana 1966: board 1, 8½/15 (+6−4=5), team 4th
- Lugano 1968: board 1, 9½/15 (+5−1=9), team silver
- Siegen 1970: board 1, 7½/13 (+3−1=9), team bronze
- Skopje 1972: board 1, 9½/15 (+8−4=3), team bronze
- Nice 1974: board 1, 10/17 (+5−2=10), team silver
- Buenos Aires 1978: board 1, 6/10 (+2−0=8), team 15th
- Lucerne 1982: board 2, 8/13 (+6−3=4), team 4th

=== European Team Chess Championship ===
In eight European team championships, Gligorić won 6 team and 5 individual medals with a personal score of +16−4=41. This makes him the player with the third most team medals (tied with Geller, Tal, Polugaevsky and Svidler, behind Portisch's seven and Petrosian's eight) and the fourth most individual medals in competition's history (tied with Smyslov, behind Geller's/Portisch's six and Petrosian's seven). His 11 total medals are fourth-most in history as well behind Geller (12), Portisch (13) and Petrosian (15).

- Vienna 1957: board 1, 3/6 (+0−0=6), team silver
- Oberhausen 1961: board 1, 4/10 (+0−2=8), team silver
- Hamburg 1965: board 2, 7/10 (+5−1=4), board gold, team silver
- Kapfenberg 1970: board 1, 4/7 (+1−0=6), board bronze, team 4th
- Bath 1973: board 1, 5/7 (+3−0=4), board gold, team silver
- Moscow 1977: board 2, 3½/7 (+1−1=5), board 4th, team bronze
- Skara 1980: board 2, 5½/7 (+4−0=3), board gold; team 4th
- Plovdiv 1983: board 2, 4½/7 (+2−0=5), board gold, team silver

== Lifetime scores against selected grandmasters ==
In his career, Gligorić defeated six reigning, former and future world champions, and his overall record against players of this caliber is 24 wins (+), 50 losses (−) and 109 draws (=). His win against Fischer in the 1962 Olympiad and two wins against Petrosian (in 1963 and 1967) while Petrosian was the World Champion stand out the most. One of those two wins was Petrosian's first defeat since he won the title against Mikhail Botvinnik in 1963.

Gligorić had the following record against the world champions he played:

- Max Euwe (Netherlands) +2−0=5
- Mikhail Botvinnik (Soviet Union) +2−2=6
- Vasily Smyslov (Soviet Union) +6−8=29
- Mikhail Tal (Soviet Union) +2−10=22
- Tigran Petrosian (Soviet Union) +8−11=19
- Boris Spassky (Soviet Union) +0−6=16
- Bobby Fischer (United States) +4−6=6
- Anatoly Karpov (Soviet Union) +0−4=6
- Garry Kasparov (Soviet Union) +0−3=0
- Viswanathan Anand (India) +0−0=1

Selected lifetime results against other top grandmasters:

- Aleksandar Matanović (Yugoslavia) +8−3=25
- Lajos Portisch (Hungary) +8−12=29
- Efim Geller (Soviet Union) +1−4=22
- Ljubomir Ljubojević (Yugoslavia) +7−6=16
- Paul Keres (Soviet Union) +2−8=15
- Victor Korchnoi (Soviet Union) +2−8=14
- Bent Larsen (Denmark) +12−20=13
- Gideon Stahlberg (Sweden) +5−3=15
- Ulf Andersson (Sweden) +6−1=10
- Leonid Stein (Soviet Union) +1−7=1
- Gedeon Barcza (Hungary) +5−1=4
- Miguel Najdorf (Argentina) +2−3=23
- Erich Eliskases (Argentina) +2−0=5
- Lev Polugaevsky (Soviet Union) +1−8=5
- Istvan Bilek (Hungary) +3−2=4
- Vasja Pirc (Yugoslavia) +6−2=11
- David Bronstein (Soviet Union) +0−4=10
- Samuel Reshevsky (United States) +1−5=24
- Mark Taimanov (Soviet Union) +5−3=12
- Borislav Ivkov (Yugoslavia) +10−2=43
- Pal Benko (United States) +5−2=10
- Wolfgang Unzicker (West Germany) +5−5=21
- Oscar Panno (Argentina) +3−0=5
- Laszlo Szabo (Hungary) +7−9=28
- Friðrik Ólafsson (Iceland) +7−4=15
- Vlastimil Hort (Czechoslovakia) +6−3=19
- Petar Trifunović (Yugoslavia) +2−3=24
- Milan Matulović (Yugoslavia) +9−2=13
- Jan Timman (Netherlands) +3−4=10
- Ludek Pachman (Czechoslovakia) +12−2=16

== Rating and ranking ==
During his prime in the 1950s and 1960s, Gligorić was one of the ten best players in the world. When the Elo rating system was introduced in the early 1970s, Gligorić had a rating of 2600. This placed him in the top 15 best players in the world when he was nearly 50 years old. In 1987, at the age of 64, Gligorić was among the top 100 for the last time in his career. His highest Historical Chessmetrics Rating was 2743, in November 1958, making him the 6th highest rated player at that moment.

== Later years and death ==
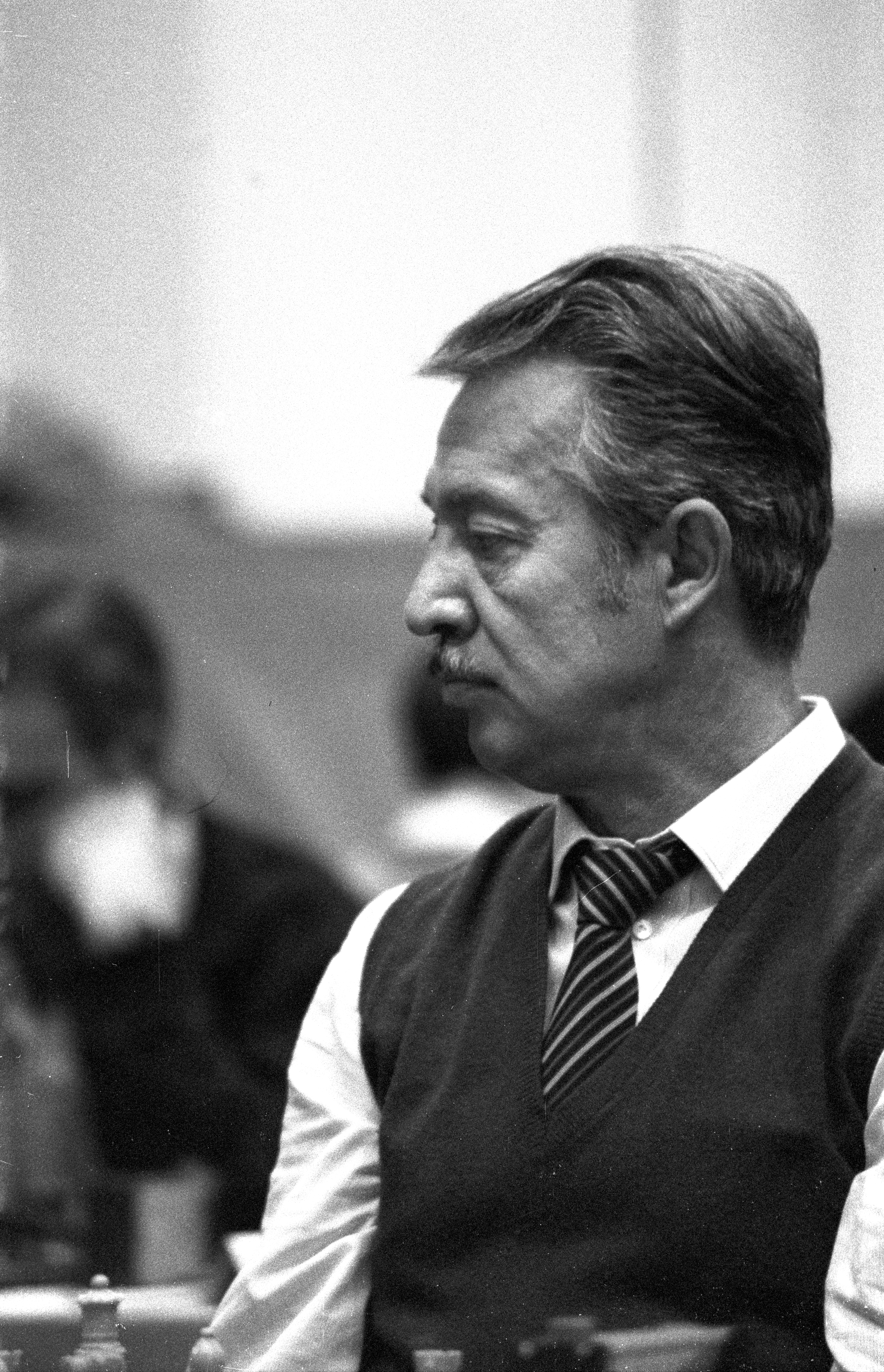
Gligorić at his last Chess Olympiad in 1982

In 1984 to 1985 he was the chief arbiter in the aborted marathon world title match between Anatoly Karpov and Garry Kasparov. Gligorić turned down FIDE's offer to keep the same position in the 1985 rematch. He continued active tournament play well into his sixties. In his last public chess event, he played board 1 for the Yugoslav team in the so-called "USSR vs. Yugoslavia" match in 2007. This match celebrated the USSR versus Yugoslavia matches that were held from the 1950s to the 1970s, in which Gligorić had represented the Yugoslav side 14 times.

During his life Gligorić was very interested in art and culture, but his greatest passion besides chess was music. So in his eighties, Gligorić turned to music, even releasing an album in Belgrade consisting of 12 compositions, mostly jazz, rap and blues.

On 14 August 2012, Gligorić died from a stroke at 89 years of age in Belgrade. He was buried on 16 August 2012, at 13:30 in the Alley of Distinguished Citizens at Belgrade's New Cemetery.

== Legacy ==
Although he had a strong tournament record, Gligorić is also known for his work as an openings theorist and commentator. He contributed to the theory and practice of openings such as the King's Indian Defence, Ruy Lopez and Nimzo-Indian Defence. He achieved notable results using these openings, including wins with both White and Black pieces, particularly with the King's Indian.

Theoretically significant variations in the King's Indian and Ruy Lopez are named after him, including some critical and very commonly played opening variations like the Gligorić Variation of King's Indian (E92); the Ruy Lopez Exchange, Gligorić Variation (C69); the Nimzo-Indian Gligorić System (E54) and the Ruy Lopez Closed Breyer, Gligorić Variation (C95). His battles with Bobby Fischer in the King's Indian and Sicilian Defence (particularly the Najdorf Variation, a long-time Fischer specialty) often worked out in his favour.

Gligorić also invented the famous Mar del Plata Variation of the King's Indian Defence which he employed for the first time at the international tournament in Mar del Plata in 1953 against Najdorf and two rounds later against Eliskases, winning both games.

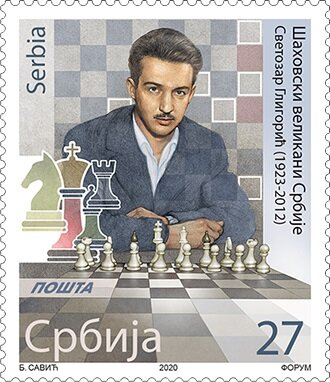
Gligorić on a 2020 stamp of Serbia

As a commentator, Gligorić was able to take advantage of his fluency in a number of languages and his training as a journalist, to produce lucid, interesting game annotations. He was a regular columnist for Chess Review and Chess Life magazines for many years, his "Game of the Month" column often amounting to a complete tutorial in the opening used in the feature game as well as a set of comprehensive game annotations. He wrote a number of chess books in several languages. One of the most notable was Fischer vs. Spassky: The Chess Match of the Century, a detailed account of their epic struggle for the world title in Reykjavík in 1972. He also contributed regularly to the Chess Informant semi-annual (more recently, thrice-yearly) compilation of the world's most important chess games.

In 2019, FIDE established a fair play award named after Gligorić. The "Fair Play Svetozar Gligoric Trophy" is awarded annually by a three-member commission in recognition of sportsmanship, integrity and the promotion of ethical behavior within chess.

On September 23, 2020, the public company "Pošta Srbije" released a series of new postage stamps called: "Chess Giants of Serbia". In addition to Gligorić, Petar Trifunović, Boris Kostić, Milan Matulović and Milunka Lazarević were also given this honour. On that occasion, short biographies of the players depicted on these stamps were also published. The texts are given in Serbian and English, and their authors are: Gligorić's teammate from the national team and close friend, grandmaster Aleksandar Matanović and sports journalist Miroslav Nešić.

== Bibliography ==
- Selected Chess Masterpieces, Pitman, 1970. ISBN 978-0-273-40414-9
- To all the FIDE Members and Central Committee, Belgrade 1978
- Šahovski vodič. T. 1, Suština šaha, Belgrade 1988, ISBN 86-80001-02-3
- Igram protiv figura, Belgrade 1989, ISBN 86-80001-04-X
- Peti meč Kasparov–Karpov za titulu svetskog prvaka, Belgrade 1991, ISBN 86-80001-07-4
- Gligina varijanta, Belgrade 2000
- Fischer vs. Spassky – The Chess Match of the Century, Simon and Schuster, 1972, ISBN 978-0-671-21397-8
- I Play Against Pieces, Batsford, 288 pages, 2002.
- The Chess of Gligoric by David N. L. Levy, World Publishing, 192 pages, 1972.
- The French Defence, co-author with Wolfgang Uhlmann
- How To Open a Chess Game, one of the contributors, along with Larry Evans, Vlastimil Hort, Lajos Portisch, Tigran Petrosian, Bent Larsen and Paul Keres
- Svetozar Gligorić's Chess Career 1945–1970, co-author with Vladimir Sokolov
- Kandidatenturnier fur Schachweltmeisterschaft / Bled – Zagreb – Beograd / 6 September–31 Oktober 1959 (Candidates Tournament for the World Chess Championship / Bled – Zagreb – Beograd / 6 September–31 October 1959), co-author with Viacheslav Ragozin
- Interzonen Turnier Portoroz 1958, co-author with Aleksandar Matanovic
- King's Indian Defence, Mar Del Plata Variation
- Play the Nimzo-Indian Defence
- The Sicilian Defence co-author with Vladimir Sokolov
- Le Grande Tournoi International D'echecs, Terre des Hommes, Montreal 1979
- The World Chess Championship, co-author with Robert Wade
- Shall We Play Fischerandom Chess?
- Yugoslav Chess Triumphs, co-author with Petar Trifunovic, Rudolf Maric and Dragoljub Janosevic
- The Najdorf Variation of the Sicilian Defence, co-author with Boris Spassky, Efim Geller and Lubosh Kavalek

== Quotes ==
"The moment of death has the power to stress in a single move the achievement or the futility of a life."

== Notable games ==
Petrosian vs. Gligorić, 1970

Position: g1 white king, f1 white rook, d1 white queen, c1 white bishop, a1 white rook, h2 white pawn, f2 white pawn, d2 white knight, g3 white pawn, f3 white bishop, c3 white knight, f4 black knight, c4 white pawn, b4 white pawn, a4 white pawn, g5 black pawn, f5 black knight, e5 black pawn, d5 white pawn, d6 black pawn, h7 black pawn, g7 black bishop, c7 black pawn, b7 black pawn, a7 black pawn, g8 black king, f8 black rook, d8 black queen, c8 black bishop, a8 black rook

Position after 14.g3

One of Gligorić's most famous games was this win against the former world champion Tigran Petrosian at the great "Tournament of Peace" held in Zagreb in 1970. It displays Gligorić's virtuosity on the Black side of the King's Indian and his willingness to play for a sacrificial attack against one of history's greatest defenders. Zagreb 1970 was another Gligorić tournament success, as he tied for second (ahead of Petrosian and behind Fischer) at the start of the latter's 1970–71 run of tournament and match victories.

Petrosian vs. Gligorić, Zagreb 1970; King's Indian Defence, Classical Variation (ECO E97)
1.c4 g6 2.Nf3 Bg7 3.d4 Nf6 4.Nc3 0-0 5.e4 d6 6.Be2 e5 7.0-0 Nc6 8.d5 Ne7 9.b4 Nh5 10.Nd2 Nf4 11.a4 f5 12.Bf3 g5 13.exf5 Nxf5 14.g3 (diagram) Nd4 15.gxf4 Nxf3+ 16.Qxf3 g4 17.Qh1 exf4 18.Bb2 Bf5 19.Rfe1 f3 20.Nde4 Qh4 21.h3 Be5 22.Re3 gxh3 23.Qxf3 Bg4 24.Qh1 h2+ 25.Kg2 Qh5 26.Nd2 Bd4 27.Qe1 Rae8 28.Nce4 Bxb2 29.Rg3 Be5 30.R1a3 Kh8 31.Kh1 Rg8 32.Qf1 Bxg3 33.Rxg3 Rxe4 0–1

Gligorić was the first to inflict a defeat on Petrosian (at the First Piatigorsky Cup in 1963) after he won the world title from Mikhail Botvinnik in 1963.

Awards
Preceded by Franjo Mihalić	(Socialist Federal Republic of Yugoslavia) The Best Athlete of Yugoslavia; 1958	Succeeded by Stanko Lorger
