= Nikola Karaklajić =

Serbian chess master

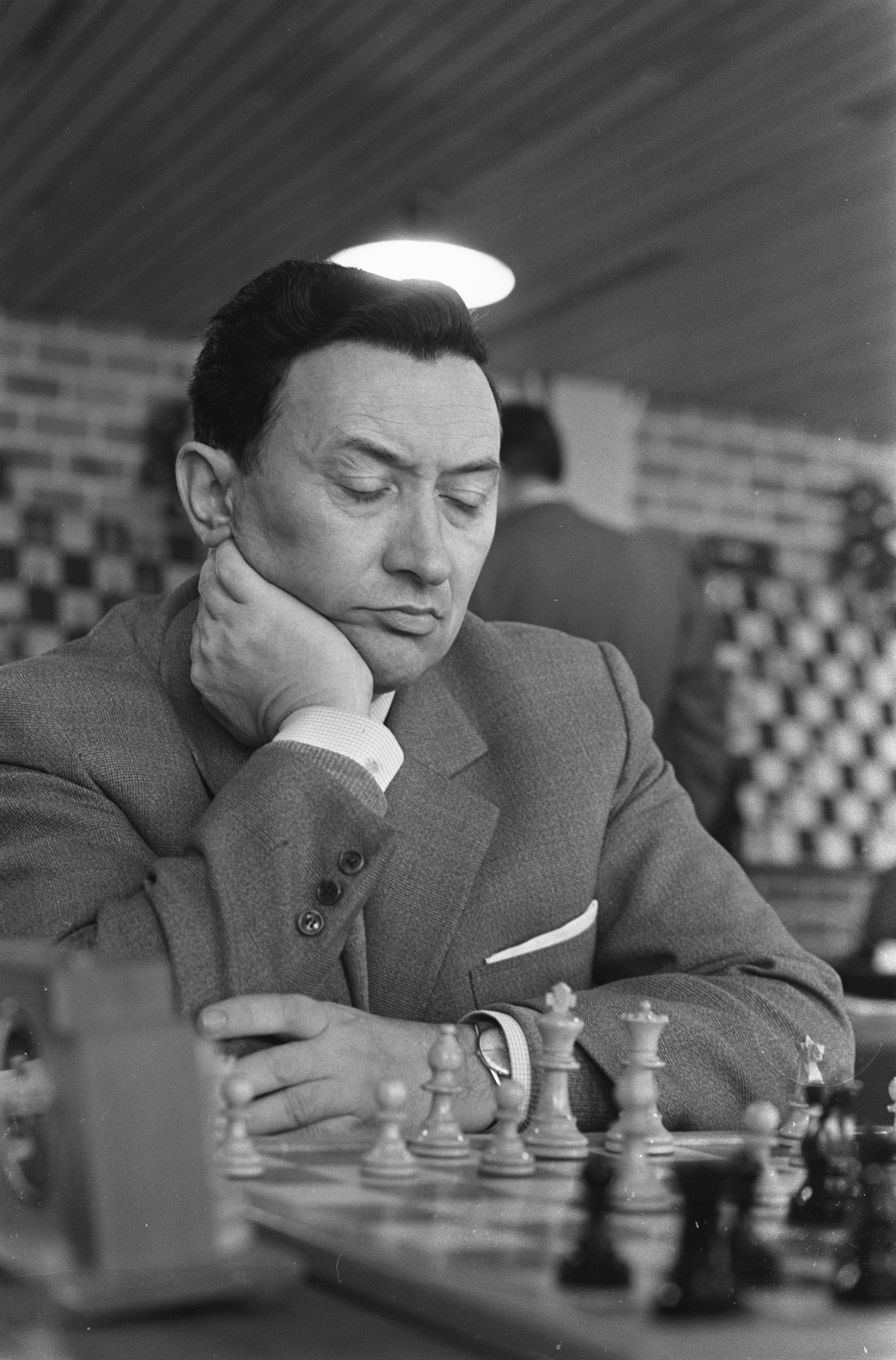
Karaklajić at a chess tournament at The Hague during January 1968.

Nikola Karaklajić (Cyrillic: Никола Караклајић, Belgrade, 24 February 1926 – 16 December 2008) was a Serbian-Yugoslav chess master.

== Biography ==
He was the first notable exponent and probably inventor of the Belgrade Gambit. He won the Yugoslav Chess Championship in 1955, competed in the 12th Chess Olympiad, Belgian Chess Championship, European Team Chess Championship and played notable games with Hans Berliner, Borislav Ivkov and others as part of the peer group of strong Yugoslav players contemporary with Borislav Milić.

Aside from chess, Karaklajić was also known as a radio personality on Radio Belgrade (1957–1982) and for his interest in rock music featuring in the documentary Rockovnik. He was first editor in chief of Džuboks (i.e. Jukebox) magazine and once arranged visas for Zlatni Dečaci by representing the band members as young chess players. He organized the first concert of YU grupa and featured in YU 100: najbolji albumi jugoslovenske rok i pop muzike. His radio show Nedeljom u devet i pet (Sunday at 9:05), which he produced and hosted, introduced bands such as Samonikli.
