= Juraj Nikolac =

Croatian chess player

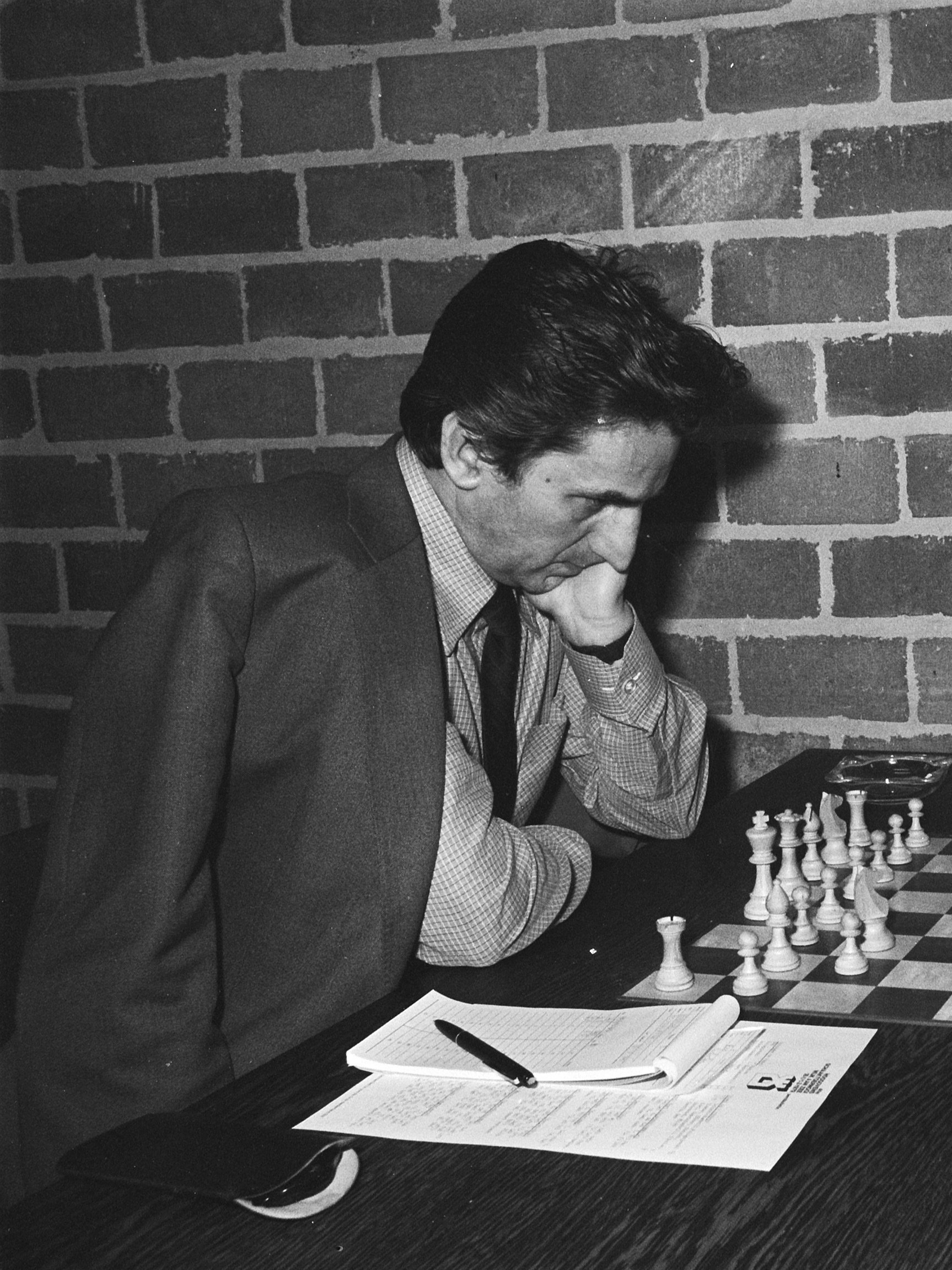
- Juraj Nikolac, Wijk aan Zee 1979

Personal information
- Born: 22 April 1932 (age 94) Metković, Yugoslavia

Chess career
- Country: Yugoslavia; Croatia
- Title: Grandmaster (1979)
- FIDE rating: 2434 (November 2026)
- Peak rating: 2500 (January 1988)
- Peak ranking: No. 105 (January 1978)

Juraj Nikolac (born 22 April 1932) is a Croatian, formerly Yugoslav, chess player who received the FIDE title of Grandmaster (GM) in 1979. He previously held the International Master (IM) title since 1975. Nikolac was born in Metković and is a retired physics teacher.

He finished 3 behind Aleksandar Matanović in the 1978 Yugoslav championship. His international tournament successes include:

- 4th, Zagreb, 1973
- 2=, Zagreb - Rovinj, 1975
- 2=, Wijk aan Zee B, 1976
- 1=, Amsterdam B, 1977
- 1st, Vrnjacka Banja, 1978
- 2nd, Dortmund, 1979
- 2nd, Oberwart, 1985
- 1st, Bled, 1986
- 1=, Linz, 1986
- 1st, Maribor, 1987

He is the author of a number of theoretical studies. With the death of Aleksandar Matanović in August 2023, Nikolac became the oldest living grandmaster in the world, until February 2024 when Andreas Dückstein and Iivo Nei were given honorary grandmaster titles.. However after the death of Livo Nei on 6th July 2026, he became the oldest living Grandmaster again.
