= Dragoljub Janošević =

Serbian chess grandmaster

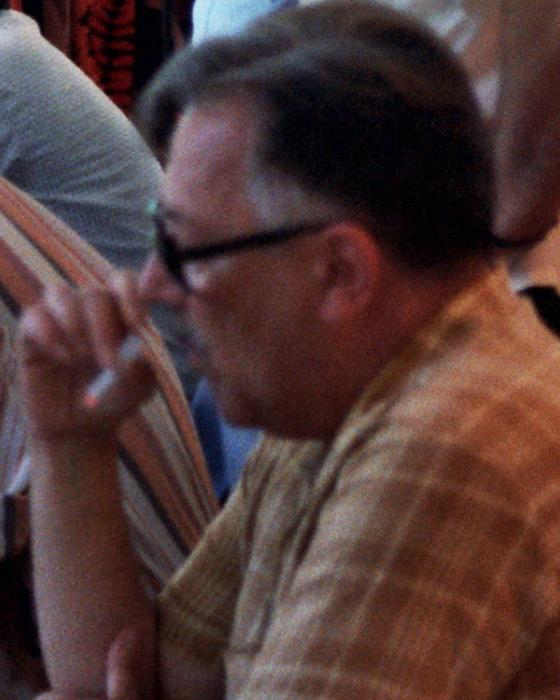

Personal information
- Born: Dragoljub Janošević; 8 July 1923 Belgrade, Yugoslavia
- Died: 20 May 1993 (aged 69)

Chess career
- Country: Yugoslavia
- Title: Grandmaster
- Peak rating: 2518 (March 1954)

Dragoljub Janošević (Janosevic) (8 July 1923 – 20 May 1993) was a Serbian-Yugoslav chess Grandmaster.

== Background ==
Janošević became an International Master in 1964 and earned the Grandmaster title the following year.

In the 1950s and 1960s he played several times in the final of the Yugoslav Championship. He loved to play blindfold chess games.

== Notable results ==
- Belgrade 1958 drawn match against a 15-year-old Bobby Fischer (+0 –0 =2).
- Belgrade 1962 3rd= 6.5/11 (Svetozar Gligorić won with 8.5/11).
- Sarajevo 1966 7th= 8/15 (Mikhail Tal and Dragoljub Čirić won with 11/15).
- Harrachov 1966 2nd, behind Semen Furman.
- Venice 1967 4th= (Jan Hein Donner won).
- Solingen 1968 3rd= (Levente Lengyel won).
- Vršac 1969 1st.
- Amsterdam 1970 7th= (Lev Polugaevsky and Boris Spassky won).
- Bari 1970 1st.
- Netanya 1971 14th= (Lubomir Kavalek and Bruno Parma won).
- Kikinda 1973 1st.
- Madonna di Campiglio 1974 2nd= (Gyula Sax won)

== Notable games ==
Janošević scored individual victories over the world champions Mikhail Botvinnik, Mikhail Tal, Tigran Petrosian and Fischer and beat as well such strong grandmasters as David Bronstein, Bent Larsen or Samuel Reshevsky.

- Janošević – Petrosian Belgrade 1954
- Tal – Janošević Sarajevo 1966
- Janošević – Fischer Skopje 1967
- Janošević – Botvinnik Belgrade 1969
