= Rudolf Marić =

Yugoslav chess player (1927–1990)

- Born: 13 May 1927; Novi Sad
- Died: 26 August 1990 (aged 63); Belgrade
- Title: Grandmaster

Rudolf Marić (13 May 1927, Novi Sad – 26 August 1990, Belgrade) was a Yugoslav chess master and author.

== Biography ==
Marić was born in Novi Sad in 1921. He was awarded the International Master (IM) title in 1964. In 1956, he represented Yugoslavia at the World Student Team Chess Championship, won the team bronze medal and the individual gold medal for his board. In 1978, he won 3rd Chess Mitropa Cup with the Yugoslav team. He died on 26 August 1990 in Belgrade. FIDE awarded him Honorary Grandmaster (GM) in 1990 shortly after his death, making him one of the only three people to receive the GM title posthumously (the others being Karoly Honfi and Sultan Khan). Marić wrote several chess books.

== Publications ==
- Šahovske minijature, 1973
- Yugoslav Chess Triumphs, 1976
