= Božidar Đurašević =

Serbian chess player (1933–2022)

Božidar Đurašević (Serbian Cyrillic: Божидар Ђурашевић; 26 April 1933 in Belgrade – 23 January 2022 in Belgrade) was a Serbian chess player. Đurašević became International Master in 1957 and represented Yugoslavia at the Chess Olympiad 1956 and 1958.
