= Dragoljub Čirić =

Serbian-Yugoslavian chess grandmaster (1935–2014)

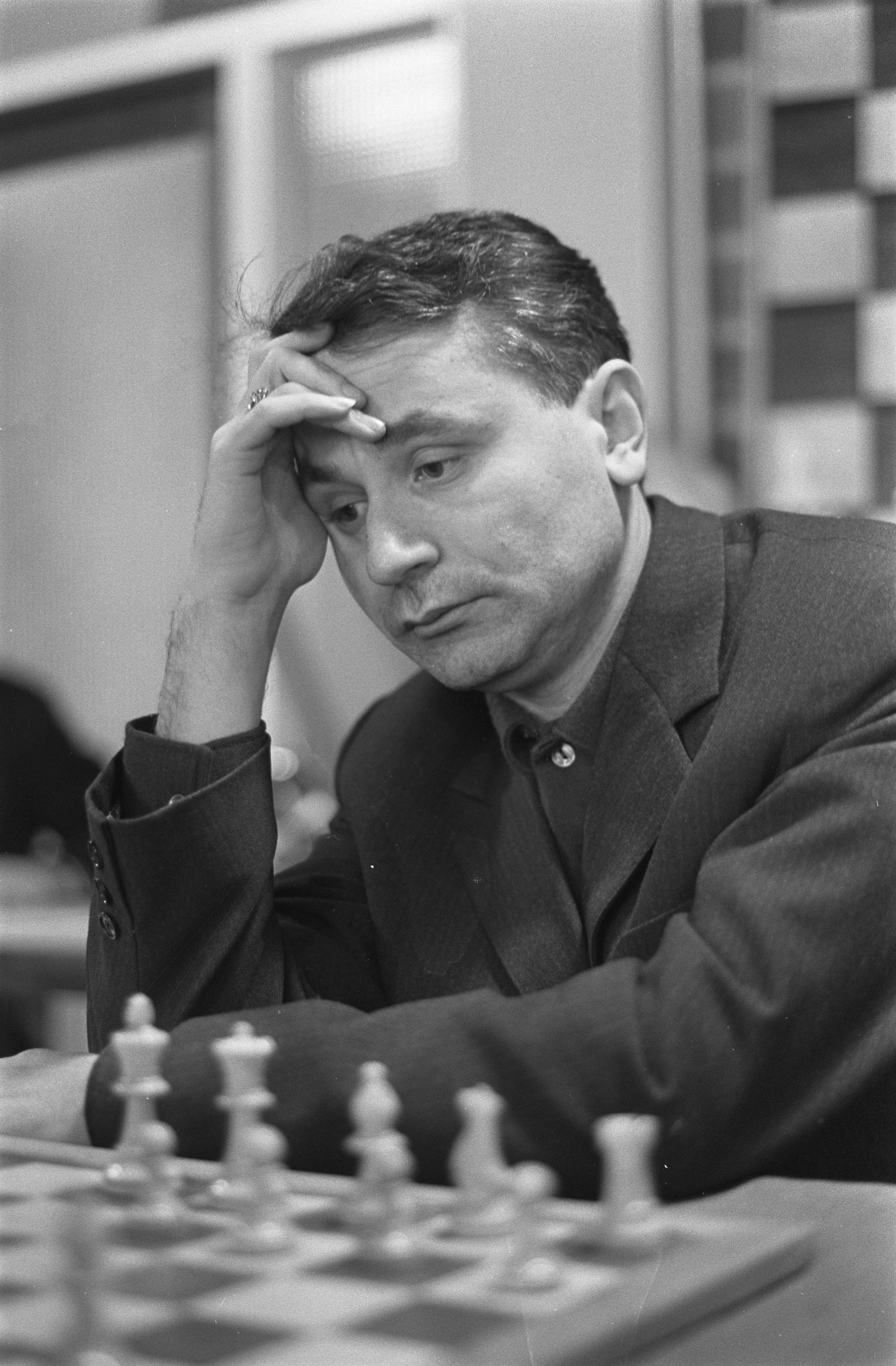
- Čirić at the Hoogovens tournament, 1968

Personal information
- Born: Dragoljub Miladin Čirić; 12 November 1935 Novi Sad, Yugoslavia (now Serbia)
- Died: 17 August 2014 (aged 78)

Chess career
- Country: Yugoslavia
- Title: Grandmaster (1965)
- Peak rating: 2490 (July 1971)
- Peak ranking: No. 83 (July 1971)

Dragoljub Miladin Čirić (Serbian Cyrillic: Драгољуб Ћирић; 12 November 1935 – 17 August 2014) was a Serbian-Yugoslavian chess grandmaster.

== Background ==
Čirić was born in Novi Sad in 1935. He gained the International Master title in 1961 and became a Grandmaster in 1965.

== Notable team results ==
Čirić played for Yugoslavia in the Olympiads of 1966 and 1968. His results were:

- 17th Chess Olympiad 1966 Havana – Čirić scored a perfect 8/8 playing as second reserve, and Yugoslavia finished 4th.
- 18th Chess Olympiad 1968 Lugano – Čirić scored 5/7 and Yugoslavia finished 2nd, receiving silver medals.

Čirić also played in the European Team Chess Championship twice, in 1961 and 1965. His results were as follows:

- 2nd European Team Championship 1961 Oberhausen – Čirić scored 6½/9 on board 7, receiving an individual gold medal. Yugoslavia finished 2nd (behind USSR) receiving silver medals.
- 3rd European Team Championship 1965 Hamburg – Čirić scored 4/8 on board 9, receiving an individual silver medal. Yugoslavia again finished 2nd behind USSR for team silver.

== Notable individual results ==
- Chigorin Memorial 1965: 3rd (the winners were Wolfgang Unzicker and Boris Spassky)
- Sarajevo 1966: 1st= 11/15 (with Mikhail Tal)
- Hoogovens Beverwijk 1967: 3rd (the winner was Spassky)
- Sarajevo 1968: 1st= 10/15 (with Anatoly Lein)

== Death ==
His death at the age of 78 was announced by the Belgrade Chess Federation on 17 August 2014.
