= Nenad Ferčec =

Croatian chess grandmaster (born 1961)

- Nenad Ferčec in 2011

Personal information
- Born: April 12, 1961 (age 65) Pula, SR Croatia, SFR Yugoslavia

Chess career
- Country: Yugoslavia (until 1991); Croatia (since 1991)
- Title: Grandmaster (2007)
- Peak rating: 2512 (October 2005)

Nenad Ferčec (born 12 April 1961) is a Croatian chess Grandmaster who won the Croatian Chess Championship in 1984.

== Career ==
Ferčec won the Croatian Chess Championship in 1984. In 1999, he shared first place at the national championship, but finished behind Ivan Žaja on tiebreaks. He was also runner-up at the 2004 Croatian Championship.

He represented Croatia at the 35th Chess Olympiad in Bled in 2002. He also competed in the European Individual Chess Championship in 2010, as well as the European Club Cup in 2006 and 2008.

FIDE awarded him the International Master (IM) title in 1995 and the Grandmaster (GM) title in 2007.

=== Tournament results ===
Ferčec has won or tied for first place in several open and international tournaments:

- 1997: Tied for 1st place in Zadar with Bogdan Lalić, Mladen Palac, and Mišo Cebalo.
- 2000: Shared 1st place at the Bled Open.
- 2001: Tied for 1st place at the Donau Open in Aschach an der Donau.
- 2002: 1st place at the Velika Gorica Open.
- 2003: 1st place in Opatija and tied for 1st place in Rabac with Robert Zelčić and Robert Lončar.
- 2004: Tied for 1st place at the Bošnjaci Open.
- 2005: Tied for 1st place at the Ljubljana Open.
- 2009: 1st place at the Poreč Open.

He reached his peak FIDE rating of 2512 in October 2005.
