= Goran Dizdar =

Croatian chess grandmaster (born 1958)

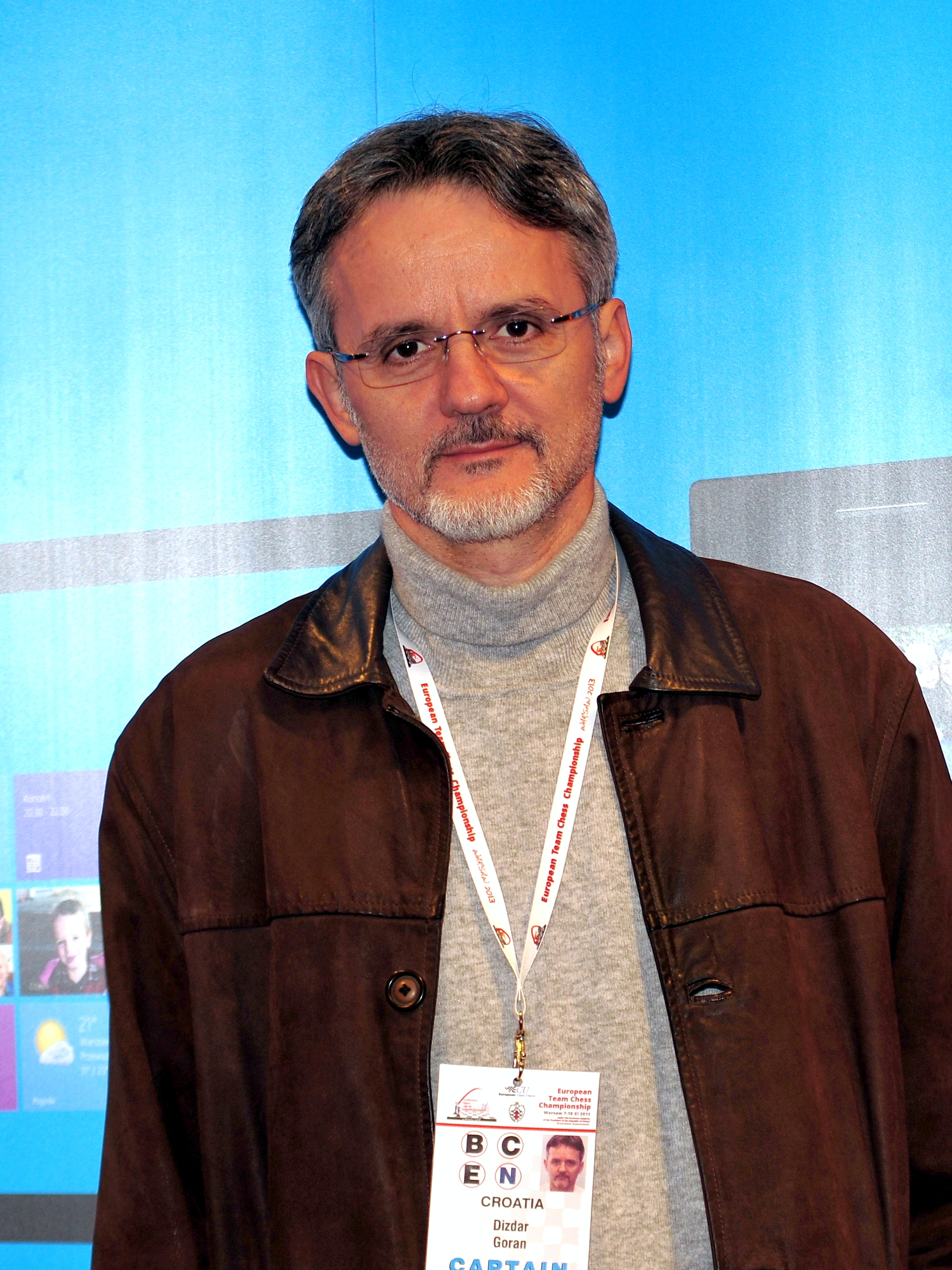
- Goran Dizdar in Warsaw, 2013

Personal information
- Born: December 4, 1958 (age 67) Zagreb, SR Croatia, SFR Yugoslavia

Chess career
- Country: Yugoslavia (until 1991); Croatia (since 1991)
- Title: Grandmaster (1991)
- FIDE rating: 2483 (November 2026)
- Peak rating: 2570 (July 1998)

Goran Dizdar (born 4 December 1958) is a Croatian chess Grandmaster and trainer who previously represented Yugoslavia.

== Career ==
Dizdar was awarded the Grandmaster (GM) title by FIDE in 1991.

In 1995, he won the Croatian Chess Championship after defeating Zdenko Kožul in a playoff. He also finished as national runner-up in 1998.

At the 1998 Zonal tournament in Dresden, Dizdar tied for third place behind Ivan Sokolov and Robert Zelčić, qualifying for the FIDE World Chess Championship 1999 in Las Vegas. At the championship, he defeated Liang Chong in the first round before being eliminated by Sergei Movsesian in the second round.

=== Team chess ===
Dizdar represented Croatia at five Chess Olympiads between 1992 and 2006. At the World Team Chess Championship in 1997, he won an individual silver medal on board five. He also competed in three European Team Chess Championships (1992, 1997, 2005), winning an individual bronze medal on board five in 1992.

=== Tournament results ===
- 1983: 1st place at the Oberwart Open and 2nd place in Tuzla behind Daniel Cámpora.
- 1985: Tied for 1st place with Wolfgang Uhlmann at the Tatran Cup in Starý Smokovec.
- 1988: Tied for 1st place at the Liechtenstein Open.
- 1996: Tied for 1st place with Christian Gabriel in Makarska.
- 2006: Tied for 1st place at Cap d'Agde alongside Anthony Kosten and Mladen Palac.

He reached his peak FIDE rating of 2570 in July 1998, when he was ranked tied for second among Croatian players.
