= Hrvoje Stević =

Croatian chess grandmaster (born 1980)

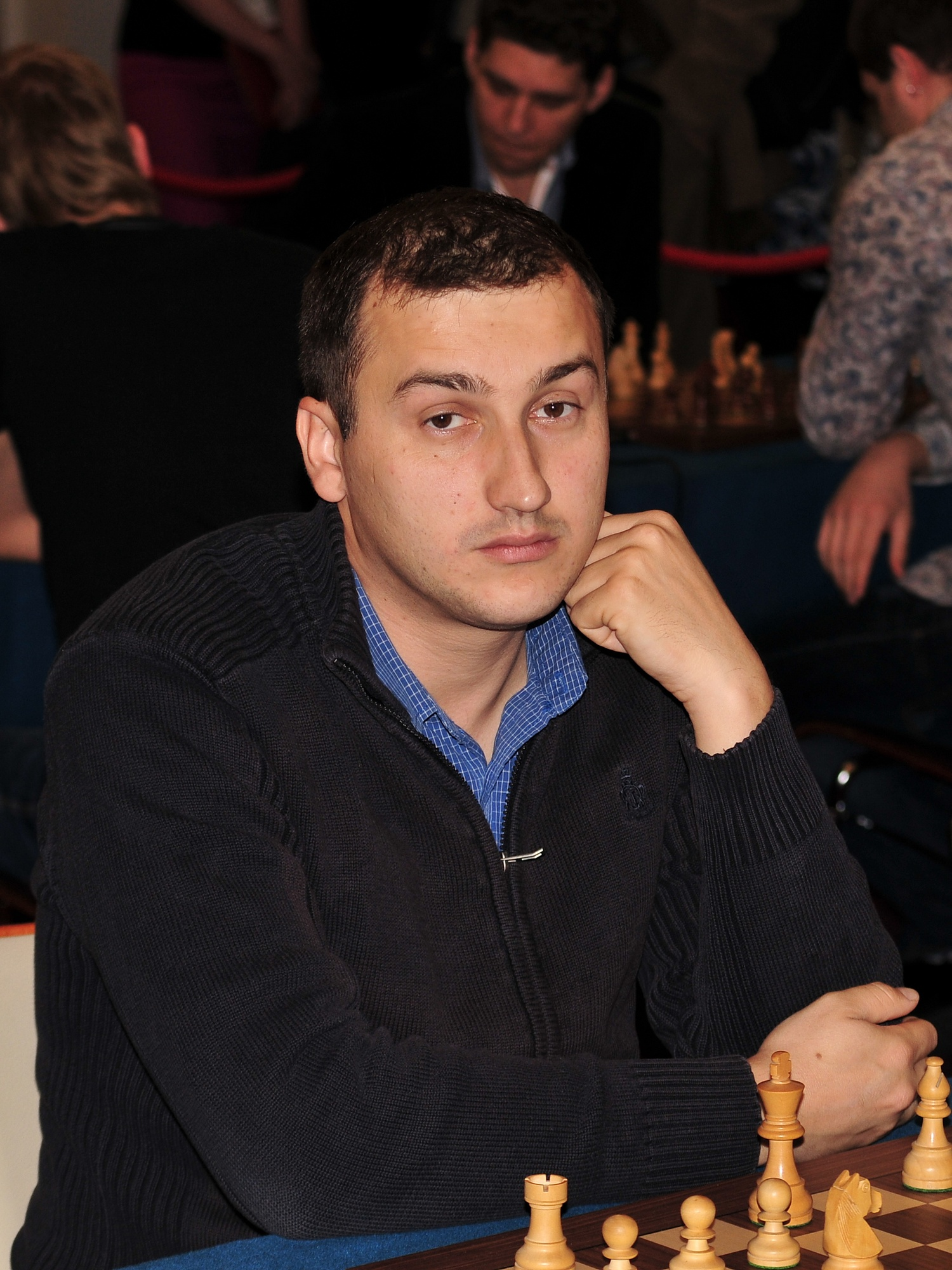

Personal information
- Born: January 8, 1980 (age 46) Osijek, Yugoslavia

Chess career
- Country: Croatia
- Title: Grandmaster (2002)
- FIDE rating: 2513 (July 2026)
- Peak rating: 2637 (May 2013)

Hrvoje Stević is a Croatian chess grandmaster.

== Chess career ==
In 1995, he won the U16 section of the World Youth Chess Championship.

In January 2008, he won the Croatian Chess Championship a full point ahead of runner-up Robert Zelčić.

In July 2020, he finished as runner up in the Croatian Chess Championship, alongside Zdenko Kožul, Robert Zelčić and Ante Brkić.
