= Leon Livaić =

Croatian chess grandmaster (born 2000)

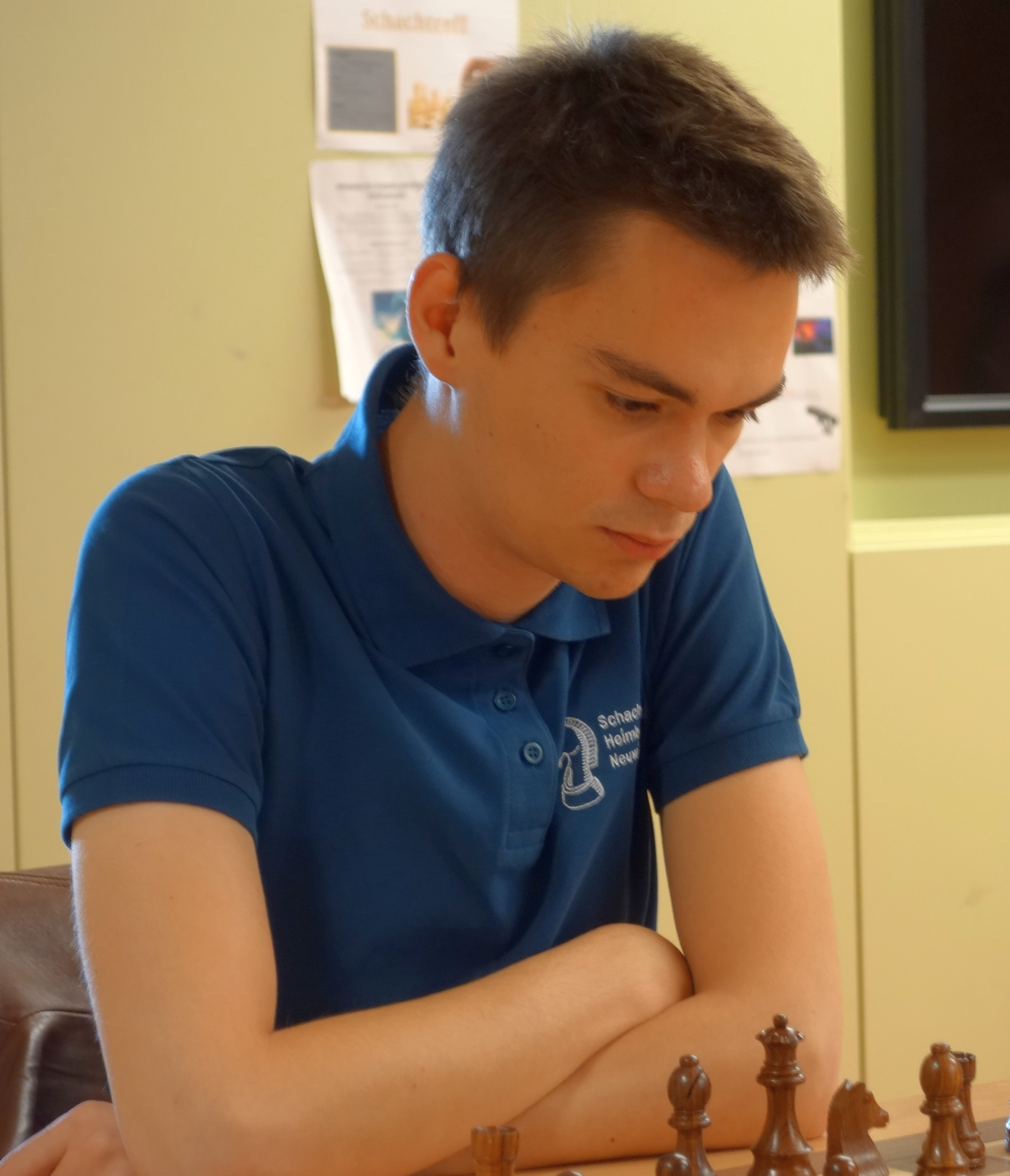

Personal information
- Born: October 16, 2000 (age 25) Zagreb, Croatia

Chess career
- Country: Croatia
- Title: Grandmaster (2022)
- FIDE rating: 2567 (July 2026)
- Peak rating: 2591 (April 2023)

Leon Livaić is a Croatian chess grandmaster.

== Chess career ==
In March 2021, he played in the World University Online Rapid Championship, where he finished in fourth place and was the highest-finishing IM.

In December 2021, he finished third in the Croatian Chess Championship, only behind grandmasters Zdenko Kožul and Ivan Šarić.

In April 2023, he tied for second place with Mustafa Yılmaz, Abhijeet Gupta, Maxime Lagarde, Gabor Papp, Matthieu Cornette, and Tamás Bánusz in the Reykjavik Open.

In December 2023, he won the Croatian Chess Championship, finishing a half-point ahead of Marin Bosiočić.

In January 2024, he tied for fourth place with Lê Tuấn Minh, Denis Lazavik, Maxime Vachier-Lagrave, Arjun Erigaisi, and Renato Terry in a Titled Tuesday tournament.
