= Croatian Chess Championship =

The Croatian Chess Championship is the annual individual national chess championship of Croatia.

== Winners ==
| Year | Venue | Champion |
|---|---|---|
| 1992 | Split | Mirko Jukić |
| 1992 | Đakovo | Ognjen Cvitan |
| 1993 | Zagreb | Davor Rogić |
| 1994 | Poreč | Filip Ljubičić |
| 1995 | Pula | Goran Dizdar |
| 1996 | Pula | Robert Zelčić |
| 1998 | Pula | Robert Zelčić |
| 1999 | Pula | Ivan Žaja |
| 2000 | Pula; Zagreb (playoff) | Ivan Žaja |
| 2001 | Pula | Mladen Palac |
| 2002 | Zagreb | Ivica Armanda |
| 2003 | Rabac | Robert Zelčić |
| 2004 | Zagreb | Mladen Palac |
| 2005 | Vukovar | Krunoslav Hulak |
| 2006 | Kutina | Zdenko Kožul |
| 2007 | Split | Hrvoje Stević |
| 2008 | Rijeka; Zagreb (playoff) | Mladen Palac |
| 2009 | Otočac; Zagreb (playoff) | Ivan Šarić |
| 2010 | Marija Bistrica | Ante Brkić |
| 2011 | Opatija | Mladen Palac |
| 2012 | Plitvička Jezera | Hrvoje Stević |
| 2013 | Poreč | Ivan Šarić |
| 2014 | Opatija | Alojzije Janković |
| 2015/16 | Poreč | Zdenko Kožul |
| 2017 | Valpovo | Marin Bosiočić |
| 2018 | Požega | Ivan Šarić |
| 2019 | Bjelovar | Marin Bosiočić |
| 2020 | Vinkovci | Saša Martinović |
| 2021 | Rijeka | Zdenko Kožul |
| 2022 | Split | Ivan Šarić |
| 2023 | Zagreb | Leon Livaić |

| Year | Venue | Women's Champion |
|---|---|---|
| 1992 | Pula | Albina Paraminski |
| 1992 | Đakovo | Vlasta Maček |
| 1993 | Zagreb | Mirjana Medić |
| 1994 | Poreč | Mirjana Medić |
| 1995 | Slavonski Brod | Mirjana Medić |
| 1996 | Pula | Mirjana Medić |
| 1998 | Pula | Zorica Puljek Salai |
| 1999 | Pula | Vlasta Maček |
| 2002 | Zagreb | Mara Jelica |
| 2003 | Rabac | Mirjana Medić |
| 2004 | Zagreb | Rajna Šargač |
| 2006 | Zagreb | Mirjana Medić |
| 2007 | Đakovo | Borka Frančišković |
| 2008 | Sveti Martin na Muri | Borka Frančišković |
| 2009 | Krapina | Borka Frančišković |
| 2010 | Topusko | Borka Frančišković |
| 2011 | Topusko | Borka Frančišković |
| 2012 | Rijeka | Mirjana Medić |
| 2013 | Zagreb | Borka Frančišković |
| 2014 | Đakovo | Valentina Golubenko |
| 2015 | Đakovo | Borka Frančišković |
| 2016 | Zagreb | Kristina Šarić |
| 2017 | Malinska | Ana Berke |
| 2018 | Zagreb | Ana Berke |
| 2020 | Đurđevac | Patricija Vujnović |
| 2021 | [[]] | [[]] |
| 2022 | [[]] | [[]] |
| 2023 | [[]] | [[]] |
