= Mišo Cebalo =

Croatian chess grandmaster (1945–2022)

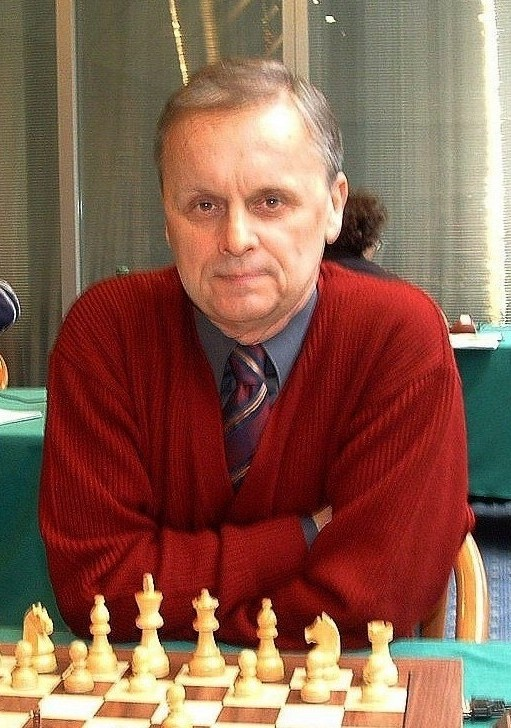

Personal information
- Born: 6 February 1945 Zagreb, Independent State of Croatia
- Died: 2 September 2022 (aged 77) Zagreb, Croatia

Chess career
- Country: Croatia
- Title: Grandmaster (1985)
- Peak rating: 2570 (January 1995)

Mišo Cebalo (6 February 1945 – 2 September 2022) was a Croatian chess Grandmaster. He won the 19th World Senior Chess Championship at Condino 2009. In 2011 he was awarded the title of FIDE Senior Trainer.

== Biography ==
His father, a good chess player himself, taught him to play chess when he was five years old. At 13 he began to frequent a local chess club and when he was 20 he played in the Yugoslav championship at Titograd, earning the Master title. Thereafter he enrolled in a language course at the University of Zagreb, stopping for a few years to play chess. After finishing the studies and having got an employment in the Center of Physical Culture of Zagreb, in 1977 he fully resumed his chess activity, earning the International Master title in 1978.

In 1980 he received the first Grandmaster norm after he won a tournament in Smederevska Palanka. In 1985 he came equal first in the Championship of Yugoslavia, but lost the play-off match with GM Slavoljub Marjanović. In the same year he won a zonal tournament in Kavala (Greece), obtaining the full Grandmaster title. He advanced to the next phase of the World championship, which was played in the Mende-Taxco Interzonal, where he placed 6th-7th out of 16 players (Jan Timman was the winner).

Cebalo played for Croatia in two chess Olympiads: on 1st board at Manila 1992 and on 4th board at Moscow 1994. He often played in the Reggio Emilia chess tournament, winning the "C" section in 1991 (the major section was won by Anatoly Karpov and the "B" section by Ljubomir Ljubojević).

Cebalo won many open tournaments, one of the last being the "Luigi Amalfi" festival of the Isle of Elba in 2007.

Cebalo died in Zagreb in September 2022, at the age of 77. Despite advancing age and ailing health, he continued to participate in chess tournaments almost till the very end.

== Notable games ==
Cebalo – Kožul, 1994

Position: a8 black rook, a7 black pawn, c7 black rook, e7 black pawn, f7 black king, h7 black pawn, a6 white rook, e6 black bishop, g6 black pawn, d5 black knight, e5 white pawn, f5 black pawn, a3 white bishop, c3 black pawn, d3 white rook, g3 white pawn, c2 white queen, d2 black bishop, f2 white pawn, h2 white pawn, g1 white king

Position after 26. ...Bd2

Mišo Cebalo - Zdenko Kožul - Slovenian team championship 1994.

Grünfeld Defence (D-85) - 1. d4 Nf6 2. Nf3 g6 3. c4 Bg7 4. Nc3 d5 5. cxd5 Nxd5 6. e4 Nxc3 7. bxc3 c5 8. Rb1 0-0 9. Be2 cxd4 10. cxd4 Qa5+ 11.Bd2 Qxa2 12. 0-0 Nd7 13. Bb4 Nb6 14. Ra1 Qe6 5. e5 Bh6 17. d5 Nxd5 18. Bc4 b5 19. Nd4 bxc4 20. Nxe6 Bxe6 21. Ra6 Kf7 22. Ba3 Rfb8 23. Qc2 Rc8 24. Rd1 c3 25. g3 Rc7 26. Rd3 Bd2 ( See diagram at right )

27. Rxe6! Kxe6 28. Qb3 Rd7 29. Bd6 exd6 30. Qxd5+ Ke7 31. exd6+ Kf6 32. Qxa8 c2 33. Qxh8+ Kg5 34. Rc3 Bxc3 35. Qxc3 Rxd6 36. Qxc2 Rd7 37. Qc6 Rf7 38. Qe6 Rb7 39. h4+ Kh6 40. Qf6 1-0.

- Predrag Nikolić – Mišo Cebalo, Banja Luka 1981, Symmetrical English A-30
- Dragoljub Velimirović – Mišo Cebalo, Sarajevo 1986, Sicilian Scheveningen B-86
- Nebojša Ilijin – Mišo Cebalo, Baden open 1999, Sicilian Dragon B-71
- Mišo Cebalo – Erald Dervishi, Bratto open 2001, Queen's gambit, Tartakower var. D-58
- Eduard Mnatsakanian – Mišo Cebalo, World Seniors championship 2008, Sicilian Dragon B-78
