= Aleksander Delchev =

Bulgarian chess grandmaster and writer (born 1971)

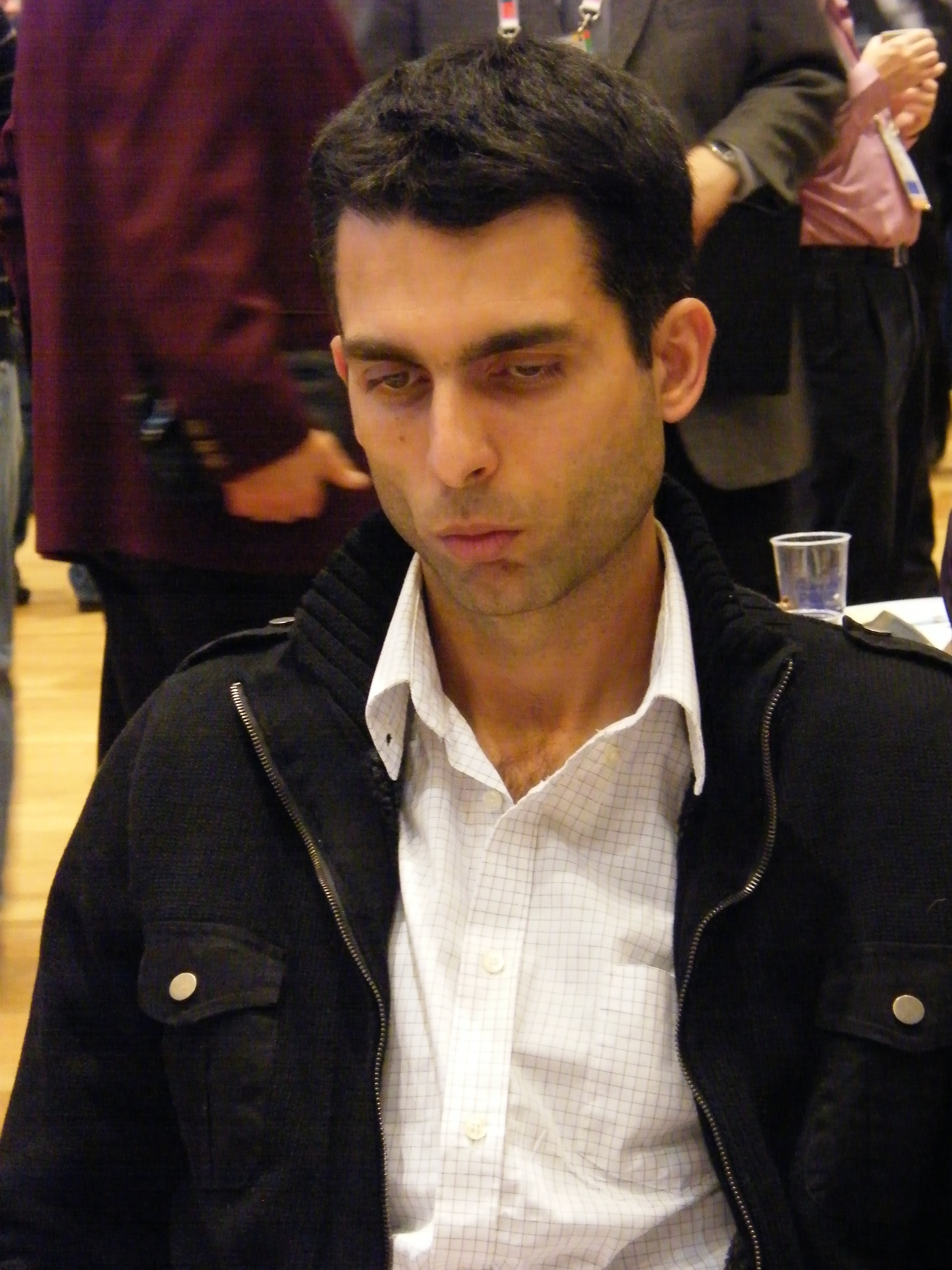
- Aleksander Delchev at Dresden

Personal information
- Born: 15 July 1971 (age 55) Sofia, Bulgaria

Chess career
- Country: Bulgaria (until 2024); Serbia (since 2024)
- Title: Grandmaster (1997)
- FIDE rating: 2441 (November 2026)
- Peak rating: 2669 (October 2005)
- Peak ranking: No. 36 (October 2005)

Aleksander Delchev (Bulgarian: Александър Делчев; born 15 July 1971) is a Bulgarian chess player and writer currently representing Serbia. He was awarded the title of Grandmaster by FIDE in 1997. Delchev won the Bulgarian Chess Championship in 1994, 1996 and 2001. He played for the Bulgarian national team in the Chess Olympiads of 1994, 2000, 2002, 2004, 2006, 2008, 2010 and 2012 with a performance of 64.6% (+36=34-12).

His tournament victories include the European Junior Chess Championship (1991–1992), the 47th Reggio Emilia chess tournament (2004–2005), the 4th Open Master at the Sixth International Chess Festival in Benidorm (2007), the International Open Championship of Croatia (2007) and the Open International Bavarian Chess Championship in Bad Wiessee (2005 and 2013). In 2011 he tied for 2nd-7th with Julio Granda, Ivan Šarić, Pablo Almagro Llamas, Maxim Turov and Mihail Marin at the 31st Villa de Benasque Open.

== Books ==
- Delchev, Alexander; Semkov, Semko (2006). The Safest Sicilian - A Black Repertoire with 1.e4 c5 2.Nf3 e6. Chess Stars. ISBN 978-9548782456.
- Delchev, Alexander; Agrest, Evgenij (2011). The Safest Grünfeld. Chess Stars. ISBN 978-9548782814.
- Delchev, Alexander (2012). The Modern Reti - An Anti-Slav Repertoire. Chess Stars. ISBN 978-9548782876.
- Delchev, Alexander; Semkov, Semko (2014). The Most Flexible Sicilian. Chess Stars. ISBN 978-9548782975.
- Delchev, Alexander; Semkov, Semko (2015). Understanding the Queen's Gambit Accepted. Chess Stars. ISBN 978-6197188059.
- Delchev, Alexander; Semkov, Semko (2016). Attacking the English/Reti. Chess Stars. ISBN 978-6197188097.
- Delchev, Alexander (2018). Bc4 against the Open Games. Chess Stars. ISBN 9786197188172.
- Delchev, Alexander (2019). The Safest Grünfeld Reloaded. Chess Stars. ISBN 9786197188257.
