= Julio Granda =

Peruvian chess grandmaster (born 1967)

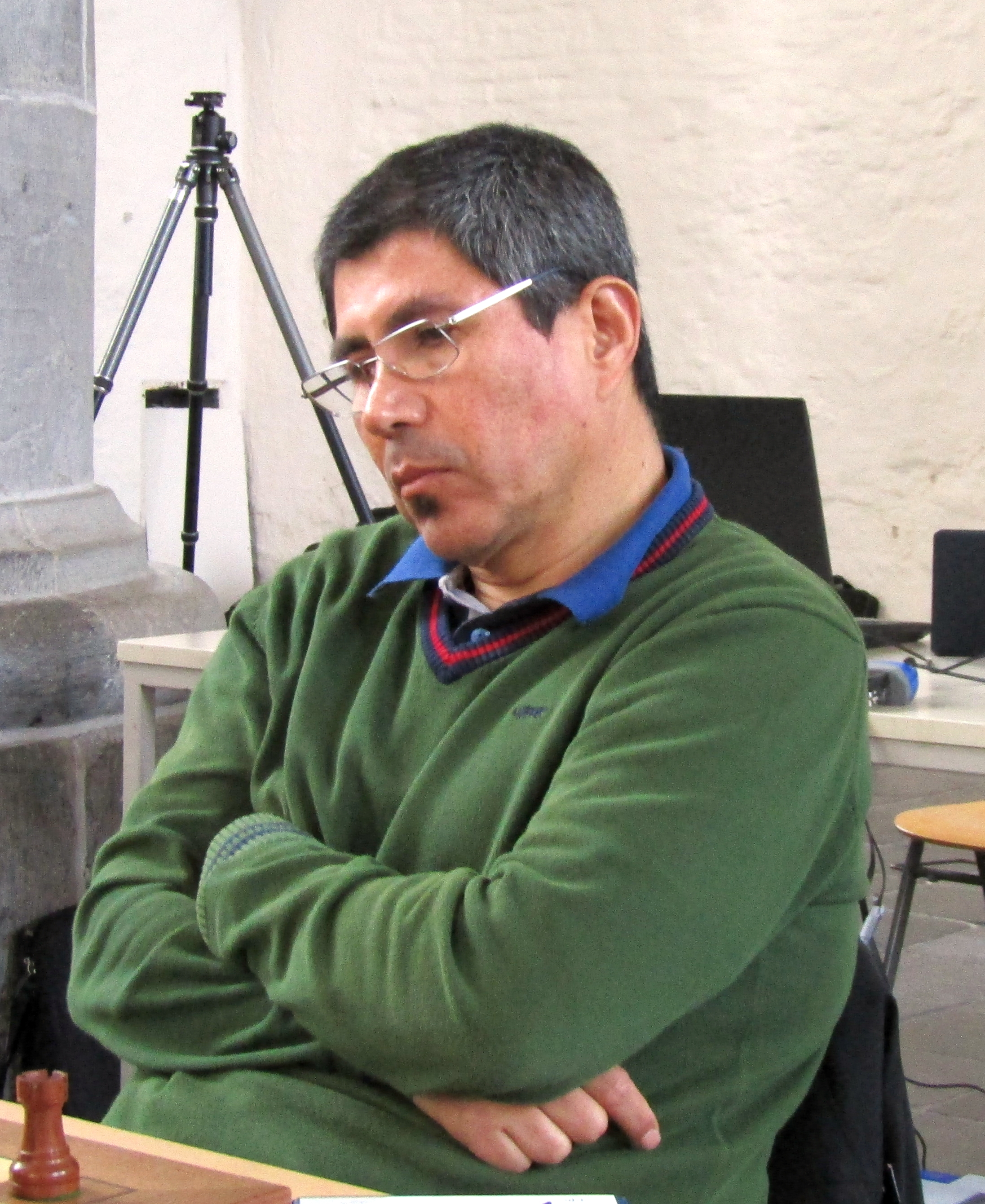
- Granda in 2017

Personal information
- Born: Julio Ernesto Granda Zúñiga; February 25, 1967 (age 59) Camaná, Peru

Chess career
- Country: Peru
- Title: Grandmaster (1986)
- FIDE rating: 2606 (July 2026)
- Peak rating: 2699 (June 2016)
- Peak ranking: No. 25 (January 1992)

Julio Ernesto Granda Zúñiga (born February 25, 1967) is a Peruvian chess grandmaster and four-time champion of the Americas.

== Career ==
Born in Camaná, he learned how to play chess at the age of five. In 1980 he won the World Infant Cup in Mazatlàn, Mexico. In 1984 Granda won the Pan American Junior Chess Championship in Lima. By the age of 19, he had obtained the title of Grandmaster by the FIDE, the World Chess Federation, after surpassing the chess rating of 2500. He finished 1st with Bent Larsen at Mar del Plata 1993. He is a five-time chess champion of Peru, winning in 1994, 1995, 1996, 1997, and 2002. Granda won the 4th American Continental Championship at Cali 2007 on tie-break between the five first-place finishers at 8/11. This victory qualified him for the Chess World Cup 2007 where he lost his first round match to Arkadij Naiditsch ½–1½. In 2008 he won the 2nd Iberoamerican Championship in Linares, Spain by defeating in the final Eduardo Iturrizaga 2½-1½.

In December 2009, he tied for 1st–4th with Georg Meier, Viktor Láznička and Kiril Georgiev in the 19th Magistral Pamplona Tournament. In 2010, he won the 5th Torneo Abierto in Guadalajara. In 2011 he tied for 2nd–7th with Aleksander Delchev, Ivan Šarić, Pablo Almagro Llamas, Maxim Turov and Mihail Marin the 31st Villa de Benasque Open. In the Chess World Cup 2013 in Tromsø, Norway, Granda reached round four, after knocking out Hrant Melkumyan, Peter Leko and Anish Giri. He was however defeated by Fabiano Caruana with two losses.

Julio Granda played for Peru in the Chess Olympiads of 1986, 1988, 1990, 1992, 1994, 1996, 2002, 2004, 2006, 2010 and 2014.

Granda tied for first place with Samuel Shankland, Alexander Shabalov, Rafael Leitao, Isan Reynaldo Ortiz Suarez and Alan Pichot at the 9th American Continental Chess Championship in 2014. Thanks to a better tiebreak score he took the gold medal. To earn a spot in the FIDE World Cup, he played a rapid playoff with the five other players who finished joint first. He came second with 3/5 and qualified for the World Cup 2015. Here he knocked out Alexandr Fier in the first round, Cristobal Henriquez Villagra in the second, then he lost to Radoslaw Wojtaszek in the third. In 2017, Granda won the 50+ section of the World Senior Chess Championship in Acqui Terme, Italy.

== Notable chess games ==
- Julio Ernesto Granda-Zuniga vs Yasser Seirawan, Buenos Aires, 1993, English Opening: Anglo-Indian Defense, King's Knight Variation (A15), 1-0
- Julio Ernesto Granda-Zuniga vs Gata Kamsky, cat. 16 1996, Queen's Indian Defense: Fianchetto, Check Variation Intermezzo Line (E15), 1-0
- Julio Ernesto Granda-Zuniga vs Alexander Beliavsky, Bled Olympiad 2002, Bird Opening: General (A02), 1-0
- Julio Ernesto Granda-Zuniga vs Rafael Duailibe Leitao, Copa ENTEL 2004, Slav Defense: Chameleon Variation (D15), 1-0
