= Pablo Almagro Llamas =

Spanish chess player (born 1983)

Personal information
- Born: November 21, 1983 (age 42) Madrid, Spain

Chess career
- Country: Spain
- Title: International Master (2009)
- FIDE rating: 2431 (July 2026)
- Peak rating: 2500 (April 2014)

Pablo Almagro Llamas is a Spanish chess player.

== Chess career ==
He was the 2011 Spanish University Champion, during which he was a student of the National University of Distance Education.

In 2011, he tied for 2nd-7th with Julio Granda, Ivan Šarić, Aleksander Delchev, Maxim Turov and Mihail Marin at the 31st Villa de Benasque Open.

In July 2014, he tied for 5th place in the 5th Iberoamerican Individual Chess Championship, but was ranked in 14th place after tiebreak scores.
