= Ivan Šarić (chess player) =

Croatian chess grandmaster (born 1990)

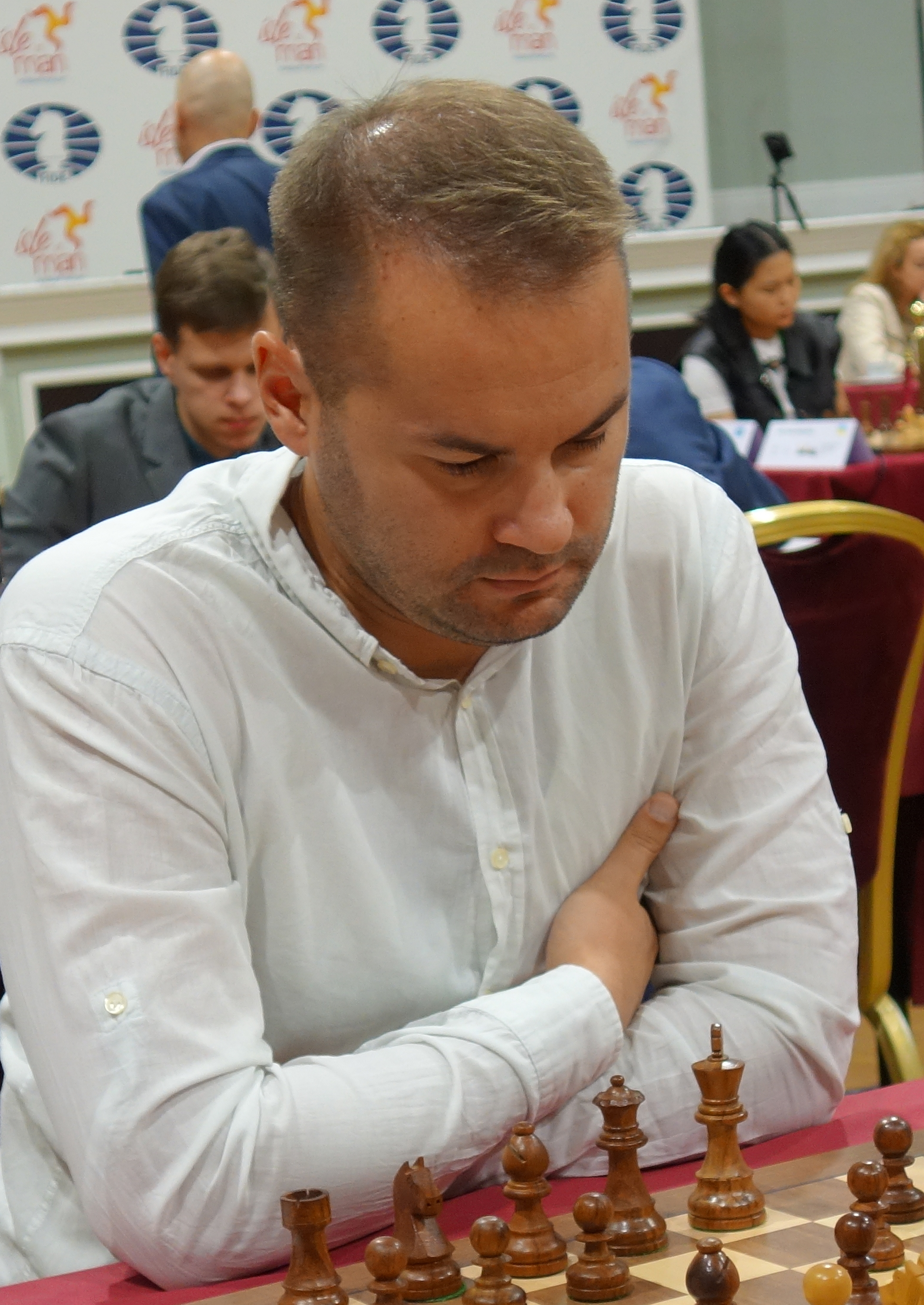
- Šarić in 2023

Personal information
- Born: 17 August 1990 (age 35) Split, SR Croatia, SFR Yugoslavia

Chess career
- Country: Croatia
- Title: Grandmaster (2008)
- FIDE rating: 2623 (July 2026)
- Peak rating: 2703 (March 2019)
- Peak ranking: No. 37 (June 2024)

Ivan Šarić (Croatian pronunciation: [ǐʋan ʃǎːritɕ]; born 17 August 1990) is a Croatian chess grandmaster. He earned his IM title in 2007, and his GM title in 2008. He won the Under-18 European Youth Chess Championship in 2007, and the Under-18 World Youth Chess Championship in 2008. In 2018 he won the European Individual Chess Championship in Batumi with a score of 8.5/11 points. He has also won the Croatian Chess Championship in 2009 and 2013, and holds a notable victory over Magnus Carlsen, achieved at the 2014 Chess Olympiad.

== Early life ==
Born in Split on 17 August 1990, his father taught him to play chess at the age of five. He took up the sport seriously when he was nine and began to compete in club and youth tournaments before venturing out into the international chess scene.

== Chess career ==
He finished 8th in the 2002 Under-12 European Youth Chess Championship, tying with Magnus Carlsen on 6 points while Ian Nepomniachtchi won with 8.

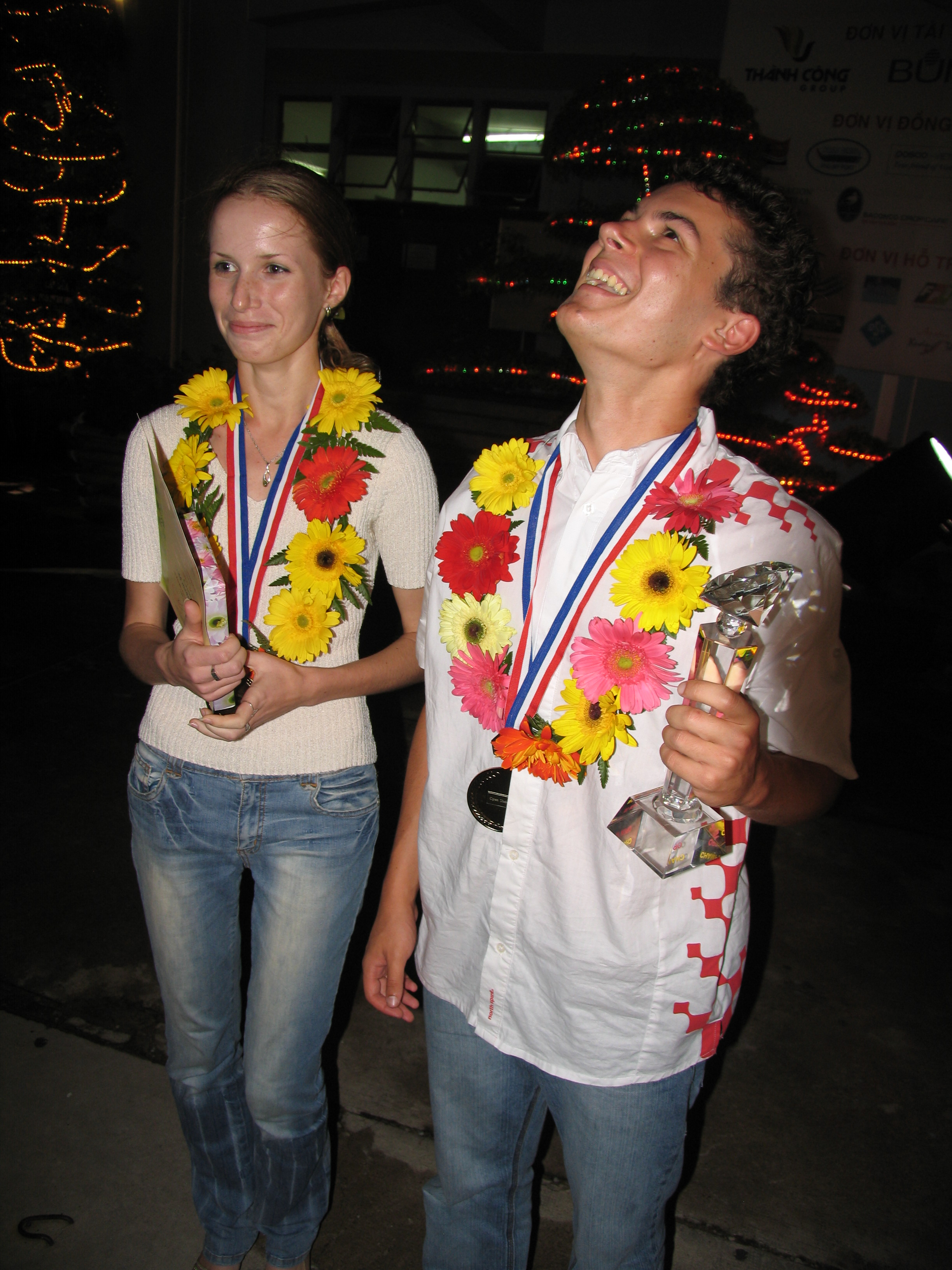
Ivan Šarić and Valentina Golubenko at the World Youth Chess Championship, 2008

In 2007 he became internationally known when he won the Under-18 division at the European Youth Chess Championship in Šibenik, scoring 7 out of 9. The following year he earned the grandmaster title and won the 2008 Under-18 World Youth Chess Championship, scoring 8 points in 11 games for a performance rating of 2623.

He has won the Croatian Chess Championships of 2009 and 2013, and has played for the Croatian national team since 2009.

In 2011 he tied for 2nd–7th with Julio Granda, Aleksander Delchev, Maxim Turov, Pablo Almagro Llamas and Mihail Marin at the 31st Villa de Benasque Open.

Šarić won the Tata Steel Challengers tournament in 2014 with a score of 10/13 points. As a result, he qualified for the 2015 Tata Steel Masters, where he finished in 12th place scoring 4.5/11.

One of his most notable results to date was a victory over Magnus Carlsen at the 2014 Chess Olympiad, where Šarić finished with a 7/11 score.

In 2018 he won the European Individual Chess Championship in Batumi with a score of 8.5/11 points and became the second player from Croatia who managed to achieve this title after Zdenko Kožul, who has won it in 2006.

== Personal life ==
He graduated in 2013 with a bachelor's degree in Computer Science from the University of Split, and he lives in Omiš, Croatia, with his wife and daughter.
