= Mihail Marin =

Romanian chess grandmaster and writer (born 1965)

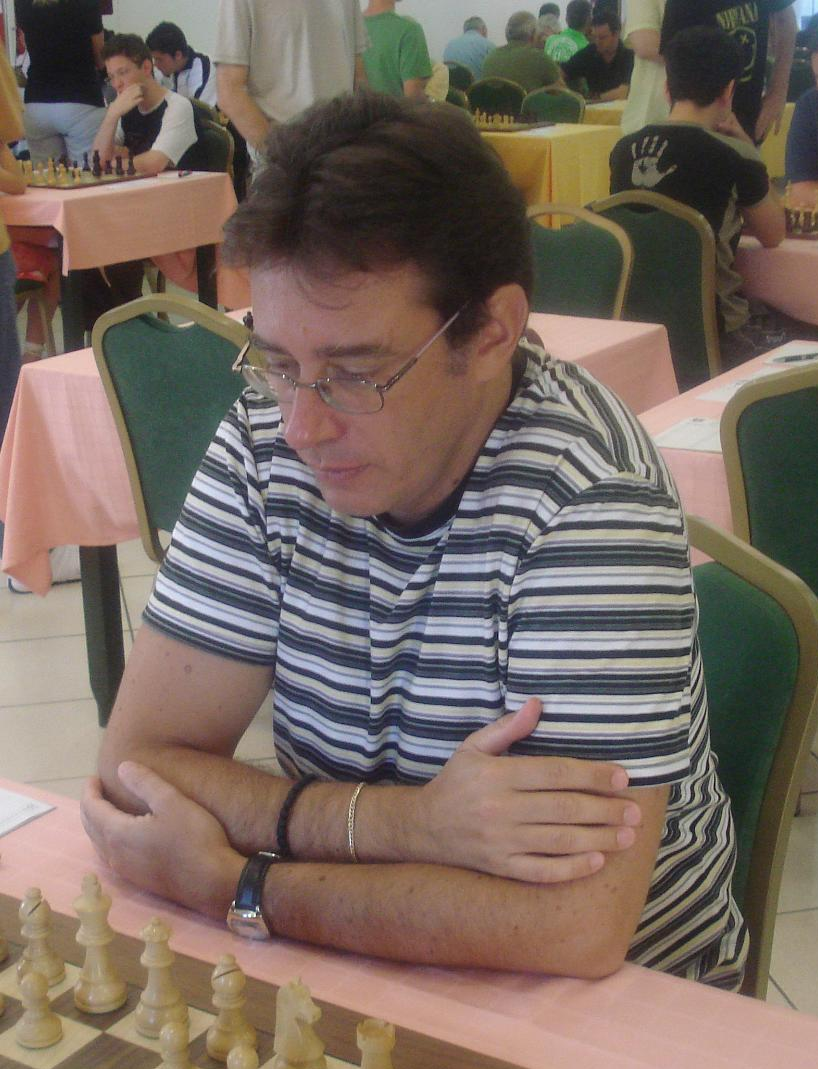
- Marin in 2008

Personal information
- Born: April 21, 1965 (age 61) Bucharest, Romania

Chess career
- Country: Romania
- Title: Grandmaster (1993)
- Peak rating: 2616 (September 2009)
- Peak ranking: No. 86 (January 2001)

Mihail Marin (born 21 April 1965) is a Romanian chess player and writer. He was awarded the title of Grandmaster by FIDE. Marin's first major success in international chess was in qualifying for the Interzonal in 1987. He has won three Romanian Championships and has played in the Chess Olympiads twelve times, winning a bronze individual medal in 1988. For several years he was editor of the magazine Chess Extrapress.

In 2011 he tied for 2nd-7th with Julio Granda, Ivan Šarić, Aleksander Delchev, Maxim Turov and Pablo Almagro Llamas at the 31st Villa de Benasque Open.

Marin has written a number of well-received books: Secrets of Chess Defence (Gambit Publications, 2003, ISBN 1-901983-91-9), Learn from the Legends: Chess Champions at Their Best (Quality Chess, 2004, ISBN 91-975243-2-8), Secrets of Attacking Chess (Gambit Publications, 2005, ISBN 1-904600-30-1), Beating the Open Games (Quality Chess, 2007, ISBN 91-976004-3-1, ISBN 978-91-976004-3-9), A Spanish Opening Repertoire for Black (Quality Chess, 2007, ISBN 91-976005-0-4, ISBN 978-91-976005-0-7), Reggio Emilia 2007/2008 (together with Yuri Garrett - Quality Chess, 2009, ISBN 978-1-906552-32-9) and The English Opening vol. 1 and vol. 2 (Quality Chess, 2009).

Learn from the Legends was named the 2005 ChessCafe Book of the Year, and was nominated for the 2004 BCF Book of the Year. Secrets of Chess Defence was nominated for the 2003 ChessCafe Book of the Year. International Master Jeremy Silman, himself a prize-winning author of chess books, has called Marin "one of the world's finest chess writers" and wrote of Learn from the Legends, "I can't recall having seen a better book in the last two decades".
