= Robert Zelčić =

Croatian chess grandmaster (born 1965)

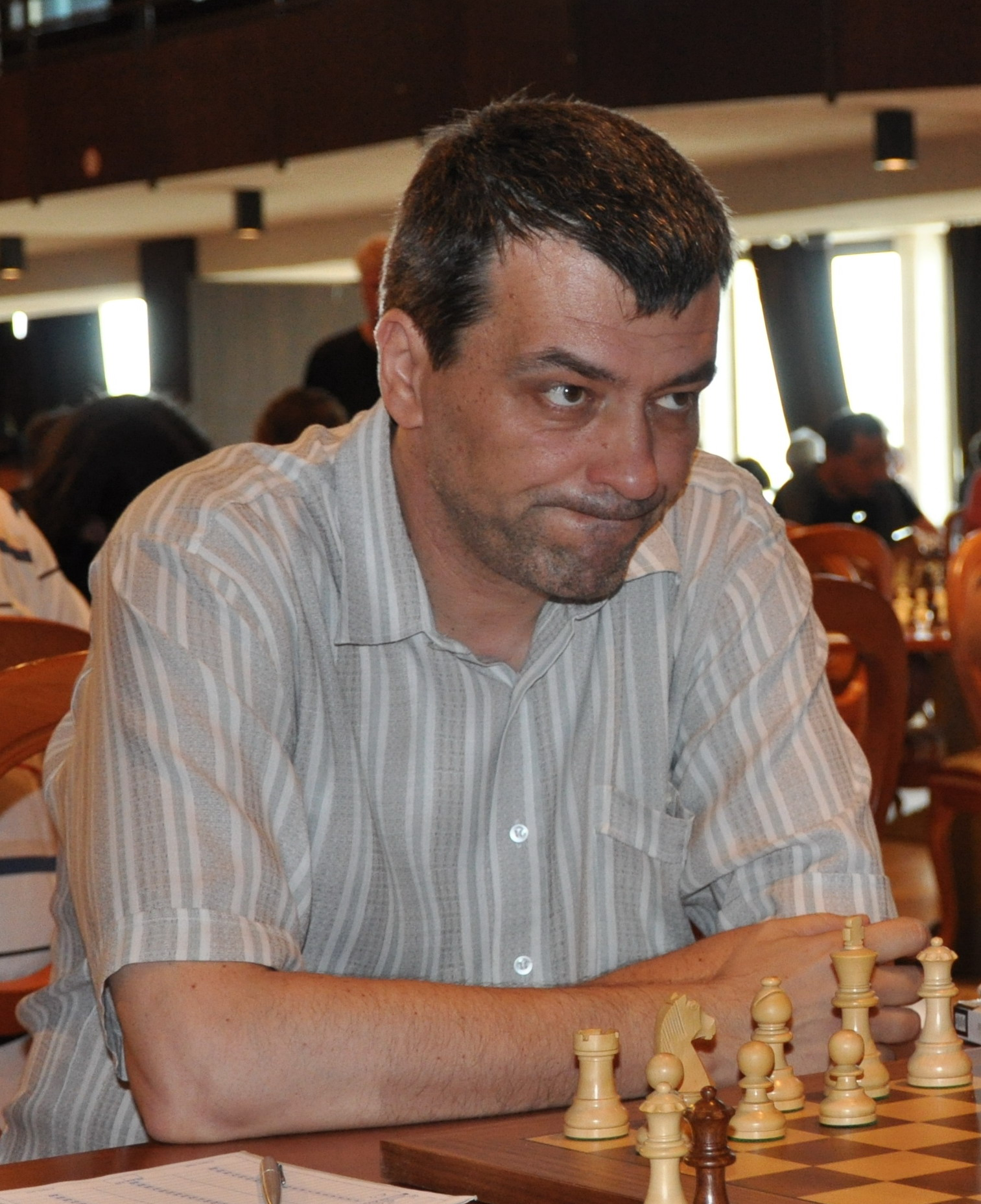
- Zelčić in 2011

Personal information
- Born: September 21, 1965 (age 60) Zagreb, Yugoslavia

Chess career
- Country: Croatia
- Title: Grandmaster (1997)
- FIDE rating: 2448 (July 2026)
- Peak rating: 2593 (July 2008)

Robert Zelčić is a Croatian chess grandmaster.

== Chess career ==
In December 2012 at the Zadar Open, Zelčić was one of a few grandmasters who were defeated by Borislav Ivanov, who was later found to have been cheating.

In July 2020, Zelčić finished as runner up in the Croatian Chess Championship, alongside Zdenko Kožul, Hrvoje Stević and Ante Brkić.

In November 2023, Zelčić participated in the Tournament of Peace in Zagreb. He was the lowest-rated player in the field, but managed to hold draws against higher-rated players such as Ante Brkić and Anton Korobov.
