= Mladen Palac =

Croatian chess grandmaster (born 1971)

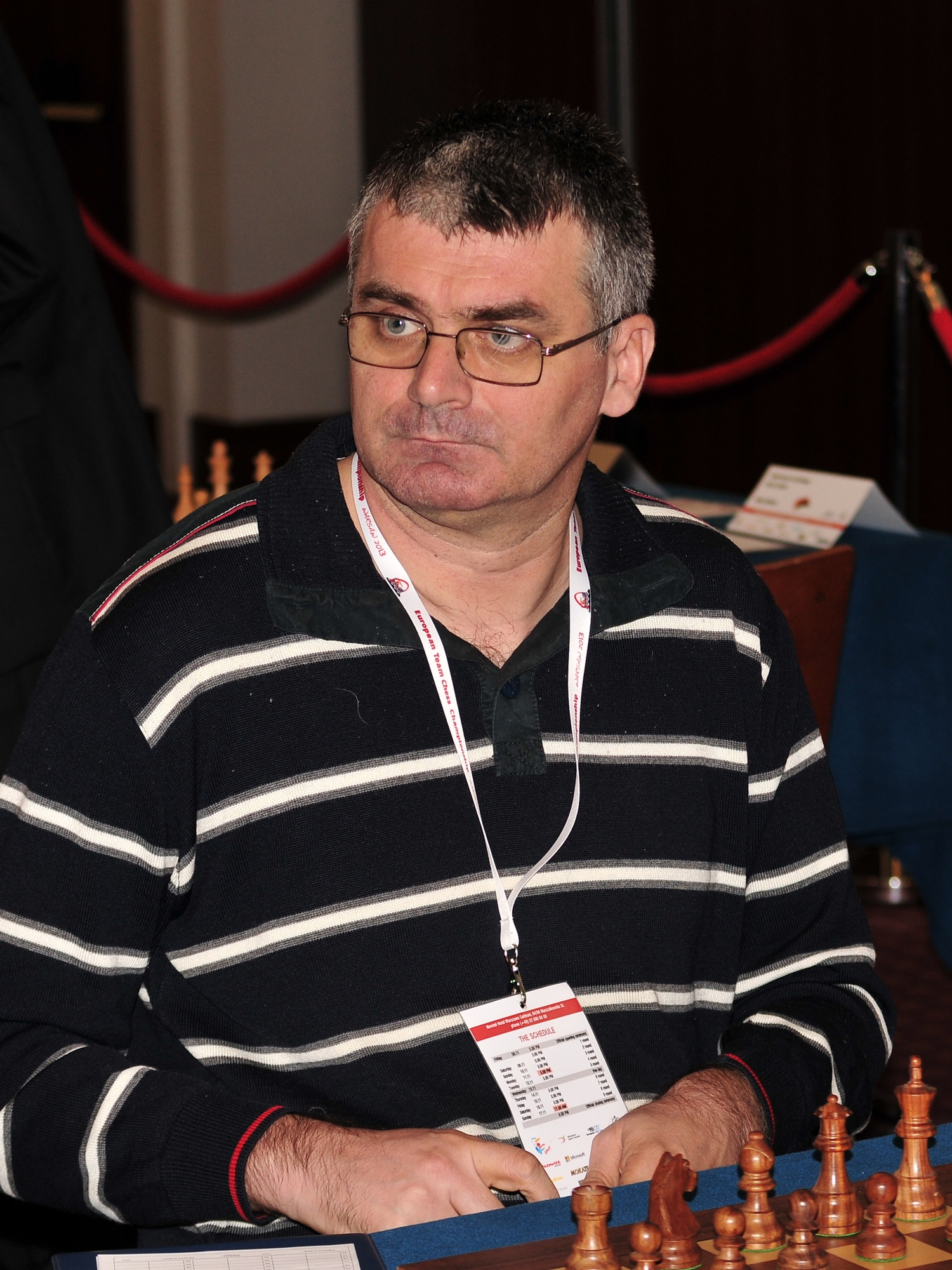
- Palac in Warsaw, 2013

Personal information
- Born: 18 February 1971 (age 55) Donji Mamići, Socialist Republic of Bosnia and Herzegovina, Yugoslavia

Chess career
- Country: Yugoslavia → Croatia
- Title: Grandmaster (1993)
- FIDE rating: 2455 (July 2026)
- Peak rating: 2631 (July 2016)
- Peak ranking: No. 65 (July 1999)

Mladen Palac (born 18 February 1971) is a Croatian chess player. He holds the title of Grandmaster, which FIDE awarded him in 1993.

Palac was born in Donji Mamići, Bosnia and Herzegovina (then Yugoslavia). In 1998 he won the Biel Grandmaster Tournament. Palac became the Croatian national champion for the first time in 2001, when he was the highest finishing Croatian player in the Pula Open. He took the national champion title three more times by winning the Croatian Chess Championship in 2004, 2008 and 2012. In 2005 he was awarded the title of FIDE Trainer. Palac finished third in the European Blitz Championship of 2006. He finished 16th at the European Individual Chess Championship in 2016 and, being among the top 23, qualified for the FIDE World Cup 2017. Here he lost to Ian Nepomniachtchi in the first round after the tiebreakers and was therefore eliminated from the tournament.

In team competitions, Palac played for Yugoslavia in the Boys' Chess Balkaniad 1989 and for Croatia in the Chess Olympiad, World Team Chess Championship, European Team Chess Championship and Mitropa Cup.
