= Ivan Sokolov =

Ivan Sokolov may refer to:

- Ivan Sokolov (chess player) (born 1968), a Dutch chess grandmaster
- Ivan Sokolov (composer) (born 1960), a Russian composer
- Ivan Sokolov (painter) (1823–1918), a Russian painter
- Ivan Sokolov, a Russian Greco-Roman wrestler from Buriki One fighting game
