= Mara Jelica =

Croatian chess player (born 1974)

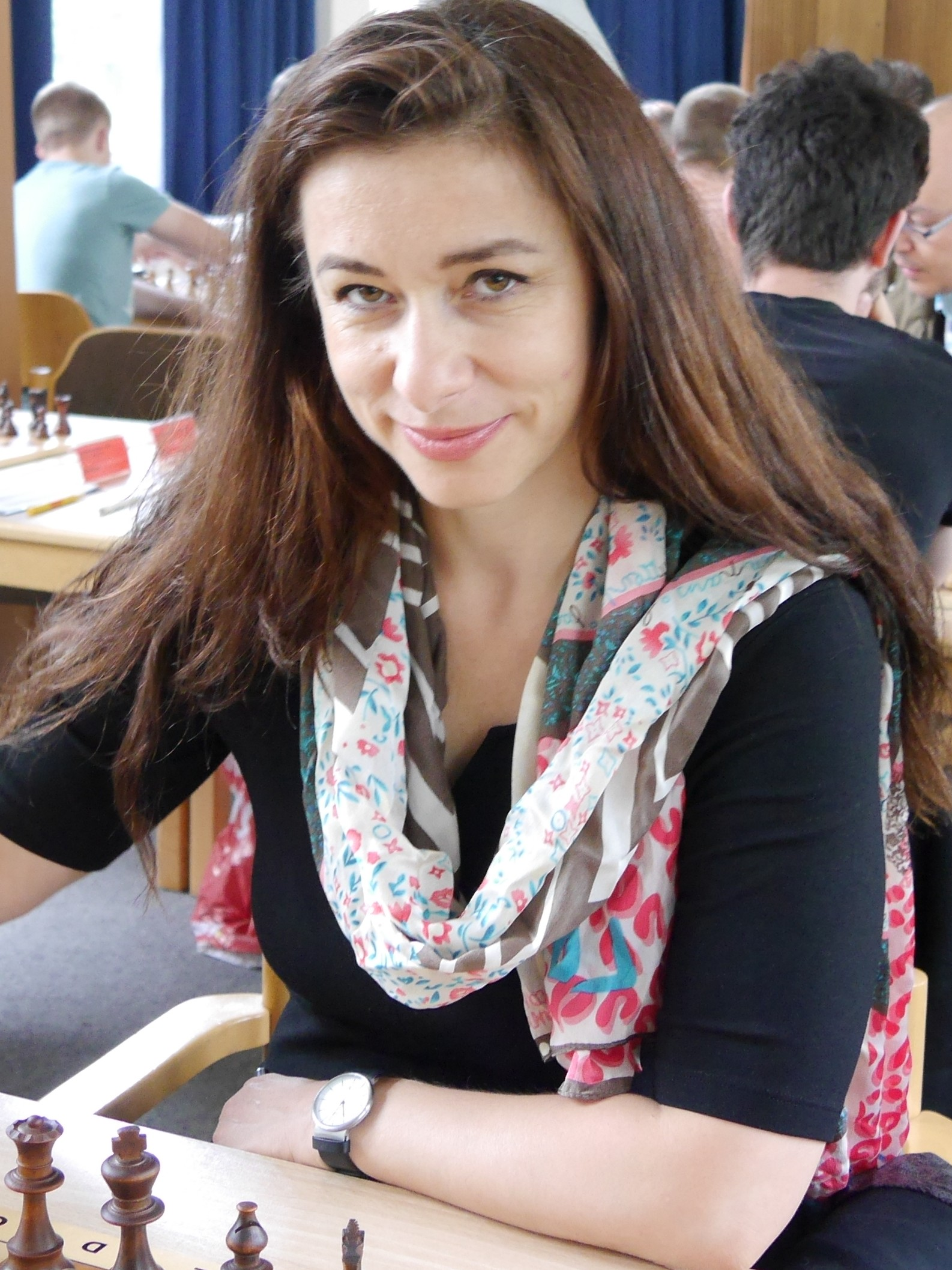
- Jelica in 2016

Personal information
- Born: 1 January 1974 (age 52) Jajce, SR Bosnia and Herzegovina, SFR Yugoslavia

Chess career
- Country: Yugoslavia → Croatia
- Title: Woman International Master (1996)
- Peak rating: 2258 (May 2012)

Mara Jelica (née Đeno; born 1 January 1974) is a Croatian chess player. She has held the FIDE title of Woman International Master since 1996. In 2020, she was awarded the title FIDE Instructor.
