= Donji Mamići =

Village in Grude, Bosnia and Herzegovina

- Village
- Location within Bosnia and Herzegovina
- Coordinates: 43°20′40″N 17°29′15″E
- Country: Bosnia and Herzegovina
- Entity: Federation of Bosnia and Herzegovina
- Canton: West Herzegovina
- Municipality: Grude

Area
  - Total: 9.54 sq mi (24.70 km^{2})

Population (2013)
  - Total: 1,529
  - Density: 160.3/sq mi (61.90/km^{2})
- Time zone: UTC+1 (CET)
  - Summer (DST): UTC+2 (CEST)

Donji Mamići is a village in Bosnia and Herzegovina. According to the 1991 census, the village is located in the municipality of Grude. It is located in the municipality of Grude, in the canton of West Herzegovina and in the Federation of Bosnia and Herzegovina.

== Demographics ==
According to the 2013 census, its population was 1,529.

Ethnicity in 2013
Ethnicity	Number	Percentage
Croats	1,522	99.5%
Serbs	1	0.1%
other/undeclared	6	0.4%
Total	1,529	100%
