= Alojzije Janković =

Croatian chess grandmaster (born 1983)

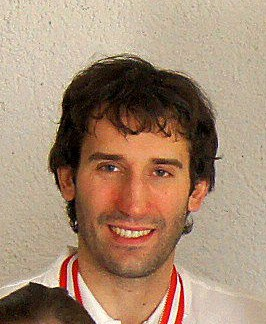
- Janković, 2012

Personal information
- Born: 2 April 1983 (age 43) Vinkovci, Croatia

Chess career
- Country: Croatia
- Title: Grandmaster (2006)
- FIDE rating: 2530 (November 2026)
- Peak rating: 2593 (January 2017)

Alojzije Janković (born 2 April 1983) is a Croatian chess player. He holds the title of Grandmaster, which FIDE awarded him in 2006. His peak Elo rating is 2593.

== Chess career ==
Also in 2006 Janković won the Zagreb Open tournament, held in his native city. He was multiple-time cadet and junior Croatian champion. He shared first place in the Croatian Championship in 2010 and won it in January 2015 to become the 2014 champion of Croatia. Janković played many times for the Croatian national team. His other successes are: winning Sarajevo 2006 Sabadell Open 2008, International Styrian Open 2014, winning Mitropa cups in 2004 and 2013, shared first at Sitges Open 2008...

He was the editor-in-chief of Šahovski glasnik (Chess Journal), the monthly magazine of the Croatian Chess Federation. Janković co-authored the book The Richter-Rauzer Reborn, published by Thinkers Publishing in 2014. with second edition in 2019. He is an author of the book “ The Grandmaster Mindset“ by Thinkers Publishing, released in 2020.

In 2020 his OFEL conference paper “Chess as a Powerful Educational Tool for Successful People” was published in a scientific journal. Contributor to the New in Chess Yearbooks

He is also the host of the weekly 20 minutes show "Šahovski komentar" (Chess Commentary), aired every Sunday on the HRT 3. He holds titles of Fide Trainer and FIDE Organizer. Janković is the Fide Zone 1.2. President with member countries(Israel, Switzerland, Germany, Austria, Slovenia, Croatia, Bosnia and Herzegovina, North Macedonia and Kosovo). Also he is the Vice President of Croatian Association for Sport Management and board member of Mediterranean Chess Association.

He finished the Faculty of Economics in Zagreb and Sport management Master study at Aspira University College.

He was the General secretary of the Croatian Chess Federation from 2016 to 2025. He was dismissed by a decision of the executive board due to activities that resulted in a large financial deficit.

Currently he is serving as the Vice President of European Chess Union.
