= Ante Brkić =

Croatian chess grandmaster (born 1988)

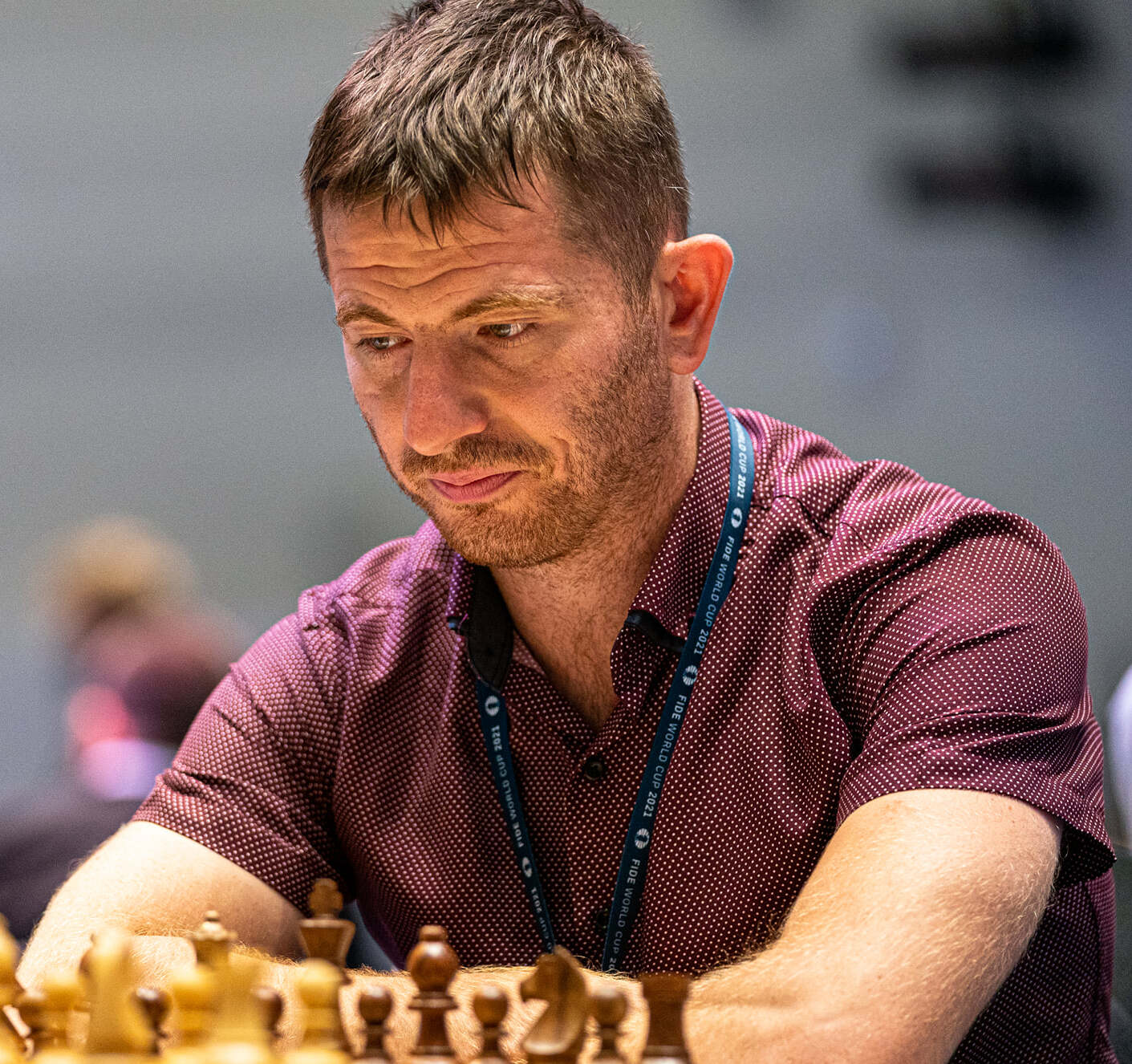
- Ante Brkić at the World Cup 2021 in Sochi

Personal information
- Born: March 31, 1988 (age 38) Stari Mikanovci, Croatia

Chess career
- Country: Croatia
- Title: Grandmaster (2007)
- FIDE rating: 2610 (July 2026)
- Peak rating: 2645 (June 2024)
- Peak ranking: No. 91 (September 2024)

Ante Brkić (born 31 March 1988) is a Croatian chess grandmaster.

== Chess career ==
He won the Croatian Chess Championship in 2010 and has represented his country in a number of Chess Olympiads, including 2004 (2/4 on board 6), 2006 (3.5/5 on board 6), 2012 (2.5/6 on board 4), 2016 (6/10 on board 5) and 2018 (5/8 on board 4).

He played in the Chess World Cup 2015, where he was defeated in the first round by Laurent Fressinet.

In 2019, he won the 26th Zadar Open with 7/9 points.

He qualified again for the Chess World Cup 2021 where, ranked 102nd, he defeated Sergio Barrientos 2-0 in the first round, 27th seed Yuriy Kryvoruchko 1.5-0.5 in the second round and Salem Saleh 2-0 in the third round. In the Chess World Cup 2025, he lost to the youngest player in the tournament Faustino Oro 3.0-5.0 in the first round.
