= Zdenko Kožul =

Croatian chess grandmaster (born 1966)

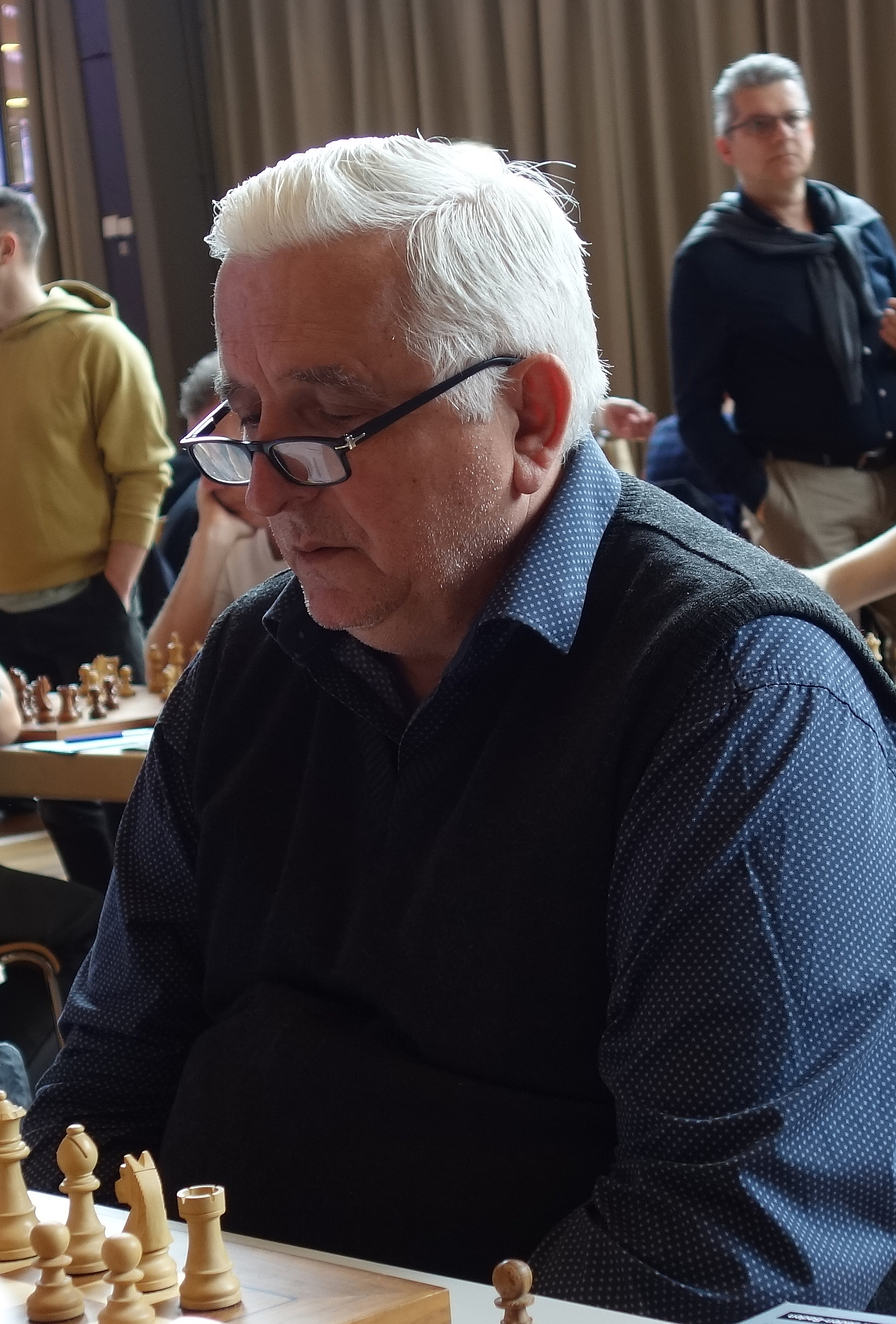
- Kožul in 2024

Personal information
- Born: 21 May 1966 (age 60) Bihać, SR Bosnia and Herzegovina, Yugoslavia

Chess career
- Country: Yugoslavia; Bosnia and Herzegovina; Croatia
- Title: Grandmaster (1989)
- FIDE rating: 2497 (July 2026)
- Peak rating: 2640 (October 2004)
- Peak ranking: No. 40 (January 1990)

Zdenko Kožul (born 21 May 1966) is a Croatian chess player. He holds the title of Grandmaster and was the 2006 European champion.

== Chess career ==
Born in the north-western Bosnian town of Bihać (then Socialist Federal Republic of Yugoslavia), Kožul was awarded the title of Grandmaster by FIDE in 1989. In 1989 and 1990, Kozul won consecutive Yugoslavian championships. Also in 1990, Kozul won the bronze medal playing for the Yugoslav team at the Chess Olympiad in Novi Sad.

After the break-up of Yugoslavia, Kozul played for Bosnia and Herzegovina, and he was a part of the Bosnian team in the Olympiad 1992. In 1993, Kozul, an ethnic Croat, settled in Croatia, thereafter representing that country. In 1995, he won an open tournament in Zadar. In 1999, he came first at the 4th Nova Gorica Open. In 2003, he won the 11th Vasja Pirc Memorial at Maribor.

In 2004, Kožul reached the final sixteen at the FIDE World Chess Championship, 2004 in Tripoli, before being eliminated by the Bulgarian grandmaster and future world champion Veselin Topalov. In 2006 he won the European Individual Chess Championship in Kuşadası. This achievement qualified him to the FIDE World Cup 2007. Kožul won the Croatian Chess Championships of 2006 and 2015.

In March 2012, Kožul came first in the Zagreb Open.

In April 2017, he finished tied for first with Nikita Vitiugov, Etienne Bacrot and Maxim Matlakov in the Grenke Chess Open in Karlsruhe, Germany.

== Notable games ==
- Alexey Shirov vs Zdenko Kozul, Cup European Club (final) 1996, Sicilian Defense: Richter-Rauzer, Neo-Modern Variation (B67), 0-1
- Joel Benjamin vs Zdenko Kozul, WchT 4th 1997, Sicilian Defense: Richter-Rauzer, Neo-Modern Variation (B67), 0-1
- Zdenko Kozul vs Sergei Rublevsky, FIDE World Championship Knockout Tournament 2004, Slav Defense: Quiet Variation (D11), 1-0

== Books ==
- Kozul, Zdenko; Jankovic, Alojzje (2014). The Richter Rauzer Reborn: restyle your repertoire with the razor-sharp Kozul variation. Thinkers Publishing. ISBN 978-9082256604.
