= Boris Koyalovich =

Boris Mikhailovich Koyalovich (Koyalovitch, Kojalovich, Kojalowitsch, Kojałowicz) (May 2, 1867 – December 29, 1941) was a mathematician and chess master from the Russian Empire and later the Soviet Union.

== Biography ==
Koyalovich was born on May 2, 1867. He was a professor of mathematics at the Saint Petersburg State Institute of Technology. In 1924 he was an Invited Speaker of the ICM in Toronto. In 1930, he developed the special theory of limitants.

Koyalovich lived and died in St. Petersburg (also known as Petrograd and Leningrad during his lifetime) on December 29, 1941. He played in many of the city's chess tournaments, taking 4th place in 1901 (Sergey Lebedev won), 3rd in 1902 (Mikhail Chigorin and Alexander Levin won), and 11th in 1903 (Grigory Helbach, Krzyzanowski and Emmanuel Schiffers won). In 1904 he competed at three events, tying for 4-5th in one (Eugene Znosko-Borovsky won), taking 5th in another (Chigorin won), and winning the third. He tied for 4-5th in 1905 (Chigorin won), tied for 8-9th in 1906 (Simon Alapin won), and tied for 5-6th in 1907 (Sergey von Freymann won).

He played in a friendly match St. Petersburg vs. Moscow in 1911 (won a game against Parfenov on board 7), and won a game against Alexander Alekhine in St. Petersburg in April 1912.

After World War I, he tied for 5-9th at Petrograd 1921 (R.R. Platz won), took 6th at Novgorod 1923/24 (Ilya Rabinovich won), took 9th at Leningrad 1925 (Solomon Gotthilf won), and tied for 6-7th at Leningrad 1925 (Efim Bogoljubow and Peter Romanovsky won).

== Selected publications ==
- Теория вероятностей. Лекции, читанные в СПБ ин-те в 1892-93 уч. (Probability theory. Lectures read at the St. Petersburg Institute in 1892-93 academic year.) году. СПБ, лит. Ф. Кремера, 1893
- Исследования о дифференциальном уравнении ydy-ydx= Rdx. (Studies on the differential equation ydy-ydx = Rdx.) СПБ, тип. АН, 1894.
- Лекции по аналитической геометрии (в пространстве). (Lectures on analytic geometry (in space).) СПБ, лит. А. Иконникова, 1895.
- Лекции по математике (высшая алгебра), читанные на 1 курсе технол. (Lectures on mathematics (higher algebra), read at the 1st course of technology.) Ин-та проф. Б. М. Кояловичем в 1900-01 уч. Году. СПБ, лит. Я. Кровицкого, 1901.
- Об одном уравнении с частными производными четвертого порядка. (On a fourth-order partial differential equation.) СПБ, тип. АН, 1902
- Записки по дифференциальному исчислению. (Notes on differential calculus.) Курс. Доп. Кл. Константиновского арт. Училища. СПБ, лит. Константиновского арт. Училища, 1903.
- Теория дифференциальных уравнений. (The theory of differential equations.) СПБ, изд. Мл. класса Академии, 1908
- Интегральное исчисление. (Integral calculus.) СПБ, типо-лит. И. А. Трофимова, 1909.
- Конспект курса аналитической механики. (Abstract course of analytical mechanics.) СПБ, типо-лит. И. А. Трофимова, 1909.
- Аналитическая геометрия. (Analytic geometry.) Пб, Academia, 1922
