= Kiev 1903 chess tournament =

The 3rd All-Russian Masters' Tournament took place in the rooms of the Kiev Chess Society in the Popov Building at No. 29 Kreshchatyk in Kiev on September 1–26, 1903. The Society used the rooms of the Kiev Bicycle Association which had its premises on the second floor of the aforementioned building on the corner of the Kreshchatyk & Lutheran (#29 Kreshchatyk) right next door to the Warsaw Café.

A Polish nobleman, count A.F. Plater, the president of the Kiev Chess Society (Kievskoye Shakhmatnoye Obshchestvo) was the tournament patron, Loxting and Vengerov were tournament officials.

The results and standings:

| # | Player | City | Country | 1 | 2 | 3 | 4 | 5 | 6 | 7 | 8 | 9 | 10 | 11 | 12 | 13 | 14 | 15 | 16 | 17 | 18 | 19 | Total |
|---|---|---|---|---|---|---|---|---|---|---|---|---|---|---|---|---|---|---|---|---|---|---|---|
| 1 | Mikhail Chigorin | Saint Petersburg | Russia | x | 0 | 0 | 1 | 1 | 1 | 1 | 1 | 1/2 | 1 | 1 | 1 | 1 | 1 | + | 1 | 1/2 | 1 | 1 | 15.0 |
| 2 | Ossip Bernstein | Zhytomyr | Ukraine | 1 | x | 1 | 1/2 | 1 | 0 | 1/2 | 1/2 | 1/2 | 1 | 1 | 1 | 1 | 0 | 1 | 1 | 1 | 1 | + | 14.0 |
| 3 | Vladimir Yurevich | Moscow | Russia | 1 | 0 | x | 1/2 | 0 | 1 | 1 | 1 | 0 | 1 | 0 | 1 | 1 | 1 | 1 | 1 | 1 | 1 | 1 | 13.5 |
| 4 | Gersz Salwe | Łódź | Poland | 0 | 1/2 | 1/2 | x | 1/2 | 1 | 1 | 0 | 1 | 1 | 1 | 0 | 1 | 1/2 | 1 | 1 | 1 | 1 | + | 13.0 |
| 5 | Akiba Rubinstein | Łódź | Poland | 0 | 0 | 1 | 1/2 | x | 1/2 | 0 | 1/2 | 1 | 1 | 0 | 1 | 1 | 1 | 0 | 1 | 1 | 1 | + | 11.5 |
| 6 | Eugene Znosko-Borovsky | Saint Petersburg | Russia | 0 | 1 | 0 | 0 | 1/2 | x | 1/2 | 1 | 0 | 1/2 | 1 | 1/2 | 1 | 0 | 1 | 1 | 1 | 1 | + | 11.0 |
| 7 | Moishe Lowtzky | Kiev | Ukraine | 0 | 1/2 | 0 | 0 | 1 | 1/2 | x | 1/2 | 1 | 1 | 1 | 1/2 | 0 | 1 | 1/2 | 1 | 1/2 | 1 | 1 | 11.0 |
| 8 | Stepan Levitsky | Nizhny Tagil | Russia | 0 | 1/2 | 0 | 1 | 1/2 | 0 | 1/2 | x | 0 | 0 | 1 | 1 | 1 | 1 | 1 | 0 | 1 | 1 | 1 | 10.5 |
| 9 | Stefan Izbinsky | Kiev | Ukraine | 1/2 | 1/2 | 1 | 0 | 0 | 1 | 0 | 1 | x | 0 | 1 | 1 | 0 | 1 | 0 | 0 | 1/2 | 1 | 1 | 9.5 |
| 10 | Sergey Lebedev | Saint Petersburg | Russia | 0 | 0 | 0 | 0 | 0 | 1/2 | 0 | 1 | 1 | x | 1 | 1 | 1/2 | 0 | 1/2 | 1 | 1 | 1 | 1 | 9.5 |
| 11 | Abram Rabinovich | Vilna | Lithuania | 0 | 0 | 1 | 0 | 1 | 0 | 0 | 0 | 0 | 0 | x | 0 | 1 | 1 | 1/2 | 1 | 1 | 1 | + | 8.5 |
| 12 | Emanuel Schiffers | Saint Petersburg | Russia | 0 | 0 | 0 | 1 | 0 | 1/2 | 1/2 | 0 | 0 | 0 | 1 | x | 1 | 1 | 1 | 1 | 0 | 1/2 | + | 8.5 |
| 13 | Viacheslav Kulomzin | Kostroma | Russia | 0 | 0 | 0 | 0 | 0 | 0 | 1 | 0 | 1 | 1/2 | 0 | 0 | x | 1 | 1 | 1 | 1 | 1/2 | + | 8.0 |
| 14 | N. Kalinsky | Novokhopersk | Russia | 0 | 1 | 0 | 1/2 | 0 | 1 | 0 | 0 | 0 | 1 | 0 | 0 | 0 | x | 1 | 0 | 1 | 1 | 1 | 7.5 |
| 15 | Fyodor Duz-Khotimirsky | Kiev | Ukraine | - | 0 | 0 | 0 | 1 | 0 | 1/2 | 0 | 1 | 1/2 | 1/2 | 0 | 0 | 0 | x | 1/2 | 1 | 1 | 1 | 7.0 |
| 16 | P.P. Benko | Kiev | Ukraine | 0 | 0 | 0 | 0 | 0 | 0 | 0 | 1 | 1 | 0 | 0 | 0 | 0 | 1 | 1/2 | x | 1 | 1 | 1 | 6.5 |
| 17 | Boris Nikolaev | Kiev | Ukraine | 1/2 | 0 | 0 | 0 | 0 | 0 | 1/2 | 0 | 1/2 | 0 | 0 | 1 | 0 | 0 | 0 | 0 | x | 1 | 1 | 4.5 |
| 18 | Wilhelm von Stamm | Riga | Latvia | 0 | 0 | 0 | 0 | 0 | 0 | 0 | 0 | 0 | 0 | 0 | 1/2 | 1/2 | 0 | 0 | 0 | 0 | x | 1 | 2.0 |
| 19 | V.V. Breev | Kiev | Ukraine | 0 | - | 0 | - | - | - | 0 | 0 | 0 | 0 | - | - | - | 0 | 0 | 0 | 0 | 0 | x | 0.0 |
