= Sergey Lebedev (chess player) =

Russian chess player

Sergey Fedorovich Lebedev (Russian: Серге́й Фёдорович Лебедев; January 1868 – December 1942) was a chess master who lived in the Russian Empire and later the Soviet Union.

== Chess career ==
S.F. Lebedev lived in Saint Petersburg before World War I, during and after the war (Petrograd, Leningrad). He took 4th at Moscow 1899 (the 1st All-Russian Masters' Tournament, Mikhail Chigorin won), took 3rd at St. Petersburg 1900 (Chigorin and Alexander Levin won), tied for 8–10th at Moscow 1900/01 (the 2nd RUS-ch won by Chigorin), thrice won, jointly with Grigory Helbach (1), ahead of Abkin (2), and ahead of Emmanuel Schiffers (3) in St. Petersburg in 1901, and tied for 9–10th in the Kiev 1903 chess tournament (the 3rd RUS-ch, Chigorin won).

He shared 2nd with Simon Alapin, behind Sergey von Freymann, in 1907, won (Quadrangular) in 1908, tied for 7–8th (All-Russian Amateur Tournament, Alexander Alekhine won) in 1909, tied for 1st–3rd with Freymann and Grigory Levenfish in 1910, took 15th (the 8th All-Russian Masters' Tournament (RUS-ch), Alekhine and Aron Nimzowitsch won) in 1913/14, all played in St. Petersburg.

After the war he tied for 11–13th at Petrograd 1923 (the 2nd USSR Chess Championship, Peter Romanovsky won).
