= Grigory Helbach =

Russian chess player

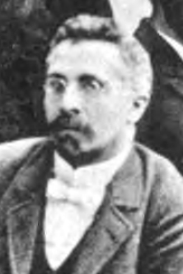
Grigory Helbach

Grigory Helbach (also spelled Hellbach, Gelbach, or Gelbak) (13 January 1863, Zvenyhorodka – 3 August 1930) was a Russian chess master.

He tied for 6-7th at Moscow 1899 (the 1st All-Russian Masters' Tournament, Mikhail Chigorin won), took 6th at St. Petersburg 1900 (Chigorin and Alexander Levin won), shared 1st with Sergey Lebedev at St. Petersburg 1901, took 7th at St. Petersburg 1902, shared 1st at St.Petersburg 1903, took 15th at St. Petersburg 1905/06 (the 4th RUS-ch, Gersz Salwe won), and tied for 15-16th at St. Petersburg 1909 (All-Russian Amateur Tournament, Alexander Alekhine won). He won a game against Alexei Alekhine in a friendly team match St. Petersburg vs. Moscow (6:3) in 1911.
