= Kojałowicz =

Kojałowicz is a Polish-language surname of Lithuanian origin. belonging to the Kojalavičiai family of townspeople and nobles of the Great Duchy of Lithuania. The Lithuanian forms of the surname are Kojalavičius or Kojelavičius. Its Russified form used in Russian Empire which annexed a large part of Poland for a long time is Koyalovich. Notable people with the surname include:

- Albert Wijuk Kojałowicz, also Wojciech Wijuk Kojałowicz, Lithuanian: Albertas Kojelavičius-Vijūkas, Vaitiekus Vijūkas-Kojalavičius (1609–1677), Lithuanian historian, theologian and translator
- Boris Koyalovich (1887–1941), mathematician and chess master from the Russian Empire and later the Soviet Union
- Kazimieras Kojelavičius-Vijūkas (1617–1674) Lithuanian priest, philosopher and writer
- Mikhail Koyalovich (1828–1891), Russian historian, political journalist and publisher of Belarusian descent
- Petras Kojelavičius-Vijūkas (1622–1654), Lithuanian priest and writer
