= Aguado =

Aguado may refer to:

== People ==
Aguado is a Spanish surname. Notable people with the surname include:

- Alexandre Marie Aguado, Spanish banker
- Dionisio Aguado, Spanish classical guitarist and composer
- José Sanz Aguado, Spanish chess master
- Xavier Aguado, Spanish footballer

== Others ==
- Aguado, a Brazilian bread roll
