= Rolando Illa =

Cuban-Argentine chess player (1880–1937)

Rolando Illa (6 September 1880, New York City – 3 May 1937, Buenos Aires) was a Cuban–Argentine chess master.

Born in New York into a Cuban family, he moved to Argentina and was naturalized in 1904. He was a co-founder of the Club Argentino de Ajedrez in Buenos Aires. In 1910, he won Club Argentino Championship, and again in the period 1912–1919 (posteriormente) or 1913–1921. He won a match against Julio Lynch (3.5 : 1.5), and lost a match to Boris Kostić (0 : 6), both in Buenos Aires in 1913.

He shared 1st with C.M. Portela at Buenos Aires 1917, took 2nd, behind L. Carranza, at Buenos Aires 1920, tied for 2nd-4th at Montevideo (Carrasco) 1921/22 (South American Championship, Roberto Grau won), and took 5th at Buenos Aires 1922 (Pentagonal, Benito Villegas won). He thrice participated in the Argentine Championship: took 5th in 1921/22 (Damian Reca won), tied for 6-7th in 1923/24 and tied for 7-9th in 1924. Illa shared 2nd with Villegas, behind Alexander Alekhine, at Buenos Aires 1926.
