= Stefan Izbinsky =

Ukrainian chess player

Stefan Konstantinovich Izbinsky (Izbinski, Isbinski) (17 July 1884, Kyiv – 28 April 1912, Kyiv) was a Ukrainian chess master.

He tied for 9-10th in the Kiev 1903 chess tournament (the 3rd All-Russian masters' Tournament, Mikhail Chigorin won), tied for 8-10th at St. Petersburg 1905/06 (the 4th All-Russian Masters' Tournament, Gersz Salwe won), took 13th at St. Petersburg 1909 (All-Russian Amateur Tournament, Alexander Alekhine won), shared 3rd with Paul List at Odessa 1910 (Boris Verlinsky won), shared 1st with Efim Bogoljubow and lost a play-off match against him (+0 –2 =0) at Kiev 1911, and took 2nd, behind Fedor Bogatyrchuk, at Kiev 1911.
