= 1920 USSR Chess Championship =

Soviet chess tournament

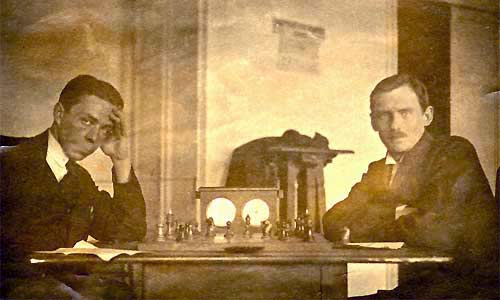
- Alekhine and Romanovsky
- Location: Moscow

Champion
- Alexander Alekhine

The 1920 USSR Chess Championship was the first edition of the USSR Chess Championship, held from 4–24 October in Moscow. The tournament was won by future world chess champion Alexander Alekhine.

== Table and results ==
1920 USSR Chess Championship
		1	2	3	4	5	6	7	8	9	10	11	12	13	14	15	16	Total
1	(Soviet Union) Alexander Alekhine	-	½	½	1	1	1	1	½	½	½	½	1	1	1	1	1	12
2	(Soviet Union) Peter Romanovsky	½	-	1	0	½	1	1	0	1	1	1	0	1	1	1	1	11
3	(Soviet Union) Grigory Levenfish	½	0	-	0	1	½	1	½	1	½	1	1	½	1	½	1	10
4	(Soviet Union) Ilya Rabinovich	0	1	1	-	0	0	0	½	½	1	1	1	1	½	1	1	9½
5	(Soviet Union) Nikolai Grigoriev	0	½	0	1	-	1	1	0	0	0	0	1	1	1	1	1	8½
6	(Soviet Union) Abram Rabinovich	0	0	½	1	0	-	1	½	1	½	0	1	0	1	1	1	8½
7	(Soviet Union) Arvid Kubbel	0	0	0	1	0	0	-	½	1	½	½	1	1	1	1	1	8½
8	(Soviet Union) Benjamin Blumenfeld	½	1	½	½	1	½	½	-	0	½	0	1	0	1	½	½	8
9	(Soviet Union) Alexander Ilyin-Genevsky	½	0	0	½	1	0	0	1	-	1	0	½	1	0	½	1	7
10	(Poland) Dawid Daniuszewski	½	0	½	0	1	½	½	½	0	-	½	½	0	1	½	1	7
11	(Soviet Union) Nikolai Zubarev	½	0	0	0	1	1	½	1	1	½	-	0	0	0	1	0	6½
12	(Soviet Union) Nikolay Pavlov-Pianov	0	1	0	0	0	0	0	0	½	½	1	-	1	½	1	1	6½
13	(Soviet Union) Nikolay Tselikov	0	0	½	0	0	1	0	1	0	1	1	0	-	0	0	1	5½
14	(Soviet Union) August Mundt	0	0	0	½	0	0	0	0	1	0	1	½	1	-	½	0	4½
15	(Soviet Union) D. Pavlov	0	0	½	0	0	0	0	½	½	½	0	0	1	½	-	½	4
16	(Soviet Union) I. Golubev	0	0	0	0	0	0	0	½	0	0	1	0	0	1	½	-	3
