= José Gerschman =

Argentine chess player

José Gerschman (born October 11, 1916 in San Salvador, Entre Rios, died 1998) was an Argentine chess master. He played four times in Argentine Chess Championship (Torneo Mayor). He took 15th in 1937 (Jacobo Bolbochán won), took 19th in 1938 (Roberto Grau won), tied for 2nd-4th in 1939 (Juan Traian Iliesco won) and took last place in a play-off triangular tournament for the title (Carlos Maderna won), and took 13th in 1940 (Carlos Guimard won). Gerschman also tied for 9-10th in the Buenos Aires 1939 chess tournament (Círculo, Paul Keres and Miguel Najdorf won), and took 7th at Buenos Aires 1963 (YMCA, Oscar Panno won).
