= Nikolay Pavlov-Pianov =

Russian chess master

Nikolay (Nikolai) M. Pavlov-Pianov (Pjanov, Pyanov) (Russian: Николай Павлов-Пьянов) was a Russian chess master.

== Chess career ==
Before World War I, he tied for 5–6th place at Moscow 1911 (Ossip Bernstein won), and shared 1st prize with Alexey Selezniev at Moscow 1913.

After the October Revolution, he finished 3rd in Moscow City Chess Championship in 1919/20 (Alexander Alekhine won), won at Moscow 1920, drew a mini match with Alekhine at Moscow 1920 (+1−1 =0), tied for 11–12th place at Moscow 1920 (the 1st USSR Chess Championship, Alekhine won), took 2nd position, behind Nikolai Grigoriev, at Moscow 1921, tied for 12–13th at Moscow 1925 (Sergeev won), tied for 15–16th at Moscow 1926 (Abram Rabinovich won), shared 2nd, behind Zubarev, at Moscow 1927, shared 10th at Moscow 1927 (the 5th USSR-ch, Fedor Bogatyrchuk and Peter Romanovsky won), and finished 9th at Odessa 1929 (the 6th USSR-ch, quarter final).
