= Annelise Rüegg =

Swiss communist activist (1879–1934)

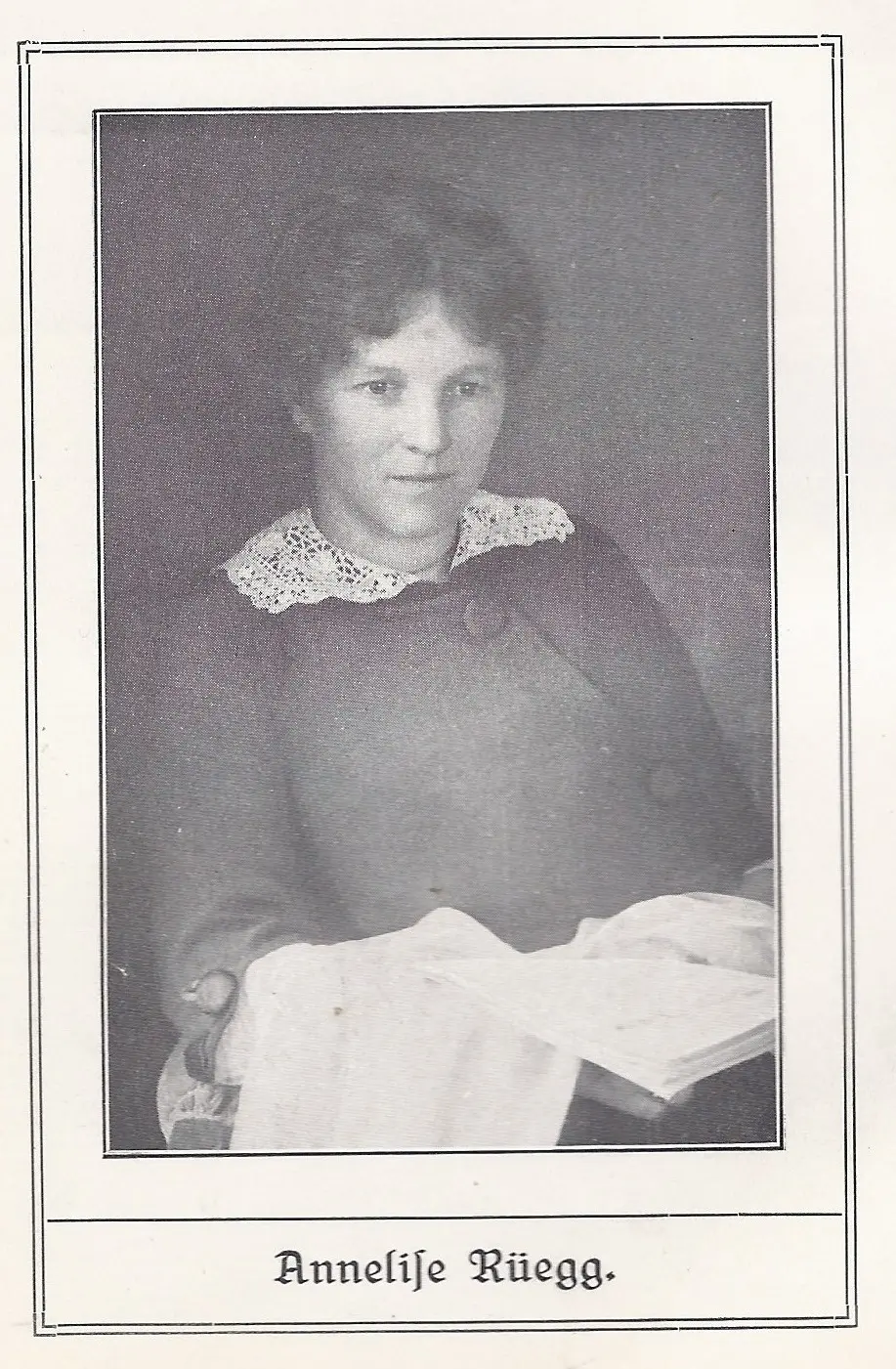
Annelise Rüegg

Annelise Rüegg (1879–1934) was a working-class Swiss communist, pacifist, women's rights activist and writer. She travelled widely, lecturing in Russia, Australia and the United States. She is remembered for two autobiographical publications: Erlebnisse einer Serviertochter (A Waitress's Experiences, 1914) and Im Kriege durch die Welt (Through the World in Wartime, 1918).

== Early life and family ==
Born into a working-class family in Uster on 9 April 1879, Annelise Rüegg was the daughter of the machinist Heinrich Rüegg and his wife Maria née Kägi. In 1921, she married the Russian chess champion Alexander Alekhine. Together they had a son, Alexander, born on 2 November 1921 after Annelise Rüegg had returned to Switzerland. The marriage was dissolved in 1926.

== Career ==
After her father's early death, when she was 14 Rüegg had to contribute to the family's income by working in a factory and taking on other odd jobs. At 16, she started to work as a waitress until a year later the Canton of Zürich restricted employment of waitresses to women who were at least 20 years of age. Thereafter she worked as a house maid in French-speaking Switzerland and later as a waitress in Lugano, Liverpool, San Remo and Baden-Baden. In 1910, now 20, while working in Zürich's luxury hotel Baur au Lac she was attracted by social democracy but when she attempted to interest her colleagues in the cause, she was fired. In 1911 and 1913, she worked in Oran, Algeria.

From the income she received from her successful Erlebnisse einer Serviertochter published in 1914, she was able to travel to Colombo in Ceylon and to Australia before returning to Switzerland in 1915 during World War I. After her biographical Weitere Erlebnisse was published in 1916 and Im Kriege durch die Welt in 1918, in 1920 she was able to travel to the Soviet Union where she met Lenin but the trip put an end to her political ambitions. While in Russia that she met and married the chess player Alexander Alekhine. In 1926, she attempted to make a lecture tour of the United States but was not admitted as she was unable to cover the cost of the required bond.

Annelise Rüegg died in Lausanne on 2 May 1934.
