= Grace Alekhine =

American painter and chess player (1876–1956)

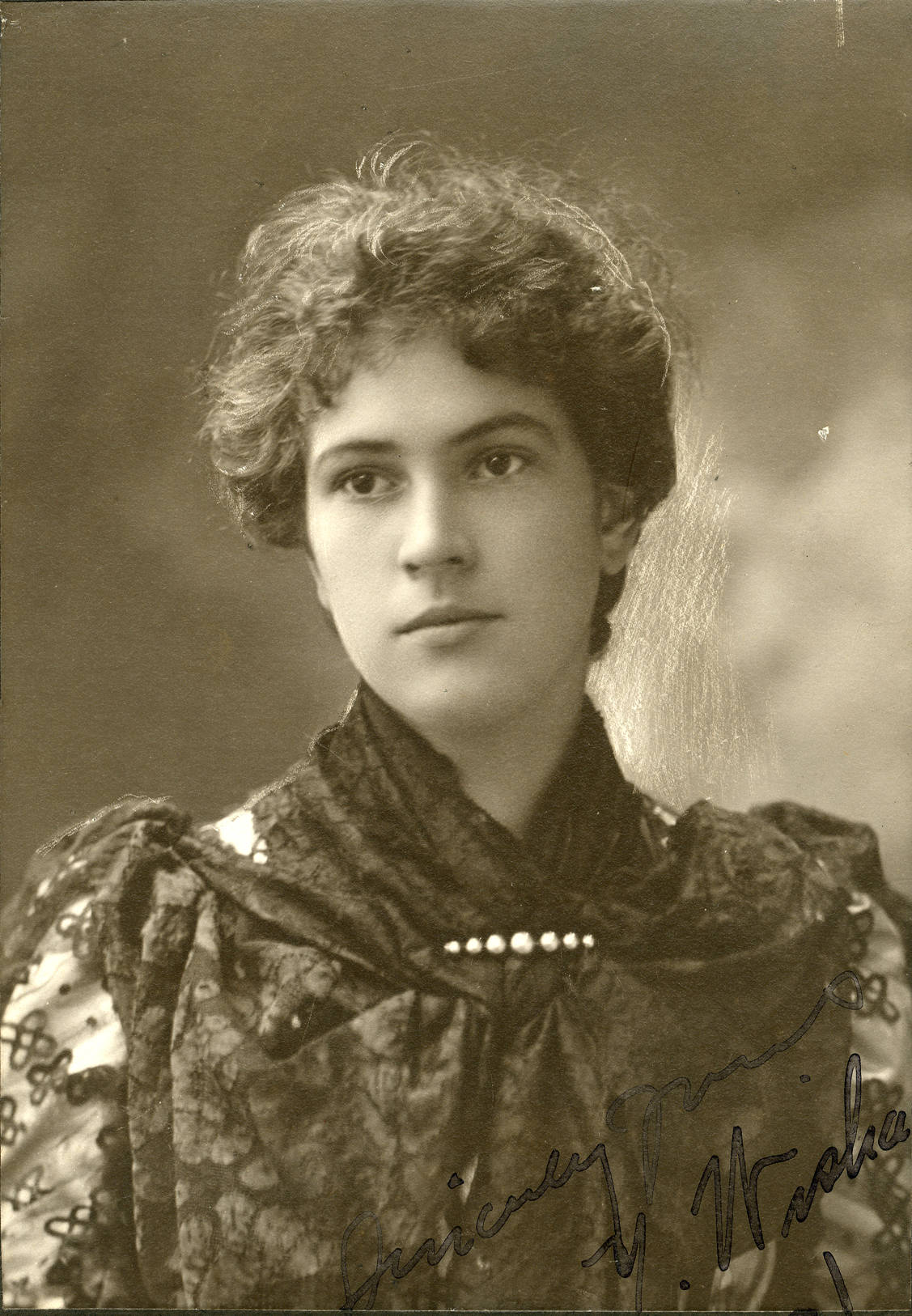
- Alekhine in 1901

Personal information
- Born: Grace Norton Wishaar; October 26, 1876 Beverly, New Jersey, U.S.
- Died: February 21, 1956 (aged 79) Neuilly-sur-Seine, France
- Spouses: Whitney Irving Eisler (m. 1897, divorced) Oscar Graham Peeke (m. 1902, divorced) Archibald C. Freeman (died 1931) Henry James Bromley Alexander Alekhine (m. 1934; died 1946)

Chess career
- Country: United States

Grace Norton Alekhine (born Grace Norton Wishaar; (Note: Other spellings include: Wishar, Wishard, Wishart.) 26 October 1876 – 21 February 1956) was an American, British, and French artist and chess master. She was the fourth and last wife of chess champion Alexander Alekhine, who was her fifth husband.

== Biography ==
=== Early life ===
Grace Norton Wishaar was born in 1876 in Beverly, New Jersey. Her parents were Émile Bernard Wishaar (born Weishaar in Paris, 1842, died in Richmond, Washington on 8 September 1918) and Marie Ida Smith. The family moved to San Jose, California and then to Seattle, Washington. She received training at the New York School of Art under William Chase, and began her career in painting there.

She married Whitney Irving Eisler in Seattle, Washington on 13 September 1897; the next year her son was born there. He was known as Carroll Earl Beauchamp Peeke (1898–1991) throughout his life. She married Oscar Graham Peeke in Seattle, Washington on 5 March 1902.

=== Career as an artist ===
She moved to Oakland, California, in 1903, and again as Grace Wishaar, she established a career as a visual artist. Her work became known on both a large and small scale: first as a miniature portraitist (with no less a client than author Jack London, for whom she painted his young daughters) and then as a theatrical scenery painter (in San Francisco's Majestic Theatre, and Oakland's Ye Liberty Playhouse and San Jose). Of her stage work, it was reported:

One of the bright women in Mr. Harry Bishop's employ is Miss Grace Wishaar, whose picture we publish on this page. Miss Wishaar is interesting from many points, but she is distinctively interesting from the fact that she is the only woman scenic artist.

She began her work at the Herald Square Theatre, New York. That is, she was grudgingly allowed to make a trial there, after showing a persistence that no amount of rebuff could discourage. It was not long, however, until she won the respect of the men with whom she worked, for she never took advantage of her womanhood to shirk any part of her duty. Indeed, these men soon learned to refer to her finer, womanly understanding in the preparation of home scenes, and her settings for the various Bishop productions are particularly remarked for their dainty finish in their decorations of such scenes.

By the spring of 1914, she was exhibiting her portraiture work at the Spring Salon des Beaux Arts in Paris: this also seems to be the year that marked her departure from the United States.

She later married Archibald C. Freeman in Ceylon, a dual British-American citizen (he committed suicide in Bandarawella in March 1931), and she retained the British citizenship obtained through him to the end of her life. She also married and divorced Henry James Bromley, according to her French marriage certificate to Alexandre Alekhine.

=== Life with Alekhine ===
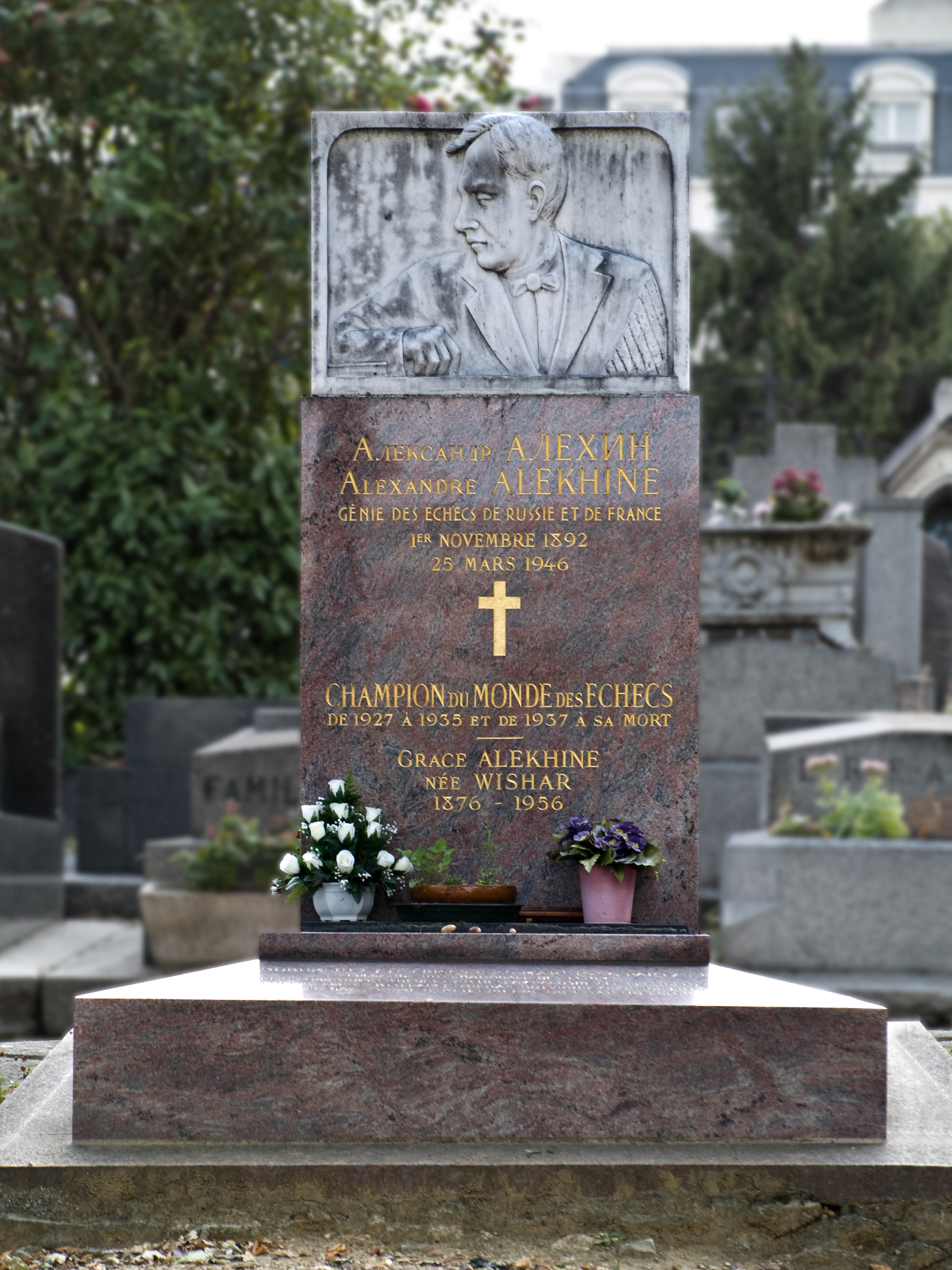
Grave of Grace Alekhine and her husband Alexander Alekhine at Montparnasse Cemetery in Paris, France

Grace, the widow of Freeman, had won a minor chess tournament in Tokyo, and played Alexander Alekhine in a simultaneous exhibition at Tokyo 1933. Her prize was one of Alekhine's books. She asked him to sign the book and their relationship developed from that moment. They were married on 26 March 1934 at Villefranche-sur-Mer, near Nice, France. She was 16 years older than her husband and wealthy, with a magnificent chateau called La Chatellenie Saint-Aubin-le-Cauf, a few miles southwest of Dieppe in Normandy, and an art studio in Paris. In 1935, she finished outside the top four in the French Championship (Paulette Schwartzmann won) in Paris. In April 1936, she with her husband came to Sofia (Alekhine's Simultaneous Exhibition). Both competed at Hastings in 1936/7 when he won the Premier and she won 3rd prize in the 3rd Class Morning A. They both came to Plymouth in 1938 for the Golden Jubilee Congress, where they attended a civic reception in their honour. During World War II, the Nazis took over their chateau and looted it. She moved to Paris. Alekhine was free to travel, but no exit visa was given to Grace. He was effectively exiled to Portugal while Grace elected to remain in France to monitor the welfare of her various properties at the mercy of the invaders. She even found time to compete in the Paris Championship of 1944 when she became the Ladies Champion. After World War II, she sold her chateau under American Embassy protection. She spent her final years in her studio in Paris, but visited St. Ives, Cornwall, where she was a member of the local chess club. In the early 1950s, she was visited in Paris by her granddaughter Roberta Peeke: the young woman was invited to address her as "Lady Grace". She died at the American Hospital of Paris in Paris on 21 February 1956, and was buried next to Alexander in the Cimetière du Montparnasse, Paris, to where Alekhine's body had been transferred from Portugal after a long campaign she had led. Her grave misspells her maiden name as Wishar.

After her death, the notes in Alekhine's handwriting were allegedly found in 1956 in her effects to prove he wrote the six-part Pariser Zeitung article, entitled Aryan and Jewish Chess, published in March 1941 (which criticises Jewish chess strategy for being defensive and praises Aryan strategy for its aggression). Although Grace was raised in a Protestant family and her mother, Marie Ida (née Smith) Wishaar, was an Episcopalian from New York, some writers have asserted that she had Jewish ancestry (surviving the Nazi occupation of France by residing with her husband in Rio de Janeiro, Brazil). Her son was raised an Episcopalian, and it is unlikely she practiced Judaism.
