= Buenos Aires 1939 chess tournament =

Argentine chess event

The event was held in Buenos Aires, immediately after the 8th Chess Olympiad, from 2nd to 19 October 1939 at the Círculo de Ajedrez, one of the two main chess clubs in the city. Play took place at the club's long-time premises at Bartolomé Mitre 670, with rounds starting at 20.30 hours in the evening. All participants, except of Paul Keres, had decided to stay in Argentina due to outbreak of World War II.

The results and standings:

Buenos Aires (Circulo) 1939
#	Player	Country	1	2	3	4	5	6	7	8	9	10	11	12	Total
1-2	Miguel Najdorf	Poland	x	1	½	1	½	½	1	0	1	1	1	1	8.5
1-2	Paul Keres	Estonia	0	x	½	1	½	1	½	1	1	1	1	1	8.5
3-4	Gideon Ståhlberg	Sweden	½	½	x	0	1	1	½	½	½	1	½	1	7
3-4	Moshe Czerniak	Palestine	0	0	1	x	½	1	½	1	1	1	1	0	7
5-6	Paulino Frydman	Poland	½	½	0	½	x	½	½	0	1	1	1	1	6.5
5-6	Carlos Guimard	Argentina	½	0	0	0	½	x	½	1	1	1	1	1	6.5
7	Roberto Grau	Argentina	0	½	½	½	½	½	x	½	1	0	½	1	5.5
8	Markas Luckis	Lithuania	1	0	½	0	1	0	½	x	0	1	½	½	5
9-10	José Gerschman	Argentina	0	0	½	0	0	0	0	1	x	0	1	1	3.5
9-10	Francisco Benkö	Argentina	0	0	0	0	0	0	1	0	1	x	1	½	3.5
11	Sonja Graf	Germany	0	0	½	0	0	0	½	½	0	0	x	1	2.5
12	Luis Argentino Palau	Argentina	0	0	0	1	0	0	0	½	0	½	0	x	2
