= Buenos Aires Club Argentino Chess Championship =

Club Argentino de Ajedrez was founded on April 17, 1905, in Buenos Aires.

== Winners ==
Year	Winner
1906–1907	Benito Villegas
1908	Julio Lynch
1909	Alejandro Mom
1910	Rolando Illa
1911	Julio Lynch
1912–1919	Rolando Illa
1920–1921	Julio Lynch
1922	Carlos Portela
1923	Enrique Ibañez
1924	Julio Lynch
1925–1928	Carlos Portela
1929–1930	Julio Lynch
1931–1948	Aaron Schvartzman
1949–1951	Enrique Reinhardt
1952	Luis Piazzini
1953	Oscar Panno
1954	Leonardo Lipiniks
1955	Enrique Reinhardt
1956–1957	Raúl Sanguinetti
1958–1962	Alfredo Esposito
1963–1964	Ruben Rollansky
1965–1992	Oscar Panno
1993	Humberto Borghi
1994	Javier Moreno
1995–2006	Hugo Spangenberg
2007	Sandro Mareco
