= Ramón Rey Ardid =

Spanish chess player (1903–1988)

Ramón Rey Ardid (20 December 1903, Zaragoza – 21 January 1988) was a Spanish chess master. He was Spanish champion from 1929 to 1942.

He was a psychiatrist and professor at the Zaragoza University. In 1924, he played for Spain in first unofficial Chess Olympiad in Paris (+4 –5 =4) where took team 10th place and shared 21st in Consolation Cup (B tournament, Karel Hromádka won). In 1928, he won the pre-Olympic tournament in Madrid, but later resigned from participation in the 2nd Olympiad at The Hague.

In 1929, he tied for 4-5th in Barcelona (José Raúl Capablanca won) and took his first Spanish Champion title. In 1929 he won a match for the Spanish title against Manuel Golmayo (+4 –1 =2). He defended the title, winning matches: against R. Casas (+5 –1 =0) in 1933, Vicente Almirali Castall (+5 –0 =2) in 1935, Juan Manuel Fuentes (+5 –1 =1) in 1942, and lost the title to José Sanz Aguado (+3 –4 =3) in 1943.

In tournaments and matches, he took 2nd, behind Andor Lilienthal, at Sitges 1934; won a match against Victor Kahn (+2 –0 =4) at Zaragoza 1935; shared 1st in Hastings 1935/36 (B tournament).

In 1944, Rey Ardid lost a match to Alexander Alekhine (+0 –1 =3) and won against Francisco Lupi (+5 –1 =0), both in Zaragoza. He won at Madrid 1946 (Casa de Alba).
