= Abram Rabinovich =

Russian chess player

Abram Isaakovich Rabinovich (5 January 1878 – 7 November 1943) was a Lithuanian–Russian chess player. He was champion of Moscow in 1926.

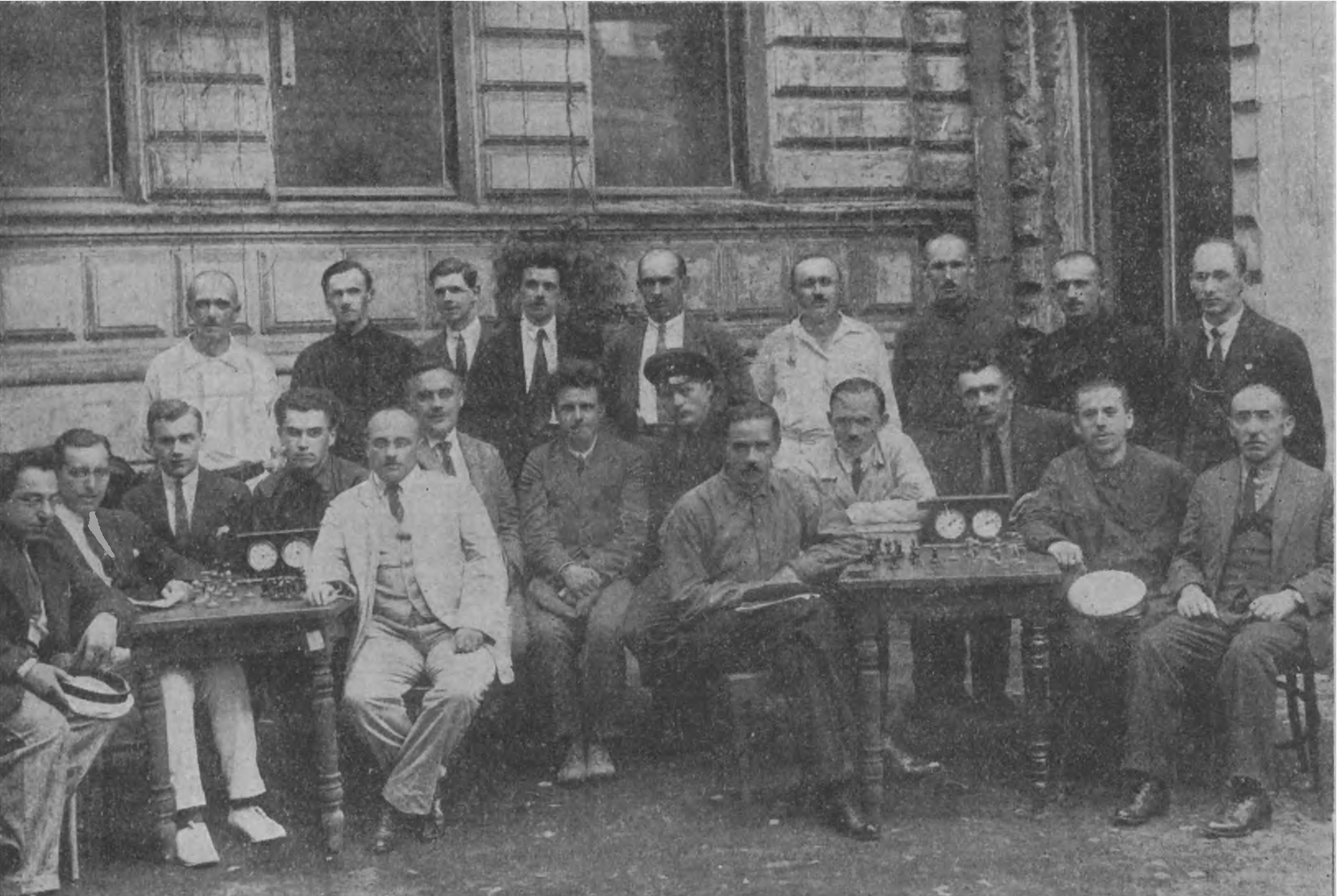
The participants of the fourth USSR Chess Championship in 1925. Sitting (left to right): Vilner, Levenfish, Rokhlin (organizer), Gotthilf, I. Rabinovich, Bogoljubow (winner), Ilyin-Genevsky, Duz-Khotimirsky, Romanovsky, Sergeyev, Nenarokov, Verlinsky, A. Rabinovich. Standing (left to right): von Freymann, Sozin, Eremeev (organizer), Grigoriev, Zubarev, Selezniev, Kaspersky, Kutuzov, Weinstein (organizer).

== Biography ==
Rabinovich was born in Vilna, Lithuania (then the Russian Empire) into a Litvak family. His parents were Itzik (Isaac) Haimovich and Leia Leibovna Rabinovich, natives of Shnipishek. In 1903, Rabinovich tied for 11-12th places in Kiev (3rd All-Russian Masters' Tournament, Mikhail Chigorin won). In 1908, he took 19th in Prague (Oldřich Duras and Carl Schlechter won). In 1909, he tied for 2nd-3rd in Vilna (6th All-Russian Masters' Tournament; Akiba Rubinstein won). In 1911, he tied for 19th-21st in Carlsbad (Richard Teichmann won). In 1912, he took 18th in Vilna (Hauptturnier, Karel Hromádka won).

During World War I, he moved to Moscow. In 1916, he tied for 4th-5th, and was 3rd in 1918. He tied for 5th-7th at the All-Russian Chess Olympiad (retroactively recognised as the first Soviet chess championship) at Moscow 1920. The event was won by Alexander Alekhine. In 1924, he finished 12th in the 3rd USSR Championship, won by Efim Bogoljubow, in Moscow. In 1925, he tied for 9th-10th places in Leningrad (4th USSR Championship; Bogoljubow won), and took 4th in the Moscow Championship, won by Aleksandr Sergeyev. In 1926, Rabinovich won the Moscow Championship. The next year, he tied for 7th-9th (Nikolai Zubarev won). Rabinovich won in Moscow in 1930 and that was his final successful result.

Rabinovich died in Moscow on 7 November 1943.

== See also ==
- List of Jewish chess players
