= Antonio Rico =

Spanish chess player (1908–1988)

Antonio Rico González (26 February 1908 – 16 December 1988) was a Spanish chess master.

He was eight times Asturian Champion (1944, 1945, 1946, 1947, 1948, 1952, 1953, and 1956).

In 1934, he tied for 5-6th in Madrid (Torneo Gromer). After the Spanish Civil War, he won at Madrid 1942 (ESP-ch, semifinal); took 4th at Gijón 1944 (1st it, Alexander Alekhine won); won in semifinal and tied for 3rd-4th in final of Spanish championship at Bilbao 1945 (Antonio Medina won).

Rico won, ahead of Medina and Alekhine, at Gijón 1945 (2nd it); took 4th at Gijón 1946 (3rd it, Francisco José Pérez won); took 9th at Gijón 1947 (4th it, Perez and Prins won); took 2nd, behind Perez, at Aviles 1947; and won, followed by Baruch Harold Wood, Perez, etc. at Gijón 1948 (5th it).
