= Francisco Lupi =

Portuguese chess player (1920–1954)

Francisco Lupi (March 6, 1920 – January 14, 1954) was a Portuguese chess master.

In January 1940, he lost a game to Alexander Alekhine in Estoril (it was a blindfold simultaneous display, Alekhine played blindfold against eight of the best Portuguese players). In February 1940, he drew a game with Alekhine in Estoril (simultaneous display). Lupi was a noted Portuguese player during World War II. During the forties and early fifties, he played tournaments and many simultaneous exhibitions in Spain. In Spring 1945, he lost a match against Ramón Rey Ardid (+1 –5 =0) in Zaragoza (Saragossa). He took part in the International Chess Tournament of Gijon -1945 and 1946-; Lupi had lost his game with Alekhine. In August 1945, he tied for 3rd-4th in Sabadell (Alekhine won); Lupi had lost his game with Alekhine. In Autumn 1945, he won, ahead of Alekhine, in Cáceres (Lupi beat Alekhine). In January 1946, he lost a match to Alekhine (+1 –2 =1) in Estoril, Portugal. This was Alekhine's very last competition.

In 1946, he finished last at the London B–Tournament, scoring 2.5/11 (+1 =3 -7); Max Euwe won. In 1951, he played in Madrid (Pablo Morán won). Lupi died in Madrid in January 1954.
