= Benito Villegas =

Argentine chess player (1877–1952)

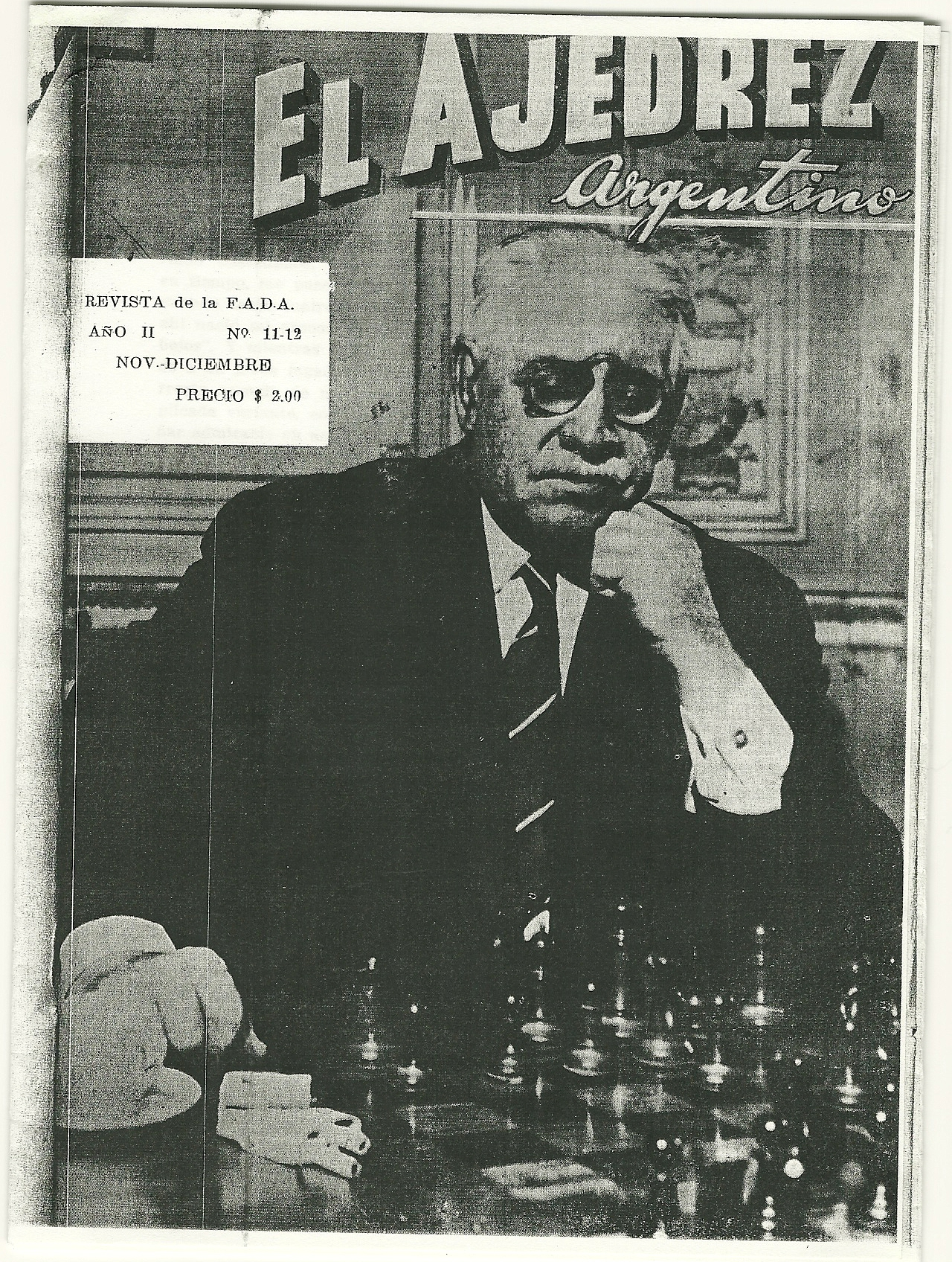
Villegas in 1948

Benito Higinio Villegas (11 January 1877 – 27 April 1952) was an Argentine chess master.

He was the first Champion of Club Argentino de Ajedrez in Buenos Aires in 1906–1907. After World War I, he won Argentine Chess Championship in 1922, and was Sub-Champion in 1921 and 1923.

Villegas participated in several South American Chess Championships. He tied for 2nd-4th at Montevideo 1921/22 (Carrasco, Roberto Grau won); shared 6th at Montevideo 1925 (Luis Argentino Palau won); took 7th at Mar del Plata 1928 (Grau won); took 11th at Buenos Aires 1931 (Geniol it, Carlos Maderna won); took 10th at Mar del Plata 1934 (Aaron Schwartzman won); tied for 11-12th at Buenos Aires 1934/35 (Luis Piazzini won), and tied for 13-14th at Mar del Plata 1936 (Isaías Pleci won).

During World War II, he played in Mar del Plata international tournaments, and shared 8th in 1942 (Miguel Najdorf won), took 14th in 1943 (Gideon Ståhlberg won), and took 16th in 1944 (Hermann Pilnik and Najdorf won). In 1944, he also took 17th at La Plata (Najdorf won).
