= José Sanz Aguado =

Spanish chess player

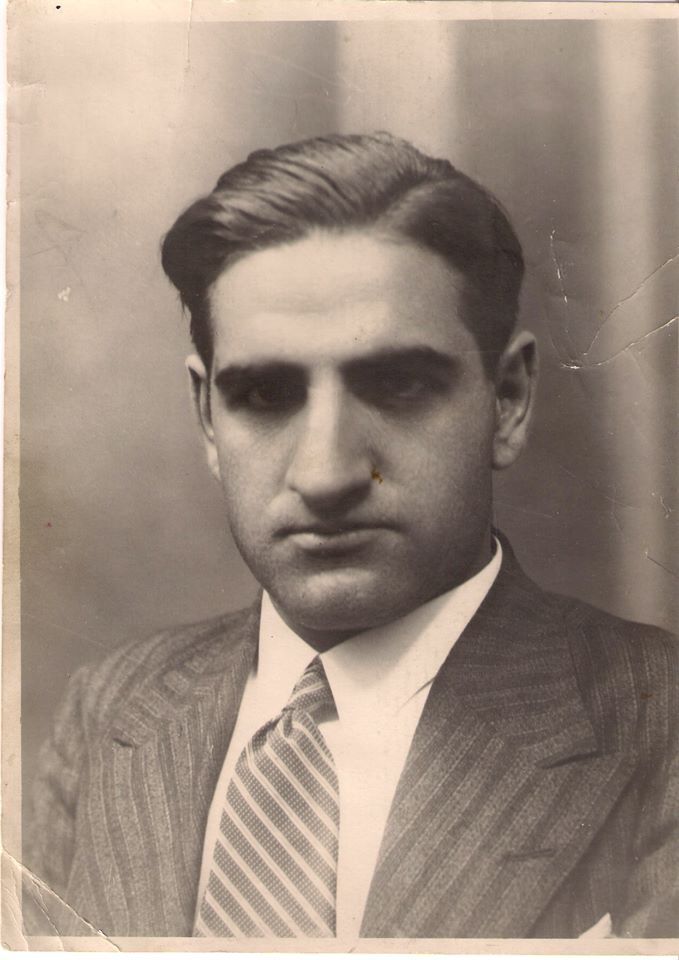

Personal information
- Born: 20 November 1907 Martorell, Spain
- Died: 14 December 1969 (aged 62) Madrid, Spain

Chess career
- Country: Spain

José Sanz Aguado (20 November 1907 – 14 December 1969) was a Spanish chess player and Spanish Chess Championship winner (1943).

== Biography ==
In the 1930s José Sanz Aguado was one of the strongest chess players in Spain.

José Sanz Aguado played for Spain in the Chess Olympiad:

- In 1931, at reserve board in the 4th Chess Olympiad in Prague (+3, =1, -11).

He fought in the Spanish Civil War and lost his leg in battle. After the war he was forced to move to France but later returned to his homeland. In 1943, José Sanz Aguado won the Spanish Chess Championship after victory in his match against Ramón Rey Ardid - 5½:4½ (+4, =3, -3). José Sanz Aguado participated in several international tournaments and two radio matches with Argentina (1946, 1948). He participated in the International Tournament of Gijón in 1946 and 1949; achieving the ninth and tenth ranks respectively.

José Sanz Aguado was also known as a chess journalist. He was the founder and first editor of the magazine El ajedrez español. From 1934 to 1936 twenty three issues came out, after which the magazine was closed. José Sanz Aguado revived the magazine in 1955.

He released two chess books:

- Campeonatos de España de ajedrez, 1944-1945, editorial Dossat, Madrid, año 1945.
- Morphy, la estrella fugaz, editorial Ricardo Aguilera, Madrid, año 1957.

== Notable game ==
Martín Ortueta — José Sanz Aguado,

Madrid, 1933

Position: g1 white king, g2 white pawn, d2 black rook, b2 white pawn, a2 white pawn, h3 white pawn, c4 black pawn, a4 white knight, g5 black pawn, c5 black pawn, e6 black pawn, b6 black bishop, h7 black king, g7 black pawn, b7 white rook, a7 black pawn

Position after 31. Na4.

José Sanz Aguado was widely known for his spectacular combination in a game against Martín Ortueta, played in 1933.

Martín Ortueta — José Sanz Aguado, Madrid, 1933

1. e4 e6 2. d3 d5 3. Nc3 Nf6 4. e5 Nfd7 5. f4 Bb4 6. Bd2 0–0 7. Nf3 f6 8. d4 c5 9. Nb5 fe 10. de Rxf4 11. c3 Re4+ 12. Be2 Ba5 13. 0–0 Nxe5 14. Nxe5 Rxe5 15. Bf4 Rf5 16. Bd3 Rf6 17. Qc2 h6 18. Ne5 Nd7 19. Bxf6 Nxf6 20. Bxf6 Qxf6 21. Rf1 Qe7 22. Bh7+ Kh8 23. Qg6 Bd7 24. Rf7 Qg5 25. Qxg5 hg 26. Rxd7 Kxh7 27. Rxb7 Bb6 28. c4 dc 29. Nc3 Rd8 30. h3 Rd2 31. Na4 (look diagram).

31... Rxb2!! 32. Nxb2 c3 33. Rxb6 c4!! 34. Rb4 a5!! 35. Nxc4 c2. White resigns.
