= Alexei Alekhine =

Russian chess player

Personal information
- Born: August 1888
- Died: August 1939 (aged 50–51) Kharkov, Ukrainian SSR, Soviet Union

Chess career
- Country: Russia

Alexei (Alexey) Alekhine (Russian: Алексе́й Алекса́ндрович Але́хин, Alekséy Aleksándrovich Alékhin, 1888–1939) was a Russian chess master and the older (by four years) brother of World Chess Champion Alexander Alekhine.

His father was a wealthy landowner, a Marshal of the Nobility and a member of the State Duma, and his mother was an heiress to an industrial fortune. Both he and his younger brother Alexander were taught chess by their mother.

Alexei drew with Harry Nelson Pillsbury when the American master gave a simultaneous blindfold display in Moscow in 1902. He tied for fourth in the Moscow Chess Club Autumn tournament in 1907, while Alexander tied for eleventh. Alexei finished third at Moscow 1913 (Oldřich Duras won), and tied for third at Moscow 1915. He was an editor of the chess journal "Shakhmatny Vyestnik" from 1913 to 1916.

After the October Revolution, he won (elimination – third group) and took third place in the tournament for amateurs in Moscow, held in October 1920, while his brother Alexander won the first USSR Chess Championship (All-Russian Chess Olympiad) there.

He took third place at Petrograd (now Saint Petersburg) 1923, took 12th at Moscow 1924, tied for fourth-fifth at Kharkov 1925 (the second Ukrainian Chess Championship, Yakov Vilner won), took 11th at Odessa 1926 (Ukrainian championship, Boris Verlinsky and Marsky won), and took 8th at Poltava 1927 (Ukrainian championship, won by Alexey Selezniev).

Alexei died in Kharkov in August 1939, at age 51.
