= Alexander Ilyin-Genevsky =

Soviet chess player (1894–1941)

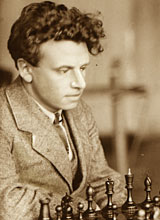
Alexander Ilyin-Zhenevsky

Alexander Fyodorovich Ilyin (Russian: Алекса́ндр Фёдорович Ильи́н-Жене́вский; 28 November 1894 – 3 September 1941), known by his party name Zhenevsky ('the Genevan'), because he joined the Bolshevik group of Russian émigrés while exiled in that city, was a Soviet chess master and organiser, one of the founders of the Soviet chess school, an Old-Guard Bolshevik cadre, a writer, a military organiser, a historian, and a diplomat. He was born in Saint Petersburg and was the younger brother of Red Navy leader Fedor Raskolnikov.

== Chess career ==
Ilyin-Zhenevsky promoted chess as an educational vehicle for developing tactical and strategic comprehension during military training, and, within the Soviet Union, he was the main person responsible for spreading the idea of chess as a way to teach the basics of scientific and rational thought. The All-Russian Chess Olympiad (retroactively recognised as the first Soviet Championship) in 1920, and the 1933 match between Mikhail Botvinnik and Salo Flohr, were organised by him. He was three times chess champion of Leningrad, in 1925 (jointly), 1926, and 1929. In 1925, he won a game against José Raúl Capablanca, one of only a few players ever to have beaten Capablanca in a tournament game.

Having been personally associated with many oppositionists since the Civil War, he suffered persecution in the Joseph Stalin era. According to Botvinnik and official sources, he died in a Nazi air raid on Lake Ladoga, while on board a ship during the siege of Leningrad. However, some believe that he fell victim to the Great Purge, although this claim is highly dubious, because in 1941, after the Purge had ended, Ilyin-Zhenevsky was playing in the Rostov-on-Don semifinal for the 13th Soviet Championship on the day Germany invaded the Soviet Union.

Since 1988, the annual A. F. Ilyin-Zhenevsky Memorial has been held in the town of Novaya Ladoga.

== Legacy ==
A variation of the Dutch Defence, characterized by the moves 1.d4 f5 2.c4 Nf6 3.g3 e6 4.Bg2 Be7 5.Nf3 0-0 6.0-0 d6 7.Nc3, is named after him.

Now Black has three possible continuations peculiar for this system: 7...a5; 7...Qe8; 7...Ne4.

== Political works ==
- From February to the Conquest of Power
- The Bolsheviks in Power – Reminiscences of the Year 1918, New Park, ISBN 0-86151-011-9
