= Carlos Guimard =

Argentine chess grandmaster (1913–1998)

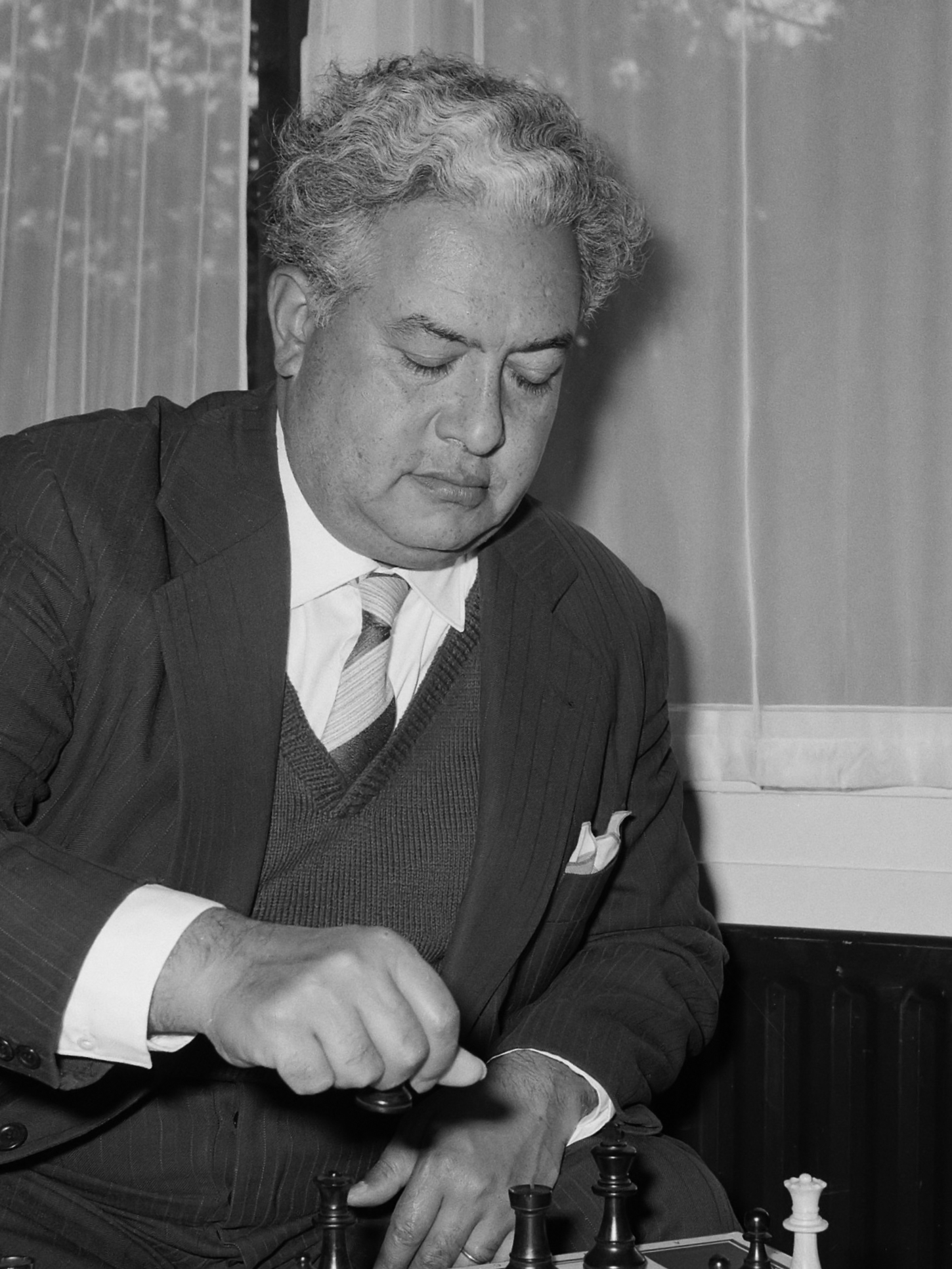
- Carlos Guimard in 1961

Personal information
- Born: Carlos Enrique Guimard; 6 April 1913 Santiago del Estero, Argentina
- Died: 11 September 1998 (aged 85) Buenos Aires, Argentina

Chess career
- Country: Argentina
- Title: Grandmaster (1960)
- Peak rating: 2410 (July 1971)

Carlos Enrique Guimard (6 April 1913 – 11 September 1998) was an Argentine chess Grandmaster. He was born in Santiago del Estero. His granddaughter Isabel Leonard is a mezzo-soprano.

== Biography ==
Guimard was thrice Argentine Champion. In 1936, he won the Mayor tournament, and in 1937 a match for the title against the champion, Roberto Grau (+4 –0 =4). In 1937, he won a match against his challenger, Luis Piazzini (+7 –2 =1). In 1940, he won the Mayor tournament, and in 1941 a match against the champion, Carlos Maderna (+7 –0 =2).

In tournaments, he tied for 3rd–5th at Mar del Plata 1934 (2nd it; Aaron Schwartzman won), took 5th at Mar del Plata 1936 (3rd it; Isaías Pleci won), tied for 1st with Ludwig Rellstab at Berlin 1937, took 2nd, behind Grau, at Buenos Aires 1938 (ARG-ch), took 2nd, behind Alexander Alekhine, in the Montevideo 1938 chess tournament, tied for 1st–3rd with Virgilio Fenoglio and Julio Bolbochán at Rio de Janeiro 1938, and tied for 5th–6th with Paulino Frydman in the Buenos Aires 1939 chess tournament. The event was won by Miguel Najdorf and Paul Keres.

In 1940, he won in Santiago. In 1940, he took 3rd, behind Aristide Gromer and Franciszek Sulik, in Buenos Aires (Bodas de Plata). In 1941, he tied for 6–8th in the Mar del Plata 1941 chess tournament (4th it; Gideon Ståhlberg won). In 1941, he took 5th in Buenos Aires (Najdorf and Stahlberg won). In 1941, he tied for 1st with Erich Eliskases, in Águas de São Pedro. In 1942, he lost a match to Héctor Rossetto 5 : 8 (ARG-ch). In 1944, lost a match to Juan Iliesco 2 : 6 (ARG-ch). In 1944, he tied for 3rd–4th with Pablo Michel, behind Hermann Pilnik and Najdorf, in Mar del Plata (7th it). In 1945, he tied for 2nd–3rd with Stahlberg, behind Najdorf, in Buenos Aires. In 1945, he won in Vigna del Mare.

After World War II, Guimard tied for 3rd–4th at Barcelona 1946 (Najdorf won). In 1946, he took 15th in Groningen (Mikhail Botvinnik won). In 1946, he tied for 11–12th in Prague (Treybal Memorial; Najdorf won). In 1946, he took 4th in Mar del Plata (Najdorf won). In 1947, he tied for 8–11th in Mar del Plata (Najdorf won). In 1948, he took 13th in Mar del Plata (Eliskases won). In 1949, he tied for 2nd–3rd in Mar del Plata (Rossetto won). In 1949, he took 2nd, behind Julio Bolbochán, in Remedios de Escalada. In 1950, he shared second at Mar del Plata (Svetozar Gligorić won).

In 1951, he took 5th in Mar del Plata/Buenos Aires (zonale). The event was won by Eliskases and Julio Bolbochán. In 1952, he tied for 12–13th in Havana (Capablanca Memorial; Samuel Reshevsky and Najdorf won). In 1953, he tied for 10–11th in Mar del Plata (Gligorić won). In 1954, he tied for 3rd–4th in Mar del Plata (zonale; Oscar Panno won). In 1955, he tied for 12–13th in Göteborg (interzonale; David Bronstein won).

In 1960, he tied for 4–7th in Buenos Aires. In 1961, he tied for 1st–2nd in Enschede. In 1961, he tied for 4–5th in Zevenaar. In 1962, he took 10th in Havana. In 1964, he tied for 5–6th in Buenos Aires. In 1967, he tied for 5–6th in Mar del Plata (ARG-ch). In 1981, he took 8th in Santiago (Walter Browne won).

Guimard played for Argentina in four Chess Olympiads.

- In 1937, at fourth board in 7th Chess Olympiad in Stockholm (+8 –2 =6);
- In 1939, at fourth board in 8th Chess Olympiad in Buenos Aires (+9 –3 =5);
- In 1950, at third board in 9th Chess Olympiad in Dubrovnik (+4 –2 =4);
- In 1954, at fourth board in 11th Chess Olympiad in Amsterdam (+3 –1 =2).

He won individual silver medal at Stockholm 1937, and two team silver medals (1950, 1954).

In 1950, Guimard played at 2nd board against Henri Grob (+1 –0 =1) in a match Argentina–Switzerland (5,5 : 4,5) in Zurich. In March 1954, he drew his 8th board against Isaac Boleslavsky (+1 –1 =2) in a match Argentina–Soviet Union (11,5 : 20,5) in Buenos Aires.

Guimard was awarded the International Master (IM) title in 1950, and the Grandmaster (GM) title in 1960.

The opening 1.e4 e6 2.d4 d5 3.Nd2 Nc6 is named for him, the Guimard Variation of the French Defense.

== Notable chess games ==
- Carlos Enrique Guimard vs Gösta Stoltz, Stockholm 1937, 7th Olympiad, Queen’s Gambit Declined, Semi-Tarrasch Defense, D40, 1–0
- Alexander Alekhine vs Carlos Enrique Guimard, Montevideo 1938, Carrasco, Queen's Gambit Declined, D56, 1/2–1/2
- Carlos Enrique Guimard vs Carlos Hugo Maderna, Buenos Aires 1941, ARG-ch, King's Gambit Accepted, C34, 1–0
- Miguel Najdorf vs Carlos Enrique Guimard, Vigna del Mare 1945, French Defense, Classical, Burn Variation, C11, 0–1
- Svetozar Gligorić vs Carlos Enrique Guimard, Buenos Aires 1960, French Defense, Classical, Burn Variation, C11, 0–1
