= Aron Schvartzman =

Argentine chess player (1908–2013)

Aron Schvartzman (also written as Aarón Schvartzman and Aron Schwartzman) (2 December 1908 – 15 January 2013) was an Argentine chess master who was prominent in chess tournaments of the 1930s and 1940s.

Between 1933 and 1949, Schvartzman was a participant in numerous Argentine Chess Championships. In 1933, he took 3rd (ARG-ch 12 Mayor; Luis Piazzini won). In 1935, he took 3rd (ARG-ch 14 Mayor; Jacobo Bolbochán won). In 1936, he tied for 3rd-5th (ARG-ch 15 Mayor; Carlos Guimard won). In 1937, he tied for 4-6th (ARG-ch 16 Mayor; Jacobo Bolbochán again won).

He won, ahead of Roberto Grau, at Mar del Plata 1934, and took 2nd, behind Isaías Pleci at Mar del Plata 1936. In the period from 1931 to 1948, he was a champion of Club Argentino de Ajedrez in Buenos Aires.

Schvartzman retired from chess competition at the end of 1949 to pursue a profession as a physician. He had occasionally reappeared at chess events.
