= Alexander Alekhine =

Russian-French chess player (1892–1946)

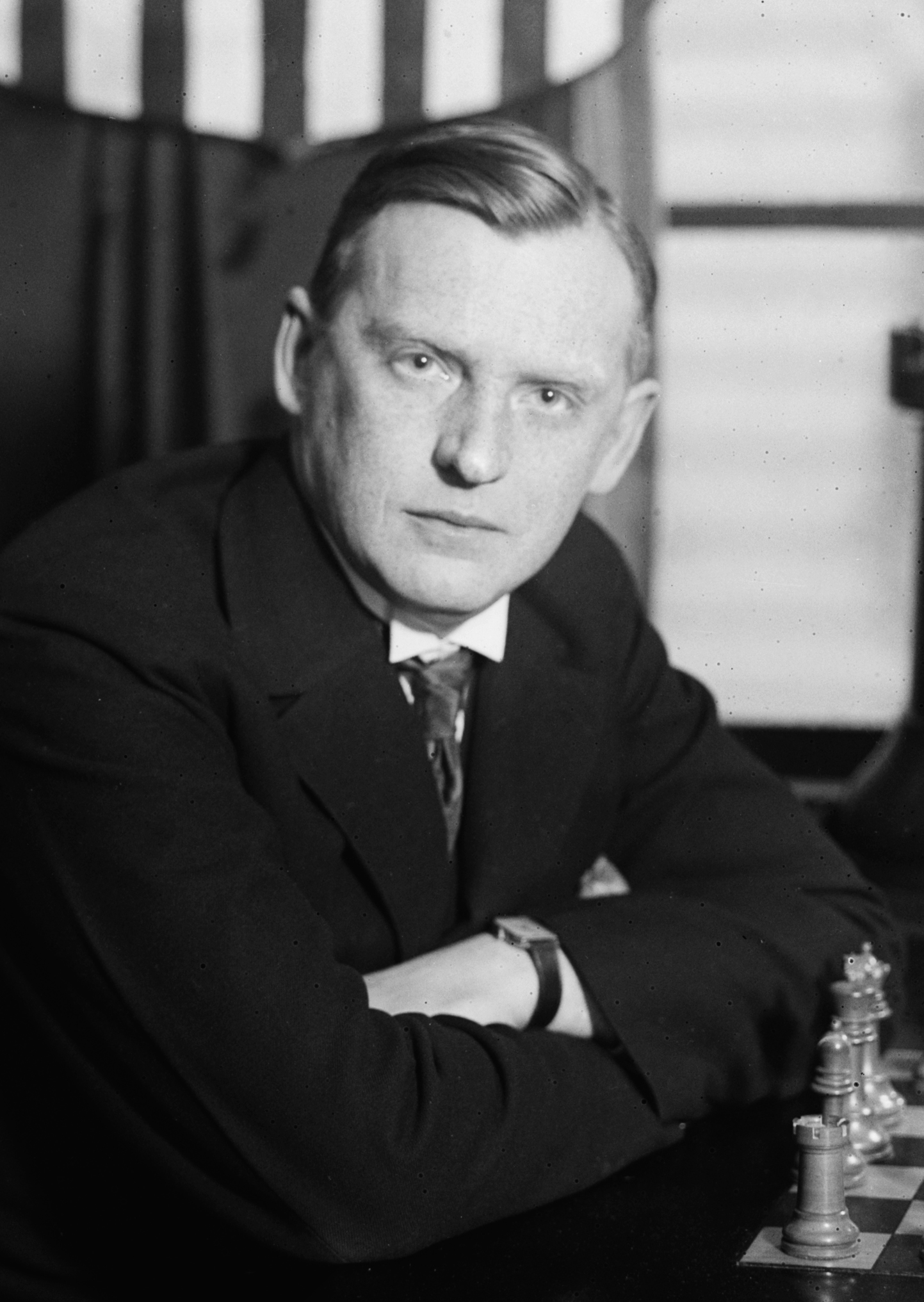
- Alekhine, c. 1924

Personal information
- Born: Alexander Alexandrovich Alekhine; October 31, 1892 Moscow, Russia
- Died: March 24, 1946 (aged 53) Estoril, Portugal
- Spouses: Alexandra Batayeva (m. 1920; div. 1921) Annelise Rüegg (m. 1921, divorced) Nadiezda Fabritzky (m. 1927, divorced) Grace Wishaar (m. 1934)

Chess career
- Country: Russian Empire → Soviet Russia (before 1921); France (after 1924)
- World Champion: 1927–1935; 1937–1946

Alexander Alexandrovich Alekhine (Note: /ˈælɪkiːn/ AL-i-keen; Russian: Александр Александрович Алехин, romanized: Aleksandr Aleksandrovich Alekhin, IPA: [ɐlʲɪkˈsandr ɐlʲɪkˈsandrəvʲɪtɕ ɐˈlʲexʲɪn]. He disliked when Russians sometimes pronounced the ⟨е⟩ ye of Алехин as ⟨ё⟩ yo, [ɐˈlʲɵxʲɪn], which he regarded as a Yiddish distortion of his name, and insisted that the correct Russian pronunciation was [ɐˈlʲexʲɪn].) (Note: Official name as a French citizen: Alexandre Alekhine. In English his surname would normally be transliterated as "Alekhin", but when he became a French citizen, the standard French transliteration "Alekhine" became the usual way to spell his name in the Latin alphabet.) (31 October [O.S. 19 October] 1892 – March 24, 1946) was a Russian and French chess player and the fourth World Chess Champion, a title he held for two reigns.

By the age of 22, Alekhine was already among the strongest chess players in the world. During the 1920s, he won most of the tournaments in which he played. In 1921, Alekhine left Soviet Russia and emigrated to France, which he represented after 1925. In 1927, he became the fourth World Chess Champion by defeating José Raúl Capablanca.

In the early 1930s, Alekhine dominated tournament play and won two top-class tournaments by large margins. He also played first board for France in five Chess Olympiads, winning individual prizes in each (four medals and a brilliancy prize). Alekhine offered Capablanca a rematch on the same demanding terms that Capablanca had set for him, and negotiations dragged on for years without making much progress. Meanwhile, Alekhine defended his title with ease against Efim Bogoljubov in 1929 and 1934. He was defeated by Max Euwe in 1935, but regained his crown in the 1937 rematch. His tournament record, however, was uneven, and rising young stars like Paul Keres, Reuben Fine, and Mikhail Botvinnik threatened his title. Negotiations for a title match with Keres or Botvinnik were halted by the outbreak of World War II in Europe in 1939. Negotiations with Botvinnik for a world title match were proceeding in 1946 when Alekhine died in Portugal, in unclear circumstances. Alekhine is the only World Chess Champion to have died while holding the title.

Alekhine is known for his fierce and imaginative attacking style, combined with great positional and endgame skill. He is highly regarded as a chess writer and theoretician, having produced innovations in a wide range of chess openings and having given his name to Alekhine's Defence and several other opening variations. He also composed some endgame studies.

== Biography ==
=== Early life ===
Alekhine was born into a wealthy Russian family in Moscow, Russia, on October 31, 1892. His father, Alexander Ivanovich Alekhin, was a landowner and Privy Councilor to the conservative legislative Fourth Duma. His mother, Anisya Ivanovna Alekhina (born Prokhorova), was the daughter of a rich industrialist. Alekhine was introduced to chess by his mother, his older brother Alexei, and his older sister Varvara.

=== Early chess career (1902–1914) ===
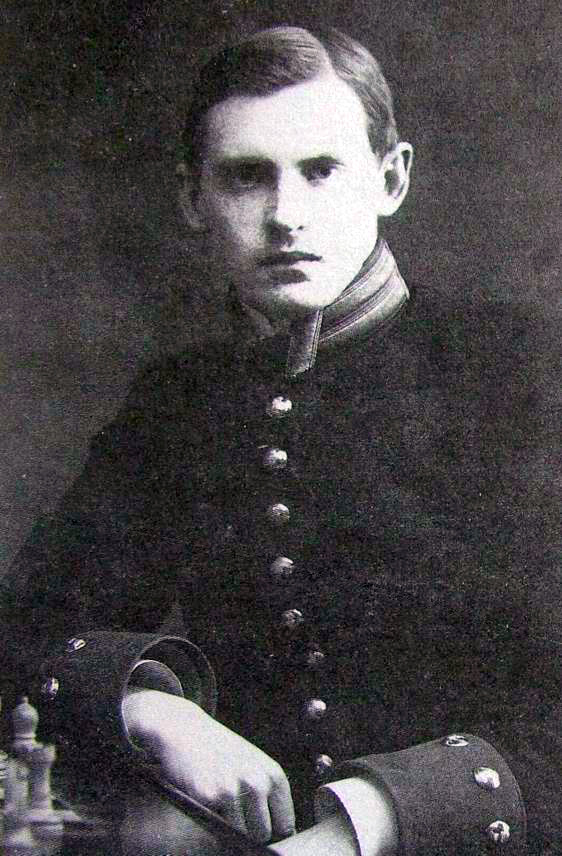
Alekhine in 1909

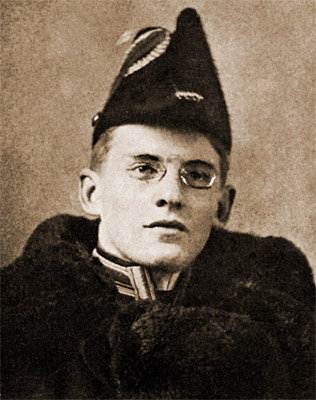
Alexandre Alekhine as law student

Alekhine's first known game was from a correspondence chess tournament that began on December 3, 1902, when he was ten years old. He participated in several correspondence tournaments, sponsored by the chess magazine Shakhmatnoe Obozrenie ("Chess Review"), between 1902 and 1911. In 1907, he played his first over-the-board tournament, the Moscow chess club's Spring Tournament. Later that year, he tied for 11th–13th in the club's Autumn Tournament; his elder brother, Alexei, tied for 4th–6th place. In 1908, Alexander won the club's Spring Tournament, at the age of 15. In 1909, he won the All-Russian Amateur Tournament in Saint Petersburg. For the next few years, he played in increasingly stronger tournaments, some of them outside Russia. At first he had mixed results, but by the age of 16 he had established himself as one of Russia's top players. He played first board in two friendly team matches: St. Petersburg Chess Club vs. Moscow Chess Club in 1911 and Moscow vs. St. Petersburg in 1912 (both drew with Yevgeny Znosko-Borovsky). By the end of 1911, Alekhine moved to St. Petersburg, where he entered the Imperial Law School for Nobles. By 1912, he was the strongest chess player in the St. Petersburg Chess Society. In March 1912, he won the St. Petersburg Chess Club Winter Tournament. In April 1912, he won the 1st Category Tournament of the St. Petersburg Chess Club. In January 1914, Alekhine won his first major Russian tournament, when he tied for first place with Aron Nimzowitsch in the All-Russian Masters Tournament at St. Petersburg. Afterwards, they drew in a mini-match for first prize (each won a game). Alekhine also played several matches in this period, and his results showed the same pattern: mixed at first but later consistently good.

=== Top-level grandmaster (1914–1927) ===
In April–May 1914, another major St. Petersburg 1914 chess tournament was held in the capital of the Russian Empire, in which Alekhine took third place behind Emanuel Lasker and José Raúl Capablanca. By some accounts, Tsar Nicholas II conferred the title of "Grandmaster of Chess" on each of the five finalists (Lasker, Capablanca, Alekhine, Siegbert Tarrasch, and Frank Marshall). (Chess historian Edward Winter has questioned this, stating that the earliest known sources supporting this story are an article by Robert Lewis Taylor in the June 15, 1940, issue of The New Yorker and Marshall's autobiography My 50 Years of Chess (1942).) Alekhine's surprising success made him a serious contender for the World Chess Championship. Whether or not the title was formally awarded to him, "Thanks to this performance, Alekhine became a grandmaster in his own right and in the eyes of the audience." In July 1914, Alekhine tied for first with Marshall in Paris.

==== World War I and post-revolutionary Russia ====
In July–August 1914, Alekhine was leading an international Mannheim tournament, the 19th DSB Congress (German Chess Federation Congress) in Mannheim, Germany, with nine wins, one draw and one loss, when World War I broke out. Alekhine's prize was 1,100 marks (worth about 11,000 euros in terms of purchasing power today). After the declaration of war against Russia, eleven "Russian" players (Alekhine, Efim Bogoljubov, Fedor Bogatyrchuk, Alexander Flamberg, N. Koppelman, Boris Maliutin, Ilya Rabinovich, Peter Romanovsky, Pyotr Saburov, Alexey Selezniev, and Samuil Weinstein) were interned in Rastatt, Germany. On September 14, 17, and 29 of 1914, four of them (Alekhine, Bogatyrchuk, Saburov, and Koppelman) were freed and allowed to return home. Alekhine made his way back to Russia (via Switzerland, Italy, London, Sweden, and Finland) by the end of October 1914. A fifth player, Romanovsky, was released in 1915, and a sixth, Flamberg, was allowed to return to Warsaw in 1916.

When Alekhine returned to Russia, he helped raise money by giving simultaneous exhibitions to aid the Russian chess players who remained interned in Germany. In December 1915, he won the Moscow Chess Club Championship. In April 1916, he won a mini-match against Alexander Evensohn with two wins and one loss at Kiev, and in summer he served in the Union of Cities (Red Cross) on the Austrian front. In September, he played five people in a blindfold display at a Russian military hospital at Tarnopol. In 1918, he won a "triangular tournament" in Moscow. In June of the following year, after the Russians forced the German army to retreat from Ukraine, Alekhine was charged with links with White movement counter-intelligence and was briefly imprisoned in Odessa's death cell by the Odessa Cheka. Rumors appeared in the West that he had been killed by the Bolsheviks.

==== 1920–1927 ====
When conditions in Russia became more settled, Alekhine proved he was among Russia's strongest players. In January 1920, he swept the championship of Moscow (11/11), but was not declared champion because he was not a resident of the city. In October 1920 he won the All-Russian Chess Olympiad in Moscow (+9−0=6); the tournament was retroactively called the first USSR Championship. His brother Alexei took third place in the tournament for amateurs.

In March 1920, Alekhine married Alexandra Batayeva. They divorced the next year. For a short time in 1920–21, he worked as an interpreter for the Communist International (Comintern) and was appointed secretary to the Education Department. In this capacity, he met a Swiss journalist and Comintern delegate, Annelise Rüegg, who was thirteen years his senior, and they married on March 15, 1921. Shortly after getting married, Alekhine was given permission to leave Russia for a visit to the West with his wife, from whom he separated in June 1921. He would never return to Russia, and made France his base for much of the following twenty years.

In 1921–1923, Alekhine played seven mini-matches. In 1921, he won against Nikolay Grigoriev (+2−0=5) in Moscow, drew with Richard Teichmann (+2−2=2) and won against Friedrich Sämisch (+2−0=0), both in Berlin. In 1922, he won against Ossip Bernstein (+1−0=1) and Arnold Aurbach (+1−0=1), both in Paris, and Manuel Golmayo (+1−0=1) in Madrid. In 1923, he won against André Muffang (+2−0=0) in Paris.

From 1921 to 1927, Alekhine won or shared first prize in about two-thirds of the many tournaments in which he played. His least successful efforts were a tie for third place at Vienna 1922 behind Akiba Rubinstein and Richard Réti, and third place at the New York 1924 chess tournament, behind ex-champion Emanuel Lasker and world champion José Raúl Capablanca (but ahead of Frank Marshall, Richard Réti, Géza Maróczy, Efim Bogoljubov, Savielly Tartakower, Frederick Yates, Edward Lasker, and Dawid Janowski). Technically, Alekhine's play was mostly better than his competitors'—even Capablanca's—but he lacked confidence when playing his major rivals.

Alekhine's main goal throughout this period was to arrange a match with Capablanca. He thought the greatest obstacle was not Capablanca's play but the requirement under the 1922 "London rules" (at Capablanca's insistence) that the challenger raise a purse of US$10,000 (~$162,000 in 2022 terms), of which the defending champion would receive over half even if defeated. Alekhine in November 1921, and Rubinstein and Nimzowitsch in 1923, challenged Capablanca but were unable to raise the $10,000. Raising the money was Alekhine's preliminary objective; he even went on tour, playing simultaneous exhibitions for modest fees day after day. In New York on April 27, 1924, he broke the world record for simultaneous blindfold play when he played twenty-six opponents (the previous record was twenty-five, set by Gyula Breyer), winning sixteen games, losing five, and drawing five after twelve hours of play. He broke his own world record on February 1, 1925, by playing twenty-eight games blindfold simultaneously in Paris, winning twenty-two, drawing three, and losing three.

In 1924, he applied for the first time for a residence privilege in France and for French citizenship while pursuing his studies in the Sorbonne Faculty of Law to obtain a PhD. There is no record that he completed his studies there, but he was known as "Dr. Alekhine" in the 1930s.

His French citizenship application was postponed because of his frequent travels abroad to play chess and because he was reported once in April 1922, shortly after his arrival in France, as a "bolshevist charged by the Soviets of a special mission in France". Later in 1927, the French Chess Federation asked the Ministry of Justice to intervene in Alekhine's favor to have him lead the French team in the first Nation tournament to be held in London in July 1927. Nevertheless, Alekhine had to wait for a new law on naturalization which was published on 10 August 1927. The decree granting him French nationality (among hundreds of other applicants) was signed on 5 November 1927 and published in the Official Gazette of the French Republic on 14–15 November 1927, while Alekhine was playing Capablanca for the World title in Buenos Aires.

In October 1926, Alekhine won in Buenos Aires. In December 1926 / January 1927, he defeated Max Euwe 5½–4½ in a training match in the Netherlands. In 1927, he married his third wife, Nadiezda Vasiliev (née Fabritzky), another older woman, the widow of the Russian general V. Vasiliev.

== World Chess Champion, first reign (1927–1935) ==
=== 1927 title match ===
In 1927, Alekhine's challenge to Capablanca was backed by a group of Argentine businessmen and the president of Argentina, who guaranteed the funds, and organized by the Club Argentino de Ajedrez (Argentine Chess Club) in Buenos Aires. In the World Chess Championship match played from September 16 to November 29, 1927 at Buenos Aires, Alekhine won the title, scoring +6−3=25. This was the longest formal World Championship match until the contest in 1984 between Anatoly Karpov and Garry Kasparov. Alekhine's victory surprised almost the entire chess world, since he had never previously won a single game from Capablanca. After Capablanca's death Alekhine expressed surprise at his own victory, since in 1927 he did not think he was superior to Capablanca, and he suggested that Capablanca had been overconfident. Capablanca entered the match with no technical or physical preparation, while Alekhine got himself into good physical condition and had thoroughly studied Capablanca's play. According to Kasparov, Alekhine's research uncovered many small inaccuracies, which occurred because Capablanca was unwilling to concentrate intensely. Vladimir Kramnik has commented that this was the first contest in which Capablanca had no easy wins.

=== Rematch offered, never finalized ===
Immediately after winning the match, Alekhine announced that he was willing to give Capablanca a return match, on the same terms that Capablanca had required as champion: the challenger must provide a stake of US$10,000, of which more than half would go to the defending champion even if he was defeated. Negotiations dragged on for several years, often breaking down when agreement seemed in sight. Their relationship became bitter, and Alekhine demanded much higher appearance fees for tournaments in which Capablanca also played. The rematch never took place. After Capablanca's death in 1942, Alekhine wrote that Capablanca's demand for a $10,000 stake had been an attempt to avoid challenges.

=== Defeats Bogoljubov twice in title matches ===
Alekhine (left) vs. Efim Bogoljubov (right); Emanuel Lasker (sitting, center) and others looking on

Although he never agreed terms for a rematch against Capablanca, Alekhine played two world title matches with Efim Bogoljubov, in 1929 and 1934, winning handily both times. The first was held at Wiesbaden, Heidelberg, Berlin, The Hague, and Amsterdam from September through November 1929. Alekhine retained his title, scoring +11−5=9. From April to June 1934, Alekhine faced Bogoljubov again in a title match held in twelve German cities, defeating him by five games (+8−3=15). In 1929, Bogoljubov was forty years old and perhaps already past his peak.

=== Anti-Bolshevik statements, controversy ===
After the world championship match, Alekhine returned to Paris and spoke against Bolshevism. Afterwards, Nikolai Krylenko, president of the Soviet Chess Federation, published an official memorandum stating that Alekhine should be regarded as an enemy of the Soviets. The Soviet Chess Federation broke all contact with Alekhine until the end of the 1930s. His elder brother Alexei, with whom Alexander Alekhine had a very close relationship, publicly repudiated him and his anti-Soviet utterances shortly afterward, but Alexei may have had little choice about this decision.

=== Early 1930s ===
According to Reuben Fine, Alekhine dominated chess into the mid-1930s. His most famous tournament victories were at the San Remo 1930 chess tournament (+13=2, 3½ points ahead of Nimzowitsch) and the Bled 1931 chess tournament (+15=11, 5½ points ahead of Bogoljubov). He won most of his other tournaments outright, shared first place in two, and the first tournament in which he placed lower than first was Hastings 1933–34 (shared second place, ½ point behind Salo Flohr). In 1933, Alekhine also swept an exhibition match against Rafael Cintron in San Juan (+4−0=0), but only managed to draw another match with Ossip Bernstein in Paris (+1−1=2).

From 1930 to 1935, Alekhine played first board for France at four Chess Olympiads, winning the first brilliancy prize at Hamburg in 1930, gold medals for board one at Prague in 1931 and Folkestone in 1933, and the silver medal for board one at Warsaw in 1935. His loss to Latvian master Hermanis Matisons at Prague in 1931 was his first loss in a serious chess event since winning the world championship.

In the early 1930s, Alekhine travelled the world giving simultaneous exhibitions, including Hawaii, Tokyo, Manila, Singapore, Shanghai, Hong Kong, and the Dutch East Indies. In July 1933, he played thirty-two people blindfold simultaneously (a new world record) in Chicago, winning nineteen, drawing nine and losing four games.

In 1934 Alekhine married his fourth wife, Grace Freeman (née Wishaar), sixteen years his senior. She was the American-born widow of a British tea-planter in Ceylon, who retained her British citizenship to the end of her life and remained Alekhine's wife until his death.

In the early 1930s, around 1933 according to Reuben Fine, it was noticed that Alekhine was drinking increasing amounts of alcohol. Hans Kmoch wrote that Alekhine first drank heavily during the tournament at Bled in 1931, and drank heavily through the 1934 match with Bogoljubov.

== Loss of the World title (1935–1937) ==
Alekhine speaks (1937)

In 1933, Alekhine challenged Max Euwe to a championship match. Euwe, in the early 1930s, was regarded as one of three credible challengers (the others were José Raúl Capablanca and Salo Flohr). Euwe accepted the challenge for October 1935. Earlier that year, Dutch radio sports journalist Han Hollander asked Capablanca for his views on the forthcoming match. In the rare archival film footage, in which Capablanca and Euwe both speak, Capablanca replies: "Dr. Alekhine's game is 20% bluff. Dr. Euwe's game is clear and straightforward. Dr. Euwe's game—not so strong as Alekhine's in some respects—is more evenly balanced." Then Euwe gives his assessment in Dutch, explaining that his feelings alternated from optimism to pessimism, but in the previous ten years, their score had been evenly matched at 7–7.

On October 3, 1935, the world championship match began in Zandvoort, the Netherlands. Although Alekhine took an early lead, from game thirteen onwards Euwe won twice as many games as Alekhine. The challenger became the new champion on December 16, 1935, with nine wins, thirteen draws, and eight losses. This was the first world championship match in which seconds were officially employed: Alekhine had the services of Salo Landau, and Euwe had Géza Maróczy. Euwe's win was a major upset. Kmoch wrote that Alekhine drank no alcohol for the first half of the match, but later took a glass before most games. However, Salo Flohr, who also assisted Euwe, thought overconfidence caused more problems than alcohol did for Alekhine in this match, and Alekhine himself had previously said he would win easily. Later World Champions Vasily Smyslov, Boris Spassky, Anatoly Karpov and Garry Kasparov analyzed the match for their own benefit and concluded that Euwe deserved to win and that the standard of play was worthy of a world championship.

According to Kmoch, Alekhine abstained from alcohol altogether for five years after the 1935 match. In the eighteen months after losing the title, Alekhine played in ten tournaments, with uneven results: tied for first with Paul Keres at Bad Nauheim in May 1936; first place at Dresden in June 1936; second to Flohr at Poděbrady in July 1936; sixth, behind Capablanca, Mikhail Botvinnik, Reuben Fine, Samuel Reshevsky, and Euwe at Nottingham in August 1936; third, behind Euwe and Fine, at Amsterdam in October 1936; tied for first with Salo Landau at Amsterdam (Quadrangular), also in October 1936; in 1936/37 he won at the Hastings New Year tournament, ahead of Fine and Erich Eliskases; first place at Nice (Quadrangular) in March 1937; third, behind Keres and Fine, at Margate in April 1937; tied for fourth with Keres, behind Flohr, Reshevsky and Vladimirs Petrovs, at Kemeri in June–July 1937; tied for second with Bogoljubow, behind Euwe, at Bad Nauheim (Quadrangular) in July 1937.

== World Chess Champion, second reign (1937–1946) ==
=== 1937–1939 ===
Max Euwe was quick to arrange a return match with Alekhine, something José Raúl Capablanca had been unable to obtain after Alekhine won the world title in 1927. Alekhine regained the title from Euwe in December 1937 by a large margin (+10−4=11). In this match, held in the Netherlands, Euwe was seconded by Fine, and Alekhine by Erich Eliskases. The match was a real contest initially, but Euwe collapsed near the end, losing four of the last five games. Fine attributed the collapse to nervous tension, possibly aggravated by Euwe's attempts to maintain a calm appearance. Alekhine played no more title matches, and thus held the title until his death.

1938 began well for Alekhine, who won the Montevideo 1938 chess tournament at Carrasco (in March) and at Margate (in April), and tied for first with Sir George Alan Thomas at Plymouth (in September). In November, however, he only tied for 4th–6th with Euwe and Samuel Reshevsky, behind Paul Keres, Reuben Fine, and Mikhail Botvinnik, ahead of Capablanca and Flohr, at the AVRO tournament in the Netherlands. This tournament was played in each of several Dutch cities for a few days at a time; it was therefore perhaps not surprising that rising stars took the first three places, as the older players found the travel very tiring, though Fine was dismissive of this explanation because the distances were short.

Immediately after the AVRO tournament, Botvinnik, who had finished in third place, challenged Alekhine to a match for the world championship. They agreed on a prize fund of US$10,000 with two-thirds going to the winner, and that if the match were to take place in Moscow, Alekhine would be invited at least three months in advance so that he could play in a tournament to get ready for the match. Other details had not been agreed when World War II interrupted negotiations, which the two players resumed after the war.

Keres, who had won the AVRO tournament on tiebreak over Fine, also challenged Alekhine to a world championship match. Negotiations were proceeding in 1939 when they were disrupted by World War II. During the war Keres' home country, Estonia, was invaded first by the USSR, then by Germany, then again by the USSR. At the end of the war, the Soviet government prevented Keres from continuing the negotiations, on the grounds that he had collaborated with the Germans during their occupation of Estonia (by Soviet standards).

Alekhine was representing France at first board in the 8th Chess Olympiad at Buenos Aires 1939 when World War II broke out in Europe. The assembly of all team captains, with leading roles played by Alekhine (France), Savielly Tartakower (Poland), and Albert Becker (Germany), plus the president of the Argentine Chess Federation, Augusto de Muro, decided to go on with the Olympiad.

Alekhine won the individual silver medal (nine wins, no losses, seven draws), behind Capablanca (only results from finals A and B—separately for both sections—counted for best individual scores). Shortly after the Olympiad, Alekhine swept tournaments in Montevideo (7/7) and Caracas (10/10).

At the end of August 1939, both Alekhine and Capablanca wrote to Augusto de Muro regarding a possible world championship rematch. Whereas the former spoke of a rematch as a virtual certainty, even stating that the Cuban was remaining in Buenos Aires until it came about, the latter referred at length to the financial burden in the aftermath of the Olympiad. Supported by Latin-American financial pledges, José R. Capablanca challenged Alexander Alekhine to a world title match in November. Tentative plans—not, however, backed by a deposit of the required purse ($10,000 in gold)—led to a virtual agreement to play at Buenos Aires, Argentina, beginning on April 14, 1940.

=== World War II (1939–1945) ===
Unlike many participants in the 1939 Chess Olympiad, Alekhine returned to Europe in January 1940. After a short stay in Portugal, he enlisted in the French army as a sanitation officer.

After the fall of France (June 1940), he fled to Marseille. Alekhine tried to go to America by traveling to Lisbon and applying for an American visa. In October 1940, he sought permission to enter Cuba, promising to play a match with Capablanca. This request was denied.

==== Relationship with Nazi Germany ====
Chess historians have had a significant interest in Alekhine's affiliation with Nazi Germany. Of ongoing speculation among historians specialising in mid-20th century European chess is whether or not Alekhine was the author of numerous antisemitic pieces of propaganda published in relevant partisan materials at the time. While an analysis of writing styles is perceived to provide evidence supporting the theory Alekhine willingly worked as a propagandist in a non-coercive fashion, Alekhine himself denied this in written letters.

By some accounts, to protect his wife, Grace, and her French assets (a castle at Saint Aubin-le-Cauf, near Dieppe, which the Nazis looted), he agreed to cooperate with the Nazis. Alekhine took part in chess tournaments in Munich, Salzburg, Kraków/Warsaw, and Prague, organised by Ehrhardt Post, the chief executive of the Nazi-controlled Grossdeutscher Schachbund ("Greater Germany Chess Federation")—Keres, Bogoljubov, and several other strong masters in Nazi-occupied Europe also played in such events. In 1941, he tied for second-third with Erik Lundin in the Munich 1941 chess tournament (Europaturnier in September, won by Gösta Stoltz), shared first with Paul Felix Schmidt at Kraków/Warsaw (the 2nd General Government chess tournament, in October) and won in Madrid (in December). The following year he won in the Salzburg 1942 chess tournament (June 1942) and in Munich (September 1942; the Nazis named this the Europameisterschaft, which means "European Championship"). Later in 1942 he won at Warsaw/Lublin/Kraków (the 3rd GG-ch; October 1942) and tied for first with Klaus Junge in Prague (Duras Jubileé; December 1942). In 1943, he drew a mini-match (+2−2) with Bogoljubov in Warsaw (March 1943), he won in Prague (April 1943) and tied for first with Keres in Salzburg (June 1943).

By late 1943, Alekhine was spending all his time in Spain and Portugal, as the German representative to chess events. This also allowed him to get away from the onrushing Soviet invasion into eastern Europe. In 1944, he narrowly won a match against Ramón Rey Ardid in Zaragoza (+1−0=3; April 1944) and won in Gijón (July 1944). The following year, he won at Madrid (March 1945), tied for second place with Antonio Medina at Gijón (July 1945; the event was won by Antonio Rico), won at Sabadell (August 1945), he tied for first with F. López Núñez in Almeria (August 1945), won in Melilla (September 1945) and took second in Caceres, behind Francisco Lupi (Autumn 1945). Alekhine's last match was with Lupi at Estoril near Lisbon, Portugal, in January 1946. Alekhine won two games, lost one, and drew one.

Alekhine took an interest in the development of the chess prodigy Arturo Pomar and devoted a section of his last book (¡Legado! 1946) to him. They played at Gijón in 1944, when Pomar, aged 12, achieved a creditable draw with the champion.

=== Final year and death ===
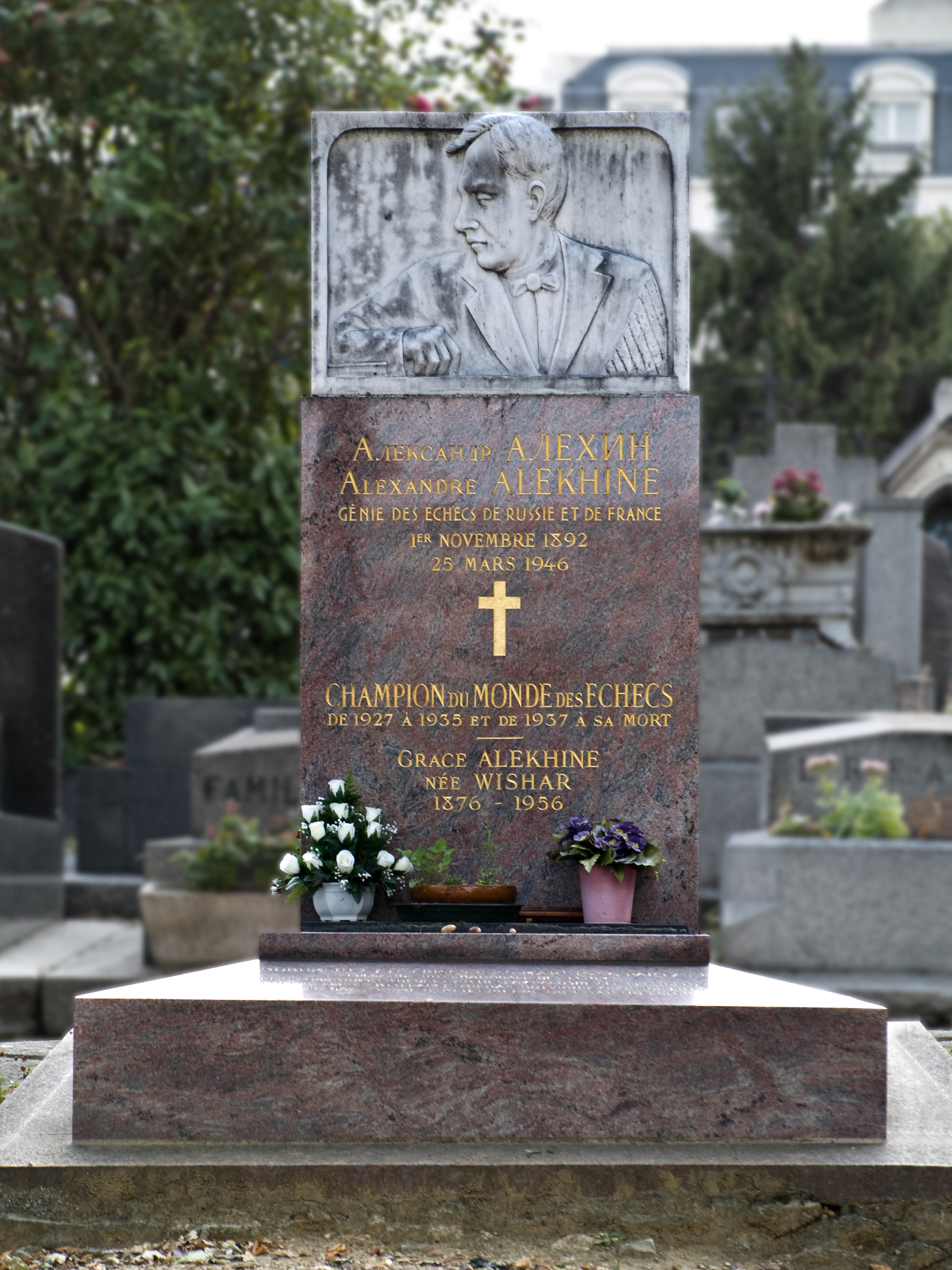
Grave of Alexander Alekhine in Paris, France (reconstruction of the original which was destroyed in 1999)

After World War II, Alekhine was not invited to chess tournaments outside the Iberian Peninsula, because of his alleged Nazi affiliation. His original invitation to the London 1946 tournament was withdrawn when the other competitors protested.

While planning for a World Championship match against Botvinnik, Alekhine died aged 53 in his hotel room in Estoril, Portugal, on March 24, 1946. The circumstances of his death are still a matter of debate. It is usually attributed to a heart attack, but a letter in Chess Life magazine from a witness to the autopsy stated that choking on meat was the actual cause of death. At autopsy, a three-inch-long piece of unchewed meat was discovered blocking his windpipe. Antonio J. Ferreira, M.D., who was present at his autopsy reported "There was no evidence whatsoever that foul play had taken place, neither suicide nor homicide". Some have speculated that he was murdered by a French "death squad". A few years later, Alekhine's son, Alexander Alekhine Jr., said that "the hand of Moscow reached his father." Kevin Spraggett, a Canadian Grandmaster who has lived in Portugal since the late 1980s and has thoroughly investigated Alekhine's death, favors this possibility. Spraggett makes a case for the manipulation of the crime scene and the autopsy by the Portuguese secret police PIDE. He believes that Alekhine was murdered outside his hotel room, probably by Soviet agents.

Alekhine's burial was sponsored by FIDE, and the remains were transferred to the Cimetière du Montparnasse, Paris, France, in 1956.

His gravestone suffered heavy damage by a cyclone on 26 December 1999. The headstone monument was blown over, shattered and fell on the main gravestone. It was later restored.

== Assessment ==
=== Playing strength and style ===
Alekhine's peak period was in the early 1930s, when he won almost every tournament he played, sometimes by huge margins. Afterward, his play declined, and he never won a top-class tournament after 1934. After Alekhine regained his world title in 1937, there were several new contenders, all of whom would have been serious challengers.

Réti vs. Alekhine,
Baden-Baden 1925

Position: h1 white bishop, c1 white rook, h2 white king, f2 white pawn, e2 black knight, d2 white rook, g3 white pawn, f3 white knight, e3 black rook, g4 black bishop, f6 black knight, g7 black pawn, f7 black pawn, b7 white knight, g8 black king, a8 black rook

One of Alekhine's most famous and complicated wins. 31...Ne4 forces the win of White's knight at b7 in twelve moves.

Alekhine was one of the greatest attacking players and could apparently produce combinations at will. What set him apart from most other attacking players was his ability to see the potential for an attack and prepare for it in positions where others saw nothing. Rudolf Spielmann, a master tactician who produced many brilliancies, said, "I can see the combinations as well as Alekhine, but I cannot get to the same positions." Dr. Max Euwe said, "Alekhine is a poet who creates a work of art out of something that would hardly inspire another man to send home a picture post-card." An explanation offered by Réti was, "he beats his opponents by analysing simple and apparently harmless sequences of moves in order to see whether at some time or another at the end of it an original possibility, and therefore one difficult to see, might be hidden." John Nunn commented that "Alekhine had a special ability to provoke complications without taking excessive risks", and Edward Winter called him "the supreme genius of the complicated position".

Nevertheless, Garry Kasparov said that Alekhine's attacking play was based on solid positional foundations, and Harry Golombek went further, saying that "Alekhine was the most versatile of all chess geniuses, being equally at home in every style of play and in all phases of the game." Reuben Fine, a serious contender for the world championship in the late 1930s, wrote in the 1950s that Alekhine's collection of best games was one of the three most beautiful that he knew, and Golombek was equally impressed.

Alekhine's games have a higher percentage of wins than those of any other World Champion, and his drawn games are on average among the longest of all champions'. His desire to win extended beyond formal chess competition. When Fine beat him in some casual games in 1933, Alekhine demanded a match for a small stake. And in table tennis, which Alekhine played enthusiastically but badly, he would often crush the ball when he lost.

Bobby Fischer, in a 1964 article, ranked Alekhine as one of the ten greatest players in history. Fischer, who was famous for the clarity of his play, wrote of Alekhine:

Alekhine has never been a hero of mine, and I've never cared for his style of play. There's nothing light or breezy about it; it worked for him, but it could scarcely work for anyone else. He played gigantic conceptions, full of outrageous and unprecedented ideas. ... [H]e had great imagination; he could see more deeply into a situation than any other player in chess history. ... It was in the most complicated positions that Alekhine found his grandest concepts.

Alekhine's style had a profound influence on Kasparov, who said: "Alexander Alekhine is the first luminary among the others who are still having the greatest influence on me. I like his universality, his approach to the game, his chess ideas. I am sure that the future belongs to Alekhine chess." In 2012, Levon Aronian said that he considers Alekhine the greatest chess player of all time.

=== Influence on the game ===
Alekhine
Endgame study

Position: b7 black king, f7 black pawn, h7 black pawn, d6 white pawn, g6 black pawn, d4 white king, g4 white pawn

White to move and win
Solution: 1.g5! Kc6 2.Ke5 Kd7 3.Kd5! (3.Kf6? Kxd6 4.Kxf7 Ke5) Kd8 4.Kc6 and White wins.

Several openings and opening variations are named after Alekhine. In addition to the well-known Alekhine's Defence (1.e4 Nf6) and the Albin-Chatard-Alekhine Attack in the "orthodox" Paulsen variation of the French Defense, there are Alekhine Variations in: the Budapest Gambit, the Vienna Game, the Exchange Variation of the Ruy Lopez, the Winawer Variation of the French Defense; the Dragon Variation of the Sicilian Defense, the Queen's Gambit Accepted, the Slav Defense, the Queen's Pawn Game, the Catalan Opening and the Dutch Defense (where three different lines bear his name). Irving Chernev commented, "The openings consist of Alekhine's games, with a few variations."

Alekhine also composed a few endgame studies, one of which is shown in the diagram, a miniature (a study with a maximum of seven pieces).

Alekhine wrote over twenty books on chess, mostly annotated editions of the games in a major match or tournament, plus collections of his best games between 1908 and 1937. Unlike Wilhelm Steinitz, Emanuel Lasker, Capablanca and Euwe, he wrote no books that explained his ideas about the game or showed beginners how to improve their play. His books appeal to expert players rather than beginners: they contain many long analyses of variations in critical positions, and "singularities and exceptions were his forte, not rules and simplifications".

Although Alekhine was declared an enemy of the Soviet Union after his anti-Bolshevik statement in 1928, he was gradually rehabilitated by the Soviet chess elite following his death in 1946. Alexander Kotov's research on Alekhine's games and career, culminating in a biography, Alexander Alekhine, led to a Soviet series of Alekhine Memorial tournaments. The first of these, at Moscow 1956, was won jointly by Botvinnik and Vasily Smyslov. In their book The Soviet School of Chess Kotov and Yudovich devoted a chapter to Alekhine, called him "Russia's greatest player" and praised his capacity for seizing the initiative by concrete tactical play in the opening. Botvinnik wrote that the Soviet School of chess learned from Alekhine's fighting qualities, capacity for self-criticism and combinative vision. Alekhine had written that success in chess required "Firstly, self-knowledge; secondly, a firm comprehension of my opponent's strength and weakness; thirdly, a higher aim – ... artistic and scientific accomplishments which accord our chess equal rank with other arts."

=== Accusations of "improving" games ===
Position: a8 black rook, c8 black bishop, g8 white queen, a7 black pawn, b7 black pawn, b6 black king, c6 black knight, c5 black bishop, d5 black pawn, f4 white queen, e3 white queen, f3 white king, c2 black queen, f2 white pawn, b1 black queen, f1 white bishop, g1 white knight, h1 white rook

Famous and much-analysed position from the "Five Queens" game

Samuel Reshevsky wrote that Alekhine "allegedly made up games against fictitious opponents in which he came out the victor and had these games published in various chess magazines." In a 2002 book Andy Soltis lists "Alekhine's 15 Improvements". The most famous example is his game with five queens in Moscow in 1915. In the actual game, Alekhine, playing as Black, beat Grigoriev in the Moscow 1915 tournament; but in one of his books he presented the "Five Queens" variation (starting with a move he rejected as Black in the original game) as an actual game won by the White player in Moscow in 1915. (He did not say in the book who was who in this version, nor that it was in the tournament.)

In the position shown in the diagram, which never arose in real play, Alekhine claimed that White wins by 24.Rh6, as after some complicated play Black is mated or goes into an endgame a queen down. A later computer-assisted analysis concludes that White can force a win, but only by diverging from Alekhine's move sequence at move 20, while there are only three queens.

Chess historian Edward Winter investigated a game Alekhine allegedly won in fifteen moves via a queen sacrifice at Sabadell in 1945. Some photos of the game in progress were discovered that showed the players during the game and their chessboard. Based on the position that the chess pieces had taken on the chessboard in this photo, the game could never have taken the course that was stated in the published version. This raised suspicions that the published version was made up. Even if the published version is a fake, however, there is no doubt that Alekhine did defeat his opponent in the actual game, and there is no evidence that Alekhine was the source of the famous fifteen-move win whose authenticity is doubted.

=== Accusations of antisemitism ===
During World War II, Alekhine played in several tournaments held in Germany or German-occupied territory, as did many strong players in occupied and neutral countries. In March 1941, a series of articles appeared under Alekhine's name in the Pariser Zeitung, a German-language newspaper published in Paris by the occupying German forces. Among other things, these articles said that Jews had a great talent for exploiting chess but showed no signs of chess artistry; described the hypermodern theories of Nimzowitsch and Réti as "this cheap bluff, this shameless self-publicity", hyped by "the majority of Anglo-Jewish pseudo-intellectuals"; and described his 1937 match with Euwe as "a triumph against the Jewish conspiracy".

During interviews with two Spanish newspapers in September 1941, Alekhine criticised Jewish chess strategy. In one of these, he said that Aryan chess was aggressive but "the Semitic concept admitted the idea of pure defence", thus the "Jewish" style was supposed to focus merely on exploiting the opponents' mistakes. He also praised rival chessplayer Capablanca for taking the world title from "the Jew Lasker". He is reported to have expressed similar views in an interview to the Czech media Svět in 1942.

Almost immediately after the liberation of Paris (and before World War II ended), Alekhine publicly stated that "he had to write two chess articles for the Pariser Zeitung before the Germans granted him his exit visa ... Articles which Alekhine claims were purely scientific were rewritten by the Germans, published and made to treat chess from a racial viewpoint." He wrote at least two further disavowals, in an open letter to the organizer of the 1946 London tournament (W. Hatton-Ward) and in his posthumous book ¡Legado!.

Extensive investigations by Ken Whyld have not yielded conclusive evidence of the authenticity of the articles. Chess writer Jacques Le Monnier claimed in a 1986 issue of Europe Échecs that in 1958 he saw some of Alekhine's notebooks and found, in Alekhine's own handwriting, the exact text of the first antisemitic article, which appeared in Pariser Zeitung on March 18, 1941. In his 1973 book 75 parties d'Alekhine ("75 of Alekhine's games"), however, Le Monnier had written "It will never be known whether Alekhine was behind these articles or whether they were manipulated by the editor of the Pariser Zeitung."

British chess historian Edward G. Winter notes that the articles in the Pariser Zeitung misspelled the names of several famous chess masters, which could be interpreted as evidence of forgery or as attempts by Alekhine to signal that he was being forced to write things that he did not believe; but these could simply have been typesetting errors, as Alekhine's handwriting was not easy to read. The articles contained (probably) incorrect claims that Lionel Kieseritzky (Kieseritsky in English, Kizierycki in Polish) was a Polish Jew, although Kieseritzky was neither Polish nor Jewish. Winter concludes: "Although, as things stand, it is difficult to construct much of a defence for Alekhine, only the discovery of the articles in his own handwriting will settle the matter beyond all doubt." Under French copyright law, Alekhine's notebooks did not enter the public domain until January 1, 2017.

There is evidence that Alekhine was not antisemitic in his personal or chess relationships with Jews. In June 1919, he was arrested by the Cheka, imprisoned in Odessa and sentenced to death. Yakov Vilner, a Jewish master, saved him by sending a telegram to the chairman of the Ukrainian Council of People's Commissars, who knew of Alekhine and ordered his release. Alekhine accepted and apparently used chess analysis from Charles Jaffe in his World Championship match against Capablanca. Jaffe was a Jewish master who lived in New York City, which Alekhine often visited, and upon his return to New York after defeating Capablanca, Alekhine played a short match as a favour to Jaffe, without financial remuneration. Alekhine's second for the 1935 match with Max Euwe was the master Salo Landau, a Dutch Jew. The American Jewish grandmaster Arnold Denker wrote that he found Alekhine very friendly in chess settings, taking part in consultation games and productive analysis sessions. Denker also wrote that Alekhine treated the younger and (at that time) virtually unproven Denker to dinner on many occasions in New York during the 1930s, when the economy was very weak because of the Great Depression. Denker added that Alekhine, during the early 1930s, opined that the American Jewish grandmaster Isaac Kashdan might be his next challenger (this did not in fact take place). He gave chess lessons to 14-year-old prodigy Gerardo Budowski, a German Jew, in Paris in spring 1940. Alekhine also married an American woman who may or may not have had Jewish ancestry, Grace Wishaar, as his fourth wife. Grace Alekhine was the women's champion of Paris in 1944.

== Writings ==
Alekhine wrote over twenty books on chess. Some of the best-known are:

- Alekhine, Alexander (1985). My Best Games of Chess 1908–1937. Dover. ISBN 0-486-24941-7. Originally published in two volumes as My Best Games of Chess 1908–1923 (published in 1929) and My Best Games of Chess 1924–1937 (published in 1939)
- Alekhine, Alexander (1968). The Book of the Hastings International Masters' Chess Tournament 1922. Dover. ISBN 0-486-21960-7.
- Alekhine, Alexander (1984) [1961]. The Book of the New York International Chess Tournament 1924. Dover. ISBN 0-486-20752-8.
- Alekhine, Alexander (1962). The Book of the Nottingham International Chess Tournament. Dover. ISBN 0-486-20189-9.
- Alekhine, Alexander (1973). The World's Chess Championship, 1937. Dover. ISBN 0-486-20455-3.

Games analysis published after 1938 were edited by Edward Winter and published in 1980 in the book:

- Alekhine, Alexander; Edward Winter (1992). 107 Great Chess Battles 1939–1945. Dover. ISBN 0-486-27104-8.

== Summary of results in competitions ==
=== Tournament results ===
Here are Alekhine's placings and scores in tournaments:

- Under score, + games won, − games lost, = games drawn

Date	Location	Place	Score		Notes
1907	Moscow	11–13	5½/15	+5−9=1	his brother Alexei Alekhine tied for 4–6th
1908	Moscow	1st	?	?	Moscow Chess Club Spring Tournament
1908	Düsseldorf	3–4	9/13	+8−3=2	16th DSB Congress, A Tournament
1908/09	Moscow	1st	6½/9	+5−1=3	Moscow Chess Club Autumn Tournament
1909	Saint Petersburg	1st	13/16	+12−2=2	All-Russian Amateur Tournament
1910	Hamburg	7–8	8½/16	+5−4=7	17th DSB Congress, Schlechter won
1911	Cologne	1st	3/3	+3−0=0	Quadrangular
1911	Carlsbad	8–9	13½/25	+11−9=5	Teichmann won
1912	Saint Petersburg	1–2	8/9	+8-1=0	First Winter Tournament, lost a game to Vasily Osipovich Smyslov
1912	Saint Petersburg	1st	7/9	+6−1=2 ?	Second Winter Tournament, lost a game to Boris Koyalovich
1912	Stockholm	1st	8½/10	+8−1=1	8th Nordic Championship, ahead of Spielmann
1912	Vilnius	6–7	8½/18	+7−8=3	7th Russian Championship (All-Russian Masters' Tournament), Rubinstein won
1913	Saint Petersburg	1–2	2/3	+2−1=0	Quadrangular, tied with Levenfish
1913	Scheveningen	1st	11½/13	+11−1=1	ahead of Janowski
1913/14	Saint Petersburg	1–2	13½/17	+13−3=1	8th Russian Championship (All-Russian Masters' Tournament), tied with Nimzowitsch
1914	Saint Petersburg	3rd	10/18	+6−4=8	Lasker 13½, Capablanca 13, Alekhine 10, Tarrasch 8½, Marshall 8
1914	Paris	1–2	2½/3	+2−0=1	Cafe Continental Quadrangular, tied with Marshall, third Muffang, fourth Hallegua
1914	Mannheim	leading	9½/11	+9−1=1	19th DSB Congress, interrupted by the start of World War I
1915	Moscow	1st	10½/11	+10−0=1	Moscow Chess Club Championship
1919/20	Moscow	1st	11/11	+11−0=0	Moscow City Championship, not declared Moscow Champion because he was not a resident of Moscow
1920	Moscow	1st	12/15	+9−0=6	later recognised as the 1st USSR Championship
1921	Triberg	1st	7/8	+6−0=2	ahead of Bogoljubov
1921	Budapest	1st	8½/11	+6−0=5	ahead of Grünfeld
1921	The Hague	1st	8/9	+7−0=2	ahead of Tartakower
1922	Pistyan	2–3	14½/18	+12−1=5	tied with Spielmann, behind Bogoljubov
1922	London	2nd	11½/15	+8−0=7	Capablanca 13, Alekhine 11½, Vidmar 11, Rubinstein 10½
1922	Hastings	1st	7½/10	+6−1=3	Rubinstein 7, Bogoljubov and Thomas 4½, Tarrasch 4, Yates 2½
1922	Vienna	3–6	9/14	+7−3=4	Rubinstein won
1923	Margate	2–5	4½/7	+3−1=3	Grünfeld won
1923	Carlsbad	1–3	11½/17	+9−3=5	tied with Bogoljubov and Maróczy
1923	Portsmouth	1st	11½/12	+11−0=1	ahead of Vajda
1924	New York	3rd	12/20	+6−2=12	Lasker 16, Capablanca 14½, Alekhine 12, Marshall 11, Réti 10½. Maróczy 10, Bogoljubov 9½
1925	Paris	1st	6½/8	+5−0=3	ahead of Tartakower
1925	Bern	1st	4/6	+3−1=2	Quadrangular
1925	Baden-Baden	1st	16/20	+12−0=8	ahead of Rubinstein
1925/26	Hastings	1–2	8½/9	+8−0=1	tied with Vidmar
1926	Semmering	2nd	12½/17	+11−3=3	Spielmann won
1926	Dresden	2nd	7/9	+5−0=4	Nimzowitsch won
1926	Scarborough	1st	5½/6	+5−0=1	Alekhine won a play-off match against Colle 2–0
1926	Birmingham	1st	5/5	+5−0=0	ahead of Znosko-Borovsky
1926	Buenos Aires	1st	10/10	+10−0=0	ahead of Villegas and Illa
1927	New York	2nd	11½/20	+5−2=13	Capablanca 14, Alekhine 11½, Nimzowitsch 10½, Vidmar 10, Spielmann 8, Marshall 6
1927	Kecskemét	1st	12/16	+8−0=8	ahead of Nimzowitsch and Steiner
1929	Bradley Beach	1st	8½/9	+8−0=1	ahead of Lajos Steiner
1930	San Remo	1st	14/15	+13−0=2	Nimzowitsch 10½; Rubinstein 10; Bogoljubov 9½; Yates 9
1931	Nice	1st	6/8	+4−0=4	consultation tournament
1931	Bled	1st	20½/26	+15−0=11	Bogoljubov 15; Nimzowitsch 14; Flohr, Kashdan, Stoltz and Vidmar 13½
1932	Bern	1–3	2/3	+2−1=0	Quadrangular, tied with Voellmy and Naegeli
1932	Bern	1st	12½/15	+11−1=3	Swiss Championship (title awarded to Hans Johner and Paul Johner)
1932	London	1st	9/11	+7−0=4	ahead of Flohr
1932	Pasadena	1st	8½/11	+7−1=3	ahead of Kashdan
1932	Mexico City	1–2	8½/9	+8−0=1	tied with Kashdan
1933	Paris	1st	8/9	+7−0=2	ahead of Tartakower
1933/34	Hastings	2nd	6½/9	+4−0=5	Flohr 7, Alekhine and Andor Lilienthal 6½, C.H.O'D. Alexander and Eliskases 5
1934	Rotterdam	1st	3/3	+3−0=0	Quadrangular
1934	Zürich	1st	13/15	+12−1=2	Swiss Championship (title awarded to Hans Johner)
1935	Örebro	1st	8½/9	+8−0=1	ahead of Lundin
1936	Bad Nauheim	1–2	6½/9	+4−0=5	tied with Keres
1936	Dresden	1st	6½/9	+5−1=3	ahead of Engels
1936	Poděbrady	2nd	12½/17	+8−0=9	Flohr won
1936	Nottingham	6th	9/14	+6−2=6	Botvinnik and Capablanca 10; Euwe, Fine and Reshevsky 9½
1936	Amsterdam	3rd	4½/7	+3−1=3	Euwe and Fine won
1936	Amsterdam	1–2	2½/3	+2−0=1	Quadrangular, tied with Landau
1936/37	Hastings	1st	8/9	+7−0=2	Fine 7½, Eliskases 5½, Vidmar and Feigins 4½
1937	Margate	3rd	6/9	+6−3=0	tied for 1–2 were Keres and Fine
1937	Kemeri	4–5	11½/17	+7−1=9	tied for 1–3 were Flohr, Petrovs and Reshevsky
1937	Bad Nauheim	2–3	3½/6	+3−2=1	Quadrangular, Euwe won, the other players were Bogoljubov and Sämisch
1937	Nice	1st	2½/3	+2−0=1	Quadrangular
1938	Montevideo	1st	13/15	+11−0=4	ahead of Guimard
1938	Margate	1st	7/9	+6−1=2	ahead of Spielmann
1938	Netherlands (ten cities)	4–6	7/14	+3−3=8	AVRO tournament, Keres and Fine 8½; Botvinnik 7½; Alekhine, Euwe and Reshevsky 7; Capablanca 6
1939	Montevideo	1st	7/7	+7−0=0	ahead of Golombek
1939	Caracas	1st	10/10	+10−0=0	
1941	Munich	2–3	10½/15	+8−2=5	tied with Lundin, behind Stoltz
1941	Kraków, Warsaw	1–2	8½/11	+6−0=5	tied with Schmidt
1941	Madrid	1st	5/5	+5−0=0	
1942	Salzburg	1st	7½/10	+7−2=1	ahead of Keres
1942	Munich	1st	8½/11	+7−1=3	1st European Championship, ahead of Keres
1942	Warsaw, Lublin, Kraków	1st	7½/11	+6−1=3	ahead of Junge
1942	Prague	1–2	8½/11	+6−0=5	tied with Junge
1943	Prague	1st	17/19	+15−0=4	ahead of Keres
1943	Salzburg	1–2	7½/10	+5−0=5	tied with Keres
1944	Gijón	1st	7½/8	+7−0=1	
1945	Madrid	1st	8½/9	+8−0=1	
1945	Gijón	2–3	6½/9	+6−2=1	tied with Medina, behind Rico
1945	Sabadell	1st	7½/9	+6−0=3	
1945	Almeria	1–2	5½/8	+4−1=3	tied with Lopez Nunez
1945	Melilla	1st	6½/7	+6−0=1	
1945	Caceres	2nd	3½/5	+3−1=1	Lupi won

=== Match results ===
Here are Alekhine's results in matches:

- Under score, + games won, − games lost, = games drawn

Date	Opponent	Result	Location	Score		Notes
1908	Curt von Bardeleben	Won	Düsseldorf	4½/5	+4−0=1	
1908	Hans Fahrni	Drew	Munich	1½/3	+1−1=1	
1908	Benjamin Blumenfeld	Won	Moscow	4½/5	+4−0=1	
1908	Vladimir Nenarokov	Lost	Moscow	0/3	+0−3=0	
1913	Stepan Levitsky	Won	Saint Petersburg	7/10	+7−3=0	
1913	Edward Lasker	Won	Paris, London	3/3	+3−0=0	
1913	José Raúl Capablanca	Lost	Saint Petersburg	0/2	+0−2=0	exhibition match
1914	Aron Nimzowitsch	Drew	Saint Petersburg	1/2	+1−1=0	play-off match
1916	Alexander Evensohn	Won	Kiev	2/3	+2−1=0	
1918	Abram Rabinovich	Won	Moscow	3½/4	+3−0=1	
1918	Boris Verlinsky	Won	Odessa	6/6	+6−0=0	
1920	Nikolay Pavlov-Pianov	Drew	Moscow	1/2	+1−1=0	training match
1921	Nikolay Grigoriev	Won	Moscow	4½/7	+2−0=5	training match
1921	Efim Bogoljubow	Drew	Triberg	2/4	+1−1=2	"secret" training match
1921	Richard Teichmann	Drew	Berlin	3/6	+2−2=2	
1921	Friedrich Sämisch	Won	Berlin	2/2	+2−0=0	
1922	Ossip Bernstein	Won	Paris	1½/2	+1−0=1	
1922	Arnold Aurbach	Won	Paris	1½/2	+1−0=1	
1922	Manuel Golmayo	Won	Madrid	1½/2	+1−0=1	
1923	André Muffang	Won	Paris	2/2	+2−0=0	
1926	Edgar Colle	Won	Scarborough	2/2	+2−0=0	play-off match
1926/7	Max Euwe	Won	Amsterdam	5½/10	+3−2=5	
1927	José Raúl Capablanca	Won	Buenos Aires	18½/34	+6−3=25	Won world chess championship
1927	Charles Jaffe	Won	New York	2/2	+2−0=0	exhibition match
1929	Efim Bogoljubow	Won	Wiesbaden, Berlin, Amsterdam	15½/25	+11−5=9	Retained world chess championship
1933	Rafael Cintron	Won	San Juan	4/4	+4−0=0	exhibition match
1933	Ossip Bernstein	Drew	Paris	2/4	+1−1=2	
1934	Efim Bogoljubow	Won	Baden-Baden, Villingen, Pforzheim, Bayreuth, Kissingen, Berlin	15½/25	+8−3=15	Retained world chess championship
1935	Max Euwe	Lost	Amsterdam, The Hague, Utrecht	14½/30	+8−9=13	Lost world chess championship
1937	Max Euwe	Won	Rotterdam, Haarlem, Leiden, Zwolle, Amsterdam, Delft, The Hague	15½/25	+10−4=11	Won world chess championship
1937	Max Euwe	Lost	The Hague	2/5	+1−2=2	exhibition match
1941	Lopez Esnaola	Won	Vitoria	2/2	+2−0=0	
1943	Efim Bogoljubow	Drew	Warsaw	2/4	+2−2=0	
1944	Ramón Rey Ardid	Won	Zaragoza	2½/4	+1−0=3	
1946	Francisco Lupi	Won	Estoril	2½/4	+2−1=1	

=== Chess Olympiad results ===
Here are Alekhine's results in Chess Olympiads. He played top board for France in all these events.

- Under score, + games won, − games lost, = games drawn

Date	Location	Number	Score		Notes
1930	Hamburg	3	9/9	+9−0=0	Alekhine won the brilliancy prize for his game against Gideon Ståhlberg (Sweden). He did not win a medal because the medallists played 17 games each.
1931	Prague	4	13½/18	+10−1=7	Alekhine won the gold medal for 1st board. His loss to Hermanis Matisons (Latvia) was his first loss in a serious chess event since winning the world championship.
1933	Folkestone	5	9½/12	+8−1=3	Alekhine won the gold medal for 1st board. His loss to Savielly Tartakower (Poland) was his second and last loss in chess olympiads.
1935	Warsaw	6	12/17	+7−0=10	Alekhine won the silver medal for 1st board (Salo Flohr of Czechoslovakia took the gold by scoring 13/17).
1939	Buenos Aires	8	7½/10 (12½/16)	+9−0=7	Alekhine won the silver medal for 1st board (José Raúl Capablanca of Cuba took the gold by scoring 8½/11). Only games in the final stage were counted for awarding the medals. The first score is for the final stage, the one in parentheses is Alekhine's total score.

== Other information ==
In the town of Cascais, Portugal, there is a street named after Alekhine: Rua Alexander Alekhine. Cascais is near Estoril, where Alekhine died.

His book My Best Games of Chess 1924–1937 featured in Michael Powell and Emeric Pressburger's A Matter of Life and Death, filmed in the year of his death.

The asteroid 1909 Alekhin was named in honor of Alekhine.

== Collected games ==
A series of books containing Alekhine's chess games, written and collected by chess player and teacher Matěj Gargulák of Brno:

- Miniatures (1930 a 1962) – Volume I. 1909 – 1914
- Before World War (1930 a 1962) – Volume II. 1909 – 1914
- After World War (1930 a 1962) – Volume III.
  - Part A. – Book of Years (1921 – 1929)
  - Part. B – Book of Years (1930 – 1938)
- Matches (1930 a 1962) – Volume IV.
- Various (1930 a 1962) – Volume V.

== Notes ==
Awards
Preceded by José Raúl Capablanca	World Chess Champion; 1927–1935	Succeeded by Max Euwe
Preceded by Max Euwe	World Chess Champion; 1937–1946	Vacant Interregnum of World Chess Champions Title next held by Mikhail Botvinnik
