= Nikolai Grigoriev =

Russian chess player

Nikolai Dmitrievich Grigoriev

Nikolai (Nikolay) Dmitrievich Grigoriev (Russian: Никола́й Дми́триевич Григо́рьев) was a Russian chess player and a composer of endgame studies. He was born on 14 August 1895 in Moscow, and he died there in 1938.

His father was a professional musician in the Bolshoi Theatre orchestra. At the relatively late age of eighteen, Grigoriev joined the Moscow chess club and played in the Moscow tournament of 1915. There, one of his opponents was the future world champion Alexander Alekhine against whom he lost but later maintained friendly relations.

In 1917, he was drafted into the Imperial Russian army in the First World War and was sent to the front. He was wounded and returned severely ill.

In early October 1937, Grigoriev returned from a trip to the Far East and Siberia, where he gave lectures and played. The NKVD militia on the train arrested him. Grigoriev was frail; he lost consciousness immediately after the use of force, and his throat began to constantly bleed. After an interrogation, the interrogators had to wash down the room. An unexpected illness then confined him to bed. Severe complications required immediate surgery. He was severely weakened and died of lung cancer.

== Playing career ==
Grigoriev was Moscow Champion four times: in 1921, 1922, 1923–24 and 1929. His playing career spanned from 1910 to 1929. He lost games to Alexander Alekhine (1915 and 1919) and Mikhail Botvinnik (1927); both would later become chess world champions.

In the 1920 USSR Chess Championship (Moscow 4–24 October 1920) Grigoriev took 5-7th place (8 wins, 6 losses, and only one draw), despite undertaking extensive and difficult organizational duties including finding scare food rations for the participants.

Before his departure from Russia in 1921, Alekhine played a match with Grigoriev of 7 games resulting in 2 wins and 5 draws in favour of Alekhine. Analyzing the match, Levenfish said: "In some of the games only exceptional ingenuity saved Alekhine from destruction."

Grigoriev competed in various internal Soviet tournaments. His tournament victories included: the Third Chess Championship of the Trade Unions 1928 and he divided the 1-2nd places with Peter Romanovsky in the international Workers' Congress in Leningrad.

Grigoriev became better known, however, as a chess organizer and educationalist, chess journalist and problemist.

== Composing career ==
Grigoriev composed more than 300 endgame studies. He is especially noted for his prolific output of pawn endgames with only kings and pawns on the board, where he had no equal. In 1935, the French magazine La Stratégie organized a tourney for endgame studies with two pawns against one, and Grigoriev ran away with ten of the twelve awards. Players called him the "world champion in the Pawn end-game."

=== Example study 1 ===
Grigoriev, 3rd prize, Shakhmat, 1928

Position: g8 white king, a6 black pawn, b6 black pawn, h6 black pawn, h4 black king, d3 white pawn, e3 white pawn

Diagram 1. White to move and win.

In Diagram 1, White wins as follows:

1.d4 Kg5
2.Kf7 Kf5
3.d5 Ke5
4.e4

Now Black can choose which of his three pawns he wishes to promote to a queen, but he loses no matter what.

4...a5
5.Ke7 a4
6.d6 a3
7.d7 a2
8.d8=Q a1=Q
9.Qh8+ wins the queen by a skewer.

If Black queens the b-pawn instead, the queen on b1 is captured after 9.Qd6+ Kxe4 10.Qg6+. If Black tries to get a queen on h1, it's gone after 9.Qd6+ Kxe4 10.Qc6+.

=== Example study 2 ===
Grigoriev, 1930

Position: a7 black pawn, d7 black pawn, a3 black king, f2 white pawn, h2 white pawn, h1 white king

Diagram 2. White to move and win.

In Diagram 2, White wins a pawn race through a beautiful repetitive maneuver:

1.f4

Threatens to queen on move 5 with check, after which the queen can stop Black's pawn if it advances to d2. Black's best defense is to try to chase the White pawn with his king.

1...Kb4
2.h4 d5

The Black king cannot catch the h-pawn, so now Black must counterattack by advancing his d-pawn. Now if White plays 3.h5, Black will queen on d1 with check. So...

3.f5 Kc5
4.h5 d4

And the pattern repeats itself again:

5.f6 Kd6
6.h6 d3
7.f7 Ke7
8.h7 d2

Now, finally, White provides the coup de grace:

9. f8=Q+ Kxf8
10. h8=Q+ Ke7
11. Qd4 and White wins.

The following two studies won prizes at the 1936 French journal contest:

=== Example study 3 ===
Grigoriev, 1936

Position: d5 black king, h5 black pawn, h4 white pawn, h3 white king, e2 white pawn

Diagram 3. White to move and win.

White wins by playing the moves correctly.

1. Kg3! Ke4
2. Kg2! Ke3
3. Kf1 Ke4
4. Ke1 Ke3
5. Kd1 Kf4
6. Kd2 Ke4
7. e3 Kf3
8. Kd3 Kg3
9. Ke4! Kg4
10.Ke5 Kxh4
11.Kf4 Kh3
12. e4 Kg2
13. e5 h4
14. e6 h3
15. e7 h2
16. e8=Q h1=Q
17.Qe2+ and mate soon follows.

=== Example study 4 ===
Grigoriev, 1936

Position: e6 black pawn, f6 black king, c3 black pawn, c2 white pawn, b1 white king

Diagram 4. White to move and draw.

A draw seems to be a vain hope. But here is how it is done:

1.Kc1 Ke5
2.Kd1 Kd4
3.Ke2 Ke4
4.Kf2 Kf4
5.Ke2 Kg3
6.Kd3! e5
7.Ke3! Kg2
8.Ke2 e4
9.Ke1 Kf3
10.Kf1 e3
11.Ke1 e2 Stalemate.
