= Aleksandr Levin =

Russian chess player

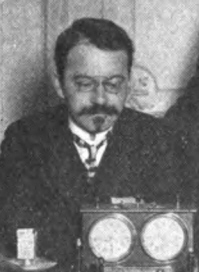
Aleksandr Mitrofanovich Levin

Aleksandr Mitrofanovich Levin Александр Митрофанович Левин (15 May 1871 – May 1929) was a chess master from the Russian Empire and later the Soviet Union.

He twice shared 1st with Mikhail Chigorin in St. Petersburg in 1900 and 1902. He tied for 11-12th at Hannover 1902 (the 13th DSB Congress, Dawid Janowski won).
