= Emanuel Schiffers =

Russian chess player (1850–1904)

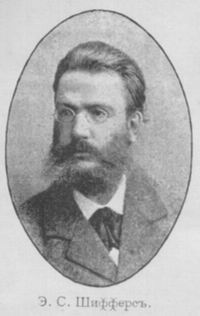
Emanuel Schiffers

Emanuel (Emmanuel) Stepanovich Schiffers (Russian: Эммануил Степанович Шифферс; 4 May [O.S. 22 April] 1850 – 12 December [O.S. 29 November] 1904) was a Russian chess player and chess writer. For many years he was the second leading Russian player after Mikhail Chigorin.

== Career ==
Schiffers' parents emigrated from Germany. He was born in Saint Petersburg and also died there.

Schiffers held the title of Russian champion for 10 years before finally being defeated by his student, Mikhail Chigorin, in 1880. At their first meeting in 1873, Schiffers was able to offer Chigorin (also from St. Petersburg) knight odds. In 1878 they played on even terms, Schiffers losing the first of two matches 7–3, but winning the second 7½–6½, thus establishing himself as the second strongest player in Russia after Chigorin himself. They later played two more matches with Chigorin winning both.

At Rostov-on-Don in 1896, he played a match against former world chess champion Wilhelm Steinitz, losing 6½–4½.

Schiffers played eight major foreign tournaments from Frankfurt 1887 to Cologne 1898. His best tournament result was at Hastings 1895 where he finished sixth with 12/21 (Harry Pillsbury won). In 1899 and 1900/01, he took second places, behind Chigorin, in the All Russian Masters Tournament (1st and 2nd RUS-ch).

Schiffers was known as "Russia's Chess Teacher". In 1889, he gave the first public lectures on chess theory in Russia, at the St. Petersburg Chess Association and in other cities. He wrote the chess textbook Samouchitel shakhmatnoi igry (Chess Self Taught, published 1906). In November 1899 it was reported that he became insane and was taken to an asylum.

== Notable game ==
Schiffers vs. Harmonist, Frankfurt 1887

Position: a8 black rook, c8 black bishop, f8 black rook, g8 black king, a7 black pawn, b7 black pawn, c7 black queen, f7 black pawn, g7 black pawn, h7 black pawn, c6 black pawn, g6 black knight, g5 white knight, a4 white pawn, c4 white bishop, d4 white pawn, f4 black knight, b3 white queen, b2 white pawn, d2 white knight, f2 white pawn, g2 white pawn, h2 white pawn, c1 white rook, e1 white rook, g1 white king

Schiffers played 16.Re8!

Schiffers–Harmonist, Frankfurt 1887, has been anthologized in many game collections and was dubbed "Schiffers' Immortal Game" by Irving Chernev. It features a spectacular rook sacrifice followed by a long winning combination.

1.e4 e5 2.Nf3 Nc6 3.Bc4 Bc5 4.c3 Nf6 5.d4 exd4 6.cxd4 Bb4+ 7.Bd2 Bxd2+ 8.Nbxd2 d5 9.exd5 Nxd5 10.Qb3 Nce7 11.0-0 0-0 12.Rfe1 c6 13.a4 Qc7 14.Rac1 Nf4? 15.Ng5 Neg6 (diagram) 16.Re8! Rxe8 17.Bxf7+ Kh8 18.Bxe8 Ne2+ 19.Kh1 Nxc1 20.Nf7+ Kg8 21.Nh6+ Kf8 22.Qg8+ Ke7 23.Bxg6 hxg6 24.Qxg7+ Kd8 25.Qf8+ Kd7 26.Ne4 Qd8 27.Qd6+ Ke8 28.Nf6+ 1–0

== Sources ==
- Hooper, David; Whyld, Kenneth (1992), The Oxford Companion to Chess (2 ed.), Oxford University Press, p. 356, ISBN 0-19-280049-3
- O'Connell, Kevin J. (1977), "Schiffers, Emanuel S.", in Golombek, Harry (ed.), Golombek's Encyclopedia of Chess, Crown Publishing, p. 289, ISBN 0-517-53146-1 (gives 1906 as year of death, evidently a typo)
