= World Chess Championship 1892 =

Chess game between Wilhelm Steinitz and Mikhail Chigorin

	Defending champion	Challenger
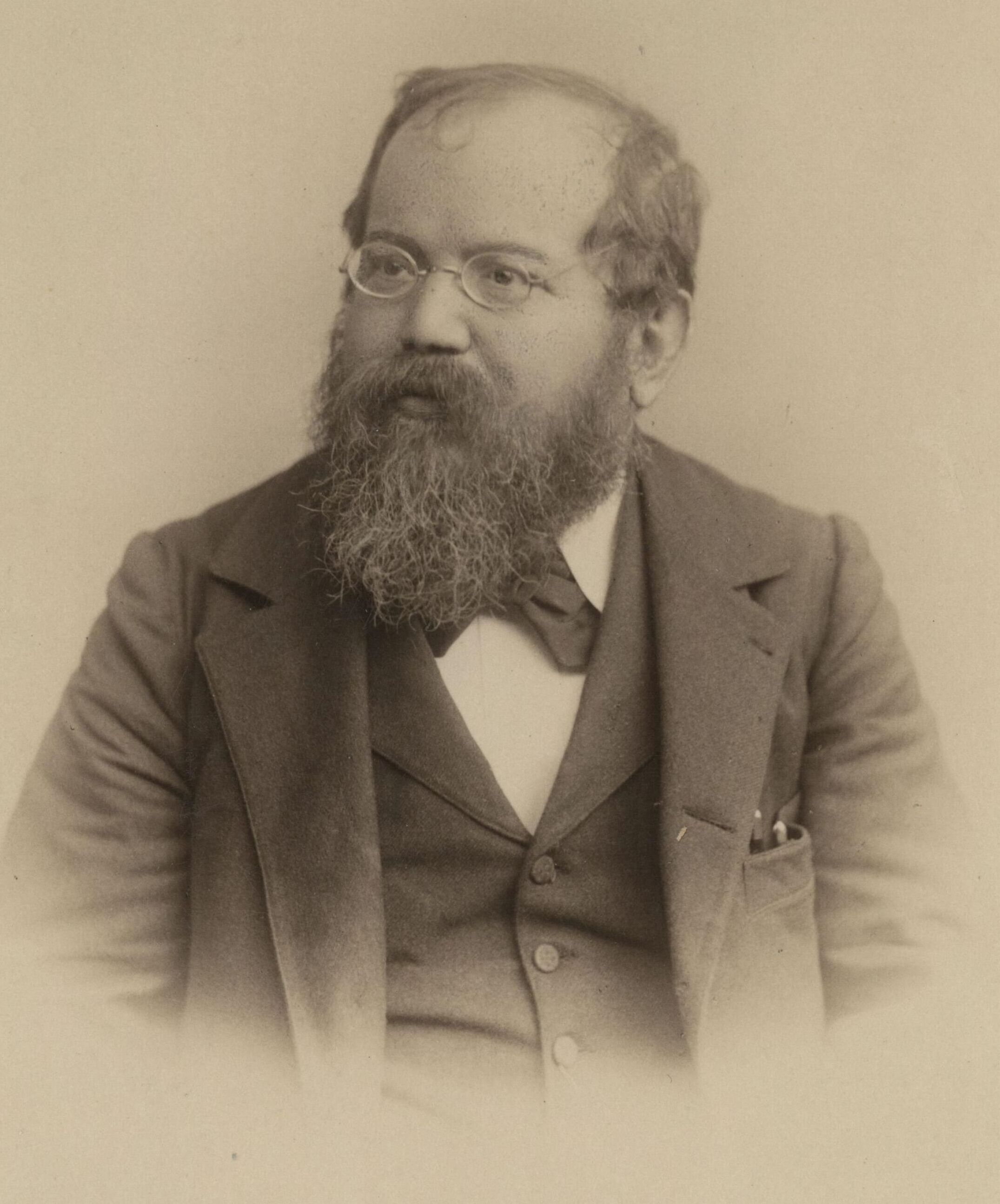
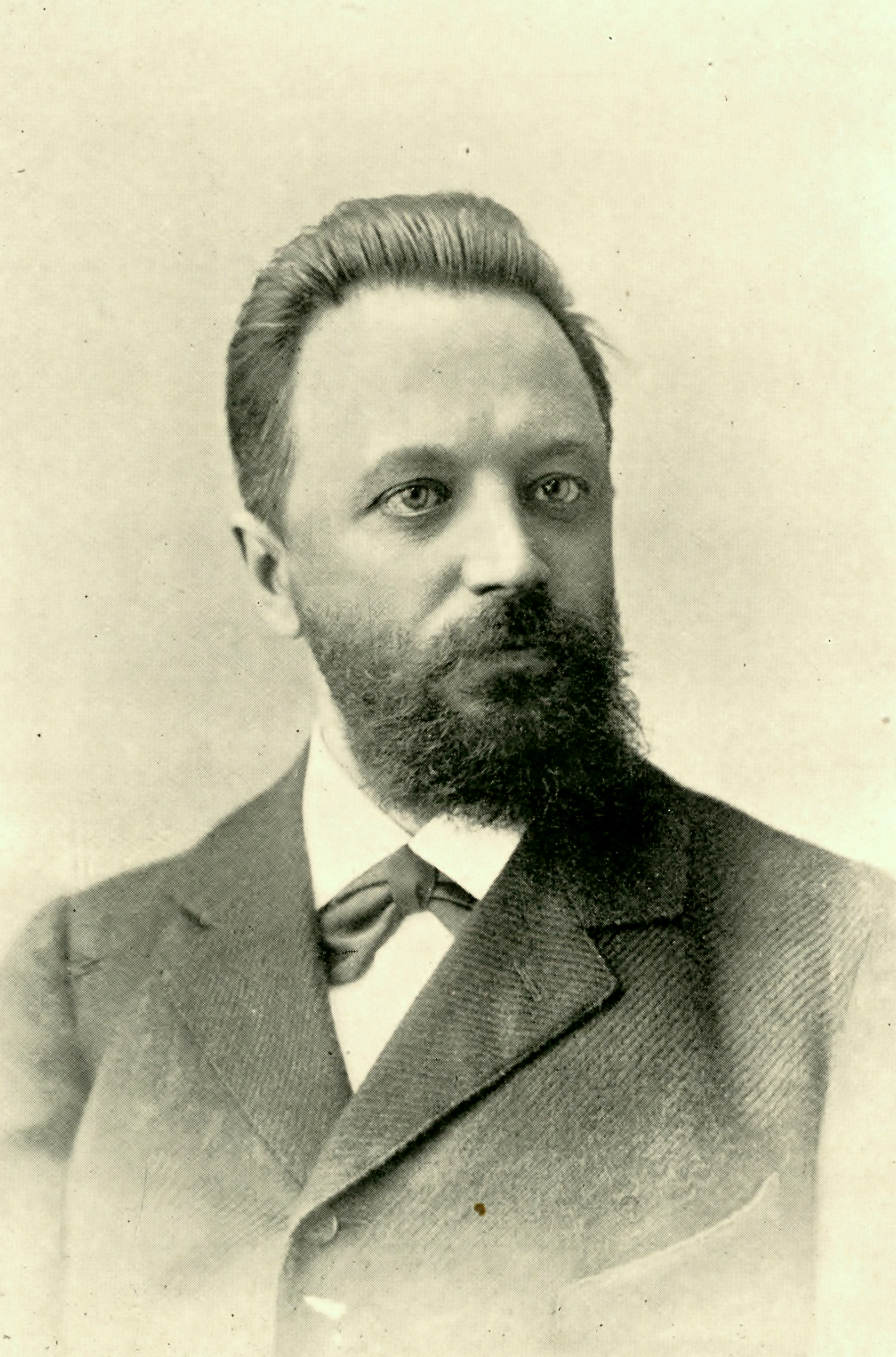
	Wilheilm Steinitz	Mikhail Chigorin
	(United States) Wilhelm Steinitz	(Russian Empire) Mikhail Chigorin
12½	Scores	10½
	Born 14 May 1836; 55 years old	Born 12 November 1850; 41 years old

The fourth World Chess Championship was held in Havana from 1 January to 28 February 1892. Defending champion William Steinitz narrowly defeated challenger Mikhail Chigorin. This was Steinitz' fourth successive world championship match victory, and his second against Chigorin. He had previously defeated Johannes Zukertort in 1886, Chigorin in 1889 and Isidor Gunsberg in 1891.

Following their world championship match in 1889, and their Evans Gambit cable match in 1890–91, the championship got underway at the beginning of 1892, beginning with a decisive win by Chigorin with the Evans Gambit. By the 19th game, Steinitz had a 1-point lead, but Chigorin brought the match to tied. Steinitz ended up reaching the 10-point winning threshold by winning the 22nd and 23rd games.

== Background ==
This was a rematch of the 1889 World chess championship, and held in the same city, Havana, then part of the Spanish Empire. In between the 1889 championship and the 1892 championship, Steinitz had written The Modern Chess Instructor. It included analysis of the Evans Gambit, which Chigorin had taken issue with. This led to Steinitz and Chigorin playing a two-game cable match (effectively a correspondence chess match) in 1890–91, with both games played from the starting position of the Evans Gambit, and the players having 3 days for each move. (Note: Some sources report 2 days.) It was billed as a battle between Chigorin's romantic style and Steinitz's more modern school. Chigorin won both games.

Before the match, Steinitz said:

I am guided by the position judgment in the main, and generally do not proceed with the examination of details until after my opponent has actually made his move. You see, I am an old master of the young school and Chigorin is a young master of the old school. If I don't commit an error, I fancy I shall win both games because I have a pawn to the good in either and according to the principles I laid down, I must win.

Each game began with these six moves:

1.e4 e5 2.Nf3 Nc6 3.Bc4 Bc5 4.b4 Bxb4 5.c3 Ba5 6.0-0 Qf6

The first game (Chigorin–Steinitz) continued;

7.d4 Nh6 8.Bg5 Qd6 9.d5 Nd8 10.Qa4 Bb6 11.Na3 c6 12.Be2 Bc7 13.Nc4 Qf8 14.d6 Bxd6 15.Nb6 Rb8 16.Qxa7 Ne6 17.Bc1 Ng8 18.Ba3 c5 19.Rad1 Nf6 20.Bc4 Bc7 21.Nd5 Bd6 22.Nh4 Nxd5 23.Nf5 g6 24.Nxd6+ Qxd6 25.Bxd5 Qc7 26.Bxe6 fxe6 27.Bxc5 Ra8 28.Qxa8 Qxc5 29.Qa4 Kd8 30.Rd2 Kc7 31.Rb1 Rd8 32.Rb5 Qc6 33.Qb4 d6 34.a4 Qe8 35.Rb6 Qf8 36.Qa5 d5 37.exd5 Kb8 38.d6 1–0

And the second game (Steinitz–Chigorin) continued;

7.dxc6 bxc6 8.Be2 h6 9.Nh3 Bc5 10.d3 0-0 11.Nc3 Nd5 12.Na4 Bd6 13.Ng1 f5 14.c3 Bd7 15.d4 e4 16.c4 Ne7 17.Nc3 Be6 18.b3 Bb4 19.Bb2 f4 20.Qc2 Qxd4 21.Kf1 f3 22.gxf3 exf3 23.Bxf3 Bf5 24.Ne4 Bxe4 25.Qe2 Bxf3 26.Qe6+ Kh7 27.Bxd4 Bxh1 28.Qh3 Nf5 29.Be5 Rae8 30.Bf4 Nd4 31.Qd3+ Be4 32.Qxd4 Rxf4 33.f3 Ref8 34.Qxa7 c5 35.Qc7 Nc6 36.a3 Rxf3+ 37.Nxf3 Rxf3+ 38.Kg1 Bd2 0–1

The cable match attracted public interest, and both the St. Petersburg Chess Society and Havana Chess Club made offers to have a world championship rematch between Steinitz and Chigorin. Steinitz accepted, and chose Havana again as the site of their match.

== Results ==
World Chess Championship Match 1892
	1	2	3	4	5	6	7	8	9	10	11	12	13	14	15	16	17	18	19	20	21	22	23	Points	Wins
Mikhail Chigorin (Russian Empire)	1	½	½	0	½	0	1	1	½	1	0	1	0	0	1	0	1	0	1	0	½	0	0	10½	8
William Steinitz (United States)	0	½	½	1	½	1	0	0	½	0	1	0	1	1	0	1	0	1	0	1	½	1	1	12½	10

The match was to last twenty games; the first player to score 10½ points or win ten games would be the champion. In the event of a 10–10 tie after 20 games the players would continue until one of them had won ten games. If it reached a score of nine wins each, the match would end in a draw and the defending champion Steinitz would retain the title. After twenty games the score was 10–10 with each player having eight wins, so the players continued until one had won ten games. Game 21 was drawn, but Steinitz won games 22 and 23 to win the match and retain the title.

In most of his games as White, Chigorin played the Evans Gambit.

== Games ==
=== Game 1: Chigorin–Steinitz, 1–0 ===
Evans Gambit (ECO C52)
1.e4 e5 2.Nf3 Nc6 3.Bc4 Bc5 4.b4 Bxb4 5.c3 Ba5 6.0-0 d6 7.d4 Bg4 8.Bb5 exd4 9.cxd4 Bd7 10.Bb2 Nce7 11.Bxd7+ Qxd7 12.Na3 Nh6 13.Nc4 Bb6 14.a4 c6 15.e5 d5 16.Nd6+ Kf8 17.Ba3 Kg8 18.Rb1 Nhf5 19.Nxf7 Kxf7 20.e6+ Kxe6 21.Ne5 Qc8 22.Re1 Kf6 23.Qh5 g6 24.Bxe7+ Kxe7 25.Nxg6+ Kf6 26.Nxh8 Bxd4 27.Rb3 Qd7 28.Rf3 Rxh8 29.g4 Rg8 30.Qh6+ Rg6 31.Rxf5+ 1–0

=== Game 2: Steinitz–Chigorin, ½–½ ===
Ruy Lopez, Berlin Defense (ECO C65)
1.e4 e5 2.Nf3 Nc6 3.Bb5 Nf6 4.d3 d6 5.c3 g6 6.Nbd2 Bg7 7.Nf1 0-0 8.Ne3 d5 9.Qc2 a6 10.Ba4 dxe4 11.dxe4 Nd7 12.0-0 Nc5 13.Bxc6 bxc6 14.Rd1 Qe7 15.b3 Ne6 16.Nc4 Nf4 17.Bxf4 exf4 18.Nd4 c5 19.Ne2 g5 20.Re1 Bb7 21.f3 Rae8 22.Rad1 g4 23.Nxf4 Qg5 24.Nd5 gxf3 25.Re3 f5 26.e5 f4 27.Rxf3 Bxe5 28.Rf2 f3 29.Nxe5 Rxe5 30.c4 Bxd5 31.cxd5 Rfe8 32.Rxf3 ½–½

=== Game 3: Chigorin–Steinitz, ½–½ ===
Evans Gambit (ECO C52)
1.e4 e5 2.Nf3 Nc6 3.Bc4 Bc5 4.b4 Bxb4 5.c3 Ba5 6.0-0 d6 7.d4 Bg4 8.Bb5 exd4 9.cxd4 Bd7 10.Bb2 Nf6 11.Na3 0-0 12.d5 Ne7 13.Bxf6 gxf6 14.Bxd7 Qxd7 15.Nc4 Bb6 16.Nh4 Kh8 17.Qf3 f5 18.Nxb6 axb6 19.exf5 Ra4 20.g3 c6 21.dxc6 bxc6 22.Rfe1 Nd5 23.Qh5 Rg8 24.Kh1 Nf6 25.Qf3 d5 26.Re2 d4 27.Rae1 Qd5 28.Re7 Kg7 29.Kg1 Qxf3 30.Nxf3 Nd5 31.Rd7 d3 32.Rd1 Re8 ½–½

=== Game 4: Steinitz–Chigorin, 1–0 ===
Ruy Lopez, Berlin Defense (ECO C65)
1.e4 e5 2.Nf3 Nc6 3.Bb5 Nf6 4.d3 d6 5.c3 g6 6.Nbd2 Bg7 7.Nf1 0-0 8.Ba4 Nd7 9.Ne3 Nc5 10.Bc2 Ne6 11.h4 Ne7 12.h5 d5 13.hxg6 fxg6 14.exd5 Nxd5 15.Nxd5 Qxd5 16.Bb3 Qc6 17.Qe2 Bd7 18.Be3 Kh8 19.0-0-0 Rae8 20.Qf1 a5 21.d4 exd4 22.Nxd4 Bxd4 23.Rxd4 Nxd4 24.Rxh7+ Kxh7 25.Qh1+ Kg7 26.Bh6+ Kf6 27.Qh4+ Ke5 28.Qxd4+ 1–0

=== Game 5: Chigorin–Steinitz, ½–½ ===
Evans Gambit (ECO C52)
1.e4 e5 2.Nf3 Nc6 3.Bc4 Bc5 4.b4 Bxb4 5.c3 Ba5 6.0-0 d6 7.d4 Bg4 8.Bb5 exd4 9.cxd4 Bd7 10.Bb2 Nf6 11.Na3 0-0 12.d5 Nb8 13.Rc1 Bxb5 14.Nxb5 Nbd7 15.Qc2 a6 16.Nbd4 g6 17.Ne2 Re8 18.Ng3 Rc8 19.Qd3 Qe7 20.Qa3 Bb6 21.Qc3 c6 22.Nd4 Bxd4 23.Qxd4 cxd5 24.exd5 Qe5 25.Qb4 Qxd5 26.Rcd1 Qxa2 27.Rxd6 Re6 28.Bxf6 Nxf6 29.Qxb7 Rce8 30.Rdd1 h5 31.Ra1 Qc4 32.Rfc1 Qf4 33.h3 h4 34.Nf1 Re2 35.Qf3 Qxf3 36.gxf3 Nd5 37.Rc4 Rb2 38.Rd1 Nb6 39.Rc6 a5 40.Ne3 a4 41.Rd3 Ra8 42.Ra3 Rd8 43.f4 Rb5 44.Kg2 Rd4 45.Kf3 Rbb4 46.f5 gxf5 47.Rf6 Rf4+ 48.Kg2 Rb2 49.Nd1 Rd2 50.Rxb6 Rxd1 51.Ra6 Rd2 52.Rf3 Rxf3 53.Kxf3 Rd3+ 54.Kf4 a3 55.Kxf5 ½–½

=== Game 6: Steinitz–Chigorin, 1–0 ===
Two Knights (ECO C59)
1.e4 e5 2.Nf3 Nc6 3.Bc4 Nf6 4.Ng5 d5 5.exd5 Na5 6.Bb5+ c6 7.dxc6 bxc6 8.Be2 h6 9.Nh3 Bc5 10.0-0 0-0 11.d3 Nd5 12.c4 Ne7 13.Kh1 Bxh3 14.gxh3 Nf5 15.f4 exf4 16.Bxf4 Ne3 17.Bxe3 Bxe3 18.Nc3 Rb8 19.Rb1 Qd7 20.b4 Nb7 21.b5 Nd8 22.Bg4 Qd4 23.Rb3 cxb5 24.Nxb5 Qc5 25.Rf5 Qe7 26.Nc3 Rxb3 27.axb3 Bd4 28.Nd5 Qd6 29.b4 g6 30.Rf1 Nc6 31.Qd2 Kg7 32.Bf3 Rd8 33.Bg2 Be5 34.Qe3 Rd7 35.Re1 f6 36.b5 Nd4 37.Qf2 Qb8 38.Be4 Ne6 39.Rf1 Rf7 40.Bxg6 Kxg6 41.Qf5+ Kg7 42.Qxe6 Qb7 43.d4 Bb8 44.Rg1+ Kf8 45.Qf5 Bd6 46.c5 Be7 47.c6 1–0

=== Game 7: Chigorin–Steinitz, 1–0 ===
Evans Gambit (ECO C52)
1.e4 e5 2.Nf3 Nc6 3.Bc4 Bc5 4.b4 Bxb4 5.c3 Ba5 6.0-0 d6 7.d4 Bd7 8.Qb3 Qf6 9.dxe5 dxe5 10.Rd1 h6 11.Ba3 Rd8 12.Nbd2 Bb6 13.Bd5 Na5 14.Qb4 c5 15.Qb2 Ne7 16.Nb3 Nxb3 17.Qxb3 0-0 18.Bxb7 Ng6 19.c4 Nf4 20.Qe3 Bg4 21.Bd5 Rfe8 22.Bb2 Rd6 23.Rd2 Nxg2 24.Kxg2 Bxf3+ 25.Qxf3 Qg5+ 26.Kh1 Qxd2 27.Qxf7+ Kh7 28.Rg1 1–0

=== Game 8: Steinitz–Chigorin, 0–1 ===
Two Knights (ECO C58)
1.e4 e5 2.Nf3 Nc6 3.Bc4 Nf6 4.Ng5 d5 5.exd5 Na5 6.Bb5+ c6 7.dxc6 bxc6 8.Bf1 h6 9.Nh3 Bc5 10.d3 Qb6 11.Qe2 Bg4 12.f3 Bxh3 13.gxh3 0-0-0 14.Nd2 Nd5 15.Nb3 Bb4+ 16.Bd2 Ne3 17.Bxb4 Qxb4+ 18.c3 Qh4+ 19.Kd2 Nac4+ 20.Kc1 Rxd3 21.Bg2 Rhd8 22.a4 Rd1+ 23.Rxd1 Rxd1+ 24.Qxd1 Nxd1 0–1

=== Game 9: Chigorin–Steinitz, ½–½ ===
Evans Gambit (ECO C52)
1.e4 e5 2.Nf3 Nc6 3.Bc4 Bc5 4.b4 Bxb4 5.c3 Ba5 6.0-0 d6 7.d4 Bd7 8.Qb3 Qf6 9.dxe5 dxe5 10.Rd1 h6 11.Bxf7+ Qxf7 12.Qxf7+ Kxf7 13.Rxd7+ Nge7 14.Kf1 Ke6 15.Rd3 Rad8 16.Ne1 Nc8 17.Ke2 Nd6 18.f3 b5 19.a3 Bb6 20.Nd2 Na5 21.Rb1 a6 22.Nc2 Ndb7 23.Rxd8 Rxd8 24.Nb4 Nc5 25.Nd5 Na4 26.Kd1 c6 27.Nxb6 Nxb6 28.Kc2 Nbc4 29.Nf1 Rd7 30.Ra1 Nb6 31.Be3 Na4 32.Re1 Nc4 33.Bc1 c5 34.h4 ½–½

=== Game 10: Steinitz–Chigorin, 0–1 ===
Two Knights (ECO C58)
1.e4 e5 2.Nf3 Nc6 3.Bc4 Nf6 4.Ng5 d5 5.exd5 Na5 6.Bb5+ c6 7.dxc6 bxc6 8.Bf1 h6 9.Nh3 Bc5 10.Qe2 0-0 11.c3 Bb6 12.d3 Nd5 13.Na3 Re8 14.Bd2 Bf5 15.0-0-0 Rb8 16.g4 Bg6 17.Bg2 Bc5 18.Nc2 Qb6 19.b4 Qb5 20.Be4 Qa4 21.Kb2 Re7 22.Bxg6 fxg6 23.Rb1 Bd6 24.Rhc1 Rb6 25.Ka1 Reb7 26.Rb2 c5 27.Qe4 Nf6 28.Qxg6 cxb4 29.cxb4 Nc6 30.g5 Ne7 0–1

=== Game 11: Chigorin–Steinitz, 0–1 ===
Ruy Lopez, Old Steinitz Defense (ECO C62)
1.e4 e5 2.Nf3 Nc6 3.Bb5 d6 4.Nc3 Bd7 5.d4 Nge7 6.Bg5 f6 7.Be3 Ng6 8.Qd2 a6 9.Ba4 b5 10.Bb3 Na5 11.0-0 c6 12.dxe5 fxe5 13.Bg5 Be7 14.Rfd1 Nb7 15.Bxe7 Qxe7 16.Ng5 Rf8 17.Nxh7 Rh8 18.Qg5 Nf4 19.Qxe7+ Kxe7 20.Ng5 Rh5 21.h4 Rxh4 22.g3 Rg4 23.Nf3 Rf8 24.Rd2 Nc5 25.Nh2 Rg6 26.Re1 Nh3+ 27.Kg2 Ng5 28.Rde2 Rh6 29.Re3 Rfh8 30.Nf1 Bh3+ 31.Kg1 Bg4 32.Kg2 b4 33.f4 Bh3+ 34.Kf2 Rf6 35.Ne2 Ngxe4+ 36.Kg1 Bxf1 37.fxe5 dxe5 38.Rxf1 Rfh6 39.Rf7+ Kd6 40.Rxg7 Rh1+ 41.Kg2 Nd2 42.Rg6+ Kc7 43.g4 R8h2+ 44.Kg3 Nf1+ 45.Kf3 Rh3+ 0–1

=== Game 12: Steinitz–Chigorin, 0–1 ===
Two Knights (ECO C59)
1.e4 e5 2.Nf3 Nc6 3.Bc4 Nf6 4.Ng5 d5 5.exd5 Na5 6.Bb5+ c6 7.dxc6 bxc6 8.Be2 h6 9.Nh3 Bc5 10.0-0 0-0 11.c3 Nb7 12.Qa4 Bxh3 13.gxh3 Qd6 14.d3 Nd5 15.Bf3 Bb6 16.Qh4 Bc7 17.Rd1 f5 18.Bxd5+ cxd5 19.Nd2 Rf6 20.Kf1 e4 21.d4 Rg6 22.Qh5 Rg5 23.Qh4 Qa6+ 24.c4 dxc4 25.f4 c3+ 26.Kf2 e3+ 0–1

=== Game 13: Chigorin–Steinitz, 0–1 ===
Evans Gambit (ECO C52)
1.e4 e5 2.Nf3 Nc6 3.Bc4 Bc5 4.b4 Bxb4 5.c3 Ba5 6.0-0 d6 7.d4 Bg4 8.Bb5 exd4 9.cxd4 Bd7 10.Bb2 Nf6 11.Na3 Nxe4 12.d5 Ne7 13.Qa4 Bc3 14.Rab1 Bxb2 15.Rxb2 Nc5 16.Qd4 0-0 17.Bc4 Nf5 18.Qd2 Qf6 19.Be2 Rfe8 20.Nb1 Re7 21.Nc3 Rae8 22.Bd1 Nh4 23.Rb4 Ng6 24.Bc2 a5 25.Rd4 Bf5 26.Ba4 Nxa4 27.Rxa4 b6 28.Nd4 Ne5 29.f4 Ng4 30.Nc6 Re3 31.Rd4 Qh4 32.h3 Nf6 33.Ne5 Rg3 34.Nf3 Qxh3 35.Rf2 Rxg2+ 36.Rxg2 Qxf3 37.Rf2 Qg3+ 38.Rg2 Re1+ 0–1

=== Game 14: Steinitz–Chigorin, 1–0 ===
Ruy Lopez, Berlin Defense (ECO C65)
1.e4 e5 2.Nf3 Nc6 3.Bb5 Nf6 4.d3 d6 5.c3 g6 6.Nbd2 Bg7 7.Nf1 0-0 8.Ba4 d5 9.Qe2 Qd6 10.Bc2 b6 11.Ng3 Ba6 12.0-0 dxe4 13.Nxe4 Nxe4 14.Qxe4 Bb7 15.Qh4 Ne7 16.Ng5 h6 17.Ne4 Qd7 18.Bxh6 Nf5 19.Qh3 Bxe4 20.dxe4 Bxh6 21.Rad1 Qc8 22.exf5 Kg7 23.f6+ Kh7 24.Rd7 Qe8 25.Qg4 Kh8 26.Be4 Rd8 27.Re7 Qb5 28.Bxg6 e4 29.Bf5 Qxb2 30.Qh5 Qd2 31.Rxf7 Rxf7 32.Qxf7 Qxf2+ 33.Kxf2 1–0

=== Game 15: Chigorin–Steinitz, 1–0 ===
Evans Gambit (ECO C52)
1.e4 e5 2.Nf3 Nc6 3.Bc4 Bc5 4.b4 Bxb4 5.c3 Ba5 6.0-0 d6 7.d4 Bg4 8.Qa4 exd4 9.cxd4 a6 10.Bd5 Bb6 11.Bxc6+ bxc6 12.Qxc6+ Bd7 13.Qc3 Ne7 14.Na3 0-0 15.Nc4 d5 16.exd5 Nxd5 17.Qc2 Qf6 18.Bg5 Qg6 19.Qd2 f6 20.Bh4 Bg4 21.Bg3 Rad8 22.Rfe1 Qh5 23.Qd3 Bxf3 24.gxf3 Kh8 25.a3 Ba7 26.Rab1 f5 27.Rb7 Bxd4 28.Qxd4 f4 29.Ne5 fxg3 30.hxg3 Nf4 31.Qc3 Nd5 32.Qc5 Qf5 33.f4 Qc8 34.Rb3 Nb6 35.Rc1 Na8 36.Qc4 Qf5 37.g4 Qf6 38.Kg2 Nb6 39.Qe4 Nd5 40.f5 Qg5 41.Rh1 Kg8 42.Nc6 Rd6 43.Kg3 Nf6 44.Qc4+ Kh8 45.Ne5 Nd5 46.Rh5 Qe7 47.Qxd5 1–0

=== Game 16: Steinitz–Chigorin, 1–0 ===
Ruy Lopez (ECO C77)
1.e4 e5 2.Nf3 Nc6 3.Bb5 a6 4.Ba4 Nf6 5.d3 Bc5 6.c3 b5 7.Bc2 d5 8.Qe2 0-0 9.Bg5 dxe4 10.dxe4 h6 11.Bh4 Qd6 12.0-0 Nh5 13.Bg3 Bg4 14.b4 Bb6 15.a4 bxa4 16.Nbd2 Qf6 17.Bxa4 Ne7 18.Qc4 Be6 19.Bxe5 Bxc4 20.Bxf6 Nxf6 21.Nxc4 Nxe4 22.Nxb6 cxb6 23.Rfe1 f5 24.Ne5 Rfc8 25.c4 Ra7 26.f3 Nf6 27.Bb3 Kf8 28.b5 a5 29.Red1 Re8 30.c5 bxc5 31.Rd6 Rb8 32.Rad1 Raa8 33.b6 a4 34.Bxa4 Kg8 35.Nc6 Nxc6 36.Bxc6 Ne8 37.b7 Ra7 38.Rd8 1–0

=== Game 17: Chigorin–Steinitz, 1–0 ===
Evans Gambit (ECO C52)
1.e4 e5 2.Nf3 Nc6 3.Bc4 Bc5 4.b4 Bxb4 5.c3 Ba5 6.0-0 d6 7.d4 Bg4 8.Qa4 Bxf3 9.gxf3 exd4 10.cxd4 a6 11.Bd5 Ne7 12.Bxc6+ Nxc6 13.d5 b5 14.Qa3 Nd4 15.Qxa5 Qf6 16.Qa3 Nc2 17.Qd3 Nxa1 18.Qe2 0-0 19.Bb2 Qh6 20.Bxa1 Rae8 21.Kh1 f5 22.Rg1 Rf7 23.Nd2 Qh5 24.Qd3 b4 25.Rg3 a5 26.Kg2 Qh4 27.exf5 a4 28.Ne4 Rb8 29.Ng5 Rbf8 30.Qe3 Rxf5 31.Qe6+ Kh8 32.Bxg7+ Kxg7 33.Qe7+ Kg6 34.Ne6+ Qxg3+ 35.hxg3 R8f7 36.Qe8 b3 37.axb3 axb3 38.g4 Re5 39.Qg8+ 1–0

=== Game 18: Steinitz–Chigorin, 1–0 ===
Reti Opening (ECO A04)
1.Nf3 f5 2.d4 e6 3.c4 Nf6 4.Nc3 Be7 5.d5 exd5 6.cxd5 0-0 7.g3 d6 8.Bg2 Nbd7 9.0-0 Ne5 10.Nd4 Ng6 11.Qc2 Ne8 12.f4 Bf6 13.Be3 Bd7 14.Bf2 Ne7 15.Rae1 Bxd4 16.Bxd4 c6 17.dxc6 Bxc6 18.e4 Qd7 19.Nd5 Nxd5 20.exd5 Bb5 21.Rf3 Nc7 22.Rc3 Na6 23.Rce3 Rfe8 24.Re6 Nc7 25.Qxf5 Nxe6 26.dxe6 Qe7 27.Qxb5 Rac8 28.Qxb7 Rc7 29.Qe4 Rec8 30.Bc3 Rc4 31.Qd3 a5 32.Rd1 Qa7+ 33.Kh1 R4c7 34.Qxd6 h5 35.Be4 Re8 36.Qe5 Rc5 37.Rd5 Rxd5 38.Bxd5 Re7 39.Qxg7+ 1–0

=== Game 19: Chigorin–Steinitz, 1–0 ===
Scotch Game (ECO C45)
1.e4 e5 2.Nf3 Nc6 3.d4 exd4 4.Nxd4 Qh4 5.Nb5 Qxe4+ 6.Be3 Kd8 7.N1c3 Qe5 8.Nd5 Nf6 9.Nbxc7 Bd6 10.f4 Qe4 11.Bd3 Qxg2 12.Rg1 Qxh2 13.Qf3 Nxd5 14.Nxd5 Qh6 15.0-0-0 f5 16.Bxf5 g6 17.Nf6 Qf8 18.Bxd7 Qxf6 19.Bxc6 Kc7 20.Be4 Rf8 21.Rgf1 Bd7 22.Rd3 Bc6 23.Bxc6 bxc6 24.Bd2 Bc5 25.Bc3 Qf7 26.Be5+ Kb7 27.Rfd1 Qc4 28.Rc3 Qb5 29.Rb3 Bb4 30.Rd7+ Kb6 31.Bc7+ Ka6 32.Rxb4 1–0

=== Game 20: Steinitz–Chigorin, 1–0 ===
Queen's Pawn Game (ECO D05)
1.Nf3 d5 2.d4 Nf6 3.e3 e6 4.c4 Be7 5.Nc3 Nbd7 6.c5 c6 7.b4 0-0 8.Bb2 Qc7 9.Be2 Ne8 10.0-0 f5 11.Qc2 Nef6 12.a4 Ne4 13.b5 Rf6 14.a5 Nxc3 15.Bxc3 a6 16.bxa6 bxa6 17.Rfb1 Rf8 18.Rb2 Bb7 19.Rab1 Rfb8 20.Ne1 Bc8 21.Nd3 Rxb2 22.Rxb2 Bf6 23.Qa4 Kf7 24.Qa3 Bd8 25.Bd1 Rb8 26.Rb6 Nxb6 27.cxb6 Qb7 28.Ne5+ Kg8 29.Ba4 Qe7 30.Bb4 Qf6 31.Qc3 h6 32.Bd6 Rxb6 33.axb6 Bxb6 34.Qxc6 Qd8 35.Bc5 Bc7 36.Ng6 Kh7 37.Be7 Bd7 38.Bxd8 Bxc6 39.Bxc6 Bxd8 40.Nf8+ Kg8 41.Nxe6 1–0

=== Game 21: Chigorin–Steinitz, ½–½ ===
Vienna Game (ECO C28)
1.e4 e5 2.Nc3 Nc6 3.f4 exf4 4.d4 Qh4+ 5.Ke2 Nf6 6.Nf3 Qg4 7.d5 Ne5 8.h3 Qh5 9.Bxf4 Nxf3 10.gxf3 d6 11.Kd2 Qh4 12.Be3 Be7 13.Nb5 Bd8 14.Nxa7 Bd7 15.Nb5 0-0 16.Nc3 Nh5 17.Qe1 Ng3 18.Rg1 Nxf1+ 19.Qxf1 f5 20.Qg2 Rf7 21.Rh1 Bf6 22.Nd1 Re8 23.f4 Rxe4 24.c3 Rfe7 25.Re1 Rxf4 26.Bf2 Qh5 27.Be3 Qh4 28.Bf2 Qg5 29.Qxg5 Bxg5 30.Be3 Rfe4 31.Bxg5 Rxe1 32.Bxe7 Rxe7 33.Nf2 Kf7 34.c4 g5 35.a4 f4 36.a5 Bc8 37.b4 f3 38.Re1 Rxe1 39.Kxe1 h5 40.Kd2 g4 41.h4 Bf5 42.Nh1 Ke7 43.Ng3 Bg6 44.Ke3 Kd7 45.b5 Kc8 46.Kd4 Kb8 47.Ke3 ½–½

=== Game 22: Steinitz–Chigorin, 1–0 ===
Queen's Gambit Declined (ECO D55)
1.Nf3 d5 2.d4 e6 3.c4 Nf6 4.Nc3 Be7 5.Bg5 0-0 6.e3 b6 7.Rc1 Bb7 8.Be2 Nbd7 9.cxd5 Nxd5 10.Nxd5 Bxd5 11.Bxe7 Qxe7 12.Rxc7 Qd6 13.Rc3 Bxa2 14.e4 Qb4 15.Qa1 Bb3 16.Nd2 Bc2 17.Rc4 Qd6 18.Rxc2 Qxd4 19.0-0 Nc5 20.Bf3 e5 21.Rd1 Qb4 22.Qa3 Qb5 23.Nc4 Ne6 24.Rd5 Qc6 25.Rc3 Nf4 26.Rd6 Qe8 27.g3 Nh3+ 28.Kg2 Ng5 29.h4 Ne6 30.Nxe5 Nc5 31.Rd5 f6 32.b4 Na4 33.Rc7 fxe5 34.Rdd7 Qg6 35.Rxg7+ Qxg7 36.Rxg7+ Kxg7 37.Qxa4 Rf7 38.Bg4 Rd8 39.Qb5 Re7 40.Qc6 Rf8 41.Bf5 Rf6 42.Qd5 h5 43.Qd8 Ref7 44.Qe8 Rxf5 45.exf5 Rxf5 46.Qe7+ Rf7 47.Qxe5+ Kg6 48.Qg5+ Kh7 49.Qxh5+ 1–0

=== Game 23: Chigorin–Steinitz, 0–1 ===
King's Gambit Accepted (ECO C34)
1.e4 e5 2.f4 exf4 3.Nf3 Nf6 4.e5 Nh5 5.Be2 g6 6.d4 Bg7 7.0-0 d6 8.Nc3 0-0 9.Ne1 dxe5 10.Bxh5 gxh5 11.dxe5 Qxd1 12.Nxd1 Nc6 13.Bxf4 Bf5 14.Ne3 Be4 15.Nf3 Rfe8 16.Ng5 Bg6 17.Nd5 Bxe5 18.Nxc7 Bxc7 19.Bxc7 Rac8 20.Bg3 Nd4 21.c3 Ne2+ 22.Kf2 h4 23.Bd6 Nd4 24.cxd4 Rc2+ 25.Kg1 Ree2 26.Rae1 Rxg2+ 27.Kh1 Kg7 28.Re8 f5 29.Ne6+ Kf6 30.Re7 Rge2 31.d5 Rcd2 32.Bb4 Rxh2+ 0–1

== Decisive mistakes ==
With the match tied at 8–8 after 21 games, Steinitz won the match by capitalising on blunders made by Chigorin in the next two games.

Steinitz–Chigorin, game 22

Position: a8 black rook, d8 black queen, f8 black rook, g8 black king, a7 black pawn, b7 black bishop, c7 black pawn, d7 black knight, e7 black bishop, f7 black pawn, g7 black pawn, h7 black pawn, b6 black pawn, e6 black pawn, f6 black knight, d5 black pawn, g5 white bishop, c4 white pawn, d4 white pawn, c3 white knight, e3 white pawn, f3 white knight, a2 white pawn, b2 white pawn, e2 white bishop, f2 white pawn, g2 white pawn, h2 white pawn, c1 white rook, d1 white queen, e1 white king, h1 white rook

Chigorin errs with 9.cxd5 Nxd5?

In game 22, Chigorin blundered on move 9, losing a pawn and ultimately the game (see diagram). Playing Black, Chigorin adopted the variation of the Queen's Gambit Declined later known as the Tartakower Defense. 9. cxd5 Nxd5? An elementary error that loses a pawn. 10. Nxd5 Bxd5 11. Bxe7 Qxe7 12. Rxc7 Qd6 13. Rc3 Bxa2? When making his 9th move Chigorin may have expected this capture would regain the pawn, but after 14. e4 the bishop was trapped. Play continued 14... Qb4 15. Qa1 Bb3 16. Nd2 Bc2 17. Rc4 Qd6 18. Rxc2 Qxd4. Down a piece for a pawn, Chigorin's position was lost, though he played on until resigning after White's 49th move.

Chigorin–Steinitz, game 23

Position: a7 black pawn, b7 black pawn, e7 white rook, h7 black pawn, d6 white bishop, e6 white knight, f6 black king, g6 black bishop, d5 white pawn, f5 black pawn, h4 black pawn, a2 white pawn, b2 white pawn, d2 black rook, e2 black rook, h2 white pawn, f1 white rook, h1 white king

32.Bb4?? loses the match.

As White in game 23, Chigorin was behind eight wins to nine and played the aggressive King's Gambit. Steinitz defended poorly and was in a hopeless endgame (see diagram). A piece up, Chigorin should have won after 32.Rxb7 (32...Rxd5? 33.Nf4 forks the black rooks). Instead the game and match ended suddenly when Chigorin blundered with 32. Bb4?? Rxh2+ White resigns, as Black will mate on the next move (33.Kg1 Rdg2#). By missing a mate in 2, this is regarded as one of the worst-ever blunders in World Championship play. The Cuban press stated at the time:

It is unlikely that we will ever forget that decisive moment. At the 23rd game more than a thousand people were present, and all were discussing Chigorin’s brilliant play. At any minute, Steinitz’s resignation was expected. Suddenly there was an extraordinary commotion: the spectators stood up, and they all saw how the Russian master, nervy, with a changed face, was holding his head in his hands: he had moved away the bishop that was defending him against mate. "What a pity!" repeated hundreds of voices. What a vexatious and terrible ending to a wonderful match for the world championship! Chigorin can feel proud: never was Steinitz so close to defeat as now.
