= World Chess Championship 1890–1891 =

Chess match between Wilheilm Steinitz and Isidor Gunsberg

| | Defending champion | Challenger |
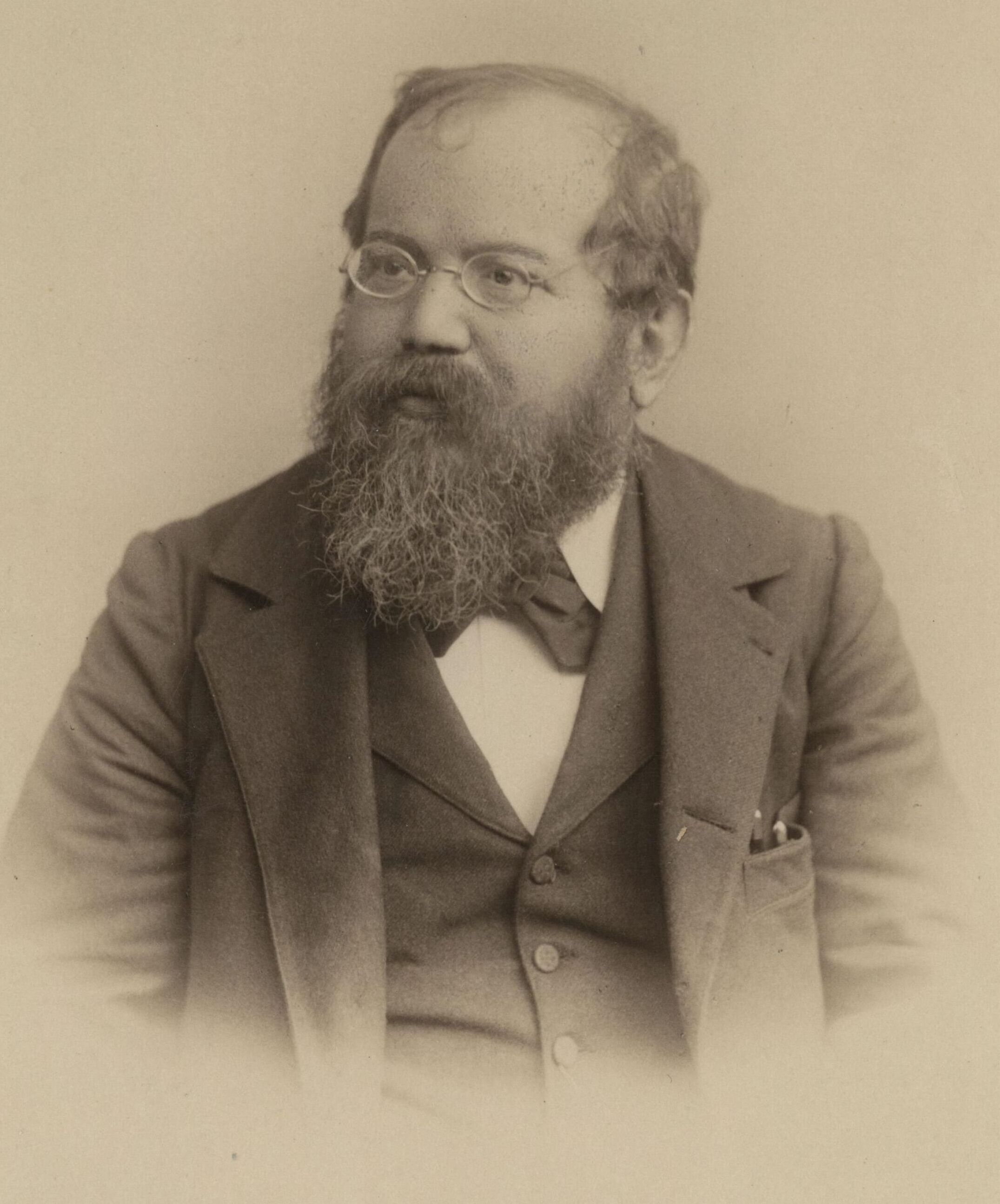
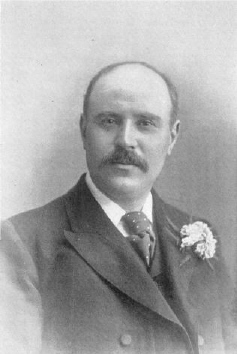
| | Wilheilm Steinitz | Isidor Gunsberg |
| | (United States) Wilhelm Steinitz | (Austria-Hungary) Isidor Gunsberg |
| 10½ | Scores | 8½ |
| | Born 14 May 1836; 54 years old | Born 1 November 1854; 36 years old |

The third World Chess Championship was held in New York City from 9 December 1890 to 22 January 1891. Holder Wilhelm Steinitz (known as William Steinitz since his naturalisation as an American citizen) narrowly defeated his Hungarian challenger, Isidor Gunsberg.

Despite coming in 3rd place in the American Chess Congress's tournament held in 1889, the tied first-place finishers Mikhail Chigorin and Max Weiss refused to challenge the title. Steinitz accepted Gunsberg's challenge in 1890, and they played in New York. Though Steinitz won their second game, by game 5 Gunsberg had taken the lead. Gunsberg managed to be just one game behind Steinitz after winning Games 12 and 16, but Steinitz strengthened his lead by winning game 18, and then drew Game 19 to win 10½ to 8½ points. Gunsberg favoured the Evans Gambit with the white pieces, and held his own, ended up winning 4 games against Steinitz, who would continue to hold the title of World Champion until his 1894 match against Emanuel Lasker.

Gunsberg is agreed to have reached the peak of his chess career in the years leading up to the World Championship, following which his wife Jane died of tuberculosis, and though he continued to give lectures and write about chess, his skill level sharply dropped off.

== Background ==
In 1887 the American Chess Congress started work on drawing up regulations for the future conduct of world championship contests. Steinitz actively supported this endeavor, as he thought he was becoming too old to remain world champion – he wrote in his own magazine "I know I am not fit to be the champion, and I am not likely to bear that title for ever."

The American Chess Congress's final proposal was that the winner of a tournament to be held in New York in 1889 should be regarded as world champion for the time being, but must be prepared to face a challenge from the second or third placed competitor within a month. Steinitz wrote that he would not play in the tournament and would not challenge the winner unless the second and third placed competitors failed to do so. The tournament was duly played to select Steinitz's challenger for the world championship, but the outcome was not quite as planned: Mikhail Chigorin and Max Weiss tied for first place; their play-off resulted in four draws, though neither player wished to challenge for the world champion title - Weiss then wanted to get back to his work for the Rothschild Bank, conceding the title to Chigorin, who in turn had played and lost to Steinitz in the world championship the previous year.

However, the third prize-winner Isidor Gunsberg was prepared to play for the title. He practiced before the match by organising a first-to-10 match against Chigorin, a precursor to the modern Candidates Tournament. He issued his challenge to Steinitz following the match, which ended with 11½ points each.

| Player | 1 | 2 | 3 | 4 | 5 | 6 | 7 | 8 | 9 | 10 | 11 | 12 | 13 | 14 | 15 | 16 | 17 | 18 | 19 | 20 | 21 | 22 | 23 | Wins |
|---|---|---|---|---|---|---|---|---|---|---|---|---|---|---|---|---|---|---|---|---|---|---|---|---|
| Isidor Gunsberg (Austria-Hungary) | 0 | 0 | 1 | ½ | 1 | 0 | ½ | 1 | 1 | 1 | 0 | 1 | 0 | 1 | ½ | 0 | ½ | 0 | ½ | 0 | 1 | 0 | 1 | 9 |
| Mikhail Chigorin (Russian Empire) | 1 | 1 | 0 | ½ | 0 | 1 | ½ | 0 | 0 | 0 | 1 | 0 | 1 | 0 | ½ | 1 | ½ | 1 | ½ | 1 | 0 | 1 | 0 | 9 |

The world championship was played in New York in 1890 and ended in a 10½–8½ victory for Steinitz. The American Chess Congress's experiment was not repeated, and Steinitz's last three matches were private arrangements between the players.

== Results ==
The winner would be first to 10 wins (draws not counting), or most wins after 20 games. A draw would be declared if the score reached 9 wins each.

World Chess Championship 1891
| Player | 1 | 2 | 3 | 4 | 5 | 6 | 7 | 8 | 9 | 10 | 11 | 12 | 13 | 14 | 15 | 16 | 17 | 18 | 19 | Wins |
|---|---|---|---|---|---|---|---|---|---|---|---|---|---|---|---|---|---|---|---|---|
| William Steinitz (United States) | ½ | 1 | ½ | 0 | 0 | 1 | 1 | ½ | ½ | 1 | ½ | 0 | 1 | ½ | ½ | 0 | ½ | 1 | ½ | 6 |
| Isidor Gunsberg (Austria-Hungary) | ½ | 0 | ½ | 1 | 1 | 0 | 0 | ½ | ½ | 0 | ½ | 1 | 0 | ½ | ½ | 1 | ½ | 0 | ½ | 4 |

Steinitz led by 2 with only one game left, and so was declared the winner.

== Games ==
=== Game 1: Steinitz–Gunsberg, ½–½ ===
Steinitz introduced what was at the time a novelty, with 4.f3, which he would go on to play against Emanuel Lasker in the 1894 world chess championship. Though the opening was fairly even, Steinitz missed a chance to capitalise on a potential lead on the 11th move. He could've played 11.Nd3, winning a tempo on the black rook. At this point, the game was adjourned until 7 o'clock, and shortly after regrouping Steinitz offered a draw, which was accepted by Gunsberg.

Queen's Gambit Declined, Queen's Knight Variation (ECO D35)
1.d4 d5 2.c4 e6 3.Nc3 Nf6 4.f3 Nc6 5.e3 Be7 6.Nh3 0-0 7.Nf2 Re8 8.Be2 Bb4 9.Bd2 e5 10.dxe5 Rxe5 11.cxd5 Nxd5 12.e4 Nxc3 13.bxc3 Ba5 14.Qc2 Re8 15.0-0 Bb6 16.Kh1 Qe7 17.Nd3 Ne5 18.Nxe5 Qxe5 19.Bd3 Rd8 20.Rad1 Be6 21.Bc1 Qa5 22.c4 Bd4 23.Bd2 Qh5 24.Bc1 c6 25.Be2 Qa5 ½–½

=== Game 2: Gunsberg–Steinitz, 0–1 ===
Gunsberg–Steinitz, game 2

Position: e8 black rook, f8 black rook, g8 black king, a7 black pawn, b7 black pawn, c7 black pawn, g7 black pawn, h7 black pawn, d6 black pawn, g6 black knight, d5 white pawn, e5 black pawn, f5 black queen, g5 black bishop, a4 black knight, b4 white pawn, c4 white pawn, g3 white pawn, a2 white pawn, c2 white knight, d2 white bishop, e2 white queen, f2 white pawn, h2 white pawn, c1 white rook, e1 white knight, f1 white rook, g1 white king

Position after 18.g3??. This allowed Steinitz to win the exchange with Nc3, because the queen is either forced to leave the defence of the bishop on d2 (leading to greater material loss), or the bishop must take the knight, which is what happened in the game. This bishop was pinned to the rook, leading the black bishop to play Bxc1.

Steinitz led out of the opening, especially after Gunsberg made a positional error with 14.c4?! (failing to centralise his c2-knight to hamper Black's progress), and had a commanding advantage after 17...Bg5 18.g3??, where Gunsberg failed to spot a pin tactic, and went down the exchange, after 18...Nc3.

Ruy Lopez, Steinitz Defense (ECO C62)
1.e4 e5 2.Nf3 Nc6 3.Bb5 d6 4.c3 Bd7 5.0-0 Nge7 6.d4 Ng6 7.d5 Nb8 8.Bxd7+ Nxd7 9.Na3 Be7 10.Nc2 Nc5 11.Qe2 Qd7 12.b4 Na4 13.Bd2 0-0 14.c4 f5 15.exf5 Qxf5 16.Rac1 Rae8 17.Nfe1 Bg5 18.g3 Nc3 19.Bxc3 Bxc1 20.Ng2 Qf3 21.Qxf3 Rxf3 22.Nge3 Bxe3 23.Nxe3 Ref8 24.Kg2 c6 25.Bb2 cxd5 26.Nxd5 Rd3 27.Bc1 b5 28.Ne3 bxc4 29.Nxc4 Rd4 30.Ne3 Rxb4 31.Rd1 Rb1 32.Ba3 Rxd1 33.Nxd1 Rd8 34.f3 d5 35.Nc3 d4 36.Ne4 Rb8 37.h4 h5 38.Kf2 Rb1 39.Bd6 Rb2+ 0–1

=== Game 3: Steinitz–Gunsberg, ½–½ ===
Queen's Gambit Declined, Semi-Slav Defense (ECO D31)
1.d4 d5 2.c4 e6 3.Nc3 c6 4.e3 Nf6 5.f3 Bb4 6.Nh3 Nbd7 7.Nf4 0-0 8.Be2 dxc4 9.Bxc4 e5 10.Nfe2 exd4 11.exd4 Nb6 12.Bb3 Bf5 13.Bg5 Be7 14.0-0 Nfd5 15.Bxe7 Nxe7 16.Ng3 Bg6 17.Nce4 Nbd5 18.Qd2 b6 19.Rae1 Qd7 20.Re2 Rad8 21.Rfe1 Nf5 22.Nc3 Nxg3 23.hxg3 Nxc3 24.bxc3 Rfe8 25.Qf4 Rxe2 26.Rxe2 Kf8 27.Kf2 Qd6 ½–½

=== Game 4: Gunsberg–Steinitz, 1–0 ===
Giuoco Piano, Giuoco Pianissimo (ECO C50)
1.e4 e5 2.Nf3 Nc6 3.Bc4 Bc5 4.d3 Nf6 5.Be3 Bxe3 6.fxe3 d6 7.0-0 Na5 8.Bb5+ c6 9.Ba4 Qb6 10.Qd2 Ng4 11.Re1 Qa6 12.c3 f6 13.Bc2 c5 14.b4 cxb4 15.cxb4 Nc6 16.Bb3 Qb6 17.a3 Bd7 18.Nc3 Ne7 19.h3 Nh6 20. d4 Rd8 21.Rf1 Rf8 22.Qf2 Rc8 23.Rac1 Qa6 24.a4 Qb6 25.b5 Qa5 26.Qb2 Nf7 27.Nd2 exd4 28.exd4 Qb6 29.Ne2 d5 30.exd5 Nd6 31.Qa3 Kd8 32.a5 Nxb5 33.Qxe7+ Kxe7 34.axb6 axb6 35.Nc4 Ra8 36.Ra1 Nd6 37.Nxb6 Rxa1 38.Rxa1 Bb5 39.Nf4 Kf7 40.Ne6 Re8 41.Ba4 Bxa4 42.Rxa4 g6 43.Nc4 Nf5 44.Rb4 Re7 45.g4 Ng3 46.Nd6+ Kg8 47.Nxb7 Rd7 48.Nbc5 Rxd5 49.Kf2 Nf5 50.gxf5 Rxf5+ 51.Kg3 h5 52.Rb7 g5 53.Ne4 Kh8 54.Rg7 h4+ 55.Kg2 Ra5 56.Nxf6 Ra2+ 57.Kg1 1–0

=== Game 5: Steinitz–Gunsberg, 0–1 ===
Queen's Gambit Accepted, Old Variation (ECO D20)
1.d4 d5 2.c4 dxc4 3.e3 e5 4.dxe5 Qxd1+ 5.Kxd1 Nc6 6.Bxc4 Nxe5 7.Bb5+ c6 8.Be2 Be6 9.Nc3 0-0-0+ 10.Kc2 Nf6 11.Nf3 Neg4 12.Rf1 Bf5+ 13.Kb3 Nd7 14.e4 Nc5+ 15.Kc2 Nxe4 16.Nh4 Nxc3+ 17.Kxc3 Be6 18.f4 Nf6 19.f5 Bd5 20.g4 Be7 21.Kc2 Be4+ 22.Kb3 Nd7 23.g5 f6 24.Bg4 Nc5+ 25.Ka3 Rd3+ 26.b3 Na4+ 27.Kxa4 Rd4+ 28.b4 Rxb4+ 0–1

=== Game 6: Gunsberg–Steinitz, 0–1 ===
During this game, Gunsberg ran out of time, though Steinitz refused to count it as a win, instead reaching a forced checkmate in 3 after 41.. Qh1+.

Queen's Pawn Opening (ECO D00)
1.d4 d5 2.e3 e6 3.Bd3 c5 4.b3 Nc6 5.Nf3 Nf6 6.0-0 Bd7 7.Bb2 Rc8 8.c3 Bd6 9.Nbd2 e5 10.dxe5 Nxe5 11.Nxe5 Bxe5 12.Nf3 Bb8 13.h3 c4 14.Bc2 0-0 15.Qd4 Re8 16.Rad1 b5 17.b4 Qc7 18.Rfe1 Re7 19.Kf1 Rce8 20.Qh4 Qd6 21.Rd4 Qc6 22.Red1 Be5 23.Rxd5 Bb8 24.a4 a6 25.a5 h6 26.R5d4 Qb7 27.Ne1 Be5 28.R4d2 Bc7 29.Re2 Re5 30.f3 Rxe3 31.Rxe3Rxe3 32.Bc1 Re5 33.Qf2 Qc6 34.Be3 Re8 35.Qd2 Qe6 36.Bd4 Nh5 37.Bf2 Bc6 38.Bb1 Qe5 39.Nc2 Bxf3 40.gxf3 Qh2 41.Qd7 Qh1+ 42.Bg1 Qxf3+ 43.Bf2 Ng3+ 0–1

=== Game 7: Steinitz–Gunsberg, 1–0 ===
Queen's Gambit Accepted (ECO D26)
1.d4 d5 2.c4 dxc4 3.Nf3 Nf6 4.e3 e6 5.Bxc4 Bb4+ 6.Nc3 0-0 7.0-0 b6 8.Ne5 Bb7 9.Qb3 Bxc3 10.bxc3 Bd5 11.Bxd5 exd5 12.Ba3 Re8 13.c4 c5 14.Rac1 Ne4 15.Rfd1 cxd4 16.exd4 f6 17.cxd5 fxe5 18.d6+ Kh8 19.Qd5 Nxf2 20.Rd2 Nd7 21.Rxf2 Nf6 22.Rxf6 gxf6 23.d7 Rg8 24.dxe5 Rg5 25.Qxa8 Qxa8 26.Rc8+ Rg8 27.Rxa8 Rxa8 28.e6 1–0

=== Game 8: Gunsberg–Steinitz, ½–½ ===
Giuoco Piano, Giuoco Pianissimo (ECO C50)
1.e4 e5 2.Nf3 Nc6 3.Bc4 Bc5 4.d3 Nf6 5.c3 d6 6.Be3 Bxe3 7.fxe3 Qe7 8.0-0 Nd8 9.Nbd2 Ne6 10.d4 Ng4 11.Qe1 f6 12.Nh4 Nh6 13.Nf5 Nxf5 14.exf5 Nf8 15.e4 Nd7 16.Qh4 Nb6 17.Qh5+ Kd8 18.Bb3 Bd7 19.Rae1 c6 20.Re3 Kc7 21.Rg3 Raf8 22.dxe5 dxe5 23.Qe2 g5 24.Rd3 Bc8 25.Rd1 Rd8 26.Nf1 Nd7 27.Bc2 Nc5 28.Rxd8 Rxd8 29.Rxd8 Kxd8 30.b4 Nd7 31.Bb3 a5 32.a3 axb4 33.axb4 Qd6 34.Ne3 b5 35.Kf2 Kc7 36.Qd1 ½–½

=== Game 9: Steinitz–Gunsberg, ½–½ ===
Queen's Pawn Opening, Krause Variation (ECO C52)
1.Nf3 Nf6 2.d4 e6 3.e3 c5 4.c4 d5 5.dxc5 Bxc5 6.Nc3 Bb4 7.Bd2 dxc4 8.Bxc4 0-0 9.0-0 Nc6 10.Qe2 Qe7 11.e4 Bxc3 12.Bxc3 e5 13.Qe3 Be6 14.Be2 Ng4 15.Qc1 Rac8 16.h3 Nh6 17.Qe3 f6 18.a3 Nf7 19.b4 a6 20.a4 Nxb4 21.Bxb4 Qxb4 22.Rfb1 Qe7 23.Rb6 Rc7 24.Rab1 Rfc8 25.Ne1 Nd8 26.Nd3 Qa3 27.Kh2 Rd7 28.Rxe6 Nxe6 29.Bg4 Re8 30.Bxe6+ Rxe6 31.Nc5 Qxe3 32.fxe3 Ree7 33.Nxd7 Rxd7 34.Kg3 Kf7 35.a5 Kg6 36.Kf3 Rc7 37.Rb2 Rc5 38.Ra2 Rb5 39.Ke2 Kf7 40.Kf3 Ke6 41.h4 h5 42.Ra1 g6 43.g4 hxg4+ 44.Kxg4 Rb4 45.Kf3 f5 46.exf5+ Kxf5 47.Rh1 Rb5 48.e4+ Kf6 49.Rd1 Rxa5 50.Rd6+ Kg7 51.Rd7+ Kh6 52.Rxb7 Ra3+ 53.Kf2 Ra5 54.Rb6 Kh5 55.Rc6 Ra4 56.Kf3 Ra3+ 57.Kf2 Kh6 58.Re6 Ra5 59.Kg3 Kg7 60.Kg4 Kf7 61.Rb6 Ra1 62.Rb7+ Kf6 63.Rb6+ Kg7 64.Re6 a5 65.Rxe5 a4 66.Ra5 a3 67.Kg5 a2 68.Ra7+ Kf8 69.Ra8+ Kf7 70.Ra7+ Ke6 71.Ra6+ Ke5 72.Ra5+ Kxe4 73.Ra4+ Kf3 74.Ra3+ Kf2 75.Kxg6 Rg1+ 76.Kf7 a1=Q 77.Rxa1 Rxa1 78.h5 Rh1 79.Kg6 Rg1+ 80.Kf6 ½–½

=== Game 10: Gunsberg–Steinitz, 0–1 ===
Giuoco Piano, Giuoco Pianissimo (ECO C50)
1.e4 e5 2.Nf3 Nc6 3.Bc4 Bc5 4.d3 Nf6 5.c3 d6 6.Nbd2 Ne7 7.Nf1 c6 8.Qe2 0-0 9.h3 d5 10.Bb3 Ng6 11.g3 dxe4 12.dxe4 Be6 13.Ng5 Bxb3 14.axb3 Qd7 15.Be3 Bxe3 16.Qxe3 b6 17.Nd2 c5 18.Ngf3 Rad8 19.Nc4 Rfe8 20.Ncd2 Re7 21.Kf1 h5 22.Kg2 h4 23.Kh2 Qb5 24.c4 Qc6 25.Rac1 Red7 26.Rc3 Nh5 27.Rg1 Qf6 28.Nf1 Rd1 29.Qe2 hxg3+ 30.fxg3 Ra1 31.N3d2 Qg5 32.Rf3 Nf6 33.Rd3 Rxd3 34.Qxd3 Nf8 35.Qe3 Qg6 36.Rg2 Ne6 37.Re2 Nd4 38.Rf2 Ra2 39.Nf3 Nxf3+ 40.Qxf3 Qxe4 41.Qxe4 Nxe4 42.Re2 Ng5 43.Kg2 Ne6 0–1

=== Game 11: Steinitz–Gunsberg, ½–½ ===
Queen's Gambit Declined, Ragozin Defense (ECO D38)
1.Nf3 d5 2.d4 Nf6 3.e3 e6 4.c4 Be7 5.Nc3 0-0 6.Bd3 c5 7.cxd5 cxd4 8.Nxd4 Nxd5 9.Nxd5 Qxd5 10.0-0 Nc6 11.Nxc6 Qxc6 12.Bd2 Bf6 13.Qb3 Bd7 14.Rfc1 Qa4 15.Qxa4 Bxa4 16.Bc3 Bxc3 17.Rxc3 Bc6 18.b4 a6 19.a4 Rfd8 20.f3 Kf8 21.Raa3 h6 22.Kf2 Rdc8 23.b5 Bd7 24.Rxc8+ Rxc8 25.bxa6 bxa6 26.a5 Bb5 27.Bxb5 axb5 28.Rb3 Rb8 29.a6 ½–½

=== Game 12: Gunsberg–Steinitz, 1–0 ===
Evans Gambit (ECO C52)
1.e4 e5 2.Nf3 Nc6 3.Bc4 Bc5 4.b4 Bxb4 5.c3 Ba5 6.0-0 Qf6 7.d4 Nh6 8.Bg5 Qd6 9.d5 Nd8 10.Qa4 Bb6 11.Na3 c6 12.Be2 Bc7 13.Nc4 Qf8 14.d6 Bxd6 15.Nb6 Rb8 16.Qxa7 Ng4 17.Nh4 Ne6 18.Bxg4 Nxg5 19.Nf5 Ne6 20.Rfd1 Bc7 21.Na8 Rxa8 22.Qxa8 Kd8 23.Rxd7+ Kxd7 24.Rd1+ 1–0

=== Game 13: Steinitz–Gunsberg, 1–0 ===
Nimzo-Indian Defense, Rubinstein System (ECO A46)
1.Nf3 Nf6 2.d4 e6 3.e3 Bb4+ 4.c3 Be7 5.Be2 0-0 6.0-0 d5 7.c4 b6 8.Nc3 Bb7 9.cxd5 exd5 10.Ne5 Nfd7 11.f4 Nxe5 12.fxe5 c6 13.Bd2 Ba6 14.Bxa6 Nxa6 15.Qa4 Nb8 16.Rac1 f6 17.exf6 Bxf6 18.Ne2 Re8 19.Rf3 Qe7 20.Rcf1 Rc8 21.Bb4 Qe6 22.Nf4 Qe4 23.Nh5 Nd7 24.Qa6 Qe8 25.Rh3 Bg5 26.Kh1 Nf6 27.Nxf6+ gxf6 28.Qb7 Qg6 29.Qd7 Kh8 30.Be7 Rg8 31.Qxc6 Rac8 32.Qxd5 Rg7 33.Bb4 Qd3 34.Qf3 Rc2 35.Bc3 Re2 36.e4 Qxe4 37.d5 Qg6 38.Rg3 Rf7 39.d6 h6 40.h4 1–0

=== Game 14: Gunsberg–Steinitz ½–½ ===
Evans Gambit (ECO C52)
1.e4 e5 2.Nf3 Nc6 3.Bc4 Bc5 4.b4 Bxb4 5.c3 Ba5 6.0-0 Qf6 7.d4 h6 8.Bb5 Nge7 9.Ba3 exd4 10.e5 Qe6 11.cxd4 Bb4 12.Bb2 d5 13.Nc3 0-0 14.Ne2 Ng6 15.Qb3 Ba5 16.Ne1 Nce7 17.f4 Qb6 18.Ba3 f5 19.Qa4 c6 20.Bd3 Qd8 21.Qc2 b5 22.Kh1 Bb6 23.g4 a5 24.Rg1 b4 25.gxf5 Bxf5 26.Bxf5 Rxf5 27.Rxg6 bxa3 28.Rxc6 Nxc6 29.Qxf5 Nxd4 30.Nxd4 Bxd4 31.Qe6+ Kh8 32.Rd1 Bc3 33.Rxd5 Qb8 ½–½

=== Game 15: Steinitz–Gunsberg, ½–½ ===
Queen's Indian Defense, Spassky System (ECO E14)
1.Nf3 Nf6 2.d4 e6 3.e3 b6 4.c4 Bb7 5.Nc3 d5 6.cxd5 Nxd5 7.Bb5+ c6 8.Bd3 Be7 9.e4 Nxc3 10.bxc3 0-0 11.0-0 c5 12.Be3 cxd4 13.cxd4 Nc6 14.Rc1 Ba3 15.Rc3 Bb4 16.Rc4 Be7 17.Qa4 Na5 18.Rc2 Rc8 19.Rfc1 Rxc2 20.Rxc2 Qa8 21.Nd2 Bc6 22.Bb5 Bxe4 23.Nxe4 Qxe4 24.Rc7 Bf6 25.Rxa7 Nc6 26.Ra8 Nxd4 27.Rxf8+ Kxf8 28.Qa3+ Kg8 29.Qa6 g5 30.Bxd4 Bxd4 31.Bf1 Bc5 32.Qe2 Qd4 33.g4 Kg7 34.Qf3 Qa4 35.Qc3+ f6 36.Qc4 Qc6 37.Qe2 Qd6 38.Qf3 Qd4 39.Bd3 ½–½

=== Game 16: Gunsberg–Steinitz, 1–0 ===
Evans Gambit (ECO C52)
1.e4 e5 2.Nf3 Nc6 3.Bc4 Bc5 4.b4 Bxb4 5.c3 Ba5 6.0-0 Qf6 7.d4 h6 8.Qa4 Bb6 9.Bb5 Nge7 10.Ba3 exd4 11.e5 Qg6 12.cxd4 Nd5 13.Re1 Nf4 14.g3 Qg4 15.Nbd2 Nh3+ 16.Kg2 Ng5 17.Bb2 Ne7 18.Be2 Ne6 19.Kh1 Qf5 20.Nh4 Qxf2 21.Ne4 1–0

=== Game 17: Steinitz–Gunsberg, ½–½ ===
Queen's Gambit Declined, Marshall Defense (ECO D06)
1.d4 d5 2.c4 Nf6 3.cxd5 Nxd5 4.e4 Nf6 5.Nc3 e5 6.dxe5 Qxd1+ 7.Kxd1 Ng4 8.Nd5 Kd7 9.Nh3 c6 10.Nc3 Nxe5 11.f4 Ng4 12.Be2 Ke8 13.Kc2 Bc5 14.f5 Ne3+ 15.Kd3 Nxg2 16.b4 Bxb4 17.Rg1 Nh4 18.Rxg7 Ng6 19.fxg6 hxg6 20.Ng5 Be7 21.Rh7 Rxh7 22.Nxh7 f6 23.Bf4 Kf7 24.Rg1 Na6 25.e5 Bf5+ 26.Kd2 Bb4 27.Rg3 Nc5 28.Kc1 Ba3+ 29.Kd1 g5 30.Bc4+ Ne6 31.Nxg5+ fxg5 32.Bxg5 Rg8 33.h4 b5 34.Nxb5 cxb5 35.Bxe6+ Kxe6 36.Rxa3 Kxe5 37.Rxa7 Bd3 38.Kd2 Bf1 39.Kc3 Rc8+ 40.Kb4 Rg8 41.Ra5 Ke4 42.Ra6 Kf3 43.Rf6+ Kg2 44.Rf5 Be2 45.Be3 Bd3 46.Rf2+ Kg3 47.Rd2 Rg4+ 48.Kc5 Bc4 49.h5 Kf3 50.Bd4 Rg5+ 51.Kb4 Rxh5 52.a4 Ke4 53.Bc5 Bd3 54.axb5 Rh1 55.Rb2 Kd5 56.Bf2 Rb1 ½–½

=== Game 18: Gunsberg–Steinitz, 0–1 ===
1=Evans Gambit (ECO C52)
1.e4 e5 2.Nf3 Nc6 3.Bc4 Bc5 4.b4 Bxb4 5.c3 Ba5 6.0-0 Qf6 7.d4 Nge7 8.Qa4 Bb6 9.Bg5 Qd6 10.Na3 exd4 11.Nb5 Qg6 12.cxd4 a6 13.d5 Ne5 14.Nxe5 Qxg5 15.Nf3 Qh6 16.Bb3 0-0 17.Rac1 c6 18.Nbd4 c5 19.Ne2 d6 20.Ng3 Bd8 21.e5 b5 22.Qa3 c4 23.exd6 Nxd5 24.Bc2 b4 25.Qa4 Qxd6 26.Be4 Nb6 27.Qc2 Rb8 28.Bxh7+ Kh8 29.Rcd1 Qh6 30.Bf5 g6 31.Bxc8 Rxc8 32.Qb2+ Qg7 33.Qxb4 Bc7 34.Rd4 Rfd8 35.Rh4+ Kg8 36.Ng5 Rd7 37.Re4 c3 38.Rfe1 Rdd8 39.Ne2 Nd5 40.Qa4 Qf6 41.Nf3 Bb6 42.Rc1 c2 43.h3 Qb2 44.Qb3 Qxb3 45.axb3 a5 46.Rc4 Rxc4 47.bxc4 Nb4 48.g3 Bxf2+ 49.Kxf2 Nd3+ 50.Ke3 Nxc1 51.Nxc1 Rd1 52.Ne2 a4 53.Nfd4 c1=Q+ 54.Nxc1 Rxc1 0–1

=== Game 19: Steinitz–Gunsberg, ½–½ ===
Queen's Gambit Declined, Three Knights Variation (ECO D37)
1.d4 d5 2.e3 Nf6 3.c4 e6 4.Nc3 Be7 5.Nf3 0-0 6.Be2 dxc4 7.Bxc4 c5 8.0-0 Nc6 9.dxc5 Bxc5 10.Qxd8 Rxd8 11.Bd2 a6 12.Rac1 Ba7 13.Rfd1 Bd7 14.Be1 Ng4 15.e4 Nce5 16.Nxe5 Nxe5 17.Be2 Bc6 18.Kf1 Bd4 19.f3 Rd7 20.Bf2 Rad8 21.Bxd4 Rxd4 22.Rxd4 Rxd4 23.Rd1 Rxd1+ 24.Nxd1 Kf8 25.Ke1 Ng6 26.Ne3 Ke7 27.Kd2 Kd6 28.Kc3 Kc5 29.g3 Bb5 30.b4+ Kb6 31.Bd1 Kc7 32.a4 Bd7 33.f4 Bc6 34.Kd4 Ne7 35.Bb3 Be8 36.Nc4 Nc6+ 37.Kc5 Nd8 38.Nb6 f6 39.b5 axb5 40.axb5 Bg6 41.Bc2 h5 ½–½
