= WestBridge-Anand Chess Academy =

Fellowship program for chess prodigies

The WestBridge-Anand Chess Academy was founded by Indian chess grandmaster Viswanathan Anand in December 2020 in partnership with WestBridge Capital. A fellowship program to mentor junior chess prodigies, its founding instructors include grandmasters Sandipan Chanda, Artur Yusupov, Grzegorz Gajewski, and six-time world champion candidate Boris Gelfand, as well as Anand himself. (Amongst its alumni is Gukesh Dommaraju). Institutionally it was inspired by Olympic Gold Quest, the Mikhail Chess Academy (more generally the Soviet school of chess), and the Frank P. Samford, Jr. Chess Fellowship of Stanford University.
