= Mikhail Chigorin =

Russian chess player (1850–1908)

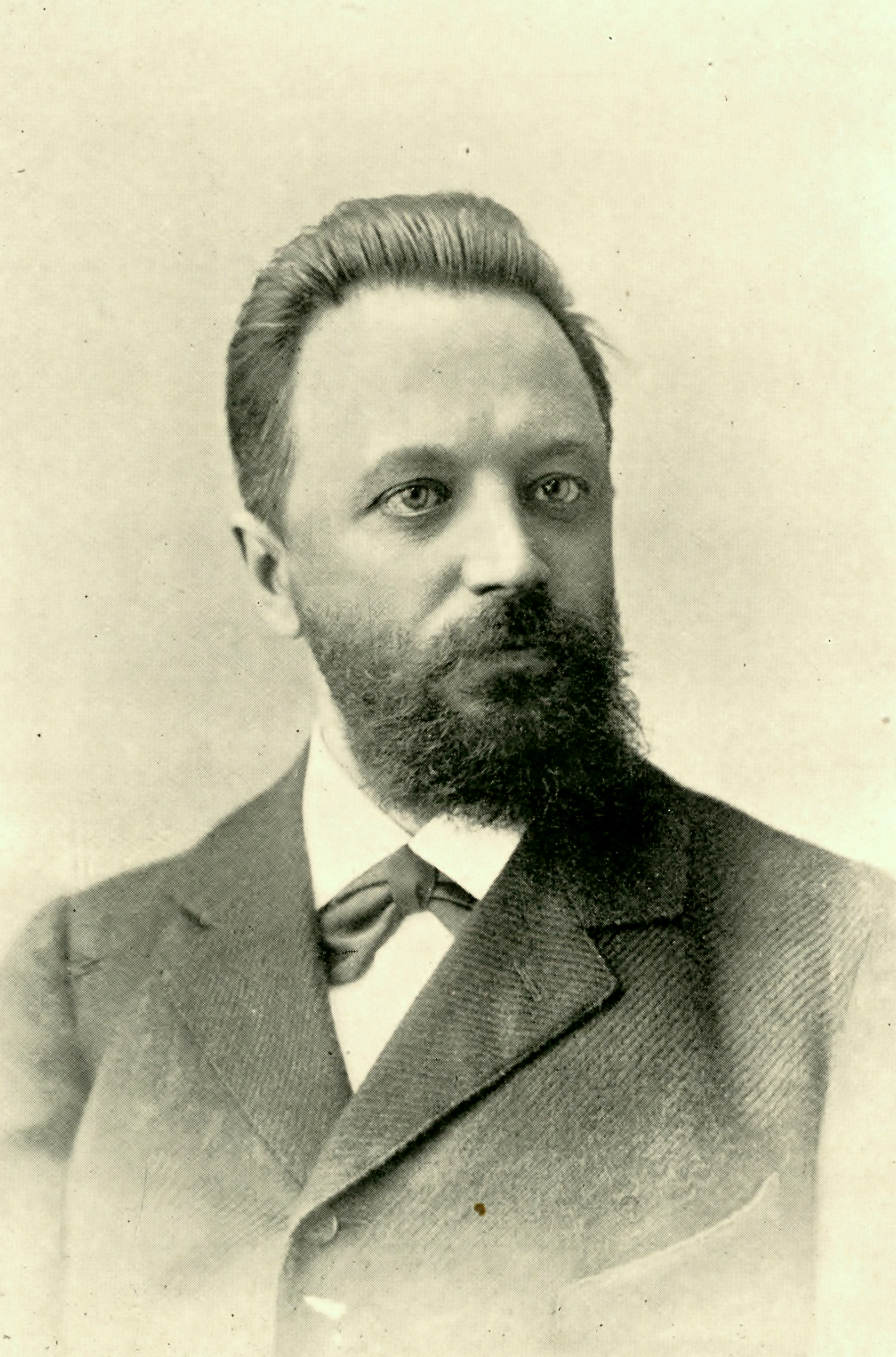

Personal information
- Born: Mikhail Ivanovich Chigorin; 12 November 1850 Gatchina, St. Petersburg Governorate, Russian Empire
- Died: 25 January 1908 (aged 57) Lublin, Congress Poland, Russian Empire

Chess career
- Country: Russian Empire

Mikhail Ivanovich Chigorin (also Tchigorin; Russian: Михаи́л Ива́нович Чиго́рин; 12 November [O.S. 31 October] 1850 – 25 January [O.S. 12 January] 1908) was a Russian chess player. He played two World Championship matches against Wilhelm Steinitz, losing both times. The last great player of the Romantic chess style, he also served as a major source of inspiration for the Soviet chess school, which dominated the chess world in the middle and latter parts of the 20th century.

== Chess career ==
Chigorin was born in Gatchina but moved to nearby Saint Petersburg some time later. His father worked in the Okhtensk gunpowder works. Chigorin's parents died young and Chigorin entered the Gatchinsk Orphans' Institute at the age of 10. He became serious about chess uncommonly late in life; his schoolteacher taught him the moves at the age of 16, but he did not take to the game until around 1874, having first finished his studies before commencing a career as a government officer.

Once smitten with the game, he terminated his employment and started life as a chess professional. In 1876, he started a chess magazine, Chess Sheet, which he edited until 1881 (only 250 subscribers in all of Russia). He played a series of matches with established masters Emanuel Schiffers (1878–1880) and Semyon Alapin (1880) and notched up a large plus score against each. It was not long after that he was regarded as the best player in the city and possibly the whole of Russia.

His first international tournament was Berlin 1881, where he was equal third (+10−5=1) with Szymon Winawer, behind Johannes Zukertort and Joseph Henry Blackburne. This event included 17 master competitors.

At the great London tournament of 1883, he finished fourth (+16−10=0) behind Zukertort, Wilhelm Steinitz and Blackburne. The 14 competitors in this double round robin event included practically all of the best chessplayers in the world.

At the tournament of New York 1889 he was equal first with Max Weiss. Following this success he challenged the world champion Steinitz for a match with the World Championship at stake.

The World Championship match was played at Havana in 1889, but he lost 10½–6½ (+6−10=1). A second World Championship match was played also at Havana in 1892, but he narrowly lost 12½–10½ (+8−10=5).

His overall record against Steinitz was very close (+24−27=8). He also played a much publicised 'telegraph match' against Steinitz in 1890, devised to settle a theoretical argument. Chigorin had the slight advantage of choosing the openings in advance from a list supplied by Steinitz and duly won both games.

Towards the end of the century, his standing at home and abroad continued to rise, and he was in the world's top four or five players. His reputation as a match player too, continued to grow. He drew an 1893 match with Siegbert Tarrasch in Saint Petersburg (+9−9=4) and in his lifetime, maintained a narrow plus score against Tarrasch (+14−13=8), who was a fearsome player in his own right. He had a strong plus score against Richard Teichmann (+8−3=1), but a poor record versus David Janowski (+4−17=4). Most of his losses to Janowski occurred late in Chigorin's life, when he was past his best.

In all likelihood, his best performance occurred at the Hastings 1895 chess tournament, where he placed second, ahead of reigning world champion Emanuel Lasker, Tarrasch and former world champion Steinitz. All of the greatest players of the time participated in the event and Chigorin's outstanding result included winning his individual encounter with tournament victor, Harry Nelson Pillsbury. Pillsbury had great respect for Chigorin's ability and for good reason, as Chigorin had a marginal lifetime plus score against him (+8−7=6). Although Chigorin had a poor record against Lasker in serious play (+1−8=4), he was victorious with the black pieces in their first game of this 1895 tournament, in which he outplayed Lasker in a classic two knights versus two bishops ending.

In other major competitions, he was joint winner at Budapest 1896, and beat Rudolf Charousek (+3−1) in the playoff. At Cologne in 1898, he was equal second with Charousek and Wilhelm Cohn after Amos Burn. His 7th-place finish at London 1899 was disappointing in comparison, but this was another tournament notable for its impressive list of participants. At Monte Carlo 1901, he placed equal third after Janowski and Carl Schlechter.

A highly skilled exponent of gambit lines, he won the King's Gambit-themed Vienna Tournament of 1903 and defeated Lasker (+2−1=3) in a sponsored Rice Gambit tournament in Brighton. The latter was however something of a hollow victory, as it was emerging that the Rice Gambit was unsound and so, playing the black side in each game gave him a distinct advantage. He was also perhaps the most skilled 19th century practitioner of the Evans Gambit, which featured in many of his great duels with Steinitz. At Łódź 1906, in a four-person event, he finished second to Akiba Rubinstein.

Alongside these international events, he also entered and won the first three All-Russia Tournaments of 1899, 1900/01 and 1903. These prestigious successes further cemented his reputation as Russia's best player. Upon losing the fourth such event in 1906, he challenged the winner Gersz Salwe to a match and came out the victor (+7−5=3).

== Style and demeanour ==
His playing style featured a well-honed tactical ability and an imaginative approach to the opening. He rejected many of the inflexible doctrines put forward by Tarrasch and Steinitz, but accepted Steinitz's teachings about the soundness of the defensive centre. Indeed, he went on to add to the development of the concept through the work he carried out with closed variations of the Ruy Lopez. He also pioneered some variations of the Slav Defence. A large bearded man, Chigorin was described as 'decidedly handsome'.

Frank Marshall once commented on the highly agitated state that would possess Chigorin when faced with difficult positions: aside from the usual frantic foot-tapping and crossing of legs, he would occasionally become "a bundle of nerves", at which point his temperament could turn "quite fierce".

== Later life ==
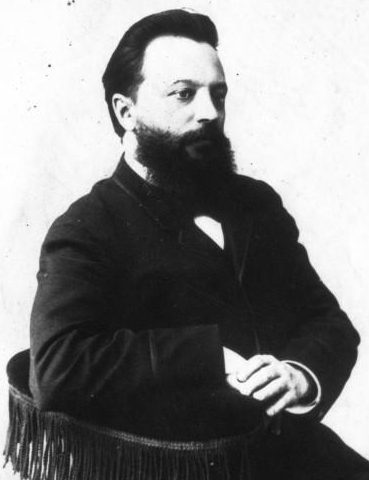
Chigorin shortly before his death in 1908

As an ambassador for Russian chess, Chigorin was a shining example; he gave many lectures, wrote magazine articles and chess columns and subsidised or otherwise supported a number of periodicals to keep them afloat despite low readership levels. He also founded a chess club in Saint Petersburg and tried for many years to establish a chess association, an attempt that finally succeeded just a few years after his death.

According to the Canadian International Master Lawrence Day, Chigorin travelled with the young Fedor Bogatyrchuk to Russian events in the 1905–1907 period, helping to train him. After moving to Canada following World War II, Bogatyrchuk then trained Day.

By 1907, Chigorin's health (both mental and physical) started to decline dramatically. He failed badly in a chess tournament. He was clearly not in good health and was diagnosed by doctors in Carlsbad with an advanced and untreatable case of diabetes. This prompted a prediction that he had only months to live, whereupon he returned to his estranged wife and daughter in Lublin and died the following January. Not long before he died Chigorin had an emotional outburst and burned his chess set. In 1909, a Chigorin Memorial tournament was played in St. Petersburg. After that many more followed: from 1947 onwards mainly in Sochi and from 1990 back in Saint Petersburg.

== Legacy ==
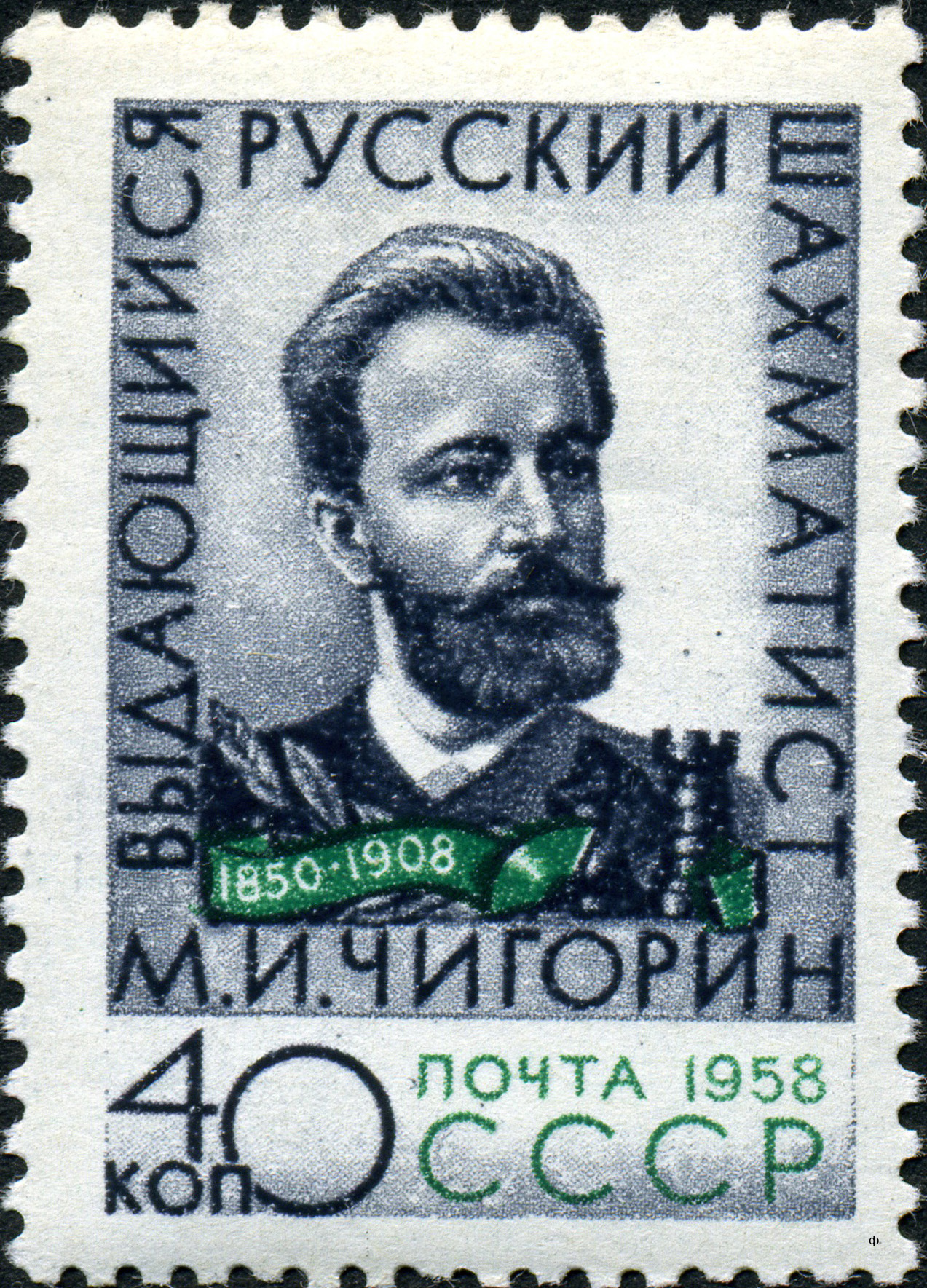
Chigorin on a 1958 Soviet postage stamp

Many Russians regard Mikhail Chigorin as the founder of their "School of chess", later to become known as the Soviet School of Chess. Overshadowed to some extent in the 1920s by the exciting new theories of the hypermodern movement, Chigorin's influence nevertheless demands a prominent and permanent place in the Soviet chess hegemony of the 20th century.

=== Openings ===
Chigorin has several chess openings or variations of openings named after him, the two most important being the Chigorin Variation of the Ruy Lopez (1.e4 e5 2.Nf3 Nc6 3.Bb5 a6 4.Ba4 Nf6 5.0-0 Be7 6.Re1 b5 7.Bb3 d6 8.c3 0-0 9.h3 Na5 10.Bc2 c5 11.d4 Qc7) and the Chigorin Defence to the Queen's Gambit (1.d4 d5 2.c4 Nc6). Whilst the former has remained popular through the 1900s, the latter struggled to attract a great many devotees until relatively recently. Igor Miladinović has used the Chigorin Defence with great regularity, but its current revival owes much to the efforts of Alexander Morozevich, who has championed the opening both in play and in his book – The Chigorin Defence According To Morozevich (published 2007).

Another opening line invented by Chigorin is 1.e4 e6 2.Qe2 in the French Defence. It is now generally regarded as a forerunner of King's Indian setups, but Chigorin also played it with other ideas (such as b2–b3) in mind.

The list of openings in The Oxford Companion to Chess contains eight openings named after Chigorin:

- 1.d4 d5 2.Nc3 – Chigorin Variation
- 1.d4 d5 2.c4 Nc6 – Chigorin Defence
- 1.d4 d5 2.c4 e6 3.Nc3 c6 4.Nf3 Nf6 5.e3 Nbd7 6.Bd3 Bd6 – Chigorin Variation
- 1.d4 f5 2.e4 fxe4 3.Nc3 Nf6 4.Bg5 c6 – Chigorin Variation
- 1.e4 e5 2.Nc3 Nc6 3.f4 exf4 4.d4 Qh4+ 5.Ke2 d5 6.exd5 Qe7+ 7.Kf2 Qh4+ 8.g3 fxg3+ 9.hxg3 – Chigorin Variation
- 1.e4 e5 2.Nf3 Nc6 3.Bb5 a6 4.Ba4 Nf6 5.0-0 Be7 6.Re1 b5 7.Bb3 d6 8.c3 Na5 9.Bc2 c5 – Chigorin Variation
- 1.e4 e5 2.Nf3 Nc6 3.Bb5 a6 4.Ba4 Nf6 5.0-0 Be7 6.Re1 b5 7.Bb3 d6 8.c3 0-0 9.h3 Na5 10.Bc2 c5 11.d4 Qc7 – Chigorin Variation
- 1.e4 e5 2.Nf3 Nc6 3.Bb5 Nf6 4.0-0 d6 5.d4 Nd7 – Chigorin Variation

== In popular culture ==
A famous Chigorin game played against Steinitz in 1892 is used as the base for the plot of The Squares of the City, a 1965 science-fiction novel by John Brunner.
