= Soviet chess school =

Generally accepted chess play in the Soviet Union

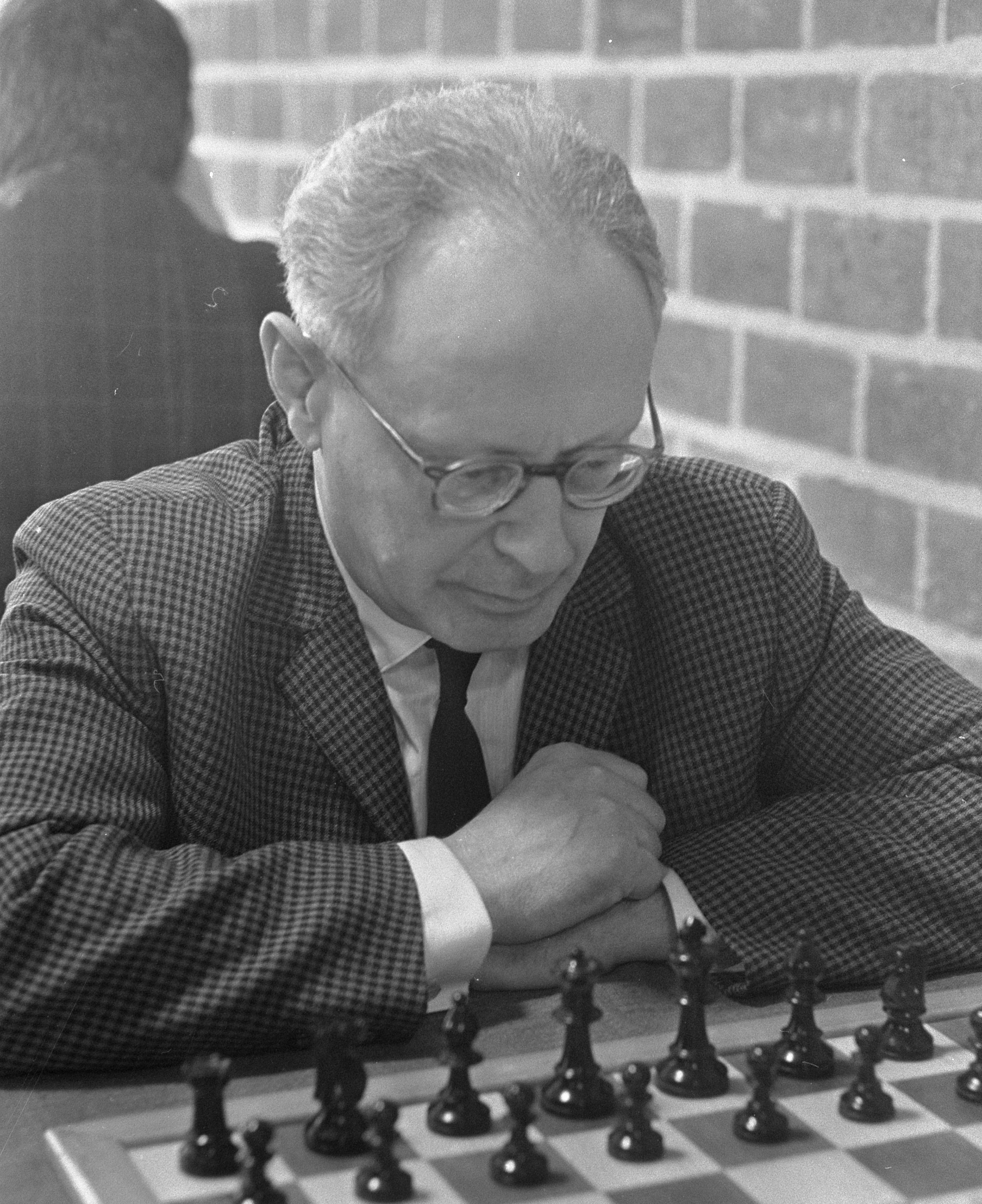
Mikhail Botvinnik, c. 1969

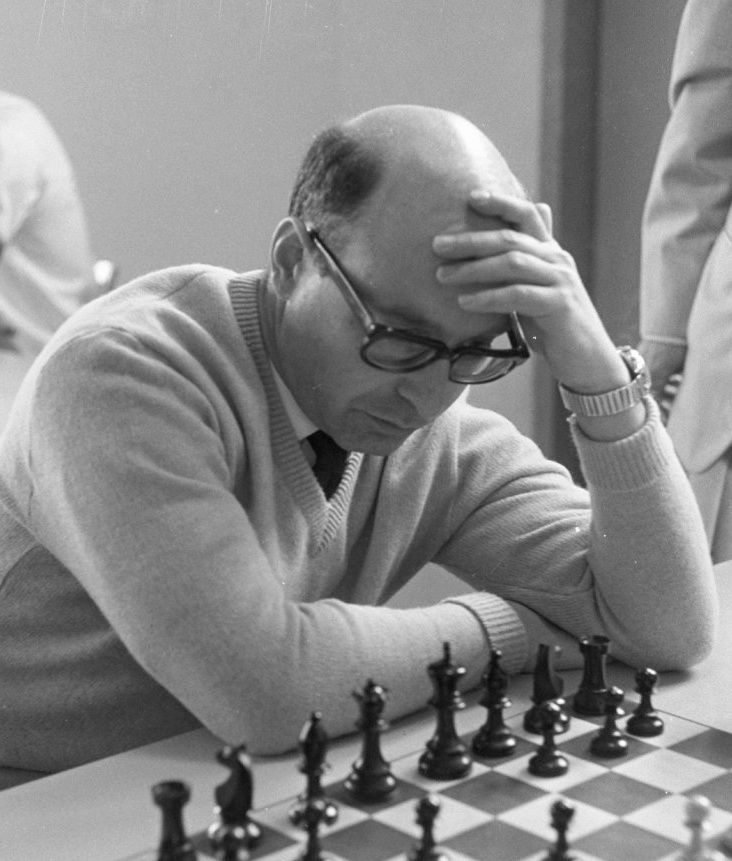
David Bronstein, c. 1968

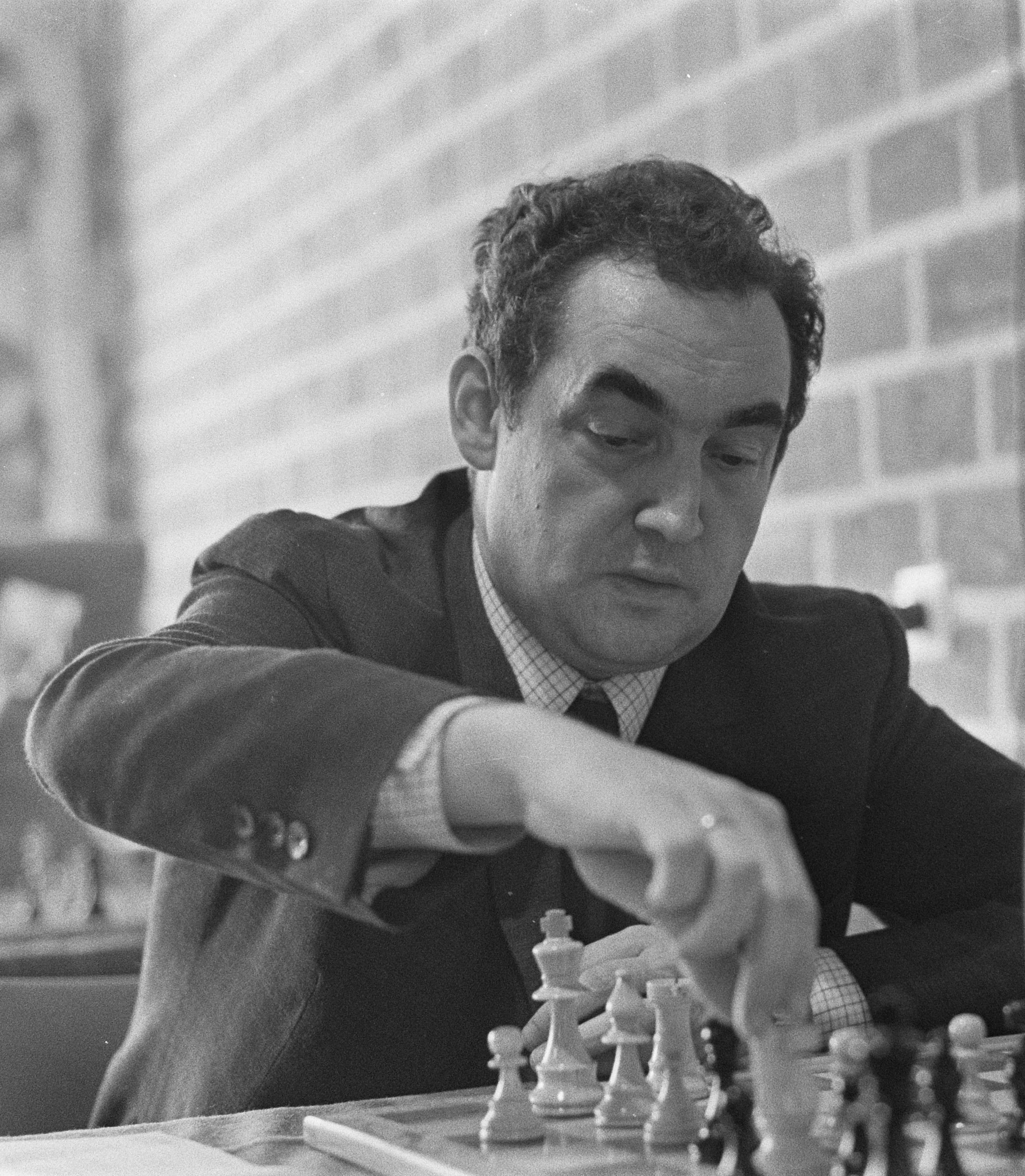
Mark Taimanov, c. 1970

The Soviet school of chess was asserted to be a national style of play by Soviet chess players and journalists. Although chess had been a game of the bourgeoisie and upper classes before the Russian Revolution, its popularity among Bolshevik leaders, including Vladimir Lenin, contributed to it being supported by state leaders in the Soviet Union as a national pastime. A keen sportsman, Lenin spent much of his free time outdoors or playing chess.

Worldwide references to a now-solid Soviet school of chess only occurred after World War II, when a generation of Soviet chess players, led by soon-to-be world champion Mikhail Botvinnik, began a string of victories over international competitors that surprised the world.

Generally speaking, chess experts in the USSR described the Soviet school of chess as a fast-paced, daring style of play best exemplified by the young generation of postwar players like David Bronstein. Not all Soviet players used this playing style; the most notable exception was Botvinnik, whom grandmaster Mark Taimanov compared to the methodical Wilhelm Steinitz. The main contribution of the Soviet school of chess was not the style of players but their emphasis on rigorous training and study of the game, i.e. considering chess a sport rather than an art or science.

== Sample game ==
The following is a game played in 1938 between Mikhail Botvinnik (White) and José Raúl Capablanca (Black). The opening is the Nimzo-Indian Defence (ECO code E40). Unlike most Indian Defences, the Nimzo-Indian does not involve an immediate fianchetto, although Black often follows up with ...b6 and ...Bb7. By pinning White's knight, Black prevents the threatened 4.e4 and seeks to inflict doubled pawns on White. White will attempt to create a pawn centre and develop his pieces to prepare for an assault on the Black position. This game is often set as an example for the foundation of chess strategy in chess middlegames.

1.d4 Nf6 2.c4 e6 3.Nc3 Bb4 4.e3 d5 5.a3 Bxc3+ 6.bxc3 c5 7.cxd5 exd5 8.Bd3 0-0 9.Ne2 b6 10.0-0 Ba6 11.Bxa6 Nxa6 12.Bb2 Qd7 13.a4 Rfe8 14.Qd3 c4 15.Qc2 Nb8 16.Rae1 Nc6 17.Ng3 Na5 18.f3 Nb3 19.e4 Qxa4 20.e5 Nd7 21.Qf2 g6 22.f4 f5 23.exf6 Nxf6 24.f5 Rxe1 25.Rxe1 Re8 26.Re6 Rxe6 27.fxe6 Kg7 28.Qf4 Qe8 29.Qe5 Qe7 30.Ba3 Qxa3 31.Nh5+ gxh5 32.Qg5+ Kf8 33.Qxf6+ Kg8 34.e7 Qc1+ 35.Kf2 Qc2+ 36.Kg3 Qd3+ 37.Kh4 Qe4+ 38.Kxh5 Qe2+ 39.Kh4 Qe4+ 40.g4 Qe1+ 41.Kh5 1–0

What would have followed is a mating attack from Botvinnik: 41.Kh5 h6 42.Qg6+ Kh8 43.e8=R+ Qxe8 44.Qxe8+ Kg7 45.Qe7+ Kh8 46.Kxh6 b5 47.Qg7#.

Capablanca's resignation this game, in Garry Kasparov's opinion, "symbolized the end of an heroic era of chess titans, dominating the field with their natural genius. Since this historic moment the professional touch has played a more and more important role as an integral part of chess, the path to ultimate success."

== See also ==
- Alexander Alekhine
- Anatoly Karpov
- Boris Gelfand
- Efim Bogoljubov
- List of chess openings
- School of chess
