= World Chess Championship 1889 =

Chess match between Wilhelm Steinitz and Mikhail Chigorin

	Defending champion	Challenger
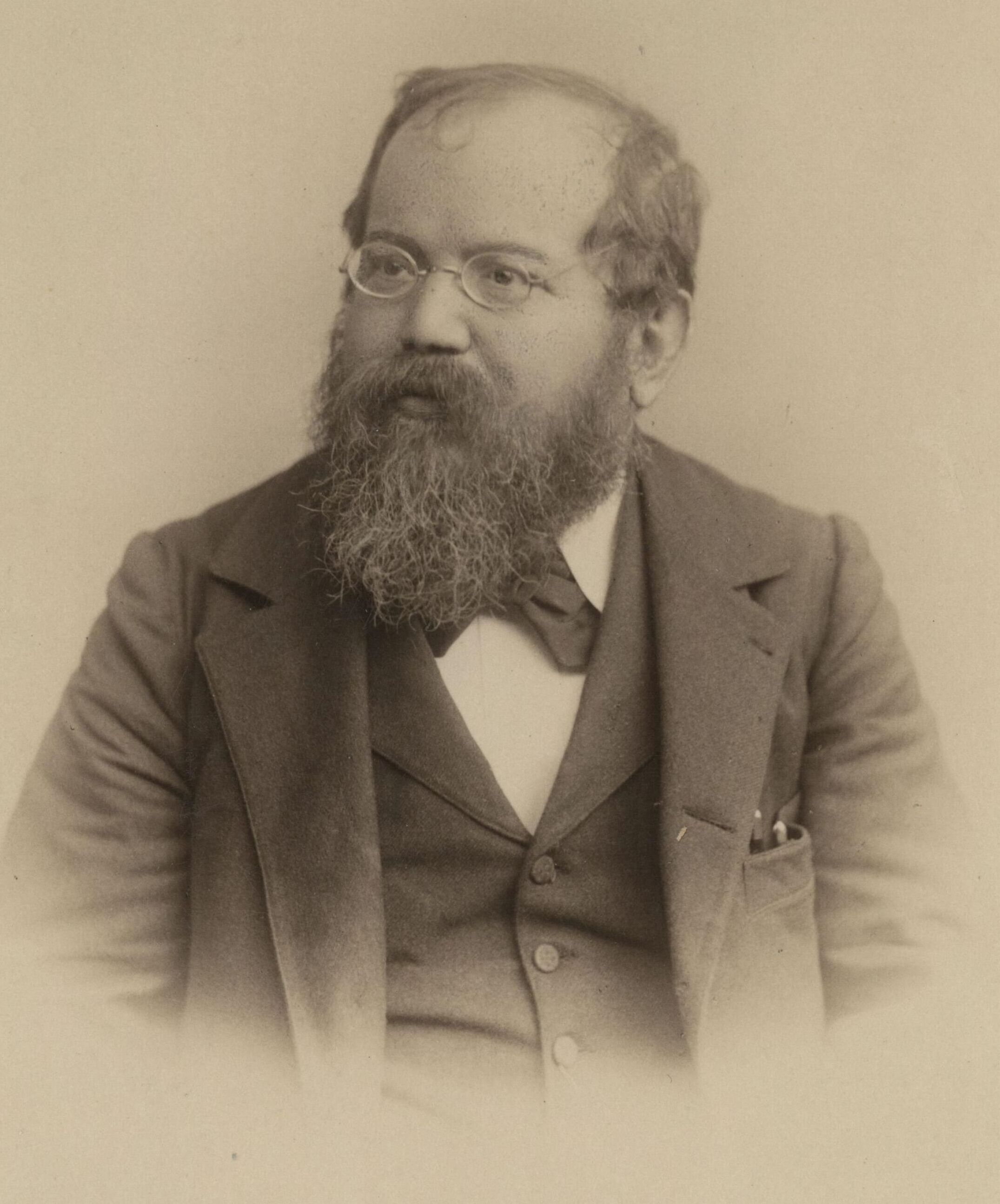
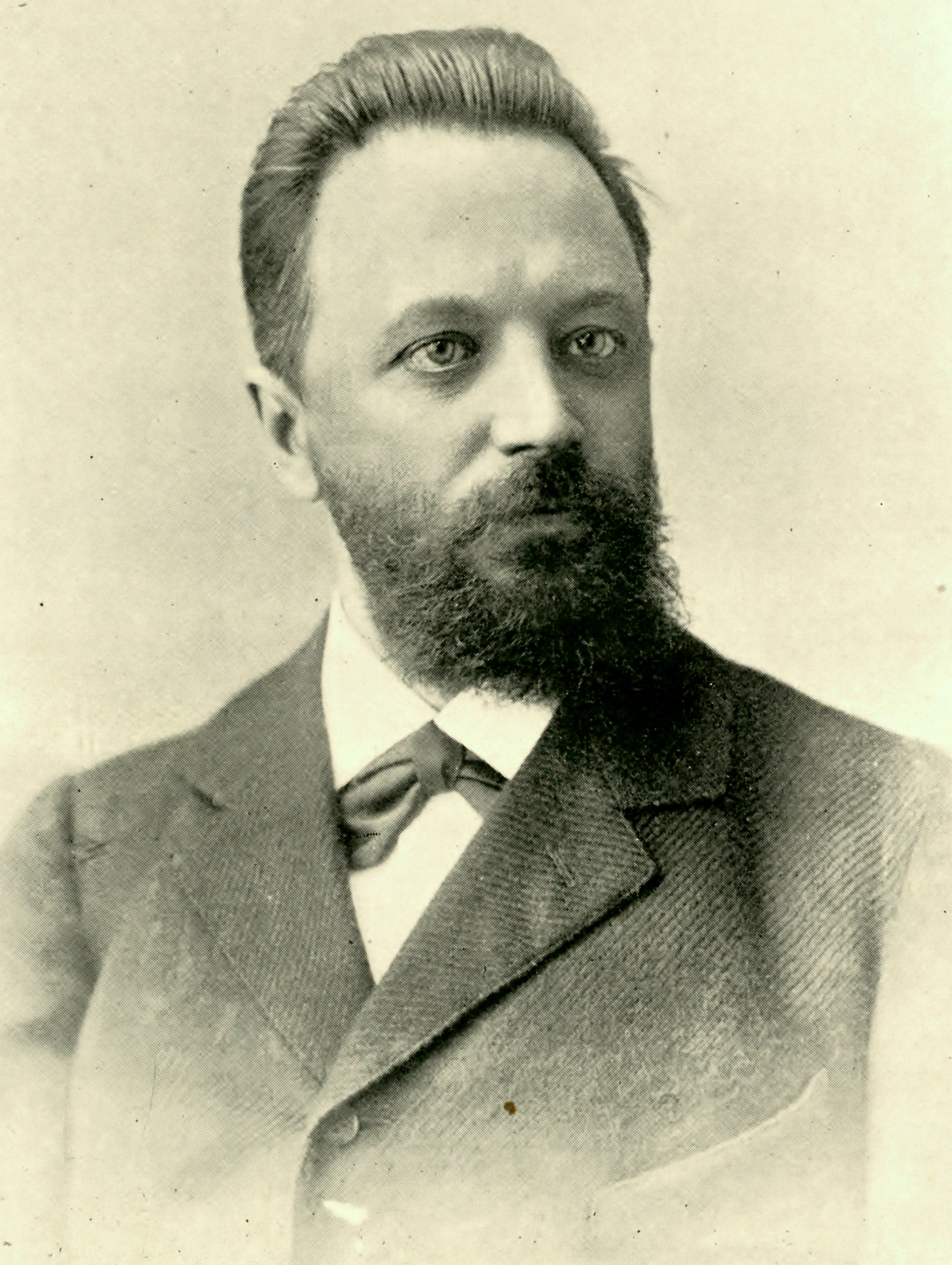
	Wilheilm Steinitz	Mikhail Chigorin
	(United States) Wilhelm Steinitz	(Russia) Mikhail Chigorin
10½	Scores	6½
	Born 14 May 1836; 52 years old	Born 12 November 1850; 38 years old

The World Chess Championship 1889, considered the second official World Chess Championship match, was held in Havana, Cuba. Defending champion Wilhelm Steinitz beat Russian challenger Mikhail Chigorin by a score of 10½–6½. The match consisted of a maximum of 20 games, meaning the first player to 10½ points would be crowned the victor, marking a slight deviation from the "first to ten" format of Steinitz's prior title bout in 1886.

== Background ==
Steinitz defeated Johannes Zukertort in 1886. At that time, however, there was no international organization recognizing the formal title of World Champion or a structured process to determine a challenger for the titleholder.

Steinitz developed a strategic approach to "attack and defense", frequently encouraging opponents to take the initiative. When in control of the position, he would create long-term positional weaknesses for his opponents, limiting their options in the middlegame and endgame. Despite his success, Steinitz's positional style was not universally appreciated, and some critics remained skeptical that aggressive, tactical play was becoming obsolete. At times, Steinitz adopted highly defensive formations that limited his counterplay opportunities and made his position more vulnerable.

== Preparations ==
After the 1886 match, a search was begun to identify a worthy challenger. The members of the Havana Chess Club invited Steinitz to play in Cuba against a challenger of his own choosing. Before 1914, the incumbent champion had the final say over the challenger, venue, and playing conditions.

Steinitz chose Mikhail Chigorin, against whom Steinitz had a poor record in previous tournament meetings. Chigorin was a player with a strong record. The contrast in playing styles—Chigorin’s aggressive, tactical approach versus Steinitz’s positional strategy—was expected to produce a good match.

== The match ==
Chigorin accepted the match conditions, and the bookmakers began to take wagers on the outcome. Despite some public criticism of Steinitz’s style, betting trends suggested he was still widely regarded as the stronger player. The match was played in Havana, between January 20 and February 24, 1889. The total purse for the contestants was $1,150, the smallest prize fund of all the world championship encounters.

== Results ==
The match was to last a maximum of 20 games, so the winner would be the first to reach a minimum of 10½ points. In the event of a 10–10 tie, the defending champion would retain the title.

World Chess Championship Match 1889
	1	2	3	4	5	6	7	8	9	10	11	12	13	14	15	16	17	Total
Mikhail Chigorin (Russian Empire)	1	0	1	0	0	1	1	0	0	0	1	0	1	0	0	0	½	6½
William Steinitz (United States)	0	1	0	1	1	0	0	1	1	1	0	1	0	1	1	1	½	10½

Steinitz won the match, retaining his title.

== Games ==
=== Game 1, Chigorin–Steinitz, 1–0 ===
Evans Gambit (C52)
1.e4 e5 2.Nf3 Nc6 3.Bc4 Bc5 4.b4 Bxb4 5.c3 Ba5 6.0-0 Qf6 7.d4 Nge7 8.Ng5 Nd8 9.f4 exd4 10.cxd4 Bb6 11.Be3 d5 12.Bxd5 Nxd5 13.exd5 0-0 14.Nc3 Re8 15.Nge4 Qg6 16.Bf2 c6 17.Re1 Bd7 18.Nc5 Rxe1+ 19.Qxe1 Qd6 20.Qe3 cxd5 21.Nxd7 Qxd7 22.Nxd5 Nc6 23.Nxb6 axb6 24.Re1 h6 25.d5 Nb4 26.Rd1 Nxd5 27.Qe5 Rxa2? (27...Ra5 was the only move in this position.) 28.Rxd5 Ra1+ 29.Qxa1 Qxd5 30.Bxb6 Qe4 31.g3 h5 32.Qd4 Qf3 33.Qe3 Qd1+ 34.Kg2 Qc2+ 35.Qf2 Qc6+ 36.Kg1 h4 37.Qc5 hxg3 38.hxg3 Qe4 39.Kf2 Qh1 40.Qc8+ Kh7 41.Qg4 Qh2+ 42.Kf1 Qh1+ 43.Bg1 Qd5 44.Qh3+ Kg8 45.Qc8+ Kh7 46.Qc5 Qd3+ 47.Kg2 Qd7 48.Bd4 f6 49.Kf3 b5 50.g4 Qb7+ 51.Kg3 b4 52.Qf5+ Kg8 53.g5 fxg5 54.Qe6+ Kh7 55.fxg5 Qc7+ 56.Kg4 g6 57.Qf6 Qc8+ 58.Kh4 1–0

=== Game 2, Steinitz–Chigorin, 1–0 ===
Steinitz–Chigorin, game 2

Position: d8 black rook, f8 black rook, g8 black king, a7 black pawn, b7 black pawn, d7 black queen, e7 black bishop, g7 black pawn, h7 black pawn, d6 white pawn, g6 black knight, e5 black pawn, h5 white rook, e4 white knight, g4 white pawn, c3 white bishop, e3 white pawn, a2 white pawn, b2 white pawn, f2 white pawn, c1 white rook, d1 white queen, e1 white king

Position after 24.d6. Black's bishop is trapped, if 24...Bf6, then 25.g5 ensures that the bishop still has no escape.

Queen's Pawn Game (D02)
1.Nf3 d5 2.d4 Bg4 3.Ne5 Bh5 4.Qd3 Qc8 5.c4 f6 6.Nf3 e6 7.Nc3 Bg6 8.Qd1 c6 9.e3 Bd6 10.Bd2 Ne7 11.Rc1 Nd7 12.Nh4 f5 13.g4 Nf6 14.h3 Ne4 15.Bd3 fxg4? (This just loses a pawn.) 16.Nxg6 Nxg6 17.Bxe4 dxe4 18.Nxe4 Be7 19.hxg4 e5 20.d5 Qd7 21.Bc3 Rd8 22.Rh5 cxd5 23.cxd5 0-0 24.d6 (see diagram) Qe6 25.Qb3 Qxb3 26.axb3 Bxd6 27.Nxd6 Rxd6 28.Bb4 Rb6 29.Bxf8 Kxf8 30.Rc8+ Kf7 31.Rc7+ Kf6 32.Rf5+ Ke6 33.Rff7 Rb4 34.Rxb7 Rxg4 35.Rxg7 h5 36.Rxa7 Kf5 37.f3 Rg2 38.Ra6 1–0

=== Game 3, Chigorin–Steinitz, 1–0 ===
Ruy Lopez, Steinitz Defence (C62)
1.e4 e5 2.Nf3 Nc6 3.Bb5 d6 4.d4 Bd7 5.dxe5 dxe5 6.0-0 Bd6 7.Nc3 Nge7 8.Bg5 f6 9.Be3 0-0 10.Bc4+ Kh8 11.Nb5 Nc8 12.Qd2 Qe8 13.Rad1 Bg4 14.Be2 Nd8 15.c4 Ne6 16.h3 Bh5 17.c5 Be7 18.Qd5 Qc6 19.Bc4 Be8 20.a4 Nxc5 21.Bxc5 Bxc5 22.Qxc6 Bxc6 23.Nxc7 Nd6 24.Bb3 Bxe4 25.Nxa8 Bxf3 26.gxf3 Rxa8 27.Rd5 b6 28.Rfd1 Rd8 29.Kg2 a5 30.Bc2 g6 31.h4 Kg7 32.f4 exf4 33.Kf3 f5 34.Kxf4 Kf6 35.Bb3 h6 36.h5! (This excellent move makes Black's pawn on f5 a permanent weakness.) 36...gxh5 37.Bc2 Ke7 38.Re5+ Kf8 39.Rxf5+ Ke7 40.Re5+ Kd7 41.f3 h4 42.Kg4 Rg8+ 43.Kxh4 Rg2 44.Bf5+ Kc6 45.b3 Bf2+ 46.Kh3 Rg3+ 47.Kh2 Rxf3 48.Kg2 Rf4 49.Be6 Bc5 50.Bd5+ Kd7 51.Re6 Nf5 52.Bc4+ Kc7 53.Rd3 h5 54.Bb5 Rg4+ 55.Kh2 Rh4+ 56.Rh3 Bd6+ 57.Kg2 Rg4+ 58.Kf1 Ng3+ 59.Kf2 h4 60.Rh6 Rf4+ 61.Kg2 Be7 62.Rc6+ Kb7 63.Rc4 Rf8 64.Rd4 Kc8 65.Rd7 Bd8 66.Rh2 Ne4 67.Rg7 Nc5 68.Rh3 Bf6 69.Rg6 Bd8 70.Bc4 Rf4 71.Rf3 Rd4 72.Rg7 Kb8 73.Rff7 Rd6 74.Kh3 Rd2 75.Rh7 Rd6 76.Bf1 Ne6 77.Rd7 Rc6?? (77...Rxd7 would have allowed Black to retain his drawing chances.) 78.Kg4 Rc7 79.Bc4 Rxc4+ 80.bxc4 Kc8 81.Rd6 Nc5 82.Rc6+ Kb8 83.Rh8 1–0

=== Game 4, Steinitz–Chigorin, 1–0 ===
Steinitz–Chigorin, game 4

Position: a8 black rook, e8 black king, g8 black knight, h8 black rook, a7 black pawn, b7 black pawn, c7 black pawn, f7 black pawn, g7 black pawn, h7 black pawn, c6 black knight, a5 black queen, d5 black pawn, b4 black bishop, e4 white pawn, a3 white pawn, c3 white knight, f3 white pawn, b2 white pawn, d2 white bishop, f2 white pawn, h2 white pawn, a1 white rook, d1 white queen, e1 white king, f1 white bishop, h1 white rook

After 10.a3! Chigorin fell for Steinitz's trap. Black will lose a piece.

Queen's Pawn Game (D02)
1.Nf3 d5 2.d4 Bg4 3.c4 Bxf3 4.gxf3 e6 5.cxd5 Qxd5 6.e4 Bb4+ 7.Nc3 Qa5 8.Bd2 Nc6 9.d5! exd5? (9...Nd4 was necessary.) 10.a3! (see diagram; Black cannot retreat the bishop without losing even more material. If he moves the bishop to anywhere other than d6, White will play 11.Nxd5, and Black cannot defend against the threat against his queen and the c7-pawn. If 10...Bd6, then White plays 11.Nxd5 Qc5 [the only square] 12.Be3 Qa5+ 13.b4 and the queen is trapped, and after 13...Nxb4 14.Bd2, White will win a piece in even more favourable circumstances in comparison to the game.) 10...Nd4 11.Bd3 0-0-0 12.axb4 Nxf3+ 13.Qxf3!? (13.Ke2 seems to hold the piece, although the king will be exposed. With the text move, White's attack on Black's queen continues.) 13...Qxa1+ 14.Ke2 Qxb2 15.Rb1 Qa3 16.Nb5 Qa6 17.Qxf7 Qb6 18.Rc1 Nh6 19.Qxg7 dxe4 20.Qxc7+ Qxc7 21.Rxc7+ Kb8 22.Bxe4 1–0

=== Game 5, Chigorin–Steinitz, 0–1 ===
Evans Gambit (C52)
1.e4 e5 2.Nf3 Nc6 3.Bc4 Bc5 4.b4 Bxb4 5.c3 Ba5 6.0-0 Qf6 7.d4 Nge7 8.Bg5 Qd6 9.Qb3 0-0 10.Rd1 Bb6 11.dxe5 Qg6 12.Qa3 Re8 13.Nbd2 d6 14.exd6 cxd6 15.Bf4 Bc5 16.Qc1 Bg4 17.Bg3 Rad8 18.h3?? (White blunders horribly, completely overlooking the pin that the bishop exerts on the f2-pawn.) 18...Bxf3 19.Nxf3 Qxg3 20.Kh1 Qg6 21.Rd3 Qf6 22.Qd2 Ng6 23.Ng5 Nge5 24.Rf3 Nxf3 25.Bxf7+ Qxf7 26.gxf3 Qc4 0–1

=== Game 6, Steinitz–Chigorin, 0–1 ===
Queen's Pawn Game (D02)
1.Nf3 d5 2.d4 Bg4 3.c4 Bxf3 4.gxf3 dxc4 5.e4 e5 6.dxe5 Qxd1+ 7.Kxd1 Nc6 8.f4 Rd8+ 9.Bd2 Bc5 10.Rg1 Nge7 11.Bxc4 Ng6 12.Kc1 Bxf2 13.Rg2 Bb6 14.Nc3 Nd4 15.Nd5 Nf3 16.Nxb6 Nxd2 17.Rxd2 axb6 18.Rxd8+ Kxd8 19.Bxf7 Nxf4 20.Kd2 Rf8 21.Bb3 Ng6 22.e6 Ke7 23.Rg1?! (Steinitz ought to have prevented Black's rook from reaching the 7th rank. 23.Ke3 was in order) 23...Rf2+ 24.Ke3 Rxh2 25.Rg5 Rh3+ 26.Kd4 Rf3 27.Rb5 Nf4 28.a4 (28.Rf5! would have forced Black to be tied down, increasing White's drawing chances) 28...h5 29.a5 h4 30.axb6 c6 31.Rf5 Ne2+ 32.Kc5 Rxf5+ 33.exf5 h3 34.Ba4 h2 35.Bxc6 bxc6 36.b7 h1Q 37.b8Q Qc1+ 0–1

=== Game 7, Chigorin–Steinitz, 1–0 ===
Evans Gambit (C52)
1.e4 e5 2.Nf3 Nc6 3.Bc4 Bc5 4.b4 Bxb4 5.c3 Ba5 6.0-0 Qf6 7.d4 Nge7 8.Bg5 Qd6 9.d5 Nd8 10.Qa4 Bb6 11.Na3 Qg6 12.Bxe7 Kxe7 13.Nxe5 Qf6 14.Nf3 Qxc3 15.e5 c6 16.d6+ Kf8 17.Bb3 h6 18.Qh4 g5 19.Qh5 Qxd3 20.Rad1 Qh7 21.Nc2 Kg7 22.Ncd4 Qg6 23.Qg4 h5 24.Nf5+ Kf8 25.Qxg5 Qxg5 26.Nxg5 h4 27.Kh1 Rh5 28.f4 Ne6 29.g4 hxg3 30.Nxg3 Rh6 31.Nxf7! Kxf7 32.f5 Ke8 33.fxe6 dxe6 34.Ne4 1–0

=== Game 8, Steinitz–Chigorin, 1–0 ===
Steinitz–Chigorin, game 8

Position: a8 black rook, b8 black rook, d7 black bishop, f7 black king, g7 black pawn, a6 black queen, c6 black pawn, d6 white pawn, f6 black pawn, h6 black pawn, a5 black pawn, c5 black bishop, e5 black pawn, f5 white bishop, f4 black knight, g4 white queen, h4 white knight, a3 white pawn, c3 white bishop, e2 white rook, f2 white pawn, g2 white pawn, h2 white pawn, d1 white rook, g1 white king

After 32...Nf4. Can you find White's winning move?

Semi-Slav Defence (D46)
1.Nf3 Nf6 2.d4 d5 3.c4 e6 4.Nc3 c6 5.e3 Bd6 6.Bd3 Nbd7 7.0-0 0-0 8.e4 dxe4 9.Nxe4 Nxe4 10.Bxe4 h6 11.Bc2 Re8 12.Re1 Qf6 13.Bd2 Nf8 14.Bc3 Bd7 15.c5 Bb8 16.d5! Qd8 17.d6 b6 18.b4 f6 19.Qd3 a5 20.a3 e5 21.Nh4 bxc5 22.bxc5 Ba7 23.Rad1 Bxc5 24.Qc4+ Ne6 25.Qe4 Nf8 26.Qc4+ Ne6 27.Bg6 Qb6 28.Re2 Reb8 29.Rb2 Qa7 30.Bf5 Kf7 31.Re2 Qa6 32.Qg4 Nf4 (see diagram) 33.Rxe5! (Black's pieces are on the wrong side of the board, and merely spectate the execution of their monarch.) 33...fxe5 34.Bxe5 g5 35.Bg6+ Kf8 36.Qxd7 Qa7 37.Qf5+ Kg8 38.d7 1–0

=== Game 9, Chigorin–Steinitz, 0–1 ===
Evans Gambit (C52)
1.e4 e5 2.Nf3 Nc6 3.Bc4 Bc5 4.b4 Bxb4 5.c3 Ba5 6.0-0 Qf6 7.d4 Nge7 8.Bg5 Qd6 9.d5 Nd8 10.Qa4 b6 11.Na3 a6 12.Bb3 Bxc3 13.Rac1 Qb4 14.Nb5 Qxb5 15.Qxb5 axb5 16.Rxc3 c5 17.dxc6 Ndxc6 18.Bxe7 Kxe7 19.Bd5 f6 20.Bxc6 dxc6 21.Rxc6 Bd7 22.Rxb6 Rhb8 23.Rxb8 Rxb8 24.Rb1 Bc6 25.Re1 Ra8 26.Re2 Ra4 27.Rb2 Rxe4 28.h3 Kd6 29.Nd2 Ra4 30.f3 f5 31.Kf2 Ra3 32.Nb1 Rd3 33.Ke2 e4 34.Nd2 Ra3 35.fxe4 fxe4 36.Nb1 Rg3 37.Kf2 Rd3 38.Ke2 h5 39.Nd2 Rg3 40.Kf2 Ra3 41.Nf1 Bd5 42.Rxb5 Rxa2+ 43.Ke3 Rxg2 44.Kd4 Bc6 45.Rxh5 Ra2 46.Ne3 Rd2+ 47.Kc4 Bd7 48.Rg5 Be6+ 49.Kb4 Rd4+ 50.Kb5 Rd3 51.Nc4+ Bxc4+ 52.Kxc4 Rd1 53.Rxg7 e3 54.Rb7 Ke5 55.Kc3 Ke4 56.Kc2 Rf1 0–1

=== Game 10, Steinitz–Chigorin, 1–0 ===
Steinitz–Chigorin, game 10

Position: b8 black rook, d8 black king, h8 black rook, c7 black pawn, e7 white rook, f7 black pawn, h7 black pawn, a6 black pawn, b6 black knight, f6 white knight, g6 black pawn, a5 black queen, b5 black pawn, d5 white pawn, d4 white pawn, a3 white pawn, b3 white bishop, f3 white pawn, b2 white pawn, c2 white queen, f2 white pawn, h2 white pawn, c1 white king, d1 white rook

After 25.Rxe7! Steinitz temporarily sacrifices the exchange in order to expose Black's king.

Queen's Gambit Declined, Chigorin Defence (D07)
1.Nf3 d5 2.d4 Bg4 3.c4 Nc6 4.e3 e5 5.Qb3 Bxf3 6.gxf3 exd4 7.cxd5 Ne5 8.exd4 Nd7 9.Nc3 Qe7+ 10.Be3 Qb4 11.Qc2 Ngf6 12.Bb5 Rd8 13.0-0-0 a6 14.Ba4 Be7 15.Rhg1 g6 16.Bh6 b5 17.Bb3 Nb6 18.Rge1 Kd7 19.Bf4 Rc8 20.a3 Qa5 21.Bg5 Ng8 22.Bxe7 Nxe7 23.Ne4 Rb8 24.Nf6+ Kd8 25.Rxe7! (see diagram) Kxe7 26.Qxc7+ Nd7 27.Qxa5 1–0

=== Game 11, Chigorin–Steinitz, 1–0 ===
Evans Gambit (C52)
1.e4 e5 2.Nf3 Nc6 3.Bc4 Bc5 4.b4 Bxb4 5.c3 Ba5 6.0-0 Qf6 7.d4 Nge7 8.Bg5 Qd6 9.d5 Nd8 10.Qa4 b6 11.Na3 a6 12.Bd3 Bxc3 13.Rab1 Bb7 14.Nc4 Qc5 15.Be3 b5 16.Bxc5 bxa4 17.Rfc1 d6 18.Bxd6 cxd6 19.Nxd6+ Kd7 20.Nxb7 Bd4 21.Nxd4 exd4 22.Nxd8 Rhxd8 23.Rb7+ Kd6 24.e5+ Kxd5 25.Rxe7 Rac8 26.Rxc8 Rxc8 27.f3 Rc3 28.Be4+ Kc4 29.Rxf7 Kb4 30.e6 d3 31.Rd7 1–0

=== Game 12, Steinitz–Chigorin, 1–0 ===
Queen's Gambit Declined, Chigorin Defence (D07)
1.Nf3 d5 2.d4 Bg4 3.c4 Nc6 4.e3 e6 5.Nc3 Bb4 6.Bd2 Nge7 7.Bd3 Bf5 8.Bxf5 Nxf5 9.cxd5 exd5 10.Qb3 Bxc3 11.Bxc3 Rb8 12.0-0 0-0 13.Rac1 Re8 14.Bd2 Nce7 15.Rc2 c6 16.Rfc1 Ng6 17.Be1 Nfh4 18.Nxh4 Nxh4 19.f3 Nf5 20.Bf2 Qg5 21.Re1 Re6 22.e4 Rbe8 23.Rce2 Nd6 24.e5 Qd8 25.Kf1 Nc4 26.Qxb7 Qg5 27.Qb4 Rg6 28.Bg3 h5 29.b3 Nb6 30.Qd2 Qf5 31.Qc2 Qg5 32.Qd2 Qf5 33.Kg1 Nc8 34.Qc2 Qd7 35.Bh4 Nb6 36.Qd3 Na8 37.f4 Nc7 38.Bf2 Qg4 39.Be3 f5 40.Rf2 Rge6 41.Qe2 Qg6 42.Rf3 Qf7 43.Rg3 Kh7 44.Bf2 Rh6 45.Rc1 Rc8 46.Rgc3 Ne6 47.Qa6 Rg8 48.Rxc6 Nxf4 49.Rxh6+ gxh6 50.Bg3 Rg6 51.Qf1 Ne6 52.Qd3 Rg4 53.h3 Rxd4 54.Qa6 Rd2 55.Be1 Rd4 56.Rc6 Re4 57.Rxe6 Rxe1+ 58.Kh2 Rc1? (58...Qg7 and Black is still in the game.) 59.Rf6 Qg7 60.Qe6 Rf1 61.Rf7 1–0

=== Game 13, Chigorin–Steinitz, 1–0 ===
Evans Gambit (C52)
1.e4 e5 2.Nf3 Nc6 3.Bc4 Bc5 4.b4 Bxb4 5.c3 Ba5 6.0-0 Qf6 7.d4 Nge7 8.d5 Nd8 9.Bg5 Qd6 10.Qa4 f6 11.Bc1 Bb6 12.Na3 c6 13.Bb3 Bc5 14.Rd1 b5 15.Qa5 Nb7 16.Qa6 Nd8 17.Qa5 Nb7 18.Qa6 Nd8 19.Qa5 Nb7 20.Qa6 Qc7 21.dxc6 dxc6 22.Nxb5 cxb5 23.Qxb5+ Bd7 24.Bf7+ Kd8 25.Rb1 Nd6 26.Qb3 Qb6 27.Qc2 Qc6 28.Bb3 a5 29.Be3 Bxe3 30.fxe3 a4 31.Bd5 Nxd5 32.Rxd5 Re8 33.Rbd1 Re6 34.c4 Ra7 35.c5 Nc8 36.Nd2 Ke8 37.Nc4 Re7 38.Qe2 a3 39.Qh5+ g6 40.Qh4 Ra4? (This spoils Black's advantage.) 41.Rd6 Nxd6 42.Nxd6+ Kd8 43.Qxf6 Ra5 44.Qf8+ Re8 45.Nxe8 Qxc5 46.Qxc5? (46.Qh8! is a much quicker way of winning, e.g. 46...Qe7 47.Nf6+ Kc7 48.Nxd7 and White is material ahead, with Black's king horribly exposed.) 46...Rxc5 47.Nf6 Rc7 48.Kf1 Kc8 49.Rxd7 Rxd7 50.Nxd7 Kxd7 51.Ke2 Kc6 52.Kd3 Kb5 53.Kc3 h5 54.Kb3 g5 55.Kxa3 Kc4 56.Kb2 Kd3 57.a4 Ke2 58.a5 Kf2 59.a6 Kxg2 60.a7 Kxh2 61.a8Q h4 62.Qg8 h3 63.Qxg5 Kh1 64.Qxe5 1–0

=== Game 14, Steinitz–Chigorin, 1–0 ===
Queen's Gambit Declined, Chigorin Defence (D07)
1.Nf3 d5 2.d4 Bg4 3.c4 Nc6 4.e3 e5 5.Qb3 Bxf3 6.gxf3 Nge7 7.Nc3 exd4 8.Nxd5 Rb8 9.e4 Ng6 10.Bd2 Bd6 11.f4 0-0 12.0-0-0 Nce7 13.f5 Nxd5 14.cxd5 Nf4 15.Qf3 Qh4 16.Rg1 h5 17.Kb1 c5? (This simple tactical oversight leads to the loss of a piece.) 18.Qg3 (This move pins the knight to the now unguarded bishop. Also, the knight has no squares to move to.) 18...Ng6 19.Qxd6 Qxe4+ 20.Ka1 Qxf5 21.Qg3 Qxd5 22.f4 b5 23.Bg2 Qd6 24.Qg5 f5 25.Bh3 Rb6 26.Bxf5 Rf6 27.Be4 Qd7 28.Qxh5 Nf8 29.Qxc5 Ne6 30.Qh5 Qd6 31.Qh7+ Kf8 32.Rc1 Ra6 33.f5 Nc5 34.Qh8+ Ke7 35.Rxg7+ 1–0

=== Game 15, Chigorin–Steinitz, 0–1 ===
Evans Gambit (C52)
1.e4 e5 2.Nf3 Nc6 3.Bc4 Bc5 4.b4 Bxb4 5.c3 Ba5 6.0-0 Qf6 7.d4 Nge7 8.d5 Nd8 9.Qa4 Bb6 10.Bg5 Qd6 11.Na3 c6 12.Rad1 Qb8 13.Bxe7 Kxe7 14.d6+ Kf8 15.Nxe5 f6 16.Nf3 Bc5 17.e5 b5 18.Bxb5 cxb5 19.Nxb5 Ne6 20.exf6 gxf6 21.Qh4 Kf7 22.Qh5+ Kg8 23.Qg4+ Kf7 24.Qh5+ Kg7 25.Nfd4 Bxd4 26.Nxd4 Rf8 27.Rd3 Bb7 28.Nxe6+ dxe6 29.Rh3 Be4 30.Qg4+ Bg6 31.Qxe6 Qb6 32.Qd5 Rad8 33.Rd1 Rfe8 34.c4 Rxd6! (Exploiting White's weak back rank.) 35.Qf3 Rd3 36.Qg4 Re4 0–1

=== Game 16, Steinitz–Chigorin, 1–0 ===
Dutch Defence (A84)
1.Nf3 f5 2.d4 e6 3.c4 Nf6 4.e3 Be7 5.Nc3 0-0 6.Bd3 d5 7.Bd2 c6 8.c5 Nbd7 9.Ng5 Nb8 10.f3 Qc7 11.Qc2 Nh5 12.Nh3 Bh4+ 13.Nf2 e5 14.dxe5 Qxe5 15.0-0 Be7 16.Ne2 b6 17.cxb6 axb6 18.Nd4 c5 19.Nb5 Nc6 20.Bc3 Qb8 21.Rfd1 Ne5 22.Be2 Nf6 23.Nh3 Rd8 24.Bf1 Nf7 25.Nf4 d4 26.Bd2 dxe3 27.Bxe3 Rxd1 28.Rxd1 Qe5 29.Re1 Kf8 30.Bd2 Qb8 31.Qb3 Nd8 32.Qe3 Qb7 33.Bc4 Qd7 34.Bc3 Ra4 35.Bb3 Ra8 36.Nd5 Nxd5 37.Bxd5 Ra4 38.Bxg7+ Kxg7 39.Qxe7+ Qxe7 40.Rxe7+ Kf6 41.Rxh7 Rb4 42.Nd6 Be6 43.Bxe6 Kxe6 44.Rh6+ Ke5 45.b3 b5 46.f4+ Kd4 47.Nxb5+ Rxb5 48.Rd6+ Kc3 49.Rxd8 Ra5 50.Rd5 Kb4 51.Rd2 Kc3 52.Re2 1–0

=== Game 17, Chigorin–Steinitz, ½–½ ===
Evans Gambit (C52)
1.e4 e5 2.Nf3 Nc6 3.Bc4 Bc5 4.b4 Bxb4 5.c3 Ba5 6.0-0 Qf6 7.d4 Nge7 8.d5 Nd8 9.Qa4 Bb6 10.Bg5 Qd6 11.Na3 c6 12.Rad1 Qb8 13.Bxe7 Kxe7 14.d6+ Kf8 15.Qb4 f6 16.Bb3 g6 17.Nc4 Kg7 18.a4 Nf7 19.Nxb6 axb6 20.Bxf7 Kxf7 21.Nxe5+ Kg7 22.Nc4 b5 23.axb5 Qa7 24.b6 Qa4 25.Qc5 Re8 26.f3 Qa2 27.Ne3 Qb3 28.Rb1 Qf7 29.Nc4 Ra4 30.Rb4 Ra2 31.Qd4 Kg8 32.Ne3 Ra3 33.Ra4 Rb3 34.Rfa1 Kg7 35.Ra8 Rb5 36.Rb8 c5 37.Qd5 Rxb6 38.Raa8 Qf8 39.Nc4 Rc6 40.f4 b5 41.Rxb5 Ba6 42.Rxe8 Qxe8 43.Rxc5 Rxc5 44.Qxc5 Qxe4 45.Ne3 Qxf4 46.h3 Bb7 47.c4 Bc6 48.Qa3 Qd4 49.Kh2 f5 50.c5 f4 51.Nc2 Qe5 52.Qa1 Qxa1 53.Nxa1 Kf6 54.Nc2 Ke5 55.Nb4 Bb7 56.Kg1 Kd4 57.c6 Bc8 58.cxd7 Bxd7 59.Kf2 Ke5 60.Nd3+ Kxd6 61.Nxf4 Ke5 62.Ke3 Kf6 63.Nd3 h6 64.Kf4 g5+ 65.Ke3 h5 66.Nc5 Bc6 67.g3 h4 68.g4 Bg2 69.Ne4+ Bxe4 70.Kxe4 Ke6 ½–½
