= Karol Piltz =

Polish chess player (1903–1939)

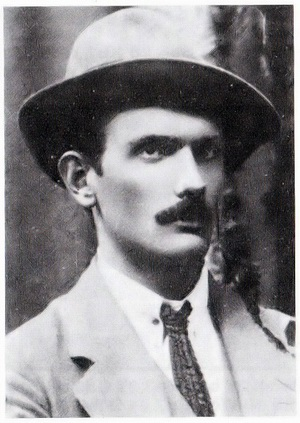

Karol Piltz (1903–1939) was a Polish chess master who played for Poland in the 1st unofficial Chess Olympiad at Paris 1924, tied for 3rd-7th in the 1st Polish Chess Championship at Warsaw 1926 (Dawid Przepiórka won), and tied for 17-18th at Jurata 1937 (4th POL-ch, Savielly Tartakower won).

Piltz, along with other members of the Warsaw team, including Abram Blass, Rafał Feinmesser, Paulin Frydman, Stanisław Kohn, Leon Kremer, Henryk Pogorieły, won a gold medal in the 1st Polish Team Championship at Królewska Huta 1929.

He died during the Siege of Warsaw in September 1939.

He won approximately 46.2% of the games he played, and played Alekhine's Defence in approximately 15.39% of his games.
