= Izaak Towbin =

Polish chess player and organizer

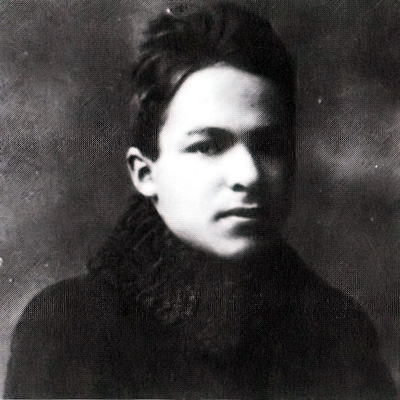

Izaak Towbin (1899, Korets, Volhynia – 1941, Warsaw) was a Polish chess master and organizer.

Born in Korets, Ukraine (then Russian Empire) into a Jewish family, he entered a gymnasium in Kiev (1910–1918) and then Kiev University. In the early 1920s, he moved to Warsaw where graduated in law from the university, and started his chess career.

Towbin was one of fifteen delegates from throughout the world who signed the proclamation act of the International Chess Federation (originally known as Fédération Internationale des Échecs in French) during 1st unofficial Chess Olympiad at Paris 1924.

He played in several tournaments in Warsaw, and tied for 5–7th in 1922 (the 1st Academic Chess Championship), shared 3rd in 1925 (Stanisław Kohn won), took 9th in 1926 (Abram Blass and Paulin Frydman won), tied for 8–9th in 1926/27 (Leon Kremer and Kohn won), and took 4th in 1929. He also tied for 3rd–4th at Łódź 1927.

During World War II, he lived and died in Warsaw, a victim of the Holocaust.
