= 1916 in chess =

Events in chess in 1916:

== Chess events in brief ==
- The 1st Isaac Rice Memorial Tournament – fourteen participants played in New York City, from January 18 to February 4, 1916. Wealthy German–American inventor Isaac Leopold Rice (1850–1915) was a lover of chess (Rice Gambit) and a patron of chess competitions. The event included two stages (preliminaries and final). The preliminaries started as a round-robin tournament. Five players qualified for the final. José Raúl Capablanca played superior chess in the preliminaries. Since the results of the preliminaries carried over into the finals, Capablanca with a 3½-point lead was a heavy favorite to win the tournament. Dawid Janowski, Boris Kostić and Abraham Kupchik tied for 2nd-4th, and Oscar Chajes took 5th place. The final tournament was won by Chajes (who beat Capablanca) and Janowski, ahead of Capablanca, Kostić and Kupchik. Summary, the winner was Capablanca (+12 –1 =4), followed by Janowski 11 points, Chajes 10½ points, Kostić and Kupchik 10 points each.

== Tournaments ==
- Triberg chess tournament (Triangular), won by Efim Bogoljubow ahead of Ilya Rabinovich and Alexey Selezniev, 1915/16.
- London (the 26th London championship), won by Theodor Germann and Edward Guthlac Sergeant, 1915/16.
- New York City (Rice Memorial), won by José Raúl Capablanca followed by Dawid Janowski, Oscar Chajes, Boris Kostić and Abraham Kupchik, 18 January – 4 February.
- New York City (Manhattan Chess Club Championship), won by Kupchik.
- Vancouver (the 1st British Columbia Championship), won by John Ewing, finished 25 February.
- Warsaw won by Moishe Lowtzky and Akiba Rubinstein, followed by Jan Kleczyński, Jr., Zdzisław Belsitzmann and Alexander Flamberg, March.
- Chicago (the 17th Western Chess Association), won by Edward Lasker ahead of Jackson Whipps Showalter, finished 23 August.
- Milan (the 1st Torneo Nazionale Crespi) won by Arturo Reggio ahead of G. Cenni and A. Dolci.
- Triberg won by I. Rabinovich ahead of E. Bogoljubow and A. Selezniev.
- Amsterdam won by Max Marchand ahead of Adolf Georg Olland.
- Copenhagen (the 9th Nordic Chess Championship), won by Paul Johner ahead of Orla Hermann Krause, Otto von Löwenborg and M. Marchand.
- Copenhagen (Nordic-ch, B-tournament), won by Karl Berndtsson ahead of O. Nilsson.
- Stockholm won by Gustaf Nyholm ahead of E. Jakobson.
- London (the 27th London championship), won by E.G. Sergeant.
- Brno won by Julius Brach ahead of J. Dobiaš.
- Brno won by J. Dobiaš followed by F. Nachtikal, J. Brach and J. Rašovsky.
- Běluň won by Karel Opočenský ahead of Jan Schulz.
- Budapest (Quadrangular), won by Gyula Breyer followed by Zoltán von Balla, Richard Réti, Johannes Esser.
- Vienna (the 8th Leopold Trebitsch Memorial Tournament) (Trianglular), won by Carl Schlechter ahead of Milan Vidmar and Arthur Kaufmann, 1916/17.
- Łódź won by A. Rubinstein ahead of Gersz Salwe and Teodor Regedziński, 1916/17.

== Matches ==
- Emanuel Lasker beat Siegbert Tarrasch (+5 –0 =1) in Berlin.
- Akiba Rubinstein won against Moishe Lowtzky (+2 –0 =1), play-off in Warsaw.
- Edward Guthlac Sergeant beat Theodor Germann (+2 –0 =0), play-off in London.
- Arthur Kaufmann defeated Savielly Tartakower (+2 –0 =2) in Vienna.
- Alexander Alekhine won against Alexander Evensohn (+2 –1 =0) in Kiev.
- Siegbert Tarrasch defeated Jacques Mieses (+7 –2 =4) in Berlin; prize was 1/2 pound of butter.

== Births ==
- 7 January - Paul Keres born in Narva, Estonia. EST-ch 1935,42,42,45,53. GM 1950.
- 4 February - Octav Troianescu born in Romania. ROU-ch 1946,54,56,57. IM 1950.
- 6 May - Povilas Tautvaišas born in Lithuania.
- 11 May - Osmo Ilmari Kaila born in Helsinki, Finland; twice FIN-ch 1939, 1954. IM 1952.
- 15 May - Vincenzo Castaldi born in Marradi, Italy; seven times ITA-ch. IM 1950.
- 20 August - Paul Felix Schmidt born in Narva, Estonia; twice EST-ch 1936, 1937 and GER-ch 1941. IM 1950.
- 3 September - Alexander Koblencs born in Riga, Latvia. LAT-ch 1941,45,46,49. IM.
- 16 September - Vernon Dilworth born in England. Dilworth variation.
- 18 November - Miguel Cuéllar Gacharná born in Colombia; eight times COL-ch, IM 1957.

== Deaths ==
- 5 July - Friedrich Köhnlein died in the Battle of Somme, France.
- 26 July - Henry Charlick died in Adelaide, Australia, the 1st AUS-ch 1887.
- 2 October - Robert Henry Barnes died in New Zealand.
- 27 December - Hugo Süchting died in Valluhn, Germany.
