= Rafał Feinmesser =

Polish chess player

Rafał Feinmesser (1895 – ?) was a Polish chess master.

He was murdered in the Holocaust in Warszawa.

He played several times in the Warsaw championships. He tied for 5-6th in 1926 (Abram Blass and Paulin Frydman won), tied for 6-7th in 1927 (Stanisław Kohn and Leon Kremer won), took 10th in 1928 (Blass won), tied for 5-6th in 1929 (Kremer won), tied for 10-11th in 1930 (Frydman won).

Feinmesser, along with other members of the Warsaw team (Blass, Frydman, Kohn, Kremer, Karol Piltz, Henryk Pogorieły) won the gold medal in the 1st Polish Team Championship at Królewska Huta 1929.

== See also ==
- List of Jewish chess players
