= Kazimierz Makarczyk =

Polish chess player (1901–1972)

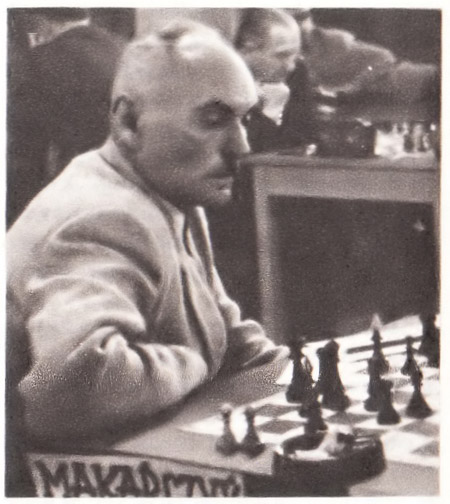

Kazimierz Makarczyk (1 January 1901, Warsaw – 27 May 1972, Łódź) was a Polish chess master.

In 1922, he took 3rd in Warsaw (Academic-ch). In 1926, he finished 10th in the 1st Polish chess championship played in Warsaw. The event was won by Dawid Przepiórka. In 1927, he took 3rd, behind Akiba Rubinstein and Savielly Tartakower, in Łódź (2nd POL-ch). In 1927, he tied for 2nd–3rd in Warsaw (Stanisław Kohn won). In 1928, he tied for 2nd–3rd in Warsaw (Abram Blass won). In 1929, he tied for 3rd–4th in Warsaw (Leon Kremer won). In 1930, he took 2nd, behind Paulin Frydman in Warsaw. In 1930, he won (4½–3½) a match against Teodor Regedziński in Łódź. In 1935, he tied for 8th–9th in Warsaw (3rd POL-ch). The event was won by Tartakower. In 1937, he took 7th in Bad Saarow.

Makarczyk played for Poland in five official and one unofficial Chess Olympiads.

- In 1928, he played at first board at 2nd Chess Olympiad in The Hague (+5 −5 =6).
- In 1930, he played at fourth board at 3rd Chess Olympiad in Hamburg (+5 −3 =5).
- In 1931, he played at fourth board at 4th Chess Olympiad in Prague (+5 −1 =6).
- In 1933, he played at reserve board at 5th Chess Olympiad in Folkestone (+4 −2 =7).
- In 1935, he played at reserve board at 6th Chess Olympiad in Warsaw (+6 −1 =7).
- In 1936, he played at second board at 3rd unofficial Chess Olympiad in Munich (+6 −7 =5).

He won five team medals: one gold (1930), two silver (1931, 1936), and two bronze (1928, 1935).

After World War II, he lived in Łódź. In 1946, he tied for 10–11th in Sopot (5th POL-ch). The event was won by Bogdan Śliwa. In 1948, Makarczyk won in Kraków (6th POL-ch). In January 1949, he lost 0:2 against Jan Foltys in a Poland–Czechoslovakia match in Katowice. In July 1949, he lost 0:2 against László Szabó in a Poland–Hungary match in Warsaw. In 1949, he tied for 13–14th in Poznań (7th POL-ch). In 1950, he took 3rd in Bielsko (8th POL-ch). In 1951, he tied for 9th–10th in Łódź (9th POL-ch). In 1951, he took 5th in Sopot (Erno Gereben won). In 1952, he tied for 3rd–4th with József Szily, behind Zdravko Milev and Ion Bălănel, in Miedzyzdroje. In 1952, he tied for 1st with Śliwa in Katowice (10th POL-ch), but lost a play-off.

Makarczyk did not play in the 10th Chess Olympiad at Helsinki 1952, because of a decision by the Polish chess authorities.

In 1953, he tied for 3rd–5th in the 11th Polish Chess Championship played in Kraków. In 1954, he tied for 6th–7th in Łódź (12th POL-ch).

Makarczyk was awarded the IM title in 1950. From 1954, he was a chess trainer.
