= Moishe Lowtzky =

Ukrainian-Polish chess player

Moishe Lowtzky (Polish: Mojżesz Łowcki) (August 12, 1880–1940) was a Ukrainian–Polish chess master.

== Biography ==
He was born into a Jewish family in Kamianets-Podilskyi (now Ukraine). In 1903, Lowtzky tied for 6-7th with Eugene Znosko-Borovsky in Kyiv (3rd RUS-ch). The event was won by Mikhail Chigorin. In 1903, he took 4th in Dresden (Paul Saladin Leonhardt won). In 1904, he tied for 2nd-3rd in Coburg (14th DSB Congress, Hauptturnier). In 1910, he tied for 1st with Thoenes in Hamburg. In 1910, he took 3rd in Hamburg (Zsigmond Barász won). In 1910, he tied for 1st-3rd with Leonhardt and Mörig in Leipzig. In 1911, he won in Cologne (Masters tournament). In 1911, he took 2nd, behind Hans Fahrni, in San Remo. In 1911, he took 2nd in Leipzig (Valentiner won). In 1912, he took 5th in Abbazia (Rudolf Spielmann won). In 1912, he took 16th in Breslau (18th DSB–Congress). The event was won by Oldřich Duras and Akiba Rubinstein. In 1912, he took 12th in Pistyan (Pöstyén, Piešťany). The event was won by Rubinstein. In 1913, he took 3rd in Warsaw (Alexander Flamberg won). In 1913/14, he took 4th in Sankt Petersburg (8th RUS-ch). The event was won by Alexander Alekhine and Aron Nimzowitsch.

During World War I, Lowtzky moved to Warsaw. In 1916, he shared 1st with Rubinstein but lost a playoff match (0.5 : 2.5) to him. In 1917, he took 2nd, behind Rubinstein. In 1919, he took 8th (Zdzisław Belsitzmann won). In 1924, he tied for 1st with Flamberg. In 1925, he tied for 3rd-5th (Stanisław Kohn won). In 1926, he took 3rd (Abram Blass and Paulin Frydman won). In 1926, he tied for 3rd-7th in Warsaw (1st POL-ch). The event was won by Dawid Przepiórka. In 1926/27, he took 3rd (Leon Kremer and Kohn won). In 1927, he tied for 11-12th in Łódź (2nd POL-ch). The event was won by Rubinstein. In 1928, he took 5th in Warsaw (Blass won). In 1929, he tied for 3rd-4th in Warsaw (Kremer won). In 1930, he took 4th in Warsaw (P. Frydman won). In 1937, he tied for 11-12th in Jurata (4th POL-ch). The event was won by Savielly Tartakower.

In 1940, Moishe Lowtzky was arrested in Warsaw, and died in a Nazi concentration camp.

== Notable chess games ==
- Moishe Lowtzky vs Akiba Rubinstein, Kiev 1903, 3rd RUS-ch, Queen's Gambit Declined, Alapin Variation, D31, 1-0
- Gersz Rotlewi vs Moishe Lowtzky, Cologne 1911, Queen's Gambit Declined, Tarrasch Variation, D34, 0-1
- Moishe Lowtzky vs Efim Bogoljubow, St Petersburg 1913/14, Queen's Gambit Declined, Modern Variation, D55, 1-0

== See also ==
- List of Jewish chess players
