= Henryk Pogorieły =

Polish chess player

Henryk Pogorieły (1908 in Warsaw – 1943 in Warsaw) was a Polish chess master.

He took 4th in the Warsaw Championship in 1928. Pogorieły, along with other members of the Warsaw team (Abram Blass, Rafał Feinmesser, Paulin Frydman, Stanisław Kohn, Leon Kremer, Karol Piltz) won a gold medal in the 1st Polish Team Championship at Królewska Huta 1929.

Pogorieły took 3rd at Warsaw 1936, and played for Poland at seventh board (+10 –3 =7) in 3rd unofficial Chess Olympiad at Munich 1936. He won the team a silver medal and a bronze individual medal there.

In 1939, he tied for 6-7th in Warsaw, and tied for 5-8th in Margate (B tournament). In February–April 1942, he participated in a chess tournament in the Warsaw Ghetto, and won scoring 13/14. In Spring 1943, he was murdered in Pawiak prison.
