= Jan Kleczyński =

Jan Kleczyński is the name of:

- Jan Kleczyński, Sr. (1837–1895), Polish pianist, composer, music critic, and chess player
- Jan Kleczyński, Jr. (1875–1939), Polish critic and chess player
