= Jan Kleczyński Jr. =

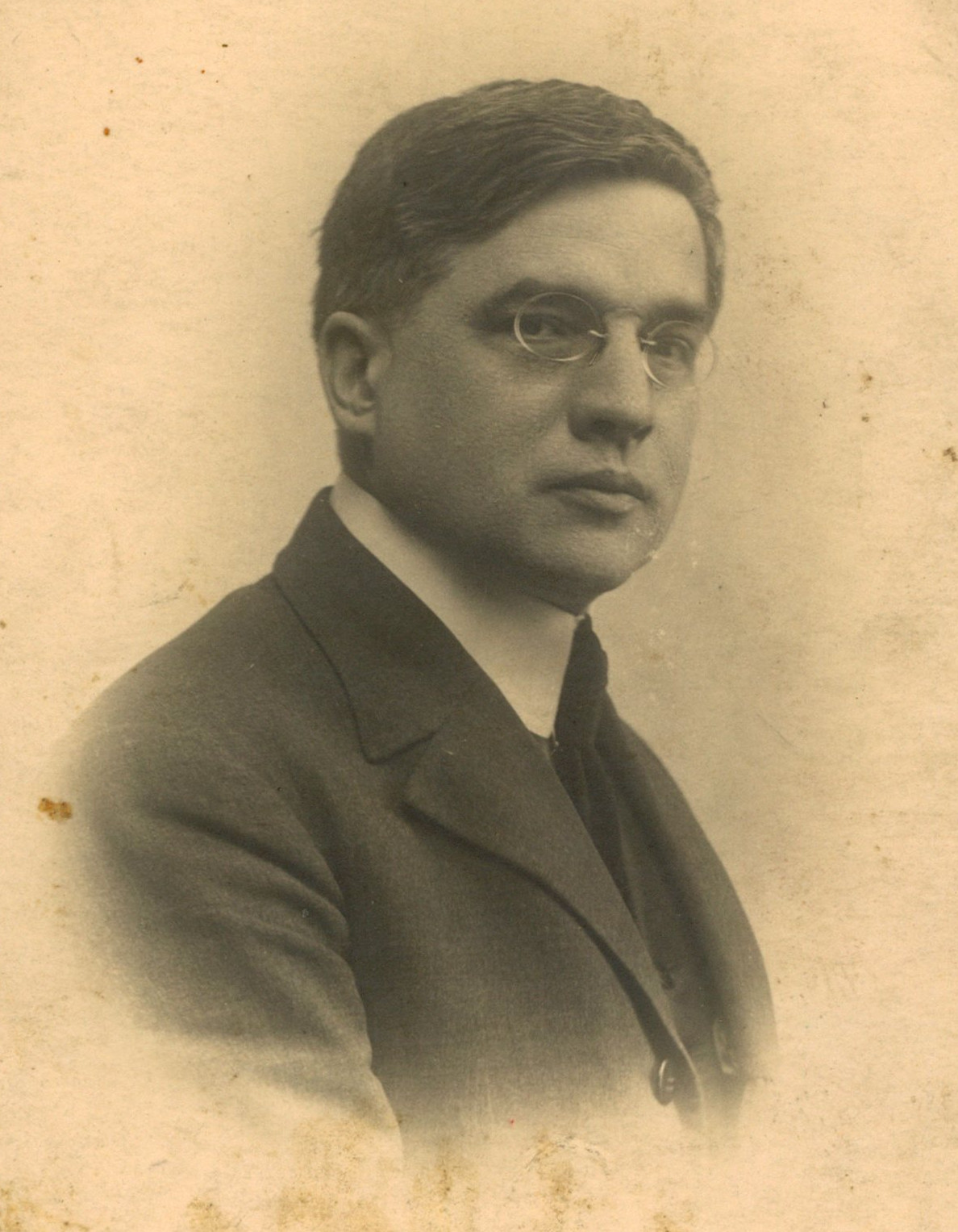
Jan Kleczyński in 1920

Jan Kleczyński (24 June 1875, in Warsaw – September 1939, in Warsaw) was a Polish writer, art critic, journalist and chess master.

He was a son of Jan Kleczyński, Sr., a famous Polish pianist and one of the best Warsaw chess masters of the 19th century. Jan Kleczyński Junior played in Warsaw City Chess Championship (1896, 1897). He finished 4th in 1901 (Alexander Flamberg won), 4th in 1907 (Quadrangular), 2nd in 1908 (Fyodor Duz-Khotimirsky won), tied for 5-6th in 1910, and finished 6th in 1911.

During World War I, he was 3rd in 1916/17, and 6th in 1917 in Warsaw, both won by Akiba Rubinstein. After the war, he was 7th (Zdzisław Belsitzmann won) in 1919/20, 2nd, behind Stanisław Kohn, in 1925, shared 8th in 1926 (Kohn and Leon Kremer won), and tied for 6-8th at Warsaw 1928 (Abram Blass won).

Jan Kleczyński represented Poland in the 1st unofficial Chess Olympiad at Paris 1924. He twice participated in the Polish Championship; was 13th at Warsaw 1926 (the 1st POL-ch, Dawid Przepiórka won), and tied for 14-15th at Lodz 1927 (the 2nd POL-ch, Rubinstein won).

Jan Kleczyński wrote a weekly chess column for Kurier Warszawski (1897–1939). He died of a heart attack during the bombing of Warsaw at the end of September 1939 (World War II).
