= Alfred Christensen =

Alfred Christensen may refer to:

- Alfred Christensen (canoeist) (1914–1996)
- Alfred Christensen (chess player) (1905–1974)
