= Sundberg =

Sundberg is a Swedish surname. It is derived from sund meaning healthy or strait (as in a strait of water) and berg meaning mountain.

== Geographical distribution ==
As of 2014, 54.1% of all known bearers of the surname Sundberg were residents of Sweden (frequency 1:955), 30.4% of the United States (1:62,338), 6.9% of Finland (1:4,190), 2.9% of Norway (1:9,436), 1.9% of Canada (1:99,186) and 1.4% of Denmark (1:21,220).

In Sweden, the frequency of the surname was higher than national average (1:955) in the following counties:

1. Västernorrland County (1:327)
2. Gävleborg County (1:344)
3. Norrbotten County (1:398)
4. Jämtland County (1:475)
5. Dalarna County (1:523)
6. Västerbotten County (1:758)
7. Stockholm County (1:854)
8. Uppsala County (1:877)
9. Gotland County (1:943)

In Finland, the frequency of the surname was higher than national average (1:4,190) in the following regions:

1. Åland (1:211)
2. Uusimaa (1:2,232)
3. Ostrobothnia (1:2,759)
4. Southwest Finland (1:3,104)
5. Kymenlaakso (1:3,798)

== People ==
- Andy Sundberg (1941–2012), advocate for American citizens abroad
- Anne Sundberg, American documentary film-maker
- Anton Niklas Sundberg (1818–1900), Swedish Lutheran archbishop of Uppsala, Sweden
- Arnie Sundberg (1906–1970), American weightlifter who competed in the 1932 Summer Olympics
- Bertil Sundberg (1907–1979), Swedish chess player
- Carl Sundberg, American football coach
- Clinton Sundberg (1903–1987), American actor
- Harry Sundberg, Swedish football/soccer player at the 1924 Paris Olympics
- Ingrid Sundberg (born 1948), Swedish alpine skier
- Jim Sundberg, American major-league baseball player and American League All-Star catcher and Gold Glove Award winner
- Johanna Sundberg (1828–1910), ballerina
- John Sundberg (1920–2004), Swedish sport shooter
- Julius Sundberg (1887–1931), Finnish journalist and politician
- Kaj Sundberg (1924–1993), Swedish diplomat
- Maud Sundberg (1911–2010), Swedish Olympic sprint runner
- Nick Sundberg, American football (NFL) player
- Oliver Sundberg, Danish speedskater
- Per B Sundberg (born 1964), Swedish glass- and ceramic artist
- Peter Sundberg, Swedish car racing
- Ross Sundberg, Australian Federal Court judge
- Ulrika Sundberg, Swedish diplomat

== See also ==
- Phelsuma sundbergi – 3 subgenera of the Phelsuma day gecko from the Seychelles
- Olson Sundberg Kundig Allen Architects – architectural firm based in Seattle, Washington
- Salmenkallio (Sundberg), a district of Helsinki, Finland
