= Adam Mokrysz =

Polish entrepreneur, investor and philanthropist

Adam Mokrysz (born July 25, 1979, in Cieszyn) is a Polish entrepreneur, investor and philanthropist. The son of Teresa and Kazimierz Mokrysz, the founders of Mokate. PhD of economics, CEO of the Mokate Group and Mokate S.A. Expert in the field of business in the FMCG industry. It actively supports the development of local communities and education. A chess fan and their popularization among children and teenagers.

== Education ==
A graduate of Management and Marketing at the University of Economics in Katowice. There he obtained a PhD in Management Science. He has a diploma of the University of London in the field of Foreign Trade. In addition, he completed the post-graduate IMD-AEDP - Accelerated Executive Development Program at the University of Lausanne.

== Career ==
Successor and leader of the MOKATE Group Family Business. He gained his knowledge and skills when working his way up from the basics in the areas of marketing, purchasing and sales. Thanks to his 20 years of experience in the development of B2B and B2C products (retail, brand and international), and his work on the increase of export by reaching the markets of more than 70 countries, today the MOKATE Group is one of the top Polish export producers, and export accounts for 70% of its revenues. In January 2016, he took over as the President of the Group, and is responsible for the development of new business directions, creates and develops company identity. At the international fairs, he is regarded as the leading expert of the FMCG industry from Central Europe.

== Social activity ==
He has been playing chess since he was a kid, and he promotes the game in Poland. He supports the development of local communities with the Polish Chess Federation Polish Chess Federation project entitled “Education through chess in school.” He regularly co-organises chess tournaments and championships following the principle of “MOKATE makes you think,” he is a committed and active partner of the Polish Chess Federation. Adam's long-term goal is to introduce chess to primary schools as an obligatory subject.

== Awards and distinctions ==
- 2011 – The title of “Outstanding Exporter of the Year 2011” awarded to MOKATE by the Minister of Agriculture
- 2011 – The Association of Polish Exporters awarded Mokate Sp. z o.o. in Żory with the title of “Leader of Polish Export of the Year 2011”
- 2013 – “Leader of Polish Export of the Year 2013”
- 2016 – TOP 10 Employers of the Silesian Voivodeship – Silesia HR Trends
- 2016 – “Golden Super Caesar of Silesian Economy”
- 2017 – Distinction in the FOOD MARKET LEADER 2017 competition for achieving a leading position in the domestic market of teas, instant coffee and chocolate drinks, and for successive foreign expansion and product launches on other continents
- 2017 – “Manager of the Year 2017”
- 2018 – Silver Cross of Merit
- 2018 – “Solid Employer of Silesia”
- 2018 – “Polish Brand 2018” Superbrands
- 2018 – “Factory of the Year 2018” in the “Food Industry” category awarded by the editors of the magazine “Inżynieria i Utrzymanie Ruchu and Control Engineering Polska”
- 2018 – “Polish Promoter Title” awarded by the Foundation of the Polish Promotional Emblem “Teraz Polska”
- 2018 – “ENTREPRENEUR MAGNUS 2018 OUTSTANDING ENTREPRENEUR”
- 2018 – “EY Entrepreneur of the Year”
- 2018 – “Special Award for International Expansion” in the EY Entrepreneur of the Year 2018 Competition
- 2019 – “Outstanding Entrepreneur” in the Polish African Business Achievements Awards 2019
- 2019 – “Trusted Employer”
- 2019 – Forbes Family Business Congress – “Family Ambassador of the Year”
- 2019 – Symbol 2019 – “Symbol of Polish Success 2019”
- 2019 – “Investor Without Borders 2019”
- 2020 – 28th Gala of the Laurels of Skills and Competence – “Platinum Laurel of Skills and Competence” of the Regional Chamber of Commerce in Katowice – Adam Mokrysz – President of the Mokate Group and Mokate S.A. Category: PARTICIPATION IN THE GLOBAL MARKET
- 2022 – “BrandMe CEO 2023”
- 2023 – “Economic Award for Small and Medium-sized Enterprises 2023”

== Websites ==
Official website of Mokate

Official website of Dr Adam Mokrysz

Mokate online store
