= List of Jewish chess players =

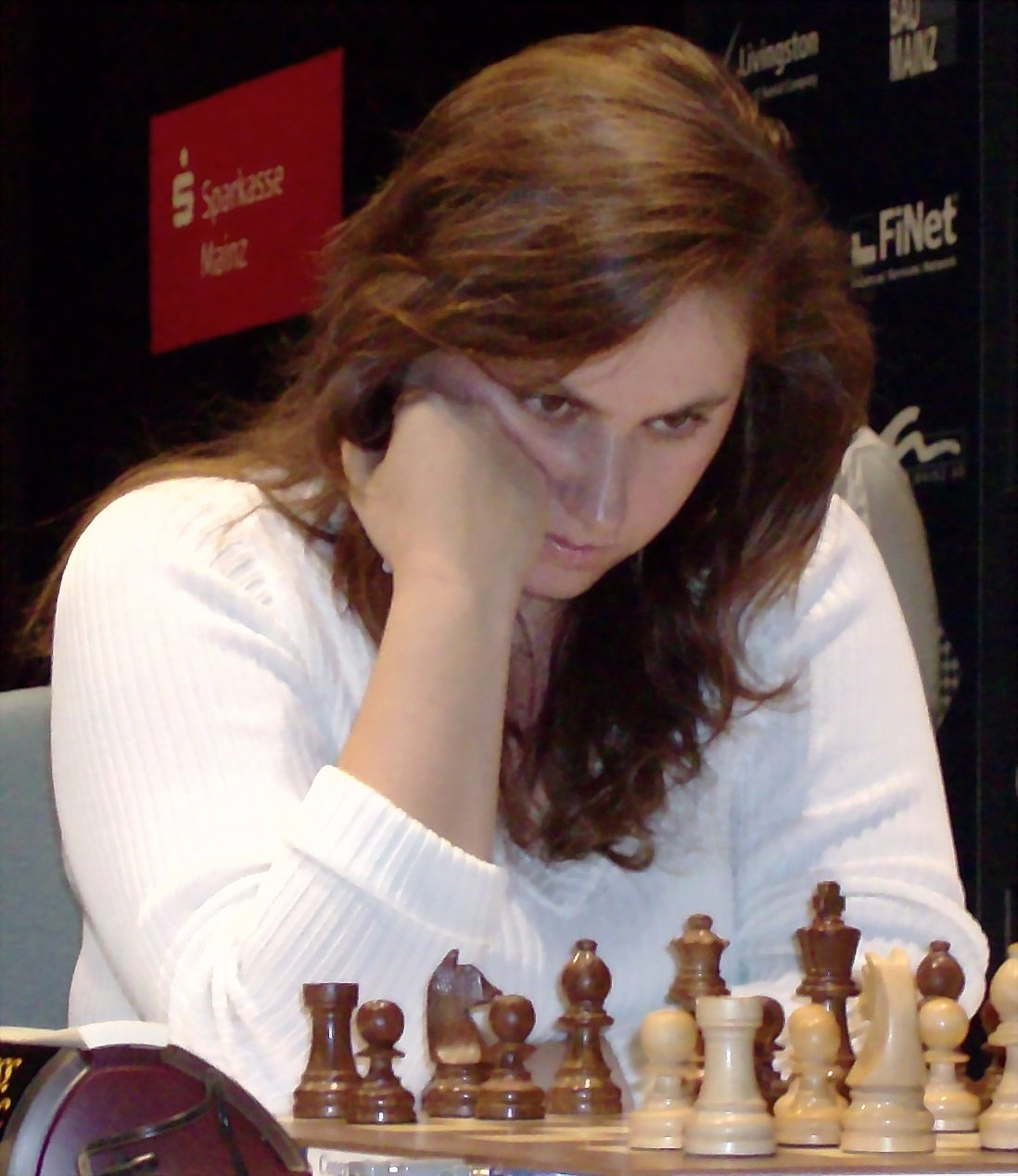
Judit Polgár

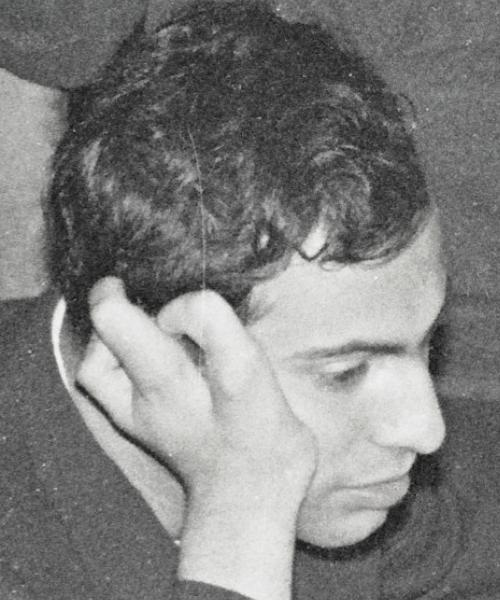
Mikhail Tal

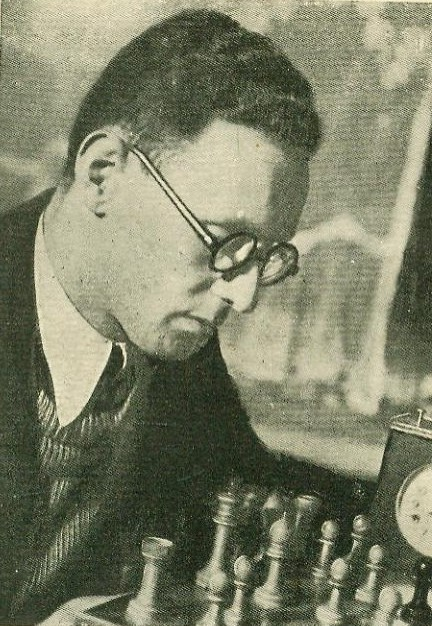
Mikhail Botvinnik

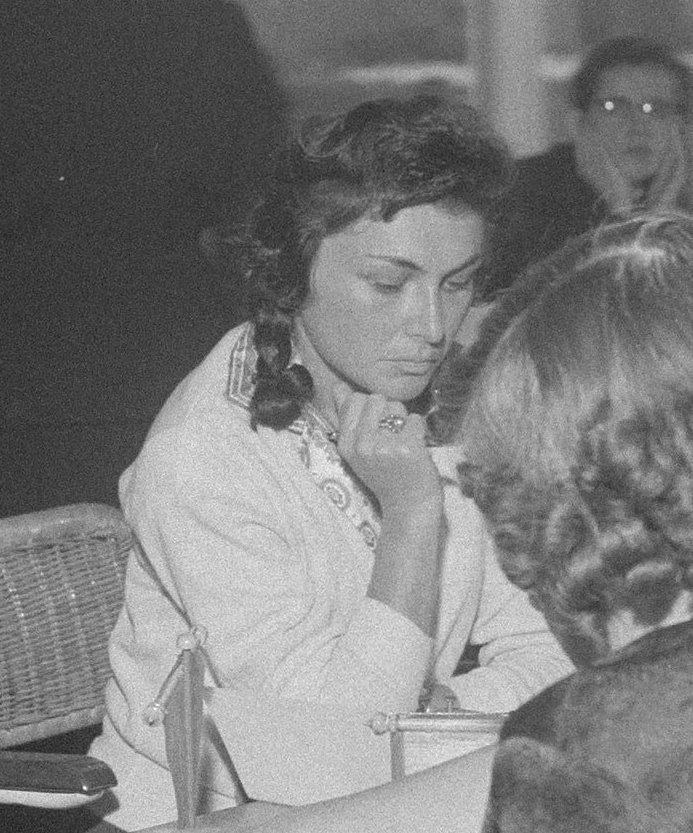
Isabelle Choko

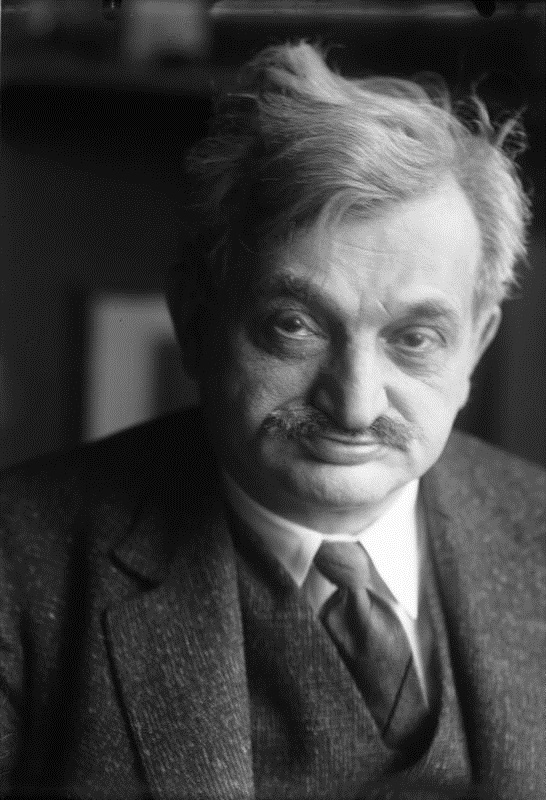
Emanuel Lasker

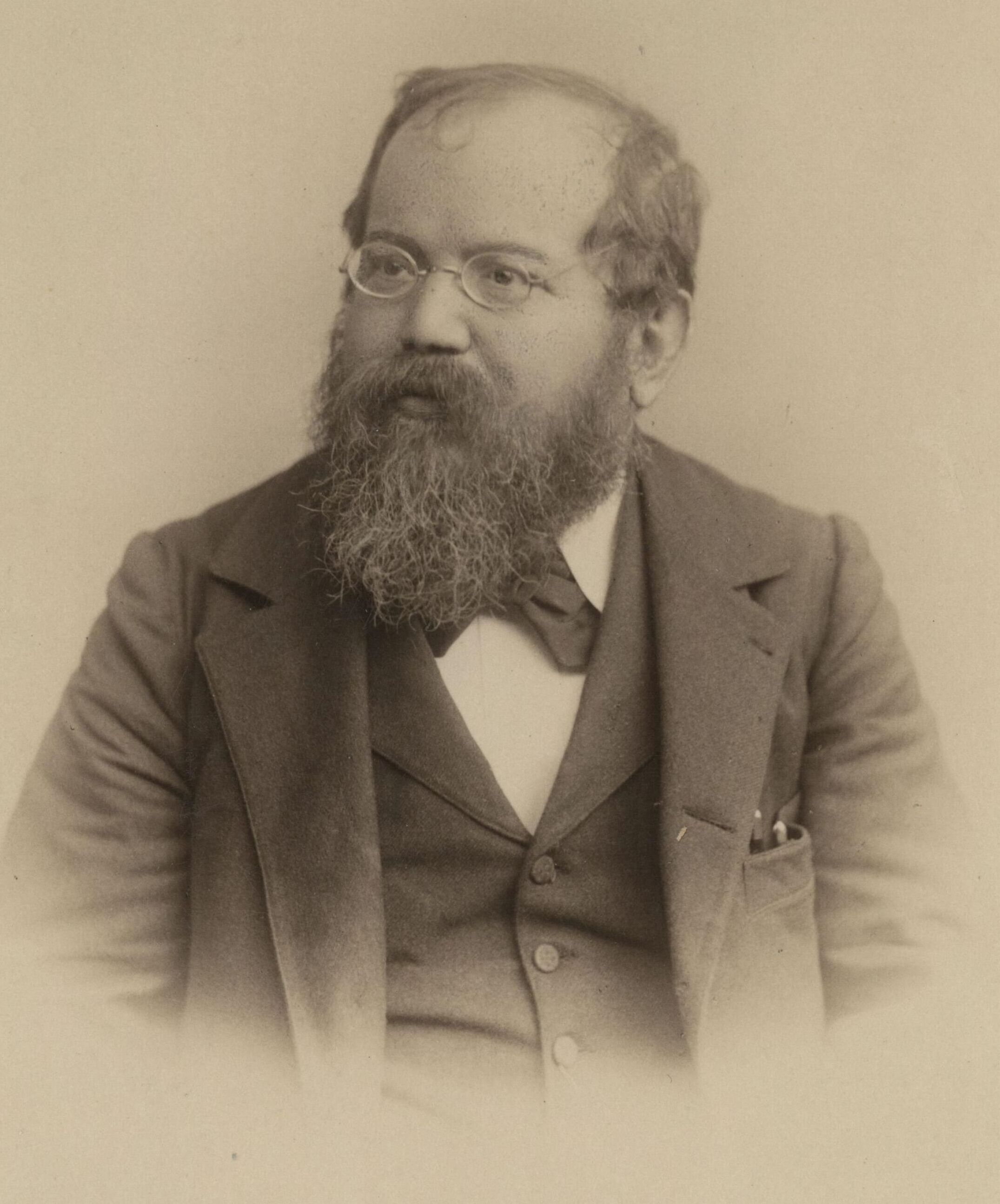
Wilhelm Steinitz

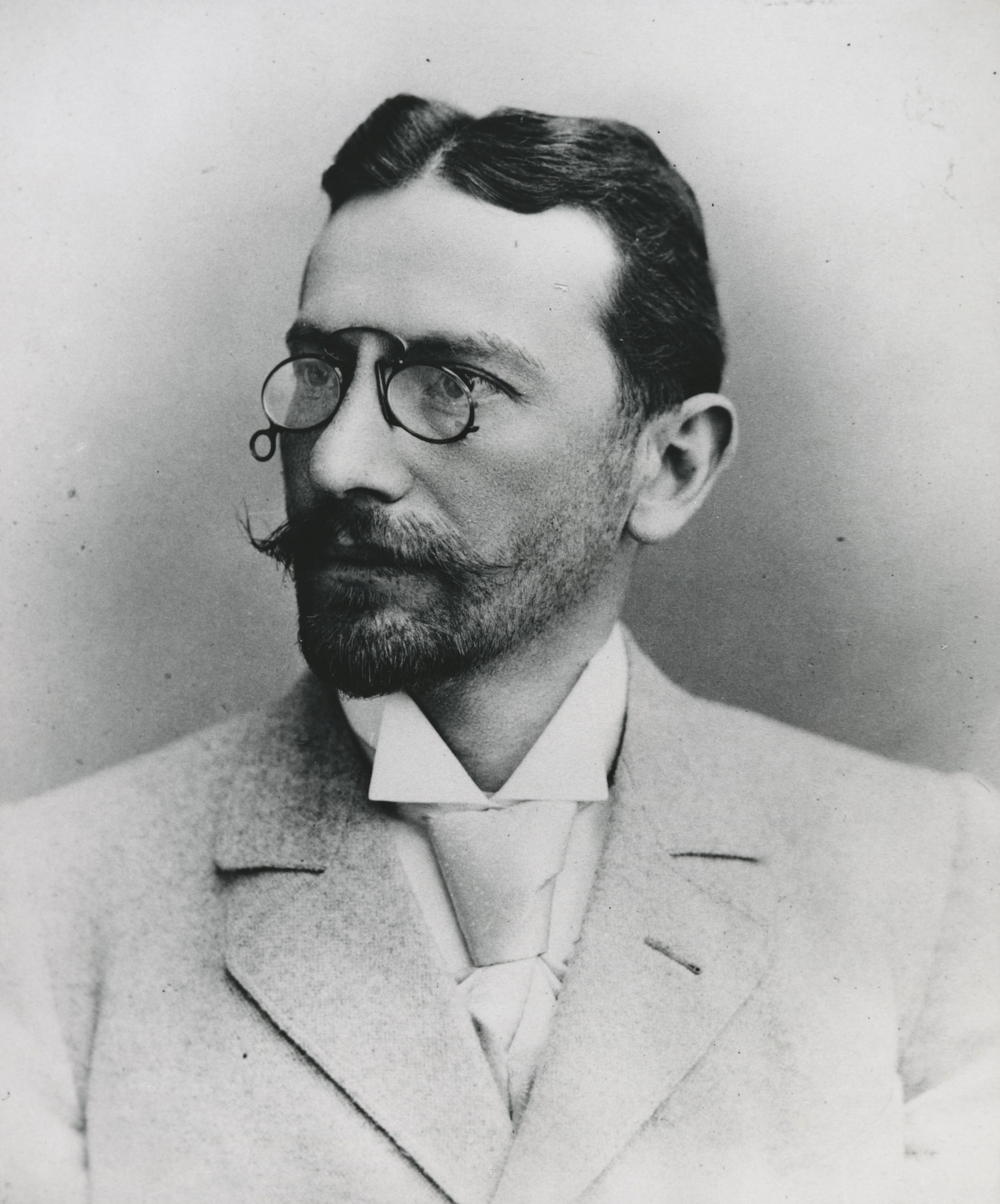
Siegbert Tarrasch

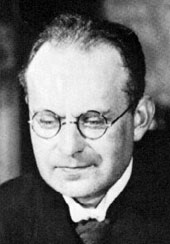
Aron Nimzowitsch

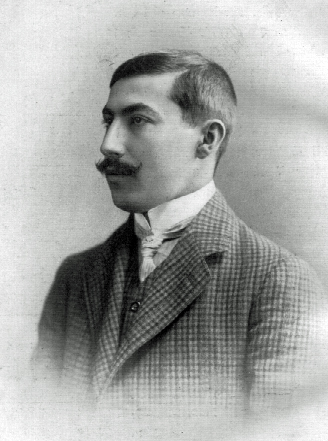
Akiba Rubinstein

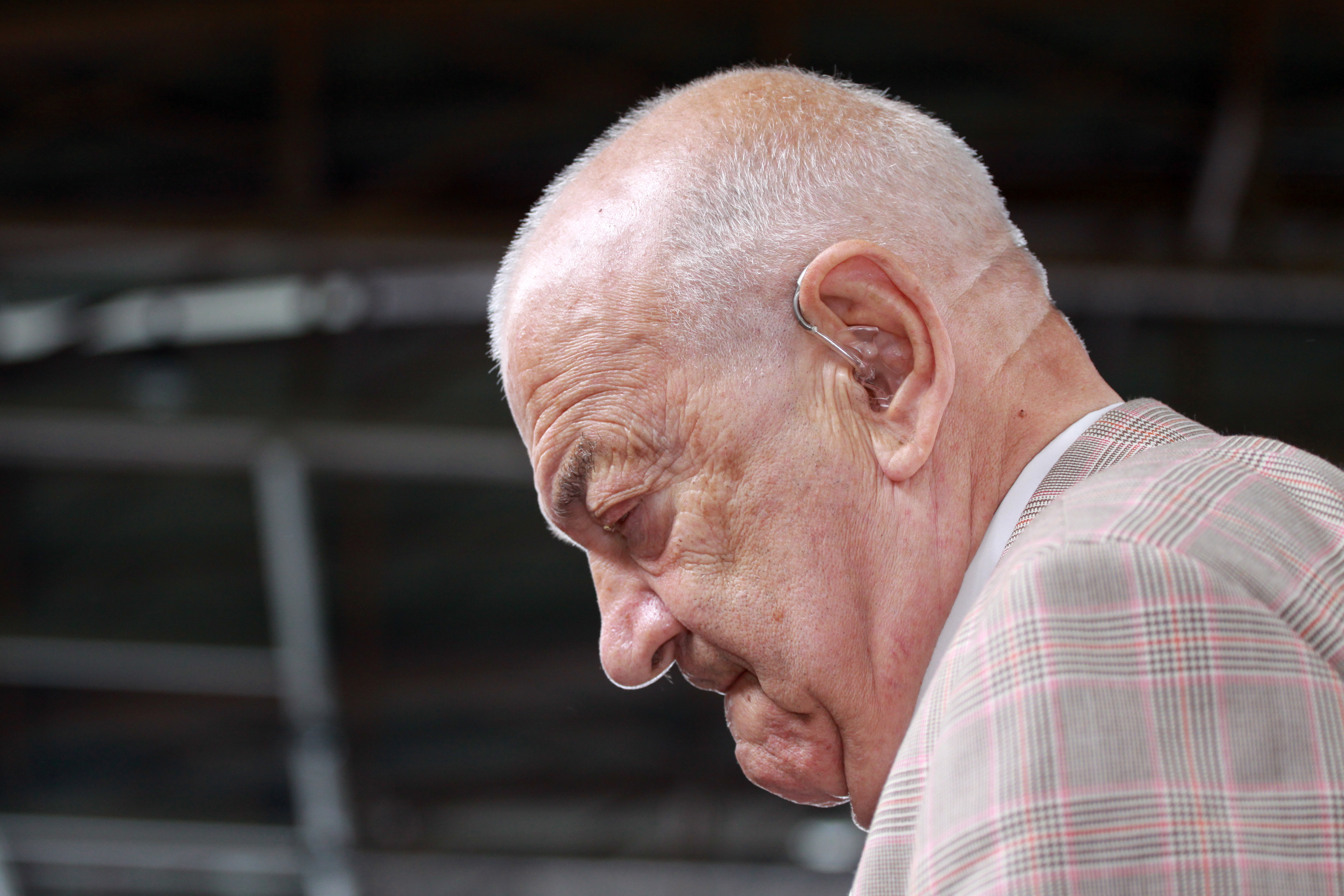
Viktor Korchnoi

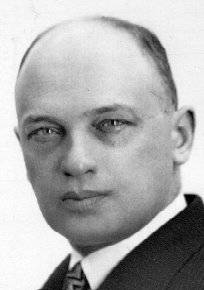
Savielly Tartakower

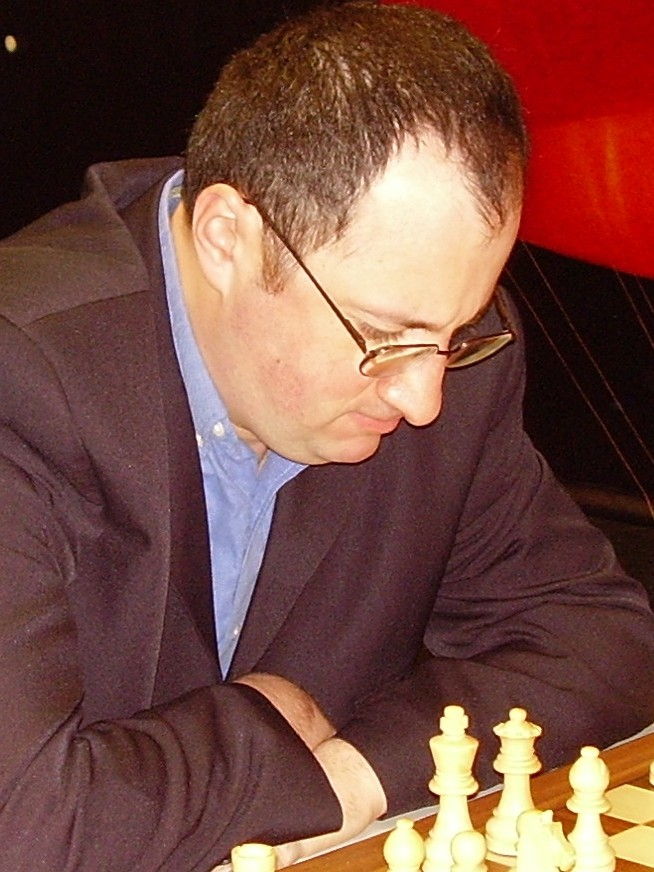
Boris Gelfand

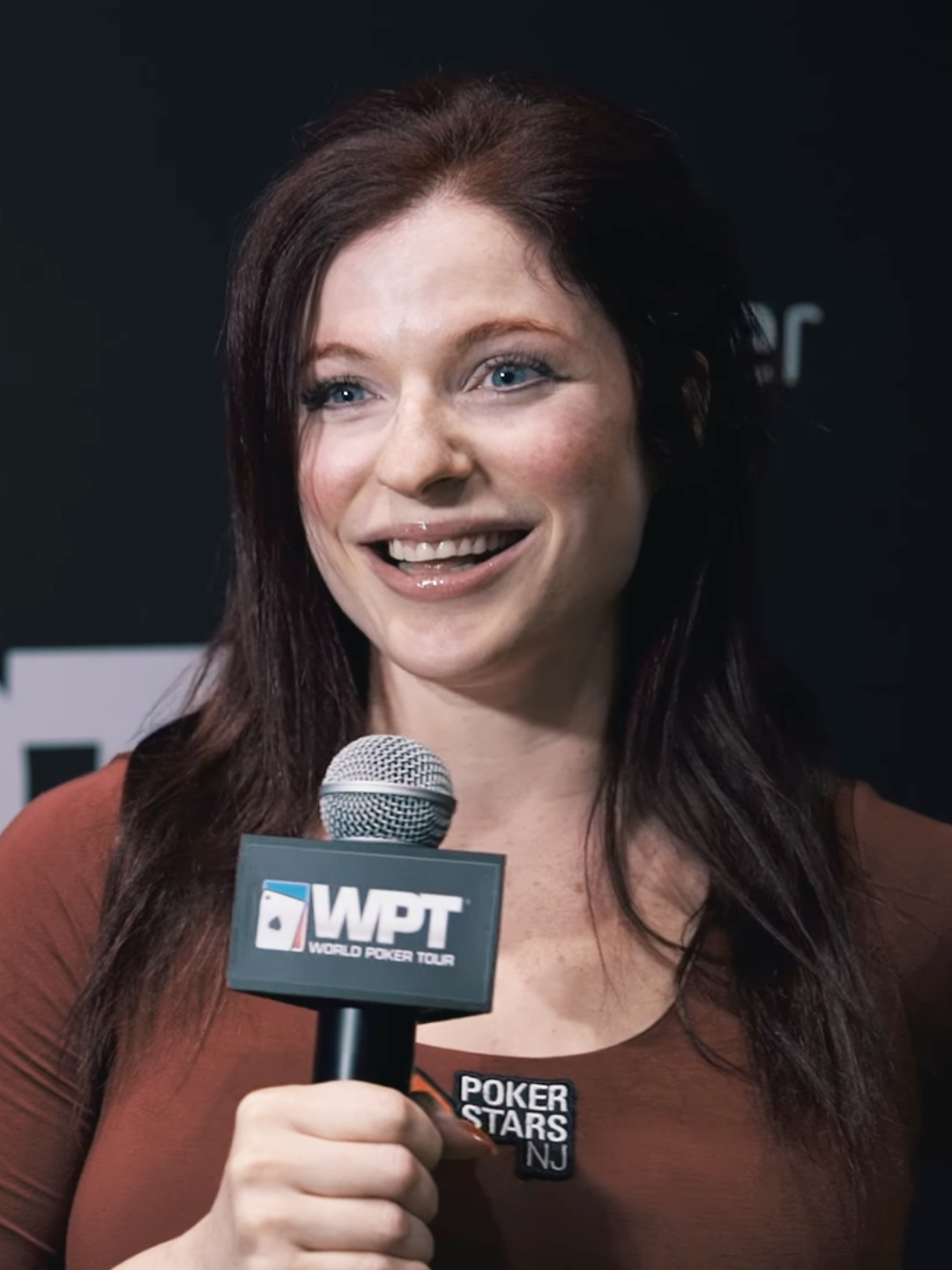
Jennifer Shahade

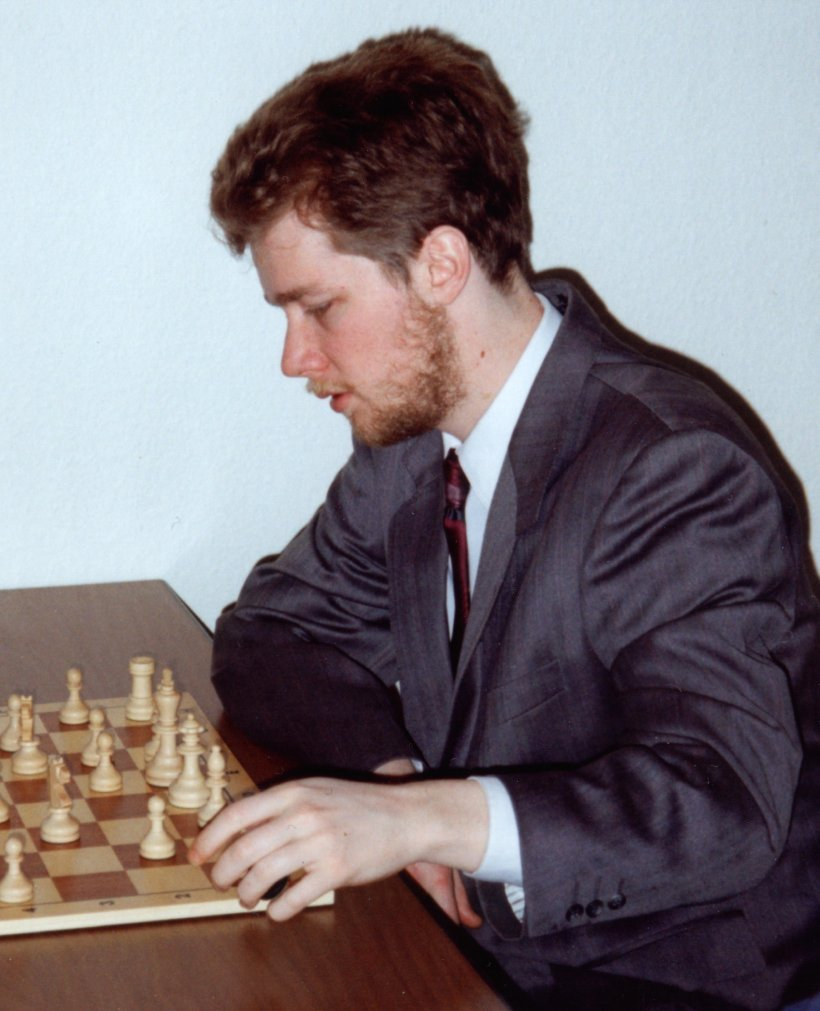
Alexander Khalifman

Jewish players and theoreticians have long been involved in the game of chess and have significantly contributed to the development of chess. Chess gained popularity amongst Jews in the 12th century. The game was privileged by distinguished rabbis, as well as by women.

Of the first 13 undisputed world champions, six were Jewish or had some Jewish ancestry: Wilhelm Steinitz, Emanuel Lasker, Mikhail Botvinnik, Mikhail Tal, Bobby Fischer and Garry Kasparov. The Modern School of Chess espoused by Steinitz and Siegbert Tarrasch, the Hypermodernism influenced by Aron Nimzowitsch and Richard Réti, and the Soviet Chess School promoted by Botvinnik were all strongly influenced by Jewish players. Other influential Jewish chess theoreticians, writers and players include Johannes Zukertort, Savielly Tartakower, Akiba Rubinstein, Gyula Breyer, Rudolf Spielmann, Samuel Reshevsky, Reuben Fine, David Bronstein, and Miguel Najdorf.

Arpad Elo, the inventor of the scientific rating system employed by FIDE, analysed some 476 major tournament players from the 19th century onward, and of the 51 highest ranked players, approximately one half were Jewish. This includes one of the strongest ever players, Garry Kasparov, who was world No. 1 from 1985 until his retirement in 2005. Kasparov is of Jewish descent, through his father. Bobby Fischer, the highest rated player in history when he became world champion in 1972, had a Jewish mother and likely Jewish father despite antisemitic views. The list also includes Judit Polgár, widely regarded as the strongest female chess player ever.

Beer-sheba in Israel is the city with the most chess grandmasters per capita in the world. Israel has also won one silver and one bronze medal at Chess Olympiads.

== List ==
The list refers to chess players who are Jewish and have attained outstanding achievements in chess.

- Aaron (Albert) Alexandre (c. 1765–1850), German-born French-English
- Simon Alapin (1856–1923), Lithuanian
- Lev Alburt (born 1945), Russian/American
- Izaak Appel (1905–1941), Polish, killed by the Nazis
- Lev Aronin (1920–1982), Russian/Soviet
- Levon Aronian (born 1982), Armenian grandmaster, World Cup champion twice
- Arnold Aurbach (c. 1888–1952), Polish-born French
- Yuri Averbakh (1922–2022), Russian grandmaster who was the only GM to become a centenarian and who played in one Candidates tournament (1953)
- Mary Weiser Bain (1904–1972), born in Hungary (now sub-Carpathian Ukraine), immigrated to the United States as a teenager, first American woman to represent the U.S. in an organized chess competition, won the U.S. Women's Chess Championship in 1951, awarded the Woman International Master title in 1952
- Dina Belenkaya (born 1993) Russian-Israeli chess player, commentator, Twitch streamer, and YouTuber who holds the title of Woman Grandmaster
- Anjelina Belakovskaia (born 1969), Ukrainian-born US woman grandmaster
- Alexander Beliavsky (born 1953), Ukrainian-born Soviet/Slovenian grandmaster
- Joel Benjamin (born 1964), American grandmaster
- Ossip Bernstein (1882–1962), Ukrainian-born French grandmaster
- Arthur Bisguier (1929–2017), US grandmaster
- Abram Blass (1896–1971), Polish
- Isaac Boleslavsky (1919–1977), Ukrainian-born Soviet grandmaster
- Mikhail Botvinnik (1911–1995), Russian/Soviet grandmaster and 6th undisputed world champion
- Gyula Breyer (1893–1921), Hungarian, pioneer of the hypermodern school, important chess theorist, blindfold simultaneous record holder
- David Bronstein (1924–2006), Ukrainian-born Soviet grandmaster,
- Sharon Ellen Burtman (born 1968), US international woman master
- Oscar Chajes (1873–1928), Ukrainian/Polish/Austrian-born US
- Vitaly Chekhover (1908–1965), Russian
- Isabelle Choko (1928–2023), Polish-French concentration camp survivor
- Erich Cohn (1884–1918), German
- Wilhelm Cohn (1859–1913), German
- Moshe Czerniak (1910–1984), Polish-born Israeli
- Arnold Denker (1914–2005), US grandmaster
- Arthur Dunkelblum (1906–1979), Polish-born Belgian
- Mark Dvoretsky (1947–2016), noted Russian trainer and international master
- Roman Dzindzichashvili (born 1944), Georgian-born Israeli American grandmaster
- Vereslav Eingorn (born 1956), Ukrainian grandmaster
- Berthold Englisch (1851–1897), Austrian
- Larry Evans (1932–2010), US grandmaster
- Rafał Feinmesser (1895–?), Polish, killed in Warsaw during Holocaust
- Reuben Fine (1914–1993), US grandmaster
- Alexander Flamberg (1880–1926), Polish
- Salo Flohr (1908–1983), Ukrainian-born Czech and Soviet grandmaster
- Henryk Friedman (1903–1942), Polish, killed by the Nazis
- Paulino Frydman (1905–1982), Polish-born Argentine
- Boris Gelfand (born 1968), Belarusian-born Israeli grandmaster, World Cup champion
- Efim Geller (1925–1998), Ukrainian-born Soviet grandmaster
- Harry Golombek (1911–1995), English
- Eduard Gufeld (1936–2002), Ukrainian grandmaster
- Boris Gulko (born 1947), German-born Russian US grandmaster
- Isidor Gunsberg (1854–1930), Hungarian-born English
- Ilya Gurevich (born 1972), Russian-born US grandmaster and junior World champion
- Mikhail Gurevich (born 1959), Ukrainian-born Russian Turkish grandmaster
- Dmitry Gurevich Born in 1956, Russian/American grandmaster
- Lev Gutman (born 1945), Latvian-born Israeli German grandmaster
- Daniel Harrwitz (1821–1884), Prussian/Polish/German-born English French
- Israel Horowitz (1907–1973), US
- Bernhard Horwitz (1807–1885), German-born English
- Dawid Janowski (1868–1927), Belarusian/Polish-born French grandmaster
- Max Judd (1851–1906), US
- Gregory Kaidanov (born 1959), Ukrainian-born Russian US grandmaster
- Julio Kaplan (born 1950), Argentine-born Puerto Rican US grandmaster and World junior champion
- Mona May Karff (1908–1998), Moldovan-born US woman master
- Isaac Kashdan (1905–1985), US grandmaster
- Alexander Khalifman (born 1966), Russian grandmaster and World champion
- Stanisław Kohn (1895–1940), Polish, killed by the Nazis
- Ignatz von Kolisch (1837–1889), Hungarian/Slovak-born Austrian grandmaster
- George Koltanowski (1903–2000), Belgian-born US grandmaster
- Viktor Korchnoi (1931–2016), Russian-born grandmaster
- Yair Kraidman (born 1932), Israeli grandmaster
- Leon Kremer (1901–1941), Polish
- Irina Krush (born 1983), Ukrainian-born US grandmaster
- Abraham Kupchik (1892–1970), Belarusian/Polish-born US
- Alla Kushnir (1941–2013), Russian Israeli woman grandmaster
- Salo Landau (1903–1944), Polish-born Dutch, killed by the Nazis
- Berthold Lasker (1860–1928), Prussian/German/Polish-born master, elder brother of Emanuel Lasker
- Edward Lasker (1885–1981), Polish/German-born US
- Emanuel Lasker (1868–1941), Prussian/German/Polish-born US grandmaster and second undisputed world champion
- Anatoly Lein (1931–2018), Russian/Soviet/American grandmaster
- Konstantin Lerner (1950–2011), Ukrainian/Israeli grandmaster
- Grigory Levenfish (1889–1961), Polish/Russian-born grandmaster
- Irina Levitina (born 1954), Russian-born US woman grandmaster
- Vladimir Liberzon (1937–1996), Russian-born Israeli grandmaster
- Andor Lilienthal (1911–2010), Russian-born Hungarian/Soviet grandmaster
- Samuel Lipschütz (1863–1905), Austria-Hungary/American
- Johann Löwenthal (1810–1876), Hungarian-born US English
- Moishe Lowtzky (1881–1940), Ukrainian-born Polish, killed by Nazis
- Gyula Makovetz (1860–1903), Hungarian
- Jonathan Mestel (born 1957), English grandmaster and World U-16 champion
- Houshang Mashian (born 1938), Iranian-Israeli chess master
- Jacques Mieses (1865–1954), German-born English grandmaster
- Miguel Najdorf (1910–1997), Polish-born Polish/Argentine grandmaster
- Daniel Naroditsky (1995–2025), American grandmaster and chess streamer
- Ian Nepomniachtchi (born 1990), Russian grandmaster
- Aron Nimzowitsch (1886–1935), Latvian-born Danish
- Isaías Pleci (1907–1979), Argentine
- Judit Polgár (born 1976), Hungarian grandmaster
- Susan Polgár (born 1969), Hungarian-born US grandmaster and World champion
- Zsófia Polgár (born 1974), Hungarian-born Israeli international master
- Lev Polugaevsky (1934–1995), Belarusian/Soviet grandmaster
- Dawid Przepiórka (1880–1940), Polish, killed by Nazis
- Lev Psakhis (born 1958), Russian/Soviet/Israeli grandmaster
- Abram Rabinovich (1878–1943), Lithuanian/Russian
- Ilya Rabinovich (1891–1942), Russian
- Teimour Radjabov (born 1987), Azerbaijani grandmaster
- Nukhim Rashkovsky (1946–2023), Russian grandmaster
- Samuel Reshevsky (1911–1992), Polish-born US grandmaster
- Richard Réti (1889–1929), Slovak/Hungarian-born Czech
- Maxim Rodshtein (born 1989), Israeli U-16 World champion
- Kenneth Rogoff (born 1953), US grandmaster
- Eric Rosen (born 1993), American international master, Twitch streamer, chess YouTuber
- Samuel Rosenthal (1837–1902), Polish-born French
- Eduardas Rozentalis (born 1963), Lithuanian grandmaster
- Levy Rozman (born 1995), American international master, chess YouTuber, commentator, teacher
- Akiba Rubinstein (1880–1961), Polish grandmaster
- Gersz Salwe (1862–1920), Polish grandmaster
- Jennifer Shahade (born 1980), American chess player, poker player, commentator and writer
- Leonid Shamkovich (1923–2005), Soviet/Israeli/Canadian/American grandmaster
- Yury Shulman (born 1975), Belarusian/Soviet/American grandmaster
- Gennady Sosonko (born 1943), Russian-born Dutch grandmaster
- Jon Speelman (born 1956), English grandmaster
- Rudolf Spielmann (1883–1942), Austrian-born Swedish
- Leonid Stein (1934–1973), Ukrainian-born Russian grandmaster
- Endre Steiner (1901–1944), Hungarian, killed by the Nazis
- Lajos Steiner (1903–1975), Romanian/Hungarian-born Australian
- Wilhelm Steinitz (1836–1900), Czech-born Austrian and US grandmaster and 1st undisputed world champion
- Mark Stolberg (1922–1942), Russian
- Emil Sutovsky (born 1977), Israeli grandmaster
- Peter Svidler (born 1976), Russian grandmaster, World Cup champion
- László Szabó (1917–1998), Hungarian grandmaster
- Mark Taimanov (1926–2016), Soviet/Russian grandmaster
- Mikhail Tal (1936–1992), Soviet/Latvian grandmaster and 8th undisputed world champion
- Siegbert Tarrasch (1862–1934), Polish/German grandmaster and Senior World champion
- Savielly Tartakower (1887–1956), Russian-born Austrian/Polish/French grandmaster
- Anna Ushenina (born 1985), Ukraine-born Women's World Champion
- Anatoly Vaisser (born 1949), Kazakh-born Soviet/French grandmaster
- Joshua Waitzkin (born 1976), American Junior Champion and martial arts champion
- Max Weiss (1857–1927), Slovak/Hungarian-born Austrian
- Simon Winawer (1838–1919), Polish
- Patrick Wolff, (born 1968), American grandmaster and twice US champion
- Daniel Abraham "Abe" Yanofsky (1925–2000), Canadian chess player, chess arbiter, writer, lawyer, and politician. The first grandmaster of the British Commonwealth.
- Leonid Yudasin (born 1959), Russian-born Israeli grandmaster
- Tatiana Zatulovskaya (1935–2017), Azerbaijani-born Russian Israeli woman grandmaster
- Johannes Zukertort (1842–1888), Polish-born German English master who lost a match to Steinitz for the world championship

== See also ==
- List of Jewish American sportspeople
- List of Jewish sports commissioners, managers and coaches, officials, owners, promoters, and sportscasters
- List of Jews in sports
- Jewish Sports Review
- International Jewish Sports Hall of Fame
- National Jewish Sports Hall of Fame and Museum
