= Tylkowski =

Tylkowski is a surname. Notable people with the surname include:

- Krzysztof Tylkowski (born 1988), Polish bobsledder
- Roman Tylkowski, Polish chess master
