= 3rd unofficial Chess Olympiad =

International chess competition

The 3rd unofficial Chess Olympiad was held by German Chess Federation (Grossdeutscher Schachbund) as a counterpart of the 1936 Summer Olympics in Berlin with reference to 1924 and 1928 events. Many Jewish chess players took part in the event. Significantly, the "Jewish" teams of Hungary (i.e. Lajos Steiner, Endre Steiner, László Szabó, Ernő Gereben, Kornél Havasi) and Poland (i.e. Paulino Frydman, Miguel Najdorf, Henryk Friedman, Leon Kremer, Henryk Pogorieły) beat "Aryan" Germany. Also Jewish masters from other countries played leading roles there (i.e. Movsas Feigins, Gunnar Friedemann, Imre König, Lodewijk Prins, Isakas Vistaneckis, Emil Zinner, etc.).

The Schach-Olympia 1936 took place in Munich between August 17 and September 1, 1936. In that extra-Olympiad (non-FIDE) 208 participants, representing 21 countries, played 1680 games. The Munich unofficial Olympiad was the biggest team competition ever held.

== Results ==
=== Final ===
#	Country	Points
1	Hungary	110.5
2	Poland	108
3	Germany	106.5
4	Yugoslavia	104.5
5	Czechoslovakia	104
6	Latvia	96.5
7	Austria	95
8	Sweden	94
9	Denmark	91.5
10	Estonia	90
11	Lithuania	77.5
12	Finland	75
13	Netherlands	71.5
14	Romania	68
15	Norway	64.5
16	Brazil	63
17	Switzerland	61.5
18	Italy	59
19	Iceland	57.5
20	France	43.5
21	Bulgaria	38.5

=== Team medals ===
#	Country	Players
1	Hungary	Géza Maróczy, Lajos Steiner, Endre Steiner, Kornél Havasi, László Szabó, Gedeon Barcza, Árpád Vajda, Ernő Gereben, János Balogh, Imre Kóródy Keresztély
2	Poland	Paulin Frydman, Mieczysław Najdorf, Teodor Regedziński, Kazimierz Makarczyk, Henryk Friedman, Leon Kremer, Henryk Pogorieły, Antoni Wojciechowski, Franciszek Sulik, Jerzy Jagielski
3	Germany	Kurt Richter, Carl Ahues, Ludwig Engels, Carl Carls, Ludwig Rellstab, Fritz Sämisch, Ludwig Rödl, Herbert Heinicke, Wilhelm Ernst, Paul Michel

=== Individual medals ===
# Board	Player	Country	Points	Games	%
1	Paul Keres	Estonia	15.5	20	77.5
1	Vasja Pirc	Yugoslavia	12	17	70.6
1	Gideon Ståhlberg	Sweden	11.5	17	67.6
2	Mieczysław Najdorf	Poland	16	20	80.0
2	Lajos Steiner	Hungary	15.5	20	77.5
2	Albert Becker	Austria	13.5	18	75.0
3	Bjørn Nielsen	Denmark	11.5	15	76.7
3	Movsas Feigins	Latvia	14.5	19	76.3
3	Emil Zinner	Czechoslovakia	14.5	20	72.5
4	Karel Hromádka	Czechoslovakia	14	20	70.0
4	Gösta Danielsson	Sweden	13.5	20	67.5
4	Markas Luckis	Lithuania	13.5	20	67.5
5	László Szabó	Hungary	16.5	19	86.8
5	Henryk Friedman	Poland	15.5	20	77.5
5	Ludwig Rellstab	Germany	12	17	70.6
6	Borislav Kostić	Yugoslavia	16	19	84.2
6	Leon Kremer	Poland	15	20	75.0
6	Feliks Villard	Estonia	13	19	68.4
7	Ludwig Rödl	Germany	11	16	68.8
7	Alfred Christensen	Denmark	13	19	68.4
7	Henryk Pogorieły	Poland	13.5	20	67.5
8	Wolfgang Weil	Austria	12.5	17	73.5
8	Herbert Heinicke	Germany	13	18	72.2
8	Karlis Ozols	Latvia	10.5	15	70.0
1 reserve	František Zíta	Czechoslovakia	7.5	11	68.2
1 reserve	Wilhelm Ernst	Germany	9.5	14	67.9
1 reserve	János Balogh	Hungary	8.5	13	65.4
2 reserve	Ozren Nedeljković	Yugoslavia	8	10	80.0
2 reserve	Paul Michel	Germany	9.5	12	79.2
2 reserve	Bertil Sundberg	Sweden	10.5	15	70.0

== See also ==
- 1st unofficial Chess Olympiad (Paris 1924)
- 2nd unofficial Chess Olympiad (Budapest 1926)
- Against Chess Olympiad (Tripoli 1976)
