= Jagielski =

Jagielski (Polish pronunciation: [jaˈɡʲɛlskʲi]; feminine: Jagielska, plural: Jagielscy) may refer to:

- Harry Jagielski (1931–1993), American football player
- Helmut Jagielski (1934–2002), German footballer
- Jake Jagielski, fictional character
- Jerzy Jagielski (1897–1955), Polish chess master and journalist
- Jim Jagielski (born 1961), American software engineer
- Mieczysław Jagielski (1924–1997), Polish politician
- Wojciech Jagielski (born 1960), Polish journalist and author

== See also ==
- Jagielka
