= Antoni Wojciechowski =

Polish chess player

Antoni Wojciechowski (6 June 1905 – 19 January 1938) was a Polish chess master.

He was a well-known player in Poznań in the 1920s and 1930s. In 1926, he tied for 2nd-3rd in the Poznań chess championship. The same year, he won at the Poznań Chess Club Championship. In 1928, he won again the Poznań chess championship. Wojciechowski represented Poznań at the Polish Team championships (1st at Królewska Huta (Königshütte) 1929, and 2nd at Katowice 1934). He took 16th place in the 3rd Polish Chess Championship at Warsaw 1935, which was won by Savielly Tartakower, and 11th place in the 4th Polish Championship at Jurata 1937, which was won again by Tartakower.

He played for Poland on the eighth board (+7 –2 =5) in the 3rd unofficial Chess Olympiad at Munich 1936. The Polish team won the silver medal there. He was a poor man with weak health, and in January 1938 a bad attack of pneumonia killed him.

== Legacy ==
During the interwar period Wojciechowski was one of the strongest Polish chess masters and won games against players like Dawid Przepiórka, Rudolf Spielmann and Miguel Najdorf. Wojciechowski is however probably best known for his famous combination in the game Tylkowski – Wojciechowski, Poznań 1931 against Roman Tylkowski at Poznań 1931.
