= Paul de Schlözer =

Russian composer

Paul de Schlözer or Paweł Schlözer (1841 or 1842 – 1 July 1898) was a Polish pianist and teacher of German descent. He was possibly also a composer, but the only two works attributed to him may have been written by Polish composer Moritz Moszkowski.

== Life ==
Very little is known about his life. He became the piano accompanist to Pablo de Sarasate and to his own brother, the violinist Teodor (Fyodor) de Schlözer. In 1879 he taught at the Institute of Music in Warsaw, where he succeeded Juliusz Janotha. Ignacy Jan Paderewski mentions him in his letters, sometimes by disparaging references such as "Mr. Paul" and "Pablito". Around 1892 he became a professor at the Moscow Conservatory, where his most important pupil was the music historian Leonid Sabaneyev. On 3 February 1894, he performed the Chopin Cello Sonata with the visiting Czech cellist Hanuš Wihan, at the Conservatory.

His niece Tatiana Fyodorovna Schlözer became Alexander Scriabin’s second wife. His nephew, Tatiana's brother, was the music critic Boris de Schlözer.

== Controversy ==
He is unknown as a composer except for two études, Op. 1, for piano. The assertion made in reference materials – that Sergei Rachmaninoff used Étude No. 2 in A-flat as his daily warm-up exercise – may also not be entirely accurate (one source refers to this story as a legend). There are several easily available recordings of the étude, such as by Jorge Bolet and Stephen Hough. There is also a famous 1933 recording by Eileen Joyce. The first recording, from 1907, was by the Liszt pupil Vera Timanova.

Some historians believe that de Schlözer was not the composer of these études at all, and, given their virtuosity, it is very intriguing why nothing else from his pen ever appeared, or why he did not achieve any sort of recognition as a major pianist himself. The story goes that they were in fact written by Moszkowski, who lost the manuscript to de Schlözer in a card game, who published them as his own works. The de Schlözer Étude No. 2 is longer, more elaborate, and more technically demanding than the 11th of Moszkowski's 15 Études de Virtuosité, Op. 72, but both are in A-flat and in a similar bravura style. However, it may be that these similarities gave rise to the legend that de Schlözer pieces were written by Moszkowski.
