= Jagielka =

Jagielka (Polish: Jagiełka) is a Polish surname. Notable people with the surname include:

- Phil Jagielka (born 1982), English footballer
- Steve Jagielka (1978–2021), English footballer

== See also ==
- Jagielski
