= Ozren Nedeljković =

Serbian chess player (1903–1984)

Ozren Nedeljković (28 February 1903, Sremski Karlovci – 11 June 1984, Belgrade) was a Serbian chess master.

He shared 1st at Belgrade 1927, tied for 4-5th at Karlovac 1927, won the 1st Levin tournament in 1932, shared 2nd in 1933 (the 2nd Levin tourn.), tied for 4-6th in 1934 (the 3rd Levin tourn.), shared 2nd in Belgrade City Chess Championship in 1934, and took 12th at Ljubljana 1938 (Yugoslav Chess Championship, Boris Kostić won).

Ozren Nedeljković played for Yugoslavia in 3rd unofficial Chess Olympiad at Munich 1936 where he won individual gold medal on second reserve board. He also represented Yugoslavia in several friendly matches against Switzerland (1947, 1950), Austria (1949), Netherlands (1949, 1950), Sweden (1950), United Kingdom (1951), West Germany (1951, 1952, 1954), Italy (1951, 1953, 1954), and Hungary (1957, 1960).
