= Marian Wróbel =

Polish chess problemist (1907–1960)

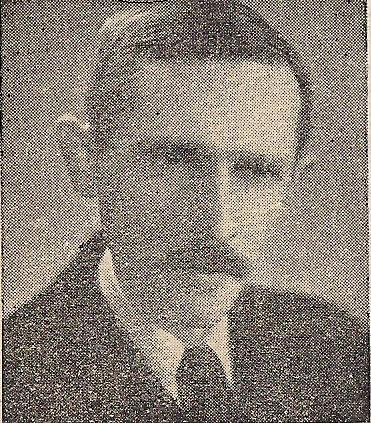
- Wróbel in the 1930s

Personal information
- Born: Marian Wróbel; 1 January 1907 Lwów
- Died: 25 April 1960 (aged 53) Warsaw, Poland

Chess career
- Country: Poland
- Title: International Judge of Chess Composition (1959)

Marian Wróbel (1 January 1907 – 25 April 1960) was a prominent Polish chess problemist of the mid-twentieth century. Between 1947 and 1950 he was considered the leading chess composer in the world. During his lifetime he published more than 1,000 problems and was a FIDE International Master of Chess Composition.

== Biography ==
Born in Lwów (now Lviv) on 1 January 1907, Wróbel learned to play chess as a child of 5 and became interested in chess problems. In 1922, he published his first problem at the age of 15 and in 1928 the International Association of Problemists ranked him fourth in the world.

Marian Wróbel
1st Prize, Magasinet, 1931

Position: d7 white rook, f7 black knight, d6 black knight, f6 black pawn, b5 black pawn, c5 white rook, f5 white pawn, g5 black pawn, h5 white king, b4 white pawn, d4 black king, e4 black pawn, f4 black pawn, g4 white queen, g3 black pawn, d2 white pawn, e2 black pawn, g2 white bishop, a1 black bishop, c1 white bishop, d1 black bishop, e1 white knight, g1 white knight

Mate in two moves
Marian Wróbel
1st Prize, Berner Tagwacht, 1948

Position: a8 white rook, a7 black bishop, a6 white bishop, a4 black king, b4 white pawn, d3 white knight, e3 black pawn, a2 white king, e2 white pawn

Mate in three moves

He studied in Lwów and Warsaw and completed a Magister's degree in Polish philology in 1932. He became a teacher but due to health problems transferred to administrative work.

During the 1930s Wróbel was a close collaborator and friend of Dawid Przepiórka and hosted him following the German invasion of Poland in 1939 when Przepiórka's Warsaw home was destroyed. Wróbel was with Przepiórka during a private gathering of chess players in January 1940 when the Gestapo raided the meeting and arrested all the participants.

Wróbel was very active as a journalist of chess and published three major books on chess composition.

In 1954 he was awarded the FIDE title International Master of Chess Composition, and in 1959 he became an International Judge of Chess Composition, the first year the title was awarded.

Wróbel died in Warsaw on 25 April 1960.

The diagram on the left is one of the best twomovers of Wróbel. In the initial position White has answers to all Black's moves: 1... e3 2. dxe3#; 1... f3 2. Nxf3# (exploiting the half-pin of Pe4 and Pf4); 1. Bd-any 2. Nxe2#; 1... Bb2 2. Bxb2#; 1... Bc3 2. dxc3#; 1... Nf-any 2. Rxd6#. However, White has no waiting move, and the set play cannot be realized. The key 1. Qxe2! destroys the half-pin and pins the Queen. Black is in Zugzwang: 1... e3 2. Rd5#; 1... f3 2. Qe3#; 1... g4 (Ba4,Bb3) 2. Qxe4#; 1... Bc2 2. Nxc2#; 1... Bxe2+ 2. Nxe2#. The remaining variations remain unchanged.

The diagram on the right is one of Wróbel's best known threemovers. In the initial position White has a ready response to the only possible move of Black: 1... B-any 2. Bc4+ Ba7 3. Rxa7#. However, White has no waiting move. The solution is the unexpected 1. Re8!! Zugzwang. The main variations explain the choice of the square e8 for the Rook: 1... Bb6 2. Rb8 Be4 3. Bb5#; 1... Bc5 2. Re5 Bb6 3. Bb5# (2... Bxb4 3. Sb2#); 1... Bd4 (Bb8) 2. Re4 Ba7 3. Sb2#. Other choices of the square for the Rook fail: 1. Rc8? Bc5!; 1. Rd8? Bd4!; 1. Rf8? Bb8!. In each case, capturing the Bishop leads to a stalemate.
