= Vera Timanova =

Russian pianist (1855–1942)

Vera Viktorovna Timanova Вера Викторовна Тиманова
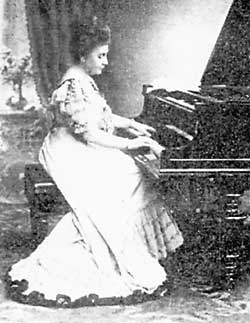

Background information
- Born: February 18, 1855; Ufa, Russia
- Died: February 22, 1942 (aged 87) Leningrad, Soviet Union
- Occupation: Pianist

Vera Viktorovna Timanova (Note: Russian: Вера Викторовна Тиманова, romanized: Vera Viktorovna Timanova/) (18 February 1855 – 22 February 1942) was a Russian pianist.

== Life ==
Vera Timanova was born into a well-to-do family in Ufa, where she spent her childhood. She showed musical aptitude at an early age, and at age six began taking piano instruction from local teachers, with her first public performance at age nine. About this concert she wrote in her autobiography: "The announcement of the concert made a splash in the city. Tickets sold briskly and I earned my first thousand roubles. I performed Mozart's Concerto and several pieces. The success was complete".

The child prodigy came to the attention of composer Anton Rubinstein, who spoke highly of her potential. The two went on to become close friends. Rubinstein's recommendation led to Timanova being sponsored by a local merchant to attend Carl Tausig's School of Advanced Piano Playing in Berlin. Subsequently, Timanova studied with Franz Liszt in Budapest and became a prominent performer in Russia, France, Austria, Britain, Germany and Turkey, while periodically returning to Ufa to perform; the last such trip was in 1896.

Among Timanova's other prominent admirers were Alexander Borodin and Pyotr Ilyich Tchaikovsky, who dedicated the Scherzo humoristique, part of his Six Pieces for Piano Solo, Op. 19 (1873) to her. In addition to her friendship with Rubinstein, Timanova was also very close to Czech conductor and composer Eduard Nápravník. His Fantaisie (1881), written for Timanova, is a virtuosic 12-minute work based on three Russian folk songs including The Song of the Volga Boatmen.

Timanova returned to Russia permanently in 1907, settling in St. Petersburg, giving concerts and teaching piano students. In 1907 she recorded a number of pieces on piano rolls for Welte-Mignon, including pieces by Liszt, Sergei Lyapunov, Moritz Moszkowski, and the extraordinarily difficult Étude in A flat, Op. 1, No. 2 attributed to Paul de Schlözer. There is a surviving recording of Timanova playing Liszt's Hungarian Rhapsody No. 1

After the 1917 Revolution, Timanova's wealthy background led to her being critical of the new Bolshevik authorities, but she was nonetheless granted a VIP pension of 50 roubles, sufficient to finance the employment of a maid. Her last public performance was in 1937 when she was 82 years of age. Vera Timanova died of starvation during the siege of Leningrad in February 1942.

== Sources ==
- "Тиманова, Вера Викторовна" . Brockhaus and Efron Encyclopedic Dictionary (in Russian). 1906.
