= Jan Kleczyński Sr. =

Polish musician and chess player

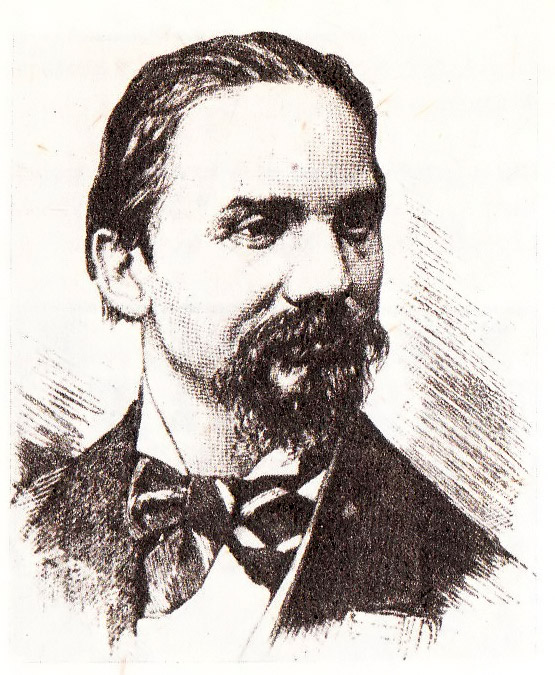

Jan Kleczyński (8 June 1837 – 15 September 1895) was a Polish pianist, composer, journalist, and chess master.

Born into a Polish noble family in Janiewicze, Volhynia (then Russian Empire), he graduated from a conservatory of music in Paris (1855–1862) and then played several pianist concerts in France. In 1866, he returned to Poland to live in Warsaw.

He lectured and published on the interpretation of the works of Frédéric Chopin. His work in this field was (he claimed) endorsed by pupils and friends of Chopin's, including Marcelina Czartoryska, Camilla O'Meara and Georges Mathias, and by Natalia Janotha, Princess Czartoryska's pupil, who translated some of his lectures for English publication.

He came 2nd, behind Szymon Winawer, in the first Warsaw City Chess Championship in 1868, and came 3rd, after Józef Żabiński and Artur Popławski, in the second Warsaw Championship in 1884.

Jan Kleczyński Sr. wrote a weekly chess column for Tygodnik Ilustrowany (1859–1884), and Kurier Warszawski (1877–1895). His son Jan Kleczyński Jr. continued his work in 1897–1939.

== Publications about Chopin ==
- J. Kleczyński, Frédéric Chopin: De L'Interprétation de ses Oeuvres – Trois Conférences faites a Varsovie (The Interpretation of the Works of Frederic Chopin - Three Conferences held at Warsaw) (Félix Mackar, Paris 1880).
- J. Kleczyński, Chopin's Greater Works (Preludes, Ballads, Nocturnes, Polonaises, Mazurkas): How they should be understood (including Chopin's Notes for a 'Method of Methods') translated by Natalie Janotha (William Reeves, London: Charles Scribner's Sons, New York, no date (1st Edn c. 1895, 2nd c. 1900)). (Kleczynski's last Lectures, delivered at Warsaw in 1883.)

== Selected Compositions ==
- Carillon (Chime of Bells) for organ
- Variations on theme "O, mein lieber Augustin" for 2 violins
- 22 Variations for Violin & Viola, op. 3
- 6 String Trios, op. 4
