= Feliks Villard =

Estonian chess player

Personal information
- Born: 1908
- Died: unknown

Chess career
- Country: Estonia; Soviet Union

Feliks Villard (4 November 1908 – date of death unknown) was an Estonian chess player.

== Biography ==
In Estonian Chess Championship Feliks Villard has won silver (1952) and 2 bronze (1950, 1951) medals. In Estonian Team Chess Championship he has won 2 gold (1931 - with Tallinn Kalev team, 1949 - with Tallinn city team) and 2 silver (1936 - with Pärnu Maleselts team, 1938 - with Pärnu Kalev team) medals. Feliks Villard played for Estonia at sixth board in 3rd unofficial Chess Olympiad in Munich (+11 –4 =4) and won individual bronze medal. Also he two times played for Estonia in Soviet Team Chess Championships (1953, 1958). His last known tournament was Ilmar Raud memorial in Viljandi (1971) where he divided fourth place.
