= Emil Zinner =

Emil Zinner (23 August 1909 in Brno – 8 July 1942 in Majdanek) was a Jewish-Czech chess master.

== Biography ==
He won a tournament at Králicky 1929; tied for 5–6th at Bilina 1930 (Heinz Foerder won); tied for 8–10th at Brno 1931 (Salo Flohr won), tied for 2nd-4th at Moravska Ostrava 1933 (Ernst Grünfeld won); tied for 4–6th at Bad Liebenwerda 1934 (Flohr won); tied for 5–7th at Luhačovice 1935 (Karel Opočenský won); tied for 2nd-3rd, behind Karl Gilg at Konstantinsbad 1935; took 15th at Poděbrady 1936 (Flohr won), and took 2nd, behind Paul Keres, at Prague 1937.

Zinner played for Czechoslovakia in 3rd unofficial Chess Olympiad at Munich 1936, and won an individual bronze medal at third board (+14 –5 =1) there. He also played in 7th Chess Olympiad at Stockholm 1937 at third board (+9 –4 =4).

He was murdered in the Nazi Majdanek concentration camp in 1942.
