= Natalia Janotha =

Polish pianist and composer

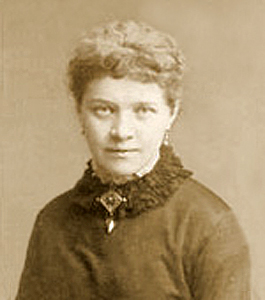
Natalia Janotha

Natalia Janotha (8 June 1856 – 9 June 1932) was a Polish pianist and composer.

== Biography ==
Natalia Janotha was born in Warsaw, Poland, the daughter of Juliusz Janotha, who was a composer and teacher at the Music Institute in Warsaw. She started piano lessons with her father at a young age and later studied music in Berlin with Ernst Rudorff, Woldemar Bargiel, and Clara Schumann. She also may have had lessons from Johannes Brahms. She performed her first recital in 1868 and toured Europe as a concert pianist.

She was known as an interpreter of the music of Chopin, whose sister was a very close friend of her mother's; and she received advice from Chopin's pupil Princess Czartoryska née Radziwill. In 1885 she became the Imperial Court pianist in Berlin. She also won notoriety as a mountain climber, sometimes wearing men's trousers. In 1883 she became the first woman to ascend Gerlach, the highest mountain in the Carpathians.

She lived in London for a few years, but was deported in 1915 owing to the political circumstances of World War I, because she was the German court pianist. Then, she emigrated to The Hague, where she served as accompanist to the dancer Angèle Sydow.

She died in The Hague on 9 June 1932. A few days later, a funeral for her was held at the Jacob Church in Parkstraat. She was buried at the Kerkkhoflan Cemetery, a newspaper in The Hague reported.

Mary Drew said, "I am extremely glad to hear that Miss Janotha is giving her aid to the interpretation of Chopin, whom she so deeply venerates, for I feel sure that no one living is more competent to do it."

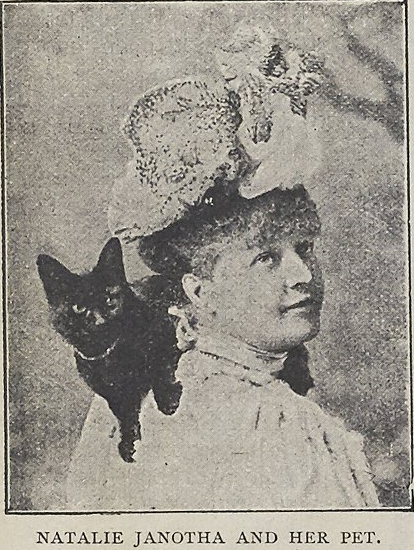
Natalia Janotha and "Prince White Heather" (The Girl's Own Paper, Volume 23. Issue 1137.1901-10-12, p.20)

She was known for having a black cat, named "Prince White Heather", which means good luck.

Harold C. Schonberg said, she was known for performing only as long as her dog was on stage within her view and a prayer book was placed on the piano. He also said, after listening her playing("Gavotte impériale", recorded in 1904), "a screamingly funny piece of music, and she bangs it out with great enthusiasm."

== Works ==
Janotha composed about 400 works, mostly for piano. Selected works include:

- Mountain Scenes, dedicated to Schumann
- Gavotte impériale(1890)
- Deutscher Kaiser Marsch : op. 9(1895)
- Tatras
- The Impression from Zakopane
- Morskie Oko
- Sabala
- Gerlach
- Kościelisko
- Bandit
- Polonaise funèbre : pour piano : op. 100(1928)
- Cadenzas for Beethoven's Pianoforte Concerto in G : Op. 58
- Tuning Up (text: Charles Peters) (1895)

Natalie Janotha also translated and edited books on subjects relating to Chopin, including:

- Chopin's Greater Works (Preludes, Ballads, Nocturnes, Polonaises, Mazurkas): How they should be understood (including Chopin's Notes for a 'Method of Methods' (Note: Chopin's Notes for a 'Method of Methods' she quoted in the books was bequested by Marcelina Czartoryska. It was obtained by Alfred Cortot after Janotha died, in 1936.)) by Jan Kleczyński (William Reeves, London: Charles Scribner's Sons, New York, no date (1st Edn c. 1895, 2nd c. 1900)). (Kleczynski's last Lectures, delivered at Warsaw in 1883.)
- Chopin as revealed by extracts from his diary by Stanisław Tarnowski (William Reeves, London, no date (c.1905)).
