= Imre Korody =

Hungarian chess player

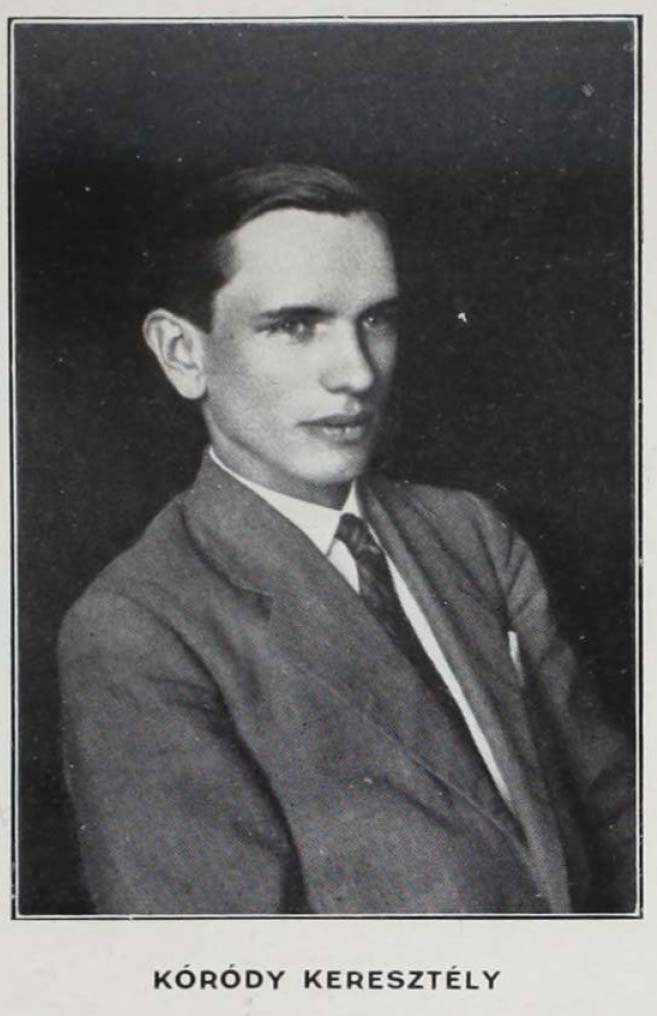
Image of Kóródy Keresztély

Imre Kóródy Keresztély (12 September 1905 – 27 January 1969) was a Hungarian chess master.

He took 6th at Budapest 1932 (Géza Maróczy won), took 8th at Budapest 1934 (Maróczy Jubileé, Erich Eliskases won), and tied for 9-10th at Tatatovaros 1935 (László Szabó won).

He represented Hungary and won a team gold medal in the 3rd unofficial Chess Olympiad held at Munich in 1936.
