= Juliusz Janotha =

Polish pianist and composer

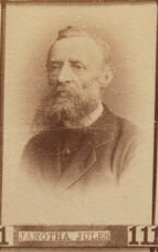
Juliusz Janotha

Juliusz Janotha (b. 1819 – d. 26 June 1883 in Warsaw), was a Polish pianist, composer and teacher of German origin. He was married to Anthony Oleschinsky's daughter Anne Oleschinska, with whom he had a daughter, the pianist and composer Natalia Janotha.

Supported by Apollinary Katski, he collected funds for the construction of the Music Institute in Warsaw. After the inauguration in 1861, he took over his piano teaching. He retired in 1879, being so succeeded by Paul de Schlözer. (Note: Paul de Schlözer, together with his brother Roman Schlözer and the Polish teacher of composition Rudolf Strobl, was one of the teachers of Ignacy Jan Paderewski at the Music Institute in Warsaw when he studied there between the years of 1872 and 1878.) His students include Ignacy Jan Paderewski and Józef Śliwiński. In his last years of life, as reported in the obituary newspaper Echo Muzyczne i Teatralne, at the urging of her daughter, he took over composition and published a number of piano pieces.

He died on 26 June 1883, buried in the Powązki Cemetery.

== Works ==
- Deux Mazurkas (No. 1 in B♭ minor, No. 2 in D♭ major) Op. 1, dedicated to Tytus Chałubiński
- Valse élégante Op. 2
- Gavotte (E major)
- Pieśń bez słów (Songs Without Words) (E♭ major)
