= Alfred Christensen (chess player) =

Danish chess player (1905–1974)

Personal information
- Full name: Alfred August Christensen
- Born: August 16, 1905
- Died: 1974 (aged 68–69)

Chess career
- Country: Denmark

Alfred August Christensen (August 16, 1905 – 1974) was a Danish chess player.

== Biography ==
He participated in Danish Chess Championship in 1935, 1936, 1939, and 1942.

Alfred Christensen played for Denmark in Chess Olympiads:

- In 1936, at seventh board in 3rd unofficial Chess Olympiad in Munich (+11 –4 =4) and won individual silver medal;
- In 1939, at third board in 8th Chess Olympiad in Buenos Aires (+5 –9 =5).

Christensen was a chess writer. In 1943 he published the book "I Caissas Tjeneste" where he annotated his games played between 1934 and 1942. He also co-authored with Bjørn Nielsen the chess textbook "Alt om Skak" (Odense, 1943).
