= Józef Żabiński =

Polish chess player and problemist

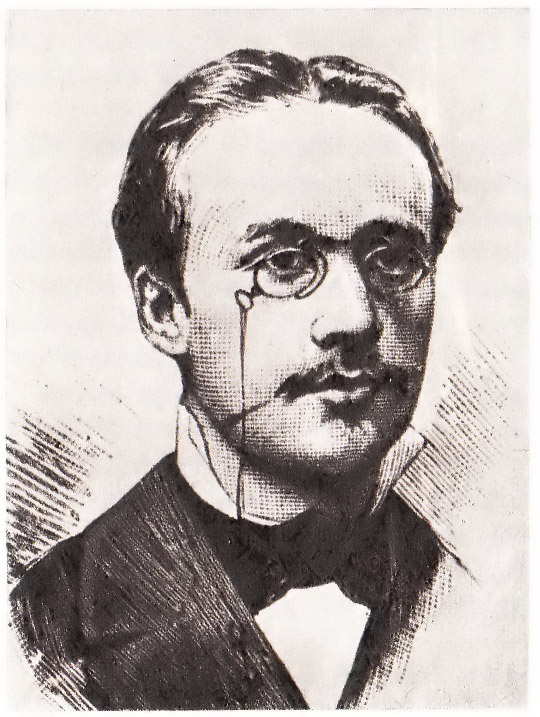

Józef Żabiński (1860 – 27 December 1928) was a Polish chess master and problemist.

Born in Warsaw (then in the Russian Empire), he was educated in a high school gymnasium and graduated in law faculty at the Imperial University of Warsaw (Императорский Варшавский Университет) in 1886.

Żabiński won the 2nd Warsaw City Chess Championship in 1883/84. He drew a mini-match with Simon Alapin (1 : 1) at Warsaw 1888.

In 1899, he became the first chairman of the Warsaw Association of the Followers of the Chess Game (Warszawskie Towarzystwo Zwolenników Gry Szachowej). After World War I, he was an organizer of chess tournaments in Poland. He was the first chairman of the Polish Chess Federation in 1926–1928.

He was the father of Jan Żabiński, a zoologist and zootechnician by profession, a scientist, and organizer and director of the renowned Warsaw Zoo before and during World War II.
