= Theodor Germann =

Latvian chess player (1879–1935)

Theodor Germann (Latvian: Teodors Germans; 14 August 1879 – 29 January 1935) was a Latvian chess master.

He tied for 6-8th at Riga 1899 (the 1st Baltic Chess Congress), took 5th at Riga 1900, took 6th at Dorpat (Tartu) 1901 (the 2nd Baltic-ch), tied for 6-7th at Riga 1902, tied for 3-4th at Reval (Tallinn) 1904, tied for 6-7th at Riga 1907, and tied for 8-9th at Reval 1909.

In 1910s, he lived in England, where he played in several tournaments in London. He tied for 9-10th in 1913 and 1914, shared 1st with Edward Guthlac Sergeant and lost a playoff match to him in 1915/16, took 7th in 1916, took 5th in 1917, and shared 1st with R.C.J. Walker in 1918. After World War I, he tied for 9-10th at Hastings 1919 (Minor, E.G. Sergeant won), tied for 9-10th at Riga 1924 (the 1st Latvian Chess Championship, Hermanis Matisons won), and tied for 3rd-5th at Tallinn 1930 (the 3rd Estonian Chess Championship, Vladas Mikėnas won).
