= Edward Guthlac Sergeant =

English chess master

Edward Guthlac Sergeant (3 December 1881, Crowland, Lincolnshire – 16 November 1961, Kingston upon Thames) was an English chess master.

Sergeant participated many times in the British Chess Championship, the London City championship and the Hastings International Chess Congress. In 1907, he was one of four players who tied for 2nd place in the British Championship in London; the winner was Henry Ernest Atkins. He won or shared 1st place at London in 1913, at London in 1915/16 (when he won a playoff match against Theodor Germann), at London in 1916, at Hastings in 1919 (Minor), at Bromley in 1920 and at Broadstairs in 1921. He tied for 2nd place with Harry Golombek at the British Championship at Brighton in 1938; the victor was Conel Hugh O'Donel Alexander.

Sergeant was a second cousin of Philip Walsingham Sergeant. In 1949 he was awarded the OBE in the Birthday Honours in recognition of his 39 years' service in the office of the Solicitor to the Board of the Inland Revenue. He was the author of a notable work on Stamp Duty.
