= Bertil Sundberg =

Swedish chess player

Personal information
- Born: July 7, 1907 Stockholm, Sweden
- Died: July 20, 1979 (aged 72) Stockholm, Sweden

Chess career
- Country: Sweden

Bertil Sundberg (July 7, 1907, Stockholm – July 20, 1979, Stockholm) was a Swedish chess player.

== Biography ==
In 1938 Bertil Sundberg won the first Swedish Correspondence Chess Championship. He repeated this success two more times (1943, 1947).

He represented Sweden and won an individual bronze medal at second reserve board (+10 −4 =1) in the 3rd unofficial Chess Olympiad held at Munich in 1936.
