= Jerzy Jagielski =

Polish chess player and journalist

Jerzy Jagielski (16 September 1897, Warsaw – 5 January 1955, Munich) was a Polish chess master and journalist.

He played several times in Warsaw City championships, where tied for 12-13th in 1926, 10-11th in 1930, 5-6th in 1931, 7-8th in 1932, and took 12th in 1934. He won twice in local tournaments at Warsaw 1929 (ahead of Mieczysław Najdorf and Moshe Czerniak) and 1933, and took 4th place in 1938/1939.

Jagielski played for Poland in 3rd unofficial Chess Olympiad at Munich 1936 and won team silver medal. He was also the correspondent of Polish Telegraphic Agency there.

In 1937, he took 21st in Jurata (the 4th Polish Chess Championship). During World War II he lived in Warsaw, occupied by Nazis, where he played in underground chess tournaments (he shared 2nd place in 1944). After the collapse of Warsaw Uprising in October 1944, he was taken away to Germany. He settled in Bavaria after the war because of the communist regime in Poland.
