= Abram Blass =

Polish-Israeli chess player

Moshe Aba Blass
- משה אבה בלאס
- Born: 1896; Łomża, Poland
- Died: 1971 (aged 74–75); Tel Aviv, Israel
- Occupation: Chess master
- Known for: Winning team bronze medal at the 1928 Chess Olympiad

Moshe Aba Blass (Hebrew: משה אבה בלאס; born 1896, Łomża, Poland - 1971, Tel-Aviv, Israel) was a Polish-Israeli chess master.

Born in Łomża (then Russian Empire), he moved to the US, staying from 1911 to 1924. After returning to Poland, he lived in Warsaw. In 1924/25, Blass tied for 3rd-5th in Warsaw (Stanisław Kohn won). In 1926, he tied for 1st with Paulin Frydman in Warsaw. In 1926, he tied for 8-9th with Mieczysław Chwojnik at the 1st Polish Chess Championship in Warsaw. The event was won by Dawid Przepiórka. In 1926/27, he took 5th in Warsaw (Kohn and Leon Kremer won). In 1927, he took 8th at the 2nd POL-ch in Łódź. The event was won by Akiba Rubinstein. In 1928, he won, ahead of Frydman and Kazimierz Makarczyk, in Warsaw.

Blass played for Poland on the reserve board (+4 –3 =5) in the 2nd Chess Olympiad at The Hague 1928. He won team bronze medal there. He, along with other members of the Warsaw team (Rafał Feinmesser, Frydman, Stanisław Kohn, Leon Kremer, Karol Piltz and Henryk Pogorieły), won the gold medal in the 1st Polish Team Championship at Królewska Huta (Königshütte) 1929; took 2nd, behind Kremer, at Warsaw 1929 and took 8th at Warsaw 1930 (P. Frydman won).

In 1931, he immigrated to Mandatory Palestine where he won the chess competition at the 2nd Maccabiah Games and the Palestine Championship). The next year, he took 2nd in the Tel Aviv City-ch and tied for 2nd-3rd, behind Moshe Czerniak, in Tel Aviv (Palestine-ch). He is buried in Bat Yam Cemetery.

== See also ==
- Israeli Chess Championship
- Sport in Israel
- List of Jewish chess players
