= Isabelle Choko =

Polish-French chess player and Holocaust survivor (1928–2023)

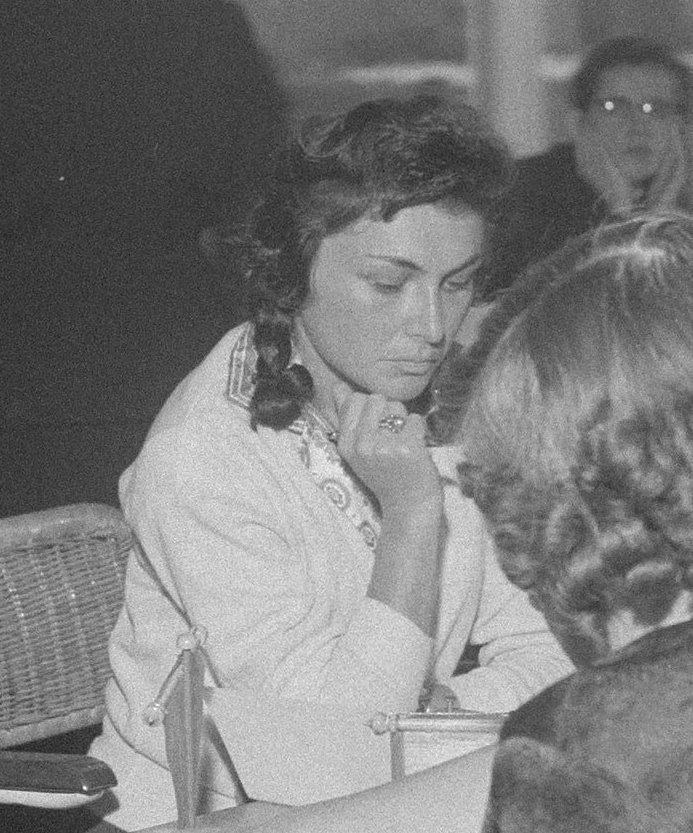
- Choko in 1957 in 1st Women's Chess Olympiad

Personal information
- Born: Izabela Sztrauch Galewska; 18 September 1928 Łódź, Poland
- Died: 21 July 2023 (aged 94)

Chess career
- Country: France

Isabelle Choko (née Izabela Sztrauch Galewska, 18 September 1928 – 21 July 2023) was a Polish-French Holocaust survivor and chess player who won the 1956 French Women's Chess Championship.

== Biography ==
Isabelle Choko was born in Łódź, Poland on 18 September 1928. She and her parents were driven out of their pharmacy and sent to the Łódź Ghetto established in 1940. Her father died in February 1942 of deprivation and hunger. During the summer of 1944, the ghetto was liquidated and Isabelle Choko and her mother were sent to Auschwitz concentration camp where she was selected in a working kommando. In February 1945, during the evacuation of Auschwitz, she was sent to Bergen-Belsen concentration camp where her mother died. Weakened by typhus, she was saved by a British army doctor when the camp was liberated. At that time, she weighed only 25 kg. She was sent to Sweden to regain her health before joining one of her uncles in Paris in 1946.

In Paris, she met Arthur Choko whom she married and with whom she had three children. She became French women's chess champion in 1956. At the beginning of the 2000s, she decided to testify about the deportation by publishing her autobiography Mes deux vies with the editions Caractères. She will be one of the 52,000 surviving witnesses of the Shoah filmed by the Shoah Foundation as well as for the documentary Les Survivants by Patrick Rotman.

Choko played for France in the Women's Chess Olympiad:

- In 1957, at second board in the 1st Chess Olympiad (women) in Emmen (+4, =3, -4).

Isabelle Choko died on 21 July 2023, at the age of 94.

== Awards ==
- French female chess champion in 1956
- Knight (2007) then officer of the Legion of Honour (2016)

== Publications ==
- Isabelle Choko, La Jeune Fille aux yeux bleus, éditions Le Manuscrit / Fondation pour la Mémoire de la Shoah, coll. « Témoignages de la Shoah », 2014, 402 p. (ISBN 978-2304044768)
- Isabelle Choko, Frances Irwin, Lotti Kahana-Aufleger, Margit Raab Kalina, Jane Lipski et the Holocaust Survivors’, Stolen Youth: Five Women's Survival In The Holocaust, Memoirs Project, 30 juin 2005, 336 p. (ISBN 978-0976073925)
- Isabelle Choko, Mes deux vies, Édition Caractères, 2 février 2005, 224 p. (ISBN 978-2854463743)
