= Roman Tylkowski =

Polish chess player

- Roman Tylkowski at the sixth chess tournament for the Poznań championship

Roman Tylkowski was a Polish chess master.

He was a well-known player in Poznań, Poland, in the 1930s and 1940s. He represented the city in 1934 and 1948 in the Polish Chess Team Championships.

== Legacy ==
Tylkowski is probably best known for participation in the game Tylkowski – Wojciechowski, Poznań 1931 against Antoni Wojciechowski at Poznań 1931 in which Wojciechowski played his famous combination. While the game is documented on many websites and is included in a well-known chess book (see references), there is some dispute regarding the moves in this game and whether it even occurred.
