= Ernő Gereben =

Hungarian-Swiss chess player

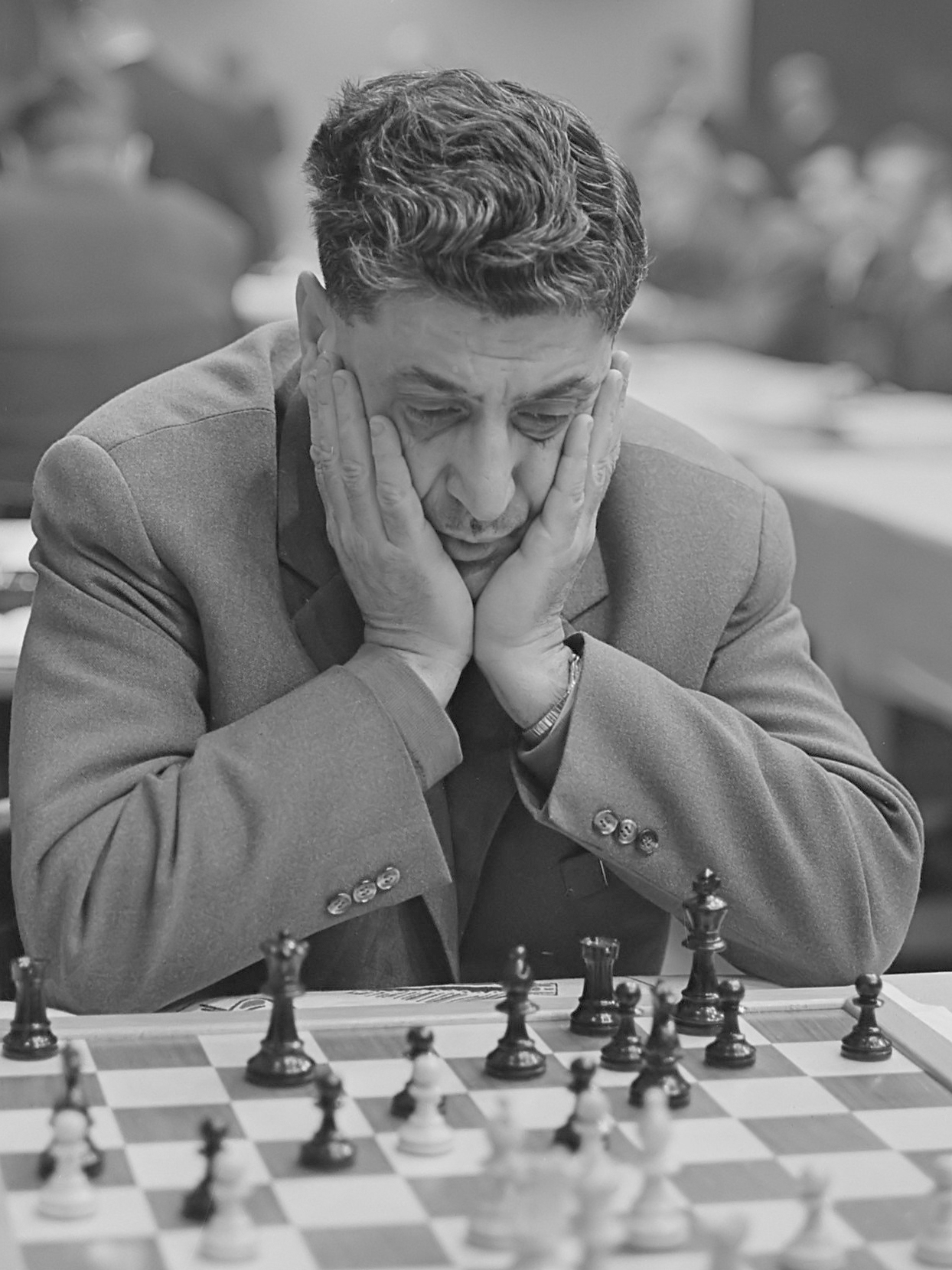
Ernő Gereben (1963)

Ernő Gereben (18 June 1907 – 16 May 1988) was a Hungarian–Swiss chess master whose half-century career extended from the mid-1920s to the late 1970s.

Born in Sopron, a Hungarian town at the Austrian border, Ernő Gereben used, until 1935, the German-language form of his name, Ernest (or Ernst) Grünfeld. In 1926, he tied for 1st–2nd in Körmend. In 1928, he won in Šumperk. In 1930, he took 5th in Budapest and tied for 7–8th in Győr. In 1932, he took 7th in Budapest. In 1934, he tied for 5–7th in Sopron (Rudolf Spielmann won). In 1934, he tied for 13–14th in Budapest (Maróczy Jubilee), which was won by Erich Eliskases. In 1935 he tied for 2nd–3rd with Albert Becker, behind László Szabó, in Tata-Tóváros. In 1936, he took 4th, behind Mieczysław Najdorf, Lajos Steiner and Endre Steiner in Budapest.

Following World War II, Gereben played in several Hungarian Chess Championships. In 1947, he won team gold medal and individual silver medal at sixth board in the 2nd Balkan Games in Sofia. In 1947, he took 7th in Vienna (2nd Schlechter Memorial; Szabó won). In 1948, he took 5th in Bad Gastein (Erik Lundin won). In 1951, he won in Sopot. In 1952, he took 15th in Budapest (Paul Keres won).

Due to the Hungarian uprising in 1956, Gereben emigrated to Switzerland and began playing extensively in the west. In 1957, he took 2nd, behind Gedeon Barcza, in San Benedetto del Tronto. In 1958/59, he took 3rd in Hastings. In 1959, he tied for 1st in Bognor Regis. In 1960, he tied for 4-5th in Zurich. In 1963/64, he tied for 1st-4th in Reggio Emilia. In 1967, he tied for 2nd-5th in Amsterdam (Master Tournament). In 1969, he took 4th in Monte Carlo (Master Tournament).

Gereben played four times in the Chess Olympiads; once for Hungary at first reserve board (+6 −3 =6) in the 11th Olympiad at Amsterdam 1954, and thrice for Switzerland; at third board (+5 −4 =7) at Siegen 1970, at second reserve (+3 −5 =5) at Skopje 1972, and at first reserve board (+3 –3 =7) at Nice 1974.

He remained a keen player in his adopted country even into his seventies. The British Chess Magazine editor, Bernard Cafferty, described him as "a delightfully friendly personality, rather different to many of the continental masters of that time. Chess was fun for him, not just a way to make a living."

Gereben was awarded the International Master (IM) title in 1950. He died in Switzerland in the year of his 81st birthday.
