= Polish Chess Federation =

Governing body of chess in Poland

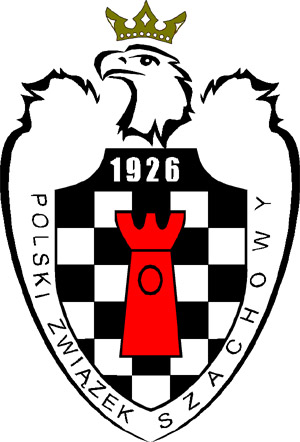
Polski Związek Szachowy emblem

The Polish Chess Federation (Polski Związek Szachowy, PZSzach) was created on 11 April 1926 in Warsaw.

Józef Żabiński was the first chairman. The initial statute outlined the fundamental objectives of the association including amongst others the popularisation of the game of chess and general organization of the chess movement in Poland, representation outside the country, coordination of the activities of clubs and regional associations as well as organization of individual and team tournaments and championships (in different age categories).

The Polish Chess Federation was invited to join the International Chess Federation (FIDE) in 1927. After 2nd World War, The Polish Chess Federation was re-established on 30 April 1946 and with the exception of the period between 1950 and 1957 has been continually active till today. The General Delegate Assembly is the highest decision-making body; however, the daily activities are managed by a board consisting of 10 to 15 members elected for four-year terms.

== See also ==
- Polish Chess Championship
