= Dawid Przepiórka =

Polish chess player

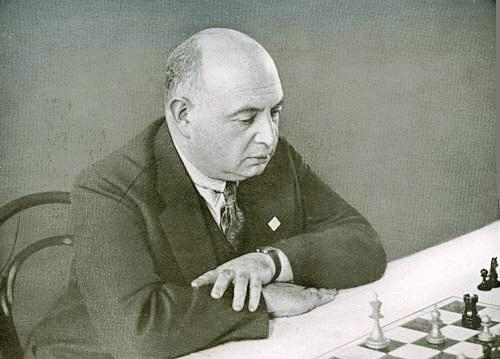
- Przepiórka in the 1930s

Personal information
- Born: Dawid Przepiórka; 22 December 1880 Warsaw, Congress Poland, Russian Empire
- Died: April 1940 (aged 59) Palmiry, Poland

Chess career
- Country: Poland

Dawid Przepiórka (22 December 1880 – presumed April 1940) was a Jewish-Polish chess player of the early twentieth century, who won the first Polish championship.

== Biography ==
Dawid Przepiórka was born 22 December 1880 in Warsaw, Poland (then part of the Russian Empire), to a family of wealthy landowners and entrepreneurs of Jewish extraction. His grandfather, Izrael Przepiórka, built a large house at the crossing of Warsaw's Aleje Jerozolimskie and Nowy Świat Streets, in the very heart of the city. Both the tenement house and the Gastronomia restaurant located there (one of the most popular restaurants in Warsaw between the wars) provided him with steady income.

However, Przepiórka was more interested in mathematics and chess than doing business. He learned to play chess at the age of seven, on his own, as no one in his family knew the game. Declared a prodigy by the age of nine, soon afterward he managed to beat a well-known chess master Jan Taubenhaus.

Shortly before World War I, he left his family company for good and started traveling abroad, devoting himself to chess. Abroad he took part in numerous chess tournaments, winning many of them. His international chess career started in 1926. That year he became the first Polish Champion winning in Warsaw. The same year he also won a notable tournament in Munich (+4 –0 =1) ahead of Rudolf Spielmann and Efim Bogoljubov. He placed second (behind Max Euwe) in the second and last World's Amateur Championship in 1928.

Two years later he was part of the Polish team at the 3rd Chess Olympiad in Hamburg, where he won the gold medal in a team with Akiba Rubinstein, Savielly Tartakower, Kazimierz Makarczyk and Paulin Frydman. The following year, the team won the silver medal at the 4th Chess Olympiad in Prague, being beaten by the United States by one point.

His successes abroad made him popular among the Polish chess community, and he became the deputy chairman of the Polish Chess Federation in the 1930s. Przepiórka took the major responsibility as a chairman of Organizing Committee for 6th Chess Olympiad at Warsaw 1935.

During the 1939 invasion of Poland, his apartment was destroyed and he moved to share an apartment with fellow chess player and his closest collaborator, Marian Wróbel. A Gestapo raid on the apartment in January 1940, during an informal meeting of Warsaw chess players, led to the arrest of all present. The non-Jewish participants were released a week later, Przepiórka and the other Jewish players (including Stanisław Kohn and Moishe Lowtzky and Przepiórka's son-in-law Jakub Rabinowicz) were subsequently executed by the Germans in Palmiry. The exact date of his death is unknown; it is presumed to be April 1940.

== See also ==
- List of Jewish chess players
