= Leon Kremer =

Polish chess player

Leon Kremer (1901–1941) was a Polish chess master.

He played several times in the Warsaw championships, and won in 1929. He also took 6th in 1925 (Stanisław Kohn won), took 4th in 1926 (Abram Blass and Paulin Frydman won), shared 1st with Kohn in 1927, tied for 6-8th in 1928 (Blass won), and took 3rd in 1930 (Frydman won).

He twice represented Warsaw in the Polish team championships at Królewska Huta 1929 and Katowice 1934. He played four times in the Polish championships; took 11th at Warsaw 1926 (Dawid Przepiórka won), took 9th at Lodz 1927 (Akiba Rubinstein won), tied for 12-14th at Warsaw 1935 (Savielly Tartakower won), and tied for 14-16th at Jurata 1937 (Tartakower won).

Kremer played for Poland at sixth board (+14 –4 =2) in 3rd unofficial Chess Olympiad at Munich 1936, and won two silver medals (team and individual).

== See also ==
- List of Jewish chess players
