= Paulino Frydman =

Polish chess player (1905–1982)

- Frydman in 1939

Personal information
- Born: Paulin Frydman; 26 May 1905 Warsaw, Congress Poland, Russian Empire
- Died: 2 February 1982 (aged 76) Buenos Aires, Argentina

Chess career
- Country: Poland (before 1940); Argentina (after 1940)

Medal record

Chess Olympiad

Representing Poland
Bronze medal – third place	2nd Chess Olympiad	1928 team
Gold medal – first place	3rd Chess Olympiad	1930 team
Silver medal – second place	4th Chess Olympiad	1931 team
Bronze medal – third place	5th Chess Olympiad	1933 individual
Bronze medal – third place	6th Chess Olympiad	1935 team
Silver medal – second place	6th Chess Olympiad	1935 individual
Silver medal – second place	3rd unofficial	1936 team
Bronze medal – third place	7th Chess Olympiad	1937 team
Bronze medal – third place	7th Chess Olympiad	1937 individual
Silver medal – second place	8th Chess Olympiad	1939 team
Silver medal – second place	8th Chess Olympiad	1939 individual

Paulino (Paulin) Frydman (26 May 1905 in Warsaw, Poland – 2 February 1982 in Buenos Aires, Argentina) was a Polish chess master.

== Career ==
In 1922, Paulin Frydman took 2nd place, behind Kazimierz Makarczyk in Warsaw. In 1923, he tied for 2nd-4th, behind Alexander Flamberg. In 1926, he shared 1st with Abram Blass, and took 2nd, behind Dawid Przepiórka, in the 1st Polish Chess Championship. In 1927, he tied for 5th-7th in the 2nd POL-ch in Łódź. The event was won by Akiba Rubinstein. In 1928, he tied for 2nd/3rd with Makarczyk, behind Blass. In 1930, he took 4th in Łódź, won in Sopot, and in Warsaw. Frydman won the Warsaw championship four times (1931, 1932, 1933, and 1936).

He played several matches; lost to Jakub Kolski (+0 –2 =0) at Łódź 1922, lost to Salomon Szapiro (+0 –1 =1) at Warsaw 1922, won against Kolski (+1 –0 =1) at Warsaw 1928, drew with Mieczysław Najdorf (+2 –2 =1) at Warsaw 1930, lost to Izaak Appel (+3 –4 =1) at Łódź 1932, and drew with Rudolf Spielmann (+0 –0 =5) in Warsaw in Spring 1935.

Frydman represented Poland eight times in Chess Olympiads:

- 2nd Chess Olympiad at The Hague 1928, second board (+6 –4 =1)
- 3rd Olympiad at Hamburg 1930, reserve board (+3 –2 =4)
- 4th Olympiad at Prague 1931, reserve board (+4 –1 =4)
- 5th Olympiad at Folkestone 1933, second board (+4 –1 =7)
- 6th Olympiad at Warsaw 1935, second board (+7 –0 =9)
- 3rd unofficial Chess Olympiad at Munich 1936, first board (+9 –3 =8)
- 7th Olympiad at Stockholm 1937, third board (+10 –2 =5)
- 8th Olympiad at Buenos Aires 1939, third board (+11 –2 =4).

In all, he took ten Olympic medals (six for a team – one gold at Hamburg, two silver, three bronze, and four individuals – two silver in 1935 and 1939, two bronze in 1933 and 1937). Frydman led the Polish team (2nd place) at Munich 1936. At these events he won 53, drew 42, and lost 16 games (67%).

In 1934, he tied for 3rd/4th with Salo Flohr at Budapest (Ujpest) - Andor Lilienthal won. In the 3rd POL-ch at Warsaw 1935, he tied for 2nd-4th with Najdorf and Henryk Friedman, behind Savielly Tartakower. In October 1935, he won at Helsinki, ahead of Paul Keres, defeating him in their individual game. In April 1936 he tied for 4th/5th at Novi Sad (YUG-ch, Vasja Pirc won).

In July 1936, he took equal 6th at Bad Poděbrady; (Salo Flohr won), despite having led the tournament after nine games with a score of 8–1. Suffering what Andy Soltis describes as a "nervous breakdown" after a loss to Alexander Alekhine, Frydman scored only 1.5 points in his last eight games.

In September 1938, he took 7th at Łódź. In 1939, he shared 2nd, behind Najdorf, in Warsaw.

In September 1939, when World War II broke out, Frydman, like many of the 8th Chess Olympiad participants (Najdorf, Stahlberg, et al.), decided to stay in Argentina permanently.

In September 1939, after the Olympiad, Frydman tied for 5th/6th in Buenos Aires (Circulo, Najdorf and Keres won). He tied for 4th/5th in the Mar del Plata 1941 chess tournament (Gideon Ståhlberg won), took 3rd in Buenos Aires (Bodas de Plata), won in Buenos Aires, and tied for 3rd/4th at Águas de São Pedro/São Paulo 1941 (Erich Eliskases won). In 1942, he had to retire from playing professional chess because of poor health.

Frydman was awarded the International Master title in 1955.

== Notable chess games ==
- Paulin Frydman vs Erik Andersen, The Hague 1928, 2nd Olympiad, Bogo-Indian Defense, E11, 1-0
- Paulin Frydman vs Milan Vidmar, Ujpest 1934, Queen's Gambit Declined Slav, Exchange Variation, D13, 1-0
- Paulin Frydman vs Paul Keres, Helsinki 1935, Queen's Gambit Declined, D52, 1-0
- Paulin Frydman vs Massimiliano Romi, Munich (ol) 1936, Grünfeld Defense, 1-0.
- Paulin Frydman vs Isakas Vistaneckis, Stockholm 1937, 7th Olympiad, QGD, 1-0. A rout!
- Paulin Frydman vs Mieczyslaw (Miguel) Najdorf, Lodz 1938, Slav Defense, Steiner Variation, D16, 1-0
- Paulin Frydman vs Gösta Danielsson, Buenos Aires 1939, 8th Olympiad, Queen's-Indian Defense, 1-0

== See also ==
- List of Jewish chess players
