= Stanisław Kohn =

Polish chess player

Stanisław Kohn (1895–1940) was a Polish chess master.

Kohn played for Poland in 1st unofficial Chess Olympiad at Paris 1924.

In 1925, he won the Warsaw Championship. In 1926, he tied for 3rd-7th, behind Dawid Przepiórka and Paulin Frydman in the 1st Polish Chess Championship in Warsaw. In 1927, he tied for 5-7th in Łódź (2nd POL-ch, Akiba Rubinstein won), and shared 1st with Leon Kremer in the Warsaw Championship.

== See also ==
- List of Jewish chess players
