= Metamodernism =

Movement that emerged from and reacts to postmodernism

Metamodernism is a cultural discourse and paradigm that has emerged after postmodernism. It refers to new forms of contemporary art and theory that respond to modernism and postmodernism and integrate aspects of both together. Metamodernism reflects an oscillation between, or synthesis of, different "cultural logics" such as modern idealism and postmodern skepticism, modern sincerity and postmodern irony, and other seemingly opposed concepts.

Philosophically, metamodern advocates agree with many postmodern critiques of modernism (for example, highlighting gender inequality); however, they often contend that postmodern deconstruction and critical analytic strategies fall short in facilitating desired resolutions. Metamodern scholarship initially focused on interpreting art in this vein and established a foundation for the field, particularly through observing the growing blend of irony and sincerity (or post-irony) in society. Later authors have explored metamodernism in other disciplines as well, with many frequently drawing on integral theory in their approach.

The term "metamodern" first appeared as early as 1975, when scholar Mas'ud Zavarzadeh used it to describe emerging American literature from the mid-1950s, and later notably in 1999 when Moyo Okediji applied the term to contemporary African-American art as an "extension of and challenge to modernism and postmodernism". It wasn't until Vermeulen and van den Akker's 2010 essay "Notes on Metamodernism" that the subject garnered broader attention within academia.

To describe "the structure of feeling" of metamodernism, Vermeulen and van den Akker used the metaphor of a pendulum continually oscillating from the sincere seriousness of modernism to the ironic playfulness of postmodernism.

== Founders of metamodernist theory ==
=== Alexandra Dumitrescu ===
In 2007, writing for the Australian art journal Double Dialogues (Issue Seven), in an essay titled "Interconnections in Blakean and Metamodern Space," the New Zealand writer Alexandra Dumitrescu envisaged a "budding cultural paradigm" that "concurred" with postmodernism, and partly "emerged from it and as a reaction to it." Dumitrescu was the earliest theorist to link the term "metamodern" to a paradigm shift. She began using the word "metamodern" to describe the transition from postmodernism as far back as 2001, and developed her thinking in an article about James Joyce in 2005, following her earlier studies on Finnegans Wake. Her work suggests a move beyond post-modern cynicism toward a more engaged, "metamodern" sensibility found in modern literature. Postmodernism, in Dumitrescu’s analysis in Double Dialogues, was hapless and dying – especially because of its dependency on fragmentation, individualism, and "the preeminence of analysis over synthesis"; in her essay, she described metamodernism as a continuum of revision and interconnectedness: "a boat being built or repaired as it sails, or a palace under continuous construction."

=== Vermeulen and Robin van den Akker ===
Cultural theorists Timotheus Vermeulen and Robin van den Akker published their essay "Notes on Metamodernism" in 2010 and ran an online research blog with the same name from 2009 to 2016. Their work is often considered an attempt to explain post-postmodernism.

According to them, the metamodern sensibility "can be conceived of as a kind of informed naivety, a pragmatic idealism" characteristic of cultural responses to recent global events such as climate change, the 2008 financial crisis, political instability, and the digital revolution. They asserted that "the postmodern culture of relativism, irony, and pastiche" is over, having been replaced by a sensibility that stresses engagement, affect, and storytelling through "ironic sincerity".

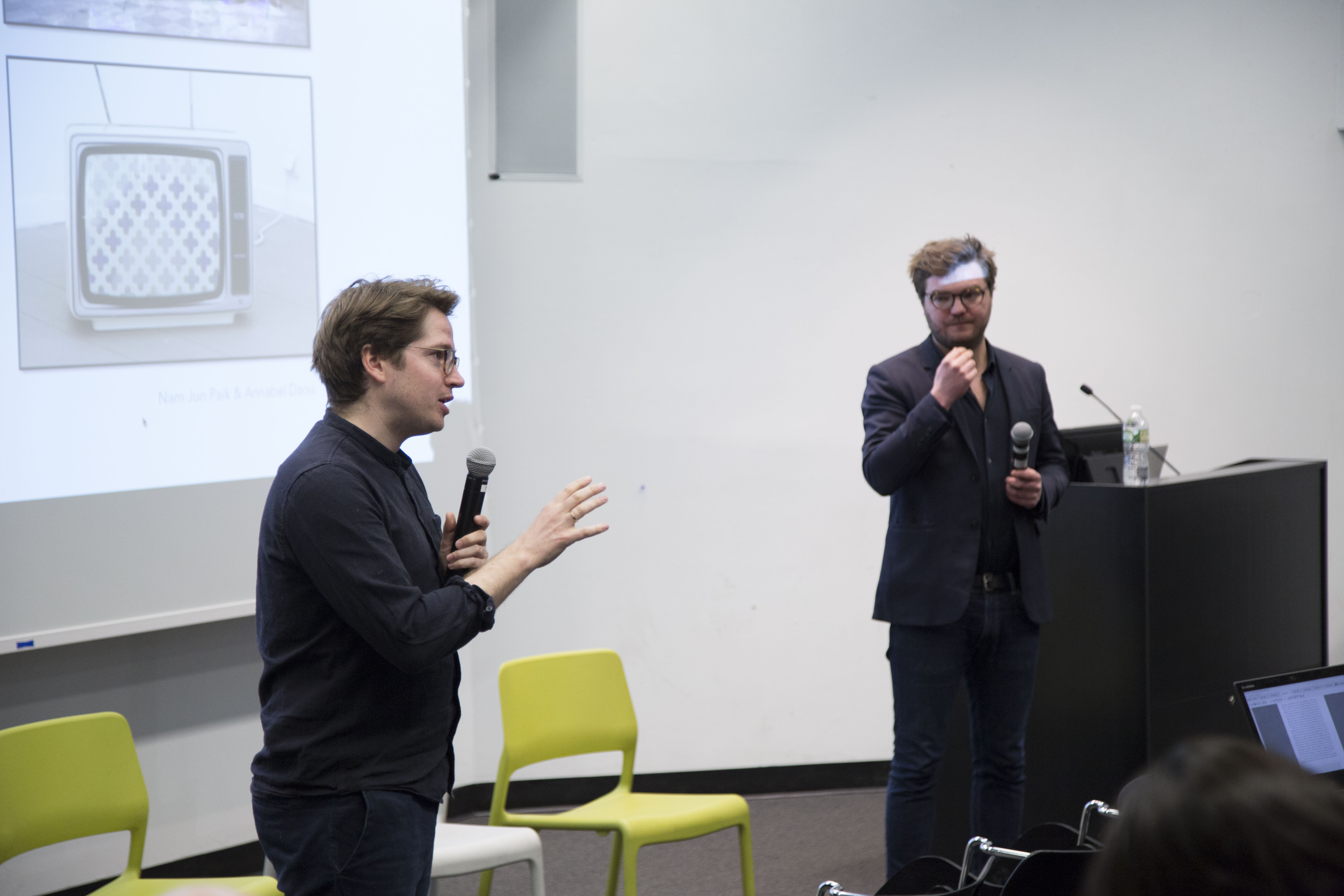
Timotheus Vermeulen and Robin van den Akker at the Between Irony and Sincerity Lecture at Columbia GSAPP

The prefix "meta-" referred not so much to a reflective stance or repeated rumination, but to Plato's metaxy, which denotes a movement between (meta) opposite poles as well as beyond (meta) them. Vermeulen and van den Akker described metamodernism as a "structure of feeling" that oscillates between modernism and postmodernism like "a pendulum swinging... between two opposite poles".

"Ontologically", they write, "metamodernism oscillates between the modern and the postmodern. It oscillates between a modern enthusiasm and a postmodern irony, between hope and melancholy, between naïveté and knowingness, empathy and apathy, unity and plurality, totality and fragmentation, purity and ambiguity. Indeed, by oscillating to and fro or back and forth, the metamodern negotiates between the modern and the postmodern."

For the metamodern generation, according to Vermeulen, "grand narratives are as necessary as they are problematic; hope is not simply something to distrust, love not necessarily something to be ridiculed".

The return of a Romantic sensibility has been posited as a key characteristic of metamodernism, observed by Vermeulen and van den Akker in the architecture of Herzog & de Meuron, and the work of artists such as Bas Jan Ader, Peter Doig, Olafur Eliasson, Kaye Donachie, Charles Avery, and Ragnar Kjartansson. They claim that the neo-romantic approach to metamodernism is done in the spirit of resignifying "the commonplace with significance, the ordinary with mystery, the familiar with the seemliness of the unfamiliar, and the finite with the semblance of the infinite". By doing so, these artists seek to "perceive anew a future that was lost from sight".

Vermeulen asserted that "metamodernism is not so much a philosophy — which implies a closed ontology — as it is an attempt at a vernacular [or] a sort of open source document, that might contextualise and explain what is going on around us, in political economy as much as in the arts". They asserted that the 2000s were marked by a return to typically modern positions, while still retaining the postmodern sensibilities of the 1980s and 1990s.

=== Luke Turner ===
Explicitly drawing upon the work of Vermeulen and van den Akker, Luke Turner published The Metamodernist Manifesto in 2011 as "an exercise in simultaneously defining and embodying the metamodern spirit", describing it as "a romantic reaction to our crisis-ridden moment". The manifesto recognized "oscillation to be the natural order of the world", and called for an end to "the inertia resulting from a century of modernist ideological naivety and the cynical insincerity of its antonymous bastard child". Instead, Turner proposed metamodernism as "the mercurial condition between and beyond irony and sincerity, naivety and knowingness, relativism and truth, optimism and doubt, in pursuit of a plurality of disparate and elusive horizons", and concluded with a call to "go forth and oscillate!" In 2014, the manifesto became the impetus for LaBeouf, Rönkkö & Turner's collaborative art practice, after Shia LaBeouf reached out to Turner after encountering the text, with the trio embarking on a series of metamodern performance projects exploring connection, empathy, and community across digital and physical platforms.

=== Hanzi Freinacht ===
Hanzi Freinacht is the pen-name used by author Emil Ejner Friis and sociologist Daniel Görtz known for publishing The Listening Society: A Metamodern Guide to Politics in 2017. Written as a polemic device, Freinacht plays into common metamodern themes like ironic-sincerity vis-à-vis his performance as a philosopher. Freinacht centrally argues that metamodernism is the natural successor of postmodernism and earlier developmental stages in history by advocating for stage theories.

Freinacht attempts to broadly describe the world under the framing of "symbolic development", arguing that societies can most effectively address their issues through better understanding how developed its people and places are. Broken down at the individual level, inner-personal growth and trends follow patterns that can be found in relation to increasingly complex stages. (Complexity, of which he notes, builds upon Michael Common's definition set out in his Model of Hierarchical Complexity.) Then at the broader societal level, a parallel scale of complexity mediates the relationships between memetics (or units of culture), epistemology, and developmental psychology, ultimately forming the basis of our political systems and everyday lives.

In the collective anthology: Metamodernity: Dispatches from a Time Between Worlds, Görtz describes the concept of stages in his own name:

"It is a tenet of metamodern sociology that perspectives are not arbitrarily ordered, but that they emerge in recognisable patterns... These sequences are, in turn, always dependent upon social and material – ultimately, even biological – conditions, with which they interact. Postmodernism did not emerge before modernism, nor could it have. For this reason, metamodern sociology always looks for meaningful explanatory developmental sequences, putting them in relation to one another on some kind of developmental scale. This developmentalism thus accepts at least some minimal form of stage theories... Each stage must be, in clearly definable terms, either more complex than the former, or, at a minimum, be derived from the former and qualitatively distinct."

=== Jason Ānanda Josephson Storm ===
In 2021, American academic Jason Josephson Storm published Metamodernism: The Future of Theory. In the book, Storm argues for a metamodern method of scholarly research in the social sciences and humanities which requires a "revaluation of values" and a new analytic process. He incorporates Hegelian dialectics to negate what he argues are reflective negatives in postmodern thought, including general skepticism, antirealism, ethical nihilism, and the linguistic turn.

Notable concepts detailed by Storm in the book include his proposition of metarealism, "process social ontology", and "hylosemiotics" (see: process philosophy and semiotics). Storm describes metamodernism in brief as follows:

"Metamodernism is what we get when we take the strategies associated with postmodernism and productively reduplicate and turn them in on themselves. This will entail disturbing the symbolic system of poststructuralism, producing a genealogy of genealogies, deconstructing deconstruction, and providing a therapy for therapeutic philosophy."

In 2024, Storm also launched the academic journal: Metamodern Theory and Praxis as Chair of the Science and Technology Studies department at Williams College. Storm asserts that self-analytical, "anti-disciplinary" thought is needed to effectively engage metamodern ideas in the real world and has stated his work is more about creating a paradigm shift than describing an intellectual movement.

=== Brendan Graham Dempsey ===
In 2023, Dempsey wrote Metamodernism: Or, The Cultural Logic of Cultural Logics, in which he attempted to synthesize the various strands of metamodern discourse to date (e.g., Vermeulen, Storm, Freinacht, etc.) into a single coherent framework based on the idea of "meta" as "recursive reflection". For Dempsey, what all forms of metamodernism have in common is the attempt to move beyond postmodernism by means of postmodernism—a move which requires progressively "decentering" from the postmodern vantage in order to reflect on it as an object of analysis (i.e., "going meta" on postmodernism). This reflective move creates a new orientation that is able to critique the previous perspective from a higher vantage.

However, since this is also the process by which postmodernism distinguished itself from its modernist predecessor, such a dynamic can be seen as an enduring throughline in the development of all cultural logics. As he puts it:

"The claim I'd like to make is that cultural shifts—like those from modernism to postmodernism to metamodernism—reflect society-level manifestations of such recursive, self-reflective moves. Postmodernists come after, objectify, reflect upon, critique, and transcend modernism; metamodernists come after, objectify, reflect upon, critique, and transcend postmodernism; and so on. As they do, genuinely novel insights and sensibilities are generated that justify speaking in terms of distinct cultural phases."

Dempsey sees this "recursive transcendence through iterative self-reflection" operating (implicitly or explicitly) as part of all contemporary articulations of metamodernism. Consequently, he posits that such a "logic" to the unfolding of cultural logics is itself a defining feature of the emerging metamodern worldview:

"In sum, what 'metamodernism' speaks to, I am suggesting, is 1) the cultural moment when the deep recursive process of iterative self-reflection is applied to postmodernism, and thus constitutes an advance beyond the postmodern that includes many of its strategies. In the process, metamodernism becomes 2) the cultural moment when this deep recursive process in cultural shifts becomes an explicit object of reflection and the basis of a new way of seeing. Metamodernism thus becomes a cultural logic about (meta) cultural logics. Thus, with the awareness of the full implications of 'going meta' in eternal recursive reflection, metamodernism entails the necessary inclusion within it of all prior cultural logics (at least insofar as it contains representations of their information in its complexity from a higher vantage). In this way, metamodernism signals an inherently multi-perspectival perspective, one that recognizes its inherent ability to toggle in and out of its own recursive contents."

One notable researcher, Dr. Gregg Henriques, has promulgated a theory which posits "four planes of existence in nature and technology". He lists these four planes as follows: "Matter-object, life-organism, mind-animal, culture-person." He links this to "metamodernism", as aligning with a new way to view reality.

=== Greg Dember ===
In Say Hello to Metamodernism!: Understanding Today’s Culture of Ironesty, Felt Experience and Empathic Reflexivity (2024), Greg Dember builds on Vermeulen and van den Akker’s model of metamodernism as well as Raoul Eshelman’s theory of post-postmodern culture, Performatism. While Dember recognizes the significance to metamodernism of the oscillation between modern and postmodern qualities that Vermeulen and van den Akker described, he identifies the primary motivation of the metamodern sensibility as a preoccupation with the valuing of felt experience. Dember treats this motivation as roughly equivalent to what Eshelman explains as a central motivation in Performatist artworks: the protection of The Subject from the potential relativizing within postmodern, post-structuralist interpretative frameworks. Dember situates the modern-postmodern oscillation as one of eleven “metamodern methods” in contemporary culture:

1. Empathic Reflexivity
2. The Narrative Double Frame (from Eshelman’s Performatism)
3. Oscillation Between Modern and Postmodern Dualities
4. Quirky (from media studies scholar James MacDowell)
5. The Tiny (Metamodern Minimalism)
6. The Epic (Metamodern Maximalism)
7. Constructive Pastiche
8. Ironesty
9. Normcore
10. Over-projection
11. Meta-cute

In Say Hello to Metamodernism! and in other writings, Dember utilizes this model in close readings of cultural artifacts found in a variety of aesthetic areas such as film, television, literary fiction, music, design and marketing, comedy, and contemporary slang. He also emphasizes that metamodernism can be said to characterize much of contemporary thought, in areas such as philosophy and religion, just as modernism and postmodernism have been used to characterize intellectual movements that prevailed during the modernist and postmodern periods.

== Examples in the arts and culture ==
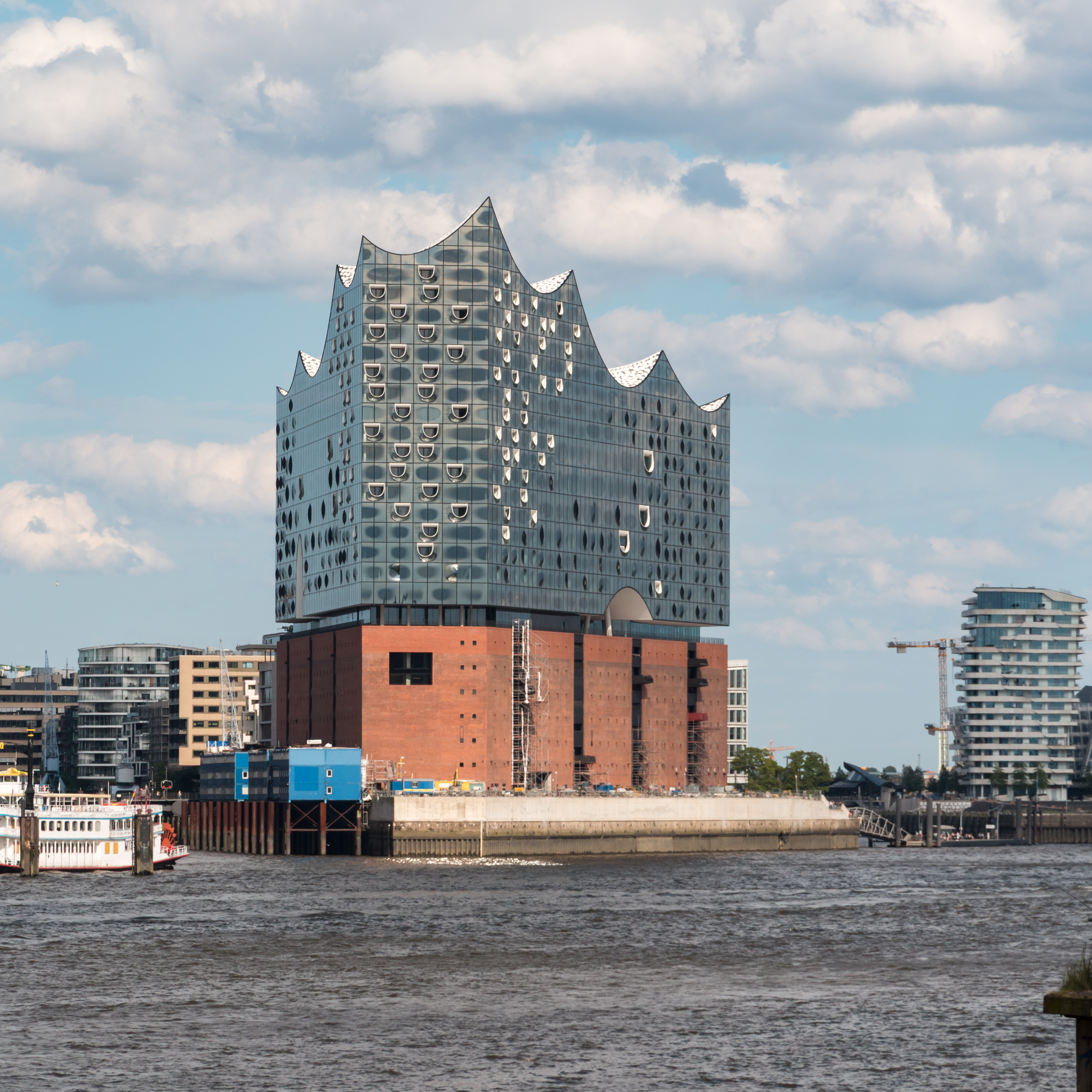
Vermeulen and van den Akker state that the architecture of Herzog & de Meuron is expressive of "attempts to negotiate between such opposite poles as culture and nature, the finite and the infinite, the commonplace and the ethereal, a formal structure, and a formalist unstructuring".

=== Visual arts exhibits ===
The Portland Building designed by Michael Graves (also referred to as the Portland Municipal Services Building), was built in 1982; it is an early example of metamodernism in architecture. Graves's design synchronizes modernist structural integrity with postmodernist visual irony and creativity.

In November 2011, the Museum of Arts and Design in New York staged an exhibition entitled No More Modern: Notes on Metamodernism, featuring the work of Pilvi Takala, Guido van der Werve, Benjamin Martin, and Mariechen Danz.

In March 2012, Galerie Tanja Wagner in Berlin curated Discussing Metamodernism in collaboration with Vermeulen and van den Akker. The show featured the work of Ulf Aminde, Yael Bartana, Monica Bonvicini, Mariechen Danz, Annabel Daou, Paula Doepfner, Olafur Eliasson, Mona Hatoum, Andy Holden, Sejla Kameric, Ragnar Kjartansson, Kris Lemsalu, Issa Sant, David Thorpe, Angelika J. Trojnarski, Luke Turner, and Nastja Säde Rönkkö.

In 2013 Andy Holden staged the exhibition Maximum Irony! Maximum Sincerity 1999-2003: Towards a Unified Theory of M!MS. The exhibition examined the manifesto he had written in 2003 that called for art to be simultaneously ironic and sincere. The exhibition told the history of the writing of the manifesto and subsequently M!MS it now often cited as a precursor to Metamodernism as a "structure of feeling."

Starting 2018 the UK Arts and Humanities Research Council (AHRC) has funded a Metamodernism Research Network. The Network has hosted several international symposia and conferences.

=== In literature ===
In his early writing, David Foster Wallace was fascinated by the artificiality of narrative and drawn to the postmodernist irony of Thomas Pynchon, John Barth, and Donald Barthelme. However, in his 1988 essay, "Fictional Futures and the Conspicuously Young," he asserted that his generation of writers had seen their "literary innocence taken from us without anything substantial to replace it," and he expressed his distrust of those “who claimed to know where literary fiction will go during this generation’s working lifetime.” By 1993, in his essay "E Unibus Pluram: Television and US Fiction," he considered the place of rebellion in art and argued that his former mentors, the "old postmodern insurgents," needed a shake-up: "The next real literary 'rebels' might well emerge as some weird bunch of anti-rebels, born oglers who dare somehow to back away from ironic watching, who have the childish gall actually to endorse and instantiate single-entendre principles. Who treat of plain old untrendy human troubles and emotions with reverence and conviction. Who eschew self-consciousness and hip fatigue. Real rebels, as far as I can see, risk disapproval. The old postmodern insurgents risked the gasp and squeal: shock, disgust, outrage, censorship, accusations of socialism, anarchism, nihilism. Today’s risks are different. The new rebels might be artists willing to risk the yawn, the rolled eyes, the cool smile, the nudged ribs, the parody of gifted ironists, the 'Oh how banal.' To risk accusations of sentimentality, melodrama. Of overcredulity. Of softness."

In his seminal novel Infinite Jest, Foster Wallace's character Hal Incandenza provided a contrast to the postmodern irony of artists such as Andy Warhol and Jackson Pollock. Hal Incandenza wasn't a Pollock "force of nature" or a Warhol "machine." He was something new, and something old, and would not be contained: "I am not a machine. I feel and believe. I have opinions. Some of them are interesting. I could, if you’d let me, talk and talk. Let's talk about anything." In short, David Foster Wallace became a champion of the metamodernist single entendre.

Alison Gibbons has identified several novels as exemplifying a metamodern version of autofiction: Ben Lerner's 10:04, Lance Olsen's Theories of Forgetting, Chris Kraus's I Love Dick and Frédéric Beigbeder's Windows on the World. Gibbons distinguishes metamodern autofiction thus: "[Authors of metamodern autofiction] write out of a postmodernist formulation of fragmented, fictitious textual identity and towards a metamodern affect, whereby subjectivity is linked to an external reality through personal connection and situatedness."

Scholars and critics have pointed to metamodern qualities in many other works of fiction. Some of these are Jennifer Egan's A Visit from the Goon Squad, Zadie Smith's NW, Dave Eggers' A Heartbreaking Work of Staggering Genius, Elif Batuman's Either/Or and The Idiot, Tope Folarin's A Particular Kind of Black Man, Susanna Clarke's Piranesi, Mark Haddon's The Curious Incident of the Dog in the Night-Time, Jenni Fagan's The Waken and several by Ali Smith: How to Be Both, and the four novels that make up her seasonal quartet—Winter, Spring, Summer and Autumn.

Mary Holland identified Don DeLillo's Point Omega as a notably metamodern departure from his previous postmodern work: "... with the concentration of his characteristic tonal evasiveness into the painful precision of Point Omega, DeLillo, never sentimental, moves into the realm of metamodernism, producing fiction that has more in common with the unabashedly connection- and meaning-centered fiction of contemporary writers like Jonathan Safran Foer and David Mitchell than with much of the ficton of his own bleak postmodern past".

Antony Rowland conceptualizes metamodern poetry as that which "resists the enduring bifurcation of contemporary ... poetry into mainstream and 'innovative' writing". In Metamodernism and Contemporary British Poetry, Rowland offers close readings of work by Geoffrey Hill, J.H. Prynne, Geraldine Monk, Ahren Warner, Sandeep Parmar and James Byrne.

=== In film and television ===
James MacDowell, in his formulation of the "quirky" cinematic sensibility, described the works of Wes Anderson, Michel Gondry, Spike Jonze, Miranda July, Paul Thomas Anderson, and Charlie Kaufman as building upon the "New Sincerity", and embodying the metamodern structure of feeling in their balancing of "ironic detachment with sincere engagement". About Paul Thomas Anderson's Punch Drunk Love, MacDowell wrote "There is ... a dual register of feeling to this comedy that requires us to both laugh at [the protagonist] Barry's situation and feel an allegiance with him: we are invited to laugh not at his pain, but only perhaps a little at his naïveté ... and the unbearable awkwardness of his predicament."

Linda Ceriello's work with Greg Dember on popular cultural products such as Joss Whedon's seminal television show Buffy the Vampire Slayer and on Whedon and Goddard's 2012 film The Cabin in the Woods proposed an epistemic taxonomy of the monstrous/paranormal to distinguish the character of metamodern monsters from those which could be read as postmodern, modern or pre-modern.

Bo Burnham's Eighth Grade and Inside have been described as metamodern reactions to growing up with social media.

The 2022 film Everything Everywhere All at Once was explicitly identified by the directors, The Daniels, as a metamodern film.

In 2024, Steve Jones published The Metamodern Slasher Film, "the first monograph to examine film in a sustained way using metamodernism, and the first academic work to analyze horror under a metamodern lens".

Kevin Corbett published The Metamodern Cinema of Taika Waititi in 2026, exploring Waititi's work in both film and television, including Jojo Rabbit, Reservation Dogs, Our Flag Means Death, What We Do in the Shadows, Hunt for the Wilderpeople, Eagle vs. Shark, and Boy. Corbett "highlights how the writer-director embraces the concept of oscillation that lies at the heart of metamodernism's cultural logic by striking an intentional balance between elements that generate insincerity and disengagement and those that invite audiences to sincerely connect with the characters and story."

=== In music and performance ===
In May 2014, country music artist Sturgill Simpson told CMT that his album Metamodern Sounds in Country Music had been inspired in part by an essay by Seth Abramson, who writes about metamodernism on his Huffington Post blog. Simpson stated that "Abramson homes in on the way everybody is obsessed with nostalgia, even though technology is moving faster than ever." According to J.T. Welsch, "Abramson sees the 'meta-' prefix as a means to transcend the burden of modernism and postmodernism's allegedly polarised intellectual heritage."

Singer-songwriter Sufjan Stevens is the subject of the multi-author volume My Impossible Soul: The Metamodern Music of Sufjan Stevens, edited by Tom Drayton, Joshua Busman, Maren Haynes-Marchesini, and Greg Dember. In Say Hello to Metamodernism!, Dember argues that Stephens, along with many other artists including Elliott Smith, The Ben Folds Five, Death Cab for Cutie, and Billie Eilish, is an examplar of a metamodern sensibility that engages "the conlict between [artists] modernist and postmodernist influences by braiding those influences together and making a priority of expressing their felt experience."

The music of contemporary classical composers Ben Nobuto, Oliver Leith, Jennifer Walshe, Robin Haigh, Luke Mombrea, Andy Ingamells, Genevieve Murphy, Neil Luck and Francesca Fargion had been described as metamodern.

Drayton's Metamodernism in Contemporary Theatre: A Politics of Hope/lessness, surveys a new millennial-generation theater that "combines the well-worn postmodern aesthetics of irony, detachment, and deconstruction with a paradoxical interest in authenticity, engagement, and re-construction." The book gives attention to small-scale U.K. theater companies, including Poltergeist, YESYESNONO, Middle Child, and The Gramaphones.

== Other works defining metamodernism ==
=== Essays ===
The 2013 issue of the American Book Review dedicated to metamodernism included a series of essays identifying authors such as Roberto Bolaño, Dave Eggers, Jonathan Franzen, Haruki Murakami, Zadie Smith, and David Foster Wallace as metamodernists.

In a 2014 article in PMLA, literary scholars David James and Urmila Seshagiri argued that "metamodernist writing incorporates and adapts, reactivates and complicates the aesthetic prerogatives of an earlier cultural moment", specifically modernism, in discussing twenty-first century writers such as Tom McCarthy.

In 2013, Professor Stephen Knudsen, writing in ArtPulse, noted that metamodernism "allows the possibility of staying sympathetic to the poststructuralist deconstruction of subjectivity and the self—Lyotard's teasing of everything into intertextual fragments—and yet it still encourages genuine protagonists and creators and the recouping of some of modernism's virtues".

In her 2016 essay, What is Metamodernism and Why Bother? Meditations on Metamodernism as a Period Term and as a Mode, Alexandra Dumitrescu described the foundational development of metamodernism in New Zealand and presented metamodernism as an interrogation of "modernist uprootedness or postmodern drifting." Dumitrescu's essay synthesized her work between 2001 and 2010, describing metamodernism as “a paradigm of integration of faculties (e.g. reason and emotions), systems of thought, and different ontological levels," as well as a paradigm of self-transformation or becoming. She wrote that "the metamodern is a paradigm in which ethical considerations are dominant and in which the disregarded 'other' is increasingly acknowledged and valued: women, the subaltern/colonised, the innocent and the oppressed become central actants in the contemporary cultural discourse. Acknowledging the other is a necessary element of cultural and personal 'becoming,' as Irigaray points out in Sharing the World. As a result of this transformation, values that have been occasionally sidelined in (post)modernity are increasingly revisited and redefined: innocence, the protection of the innocent and the disempowered, compassion, empathy, altruistic love, forgiveness of past injuries, respect for difference, creativity, and ingenuity."

In 2017, Vermeulen and van den Akker, with Allison Gibbons, published Metamodernism: Historicity, Affect and Depth After Postmodernism, an edited collection of essays exploring the notion of metamodernism across a variety of fields in the arts and culture. Individual chapters cover metamodernism in areas such as film, literary fiction, crafts, television, photography and politics. Contributors include the three editors, James MacDowell, Josh Toth, Jöog Heiser, Sjoerd van Tuinen, Lee Konstantinou, Nicole Timmer, Gry C. Rustad, Kuy Hanno Schwind, Irmtraud Huber, Wolfgang Funk, Sam Browse, Raoul Eshelman, and James Elkins. In the introductory chapter, van den Akker and Vermeulen update and consolidate their original 2010 proposal, while addressing the divergent usages of the term "metamodernism" by other thinkers.

An article applying metamodern theory to the study of religions was published in 2017 by Michel Clasquin-Johnson.

In a 2017 essay on metamodernism in literary fiction, Fabio Vittorini stated that since the late 1980s, memetic strategies of the modern have been combined with the meta-literary strategies of the postmodern, performing "a pendulum-like motion between the naive and/or fanatic idealism of the former and the skeptical and/or apathetic pragmatism of the latter".

=== Books on metamodernist theory ===
In 2002, Andre Furlani, analyzing the literary works of Guy Davenport, defined metamodernism as an aesthetic that is "after yet by means of modernism.... a departure as well as a perpetuation". The relationship between metamodernism and modernism was seen as going "far beyond homage, toward a reengagement with modernist method in order to address subject matter well outside the range or interest of the modernists themselves".

In 2013, Linda C. Ceriello proposed a theorization of metamodernism for the field of religious studies, connecting the contemporary phenomenon of secular spirituality to the emergence of a metamodern episteme. Her analysis of contemporary religious/spiritual movements and ontologies posits a shift that is consonant with the metamodern cultural sensibilities identified by others such as Vermeulen and van den Akker, and which has given rise to a distinct metamodern soteriology.

In 2019, Lene Rachel Anderson published her book Metamodernity: Meaning and Hope in a Complex World, in which she claims: "Metamodernity provides us with a framework for understanding ourselves and our societies in a much more complex way. It contains both indigenous, premodern, modern, and postmodern cultural elements and thus provides social norms and a moral fabric for intimacy, spirituality, religion, science, and self-exploration, all at the same time." In November 2023 she moved to working on Polymodernity to differentiate her work on Nordic Bildung from Metamodernity.

== See also ==
- Seth Abramson, journalist and essayist
- Wes Anderson, filmmaker
- Björk, musician
- Brooklyn Immersionists, artists, musicians, and writers
- Don DeLillo, novelist
- Dave Eggers, novelist
- Mikhail Epstein, writer on Russian postmodernism
- David Foster Wallace, novelist and essayist
- Jonathan Franzen, novelist
- Jean Gebser, philosopher, linguist, and poet
- Invented tradition
- Kitsch
- Shia LaBeouf, actor and filmmaker
- Metatheory
- Haruki Murakami, novelist
- New sincerity
- Post-postmodernism
- Arundhati Roy, novelist and social activist
- Zadie Smith, novelist
- Sufjan Stevens, musician
- Stuckism
- Tom Turner, architect and urban planner
- Eric Van Hove, conceptual artist and sculptor
- Ken Wilber, writer on transpersonal psychology
- Duane Rousselle, anarchist psychoanalyst and professor
