= Miled Faiza =

Tunisian-American writer

- ميلاد فايزه
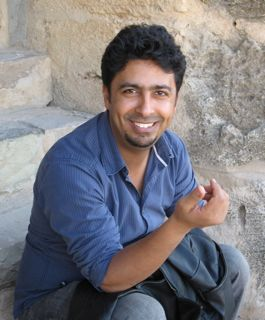
- Born: April 3, 1974 (age 52); Monastir, Tunisia
- Citizenship: American
- Occupation: Writer
- Writing career
- Language: Arabic
- Genre: Poetry

Miled Faiza (Arabic: ميلاد فايزه, romanized: Mīlād Fāyzah; born 1974) is a Tunisian-American writer.

== Career ==
Miled Faiza was born in Monastir, Tunisia in 1974. He published his first book of poetry in 2004 and his poetry has been translated into English, French, Spanish and Serbian.

Faiza is also a translator; his translation of Ali Smith's Autumn was published as al-Kharīf in 2018 and he has also published many translations of American poems into Arabic.

In addition to writing, he was a reviewing editor of the Oxford Arabic Dictionary (2014), and is the co-creator of the Tunisian Arabic Corpus. He has taught Arabic in the United States since 2006 and currently teaches at Brown University.

== Poetry collections ==
- (2019) ʾAṣābiʿ al-naḥḥāt (أصابع النحات (The sculptor's fingers))
- (2004) Baqayā al-bayt alladhī dakhalnāhā maratan wāḥida (بقايا البيت اللذي دخلناه مرة واحدة (Remains of a house we only entered once)

== Translations ==
- (2023) al-Rabīʿ (الربيع), translation of Ali Smith novel Spring
- (2021) The Italian, translation (with Karen McNeil) of Shukri Mabkhout novel al-Talyānī (الطلياني)
- (2019) al-Shitāʾ (الشتاء), translation of Ali Smith novel Winter
- (2017) al-Kharīf (الخريف), translation of Ali Smith novel Autumn
