= Scottish Mortgage Investment Trust Book Awards =

Literary awards organised by Creative Scotland

The Scottish Mortgage Investment Trust Book Awards, formerly known as the Scottish Arts Council Book Awards, Scottish Arts Council Creative Scotland Award (2001), and Sundial Scottish Arts Council Book Awards (2007-2008), were a series of annual literary awards in Scotland that ran from 1972 to 2013. Organised by Creative Scotland (formerly the Scottish Arts Council/SAC), it was sponsored by the Scottish Mortgage Investment Trust (2013), Sundial Properties (at least 2007-2008).

Starting in 2007, the Scottish Arts Council Book Awards have recognised and rewarded Scottish authors in four categories: Fiction (including the short story), Poetry, Nonfiction and First Book. The winners in each category were selected by a panel of judges, and a public vote decided the overall winner of the Book of the Year award. The selected authors either live in Scotland or wrote a book that is of Scottish interest.

In 1999 a new overall prize of £10,000 for the Book of the Year. In 2013 the category winners received £5,000 each, with the Book of the Year winner receiving a further £25,000.

== Winners ==
Year	Category	Title	Author	Reference
1968	Fiction	A Gift from Nessus	William McIlvanney	
1968	Poetry	Stoats in the Sunlight	Stewart Conn	
1970	Book of the Year	Terry Street	Douglas Dunn	
1970	Poetry	Terry Street	Douglas Dunn	
1972	Poetry	Memo for Spring	Liz Lochhead	
1974		<unknown>	Anne Stevenson	
1975	Fiction	Docherty	William McIlvanney	
1975	Poetry	Love or Nothing	Douglas Dunn	
1977	Nonfiction	Jacobite Risings in Britiain	Bruce Philip Lenman	
1978	Fiction	Secrets and Other Stories	Bernard MacLaverty	
1979	Poetry	Under the Ice	Stewart Conn	
1980	Nonfiction	An Economic History of Modern Scotland	Bruce Philip Lenman	
1981	Fiction	Lamb	Bernard MacLaverty	
1981	Book of the Year	Lanark: A Life in Four Books	Alasdair Gray	
1981	First Book	Lanark: A Life in Four Books	Alasdair Gray	
1982	Fiction	A Time to Dance and Other Stories	Bernard MacLaverty	
1982	Poetry	Black Spiders	Kathleen Jamie	
1982	Nonfiction	The Death of Men	Allan Massie	
1985	Nonfiction	Red Sky at Night	John Barrington	
1986	Poetry	Standing Female Nude	Carol Ann Duffy	
1988	Fiction	The Great Profundo and Other Stories	Bernard MacLaverty	
1988	Poetry	The Way We Live	Kathleen Jamie	
1988	First Book	A Case of Knives	Candia McWilliam	
1988	Poetry	The Hoop	John Burnside	
1989	Fiction	A Little Stranger	Candia McWilliam	
1989	Poetry	The Apple Ghost	John Glenday	
1990	Nonfiction	In Xanadu	William Dalrymple	
1990	Poetry	The Other Country	Carol Ann Duffy	
1991	Poetry	Common Knowledge	John Burnside	
1991	First Book	Night Geometry and the Garscadden Trains	A. L. Kennedy	
1992	Poetry	The Adoption Papers	Jackie Kay	
1992		Surviving the Shipwreck and Strange Loyalties	William McIlvanney	
1992		The Luncheon of the Boating Party	Stewart Conn	
1993	Poetry	Mean Time	Carol Ann Duffy	
1993	Fiction	Looking for the Possible Dance	A. L. Kennedy	
1993	First Book	Nil NIl	Don Paterson	
1993 (or 1994)	First Book	Trainspotting	Irvine Welsh	
1994	Poetry	Forked Tongue	W. N. Herbert	
1994	Fiction	Now That You're Back	A. L. Kennedy	
1994	First Book	Pig	Andrew Cowan	
1995	Book of the Year	Free Love and Other Stories	Ali Smith	
1995	First Book	Free Love and Other Stories	Ali Smith	
1995	Fiction	So I Am Glad	A. L. Kennedy	
1996	Poetry	Cabaret McGonagall	W. N. Herbert	
1996	Poetry	Slattern	Kate Clanchy	
1997	Nonfiction	From the Holy Mountain	William Dalrymple	
1997		God's Gift to Women	Don Paterson	
1998	Poetry	The Laurelude	W. N. Herbert	
1999	First Book	Scar Culture	Toni Davidson	
1999	Poetry	Samarkand	Kate Clanchy	
1999	Fiction	Everything You Need	A. L. Kennedy	
1999	Children's Book	Harry Potter and the Chamber of Secrets	J. K. Rowling	
2000	Fiction	Mr Mee	Andrew Crumey	
2001	Book of the Year	Hotel World	Ali Smith	
2001	Fiction	Hotel World	Ali Smith	
2001	Nonfiction	The Golden Peak: Travels in Northern Pakistan	Kathleen Jamie	
2001	Children's Book	Harry Potter and the Goblet of Fire	J. K. Rowling	
2002	Book of the Year	Hotel World	Ali Smith	
2002	Children's Book	Oranges and Murde	Alison Prince	
2003	Book of the Year	White Mughals: Love and Betrayal in Eighteenth-century India	William Dalrymple	
2003	Children's Book	Little Rabbit Lost	Harry Horse	
2004	Book of the Year	Joseph Knight	James Robertson	
2004	Children's Book	The Garbage King	Elizabeth Laird	
2005	Book of the Year	The Tree House	Kathleen Jamie	
2005	Children's Book	Sleepwalking	Nicola Morgan	
2006	Book of the Year	The People's Act of Love	James Meek	
2007	Book of the Year	The Boy and the Sea	Kirsty Gunn	
2007	Fiction	The Boy and the Sea	Kirsty Gunn	
2007	Nonfiction	A Lie About My Father	John Burnside	
2007	First Book	George Mackay Brown: The Life	Maggie Fergusson	
2007	Poetry	Swithering	Robin Robertson	
2008	Book of the Year	A Book of Lives	Edwin Morgan	
2008	Poetry	A Book of Lives	Edwin Morgan	
2008	Fiction	Girl Meets Boy	Ali Smith	
2008	Nonfiction	The Wild Places	Robert Macfarlane	
2008	First Book	Morocco Rococo	Jane McKie	
2009	Book of the Year	Kieron Smith, Boy	James Kelman	
2009	Fiction	Kieron Smith, Boy	James Kelman	
2009	Nonfiction	What Is She Doing Here?: A Refugee's Story	Kate Clanchy	
2009	Poetry	Dear Alice: Narratives of Madness	Tom Pow	
2009	First Book	Moonshine in the Morning	Andrea McNicoll	
2010	Book of the Year	A Passion for Nature: The Life of John Muir	Donald Worster	
2010	Nonfiction	A Passion for Nature: The Life of John Muir	Donald Worster	
2010	Poetry	Outside the Narrative	Tom Leonard	
2010	Fiction	Strip the Willow	John Aberdein	
2010	First Book	Eating Pomegranates	Sarah Gabriel	
2011	Book of the Year	Red Dust Road	Jackie Kay	
2011	Nonfiction	Red Dust Road	Jackie Kay	
2011	Poetry	The Breakfast Room	Stewart Conn	
2011	Fiction	Lyrics Alley	Leila Aboulela	
2011	First Book	The Death of Lomond Friel	Sue Peebles	
2012	Book of the Year	All Made Up	Janice Galloway	
2012	Nonfiction	All Made Up	Janice Galloway	
2012	Fiction	There But For The	Ali Smith	
2012	Poetry	Aibisidh	Angus Peter Campbell	
2012	First Book	Let Not the Waves of the Sea	Simon Stephenson	
2013	Book of the Year	Empire Antarctica	Gavin Francis	
2013	Nonfiction	Empire Antarctica		
2013	Fiction	Close Your Eyes	Ewan Morrison	
2013	Poetry	Small World	Richard Price	
2013	First Book	Tony Hogan Bought Me an Ice-Cream Float Before He Stole My Ma	Kerry Hudson	

== See also ==
- Saltire Society Literary Awards
