= Summer (Smith novel) =

2020 novel by Ali Smith

- Author: Ali Smith
- Language: English
- Publisher: Hamish Hamilton
- Publication date: 2 August 2020
- Publication place: United Kingdom
- Media type: hardback
- Pages: 384 pp.
- ISBN: 9780241207062
- Preceded by: Spring

Summer is a 2020 novel by Scottish author Ali Smith, first published by Hamish Hamilton.

== Summary ==
Each novel in Smith's seasonal series is juxtaposed with a work of Shakespeare – in this one, it is The Winter's Tale. All of the books also topically examine everyday life in Britain. Summer, written between January and summer 2020, covered the conclusion of the Brexit process, and takes in the COVID-19 lockdowns, and Black Lives Matter protests, alongside continuing focus on immigration. Each novel references work of a female artist, in this case, Lorenza Mazzetti.

Summer focuses on teenagers Sacha, a young activist, her brother Robert, a disaffected individualist, children of Grace Greenlaw, a former actress. It brings back characters from the first two books in the quartet, exploring the youth of Daniel Gluck, who compares immigration detention centres to his internment in WWII, as well as the return of Charlotte from the periphery of Winter.
