= Free Love =

Free love is a social movement that accepts all forms of love.

Free Love may refer to:

- Free Love (film), a 1930 film starring Conrad Nagel
- Free Love (album), an album by Sylvan Esso
- "Free Love", a song by Morphine from their 1995 album Yes
- "Free Love", a short story by Ali Smith, part of her book of short stories, "Free Love and Other Stories"
- "Free Love", a song by Cage the Elephant from their self-titled debut album
- "Free Love", a song by Cast from the album Yeah Yeah Yeah

== See also ==
- "Freelove", a 2001 song by Depeche Mode
