= The First Person and Other Stories =

2008 short story collection by Ali Smith

- First edition with quote from Jackie Kay
- Author: Ali Smith
- Cover artist: William Eggleston (photographer)
- Language: English
- Publisher: Hamish Hamilton (UK); Pantheon (US)
- Publication date: 2008 (UK), 2009 (US)
- Publication place: United Kingdom
- Media type: Print & eBook
- Pages: 224
- ISBN: 0-241-14426-4

The First Person and Other Stories is a short story collection by Scottish Booker-shortlisted author Ali Smith, first published in 2008.

== Contents ==
It contains 12 stories:

1. "True Short Story" - A discussion between two men in a cafe discussing the relative merits of novels and short stories is overheard. The narrator (named Ali) rings a friend and continues the argument quoting the views of various authors and the story of Echo and Narcissus from Greek mythology.
2. "The Child" (online text) - A beautiful baby appears in the narrators shopping trolley; seemingly innocent it turns out to be a foul-mouthed misogynist.
3. "Present" (online text from The Times 24 Dec 2005) - A disjointed conversation between a barmaid, a man at the bar and the narrator
4. "The Third Person" - which describes differing 'beguiling scenarios' for a relationship
5. "Fidelio and Bess" - Beethoven's opera Fidelio and George Gershwin's Porgy and Bess are blended together to describe an apparently doomed love affair between two women
6. "The History of History" (online text) - in which a schoolgirl struggles to do her history homework while her mother has a nervous breakdown
7. "No Exit" - The narrator watches a woman leave a cinema auditorium via the fire escape and become apparently trapped in the stairwell
8. "The Second Person" - Two lovers disagree after describing each other's personalities with made-up short stories, one concerning the purchase of an accordion, the other the delivery of a pretentious discourse on Ella Fitzgerald's rendition of "A-Tisket, A-Tasket"
9. "I Know Something You Don't Know" - A boy's mysterious illness causes his mother to ring two healers from the Yellow Pages
10. "Writ" - A middle-aged woman meets her fourteen-year-old self and struggles to communicate with her
11. "Astute Fiery Luxurious" (online text - from The Guardian) A suspect package arrives at a couples house and a series of multiple endings describe its disposal
12. "The First Person" - In which two lovers claim each is describing the other's reality.

== Reception ==
- Katy Guest, writing in The Independent was very positive: "To say that Ali Smith’s new collection is all about language and stories and the nature of truth and fiction would be to do them a terrible disservice. In fact, it would make them sound pretty awful. But this is what they are about." and she concludes "It is as hard to summarise these intricate stories - with their fragile truths and flights of fancy - as it is to explain what makes them wonderful, even if they are about truth and fiction. They are already pared down to the point of perfection. In these and her other collections, Smith has found a format in which her sly wit and dextrous storytelling sing. It might be more helpful just to say: read them."
- Tess Riley, also in The Independent is similarly full of praise "In a tour de force of multiple voices – numerous histories – The First Person celebrates the act of story-telling as a way to keep hold of, and use, the past as a lens through which to view the here and now. This is underlined by the teasing tone Smith adopts to blur different cultures into one outstanding whole." and she finishes with "She has crafted a set of short stories that work together to create a brilliant and thought-provoking collection. The First Person is the essence of "pleasure or whatever"."
- Luckily Beresford reviewed it positively in Literary Review: "Smith’s writing is highly supple, and there is something going on in every sentence. ‘Fidelio and Bess’ describes a woman ironing. ‘But she’s not a prisoner, no.’ I love that sarcastic final word. It’s not Smith’s way to beat you over the head with her ideas, but as with her theatrical venture, her stories are propelled by an immediacy that is seductively inclusive."
- Maria Russo in The New York Times is ambivalent however, "[The Second Person] is Smith at her best, sparkling and zany, fiercely intellectual yet full of humble longing. If only Smith would allow that mischievous, soulful note to sound a little more often. At times these stories are too preachy, too eager to catalog Wrongs Done Unto Women...Smith's rejection of the conventional helps her avoid in both tone and form the “middle-classness” she obviously dreads. Like The Accidental, these stories often inhabit a domestic fictional realm, yet their approach to it is somehow the opposite of domestic realism, with all its implicit links to bourgeois, patriarchal values. That's an interesting and worthy literary project. But her stormy dismissal of the dominant culture can also feel limiting."
- Chris Ross in The Guardian was similarly unconvinced, "the best pieces in this collection have a breezy, fleeting quality, like snatches of conversation overheard through an open window. Smith has a knack for capturing the deep intimacy that underlies, say, a couple's casual bickering, and for rendering the uncanny tendency of chance encounters to feel both unexpected and familiar...But alongside such savvy writing there is too much contrivance."
