= Tomas Björkman =

Swedish financier

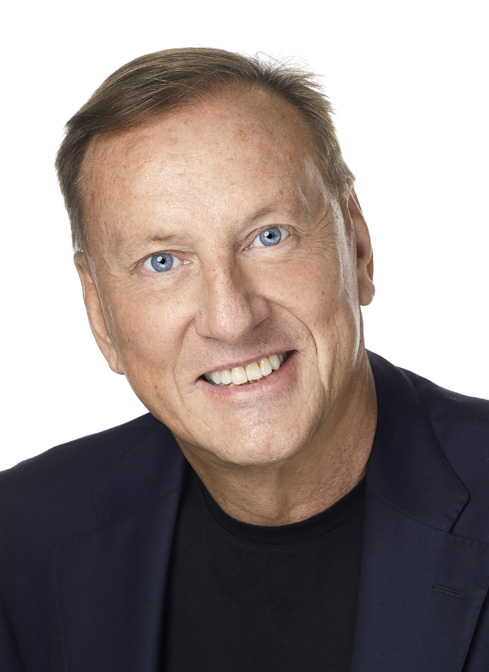
- Björkman in 2018
- Born: 3 March 1958 (age 68); Borås, Sweden
- Occupations: Social entrepreneur and author

Tomas Björkman (born 3 March 1958) is a Swedish financier, social entrepreneur and author. Björkman has worked in Stockholm and Geneva and is based in London.

== Education ==
Björkman was born in Borås, Sweden. He studied natural sciences at Bäckängskolan in Borås and went on to earn a Bachelor's Degree in physics from Uppsala University and a Master of Science from the University of Sussex.

== Career ==
In 1990 Björkman founded IBP Fondkommission AB, the first company to introduce structured financial instruments to Scandinavia. When he moved to Geneva in 1996 to start a similar venture, the company had brokerage offices in Stockholm, Gothenburg, Malmö, Oslo and Helsinki. When operations were sold to the Swiss banking group EFG in 2001, Björkman became chairman of the board, of what became the EFG Investment Bank in Stockholm.

Parallel to finance, Björkman was an active entrepreneur in IT and real estate.

== Community engagement ==
After leaving the world of finance in 2006, Björkman established the Ekskäret Foundation in 2008. The foundation has developed a conference facility on Ekskäret island (Oak Island) in the Stockholm archipelago. The foundation aims to facilitate conscious and sustainable social development, placing particular emphasis on the connection between internal, personal and community development.

In 2010, Björkman was a founding member of the Swedish youth association Protus. The association facilitates a range of annual activities for young people focusing on life long learning and philosophical exploration.

In 2016, he founded the Research Institute Perspectiva in London together with Jonathan Rowson. The aim of the institute is to inspire our political, academic and business leaders to examine real world problems with a deeper appreciation of the influence of our inner worlds.

In 2017, in partnership with the Norrsken foundation, Björkman launched the digital platform 29k.org. The platform aims to help you reconnect with yourself, like-minded people and what you value most in life.

Björkman has been a member of the Club of Rome since 2014. The Club of Rome describes itself as "an organisation of individuals who share a common concern for the future of humanity and strive to make a difference”. Björkman is also a fellow of the Royal Swedish Academy of Engineering Sciences and a fellow of the World Academy of Art and Science. He is also co-funder and chair of the Inner Development Goals Foundation.

== Writings ==
Björkman has published three books:

- In The Market Myth (2016), he analyzes the market as a social construction and reveals a number of common misconceptions about market strengths and weaknesses.
- The Nordic Secret (2017, editor), written by Lene Rachel Andersen, explores how the Nordic countries invented a new kind of education, developed everybody’s potential and changed their fate. Large-scale investment in personal development and education is outlined as a decisive cause of success.
- In The World We Create, (2019), Björkman draws a systemic overall picture of social development, integrating external naturalistic and internal phenomenological perspectives with postmodern social criticism into an early narrative of metamodernism.

== Bibliography ==
- The Market Myth. Fri Tanke publishing house, 2016. ISBN 9789187935633
- The Nordic Secret: A European story of beauty and freedom. Co-authored by Lene Rachel Andersen. Fri Tanke publishing house, 7 November 2017. ISBN 9188589102
- The World We Create: From God to Market. Perspectiva Press, 27 September 2019. ISBN 9781912892594
