= Bread on Uncle Milad's Table =

2021 book by Mohamed Alnaas

- Author: Mohamed Alnaas
- Genre: Novel
- Published: 2021
- Publisher: Rashm
- Awards: 2022 International Prize for Arabic Fiction, winner

Bread on Uncle Milad's Table (Arabic: خبز على طاولة الخال ميلاد) is the debut novel by Libyan author Mohamed Alnaas which won the 2022 International Prize for Arabic Fiction (IPAF). The novel is the first from Libya to win the award. The novel depicts the life of a husband who abandons traditional gender roles to stay at home and maintain the household while his wife is in paid employment. Shukri Mabkhout, chair of the judges' panel for the 2022 IPAF, noted the novel is "unified by a gripping narrative, which offers a deep and meticulous critique of prevailing conceptions of masculinity and femininity and the division of work between men and women, and the effect of these on both a psychological and social level."
