= Mohamed Alnaas =

Libyan writer

Mohammed Alnaas (Arabic: محمد النعاس) (born 1991) is a Libyan writer born in Tajoura (an eastern suburb of Tripoli). His debut novel Bread on Uncle Milad's Table won the 2022 International Prize for Arabic Fiction. AlNaas's other writings and essays have appeared in various Arabic and English journals and media platforms.

== Early life ==
Mohamed Alnaas was born in Tripoli, in 1991. He studied Electrical Engineering at the University of Tripoli and graduated in late 2014. He worked as a technical engineer for about a year until he finally quit engineering to focus on writing in late 2015. He gained recognition for his writing in subsequent years, and in 2020 his short story collection Blue Blood was published. In 2022, he won the International Prize for Arabic Fiction for his debut novel, which made him a household name in Libya.

== Style ==
Shukri Mabkhout, chair of the judges' panel for the 2022 IPAF, noted the novel is "unified by a gripping narrative, which offers a deep and meticulous critique of prevailing conceptions of masculinity and femininity and the division of work between men and women, and the effect of these on both a psychological and social level.

== Awards and honours ==
- 2022: International Prize for Arabic Fiction for Bread on Uncle Milad's Table
