= Lene Rachel Andersen =

Danish writer and publisher

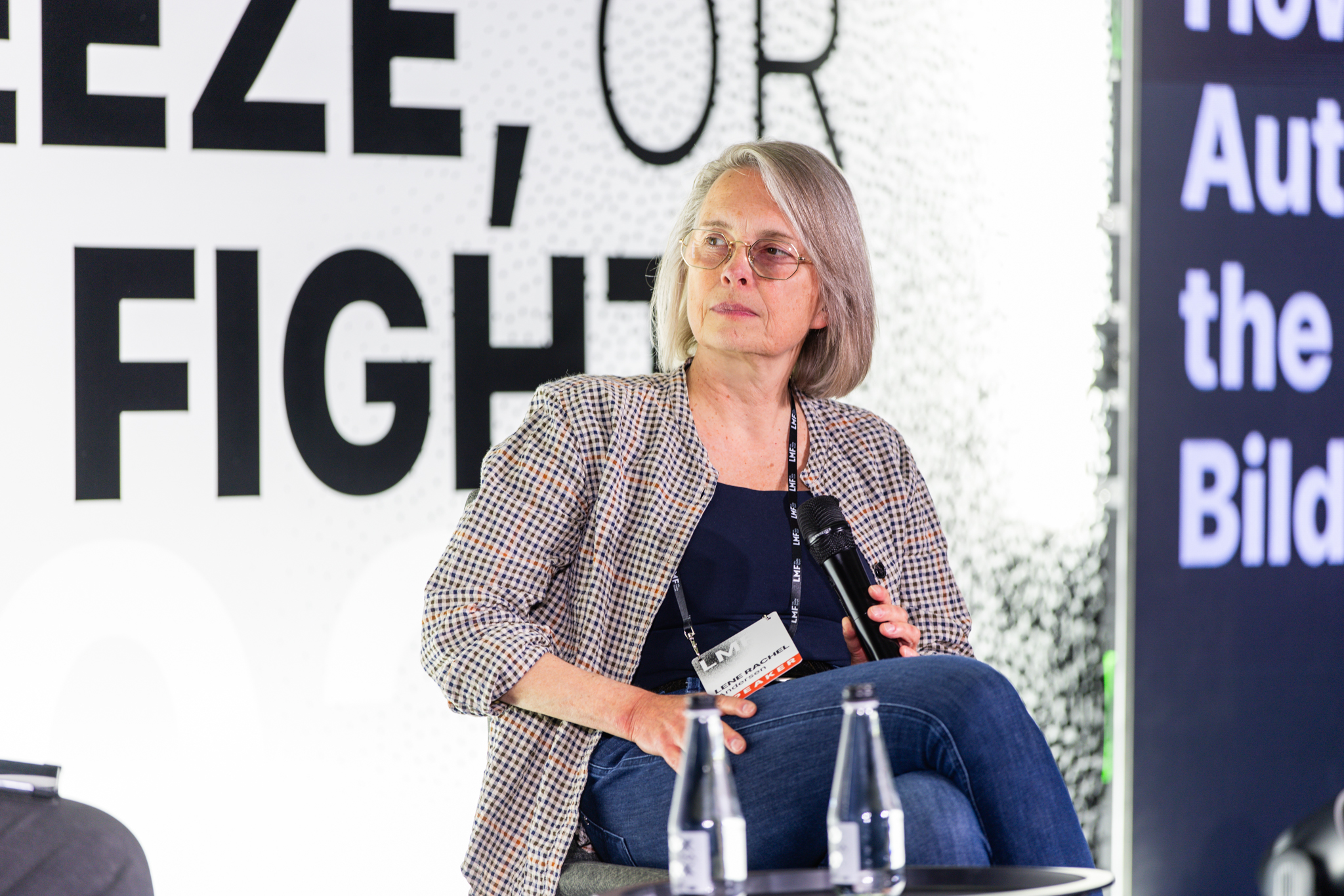
Andersen in 2026

Lene Rachel Andersen (born May 15, 1968) is a Danish author, economist, futurist, and philosopher. She was born and raised in Taastrup, a suburb west of Copenhagen, Denmark. Her first books formed the series Baade-Og. her books in English are The Nordic Secret (2017), Metamodernity (2019), Bildung (2020), What is Bildung? (2021, online), and Libertism (2022). In 2018, Andersen co-founded the Copenhagen based think-tank Nordic Bildung and the folk-Bildung association Fremvirke. In 2019, she was the main initiator of European Bildung Day and in 2020 the co-founder of the European Bildung Network. Since January 2019, Andersen has been a member of the Club of Rome.

== Biography ==
From age 16, Andersen produced radio programs and wrote scripts for radio and television satire.

After studying business economy for three years, Andersen worked as a temp teacher and a temp secretary for two years before she studied theology for four years with the specific goal become a pastor in the Danish Evangelical Lutheran Church. During her years of theology studies, she wrote entertainment for Danish television, in 1993, she had a religious crisis and quit her studies when she decided to convert to Judaism.

Andersen's debut as an author was in 2005, when she published the first book in the five volume and 2,300 page book series Baade-Og (eng. Both-And, 2005–2009). She has since written several books, among them Democracy Handbook, which is also a website: www.democracy-handbook.org. She also wrote The Nordic Secret: A European Story of Beauty and Freedom (2017) edited by Tomas Björkman. Her latest book is Libertism: Grasping the 21st Century.

Andersen leads Det Andersenske Forlag (Andersenske Publishing), an independent publisher in Denmark that focuses on popularizing philosophy and topics essential to democracy.

In 2011, Andersen was appointed as a member of the Danish government's short-lived Værdikommissionen (Values Commission).

In 2018, Andersen co-founded the thinking lab Nordic Bildung. Today she is president of the organization, which is the main organizer of Global Bildung Network, Global Bildung Day, and other bildung networks and events.

== Baade-Og ==
The book series Baade-Og (Both-And), consists of five books with the subtitles Monday, Tuesday, Wednesday, Thursday, and Friday. They are written as a dialogue between the retired television producer Cornelius Magnussen, who is highly erudite and currently admitted to the psychiatric ward, and a lifestyle journalist, Tenna E. Rasmussen, who interviews him for five days.

Over the course of the five days, they cover Big History and a number of scientific theories explaining how nature and culture evolve: scale-free networks, thermodynamics, chaos theory, complexity theory, the concepts of memes and meme-plexes, and evolution itself plus a host of other sciences in order to explore how culture and civilization evolve. It is all connected in what Andersen calls Global Existentialism: what kind of species do we want to be?

The scientific theories are thus linked together and put in new contexts, e.g. Darwin's evolutionary theory is compared to Kierkegaard's teachings about the three stages in life. In the Wednesday-part, the protagonist Magnussen formulates a declaration of "global existentialism" which departs from the old perception of the world characterized by the linear, absolute and inflexible. Instead, the proposed new world view takes into account relativity, complementarity, and quantum theory, posing that everything is unpredictable, complex, and cannot be described in absolute terms. Here the concept of "Homo Liquens" (the liquid human being) is introduced, as opposed to being "one or the other", which refers to Kierkegaard's Either-Or. Global Existentialism must also be political since human beings have a universal civil obligation. In order to preserve the rule of law, humanity, democracy, and pluralism, approaches that embrace "both and" are needed for global and complex solutions.

Andersen's later books in Danish, such as Globalt gearskift (Globally Shifting Up, 2014) also approach the complexity of the future and how we can prepare for it.

== The Nordic Secret ==
The Nordic Secret: A European Story of Beauty and Freedom, which Andersen wrote, edited by Tomas Björkman, was published November 2017.

In this book, Andersen and Björkman explore why Nordic countries repeatedly score in the top-ten of the happiest countries and the best countries for business worldwide. The text traces the success of the Nordic countries to the invention of folk high schools in Denmark in 1844. It notes that the schools were not initially successful, but after the Danish military defeat to Bismarck's Prussia in 1864, a movement started in Denmark that started the schools on their path to success and promulgation. The 1860s was also when the concept of the folk high schools was copied in Norway and Sweden; later folk high schools were started in Finland as well.

Through the folk high schools, the Nordic countries have created a culture of civic responsibility, cultural self-awareness, and high expectations of individual moral and emotional development.

== The Nordic Metamodern Series ==
Between 2019-2022, Andersen wrote a three-part series in support of the Nordic Bildung Network and its endeavors. The three titles in the series are Metamodernity: Meaning and Hope in a Complex World (2019), Bildung: Keep Growing (2020), and Libertism: Grasping the 21st Century.

== Metamodernity ==
In 2019, Andersen wrote Metamodernity: Meaning and Hope in a Complex World. Unlike most versions of metamodernism, which generally integrate only modernity and postmodernism, in Metamodernity, Andersen explores the possible integration of indigenous, premodern, modern, and postmodern cultural code into one future cultural code that can serve as a model for meaning-making in the 21st century. The advantage of integrating all four cultural codes into metamodernity rather than just two cultural codes into metamodernism, is the deeper potential for meaning-making that this offers.

The books then lays out a framework for understanding ourselves and our societies in a complex way that matches the complexity of the globalized world in which we already live. Andersen asserts that by integrating both indigenous, premodern, modern, and postmodern cultural elements, metamodernity provides social norms and a moral fabric for intimacy, spirituality, religion, science, and self-exploration, all at the same time. She prescribes this as the best way to strengthen local, national, continental, and global cultural heritage among all people. The book makes the case that metamodernity is more inclusive than just culture—that it can also protect the economy from the internet and exponential technologies that are disrupting humanity's current modes of societal organization and governance. Metamodernity, according to Andersen, will thus allow us to conduct meaning-making at a deeper emotional level and a higher intellectual level compared to today; it will allow us more complex understanding, which may match the complexity of the problems we need to solve.

== Bildung ==
Andersen's latest book is Bildung: Keep Growing (2020). The first half of this book is a condensed version of The Nordic Secret; the second half contains both a theoretical exploration of why and how folk-bildung affected Scandinavian youth and society as of the 1860s, and a new and more concise vocabulary for dealing with bildung in the 21st century.

Among the models used as analytical tools in the second half of the book are the cultural codes explored in metamodernity, Circles of Belonging and The Bildung Rose.

The Circles of Belonging model explores 10 circles or spheres of consciousness, belonging, identity, solidarity, conscience, and sense of responsibility. The ten Circles are: 1: Self, 2: Family One (where we grow up), 3: Peer groups, 4: Family Two (the family we establish ourselves), 5: Local communities, 6: Nation and/or religion, 7: Culture Zone, 8: Humanity today, 9: All life on the planet now, and 10: Life as such, now and in the future. Circles 2-5 are real communities, whereas Circles 6-10 are what Benedict Anderson referred to as imagined communities.

=== The Bildung Rose ===
The Bildung Rose explores how societies evolve, grow and become more complex across seven domains: 1) production; 2) technology; 3) knowledge/science; 4) ethics; 5) narrative; 6) aesthetics, and 7) power. Since we need to understand our society in order to thrive, the model thus connects our inner worlds to society. Understanding the relationship between self and society is increasingly crucial as societies become more complex.

=== What is Bildung? ===
In 2021, Andersen wrote What is Bildung and how does it relate to ALE? in support of the Bildung project co-funded by the European Association for the Education of Adults (EAEA) and Erasmus+ Key Action 2 (KA2). The project is in the Adult Learning and Education (ALE) sector, and has a Europe-based focus. Its first output was this comprehensive paper explaining the concept of bildung and how it can be used effectively in ALE. While the text begins with a brief recap of bildung's history and philosophy, its content is primarily hands-on. It first lays out how bildung distinguishes itself from today's mainstream ALE. Next, it makes bildung tangible and applicable for ALE educators by explaining the aspects of transferable knowledge and understanding (illustrated by the Bildung Rose), non-transferable knowledge and understanding, expansion of the sense of responsibility (illustrated by Circles of Belonging), and civic empowerment that comprise it. The text then synthesizes the four aspects by exploring what kind of bildung is needed in 21st century Europe, and finally, suggests approaches for developing bildung content and methods in existing ALE programs.

== Libertism ==
Andersen's third book and central concept in the Nordic Metamodern Series is Libertism: Grasping the 21st Century, published in 2022. Libertism builds on the concepts of integrating the best of humanity's cultural codes and values systems in Metamodernity: Meaning and Hope in a Complex World, and the exploration of human potential for emotional and moral development in Bildung: Keep Growing, to lay out a third pillar: libertism. Andersen presents libertism as a broad framework for understanding the contemporary, complex world—its systems, ideologies, potentials and dangers—and the specific kinds of freedoms humanity needs to make the most beneficial, meaningful existential choices it can in the century ahead.

The first chapter is a condensed big history course outlining the 18 basic systems that define the universe and the patterns they produce that frame existence. It includes Henriques’ concept of joint points (major upshifts in complexity), of which there have been four thus far. Reaching the present day, Andersen introduces some of the most significant dangers humanity now faces, and then begins narrating how to proceed by delineating and reconstructing the concept of freedom. She identifies and defines 21 types of freedom she deems as essential for humanity to understand and balance in the century ahead. Next, Andersen conducts an investigation of human meaning-making—its realities and limitations—and the need to make human understanding as culturally global, well-educated, and human species-wide as possible. She asserts that freedoms and meaning-making allow us to consider the successes and failures of the one successful, existent model humanity has for future development—liberal democracy—to include the things about it that must change to continue its viability. The challenges to and even prospects of failure of existing human systems—to include that of nation states—are then explored in depth. In the latter chapters, Andersen proposes a path to understanding current day challenges and those of the near-future (even the coming of a 5th joint point) by adopting the concept of libertism—how humanity can consider concepts described in the previous chapters and make meaningful choices for itself, starting now. According to Andersen, libertism will work because it proposes considerations within four dominant memeplexes in our current civilization and includes tenets for new ways of thinking. Libertism also culls still-useful aspects of current systems in order for humanity to rethink its choices moving forward. Lastly, the book outlines very different visions of humanity's potential future: the first is a world based on the integrative, imaginative, democratic and cultural tenets of metamodernity; the second is the technology-driven, highly-controlled, extractive and exploitive world of hypermodernity.

=== The 21 Freedoms ===
One of Andersen's models in Libertism is that of the 21 Freedoms. She explains that freedoms have many different types that are not isolated, nor are they absolute. Rather, they are an interplay of collective narratives, personal emotions, societal institutions, rules, regulations, responsibilities, temptations, consequences, and natural boundaries. According to Andersen, humanity needs all of the freedoms to function well—operating interactively and in balance—in order to enjoy as much as possible of all of them and keep them all viable. Andersen also posits a central paradox of freedom: as it expands, it adds obligations and responsibility as well. Her answer to this challenge is that libertism allows us to balance freedom from, and freedom to, in order to safeguard freedoms of (combined, these are liberties/political freedoms); which, in turn, upholds institutions that support our existential freedom (bildung).

== Awards and recognition ==
Andersen has received two Danish awards for her books:

- In 2007 she was awarded the Ebbe Kløvedal Reichs Demokratistafet (The Ebbe Kløvedal Reich Democracy Baton, named after Danish author Ebbe Kløvedal Reich). The recipients of the prize are characterized by bringing the political debate to something beyond the usual.
- Andersen received Doessingprisen (the Danish librarians’ award) in 2012 for her work in supporting and promoting democracy, debate and diversity.

== Bibliography ==
=== In English ===
- Andersen, Lene Rachel (2017). Testosteroned Child. Sad. Or the dawning of a new Renaissance? (1 ed.). Det Andersenske Forlag. ISBN 9788792240705.
- Andersen, Lene Rachel (November 7, 2017). Björkman, Tomas (ed.). The Nordic Secret: A European story of beauty and freedom (1 ed.). Fri Tanke. ISBN 978-9188589101.
- Andersen, Lene Rachel (2019). Metamodernity: Meaning and Hope in a Complex World, Nordic Bildung. ISBN 9788793791015.
- Andersen, Lene (2020). Bildung: Keep Growing. Nordic Bildung. ISBN 9788793791084.
- Andersen, Lene (2022). Libertism: Grasping the 21st Century ISBN 978-8793791183.
- Wiki-project democracy-handbook.org, from 2010

=== In Danish ===
==== Baade-Og ====
- Knallhatt, jesper (June 17, 2005). Baade-Og (in Danish). Vol. 1. part. Mandag (1 ed.). Det Andersenske Forlag. ISBN 9788799045600.
- Knallhatt, jesper (September 19, 2006). Baade-Og (in Danish). Vol. 2. part. Tirsdag (2 ed.). Det Andersenske Forlag. ISBN 9788799045624.
- Knallhatt, jesper (October 24, 2007). Baade-Og (in Danish). Vol. 3. part. Onsdag (1 ed.). Det Andersenske Forlag. ISBN 9788799045662.
- Knallhatt, jesper (October 30, 2008). Baade-Og (in Danish). Vol. 4. part. Torsdag (1 ed.). Det Andersenske Forlag. ISBN 9788799045686.
- Knallhatt, jesper (October 26, 2009). Baade-Og (in Danish). Vol. 5. part. Fredag (1 ed.). Det Andersenske Forlag. ISBN 9788799045693.

==== Other ====
- Andersen, Lene (December 1, 2005). Grantræet (in Danish) (1 ed.). Det Andersenske Forlag. ISBN 9788799045617.
- Andersen, Lene (2007). Frihed og demokrati (in Danish) (1 ed.). Det Andersenske Forlag. ISBN 9788799045648.
- Andersen, Lene (August 18, 2011). Det åbne samfund og dets venner (in Danish) (1 ed.). Lene Andersen. ISBN 9788792240279.
- Knallhatt, Jesper (May 5, 2013). Fire uetiske mænd i sengen (in Danish) (1 ed.). Lene Andersen. ISBN 9788792240279.
- Andersen, Lene (November 4, 2013). Danmark 2030 (in Danish) (1 ed.). Det Andersenske Forlag. ISBN 9788792240460.
- Andersen, Lene (May 5, 2014). Globalt gearskift (in Danish) (1 ed.). Det Andersenske Forlag. ISBN 9788792240552.
- Andersen, Lene (September 26, 2017). Fremtidens velfærd, fremtidens by – Et urbant gearskift (in Danish) (1 ed.). Det Andersenske Forlag. ISBN 978-87-92240-75-0.

== External references ==
- "About Both-And". www.baade-og.dk/english/.
- "knallhatt.dk – hva computern gemte..." knallhatt.dk.
- "Det Andersenske Forlag – Gør det sjovt at blive klogere!". andersenske.dk.
- "democracy-handbook.org". Archived from the original on May 10, 2017.
- "Lene Andersen". www.dfs.dk. Dansk Folkeoplysnings Samråd. Archived from the original on May 30, 2016.
- "Next Scandinavia – Meaningful growth". www.nextscandinavia.com.
- "The Nordic Secret – A European Story". www.nordicsecret.org.
- "Ebbe Kløvedal Reichs Demokratistafet". www.deo.dk/boeger/demokratistafetten/.
- "Demokratistafetten". www.grundtvig.dk/vartov/kalender/ebbe-reichs-demokratistafet.html.
- "Doessingprisen". www.bf.dk/OmOs/Doessingprisen. Archived from the original on May 3, 2016.
- "Kierkegaard ville have varæt stolt". www.information.dk/kultur/anmeldelse/2008/06/kierkegaard-vaeret-stolt. June 4, 2008.
- "The Bildung Rose". nordicbildung.org/publication/the-bildung-rose. October 19, 2019.
