= The Whole Story and Other Stories =

2003 short story collection by Ali Smith

- First edition with quote from Jeanette Winterson
- Author: Ali Smith
- Cover artist: Rachel Whiteread
- Publisher: Hamish Hamilton
- Publication date: 2003
- Publication place: United Kingdom
- Media type: Print & eBook
- Pages: 192
- ISBN: 0-241-14110-9

The Whole Story and Other Stories is a short story collection by Scottish Booker-shortlisted author Ali Smith, first published in 2003 by Hamish Hamilton.

It contains twelve stories :-

1. "The Universal Story" : A man buys up every copy of The Great Gatsby in a second-hand bookshop. The narrative focus switches between the proprietor, a 1974 Penguin edition of the book, a fly landing on it, and the man, who it transpires is buying every copy of the book he can find for his sister, who is constructing a boat out of them financed by an Arts Council grant...
2. "Gothic" : Gives an insight into the life of a bookshop clerk and the eccentricities of the customers and how she deals with them.
3. "Being Quick" : A traveller returning home sees Death on the concourse of King's Cross station; later, a fatality on the line delays the train and the traveller decides to walk the remainder of the journey but cannot phone home as her mobile phone has died...
4. "May": A woman falls hopelessly in love with a neighbour's tree...
5. "Paradise" : Follows the live of three Scottish sisters; one a shift manager in a fast-food restaurant (who single-handedly foils an armed raid); the second is a hostess on a boat taking day-trips on Loch Ness and the third is drunk in a cemetery vandalising angels.
6. "Erosive" : An Apple tree is infested with aphids, the owner falls in love...
7. "The Book Club" :A young girl borrows books from a bookseller, reading them carefully so they can still be sold; later her mother joins a book club...
8. "Believe Me" :A woman admits to her female lover that she is married and spends her days with her husband. Her lover then admits she is also having an affair with him...
9. "Scottish Love Songs" : An elderly lady is haunted by a Pipe Band who continually march through her house playing, rendering her all but deaf...
10. "The Shortlist Season" : A young woman believes herself to be allergic to modern art...
11. "The Heat of the Story" : Three drunk women stagger into Midnight Mass...
12. "The Start of Things" : A lover is locked out on a cold winter night...
