= Hotel World =

Novel by Ali Smith

- Author: Ali Smith
- Language: English
- Genre: Novel
- Publisher: Hamish Hamilton
- Publication date: 29 March 2001
- Publication place: United Kingdom
- Media type: Print (Paperback and hardback)
- Pages: 236 pp (first edition, hardback)
- ISBN: 0-241-14109-5
- OCLC: 45338234
- Dewey Decimal: 823/.914 21
- LC Class: PR6069.M4213 H68 2001b

Hotel World is a 2001 novel written by Ali Smith, published by Hamish Hamilton. It won both the Scottish Arts Council Book Award (2001) and the Encore Award (2002).

== Plot introduction ==
There are five characters, two relatives, three strangers, but all female. There is a homeless woman, a hotel receptionist, a hotel critic, the ghost of a hotel chambermaid, and the ghost's sister. These women tell a story, and it is through this story that unbeknownst to them their lives and fates intersect. The catalyst of their story is the Global Hotel.

== Plot summary ==
Hotel World is divided into five sections. The first section, “Past” tells the story of Sara Wilby

The second part, "Present Historic", is about a homeless girl (Else) begging for money outside the Hotel.

The “Future Conditional”, the third section of the novel, Lise, a receptionist.

The fourth part is “Perfect” which centers a far from perfect character named Penny.

The fifth section of the novel titled “Future in the Past,” is entirely Clare's memories on the life and death of her sister Sara.

“Present” is the title of the last part of the novel.

== Characters in Hotel World ==
Hotel World is told from the perspective of five different women who as fate would have it cross paths and in doing so affect each other's lives through moments spent together. Each character is unique in that they each signify a different stage of the grieving process, a theme prevalent throughout the entire novel.

Sara Wilby – a teenage hotel chambermaid who has fallen to her death in a hotel dumbwaiter. She is the daughter to her parents Mr. and Mrs. Wilby, and also older sister to Clare.

Elspeth Freeman – an older homeless woman suffering from tuberculosis, she daily sits on the streets begging the people passing by to “spare some change.” When first introduced to the reader, Elspeth is referred to only as Else. The character of Else signifies anger, the second stage in the grieving process.

Lise – a receptionist for the Global Hotel, Lise was responsible for inviting Else, the homeless woman, to spend a night there.

Penny Warner – A reporter and journalist, Penny is a paying guest to the Global Hotel, there to review its services.

Clare Wilby – the younger sister to Sara, Clare is not entirely introduced until the last section of the novel. Clare's character signifies the final stage in the grieving process, that of acceptance.

Duncan – He was the sole witness to Sara's death. As the novel's only dominant male character, Duncan appears in each story within the novel. He too is moved to an emotional state of depression after witnessing the tragedy. Including Duncan in each of the novel's stories, Smith seems to imply that these stages of grief may affect mere observers too, that these stages are not exclusive to family or close personal friends of those who have died.

== Allusions and references ==
Ali Smith includes several quotes and short poems at the start of the book which are reflective of the themes of the novel.

- Muriel Spark says “remember you must die” (in her 1959 novel Memento Mori) meaning people should appreciate life to its full potential because it will one day end. This quote ties into the theme about the passage of time, and is also reminiscent of Smith's recurrent “remember you must live.”
- William Blake describes “Energy” as being “eternal delight.” Ghosts are thought by some to be the body's energy which forever preserved, which means that a ghost, or any form of life after death, is thus viewed as eternally delightful because they will persist forever.
- Edwin Muir’s poem that speaks about the “unfriendly universe” also ties into the theme of the passage of time. It describes "the miracle” as being the point where people are able to let go.

Smith also makes reference to Todd Solondz's 1998 film Happiness, a controversial film which deals with sexuality and isolation and their difficult relationship to each other.

== Awards and nominations ==
- Shortlisted for the Booker Prize for Fiction 2001
- Shortlisted for the Orange Prize for Fiction 2001
- Received the Scottish Arts Council Book Award – Fiction 2001
- Received the Scottish Arts Council Book Award – Book of the Year 2001
- Received the Encore Award 2002

== Adaptations ==
The book has been adapted to the stage by Kidbrooke secondary school and performed at Greenwich Theatre and the 2007 Edinburgh Festival Fringe.
