= Like (novel) =

1997 by Scottish author Ali Smith

- First edition with quote from Kate Atkinson
- Author: Ali Smith
- Language: English
- Publisher: Virago (UK); Houghton Mifflin Harcourt (US)
- Publication date: 1997 (UK), 1998 (US)
- Publication place: United Kingdom
- Media type: Print
- Pages: 352
- ISBN: 1-86049-262-2

Like is the debut novel by Scottish author Ali Smith, first published in 1997 in the UK by Virago and in the following year in the US by Houghton Mifflin Harcourt, it draws much from Ali Smith's own life growing up in Inverness and then moving to Cambridge as a student.

== Plot introduction ==
The novel is told in two parts: the first is set in present-day Scotland where Amy Shone, a seemingly itinerant and illiterate drifter has just found work as the caretaker of a caravan site and camping ground. She lives with her nearly eight-year-old daughter, Kate, and their patchwork lives are thrown into relief with glimpses of Amy's more glamorous past, when she was a Cambridge scholar.

When a random phone call for an interview brings mention of her one-time friendship with a young actress named Aisling (Ash) McCarthy, the mysteries of Amy's unraveled life begin to settle.

The second half of the book is a journal, written by Amy's old friend and actress, Aisling McCarthy, found in a box of Amy's old journals that her daughter Kate has read. Ash's journal is a headlong rush through her relationship with Amy from its dizzy beginning to its fiery end. Ash's journal highlights a tale of opposites - with twin desires as well as a subtle metaphor of Scotland and England themselves: two countries forever connected and forever apart.

== Reception ==
- 'Beautifully written in precise, poetic prose' - The Observer
- "Ingenious, shimmering fiction, written with a poetic grace that subtly illuminates the tensions between hope and desire, between past and present" — Scotland on Sunday
