= Gliff =

2024 Ali Smith novel

- Author: Ali Smith
- Publisher: Hamish Hamilton
- Publication date: 31 October 2024
- Pages: 274
- ISBN: 978-0-241-66557-2
- Followed by: Glyph

Gliff is a 2024 dystopian novel by Scottish author Ali Smith. It was shortlisted for the 2024 Highland Book Prize. The follow-up, Glyph, was published in 2026.

== Publication ==
The novel began as a short story written in August 2023; an anthology commission to write something "tangentially Kafkaesque".Gliff was published by Hamish Hamilton on 31 October 2024 in the UK, and on 4 February 2025 by Pantheon in the US.

Glyph, a standalone novel which "tell[s] a story hidden in [Gliff]" was published in 2026.

== Critical reception ==
Gliff was largely received positively by critics. In her review for The Guardian, Paraic O’Donnell praised Smith's "sportive wordplay", and Hamilton Cain of The Washington Post called the book a "tricksy masterwork". Writing for The New York Times, A.O. Scott commended Smith's prose, although noted that Gliff wasn't as "ablaze with formal daring" as her previous works. In his review for The Times, John Self criticised the novel's binary view of morality and lack of complex antagonists. Francesca Peacock of The Spectator, whilst applauding Smith's "characteristic linguistic experimentation", felt the novel had some serious issues, including the unexplained time skips and unrealised emotional pull.

The novel was shortlisted for the 2024 Highland Book Prize, the 2025 Gordon Bowker Volcano Prize and won the 2026 Dublin Literary Award.
