= Tope Folarin =

Nigerian-American writer

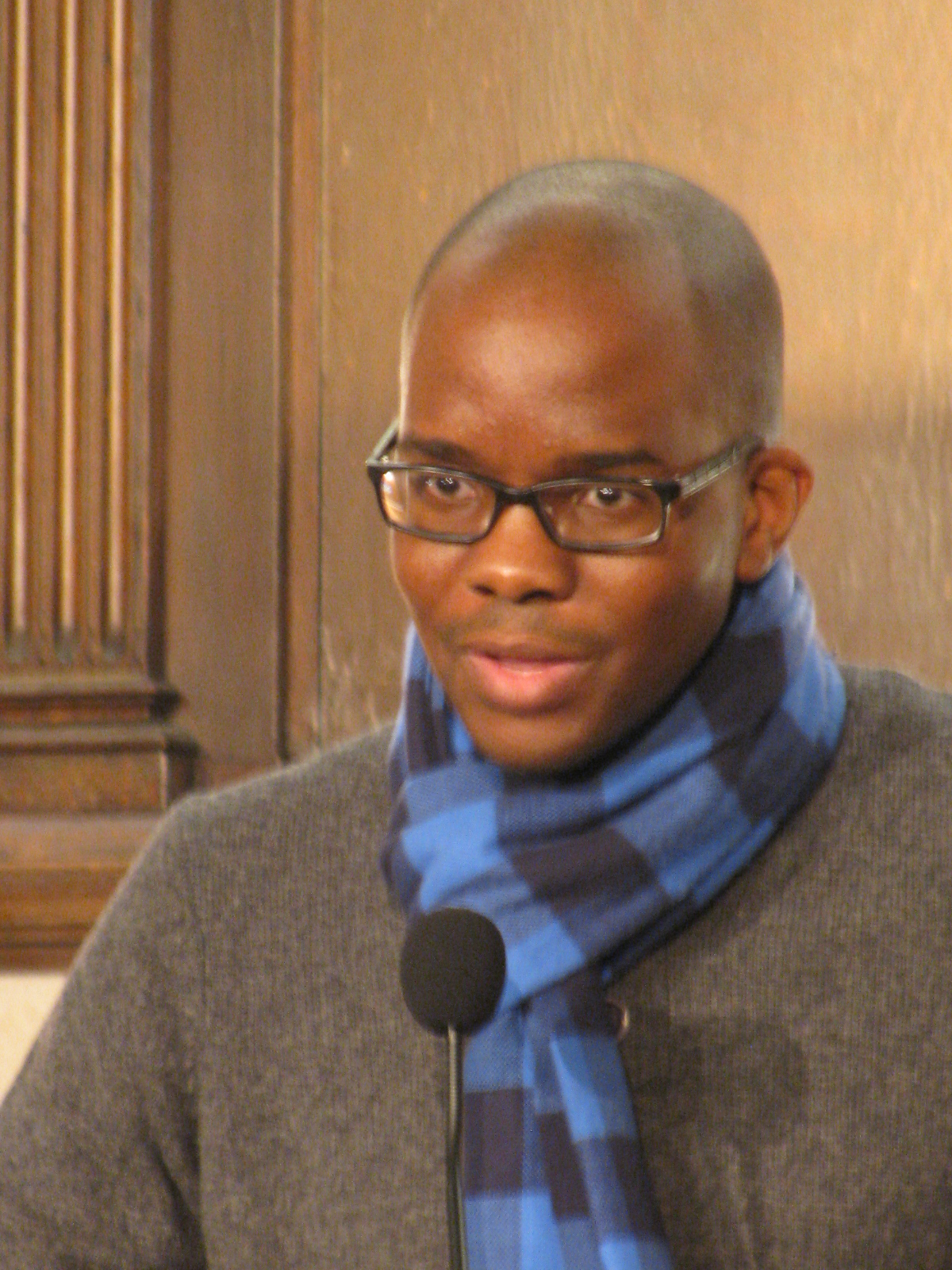
- Born: Oluwabusayo Temitope Folarin; 1981 (age 44–45); Ogden, Utah, U.S.
- Education: Morehouse College (BA); Harris Manchester College, Oxford (MSc)
- Awards: Caine Prize (2013); Whiting Award for Fiction (2021)
- Website: Official website

Tope Folarin (born 1981) is a Nigerian-American writer and executive director of the Institute for Policy Studies. He won the 2013 Caine Prize for African Writing for his short story "Miracle". In April 2014 he was named in the Hay Festival's Africa39 project as one of the 39 Sub-Saharan African writers aged under 40 with the potential and talent to define the trends of the region. His story "Genesis" was shortlisted for the 2016 Caine Prize.

== Early life ==
He was born as Oluwabusayo Temitope Folarin in Ogden, Utah, to Nigerian immigrants, and has four younger siblings — three brothers and a sister, all born in the United States. He grew up in Grand Prairie, Texas, where he moved with his family at the age of 14.

Speaking of his upbringing in a 2016 interview, Folarin said that he and his siblings were raised with "a deep respect" for Nigeria and Africa. The children were eager to visit Nigeria, but financial constraints prevented the family from doing so. "I think my writing reflects both of these aspects of my life—a sense of closeness to Nigeria, and a distance as well," he said.

After high school he enrolled at Morehouse College. He studied for a year and a half as an exchange student, first at Bates College in Maine, then at the University of Cape Town in South Africa, before returning to the US and graduating from Morehouse in 2004, with a B.A. He was named a 2004 Rhodes Scholar, and during the summer of 2004 was a Galbraith Scholar at Harvard University's Kennedy School of Government. After that, he went to England to study at the University of Oxford, where he was a member of Harris Manchester College, graduating in 2006 with an M.Sc. in African Studies and an M.Sc. in Comparative Social Policy.

== Career ==
In 2013 Folarin became the first writer based outside Africa to win the Caine Prize, which he won for his short story "Miracle." The story is set in Texas in an evangelical Nigerian church. The award of the prize — which is open to anyone who was born in Africa, is an African national, or whose parents are African — generated some discussion about whether the author's connection to Africa was strong enough.

Tope said in an interview to The Guardian:

"I'm a writer situated in the Nigerian disapora, and the Caine Prize means a lot – it feels like I'm connected to a long tradition of African writers. The Caine Prize is broadening its definition and scope. I consider myself Nigerian and American, both identities are integral to who I am. To win … feels like a seal of approval."

In April 2014 he was named on the Hay Festival's Africa39 list of writers aged under 40 with the potential and talent to define trends in African literature.

He has served on the board of the Hurston/Wright Foundation in the United States.

His first novel, A Particular Kind of Black Man, was published by Simon & Schuster in August 2019. In it Folarin writes about a Nigerian family, new to America, as they try to assimilate. In 2021, Folarin won the Whiting Award for Fiction.

In 2021, he was named as Executive Director of the Institute for Policy Studies, a progressive think tank based in Washington, D.C., where he previously served as Board Chair.

== Personal life ==
Folarin lives in Washington, D.C.

== Publications ==
=== Novel ===
- A Particular Kind of Black Man, Simon & Schuster, 2019 ISBN 9781501171819

=== Short stories ===
- "Miracle," Transition, No. 109, Persona (2012), pp. 73–83
- "The Summer of Ice Cream", Virginia Quarterly Review, Fall 2014, Vol. 90, No. 4, pp. 54+
- "New Mom, from a novel in progress," Africa39: New Writing from Africa South of the Sahara, Bloomsbury Publishing, October 2014.
- Folarin, Tope (2014). "Genesis". Callaloo. 37 (5): 1070–1082. doi:10.1353/cal.2014.0198. S2CID 246284522. Project MUSE 565044.
