= Ali Smith =

Scottish author and journalist (born 1962)

Ali Smith CBE FRSL
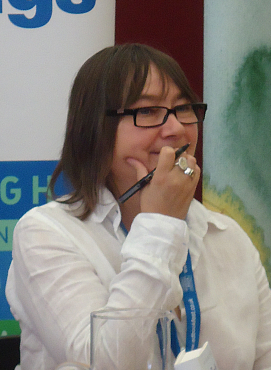
- Smith signing books at Edinburgh International Book Festival
- Born: 24 August 1962 (age 64); Inverness, Scotland
- Education: University of Aberdeen; Newnham College, Cambridge
- Occupations: Author, playwright, academic, journalist
- Partner: Sarah Wood
- Writing career
- Period: 1986–present

Ali Smith CBE FRSL (born 24 August 1962) is a Scottish author, playwright, academic and journalist. Sebastian Barry described her in 2016 as "Scotland's Nobel laureate-in-waiting." Smith released two, homophone novels in successive years, Gliff in 2024 followed by Glyph in 2026, which deal with contemporary social dilemmas and political topics.

== Early life and education ==
Smith was born in Inverness on 24 August 1962 to Ann and Donald Smith. Her parents were working-class and she was raised in a council house in Inverness. From 1967 to 1974 she attended St. Joseph's RC Primary School, then went to Inverness High School, leaving in 1980.

She pursued a joint degree in English language and literature at the University of Aberdeen from 1980 to 1985, coming first in her class in 1982 and gaining a top first in Senior Honours English in 1984. She won the university's Bobby Aitken Memorial Prize for Poetry in 1984.

From 1985 to 1990 she attended Newnham College, Cambridge, studying for a PhD in American and Irish modernism. During her time at Cambridge, she began writing plays and as a result, did not complete her doctorate.

Smith moved to Edinburgh from Cambridge in 1990 and worked as a lecturer in Scottish, English and American literature at the University of Strathclyde. She left the university in 1992 because she was suffering from chronic fatigue syndrome. She returned to Cambridge to recuperate.

As a young woman, Smith held several part-time jobs including waitress, lettuce-cleaner, tourist board assistant, receptionist at BBC Highland and advertising copywriter.

== Career ==
While studying for a PhD at Cambridge, Smith wrote several plays which were staged at the Edinburgh Festival Fringe and Cambridge Footlights. After some time working in Scotland, she returned to Cambridge to concentrate on her writing, focussing on short stories and freelancing as the fiction reviewer for The Scotsman. In 1995, she published her first book, Free Love and Other Stories, a collection of 12 short stories which won the Saltire First Book of the Year award and Scottish Arts Council Book Award.

She writes articles for The Guardian, The Scotsman, New Statesman and The Times Literary Supplement.

Smith partnered with the Scottish band Trashcan Sinatras and wrote the lyrics to a song called "Half An Apple", a love song about keeping half an apple spare for a loved one who is gone. The song was released on 5 March 2007, on the album Ballads of the Book.

In 2008, Smith produced The Book Lover, a collection of her favourite writing, including pieces from Sylvia Plath, Muriel Spark, Grace Paley, Margaret Atwood, Joseph Roth and Clarice Lispector. Smith contributed the short story "Writ" to an anthology supporting Save the Children. The anthology is entitled The Children's Hours and was published by Arcadia Books. Foreign editions have been published in Portugal, Italy, China and Korea.

In 2009, she donated the short story "Last" (previously published in the Manchester Review online) to Oxfam's Ox-Tales project, four collections of UK stories written by 38 authors. Her story was published in the Fire collection.

In 2011 she wrote a short memoir for The Observer in their "Once upon a life" series. In October of that year, Smith published The Story of Antigone, a retelling of the classic by Sophocles. It is part of the "Save the stories" series by Pushkin Children's Books and is illustrated by Laura Paoletti.

In October 2012, Smith read a sermon at Manchester Cathedral to guests and students, followed by a book signing.

In 2013, Smith published Artful, a book based on her lectures on European comparative literature delivered the previous year at St Anne's College, Oxford. Artful was well-received, with one reviewer commenting that "...her new book, in which she tugs at God’s sleeve, ruminates on clowns, shoplifts used books, dabbles in Greek and palavers with the dead, is a stunner." On 14 May 2013, Smith gave the National Centre for Writing's inaugural Harriet Martineau lecture, in celebration of Norwich, UNESCO's 2012 City of Literature.

Smith is also a patron of the Visual Verse online anthology. Her piece "Untitled", written in response to an image by artist Rupert Jessop, appears in the November 2014 edition.

In 2011, she contributed the short story "Scots Pine (A Valediction Forbidding Mourning)" to Why Willows Weep, an anthology supporting The Woodland Trust. The paperback edition was released in 2016. Smith is also patron of Refugee Tales. In 2016, Smith's story "The Detainee's Tale" was published by Comma Press in Refugee Tales Volume 1.

In May 2021, Smith contributed a short story entitled "The final frontier" to The European Review of Books.

== Personal life ==
Smith lives in Cambridge with her partner, filmmaker Sarah Wood.

== Awards and honours ==
In 2007, Smith was elected a fellow of the Royal Society of Literature.

She was appointed Commander of the Order of the British Empire (CBE) in the 2015 New Year Honours for services to literature.

On 10 September 2015, Smith was named Honorary Fellow by Goldsmiths, University of London. In 2016, Smith was awarded an honorary doctorate from the University of East Anglia. An honorary doctorate was awarded to her by Newcastle University in 2019.

In 2024, she was awarded the Bodley Medal for contributions to literature, the highest honour of the Bodleian Library, University of Oxford.

In May 2026, Smith won the International Dublin Literary Award for her novel Gliff.

=== Literary awards ===
Year published	Work	Award	Category	Result	Ref
2001	Hotel World	Booker Prize	Fiction	Shortlisted	
2001	Hotel World	Encore Award	—	Won	
2001	Hotel World	Scottish Arts Council Award	Book of the Year	Won	
2001	Hotel World	Scottish Arts Council Award	Fiction	Won	
2001	Hotel World	Orange Prize for Fiction	—	Shortlisted	
2005	The Accidental	Booker Prize	—	Shortlisted	
2005	The Accidental	Costa Book Awards	Novel	Won	
2005	The Accidental	Women's Prize for Fiction	—	Shortlisted	
2007	Girl Meets Boy	Diva magazine readers' choice	Book of the Year	Won	
2007	Girl Meets Boy	Sundial Scottish Arts Council	Novel of the Year	Won	
2012	There But For The	Hawthornden Prize	—	Won	
2012	There But For The	James Tait Black Memorial Prize	—	Shortlisted	
2012	There But For The	SMIT Book Awards	Fiction	Won	
2012	There But For The	Women's Prize for Fiction	—	Longlisted	
2013	Artful	Bristol Festival of Ideas Book Prize	—	Won	
2013	Artful	Goldsmiths Prize	—	Shortlisted	
2013	Artful	SMIT Book Awards	Fiction	Shortlisted	
2014	How to Be Both	Booker Prize	—	Shortlisted	
2014	How to Be Both	Costa Book Awards	Novel	Won	
2014	How to Be Both	Goldsmiths Prize	—	Won	
2015	How to Be Both	Folio Prize	—	Shortlisted	
2015	How to Be Both	Women's Prize for Fiction	—	Won	
2016	Autumn	Booker Prize	—	Shortlisted	
2019	Spring	Europese Literatuurprijs	—	Won	
2019	Spring	Highland Book Prize	—	Won	
2020	Summer	Orwell Prize	—	Won	
2020	Summer	Highland Book Prize	—	Shortlisted	
2022	Companion Piece	Highland Book Prize	—	Shortlisted	
2024	Gliff	Highland Book Prize	—	Shortlisted	

== Works ==
=== Novels ===
- Like (1997)
- Hotel World (2001)
- The Accidental (2005)
- Girl Meets Boy (2007)
- There But For The (2011)
- Artful (2012)
- How to Be Both (2014)
- Autumn (2016)
- Winter (2017)
- Spring (2019)
- Summer (2020)
- Companion Piece (2022)
- Gliff (2024)
- Glyph (2026)

=== Short story collections ===
- Free Love and Other Stories (1995), awarded the Saltire First Book of the Year award and Scottish Arts Council Book Award
- Other Stories and Other Stories (1999)
- The Whole Story and Other Stories (2003)
- The First Person and Other Stories (2008)
- Public Library and Other Stories (2015)

=== Plays ===
- Stalemate (1986), unpublished, produced at the Edinburgh Festival Fringe
- The Dance (1988), unpublished, produced at the Edinburgh Festival Fringe
- Trace of Arc (1989), produced at the Edinburgh Festival Fringe
- Daughters of England (1989–1990), unpublished, Cambridge Footlights
- Amazons (1990), Cambridge Footlights
- Comic (1990), unpublished, produced at the Edinburgh Festival Fringe
- The Seer (2001)
- Just (2005)

=== Other ===
- Shire (2013), with images by Sarah Wood, short stories and autobiographical writing, Full Circle Editions
