= A Particular Kind of Black Man =

2019 novel by Tope Folarin

- First edition (publ. Simon & Schuster)
- Author: Tope Folarin
- Language: English
- Subjects: Coming-of-age, Racism, Self-realization
- Genre: Literary fiction
- Publisher: Simon & Schuster
- Publication date: 2019
- Publication place: Nigeria
- Media type: Print (hardcover, paperback), e-book
- Pages: 272
- ISBN: 978-1-5011-7181-9

A Particular Kind of Black Man is a 2019 novel by Nigerian writer Tope Folarin.

== Plot ==
A Particular Kind of Black Man centers on the protagonist, Tunde Akinola, a Nigerian who lives in Utah with his family. While in school, Tunde has to face racism from his classmates and schoolmates who rub his skin asking why his dark skin will not go off. At home, Tunde's father, Akinola, struggles to keep up to his responsibility as he cannot get a good job due to his skin and race. His mother, who has schizophrenia, abuses Tunde physically. Tunde's mother wakes up one morning and takes Tunde and his younger brother and ran away. Akinola tracks them and takes Tunde, while Tunde's mother flies back to Nigeria with his younger brother. Tunde's father remarries a Utah resident who is also a racist and divorcee who prefers her own children over Tunde.

== Theme ==
The theme in the novel includes coming-of-age, racism and self-realization.

== Development ==
Folarin stated that the novel was supposed to be a semi-autobiography, but the story then began to expand and that the protagonist took a new phase rather than what he had imagined.

== Reception ==
Publishers Weekly described it as "[A] tender, cunning debut..." and that "Folarin pulls off the crafty trick of simultaneously bringing scenes to sharp life and undercutting their reliability, and evokes the complexities of life as a second-generation African-American in simple, vivid prose. Folarin's debut is canny and electrifying." The New York Times described it as "Wild, vulnerable, lived...A study of the particulate self, the self as a constellation of moving parts."
