= Paula Doepfner =

German artist

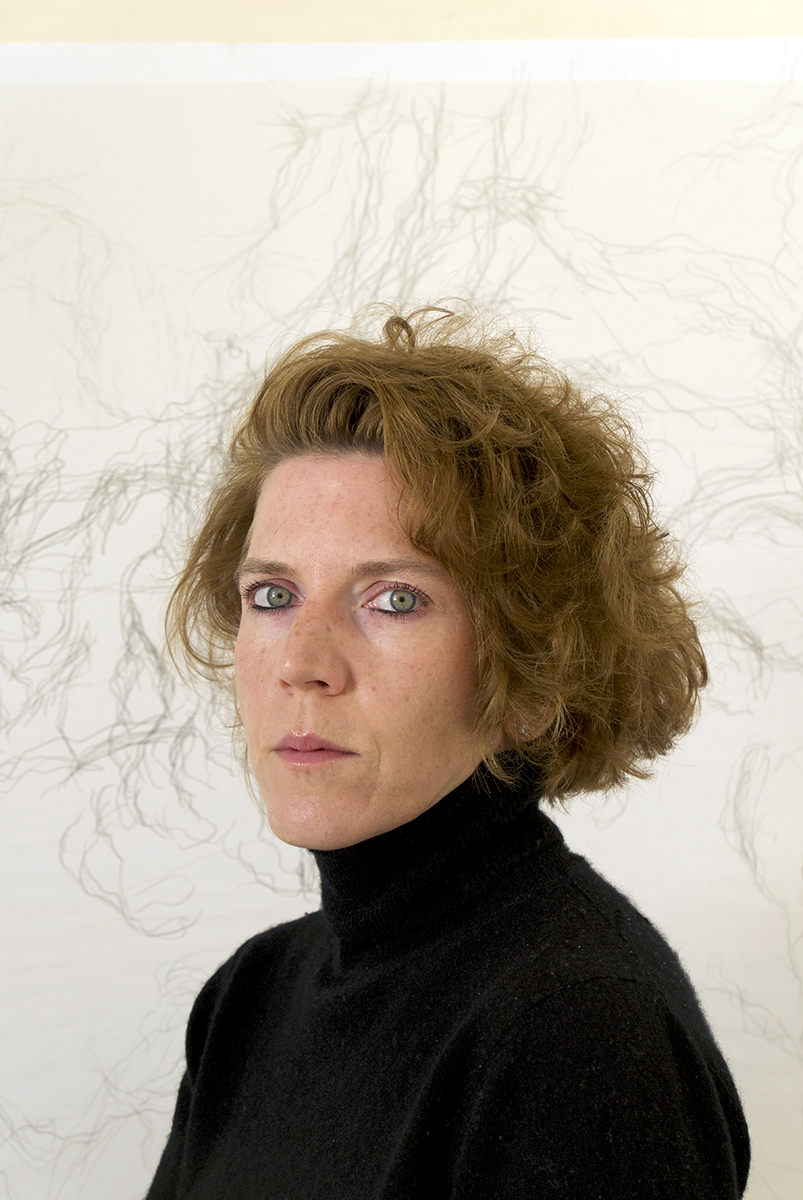
Paula Doepfner

Paula Doepfner (born in Berlin - July 1980) is a contemporary artist. Her work includes text-based drawings, performances, and objects made of ice, organic matter, and damaged armored glass. She lives and works in Berlin.

== Life ==
Paula Doepfner studied fine arts from 2002 to 2008, at the Universität der Künste Berlin and at the Chelsea College of Arts, University of the Arts London. She studied under Roger Ackling in London and graduated from the masterclass Rebecca Horn in Berlin. She has received numerous prizes and stipends, among others the Rome Prize Villa Massimo of the German Academy 2027/28, the Hans Platschek prize (2024), the Krull foundation work stipend (2023), the Konrad Adenauer Foundation EHF stipend (2021/22), the work stipend of the Albert Koechlin foundation, Lucerne (2010), and the Else Neumann stipend from the City of Berlin (2008).

Doepfner's work has been exhibited nationally and internationally, with institutional solo exhibitions at the Kupferstich-Kabinett Dresden (2023), the Akademie der Konrad-Adenauer-Stiftung (2022), and the Goethe-Institut, Washington, D.C. (2015). She has participated in group exhibitions at institutions including the Museum of Fine Arts Budapest (2025), Museum Würth 2 (2025), and the Berliner Medizinhistorisches Museum at the Charité (2023). Her works are held in public and private collections such as the Kupferstichkabinett Berlin, the Museum of Fine Arts Budapest, the Deutsche Nationalbibliothek Leipzig, and the Staatliche Kunstsammlungen Dresden.

== Work ==
Paula Doepfner's artistic practice comprises drawings, performances, and objects made of ice, glass, and organic matter. The content of her work is drawn from literary texts and documents relating to human rights abuses and the Holocaust. Her drawings consist of minute script on transparent paper; she writes lines of text in tiny letters (ø = 1 mm) to form textual images. The drawings are based on sketches she makes while observing autopsies and brain surgery at the Charité University Hospital Berlin. The strings of text in her drawings are taken from the Istanbul Protocol, a UN handbook on the investigation and documentation of torture and other cruel, inhumane, or degrading treatment, and from documentary material on the children of Auschwitz. Paula Doepfner combines these documentary texts with literary works by the likes of Anne Carson, Paul Celan, Joyce Mansour and Robert Musil.

For her glass works Paula Doepfner makes color sketches of regions of the brain, transferring them onto the glass, usually large pieces of glass, with pigment and varnish. She uses armored glass from commercial units and luxury buildings that have been damaged during demonstrations. Some of the glass works hang on the wall, others stand in space.

Paula Doepfner's ice blocks, which weigh up to 500 kg, either melt into metal trays in the gallery space before evaporating, or run off into the ground when exhibited in public space. Inside the blocks Doepfner freezes paper inscribed with texts. The inscribed pieces of paper are frozen into the center of the transparent ice blocks.

For her sound performances Doepfner works together with a musician, usually a double-bass player. The double-bass player plays just one note in microtonal intervals while Doepfner makes sounds with foliage and dried shrubbery.

Paula Doepfner's works “incorporate the passing of time and reveal internal organic structures. They are always based on human experience.” Her work deals with the “darkest aspects of human existence” and transforms them “into something almost material, physical, something that’s not just symbolic but also a remnant, a trace of something, of language, of life, even her own life. Neither imagery nor poetry, it’s something that has to be regarded forensically, as fact.”

== Solo exhibitions (selected) ==
- 2026: Solopresentation at UN Headquarters of Genvea, Switzerland
- 2026: „Out in front of a dozen dead oceans“, Zentrum für Kulturtechnik, Humboldt Universität Berlin, Germany
- 2025: "Desolation Row", Kunstverein Konstanz, Konstanz, Germany
- 2025: "I Heard the Sound of a Thunder, It Roared Out a Warnin’", Kunstforum of TU Darmstadt, Darmstadt, Germany
- 2023 "Darkness at the break of noon", Kupferstich-Kabinett, Staatliche Kunstsammlungen Dresden, Dresden, Germany
- 2022 "I went to the crossroads", Akademie der Konrad Adenauer Stiftung, Berlin, Germany
- 2021 "Today and tomorrow, and yesterday, too, the flowers are dyin' like all things do", Konrad Adenauer Stiftung, Berlin, Germany
- 2019 "For the trees to drop" Stiftung St. Matthäus, Berlin, Germany
- 2018 "Next Time I See You", Galleria Mario Iannelli, Rome, Italy
- 2017 "Babe, I’ve left you somewhere in the rain", Una Vetrina, Rome, Italy
- 2016 "Put it right here (or keep it out there)" Kunstverein Reutlingen, Germany
- 2015 "Take It Right Back" Goethe Institute, Washington, D.C.
- 2014 "Whatever gets you through the night, it's alright, it's alright", Galerie Tanja Wagner, Berlin
- 2014 "When Lilacs Last in the Dooryard Bloomed", Galerie Laurent Mueller, Paris
- 2013 "Rollin' High And Mighty Traps", S2A, New York; Performance with Steve Whipple
- 2012 "More than I can hide", Kunstverein Östliches Sauerland, Germany
- 2011 "But my nerves were kicking", Ionion Center for the Arts, Kefalonia
- 2011 "Mehr Zeit bedeutet nicht mehr Ewigkeit", Performance with Hakeem Holloway, Berlin Art Junction
- 2010 "Promessus", Galerie Tanja Wagner, Berlin
- 2010 "Fallen", Stadtmühle Willisau, Lucerne
- 2009 "Im Schlaf ohne Schlaf", St. Johannes Evangelist-Kirche, Berlin; Performance with Gregor Fuhrmann

=== Group exhibitions (selected) ===
- 2026: Fracture, Kunstpreis Haus am Kleistpark 2026, Haus am Kleistpark, Berlin, Germany
- 2025: Reminiscent Practices, Museum of Fine Arts Budapest, Budapest, Hungary
- 2025: FOCUS: New Perspectives on the Würth Collection, Museum Würth 2, Künzelsau, Germany
- 2023: Das Gehirn, Medizinhistorisches Museum der Charité, Berlin
- 2022: Strich um Strich. Zeichnen 2, Galerie ETAGE, Museum Reinickendorf, Berlin
- 2021: All I Think About Is You, Galerie Georg Nothelfer und Kunstsaele, Berlin
- 2021: Deceleration, Ausstellung zum Kunstpreis des Hauses am Kleistpark, Berlin
- 2020: Freitod – Exhibition on the 10th anniversary, Kunstsaele, Berlin
- 2020: Das Blatt, Curated Affairs und Kunstverein am Rosa-Luxemburg-Platz, Düsseldorf/ Berlin
- 2019: Der Funke Gottes, Diözesanmuseum Bamberg
- 2018: Abenteuer Freundschaft, Kunstsaele, Berlin
- 2018: Marianne-Werefkin-Preis 2018, Kommunale Galerie, Berlin
- 2017: Lost in Transition, Kunstforum der TU Darmstadt
- 2017: Berliini – Nastola, Taarasti Art Center, Nastola, Finland
- 2017: Ubi fracassorium, ibi fuggitorium, artQ13, Rom
- 2017: On botany, BLOK art space, Istanbul
- 2016: UM-Festival, Brandenburg
- 2015: #2, Kunstverein Reutlingen
- 2015: The vacancy, Temporäres Kunsthaus, Berlin
- 2014: Ease your window down, Kunstverein am Rosa-Luxemburg-Platz, Berlin
- 2013: Mono-no-aware, Linden Centre for Contemporary Art, Melbourne
- 2013: Real Naturally, Kunsthalle Lana, Meran
- 2012: Zeichnungen von Bildhauern, Kunstverein Mainz
- 2012: Plants Talk II, Kunstverein Potsdam
- 2012: Zeichnungen, Salon Dahlmann, Berlin
- 2011: Plants Talk, Naturkundliches Museum Witzenhausen
- 2011: Funkhaus Kunstpreis, Funkhaus, Berlin
- 2011: Kunstaktien in den Uferhallen, Berlin
- 2010: glauben, dass…, Shedhalle Tübingen
- 2010: Leben Lieben Leiden, Kunstverein Celle
- 2010: AKA Symbol, Forgotten Bar Project, Berlin
- 2010: Wrong Love, A Foundation, Liverpool
- 2009: Zeigen, eine Audiotour, Temporäre Kunsthalle, Berlin
- 2009: Access All Areas, Galerie Max Hetzler, Berlin
- 2008: Klasse Rebecca Horn, Schloß Liebenberg, Brandenburg
- 2008: Meisterschülerausstellung, Universität der Künste, Berlin
- 2005: Chelsea College Studentshow, London

== Scholarships and awards ==
- 2027/28 Rome Prize Villa Massimo of the German Academy
- 2024 "Hans Platschek Preis für Kunst und Schrift", awarded by Prof. Marion Ackermann
- 2023 Artist scholarship, Krull Foundation
- 2021/22 EHF Stipend, Konrad Adenauer Stiftung, Berlin, Germany
- 2015 Artist in residence, Goethe Institute, Washington, D.C., USA
- 2010 Work stipend, Albert Koechlin Foundation, Lucerne, Switzerland
- 2008/09 Stipend, Elsa-Neumann-Stipendium by City of Berlin, Germany

== Public collections ==
- Staatliche Kunsthalle Karlsruhe
- Kupferstichkabinett Berlin (SMB)
- Kupferstichkabinett Dresden (SKD)
- Konrad-Adenauer-Stiftung
- Deutsches Buch- und Schriftmuseum Leipzig
- Museum of Fine Arts, Budapest
- Würth Collection
