= The Accidental =

2005 novel by Ali Smith

- First edition cover
- Author: Ali Smith
- Language: English
- Genre: Postmodern fiction
- Publisher: Hamish Hamilton
- Publication date: 2005
- Media type: Print
- Pages: 320
- ISBN: 978-1-84505-824-1
- OCLC: 224398028
- Dewey Decimal: 823.92

The Accidental is a 2005 novel by Scottish author Ali Smith. It follows a middle-class English family who are visited by an uninvited guest, Amber, while they are on holiday in a small village in Norfolk. Amber's arrival has a profound effect on all the family members. Eventually she is cast out the house by the mother, Eve. But the consequences of her appearance continue even after the family has returned home to London.

The novel was received positively by critics. Jennifer Reese of the American magazine Entertainment Weekly praised the book, writing that "while The Accidental does not add up to much more than a clever stunt, Smith pulls it off with terrific pizzazz." The novel was shortlisted for the Orange Prize, the Man Booker Prize and James Tait Black Memorial Prize, and it won the Whitbread Award.

== Author ==
Ali Smith is a Scottish author, born in Inverness in 1962. She was a lecturer at the University of Strathclyde in Glasgow until she retired after contracting chronic fatigue syndrome, to concentrate on writing books. Smith's first book, Free Love and Other Stories, was published in 1995 and praised by critics; it was awarded the Saltire First Book of the Year award.

== Plot ==
Set in 2003, the novel consists of three parts: "The Beginning," "Middle" and "The End". Each part contains four separate narrations, one focusing on each member of the Smart family: Eve, the mother, Michael, her husband, Astrid (12) and Magnus (17), two children of Eve's from a previous marriage (to Adam Berenski). Opening and closing the novel, and between each part, we have four sections of first-person narration from 'Alhambra' – who we can assume is Amber, the Smarts' uninvited house-guest.

The novel opens with Alhambra telling us of her conception in 'the town's only cinema'. We then come to "The Beginning", which consists of a third-person narration focused first on Astrid, then Magnus, then Michael, then finally Eve. Through each character we obtain a different view of how Amber came into their lives, and who they believed her to be, when she arrived unannounced and uninvited at their Norfolk holiday home, claiming her car had broken down. Through "The Beginning", we learn of Astrid's obsession with video-taping her life, seemingly as proof it existed; of Magnus' involvement in a school prank which resulted in the suicide of one of his classmates; of Michael's affairs with his students (he is a university lecturer); and of Eve's writer's block.

The second first-person narration we have from Alhambra is altogether different from the first – here we are not offered her history, but rather a history of 20th century cinema – a past which she seems to adopt as her own, as if she were each of the characters in those films. "The Middle" deals, again, with each of the family members' experiences of Amber: she throws Astrid's camera off a bridge into the road, she seduces Magnus, and reveals flaws in Eve and Michael's relationship. "The Middle" ends with Eve throwing Amber out of their holiday home.

The third first-person narration from Alhambra follows, which is much the same as the second. We then have "The End", which takes us to the Smart home once they return from holiday. The house has been emptied of all possessions – we must assume, as the family do, by Amber – leaving nothing but the answering machine, which contains messages forcing Magnus, Michael and Eve to face up to their past. Magnus and Astrid seem freed and excited by the experience of losing their possessions, their past – Michael also seems to find some redemption. Eve, however, runs away from the family, embarking on a round-the-world tour – eventually ending up in America, where she goes in search of her old family home. "The End" ends, ominously, with Eve seeming to take up Amber's mantle, arriving at someone's house as an uninvited guest. The book then finishes with a short section from Alhambra, reinforcing her connection to the cinema.

== Style ==
Critics have noted the ways in which this is a postmodern novel that "raises questions about the nature of representation". Richard Bradford, for instance, plays particular attention to Smith's use of language and the disparate discourses voiced by distinct characters. Eventually, as he points out, "the relatively secure borders between each character's third-person space begin to break down with voices echoing in and out of each other". As a challenge to the realism of traditional Scottish fiction, "at one point the book itself appears in danger of fragmenting, as words and letters collapse out of regular typeface and collapse across the page."

The critic John Sutherland also comments on the novel's "remarkable narrative obliquity". He notes also the intertextual and "intergeneric" nature of the book, the way in which it references the Italian director Pier Paolo Pasolini's 1968 film Teorema in which, likewise, "a mysterious, beautiful stranger [...] arrives from nowhere into a family and, simply by virtue of what he is, destroys their merely 'theoretic' coherence". Sutherland also stresses the ways in which Amber is "the offspring of cinema".

== Reception ==
Gail Caldwell of The Boston Globe called it a "thoroughly charming and melodic novel," adding that it was "small and glistening, one confident little shooting star instead of a cumbersome light show." American magazine The Atlantic Monthly praised the book, writing that "[the book] is an enormous technical accomplishment that reminds us of the difference between linguistic hocus-pocus and real writing; more important, it casts a spell." Adam Begley of The New York Observer called it "A delightful book," adding that it is "a satire that's playful but not cuddly, tart but not bitter, thoughtful but not heavy." Publishers Weekly commented "so sure-handed are Smith's overlapping descriptions of the same events from different viewpoints that her simple, disquieting story lifts into brilliance." Michael Schaub of San Francisco Chronicle wrote "as dark as the novel can be, there are genuinely funny moments as well," adding that "the last sentence of the book manages to be enlightening, confusing and almost destructive in its simple power." The Times Literary Supplement wrote that the book is "original, restless, formally and morally challenging."

Jeff Turrentine of The Washington Post praised the book, writing "though The Accidental is not a conventionally funny novel, readers may find themselves laughing – in surprise and delight – at the way Smith takes a literary trope and riffs on it until she's turned it inside out, the way a great jazz musician might." Noel Murray of The A.V. Club praised the book, commenting that "though The Accidental is more spectacularly messy than brilliant, it has a strong perspective on what it means to be alive in the early '00s, and constantly tugged at by the disturbingly similar feelings of guilt and self-righteousness." In a positive review by The Guardian, Steven Poole notes that "The Accidental has an infectious sense of fun and invention. The story goes through some surprising reversals and arrives at a satisfying conclusion, which is also a beginning." A review in Kirkus Reviews declared of Smith's book that "Dazzling wordplay and abundant imagination invigorate a tale of lives interrupted." The Christian Science Monitor wrote "the writing brims with wit, humor, and energy." In a mixed review by 'Bookslut,' Eoin Cunningham wrote "The Accidental ends up more an exercise in cleverness than a story. Equally, the reader's enjoyment of The Accidental will be inextricably linked to their appetite for such an exercise. If you aren't swept away by Smith's undoubted way with words, and you rely on the bones of the story itself, you will be disappointed."

The novel was chosen as the winner of the Second Annual Tournament of Books, presented by The Morning News in 2006.
