= There But For The =

2011 novel by Ali Smith

- First edition
- Author: Ali Smith
- Cover artist: Rachel Whiteread
- Language: English
- Publisher: Hamish Hamilton (UK); Pantheon (US)
- Publication date: June 2011 (UK); Sep 2011 (US)
- Publication place: United Kingdom
- Media type: Print
- Pages: 357
- ISBN: 978-0375424090

There But For The is a 2011 novel by Scottish author Ali Smith, first published in the UK by Hamish Hamilton and in the US by Pantheon, and set in 2009 and 2010 in Greenwich, London. It was cited by both The Guardian book review and the Publishers Weekly as one of the best books of the year. and was also longlisted for the 2012 Orange Prize for Fiction.

== Plot introduction ==
The story revolves around Miles Garth, an 'ethical consultant' who attends an ‘annual alternative dinner party’ at an upper-middle class household in Greenwich. After the main course Miles goes upstairs, locks himself in the spare bedroom and refuses to leave indefinitely. Eventually becoming a minor celebrity when crowds gather outside the window, Miles highlights the effects of a consumerist and celebrity-based culture as various attempts are made to capitalise on his presence within the room. The name 'Miles' is replaced by 'Milo' as Garth is henceforth positioned as some form of new spiritual leader for the 'disenfranchised'.

The book is divided into four main narrative parts:

- There : Tells of Anna Hardie, a recently unemployed Scottish woman who has quit her job working with asylum seekers, of whom she 'had to make not matter so much'. The hosts of the party (Gen and Eric Lee) find her name and address in Garth's wallet and contact her in the hope that she can persuade Miles to leave. Anna recalls her contact with Miles when in 1980 as a 17-year-old she and Miles travelled together on a coach tour of Europe as winners in a short-story competition.
- But : In which Mark, a gay photo-researcher who invited Miles to the party mourns an old lover and hears his dead mother speaking to him in rhymes.
- For : Is set in the head of May Young, an elderly lady in a care home suffering from dementia, who has annual contact with Miles on the date of her daughter (and Miles' girlfriend) Jennifer's death.
- The : Revolves around Brooke, the daughter of two post-graduate researchers who, like Miles, attends the Lees' infamous dinner party as an unexpected guest. At the novel's close Brooke finds the door of the spare room unlocked and goes inside to chat to Miles. Brooke asks Miles to write her a story in which his younger self and older self meet. She asks him 'what story would you tell your self and what story would your self tell you?' Miles' completed short story is positioned at the very beginning of Smith's novel.
