= Artful (novel) =

2012 novel by Ali Smith

- First edition
- Author: Ali Smith
- Language: English
- Publisher: Hamish Hamilton
- ISBN: 9780241145401

Artful is a 2012 novel by Scottish author Ali Smith and published by Hamish Hamilton. It was shortlisted for the inaugural Goldsmiths Prize in 2013.

== Plot ==
This book is based on four lectures given by Ali Smith at Oxford University, the Weidenfeld lectures on European comparative literature. The four headings are: "On Time", "On Form", "On Edge", and "On Offer and On Reflection".

It has two fictional characters. One is a woman mourning her dead lover and the other is her dead lover who still seems to be present. She speaks to the mourning woman in Greek, steals belongings, and causes a nuisance. The dead woman was working on some lectures when she died, and the living one works with trees.

The English author and critic Julie Myerson wrote in the Guardian that "if this book has a central subject, it's the relationship between thought and art".

Smith explores different artists throughout the book including the surrealists, William Shakespeare, and Jackie Kay.

== Reception ==
The Independent called the novel "smart, allusive, informal, playful, and audacious".

Julie Myerson in The Guardian said the novel is "a seductive and compelling case for the power of imagination. Or – to go back to Dickens – a gorgeous and artfully dodging work of "shifting possibility". Or, in the words of Katherine Mansfield who, on finishing DH Lawrence's Aaron's Rod, compared it to a tree "firmly planted, deep thrusting, outspread, growing grandly, alive in every twig. All the time I read this book I felt it was feeding me." Back to trees, then, a perfect leitmotif for the unstoppable nourishment of literature. And there is food and substance in this wonderful, deeply original book."

Leah Hager Cohen in The New York Times said "A wordsmith to the very smithy of her soul, she is at once deeply playful and deeply serious. And her new book, in which she tugs at God’s sleeve, ruminates on clowns, shoplifts used books, dabbles in Greek and palavers with the dead, is a stunner."
