= The European Review of Books =

Literary magazine

- Editor: George Blaustein, Sander Pleij, Wiegertje Postma
- Categories: literature, culture, art
- Founded: 2021
- First issue: June 2022
- Based in: Maastricht, Amsterdam
- Language: multilingual
- Website: europeanreviewofbooks.com
- ISSN: 2773-1588

The European Review of Books is a cultural and literary magazine, featuring essays, fiction and poetry. The magazine is published in print and online, and it contains articles written in English language and in a writer's own tongue.

== History ==
In May 2021 the founders launched a crowdfunding campaign to raise the first resources which would bring the magazine to life. The first issue was released in June 2022.
