= Shukri Mabkhout =

Tunisian writer, academic and literary critic (born 1962)

- Born: 1962 (age 63–64); Tunisia
- Occupation: Novelist
- Writing career
- Notable work: The Italian
- Notable awards: International Prize for Arabic Fiction (2015)

Shukri Mabkhout, also transcribed Choukri Mabkhout, (Arabic: شكري المبخوت, romanized: Shukrī al-Mabkhūt; born 1962) is a Tunisian academic, critic and novelist. His 2014 debut novel, al-Talyānī (The Italian), won the International Prize for Arabic Fiction (the "Arab Booker") and has been translated into English and Italian.

== Biography ==
He was born in Tunis, and obtained a PhD in literature from the Manouba University. He has written several works of literary criticism and sits on the board of several literary journals.

Professor at the University of Tunis, he was Dean of the Faculty of Arts, Arts and Humanities of La Manouba before becoming president of Manouba University (2011-2017).

Director of the 33rd and the 34rd edition of the Tunis International Book Fair, he is also a member of the editorial board of several refereed journals, including Ibla magazine (published by the Institute of Arabic Literature in Tunis) and Romano Arabica (published by The Centre for Arab Studies in Bucharest).

In 2016, he was appointed by the President of the Republic of Tunisia as a member of the Higher Committee for Human Rights and Fundamental Freedoms.

== al-Talyānī (The Italian) ==
Shukri Mabkhout was propelled onto the international scene by his first novel al-Talyānī (The Italian), published in 2014. The plot follows a man, Abdel Nasser (nicknamed "The Italian") who inexplicably attacks the imam neighborhood imam during his father's funeral. The events of the novel unfold in Tunisia during the tumultuous late 1980s and early 1990s, and examine the political clashes between leftists and Islamists and the forces that brought Zine el-Abidine Ben Ali to power. The novel won the prestigious International Prize for Arabic Fiction (often called the "Arab Booker prize"), which was awarded in Abu Dhabi despite the book being banned in the Emirates.

Al-Talyānī was translated into English by Karen McNeil and Miled Faiza and was published as The Italian by Europa Editions in October 2021. It was also translated into Italian by Barbara Teresi and published as L’Italiano by Europa Editions in 2017.

== Honors and awards ==
- (1994) Tunisian National Book Award
- (2012) King Abdullah Bin Abdulaziz International Award for Translation
- (2015) International Prize for Arabic Fiction
- (2015) Tunisian Cultural Prize (2015)
- (2015) COMAR d'Or Prize
- (2016) Commander of the Tunisian Order of Merit
- (2018) King Faisal International Prize in Arabic Language and Literature
- Abdul Hameed Shoman Arab Researchers Award

== Publications ==
=== Fiction ===
- (2014) al-Talyānī (الطلياني); English translation: The Italian
- (2015) al-Sayyida al-raʾīsah (السيدة الرئيسة (Madame President)
- (2016) Bāghandā (باغندا)

=== Academic Books ===
- (in Arabic) The biography in the book of al-Ayyâm of Tâhâ Husayn, Tunis, Sud Published, 1992
- (in Arabic) Aesthetics: The text and its readers in classical Arabic poetics, Carthage, Tunisian Academy of Sciences, Letters, and Arts, 1993
- (in Arabic) The construction of negation, Tunis, University Publishing Center, 2006
- (in Arabic) The Inductive reasoning, Tunis, Publications of the faculty of letters of La Manouba, 2007
- (in Arabic) The assigned meaning, Tunis, Dar Maraya al hadatha, 2008
- (in Arabic) Theorization of linguistic issues, Tunis, Masciliana Publishing, 2008
- (in Arabic) Encyclopedic Dictionary of Pragmatics, Beirut, Dar Kitab al jadeed, 2010
- (in Arabic) Studies dealing with autobiography in Arabic literature, Tunis, Masciliana Publishing, 2017
- (in Arabic) The history of the atonement in Tunisia, Tunis, Masciliana Publishing, 2018
