= Autumn (novel) =

Book by Ali Smith

- Author: Ali Smith
- Cover artist: David Hockney "Early November Tunnel", 2006
- Language: English
- Publisher: Hamish Hamilton
- Publication date: 20 October 2016
- Publication place: United Kingdom
- Media type: Print
- Pages: 272
- ISBN: 978-0241207000
- Followed by: Winter

Autumn is a 2016 novel by Scottish author Ali Smith, first published by Hamish Hamilton. It is the first of four seasonal ‘state of the nation’ works. Written rapidly after the United Kingdom's 2016 European Union membership referendum, it was widely regarded as the first 'post-Brexit novel' dealing with the issues raised by the voters' decision. In July 2017, Autumn was longlisted for the 2017 Man Booker Prize for Fiction and in September 2017 it was announced as one of six books to make the shortlist. Many newspapers viewed it as the most likely candidate for winning; it was beaten by George Saunders' Lincoln in the Bardo.

The book was named by The New York Times as one of the 10 Best Books of 2017.

== Plot ==
Daniel Gluck, a 101-year-old former songwriter, lies asleep and dreaming in his care home. He is regularly visited by 32-year-old Elisabeth Demand, who had been his next door neighbour as a young child. Her mother had disapproved of their early friendship, due to the fact that Daniel was 85 and Elisabeth was 13 at the time, but Elisabeth had nevertheless formed a close bond with him and has been inspired by his descriptions of works of art. As a consequence of his influence on her, Elisabeth is now a junior art history lecturer at a London university. A major character in the novel is the long-dead '60s pop artist, Pauline Boty, the subject of Elisabeth's graduate school thesis. The story largely alternates between Daniel's prolonged dreams as he edges closer to death, and Elisabeth's recollections of the origins of their friendship and its repercussions.

== Publication ==
Autumn was published on 20 October 2016, less than four months after the UK's European Union membership referendum. Talking about the work's origins, and its three projected sequels, Smith said:

I've been thinking about writing a seasonal series of books for about 20 years now, and in 2014, after finishing How to Be Both, I realised it was time to start. This might simply be because I knew now it was possible, after Hamish Hamilton made such a beautiful finished book-form for How to be Both in a matter of weeks (!), to turn a book around quite speedily compared to the usual time it takes, and this excited me about how closely to contemporaneousness a finished book might be able to be in the world, and yet how it could also be, all through, very much about stratified, cyclic time.

== Critical reception ==
Writing in The Guardian, Joanna Kavenna wrote, "I think Smith is writing about finitude, and how life is fleeting, extraordinary and improbable, and yet unique mortals are trammelled by external edicts, forced to spend their time earning minimal wages, measuring passport photographs with a ruler. In her memory-scapes and dreamworlds, Smith reveals the buried longings of her characters; their agony, their hopeful eagerness, their fear of death. […] Autumn is a beautiful, poignant symphony of memories, dreams and transient realities; the 'endless sad fragility' of mortal lives."

The Scotsman's Stuart Kelly judged that, "In a way, AL Kennedy’s Serious Sweet has a better claim to be the first post-Brexit novel, despite being published before the vote, in that it diagnoses with tender anger and furious empathy the state leading up to the referendum. Kennedy channels a kind of regretful, anxious bruxism; Smith presents a bewildered, open-jawed aghast." He went on to find "echoes of [Smith's] previous work: some of the most beautiful parts of the novel are Daniel’s fitful dreams on the edge of death, which are reminiscent of the Sara Wilby sections of Hotel World; Elisabeth is a cynical naif or naïve cynic like Amber in The Accidental, whose outspokenness reveals the absurdity and hypocrisy of the world (the sections where she deals with the bureaucracy of getting a new passport are amongst the funniest things Smith has written)", before adding: "This is not to in any way suggest self-plagiarism: Smith is original even when revisiting tropes she has used beforehand." Kelly concluded, "Smith straddles the elegiac and the celebratory throughout this glorious novel. It manages to be both pertinent and perpetual […] Roll on Winter."

In The Independent, Lucy Scholes decided that, "Already acknowledged as one of the most inventive novelists writing in Britain today, with her new novel, Autumn, Ali Smith also proves herself to be one of the country’s foremost chroniclers, her finger firmly on the social and political pulse."

In the Financial Times, Alex Preston wrote: "The first of a quartet of season-themed novels, it begins with the Brexit vote and spools forwards in time (and backwards, and sideways, as is Smith's wont) towards November 2016. I looked up at one point when I was reading, and realised that the time of the novel had just overtaken real-world time. It’s a brilliant and unsettling conceit, leaving you marvelling that writing this good could have come so fast." He acknowledged that, "Autumn is a novel of ideas, and plot isn’t the reason we keep turning the pages. What grips the reader is the way that Smith draws us deeper into Elisabeth’s world […] and the way the amiable, big-hearted Daniel triangulates and illuminates these lives." Preston concluded by saying, "I can think of few writers — Virginia Woolf is one, James Salter another — so able to propel a narrative through voice alone. Smith’s use of free indirect discourse, the close-third-person style that puts the reader at once within and without her characters, means that Autumn, for all its braininess, is never difficult. […] This is a novel that works by accretion, appearing light and playful, surface-dwelling, while all the time enacting profound changes on the reader’s heart. In a country apparently divided against itself, a writer such as Smith, who makes you feel known, who seems to speak to your own private weirdnesses, is more valuable than a whole parliament of politicians."

The book was named by The New York Times as one of the 10 Best Books of 2017. In 2019, the novel was ranked 8th on The Guardian's list of the 100 best books of the 21st century.
