= Spring (novel) =

2019 novel by Ali Smith

- First edition UK hardcover
- Author: Ali Smith
- Audio read by: Juliette Burton
- Cover artist: David Hockney; Late Spring Tunnel (2016)
- Language: English
- Series: Seasonal Quartet
- Publisher: Hamish Hamilton (UK), Pantheon Books (US)
- Publication date: 28 March 2019
- Publication place: United Kingdom
- Media type: Print, ebook, audiobook
- Pages: 352 pp
- ISBN: 9780241207048 (1st ed UK hardcover)
- OCLC: 1039630979
- Dewey Decimal: 823/.914
- LC Class: PR6069.M4213 S67 2019
- Preceded by: Winter
- Followed by: Summer

Spring is a 2019 novel by Scottish author Ali Smith, first published by Hamish Hamilton. It was longlisted for the Orwell Prize (2020).

== Plot ==
Each novel in Smith's seasonal series is juxtaposed with a work of Shakespeare – in this one, it is Pericles. All of the books also examine everyday life in Britain. Spring follows a string of characters and explores themes like immigration and human nature in general, as well as the aftermath of the EU referendum and growing tensions in the UK.

The novel has two central narratives, the first is the story of Richard, an older man who is dealing with the loss of someone close to him. He boards a train to Scotland, with no particular destination in mind, to try and escape or solve his emotional turmoil. The second narrative is that of Brittany, or Brit as she is named in the book. Brit works at a detention centre for migrants where she unexpectedly meets a young girl named Florence. Like Richard, Brit and Florence also happen to board a train up north to Scotland. All of the characters in the novel eventually meet at Kingussie station.

== Publication ==
Spring was first published in hardback and e-book format in the United Kingdom on 28 March 2019 through Hamish Hamilton, an imprint of Penguin Books. It was given a release in the United States via Pantheon Books on 28 March 2019, also in hardback and e-book format. The novel received a paperback release in the United Kingdom on 12 March 2020 via Penguin and in the United States on 7 April 2020, through Anchor Press.

Spring also received an audiobook adaptation narrated by Juliette Burton that was published by Recorded Books.

== Reception ==
Rebecca Makkai of The New York Times compared the novel favorably to Ulysses while Justine Jordan of The Guardian called it "a powerful vision of lost souls in a divided Britain". The Independent also reviewed Spring, writing that it was "a bold and brilliant experiment".
