= Winter (Smith novel) =

2017 novel by Ali Smith

- First edition
- Author: Ali Smith
- Cover artist: David Hockney, Winter Tunnel with Snow 2006
- Language: English
- Publisher: Hamish Hamilton
- Publication date: 2017
- Publication place: United Kingdom
- Media type: Print
- Pages: 322
- ISBN: 978-0241207024
- Preceded by: Autumn
- Followed by: Spring

Winter is a 2017 novel by Scottish author Ali Smith, first published by Hamish Hamilton, and the second of a Seasonal quartet.

== Plot ==
A family gathers in a large Cornwall house for a Christmas reunion. Joining matriarch Sophia and sister Iris is son Art, and Lux, who they believe to be Art's girlfriend, Charlotte. Art has paid Lux to pretend to be Charlotte for Christmas. Sophia suffers from visions of a disembodied child's head which follows her around, Iris is in her 70s, one of the original Greenham women, Art is a nature blogger hijacked by the original Charlotte. Lux is a Croatian and is unable to maintain her identity as Charlotte. But, like a figure in a Shakespearean romance —there are many references to “Cymbeline” - Lux magically brings Art, Iris, and Sophia together.

== Critical reception ==
Alexandra Harris in The Guardian praises the novel as being 'a pattern of visitations. The floating child-stone-head is a visitor in Sophia’s body – though there’s no knowing which part: is it a floater in her eye as well as a hallucination?. All this is the bounty of Sophia’s imagination, which complicates her role as the commercial, conventional antagonist to her sister Iris, the wild child who left home to be an activist and chained herself to the fence at Greenham Common. And there is no answer to the quarrel between the sisters, which is based on ideas of the individual’s role in the world. “I hate you,” they tell each other, and Sophia rests her head on Iris’s chest. Little is resolved at the end, but the novel works through correspondences that jump across bounds and make accord between unlike things. Leaping, laughing, sad, generous and winter-wise, this is a thing of grace.'

In The New Yorker, James Wood has reservations: 'It’s not always to my taste. The cost of inhabiting a world of postmodern Shakespearean comedy is precisely that life is seen buoyantly but not very tragically. The neatness of the pun, its capacity to make things rhyme, exists at the expense, perhaps, of mess, despair, and sheer human intractability. Yet there is also something beautiful about art as play, about witnessing jokes and figures of speech and clichés and stray words shimmer into reality—seeing them become things, become central to a book’s machinery—and then slip away again into gauzy abstraction, rather as Smith’s mysterious fictional strangers seem to pass through her books and then slip away.'

Stephanie Merritt in The Observer writes 'These novels are a deliberate publishing experiment, to see how close to publication the author can capture current events; inevitably, even at a distance of months, 11th-hour references to the Grenfell fire and Trump’s reclaiming of “Merry Christmas” already seem like snapshots of the past. “Mythologiser” is one of the insults Sophia repeatedly flings at her sister, but from this author it’s high praise; Smith is engaged in an extended process of mythologising the present state of Britain, and Winter is at its most luminously beautiful when the news fades and merges with recent and ancient history, a reminder that everything is cyclical. There is forgiveness here, and song, and comic resolution of sorts, but the abiding image is of the tenacity of nature and light.
