= Free Love and Other Stories =

1995 short story collection by Ali Smith

- First edition
- Author: Ali Smith
- Cover artist: G. W. Pabst
- Language: English
- Publisher: Virago Press
- Publication date: 1995
- Publication place: United Kingdom
- Media type: Print
- Pages: 149
- ISBN: 1-86049-190-1

Free Love and Other Stories is a short story collection by Scottish Booker-shortlisted author Ali Smith, first published in 1995 by Virago Press. It was her first published book and won the Saltire First Book of the Year award. and a Scottish Arts Council award It contains twelve short stories.

"A Sweetly memorable collection" - The Times

== Cover ==
Ali Smith chose the cover of the first edition, a picture of Louise Brooks from the G. W. Pabst film Diary of a Lost Girl (1929). The cover also includes a quote from Irish writer Bernard MacLaverty: "What a great bunch of stories".

== Stories ==
- "Free Love" : A teenage girl finds unexpected sexual freedom on a trip to Amsterdam...
- "A story of folding and unfolding" : A father unpacks his dead wife's underwear and is reminded of his first contact with her as an electrician rewiring a WAF dormitory...
- "Text for the day" : Melissa disappears and her concerned friend Austen discovers that nothing in her flat has been touched except her large book collection (from Agee to Yevtushenko) which lies scattered in a state of disarray. Melissa is soon in touch and asks Austen to send her a selection of her books annually as she is travelling the world, re-reading and distributing the pages as she goes...
- "A quick one" : A girl waits to meet her ex in a cafe and reminisces over the relationship...
- "Jenny Robertson your friend is not coming" : A girl has a meal with her friend Elizabeth in a restaurant in the Grassmarket before going to watch a film...
- "To the cinema" : A Sunday morning cinema usher describes her favourite films, the loss of her faith and her relationship with her boyfriend Geoff. Meanwhile a regular in the audience is secretly obsessed with her...
- "The touching of wood" : A girl describes a visit to the Greek island Spinalonga with her girlfriend...
- "Cold Iron : Anne McGregor has fond memories of her mother who has recently died...
- "College" : Following the death of her elder sister Gillian, Alex and her parents travel to her Cambridge College for the dedication of a bench in her honour. Afterwards her family plan a day in Kent but Alex hitches a ride in a lorry to Brighton instead...
- "Scary" : Linda travels with her boyfriend Tom to spend a night at his ex-girlfriend Zoe and her new partner Richard's. When the arrive they discover their host's scary obsession with River Phoenix...
- "The unthinkable happens to people every day" : In which a man suffers a nervous breakdown and drives to Scotland where he meets a young girl skimming stones by the edge of a loch...
- "The world with love" : A girl meets an old school friend and remembers when their French teacher 'went mad'...

== References in the book ==
=== Books mentioned in "Text for the day" ===
- Villette and Shirley by Charlotte Brontë
- Testament of Youth by Vera Brittain
- Seeing Things by Seamus Heaney
- Tender is the Night by F. Scott Fitzgerald
- Bliss by Peter Carey
- The Novel Today by Malcolm Bradbury
- Madame Bovary by Gustave Flaubert
- Selected Dramas and Lyrics of Ben Johnson
- Memoirs of a Dutiful Daughter by Simone de Beauvoir
- Dubliners by James Joyce
- The Sunday Missal and Prayer Book
- Mornings in Mexico by D. H. Lawrence

=== Films mentioned in "To the cinema" ===
- The Birth of a Nation (1915)
- Pandora's Box (1929, starring Louise Brooks)
- Beauty Prize (1930, starring Louise Brooks)
- The Wizard of Oz (1939)
- Les Enfants du Paradis (1945)
- Rashomon (1950)
- The Seventh Seal (1957)
- North by Northwest (1959)
- A Bout de Souffle (1960)
- Barbarella (1968)
- Taxi Driver (1976)
- Betty Blue (1986)
- Beauty and the Beast (1991)
- Reservoir Dogs (1992)

=== Other prominent references ===
- Crazy by Patsy Cline features in "A Quick One"
- Queen Christina (a 1933 film starring Greta Garbo) features in "Jenny Robertson your friend is not coming"
