= Robert Forbes Combe =

Scottish lawyer and chess player (1912–1952)

Personal information
- Born: Robert Forbes Combe; 16 August 1912 Logie Buchan, Aberdeenshire, Scotland
- Died: 12 February 1952 (aged 39) Aberdeen, Scotland

Chess career
- Country: Scotland

Robert Forbes Combe (16 August 1912 – 12 February 1952) was a Scottish lawyer and chess player who caused a major upset when he won the 1946 British Chess Championship ahead of several more established players.

== Biography ==
Combe-Hasenfuss
Olympiad, Folkestone 1933

Position: a8 black rook, b8 black knight, c8 black bishop, e8 black king, f8 black bishop, g8 black knight, h8 black rook, a7 black pawn, b7 black pawn, d7 black pawn, f7 black pawn, g7 black pawn, h7 black pawn, a5 black queen, e5 white knight, c4 white pawn, d4 black pawn, a2 white pawn, b2 white pawn, e2 white pawn, f2 white pawn, g2 white pawn, h2 white pawn, a1 white rook, b1 white knight, c1 white bishop, d1 white queen, e1 white king, f1 white bishop, h1 white rook

Position after 1.c4 c5 2.d4 cxd4 3.Nf3 e5 4.Nxe5?? Qa5+ 0-1

Combe was born in the parish of Logie Buchan, Aberdeenshire in 1912. His father George A. Combe was a diplomat who served in Jinan, China, where Combe spent his early childhood. He returned to Scotland to attend Aberdeen Grammar School. On holiday in London at age 16, he bought his first chess book, from which he taught himself the game. He entered his first tournament shortly afterwards. At the age of 18 he suffered a bout of rheumatic fever which left him with chronic rheumatic heart disease, which would eventually lead to his early death at age 39.

Combe played in the British Chess Federation Congress in London in 1932, finishing in a tie for fourth place with a score of 7½/11 in the First Class Section B tournament. In his first Scottish Championship in 1933, he finished with 3½/6, tying for third place behind William Fairhurst.

Subsequently, he was selected to play for Scotland at their first Chess Olympiad appearance in Folkestone, Kent. The Scots were outclassed and finished last of the 15 teams, but Combe was one of their better performers, scoring 5/12, including a win against the future Belgian champion Paul Devos. In this tournament, his only international appearance, Combe famously blundered a piece and resigned after four moves (an Olympiad record) against the Latvian master Wolfgang Hasenfuss. There is some disagreement as to the exact score of the game; the most commonly accepted version is 1.c4 c5 2.d4 cxd4 3.Nf3 e5 4.Nxe5 Qa5+ 0–1.

Combe played in his second Scottish Championship in 1934, scoring 2/5. He gave up chess for several years thereafter to concentrate on his law studies at the University of Aberdeen, where he graduated with distinction in 1938.

Combe's next Scottish Championship was in Aberdeen in 1939; he finished in a tie for second place behind the visiting American student Max Pavey.

In 1940 Combe became a partner in a law firm in Elgin, Moray. There were no other strong players in the town, severely curtailing his chess activities. Rather than playing correspondence chess, he acquired a large chess library and deeply studied the game, developing his own ideas from a study of Siegbert Tarrasch, Emanuel Lasker, José Capablanca and Alexander Alekhine. In 1945, mathematician Klaus Roth, who had played first board for Cambridge, briefly moved to Gordonstoun and became a regular sparring partner of Combe.

Combe made his comeback in the 1946 Scottish Championship in Glasgow, where he finished second behind Fairhurst. Following this, the Scottish Chess Association selected Combe as their nominee for the British championship in Nottingham. The nomination of Combe was controversial, but the British Chess Federation eventually relented and allowed him to play. In one of the most unexpected results in the history of the championship, Combe won the tournament ahead of several strong masters, including Gerald Abrahams, William Winter, Harry Golombek and Stuart Milner-Barry. He was the last Scottish player to win the championship until Jonathan Rowson won in 2004.

Due to his professional commitments, Combe played little chess afterwards. After moving to Aberdeen in 1949, he played some club chess, then represented Scotland in a match against England in 1951. In this event, he blundered and lost in a winning position against Milner-Barry.

In 1951 the Scottish Chess Association applied to FIDE for the International Master title on behalf of Combe, Aitken and Fairhurst; however, only Fairhurst was accepted.

Combe died from his heart condition in Aberdeen on 12 February 1952.
