= Chess Scotland =

Governing body for chess in Scotland

- Sport: Chess
- Jurisdiction: Scotland
- Founded: 1884
- Affiliation: FIDE
- Regional affiliation: European Chess Union
- President: Alex McFarlane

Official website
- www.chessscotland.com

Chess Scotland is the governing body for chess in Scotland. It was formed in 2001 with the merger of the Scottish Chess Association (SCA) and the Scottish Junior Chess Association (SJCA).

It is one of the oldest national chess associations in the world, the SCA having been founded in 1884. As the national organisation for chess, Chess Scotland is the affiliate to the International Chess Federation (FIDE) and appoints the Scottish delegate to FIDE's Council. Its international director is responsible for selecting the teams which represent Scotland at the biennial Chess Olympiad.

== Objective and functions ==
Its principal objective is to "foster and promote the game of chess throughout Scotland among players of all ages".

Its principal functions are:

- to represent the interests of Scottish chess (at FIDE and elsewhere),
- to select individuals and teams to represent Scotland at international chess events,
- to hold national and international chess tournaments in Scotland
- to promote the game of chess in Scotland
- to train and appoint officials
- to operate a national grading system

Chess Scotland's functions are performed by unpaid volunteers and is registered as a non-profit organisation. Its turn-over in 2009 was approximately £35,000, of which a third was provided by the Scottish Government via annual grant aid. In 2013 the Government grant ceased.

== Membership ==
Many people can play chess and a significant proportion of these have an active interest in the game (e.g., internet chess, parents/guardians of junior players, etc.). The number of players currently known to Chess Scotland is more than 5000, of whom about half are juniors. Approximately 3000 currently-active players have played sufficient games in official events (not necessarily events organized by Chess Scotland) to be assigned a national rating (grade) for their standard of play. Chess Scotland therefore serves a very wide constituency from school children to International Grandmasters. As of 17 February 2025, Chess Scotland lists the membership as c460 of which over 40 have not activated their account.

== Organisation ==
The affairs of Chess Scotland are managed by its directors and other officials who work (with other promoters, as appropriate) to fulfil the objectives of the organisation. Most of these posts are filled by election at the Annual General Meeting of Chess Scotland. Chess events are supervised by certified arbiters who must undergo written and practical competency tests administered by Chess Scotland. Chess Scotland also maintains a register of approved coaches and chaperons. All of these officials (arbiters, coaches and chaperons) are required to undergo “Disclosure” certification, under Scottish Child Protection legislation.

== Online ==
Apart from the publicity surrounding its events, Chess Scotland's activities are communicated to the general public (including children) and to its sponsors via its internet web-pages. An on-line forum promotes discussion of chess-related topics of current interest. In addition, Chess Scotland publishes a magazine which appears six times a year.

== Rating system ==
The Chess Scotland on-line rating system is important for many players, and the rating system is a source of significant revenue to Chess Scotland. Application to Chess Scotland for the recognition of an event (or player) for rating purposes brings the event (or player) within the jurisdiction of Chess Scotland.

== Commonwealth Chess Championships in Glasgow 2014 ==
Chess Scotland was successful in bidding for the 2014 Commonwealth Chess Championships and they were held in Glasgow.

== World Championship 2022 ==
For the first time, a member of Chess Scotland, IA Andy Howie, was the Deputy Chief Arbiter for a World Championship match

== Grandmasters ==
Below is a list of members who have been awarded the Grandmaster (GM) title by FIDE.

- Paul Motwani
- Colin McNab
- Jacob Aagaard
- Jonathan Rowson
- John Shaw
- Ketevan Arakhamia-Grant
- Matthew Turner

== See also ==
- Scottish Chess Championship
