= Stewart Haslinger =

English chess grandmaster (born 1981)

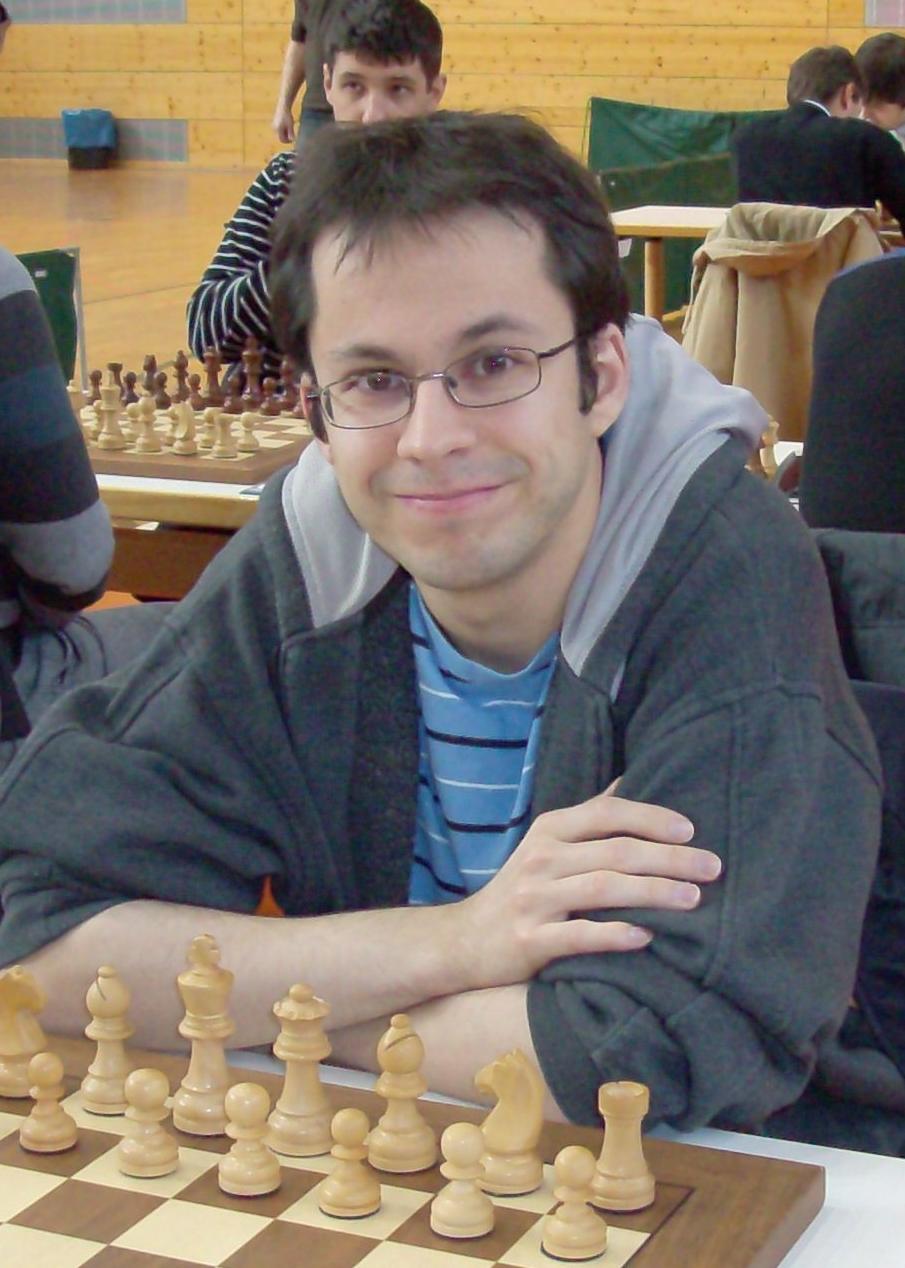
- Haslinger in 2009

Personal information
- Born: Stewart Gavin Haslinger; 25 November 1981 (age 44) Ainsdale, Southport

Chess career
- Country: England
- Title: Grandmaster (2007)
- FIDE rating: 2515 (July 2026)
- Peak rating: 2559 (January 2010)

Stewart Gavin Haslinger (born 25 November 1981 in Ainsdale, Merseyside) is an English chess Grandmaster and former British Junior champion.

== Biography ==
Now a resident of nearby Formby, Haslinger comes from a strong chess-playing family. Taught by his father at four years of age, he became British under-12 champion in 1993, in step with the achievements of sisters Cathy and Mandy, who were British girls' junior champions across the range of age groups. Cathy progressed to become World Youth Champion (for girls under-14) in 1987.

Haslinger finished a Master's degree in mathematics at Liverpool University in 2006 and decided to spend some time trying to become a chess Grandmaster. Achieving his aim sooner than expected, he gained his final two norms at the 2006/7 4NCL and at the Caerleon South Wales International 2007, having previously earned a norm at the British Championship of 2002. It was around the time of his first norm that he experienced a leap forward in his chess, following several months of dedicated chess study during a period of ill health.

Haslinger has represented SG Trier in the German Schachbundesliga from 2009. He began his studies for a PhD in applied mathematics at the University of Liverpool in 2010 and was awarded it in 2014.

== Tournament highlights ==
- British Championship, Torquay, 2002 – Fourth place after Ramachandran Ramesh, Joseph Gallagher and Krishnan Sasikiran (GM Norm attained).
- Blackpool Hilton Premier, 2003 – Fourth place after Abhijit Kunte, John Shaw and Nigel Davies.
- British Championship, Douglas, 2005 – Shared second place, after Jonathan Rowson.
- Four Nations Chess League, 2006/7 – 6.5/9 (GM Norm attained).
- South Wales International, Caerleon, 2007 – Second place, after Marat Dzhumaev (GM Norm attained).
- British Championship, Great Yarmouth, 2007 – Shared fourth place, after Jacob Aagaard, Jonathan Rowson and Stephen Gordon.
- Four Nations Chess Challenge, Oslo, 2008 – In his international (England team) debut, he contributed a plus score, helping England to second place.
- Benidorm, 2008 – Shared first place, with Vladimir Burmakin, Boris Avrukh and Eduardo Iturrizaga.
- South Wales International, Pontypridd, 2008 – Shared first place with Normunds Miezis
- Essent Open Hoogeveen, 2008 – Shared first place, with Friso Nijboer and Alexandr Fier.
- 3rd Open, Palma de Mallorca, 2008 – First place.
- Hilversum Open, 2009 – Shared first place with Daniel Fridman, Mikhail Krasenkov and Predrag Nikolić.
- Unive Open, Hoogeveen, 2009 – First place (a point clear of ten other Grandmasters).
- Seville International Open 2011 – Shared first place with Deep Sengupta
- Noteboom Memorial, Leiden 2011 – Shared second place after Jan Smeets
- Seville International Open 2013 – First place (a point clear of field including ten other Grandmasters).
- Haarlem ROC Nova College Schaaktoernooi 2013 - First place.

== Notable game ==
Haslinger vs. Jaunouby, Bolton 2008

Position: a8 black rook, c8 black bishop, f8 black rook, h8 black king, c7 black queen, h7 black pawn, a6 black pawn, c6 black knight, e6 black pawn, h6 white pawn, c5 black pawn, e5 black bishop, g5 white queen, b4 black pawn, c4 white bishop, g4 white pawn, h3 white pawn, a2 white pawn, b2 white pawn, c2 white pawn, e2 white knight, h2 white bishop, c1 white king, d1 white rook, h1 white rook

Position after 21...Nc6

S Haslinger-A Jaunouby, Bolton Congress, 2008, Modern Defence 1.e4 g6 2.d4 Bg7 3.Nc3 d6 4.Be3 a6 5.f4 Nf6 6.Nf3 b5 7.e5 Ng4 8.Bg1 f6 9.h3 Nh6 10.Bd3 fxe5 11.dxe5 c6?! 12.Qd2 Qc7 13.0–0–0 0–0 14.g4 dxe5 15.Nxe5 g5 16.fxg5 b4 17.Bc4+ e6 18.Ne2 Bxe5 19.gxh6 c5 20.Qg5+ Kh8 21.Bh2! Nc6 Diagram. 22.Rhf1!! Rg8 23.Rd8!! (The rook is en prise in three different ways, but all lines are winning for White) Rxd8 24.Bxe5+ Qxe5 25.Qxd8+! 1-0

(if 24...Nxe5 25.Rf7! Qxf7 26.Qxd8+ Qg8 27.Qf6+ Qg7 28.Qxg7 mate or 24...Nxe5 25.Rf7! Nxf7 26.Qg7 mate)
