= Zeev Zohar =

Israeli author (born 1962)

- זאב זוהר
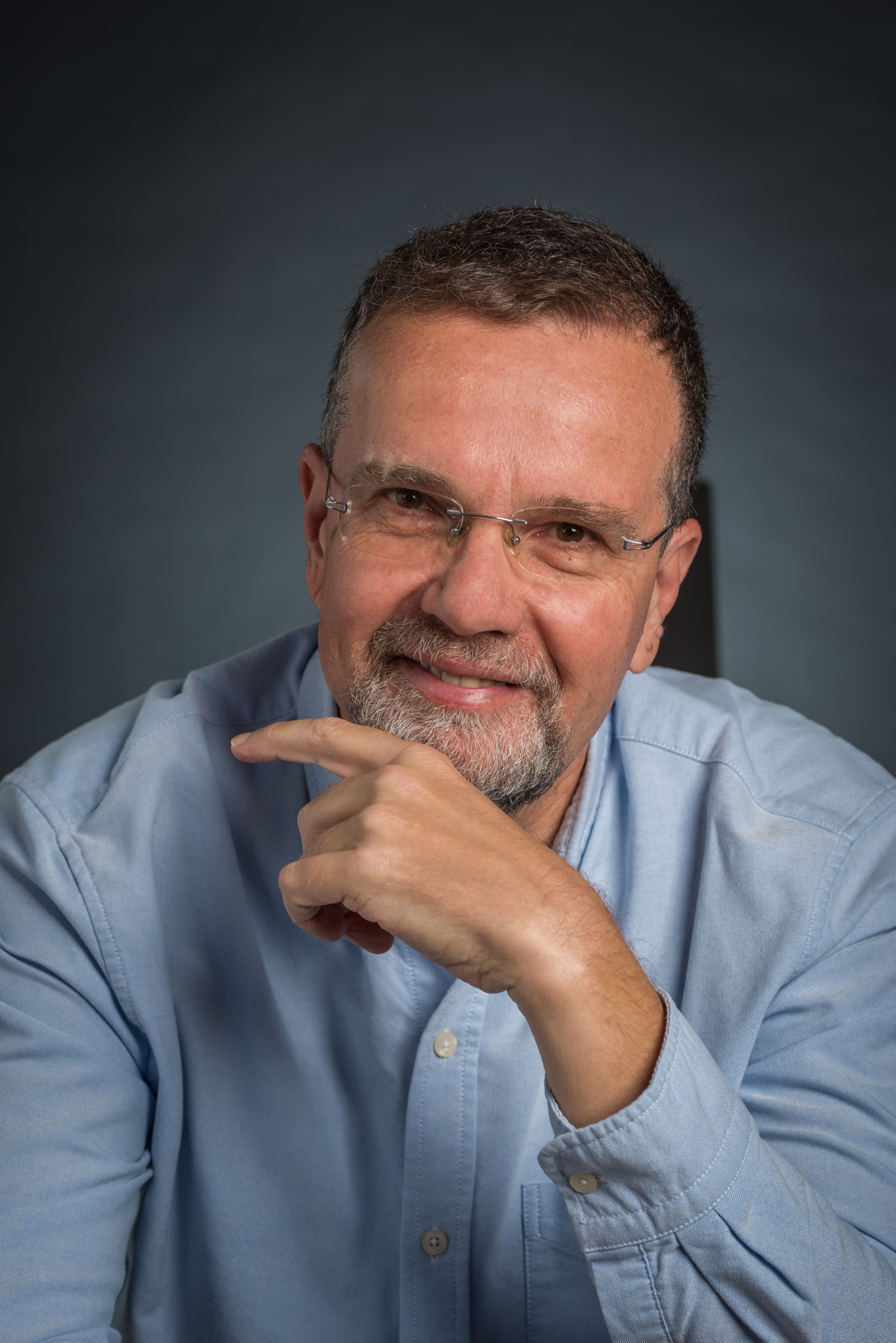
- Born: 23 July 1962 (age 63); Petah Tikva, Israel
- Occupation: Businessman
- Years active: 1989–present
- Organization: Zohar-Gold Net Saving (until 2019)
- Known for: Chess authorship

Zeev Zohar (Hebrew: זאב זוהר; born July 23, 1962) is an author on the field of technology and chess (a chess candidate master), an accountant, businessman, and director of public companies. In the second decade of the 21st century, he participated in the post-graduate program "philosophy, information and digital culture" at Tel Aviv University.

Zohar was an outstanding chess player in his youth. He was awarded the title of Candidate Master by the Israeli Chess Federation. Representing "Bikurei Haitim" Tel Aviv chess club he won the Israeli Junior Team Championship. In 1983 Zohar successfully participated in the IDF chess championship, representing the "Pikud Mercaz" team, led by master Ehud Gross who won the IDF team championship. Zohar had the best individual result of the championship, 8.5 out of 9, playing third board.

In 2018 Zohar participated in a Jerusalem simul by World Champion Anatoly Karpov and was one of two players (out of 22) who managed to draw against chess legend Anatoly Karpov, FIDE world champion from 1975 to 1985 and winner of more than 140 international tournaments.

== Biography ==
Zohar was born in Petah Tikva (Israel) and grew up in Kiryat Ono. He became an Accounting and Economy graduate in 1989 and started as an intern in the office of Lyoboshits-Kasirer which later merged with Ernst & Young. Later Zohar served as finance deputy CEO in water park Meimadion and in Shelah company. In 1993 Zohar became a freelancer, he founded and directed "Zohar Financial Planning" which was active in the field of Human Resources and Financial Advising. The company specialized in reducing salary and other costs and dealing with grants. It delivered services to hundreds of leading public companies and employed dozens of workers.

From 2004 till 2019 Zohar was co-owner of "Zohar-Gold Net Saving", a leading company in its field in Israel which helped many big organizations and companies save on operative and financial costs by significant amounts. The main topics dealt with, among others, were communication, leasing, and energy. Some of the main customers were Company for Israel, Teva, Air Industries, five insurance companies, car importers, and others. In 2011 Zohar was a member of the delegation of businessmen accompanying President Shimon Peres in his visit to Vietnam.

Zohar has been a director in public companies.

== Authoring Chess Books ==
Zohar co-authored two chess books with Noam Manella.

The first book Play Unconventional Chess and Win was published in 2014 by Everyman Chess The authors were helped by chess editor GM Ram Soffer. This book investigates the influence of technological progress on the creativity of top chess players. World Champion Vishy Anand and Vice World Champion Boris Gelfand both contributed a foreword.

This book has three main sections:

- Reevaluating Things
- Breaking Free of Fixation
- The Pro-Active King

It contains 137 game positions and studies involving top chess players, past and present. The second book Think Like a Machine was also co-authored by Manella and Zohar. It was published by Quality Chess . The chess editors were GM Ram Soffer and GM Jacob Aagaard. This book was awarded second place in the competition for the FIDE Yuri Averbakh-Isaak Boleslavsky award for the best chess book of 2020 . The authors' first book Play Unconventional Chess and Win became a hit amongst chess books of 2014.
