= Murad Abdulla =

Scottish chess player (born 2000)

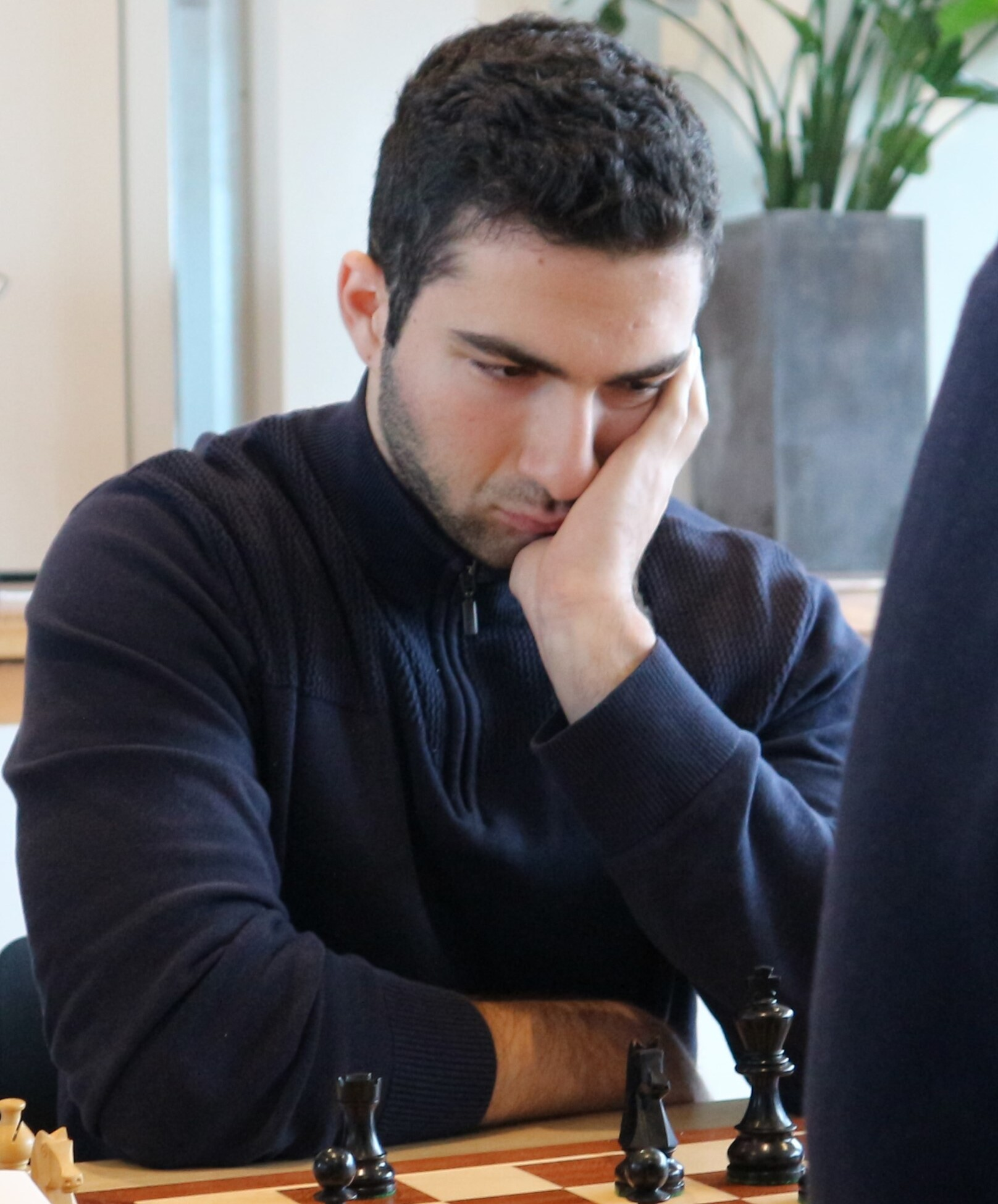
- Abdulla in 2023

Personal information
- Born: 2000 (age 25–26) Baku, Azerbaijan

Chess career
- Country: Scotland
- Title: FIDE Master (2017)
- Peak rating: 2344 (December 2025)

Murad Abdulla (Azerbaijani: Murad Mahir oğlu Abdulla; born 2000) is a Scottish chess player.

== Chess career ==
In July 2017, he won the Scottish Chess Championship for the first time after being the highest-scoring Scottish player. This made him the second-youngest Scottish champion, only months younger than grandmaster Paul Motwani after his first victory.

In July 2022, he won the Scottish Chess Championship for the third time, beating Keith Ruxton on tiebreak scores.

In January 2024, he played in the Tata Steel Top Tienkamp tournament, where he achieved wins against higher-rated players Tristan Niermann and Nico Zwirs.

In September 2024, he played for Scotland in the 45th Chess Olympiad, where he held draws against grandmasters Gabor Papp, Ilmārs Starostīts, and Rodrigo Vásquez Schroeder.

== Personal life ==
He was born in 2000 in Azerbaijan and moved to Scotland with his family at the age of 5. He studied data science at the University of St Andrews and currently works as a software engineer at IMC in Amsterdam.
