= Ketevan Arakhamia-Grant =

Georgian-Scottish chess grandmaster (born 1968)

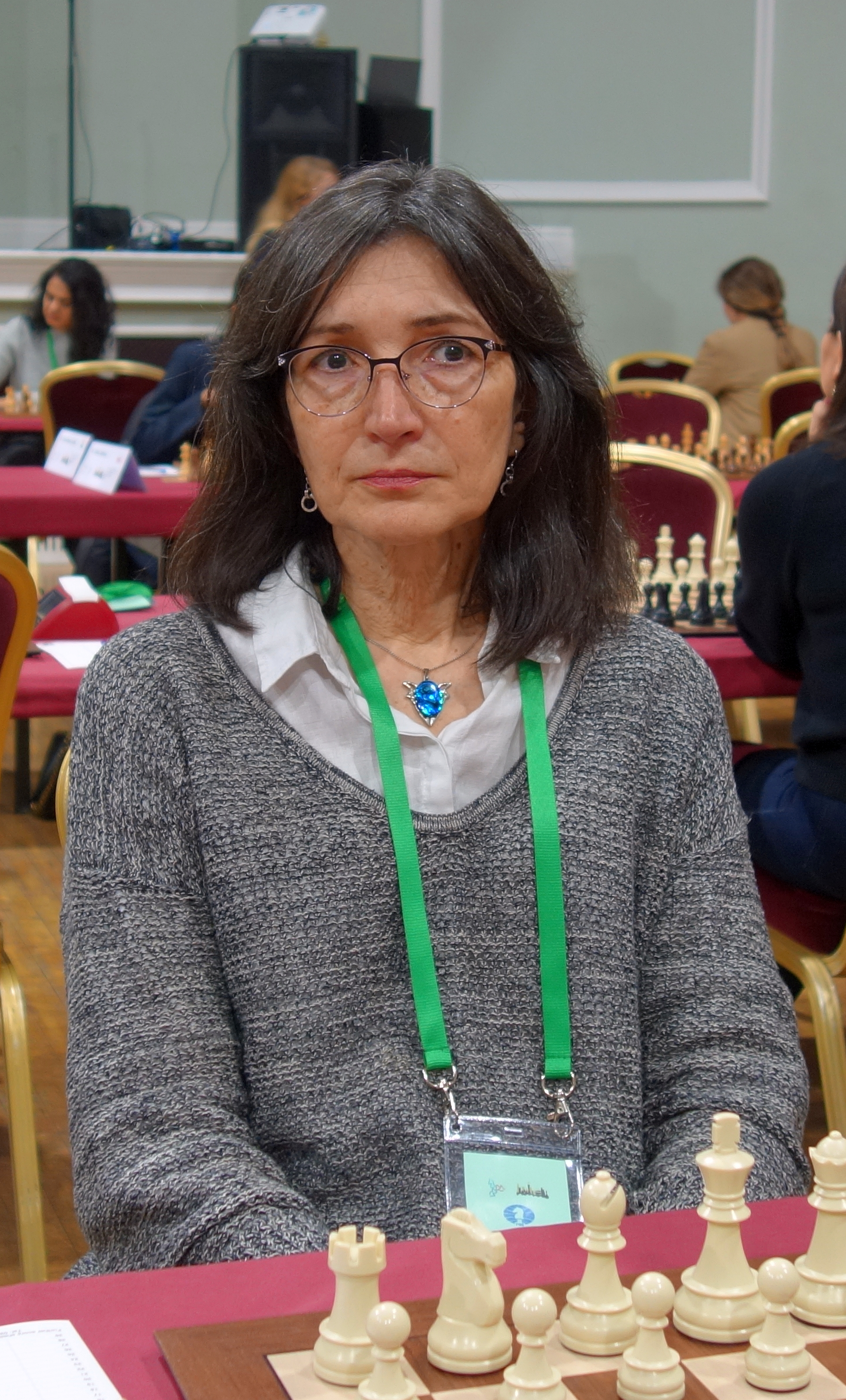
- Arakhamia-Grant in 2023

Personal information
- Born: 19 July 1968 (age 58) Ochamchire, Georgian SSR, Soviet Union

Chess career
- Country: Soviet Union (until 1991); Georgia (1992–2007); Scotland (since 2008)
- Title: Grandmaster (2009)
- Peak rating: 2506 (July 2009)

Ketevan Arakhamia-Grant (née Arakhamia; Georgian: ქეთევან არახამია-გრანტი; born 19 July 1968) is a Georgian-born Scottish Chess Grandmaster.

== Chess career ==
In 1985, she won the World Junior Chess Championship for Girls, held in Dobrna (and taking silver in Adelaide three years later). Very soon thereafter, she fulfilled the criteria for the Woman International Master title, being awarded in 1986. She won the 1993 Jakarta Interzonal and the 1995 Kishinev Interzonal, but her performances in the respective Candidates Tournaments ruled out an opportunity to play for the world title. She won the Women's Soviet Chess Championship in 1990.

Aside from world championship competitions, in 1990 she took first place at both the Biel Women's Open and Geneva (IM), then followed up by winning the Doeberl Cup in Canberra, Australia in 1991, becoming the first woman to do so. Her participation at the Hastings Premier in 1993–94, where she finished ahead of six male grandmasters, was also notable.

In the 1990s, she participated in the Veterans vs Ladies dance-themed tournaments where she defeated Borislav Ivkov, Vlastimil Hort, Vasily Smyslov and Mark Taimanov.

In team chess, Arakhamia debuted at Chess Olympiad at Novi Sad in 1990, representing the USSR Ladies team as first reserve and registering a perfect 12/12 score. With the Soviet and then Georgian Ladies Teams, she has won nine Olympiad medals, including two team and three individual gold medals. She has won medals at the European Team Chess Championships; a team gold at Pula in 1997 and team silver medals in 1992 and 2005.

Despite moving to the UK, Arakhamia continued to represent Georgia for many years, through membership of its national chess federation. She was the Georgian Ladies Champion in 1983, 1984 and 1990. In January 2008 however, she switched her registration to her adopted country.

Post-millennium, she has won a bronze medal at the Women's European Individual Championship at Warsaw in 2001. She was Scottish champion jointly with Paul Motwani in 2003 (the first ever woman to achieve the honour) and has participated at the British Championship, taking the Ladies' Champion titles of 2003, 2004, 2006, and 2007. In 2006, she was the first woman to be second when she finished behind overall Championship winner Jonathan Rowson. 2006 was also the year that her husband took first place in the Scottish Championship, making them the first ever husband–wife pair to win a full national championship. Also in 2006, in Batumi, she assisted the Australian squad by coaching their Under-10 Girls at the World Youth Chess Championship.

In 2007, she beat former U.S. Champion Hikaru Nakamura at Gibraltar Masters, in a 100-move first round encounter. Journalist John Saunders describes Arakhamia-Grant as the ideal role model: "her charming and dignified manner belies a tough, determined fighter at the board."

While visiting her sister in Philadelphia, she played the World Open and finished top in the female category. As the tournament was a qualifier for the MonRoi Women's Grand Prix, she earned a place in the Montreal finale, held just a few weeks later. There, she shared the lead after five rounds and finished in joint fourth place.

As part of the festivities for Liverpool being European Capital of Culture in 2008, she played in the United Kingdom vs China match and was top scorer for the UK with 4/6, although China won the match.

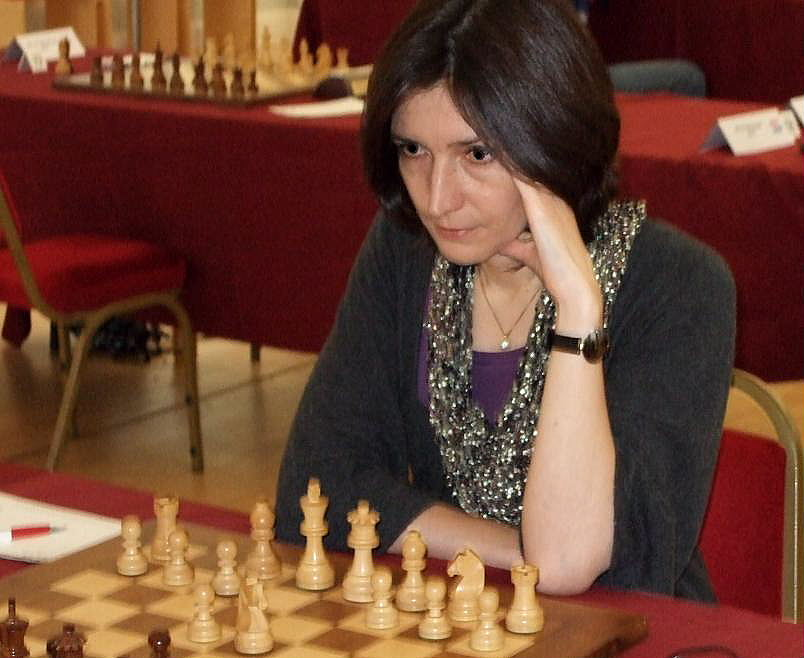
Arakhamia-Grant at the 2008 EU Championship

At the 2008 EU Individual Open Chess Championship in Liverpool, she shared the highest scoring woman prize with Jovanka Houska and Yelena Dembo. At the Olympiad in Dresden, she played for Scotland in the main event and completed her final grandmaster norm with victory in the final round. Having additionally met the 2500 Elo rating requirement in the January 2009 FIDE list, she was awarded the title in March 2009, making her Scotland's sixth grandmaster. In August 2009 Arakhamia-Grant won the Baltic Queen round-robin tournament in Saint Petersburg.

In July 2011, she won the Scottish Championship outright, finishing with the score of 7/9. In league chess, Arakhamia-Grant has played for OSC Baden-Baden in the Women's Bundesliga and for Georgian team Interplast Tbilisi in the European Club Cup. For the 2008–9 season, she represents Wood Green Hilsmark Kingfisher 1 in the British 4NCL.

== Family ==
In 1996, she married Jonathan Grant, also a chess player, and they settled in Edinburgh, later giving birth to daughter Elena.

== Notable games ==
Semenova vs. Arakhamia, Jakarta 1993

Position: e1 white rook, d1 white rook, c1 white king, h2 white pawn, g2 white pawn, f2 white pawn, d2 white knight, a2 white pawn, c3 white pawn, b3 white pawn, c4 white bishop, a4 white queen, f5 black bishop, c5 white pawn, a5 black pawn, h6 black bishop, g6 black pawn, f6 black pawn, h7 black pawn, f7 black pawn, b7 black rook, g8 black king, d8 black queen, b8 black rook

Position after 19.Rhe1!

Lidia Semenova vs. Arakhamia, Jakarta Interzonal, 1993; Torre Attack

1.d4 d5 2.Bg5 Nd7 3.Nf3 Ngf6 4.Nbd2 g6 5.c3 Bg7 6.Qc2 0-0 7.e4 dxe4 8.Nxe4 Nxe4 9.Qxe4 Nf6 10. Bxf6? exf6! 11.0-0-0 Bh6+ 12.Nd2 Bf5! 13.Qxb7 c5! 14.dxc5 Re8 15.Bc4 Re7 16.Qb4 Rb8 17.Qa4 Reb7 18.b3 a5 19.Rhe1! (diagram) Rb4 20.Re8+ (20.cxb4 is followed by 20...Qd4 and checkmate very soon) Qxe8 21.Qxe8+ Rxe8 22.cxb4 axb4 23.c6 Ra8 24.c7 Bf4 25.Re1 Bxc7 25.Re7 Bf4 27.Rxf7 Kh8 28.g3 Be5 29.Kd1 Bc3 30.Nf1 Rxa2 31.Ne3 Be4 32.Rf8+ Kg7 33.Rg8+ Kh6 34.Ng4+ Kg5 35.h3 Ra1+ 36.Ke2 Re1# 0–1

Conquest vs. Arakhamia-Grant, Edinburgh 2003

Position: h1 white rook, e1 white king, d1 white queen, a1 white rook, g2 white pawn, f2 white pawn, a2 white pawn, f3 white knight, c3 white pawn, e4 white pawn, c4 black bishop, f5 black pawn, d5 white pawn, c5 black pawn, h6 white bishop, g6 black pawn, e7 black pawn, d7 black knight, b7 black pawn, a7 black pawn, g8 black king, f8 black rook, d8 black queen, a8 black rook

Position after 16.bxc3

Stuart Conquest vs. Arakhamia-Grant, British Ch. Edinburgh, 2003; Grünfeld Defence

1.d4 Nf6 2.c4 g6 3.Nc3 d5 4.cxd5 Nxd5 5.Bd2 Bg7 6.e4 Nb6 7.Be3 0-0 8.Bb5!? Be6!? 9.Nf3 Nc4 10.Bxc4 Bxc4 11.h4 Nd7 12.h5 c5! 13.d5 f5! 14.hxg6 hxg6 15.Bh6?! Bxc3! 16.bxc3 (diagram) fxe4! 17.Bxf8 exf3 18.Qxf3 Nxf8 19.Rd1 Qd6 20.Qe4 b5 21.f4 Rd8 22.Kf2 Bxd5 23.Qe3 Qe6! 24.Qg3 Rd6 25.Rhe1 Qf6 26.Kg1 Bxa2 27.f5 Bc4 28.fxg6 Nxg6 29.Qe3 Rxd1 30.Rxd1 Nf4 31.Rd8+ Kf7 32.Rd2 Nd5! 33.Qxc5 Qf1+ 34.Kh2 Qf4+ 0–1

Arakhamia-Grant vs. Kosteniuk, Warsaw 2001

Position: c8 black rook, h8 black rook, e7 black bishop, f7 black king, a6 black pawn, b6 black queen, c6 white knight, e6 black pawn, f6 black pawn, h6 black pawn, b4 black pawn, e4 white queen, a2 white pawn, b2 white pawn, c2 white pawn, g2 white pawn, h2 white pawn, b1 white king, d1 white rook, h1 white rook

Position after 26...Rc8

Arakhamia-Grant vs. Alexandra Kosteniuk, 2nd Women's European Ch., 2001; Sicilian Defense

1.e4 c5 2.Nf3 Nc6 3.d4 cxd4 4.Nxd4 Nf6 5.Nc3 d6 6.Bg5 e6 7.Qd2 a6 8.0-0-0 h6 9.Be3 Be7 10.f4 Nxd4 11.Bxd4 b5 12.Qe3 Bb7 13.Bxf6 gxf6 14.Bd3 Qa5 15.Kb1 b4 16.Ne2 Qc5 17.Nd4 d5 18.Qe2 Kf8 19.Nb3 Qb6 20.exd5 Bxd5 21.Be4 Bxe4 22.Qxe4 Kg7 23.f5 Rad8 24.fxe6 fxe6 25.Nd4 Kf7 26.Nc6 Rc8 (diagram) 27.Ne5+ fxe5 28.Rhf1+ Kg7 29.Qg4+ Bg5 30.Rd7+ 1–0
