= Andrew Greet =

British chess player (born 1979)

Personal information
- Born: October 5, 1979 (age 47) Truro, England

Chess career
- Country: England (until 2013); Scotland (since 2013)
- Title: International Master (2005)
- Peak rating: 2464 (October 2016)

Andrew N. Greet is a British chess player.

== Chess career ==
He won the Scottish Chess Championship four times: in 2010, 2024 (defeating Peter Large in tiebreaks), 2025 and 2026.

In July 2017, he won the Dundee Grandmaster tournament with a score of 6/9, ahead of grandmasters Simon Williams, Martin Petr, Spyridon Kapnisis and Ketevan Arakhamia-Grant.
