= Peter Michael Jamieson =

Scottish chess player (born 1946)

Peter McKeich Jamieson
Personal information
- Born: 1 July 1946 (age 80) Glasgow, Scotland

Chess career
- Country: Scotland
- Title: FIDE Master (1989)
- Peak rating: 2315 (January 1979)

Peter McKeich Jamieson (born 1 July 1946) is a Scottish chess player, FIDE Master and twice a Scottish Chess Championship winner (1965, 1973).

== Biography ==
Jamieson was born in Glasgow in 1946, and in 1963 he won the British Boys' Chess Championships (U18). He was a participant in the Glorney Cup in 1962, 1963, and 1964. In 1965, Jamieson represented Scotland at the World Junior Chess Championship. Jamieson won the Scottish Championship twice: 1965 (shared with James Macrae Aitken) and 1973.

Jamieson played for Scotland in the Chess Olympiads:

- In 1970, at first reserve board in the 19th Chess Olympiad in Siegen (+3, =2, −5),
- In 1972, at fourth board in the 20th Chess Olympiad in Skopje (+7, =6, −3),
- In 1974, at fourth board in the 21st Chess Olympiad in Nice (+8, =4, −5),
- In 1976, at third board in the 22nd Chess Olympiad in Haifa (+4, =2, −2),
- In 1978, at third board in the 23rd Chess Olympiad in Buenos Aires (+4, =5, −3).

Jamieson played for Scotland in the World Student Team Chess Championships:

- In 1966, at first board in the 13th World Student Team Chess Championship in Örebro (+3, =0, −6),
- In 1967, at first board in the 14th World Student Team Chess Championship in Harrachov (+3, =1, −6).

In recent years, Jamieson has been playing for Scotland in Senior World and European Team Championships.

Jamieson was awarded the FIDE Master title in 1989.
