= Alexander Munro Davie =

Scottish mathematician

Alexander Munro Davie FRSE
- Born: April 4, 1946 (age 79); Dundee, Scotland
- Other names: Sandy
- Occupation: mathematician
- Years active: 1960–????
- Known for: Being the chess champion of Scotland in 1964, 1966, and 1969

Alexander "Sandy" Munro Davie FRSE (born 4 April 1946 in Dundee) is a Scottish mathematician and was the chess champion of Scotland in 1964, 1966, and 1969.

He grew up in Dundee, attending the High School of Dundee, and he was encouraged to play chess by Nancy Elder. He was the Scottish Chess Association's Scottish Boys' Champion in 1960 and 1962. He won the Scottish Chess Championship for 1964, 1966, and 1969 and in 1966 was a member of the Scottish team at the 13th World Student Team Chess Championship at Örebro, Sweden. His last FIDE rating was 2280.

Davie received his PhD in 1970 from the University of Dundee. In 1973 he was elected a Fellow of the Royal Society of Edinburgh. He became a professor of mathematics at the University of Edinburgh, where he is currently retired. His mathematical research deals with dynamical systems and stochastic analysis. He also has "some interest in applications of analysis to PDE, complexity of matrix multiplication and applications of mathematics to biology, particularly protein folding." In 1986 he was an invited speaker at the International Congress of Mathematicians in Berkeley, California.

== Selected publications ==
- Davie, A. M.; Øksendal, B. K. (1971). "Rational approximation on the union of sets". Proceedings of the American Mathematical Society. 29 (3): 581. doi:10.1090/S0002-9939-1971-0277725-6.
- Davie, A. M. (1972). "Analytic capacity and approximation problems". Transactions of the American Mathematical Society. 171: 409. doi:10.1090/S0002-9947-1972-0350009-9.
- Davie, A. M. (1972). "Bounded limits of analytic functions". Proceedings of the American Mathematical Society. 32: 127. doi:10.1090/S0002-9939-1972-0293069-1.
- Dales, H.G; Davie, A.M (1973). "Quasianalytic Banach function algebras". Journal of Functional Analysis. 13: 28–50. doi:10.1016/0022-1236(73)90065-7.
- Davie, A. M.; Gamelin, T. W.; Garnett, J. (1973). "Distance estimates and pointwise bounded density". Transactions of the American Mathematical Society. 175: 37. doi:10.1090/S0002-9947-1973-0313514-8.
- Davie, A. M. (1976). "Classification of essentially normal operators". Spaces of Analytic Functions. Lecture Notes in Mathematics. Vol. 512. pp. 31–55. doi:10.1007/BFb0080022. ISBN 978-3-540-07682-7.
- Davie, A.M; Jewell, N.P (1977). "Toeplitz operators in several complex variables". Journal of Functional Analysis. 26 (4): 356–368. doi:10.1016/0022-1236(77)90020-9.
- Davie, A. M. (1979). "The 'singles' method for segregation analysis under incomplete ascertainment". Annals of Human Genetics. 42 (4): 507–512. doi:10.1111/j.1469-1809.1979.tb00683.x. PMID 475337. S2CID 43035475.
- Bernard, Alain; Campbell, Eddy A.; Davie, A. M. (1979). "Brownian motion and generalized analytic and inner functions". Annales de l'Institut Fourier. 29: 207–228. doi:10.5802/aif.735.
- Davie, A. M. (1985). "Matrix norms related to Grothendieck's inequality". Banach Spaces. Lecture Notes in Mathematics. Vol. 1166. pp. 22–26. doi:10.1007/BFb0074689. ISBN 978-3-540-16051-9.
- Davie, A. M.; Gamelin, T. W. (1989). "A theorem on polynomial-star approximation". Proceedings of the American Mathematical Society. 106 (2): 351. doi:10.1090/S0002-9939-1989-0947313-8.
- Byatt-Smith, J. G. B.; Davie, A. M. (1990). "A rigorous proof of an exponentially small estimate for a boundary value arising from an ordinary differential equation". Proceedings of the Royal Society of Edinburgh Section A: Mathematics. 114 (3–4): 243–258. doi:10.1017/S0308210500024422.
- Davie, A.M.; Dutta, T.K. (1993). "Period-doubling in two-parameter families". Physica D: Nonlinear Phenomena. 64 (4): 345–354. Bibcode:1993PhyD...64..345D. doi:10.1016/0167-2789(93)90047-5.
- Davie, A. M. (1994). "The critical function for the semistandard map". Nonlinearity. 7 (1): 219–229. Bibcode:1994Nonli...7..219D. doi:10.1088/0951-7715/7/1/009.
- Davie, A. M. (1996). "Period doubling for $C^{2+\epsilon}$ mappings". Communications in Mathematical Physics. 176 (2): 261–272. Bibcode:1996CMaPh.176..261D. doi:10.1007/BF02099549. S2CID 118678520.
- Davie, A. M. (2007). "Differential equations driven by rough paths: An approach via discrete approximation". arXiv:0710.0772 [math.PR].
- Davie, Alexander M.; Urbański, Mariusz; Zdunik, Anna (2007). "Maximizing Measures on Metrizable Non-Compact Spaces". Proceedings of the Edinburgh Mathematical Society. 50: 123–151. doi:10.1017/S0013091505000179. S2CID 122852202. 2007
- Davie, A. M. (2010). "Uniqueness of Solutions of Stochastic Differential Equations". International Mathematics Research Notices. arXiv:0709.4147. doi:10.1093/imrn/rnm124.
- Davie, A. M. (2010). "Differential Equations Driven by Rough Paths: An Approach via Discrete Approximation". Applied Mathematics Research Express. arXiv:0710.0772. doi:10.1093/amrx/abm009.
- Davie, Alexander M. (2011). "Individual Path Uniqueness of Solutions of Stochastic Differential Equations". Stochastic Analysis 2010. pp. 213–225. doi:10.1007/978-3-642-15358-7_10. ISBN 978-3-642-15357-0.
- Davie, A. M.; Stothers, A. J. (2013). "Improved bound for complexity of matrix multiplication". Proceedings of the Royal Society of Edinburgh Section A: Mathematics. 143 (2): 351–369. doi:10.1017/S0308210511001648. S2CID 113401430.
