= Arthur MacKenzie =

Arthur MacKenzie may refer to:

- Arthur R. MacKenzie (1873–1963), Canadian politician in the Legislative Assembly of New Brunswick
- Arthur W. MacKenzie (1898–1986), army officer and political figure in Nova Scotia, Canada
- Arthur Stanley Mackenzie (1865–1938), Canadian physicist and university president
- Arthur John Mackenzie (1871–1949), Scottish chess player

== See also ==
- Arthur McKenzie (1879–1916), Australian rules footballer
- Arthur McKenzie (cricketer) (1914–1955), Jamaican cricketer
