= Jonathan Parker (chess player) =

English chess grandmaster (born 1976)

Personal information
- Born: 19 March 1976 (age 50)

Chess career
- Country: England
- Title: Grandmaster (2001)
- FIDE rating: 2502 (November 2026)
- Peak rating: 2570 (July 2002)

Jonathan Parker (born 19 March 1976) is a British chess player, who became a grandmaster in 2001.

In 1987 he was champion of Nottinghamshire and in 1994 he was the Scottish champion.

In 1993 he became an International Master (IM), while eight years later attaining the title grandmaster (GM).

In 1995 he was shared 2nd−8th at the Hastings International Chess Congress.

In 1996 he was the British junior champion in the age group "Under 21".

In 1998 he won the Berlin Summer Open tournament, with 7.5 points out of 9 rounds.

In 2006 he finished shared 3rd–6th at the British chess championship, held in Swansea, finishing one point below the winner Jonathan Rowson.
