= Robert Combe =

Robert Combe may refer to:

- Bobby Combe (1924–1991), Scottish footballer
- Robert Combe (MP) for Lostwithiel (UK Parliament constituency) and Liskeard
- Robert Grierson Combe (1880–1917), Canadian recipient of the Victoria Cross
- Robert Forbes Combe (1912–1952), Scottish chess player
