= Daniel Yarnton Mills =

Scottish chess master (1849–1904)

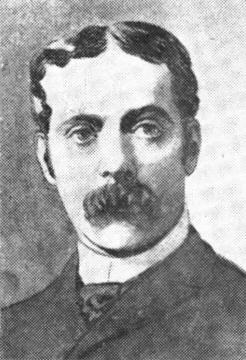
Daniel Yarnton Mills

Daniel Yarnton Mills (29 August 1849, Stroud, Gloucestershire, England – 17 December 1904, London, England) was a Scottish chess master.

Mills won the Scottish Chess Championships on eight occasions (in 1885, 1887, 1892, 1895, 1896, 1897, 1899 and 1900) and was British Amateur Champion in 1890. Mills represented Great Britain in all the cable matches between Great Britain and the United States (1896–1911), without losing a game.

An active organizer, Mills was one of the founders and Secretary of the British Chess Club; one of the founders of the British Chess Association, and Secretary of the Scottish Chess Association.
