= Andrew Muir (chess player) =

Scottish chess player (born 1958)

Personal information
- Born: Andrew Joseph Muir; 17 October 1958 (age 67) Glasgow, Scotland

Chess career
- Country: Scotland
- Title: International Master (1990); International Correspondence Chess Grandmaster (1995)
- Peak rating: 2425 (January 1991)

Andrew Joseph Muir (born 17 October 1958) is a Scottish chess International Master (IM) (1990), Scottish Chess Championship winner (2007), Chess Olympiad individual gold medal winner (1998), International Correspondence Chess Grandmaster (GMC, 1995).

== Biography ==
Andrew Muir started seriously playing chess while studying at the University of Glasgow (1975–1979). He won the British Student Chess Championships in 1976 and was the best in Scottish Student Chess Championships in next year. Andrew Muir also won the International Chess Tournament Scottish Open in 1977, and in 1979 in Manchester won the International Chess Tournament Manchester Open. He was winner of the Glasgow Open International Chess Tournaments Glasgow Open (1982, 1984, 1991, 1995, 2008). In 2007, Andrew Muir became the winner of the Scottish Chess Championship. In 1990, he was awarded the FIDE International Master (IM) title.

Andrew Muir played for Scotland in the Chess Olympiads:

- In 1984, at second reserve board in the 26th Chess Olympiad in Thessaloniki (+4, =2, -1),
- In 1990, at fourth board in the 29th Chess Olympiad in Novi Sad (+3, =2, -4),
- In 1992, at first reserve board in the 30th Chess Olympiad in Manila (+2, =5, -1),
- In 1996, at second reserve board in the 32nd Chess Olympiad in Yerevan (+0, =2, -4),
- In 1998, at first reserve board in the 33rd Chess Olympiad in Elista (+5, =2, -0) and won individual gold medal.

Andrew Muir played for Scotland in the European Team Chess Championships:

- In 1989, at second board in the 9th European Team Chess Championship in Haifa (+1, =3, -4),
- In 1992, at second board in the 10th European Team Chess Championship in Debrecen (+1, =4, -3),
- In 1997, at second board in the 11th European Team Chess Championship in Pula (+1, =4, -4),
- In 1999, at first board in the 12th European Team Chess Championship in Batumi (+1, =2, -5),
- In 2001, at third board in the 13th European Team Chess Championship in León (+1, =0, -6),
- In 2003, at third board in the 14th European Team Chess Championship in Plovdiv (+3, =3, -1),
- In 2005, at third board in the 15th European Team Chess Championship in Gothenburg (+2, =2, -3),
- In 2007, at first board in the 16th European Team Chess Championship in Heraklion (+2, =0, -6),
- In 2009, at second board in the 17th European Team Chess Championship in Novi Sad (+0, =6, -3),
- In 2011, at third board in the 18th European Team Chess Championship in Porto Carras (+2, =2, -3),
- In 2013, at second board in the 19th European Team Chess Championship in Warsaw (+1, =5, -2),
- In 2015, at fourth board in the 20th European Team Chess Championship in Reykjavík (+0, =3, -4).

Andrew Muir played for Scotland in the World Student Team Chess Championship:

- In 1977, at first reserve board in the 22nd World Student Team Chess Championship in Mexico City (+2, =6, -3).

Andrew Muir played for Scotland in the World Youth U26 Team Chess Championships:

- In 1980, at first reserve board in the 2nd World Youth U26 Team Chess Championship in Mexico City (+2, =1, -4),
- In 1983, at first reserve board in the 4th World Youth U26 Team Chess Championship in Chicago (+5, =2, -2).

Andrew Muir played for Scotland in the Clare Benedict Cup:

- In 1979, at reserve board in the 23rd Clare Benedict Chess Cup in Cleveland (+2, =0, -2).

Andrew Muir active participated in correspondence chess tournaments between 1982 and 1995. In 1995, he was awarded the International Correspondence Chess Grandmaster (GMC) title.

In recent years, Andrew Muir has devoted much of his time to his actuary work and less frequently participates in chess tournaments.
