= Danny Kopec =

American-Canadian chess player (1954 – 2016)

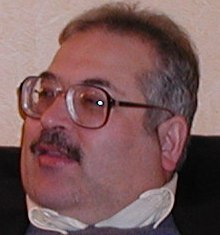
- Born: Daniel Kopec; February 28, 1954; Kfar Saba, Israel
- Died: June 12, 2016 (aged 62)
- Education: Dartmouth College (AB); University of Edinburgh (PhD)
- Chess career
- Country: United States; Canada (1983–1985)
- Title: International Master
- Peak rating: 2493 (December 1994)

Daniel Kopec (February 28, 1954 – June 12, 2016) was an American chess International Master, author, and computer science professor at Brooklyn College.

== Education ==
He graduated from Dartmouth College in the class of 1975. Kopec later received a PhD in Machine Intelligence from the University of Edinburgh in 1982 studying under Donald Michie.

== Chess ==
Kopec was Greater NY High School Champion at 14, and reached master at 17. Kopec won the Scottish Chess Championship in 1980 while pursuing his doctorate in Edinburgh. He lived in Canada for two years during the 1980s, and competed there with success, including second-equal in the 1984 Canadian Chess Championship. Kopec achieved the FIDE International Master title in 1985 and had several top three finishes (including second place ties) in the US Open.

He wrote numerous books on the subject of chess, produced eight chess instructional DVDs, and ran chess camps starting in 1994. Kopec also worked to promote his chess opening, the Kopec System (1.e4 c5 2.Nf3 d6 3.Bd3!?). With Ivan Bratko, he was the creator of the Bratko–Kopec Test, which was one of the de facto standard testing systems for chess-playing computer programs in the 1980s.

== Computer science ==
Kopec published notable academic pieces in the areas of artificial intelligence, machine error reduction, intelligent tutoring systems, and computer education.

== Death ==
Kopec died on June 12, 2016, from pancreatic cancer.

== Partial chess bibliography ==
- (1980) Best Games Of The Young Grandmasters, with Craig Pritchett (non-fiction chess), publisher Bell and Howell, London
- (1985) Master Chess: A Course in 21 Lessons (non-fiction chess)
- (1997) Practical Middlegame Techniques with Rudy Blumenfeld (non-fiction chess)
- (1998) Test, Evaluate, and Improve your Chess co-author Hal Terrie (non-fiction chess)
- (2002) Chess World Title Contenders and Their Styles co-author Craig Pritchett (non-fiction chess)
- (2003) Mastering the Sicilian (non-fiction chess)
- (2004) Winning the Won Game co-author Ľubomír Ftáčnik (non-fiction chess)
