= Craig Pritchett =

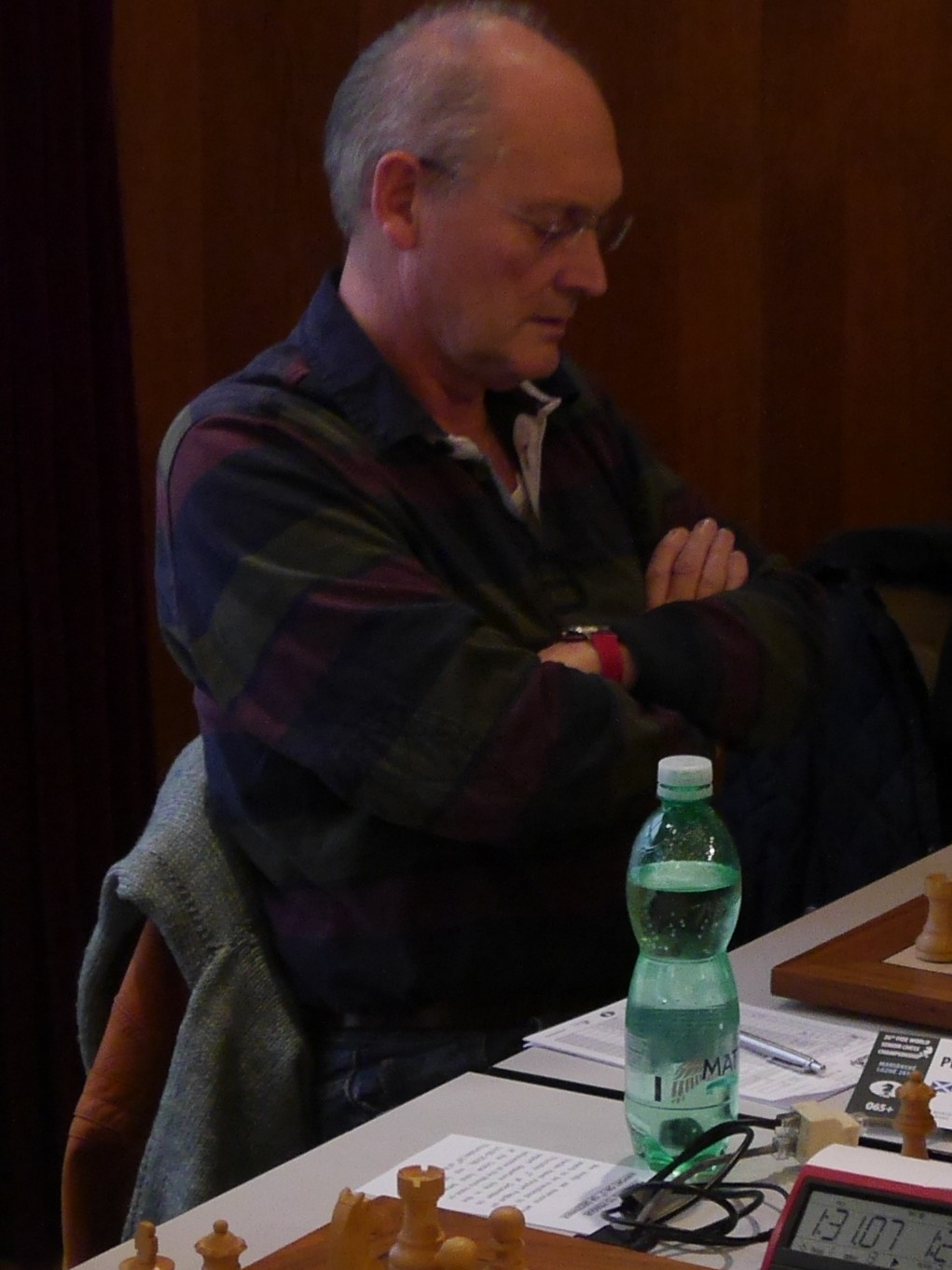
- Pritchett in 2016

Personal information
- Born: 15 January 1949 (age 77) Glasgow, Scotland

Chess career
- Country: Scotland
- Title: International Master (1976)
- Peak rating: 2425 (January 1977)

Craig W. Pritchett (born 15 January 1949 in Glasgow, Scotland) is a Scottish chess International Master who has written several chess books. He was educated at Allan Glen's School, where he was a prominent member of the chess club and represented the school in several tournaments. He has represented Scotland nine times in Chess Olympiads from 1966–1990. He has won the Scottish Chess Championships on two occasions (in 1977 and 2005), and played in two Zonal tournaments (1972 and 1975). He is also a chess coach.

== Team results for Scotland ==
Pritchett represented Scotland three times in Student Olympiads, from 1968–1970. Here are his detailed results, from olimpbase.org:

- Ybbs 1968, board 1, 3/10 (+1 =4 -5);
- Dresden 1969, board 2, 4.5/8 (+2 =5 -1);
- Haifa 1970, board 2, 2/9 (+1 =2 -6).

Pritchett represented Scotland nine times+Malta 1980 in Chess Olympiads, from 1966–1990. Here are his detailed results, from olimpase.org. His totals in 117 games are (+43 =46 -28), for 56.4 per cent.

- Havana 1966, board 4, 6.5/16 (+4 =5 -7);
- Siegen 1970, board 2, 8.5/14 (+6 =5 -3);
- Skopje 1972, board 2, 12.5/18 (+9 =7 -2);
- Nice 1974, board 1, 9/15 (+7 =4 -4);
- Haifa 1976, board 1, 4.5/11 (+2 =5 -4);
- Buenos Aires 1978, board 1, 8/13 (+5 =6 -2);
- Valletta 1980, board 1, 9/5 (+3 =4 -2)
- Lucerne 1982, board 1, 5/9 (+3 =4 -2);
- Dubai 1986, board 3, 5.5/11 (+3 =5 -3);
- Novi Sad 1990, board 3, 6.5/11 (+4 =5 -1).

== Scottish champion ==
Pritchett has been Scottish champion on at least two occasions. He became an International Master in 1976. Here are his detailed results:

- Bearsden 1972, 4.5/7, tied 1st-3rd places;
- Glasgow 1977, 5.5/7, 1st place;
- 1995, 5.5/9, 4th place;
- Oban 1996, 5/9.
- Oban 2005, finished 2nd to Jacob Aagaard, who was playing 'hors concours', so Pritchett was awarded the title

== Steady results in British Chess Championships ==
Pritchett has competed many times in the British Chess Championships, with generally solid results, qualifying twice to Zonal tournaments. Here are his detailed results:

- Bristol 1968, 6.5/11; tied 7-11th places;
- Blackpool 1971, 7/11, qualified for Zonal at Caorle 1972, where he struggled with just 6.5/17;
- Brighton 1972, 5.5/11;
- Eastbourne 1973, 6/11;
- Morecambe 1975, 6.5/11, tied 6-9th places, qualified for Zonal at Pula 1975, where he improved on his earlier showing with 7.5/14 for a tied 7-9th place, but did not advance to the Interzonal stage;
- Brighton 1977, 5.5/11;
- Brighton 1980, 5.5/11;
- Southport 1983, 6/11;
- Edinburgh 1985, 6.5/11;
- Southampton 1986, 5.5/11;
- Swansea 1987, 7/11, tied 6th place;
- Blackpool 1988, 4.5/10.

== Writings ==
Pritchett co-authored the book Best Games of the Young Grandmasters (Bell and Howell, London 1980) with Danny Kopec. Pritchett wrote Nimzo Indian 4.e3: Nimzowitsch, Hubner, and Taimanov Variations (Batsford 1980). Another book co-authored with Kopec is Chess World Contenders and Their Styles (2002). A more recent book is Starting Out: Sicilian Scheveningen, published in 2006; he wrote the first edition of this book in 1977. A forthcoming title from Pritchett in January 2008 is Play the English: A Complete Chess Opening Repertoire for White. Pritchett is the chess columnist for the Glasgow Herald.
