= Ľubomír Ftáčnik =

Czechoslovak chess grandmaster

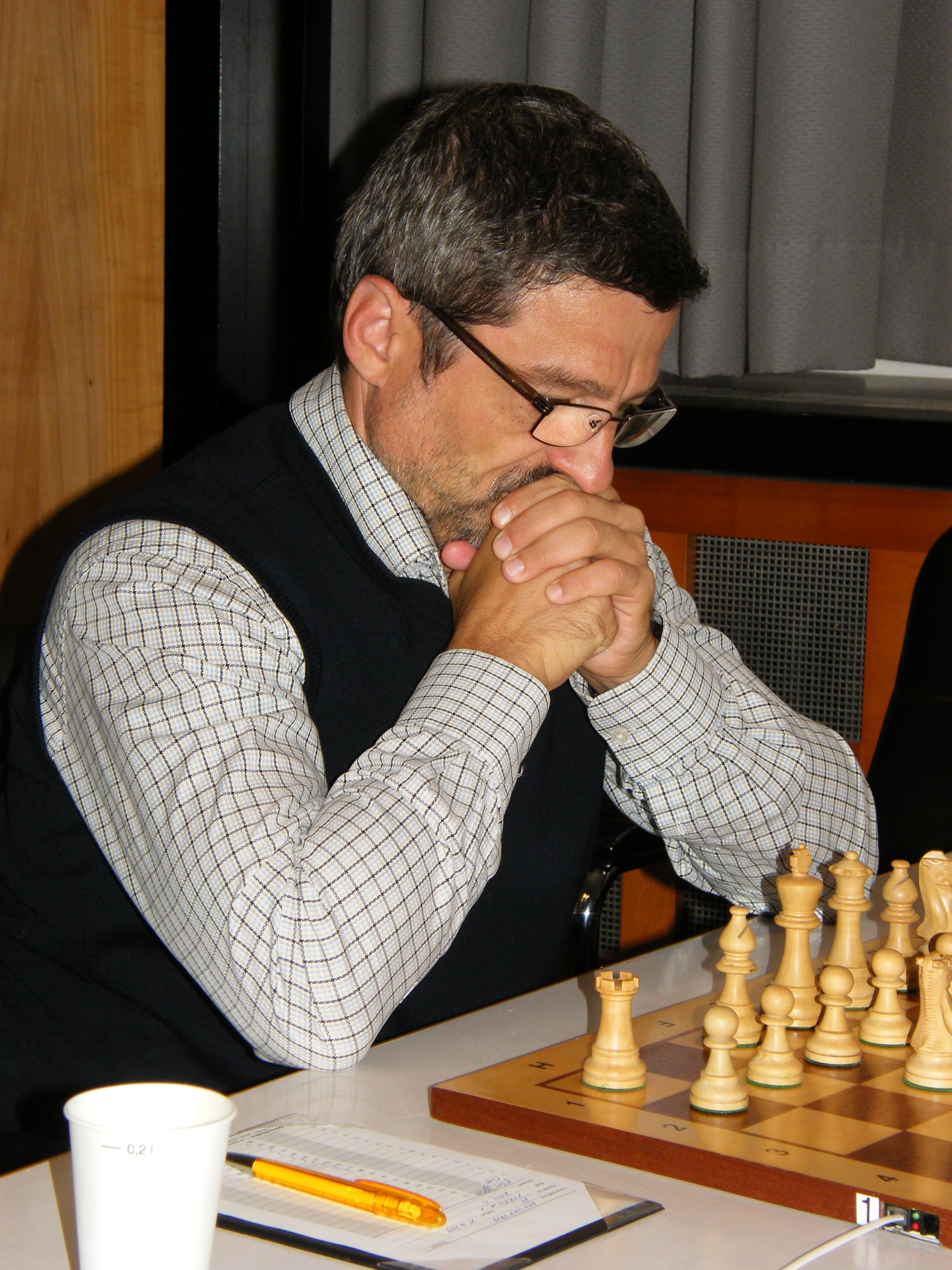
- Bundesliga, 2007/8

Personal information
- Born: October 30, 1957 (age 68) Bratislava, Czechoslovakia

Chess career
- Country: Slovakia
- Title: Grandmaster (1980)
- FIDE rating: 2408 (July 2026)
- Peak rating: 2618 (January 2001)
- Peak ranking: No. 15 (July 1984)

Ľubomír Ftáčnik (born October 30, 1957, in Bratislava) is a Slovak chess grandmaster and a former European Junior Champion.

== Chess career ==
He became European Junior Champion in 1976/77 and was awarded the International Master title shortly after. In 1980, he received the International Grandmaster title and this heralded the start of a successful playing career in national and international competitions.

In his native Czechoslovakia (now the Czech Republic and Slovakia) he became national champion in 1981, 1982, 1983 and 1985. In tournaments, there have been many outright first places, including Esbjerg 1982, Trnava 1983, Alltensteig 1987, Baden-Baden Open 1987, the international invitation tournament in Haninge (Sweden), Vienna 1990 and the Parkroyal Surfers (Australia) 2000. At Cienfuegos (Capablanca Memorial) 1980, Dortmund GM 1981 and Lugano Open 1988, he shared first place, and at Hradec Králové in 1981 he was runner-up. In 1987 he drew a match with Kiril Georgiev, the strong Bulgarian grandmaster.

At the Chess Olympiad, he has represented first Czechoslovakia and then Slovakia from 1980 onwards, missing out only in 1998. His major triumph occurred in 1982, when a 67.9% score helped the Czechoslovaks win the silver medal, very much against expectation. His performance with the black pieces overshadowed his results with white, an unusual outcome at such a high level.

Later he spent more time travelling abroad, including on occasional visits to Australia and the USA. In the US he attended chess summer camps, promoted his book (Winning The Won Game - 2004 Batsford/Chrysalis, co-authored with Danny Kopec) and played in tournaments. In 2006, he finished joint first at the Las Vegas National Open and followed up with an outright win at the South Carolina Open.

He also played the Amsterdam 2006 event and finished a creditable half point off the leaders in what was a very strong field (Tiviakov, Timman, Nijboer, Tukmakov among others).

Ftáčnik plays league chess in the German Bundesliga and has also made occasional appearances in the 4NCL.

== Personal life ==
Ftáčnik has a son, Martin, born 1985. His twin brother, Jan, is a physicist at the Physics Department of the Comenius University in Bratislava. His older brother, Milan Ftáčnik, was the mayor of Bratislava from 2011 to 2014.
