= Gerald Bonner (chess player) =

Scottish chess player

Personal information
- Born: 1 May 1941 (age 85) Glasgow, Scotland

Chess career
- Country: Scotland

Gerald Bonner (born 1 May 1941) is a Scottish chess player, three-times Scottish Chess Championship winner (1967, 1970, 1972).

== Biography ==
Gerald Bonner twice in row won Scottish Boys' Chess Championships (1957, 1958). He seven times won West of Scotland Chess Championships (1967, 1968, 1970, 1976, 1979, 1980, 1981). Also he won Glasgow Chess Club Championships seven times (1967, 1968, 1974, 1977, 1981, 1982, 1986). Gerald Bonner won Scottish Chess Championships three times: 1967, 1970, and 1972. He often participated in British Chess Championships: 1966–1969, 1971, 1975, and 1978.

Gerald Bonner played for Scotland in the Chess Olympiads:

- In 1964, at fourth board in the 16th Chess Olympiad in Tel Aviv (+2, =7, -7),
- In 1970, at fourth board in the 19th Chess Olympiad in Siegen (+4, =3, -5),
- In 1972, at third board in the 20th Chess Olympiad in Skopje (+8, =4, -5),
- In 1974, at first reserve board in the 21st Chess Olympiad in Nice (+3, =1, -2),
- In 1976, at second reserve board in the 22nd Chess Olympiad in Haifa (+2, =1, -3),
- In 1980, at second reserve board in the 24th Chess Olympiad in La Valletta (+2, =1, -2).

Gerald Bonner played for Scotland in the Clare Benedict Chess Cups:

- In 1979, at fourth board in the 23rd Clare Benedict Chess Cup in Cleveland (+1, =2, -1).

Gerald Bonner last participated in a rated chess event in 2017.
