= Artur Yusupov (chess player) =

Russian chess grandmaster (born 1960)

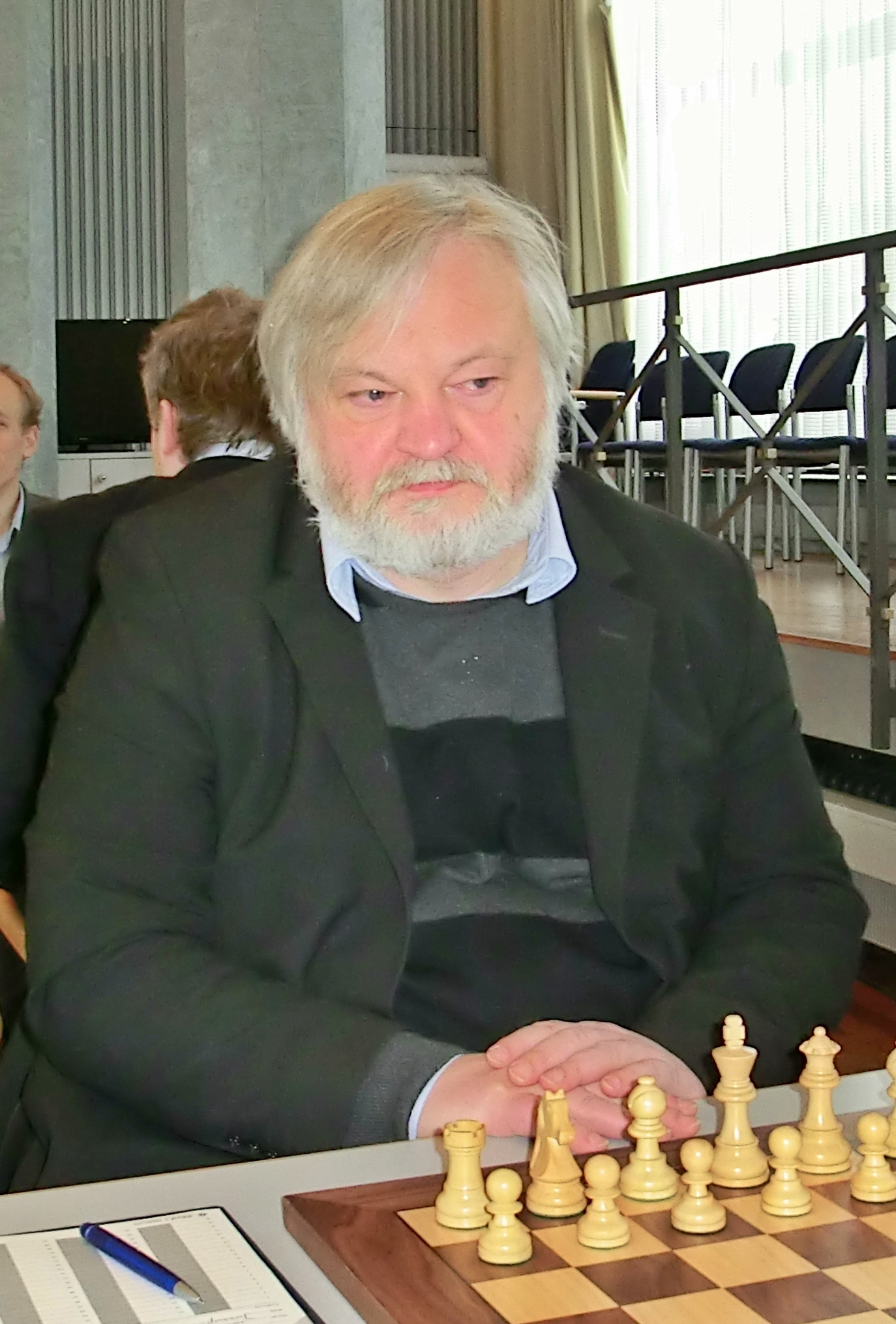
- Yusupov in 2013

Personal information
- Born: Artur Mayakovich Yusupov; February 13, 1960 (age 66) Moscow, Russian SFSR, Soviet Union

Chess career
- Country: Soviet Union (until 1991); Germany (since 1991)
- Title: Grandmaster (1980)
- FIDE rating: 2537 (October 2026)
- Peak rating: 2680 (July 1995)
- Peak ranking: No. 3 (July 1986)

Artur Mayakovich Yusupov (Russian: Арту́р Маякович Юсу́пов; German: Artur Majakowitsch Jussupow; born February 13, 1960) is a chess grandmaster and a chess writer. Born in Soviet Russia, he has lived in Germany since the early 1990s.

== Chess career ==
Yusupov learned to play chess at the age of six and trained at the Young Pioneers' Palace in Moscow. He won the World Junior Championship in 1977, which then automatically qualified him for the International Master title, with qualification as a grandmaster following in 1980. Yusupov finished in second place at his first USSR Championship in 1979 (behind Efim Geller). International tournament results in the next decade included first place at Esbjerg 1980, first at Yerevan 1982, equal fourth at Linares 1983, first at the Tunis Interzonal 1985, equal first at Montpellier Candidates 1985, and third at Linares 1988. He also won the 1986 Canadian Open Chess Championship.

By this time Yusupov was also chasing World Championship qualification, reaching the semi-final of the Candidates Tournament on three occasions: in 1986 (defeated by Andrei Sokolov), 1989 (defeated by Anatoly Karpov) and 1992 (defeated by Jan Timman).

In the early 1990s, he returned to his Moscow apartment one day and came upon burglars. During the struggle that broke out, he was shot and considers himself lucky to have survived. Soon after, he decided to move to Germany, which has remained his home.

There were further successes in tournaments; first at Hamburg 1991, first at Amsterdam 1994 and second at Horgen 1994 (a category 18 tournament). It was around this time that he could be regarded as playing his strongest chess, as was reflected by his peak Elo rating of 2680, recorded in July 1995. He went on to share first place at the 2002 World Open and won at the Basel Rapid 2005 and at Altenkirchen 2005, making him the German Champion.

"Purposefulness" and "strength of mind" are two of Yusupov's attributes, according to Alexei Suetin, who described him as "a player with a rational, positional style. He boasts high technical skill in the endgame and detailed knowledge of his customary opening systems. Least of all does he rely on inspiration; his every move is based on industrious study."

Throughout his playing career, Yusupov has been coached and mentored by Mark Dvoretsky, an International Master who was widely considered to be the world's leading chess trainer. Yusupov says Dvoretsky's influence has been instrumental in many of his biggest victories. The strong alliance and collaboration that developed led to them setting up the Dvoretsky–Yusupov Chess School. Students of the school have included strong grandmasters Peter Svidler, Sergei Movsesian and Vadim Zvjaginsev. In 2005, Yusupov was awarded the title of FIDE Senior Trainer.

Yusupov has also been a frequent contributor to Dvoretsky's books and has been a second and advisor to both Viswanathan Anand and Peter Leko during their world championship campaigns. He is a friend and training partner of the Russian GM, Sergey Dolmatov. Dolmatov was another protégé of Dvoretsky and, like Yusupov, became a Junior World Champion (in 1978).

== Legacy ==
In 1999, Yusupov published a book on the Petroff Defence. He was at the time an acknowledged leading authority on the opening, and his book widely considered the most encyclopaedic and comprehensive treatment thus far. He has also been a noted expert on the Lasker Defence of the Queen's Gambit Declined, bringing many new ideas to an opening over one hundred years old.

Yusupov is also known also for his contributions to the Colle–Zukertort System which is also sometimes referred to as the "Yusupov–Rubinstein System" due to, in part, Yusupov's notable games and successes in this system.

== Books ==
- Yusupov, Artur (2007). Build Up Your Chess with Artur Yusupov: The Fundamentals. Quality Chess. ISBN 978-1-906552-01-5.
- Yusupov, Artur (2008). Build Up Your Chess with Artur Yusupov: Beyond the Basics. Quality Chess. ISBN 978-1-906552-10-7.
- Dvoretsky, Mark; Yusupov, Artur (2006). Secrets of Chess Training. Olms. ISBN 978-3-283-00515-3.
- Mark Dvoretsky; Artur Yusupov (2007). Secrets of Opening Preparation. Olms. ISBN 978-3-283-00516-0.
- Mark Dvoretsky; Artur Yusupov (2008). Secrets of Endgame Technique. Olms. ISBN 978-3-283-00517-7.
- Mark Dvoretsky; Artur Yusupov (2008). Secrets of Positional Play. Olms. ISBN 978-3-283-00518-4.
- Mark Dvoretsky; Artur Yusupov (2009). Secrets of Creative Thinking. Olms. ISBN 978-3-283-00519-1.
- Artur Yusupov (2010) Boost your Chess 2 - Beyond the Basics. Quality Chess. ISBN 978-1-906552-43-5.
- Artur Yusupov (2011) Boost your Chess 3 - Mastery. Quality Chess. ISBN 978-1-906552-44-2.
- Artur Yusupov (2011) Chess Evolution 1. Quality Chess. ISBN 978-1-906552-45-9.
- Artur Yusupov (2012) Chess Evolution 2. Quality Chess. ISBN 978-1-906552-46-6.
- Artur Yusupov (2013) Chess Evolution 3. Quality Chess. ISBN 978-1-906552-47-3.

== Notable games ==
- Mark Taimanov vs. Artur Yusupov, USSR 1982; English Symmetrical, Anti-Benoni, 0–1. Black structures his attack to undermine White's pawn centre and realise the full potential of his light-squared bishop.
- Vassily Ivanchuk vs. Artur Yusupov, 1991–93 Candidates Tournament, quarterfinals, game 9, Brussels 1991; King's Indian Defense, Fianchetto Variation (ECO E67), 0–1. In 1996, a jury of grandmasters and readers, voting in the Chess Informant, chose this game as the best game played in 1966–1996.
