= George Page (chess player) =

Scottish chess player

Personal information
- Born: 27 October 1890 Glasgow, Scotland
- Died: 26 June 1953 (aged 62) Edinburgh, Scotland

Chess career
- Country: United Kingdom

George Page ISO (27 October 1890 – 26 June 1953) was a Scottish chess player, Scottish Chess Championship winner (1925).

== Biography ==
George Page was one of the strongest chess players in Scotland in the 1920-1930s. He was champion of the Edinburgh Chess Club and the Civil Service Chess Club (Edinburgh) many times, including the consecutive years 1933-1941. He was also with Edinburgh Chess Club that won the Richardson Cup from 1920 to 1924. He won the Scottish Chess Championship in 1925. From 1925 onwards, George Page would help the Civil Service Chess Club in their matches, and he was a member of their team that won the Richardson Cup in 1939.

George Page played for Scotland in the Chess Olympiads:

- In 1933, at second board in the 5th Chess Olympiad in Folkestone (+1, =1, -12),
- In 1937, at third board in the 7th Chess Olympiad in Stockholm (+1, =2, -9).

George Page edited a chess column in the Weekly Scotsman from 1926 to 1939. In 1952, he was made a Companion of the Imperial Service Order, an award given to retiring staff of the Civil Service who had given long and meritorious service.
