= Quality Chess =

Scottish chess publishing company

- Founded: 2004; 22 years ago
- Founder: Ari Ziegler, Jacob Aagaard and John Shaw
- Country of origin: United Kingdom
- Headquarters location: Glasgow, Scotland
- Distribution: Simon & Schuster (US)
- Publication types: Books
- Nonfiction topics: Chess
- Official website: www.qualitychess.co.uk

Quality Chess UK Ltd (known as Quality Chess) is a chess publishing company, founded in 2004 by International Master Ari Ziegler, Grandmaster Jacob Aagaard and Grandmaster John Shaw. The company is based in Glasgow.

In 2024 it was announced that Quality Chess bought New in Chess and Popular Chess. The New in Chess website says that Quality, Everyman/Popular and New in Chess merged, and the print books of all three are sold through the New in Chess site. Chess.com apparently has the digital rights to the books, and sells video versions on their site.

The company focuses on quality of publications rather than quantity of books. In 2005, the book Learn from the Legends: Chess Champions at Their Best by Grandmaster Mihail Marin won the ChessCafe.com "Book of the Year" award. In 2007 San Luis 2005: How Chess Found Its Champion by Alik Gershon and Igor Nor won the English Chess Federation's "Book of the Year 2007" award. Aagaard's Attacking Manual 1 & 2 won the 2010 English Chess Federation book of the year prize.

== Published books ==
- Marin, Mihail (2004). Learn from the Legends: Chess Champions at Their Best. Quality Chess. ISBN 91-975243-2-8.
- Rogozenko, Dorian (2005). Sveshnikov Reloaded. Quality Chess. ISBN 978-91-975243-5-3;
- Aagaard, Jacob (2006). Practical Chess Defence. Quality Chess. ISBN 978-91-975244-4-5.
- Gershon, Alik; Nor, Igor (2006). San Luis 2005: How Chess Found Its Champion. Quality Chess. ISBN 91-976005-2-0.
- Marin, Mihail (2007). A Spanish Opening Repertoire for Black. Quality Chess. ISBN 91-976005-0-4.
- Marin, Mihail (2007). Beating the Open Games. Quality Chess. ISBN 91-976004-3-1.
- Vigorito, David (2007). Challenging the Nimzo-Indian. Quality Chess. ISBN 978-91-976005-5-2.
- Vigorito, David (2007). Play the Semi-Slav. Quality Chess. ISBN 91-85779-01-6.
- Nimzowitsch, Aron (2007). My System, ISBN 978-1-907982-14-9.
- Aagaard, Jacob (2008). The Attacking Manual: Basic Principles. Quality Chess. ISBN 978-91-976004-0-8.
- Marin, Mihail; Garrett, Yuri (2009). Reggio Emilia 2007/2008. Quality Chess. ISBN 978-1-906552-32-9.
- Karolyi, Tibor; Aplin, Nick (2009). Genius in the Background. Quality Chess. ISBN 978-1-906552-37-4.
- Brunello, Sabino (2009). Attacking the Spanish. Quality Chess. ISBN 978-1-906552-1-76.
- Aagaard, Jacob (2010).The Attacking Manual 2: Technique and Praxis. Quality Chess. ISBN 978-91-976004-1-5.
- Boris Avrukh (2010) Grandmaster Repertoire 2 - 1.d4 volume 2. Quality Chess. ISBN 978-1-906552-33-6.
- Boris Alterman (2010) The Alterman Gambit - White Gambits. Quality Chess. Guide ISBN 978-1-906552-53-4.
- Milos Pavlovic (2010) The Cutting Edge 1 - The Open Sicilian. Quality Chess. 1 ISBN 978-1-906552-57-2.
- Alexey Suetin (2010) Soviet Chess Strategy. Quality Chess. ISBN 978-1-906552-20-6.
- Lars Schandorff(2010) Grandmaster Repertoire 7 - The Caro-Kann. Quality Chess. ISBN 978-1-906552-56-5.
- John Shaw (2010) The Quality Chess Puzzle Book. Quality Chess. ISBN 978-1906552121.
- Ľubomír Ftáčnik (2010) Grandmaster Repertoire 6 - The Sicilian Defence. Quality Chess. ISBN 978-1-906552-08-4.
- Artur Yusupov (2010) Boost your Chess 2 - Beyond the Basics. Quality Chess. ISBN 978-1-906552-43-5.
- Mihail Marin (2010) Grandmaster Repertoire 4 - The English Opening vol. 2. Quality Chess. ISBN 978-1-906552-38-1.
- Mihail Marin (2010) Grandmaster Repertoire 5 - The English Opening vol. 3. Quality Chess. ISBN 978-1-906552-59-6.
- Christian Bauer (2010) Play the Scandinavian. Quality Chess. ISBN 978-1-906552-55-8.
- Artur Yusupov (2011) Boost your Chess 3 - Mastery. Quality Chess. ISBN 978-1-906552-44-2.
- Milos Pavlovic (2011) The Cutting Edge 2 - Sicilian Najdorf 6.Be3. Quality Chess. ISBN 978-1-906552-58-9.
- Jacob Aagaard & John Shaw (editors) (2011) Experts on the Anti-Sicilian. Quality Chess. ISBN 978-1-906552-80-0.
- Vladimir Popov (2011) Chess Lessons. Quality Chess. ISBN 978-1-906552-82-4.
- Tibor Károlyi (2011) Karpov's Strategic Wins 2 - The Prime Years. Quality Chess. ISBN 978-1-906552-42-8.
- Tibor Károlyi (2011) Karpov's Strategic Wins 1 - The Making of a Champion. Quality Chess. ISBN 978-1-906552-41-1.
- Arkadij Naiditsch (2011) Chess Evolution. Quality Chess. ISBN 978-1-907982-06-4.
- Boris Avrukh (2011) Grandmaster Repertoire 8 - The Grunfeld Defence . Quality Chess. ISBN 978-1-906552-75-6.
- Vasilios Kotronias (2011) The Grandmaster Battle Manual. Quality Chess. ISBN 978-1-906552-52-7.
- Boris Avrukh (2011) Grandmaster Repertoire 9 - The Grunfeld Defence Volume Two. Quality Chess. ISBN 978-1-907982-00-2.
- Glenn Flear (2011) Tactimania. Quality Chess. ISBN 978-1-906552-98-5.
- Artur Yusupov (2011) Chess Evolution 1. Quality Chess. ISBN 978-1-906552-45-9.
- Jacob Aagaard & John Shaw (editors) (2011) Grandmaster vs Amateur. Quality Chess. ISBN 978-1-906552-84-8.
- Boris Alterman (2011) The Alterman Gambit Guide - Black Gambits. Quality Chess. 1 ISBN 978-1-906552-54-1.
- Lev Psakhis (2011) Advanced Chess Tactics. Quality Chess. ISBN 978-1-907982-04-0.
- Nikolaos Ntirlis and Jacob Aagaard (2011) Grandmaster Repertoire 10 - The Tarrasch Defence. Quality Chess. ISBN 978-1-906552-91-6.
- Martin Weteschnik (2012) Chess Tactics from Scratch. Quality Chess. ISBN 978-1-907982-02-6.
- Mihai Șubă (2012) Positional Chess Sacrifices. Quality Chess. ISBN 978-1-906552-86-2.
- Boris Alterman (2012) Alterman Gambit Guide - Black Gambits 2. Quality Chess. ISBN 978-1-906552-96-1.
- Artur Yusupov (2012) Chess Evolution 2. Quality Chess. ISBN 978-1-906552-46-6.
- Jacob Aagaard (2012) Grandmaster Preparation - Calculation. Quality Chess. ISBN 978-1-907982-30-9.
- Marc Esserman (2012) Mayhem in the Morra. Quality Chess. ISBN 978-1-907982-20-0.
- Lars Schandorff (2012) Playing 1.d4 - The Queen's Gambit. Quality Chess. ISBN 978-1-907982-15-6.
- Lars Schandorff (2012) Playing 1.d4 - The Indian Defences. Quality Chess. ISBN 978-1-907982-17-0.
- Judit Polgár (2012) How I Beat Fischer's Record (hardcover) - Judit Polgar Teaches Chess 1. Quality Chess. ISBN 978-1-907982-19-4.
- Boris Avrukh (2012) Grandmaster Repertoire 11 - Beating 1.d4 Sidelines. Quality Chess. ISBN 978-1-907982-12-5.
- Jacob Aagaard (2012) Grandmaster Preparation - Positional Play. Quality Chess. ISBN 978-1-907982-26-2.
- Artur Yusupov (2013) Chess Evolution 3. Quality Chess. ISBN 978-1-906552-47-3.
- Victor Mikhalevski (2013) Grandmaster Repertoire 13 - The Open Spanish. Quality Chess. ISBN 978-1-907982-44-6.
- Marian Petrov (2013) Grandmaster Repertoire 12 - The Modern Benoni. Quality Chess. ISBN 978-1-907982-59-0.
- Peter Romanovsky (2013) Soviet Middlegame Technique. Quality Chess. ISBN 978-1-907982-48-4.
- Jacob Aagaard (2013) Grandmaster Preparation - Strategic Play. Quality Chess. ISBN 978-1-907982-28-6.
- John Shaw (2013) The King's Gambit. Quality Chess. ISBN 978-1-906552-71-8.
- Vasilios Kotronias (2013) Kotronias on the King's Indian Fianchetto Systems. Quality Chess. ISBN 978-1-906552-50-3.
- Richard Pert (2013) Playing the Trompowsky. Quality Chess. ISBN 978-1-907982-75-0.
- Axel Smith (2013) Pump Up Your Rating. Quality Chess. ISBN 978-1-907982-73-6.
- Emanuel Berg (2013) Grandmaster Repertoire 14 - The French Defence Volume One. Quality Chess. ISBN 978-1-907982-40-8
- Jacob Aagaard and Nikolaos Ntirlis (2013) Playing the French. Quality Chess. ISBN 978-1-907982-36-1.
- Judit Polgár (2013) From GM to Top Ten. Quality Chess. ISBN 978-1-907982-51-4.
- Emanuel Berg (2013) Grandmaster Repertoire 15 - The French Defence Volume Two. Quality Chess. ISBN 978-1-907982-42-2.
- Vasilios Kotronias and Sotiris Logothetis (2013) Carlsen's Assault on the Throne. Quality Chess. ISBN 978-1-906552-22-0.
- Boris Avrukh (2014) Grandmaster Repertoire 17 - The Classical Slav. Quality Chess. ISBN 978-1-907982-38-5 .
- Tibor Károlyi (2014) Mikhail Tal's Best Games 1 - The Magic of Youth. Quality Chess. ISBN 978-1-907982-77-4.
- Daniel Gormally (2014) Mating the Castled King. Quality Chess. ISBN 978-1-907982-71-2.
- Jacob Aagaard (2014) Grandmaster Preparation - Attack and Defence. Quality Chess. ISBN 978-1-907982-69-9.
- Jacob Aagaard (2014) Grandmaster Preparation - Endgame Play. Quality Chess. ISBN 978-1-907982-32-3.
- Vasilios Kotronias (2014) Grandmaster Repertoire 18 - The Sicilian Sveshnikov. Quality Chess. ISBN 978-1-907982-92-7.
- Parimarjan Negi (2014) Grandmaster Repertoire - 1.e4 vs The French, Caro-Kann and Philidor. Quality Chess. ISBN 978-1-906552-06-0.
- Esben Lund (2014) The Secret Life of Bad Bishops. Quality Chess. ISBN 978-1-906552-19-0.
- Judit Polgár (2014) A Game of Queens. Quality Chess. ISBN 978-1-907982-52-1.
- Tiger Hillarp Persson (2014) The Modern Tiger. Quality Chess. ISBN 978-1-907982-83-5.
- Ilya Maizelis (2014) The Soviet Chess Primer. Quality Chess. ISBN 978-1-907982-99-6.
