= Roderick McIntosh McKay =

Scottish chess player

Personal information
- Born: 11 February 1952 (age 74) Glasgow, Scotland

Chess career
- Country: Scotland
- Title: International Master (1986)
- Peak rating: 2410 (January 1989)

Roderick McIntosh McKay (born 11 February 1952) is a Scottish chess player, International Master (IM, 1986), eight-times Scottish Chess Championship winner (1971, 1974, 1976, 1979, 1982, 1985, 1988, 2013).

== Biography ==
In July 1968, at 16 years of age, Roderick McIntosh McKay won 2nd place in the Scottish Chess Championship. In 1969 he won Scottish Junior International Chess Tournament and in Stockholm played in World Junior Chess Championship where ranked 11th.

Roderick McIntosh McKay won Scottish Chess Championships seven times: 1971 (shared), 1974, 1976, 1979, 1982, 1985 (shared), 1988.

Roderick McIntosh McKay played for Scotland in the Chess Olympiads:

- In 1968, at second reserve board in the 18th Chess Olympiad in Lugano (+9, =5, -2).
- In 1970, at third board in the 19th Chess Olympiad in Siegen (+6, =3, -6),
- In 1974, at second board in the 21st Chess Olympiad in Nice (+4, =10, -5),
- In 1982, at first board in the 25th Chess Olympiad in Lucerne (+4, =4, -2),
- In 2014, at reserve board in the 41st Chess Olympiad in Tromsø (+4, =1, -3).

Roderick McIntosh McKay played for Scotland in the World Student Team Chess Championships:

- In 1968, at fourth board in the 15th World Student Team Chess Championship in Ybbs (+8, =0, -5),
- In 1969, at first board in the 16th World Student Team Chess Championship in Dresden (+0, =2, -2),
- In 1972, at first board in the 19th World Student Team Chess Championship in Graz (+3, =5, -3).

In 1986, Roderick McIntosh McKay was awarded the FIDE International Master (IM) title.
