= William Fairhurst =

English chess player and bridge designer (1903–1982)

Fairhurst age 34

William Albert Fairhurst CBE (21 August 1903 – 13 March 1982) was an English bridge designer and international chess master. He was highly accomplished in both disciplines and for many years successfully divided his time between two careers. He was appointed a CBE for his services to engineering, and in chess he was several times champion of Scotland, gaining the title of International Master in 1951.

== Chess player ==
Born in Alderley Edge, Cheshire, Fairhurst was thirteen when he taught himself to play chess from a collection of books at the family home. During this developmental stage, he was inspired by the teachings of Siegbert Tarrasch and consequently his playing style was based, for the most part, on dogmatic strategic concepts. By eighteen, he was Cheshire County Champion and a little later, moved to Lancashire, where he established a reputation as one of the leading players in the North of England. As an amateur, he had little opportunity to play in international tournaments, but he did compete at Scarborough in 1927, finishing second, tied with Frederick Yates, ahead of several recognised masters including Efim Bogoljubov, Sir George Thomas and Victor Buerger. He defeated not only the hugely experienced Bogoljubov, but also the first-prize winner, Edgard Colle. It was around this time, in his twenties, that he edited a well-respected games section in the magazine Chess Amateur.

In 1931, he went to live in Scotland and laid the foundations for a chess boom north of the border, winning the Scottish championship a record eleven times between 1932 and 1962. A gifted blindfold player, he held a twelve-board simultaneous blindfold exhibition in 1932 at the Glasgow Polytechnic Club, winning nine games and drawing three. A year later, he drew a six-game match with the then Austrian master Erich Eliskases, a player of noted strength and very much a rising star in world chess. In 1937, Fairhurst won a fiercely contested British Championship in Blackpool.

Playing team chess, he represented Great Britain many times, in a series of matches with Czechoslovakia, the Netherlands and Russia, held between 1937 and 1954. Playing board one, he spearheaded the Scottish Chess Olympiad team on six occasions between 1933 and 1968; his victims included the Danish champion and future world championship contender Bent Larsen, who was close to his peak. In 1947, he played in a radio match with Australia and at the end of the year, achieved a creditable fifth place at the Hastings International Chess Congress of 1947/48. His next performance at Hastings was similarly praiseworthy, finishing the 1948/49 event in a tie for fourth place.

In 1950, chess organisers took advantage of the fact that the leading players of England, Scotland, Canada, New Zealand and South Africa were all gathered in Britain at the same time. An impromptu first (unofficial) Commonwealth Chess Championship was arranged and held in Oxford. Fairhurst won the event, ahead of Daniel Yanofsky, Robert Wade and Wolfgang Heidenfeld, among others. He later lost a match to Wade in Glasgow in 1953.

As the best of his playing days drew to a close, Fairhurst continued to give generously of his time and money, for the furtherance of Scottish Chess. He was made President of the Scottish Chess Association (SCA) from 1956 and forged new links with the British Chess Federation. At the end of his allotted tenure, he took control of the SCA, appointed himself President and retained the right to choose who joined him on the board. For a while, this was an improvement over the muddled state that the SCA had previously endured. Later however, his influence became overbearing and following a controversy about team selection for the Lugano 1968 Olympiad, where he tried to block the inclusion of a player, he was deposed and asked to appoint a successor.

His business interests caused him to move to New Zealand around 1970. While there, he played in the New Zealand Chess Championship and decided that he liked the country so much, it would make an ideal venue for his retirement. He competed at the Nice 1974 Olympiad for his new adopted country, playing board one and registering a 40% score; an outstanding result for a seventy-year-old.

== Bridge designer ==
After building a career and reputation for himself in civil and structural engineering, Fairhurst became the senior partner in his own engineering consultancy, W. A. Fairhurst and Partners. Specialising in bridge design, the largest and most prestigious of his projects was the design of the new Tay Road Bridge, which crosses the Tay estuary and links north-east Fife with the city of Dundee. It was, at the time, the longest river crossing in Europe, measuring approximately 1.4 miles. Costing £6 million, the bridge was opened in 1966 at a ceremony performed by the Queen Mother. Other notable projects included the Kingston Bridge, Glasgow (1970) and the Queen Elizabeth II Metro Bridge (1980) in Newcastle-upon-Tyne. There were many other bridges in Scotland and also in New Zealand, where he was lured to advise on a particularly difficult structure in the early 1970s, and where he made a home for his retirement.

For his engineering achievements, he received a doctorate, and through The Queen's honours list, a CBE. At the pinnacle of his profession, Fairhurst was honoured with the Presidency of the Scottish Branch of the Institution of Structural Engineers. In his time, he was the author of the text Arch Design Simplified and a member of the Royal Fine Art Commission for Scotland.

His engineering company continues to thrive today, working out of 15 principal offices and employing 500 staff. Today it is one of the largest private consultancy companies in the UK, trading since 1 January 2012 under the name Fairhurst.
