= Colin McNab =

Scottish chess grandmaster (born 1961)

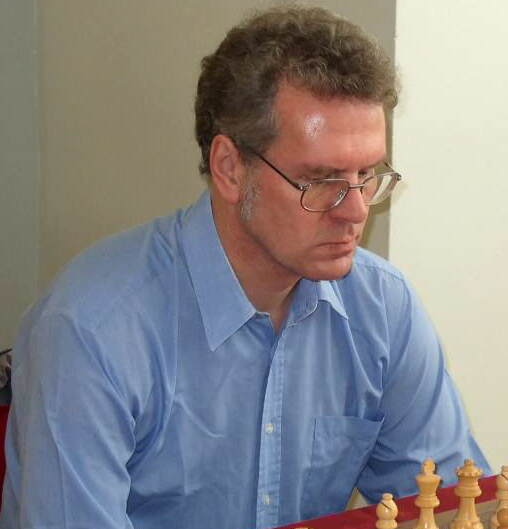
- McNab in 2008

Personal information
- Born: Colin Anderson McNab; 3 February 1961 (age 65) Dundee, Scotland

Chess career
- Country: Scotland
- Title: FIDE Grandmaster (1992); ICCF International Master (1993); International Solving Master (2007)
- FIDE rating: 2402 (July 2026)
- Peak rating: 2500 (January 1998)

Colin Anderson McNab (born 3 February 1961) is a Scottish chess player. He is Scotland's second player to be awarded the title of Grandmaster (GM), fulfilling its requirements in 1992 just after Paul Motwani. After achieving his three norms, he strained to get his rating up to the required 2500 level, and is possibly unique among Grandmasters in only achieving a published rating of 2500 some six years after being awarded the title. The FIDE regulations in force at the time stated that an 'intermediate' rating at any stage during an event would suffice, and that ratings between 2498.5 and 2500 would be rounded up, which is indeed what happened in 1992. He is also an International Master of correspondence chess since 1993 and International Master of chess problem solving since 2007.

McNab played for Scotland in eighteen Chess Olympiads between 1980 and 2016, and won the Scottish Chess Championship in 1983, 1991, 1993 and 1995. He was also the Commonwealth champion in 1992. In 2012 and 2013, McNab won the British Problem Solving Championship.

His opening repertoire is noted for its seemingly quiet fianchetto systems, and he has written a book on the fianchetto variation of the King's Indian Defence, and co-authored a book about the Pirc Defence with John Nunn. He is renowned as an expert on the endgame and has written a regular column for Scottish Chess magazine for a number of years.

McNab is a doctor of Mathematics, having studied for a DPhil at the University of Oxford under the supervision of Peter Neumann.

== Books ==
- McNab, Colin (1997). The Fianchetto King's Indian. Batsford. ISBN 978-0713480115.
- Nunn, John; McNab, Colin (1998). The Ultimate Pirc. Batsford. ISBN 978-0713482218.

== Notable games ==
- Garry Kasparov vs Colin Anderson McNab, Cagnes sur mer 1977, Modern Defense: Suttles Variation (B06), 1/2-1/2
- John Nunn vs Colin Anderson McNab, Marbella zt A 1982, Pirc Defense: Classical Variation (B08), 0-1
- Colin Anderson McNab vs Murray Chandler, Bath (England) 1987, English Opening: King's English (A28), 1-0
- Colin Anderson McNab vs Mika Karttunen, EU Union Ch 2006, Formation: King's Indian Attack (A07), 1-0
