= Scottish Chess Championship =

The Scottish Chess Championship is organised by Chess Scotland, formerly the Scottish Chess Association. It has been running since 1884, and nowadays takes the form of a nine-round tournament played over two weekends and the week in between. Auxiliary tournaments, such as grading-limited sections and a senior championship take place over the first seven days and there is a Weekend Congress on the second weekend.

Originally, the championship was by invitation only and could only be won by players who would be eligible to compete internationally for Scotland, but sometimes a titled player of another nationality was invited to compete in order to make title norms more likely.

In 2008 the Championship was replaced by an international open. The Scottish Champion being determined by the highest finishing Scottish player. The 2009 tournament being held in Edinburgh attracted nine Grandmasters. The 2010 event took place in Hamilton with the 2011 event back in Edinburgh. The 2014 Championships was incorporated into the Commonwealth Chess Championships which was held in Glasgow. In 2015 the Event was held in Edinburgh and the 2016 event will be back In Glasgow

The current Tournament Arbiters are IA Alex McFarlane and IA Andy Howie.

== Notable Winners ==
Recent notable winners include Ketevan Arakhamia-Grant in 2003 – the first woman player to win the Scottish Championship, and Jonathan Rowson, who became the first Scottish player to clinch the Grandmaster title on home soil in 1999, and did the Scottish / British double in 2004. In 2013 Roddy McKay won the title some 39 years after first winning his first title in 1974. In 2018 Murad Abdulla became the youngest Double winner of the title.

== Winners ==
- 1884 - John Crum
- 1885 - Daniel Yarnton Mills
- 1886 - Georges Emile Barbier
- 1887 - Daniel Yarnton Mills
- 1888 - George Henry Mackenzie
- 1889 - James Marshall
- 1890 - William Neish Walker
- 1891 - John D. Chambers
- 1892 - Daniel Yarnton Mills
- 1893 - William Neish Walker
- 1894 - Sheriff Walter Cook Spens
- 1895 - Daniel Yarnton Mills
- 1896 - Daniel Yarnton Mills
- 1897 - Daniel Yarnton Mills
- 1898 - George Brunton Fraser
- 1899 - Daniel Yarnton Mills
- 1900 - Daniel Yarnton Mills
- 1901 - Dr. Ronald Cadell Macdonald
- 1902 - E Macdonald
- 1903 - James Borthwick
- 1904 - Dr. Ronald Cadell Macdonald
- 1905 - Dr. Ronald Cadell Macdonald
- 1906 - Dr. Ronald Cadell Macdonald
- 1907 - William Gibson
- 1908 - Arthur John Mackenzie
- 1909 - Arthur John Mackenzie
- 1910 - George W Richmond
- 1911 - JA McKee
- 1912 - William Gibson
- 1913 - Arthur John Mackenzie
- 1914 - William Gibson
- 1915 - C Wardhaugh
- 1916 to 1919 - No Championship Held
- 1920 - P Wenman
- 1921 - William Gibson
- 1922 - William Gibson
- 1923 - William Gibson
- 1924 - C Heath
- 1925 - George Page
- 1926 - JA McKee
- 1927 - Dr. Ronald Cadell Macdonald
- 1928 - Dr. Ronald Cadell Macdonald
- 1929 - William Gibson
- 1930 - William Gibson
- 1931 - William Gibson
- 1932 - William Fairhurst
- 1933 - William Fairhurst
- 1934 - William Fairhurst
- 1935 - James Macrae Aitken
- 1936 - William Fairhurst
- 1937 - William Fairhurst
- 1938 - William Fairhurst
- 1939 - Max Pavey
- 1940 to 1945 - No Championship Held
- 1946 - William Fairhurst
- 1947 - William Fairhurst
- 1948 - William Fairhurst
- 1949 - William Fairhurst
- 1950 - PB Anderson
- 1951 - Alexander Aird Thomson
- 1952 - James Macrae Aitken
- 1953 - James Macrae Aitken
- 1954 - PB Anderson
- 1955 - James Macrae Aitken
- 1956 - James Macrae Aitken
- 1957 - James Macrae Aitken
- 1958 - James Macrae Aitken
- 1959 - Peter Coast
- 1960 - James Macrae Aitken
- 1961 - James Macrae Aitken
- 1962 - William Fairhurst
- 1963 - Michael Fallone
- 1964 - Alexander Munro Davie
- 1965 - James Macrae Aitken, Peter Michael Jamieson
- 1966 - Alexander Munro Davie
- 1967 - Gerald Bonner
- 1968 - David Levy
- 1969 - Alexander Munro Davie
- 1970 - Gerald Bonner
- 1971 - E Holt, RM McKay
- 1972 - Gerald Bonner
- 1973 - Peter Michael Jamieson
- 1974 - RM McKay
- 1975 - DNL Levy, S Swanson
- 1976 - RM McKay
- 1977 - CW Pritchett
- 1978 - PA Motwani
- 1979 - RM McKay
- 1980 - Danny Kopec
- 1981 - G Morrison
- 1982 - RM McKay
- 1983 - CA McNab
- 1984 - CSM Thomson
- 1985 - ML Condie, RM McKay
- 1986 - Paul Motwani
- 1987 - Paul Motwani
- 1988 - RM McKay
- 1989 - ML Condie
- 1990 - SR Mannion
- 1991 - Colin McNab
- 1992 - Paul Motwani
- 1993 - Colin McNab, Paul Motwani
- 1994 - Jonathan Parker
- 1995 - SR Mannion, Colin McNab, John K Shaw
- 1996 - DM Bryson
- 1997 - DM Bryson
- 1998 - John K Shaw
- 1999 - Jonathan Rowson
- 2000 - AJ Norris, John K Shaw
- 2001 - Jonathan Rowson
- 2002 - Paul Motwani
- 2003 - Paul Motwani, Ketevan Arakhamia-Grant
- 2004 - Jonathan Rowson
- 2005 - Craig Pritchett
- 2006 - Jonathan Grant
- 2007 - Andrew Muir
- 2008 - Alan Tate
- 2009 - Iain Gourlay (Scottish Champion 6.5), GM S. Arun Prasad (Open Winner 7.5)
- 2010 - Andrew Greet
- 2011 - Ketevan Arakhamia-Grant
- 2012 - Jacob Aagaard
- 2013 - RM McKay
- 2014 - Alan Tate (chess player)
- 2015 - Neil Berry (Scottish Champion 7), GM Korneev, Oleg (Open Winner 7.5)
- 2016 - Ketevan Arakhamia-Grant (Scottish Champion 6), Matthew Turner (Open Winner 7.5)
- 2017 - Murad Abdulla (Scottish Champion 6.5), Andrei Maksimenko (Open Winner 7.5)
- 2018 - Murad Abdulla (Scottish Champion & Open Winner 8)
- 2019 - Colin McNab (Scottish Champion 6.5), Matthew Turner (Scottish Champion 7), Ritvars Reimanis (Open Winner 7)
- 2020/21 - Did not take place due to pandemic
- 2022 - Murad Abdulla (Scottish Champion 6.5)
- 2023 - Edwin Spencer (Scottish Champion 4)
- 2024 - Andrew Greet (Scottish Champion 7)
- 2025 - Andrew Greet (Scottish Champion 7.5), Johan-Sebastian Christiansen (Open winner 9)
- 2026 - Andrew Greet (Scottish Champion 7.5), Johan-Sebastian Christiansen (Open winner 8.5)

== See also ==
- British Chess Championship
