= John K. Shaw =

Scottish chess grandmaster (born 1968)

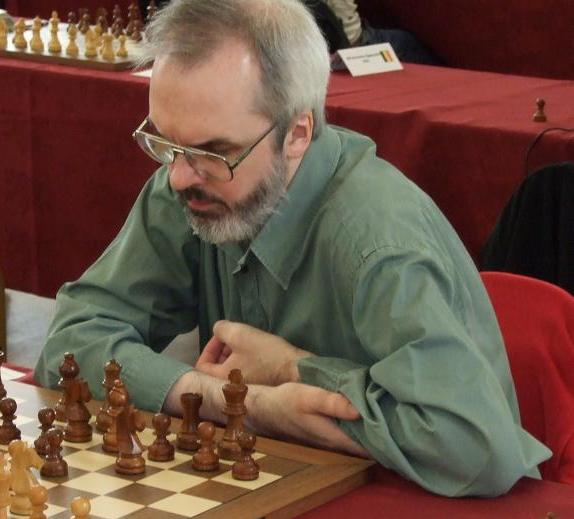
- Shaw in 2008

Personal information
- Born: 16 October 1968 (age 57) Irvine, Scotland

Chess career
- Country: Scotland
- Title: Grandmaster (2006)
- FIDE rating: 2425 (July 2026)
- Peak rating: 2506 (January 2002)

John K. Shaw (born 16 October 1968) is a Scottish chess player and author who holds the FIDE title of Grandmaster. He won the Scottish Championship in 1995 (tied), 1998, and 2000 (tied).

Shaw is an uncommon example of great progress in an adult chess player. In 1988, at age 19, his rating was 1745, which is the strength of an above average club player. He received the title of FIDE Master (FM) in 1994, International Master (IM) in 1999, and Grandmaster (GM) in 2006. To qualify for the GM title, he gained three norms at Gibraltar 2003, Calvia Olympiad 2004 and 4NCL Season 2005/6.

Shaw has competed with Scotland's chess team at ten Chess Olympiads: 1994, 1996, 2000, 2002, 2004, 2006, 2008, 2010, 2012, and 2014.

A writer of chess books, Shaw is also the Chief Editor of the publishing house Quality Chess.
