= Matthew Turner (chess player) =

British chess grandmaster (born 1975)

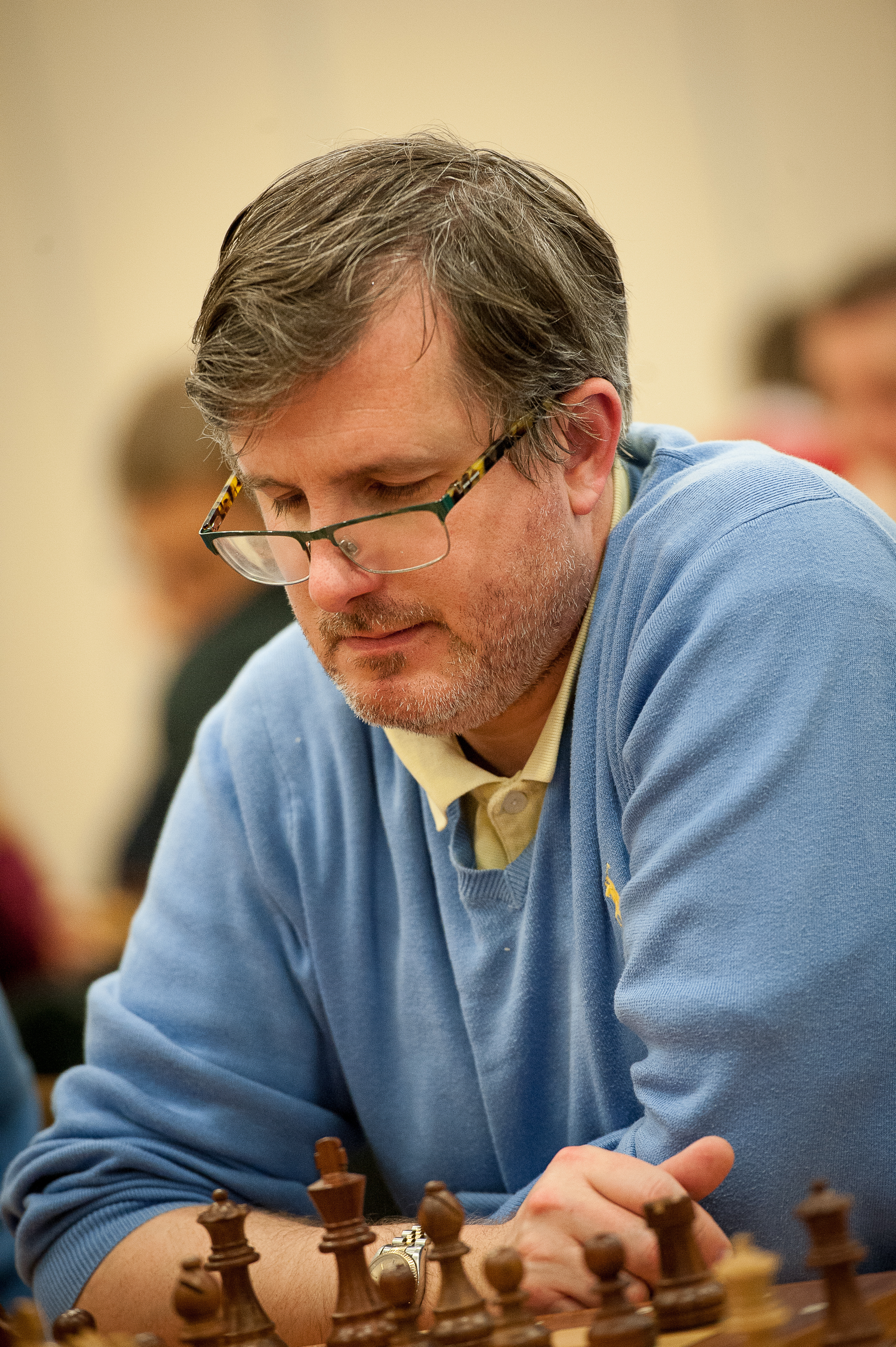
- Turner in 2016

Personal information
- Born: 11 December 1975 (age 50) Scunthorpe, England

Chess career
- Country: England (until 2012); Scotland (since 2012)
- Title: Grandmaster (2002)
- FIDE rating: 2460 (July 2026)
- Peak rating: 2545 (September 2017)

Matthew James Turner is a British chess grandmaster.

== Biography ==
In 2000, Turner appeared on series 43 of the British game show Countdown, where he finished as runner-up.

In July 2016, Turner won the Scottish Chess Championship with a score of 7.5/9. He would later win the championship again in 2019.

In February 2018, Turner won the Dyfed Congress Open and Blitz championships, winning both sections with a perfect score.

In February 2020, Turner gave a simultaneous exhibition to 28 players of the Ulster Chess Union in Belfast, winning 26 of the games and drawing two.

In March 2020, Turner won the 25th Dorset Rapidplay, remaining undefeated with a score of 5.5/6.
