= James Macrae Aitken =

Scottish chess player

James Macrae Aitken (27 October 1908 – 3 December 1983) was a Scottish chess player. Aitken was born in Calderbank, Lanarkshire, Scotland. In 1938 he received a PhD from Edinburgh University on the topic of 'The Trial of George Buchanan Before the Lisbon Inquisition'.

Aitken learned chess from his father at age 10. He was Scottish champion in 1935, 1952, 1953, 1955, 1956, 1957, 1958, 1960, 1961 and 1965, the latter jointly with PM Jamieson. He was also London Champion in 1950. In 1959 he had his best result in the British Championship, finishing tied for seventh place. Aitken represented Scotland in four Chess Olympiads. He played top board at Stockholm 1937, scoring only 32.4% but he did defeat Swedish GM Gideon Ståhlberg and draw with American GM Samuel Reshevsky. He played second board at Munich 1958 and Tel Aviv 1964, scoring 67.6% and 28.1% respectively. Aitken played sixth board at Skopje 1972, scoring 38.9%.

Aitken represented Great Britain in matches against the USSR and Yugoslavia. In the 1946 radio match between the United Kingdom and the USSR he lost his match with Igor Bondarevsky on board 8. Aitken defeated GM Savielly Tartakower at Southsea 1949 and GM Efim Bogoljubow at Bad Pyrmont 1951.

During World War II, Aitken worked in Hut 6 at Bletchley Park on solving German Enigma machines. On 2 December 1944 Bletchley Park played a 12-board team match against the Oxford University Chess Club. Bletchley Park won the match 8–4 with C.H.O'D. Alexander, Harry Golombek, and Aitken on the top three boards. Aitken wrote many book reviews for the British Chess Magazine. Aside from chess his hobbies included golf, philately, bridge, and watching cricket. He died in Cheltenham in 1983, aged 75.

== Aitken variation of the Giuoco Piano ==
In 1937 he recommended a line in the Greco Variation of the Giuoco Piano in the British Chess Magazine, now called the Aitken Variation: 1.e4 e5 2.Nf3 Nc6 3.Bc4 Bc5 4.c3 Nf6 5.d4 exd4 6.cxd4 Bb4+ 7.Nc3 Nxe4 8.O-O Nxc3 9.bxc3 Bxc3 10.Ba3.

Position: a8 black rook, c8 black bishop, d8 black queen, e8 black king, h8 black rook, a7 black pawn, b7 black pawn, c7 black pawn, d7 black pawn, f7 black pawn, g7 black pawn, h7 black pawn, c6 black knight, c4 white bishop, d4 white pawn, a3 white bishop, c3 black bishop, f3 white knight, a2 white pawn, f2 white pawn, g2 white pawn, h2 white pawn, a1 white rook, d1 white queen, f1 white rook, g1 white king

Aitken Variation after 10. Ba3
