= Max Pavey =

American chess master (1918–1957)

Personal information
- Born: March 5, 1918
- Died: September 4, 1957 (aged 39) New York City, U.S.

Chess career
- Country: United States

Max Pavey (March 5, 1918 – September 4, 1957) was an American chess master.

== Biography ==
After graduating from City College of New York in 1937, he studied medicine in Glasgow, and while a student won the Scottish Championship at Aberdeen 1939, with 7.5/9. Pavey would leave Scotland soon after this tournament, in June 1939, just before World War II. He was U.S. Lightning Champion in 1947. In 1948, he placed tied 5-8th place in the U.S. Open Chess Championship at Baltimore with 8.5/12. He was New York State Champion in 1949. During this time he also earned a master's degree in chemistry at Brooklyn College.

In 1951, he took third in New York (United States Chess Championship with 7/11; Larry Evans won). Also in that year, Pavey gave a simultaneous exhibition in Brooklyn, and faced a seven-year-old Bobby Fischer in the future World Chess Champion's first attempt at serious chess; Pavey won in about a quarter of an hour.

In 1954, he took third in the New York Manhattan Chess Club Championship (Arnold Denker won). In 1953, he finished second behind Donald Byrne at the Milwaukee U.S. Open Chess Championship. In 1954, he represented USA on third board in a match against the USSR in New York, and lost to Paul Keres (+1–2=0). Following this event, Chessmetrics estimates a peak rating of 2549 for Pavey in July 1954, ranking him No. 88 in the world. In 1955, he played on sixth board and lost to Tigran Petrosian (+0 –2 =0) in another USA vs USSR match in Moscow.

In 1955/56, he won in New York (Manhattan CC-ch), with 12/15. In 1956, he tied for 10-11th in New York (3rd Rosenwald Memorial; Samuel Reshevsky won). In 1956/57, he beat young Bobby Fischer in New York (Manhattan CC-ch, semi-final), and won group 2 of that event with 4/5.

Pavey died in the Mount Sinai Hospital, NYC, after a long battle with leukemia in 1957. The radium processing plant in Mt. Kisco where he worked as a plant supervisor immediately announced that it was shutting down, but the plant's owners, the Canadian Radium and Uranium Corp., initially denied there was a connection between Pavey's death and the plant's closure. A month after Pavey's death, the company pleaded guilty to "injuring" three workers, including Pavey.

== Notable chess games ==
- Anthony Santasiere vs Max Pavey, New York, US-ch 1951, English, A16, 0-1
- Max Pavey vs Paul Keres, New York 1954, match US vs SU, King's Indian Defense, E60, 1-0
- Robert James Fischer vs Max Pavey, New York Manhattan 1956, King's Indian Attack, Symmetrical Defense, A05, 0-1
