= Arthur John Mackenzie =

Scottish chess player

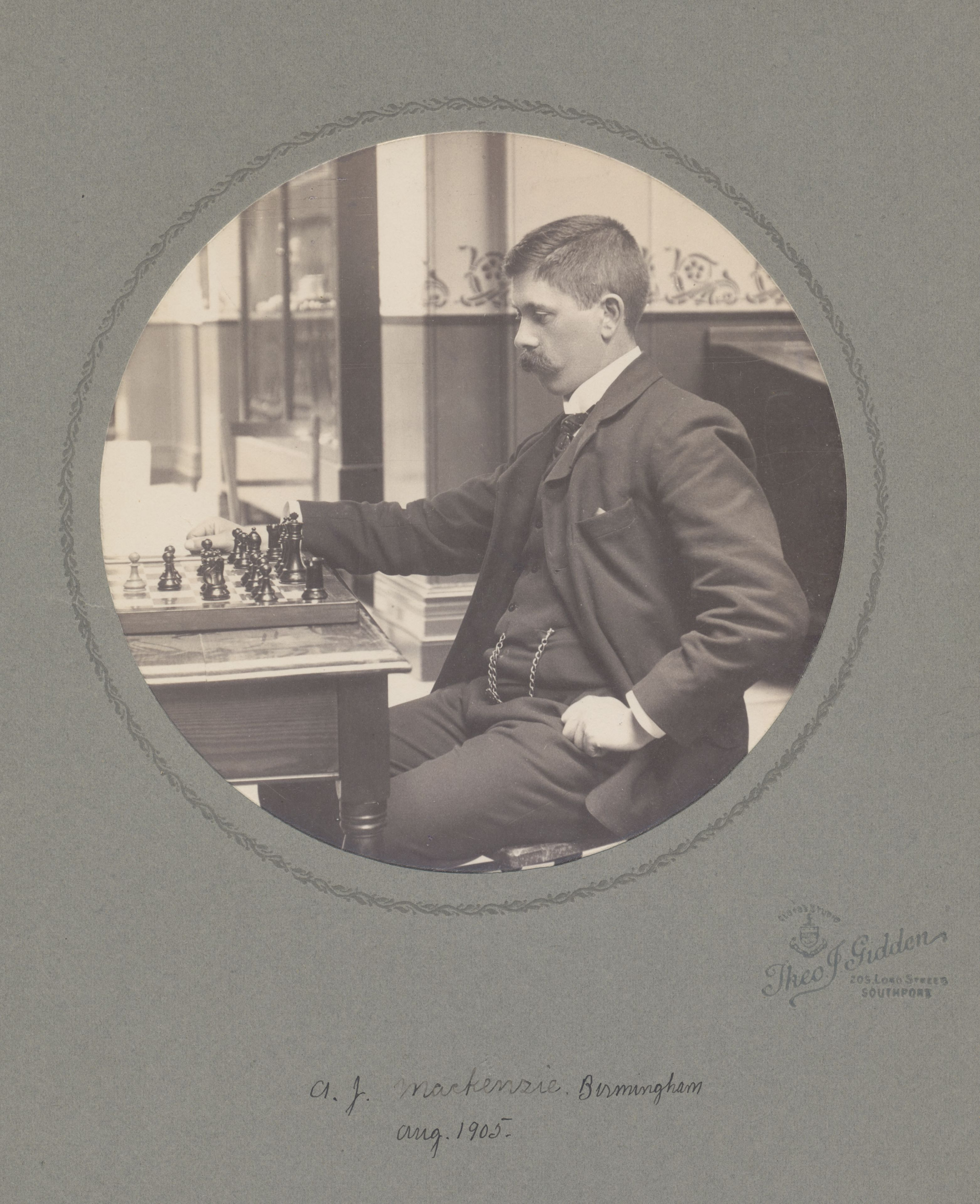

Personal information
- Born: 5 February 1871 Birmingham, England
- Died: 21 August 1949 (aged 78)

Chess career
- Country: United Kingdom

Arthur John Mackenzie (5 February 1871 – 21 August 1949) was a Scottish chess player, three-times Scottish Chess Championship winner (1908, 1909, 1913).

== Biography ==
Although born in Birmingham, Arthur John Mackenzie was associated with chess in Scotland because of his family background. He participated in Scottish Chess Championship from 1906 to 1928 and won this chess tournament on three occasions: 1908 (he scored 7/7), 1909 and 1913. He was Warwickshire County Chess Champion in 1931. Arthur John Mackenzie was multiple participant of the Hastings International Chess Congress minor tournaments.

Arthur John Mackenzie played for Scotland in the Chess Olympiad:

- In 1933, at fourth board in the 5th Chess Olympiad in Folkestone (+0, =1, -4).

Arthur John Mackenzie was very active in chess life organisation. He was one of the founders of the Birmingham and District Chess League in 1897, the Midland Counties Chess Association (later Union), also in 1897, and the British Chess Federation in 1904. Arthur John Mackenzie serving on British Chess Federation Executive from foundation to the 1930s. He was a controller at the famous Nottingham 1936 chess tournament, and he was the British delegate to the FIDE council at Stockholm 1937.

Mackenzie was the chess columnist for the Birmingham's Daily Post (from 1896 to 1948) and The Glasgow Herald.
