= Paul Motwani =

Scottish chess grandmaster (born 1962)

Personal information
- Born: 13 June 1962 (age 64) Glasgow, Scotland

Chess career
- Country: Scotland
- Title: Grandmaster (1992)
- Peak rating: 2552 (July 2004)

Paul Motwani (born 13 June 1962) is a Scottish chess grandmaster. He was the first Scottish player to become a grandmaster.

== Chess career ==
Born in Glasgow and raised in Dundee, he became World Cadet (Under 17) Champion in 1978, and won the first of his seven Scottish Championship titles that year. He was a secondary school mathematics teacher at St Saviour's RC High School in Dundee for a number of years after studying mathematics and physics at the University of Dundee. In 1990, he took time out to pursue his final Grandmaster norm.

Motwani has been a regular member of the Scottish Olympiad, never having had a performance rating below 2500. He made his first two Grandmaster norms at the 1986 and 1988 Olympiads, then faced a race against time to achieve his third before the first one expired in 1991. (Although norms now last a lifetime, the FIDE rule in place at the time saw them expiring after five years.) He just failed to reach the required number of points in a hastily organised tournament in Dundee days before the deadline. Ironically, FIDE changed the rules shortly after this, and reset the expiry time for norms at six years. He duly achieved his final norm in 1992, and starred in a Grampian Television documentary called "The Grandmasters of Dundee" along with Colin McNab, who had also achieved the title by then.

Motwani is a regular contributor to Scottish Chess (the magazine of Chess Scotland), The Scotsman (for whom he writes a weekly column) and has written for many other chess publications. He has written five chess books - H.O.T. Chess, C.O.O.L. Chess, S.T.A.R. Chess, Chess Under the Microscope and The Most Instructive Games of the Young Grandmasters. His writings are known for his use of acronyms to remember key concepts and some of the non-chess 'general puzzle' content (including 'Mr Fab' the alien).

== Personal life ==
Motwani is of Scottish and Indian descent. He currently lives in Belgium with his wife Jenny and son Michael. He teaches third grade and organizes an elementary school chess club at St. John's International School in Waterloo, Belgium and teaches mathematics in the Musica Mundi School in Waterloo, Belgium. His favorite number is the prime 3.

== Bibliography ==
- Motwani, Paul (1997). H.O.T. Chess. Intl Chess Enterprises. ISBN 1-879479-43-5.
- Motwani, Paul (1997). C.O.O.L. Chess. Intl Chess Enterprises. ISBN 1-879479-51-6.
- Motwani, Paul (1998). S.T.A.R. Chess. Gambit. ISBN 1-901983-03-X.
- Motwani, Paul (1999). The Most Instructive Games of the Young Grandmasters. Everyman Chess. ISBN 1-85744-534-1.
- Motwani, Paul (1999). Chess Under the Microscope. Sterling Pub Co Inc. ISBN 0-7134-8390-3.
