= Jacob Aagaard =

Danish and Scottish chess grandmaster (born 1973)

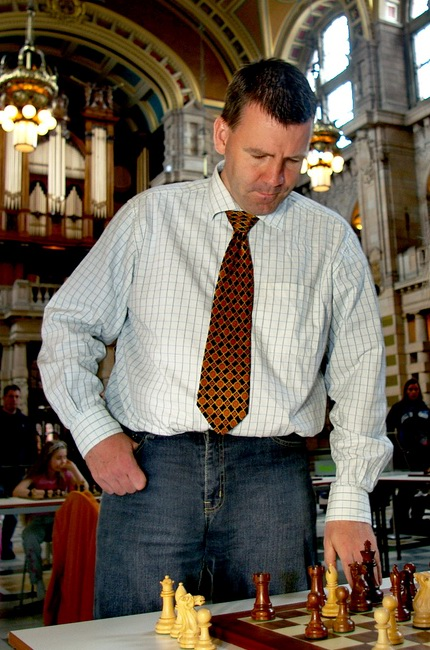
- Aagaard in 2008

Personal information
- Born: 31 July 1973 (age 53) Hørsholm, Denmark
- Education: Aarhus University, University of Copenhagen

Chess career
- Country: Denmark (before 2006; 2009–2017; since 2023); Scotland (2006–2009; 2017–2023)
- Title: Grandmaster (2007)
- FIDE rating: 2429 (October 2026)
- Peak rating: 2542 (May 2010)

Jacob Aagaard (born 31 July 1973) is a Danish and Scottish chess grandmaster, the 2007 British Chess Champion, and a chess author.

== Biography ==
In 2004, Aagaard took second place in the Scottish Chess Championship. In 2005, he took first place in the Scottish Championship but was not a British citizen, so the title went to Craig Pritchett. In 2012, he won the title; the first time he played and was eligible to win it. He is also a chess author and co-owner of Quality Chess, a chess publishing house.

== Awards ==
In 2011, Aagaard was awarded the title of FIDE Senior Trainer.

In 2012, Aagaard won the Scottish Chess Championships with a score of 7/9.

According to Quality Chess, as of 2013, Aagaard is the chess writer who has won the most awards: ChessCafe.com (2002), English Chess Federation (2010), Guardian (2010), the Boleslavsky Medal from FIDE's trainer committee (2011) and the Association of Chess Professionals (2013)

== Bibliography ==
- Jacob Aagaard (1998). Easy Guide to the Panov-Botvinnik Attack. Everyman Chess. ISBN 978-1-85744-563-3.
- Jacob Aagaard (2000). Easy Guide to the Sveshnikov Sicilian. Everyman Chess. ISBN 978-1-85744-280-9.
- Jacob Aagaard (2001). Dutch Stonewall. Everyman Chess. ISBN 978-1-85744-252-6.
- Jacob Aagaard (2001). Excelling at Chess. Everyman Chess. ISBN 978-1-85744-273-1.
- Jacob Aagaard (2002). Queen's Indian Defence. Everyman Chess. ISBN 978-1-85744-300-4.
- Jacob Aagaard; Esben Land (2002). Meeting 1.d4. Everyman Chess. ISBN 978-1-85744-224-3.
- Jacob Aagaard (2003). Excelling at Positional Chess. Everyman Chess. ISBN 978-1-85744-325-7.
- Jacob Aagaard (2004). Excelling at Chess Calculation. Everyman Chess. ISBN 978-1-85744-360-8.
- Jacob Aagaard (2004). Excelling at Combinational Play. Everyman Chess. ISBN 978-1-85744-345-5.
- Jacob Aagaard (2004). Excelling at Technical Chess. Everyman Chess. ISBN 978-1-85744-364-6.
- Jacob Aagaard (2004). Starting Out: The Grunfeld. Everyman Chess. ISBN 978-1-85744-350-9.
- Jacob Aagaard (2004). Inside the Chess Mind. Everyman Chess. ISBN 978-1857443578.
- Jacob Aagaard (2006). Practical Chess Defence. Quality Chess. ISBN 978-91-975244-4-5.
- Jacob Aagaard (2008). The Attacking Manual: Basic Principles. Quality Chess. ISBN 978-91-976004-0-8.
- Jacob Aagaard (2008). The Attacking Manual 2: Technique and Praxis. Quality Chess. ISBN 978-91-976004-1-5.
- Jacob Aagaard (2012). Grandmaster Preparation – Calculation. Quality Chess. ISBN 978-1-907982-31-6.
- Jacob Aagaard (2012). Grandmaster Preparation – Positional Play. Quality Chess. ISBN 978-1-907982-27-9.
- Jacob Aagaard; Nikolaos Ntirlis (2013). Playing the French. Quality Chess. ISBN 978-1-907982-36-1.
- Jacob Aagaard (2013). Grandmaster Preparation – Strategic Play. Quality Chess. ISBN 978-1-907982-29-3.
- Jacob Aagaard (2013). Grandmaster Preparation – Attack & Defence. Quality Chess. ISBN 978-1-907982-70-5.
- Jacob Aagaard (2014). Grandmaster Preparation – Endgame Play. Quality Chess. ISBN 978-1-907982-32-3.
- Jacob Aagaard (2017). Grandmaster Preparation – Thinking Inside the Box. Quality Chess. ISBN 978-1-907982-35-4.
- Jacob Aagaard (2022). A Matter of Endgame Technique (Grandmaster Knowledge). Quality Chess. ISBN 978-1-784831-62-2.

== Notable games ==
Aagaard vs. Rasmussen, Brøndby 1996

Position: f8 black rook, g8 black rook, a7 black pawn, b7 white rook, h7 black pawn, c6 white queen, d6 black pawn, g6 black queen, f5 black pawn, a4 black king, b4 white pawn, h4 white pawn, c3 white pawn, d3 white pawn, g3 white pawn, a2 white pawn, c2 white king

Final position
- Jacob Aagaard vs Per Arnt Rasmussen, 1996, King's Gambit: Accepted, Kieseritzky Gambit Kolisch Defense (C39), 1-0
