= 4NCL =

UK chess league

The 4NCL, or Four Nations Chess League, is the national chess league of Britain and Ireland. The league is named after the four constituent nations: England, Scotland, Wales, and Ireland. (Note: Northern Ireland does not have a separate FIDE federation from the Republic of Ireland.)

The league is played over five weekends, typically at Midlands hotel venues starting in October/November and finishing on the early May bank holiday), and in the top two divisions teams consist of 8 players (at least one of whom must be female).

The 4NCL is run independently as a limited company outside the control of any individual nation's chess governing bodies.

Although an amateur competition for most of its teams, some of the top teams in the league have been able to secure sponsors (including Chess.com and Chessable) to allow them to hire some of the world's top grandmasters. Some of the players to have played in the 4NCL include Michael Adams, Alexei Shirov, Maxime Vachier-Lagrave, Anish Giri, Nigel Short, Viktor Korchnoi, Alexander Morozevich, and Peter Svidler.

== History ==
The league was founded in 1993 by Chris Dunworth, who served as the League's Managing Director for the first decade of its existence.

4NCL's inaugural weekend took place on 2 and 3 October 1993 at the Barbican Centre in London. This was held at the same time as the World Chess Championship 1993 match between Kasparov and Short at the Savoy Theatre, about 2 miles away.

== See also ==
- Chess Bundesliga, the German national team chess league
