= Jonathan Rowson =

Scottish chess grandmaster (born 1977)

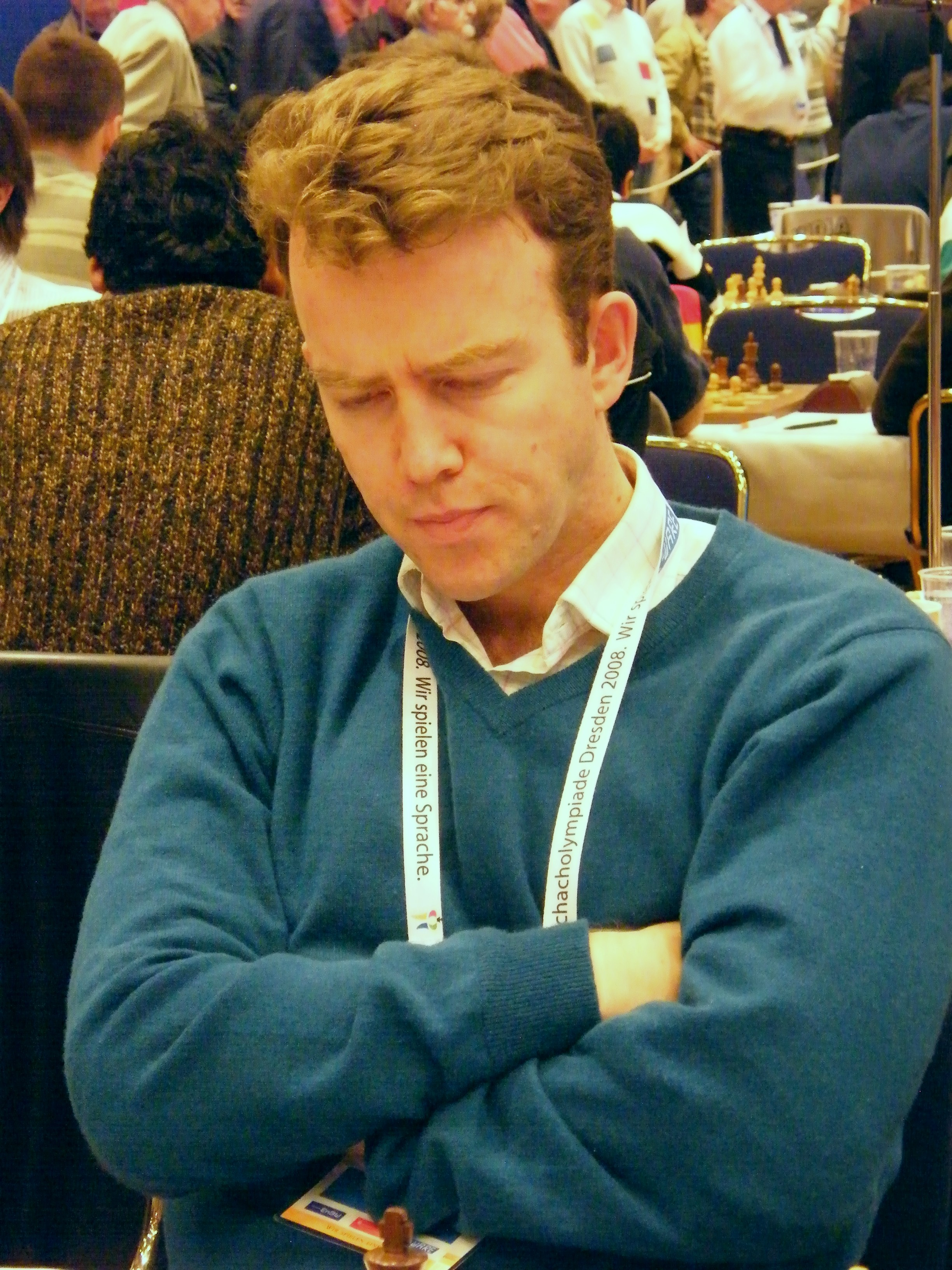
- Rowson at the 38th Chess Olympiad

Personal information
- Born: 18 April 1977 (age 49) Aberdeen, Scotland

Chess career
- Country: Scotland
- Title: Grandmaster (1999)
- FIDE rating: 2524 (July 2026)
- Peak rating: 2599 (July 2005)

Jonathan Rowson (born 18 April 1977) is a Scottish chess grandmaster. He is a three-time British chess champion and was awarded the title of Grandmaster by FIDE in 1999. He was awarded an Open Society Fellowship in 2018 by the Open Society Foundations. He now works as an intellectual entrepreneur and civil society leader as co-founder and Chief Executive of Perspectiva.

== Career ==
Rowson came second in the European Under 20 Championship in 1997 and achieved his third and final norm required for the title of Grandmaster in the 1999 Scottish Chess Championship. He went on to win the event again in 2001 and 2004, and went on to become the 2004 British Champion. He successfully defended his British title in 2005 and again in 2006. He also won the 2000 Canadian Open Chess Championship and tied for first with Vasilios Kotronias in the Hastings International Chess Congress in 2003/04.

Rowson was Director of the Social Brain Centre at the RSA and writes for The Guardian's Behavioural Insights Blog, was formerly a columnist for the Herald newspaper, and has authored three books. In 2016, he founded the research institute Perspectiva in London together with Tomas Björkman.

== Chess strength ==
Rowson's peak rating of 2599 was achieved in July 2005, when he was ranked number 139 in the world. In addition to winning the British Championship in three consecutive years, Rowson's best results include sharing first at the World Open in Philadelphia in 2002, at the Hastings Premier in 2003/4, and outright first at the Capo D'Orso open in Sardinia in 2008.

== Books ==
Rowson has written numerous magazine articles and four books on the game:

- Understanding the Grunfeld (1998). Gambit Publications. ISBN 1-901983-09-9;
- The Seven Deadly Chess Sins (2000). Gambit Publications. ISBN 1-901983-36-6;
- Chess for Zebras (2005). Gambit Publications. ISBN 1-901983-85-4;
- The Moves That Matter: A Chess Grandmaster on the Game of Life (2019). Bloomsbury Publishing ISBN 1-635573-32-7
