= Elisabeth Bronfen =

German specialist in literature and writer

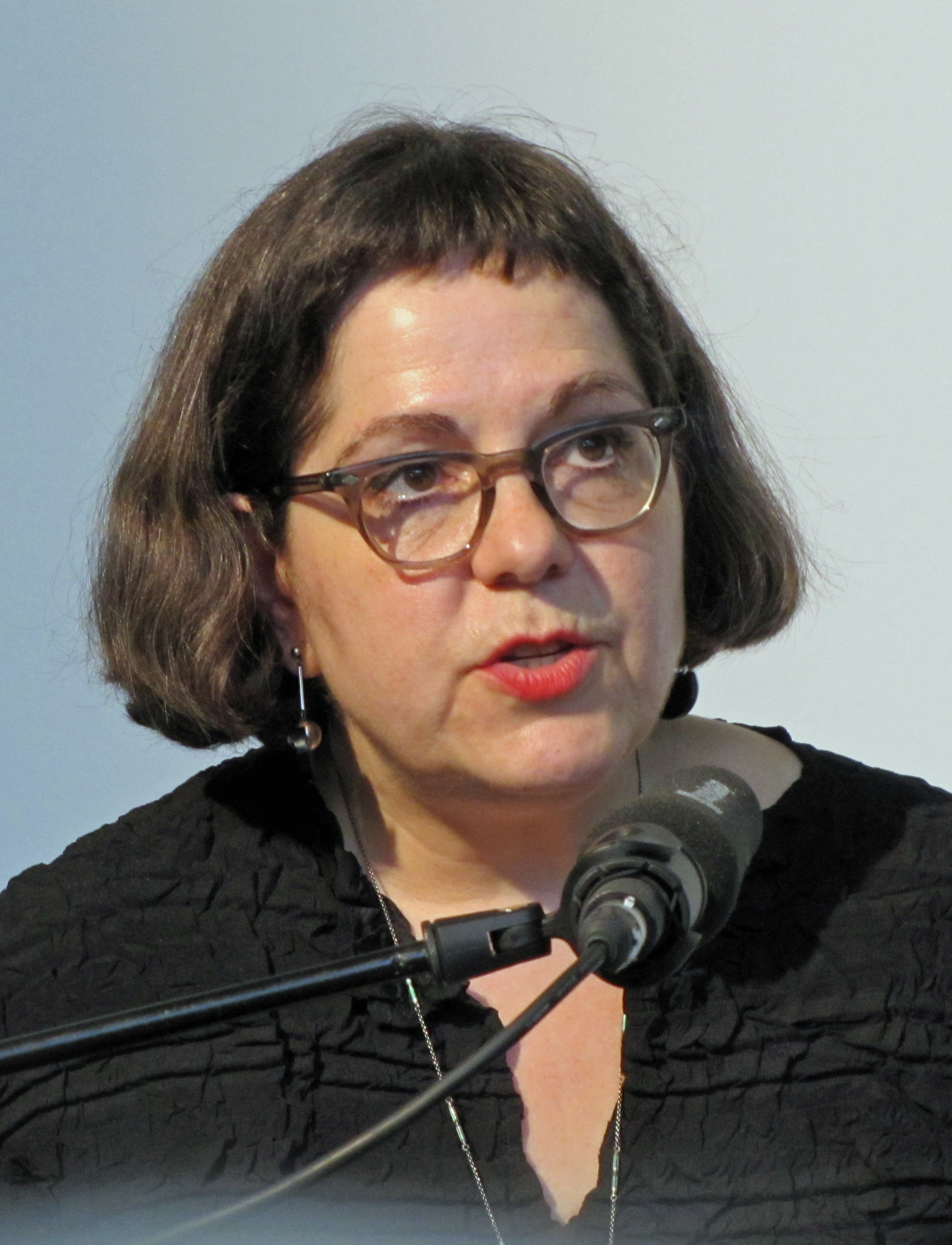
Elisabeth Bronfen in 2013

Elisabeth Bronfen (born 23 April 1958 in Munich) is a Swiss/German/American literary and cultural critic and academic. She is a professor emerita and former chairholder for English literature at the University of Zurich as well as a global distinguished professor at New York University. Her research interests include 19th- and 20th-century American and British literature, gender studies, psychoanalysis as well as the intersection and interaction between different cultural media.

== Academic career ==
Elisabeth Bronfen studied German, English and Comparative literature at Radcliffe College and Harvard. From 1985 until 1992, she worked as an assistant at LMU Munich and wrote her doctorate on Dorothy Richardson's Pilgrimage novels as well as her habilitation Over Her Dead Body (1992). Bronfen held a chair at the University of Zurich from 1993 to 2023.

== Works ==
In Over Her Dead Body (1992), Bronfen presents death as a fundamental deficit that is often negotiated over female bodies (be they dead or alive) in Western societies, citing Wuthering Heights, Frankenstein, and Vertigo. The literary and/or visual representation of death can therefore be read as a symptom of western culture, in which the female body epitomizes the Other whose death is imagined culturally.

In The Knotted Subject (1998), Bronfen relates the "elusive, protean, and enigmatic psychosomatic disorder" of hysteria to cultural works by Ann Raddcliffe, Anne Sexton, Alfred Hitchcock, David Cronenberg, and Cindy Sherman. In her analysis, the human navel serves as a metaphor for both connection and detachment that is linked to the eponymous knotted subject of the hysteric because it too stems from a knot.

Home in Hollywood (1999/2004) is an analysis of the portrayal of psychological processes in film classics such as Rebecca, The Wizard of Oz, and The Searchers. In particular, Bronfen traces the depiction of the Freudian Uncanny in these films. Her main thesis is that a "knowledge of the uncanniness of existence" remains visible in these movies despite their attempts of making sense of reality by giving the viewers a metaphorical home in the cinematic world.

In Specters of War (2012), Bronfen analyses how Hollywood cinema and American television come to terms with US military history. From the "unfinished business" of civil war in Gone with the Wind and Gangs of New York to the "choreography of battle" in Saving Private Ryan and Band of Brothers, Bronfen investigates the parallels between military and cinematic spectacle.

In Night Passages (2008/2013), Bronfen traces night as a trope from William Shakespeare through 19th-century realism to film noir and links the nocturnal to the primordial darkness that existed before the advent of in western culture’s "mythic narratives."

Mad Men, Death and the American Dream (2015) is an analysis of Matthew Weiner’s award-winning TV show Mad Men. According to Bronfen, the show not only successfully revives the past, but also comments on the state of the US nation and the role of the American Dream in the 20th century.

In 2018, Elisabeth Bronfen's collection of essays in visual culture Crossmappings (2009) appeared in English. Therein, Bronfen proposes a reading method of the same name that is based on mapping and comparing formal aspects of cultural texts such as character constellations or political themes. According to Bronfen, this method allows for new insights into both the earlier and the later text. Rolf Löchel calls crossmapping a comparative method that not only uncovers intertextualities but also carves out similar concerns of texts from different media such as literature, cinema, television and painting. Amongst others, Bronfen crossmaps Charlotte Perkins Gilman’s novella The Yellow Wallpaper with the photographic oeuvre of Francesca Woodman, pop art with Baz Luhrmann’s Shakespeare adaption Romeo + Juliet, as well as Shakespeare’s Henriad with David Simon’s The Wire. In her teaching, Elisabeth Bronfen has further crossmapped Macbeth with Beau Willimon’s House of Cards and traced the rewritings of A Midsummer Night's Dream in Hollywood from Max Reinhardt’s 1935 adaption via George Cukor’s The Philadelphia Story and Howard Hawks’ The Big Sleep to Susan Seidelman’s Desperately Seeking Susan.

== Select bibliography ==
- Death and Representation (1993). Edited by Bronfen and Sarah W. Goodwin. Baltimore: Johns Hopkins University Press. ISBN 9780801846274.
- Over her Dead Body (1992). Manchester: Manchester University Press. ISBN 9780719038273.
- The Knotted Subject: Hysteria and its Discontents (1998). Princeton: Princeton University Press. ISBN 9780691636849.
- Dorothy Richardson's Art of Memory: Space, Identity, Text (1999). Manchester: Manchester University Press. ISBN 9780719083266.
- Feminist Consequences (2000). Edited by Bronfen and Misha Kavka. New York: Columbia University Press. ISBN 9780231117043.
- Home in Hollywood: The Imaginary Geography of Cinema (2004). New York: Columbia University Press. ISBN 9780231121767.
- Specters of War: Hollywoods Engagement with Military Conflict (2012). New Brunswick: Rutgers University Press. ISBN 9780813553979.
- Night Passages: Philosophy, Literature, and Film (2013). Translated by Bronfen and David Brenner. New York: Columbia University Press. ISBN 9780231147989.
- Gothic Renaissance: A Reassessment (2014). Edited by Bronfen and Beate Neumeier. Manchester: Manchester University Press. ISBN 9780719088636.
- Mad Men: Death and the American Dream (2016). Zürich: Diaphanes. ISBN 9783037345504.
- Crossmappings: On Visual Culture (2018). London: I.B. Tauris. ISBN 978-1-78831-107-6.
- Obsessed: The Cultural Critic’s Life in the Kitchen. (2019). New Brunswick: Rutgers University Press. ISBN 978-1-9788-0363-3.
- Serial Shakespeare: An infinite variety of appropriations in American TV drama (2020). Manchester: Manchester University Press. ISBN 978-1-5261-4231-3.
- Shakespeare and Seriality: Page, Stage, Screen (2025). Edited by Bronfen and Christina Wald. London: The Arden Shakespeare. ISBN 978-1-3504-3726-5. (Open access).
