= You Have to Be Careful in the Land of the Free =

2004 novel by James Kelman

- First edition
- Author: James Kelman
- Language: English
- Genre: Stream of consciousness, political fiction
- Publisher: Hamish Hamilton
- Publication date: 2004
- Publication place: Scotland
- Media type: Print

You Have to Be Careful in the Land of the Free is a novel by the Scottish writer James Kelman, published in 2004.

== Critical reception ==
Irvine Welsh, writing in The Guardian, highlights Kelman's originality and technical ability, and notes that this challenging novel which deals with the theme of "our identity and status within the globalised order" is "the book that many hand-wringing liberals have always wanted to write but are manifestly ill-equipped to undertake". In his review, Welsh concludes that "this brave and provocative novel deserves to be widely read".

Dwight Garner in The New York Times wrote that "this novel happens to be very, very fine -- his best since How Late It Was, and in some ways his most angrily profound book, period. It's not just a first-rate drinking novel and a first-rate elegiac failure novel and a first-rate Fred Exley-ish novel about loserdom (loserdom being the song Kelman was born to sing). It may also be the best -- it's certainly the most paranoid -- book we've had thus far about the political and social reverberations of 9/11 in this country.".

During a 4-city author tour a reviewer for Publishers Weekly commented that "Kelman's latest will please and reward readers patient enough to pull up a chair and listen." While Kirkus took an opposite side of the table and wrote "[e]thnic prose authentically rendered fails to congeal into a persuasive whole."
