= Richard Church (poet) =

English writer (1893–1972)

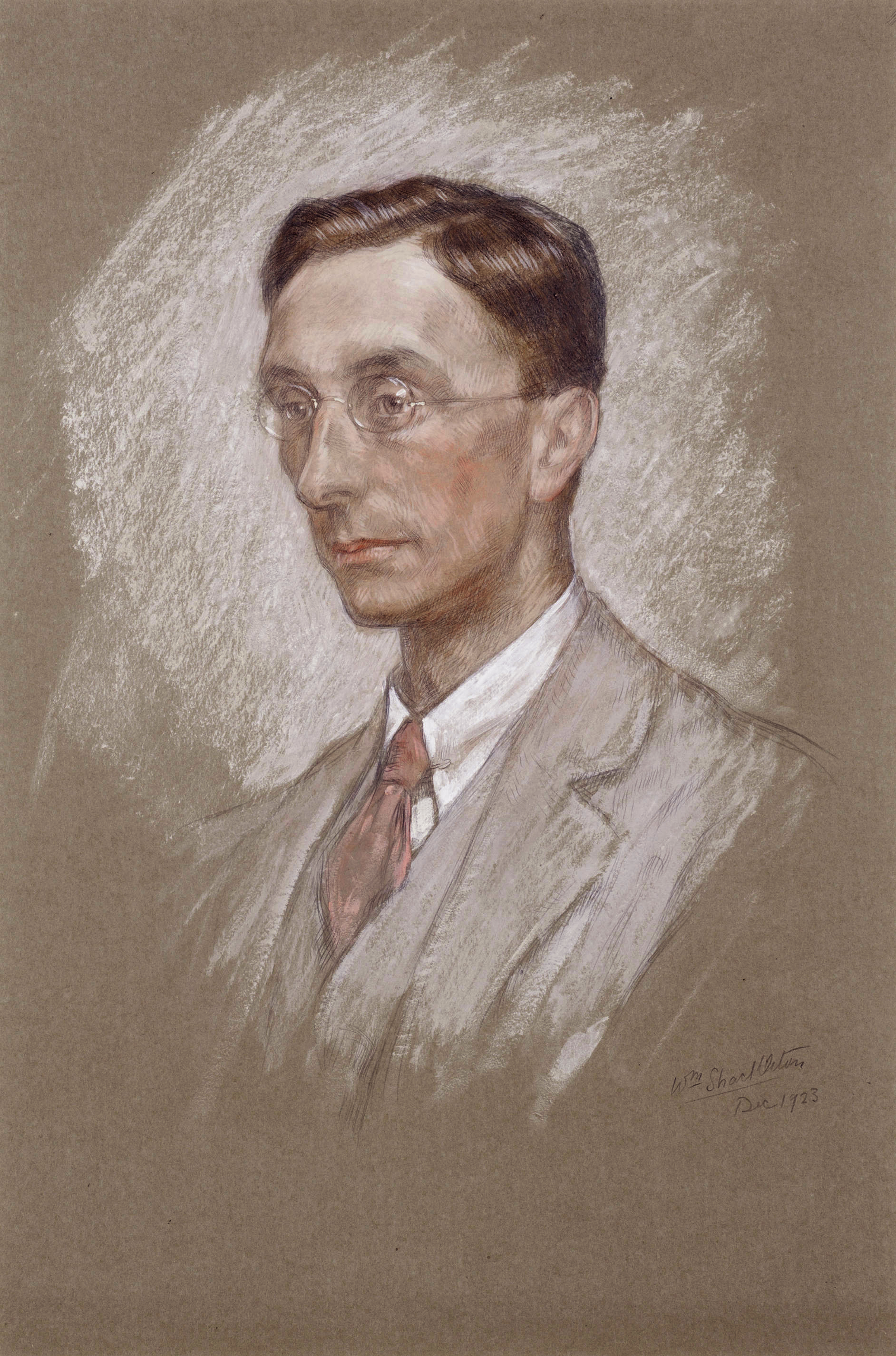
Richard Church (William Shackleton)

Richard Thomas Church CBE (26 March 1893 – 4 March 1972) was an English writer, poet and critic; he also wrote novels and verse plays, and three volumes of autobiography.

== Early life ==
Church was born on 26 March 1893 in Battersea, in south London. He went to Dulwich Hamlet School in Dulwich. The second son of Thomas John Church and Lavina Annie Orton Church. His mother was distantly related to the novelist George Eliot but kept quiet about this because of her bohemian lifestyle. His father was a sorter for the General Post Office and his mother was a schoolteacher who suffered ill-health and died in 1910 when he was only seventeen. After leaving school at sixteen, he started work as a clerk in the Customs and Excise branch of the Civil Service. In his first volume of autobiography he recounts the physicality of his father, the intelligence of his mother, his resourceful older brother, privations, and the difficult relationship of his ill-matched parents.

His first book of poems, The Flood of Life, was published in 1917 when he was 24, but he remained in the Civil Service until 1933, when he left to write full-time at the age of 40.

== Career ==
Church became a respected journalist and reviewer, and wrote extensively on country matters. His first poetry appeared in Robert Blatchford's Clarion, and he contributed verse to periodicals for the rest of his life.

His first post as a literary editor was with the New Leader, organ of the Independent Labour Party. He was director of the Oxford Festival of Spoken Poetry during the 1930s. His much-anthologised World War I poem "Mud" first appeared in Life and Letters, January 1935. He worked as Editor for the publisher J.M. Dent between 1933 and 1951.

The first volume of Church's autobiography, Over the Bridge (1955), was awarded the Sunday Times Prize for Literature while the novelist Howard Spring described it as "the loveliest autobiography written in our time," pointing out that the writer had "found life full of enchantment, and how not the least of its enchantments was its challenge." The second volume, The Golden Sovereign, appeared in 1957. That year Church was named a Commander of the Order of the British Empire by Queen Elizabeth II.

== Mystical experience ==
While young, Church had a mystical experience at a convalescent home, which he recounted in his autobiography, Over the Bridge, and which was also recounted by the British occultist writer Colin Wilson. Looking out of some French windows, Church saw a gardener chopping down a dead tree. What struck Church after a while was that the sight of the axe hitting the tree and the sound of the axe hitting the tree were not synchronised. The sound was delayed. At first, he did not believe his own powers of perception, but after concentrating on his vision and hearing, he came to the conclusion that he was experiencing an error in the laws of physics. He came to the conclusion – which would remain with him for the rest of his life – that "time and space are not absolute. Their power was not law." He experienced incredible freedom in this epiphany. "(...) I was free. Since time and space were deceivers, openly contradicting each other, and at best offering a compromise in place of law"

After this epiphany another soon followed. From where he stood he sensed that "(...) my limbs and trunk were lighter than they seemed, and that I had only to reduce them by an act of will, perhaps by a mere change of physical mechanics, to command them off the ground, out of the tyranny of gravitation". He then left the ground and glided "about the room" some twelve or eighteen inches above the floor. He returned to the ground only to take off once more.

== Personal life ==
Church married three times: firstly to Caroline Parfett in 1915, with whom he had three daughters, this marriage ending in divorce. He married his second wife, Catherina Schimmer on 19 November 1930, and the couple had a son before her death in 1965. He married his third wife, Dorothy Beale, a widow, on 25 February 1967.

He had a great love for the Kent countryside and this is reflected in much of his writing. He published an anthology of works on Kent.

== Death ==
He and Dorothy initially lived at The Old Stable, they subsequently moved to The Priest's House at Sissinghurst Castle in Cranbrook where he died suddenly, aged 78, on 4 March 1972.

== Works ==
=== Verse ===
- The Flood of Life; and other Poems (1917)
- Hurricane; and Other Poems (1919)
- Philip (1923)
- The Portrait of the Abbot (1926)
- The Dream (1927)
- Theme with Variations (1928)
- Mood without Measure (1928)
- The Glance Backward (1930)
- News from the Mountain (1932)
- Twelve Noon (1936)
- Swinburne Poems and Prose (1940) introduction by Richard Church
- The Solitary Man (1941)
- Twentieth Century Psalter (1943)
- Poems of Our Time, 1900-1942 (1945) editor, with M. M. Bozman
- The Lamp (1946)
- Collected Poems (1948)
- Poems for Speaking; an Anthology with an Essay on Reading Aloud (1950) editor
- Selected Lyrical Poems (1951)
- The Prodigal; a play in verse (1953)
- The Inheritors; poems, 1948-1955 (1957)
- Poems of Our Time, 1900-1960 (1959) editor, with M. M. Bozman, Edith Sitwell
- North of Rome (1960)
- The Burning Bush; Poems 1958-1966 (1967)
- Twenty-five Lyrical Poems from the hand of Richard Church (1967)

=== Fiction ===
- Oliver’s Daughter (1930)
- High Summer (1931)
- The Prodigal Father (1933)
- The Apple of Concord (1935)
- The Porch (1937)
- The Stronghold (1939)
- The Room Within (1940)
- The Sampler (1942)
- A Squirrel Called Rufus (1941) for children
- The Cave (1950) for children; in US Five Boys in a Cave (1951)
- The Nightingale (1952)
- Dog Toby; A Frontier Tale (1953) for children
- The Dangerous Years (1956)
- Down River (1957) for children, a sequel to The Cave.
- The Crab-Apple Tree (1959)
- The Bells of Rye (1960) for children
- Prince Albert (1963)
- The Room Within (1940)
- The White Doe (1968) for children
- Little Miss Moffatt; a confession (1969)
- The French Lieutenant; a ghost story (1971) for children

=== Autobiography ===
- Over the Bridge (1955)
- The Golden Sovereign (1957)
- The Voyage Home (1964)

=== General ===
- Mary Shelley (1928)
- Calling for a Spade (1939) essays on country themes
- Eight for Immortality (1941) studies of contemporary poets
- Plato's Mistake (1941)
- British Authors; a Twentieth Century Gallery (1943)
- Green Tide (1945) essays on country themes
- Kent (1948) in the County Books series
- A Window on a Hill (1951) essays on country themes
- The Growth of the English Novel (1951)
- Books and Writers (1952) by Robert Lynd with foreword by Richard Church
- The Royal Parks of London (1956)
- Small Moments (1957) essays
- The Spoken Word; an Anthology (1957)
- A Country Window; a round of essays (1958)
- Calm October; essays (1961)
- The Little Kingdom; a Kentish Collection (1964) editor
- A Stroll Before Dark; essays (1965)
- A Look at Tradition (1965) The British Association, Presidential Address
- London; Flower of Cities All (1966) with Imre Hofbauer
- Portrait of Canterbury (1953, 1968)
- Speaking Aloud (1968)
- The Wonder of Words (1970)
- A Harvest of Mushrooms; and other sporadic essays (1970)
- London in Colour (1971) with an introduction and commentaries by Richard Church
