= Some Recent Attacks =

1992 essay collection by James Kelman

- First edition
- Author: James Kelman
- Language: English
- Genre: Essays
- Publisher: AK Press, Stirling
- Publication date: 1992
- Publication place: Scotland
- Media type: Print

Some Recent Attacks: Essays Cultural and Political is a collection of essays by the Scottish writer James Kelman, published in 1992.

== Critical reception ==
Writing in the Times Literary Supplement, Douglas Dunn notes that the collection "is important for the light it sheds on the passion which is the strength of Kelman's novels and stories. For Kelman, to be an artist means entering into severe moral responsibilities". Dunn criticises what he sees as Kelman's "trenchant assertion" on the differentiation of "good writer" and "good artist", and expresses the opinion that it "is remarkable for a novelist, of all people, especially a fine one, to be seen trading with blatantly Manichaean counters". Dunn categorises Kelman's attack on the culture of literary criticism as "a heave from beneath, that is, an expression from a writer whose class and locale are traditionally disparaged by the literary mainstream".
