= Greyhound for Breakfast =

1988 short story collection by James Kelman

- First edition (publ. Secker & Warburg, UK) (publ. Farrar Straus & Giroux, US)
- Author: James Kelman
- Language: English
- Genre: Short stories
- Publisher: Secker & Warburg
- Publication date: 1988
- Publication place: England
- Media type: Print
- Awards: Cheltenham Prize for Literature

Greyhound for Breakfast is a collection of short stories by the Scottish writer James Kelman first published in 1988. The collection was awarded the Cheltenham Prize for Literature in 1987.

== Contents ==
- "Old Francis"
- "A History"
- "The one with the dog"
- "of the spirit"
- "Renee"
- "Fifty Pence"
- "Even Money"
- "Home for a couple of days"
- "Manchester in July"
- "not too long from now tonight will be that last time"
- "Forgetting to mention Allende"
- "Samaritans"
- "Foreign language users"
- "Let that be a lesson"
- "Good intentions"
- "Cute Chick!"
- "The Small Family"
- "End of a Beginning"
- "Leader from a Quality Newspaper"
- "A Sunday evening"
- "Benson’s visitor"
- "Governor of the Situation"
- "The Band of Hope"
- "This man for fuck sake"
- "Half an hour before he died"
- "In with the doctor"
- "That Other"
- "More complaints from the American Correspondent"
- "Where but what"
- "The guy with the crutch"
- "undeciphered tremors"
- "The wee boy that got killed
- "Incident on a windswept beach"
- "A Rolling Machine"
- "The Red Cockatoos"
- "The Failure"
- "Dum vivimus, vivamus"
- "The wean and that"
- "Even in communal pitches"
- "An old story"
- "dear o dear"
- "A Hunter"
- "Sunday papers"
- "Getting Outside"
- "John Devine"
- "ONE SUCH PREPARATION"
- "Greyhound for Breakfast"
