= The Busconductor Hines =

1984 novel by James Kelman

- First edition cover
- Author: James Kelman
- Language: English, Glasgow patter
- Genre: Literary fiction
- Set in: Glasgow, early 1980s
- Publisher: Polygon Books
- Publication date: 1984
- Publication place: Scotland
- Media type: Print: hardcover 8vo
- Pages: 237
- ISBN: 9781857990355
- OCLC: 11112299
- Dewey Decimal: 823.914
- Preceded by: A Chancer
- Followed by: A Disaffection

The Busconductor Hines is the first published novel of the Scottish writer James Kelman, published in 1984. This novel is the first to be published by Kelman, but it was written after A Chancer.

== Critical reception ==
A profile in the Sunday Times retells the reception of this novel by critics: "head Booker judge Richard Cobb voted Kelman's The Busconductor Hines to be one of the two worst books submitted to the competition. Addressing his audience, Cobb recalled with astonishment: "There was even one novel written entirely in Glaswegian!" This is just the kind of pompous remark that has fuelled Kelman's love-hate relationship with English critics (they love him, he hates them) and led to his metamorphosis into a cultural icon."

An article in the Scotland on Sunday wrote that Kelman's debut "landed among the literati like a mortar bomb at Heathrow". It highlights critics comments about the book as "demonic" due to "the sheer profusion of profanity, academics and middle class book browsers could not cope with the verbal barrage", and goes on to conclude that "what Cobb and his confreres failed to grasp was that The Busconductor Hines was the beginning of a revolution in the novel."

Anthony Quinn, in the Independent, wrote that this "astonishing" first novel "immediately established the voice - angry, wounded, intense, sorrowful - yet capable at the same time of irrational mirth and moments of extreme tenderness and grace".

Harry Ritchie, writing in the Sunday Times, notes that Kelman found his voice "halfway through The Busconductor Hines [...] The voice is an uncompromisingly working-class Glaswegian one, which must pose problems for non-Scots [...] and which also can mask its idiosyncrasies."
