= A Chancer =

1985 novel by Scottish writer James Kelman

- First edition
- Author: James Kelman
- Language: English
- Genre: Novel
- Publisher: Polygon Books
- Publication date: 1985
- Publication place: Scotland
- Media type: Print

A Chancer is a novel by the Scottish writer James Kelman published in 1985 by Polygon Books. This novel is the first to be written by Kelman, but it was published after The Busconductor Hines (1984).

In a 2016 interview, Kelman said of A Chancer: "'In that novel, there are no adverbs. There's only concrete. There wouldn't be anything with a value on it, unless it was said in dialogue. Because I tried to create a value-free novel.' He smiles, but there is a hint of resignedness when he says, 'That never gets picked up.'"
