= Dorothy Richardson =

British author and journalist (1873–1957)

- Born: 17 May 1873; Abingdon, England
- Died: 17 June 1957 (aged 84); Beckenham, Kent, England
- Resting place: Beckenham
- Occupations: Novelist and journalist
- Spouse: Alan Odle
- Writing career
- Genre: Novel
- Notable work: Pilgrimage
- Movement: Modernism

Dorothy Miller Richardson (17 May 1873 – 17 June 1957) was a British author and journalist. Author of Pilgrimage, a sequence of 13 semi-autobiographical novels published between 1915 and 1967—though Richardson saw them as chapters of one work—she was one of the earliest modernist novelists to use stream of consciousness as a narrative technique. Richardson also emphasises in Pilgrimage the importance and distinct nature of female experiences. The title Pilgrimage alludes not only to "the journey of the artist ... to self-realisation but, more practically, to the discovery of a unique creative form and expression".

== Biography ==
Richardson was born in Abingdon, Oxfordshire in 1873, the third of four daughters. After the fourth daughter was born her father (Charles) began referring to Dorothy as his son. Richardson "also attributed this habit to her own boylike willfulness". She lived at 'Whitefield' a large mansion type house on Albert Park (built by her father in 1871 and now owned by Abingdon School. Her family moved to Worthing, West Sussex in 1880 and then Putney, London in 1883. In London she "attended a progressive school influenced by the ideas of John Ruskin", and where "the pupils were encouraged to think for themselves". Here she "studied French, German, literature, logic and psychology". At seventeen, because of her father's financial difficulties she went to work as a governess and teacher, first in 1891 for six months at a finishing school in Hanover, Germany. In 1895 Richardson gave up work as a governess to take care of her severely depressed mother, but her mother committed suicide the same year. Richardson's father had become bankrupt at the end of 1893.

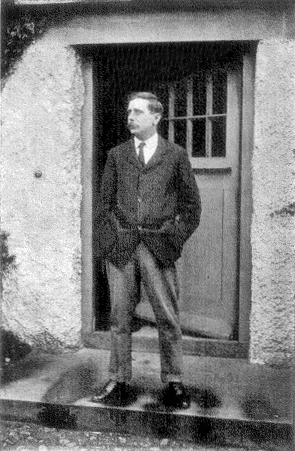
H. G. Wells, "Hypo Wilson" in Pilgrimage, in 1907 at his house in Sandgate, Kent, which Richardson often visited.

Richardson subsequently moved in 1896 to an attic room, 7 Endsleigh Street, Bloomsbury, London, where she worked as a receptionist/secretary/assistant in a Harley Street dental surgery. While in Bloomsbury in the late 1890s and early 1900s, Richardson associated with writers and radicals, including the Bloomsbury Group. In 1904 she took a holiday in the Bernese Oberland, financed by one of the dentists, which was the source for her novel Oberland. H. G. Wells (1866–1946) was a friend and they had a brief affair which led to a pregnancy and then miscarriage, in 1907. Wells was married to a former schoolmate of Richardson's. On leave from work she stayed in Pevensey, Sussex and went to Switzerland for the winter. Then she resigned from her Harley Street job and left London "to spend the next few years in Sussex ... on a farm run by a Quaker family". Richardson's interest in the Quakers led to her writing The Quakers Past and Present and editing an anthology Gleanings from the Works of George Fox, which were both published in 1914. She spent much of 1912 in Cornwall, and then in 1913 rented a room in St John's Wood, London, though she also lived in Cornwall.

While she had first published an article in 1902, Richardson's writing career as a freelance journalist really began around 1906, with periodical articles on various topics, book reviews, short stories, and poems, and as well she translated during her life eight books into English from French and German. The subjects of Richardson's book reviews and early essays range "from Whitman and Nietzsche to French philosophy and British politics" demonstrating both "the range of her interests and the sharpness of her mind". Starting in 1908 Richardson regularly wrote short prose essays, "sketches" for the Saturday Review, and around 1912 "a reviewer urged her to try writing a novel". She began writing Pointed Roofs, in the autumn of 1912, while staying with J. D. Beresford and his wife in Cornwall, and it was published in 1915.

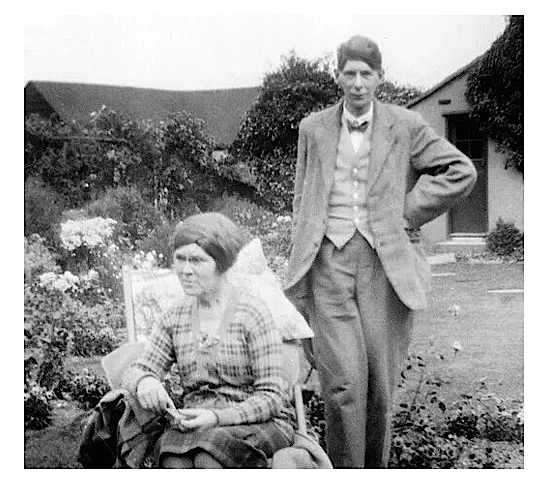
Richardson (seated) and Alan Odle at St John's Wood, London in 1931

She married the artist Alan Odle (1888–1948) in 1917—a distinctly bohemian figure, associated with an artistic circle that included Augustus John, Jacob Epstein, and Wyndham Lewis. He was fifteen years younger than her, tubercular and an alcoholic, and was not expected to live long. However, he stopped drinking and lived until 1948. Odle was very thin and "over six feet tall with waist-length hair wound around the outside of his head", which he never cut. He also rarely cut his finger nails. From 1917 until 1939, the couple spent their winters in Cornwall and their summers in London; and then stayed permanently in Cornwall until Odle's death in 1948. She supported herself and her husband with freelance writing for periodicals for many years, as Alan made little money from his art. Between 1927 and 1933 she published 23 articles on film in the avant-garde little magazine, Close Up, with which her close friend Bryher was involved.

The last chapters (books) of Pilgrimage published during Richardson's lifetime were Clear Horizon in 1935 and Dimple Hill in the 1938 Collected Edition. This edition received a disappointing critical reception and sold poorly, and Richardson, by now 65 years old, appears to have lost heart. During the rest of her life she published only three chapters of another volume, which appeared as "Work in Progress" in the literary journal Life and Letters in 1946.

In 1954 she had to move into a nursing home in the London suburb of Beckenham, Kent, where she died in 1957.

The final chapter (thirteenth book) of Pilgrimage, March Moonlight, was not published until 1967, concluding the fourth volume of the new Collected Edition. This unfinished novel includes the material published as "Work in Progress" in 1946.

== Stream of consciousness ==
In a review of Pointed Roofs (The Egoist April 1918), May Sinclair first applied the term "stream of consciousness" in her discussion of Richardson's stylistic innovations. Pointed Roofs was the first volume of Pilgrimage, the first complete stream of consciousness novel published in English. The term was first used by Alexander Bain in 1855 in the first edition of The Senses and the Intellect, but is commonly credited to William James who used it in 1890 in his The Principles of Psychology. In a letter to the bookseller and publisher Sylvia Beach in 1934, Richardson comments that "Proust, James Joyce, Virginia Woolf & D.R. ... were all using 'the new method', though very differently, simultaneously".

Richardson hated the term, calling it in 1949 "that lamentably meaningless metaphor 'The Shroud of Consciousness' borrowed ... by May Sinclair from the epistemologists, ... to describe my work, & still, in Lit. criticism. pushing its inane career".

== Pilgrimage ==
Miriam Henderson, the central character in the Pilgrimage novel sequence, is based on author's own life between 1891 and 1915. Richardson, however, saw Pilgrimage as one novel for which each of the individual volumes were "chapters". Pilgrimage was read as a work of fiction and "its critics did not suspect that its content was a reshaping of DMR's own experience", nor that it was a roman à clef.

== Feminist writer ==
Richardson is also an important feminist writer, because of the way her work assumes the validity and importance of female experiences as a subject for literature. She records that when she began writing, "attempting to produce a feminine equivalent of the current masculine realism", and after setting aside "a considerable mass of manuscript" finding "a fresh pathway". Her wariness of the conventions of language, her bending of the normal rules of punctuation, sentence length, and so on, are used to create a feminine prose, which Richardson saw as necessary for the expression of female experience. Virginia Woolf in 1923 noted, that Richardson "has invented, or, if she has not invented, developed and applied to her own uses, a sentence which we might call the psychological sentence of the feminine gender." In her 1938 "Foreword" to the Collected Edition of Pilgrimage Richardson responded to criticism of her writing, "for being unpunctuated and therefore unreadable", arguing that "Feminine prose, as Charles Dickens and James Joyce show themselves to be aware, should properly be unpunctuated, moving from point to point without formal obstruction".

John Cowper Powys, writing in 1931, saw Richardson as a "pioneer in a completely new direction" because she has created in her protagonist Miriam the first woman character who embodies the female "quest for the essence of human experience". Powys contrasts Richardson with other women novelists, such as George Eliot and Virginia Woolf whom he sees as betraying their deepest feminine instincts by using "as their medium of research not these instincts but the rationalistic methods of men". Likewise in 1975 Sydney Janet Kaplan describes Pilgrimage as "conceived in revolt against the established tradition of fiction. ... [Richardson's] writing marks a revolution in perspective, a shift from a 'masculine' to a 'feminine' method of exposition".

== London novelist ==
After first working as a governess in Germany and then England, early in her life Richardson "lived in a Bloomsbury attic [at 7 Endsleigh Street]... [and] London became her great adventure. And although Pointed Roofs focuses on Miriam's experience as a governess in Germany, much of Pilgrimage is set in London. London "is an 'elastic' material space that facilitates Miriam's public life. London's streets, cafés, restaurants and clubs figure largely in her explorations, which extend her knowledge of both the city and herself". John Cowper Powys in his 1931 study of Richardson, describes her as London's William Wordsworth, who instead of "the mystery of mountains and lakes" gives us "the mystery of roof-tops and pavements".

== Reputation ==
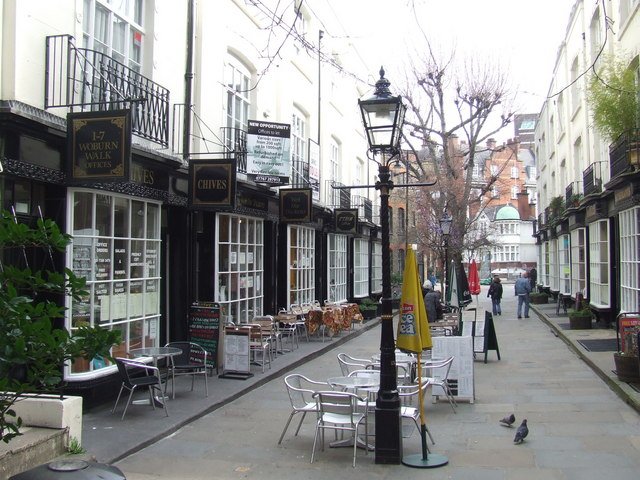
Woburn Walk, where Richardson lived in 1905 and 1906.

Rebecca Bowler wrote in August 2015: "Given Richardson's importance to the development of the English novel, her subsequent neglect is extraordinary". The first few of her novels "were received with rapturous enthusiasm and occasional confusion", but by the 1930s interest had declined—despite John Cowper Powys championing her in his short critical study Dorothy M. Richardson (1931). In 1928 Conrad Aiken, in a review of Oberland had attempted to explain why she was so "curiously little known," and offered the following reasons: her "minute recording" which tires those who want action; her choice of a woman's mind as centre; and her heroine's lack of "charm." By 1938 "she was sufficiently obscure for Ford Madox Ford to bewail the 'amazing phenomenon' of her 'complete world neglect'".

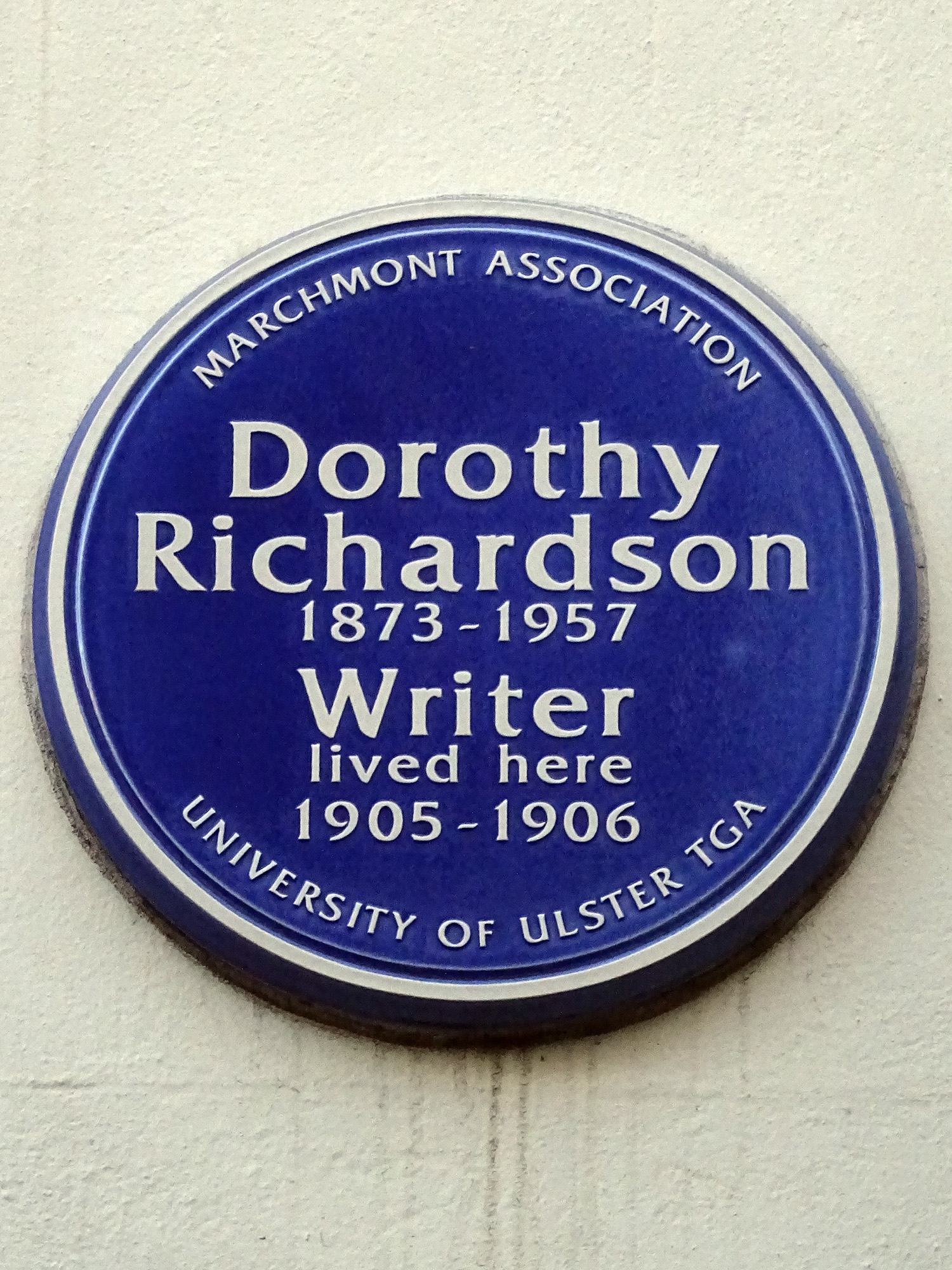
Commemorative plaque at 6 Woburn Walk, London

However, Richardson changed publishers and Dent & Cresset Press published a new Collected Edition of Pilgrimage in 1938. This was republished by Virago Press "in the late 1970s, in its admirable but temporary repopularisation of Richardson". In 1976 in America, a four volume Popular Library (New York) edition appeared. Now scholars are once again reclaiming her work and the Arts and Humanities Research Council in England is supporting the Dorothy Richardson Scholarly Editions Project, with the aim of publishing a collected edition of Richardson's works and letters. Pointed Roofs was translated into Japanese in 1934, French in 1965 and German in 1993. There were subsequent French translations of Backwater, 1992 and Deadlock, 1993.

A blue plaque was unveiled, in May 2015, at Woburn Walk in Bloomsbury, where Richardson lived, in 1905 and 1906, opposite W. B. Yeats, and The Guardian comments that "people are starting to read her once more, again reasserting her place in the canon of experimental modernist prose writers".

== Bibliography ==
A much fuller bibliography can be found at The Dorothy Richardson Society's website

=== Works ===
- The Quakers Past and Present, London: Constable, 1914.
- Gleanings from the Works of George Fox, London: Headley Brothers, 1914.
- John Austen and the Inseparables, London: William Jackson, 1930 (about the artist John Austen).
- Journey to Paradise: Short Stories and Autobiographical Sketches, London: Virago, 1989.
- Pilgrimage
  - Four-volume collected editions: 1938 (first 12 "chapters"; Dent and Cresset, London, and A.A. Knopf, New York), 1967 (J. M. Dent, London, and A.A. Knopf, New York), 1976 (Popular Library, New York), 1979 (Virago, London)

Publication history of Pilgrimage
Vol	Title	London publisher	Year	Notes
1	Pointed Roofs	Duckworth	1915	New York publication by A.A. Knopf was in 1916
2	Backwater	Duckworth	1916
3	Honeycomb	Duckworth	1917
4	The Tunnel	Duckworth	1919
5	Interim	Duckworth	1920	Serialized in 1919 in The Little Review, alongside Ulysses
6	Deadlock	Duckworth	1921
7	Revolving Lights	Duckworth	1923
8	The Trap	Duckworth	1925
9	Oberland	Duckworth	1927
10	Dawn's Left Hand	Duckworth	1931
11	Clear Horizon	JM Dent and Cresset Press	1935
12	Dimple Hill	JM Dent and Cresset Press	1938	First published in volume 4 of the 1938 collected edition
13	March Moonlight	JM Dent	1967	First published in full in volume 4 of the 1967 collected edition. The first three chapters had appeared as "A Work in Progress" in the literary journal Life and Letters in 1946

See also the following feminist anthologies:

- Scott, Bonnie Kime, The Gender of Modernism. Bloomington: Indiana University Press, c1990.
- Gilbert, Sandra M & Gubar, Susan Norton Anthology of Literature by Women. New York, N.Y.: Norton, c1985.

=== Early reviews ===
- Sinclair, M., "The novels of Dorothy Richardson", The Egoist, April 1918.
- [Woolf, V.], review of The Tunnel, (Times Literary Supplement, 13 February 1919); [V. Woolf], review of Revolving Lights, The Nation and the Athenaeum, 19 May 1923); both repr. in V. Woolf, Women and writing, ed. M. Barrett 1979.
- Dorothy Richardson Society Bibliography: Reviews and Obituaries

=== Obituaries ===
- The Times, 18 June 1957.
- Manchester Guardian, 18 June 1957.

=== Bibliographical studies ===
- Buchanan, Averill, Journal of Modern Literature, Vol. 24, No. 1, Autumn, 2000, 'Dorothy Miller Richardson: A Bibliography 1900 to 1999', pp. 135–160.

=== Biographies and letters ===
- Fouli, Janet (ed.). The Letters of John Cowper Powys and Dorothy Richardson. London: Cecil Wolf, 2008.
- Fromm, Gloria G. Dorothy Richardson: A Biography. Urbana: University of Illinois Press, 1977.
- Fromm, Gloria G. (ed.). Windows on Modernism: Selected Letters of Dorothy Richardson. Athens, Georgia, U. of Georgia Press, 1995.
- Gregory, Horace. Dorothy Richardson: An Adventure in Self-Discovery. New York: Holt, Rinehart & Winston, 1967.
- Rosenberg, John D. Dorothy Richardson: The Genius They Forgot. A Critical Biography. London: Duckworth; New York: Knopf, 1973.
- Thomson, George H. Dorothy Richardson: A Calendar of the Letters. ELT Press E-Book no.4, University of North Carolina at Greenboro.

=== Critical studies ===
- Blake, Caesar R. Dorothy M. Richardson. Ann Arbor: University of Michigan Press, 1960.
- Bluemel, Kristin. Experimenting on the Borders of Modernism: Dorothy Richardson's 'Pilgrimage' . Athens: University of Georgia Press, 1997.
- Bowler, Rebecca. Literary Impressionism: Vision and Memory in Dorothy Richardson, Ford Madox Ford, H.D. and May Sinclair. London: Bloomsbury, 2016.
- Eagleson, Harvey. Pedestal for Statue: 'The Novels of Dorothy M. Richardson. Sewanee, Tenn.: The University Press, 1934.
- Fouli, Janet. Structure and Identity: the Creative Imagination in Dorothy Richardson's Pilgrimage. Faculté des Lettres de la Manouba, Tunis, 1995.
- Gevirtz, Susan. Narrative's Journey: the Fiction and Film Writing of Dorothy Richardson. New York: P. Lang, 1996.
- Hanscombe, Gillian E. The Art of Life: Dorothy Richardson and the Development of Feminist Consciousness. London: Owen, 1982; Athens: Ohio University Press, 1983.
- Powys, John Cowper. Dorothy M. Richardson. London: Joiner & Steele, 1931.
- Radford, Jean. Dorothy Richardson. New York & London: Harvester Wheatsheaf, 1991; Bloomington: Indiana University Press, 1991.
- Staley, Thomas F. Dorothy Richardson. Boston: Twayne, 1976.
- Thomson, George H. Notes on 'Pilgrimage': Dorothy Richardson Annotated. Greensboro, N.C.: ELT Press, 1999.
- Thomson, George H. with Thomson, Dorothy F. The Editions of Dorothy Richardson's Pilgrimage: A Comparison of Texts. Greensboro, N.C.: ELT Press, 2001.
- Tucker, Eva. Pilgrimage: The Enchanted Guest of Spring and Summer: Dorothy Richardson 1873-1954: a Reassessment of Her Life and Work. Penzance: Hypatia Press, 2003.
- Watts, Carol. Dorothy Richardson. Plymouth: Northcote House in association with the British Council, 1995.
- Winning, Joanne. The Pilgrimage of Dorothy Richardson. Madison: University of Wisconsin Press, 2000.

=== Works partially on Richardson ===
- Kaplan, Sydney Janet. Feminine Consciousness in the Modem British Novel. Urbana & London: University of Illinois Press, 1975.
- Linett, Maren Tova. Modernism, Feminism, and Jewishness. New York: Cambridge University Press, 2007.
- Parsons, Deborah. Theorists of the modernist novel: James Joyce, Dorothy Richardson, Virginia Woolf. Abingdon: Routledge, 2007.

=== Main archives ===
- Beinecke Library, Yale University. A large collection of letters.
- British Library. Letters to E. B. C. Jones; letters to S. S. Koteliansky.
- Berg Collection, New York Public Library. Letters to P. P. Wadsworth
- Harry Ransom HRC, Austin, Texas.
- Library of Pennsylvania State University
- University of Tulsa. Letters and mss.
