= Not Not While The Giro =

1983 short story collection by James Kelman

Not Not While the Giro
- First edition
- Author: James Kelman
- Language: English
- Genre: Short stories
- Publisher: Polygon Books
- Publication date: 1983
- Publication place: Scotland
- Media type: Print

Not Not While the Giro is a collection of short stories by the Scottish writer James Kelman first published in 1983.

== Contents ==
- "He knew him well"
- "An old pub near the Angel"
- "Ten guitars"
- "Nice to be nice"
- "The bevel"
- "Charlie"
- "The house of an old woman"
- "Away in Airdrie"
- "The chief thing about this game"
- "Remember Young Cecil"
- "The habits of rats"
- "The block"
- "Jim dandy"
- "Acid"
- "The Melveille Twins, page 82"
- "Zuzzed"
- "A wide runner"
- "No longer the warehouseman"
- "Keep moving and no questions"
- "Double or clear plus a tenner"
- "A notebook to do with America"
- "The hitchhiker"
- "Wee horrors"
- "le jouer"
- "Roofsliding"
- "not not while the giro"
