= The Good Times (short story collection) =

1998 collection of short stories by James Kelman

- First edition
- Author: James Kelman
- Language: English
- Genre: Short stories
- Publisher: Secker & Warburg
- Publication date: 1998
- Publication place: England
- Media type: Print

The Good Times is a collection of short stories by the Scottish writer James Kelman, published in 1998.
