= If It Is Your Life =

2010 short story collection by James Kelman

First edition (publ. Hamish Hamilton)

If it is your life is a collection of short stories by the Scottish writer James Kelman published in 2010.

== Critical reception ==
Writing in the Glasgow Herald, Rosemary Goring notes that "It is a tour de force from a writer who treats language as carefully as if it were gold, and ends up turning it into something even more precious."
