= James Kelman =

Scottish writer (born 1946)

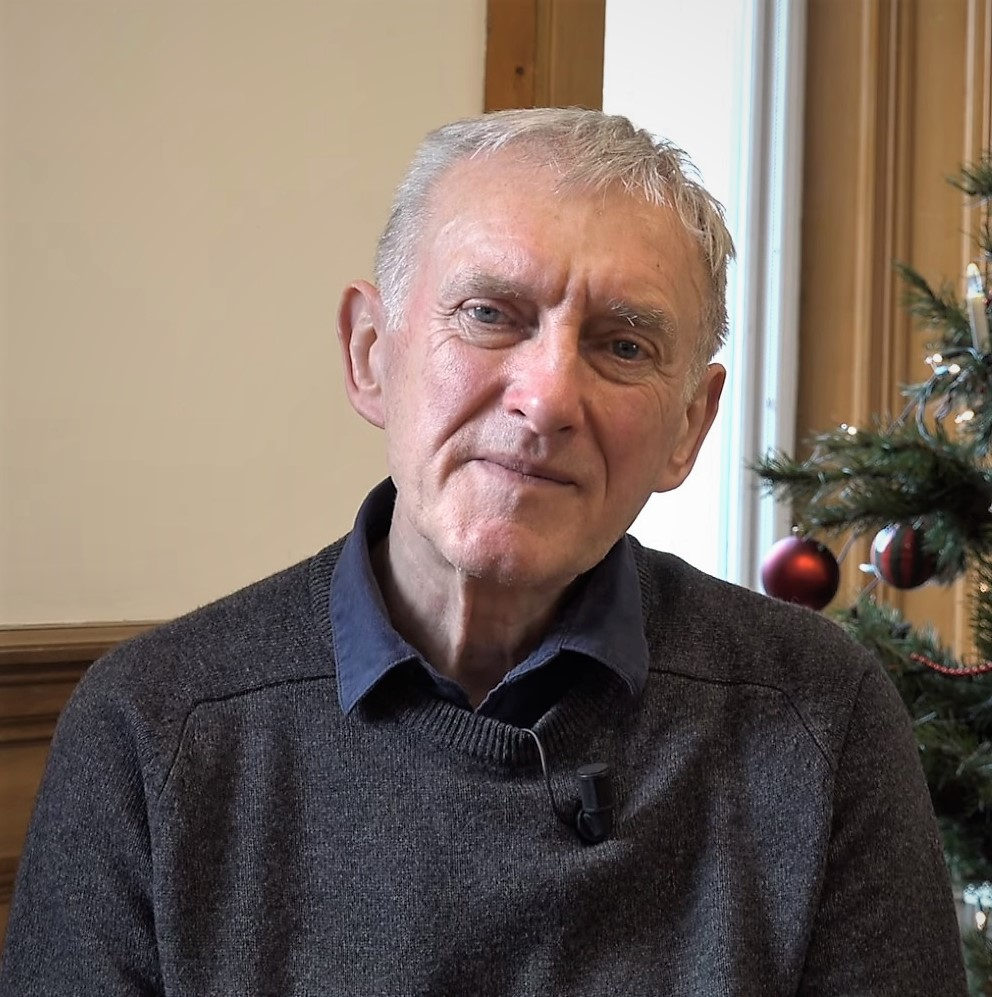
- Kelman speaks to Librairie Mollat about La route de Lafayette, French-language version of Dirt Road, in 2019
- Born: 9 June 1946 (age 80); Glasgow, Scotland
- Occupation: Writer
- Spouse(s): Marie Connors, m. 1969
- Writing career
- Genres: Stream of consciousness, absurdist fiction, paranoid fiction
- Notable works: A Disaffection (1989); How Late It Was, How Late (1994); Kieron Smith, Boy (2008)
- Notable awards: Booker Prize 1994: How Late It Was, How Late; Saltire Awards 2008: Kieron Smith, Boy

James Kelman (born 9 June 1946) is a Scottish novelist, short story writer, playwright and essayist. His fiction and short stories feature accounts of internal mental processes of usually, but not exclusively, working-class narrators and their labyrinthine struggles with authority or social interactions, mostly set in his home city of Glasgow. Frequently employing stream of consciousness experimentation, Kelman's stories typically feature "an atmosphere of gnarling paranoia, imprisoned minimalism, the boredom of survival."

His novel A Disaffection was shortlisted for the Booker Prize and won the James Tait Black Memorial Prize for Fiction in 1989. Kelman won the 1994 Booker Prize with How Late It Was, How Late. In 1998, Kelman was awarded the Glenfiddich Spirit of Scotland Award. His 2008 novel Kieron Smith, Boy won both of Scotland's principal literary awards: the Saltire Society's Book of the Year and the Scottish Arts Council Book of the Year.

In 2024, Kelman was honoured by the Saltire Society with a Lifetime Achievement Award for his contribution to Scottish literature. His literary archive is held at the National Library of Scotland.

== Life and work ==
Born in Glasgow, Scotland, Kelman says:

My own background is as normal or abnormal as anyone else's. Born and bred in Govan and Drumchapel, inner city tenement to the housing scheme homeland on the outer reaches of the city. Four brothers, my mother a full time parent, my father in the picture framemaking and gilding trade, trying to operate a one man business and I left school at 15 etc. etc. (...) For one reason or another, by the age of 21/22 I decided to write stories. The stories I wanted to write would derive from my own background, my own socio-cultural experience. I wanted to write as one of my own people, I wanted to write and remain a member of my own community.

Kelman himself stated his key influences came from "two literary traditions, the European Existential and the American Realist", although his style was also influenced by the modernist movement. Kelman has mentioned Émile Zola, Albert Camus, Franz Kafka, Fyodor Dostoevsky, Knut Hamsun, Jack Kerouac, Samuel Beckett, Henry Miller and James Joyce as being among the influences on his writing.

=== Short stories ===
During the 1970s, Kelman published his first collection of short stories. He became involved in Philip Hobsbaum's creative writing group in Glasgow, along with Tom Leonard, Alasdair Gray, Liz Lochhead, Aonghas MacNeacail and Jeff Torrington, and his short stories began to appear in magazines. These stories introduced a distinctive style, expressing first-person internal monologues in a pared-down prose using Glaswegian speech patterns, though avoiding for the most part the quasi-phonetic rendition of Tom Leonard. Kelman's developing style has been influential on the succeeding generation of Scottish novelists, including Irvine Welsh, Alan Warner and Janice Galloway.

In 1998, Kelman received the Stakis Prize for "Scottish Writer of the Year" for his collection of short stories The Good Times, one of several books of his stories that have been published. In 2012, a film was made based on the short story "Greyhound For Breakfast".

=== Novels ===
Kelman's first published novel was The Busconductor Hines (1984), although it was written after A Chancer, which was published in 1985. His 1989 novel A Disaffection was shortlisted for the Booker Prize and won the James Tait Black Memorial Prize for Fiction, and he won the 1994 Booker Prize for How Late It Was, How Late. His 2008 novel Kieron Smith, Boy won the Saltire Society's Book of the Year and the Scottish Arts Council Book of the Year.

Kelman's most recent novel, God's Teeth and Other Phenomena (2022), was described in a review by Gerry Hassan as a "tour de force [that] works as both a roman a clef, a writing primer and a guide to the world of literature and publishing. ... an astonishing book that confirms James Kelman's right to be seen as a global literary figure beyond any doubt."

=== Drama ===
Kelman's play Hardie and Baird: The Last Days, about the Radical Rising of 1820, was produced at the Traverse Theatre, Edinburgh, under the direction of Ian Brown, between 30 June and 22 July 1990.

== Critical reception ==
Kelman's 1994 Booker Prize win was, at the time, controversial due to what some saw as the book's casual use of strong language: one of the judges, Rabbi Julia Neuberger, denounced the awarding of the prize to Kelman's book as "a disgrace". Another judge, critic James Wood, recalls that "Kelman turned up at the foolishly formal, black-tie award dinner in a regular business suit and an open-necked shirt, the rebellious semiotics of which were quickly understood, and spoke about how the writer must stand up to oppression: 'My culture and my language have the right to exist, and no one has the authority to dismiss that. . . . A fine line can exist between élitism and racism. On matters concerning language and culture, the distance can sometimes cease to exist altogether.'"

The debate surrounding the use of this "offensive" language has been picked up by Kelman himself, who argues that the "Standard English" of traditional English novels is unrealistic. In his essay "The Importance of Glasgow in My Work", he compares the presentation of working-class and Scottish characters with those of the traditional "upper-class" English protagonist:

Everybody from a Glaswegian or working class background, everybody in fact from any regional part of Britain – none of them knew how to talk! What larks! Every time they opened their mouth out came a stream of gobbledygook. Beautiful! their language a cross between semaphore and Morse code; apostrophes here and apostrophes there; a strange hotchpoth of bad phonetics and horrendous spelling – unlike the nice stalwart upperclass English Hero (occasionally Scottish but with no linguistic variation) whose words on the page were always absolutely splendidly proper and pure and pristinely accurate, whether in dialogue or without. And what grammar! Colons and semi-colons! Straight out of their mouths! An incredible mastery of language. Most interesting of all, for myself as a writer, the narrative belonged to them and them alone. They owned it.

In 2020, Douglas Stuart on becoming the second Scottish writer to be awarded the Booker Prize, for his novel Shuggie Bain, said that his life was changed by Kelman's win with How Late It Was, How Late: "It is such a bold book, the prose and stream of consciousness is really inventive. But it is also one of the first times I saw my people, my dialect, on the page." As Stuart noted: "When James won in the mid-90s, Scottish voices were seen as disruptive and outside the norm."

== Political views and activism ==
Kelman's work has been described as flowing "not only from being an engaged writer, but a cultural and political activist". At the time of Glasgow's Year as City of Culture, Kelman was prominent in the Workers' City group, critical of the celebrations. The name was chosen as to draw attention to the renaming of part of the city centre as the Merchant City, which they described as promoting the "fallacy that Glasgow somehow exists because of (...) 18th century entrepreneurs and far-sighted politicians. (The merchants) were men who trafficked in degradation, causing untold misery, death and starvation to thousands" The Workers' City group campaigned against what was seen as the victimisation of People's Palace curator Elspeth King and a Council attempt to sell off one third of Glasgow Green. Their activities drew the ire of Labour Party councillors and commentators, with Kelman and his colleagues Hugh Savage and Farquhar McLay being described as "an 'embarrassment' to the city's 'cultural workforce'".

Kelman was involved in the Edinburgh Unemployed Workers Centre, giving a speech at its opening, and he has expressed support for the Autonomous Centre of Edinburgh (ACE), its successor organisation.

Kelman has been a prominent campaigner, notably in issues of social justice and traditional left-wing causes, although he is resolutely not a party man, and remains at his heart a libertarian socialist anarchist, saying "the parliamentary opposition parties are essential to the political apparatus of this country which is designed to arrest justice".

In 1990, Kelman took part in an evening of international prose readings at the ninth International Book Fair of Radical Black and Third World Books, subsequently joining the Book Fair's organising committee and establishing the associated Scottish Book Fair of Radical Black and Third World Books, held in Glasgow, 1993 and 1995.

In his introduction to Born up a Close: Memoirs of a Brigton Boy (2006), an edition of Glaswegian political campaigner Hugh Savage's writings, Kelman sums up his understanding of the history of national and class conflict as follows:

In an occupied country indigenous history can only be radical. It is a class issue. The intellectual life of working-class people is 'occupied'. In a colonised country intellectual occupation takes place throughout society. The closer to the ruling class we get the less difference there exists in language and culture, until finally we find that questions fundamental to society at its widest level are settled by members of the same closely knit circle, occasionally even the same family or 'bloodline'. And the outcome of that can be war, the slaughter of working-class people.

Despite reservations about nationalism, Kelman has voiced his support for Scottish independence, stating: "Any form of nationalism is dangerous, and should be treated with caution. I cannot accept nationalism and I am not a Scottish Nationalist. But once that is said, I favour a Yes or No decision on independence and I shall vote Yes to independence." He has voiced criticism of Scottish arts funding council Creative Scotland.

== Personal life ==
In 1969, Kelman married Marie Connors from South Wales. He lives in Glasgow with his wife and their children, and has also lived in London, Manchester, the Channel Islands, Australia and America.

== Bibliography ==
=== Short story collections ===
- An Old Pub Near The Angel (1973)
- Three Glasgow Writers (1976, with Alex Hamilton and Tom Leonard)
- Short Tales from the Night Shift (1978)
- Not Not While The Giro (1983)
- Lean Tales (1985, with Alasdair Gray and Agnes Owens)
- Greyhound for Breakfast (1987) (winner of the Cheltenham Prize for Literature)
- The Burn (1991)
- Seven Stories (CD audio recording read by Kelman, AK Press, 1996)
- The Good Times (1998)
- Where I Was (selection of stories from Lean Tales; Penguin, 2005).
- If It Is Your Life (2010)
- A Lean Third (2014)
- That Was a Shiver (2017)
- Tales of Here & Then (2020)
- Keep Moving and No Questions (PM Press, 2023)
- The Story of Stone: Tales, Entreaties, and Incantations (PM Press, 2025)

=== Novels ===
- The Busconductor Hines (1984)
- A Chancer (1985)
- A Disaffection (1989)
- How Late It Was, How Late (1994) (winner of the Booker Prize)
- Translated Accounts (2001)
- You Have to Be Careful in the Land of the Free (2004)
- Kieron Smith, Boy (2008)
- Mo Said She Was Quirky (2012; ISBN 978-0141041612)
- Dirt Road (2016; ISBN 978-1782118251)
- God's Teeth and Other Phenomena (PM Press, 2022; ISBN 9781629639390)

=== Essays and interviews ===
- Some Recent Attacks: Essays Cultural & Political. Stirling: AK Press. 1992. p. 92. ISBN 1-873176-80-5.
- "And the Judges Said..." Essays (Edinburgh: Birlinn, 2002; ISBN 9780857901415)
- The Freedom to Think Kurdistan (thi wurd, 2019)
- With Noam Chomsky, Between Thought and Expression Lies a Lifetime: Why Ideas Matter (PM Press, 2021)
- The State Is the Enemy: Essays on Liberation and Racial Justice (PM Press, 2023)
- All We Have Is the Story: Selected Interviews (1973–2022) (PM Press, 2023)
- Book launch interview for Between Thought and Expression Lies a Lifetime: Why Ideas Matter with James Kelman and Noam Chomsky. (A Radcial Guide, 2021)

=== Plays ===
- Hardie and Baird & Other Plays (1991)

=== Memoir ===
- What I Do (2020)

=== As editor ===
- An East End Anthology, ed. Jim Kelman (1988)
- Hugh Savage, Born up a Close: Memoirs of a Brigton boy, ed. James Kelman (2006)

== Awards and honours ==
- 1987: Cheltenham Prize for Literature (Greyhound for Breakfast)
- 1989: James Tait Black Memorial Prize (A Disaffection)
- 1994: Booker Prize (How Late It Was, How Late)
- 1994: Writers’ Guild Award for Best Fiction (How Late It Was, How Late)
- 1998: Glenfiddich Spirit of Scotland Award
- 1998: Stakis Prize for Scottish Writer of the Year (The Good Times)
- 2009: Scottish Arts Council Book of the Year Award (Kieron Smith, Boy)
- 2009: Aye Write Prize (Kieron Smith, Boy)
- 2009: Saltire Award (Kieron Smith, Boy)
- 2024: Saltire Society Lifetime Achievement Award
