= And the Judges Said =

2002 collection of essays by James Kelman

- Author: James Kelman
- Language: English
- Genre: Essays
- Publisher: Secker & Warburg
- Publication date: 2002
- Publication place: England
- Media type: Print

And the Judges Said is a collection of essays by the Scottish writer James Kelman published in 2002.

The book contains a speech given by Kelman during the opening of the Edinburgh Unemployed Workers Centre (now the Autonomous Centre of Edinburgh), a far-left political organisation and social centre based in Edinburgh. At the core of the collection is an extended essay on Franz Kafka.
