= John Austen (illustrator) =

British book illustrator

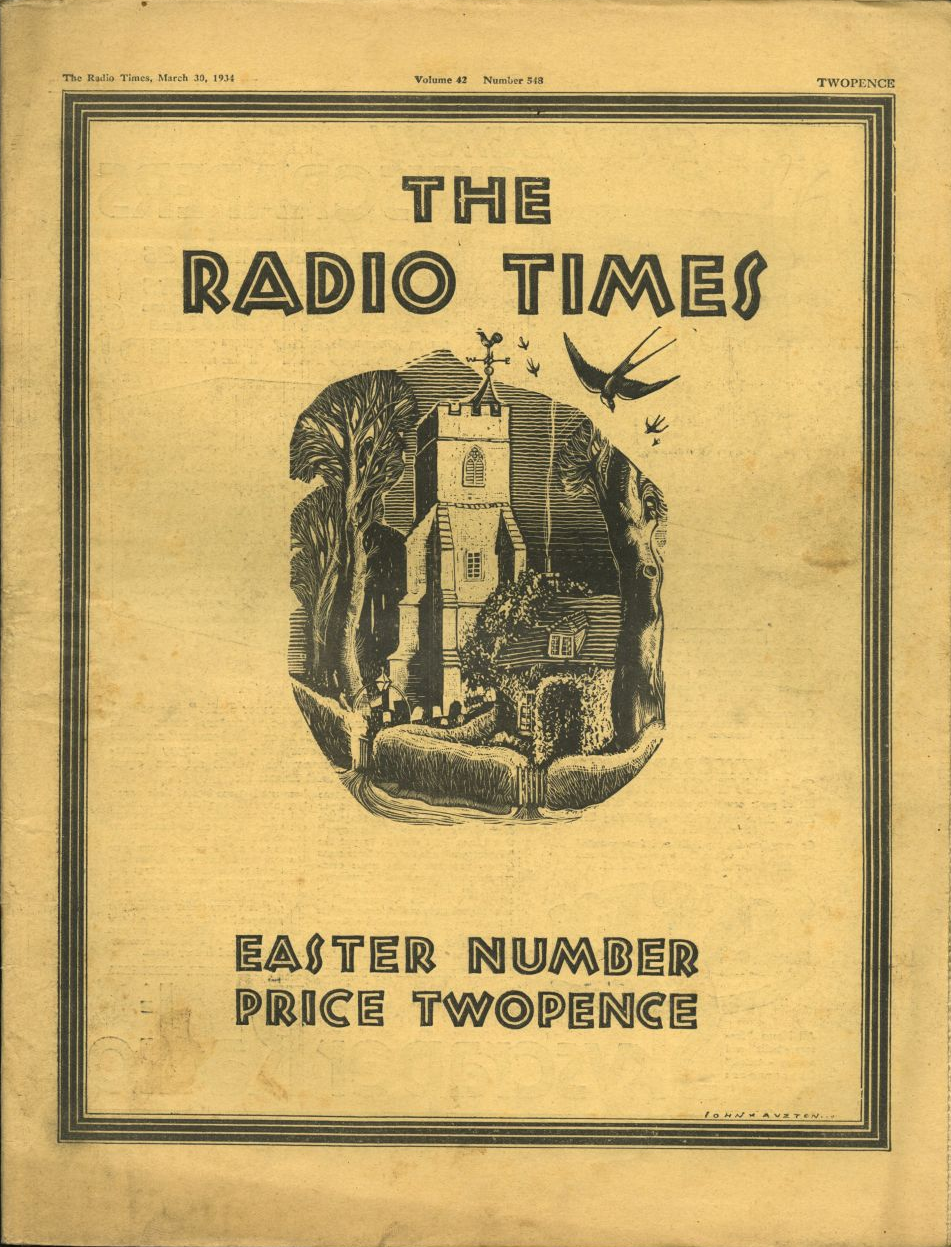
Radio Times – front cover of 1934 Easter edition

John Archibald Austen (5 January 1886 in Dover, (Kent) – 27 October 1948 in Hythe, Kent) was a British book illustrator.

== Profile ==
Austen moved to London in 1906, where he studied art. His early works, including an illustrated Hamlet were Beardsleyesque in style. After 1925 he was influenced by Art Deco. Books Austen illustrated in this manner include Daphnis and Chloe and a printed version of As You Like it. His work for Radio Times includes the cover of the Easter 1934 edition.

Austen used several techniques in his illustrations, including wood engraving and scraperboard, and changed styles to suit the text he was illustrating. He was also involved in advertising, producing adverts, several posters & numerous dust jacket designs. He was a friend of Alan Odle and Harry Clarke and exhibited with them at the St George's Gallery in 1925.

== Works concerning him ==
The novelist Dorothy Richardson, wrote about him in John Austen and the Inseparables (London: William Jackson, 1930).

Issue 27 of The Imaginative Book Illustration Society's Studies in Illustration contains a biography and full bibliography by Martin Steenson.

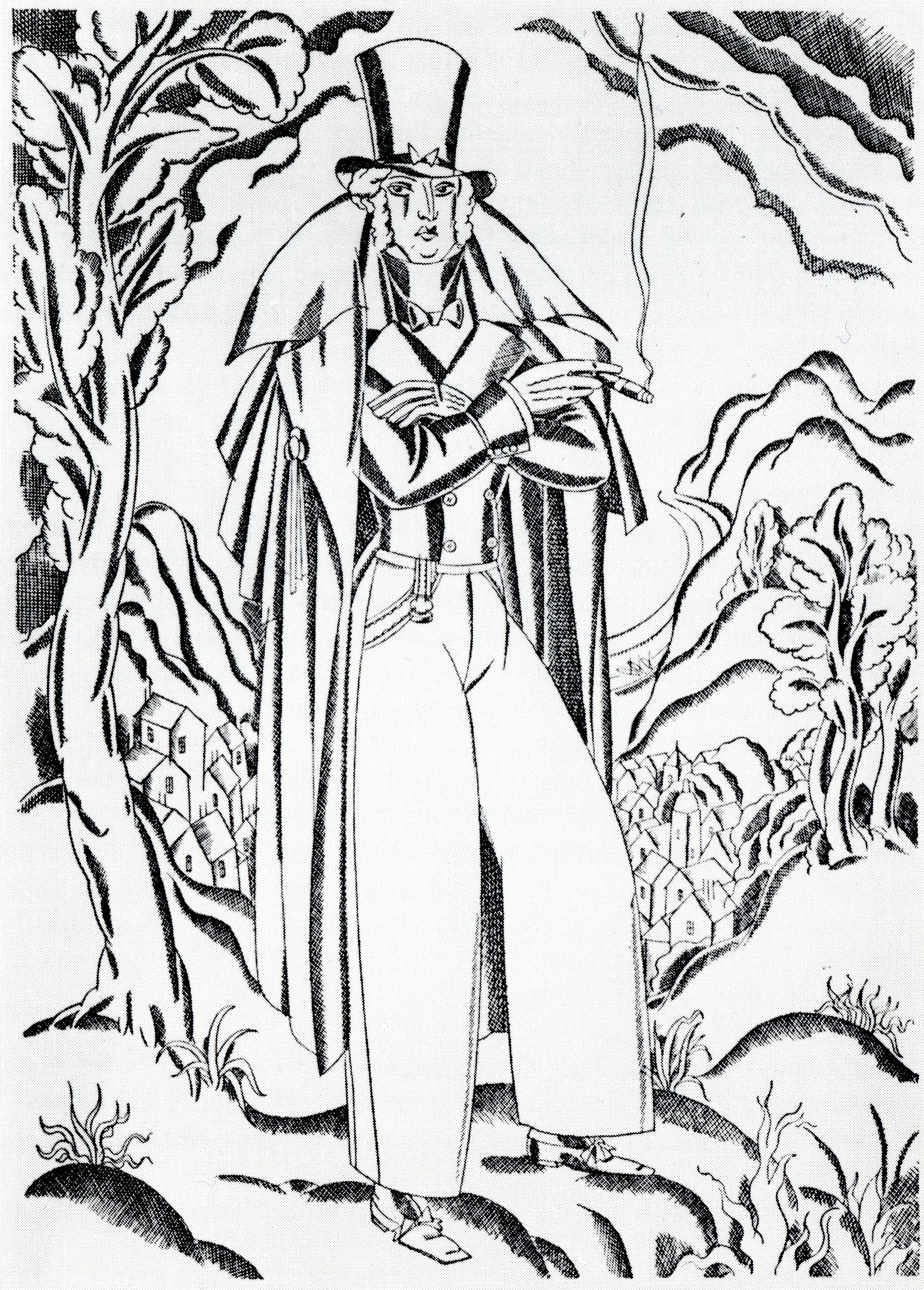
John Austen illustration for 'The infernal marriage' by Benjamin Disraeli (1929)

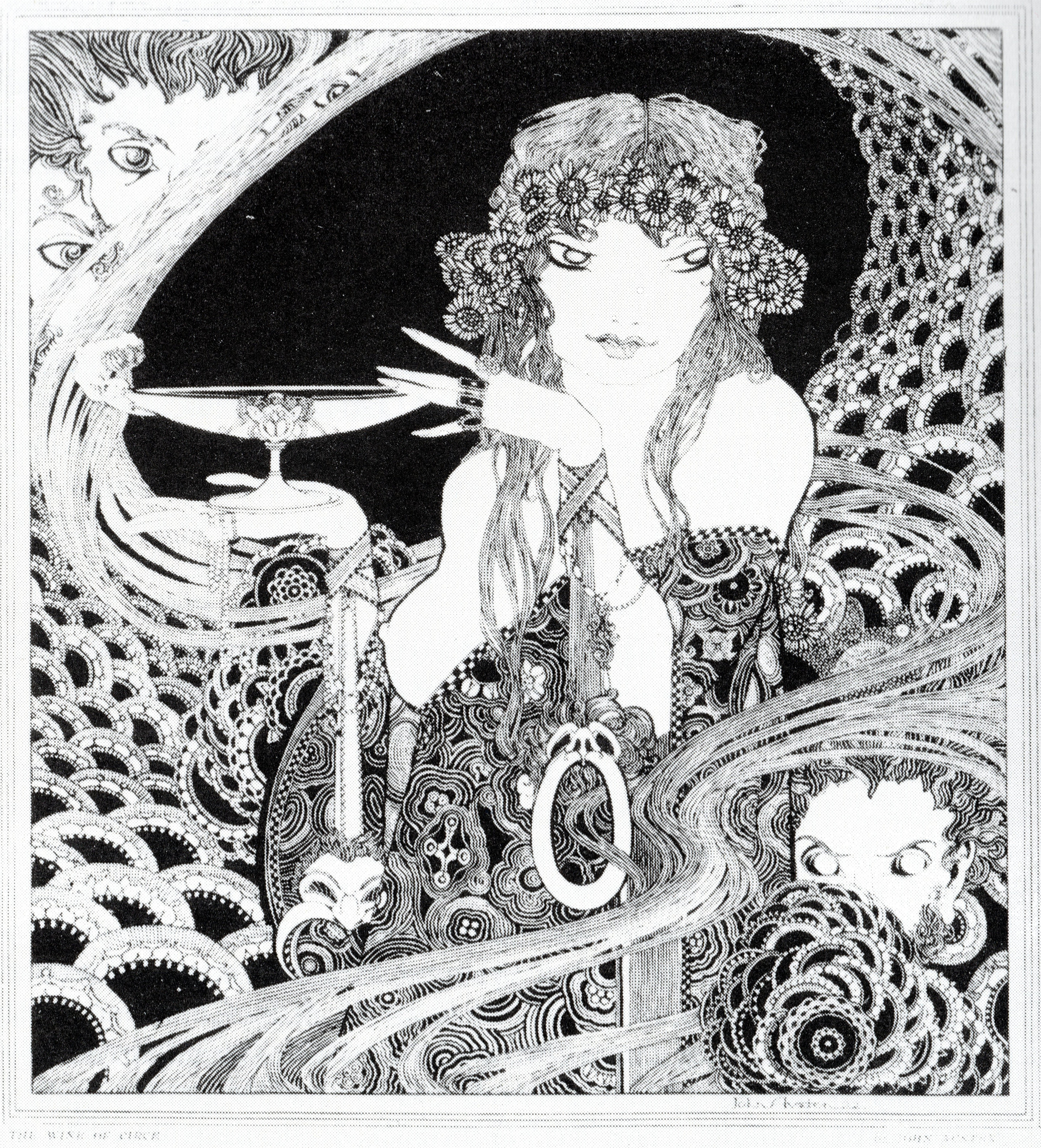
John Austen illustration The Wine of Circe from 'The golden hind vol. 1 no. 2 (1923)

== Books illustrated and/or authored by him ==
- Ralph Holbrook Keenm, The Little Ape and Other Stories (Henderson, 1921)
- Hugh L’Anson Fausset, The Condemned and The Mercy of God: Two Poems of Crisis (Selwyn & Blount, 1922)
- Edward Cracroft Lefroy, Echoes from Theocritus (Selwyn & Blount, 1922)
- Charles Perrault, Tales of Passed Times (Selwyn & Blount, 1922)
- William Shakespeare, Hamlet (Selwyn & Blount, 1922)
- Francis Lawrence Bickley, The Adventures of Harlequin (Selwyn & Blount, 1923)
- Jose Maria De Eca De Queiroz, Perfection (Selwyn & Blount, 1923)
- Thomas Moult (editor), The Best Poems of 1922 (Cape, 1923)
- James Murray Allison, The Five Black Cousins and Other Bird Rhymes (Cape, 1924)
- John Austen, Rogues in Porcelain, A Miscellany of 18th Poems (Chapman & Hall, 1924)
- Benjamin Disraeli, Ixion in Heaven (Cape, 1925)
- Anon, Everyman and Other Plays (Chapman & Hall, 1925)
- Longus, Daphnis and Chloe (Bles, 1925)
- Thomas Moult (editor), The Best Poems of 1925 (Cape, 1925)
- Lord Byron, Don Juan (Bodley Head, 1926)
- Anatole France, The Gods Are Athirst (Bodley Head, 1926 & 1933)
- Laurence Sterne, Tristram Shandy (Bodley Head, 1927)
- Gustave Flaubert, Madame Bovary (Bodley Head, 1928)
- L’Abbe Prevost, Manon Lescaut (Bles, 1928)
- Thomas Moult (editor), The Best Poems of 1928 (Cape, 1928)
- Daniel Defoe, Moll Flanders (Bodley Head, 1929)
- Benjamin Disraeli, The Infernal Marriage (William Jackson, 1929)
- Norman Douglas, South Wind (two volumes) (Angus Book Shop, 1929)
- Thomas Moult (editor), The Best Poems of 1929 (Cape. 1929)
- H. E. Bates, The Hessian Prisoner (William Jackson, 1930)
- Villiers David, The Guardsman and Cupid's Daughter (Cayme Press, 1930)
- William Shakespeare, As You Like It (William Jackson, 1930)
- Pierre Louys, The Collected Tales of Pierre Louys (Chicago: Argus Books, 1930)
- Alfred Benjamin Cooper, Poets in Pinafores: Being Nursery Rhymes Rewritten (Alston Rivers, 1931)
- William Makepeace Thackeray, Vanity Fair (novel)|Vanity Fair (Limited Editions Club NY, 1931)
- Dorothy Una Ratcliffe: The Gypsy Dorelia: A Pay in 3 Acts (Bodley Head, 1932)
- Charles Dickens, The Pickwick Club (Limited Editions Club NY, 1933)*
- C. C. & D. G., The English in Love (Secker, 1933)
- C. C. & D. G., A National Gallery, Being a Collection of English Characters (Secker, 1934)
- Charles Dickens, David Copperfield (NY: Heritage, 1935)
- Tobias Smollett, The Adventures of Peregrine Pickle (Limited Editions Club NY, 1936)
- Aristophanes, The Frogs (Limited Editions Club NY, 1937) (NY: Heritage, 1959)
- Alaine-Rene LeSage, The Adventures of Gil Blas (Limited Editions Club NY, 1937)
- John Austen, The ABC of Pen and Ink Rendering (Pitman, 1937)
- Oliver Goldsmith, Oliver Wakefield (NY: Heritage, 1939)
- William Shakespeare, Comedy of Errors (Limited Editions Club NY, 1939)
- Arnold Bennett, The Old Wives' Tale (Limited Editions Club NY, 1941)
- Frederick George Thomas, The Village (OUP, 1943)
- Jane Austen, Persuasion (Avalon Press. 1946)
- Edmund Spenser, The Faerie Queen (two volumes) (Limited Editions Club NY, 1953)
