= Translated Accounts =

2001 novel by James Kelman

- First edition
- Author: James Kelman
- Language: English
- Publisher: Secker & Warburg
- Publication date: 2001
- Publication place: Scotland
- Media type: Print

Translated Accounts is a novel by the Scottish writer James Kelman published in 2001 by Secker & Warburg.

== Critical reception ==
The reviewer for The Observer wrote: "This novel marks a change of direction for Kelman, in that it shifts away from his immediate locality to stake out an unnamed, almost abstract terrain; the linguistic power struggle remains a constant, however. ...This book has been seven years in the writing, and you are made to feel the weight of that work in almost every line."
