= Alan Odle =

English illustrator

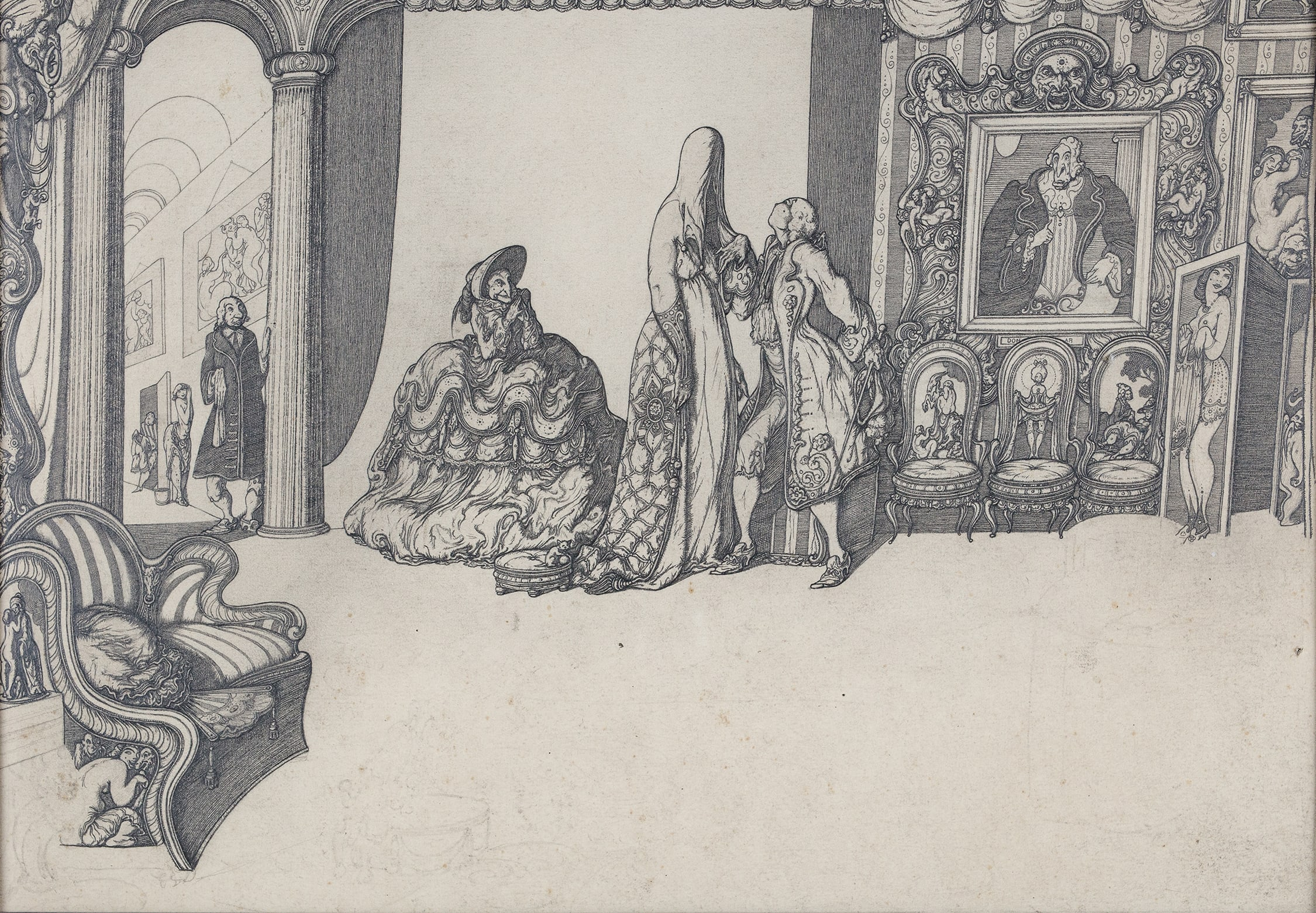
Study for Voltaire's Candide, by Odle

Alan Elsden Odle (1888–1948) was an English illustrator, husband of the English novelist Dorothy Richardson, whom he married in 1917. (He used his birth name Allan up until about 1915 but then used Alan for the rest of his life). His style was a precursor of surrealism. He illustrated an English edition of Voltaire's Candide (G. Routledge, 1922), Mark Twain's 1601: A Tudor Fireside Conversation (London: Printed for Subscribers only, 1936), and The Mimiambs of Herondas. He also designed the dust jacket for James Hanley's Ebb and Flow (London: John Lane, 1932), other Hanley novels for Lane, and Dorothy Richardson's Backwater (1916). He contributed to a number of periodicals such as The Gypsy, The Golden Hind (1922–25), the US Vanity Fair, The Studio, and the UK Argosy.

Odle was a bohemian who associated with an artistic circle that included Augustus John, Jacob Epstein, and Wyndham Lewis. When he married Dorothy Richardson he was tubercular and an alcoholic, and was not expected to live long. However, he stopped drinking and lived until 1948. Odle was very thin and "over six feet tall with waist-length hair wound around the outside of his head", which he never cut. He also rarely cut his fingernails. From 1917 until 1939, the couple spent their winters in Cornwall and their summers in London; and then stayed permanently in Cornwall until Odle's death in 1948. Richardson supported herself and her husband with freelance writing for periodicals for many years, as Alan made little money from his art.

Alan Odle's brother was Edwin Vincent Odle (1890–1942), author of the minor science fiction classic The Clockwork Man (1923), and Odle was a friend and correspondent of the writer Claude Houghton.

The film director and Python Terry Gilliam is a connoisseur of his work.

== Bibliography (secondary sources) ==
- There is an article on him by Martin Steenson in the Antiquarian Book Monthly Review, October 1979.
- The Imaginative Book Illustration Society at has a bibliography of the published drawings compiled by Martin Steenson: Studies in Illustration, Issue 9, Summer 1998.
- Martin Steenson has also published a book on Odle, The Life and Work of Alan Odle (Stroud: Books & Things, 2012),126 pages, ISBN 978-0-9544395-1-4 (includes a full bibliography) . Review by George H. Thomson in Pilgrimages: The Journal of Dorothy Richardson Studies Number 5, 2012
- Herbert B. Grimsditch, "Mr. Alan Odle: A Master of the Grotesque", The Studio, London, England, 1 January 1928, Volume 95, no.418, p. 23.
- "An Exhibition by Three Book Illustrators: John Austen, Harry Clarke and Alan Odle", The Studio, London, England, 15 May 1925, Volume 89, no.386, p. 261
