= Kieron Smith, Boy =

2008 novel by James Kelman

- First edition
- Author: James Kelman
- Language: English
- Publisher: Hamish Hamilton
- Publication date: 2008
- Publication place: Scotland
- Media type: Print
- Pages: 422

Kieron Smith, Boy is a novel by the Scottish writer James Kelman published in 2008 by Hamish Hamilton.

== Critical reception ==
Michel Faber wrote in The Guardian, "Kieron Smith, Boy is the monologue of an unexceptional, inarticulate lad growing up in Glasgow's poorer neighbourhoods. The boy's voice is utterly, mercilessly authentic. ...James Kelman remains one of the most distinctive writers in Britain."

The reviewer in The Independent stated: "If you want novels with turning-points, pots of gold at the end of the rainbow, the marriage of a heroine, the restoration of the status quo, or any other sort of overarching narrative structure to make you feel cosy, don't look to James Kelman. You will find more awkward adventure in Kelman's meticulous commitment to the common experiences of ordinary life – all conveyed in playful, accessible language from a particular voice and a particular place. In this, Kelman is in a league of his own. This is an outstanding novel of immense power, and is Kelman's best yet."

== Awards ==
Kieron Smith, Boy won the Saltire Society's Book of the Year and the Scottish Arts Council Book of the Year.
