= Mo Said She Was Quirky =

2012 novel by James Kelman

- Author: James Kelman
- Publisher: Hamish Hamilton
- Publication date: 2 August 2012
- ISBN: 9780241144565

Mo Said She Was Quirky is a novel by James Kelman first published in 2012 by Hamish Hamilton. This novel is Kelman's first that is set in London, and also his first to feature a female principal character.

== Plot ==
The novel is about Helen, a 27-year-old Glaswegian, who lives in London and works in a casino. Helen has one daughter, Sophie, from a previous relationship, and she lives with her boyfriend Mo, whose family is from Pakistan.

At the start of the story, Helen is taking a taxi-ride home from work. She sees a homeless person walking past who she thinks is her brother Brian. The novel then follows Helen for the next 24 hours of her life.

== Reception ==
Writing in The Guardian, Adam Mars-Jones highlights what he sees as a lack of concrete details provided in Kelman's writing, which he likens to "The semi-arid ecology of Beckett's novels".

Boyd Tonkin of The Independent writes that Helen's casino workplace is "both a metaphor for winner-takes-all metropolitan life and keenly observed real workplace". He continues: "Kelman brings gentle humour and profound compassion to his tale of getting by in an unjust time and place."
