= The Burn (short story collection) =

1991 short story collection by James Kelman

- First edition
- Author: James Kelman
- Language: English
- Genre: Short stories
- Publisher: Secker & Warburg
- Publication date: 1991
- Publication place: England
- Media type: Print

The Burn is a collection of short stories by the Scottish writer James Kelman, first published in 1991.

== Contents ==
- "Pictures"
- "A walk in the park"
- "A situation"
- "Cronies"
- "Fr Fitzmichael"
- "Street-sweeper"
- "Margaret’s away somewhere"
- "A Memory"
- "A player"
- "Naval History"
- "That thread"
- "From the Window"
- "Sarah Crosbie"
- "That’s where I’m at"
- "the Hon"
- "Unlucky"
- "A woman and two men"
- "Lassies are trained that way"
- "Real Stories"
- "A decision"
- "the chase"
- "it’s the ins and outs"
- "The small bird and the young person"
- "the Christmas shopping"
- "events in yer life"
- "by the burn"
