= Pointed Roofs =

1915 novel by Dorothy Richardson

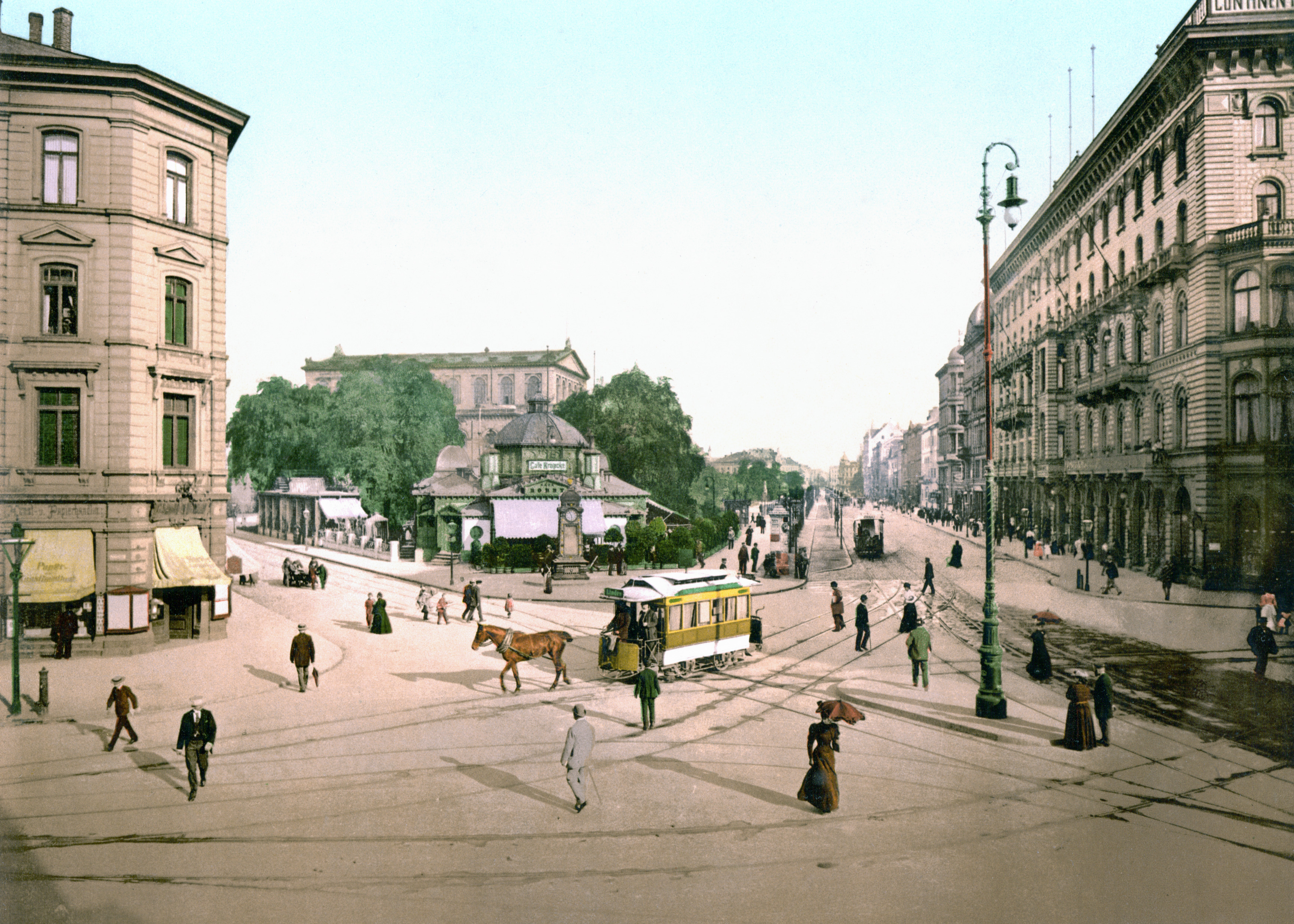
- Am Kröpcke, the centre of the city of Hanover, in 1895. Richardson was there in 1891.
- Author: Dorothy Richardson
- Language: English
- Genre: Novel
- Publisher: Duckworth
- Publication date: 1915
- Publication place: England
- Followed by: Backwater

Pointed Roofs, published in 1915, is the first work (she called it a "chapter") in Dorothy Richardson's series of 13 semi-autobiographical novels titled Pilgrimage, and the first complete stream of consciousness novel published in English. The novelist May Sinclair (1863–1946) first applied the term "stream of consciousness" in a review of Pointed Roofs (The Egoist April 1918).

Miriam Henderson, the central character in Pilgrimage, is based on the author's own life between 1891 and 1915. In Pointed Roofs, seventeen-year-old Miriam Henderson has her first adventure as an adult teaching English at a finishing school in Hanover, Germany. Richardson herself had left home in 1891, at seventeen, to take up the post of student teacher at a school in Hanover, because of her father's financial problems.

== Bibliography ==
- Pointed Roofs, London: Duckworth, 1915. Online text at Pointed Roofs: Pilgrimage, Volume 1
