= How Late It Was, How Late =

1994 novel by James Kelman

- First edition
- Author: James Kelman
- Language: English
- Publisher: Secker and Warburg
- Publication date: March 1994
- Publication place: Scotland
- Media type: Print (hardback & paperback)
- Pages: 384 pp
- ISBN: 0-7493-9883-3
- OCLC: 32131487

How Late It Was, How Late is a 1994 stream-of-consciousness novel written by Scottish writer James Kelman. The Glasgow-centred work is written in a working-class Scottish dialect, and follows Sammy, a shoplifter and ex-convict.

It won the 1994 Booker Prize.

== Plot summary ==
Sammy awakens in a lane one morning after a two-day drinking binge, and gets into a fight with some plainclothes policemen, called in Glaswegian dialect "sodjers". When he regains consciousness, he finds that he has been beaten severely and, he gradually realises, is completely blind. The plot of the novel follows Sammy as he explores and comes to terms with his new-found disability and the difficulties this brings.

Upon being released, Sammy goes back to his house and realises that his girlfriend, Helen, is gone. He assumes that she took off because of the fight they had before Sammy last left his house, but makes no attempt to find her.

For a while, Sammy struggles with the simple tasks that blindness makes difficult. Soon, Sammy realises he will need something to indicate his blindness to other people. He cuts the head off an old mop and, with the help of his neighbour, Boab, paints it white. He also purchases a pair of sunglasses to cover his eyes.

Eventually, Sammy finds himself at the Central Medical waiting to get checked out for his blindness. He is instructed to the Dysfunctional Benefits floor and is questioned by a young lady who asks Sammy questions about his blindness. Sammy tells her about being beaten up by the cops, but immediately regrets telling her this and tries to take it back. She informs him that she cannot remove his statement from the record, but he can clarify if he wishes to. This upsets Sammy and he leaves the Central Medical without finishing filing for dysfunctional benefits.

Once home Sammy decides to calm down by taking a bath. While in the bathtub Sammy hears someone enter his flat. When he goes to investigate he is cuffed by police and taken to the department. They question him about the Saturday before Sammy went blind, and about the Leg (an old friend/associate). Sammy cannot remember much about that Saturday but admits to having met up with his friends Billy and Tam. Sammy says he can remember nothing else, so they throw him in a cell.

Later, Sammy is released for his doctor's appointment. The doctor asks Sammy a series of questions about his vision, and in the end, refuses to diagnose Sammy as blind. Upon leaving the doctor's office, a young man, Ally, approaches Sammy. He seems to know all about how the doctor will not give out diagnoses and persuades Sammy that he should be his representation for a commission payment.

Bored at home, Sammy decides to go down to Quinn's bar, the bar Helen worked at. Sammy gets his neighbour, Boab, to call him a taxi to take him to the city centre. At the door of Quinn's bar, Sammy is told by two men that there is a promotion going on inside and Sammy cannot go in. Sammy gets upset at this and asks about Helen. The men tell Sammy that no one by the name of "Helen" has ever worked there. Upset, Sammy walks to Glancy's bar—his favourite hang out—and is approached by his old friend Tam. Tam is upset because Sammy gave his name to the police and now his family is being affected by it. Angry, Tam leaves Sammy who wonders what is going on.

Later, Ally sends over Sammy's son, Peter, to take pictures of the marks Sammy has from being beaten by the police. Peter arrives with his friend, Keith, and offers to give Sammy money. Sammy refuses the money but Peter keeps pestering him about it. Eventually, Sammy agrees to take the money and meets with Peter and Keith at a nearby pub. After Peter leaves Sammy takes the money, flags a taxi, and leaves.

== Booker Prize ==
The book, amid some controversy, won the 1994 Booker Prize, making Kelman the first Scottish writer to win the award. One of the judges, Rabbi Julia Neuberger, allegedly threatened to resign from the judging panel if the book was selected as the winner, and is widely quoted as having said, "Frankly, it's crap." Neuberger described the Booker decision as a "disgrace" and said: "I'm really unhappy. Kelman is deeply inaccessible for a lot of people. I am implacably opposed to the book. I feel outmanoeuvred."

Simon Jenkins, a conservative columnist for The Times, called the award "literary vandalism". In his acceptance speech, Kelman countered the criticism and decried its basis as suspect, making the case for the culture and language of "indigenous" people outside London. "A fine line can exist between elitism and racism," he said. "On matters concerning language and culture, the distinction can sometimes cease to exist altogether."

Kingsley Amis took offence to the book in his book The King's English. In a section on "Four-letter Words", Amis contests that "The thinning-out of spoken ribaldry" is a bad thing for the worlds of literature, art, comedy, and culture. Amis said: "An entire way of being funny, an entire range of humorous effects, has been impoverished, except probably on the lower deck of society. At first sight, the case with the printed four-letter word is different, though here I detect a similarly unwelcome drift towards serious aesthetic purpose. A bit of that can be seen in one of the last and least of the big fuck-novels, the winner of the 1994 Booker Prize. The doggedness with which the author keeps on trotting out the great word and its various derivatives already has something old-fashioned about it. Time for a change."

In 2020, Douglas Stuart – the second Scottish writer to win the Booker Prize with his novel Shuggie Bain – said: "How Late It Was How Late by James Kelman changed my life. It is such a bold book, the prose and stream of consciousness is really inventive. But it is also one of the first times I saw my people, my dialect, on the page."
