= Pilgrimage (novel sequence) =

Book series by Dorothy Richardson

Pilgrimage is a novel sequence by the British author Dorothy Richardson, from the first half of the 20th century. It comprises 13 volumes, including a final posthumous volume. It is now considered a significant work of literary modernism. Richardson's own term for the volumes was "chapters".

== Overview ==
Miriam Henderson, the central character in the Pilgrimage novel sequence, is based on the author's own life between 1891 and 1915. Pilgrimage was read as a work of fiction and "its critics did not suspect that its content was a reshaping of DMR's own experience", nor that it was a roman à clef.

Miriam, like Richardson, "is the third of four daughters [whose] parents had longed for a boy and had treated her as if she fulfilled that expectation". This upbringing is reflected in Miriam's "strong ambivalence toward her role as a woman". Dorothy Richardson had the same ambivalence.

== Content ==
The first novel Pointed Roofs (1915), is set in 1893. At 17 years old Miriam Henderson, as Richardson herself did, teaches English at a finishing school in Hanover, Germany. Both author and character have to do this because of their father's financial problems. The following year, 1916, Richardson published Backwater, where Miriam "works as resident governess in a school frequented by the daughters of the North London middle class".

Honeycomb was published in 1917. Saturday Review commented, "Miss Richardson is not without talent but it is the talent of neurasthenia." And that the "only living thing in the book" is "the morbid and self-conscious mind [of the heroine]." In this novel Miriam works as a governess to the two children of the Corrie family during 1895. Mr. Corrie is a successful lawyer. Honeycomb ends with the suicide of Miriam's mother. Events in this novel again parallel Dorothy Richardson's own life: her mother committed suicide in 1895.

The fourth part, The Tunnel, appeared in 1919. In it Miriam starts on a more independent life when she takes a room in Bloomsbury in central London at 21, and works as a receptionist at a dental surgery. These are events again parallel Dorothy Richardson's life. Olive Heseltine described the novel to be "simply life. Shapeless, trivial, pointless, boring, beautiful, curious, profound. And above all, absorbing." On the other hand, an "elderly male reviewer," for The Spectator found it disturbing that "Miss Richardson is not concerned with the satisfaction of the average reader".

Interim, published 1920, is Richardson's fifth novel and was serialized in Little Review, along with James Joyce's Ulysses in 1919. While New York Times Book Review admits that Richardson has "talent," her heroine "is not particularly interesting" and this novel would be "probably ... almost unintelligible" to those who have not a "close acquaintance" her previous novels in the sequence. Much of the action in this chapter of Pilgrimage takes place in Miriam's lodgings.

The sixth section of Pilgrimage, Deadlock, appeared in 1921. Una Hunt, in a review for The New Republic, referred to her "intense excitement in reading this novel," and calls Deadlock "an experience rather than a book." Richardson's interest in philosophical theories and ideas is central to Deadlock, though "metaphysical questions about the nature of being and of reality pervade Pilgrimage as a whole", In Deadlock, however, "Richardson first shows philosophical ideas and inquiry taking persistent and organized shape in Miriam’s maturing thought", when she "attends a course of introductory lectures by the British Idealist philosopher John Ellis McTaggart", with her fellow lodger Michael Shatov, She discusses with him "the ideas of Herbert Spencer, Ralph Waldo Emerson, Benedict de Spinoza and Friedrich Nietzsche" amongst other things. Shatov is based on Benjamin Grad, the son of a Jewish lawyer in Russia, who lived in 1896 in the same lodging as Richardson on Endesleigh Street, Bloomsbury, London. Grad asked Richardson to marry him but she turned him down.

Revolving Lights was published in 1923, and in it Miriam's friendship continues with Michael Shatov, though she has rejected marriage. Miriam also has a long holiday at the seaside home of Hypo and Alma Wilson, who are based on H. G. Wells and his wife Amy. In 1925 the eighth volume appeared, The Trap. Miriam moves into a flat, which she shares with a Miss Holland. The title reflects that this is not a successful venture.

Oberland was published in 1928 and depicts a fortnight spent by Miriam in the Bernese Oberland, in the Swiss Alps, based on Richardson's 1904 holiday there. It "focuses on the experience and influence of travel and new surroundings, celebrating a state of intense wonder—'the strange happiness of being abroad.'" The tenth part of Pilgrimage, Dawn's Left Hand, was published in 1931. In this novel Miriam has an affair with Hypo Wilson that leads to a pregnancy and miscarriage, based on Richardson's affair with H. G. Wells around 1907. Sex is a dominant concern of this work. Miriam's women friend Amabel writes “I love you” with a piece of soap on Miriam's mirror, which leaves Miriam wondering if she can reciprocate. Amabel was based on Veronica Leslie-Jones, an activist and suffragette who married Benjamin Grad.

Another four years passed before part 11 of Pilgrimage, Clear Horizon, was published in 1935. In it Miriam's relationship with Amabel continues. Dimple Hill was published in 1938 as part of a four volume Collected Edition, It was the last volume of Pilgrimage published during Dorothy Richardson's life. The edition was publicized as a complete work in twelve parts by the publisher.

In 1946 Richardson published, in Life and Letters, three chapters from "A Work in Progress", and when she died left an incomplete manuscript of the 13th "chapter" of Pilgrimage, March Moonlight, published with a new Complete Edition, in 1967. There is brief description of Miriam meeting a Mr Noble, which is based on Dorothy Richardson's meeting in 1915 with Alan Odle, the artist son of a bank manager, who became her husband in 1917. They both lived in the same lodging house in St John's Wood, London in 1915.

== Style ==
In a 1918 review, May Sinclair pointed to Richardson's characteristic use of free indirect speech in narrative. From early in the Pilgrimage sequence, she applied it in a stream of consciousness. It has been argued that Richardson's style is more appropriately compared with that of Henry James, rather than the more usual parallels made with James Joyce and Virginia Woolf.
