= A Disaffection =

1989 novel by James Kelman

- First edition
- Author: James Kelman
- Language: Scots
- Publisher: Secker and Warburg
- Publication date: 1989
- Publication place: Scotland
- Media type: Print (hardback & paperback)
- Pages: 337 pp

A Disaffection is a novel written by Scottish writer James Kelman, first published in 1989 by Secker and Warburg. Set in Glasgow, it is written in Scots using a stream-of-consciousness style, centring on a 29-year-old schoolteacher named Patrick Doyle. The novel won the James Tait Black Memorial Prize in 1989, and was shortlisted for the Booker Prize. In 2012, A Disaffection was shortlisted for the Best of the James Tait Black.

== Plot synopsis ==
The novel, written in a stream-of-consciousness style using the Glasgow dialect, concerns one week in the life of 29-year-old schoolteacher Patrick Doyle. Patrick is increasingly bitter about his entire life, despite feeling quite all right with the children he is coaching. He is in love with fellow schoolteacher Alison Houston, who is already married (without kids), and who rejects his advances. Midway in the novel, Patrick discovers he is to be transferred out of his present school which (his headmaster assures him) is the result of Patrick asking for a transfer, although Patrick has no recollection of such an act. The rest of the novel concerns Patrick's visit to his parents one weekend and, on a separate day, to his married elder brother Gavin's home.
