= Life and Letters =

Former English literary journal

Life and Letters was an English literary journal first published between June 1928 and April 1935.

The magazine was edited from first publication by Desmond MacCarthy after he lost interest in the New Statesman. It had financial backing from Lord Esher. In 1934, Ellis Roberts took over from MacCarthy.

Contributors to the magazine included H. E. Bates, Max Beerbohm, Hilaire Belloc, Kenneth Clark, Cyril Connolly, E. M. Forster, Thomas Hardy, F. L. Lucas, William Plomer, Peter Quennell, Dilys Powell, Lytton Strachey, Evelyn Waugh, Antonia White, and Virginia Woolf.

The magazine published a number of significant articles by Cyril Connolly, including "Conversations in Berlin", "The Position of Joyce" (April 1929), "England not my England" (October 1929) and "Under which King?" It was seen as a precursor to Connolly's Horizon.

The journal was revived in 1945 as Life and Letters and the London Mercury and Bookman before reverting to its original title the following year. It ceased publication in 1950.
