= Femke =

Feminine given name

- Pronunciation: Dutch: [ˈfɛmkə] West Frisian: [ˈfɛmkə]
- Gender: Feminine
- Languages: Dutch, West Frisian

Origin
- Language: West Frisian
- Derivation: Fem + ke
- Meaning: Little Fem
- Region of origin: Opsterland

Other names
- Variant forms: Famke, Feemke, Femkje, Femmeke, Femmetje, Femmigje, Fimke
- Derived: Fem, Femme

Femke (Dutch pronunciation: [ˈfɛmkə]) is a Dutch and West Frisian feminine given name of West Frisian origin. It means 'little Fem' and is derived from the name Femme. Originally from Friesland, the name Femke started to spread beyond this region around 1960, with peaks in popularity in 1980 and 2001. It is the name of over 26,000 women in the Netherlands and Belgium and can also be found in northwest Germany.

== Etymology ==
Femke was originally a West Frisian name from Opsterland and surroundings. Femke means 'little Fem': it is a diminutive, indicated by the suffix -ke, of the name Fem which is the feminine form of the West Frisian masculine name Femme. According to the Meertens Institute, Femme is probably a children's form for a two-part Germanic name with a first part Frede from the Proto-Germanic *friþu ('peace, protection') followed by a second part starting with the letter m, such as the name Fredemar meaning 'famous protector' from the Proto-Germanic *friþu and *mērija ('great, famous'). Variants of Femke and other feminine diminutives derived from Femme are Famke, Feemke, Femkje, Femmeke, Femmetje, Femmigje, and Fimke.

== Popularity ==
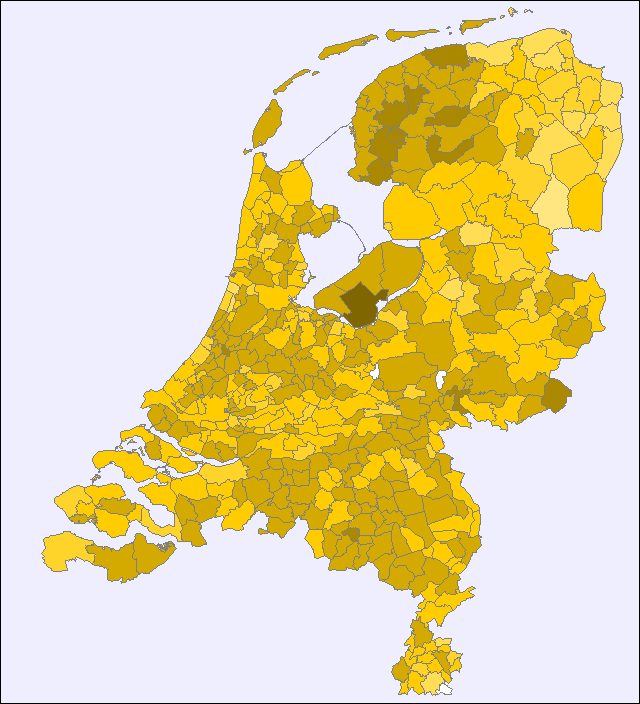
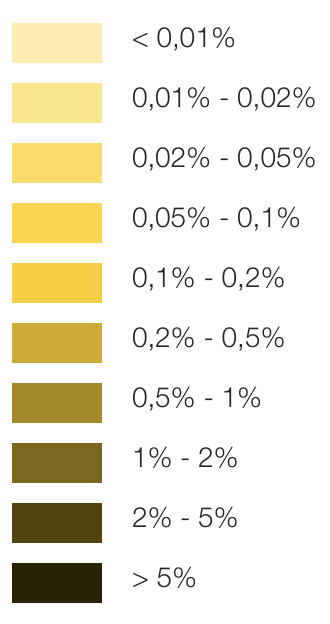
Map of the Netherlands with the relative distribution of the name Femke per municipality at the start of 2018

In the Netherlands, the name Femke was given to 0–12 newborns each year from 1790 until 1960, mainly in the northern province of Friesland where the West Frisian language is spoken, when the name started to gain popularity countrywide, which peaked in 1980 with 516 newborns and again in 2001 with 752 newborns. These peaks correspond with Dutch popularity trends of feminine given names ending in -ke, also including Maaike, Marieke, and Nienke. Academic researchers have investigated the peaks for Femke, but were unable to explain what caused them.

Femke has become the most-common feminine given name of West Frisian origin in the Netherlands. As of 2017, Femke was the first name of 18,929 women (0.2537%), making it the 56th-most-common feminine first name, and a middle name of 1,725 women (0.0233%) in the Netherlands; the municipality of Zeewolde had the highest percentage of women named Femke (1.0012%), followed by five municipalities in the province of Friesland with the next highest percentages (0.6025–0.8141%).

In Belgium, the popularity of the name Femke also peaked in 2001 with 369 newborns. As of 2022, Femke was the given name of 5,626 women (0.0948%) in Belgium, making it the 219th-most-common feminine given name in this country; 5,575 women named Femke (0.1629%) lived in Flanders, the Dutch-speaking northern portion of Belgium bordering the Netherlands, where it was the 113th-most-common feminine given name.

In Germany, there are no official statistics about given names. Based on information from over 450 German cities, a website about given names in Germany determined that Femke was most popular in the northwestern state of Lower Saxony, which is bordering the Netherlands, particularly in the region of East Frisia and the city of Papenburg.

== Notable people named Femke ==
Notable people with the first name Femke include:

- Femke Bastiaen (born 2001), Belgian footballer
- Femke Beuling (born 1999), Dutch speed skater and cyclist
- Femke Boelen (born 1968), Dutch rower
- Femke Boersma (1935–2026), Dutch actress
- Femke Broeders-Bol (born 2000), Dutch track and field athlete
- Femke Dekker (born 1979), Dutch rower
- Femke Diercks (born 1984), Dutch art historian and museum curator
- Femke Gerritse (born 2001), Dutch cyclist
- Femke Halsema (born 1966), Dutch politician
- Femke Heemskerk (born 1987), Dutch swimmer
- Femke Hermans (born 1990), Belgian boxer
- Femke Hiemstra (born 1974), Dutch painter
- Femke Huijzer (born 1999), Dutch fashion model
- Femke Kok (born 2000), Dutch speed skater
- Femke Kooijman (born 1978), Dutch field hockey player
- Femke Liefting (born 2005), Dutch footballer
- Femke Merel van Kooten (born 1983), Dutch politician
- Femke Maes (born 1980), Belgian footballer
- Femke Markus (born 1996), Dutch cyclist
- Femke Meines (born 2000), Dutch singer and actress
- Femke Pluim (born 1994), Dutch pole vaulter
- Femke Stoltenborg (born 1991), Dutch volleyball player
- Femke Van den Driessche (born 1996), Belgian cyclist
- Femke van Velzen (born 1980), Dutch documentary filmmaker
- Femke Verschueren (born 2000), Belgian singer
- Femke Verstichelen (born 1984), Belgian cyclist
- Femke de Vries (born 1994), Dutch cyclist
- Femke Wiersma (born 1984), Dutch politician
- Femke Wolting (born 1970), Dutch new media producer
- Femke Zeedijk (born 1974), Dutch politician
