= Klink =

Klink is a surname. Notable people with the surname include:

- Ab Klink (born 1958), Dutch politician and sociologist
- Al Klink (1915–1991), American jazz saxophonist
- Amyr Klink (born 1955), Brazilian explorer, sailor, and writer; father of Tamara (sailor)
- Anna Klink (born 1995), German footballer
- Else Klink (1907–1994), Papuan-born German anthroposophist dancer, choreographer, and teacher
- Ernst Klink (1923–1993), German military historian; son of Gurtrude
- Frieda Klink (1889–1948), American contralto
- Frans van der Klink (1928–1976), Dutch footballer
- Gertrud Scholtz-Klink (1902–1999), German National Socialist leader; mother of Ernst
- Ilse Klink (born 1972), South African actor and singer
- Jan Klink (born 1985), Dutch politician and dairy farmer
- Joanna Klink, American poet and academic
- Joe Klink (born 1962), American baseball player
- Leslie C. Klink (1926–2018), American politician and farmer
- Maaike van Klink (born 2000), Dutch footballer
- Martin Klink (born 1940), German swimmer
- Myriam Klink (born ?), Lebanese model, singer, activist, and politician
- Ron Klink (born 1951), American television broadcaster and politician
- Steve Klink (born ?), American composer and jazz pianist
- Tamara Klink (chess player) (born 1967), German and Kazakh chess grandmaster
- Tamara Klink (sailor) (born 1997), Brazilian sailor and writer; daughter of Amyr
- Vincent Klink (born 1949), German chef, restaurateur, author, and jazz flutist

== Fictional ==
- Colonel Klink, fictional character in the television series Hogan's Heroes
- Klink (Pokémon), a species from the Pokémon franchise

== See also ==
- Klink, Germany, a municipality in Mecklenburg-Vorpommern, Germany
- Klinck
- "Klink", the 7th track on Death Grips' 2011 mixtape Exmilitary
- "Klink", song by artist Smino
