= Tamara Klink =

Tamara Klink may refer to:

- Tamara Klink (chess player)
- Tamara Klink (sailor)
