= May 22 =

May 22 this year in various calendars
- Friday, 22 May 2026
Akan	Monofie
Armenian	6 Margach 1475
Aztec	Ochpaniztli 12, 3 Xōchitl
Babylonian	4 Ayaru, 2337 SE
Balinese pawukon	Menga, Kajeng, Menala, Wage, Maulu, Sukra of Wariga, Uma, Dadi, Pandita
Bengali	8 Joishtho, BS 1433
Chinese	Yang Fire Monkey・Ghost Mansion; Fire Horse Year, Month 4, Day 6 (Xiaoman, 14 days until Mangzhong)
Common Era	22 May 2026 CE
Coptic	14 Pashons, AM 1742
Egyptian	6 Phaophi, 2775 NE
Ethiopian	14 Genbot, 2018 Amätä Məhrät
French Republican	Décade I, Tridi de Prairial de l'Année 234 de la République
Gregorian	22 May, AD 2026
Hebrew	6 Sivan, AM 5786
Hindu	Puṣya・Vṛddhi; Solar: 8 Jyeṣṭha, 1948 SE; Lunisolar: Ṣaṣṭhī, Śukla pakṣa of Adhika Jyeṣṭha, 2083 VE; Rāudra・5127 KY・1,872,717
Icelandic	Föstudagur, 30 Harpa 2026
Islamic	5 Dhu al-Hijjah, AH 1447 (using tabular method)
ISO week date	2026-W21-5
Japanese	6 Uzuki, Reiwa 8 (Shōman, 15 days until Bōshu)
Julian	9 May, AD 2026 (AM 7534)
Julian day	2461183
Korean	6 Baemdal, 4359 DE
Maya	13.0.13.11.0; 13 Zip, 3 Ahau
Roman	ante diem VII Idus Maias, MMDCCLXXIX AUC
Solar Hijri	1 Khordad, SH 1405
Tibetan	6 sa ga, me pho rta 2153 or 1772 or 1000

<<	May					>>
Su	Mo	Tu	We	Th	Fr	Sa
					1	2
3	4	5	6	7	8	9
10	11	12	13	14	15	16
17	18	19	20	21	22	23
24	25	26	27	28	29	30
31
2026

May 22 in recent years
2026 (Friday)
2025 (Thursday)
2024 (Wednesday)
2023 (Monday)
2022 (Sunday)
2021 (Saturday)
2020 (Friday)
2019 (Wednesday)
2018 (Tuesday)
2017 (Monday)

May 22 is the 142nd day of the year (143rd in leap years) in the Gregorian calendar; 223 days remain until the end of the year.

== Events ==
=== Pre-1600 ===
- 192 – Dong Zhuo is assassinated by his adopted son Lü Bu.
- 760 – Fourteenth recorded perihelion passage of Halley's Comet.
- 853 – A Byzantine fleet sacks and destroys undefended Damietta in Egypt.
- 1176 – The Hashshashin (Assassins) attempt to assassinate Saladin near Aleppo.
- 1200 – King John of England and King Philip II of France sign the Treaty of Le Goulet.
- 1246 – Henry Raspe is elected anti-king of the Kingdom of Germany in opposition to Conrad IV.
- 1254 – Serbian King Stefan Uroš I and the Republic of Venice sign a peace treaty.
- 1370 – Brussels massacre: An estimated 13 Jews are murdered and the rest of the Jewish community is banished from Brussels, Belgium, in an anti-Semitic attack, for allegedly desecrating consecrated Host.
- 1377 – Pope Gregory XI issues five papal bulls to denounce the doctrines of English theologian John Wycliffe.
- 1455 – Start of the Wars of the Roses: At the First Battle of St Albans, Richard, Duke of York, defeats and captures King Henry VI of England.
- 1520 – The massacre at the festival of Tóxcatl takes place during the Fall of Tenochtitlan, resulting in turning the Aztecs against the Spanish.

=== 1601–1900 ===
- 1629 – Holy Roman Emperor Ferdinand II and Danish King Christian IV sign the Treaty of Lübeck ending Danish intervention in the Thirty Years' War.
- 1762 – Sweden and Prussia sign the Treaty of Hamburg.
- 1762 – Trevi Fountain is officially completed and inaugurated in Rome.
- 1766 – A large earthquake causes heavy damage and loss of life in Istanbul and the Marmara region.
- 1804 – The Lewis and Clark Expedition officially begins as the Corps of Discovery departs from St. Charles, Missouri.
- 1807 – A grand jury indicts former Vice President of the United States Aaron Burr on a charge of treason.
- 1809 – On the second and last day of the Battle of Aspern-Essling (near Vienna, Austria), Napoleon I is defeated in a major battle for the first time in his career, and repelled by an enemy army for the first time in a decade.
- 1816 – A mob in Littleport, Cambridgeshire, England, riots over high unemployment and rising grain costs, and the riots spread to Ely the next day.
- 1819 – SS Savannah leaves port at Savannah, Georgia, United States, on a voyage to become the first steamship to cross the Atlantic Ocean.
- 1826 – HMS Beagle departs on its first voyage.
- 1840 – The penal transportation of British convicts to the New South Wales colony is abolished.
- 1846 – The Associated Press is formed in New York City as a non-profit news cooperative.
- 1848 – Slavery is abolished in Martinique.
- 1849 – Future U.S. President Abraham Lincoln is issued a patent for an invention to lift boats, making him the only U.S. president to ever hold a patent.
- 1856 – Congressman Preston Brooks of South Carolina severely beats Senator Charles Sumner of Massachusetts with a cane in the hall of the United States Senate for a speech Sumner had made regarding Southerners and slavery.
- 1863 – American Civil War: Union forces begin the Siege of Port Hudson which lasts 48 days, the longest siege in U.S. military history.
- 1864 – American Civil War: After ten weeks, the Union Army's Red River Campaign ends in failure.
- 1866 – Oliver Winchester founds the Winchester Repeating Arms.
- 1872 – Reconstruction Era: President Ulysses S. Grant signs the Amnesty Act into law, restoring full civil and political rights to all but about 500 Confederate sympathizers.
- 1874 – Verdi's Requiem is first performed at San Marco in Milan on the first anniversary of Alessandro Manzoni's death.

=== 1901–present ===
- 1905 – The Sultan of the Ottoman Empire Abdul Hamid II establishes the Ullah millet for the Aromanians of the empire. For this reason, the Aromanian National Day is sometimes celebrated on this day, although most do so on May 23 instead, which is when this event was publicly announced.
- 1906 – The Wright brothers are granted U.S. patent number 821,393 for their "Flying-Machine".
- 1911 – The Uruguayan Regional Workers' Federation declares a general strike in solidarity with trolley workers in Montevideo.
- 1915 – Lassen Peak erupts with a powerful force, the only volcano besides Mount St. Helens to erupt in the contiguous U.S. during the 20th century.
- 1915 – Three trains collide in the Quintinshill rail disaster near Gretna Green, Scotland, killing 227 people and injuring 246.
- 1916 – A British army defeats a force of the Darfur Sultanate under Sultan Ali Dinar due to its superior firepower in the battle of Beringia.
- 1926 – Chiang Kai-shek replaces the communists in Kuomintang China.
- 1927 – Near Xining, China, an 8.3 magnitude earthquake causes 200,000 deaths in one of the world's most destructive earthquakes.
- 1939 – World War II: Germany and Italy sign the Pact of Steel.
- 1941 – During the Anglo-Iraqi War, British troops take Fallujah.
- 1942 – Mexico enters the Second World War on the side of the Allies.
- 1943 – Joseph Stalin disbands the Comintern.
- 1947 – Cold War: The Truman Doctrine goes into effect, aiding Turkey and Greece.
- 1948 – Finnish President J. K. Paasikivi releases Yrjö Leino from his duties as interior minister after the Finnish parliament adopted a motion of censure of Leino with connection to his illegal handing over of nineteen people to the Soviet Union in 1945.
- 1957 – South Africa's government approves of racial separation in universities.
- 1958 – The 1958 riots in Ceylon become a watershed in the race relations of various ethnic communities of Sri Lanka. The total deaths are estimated at 300, mostly Tamils.
- 1960 – The Great Chilean earthquake, measuring 9.5 on the moment magnitude scale, hits southern Chile, becoming the most powerful earthquake ever recorded.
- 1962 – Continental Airlines Flight 11 crashes in Unionville, Missouri after bombs explode on board, killing 45.
- 1963 – Greek left-wing politician Grigoris Lambrakis is clubbed over the head, causing his death five days later.
- 1964 – U.S. President Lyndon B. Johnson launches his Great Society program.
- 1967 – Egypt closes the Straits of Tiran to Israeli shipping.
- 1967 – L'Innovation department store in Brussels, Belgium, burns down, resulting in 323 dead or missing and 150 injured, the most devastating fire in Belgian history.
- 1968 – The nuclear-powered submarine USS Scorpion sinks with 99 men aboard, 400 nautical miles (740 km) southwest of the Azores.
- 1969 – Apollo 10's Lunar Module flies within 8.4 nautical miles (16 km) of the Moon's surface.
- 1972 – Ceylon adopts a new constitution, becoming a republic and changing its name to Sri Lanka.
- 1972 – Over 400 women in Derry, Northern Ireland attack the offices of Sinn Féin following the shooting by the Irish Republican Army of a young British soldier on leave.
- 1987 – Hashimpura massacre occurs in Meerut, India.
- 1987 – First ever Rugby World Cup kicks off with New Zealand playing Italy at Eden Park in Auckland, New Zealand.
- 1990 – North and South Yemen are unified to create the Republic of Yemen.
- 1992 – Bosnia and Herzegovina, Croatia and Slovenia join the United Nations.
- 1994 – A worldwide trade embargo against Haiti goes into effect to punish its military rulers for not reinstating the country's ousted elected leader, Jean-Bertrand Aristide.
- 1996 – The Burmese military regime jails 71 supporters of Aung San Suu Kyi in a bid to block a pro-democracy meeting.
- 1998 – A U.S. federal judge rules that U.S. Secret Service agents can be compelled to testify before a grand jury concerning the Lewinsky scandal involving President Bill Clinton.
- 2000 – In Sri Lanka, over 150 Tamil rebels are killed over two days of fighting for control in Jaffna.
- 2002 – Civil rights movement: A jury in Birmingham, Alabama, convicts former Ku Klux Klan member Bobby Frank Cherry of the 1963 murder of four girls in the 16th Street Baptist Church bombing.
- 2009 – Metalworkers at a Ssangyong Motor plant in Pyeongtaek, South Korea, begin a strike to protest job cuts.
- 2010 – Air India Express Flight 812, a Boeing 737 crashes over a cliff upon landing at Mangalore, India, killing 158 of 166 people on board, becoming the deadliest crash involving a Boeing 737 until the crash of Lion Air Flight 610.
- 2010 – Inter Milan beat Bayern Munich 2–0 in the UEFA Champions League final in Madrid, Spain to become the first, and so far only, Italian team to win the historic treble (Serie A, Coppa Italia, Champions League).
- 2011 – An EF5 tornado strikes Joplin, Missouri, killing 158 people and wreaking $2.8 billion in damages, the costliest and seventh-deadliest single tornado in U.S. history.
- 2012 – Tokyo Skytree opens to the public. It is the tallest tower in the world (634 m), and the third tallest man-made structure on Earth after Merdeka 118 (680.5 m) and Burj Khalifa (829.8 m).
- 2012 – SpaceX COTS Demo Flight 2 launches a Dragon capsule on a Falcon 9 rocket in the first commercial flight to the International Space Station.
- 2013 – Fusilier Lee Rigby is murdered by two Islamic extremists in Woolwich, Southeast London.
- 2014 – General Prayut Chan-o-cha becomes interim leader of Thailand in a military coup d'état, following six months of political turmoil.
- 2014 – An explosion occurs in Ürümqi, capital of China's far-western Xinjiang region, resulting in at least 43 deaths and 91 injuries.
- 2015 – The Republic of Ireland becomes the first nation in the world to utilise a public referendum to legalise gay marriage.
- 2017 – Twenty-two people are killed at an Ariana Grande concert in the 2017 Manchester Arena bombing.
- 2017 – United States President Donald Trump visits the Church of the Holy Sepulchre in Jerusalem and becomes the first sitting U.S. president to visit the Western Wall.
- 2020 – Pakistan International Airlines Flight 8303 crashes in Model Colony near Jinnah International Airport in Karachi, Pakistan, killing 98 people.
- 2021 – Hypothermia kills 21 runners in the 100 km (60-mile) Gansu ultramarathon disaster in China.
- 2026 – A gas explosion at a coal mine in Changzhi, Shanxi, leaves at least 82 people dead.

== Births ==
=== Pre-1600 ===
- 626 – Itzam K'an Ahk I, Mayan king (died 686)
- 1009 – Su Xun, Chinese writer (died 1066)
- 1408 – Annamacharya, Hindu saint (died 1503)
- 1539 – Edward Seymour, 1st Earl of Hertford (died 1621)

=== 1601–1900 ===
- 1622 – Louis de Buade de Frontenac, French soldier and governor (died 1698)
- 1644 – Gabriël Grupello, Flemish Baroque sculptor (died 1730)
- 1650 – Richard Brakenburgh, Dutch Golden Age painter (died 1702)
- 1665 – Magnus Stenbock, Swedish field marshal and Royal Councillor (died 1717)
- 1694 – Daniel Gran, Austrian painter (died 1757)
- 1715 – François-Joachim de Pierre de Bernis, French cardinal and diplomat (died 1794)
- 1733 – Hubert Robert, French painter (died 1808)
- 1752 – Louis Legendre, French butcher and politician (died 1797)
- 1762 – Henry Bathurst, 3rd Earl Bathurst, English politician (died 1834)
- 1770 – Princess Elizabeth of the United Kingdom (died 1840)
- 1772 – Ram Mohan Roy, Indian philosopher and reformer (died 1833)
- 1779 – Johann Nepomuk Schödlberger, Austrian painter (died 1853)
- 1782 – Hirose Tansō, Japanese neo-Confucian scholar, teacher, writer (died 1856)
- 1783 – William Sturgeon, English physicist and inventor, invented the electromagnet and electric motor (died 1850)
- 1808 – Gérard de Nerval, French poet and translator (died 1855)
- 1811 – Giulia Grisi, Italian soprano (died 1869)
- 1811 – Henry Pelham-Clinton, 5th Duke of Newcastle, English politician (died 1864)
- 1813 – Richard Wagner, German composer (died 1883)
- 1814 – Amalia Lindegren, Swedish painter (died 1891)
- 1820 – Worthington Whittredge, American painter (died 1910)
- 1828 – Albrecht von Graefe, German ophthalmologist and academic (died 1870)
- 1831 – Henry Vandyke Carter, English anatomist and surgeon (died 1897)
- 1833 – Félix Bracquemond, French painter and etcher (died 1914)
- 1833 – Manuel Ruiz Zorrilla, Spanish politician, Prime Minister of Spain (died 1895)
- 1841 – Catulle Mendès, French poet, author, and playwright (died 1909)
- 1844 – Mary Cassatt, American painter and educator (died 1926)
- 1846 – Rita Cetina Gutiérrez, Mexican poet, educator, and activist (died 1908)
- 1848 – Fritz von Uhde, German painter and educator (died 1911)
- 1849 – Aston Webb, English architect and academic (died 1930)
- 1858 – Belmiro de Almeida, Brazilian painter, illustrator, sculptor (died 1935)
- 1859 – Arthur Conan Doyle, British writer (died 1930)
- 1859 – Tsubouchi Shōyō, Japanese author, playwright, and educator (died 1935)
- 1864 – Willy Stöwer, German author and illustrator (died 1931)
- 1868 – Augusto Pestana, Brazilian engineer and politician (died 1934)
- 1874 – Daniel François Malan, South African clergyman and politician, 5th Prime Minister of South Africa (died 1959)
- 1876 – Julius Klinger, Austrian painter and illustrator (died 1942)
- 1879 – Warwick Armstrong, Australian cricketer and journalist (died 1947)
- 1879 – Jean Cras, French admiral and composer (died 1932)
- 1879 – Symon Petliura, Ukrainian statesman and independence leader (died 1926)
- 1880 – Francis de Miomandre, French author and translator (died 1959)
- 1884 – Wilhelmina Hay Abbott, Scottish suffragist and feminist (died 1957)
- 1885 – Giacomo Matteotti, Italian lawyer and politician (died 1924)
- 1885 – Soemu Toyoda, Japanese admiral (died 1957)
- 1887 – A. W. Sandberg, Danish film director and screenwriter (died 1938)
- 1891 – Johannes R. Becher, German politician, novelist, and poet (died 1958)
- 1894 – Friedrich Pollock, German sociologist and philosopher (died 1970)
- 1897 – Robert Neumann, German and English-speaking author (died 1975)
- 1900 – Juan Arvizu, Mexican lyric opera tenor and bolero vocalist (died 1985)

=== 1901–present ===
- 1901 – Maurice J. Tobin, American politician, 6th United States Secretary of Labor (died 1953)
- 1902 – Jack Lambert, English footballer and manager (died 1940)
- 1902 – Al Simmons, American baseball player and coach (died 1956)
- 1904 – Uno Lamm, Swedish electrical engineer and inventor (died 1989)
- 1905 – Bodo von Borries, German physicist and academic, co-invented the electron microscope (died 1956)
- 1905 – Tom Driberg, British politician (died 1976)
- 1907 – Hergé, Belgian author and illustrator (died 1983)
- 1907 – Laurence Olivier, English actor, director, and producer (died 1989)
- 1908 – Horton Smith, American golfer and captain (died 1963)
- 1909 – Bob Dyer, American-Australian radio and television host (died 1984)
- 1909 – Margaret Mee, English illustrator and educator (died 1988)
- 1912 – Herbert C. Brown, English-American chemist and academic, Nobel Prize laureate (died 2004)
- 1913 – Rafael Gil, Spanish director and screenwriter (died 1986)
- 1913 – Dominique Rolin, Belgian author (died 2012)
- 1914 – Max Kohnstamm, Dutch historian and diplomat (died 2010)
- 1914 – Sun Ra, American pianist, composer, bandleader, poet (died 1993)
- 1917 – George Aratani, American businessman and philanthropist (died 2013)
- 1917 – Jean-Louis Curtis, French author (died 1995)
- 1919 – Paul Vanden Boeynants, Belgian businessman and politician, 55th Prime Minister of Belgium (died 2001)
- 1920 – Thomas Gold, Austrian-American astrophysicist and academic (died 2004)
- 1921 – George S. Hammond, American scientist (died 2005)
- 1922 – Quinn Martin, American screenwriter and producer (died 1987)
- 1924 – Charles Aznavour, French-Armenian singer-songwriter and actor (died 2018)
- 1925 – Jean Tinguely, Swiss painter and sculptor (died 1991)
- 1927 – Michael Constantine, American actor (died 2021)
- 1927 – Peter Matthiessen, American novelist, short story writer, editor, co-founded The Paris Review (died 2014)
- 1927 – George Andrew Olah, Hungarian-American chemist and academic, Nobel Prize laureate (died 2017)
- 1928 – Raymond E. Brown, American Sulpician priest and biblical scholar (died 1998)
- 1928 – Serge Doubrovsky, French theorist and author (died 2017)
- 1928 – John Mackenzie, Scottish director and producer (died 2011)
- 1928 – T. Boone Pickens, American businessman (died 2019)
- 1928 – Hiroshi Sano, Japanese novelist (died 2013)
- 1929 – Ahmed Fouad Negm, Egyptian poet (died 2013)
- 1930 – Kenny Ball, English jazz trumpet player, vocalist, and bandleader (died 2013)
- 1930 – Marisol Escobar, French-American sculptor (died 2016)
- 1930 – Harvey Milk, American lieutenant and politician (died 1978)
- 1932 – Robert Spitzer, American psychiatrist and academic (died 2015)
- 1933 – Fred Anderson, Australian-South African rugby league player (died 2012)
- 1933 – Chen Jingrun, Chinese mathematician and academic (died 1996)
- 1934 – Peter Nero, American pianist and conductor (died 2023)
- 1934 – Garry Wills, American historian, author, and political philosopher
- 1935 – Billy Rayner, Australian rugby league player (died 2006)
- 1936 – George H. Heilmeier, American engineer (died 2014)
- 1937 – Facundo Cabral, Argentinian singer-songwriter (died 2011)
- 1937 – Tomáš Janovic, Slovak writer (died 2023)
- 1938 – Richard Benjamin, American actor and director
- 1938 – Susan Strasberg, American actress (died 1999)
- 1939 – Paul Winfield, American actor (died 2004)
- 1940 – Kieth Merrill, American filmmaker
- 1940 – E. A. S. Prasanna, Indian cricketer
- 1940 – Michael Sarrazin, Canadian actor (died 2011)
- 1940 – Bernard Shaw, American journalist (died 2022)
- 1940 – Mick Tingelhoff, American football player (died 2021)
- 1941 – Menzies Campbell, Scottish sprinter and politician (died 2025)
- 1942 – Roger Brown, American basketball player (died 1997)
- 1942 – Ted Kaczynski, American academic and mathematician turned anarchist and serial murderer (Unabomber) (died 2023)
- 1942 – Barbara Parkins, Canadian actress
- 1942 – Richard Oakes, Native American civil rights activist (died 1972)
- 1943 – Betty Williams, Northern Irish peace activist, Nobel Prize laureate (died 2020)
- 1943 – Tommy John, American baseball player (died 2026)
- 1944 – John Flanagan, Australian fantasy author (died 2026)
- 1945 – Bob Katter, Australian politician
- 1946 – George Best, Northern Irish footballer (died 2005)
- 1946 – Michael Green, English physicist and academic
- 1946 – Howard Kendall, English footballer and manager (died 2015)
- 1946 – Andrei Marga, Romanian philosopher, political scientist, politician
- 1946 – Lyudmila Zhuravleva, Russian-Ukrainian astronomer
- 1948 – Tomás Sánchez, Cuban painter and engraver
- 1948 – Nedumudi Venu, Indian actor and screenwriter (died 2021)
- 1949 – Cheryl Campbell, English actress
- 1949 – Valentin Inzko, Austrian diplomat
- 1950 – Bernie Taupin, English singer-songwriter and poet
- 1951 – Kenneth Bianchi, American serial killer and rapist
- 1953 – François Bon, French writer
- 1953 – Cha Bum-kun, South Korean footballer and manager
- 1953 – Paul Mariner, English footballer, coach, and manager (died 2021)
- 1954 – Barbara May Cameron, Native American human rights activist (died 2002)
- 1954 – Shuji Nakamura, Japanese-American physicist and engineer, Nobel Prize laureate
- 1955 – Iva Davies, Australian singer-songwriter and guitarist
- 1956 – Lucie Brock-Broido, American poet (died 2018)
- 1957 – Lisa Murkowski, American lawyer and politician
- 1959 – David Blatt, Israeli-American basketball player and coach
- 1959 – Olin Browne, American golfer
- 1959 – Morrissey, English singer-songwriter and performer
- 1959 – Kwak Jae-yong, South Korean director and screenwriter
- 1959 – Mehbooba Mufti, Indian politician
- 1960 – Hideaki Anno, Japanese animator, director, and screenwriter
- 1962 – Andrew Magee, French-American golfer
- 1962 – Brian Pillman, American football player and wrestler (died 1997)
- 1963 – Claude Closky, French contemporary artist
- 1965 – Jay Carney, American journalist, 29th White House Press Secretary
- 1966 – Johnny Gill, American singer-songwriter and producer
- 1966 – Wang Xiaoshuai, Chinese director and screenwriter
- 1968 – Graham Linehan, Irish comedy writer and activist
- 1969 – Michael Kelly, American actor
- 1969 – Cathy McMorris Rodgers, American lawyer and politician
- 1970 – Naomi Campbell, English model
- 1970 – Brody Stevens, American comedian and actor (died 2019)
- 1972 – Max Brooks, American author and screenwriter
- 1973 – Nikolaj Lie Kaas, Danish actor
- 1973 – Shefali Shah, Indian actress
- 1974 – Sean Gunn, American actor
- 1974 – Garba Lawal, Nigerian footballer
- 1974 – Henrietta Ónodi, Hungarian Olympic gymnast
- 1974 – Arseniy Yatsenyuk, Ukrainian politician
- 1974 – Canek Sánchez Guevara, Cuban author and dissident (died 2015)
- 1974 – Anne Beathe Tvinnereim, Norwegian politician
- 1975 – Salva Ballesta, Spanish footballer and manager
- 1976 – Christian Vande Velde, American cyclist
- 1977 – Pat Smullen, Irish jockey (died 2020)
- 1978 – Ginnifer Goodwin, American actress
- 1978 – Katie Price, English television personality and glamour model
- 1979 – Nazanin Boniadi, Iranian-American actress
- 1979 – Tihomir Dovramadjiev, Bulgarian Chess boxer
- 1979 – Maggie Q, American actress
- 1980 – Tarin Bradford, Australian rugby league player
- 1980 – Sharice Davids, American politician
- 1980 – Lucy Gordon, British actress and model (died 2009)
- 1981 – Bryan Danielson, American wrestler
- 1981 – Bassel Khartabil, Syrian computer programmer and engineer (died 2015)
- 1981 – Jürgen Melzer, Austrian tennis player
- 1981 – Mark O'Meley, Australian rugby league player
- 1982 – Erin McNaught, Australian model and actress
- 1982 – Apolo Ohno, American speed skater
- 1982 – Hong Yong-jo, North Korean footballer
- 1983 – Natasha Kai, American soccer player and Olympic medalist
- 1984 – Clara Amfo, English television and radio presenter
- 1984 – Karoline Herfurth, German actress
- 1984 – Didier Ya Konan, Ivorian footballer
- 1984 – Dustin Moskovitz, American entrepreneur, co-founder of Facebook
- 1985 – Tranquillo Barnetta, Swiss footballer
- 1985 – Mauro Boselli, Argentine footballer
- 1985 – Tao Okamoto, Japanese model and actress
- 1986 – Julian Edelman, American football player
- 1986 – Matt Jarvis, English footballer
- 1986 – Tatiana Volosozhar, Russian figure skater
- 1987 – Novak Djokovic, Serbian tennis player
- 1987 – Arturo Vidal, Chilean footballer
- 1988 – Heida Reed, Icelandic-British actress
- 1989 – Corey Dickerson, American baseball player
- 1990 – Wyatt Roy, Australian politician
- 1991 – Joel Obi, Nigerian footballer
- 1991 – Suho, South Korean singer and actor
- 1992 – Anna Baryshnikov, American actress
- 1994 – Florian Luger, Austrian male model
- 1994 – Athena Manoukian, Greek-Armenian singer and songwriter
- 1997 – Lauri Markkanen, Finnish basketball player
- 1997 – Brandon Duhaime, American ice hockey player
- 1998 – Samile Bermannelli, Brazilian fashion model
- 1999 – Samuel Chukwueze, Nigerian footballer
- 1999 – Femke Huijzer, Dutch model
- 1999 – Hōshōryū Tomokatsu, Mongolian sumo wrestler
- 2000 – Julián Carranza, Argentine footballer
- 2001 – Enzo Barrenechea, Argentine footballer
- 2001 – Emma Chamberlain, American internet personality
- 2001 – Joshua Zirkzee, Dutch footballer
- 2002 – Anthony Richardson, American football player
- 2004 – Peyton Elizabeth Lee, American actress

== Deaths ==
=== Pre-1600 ===
- 192 – Dong Zhuo, Chinese warlord and politician (born 138)
- 337 – Constantine the Great, Roman emperor (born 272)
- 748 – Empress Genshō of Japan (born 683)
- 1068 – Emperor Go-Reizei of Japan (born 1025)
- 1310 – Saint Humility, founder of the Vallumbrosan religious order of nuns (born c.1226)
- 1409 – Blanche of England, sister of King Henry V (born 1392)
- 1455 – Edmund Beaufort, 2nd Duke of Somerset, English commander (born 1406)
- 1455 – Thomas Clifford, 8th Baron de Clifford, Lancastrian commander (born 1414)
- 1455 – Henry Percy, 2nd Earl of Northumberland, English commander (born 1393)
- 1457 – Rita of Cascia, Italian nun and saint (born 1381)
- 1490 – Edmund Grey, 1st Earl of Kent, English administrator, nobleman and magnate (born 1416)
- 1538 – John Forest, English friar and martyr (born 1471)
- 1540 – Francesco Guicciardini, Italian historian and politician (born 1483)
- 1545 – Sher Shah Suri, Indian ruler (born 1486)
- 1553 – Giovanni Bernardi, Italian sculptor and engraver (born 1495)

=== 1601–1900 ===
- 1602 – Renata of Lorraine (born 1544)
- 1609 – Pieter Willemsz. Verhoeff, Dutch captain (born 1573)
- 1666 – Gaspar Schott, German physicist and mathematician (born 1608)
- 1667 – Pope Alexander VII (born 1599)
- 1745 – François-Marie, 1st duc de Broglie, French general (born 1671)
- 1760 – Baal Shem Tov, Polish rabbi and author (born 1700)
- 1772 – Durastante Natalucci, Italian historian and academic (born 1687)
- 1795 – Ewald Friedrich von Hertzberg, Prussian politician, Foreign Minister of Prussia (born 1725)
- 1802 – Martha Washington, First, First Lady of the United States (born 1731)
- 1851 – Mordecai Manuel Noah, American journalist and diplomat (born 1755)
- 1859 – Ferdinand II of the Two Sicilies (born 1810)
- 1861 – Thornsbury Bailey Brown, American soldier (born 1829)
- 1868 – Julius Plücker, German mathematician and physicist (born 1801)
- 1885 – Victor Hugo, French novelist, poet, and playwright (born 1802)

=== 1901–present ===
- 1901 – Gaetano Bresci, Italian-American anarchist, assassin of Umberto I of Italy (born 1869)
- 1910 – Jules Renard, French author and playwright (born 1864)
- 1932 – Augusta, Lady Gregory, Anglo-Irish activist, landlord, and playwright, co-founded the Abbey Theatre (born 1852)
- 1933 – Tsengeltiin Jigjidjav, Mongolian politician, 10th Prime Minister of Mongolia (born 1894)
- 1938 – William Glackens, American painter and illustrator (born 1870)
- 1939 – Ernst Toller, German playwright and author (born 1893)
- 1939 – Jiří Mahen, Czech author and playwright (born 1882)
- 1948 – Claude McKay, Jamaican writer and poet (born 1889)
- 1950 – Alfonso Quiñónez Molina, Salvadoran politician, physician, and three-time president of El Salvador (born 1874)
- 1954 – Chief Bender, American baseball player, coach, and manager (born 1884)
- 1965 – Christopher Stone, English radio host (born 1882)
- 1966 – Tom Goddard, English cricketer (born 1900)
- 1967 – Langston Hughes, American poet, social activist, novelist, and playwright (born 1902)
- 1967 – Charlotte Serber, American Librarian of the Manhattan Project's Los Alamos site (born 1911)
- 1972 – Cecil Day-Lewis, Anglo-Irish poet and author (born 1904)
- 1972 – Margaret Rutherford, English actress (born 1892)
- 1974 – Irmgard Flügge-Lotz, German-American mathematician and aerospace engineer (born 1903)
- 1975 – Lefty Grove, American baseball player (born 1900)
- 1982 – Cevdet Sunay, Turkish general and politician, 5th President of Turkey (born 1899)
- 1983 – Albert Claude, Belgian biologist and academic, Nobel Prize laureate (born 1899)
- 1983 – Erna Scheffler, German lawyer and justice of the Federal Constitutional Court (born 1893)
- 1984 – Karl-August Fagerholm, Finnish politician, valtioneuvos, the Speaker of the Parliament and the Prime Minister of Finland (born 1901)
- 1985 – Wolfgang Reitherman, German-American animator, director, and producer (born 1909)
- 1988 – Giorgio Almirante, Italian journalist and politician (born 1914)
- 1989 – Steven De Groote, South African pianist and educator (born 1953)
- 1990 – Rocky Graziano, American boxer (born 1922)
- 1991 – Lino Brocka, Filipino director and screenwriter (born 1939)
- 1991 – Shripad Amrit Dange, Indian lawyer and politician (born 1899)
- 1991 – Stan Mortensen, English footballer and manager (born 1921)
- 1992 – Zellig Harris, American linguist and academic (born 1909)
- 1993 – Mieczysław Horszowski, Polish-American pianist and composer (born 1892)
- 1997 – Alziro Bergonzo, Italian architect and painter (born 1906)
- 1997 – Alfred Hershey, American biochemist and geneticist, Nobel Prize laureate (born 1908)
- 1998 – John Derek, American actor, director, and photographer (born 1926)
- 1998 – José Enrique Moyal, Israeli physicist and engineer (born 1910)
- 2000 – Davie Fulton, Canadian lawyer, judge, and politician (born 1916)
- 2004 – Richard Biggs, American actor (born 1960)
- 2004 – Mikhail Voronin, Russian gymnast (born 1945)
- 2005 – Charilaos Florakis, Greek politician (born 1914)
- 2005 – Thurl Ravenscroft, American voice actor and singer (born 1914)
- 2006 – Lee Jong-wook, South Korean physician and diplomat (born 1945)
- 2007 – Pemba Doma Sherpa, Nepalese mountaineer (born 1970)
- 2008 – Robert Asprin, American soldier and author (born 1946)
- 2010 – Martin Gardner, American mathematician, cryptographer, and author (born 1914)
- 2011 – Joseph Brooks, American director, producer, screenwriter, and composer (born 1938)
- 2012 – Muzafar Bhutto, Pakistani politician (born 1970)
- 2012 – Wesley A. Brown, American lieutenant and engineer (born 1927)
- 2013 – Sigurd Ottovich Schmidt, Russian historian and ethnographer (born 1922)
- 2015 – Marques Haynes, American basketball player and coach (born 1926)
- 2015 – Vladimir Katriuk, Ukrainian-Canadian SS officer (born 1921)
- 2016 – Velimir "Bata" Živojinović, Serbian actor and politician (born 1933)
- 2017 – Nicky Hayden, American motorcycle racer (born 1981)
- 2019 – Judith Kerr, German-born British writer and illustrator (born 1923)
- 2020 – Denise Cronenberg, Canadian costume designer (born 1938)
- 2022 – Dervla Murphy, Irish touring cyclist and author (born 1931)
- 2024 – David Wilkie, Scottish swimmer (born 1954)
- 2026 – Richard A. Tapia, American mathematician, National Medal of Science recipient (born 1939)

== Holidays and observances ==
- Abolition Day (Martinique)
- Aromanian National Day (marginal, celebration on May 23 is more common)
- Christian feast day:
  - Castus and Emilius
  - Fulk
  - Humilita
  - Blessed John Forest
  - Blessed Maria Domenica Brun Barbantini
  - Michael Hồ Đình Hy (one of Vietnamese Martyrs)
  - Quiteria
  - Rita of Cascia
  - Romanus of Subiaco
  - May 22 (Eastern Orthodox liturgics)
- Harvey Milk Day (California)
- International Day for Biological Diversity (International)
- United States National Maritime Day
- National Sovereignty Day (Haiti)
- Republic Day (Sri Lanka)
- Translation of the Relics of Saint Nicholas from Myra to Bari (Ukraine)
- Unity Day (Yemen), celebrates the unification of North and South Yemen into the Republic of Yemen in 1990.
- World Goth Day
