= Heiko Müller =

German painter (born 1968)

Heiko Müller (born 13 January 1968) is a German painter.

== Overview ==
Heiko Müller works as an independent artist. His works have been exhibited in his hometown of Hamburg as well as in New York City, Los Angeles, Seattle, Chicago, Paris, Saint Petersburg and Tartu. He also curated several exhibitions in Hamburg. He has a design diploma from the Hamburg University of Applied Sciences and is also working as a professional media designer and illustrator. He is living with his wife and his two sons near Hamburg.

== Work ==
Heiko Müller's paintings take their inspiration from such diverse sources as medieval icons, Dutch and Flemish Renaissance painting, folk art and contemporary comics. He gained first attention by combining medieval Christian icons with modern digital art. His latest work is close to the American lowbrow and pop surrealism movement. Characteristics of his paintings are animal illustrations with a very dark and apocalyptic mood, often appearing like modern takes on Bosch or Bruegel motifs. In his own words, he's "particularly thrilled by the kind of spiritual terror you find expressed in the paintings of the old Flemish masters, [...] trying to find out what happens when you apply that mood to the serene and harmless world of rural folk art."
Müller's most recent work marks a return to painting after a long period of drawing with coloured pencils, during which he developed special techniques to make the drawings appear like oil paintings. His preferred media are acrylic and oil on paper and oil on canvas, complemented by pencil drawings. Müller's art is exhibited and bought almost as often in the US as in his native Europe.

== Exhibitions ==
Solo shows:

- 2001 “PXP-Guy presents: Black Lines”, Galerie Hinterconti, Hamburg, Germany
- 2004 "Legendae Aureae", Deutsches Kulturinstitut, Tartu, Estonia
- 2009 "Stay Awake", Jack Fischer Gallery, San Francisco, USA
- 2012 "Hunting Night and Day", Jack Fischer Gallery, San Francisco, USA
- 2012 "Furtivos", etHALL, Barcelona, Spain
- 2013 "The Daily Mood of Heiko Müller", Alexandra Grass Gallery, Bielefeld, Germany
- 2013 "The Watching Hour", Antonio Colombo Arte Contemporanea, Milan, Italy
- 2014 "Glades", Feinkunst Krüger, Hamburg, Germany

Group shows (selection):

- 1997 "Junge Hamburger", with Henning Kles and Till Gerhard, Studio Galerie, Hamburg
- 1997 "Experiment Bilderbuch", Stadtmuseum Oldenburg
- 1998 various exhibitions at the Büchergilde Gutenberg in Hamburg, Frankfurt and Berlin.
- 2001 "S.K.A.M.finale", S.K.A.M. Studio, Hamburg
- 2001 “Kopfankopf in AUGENHÖHE”, Kunststück, Hamburg
- 2003 “Tag der Toten”, with Henning Kles and Till Gerhard, Feinkunst Krüger, Hamburg
- 2005 "Territory #4" Exhibition & Release Party, OFR Publications, Paris
- 2005 "14 Illustratoren", Galeria Pequeña, Frankfurt am Main
- 2005 "Spezialitäten", Feinkunst Krüger, Hamburg
- 2006 "Visual Residue", CB's 313 Gallery, New York
- 2006 "Winged Doom vs. Reeperbahn Rumble", with Marcus Schäfer, Feinkunst Krüger, Hamburg
- 2006 "Haare", Galeria Pequeña, Frankfurt am Main
- 2006 "That New Dork Smell ", Toyroom, Sacramento
- 2006 "Beasts", Belle & Wissell, Seattle
- 2006 "Don't Wake Daddy", Feinkunst Krüger, Hamburg
- 2006 "NeighborWOOD", Compound Gallery, Portland
- 2007 "The Wurstminster Dog Show", Portland
- 2007 "Charity by Numbers", Los Angeles
- 2007 "Happily Ever After?", Seattle
- 2007 "Art Dorks Collective", Thinkspace Art Gallery, Los Angeles
- 2007 "Art Dorks Squared", The McCaig-Welles Gallery, New York
- 2007 "Rome is Burning/The New School", The Foster Gallery - Haas Fine Arts Center, Eau Claire (Wisconsin)
- 2007 "Don't Wake Daddy II", Feinkunst Krüger & RAUM 21, Hamburg
- 2007 December Charity Show, The Project Gallery, Los Angeles
- 2008 "Deep Pop", Kenneth Chapman Gallery, New Rochelle (New York)
- 2008 "Pop Subversion at Ad Hoc Art", New York
- 2008 "A Cabinet Of Natural Curiosities", Roq La Rue Gallery, Seattle
- 2008 "The World of Urban Contemporary Art", Intoxicated Demons, Berlin
- 2008 "Art Dorks Collective", DVA Gallery, Chicago
- 2008 "4 Faces of Foofaraw" with Femke Hiemstra, Fred Stonehouse and Anthony Pontius, Feinkunst Krüger, Hamburg
- 2008 "10 Jahre Feinkunst Krüger", Westwerk, Hamburg
- 2008 "The Inaugural Show", T & P Fine Art, Philadelphia
- 2008 "Don't Wake Daddy III", Feinkunst Krüger, Hamburg
- 2008 X-MAS 08, Galleri Christoffer Egelund, Copenhagen
- 2009 "Mixed Palette" at the Recoat Gallery, Glasgow
- 2009 "Superschool" (curated by Lola) at Copro Nason Gallery, Santa Monica, CA
- 2009 "OCHO número atómico" at ROJO Artspace Barcelona
- 2009 "Boarding Gat"e (curated by Alexandra Kollaros) at K-art, Athens
- 2009 "Kunst im Tresor", Munich
- 2009 "Urban Art" at Galleri Jan|Zen, Aalborg, Denmark
- 2011 "Shades of Ray" Color Ink Book's 3rd Anniversary show at WWA gallery Culver City, CA

== Publications ==
- 2002 Lodown #34 (Berlin)
- 2003 Elegy #12/03 (Paris)
- 2004 1x1 Pixel-Based Illustration & Design (Barcelona)
- 2004 Freewave (Booth Clibborn Editions, London)
- 2005 Freistil 2 - Best of European Commercial Illustration
- 2005 Defrag #7 (Italy)
- 2005 Territory #4 - The Mood of Gothic (BigBrosWorkshop, Malaysia)
- 2006 The Darkening Garden (Payseur & Schmidt, Seattle)
- 2006 Beasts! (Fantagraphics, Seattle)
- 2007 dpi Magazine (Taiwan)
- 2007 LOW Magazine (Germany)
- 2007 a5 Magazine (Israel)
- 2007 LetGo Magazine (Los Angeles)
- 2007 Paper Tiger Comix #4 (Paper Tiger, UK)
- 2007 Empty Magazine (Australia)
- 2007 Castle Magazine #11 (Germany)
- 2007 ISM Autumn Issue v. 04 i. 03 (Los Angeles)
- 2007 ARGH! (Valencia)
- 2007 Jitter Magazin (Berlin)
- 2007 Cimaise - Ceci est un magazine d'ars (Paris)
- 2007 Belio Magazine (Madrid)
- 2007 D/Zines (LANDA Designer, Münster)
- 2008 Stirato (Rome)
- 2008 Underground Culture from all Parts of the World (Shoeisha, Japan)
- 2008 NOVUM (Munich)
- 2008 Heiko Müller - Stay Awake (ROJO, Barcelona)
- 2008 Pep! (Hungary)
- 2008 Good vs Evil #1 (London)
- 2008 AURORA Artzine (Germany)
- 2008 Color-Ink-Book San Diego 2008 Comic-Con Edition, The Brothers Washburn (Oceanside, CA)
- 2008 Proteus Mag #5 (PDF Magazine)
- 2008 Spooky Calendar 2009 by Die Gestalten Verlag (Berlin)
- 2008 Pocketful (Istanbul)
- 2008 The Upset: Young Contemporary Art, Die Gestalten Verlag (Berlin)
- 2008 Color-Ink-Book #1 APE Edition, The Brothers Washburn (Oceanside, CA)
- 2008 Good vs. Evil #2 (London)
- 2009 VIZIOmag #3 (E-Zine)
- 2009 a5 Magazine - Childhood Ausgabe (Israel)
- 2009 La Cruda #2 (Barcelona)
- 2009 Juxtapoz #98 (San Francisco)
- 2009 6M1P #11 (Toulouse)
- 2009 BG Magazine #41 Animal Edition (Ecuador)
- 2009 ROJO, Project OCHO, Número Atómico (Barcelona)
- 2009 Boarding Gate Catalogue, (Athens)
- 2009 Jitter Magazin (Berlin)
- 2009 Semi Permanent 2009 (Sydney)
- 2009 DODOS (Seoul)
- 2009 La Cruda #3 (Barcelona)
- 2009 W Korea - Green Edition (Korea)
- 2009 100% O2 Magazine #1 (Beijing)
- 2009 Good vs. Evil #3 (London)
- 2009 a5 Magazine - Hero Edition (Israel)
- 2009 The Upbeats - Ghost Radio/1968 12" Covergestaltung (New Zealand)
- 2009 The Ark (Argentina)
- 2009 EPOS VISA Card (Japan)
- 2009 A (dos puntos) (Santiago)
