= Maaike =

Dutch feminine given name

- Pronunciation: Dutch: [ˈmaːikə]
- Gender: Feminine
- Language: Dutch

Origin
- Language: Dutch
- Derivation: Maria + ke
- Meaning: Little Maria

Other names
- Variant forms: Maaijke, Maayke, Maeike, Maeyke
- Derived: Maria

Maaike (Dutch pronunciation: [ˈmaːikə]) is a Dutch feminine given name. The name is originally a diminutive of Maria, which is derived from the Hebrew name Miriam. In the Netherlands and Belgium are over 24,000 women with the name Maaike.

== Etymology ==
Maaike means 'little Maria'. The name is a diminutive as indicated by the suffix -ke of the given name Maria from Latin translation of the New Testament, which is based on the Greek original Mariam (Μαριάμ) and derived from the Hebrew given name Miriam (מִרְיָם). The meaning of Maria, Mariam, and Miriam is unknown. Less common spelling variants of Maaike are Maaijke, Maayke, Maeike, and Maeyke.

== Popularity ==
In 2017, there were 18.891 women with Maaike as first name and 4.671 women with Maaike as middle name in the Netherlands. In 2022, there were 657 women with Maaike as first name in Belgium, the majority of whom lived in the Dutch-speaking Flemish Region.

== People with the name ==
=== Maaike ===
People with the first name spelled Maaike include:

- Maaike Aarts (born 1976), Dutch violinist
- Maaike Boogaard (born 1998), Dutch cyclist
- Maaike Braat-Rolvink (1907–1992), Dutch painter
- Maaike Caelers (born 1990), Dutch triathlete
- Maaike De Vreese (born 1984), Belgian politician
- Maaike Hartjes (born 1972), Dutch cartoonist
- Maaike Head (born 1983), Dutch rower
- Maaike Keetman (born 1999), Dutch chess player
- Maaike van Klink (born 2000), Dutch footballer
- Maaike Koutstaal (born 1975), Dutch tennis player
- Maaike Kito Lebbing, Australian musician and producer, known professionally as Kito
- Maaike Meijer (born 1949), Dutch literary scholar
- Maaike Polspoel (born 1989), Belgian cyclist
- Maaike Schoorel (born 1973), Dutch artist
- Maaike Schroeder (born 1971), Dutch cricketer
- Maaike Smit (born 1966), Dutch wheelchair athlete
- Maaike Vos (born 1985), Dutch speed skater
- Maaike de Waard (born 1996), Dutch swimmer

=== Maayke ===
People with the first name spelled Maayke include:

- Maayke Heuver (born 1990), Dutch footballer
- Maayke Tjin-A-Lim (born 1998), Dutch hurdler
