= 32nd Chess Olympiad =

1996 chess tournament in Yerevan, Armenia

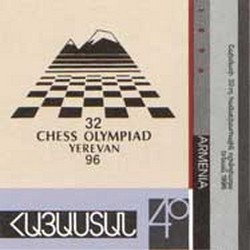
Armenian stamp featuring the logo of the 32nd Chess Olympiad

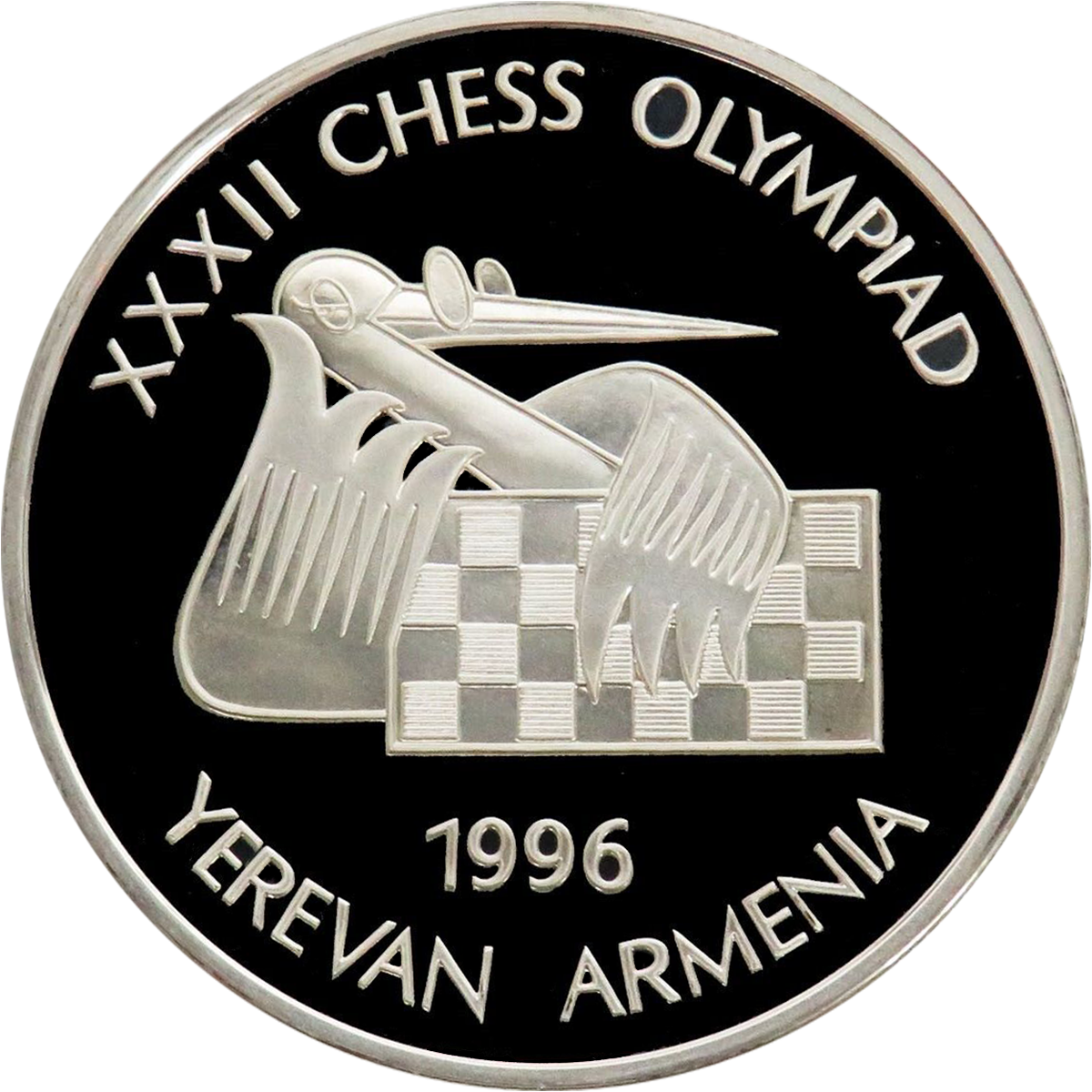
Commemorative coin of Armenia

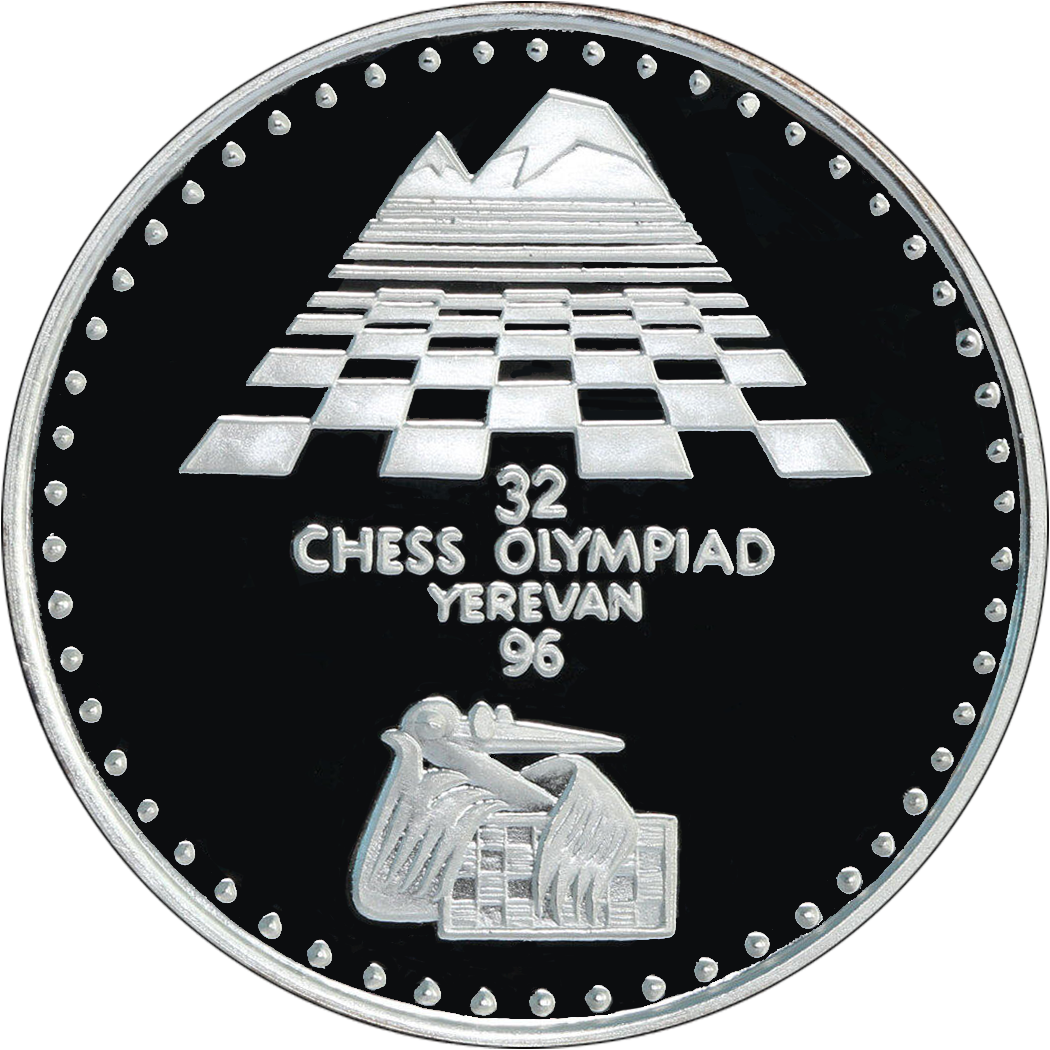
Commemorative coin of Armenia

The 32nd Chess Olympiad (Armenian: 32-րդ Շախմատային օլիմպիադա, 32-rd Shakhmatayin olimpiadan), organized by FIDE and comprising an open and a women's tournament, took place between September 15 and October 2, 1996, in Yerevan, Armenia. Both tournament sections were officiated by international arbiter Alesha Khachatrian of Armenia.

The Russian team won their third consecutive title, captained by PCA world champion Kasparov. Once again, due to a dispute with the national federation, FIDE champion Anatoly Karpov was not present. Ukraine, led by Ivanchuk, took the silver, and the United States returned to the medal ranks for the first time since the fall of the Iron Curtain, beating England by half a point on tie break—somewhat ironically, half of the US team were born in Eastern Europe.

In addition to the overall medal winners, the teams were divided into seeding groups, with the top finishers in each group receiving special prizes.

== Open event ==
The open division was contested by 114 teams representing 111 nations plus Armenia "B" and "C" as well as the International Braille Chess Association. Mali were signed up but didn't show up and were disqualified. Due to an odd number of participants, the hosts were allowed to field an additional third squad, but when team Yemen arrived after the second round, the number became odd again. However, Afghanistan set a new Olympic record by not showing up until round 8 and once again brought the total number of teams an even one.

The time control for each game permitted each player 2 hours to make the first 40 of his or her moves, then an additional 1-hour to make the next 20 moves. In the event of a draw, the tie-break was decided by 1. The Buchholz system; and 2. Match points.

Open event
#	Country	Players	Average rating	Points	Buchholz
1	Russia	Kasparov, Kramnik, Dreev, Svidler, Bareev, Rublevsky	2714	38½	
2	Ukraine	Ivanchuk, Malaniuk, Romanyshyn, Novikov, Onyschuk, Savchenko	2633	35	
3	United States	Gulko, Yermolinsky, De Firmian, Kaidanov, Benjamin, Christiansen	2595	34	448.0
4	England	Short, Adams, Speelman, Sadler, Hodgson, Conquest	2655	34	447.5
5	Armenia	Akopian, Vaganian, Lputian, Minasian, Anastasian, Petrosian	2593	33½	452.0
6	Spain	Shirov, Illescas, Magem, García, San Segundo, Izeta	2605	33½	451.5
7	Bosnia and Herzegovina	Sokolov, Nikolić, Kurajica, Dizdarević, Kelecević, Sinanović	2584	33½	439.5
8	Georgia	Azmaiparashvili, Giorgadze, Sturua, Zaichik, Janjgava, Supatashvili	2590	33	446.0
9	Bulgaria	Topalov, K. Georgiev, Spasov, Dimitrov, V. Georgiev, Chatalbashev	2619	33	443.0
10	Germany	Yusupov, Hübner, Dautov, Lobron, Hickl, Lutz	2619	33	440.0

#	Country	Average rating	Points	Buchholz	MP
11	Sweden	2544	33	434.0	
12	Iceland	2549	33	426.5	
13	China	2518	32½	448.5	
14	Netherlands	2564	32½	436.5	
15	Argentina	2529	32½	430.0	
=16	Croatia	2564	32	443.5	17
=16	Israel	2600	32	443.5	17
18	Hungary	2643	32	440.5	
19	Uzbekistan	2510	32	434.5	
20	Latvia	2515	32	424.5	
21	Cuba	2536	31½	438.5	
22	Yugoslavia	2540	31½	423.0	
23	Slovenia	2509	31½	419.5	
24	Greece	2563	31½	412.5	
25	France	2541	31	438.0	
26	Philippines	2470	31	431.5	
27	Vietnam	2478	31	412.0	
28	Australia	2465	31	411.5	
29	Canada	2454	31	397.5	
30	Kazakhstan	2511	30½	436.0	
31	Romania	2528	30½	434.5	
32	Czech Republic	2555	30½	432.5	
33	Belarus	2570	30½	426.5	
34	Slovakia	2508	30½	422.0	
35	North Macedonia	2478	30½	421.5	
36	Poland	2545	30½	420.0	
37	Lithuania	2546	30½	419.5	
38	Denmark	2519	30½	404.0	
39	Turkmenistan	2445	30½	390.0	
40	Norway	2535	30	409.0	
41	Peru	2476	30	407.5	
42	Armenia "C"	2400	30	404.0	
43	Colombia	2450	30	402.0	
44	Indonesia	2414	29½	426.5	
45	Moldova	2514	29½	411.5	
46	Finland	2419	29½	401.5	
47	Tajikistan	2283	29	398.5	
48	Austria	2408	29	393.5	
49	Estonia	2549	28½	438.5	
50	Armenia "B"	2456	28½	413.0	
51	Brazil	2446	28½	408.5	
52	Portugal	2451	28½	408.0	
53	Kyrgyzstan	2479	28½	395.5	
54	Belgium	2391	28½	391.0	
55	Ireland	2395	28½	389.5	
56	Scotland	2436	28½	381.0	
57	Italy	2468	28	404.5	
58	Switzerland	2448	28	400.0	
59	India	2449	28	397.0	
60	Syria	2080	28	364.5	
61	Bangladesh	2423	27½	411.5	
62	South Africa	2338	27½	395.0	
63	Luxembourg	2355	27½	388.0	
64	Malaysia	2274	27½	387.0	
65	United Arab Emirates	2254	27½	361.0	
66	Egypt	2384	27	393.5	
67	Morocco	2278	27	379.5	
68	Chile	2433	26½	405.0	
69	Turkey	2318	26½	396.5	
70	Tunisia	2369	26½	393.0	
71	Venezuela	2258	26½	386.0	
72	Iran	2238	26½	382.5	
73	IBCA	2236	27½	380.0	
74	Wales	2285	27½	379.5	
75	Ecuador	2301	27½	376.5	
76	Japan	2241	27½	375.5	
77	Uruguay	2261	26	375.5	
78	Hong Kong	2220	26	369.5	
79	Puerto Rico	2240	26	368.5	
80	Singapore	2291	26	367.0	
81	Faroe Islands	2256	26	361.5	
82	New Zealand	2311	25½	377.0	
83	Angola	2231	25½	371.0	
84	Andorra	2183	25½	363.5	
85	Yemen	2145	25½	363.0	
86	Liechtenstein	2239	25½	356.0	
87	Cyprus	2100	25½	351.5	
88	Paraguay	2328	25	379.0	
89	Barbados	2179	25	368.0	
90	Lebanon	2219	25	358.5	
91	Qatar	2204	25	346.5	
92	El Salvador	2058	24½	378.5	
93	Thailand	2165	24½	372.5	
94	Zimbabwe	2210	24½	357.5	
95	Nicaragua	2113	24½	354.5	
96	Uganda	2140	24½	348.5	
97	Malta	2094	24½	346.0	
98	Bahrain	2086	24½	344.0	
99	Botswana	2086	24	341.5	
100	Netherlands Antilles	2144	24	338.5	
101	San Marino	2030	23½	325.0	
102	Macau	2053	23½	304.5	
103	Haiti	2000	23		
104	Sri Lanka	2094	22½	335.0	
105	Monaco	2140	22½	319.0	
106	Mauritania	2000	22	323.5	
107	Bermuda	2031	22	317.5	
108	Mozambique	2000	21½	328.0	
109	Honduras	2000	21½	305.5	
110	Jersey	2024	20		
111	Guernsey	2000	18½		
112	Afghanistan	2000	17		
113	Seychelles	2033	16		
114	United States Virgin Islands	2000	9		

=== Individual medals ===
- Performance rating: (Russia) Garry Kasparov 2873
- Board 1: (Qatar) Mohamad Al-Modiahki 8 / 10 = 80.0%
- Board 2: (Bermuda) Richard Robinson 8 / 10 = 80.0%
- Board 3: (Uzbekistan) Saidali Iuldachev 11 / 14 = 78.6%
- Board 4: (England) Matthew Sadler 10½ / 13 = 80.8%
- 1st reserve: (Armenia) ("B") Karen Asrian 10 / 12 = 83.3%
- 2nd reserve: (Uganda) Geoffrey Makumbi 7½ / 8 = 93.8%

=== Best game ===
The 'Best game' prize went to Zurab Sturua (Georgia) – Rolando Kutirov (Macedonia) from round 3.

== Women's event ==
The women's division was contested by 74 teams representing 72 nations plus Armenia "B" and the International Braille Chess Association. The time control for each game permitted each player 2 hours to make the first 40 of her moves, then an additional 1-hour to make the next 20 moves. In the event of a draw, the tie-break was decided by 1. The Buchholz system; and 2. Match points.

The Georgian team, led by one former world champion (Chiburdanidze), won their third consecutive title. China, led by another former world champion (Xie Jun), took the silver, and Russia the bronze. Newly crowned champion Susan Polgar did not take part in the event for her new country, so a second-rate US team finished as low as 35th.

#	Country	Players	Average rating	Points	Buchholz
1	Georgia	Chiburdanidze, Ioseliani, Arakhamia-Grant, Gurieli	2498	30	
2	China	Xie Jun, Zhu Chen, Wang Lei, Wang Pin	2425	28½	347.0
3	Russia	Galliamova, Matveeva, Prudnikova, Zaitseva	2443	28½	345.5
4	Ukraine	Gaponenko, Litinskaya, Sedina, Zhukova	2343	26½	
5	Hungary	Sofia Polgar, Mádl, Medvegy, Lakos	2387	26	
6	Romania	Foișor, Corina Peptan, Radu-Cosma, Olărașu	2355	25½	
7	Israel	Klinova, Segal, Tsifanskaya, Pitam	2310	25	
8	Kazakhstan	Sakhatova, Uskova, Girkiyan-Klink, Sergeeva	2305	24½	340.5
9	Poland	Brustman, Bobrowska, Dworakowska, Zielińska	2330	24½	339.5
10	England	Lalic, Hunt, Sheldon, Bellin	2303	24	346.0

#	Country	Average rating	Points	Buchholz	MP
11	Indonesia	2178	24	309.5	
12	Czech Republic	2258	24	305.5	
13	Yugoslavia	2395	23½	335.5	
=14	Moldova	2322	23½	332.5	15
=14	Germany	2348	23½	332.5	15
16	Bulgaria	2335	23½	331.5	
17	Lithuania	2222	23½	321.5	
18	Greece	2252	23½	321.0	
=19	Cuba	2253	23½	316.5	16
=19	Armenia	2233	23½	316.5	16
21	Estonia	2258	23½	312.5	
22	Uzbekistan	2198	23½	291.5	
23	Slovakia	2250	23	328.0	
24	Vietnam	2197	23	321.0	
25	India	2152	23	316.0	
26	France	2211	23	314.0	
27	Mongolia	2115	23	275.5	
28	Slovenia	2195	22½	311.5	
29	Armenia "B"	2138	22½	310.5	
30	Netherlands	2210	22½	301.5	
31	Croatia	2242	22	312.0	
32	Belarus	2252	22	304.0	
33	Bosnia and Herzegovina	2110	22	303.5	
34	Latvia	2245	21½		
35	United States	2312	21½	314.0	
36	Spain	2245	21½	299.5	
37	Sweden	2108	21½	299.0	
38	Australia	2145	21½	298.0	
39	Canada	2123	21½	286.5	
40	Austria	2112	21½	285.5	
41	Denmark	2048	21½	283.0	
42	Kyrgyzstan	2112	20½	309.0	
43	North Macedonia	2105	20½	291.5	
44	Philippines	2015	20½	282.0	
45	Norway	2083	20½	280.5	
46	Brazil	2080	20½	278.0	
47	Finland	2065	20	290.5	
48	Turkmenistan	2048	20	287.0	
49	Italy	2010	20	282.0	
50	Venezuela	2043	20	280.5	
51	Mexico	2162	20	278.5	
52	Bangladesh	2093	20	274.5	
53	Switzerland	2140	19½	297.0	
54	Scotland	2022	19½	282.0	
55	Portugal	2133	19	282.0	
56	Ireland	2017	19	262.5	
57	IBCA	2000	19	245.5	
58	Puerto Rico	2002	19	240.0	
59	Colombia	2060	18½	277.0	
60	Iran	2033	18½	266.5	
61	Syria	2000	18½	229.0	
62	Netherlands Antilles	2000	18½	217.5	
63	Ecuador	2067	18	285.0	
64	Malaysia	2050	18	259.0	
65	Sri Lanka	2007	18	232.5	
66	New Zealand	2000	18	223.0	
67	Turkey	2002	17½	264.5	
68	United Arab Emirates	2017	17½	240.5	
69	Zambia	2002	16½		
70	Angola	2000	15	229.5	
71	Lebanon	2000	15	228.5	
72	Seychelles	2013	14½		
73	Japan	2000	8		
74	United States Virgin Islands	2000	2		

=== Individual medals ===
- Performance rating: (China) Zhu Chen 2561
- Board 1: (Turkmenistan) Mähri Ovezova 10½ / 14 = 75.0%
- Board 2: (China) Zhu Chen 10 / 13 = 76.9%
- Board 3: (Georgia (country)) Ketevan Arakhamia-Grant 8 / 10 = 80.0%
- Reserve: (Poland) Marta Zielińska 6 / 7 = 85.7%

== See also ==
- Chess in Armenia
