= Richard Robinson (chess player) =

Bermudian chess player

Personal information
- Born: 7 June 1956 New York City, New York

Chess career
- Country: United States; Bermuda
- Peak rating: 2120 (January 1997)

Richard Robinson is an American and Bermudian chess player, Chess Olympiad individual gold medal winner (1996).

== Biography ==
Richard Robinson was from New York City but he worked in Bermuda for many years. His peak success in chess was in 1996 in Yerevan, where he won the gold medal at second board in the Chess Olympiad individual rankings, ahead of his percentage Grandmaster Alex Yermolinsky.

At the USCF website he is listed as Richard D Robinson, from North Carolina, USCF National Master.
