= 100 Days (2026 film) =

2026 Brazilian Docudrama

- Promotional poster
- Portuguese: 100 Dias
- Directed by: Carlos Saldanha
- Screenplay by: Elena Soarez; Thais Tavares
- Based on: Cem Dias Entre Céu E Mar by Amyr Klink
- Produced by: Giuliano Cedroni; Paula Cosenza; João Queiroz Filho; Justine Otondo
- Starring: Filipe Bragança; Philippine Leroy-Beaulieu
- Cinematography: Rodrigo Monte
- Edited by: Fernando Stutz
- Music by: Tuomas Kantelinen
- Production companies: Ventre Studio; Boipeba Films; Good Hand Production; O2 Films; Trema Filmes; Total Post
- Distributed by: Buena Vista International
- Release dates: October 2026 (Festival do Rio); 29 October 2026 (Brazil)
- Country: Brazil
- Language: Portuguese

100 Days (Portuguese: 100 Dias) is a 2026 sea adventure action drama film directed by Carlos Saldanha. Based on One Hundred Days Between Sea and Sky, an autobiography by Amyr Klink, the film stars Filipe Bragança as Amyr Klink. Distributed by Buena Vista International, the film was released on 29 October 2026 in Brazil.

== Synopsis ==
In 1984, Amyr Klink rows alone across the South Atlantic in a tiny boat, doing something no one had tried before. In 100 Days, his journey from Africa to Brazil becomes a fight against fear, loneliness, and the limits of his own strength. While his body struggles with the ocean, his mind wrestles with old memories, family issues, and the choices that shaped his life. In the end, crossing the ocean is only one part of the challenge, he also has to face and cross through himself.

== Cast ==
- Filipe Bragança as Amyr Klink
  - Enzo Rosetti as Amyr child
- Philippine Leroy-Beaulieu as Asa Klink
- Felipe Camargo Felipe Camargo as Jamil Klink
- Gero Camilo as Doró
- João Vitor Silva as Tymur Klink
  - Gabriel Cano as Tymur child
- Duda Mamberti as Furia
- Martha Nowill as Flora
- Andre Horace Polushin as Commander Werner

== Production ==
In July 2021, it was reported that Carlos Saldanha would direct his first live-action feature, inspired by the true story of Brazilian explorer, sailor and writer Amyr Klink, who in 1984, at age 29, became the first person to row solo across the South Atlantic.

Principal photography began on 15 July 2024 in sprawling indoor water tank in a warehouse in São Paulo. Filming was wrapped up on 14 May 2025.

== Release ==
100 Days was screened in TIFF's Market under Market Screening programme at the 2026 Toronto International Film Festival on 13 September 2026. It competed in Premiére Brasil section of the Rio de Janeiro International Film Festival on 10 October 2026.

It was released in Brazilian theatres on 29 October 2026.

The film was shortlisted for Brazilian submission for the 99th Academy Awards for Best International Feature Film.
