= Jörg Hickl =

German chess grandmaster (born 1965)

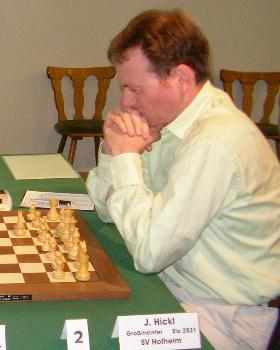
- Jörg Hickl, 2005

Personal information
- Born: 16 April 1965 (age 61) Wiesbaden, West Germany

Chess career
- Country: Germany
- Title: Grandmaster (1988)
- FIDE rating: 2545 (July 2026)
- Peak rating: 2605 (October 2002)
- Peak ranking: No. 67 (July 1996)

Jörg Hickl (born 16 April 1965) is a German chess grandmaster. He was German Chess Champion in 1998.

== Chess career ==
Born on 16 April 1965, Hickl began playing chess at the age of 9, at the Wallrabenstein Chess Club. He won the Hessen U15 Chess Championship in 1979, and was German U17 Chess Champion in 1981. He competed in the World Junior Chess Championship in 1983, sharing fifth. He earned his international master title in 1986. At the Holon Open, held from December 1986 to January 1987, he shared first with Jacob Murey, Yehuda Gruenfeld and Gerald Hertneck. He earned his first grandmaster (GM) norm at the 1987 Munich zonal, placing second with 10/14 (+6–0=8). This result qualified him for the Interzonal.

He earned his second and third GM norms at tournaments in Tel Aviv, and was awarded the title in 1988. He finished second in the 1988 Biel GM Tournament, and third in the 1989 European Individual Chess Championship and 1989 Dortmund Sparkassen Chess Meeting. He won the 1991 La Réunion Open. He shared first at the Rubinstein Memorial in 1993, placing second on tiebreaks. In 1995, he won the Calcutta, Bad Ragaz, Maintal and Seefeld Opens. He won the Jakarta GM tournament in 1996, and shared first at the 1997 Reykjavík Hellis International Open with Ludger Keitlinghaus and Jonny Hector.

Hickl's most notable result is winning the German Chess Championship in 1998, scoring 6½/9 (+4–0=5).

From 1986 to 2002, Hickl competed in six international competitions for West Germany/Germany: four times at the Chess Olympiad (1986, 1988, 1996, 2002) and two times at the European Team Chess Championship (1989, 1992). His overall Olympiad score is 20/35 (+14–9=12), and his overall European Team Championship score is 10/14 (+7–1=6). He was the top performer on the first reserve board, scoring 6/8 (+4–0=4} for a performance rating of 2612, at the 1992 European Team Championship.

== Books ==
- The Power of Pawns: Chess Structure Fundamentals for Post-Beginners, 2016
- Play 1...d6 Against Everything: A Compact and Ready-To-Use Black Repertoire for Club Players, 2017
