= Klinck =

Klinck is a surname. Notable people with the surname include:

- Anne Klinck (1943–2023) Canadian literary historian and academic
- Carl Klinck (1908–1990), Canadian literary historian and academic
- Kristian Klinck (born 1979), German teacher and politician
- Leonard Klinck (1877–1969), second President of University of British Columbia
- Matthiew Klinck (born 1978), director and producer
- Todd Klinck (born 1974), writer and pornography producer

== See also ==
- Klink
