= Mia Žnidarič =

Slovenian jazz singer

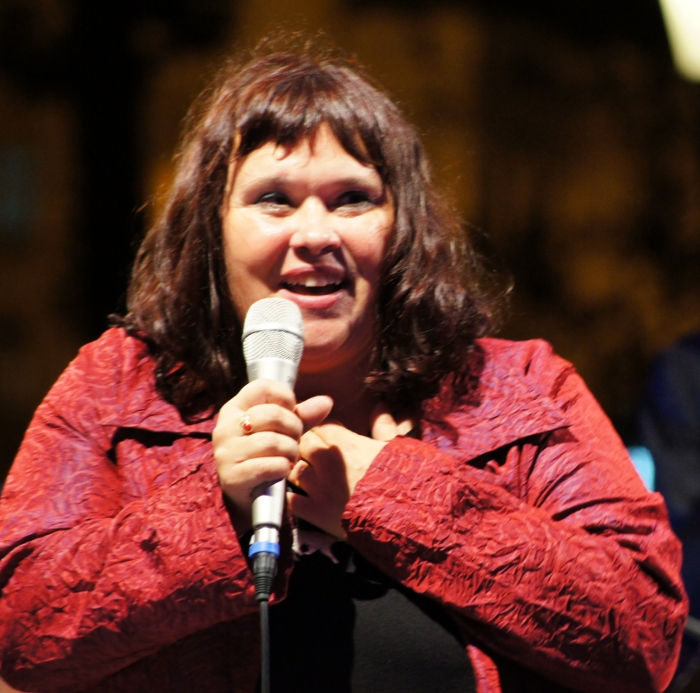
- Žnidarič in 2011

Background information
- Born: December 9, 1962 (age 63)
- Origin: Ruše, Slovenia
- Genres: Jazz
- Occupation: Vocalist
- Years active: 1988–present
- Website: Mia Žnidarič

Mia Žnidarič (born 9 December 1962) is a Slovenian jazz singer.

== History ==
Mia's jazz career started, when Mia met Slovenian composer and actor Nino de Gleria at age 27. Mia has moved from Maribor to Ljubljana with him and started singing jazz at bars. She took solo singing lessons with Nada Žgur and Jasna Spiller. She met Vinci Vogue Anžlovar, who asked her to sing in his movie Babica gre na jug, which made Mia recognisable to wider audience. She used to hold concerts in a popular discothèque Turist in the center of Ljubljana. In 1996, she was awarded for her albums Hold My Hand, and the year after for her second album I wish I Know How. Mia has met her husband American piano player Steve Klink when she was 32 years old. The success of their relationship results in their albums Hold My Hand and a few years after Pobarvanka. Currently Mia has concerts with Steve Klink trio in Slovenia and abroad.

== Discography ==
- Hold My Hand (1995)
- I Wish I Knew How (1996)
- Pobarvanka (1997)
- Iskre (2000)
- Kaj ti je deklica (2000)
- My Favorite Things / A si ti al nisi ti moj ljubi (2003)
- Preblizu predaleč (2004)
- Nevidni orkester (2008)
- Love you madly (2011)
