= Félix Izeta Txabarri =

Spanish chess grandmaster (born 1961)

Personal information
- Born: 3 August 1961 (age 64) Zestoa, Spain

Chess career
- Country: Spain (until 2022); Senegal (since 2022)
- Title: Grandmaster (1994)
- FIDE rating: 2452 (July 2026)
- Peak rating: 2525 (July 1996)

Félix Izeta Txabarri (born 3 August 1961) is a Spanish Basque chess grandmaster that plays for Senegal.

== Biography ==
In the 1990s Félix Izeta Txabarri was one of the leading Spanish chess players. He has participated in international chess tournaments many times. In 1990, Félix Izeta Txabarri won tournament in Ermua. In 1993/94, in Pamplona he shared 1st place with Jordi Magem Badals and Andrei Sokolov. Félix Izeta Txabarri won the San Sebastián international chess tournament twice, in 1995 and 1997, and shared 1st place in 1993 with Bojan Kurajica and in 1994 with Ulf Andersson and Zenón Franco Ocampos. Also twice in a row he shared 1st place in Elgoibar international chess tournaments (1995, 1996).

Félix Izeta Txabarri played for Spain in the Chess Olympiads:

- In 1996, at second reserve board in the 32nd Chess Olympiad in Yerevan (+4, =2, -1).

Félix Izeta Txabarri played for Spain in the European Team Chess Championships:

- In 1989, at fifth board in the 9th European Team Chess Championship in Haifa (+5, =2, -2),
- In 1992, at first reserve board in the 10th European Team Chess Championship in Debrecen (+5, =2, -2),
- In 1997, at fourth board in the 11th European Team Chess Championship in Pula (+3, =3, -2),
- In 1999, at first reserve board in the 12th European Team Chess Championship in Batumi (+1, =4, -1).

In 1985, he was awarded the FIDE International Master (IM) title and received the FIDE Grandmaster (GM) title in 1994.

He currently lives in Dakar and represents Senegal.
