= Vladimir Dimitrov (chess player) =

Bulgarian chess grandmaster (born 1968)

Personal information
- Born: 11 April 1968 (age 58) Sofia, Bulgaria

Chess career
- Country: Bulgaria
- Title: Grandmaster (1993)
- Peak rating: 2530 (July 1996)

Vladimir Dimitrov (Bulgarian: Владимир Димитров; born 11 April 1968) is a Bulgarian chess Grandmaster (GM) (1993).

== Biography ==
In the 1990s and 2000s, Vladimir Dimitrov was one of the leading Bulgaria chess players. He participated in the individual Bulgarian Chess Championship finals many times, in 2006 in Svilengrad he won the bronze medal.

Vladimir Dimitrov's international chess tournaments successes include:

- shared 1st place with Giorgi Giorgadze in Mondariz (1994),
- shared 1st place in Paris Open Chess Championship (2000),
- shared 1st place in Marín (2001),
- won 1st place in Vukovar (2001),
- shared 1st place with Evgenij Ermenkov and Aleksander Delchev in Borovets (2002),
- shared 1st place in Sofia (2006),
- shared 1st place in Cambados (2006),
- shared 1st place with Ilmārs Starostīts in Ortigueira (2007).

Vladimir Dimitrov played for Bulgaria in the Chess Olympiads:

- In 1994, at first reserve board in the 31st Chess Olympiad in Moscow (+5, =1, -2),
- In 1996, at fourth board in the 32nd Chess Olympiad in Yerevan (+1, =2, -3).

Vladimir Dimitrov played for Bulgaria in the European Team Chess Championships:

- In 1989, at fourth board in the 9th European Team Chess Championship in Haifa (+1, =0, -2),
- In 1992, at second reserve board in the 10th European Team Chess Championship in Debrecen (+3, =2, -4).

Vladimir Dimitrov played for Bulgaria in the Men's Chess Balkaniads:

- In 1990, at fifth board in the 21st Chess Balkaniad in Kavala (+1, =5, -0) and won team bronze and individual gold medals,
- In 1992, at third board in the 23rd Chess Balkaniad in Mangalia (+1, =1, -1) and won team silver and individual bronze medal,
- In 1993, at third board in the 24th Chess Balkaniad in Ankara (+1, =2, -1) and won team gold medal,
- In 1994, at third board in the 25th Chess Balkaniad in Varna (+3, =1, -1) and won team gold and individual silver medals.

In 1988, he was awarded the FIDE International Master (IM) title and received the FIDE Grandmaster (GM) title five years later.
