= Famke =

Feminine given name

- Pronunciation: Dutch: [ˈfɑmkə] West Frisian: [ˈfamkə]
- Gender: Feminine
- Languages: Dutch, West Frisian

Origin
- Language: West Frisian
- Meaning: girl

Other names
- Variant form: Femke
- Related names: Femme

Famke (Dutch pronunciation: [ˈfɑmkə]) is a Dutch and West Frisian feminine given name of West Frisian origin. Its popularity peaked in 2002. It is variant form of Femke.

== Etymology ==
Famke was originally a West Frisian name. The West Frisian word famke means 'girl'. The Meertens Institute relates the name Famke, like the name Femke, to the West Frisian masculine name Femme.

== Popularity ==
In the Netherlands, the popularity of the name Famke peaked in 2002 with 117 newborns; as of 2017, 1,779 women (0.0238%) have Famke as a first name and 236 women (0.0032%) have it as a middle name.

== People named Famke ==
People with the given name Famke include:

- Famke Janssen (born 1964), Dutch actress
- Famke Louise (born 1998), Dutch YouTuber and singer
