= Maaike Vos =

Dutch speed skater

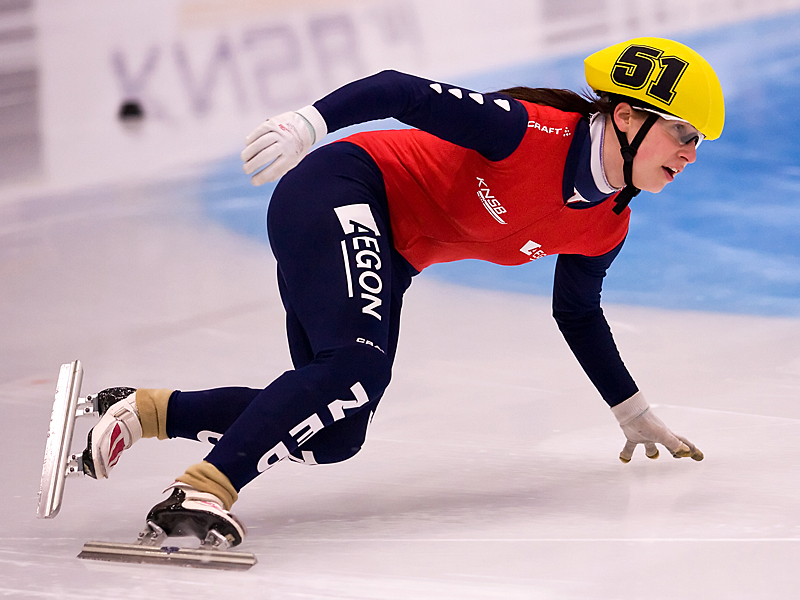

Personal information
- Born: May 27, 1985 (age 41) Sappemeer, Netherlands
- Height: 5 ft 3 in (160 cm)
- Weight: 115 lb (52 kg)

Sport
- Country: Netherlands
- Sport: Short track speed skating

Achievements and titles
- Highest world ranking: 29 (500m)

Maaike Vos (born 27 May 1985) is a Dutch short track speed skater.

Vos competed at the 2010 Winter Olympics for the Netherlands. She was a member of the Dutch 3000 metre relay team, which finished third in the semifinals and won the B Final, ending up fourth overall.

As of 2013, Vos' best finish at the World Championships is seventh, in 2010 as a member of the Dutch relay team. Her best individual performance is 21st, in the 2007 1500 metres. She has also won three bronze medals as a member of the Dutch relay team at the European Championships.

As of 2013, Vos has not finished on the podium on the ISU Short Track Speed Skating World Cup. Her top World Cup ranking is 29th, in the 500 metres in 2006–07.
