= Steve Klink =

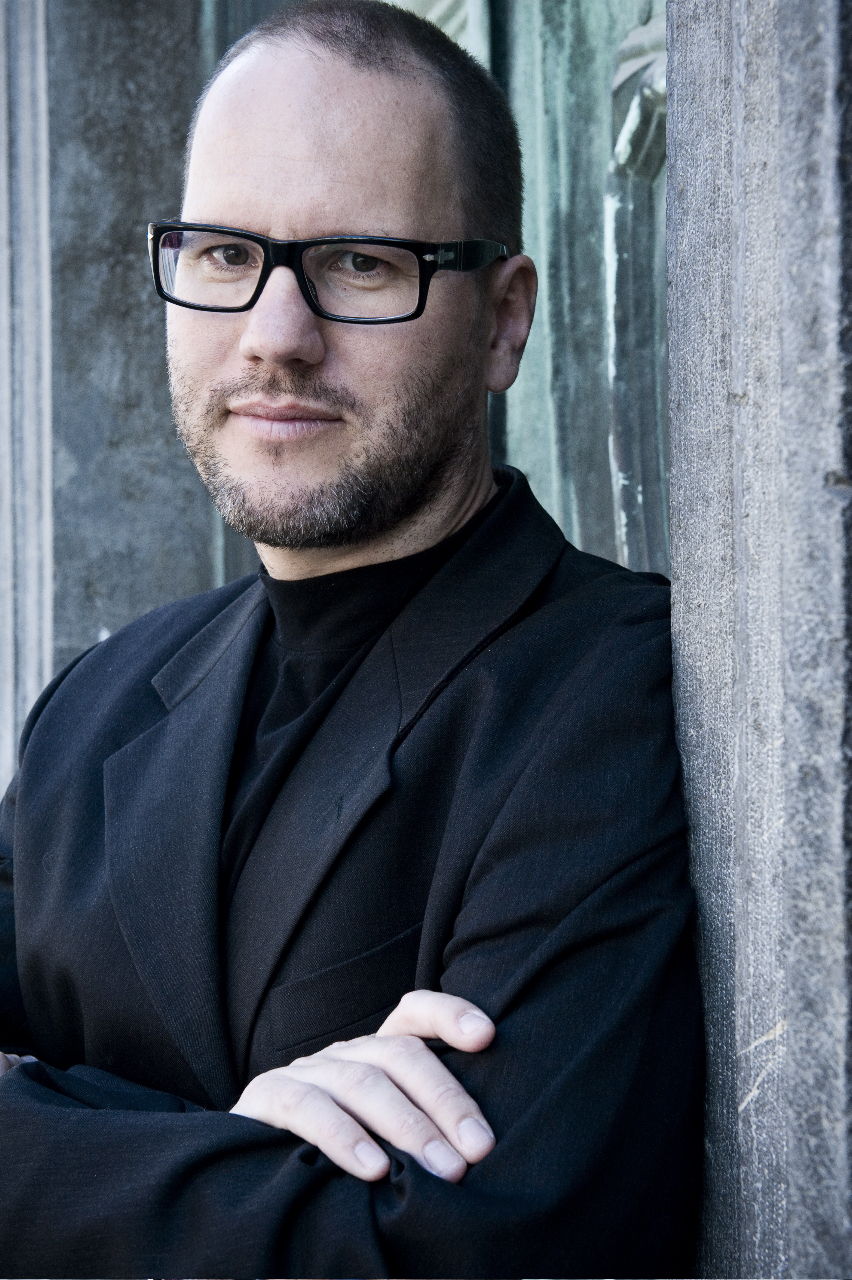

Background information
- Origin: United States
- Genres: Jazz, Folk-Bop, Blues
- Occupations: pianist, composer, arranger
- Instrument: keyboard instrument/piano
- Label: DMG/Broken Silence
- Website: SteveKlink.com

Steve Klink is an American composer and jazz pianist.

Steve Klink's funky piano style together with his distinct songwriting and arranging abilities makes for a striking blend of jazz, gospel, swing, blues and folk music.

Steve has performed extensively for television and radio with his Steve Klink trio, and in the last 6 years alone has performed over four hundred concerts. He also performs with his wife Slovenian jazz vocalist Mia Žnidarič.

Steve Klink trio have released 13 CDs. In 1999, with the support of ACT Music's Ziggy Loch, Steve was able to release Blue Suit with drummer Gregory Hutchinson. In 2000 Steve was invited by Minor Music label chief Stephan Meyner to produce a series of CDs featuring songs by two of today's most revered and venerable songwriters, Joni Mitchell and Randy Newman.

== Partial Discography of Steve Klink trio ==
- Invisible Orchestra
- Blue suit
- Feels like home
- Places to come from, places to go
- Too close for comfort
- Under the influence
- Iskre
- Pobarvanka
- I wish I knew how
- Hold my hand
- Live in Concert
- Searching the Blue

Their latest album is The Ocean, released in 2012.
