= David García Ilundáin =

Spanish chess grandmaster (1971–2002)

Personal information
- Born: 2 April 1971 Barcelona, Spain
- Died: 19 June 2002 (aged 31)

Chess career
- Country: Spain
- Title: Grandmaster (1996)
- Peak rating: 2550 (January 1996)

David García Ilundáin (2 April 1971 — 18 June 2002) was a Spanish chess Grandmaster (GM).

== Biography ==
García participated in the 1988 World Youth Chess Championship in the U18 age group, and also in the 1991 World Junior Chess Championship in U20 age group. One of his first successes in the international arena was in 1991, when he shared 3rd place in international chess tournament in Montpellier. In 1992 he shared 3rd place in the Open tournament in Candas. In 1993, he shared 1st - 6th place in the Spanish Chess Championship. In 1994, García shared 2nd place in Open tournament in Las Palmas, and in 1995 he shared 2nd place in Manresa and Benasque. In the following years García achieved further successes, including a shared 1st place in León (1996, tournament B), a shared 2nd place in Terrassa (1996), 1st place in Fomento (1998), a shared 2nd place in Montcada i Reixac (1999), and a shared 1st place in Paretana (1999).

Notably, García played for Spain in the 1996 Chess Olympiad and 1997 the European Team Chess Championship. In 1996, he was awarded the FIDE Grandmaster title.

García played in chess tournaments until the end of 2001. Six months later, he died due to a brain tumour.
