= Frieda Klink =

American singer

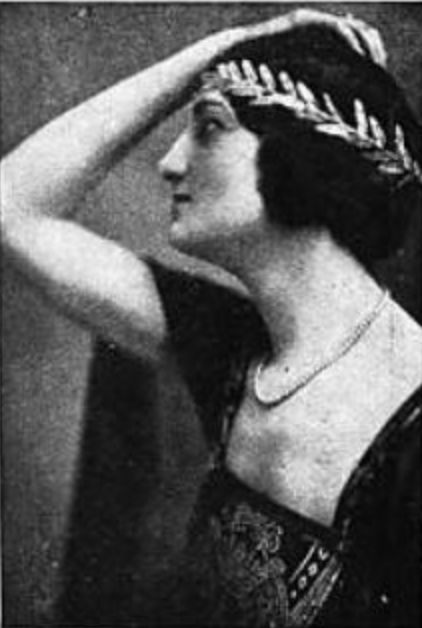
- Frieda Klink, from a 1922 publication
- Born: May 27, 1889; Indianapolis, Indiana, U.S.
- Died: June 9, 1948 (aged 59); Indianapolis, Indiana, U.S.
- Occupation: Singer

Frieda Klink (May 27, 1889 – June 9, 1948) was an American contralto singer from Indiana, heard in concert, recital, and oratorio presentations in the 1920s.

== Early life and education ==
Klink was born in Indianapolis, the daughter of Wilhelm Karl (William Carl) Klink and Elizabeth Kunz Klink. Both of her parents and some of her older siblings were born in Germany. Her father died in 1902. Her mother owned a millinery shop, where she worked as a young woman. She trained as a singer with Oscar Seagle. She also studied with Jean de Reszke in France.

== Career ==
Klink sang in the contralto or mezzo-contralto ranges. In 1921 she made her debut in a recital at Aeolian Hall, displaying "a lovely deep-toned voice, so flexible that the softest notes penetrated the deepest recesses of the hall, and the ease and grace of the singer contributed to the afternoon's pleasure", according to one newspaper account. She was a soloist with the New York Symphony Orchestra, sang the role of Fricka in Die Walküre with the United States Grand Opera Company on tour in 1922. She was a soloist in a 1922 production of the oratorio The Apocalypse at Carnegie Hall, with Elsa Stralia and Ines Barbour. She was also a soloist at a 1922 Goldman concert on the Green at Columbia University. In 1923 she gave a concert in Glens Falls, New York, as part of a women's club lyceum course.

In 1925, Klink was the lead contralto in 61 performances of the State Opera in Magdeburg. Later in life, Klink performed and taught music in Indianapolis. She was an honorary member of Sigma Alpha Iota.

== Death ==
Klink died in 1948, at the age of 59, in Indianapolis.
