= Femke Verstichelen =

Belgian cyclist

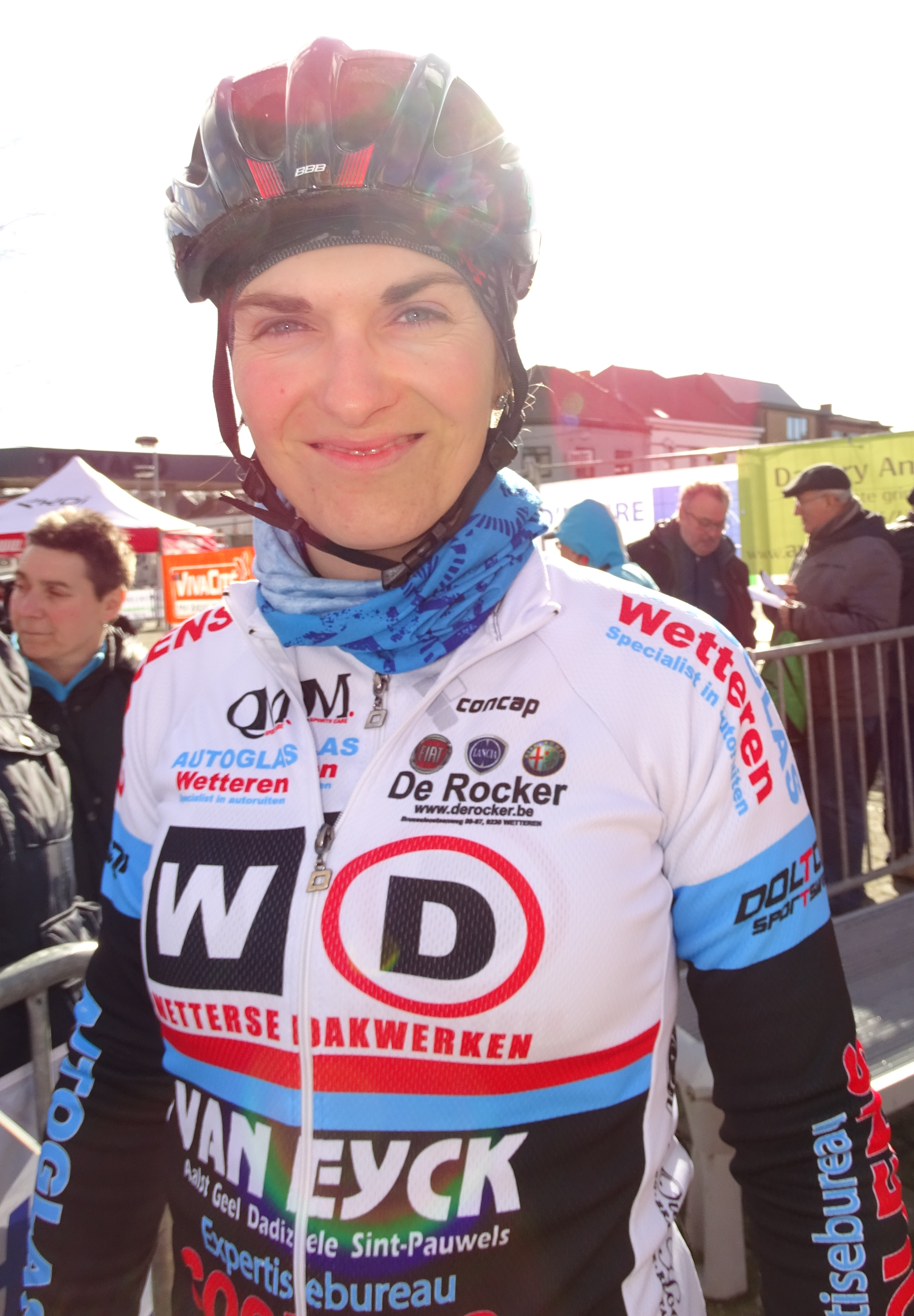
- Verstichelen at Le Samyn in 2016

Personal information
- Born: 22 March 1984 (age 42) Aalst, Belgium

Cycling career
- Sport: Cycling
- Disciplines: Road; Track
- Role: Rider

Amateur teams
- 2012: Wimi Games St. Martinus
- 2012: Endura Lady Force
- 2013–2014: Autoglas Wetteren-Group Solar
- 2015: De Sprinters Malderen
- 2016: Autoglas Wetteren

Professional teams
- 2004: Flanders-Afin.com
- 2017: Servetto Giusta
- 2017: Bizkaia–Durango
- 2018: Servetto–Makhymo–Beltrami TSA
- 2019: Isorex No-Aqua Ladies Cycling Team
- 2019: Memorial Santos
- 2020: Lviv Cycling Team

Femke Verstichelen (pronounced [ˈfɛmkə vərˈstɪxələ(n)]; born 22 March 1984) is a Belgian professional racing cyclist, who last rode for Lviv Cycling Team in 2020.

== Life and career ==
Verstichelen is a transgender woman. She debuted in male cyclist teams in 2004, and women categories in 2012.

== Major results ==
2013
10th Belgian National Time Trial Championships

2017
9th Belgian National Road Race Championships

2022
1st Ladies Cycling Trophy
