= Amyr Klink =

Brazilian explorer, sailor and writer (born 1955)

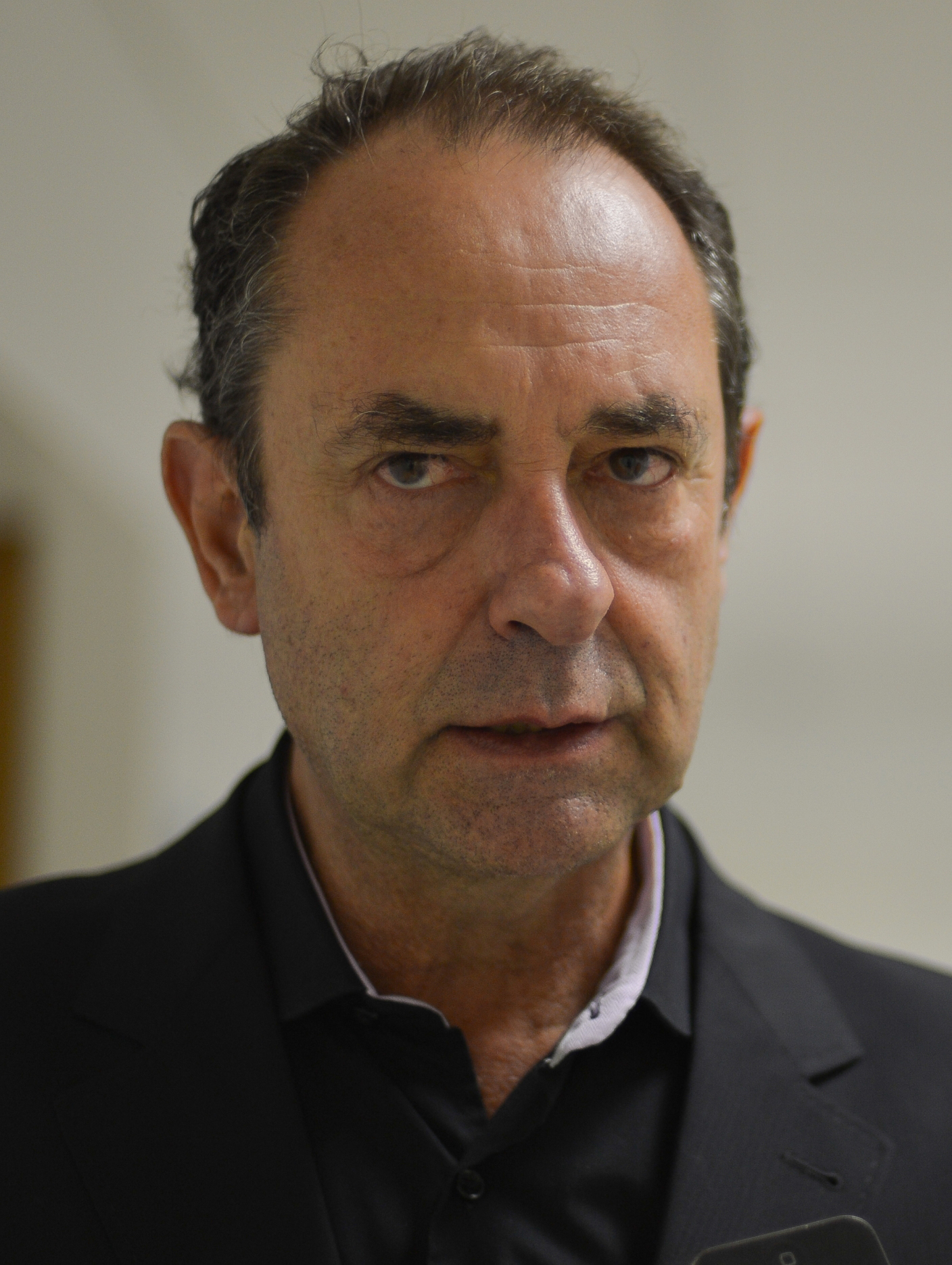
- Born: Amyr Khan Klink; 25 September 1955 (age 70); São Paulo, Brazil
- Occupations: Explorer; sailor; writer
- Spouse: Marina Bandeira (m. 1996)
- Children: 3, including Tamara

Amyr Klink (born 25 September 1955) is a Brazilian explorer, sailor and writer. One of his projects, "Antarctica 360", was circumnavigating the Antarctic continent on his own, in 88 days between 1998 and 1999.

== Career ==
Amyr Klink was the first person to row across the South Atlantic, leaving from Lüderitz, Namibia on 10 June 1984 and arriving 100 days later in Camaçari, Brazil, on 18 September 1984. He embarked on this journey without telling his father. His chronicles 100 Days Between Sea and Sky reports on the journey. The food portions in this trip were compacted into packages of freeze-dried food, especially designed for him by a food processing company in Brazil. Disney acquired the rights to make a film based on the events of Klink's journey. The 2026 biographical film 100 Dias was directed by Carlos Saldanha, and written by Elena Soarez. Brazilian actor Filipe Bragança portrays Amyr Klink.

Klink has written seven books about his voyages, including Between Two Poles about his trip from Antarctica to the Arctic Pole, starting in 1989 and taking 642 days. Klink helped in the construction of the polar vessel used in this trip, named Paratii after the town of Paraty in the state of Rio de Janeiro, Brazil.

In 1999 Klink completed a solo circumnavigation of Antarctica over 88 days. He was credited as the first to take the shortest and most dangerous route around Antarctica.

In 2002, Klink has completed an experimental phase of one of his project, "A Trip to China", a trip around the world through a maritime path that had never been explored before: the Arctic Circle.

The project's first phase was successfully accomplished between 30 January and 6 April 2002. Later, Klink and crew left the Antarctic Circle, visiting Margarida Bay in the Bellingshausen Sea (in the extreme south of the Antarctic Peninsula). From there, the ship stopped in South Georgia before returning to Brazil.

== Personal life ==
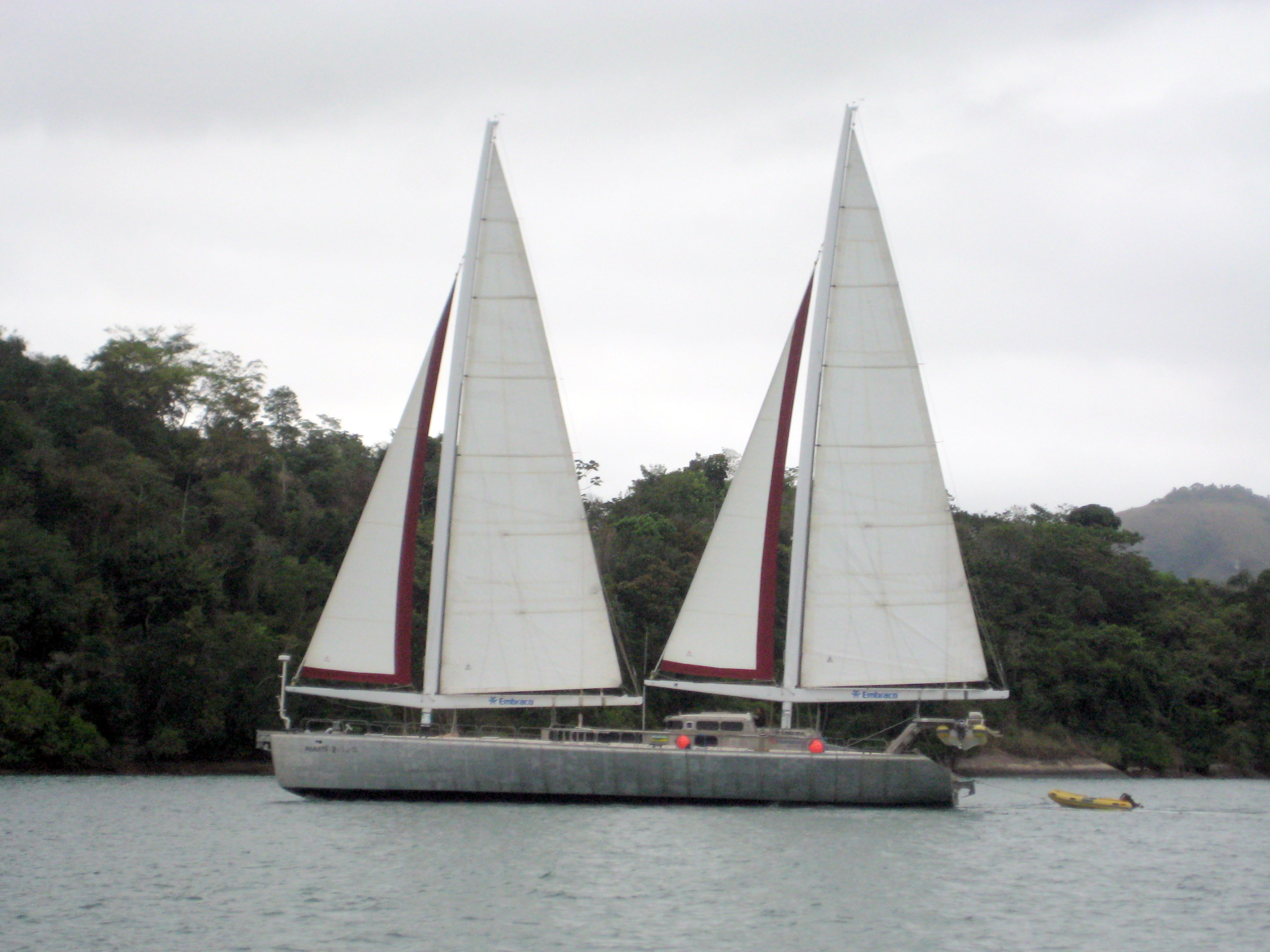
Amyr Klinks polar vessel "Paratii 2"

Amyr was born to a Lebanese father and a Swedish mother. He moved to Paraty when he was two. Klink is a member of the Royal Geographical Society.

He married Marina Bandeira in 1996 and has three daughters. In late 2021, Klink's daughter Tamara completed a solo sail across the Atlantic after accompanying her father on various expeditions.

== Bibliography ==
- Mar Sem Fim (Endless Sea) (ISBN 8571649898)
- As Janelas do Paraty (The Windows of Paraty) (ISBN 8535909400)
- Paratii entre Dois Pólos (Between Two Poles) (ISBN 8571642826)
- Cem Dias entre Céu e Mar (100 Days Between Sea and Sky) (ISBN 8535906428)
- Gestão de Sonhos, Riscos e Oportunidades (Dreams, Risks and Opportunities Management) (ISBN 8585651490)
- Os Portos do Mundo e o Porto do Rio (The Ports of the World and the Port of Rio)
- Construindo o Futuro (Building the Future)
- Linha-d'Água: Entre Estaleiros e Homens do Mar (Waterline: Between Shipyards and Sailors) (ISBN 8535909400)
- Dias na Antártica: Imagens de um Expedição de Amyr Klink (Days in Antarctica: Images of an Expedition of Amyr Klink) (ISBN 8599070010)

== In popular culture ==
In 2026 film 100 Days directed by Carlos Saldanha, the Brazilian actor Filipe Bragança portrayed Amyr Klink, which is based on his autobiography Cem Dias Entre Céu E Mar.
