= Ilse and Femke van Velzen =

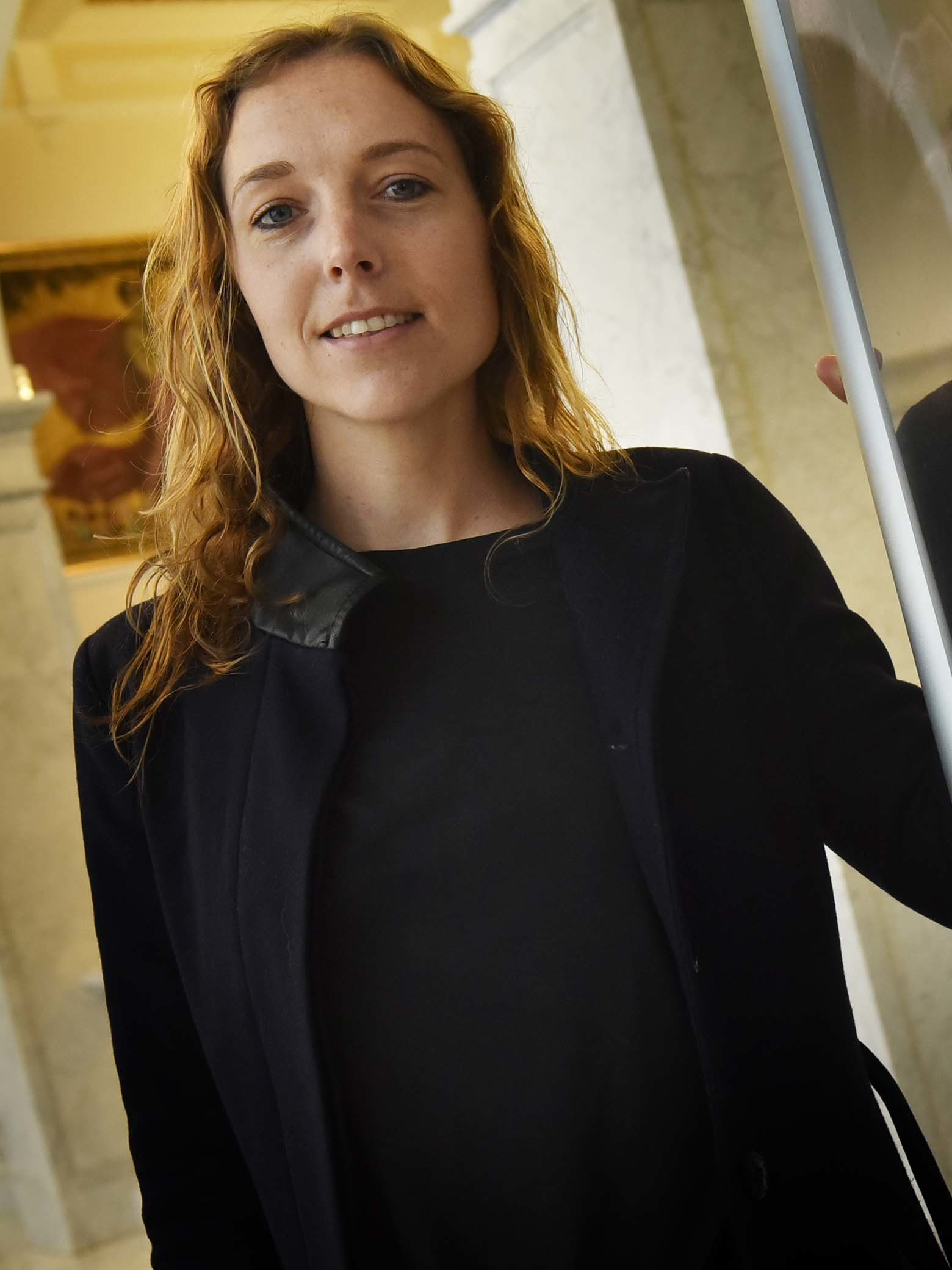
- Femke van Velzen in 2016
- Born: 11 October 1980 (age 45); Delft, Netherlands
- Occupation: Filmmakers

Ilse van Velzen (pronounced [ˈɪlsə vɑɱ ˈvɛlzə(n)]; born 11 October 1980) and Femke van Velzen (pronounced [ˈfɛmkə vɑɱ ˈvɛlzə(n)]; born 11 October 1980) are Dutch documentary filmmakers. They direct and produce independent documentaries.

== Biography ==
Identical twins, Ilse and Femke van Velzen, were born on 11 October 1980 in Delft. Both chose to study Cultural and Social Development, one in Utrecht, and the other in Amsterdam. Rather than produce separate thesis, during their final year of university they created a joint venture. Opting for the medium of film, they made the documentary Bush Kids in South Africa. Since 2004, with Return to Angola, they specialise in making documentaries in the developing world.

In 2007 Fighting the Silence premiered during IDFA, which is part of a trilogy. The film collects stories of different women who suffered sexual abuse during the war in Congo. Only two years later they made the documentary Weapon of War: Confessions of Rape by Rebels and Military (2009), a 60-minute film about sexual violence as a weapon of war in the Democratic Republic of Congo. Justice For Sale (2011), is Ilse and Femke's latest film. The 83 minutes documentary follows Claudine, a young and courageous human rights lawyer, in her struggle against injustice and widespread impunity in Congo. The sisters are currently working on a new documentary set in South Sudan, entitled A Haunting History.

In 2010, the two filmmakers established the Mobile Cinema Foundation, with the aim of bringing back their films in the form of outreach campaigns in the countries where they were shot. For the educational projects, tailor-made films are developed and screened in travelling mobile cinema. After each screening, debates and discussions are guided by moderators to inform people about sexual violence and the juridical system in the Democratic Republic of Congo.

== Filmography ==
- Bushkids (2002)
- Return to Angola (2004)
- Fighting the Silence (2007)
- Weapon of War (2009)
- Justice for Sale (2011)
- A Haunting History (2016)
