= Femke Diercks =

Dutch art historian and curator

- Occupations: Art historian, curator
- Years active: 2018–present
- Employer(s): Rijksmuseum, Amsterdam
- Title: Head of Decorative Arts

Femke Diercks (born 1984) is a Dutch art historian and curator. Since 2018 she has been Head of Decorative Arts at the Rijksmuseum Amsterdam.

== Early life and education ==
Diercks studied art history at the University of Groningen. During her undergraduate studies her primary focus was on painting. An internship at the Peabody Essex Museum (PEM) in Salem, Massachusetts introduced her to decorative arts and object-based research.

Her master’s thesis examined the collection of the Backer family, an Amsterdam patrician family whose portraits and decorative arts were placed on long-term loan to the Amsterdam Museum in 1910. The thesis was later developed into a publication accompanying an exhibition at Museum Willet-Holthuysen.

== Rijksmuseum ==
Shortly after completing her Master’s degree, Diercks was appointed junior curator of Decorative Arts at the Rijksmuseum. Early in her tenure she worked with senior curator Reinier Baarsen on the collection catalogue Paris 1650–1900: Decorative Arts in the Rijksmuseum.

Following a period as junior curator at Museum De Lakenhal in Leiden, Diercks returned to the Rijksmuseum as Curator of Ceramics and Glass. She was involved in the final stages of the museum’s gallery installation prior to its reopening in 2013, overseeing the placement and interpretation of ceramics and glass in the renewed displays.

She is a member of CODART, the international network for curators of Dutch and Flemish art.

=== Asia in Amsterdam ===
After the reopening, Diercks contributed to the exhibition 'Asia in Amsterdam', a collaboration between the Rijksmuseum and the Peabody Essex Museum. The exhibition examined the influence of Asian luxury goods in the seventeenth-century Netherlands and brought together Asian export art, Dutch decorative arts, and paintings.

In a 2022 curatorial roundtable published in the Journal of Historians of Netherlandish Art, she reflected on the exhibition’s engagement with global trade, material culture, and cross-cultural exchange in the Dutch Republic.

== Head of Decorative Arts ==
In 2018 Diercks was appointed Head of Decorative Arts in addition to her responsibilities as ceramics curator. Her work includes collection research, exhibitions, acquisitions, and public programming.

In 2024 the Rijksmuseum presented Een dag uit het leven in de tijd van Rembrandt, Vermeer en Frans Hals, an immersive presentation on daily life in the seventeenth century. The project focused on domestic interiors and everyday objects from the museum’s collection.

The program was also presented internationally as At Home in the 17th Century.

== Delftware research project ==
Since 2016 Diercks has been involved in a major research project on the Rijksmuseum’s Delftware collection. The nucleus of the collection derives from the 1916 donation of the Delftware collection of John Francis Loudon (1821–1895).
