= Maaike van Klink =

Dutch footballer

Personal information
- Date of birth: 8 April 2000 (age 26)
- Place of birth: Leidschendam, Netherlands
- Height: 5 ft 7 in (1.70 m)
- Position: Goalkeeper

Youth career
- –2017: Voorschoten '97
- 2017–2018: ADO Den Haag

College career
Years	Team	Apps	(Gls)
2022	FIU Panthers	7	(0)

Senior career*
Years	Team	Apps	(Gls)
2018–2020	ADO Den Haag U21		
2020–2022	ADO Den Haag	1	(0)
- * Club domestic league appearances and goals

Maaike Hendrickje Petra van Klink (born 8 April 2000) is a Dutch footballer who plays as a goalkeeper. She previously played for ADO Den Haag in the Netherlands and for the FIU Panthers in the United States.

== Early life and education ==
Van Klink was born in Leidschendam and grew up in Voorschoten, where she started playing soccer. In 2018, she graduated from the Adelbert College high school in Wassenaar. She earned her bachelor's degree in international politics from Leiden University. In 2022, Van Klink moved to Florida International University in the U.S., where she is pursuing a two-year graduate degree in global affairs, and is goalkeeper for the FIU Golden Panthers women's soccer team, playing in NCAA Division I.

== Career ==
Van Klink started playing with boys on the youth team at Voorschoten '97 at the age of seven, moving into goal from her second season.

=== ADO Den Haag ===
Van Klink transferred to ADO Den Haag youth in 2017. From 2020 to 2022, she was the reserve goalkeeper for the ADO Den Haag women's first team. She made her Eredivisie debut in April 2021 against AFC Ajax, when starting goalkeeper and Dutch international Barbara Lorsheyd was injured, 20 minutes before the end of the match.

=== FIU Panthers ===
In summer 2022 Van Klink joined the FIU Panthers based in Miami, United States. On 23 October 2022, she played in goal against the Charlotte 49ers. Campus media outlet PantherNOW commented, "Her stellar performance saw the score end at 0–0 when the final whistle blew. Van Klink was an impenetrable wall in goal as she saved every shot Charlotte had on target."
