= Tamara Klink (sailor) =

Brazilian sailor and writer

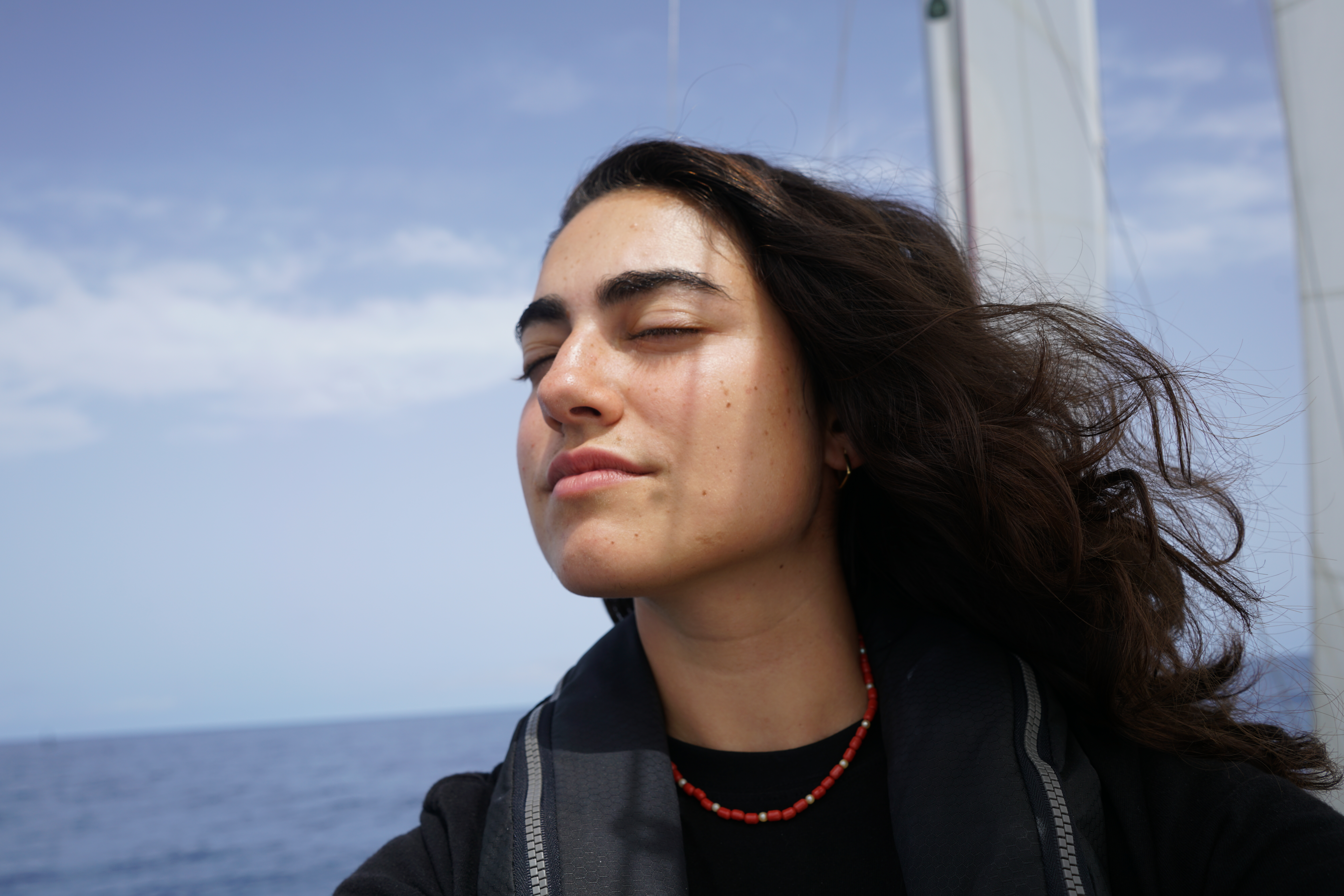
Tamara Klink

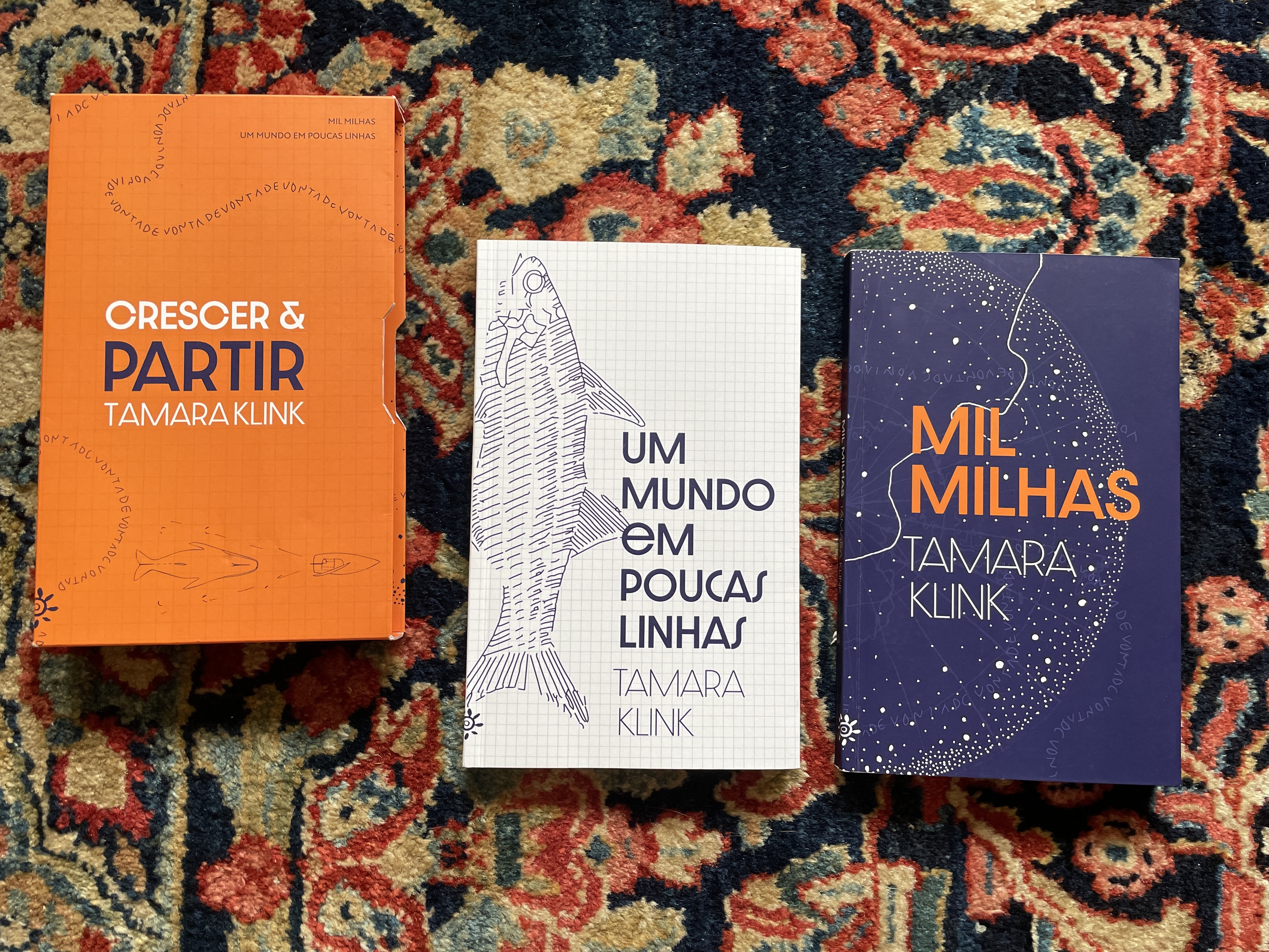
"Crescer e Partir" books, by Tamara Klink (Editora Peirópolis)

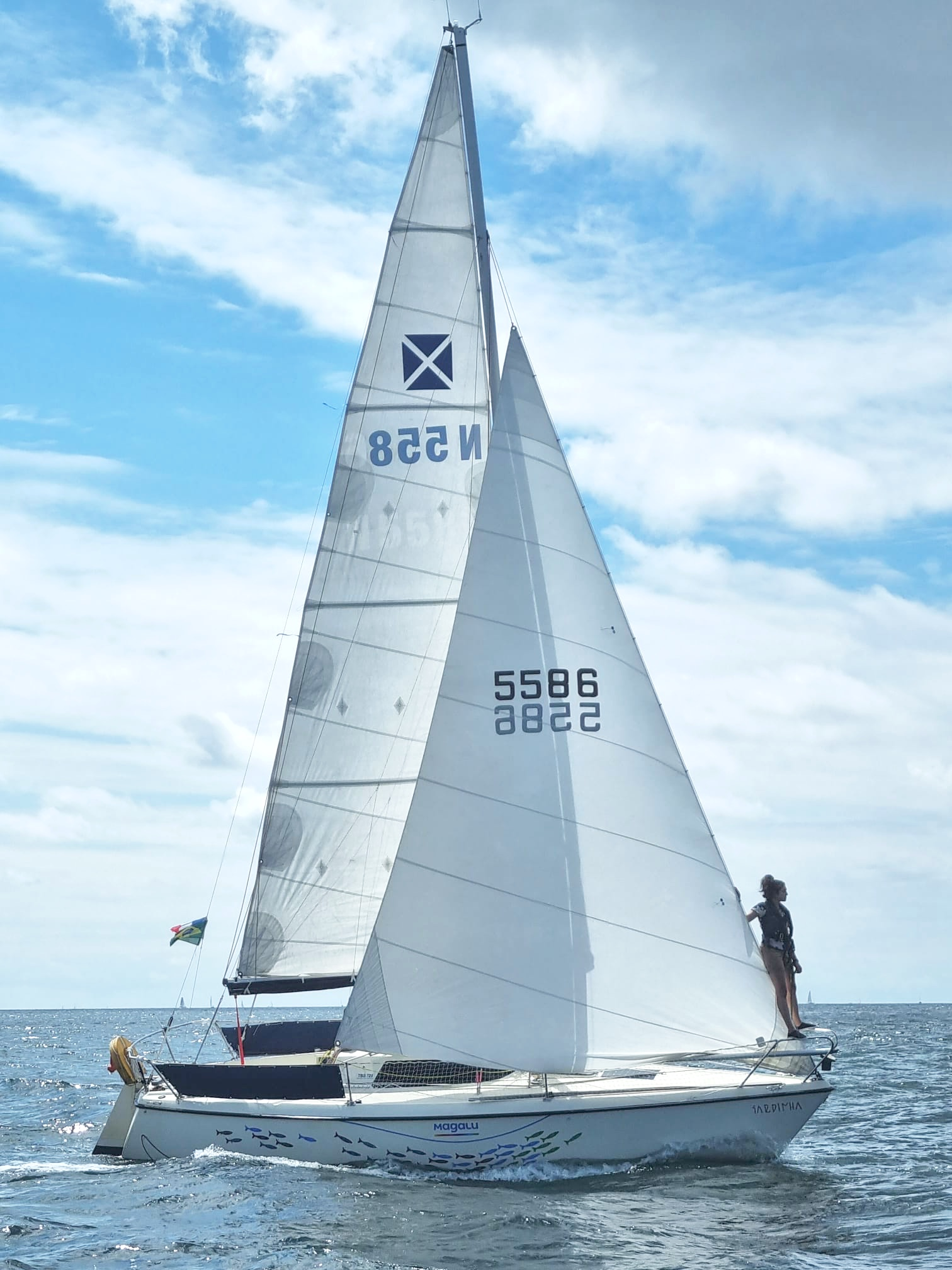
Sardinha Sailboat, Tamara Klink, Maxi Magic, Pelle Peterson

Tamara Klink is a Brazilian sailor and writer. She is the first woman on record to overwinter alone in the Arctic. At 28, she is the youngest woman and the first person from Latin America to sail the Northwest Passage solo. At the age of 24, she became the youngest Brazilian to cross the Atlantic Ocean navigating solo.

== Biography ==
Klink parents are Marina Bandeira Klink and Amyr Klink, a photographer and a sailor, respectively. Since her childhood, she had the opportunity to sail with her parents. In 2010, she published the book "Férias na Antártica" (Vacations in Antarctica) with her sisters Laura and Marina Helena. The book is the result of a series of trips to Antarctica made by her family. This book has been included in the curriculum of many Brazilian schools.

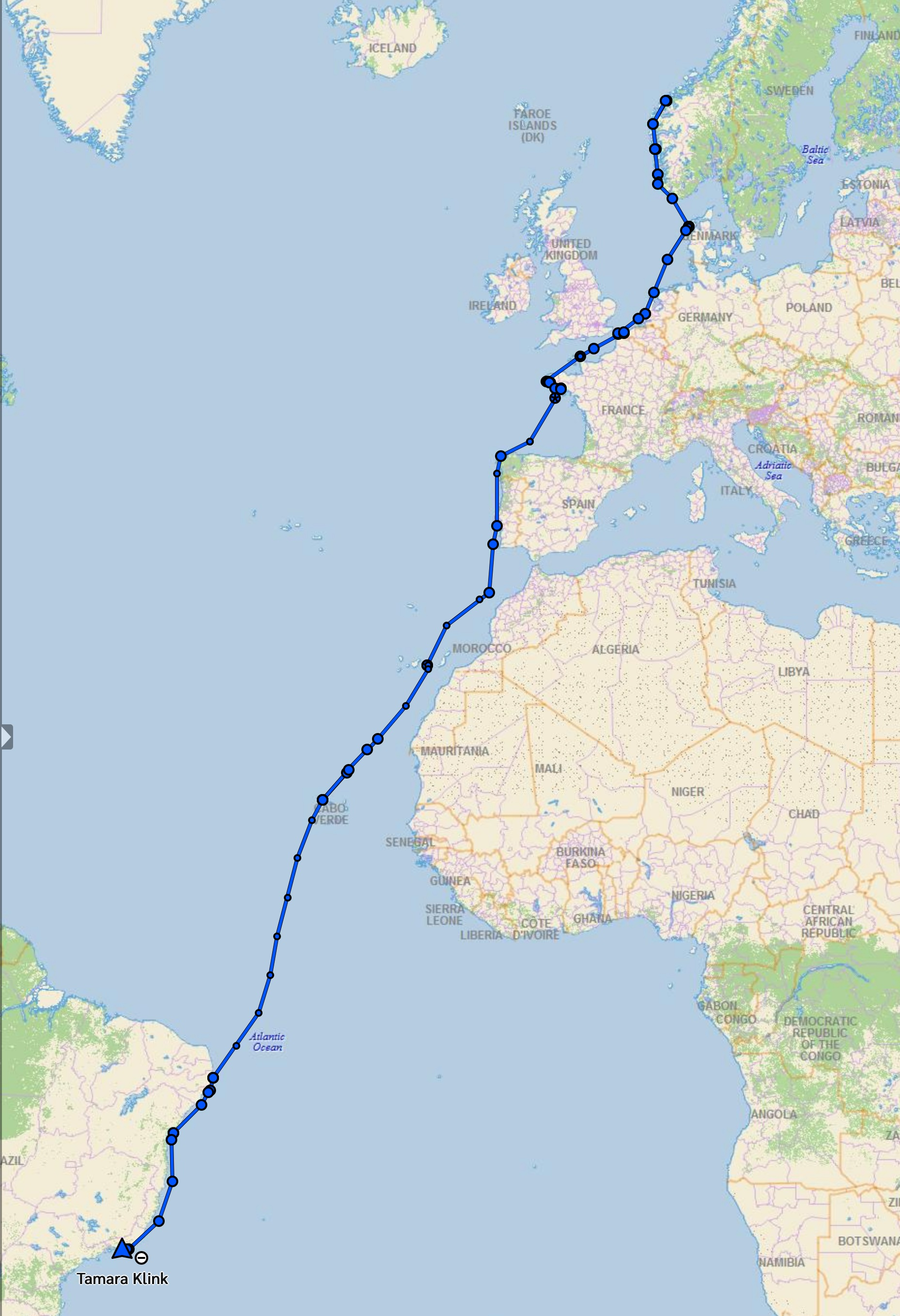
Route navigated by Tamara, from Alesund to Rio de Janeiro

Klink has a master's degree in architecture from the École Supérieure d’Architecture, of Nantes. In 2020, when she was 23 years old, she finished her first solo sailing trip, crossing the North Sea between Ålesund, Norway and Dunkirk, France, on board of the Sardinha sailboat.

Between August and November 2021, she crossed the Atlantic Ocean sailing solo. She departed from France and arrived in Recife, Brazil. With that fact, she became the youngest Brazilian women to cross the Atlantic navigating solo.

Also in 2021, she published two books: "Mil Milhas" and "Um mundo em poucas linhas".

In January and February 2022, Klink made another solo sailing trip with her Sardinha sailboat. This time she navigated from Recife to Paraty, a historical town in the state of Rio de Janeiro.

In July 2023, Klink published "Nós: O Atlântico em Solitário", a book recounting her solo Atlantic crossing in 2021. Shortly after, she embarked on another expedition, this time sailing solo from the western coast of France to the west coast of Greenland, where she wintered alone, the first female sailor to spend winter solo in the Arctic.

In September 2025, Klink completed the Northwest Passage on board the 34-foot Sardinha 2 sailing boat. She sailed alone during 45 days from Greenland to Alaska and became the second woman in history to succeed this solo navigation route.

== Books ==
- Férias na Antártica (ISBN 85-7596-360-0)
- Mil Milhas (ISBN 65-5931-108-2)
- Um mundo em poucas linhas (ISBN 65-5931-107-4)
- Nós: O Atlântico em solitário (ISBN 65-5921-516-4)
