= Tamara Klink (chess player) =

German chess player (born 1967)

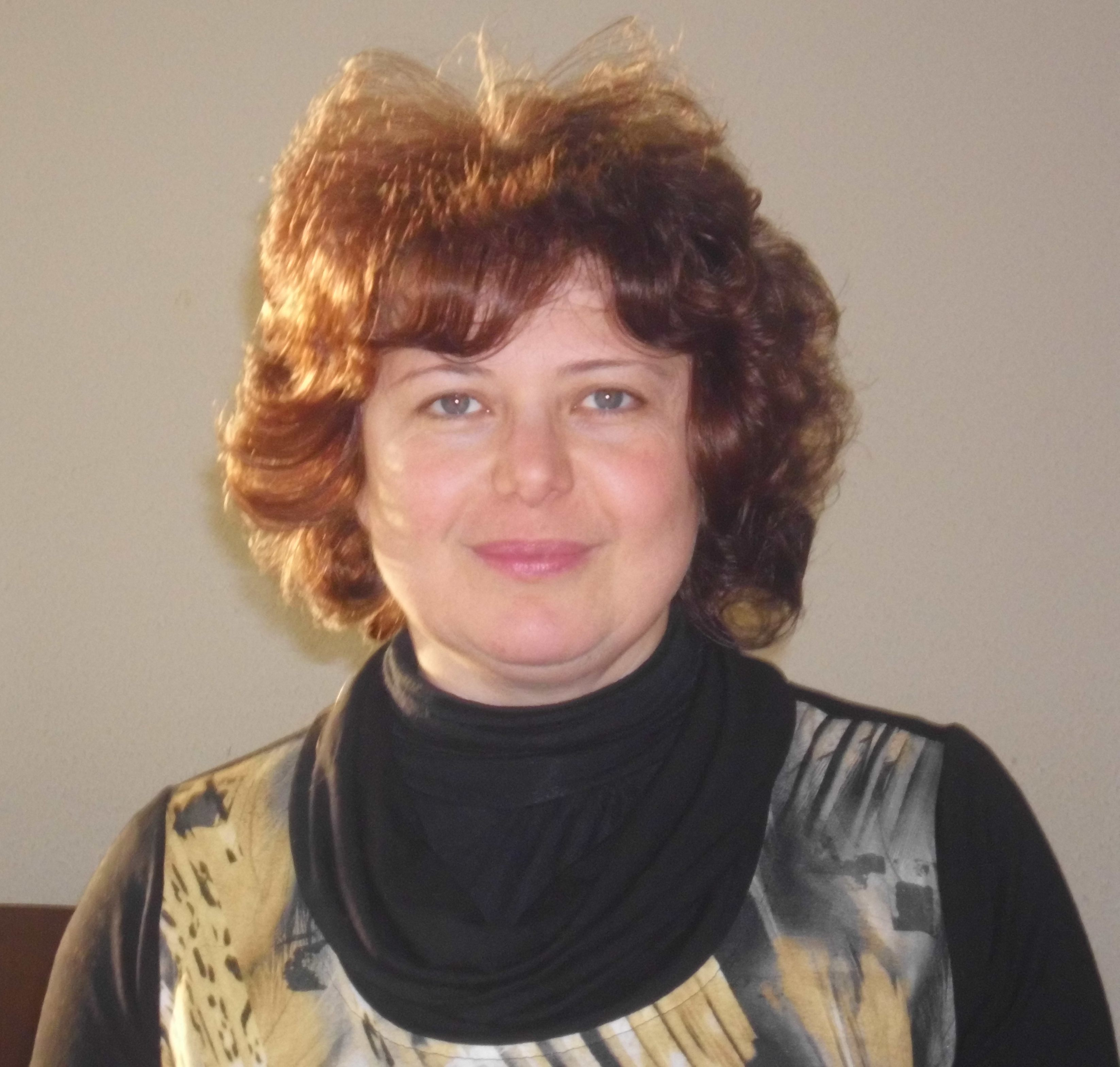
- Klink in 2015

Personal information
- Born: 27 April 1967 (age 59) Shymkent, Kazakhstan

Chess career
- Country: Soviet Union; Russia; Kazakhstan; Germany
- Title: Woman Grandmaster (2000)
- FIDE rating: 2308 (February 2016)
- Peak rating: 2340 (October 2000)

Tamara Klink (née Kogan, also Girkiyan-Klink, born 27 April 1967) is a German chess player who holds the FIDE title of Woman Grandmaster (WGM, 2000). She previously played for the Soviet Union (until 1991), Russia (1992–1993), and Kazakhstan (1993–2001).

== Biography ==
In 1988, Tamara Klink participated in USSR Women's Chess Championship final and ranked in 13th place. In 1991, in Leningrad she ranked 7th in FIDE Zonal chess tournament. After dissolution of the Soviet Union Klink played for Russia and Kazakhstan.

Klink played for Kazakhstan in the Women's Chess Olympiads:

- In 1994, at first reserve board in the 31st Chess Olympiad (women) in Moscow (+5, =2, -2),
- In 1996, at third board in the 32nd Chess Olympiad (women) in Yerevan (+4, =4, -3),
- In 1998, at first board in the 33rd Chess Olympiad (women) in Elista (+4, =7, -2),
- In 2000, at second board in the 34th Chess Olympiad (women) in Istanbul (+5, =3, -5).

Since 2000, Klink lives in Germany, and since 2001, she represents this country in chess tournaments. She was medalist of international chess tournaments in Kassel in 2000, in which she shared the 3rd-10th place, and in Baunatal in 2000, in which she shared the 2nd-3rd place. With OSG chess club Baden-Baden Tamara Klink multiple times won Chess Women's Bundesliga (2003, 2004, 2005, 2008, 2011, 2012). In 2002, with this club, she participated in the European Women's Chess Club Cup.

In 1995, she received the FIDE Woman International Master (WIM) title and received the FIDE Woman Grandmaster (WGM) title five years later.
