= Femke Hiemstra =

Dutch painter (born 1974)

Femke Hiemstra (pronounced [ˈfɛmkə ˈɦimstraː]; born 1974 in Zaandam) is a Dutch painter.

== Work ==
Hiemstra started as a freelance illustrator for 10 years until her paintings became too elaborate for commissions and she transitioned into working primarily in fine art. Her work is usually categorized as pop surrealist or American lowbrow art, but she has said that the most accurate label for her work is "Neo-Fabulism" due to the anthropomorphic (see Anthropomorphism), and narrative-based subject matter. Despite her underground style, Hiemstra has been met with a dedicated fan base; most of her shows selling out within minutes of their announcement. Her mixed media works are made with delicate layers of acrylic paint and color pencil on the surfaces of old books or other bric-a-brac objects. The themes are often mixtures of animals and comic characters, dark surreal settings and stylized typography.

- Carnival, or the Story of a Sad Hungry Bunny. Antwerp, Bries, 2005
- Rock Candy. With an overview of her work, Fantagraphics Books, 2009, ISBN 978-1-60699-149-7.

== Education ==
- 1990-1994: Grafisch Lyceum, Amsterdam
- 1994-1997: School of Arts, Utrecht
