= Femke Huijzer =

Dutch model (born 1999)

Femke Huijzer (pronounced [ˈfɛmkə ˈɦœyzər]; born 22 May 1999) is a Dutch female fashion model.

== Fashion ==
Huijzer is from Sassenheim in the Netherlands. She was scouted in high school but waited before sending photos to Micha Models to become a model. One of her favorite designers is Coco Chanel.

She made a major debut in 2017 as she opened the Dior Spring couture show. Huijzer has walked fashion shows for Chanel, Dior, JW Anderson, Dolce & Gabbana, Boss, Prada, Alexander McQueen, Stella McCartney, Valentino, Victoria Beckham, Saint Laurent and many other brands. She has also been featured in the campaigns of several fashion brands.

Huijzer's mother agency is Micha Models, located in Amsterdam. She is also represented by Women Management, Select model management, View Management, Scoop Models, Modelwerk, and Munich Models.
