= Levi Benima =

Dutch chess player (1838–1922)

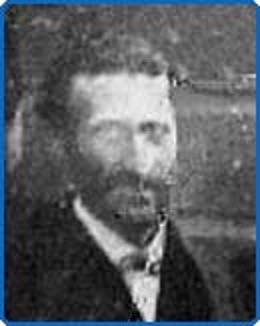

Personal information
- Born: May 11, 1838 Nieuweschans, Netherlands
- Died: February 3, 1922 (aged 83) Amsterdam, Netherlands

Chess career
- Country: Netherlands
- Title: Chess master
- Years active: 1878–1898

Levi Benima (11 May 1838, Nieuweschans – 3 February 1922, Amsterdam) was a Dutch chess master who twice won the Dutch Championship, in 1881 in The Hague and in 1883 in Rotterdam.

In other tournaments, he took 2nd at The Hague 1878 (A. Polak Daniels won), tied for 3rd-4th at Gouda 1880 (Henry Edward Bird won), took 3rd at The Hague 1882 (Christiaan Messemaker won), took 3rd at Gouda 1884 (Christiaan Messemaker won), took 3rd at The Hague 1885 (Dirk van Foreest won), shared 2nd at Utrecht 1886 (D. van Foreest won), took 5th at Rotterdam 1888 (Rudolf Loman won), tied for 4-5th at Groningen 1893 (Arnold van Foreest won), tied for 3rd-4th at Rotterdam 1894 (Loman won), took 3rd at Groningen 1896 (A. van Foreest won), and took 11th at The Hague 1898 (Jan Diderik Tresling won).

Benima was a peddler by profession when he married Meike Engers in 1866 in Winschoten. In 1874 he joined or perhaps co-founded the local chess club "Van der Linde", one of the three oldest extant chess clubs in the Netherlands. He was the only Dutchman to have a positive record against Dirk van Foreest in the latter's heyday in the 1880s (+3−2=2). His son Fred Benima (born 14 March 1876 in Winschoten) became an international tournament player as well.

== Benima Defence ==
A line in the Scotch Gambit (1.e4 e5 2.Nf3 Nc6 3.d4 exd4 4.Bc4 Be7) named after Levi Benima (although played by Johann Löwenthal in 1856) that has an affinity with the Hungarian Defense (i.e. equally reached by 1.e4 e5 2.Nf3 Nc6 3.Bc4 Be7 3.d4 exd4).
