= Jan Willem te Kolsté =

Dutch chess player (1874–1936)

Jan Willem te Kolsté (11 September 1874, in Utrecht – 31 January 1936, in The Hague) was a Dutch chess master.

Te Kolsté participated many times in unofficial and official Dutch championships, and won at Utrecht 1907. He also took 4th at Utrecht 1897 (Rudolf Loman won), tied for 5-6th at The Hague 1898 (Jan Diderik Tresling won), took 14th at Amsterdam 1899 (Henry Ernest Atkins won), took 10th at Haarlem 1901 (Adolf Georg Olland won), took 2nd behind Arnold van Foreest at Rotterdam 1902, tied for 7-9th at Hilversum 1903 (Paul Saladin Leonhardt won), tied for 9-10th at Scheveningen 1905 (Frank James Marshall won), took 3rd at Haarlem 1908 (Johannes Esser won), shared 3rd at Delft 1912 (Loman won), took 4th at The Hague 1919 (Max Marchand won), and took 5th at Nijmegen 1921 (Max Euwe won).

In other tournaments, he won at The Hague 1904, tied for 2nd-3rd at Amsterdam 1907, tied for 6-7th at Scheveningen 1913, shared 1st at The Hague 1917 and s' Hertogenbosch 1918, won at The Hague 1922, shared 1st at Amsterdam 1927, but came a distant last at Baden-Baden 1925 (Alexander Alekhine won).

He played for The Netherlands in 1st Chess Olympiad at London 1927.

== See also ==
- Dutch Chess Championship
