= Dirk Bleijkmans =

Dutch chess player (1875–1944)

Jan Dirk Bleijkmans (Bleykmans) (16 May 1875 – 27 December 1944) was a Dutch chess master.

Bleijkmans was born in Amsterdam as the son of Karel Bleijkmans and Johanna Sophia van Wulften. He twice won unofficial Dutch championship (The Netherland Chess Federation Tourney) at Leiden 1896 and Leeuwarden 1904. He also tied for 2nd-5th, behind Adolf Georg Olland, at Arnhem 1895, took 2nd, behind Arnold van Foreest, at Groningen 1896, shared 2nd, behind Rudolf Loman, at Utrecht 1897. He lost a match to Norman van Lennep (0–3) at Amsterdam 1897, shared 3rd at Amsterdam 1897, tied for 7-8th at The Hague 1898, and took 7th at Haarlem 1901.

He participated in several international tournaments; took 6th at Berlin 1897 (Ignatz von Popiel won), shared 5th at Cologne 1898 (the 11th DSB Congress, Hauptturnier B, Salomon Löwenthal won), tied for 3rd-6th at Amsterdam 1899 (Henry Ernest Atkins won), shared 3rd at Munich 1900 (the 12th DSB Congress, Hauptturnier B, Section I), tied for 16-19th at Hanover 1902 (the 13th DSB Congress, Hauptturnier A, Walter John won), took 11th at Scheveningen 1905 (Frank James Marshall won), and took 6th at Barmen 1905 (Hauptturnier A, Akiba Rubinstein and Oldřich Duras won). Finally, he took 8th at Leiden 1909 (the 1st official Dutch Chess Championship won by Olland).

Bleijkmans was an author of Handleiding voor het schaakspel (1917).

He was the champion of the island Java (now Jawa, Indonesia), and played Alexander Alekhine in a simultaneous game in Batavia (now Jakarta) in 1933.
