= Bernard Wolff =

Bernard Wolff may refer to:

- Bernhard Wolff (1811–1879), German media mogul
- Bernard Pierre Wolff (1930–1985), French-born American photographer

== See also ==
- Bernard de Wolff (born 1955, Dutch painter
- Bernard Wolff Beffie (1872–1943), Dutch dermatologist and chess player
