= Norman van Lennep =

Dutch chess player

Norman Willem van Lennep (20 September 1872 – 29 September 1897) was a Dutch chess master. He served as the secretary of the Dutch Chess Federation and an editor of its magazine. He killed himself by jumping into the North Sea from a ship at the age of 25.

== Career ==
Born into a wealthy family in Amsterdam, grandson of the famous Dutch writer Jacob van Lennep, at age 20 became a secretary of the Dutch Chess Federation and an editor of its magazine. In 1893 he drew two matches with Rudolf Loman (+2 –2 =0 and +1 –1 =1) and won a match against his grandnephew Arnold van Foreest (+3 –0 =2). He won at Leipzig 1894 (the 9th DSB Congress, Hauptturnier A) and took 5th at Rotterdam 1894 (Rudolf Loman won).

In August 1895 Van Lennep went to England as a reserve entrant in the Hastings 1895 chess tournament, but was not allowed to play, so instead reported on the tournament for his magazine. It was then announced that he had decided to stay; from his letters it appears his father had disowned him unless he ceased his involvement in chess and found a steady job and a wife.

== Suicide ==
He returned to the Netherlands, won at Amsterdam 1897 followed by Jan Diderik Tresling, D. Bleijkmans and A. van Foreest, and killed himself, jumping into the North Sea from a ship at the age of 25.
