= Ingrid Tuk =

Dutch chess player

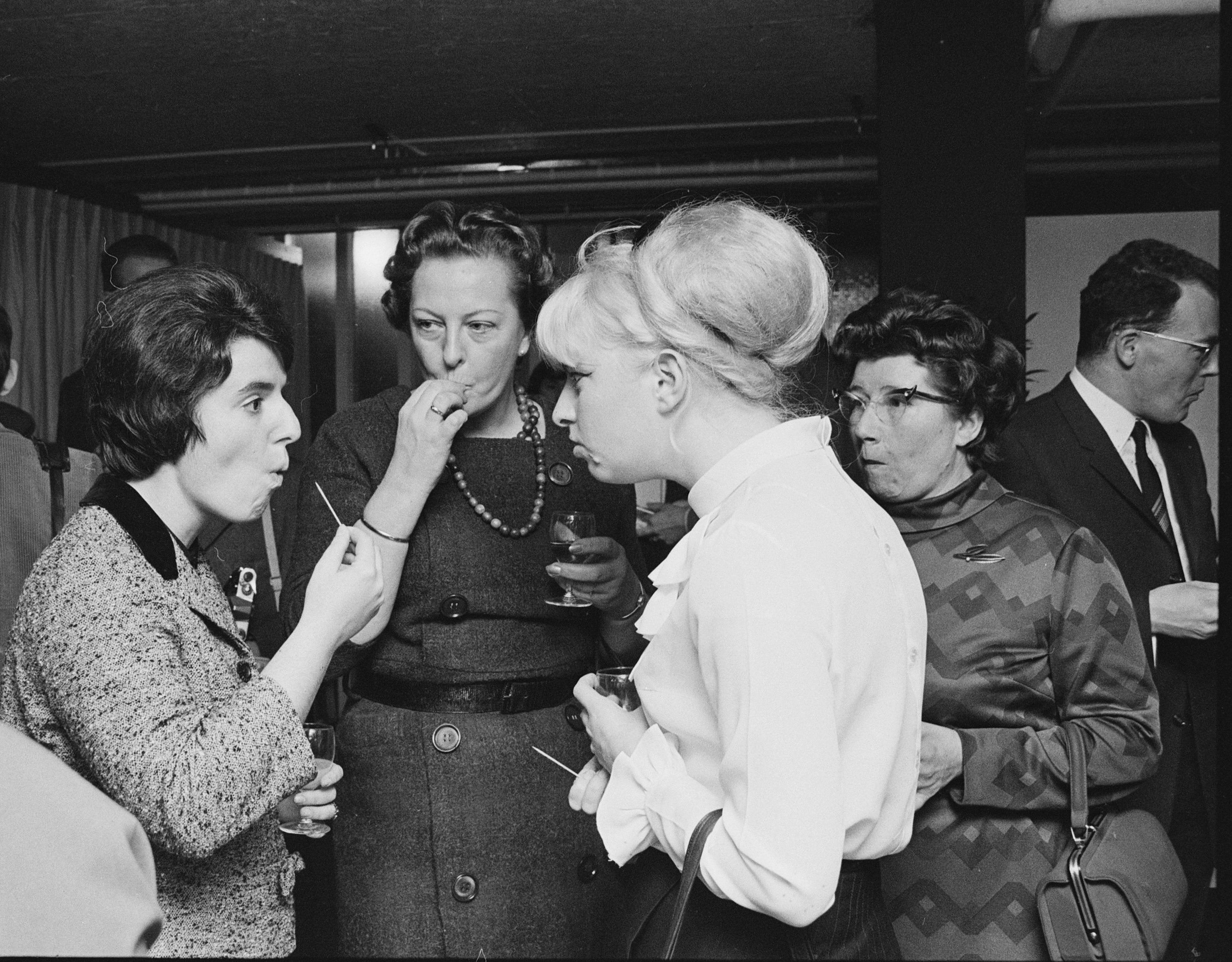
- Left to right: Nona Gaprindashvili, Corry Vreeken, Ingrid Tuk, Fenny Heemskerk (1969)

Personal information
- Born: March 1945 Rotterdam
- Died: 17 December 2025 Steenwijk

Chess career
- Country: Netherlands

Ingrid Tuk (1945–2025, also known as Ineke Tuk, Ingrid Tuk-Jansen and Ingrid Jansen) was a Dutch chess player. She won the Dutch Chess Championship for women in 1968 after Corry Vreeken won three consecutive championships in 1962, 1964 and 1966.

After this success, Jansen wasn't heard of for several years until a Dutch journalist, Max Pam, at the end of the seventies, was asked to provide interviews with two female chess players, one of whom was Ingrid Tuk. He ended up finding her in a strip club in Amsterdam—under her own name (Ingrid Jansen)—and actually paid her rate of 102 Dutch guilders (at the time around $35) for an interview. During the interview Jansen told Pam that she had stopped playing chess because of the rivalry between the female chess champions. She now made better money, and she wasn't ashamed of what she did for a living. Jansen married three times - one time to Bojan Kurajica.

It wasn't until 2008 that Jansen returned as a chess player at a local chess club in Steenwijk. She also played with the Dutch provincial Frisian Chess Union (Friese Schaakbond) en participated in the 2010 Frisian Chess Championships. Jansen died in Steenwijk in December 2025.
