= Machteld van Foreest =

Dutch chess player (born 2007)

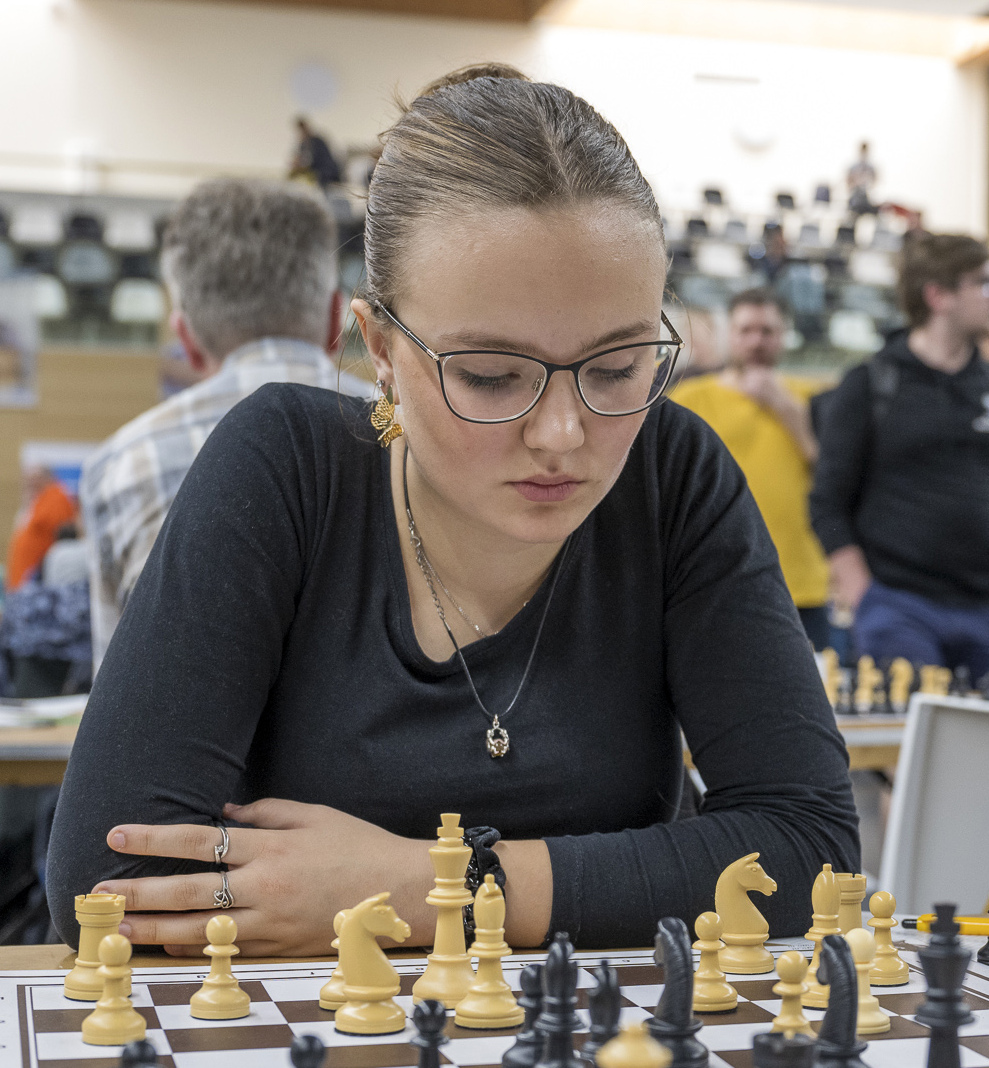
- Machteld van Foreest in 2024

Personal information
- Born: 22 August 2007 (age 19) Groningen, Netherlands

Chess career
- Country: Netherlands
- Title: FIDE Master (2022); Woman Grandmaster (2025)
- FIDE rating: 2328 (December 2025)
- Peak rating: 2367 (February 2025)

Jkvr. Machteld van Foreest (born 22 August 2007) is a Dutch chess player. She is a three-time Dutch women's national champion. Van Foreest has won several Dutch Youth Championships, including the open under-12 division in 2017 and 2018, the open under-14 division in 2018, and the girls' under-10 division in 2014 at age six. She finished in joint third place and fifth overall in the girls' under-12 division at the 2019 World Cadets Chess Championship. Van Foreest has a peak FIDE rating of 2367.

Van Foreest grew up in a chess family in which her father taught her and all five of her brothers to play chess. Her two oldest brothers Jorden and Lucas both hold the title of Grandmaster (GM), and her twin brother Nanne also plays competitively. Van Foreest's great-great-grandfather Arnold was a three-time Dutch chess champion, as was Arnold's brother Dirk. Van Foreest began playing chess at age four. She was the highest-rated girl age 12 or under in 2018. In 2022, she became the youngest ever Dutch Women's Champion at age 15 after beating Anne Haast for the title. In 2025, she won the Dutch Championship again, defeating Robin Duson in the final, and retained her title in 2026.
