= Eddie Scholl =

Dutch chess player (born 1944)

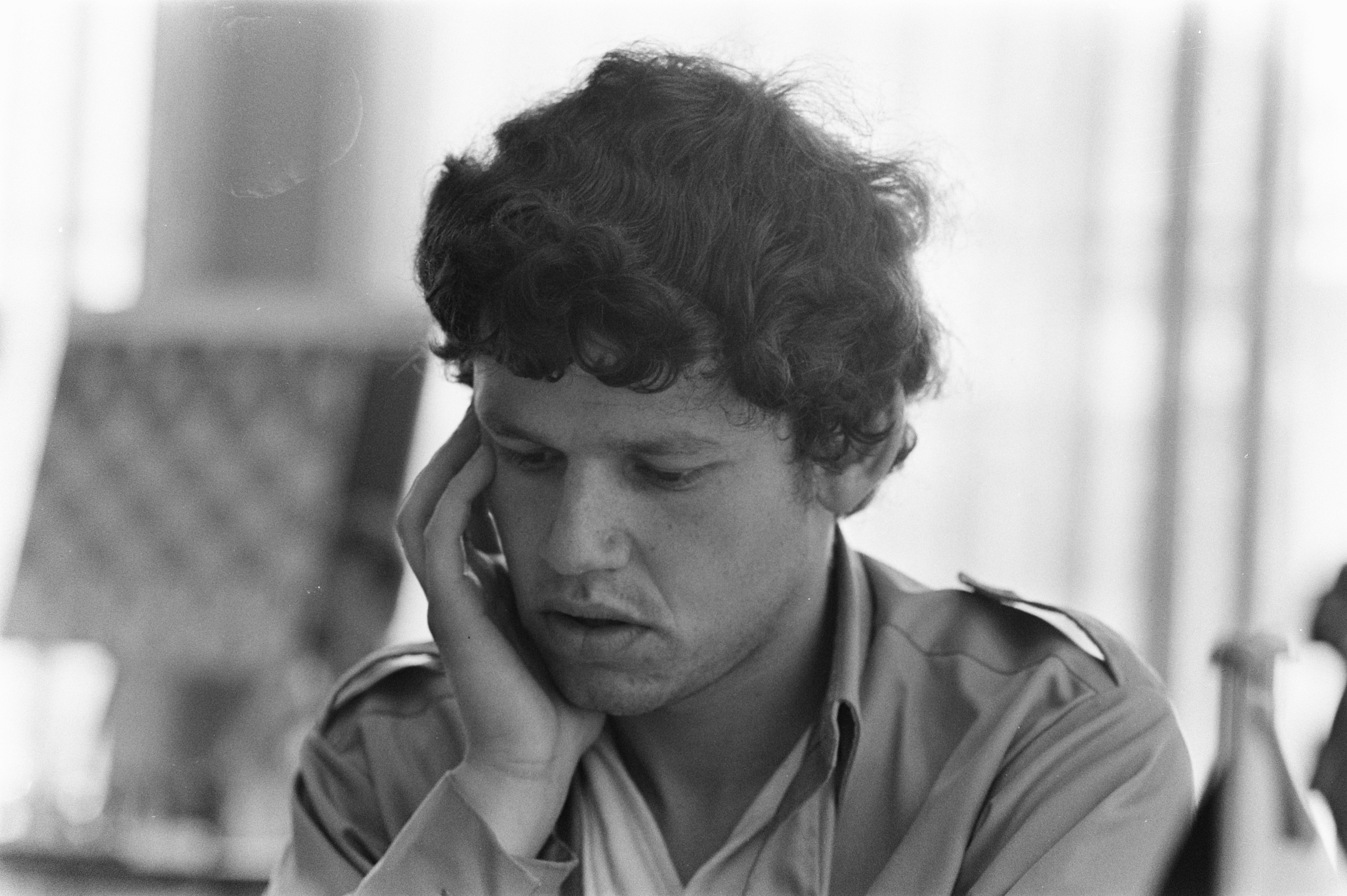
- Eddie Scholl in 1970

Personal information
- Born: 17 October 1944 (age 82) Leeuwarden, Friesland, Netherlands

Chess career
- Country: Netherlands
- Peak rating: 2430 (July 1971)

Eduard Cornelis (Eddie) Scholl (born 17 October 1944) is a Dutch chess player, Dutch Chess Championship winner (1970).

== Chess career ==
In 1963, Eddie Scholl represented the Netherlands at the World Junior Chess Championship held in Vrnjačka Banja. In 1966, he shared the 1st place (together with Jens Enevoldsen and Theodor Ghițescu) in the round-robin IBM international chess tournament–B in Amsterdam. He soon rose to the top of Dutch chess players. In Dutch Chess Championships he won individual medals three times: a gold medal (1970) and two bronze medals (1967, 1971). In 1971, he played in the international match between the Netherlands and Federal Republic of Germany, defeating Rudolf Teschner with the score 1½:½.

Eddie Scholl played for Netherlands in the Chess Olympiad:

- In 1970, at first board in the 19th Chess Olympiad in Siegen (+6, =9, -2).

Eddie Scholl played for Netherlands in the World Student Team Chess Championship:

- In 1966, at fourth board in the 13th World Student Team Chess Championship in Örebro (+2, =4, -4).

Eddie Scholl played for Netherlands in the Clare Benedict Chess Cup:

- In 1971, at first board in the 18th Clare Benedict Chess Cup in Madrid (+2, =2, -1) and won team and individual gold medals.

Eddie Scholl played for Netherlands in the European Team Chess Championship preliminaries:

- In 1970, at seventh board in the 4th European Team Chess Championship preliminaries (+0, =2, -1),
- In 1973, at sixth board in the 5th European Team Chess Championship preliminaries (+0, =1, -1).

He achieved the highest rating in his career on July 1, 1971, with a score of 2430 points, sharing 3rd place at that time (behind Jan Hein Donner and Jan Timman, together with Hans Bouwmeester, Hans Ree and Coen Zuidema) among Dutch chess players.

== Other ==
Until June 2007 Eddie Scholl was a mathematics teacher at the Stedelijk Gymnasium Leeuwarden.
