= De Lelie =

De Lelie is a Dutch surname. Notable people with the surname include:

- Adriaan de Lelie (1755–1820), Dutch painter
- Adrianus de Lelie (1827–1899), Dutch chess player
- Steven De Lelie (born 1977), Belgian actor and theatre director
