= Devotion (Piet Mondrian) =

Painting by Piet Mondrian

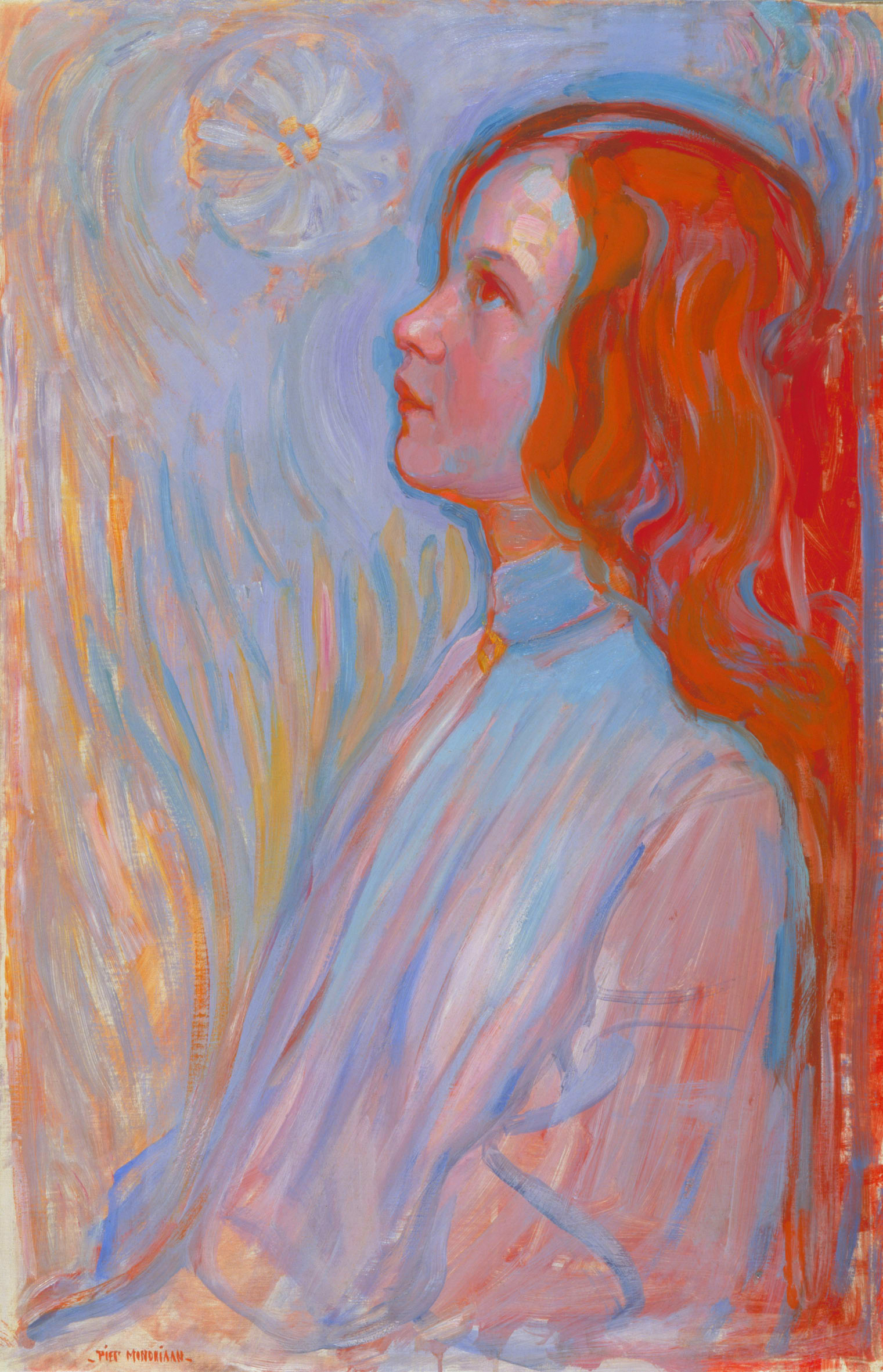
- Artist: Piet Mondrian
- Year: 1908
- Medium: oil paint, canvas
- Dimensions: 94 cm (37 in) × 61 cm (24 in)
- Location: Kunstmuseum Den Haag

Devotion is a painting by the Dutch artist Piet Mondrian in the Kunstmuseum Den Haag.

== Summary ==
The picture shows a girl sitting in a chair, and looking above at a flower. The identity of the girl is unknown.

The colourful nature of the painting was unusual for Mondrian's earlier paintings. During the 1908 St Lucas exhibition, Mondrian was impressed by the luminist style of Jan Toorop, and Mondrian began to incoprate Toorop's style. By the time of the 1909 exhibition in the Stedelijk Museum in Amsterdam (a three man exhibition with the work of Kees Spoor en Jan Sluijters) Mondrian's incorporation of Toorop's approach.

== Provenance ==
The work was from 1912 to 1946 under the ownership of Johannes Esser in Amsterdam. From 1946, in the collection of Sal Slijper in Den Haag. It had been on show at the Kunstmuseum in Den Haag (then called the Gemeentemuseum) since 1951. In 1971, it would be part of the whole collection that Slijper donated to the museum.
