= Charles Dupré =

Dutch chess player

Personal information
- Born: 7 June 1827 Rotterdam, South Holland, Netherlands
- Died: 11 June 1907 (aged 80) Delft, South Holland, Netherlands

Chess career
- Country: Netherlands

Charles Eliza Adrien Dupré (7 June 1827 – 11 June 1907), better known as C.E.A. Dupré, was an administrative assistant by profession, possible forwarder, and one of the strongest players in the Dutch chess in the 19th century, unofficial Dutch Chess Championship winner (1879).

== Chess career ==
In the period from 1860 to 1865, Dupré probably spent all his time with, among others, Gustav Dufresne and Serafino Dubois playing chess at the Rotterdam club Vermaak door Oefening (1821–1876).

Best performance

- 1875: 2nd Prize of the unofficial Dutch Chess Championship.
- 1879: 1st Prize of the unofficial Dutch Chess Championship. Dupré was Dutch champion that year. Dupré's highest historical chess rating is 2270 and dates from his late years.

== Contribute to the development of chess ==
As a chess player, Dupré was involved in the development of chess in the Netherlands. He regularly shared copy with Willem Verbeek, who published it in the chess magazine Sissa. He discussed ideas for chess with Verbeek.

In addition to serving for years as secretary for Entertainment through Exercise, he has made efforts to set up a regional association.

When the Royal Dutch Chess Federation was founded in 1873, he became president/treasury secretary of the Rotterdam department.
