= Bruinenberg =

Bruinenberg is a Dutch surname. Notable people with the surname include:

- Carla Bruinenberg (born 1944), Dutch chess master
- Dirk Bruinenberg (born 1968), Dutch musician
- Dominique Bruinenberg (born 1993), Dutch football midfielder
