= Julius de Vogel =

Dutch chess player

Personal information
- Born: 23 March 1828 Jepara, Dutch East Indies
- Died: 26 June 1915 (aged 87) Dutch East Indies

Chess career
- Country: Netherlands

Julius Gerard Charles Adelin de Vogel (23 March 1828 – 26 June 1915) was a Dutch chess player, unofficial Dutch Chess Championship winner (1876).

== Chess career ==
Julius de Vogel born in the city of Jepara on the island of Java. In his youth he moved to the Netherlands, where he lived until 1888, after which he returned to the Dutch East Indies.

In 1873, in Hague he participated in the first Dutch unofficial chess championship in The Hague, where he won 5,5 points out of 9 possible (+4, =3, -2). In 1876, in Gouda he won the fourth Dutch unofficial chess championship.

In 1876—1888 Julius de Vogel served as President of the Royal Dutch Chess Federation.
