= Anne Marie Benschop =

Dutch chess player (born 1969)

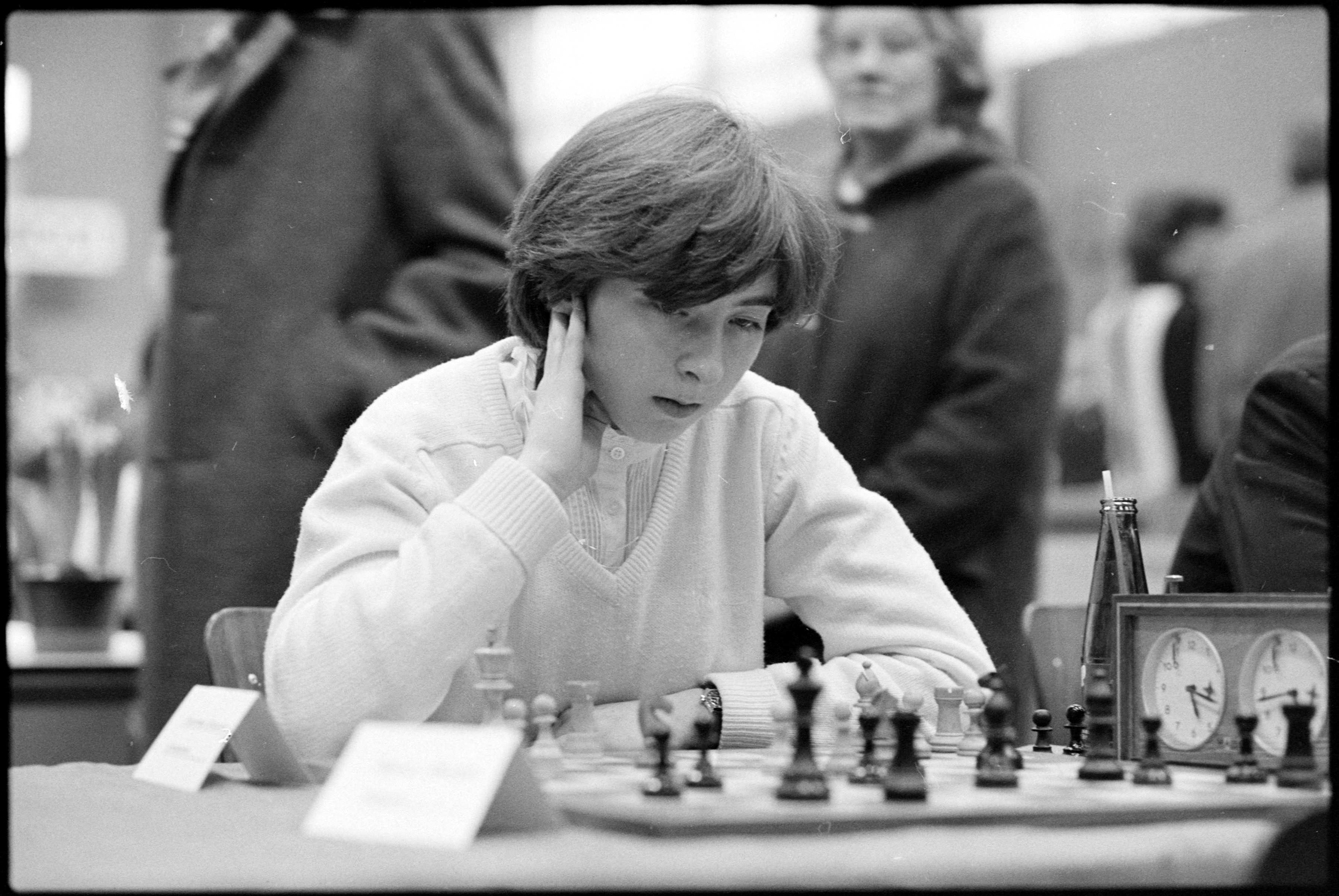
- Anne Marie Benschop in 1984

Personal information
- Born: 11 August 1969 (age 56)

Chess career
- Country: Netherlands
- Title: Woman International Master (1990)
- Peak rating: 2210 (January 1995)

Anne Marie Benschop (born 11 August 1969) is a Dutch chess Woman International Master (1990), Dutch Women's Chess Championships winner (1991).

== Chess career ==
In 1988, in Adelaide Benschop represented the Netherlands at the World Junior Chess Championship and ranked in 18th place, while in 1989, in Straszęcin she shared 7th-11th place in the European Junior Chess Championship. Anne Marie Benschop soon rose to the top of Dutch female chess players. In 1991, she won the Dutch Women's Chess Championship, she was also the silver (1990) and bronze (1989) medalist of the Dutch Women's Chess Championships.

In 1990, Benschop shared 2nd place (after Gina Finegold, together with Martine Dubois and Céline Roos) in the international chess tournament in Oisterwijk, while in 1991 (also in Oisterwijk) she achieved great success, winning the West European Zonal chess tournament (elimination of the Women's World Chess Championship) (however, she did not play in the Interzonal chess tournament in Subotica in 1991).

Benschop played for Netherlands in the Women's Chess Olympiads:

- In 1990, at first board in the 29th Chess Olympiad (women) in Novi Sad (+5, =2, -5),
- In 1992, at second board in the 30th Chess Olympiad (women) in Manila (+5, =2, -4),
- In 1994, at second board in the 31st Chess Olympiad (women) in Moscow (+1, =4, -5),
- In 1996, at third board in the 32nd Chess Olympiad (women) in Yerevan (+5, =3, -3).

Benschop played for Netherlands in the European Women's Team Chess Championship:

- In 1997, at first reserve board in the 2nd European Team Chess Championship (women) in Pula (+2, =1, -2).

Benschop achieved the highest rating in her career on 1 January 1995, with a score of 2210 points, she was then ranked 2nd (behind Erika Sziva) among Dutch female chess players. Since 1999, she has played very rarely in tournaments classified by FIDE.
