= Lucas van Foreest =

Dutch chess grandmaster (born 2001)

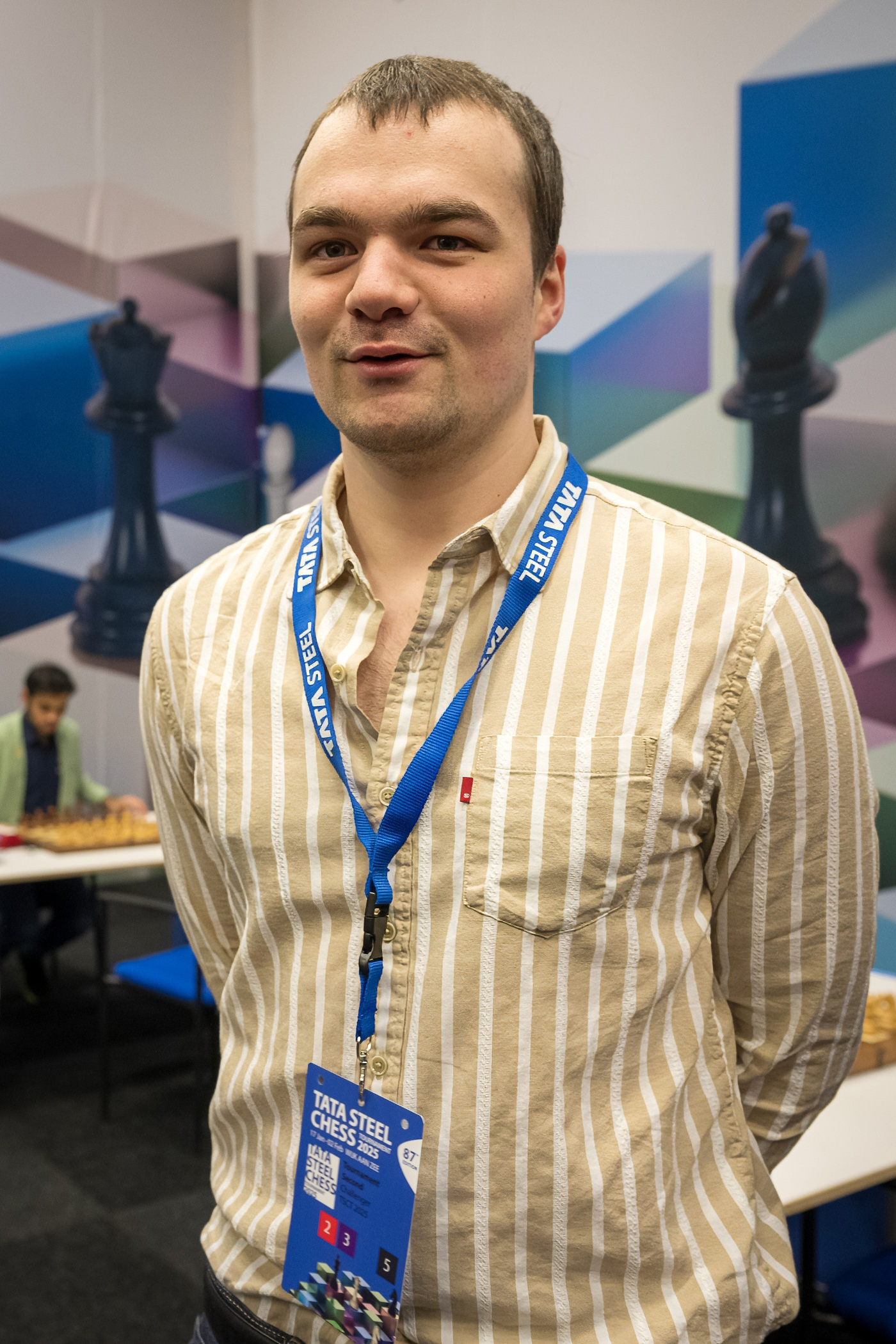
- Van Foreest in 2025

Personal information
- Born: 3 March 2001 (age 25) Hengelo, Netherlands
- Relatives: Jorden van Foreest (brother); Machteld van Foreest (sister)
- Family: Van Foreest

Chess career
- Country: Netherlands
- Title: Grandmaster (2018)
- FIDE rating: 2554 (October 2026)
- Peak rating: 2589 (August 2022)

Jhr. Lucas van Foreest (born 3 March 2001) is a Dutch chess grandmaster. He won the Dutch Chess Championship in 2019.

Van Foreest earned the International Master title in 2016 and was awarded the Grandmaster title in 2018, at age 17. A member of the Van Foreest family, his brother Jorden won the Dutch Chess Championship in 2016, and both his great-great grandfather Arnold and great-great granduncle Dirk were three-time Dutch Champions.

== Chess career ==
Van Foreest started playing chess aged "around six, seven".

He achieved his first International Master (IM) norm at the Dutch Team Competition, from September to October 2015. He scored 7/9, which was enough for both the IM norm and Grandmaster (GM) norm. He achieved his second IM norm at the Amsterdam Chess Tournament in July 2016, and his third IM norm at the Hoogeveen Open in October 2016.

In January 2017, he won the top amateur group at the Tata Steel Chess Tournament, thus qualifying for the Tata Steel Challengers in 2018. He achieved his second GM norm at the 9th Batavia Chess Tournament in March 2017. He shared first with Bobby Cheng on 6½/9 (+6–2=1), finishing second on tiebreak. He won the Bruges Masters in August 2017.

Van Foreest competed in the Tata Steel Challengers in January 2018, placing eleventh with a score 5½/13 (+3–5=5). He competed at the Open Dutch Championship, held from 24 July to 2 August. He shared first with Erwin l'Ami and Erik van den Doel on 7/9, achieving his third GM norm in the process. He was awarded the GM title by FIDE in October 2018.

As of July 2018, Van Foreest is a student of Sergei Tiviakov.

Van Foreest competed in the Tata Steel Challengers again in January 2019, scoring 6/13 (+2–3=8) for a ninth-place finish. In March, he participated in the European Individual Chess Championship. He placed 60th with 6½/11 (+5–3=3) for a performance rating of 2634. In July, Van Foreest won the Dutch Chess Championship. He tied for first with 5/7 (+3–0=4), and defeated his elder brother Jorden on tiebreak to win the title.

== Personal life ==
Born in Hengelo on 3 March 2001, Van Foreest comes from the noble Van Foreest family and has the honorific of jonkheer. He is the great-great grandson of Arnold van Foreest and great-great grandnephew of Dirk van Foreest. Both Arnold and Dirk were three-time Dutch Chess Champions (Arnold: 1889, 1893, 1902; Dirk: 1885, 1886, 1887).

Lucas has four brothers and one sister. His eldest brother, Jorden (born 1999), became the youngest chess grandmaster in Dutch history at the age of 16, and won the Dutch Chess Championship at age 17 in 2016. His sister, Machteld (born 2007), won the Dutch Girls' U10 Championship at the age of 6 and shared second place in the Dutch Girls' U20 Championship when she was 9. In 2017, she became the first girl ever to win the Dutch U12 Championship. In 2022, she won the Dutch Women's Championship.
