= Renate Limbach =

Dutch chess player (1971–2006)

Personal information
- Born: 23 October 1971 Nijmegen, Gelderland, Netherlands
- Died: 6 June 2006 (aged 34)

Chess career
- Country: Netherlands
- Title: Woman International Master (1991)
- Peak rating: 2180 (July 1993)

Renate Limbach (23 October 1971 – 6 June 2006) was a Dutch chess Woman International Master (1991), Dutch Women's Chess Championship winner (1990).

== Chess career ==
Renate Limbach was born in 1971 in Nijmegen and growed up in Apeldoorn. She was one of two daughters of Alida Ignatia Maria van Leeuwen (* 1941) and Antonius “Ton” Limbach (1938–2007); her father was a school superintendent. Ton Limbach taught his daughter to play chess. Since she was an excellent student who found learning easy, she was able to spend a lot of time at the chessboard. At the age of ten she became a member of the Apeldoorns Schaakgenootschap and took part in tournaments. In 1986 she won Dutch Girls' Chess Championship in the U16 age group. Veluws College, which she attended from 1984 to 1990, gave her the opportunity to combine sport and school.

In 1987 and 1989 Renate Limbach won Dutch Girls Rapid Chess Championship. At the World Youth Chess Championship in U16 age group in Innsbruck she came 7th with 6 points from 11 games.

In 1990, at the age of 19, she won the Dutch Women's Chess Championship. In the same year she competed at the World Girls' Junior Chess Championship in Santiago. She scored 6,5 points in 13 games despite being ill. Also in 1990, she was part of the Dutch Junior Chess team for the Faber Cup, a tournament for youth national teams in Arnhem, which the Netherlands won.

Renate Limbach played for Netherlands in the Women's Chess Olympiad:

- In 1990, at third board in the 29th Chess Olympiad (women) in Novi Sad (+3, =1, -4).

At the Dutch Women's Chess Championship in 1991 she was unable to defend her title and came in 4th place.

In 1991, in Mamaia she participated in World Girls' Junior Chess Championship and ranked in 12th place.

Renate Limbach two time participated in Women's World Chess Championship West European Subzonal tournaments:

- in 1991, in Oisterwijk and shared 3rd – 5th place;
- in 1993, in Delden and shared 4th – 7th place.

After graduating from high school, Limbach studied cognitive science at the Catholic University of Nijmegen and continued to play chess, including with the support of the university at the World Girls' Junior Chess Championship in Mamaia in 1991, in which she scored 7 points from 13 games. In Nijmegen she became a member of the Strijdt met Beleid chess association, where she was team captain of the chess team, which was then playing in the first league. She was a trainer for young people who she also looked after at international events. She developed a training structure for chess coaches for the Royal Netherlands Chess Federation (KNSB), represented the interests of women's chess and was active in the youth chess committee.

In 2001, Renate Limbach received her doctorate with a dissertation on the subject of Supporting Instructional Designers, in which she also addressed problems in chess. While working on her dissertation, she was active at SK Turm Emsdetten in Germany. With the women's team of this club she won the Women's Chess Bundesliga in the 2000/01 season.

Renate Limbach had been in a relationship since 2001 but had no children. She was described as a popular woman who was social, committed, enthusiastic and always in a good mood. When it came to chess, however, she was a “real attacker”. She achieved her best Elo rating of 2180 in July 1993.

After completing her doctorate, Limbach became a consultant for education for the People's Party for Freedom and Democracy faction in the House of Representatives. In 2003 she moved to the Ministry of Education, where she was appointed deputy university inspector. Renate Limbach died completely unexpectedly on June 6, 2006, at the age of 34 in her home town of Zoetermeer; the cause of death is not publicly known.

== Honors ==
Because of winning the national women's chess title in 1990, Renate Limbach received the Silver Town Hall Penny from the municipality of Apeldoorn the following year. The World Chess Federation (FIDE) awarded her the title of Women's International Master (WIM) in 1991. The German chess club Turm Emsdetten made her an honorary member posthumously in 2006. From 2006 to 2008, the Stichts-Gooise Schaakbond organized the Renate Limbach Dutch Rapid Chess Championships for women and girls.
