= Jessica Harmsen (chess player) =

Dutch chess player (born 1966)

Personal information
- Born: 5 September 1966 (age 59)

Chess career
- Country: Netherlands
- Title: Woman International Master (1988)
- Peak rating: 2245 (July 1989)

Jessica Harmsen (born 5 September 1966) is a Dutch chess Woman International Master (1988), three-times Dutch Women's Chess Championships winner (1985, 1987, 1988).

== Chess career ==
Harmsen won the Dutch Youth Chess Championships three times: in 1982 in the girls U16 age group, in 1984 and 1985 in the girls U20 age group. In 1984, in Katowice she participated in European Girls' Junior Chess Championship and ranked in 7th place. In 1985, in Dobrna she participated in World Girls' Junior Chess Championship and ranked in 12th place.

In the 1980s and 1990s, Harmsen was among the leading Dutch female chess players. She competed many times in the individual finals of the Dutch Women's Chess Championship and three times won this tournament: 1985 (shared 1st place with Hanneke van Parreren), 1987 and 1988. In addition, in 1989 she won a silver medal and in 2000 - a bronze medal at the Dutch Women's Chess Championships. In 1986, she took 6th place in the international chess tournament in Nałęczów.

Harmsen thrice participated in Women's World Chess Championship West European Subzonal tournaments:

- in 1985, in Amsterdam and ranked in 5th place;
- in 1990, in Oisterwijk and ranked in 9th place;
- in 1991, in Oisterwijk and ranked in 6th place.

Harmsen played for the Netherlands in the Women's Chess Olympiad:

- In 1988, at first board in the 28th Chess Olympiad (women) in Thessaloniki (+5, =2, -4).

Harmsen achieved the highest rating in her career on 1 July 1989, with a score of 2245 points, she was then ranked first among Dutch female chess players. Since 1994, she has played very rarely in tournaments classified by the FIDE.
