= Maaike Keetman =

Dutch chess player (born 1999)

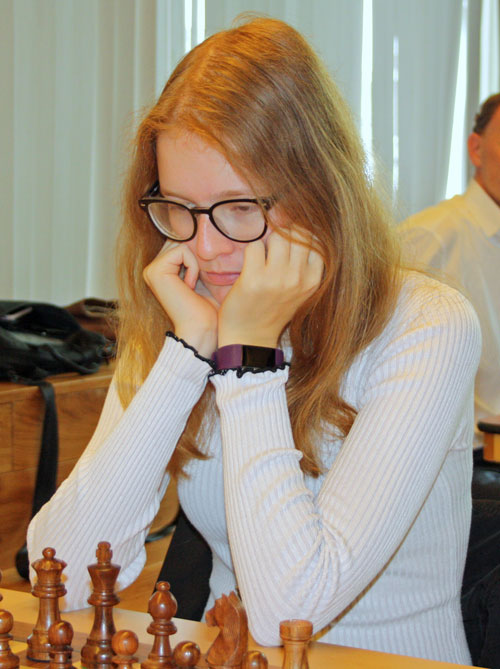
- Keetman in 2017

Personal information
- Born: 18 March 1999 (age 27) Heerhugowaard, Netherlands

Chess career
- Country: Netherlands
- Title: Woman FIDE Master (2020)
- FIDE rating: 2161 (January 2026)
- Peak rating: 2254 (December 2016)

Maaike Keetman (born 18 March 1999) is a Dutch chess player who holds the title of Woman FIDE Master (WFM). Keetman was the Dutch women's national champion in 2024. She represented the Netherlands at the 42nd Chess Olympiad in Baku in 2016, playing on the reserve board. Keetman works for Chessable as vice president of content, and has also authored her own chess opening courses.
