= Heleen Van Arkel-de Greef =

Dutch chess player (born 1965)

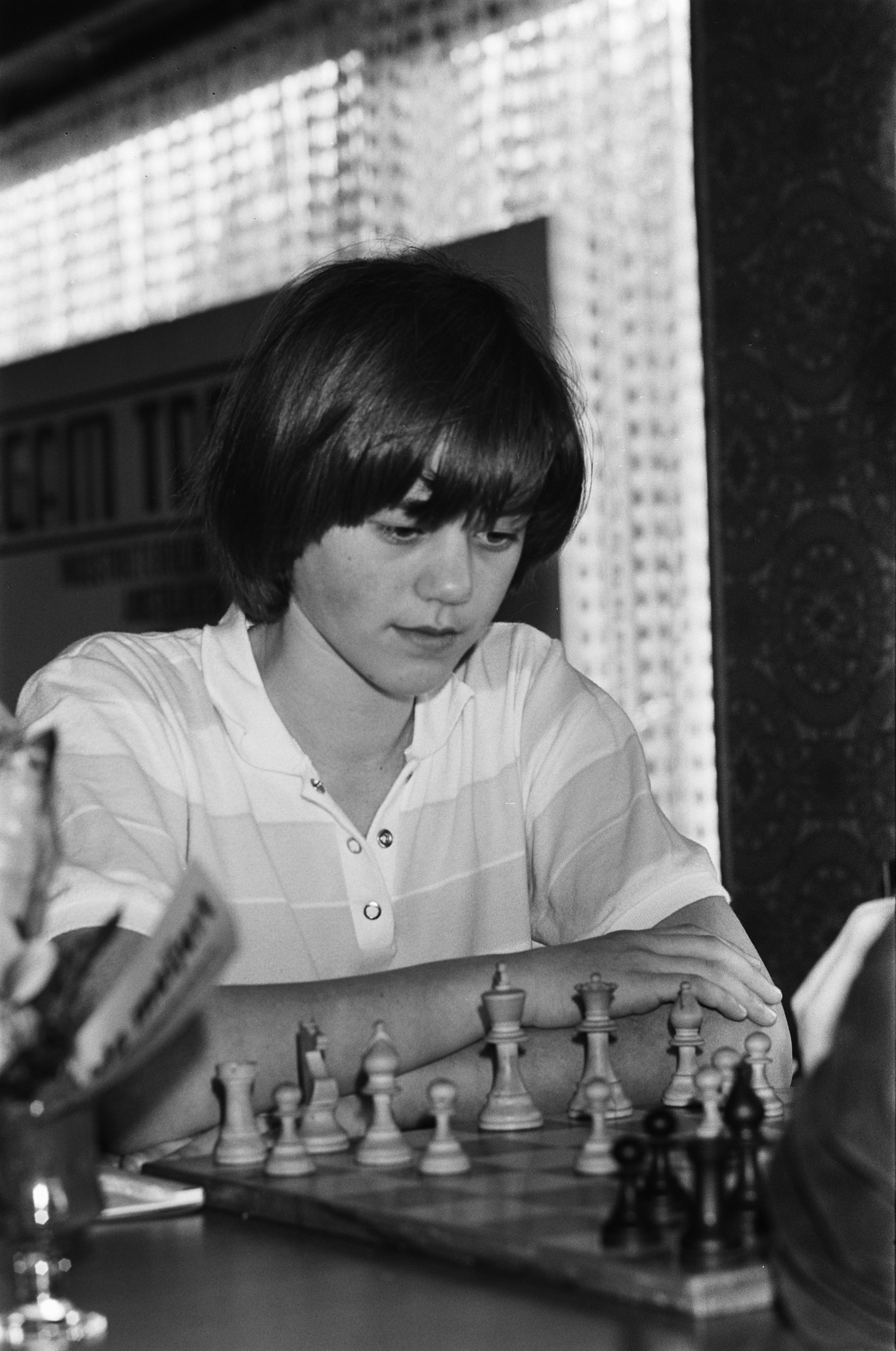
- Heleen Van Arkel-de Greef in 1981

Personal information
- Born: 15 September 1965 (age 60)

Chess career
- Country: Netherlands
- Title: Woman International Master (1985)
- Peak rating: 2250 (July 1987)

Heleen Van Arkel-de Greef (née de Greef; born 15 September 1965) is a Dutch chess Woman International Master (1985), two-times Dutch Women's Chess Championships winner (1984, 1986).

== Chess career ==
In 1981, in Bognor Regis Heleen Van Arkel-de Greef won a bronze medal in World Youth Chess Cup in U16 girls age group (at that time it was an unofficial world championship in this age category).

In the 1980s and 1990s, Heleen Van Arkel-de Greef was among the leading Dutch female chess players. She competed many times in the individual finals of the Dutch Women's Chess Championship and two times won this tournament: 1984 (shared 1st place with Carla Bruinenberg) and 1986.

Heleen Van Arkel-de Greef four time participated in Women's World Chess Championship West European Subzonal tournaments:

- in 1985, in Amsterdam and shared 2nd - 4th place;
- in 1987, in Budel and shared 3rd - 5th place;
- in 1990, in Oisterwijk and ranked in 6th place;
- in 1991, in Oisterwijk and shared 3rd - 5th place.

Heleen Van Arkel-de Greef played for Netherlands in the Women's Chess Olympiads:

- In 1984, at third board in the 26th Chess Olympiad (women) in Thessaloniki (+6, =2, -2),
- In 1988, at third board in the 28th Chess Olympiad (women) in Thessaloniki (+6, =2, -4),
- In 1990, at second board in the 29th Chess Olympiad (women) in Novi Sad (+5, =2, -4),
- In 1992, at third board in the 30th Chess Olympiad (women) in Manila (+2, =4, -3).

She achieved the highest rating in her career so far on July 1, 1987, with a score of 2250 points, she was 64th - 69th place on the FIDE world list, while also taking 1st place among Dutch female chess players. Since 1996, Heleen Van Arkel-de Greef has not participated in tournaments classified by the International Chess Federation.
