= Rudy Douven =

Dutch chess player

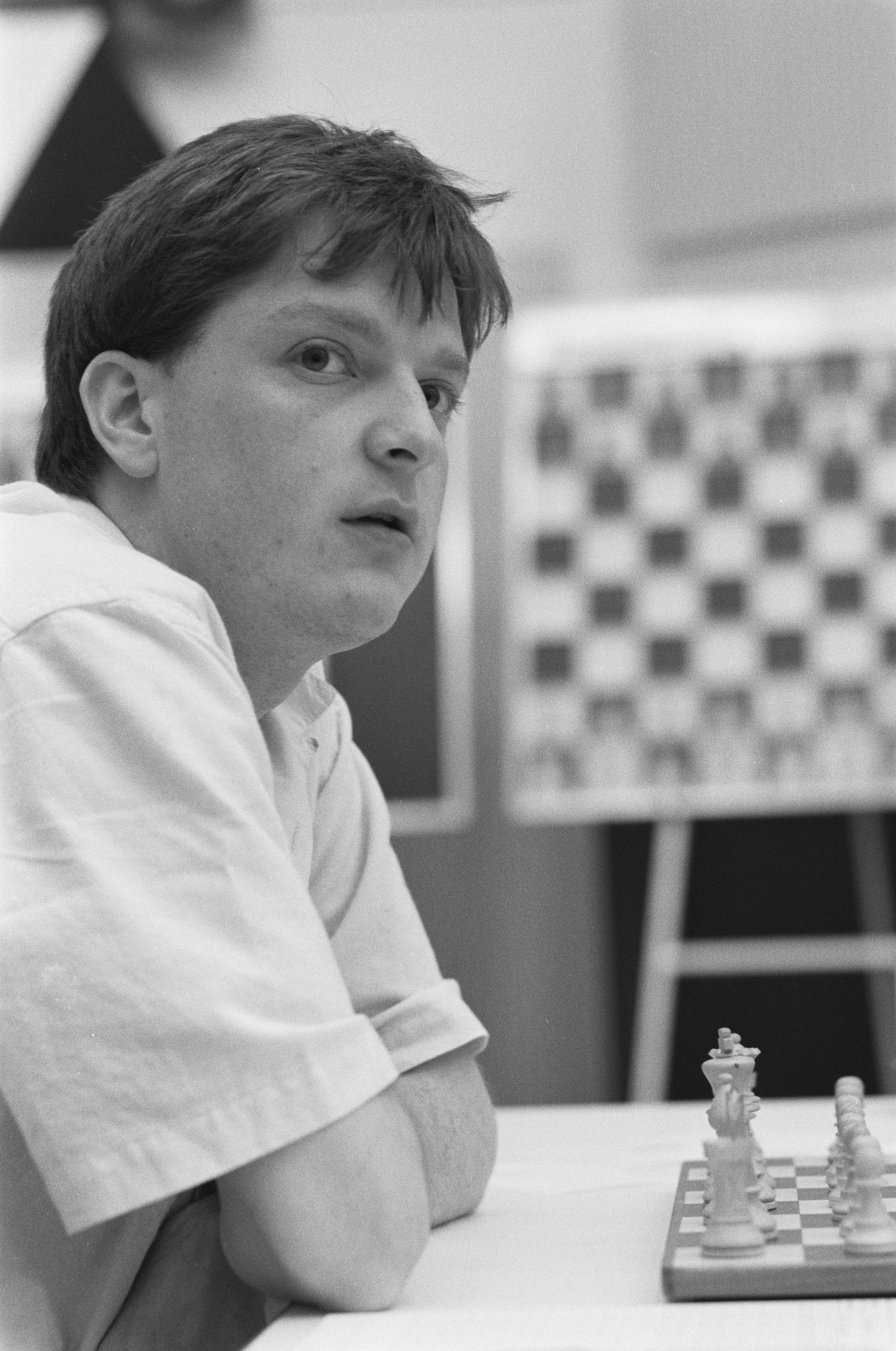
- Rudy Douven in 1988

Personal information
- Born: 5 May 1961 (age 65) Heerlen, Netherlands

Chess career
- Country: Netherlands
- Title: International Master (1986)
- Peak rating: 2475 (July 1989)

Rudy Douven (born 5 May 1961), is a Dutch chess International Master (IM) (1986), Dutch Chess Championship winner (1988), Chess Olympiad team bronze medalist (1988).

== Biography ==
In 1979, Rudy Douven won Dutch Junior Chess Championship in U20 age group and ranked 4th in World Junior Chess Championship. He two times in row played for Netherlands in European Junior Chess Championship in U20 age group (1980, 1981). In 1988, in Hilversum Rudy Douven won the Dutch Chess Championship. In 1989, in Lugano he shared 3rd place in International Chess Tournament Lugano Open.

Rudy Douven played for Netherlands in the Chess Olympiad:

- In 1988, at second reserve board in the 28th Chess Olympiad in Thessaloniki (+2, =2, -1) and won team bronze medal.

In 1986, he was awarded the FIDE International Master (IM) title. Since the early 1990s, Rudy Douven has never repeated his best achievements in chess tournaments, which he has rarely participated in over the years.
