= Erika Belle (chess player) =

Dutch chess player (born 1956)

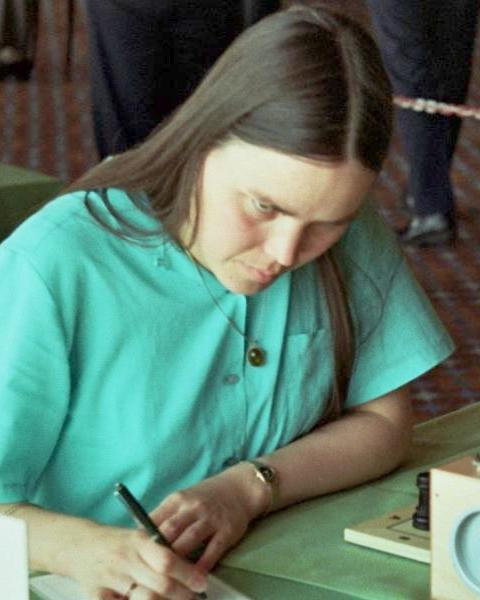
- Belle in 1982

Personal information
- Born: 20 January 1956 (age 70)

Chess career
- Country: Netherlands
- Title: Woman International Master (1982)
- Peak rating: 2155 (July 1987)

Erika Belle (born 20 January 1956) is a Dutch chess player who holds the FIDE title of Woman International Master (1982). She was a three-time winner of the Dutch Women's Chess Championship (1975, 1980, 1981).

== Biography ==
From the mid-1970s to the mid-1980s, Belle was one of the leading Dutch women chess players. She won the Dutch Women's Chess Championships three times, in 1975, 1980 and 1981. She participated in many international chess tournaments. In 1979, she tied for 2nd place with Gertrude Baumstark in the Women's International Chess tournament in Nałęczów (tournament won by Tünde Csonkics). In 1981, she ranked 2nd behind Nieves García Vicente in the Women's World Chess Championship Zonal tournament in Benidorm, and as a result she qualified for the Interzonal Tournament. In 1982, she was awarded the FIDE Woman International Master (WIM) title. In 1982, Belle participated in the Women's World Chess Championship Interzonal Tournament in Bad Kissingen and was ranked 11th.

Belle played for the Netherlands in the Women's Chess Olympiads:

- In 1974, at first reserve board in the 6th Chess Olympiad (women) in Medellín (+2, =2, -1),
- In 1976, at third board in the 7th Chess Olympiad (women) in Haifa (+4, =1, -2),
- In 1978, at first reserve board in the 8th Chess Olympiad (women) in Buenos Aires (+3, =3, -2),
- In 1980, at second board in the 9th Chess Olympiad (women) in Valletta (+4, =3, -3),
- In 1982, at third board in the 10th Chess Olympiad (women) in Lucerne (+8, =3, -1) and won an individual bronze medal,
- In 1984, at first reserve board in the 26th Chess Olympiad (women) in Thessaloniki (+3, =3, -3).
