= Iwona Bos-Swiecik =

Dutch chess player

Personal information
- Born: 24 November 1958 (age 67)

Chess career
- Country: Poland; Netherlands (from 1992)
- Title: Woman International Master (1993)
- Peak rating: 2245 (January 1991)

Iwona Bos-Swiecik (née Świecik; born 24 November 1958) is a Polish and Dutch (from 1992) chess Woman International Master (1993), Dutch Women's Chess Championship winner (1993).

== Chess career ==
In 1972, Iwona Bos-Swiecik won the title of junior chess vice-champion of Poland in Szamotuły. She won the second silver medal three years later in Polanica-Zdrój, while in 1976 in Toruń she took 1st place and won the title of national champion in the under-20 category. In the same year, Iwona Bos-Swiecik made her debut in the final of the Polish Women's Chess Championships. Until 1991, she played in the final tournaments 13 times, winning bronze medals twice: in the 1981 in Poznań and in the 1990 in Konin. In 1987 and 1988 she took top positions in international female chess tournaments in Nałęczów (4th and 3rd place, respectively).

Iwona Bos-Swiecik played for the Netherlands in the Women's Chess Olympiad:

- In 1990, at first reserve board in the 29th Chess Olympiad (women) in Novi Sad (+6, =1, -3).

Iwona Bos-Swiecik has represented the Netherlands since 1992. In 1993, she won the Dutch Women's Chess Championship, and in 1998 and 1999 she took 4th place twice in the championships. She last played in the Dutch Women's Chess Championship final in 2002.

She achieved the best rating in her career on 1 January 1991, with a score of 2245 points, she shared 3rd - 4th place (after Agnieszka Brustman and Hanna Ereńska-Radzewska, together with Grażyna Szmacińska) among Polish female chess players.
