= Mariëtte Drewes =

Dutch chess player (born 1967)

Personal information
- Born: 21 February 1967 (age 59)

Chess career
- Country: Netherlands
- Title: Woman FIDE Master (1990)
- Peak rating: 2120 (January 1990)

Mariëtte Drewes (born 21 February 1967) is a Dutch chess Woman FIDE Master, Dutch Women's Chess Championship winner (1989).

== Chess career ==
As a youth chess player, Mariëtte Drewes won the title in Category C at the Dutch Youth Rapid Chess Championship in 1979 and in Category B in 1981 and 1982. In 1984, Mariëtte Drewes finished fourth at the Dutch Women's Chess Championship. In 1986, in Băile Herculane she participated in European Girls' Junior Chess Championship and ranked in 12th place. In 1989, she won the Dutch Women's Chess Championship.

Mariëtte Drewes two time participated in Women's World Chess Championship West European Subzonal tournaments:

- in 1987, in Budel and ranked in 6th place;
- in 1990, in Oisterwijk and ranked in 7th place.

Mariëtte Drewes played for Netherlands in the Women's Chess Olympiad:

- In 1988, at first reserve board in the 28th Chess Olympiad (women) in Thessaloniki (+3, =2, -3).
