= Catharina Roodzant =

Dutch chess player

Roodzant (1st Women's Chess Olympiad, Emmen 1957)

Catharina (Toos) Roodzant (née Glimmerveen) (21 October 1896, Rotterdam – 24 February 1999) was a Dutch female chess master.

She won thrice the female Dutch Chess Championship (1935, 1936 and 1938). Roodzant lost a match for the title to Fenny Heemskerk 0.5 : 4.5 in 1937, and lost two matches to Sonja Graf, 0.5 : 3.5 in 1937 and 1 : 3 in 1939, both in Rotterdam.

She tied for 10-16th in the 6th Women's World Chess Championship at Stockholm 1937, and tied for 7-8th in the 7th WWCC which took place during the 8th Chess Olympiad at Buenos Aires 1939 (Vera Menchik won both events).
