= Marisca Kouwenhoven =

Dutch chess player

Personal information
- Born: 5 January 1976 (age 50)

Chess career
- Country: Netherlands
- Title: Woman FIDE Master
- Peak rating: 2135 (July 1997)

Marisca Kouwenhoven (born 5 January 1976) is a Dutch chess Woman FIDE Master, Dutch Women's Chess Championship winner (1995).

== Chess career ==
In 1992, Marisca Kouwenhoven won Dutch Girl's Chess Championship in U18 age group. In 1993 she won Dutch Junior Chess Championship in U20 girls group. She played in European Youth Chess Championship (1992, 1993, 1994), in World Youth Chess Championship (1990, 1992, 1993, 1994), European Junior Chess Championship (1996) and World Junior Chess Championship (1995) in various girls age groups.

In 1995, she won the Dutch Women's Chess Championship. She last played in the Dutch Women's Chess Championship final in 2002.

Marisca Kouwenhoven played for Netherlands in the Women's Chess Olympiad:

- In 1996, at reserve board in the 32nd Chess Olympiad (women) in Yerevan (+4, =1, -4).

In addition to chess, she is interested in Jujutsu.

After 2006, she rarely participates in chess tournaments.
