= Arnold van Foreest =

Dutch chess player (1863–1954)

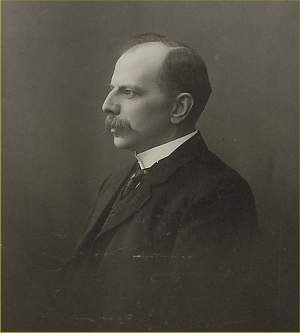

Personal information
- Born: Arnold Engelinus van Foreest; 29 June 1863 Haarlemmermeer, Netherlands
- Died: 24 June 1954 (aged 90) Apeldoorn, Netherlands

Chess career
- Country: Netherlands

Jonkheer Arnold Engelinus van Foreest (29 June 1863 – 24 June 1954) was a Dutch chess master. The younger brother of Dirk van Foreest, he thrice won Dutch Championship in 1889, 1893, and 1902. He is the great-great grandfather of the siblings Jorden van Foreest, the 2016 Dutch Champion, Lucas van Foreest, the 2019 Dutch Champion, and Machteld van Foreest, the 2022 Dutch Women's Champion.

By profession, van Foreest was an inspector at the Dutch postal company, and also held positions in the Dutch Chess Federation, including one year as president.

== Chess career ==
He took 8th at The Hague 1878 (A. Polak Daniels won), took 5th at Utrecht 1886 (NED-ch, his brother Dirk won), took 3rd, behind Rudolf Loman and Dirk van Foreest, at Rotterdam 1888 (NED-ch), and took 8th at Amsterdam 1889 (it, Amos Burn won).

Arnold van Foreest won at Gouda 1889 (NED-ch), shared 1st at Groningen 1893 (NED-ch), won at Groningen 1896, took 2nd, behind Bleijkmans, at Leiden 1896, tied for 3rd-4th at The Hague 1898 (Jan Diderik Tresling won), took 3rd at Haarlem 1901 (Adolf Georg Olland won), and won at Rotterdam 1902. He also shared 1st with Frank James Marshall at Amsterdam 1911 (Quadrangular), and took 14th at Scheveningen 1913 (Alexander Alekhine won).
