= Hanneke van Parreren =

Dutch chess player (born 1953)

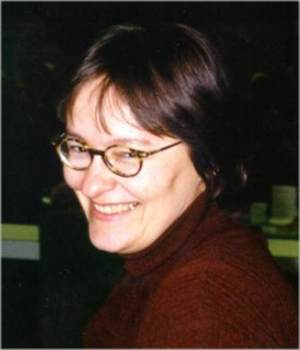

Personal information
- Born: 1 September 1953 (age 72)

Chess career
- Country: Netherlands
- Title: Woman FIDE Master (1988)
- Peak rating: 2195 (January 1994)

Hanneke van Parreren (born 1 September 1953) is a Dutch chess player who holds the FIDE title of Woman FIDE Master. She was a winner of the Dutch Women's Chess Championship (1985).

== Biography ==
From the end of 1970s to the mid-1980s, Hanneke van Parreren was one of the leading Dutch women chess players. She won the Dutch Women's Chess Championships in 1985 (shared with Jessica Harmsen).

Hanneke van Parreren participated in many international chess tournaments. In 1985, in Amsterdam she shared 2nd place in the Women's World Chess Championship Atlantic European subzonal tournament. In 1990, in Oisterwijk Hanneke van Parreren ranked in 5th place in the Women's World Chess Championship West European subzonal tournament. In 1993, in Delden she shared 4th place in the Women's World Chess Championship West Europe Zonal tournament.

Hanneke van Parreren played for the Netherlands in the Women's Chess Olympiads:

- In 1978, at third board in the 8th Chess Olympiad (women) in Buenos Aires (+3, =3, -5),
- In 1980, at third board in the 9th Chess Olympiad (women) in Valletta (+3, =3, -5),
- In 1982, at first reserve board in the 10th Chess Olympiad (women) in Lucerne (+4, =4, -2),
- In 1994, at third board in the 31st Chess Olympiad (women) in Moscow (+3, =4, -3).

Hanneke van Parreren is the daughter of the psychologist Carel van Parreren and partner of Paul van der Sterren.
