= H. W. B. Gifford =

Henry William Birkmyre Gifford (born 1847, Australia – 12 April 1924, Kensington, London) was an English chess master.

Biographical information on Gifford is scarce. He was the first unofficial Dutch Champion when shared he shared first place with Benjamin Willem Blijdenstein (A. H. van Blijdenstein in other sources) and won a play-off game against him at The Hague 1873. He shared first with A. de Lelie at Amsterdam 1874 (NED-ch) but lost a play-off game to him, and again won at Rotterdam 1875 (NED-ch). On 18 June 1877, he married Eliza Goldsmid in London and then moved to France.

He took 11th in the Paris 1878 chess tournament (Johannes Zukertort and Szymon Winawer won), and tied for 5–6th at Paris 1881 (Edward Chamier won).
