= Christiaan Messemaker =

Dutch chess player

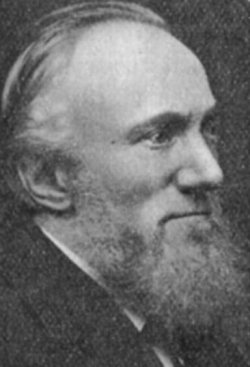

Personal information
- Born: 24 May 1821 Gouda, South Holland, Netherlands
- Died: 16 November 1905 (aged 84) Gouda, South Holland, Netherlands

Chess career
- Country: Netherlands

Christiaan Messemaker (24 May 1821 – 16 November 1905) was a Dutch chess player, two-times unofficial Dutch Chess Championship winner (1882, 1884).

== Life ==
Christiaan Messemaker was born one day after the wedding of his parents, Jacobus Messemaker and Maria Prince. His father died when he was fourteen years old and his mother remarried in 1836 to the Gouda tobacco shopkeeper Josuwa van der Zwalm. Messemaker followed in his stepfather's footsteps and also became a tobacco seller in Gouda. He married Ida Alida Welter on March 29, 1843.

Messemaker died in 1905 at the age of 84.

== Chess career ==
During the Dutch first national chess tournament of 1858 in Nijmegen, Messemaker came second behind Thomas Werndly.

Messemaker, one of the strongest chess players in the Netherlands at the time, played several games against the German grandmaster Adolf Anderssen, who was then considered one of the strongest players in the world.

Messemaker unofficially became Dutch Chess Champion in 1882 and 1884.

== History of Messemaker's association ==
Messemaker founded the chess association Vriendentrouw on March 11, 1850. There may also have been checkers in the association.

In 1860 the association was split and the 'real' chess players, led by Messemaker, continued under the name Practice and Policy, and from June 10, 1870, under the name of Chess and Checkers Company Palamédes.

In tribute to their predecessor, the founder and strongest chess player of the association, "one of the greatest chess players in our country", the association was given the name Messemaker in 1886.

In 1895, Norman van Lennep, secretary of the Dutch Chess Federation, made an inventory of chess associations in the Netherlands. Messemaker, who has often been caught with an administrative inaccuracy, then reported the founding date of his chess club as May 24 (his birthday), 1847 (which should have been 1850).

In the following years, activity within the association seems to decline and it fizzled out somewhere in the period from 1898 to 1907. The association was officially revived on May 14, 1907. Whether it was a matter of re-establishment or restart is still disputed.

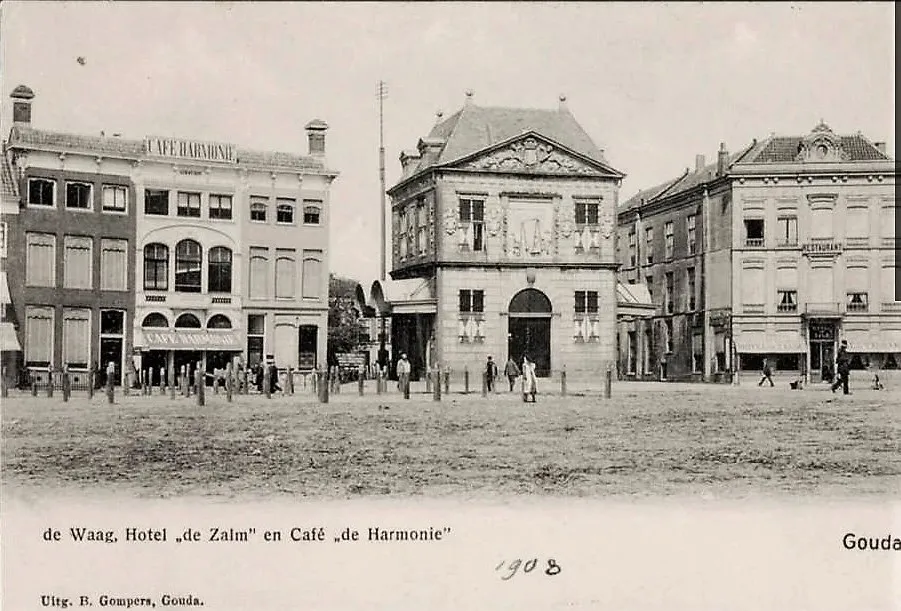
Waag (Gouda), hotel de Zalm and café de Harmonie

Until 1917, Café Harmonie on the Goudse Markt was the home base of the association. The association subsequently moved to the Blauwe Kruis on the Westhaven, the Vredebest Society, the Ronssehof, the Goudse Waarden on the Calslaan, the De Mammoet sports hall and since 2013 in Denksport Centrum de Hoog.

In 1993, the year reported by Messemaker to Van Lennep was added to the name of the association. The current name of the Gouda chess club is therefore Messemaker 1847.

== Honorary title ==
1848?-1852?: Honorary member of Strijdt met Beleid in Nijmegen.
