= Dutch Chess Championship =

Chess competition in the Netherlands

The Dutch Chess Championship was officially established in 1909, although unofficial champions stretch back to the 1870s.

== Early years ==
#	Year	City	Winner
1	1873	The Hague	Henry (H.W.B.) Gifford
2	1874	Amsterdam	Adrianus (A.A.G.) de Lelie
3	1875	Rotterdam	Henry (H.W.B.) Gifford
4	1876	Gouda	Julius (J.G.C.A.) de Vogel
5	1877	The Hague	Ansel Polak Daniels
6	1878	Amsterdam	Maarten van 't Kruijs
7	1879	Rotterdam	Charles (C.E.A.) Dupré
8	1880	Gouda	Henry Edward Bird
9	1881	The Hague	Levi Benima
10	1882	The Hague	Christiaan Messemaker
11	1883	Rotterdam	Levi Benima
12	1884	Gouda	Christiaan Messemaker
13	1885	The Hague	Dirk van Foreest
14	1886	Utrecht	Dirk van Foreest
15	1887	Amsterdam	Dirk van Foreest
16	1888	Rotterdam	Rudolf Loman
17	1889	Gouda	Arnold van Foreest
18	1890	The Hague	Rudolf Loman
19	1891	Utrecht	Rudolf Loman
20	1892	Amsterdam	Robbert van den Bergh
21	1893	Groningen	Arnold van Foreest; Rudolf Loman
22	1894	Rotterdam	Rudolf Loman
23	1895	Arnhem	Adolf Georg Olland
24	1896	Leiden	Dirk Bleijkmans
25	1897	Utrecht	Rudolf Loman
26	1898	The Hague	Jan Diderik Tresling
27	1899	Amsterdam	Henry Ernest Atkins
28	1900	Groningen	Gerard Oskam
29	1901	Haarlem	Adolf Georg Olland
30	1902	Rotterdam	Arnold van Foreest
31	1903	Hilversum	Paul Saladin Leonhardt
32	1904	Leeuwarden	Dirk Bleijkmans
33	1905	Scheveningen	Frank James Marshall
34	1906	Arnhem	Bernard Wolff Beffie
35	1907	Utrecht	Jan Willem te Kolsté
36	1908	Haarlem	Jan F. Esser

== Official championships ==
The official championship was established in 1909 as a biennial, twelve-player, round-robin tournament. As of 1970, the top five finishers were seeded into the next championship, one player was nominated by the selection committee and six came from preliminary qualifying tournaments. Three regional qualifying tournaments of eight to twelve players each were held over four weekends. Grandmasters were not required to qualify to play in the championship. In 1970, annual championships were instituted. In 1935 a championship for women was established.

Year	City (men)	Winner	Women's winner
1909	Leiden	Adolf Georg Olland	
1912	Delft	Rudolf Loman	
1913	Amsterdam	Johannes Esser	
1919	The Hague	Max Marchand	
1921	Nijmegen	Max Euwe	
1924	Amsterdam	Max Euwe	
1926	Utrecht	Max Euwe	
1929	Amsterdam	Max Euwe	
1933	The Hague	Max Euwe	
1935			Catharina Roodzant
1936	Rotterdam	Salo Landau	Catharina Roodzant
1937			Fenny Heemskerk
1938	Amsterdam	Max Euwe	Catharina Roodzant
1939	match Euwe - Landau	Max Euwe	Fenny Heemskerk
1942	match Euwe - van den Hoek	Max Euwe	
1946			Fenny Heemskerk
1947	match	Max Euwe	
1948	match Euwe - van Scheltinga	Max Euwe	Fenny Heemskerk
1950	Amsterdam	Max Euwe	Fenny Heemskerk
1952	Enschede	Max Euwe	Fenny Heemskerk
1954	Amsterdam	Jan Hein Donner	Fenny Heemskerk
1955	1954 match	Max Euwe	
1956			Fenny Heemskerk
1957	Amsterdam	Jan Hein Donner	
1958	Amsterdam	Jan Hein Donner	Fenny Heemskerk
1960			Corry Vreeken
1961	The Hague	Hiong Liong Tan	Fenny Heemskerk
1962			Corry Vreeken
1963	The Hague	Franciscus Kuijpers	
1964			Corry Vreeken
1965	The Hague	Lodewijk Prins	
1966			Corry Vreeken
1967	Zierikzee	Hans Ree	
1968			Ingrid Tuk
1969	Leeuwarden	Hans Ree	
1970	Leeuwarden	Eddie Scholl	Corry Vreeken
1971	Leeuwarden	Hans Ree	Rie Timmer
1972	Leeuwarden	Coen Zuidema	Rie Timmer
1973	Leeuwarden	Genna Sosonko	Ada van der Giessen
1974	Leeuwarden	Jan Timman	Cathy van der Mije
1975	Leeuwarden	Jan Timman	Erika Belle
1976	Leeuwarden	Jan Timman	Cathy van der Mije
1977	Leeuwarden	Viktor Korchnoi	Cathy van der Mije
1978	Leeuwarden	Jan Timman; Genna Sosonko	Cathy van der Mije
1979	Leeuwarden	Gert Ligterink	Cathy van der Mije
1980	Leeuwarden	Jan Timman	Erika Belle
1981	Leeuwarden	Jan Timman	Erika Belle
1982	Amsterdam	Hans Ree	Carla Bruinenberg
1983	Hilversum	Jan Timman	Carla Bruinenberg
1984	Hilversum	John van der Wiel	Carla Bruinenberg; Heleen de Greef
1985	Hilversum	Paul van der Sterren	Jessica Harmsen; Hanneke van Parreren
1986	Hilversum	John van der Wiel	Heleen de Greef
1987	Hilversum	Jan Timman	Jessica Harmsen
1988	Hilversum	Rudy Douven	Jessica Harmsen
1989	Hilversum	Marinus Kuijf	Mariëtte Drewes
1990	Hilversum	Jeroen Piket	Renate Limbach
1991	Eindhoven	Jeroen Piket	Anne Marie Benschop
1992	Eindhoven	Jeroen Piket	Erika Sziva
1993	Eindhoven	Paul van der Sterren	Iwona Bos-Swiecik
1994	Amsterdam	Jeroen Piket	Erika Sziva
1995	Amsterdam	Ivan Sokolov	Marisca Kouwenhoven
1996	Amsterdam	Jan Timman	Erika Sziva
1997	Rotterdam	Predrag Nikolić	Peng Zhaoqin
1998	Rotterdam	Ivan Sokolov	Erika Sziva
1999	Rotterdam	Predrag Nikolić	Erika Sziva
2000	Rotterdam	Loek van Wely	Peng Zhaoqin
2001	Leeuwarden	Loek van Wely	Peng Zhaoqin
2002	Leeuwarden	Loek van Wely	Peng Zhaoqin
2003	Leeuwarden	Loek van Wely	Peng Zhaoqin
2004	Leeuwarden	Loek van Wely	Peng Zhaoqin
2005	Leeuwarden	Loek van Wely	Peng Zhaoqin
2006	Hilversum	Sergei Tiviakov	Peng Zhaoqin
2007	Hilversum	Sergei Tiviakov	Peng Zhaoqin
2008	Hilversum	Jan Smeets	Peng Zhaoqin
2009	Haaksbergen	Anish Giri	Peng Zhaoqin
2010	Eindhoven	Jan Smeets	Peng Zhaoqin
2011	Boxtel	Anish Giri	Peng Zhaoqin
2012	Amsterdam	Anish Giri	Tea Lanchava
2013	Amsterdam	Dimitri Reinderman	Lisa Schut
2014	Amsterdam	Loek van Wely	Anne Haast
2015	Amsterdam	Anish Giri	Anne Haast
2016	Amsterdam	Jorden van Foreest	Anne Haast
2017	Amsterdam	Loek van Wely	Anne Haast
2018	Amsterdam	Sergei Tiviakov	Peng Zhaoqin
2019	Amsterdam	Lucas van Foreest	Iozefina Păuleţ
2021	Hoogeveen/Rotterdam	Max Warmerdam	Anne Haast
2022	Groningen	Erwin L'Ami	Machteld van Foreest
2023	Utrecht	Anish Giri	Eline Roebers
2024	Utrecht	Max Warmerdam	Maaike Keetman
2025	Venlo	Jorden van Foreest	Machteld van Foreest
2026	Aalsmeer	Sergei Tiviakov	Machteld van Foreest
