= Adrianus de Lelie =

Dutch chess player

Personal information
- Born: 31 May 1827
- Died: 15 March 1899 (aged 71)

Chess career
- Country: Netherlands

Adrianus Adam Gerardus de Lelie (31 May 1827 – 15 March 1899) was a Dutch chess player, unofficial Dutch Chess Championship winner (1874).

== Chess career ==
In the 60s and 70s of the 19th century, Adrianus de Lelie was one of the strongest Dutch chess players. In 1861, in Amsterdam he lost match to Adolf Anderssen with 0:2. In 1874, in Amsterdam he shared first place with H. W. B. Gifford in second Dutch unofficial chess championship and won a play-off game against him.
