= Erika Sziva =

Hungarian-born Dutch chess player

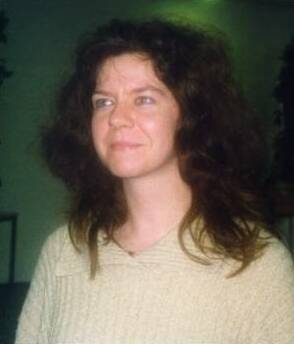

Personal information
- Born: 8 June 1967 (age 59) Budapest, Hungary

Chess career
- Country: Hungary; Netherlands
- Title: Woman Grandmaster (2000)
- FIDE rating: 2217 (October 2019)
- Peak rating: 2331 (January 2001)

Erika Sziva (born 8 June 1967) is a Hungarian born Dutch Woman Grandmaster (WGM, 2000). She was a winner of the Hungarian Women's Chess Championship (1988) and a five-time winner of the Dutch Women's Chess Championship (1992, 1994, 1996, 1998, 1999).

== Biography ==
In 1988, Erika Sziva won Hungarian Women's Chess Championship. In 1989, she married and moved to live in the Netherlands. In 1990, at Interzonal Tournament in Genting Highlands Erika Sziva ranked 12th place. She five times won Dutch Women's Chess Championships: 1992, 1994, 1996, 1998 and 1999). In 2000, Erika Sziva participated in Women's World Chess Championship by knock-out system and in the first round lost to Natalia Zhukova.

Erika Sziva played for Netherlands in the Women's Chess Olympiads:

- In 1992, at first board in the 30th Chess Olympiad (women) in Manila (+4, =3, -4),
- In 1994, at first board in the 31st Chess Olympiad (women) in Moscow (+5, =5, -2),
- In 1996, at first board in the 32nd Chess Olympiad (women) in Yerevan (+5, =4, -2),
- In 1998, at second board in the 33rd Chess Olympiad (women) in Elista (+3, =8, -0),
- In 2000, at second board in the 34th Chess Olympiad (women) in Istanbul (+5, =6, -2).

Erika Sziva played for Netherlands in the European Team Chess Championships:

- In 1997, at first board in the 2nd European Team Chess Championship (women) in Pula (+3, =2, -2).

In 1999, she was awarded the FIDE Woman International Master (WIM) title and received the FIDE Woman Grandmaster (WGM) title year later.
