= Fenny Heemskerk =

Dutch chess player (1919–2007)

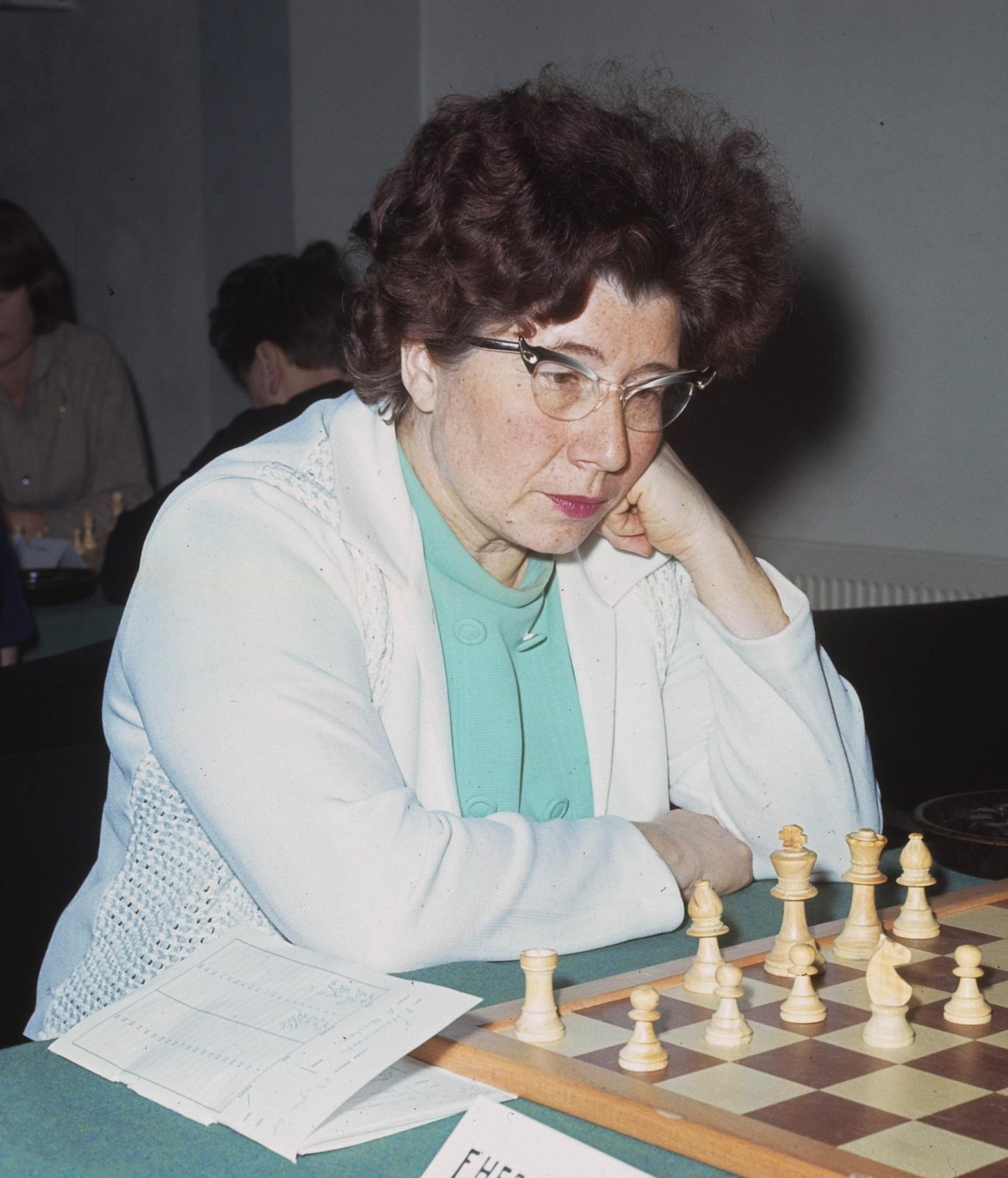
- Heemskerk in 1968

Personal information
- Born: December 3, 1919 Amsterdam, Netherlands
- Died: June 8, 2007 (aged 87) Amersfoort, Netherlands
- Spouse: Willem Koomen (m. 1940; div. 1944)

Chess career
- Country: Netherlands
- Title: Woman Grandmaster (1978)
- Peak rating: 2050 (January 1975)

Fenny Heemskerk (3 December 1919 in Amsterdam – 8 June 2007 in Amersfoort) was a Dutch chess player.

== Biography ==
She won the female Dutch Chess Championship ten times (1937, 1939, 1946, 1948, 1950, 1952, 1954, 1956, 1958 and 1961). Heemskerk won a match against Catharina Roodzant 4.5 : 0.5 in 1937, and lost a match to Sonja Graf 0 : 4 in 1939 in Amsterdam.

She took eighth place in Women's World Chess Championship at Moscow 1950 (Lyudmila Rudenko won), tied for second/third in Candidates Tournament at Moscow 1952 (Elisabeth Bykova won), took ninth place in Candidates Tournament at Moscow 1955 (Olga Rubtsova won), tied for 15–16th in Candidates Tournament at Vrnjacka Banja 1961 (Nona Gaprindashvili won).

She played in the 1st Women's Chess Olympiad at Emmen 1957 – but had to withdraw after only two days upon learning her father had died. In 1989, at the age of 70 she participated in the Moscow GMA qualifiers alongside strong male Grandmasters.

Heemskerk was awarded the Woman International Master (WIM) title in 1950, and the Woman Grandmaster (WGM) title in 1977. She was invested as a Knight of the Order of Orange-Nassau.

In January 1940 Heemskerk married FIDE Master Willem Koomen and soon gave birth to a daughter. The marriage broke up in 1944.
