= Carla Bruinenberg =

Dutch chess player (born 1944)

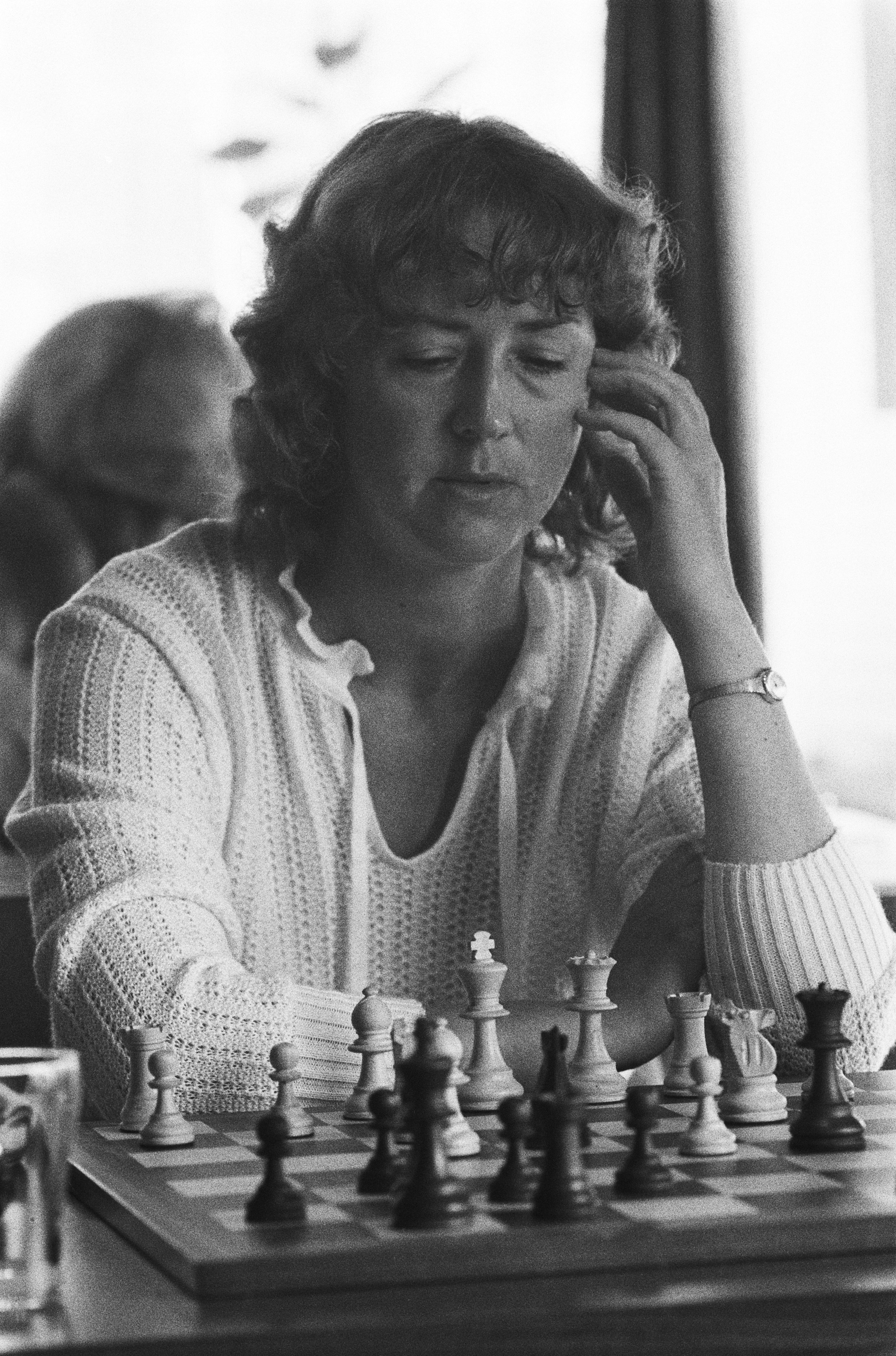
- Carla Bruinenberg in 1982

Personal information
- Born: 17 February 1944 (age 82) Deventer, Netherlands

Chess career
- Country: Netherlands
- Title: Woman FIDE Master (1984)
- Peak rating: 2175 (January 1987)

Carla Bruinenberg (née Van de Griendt; born 17 February 1944) is a Dutch chess Woman FIDE Master (1984), three-times Dutch Women's Chess Championships winner (1982, 1983, 1984).

== Chess career ==
In the 1980s, Bruinenberg was among the leading Dutch female chess players. She competed many times in the individual finals of the Dutch Women's Chess Championship and three times won this tournament: 1982, 1983, 1984 (shared 1st place with Heleen de Greef).

In 1987, in Budel, Bruinenberg participated in Women's World Chess Championship West European Subzonal tournament and ranked in 8th place.

Bruinenberg played for Netherlands in the Women's Chess Olympiads:

- In 1980, at first reserve board in the 9th Chess Olympiad (women) in Valletta (+4, =5, -2),
- In 1982, at second board in the 10th Chess Olympiad (women) in Lucerne (+4, =2, -4),
- In 1984, at second board in the 26th Chess Olympiad (women) in Thessaloniki (+5, =2, -4).

In 1984, she awarded the Women FIDE Master (WFM) title.
