= Corry Vreeken =

Dutch chess player (1928–2025)

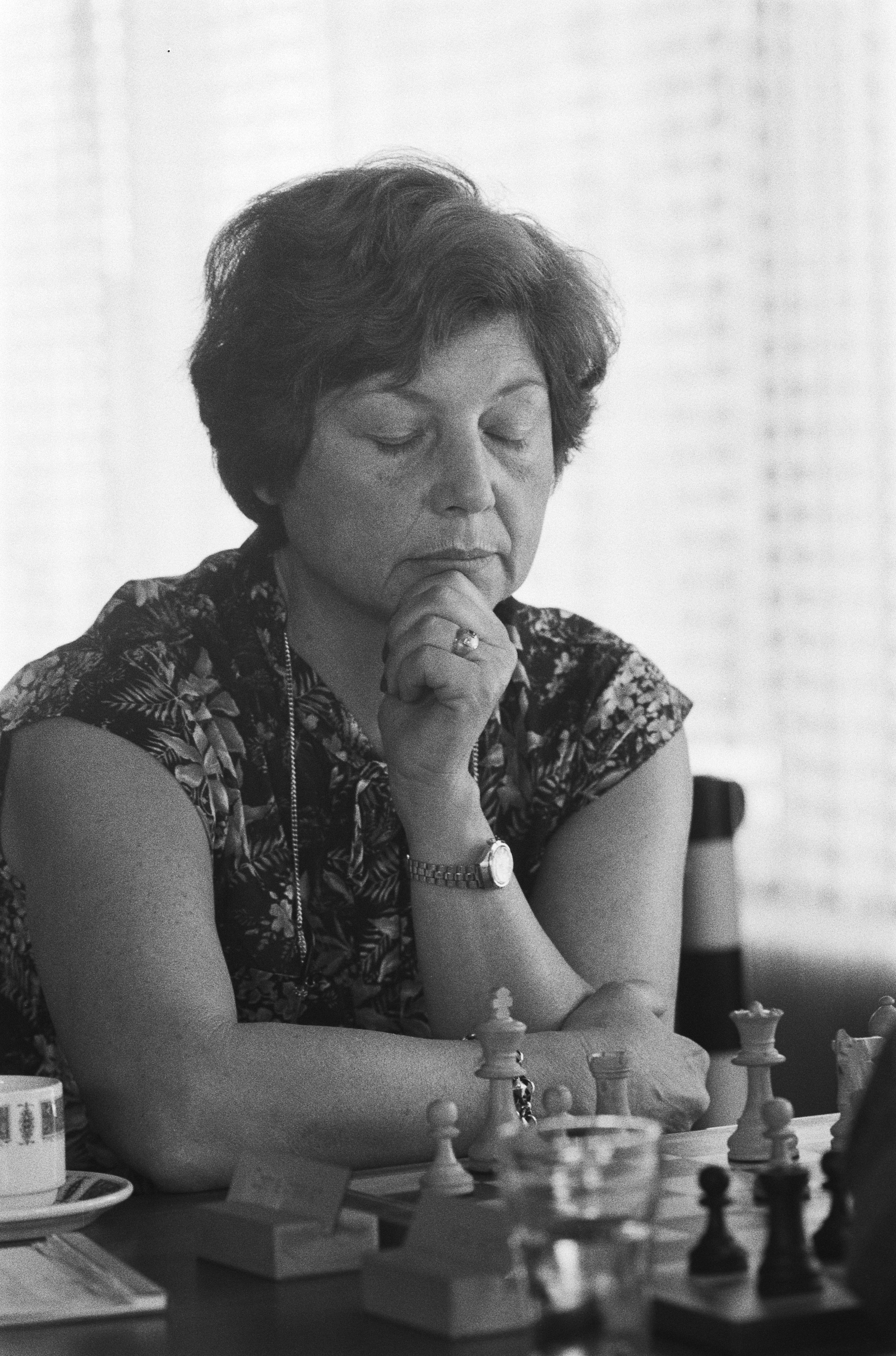
- Vreeken in 1982

Personal information
- Full name: Maria Cornelia Vreeken
- Born: 22 December 1928 Enkhuizen, Netherlands
- Died: 26 February 2025 (aged 96)

Chess career
- Country: Netherlands
- Title: Woman Grandmaster (1987)
- Peak rating: 2180 (July 1989)

Maria Cornelia Vreeken (née Corry Bouwman; 22 December 1928 – 26 February 2025), also known as Corry Vreeken-Bouwman, was a Dutch chess player who held the title of Woman Grandmaster (WGM, 1987). She was a five-time winner of the Dutch Women's Chess Championship (1960, 1962, 1964, 1966, 1970).

== Biography ==
In the 1960s and 1970s, Corry Vreeken was one of the leading Dutch women's chess players. She was five time Dutch Women's Chess Champion: 1960, 1962, 1964, 1966 and 1970, and participated in many international chess tournaments. Her best results were in Emmen (1962), shared 1st - 3rd place in Beverwijk (1968) and won zonal tournament in Biel/Bienne (1980).

Vreeken two times participated in the Women's World Chess Championship Interzonal Tournaments:

- In 1971, at Interzonal Tournament in Ohrid ranked 14th place;
- In 1976, at Interzonal Tournament in Rozendaal ranked 10th place.

Vreeken played for Netherlands in the Women's Chess Olympiads:

- In 1963, at first board in the 2nd Chess Olympiad (women) in Split (+1, =5, -4),
- In 1966, at first board in the 3rd Chess Olympiad (women) in Oberhausen (+5, =3, -2),
- In 1974, at first board in the 6th Chess Olympiad (women) in Medellín (+4, =4, -3),
- In 1976, at second board in the 7th Chess Olympiad (women) in Haifa (+4, =2, -3),
- In 1978, at second board in the 8th Chess Olympiad (women) in Buenos Aires (+5, =4, -2),
- In 1980, at first board in the 9th Chess Olympiad (women) in Valletta (+4, =4, -3),
- In 1982, at first board in the 10th Chess Olympiad (women) in Lucerne (+2, =2, -6).

In 1968 she was awarded the FIDE Woman International Master (WIM) title and in 1987 the Woman Grandmaster (WGM) honorary title.

Vreeken died on 26 February 2025, at the age of 96.
