= Bernard de Wolff =

Dutch painter, born 1955

Bernard de Wolff (1 November 1955 in Amsterdam) is a Dutch painter of contemporary cityscapes, cows, landscapes and nudes. His work is represented in art collections in the Netherlands, France, Germany, Sweden, Italy, the United Kingdom, Belgium, Denmark, Suriname, the United States, Canada, Japan, New Zealand, South Africa, India, Russia, Ukraine, Brazil, Israel, and China.

== Life ==
Bernard de Wolff studied Art History at the University of Amsterdam between 1982 and 1988. During his study he in-depth on classical archeology, cultural anthropology, theatrical media, aesthetics and cultural philosophy. He travelled multiple times to West Africa, experiences which contributed to his evolvement as an artist. His first art exhibition was in 1982 at gallery Memphis in The Hague. In 1988 he graduated as an art historian. During the 1980s Bernard de Wolff worked on some video productions, for example for the Allard Piersonmuseum (Amsterdam). His program “De streling” (“The caress”) was nominated for the Sony Video Award and “De Olympische Orde” (The Olympic Order”) was selected for the NVWFT Mediaprice. He is also responsible for the scenario and the music.

After graduation Bernard de Wolff further developed himself as a painter. During the 1990s his art exhibitions led him to the United States where he lectured on the art of painting landscapes. Important for his artistic development were his journeys to Suriname and Brazil in the 21st century. Also the city life of Amsterdam and Paris are a ubiquitously important source of inspiration for his work. However, ever since 2015 the Orient became an important source of inspiration. In 2016 Bernard de Wolff traveled, on invitation of the Chinese Academy of Art (division of the Department of the Culture, China) to Wushan China to experience the Chinese landscape for new landscape paintings. The exposition will is due 2017. Nevertheless, in 2015 and 2016 Bernard de Wolff already exposed his art at exhibitions in respectively, Jinan, Shanghai and Beijing.

Currently, Bernard de Wolff lives In Paris, France, where he is represented by art galleries among which the prestigious Schwab Beaubourg Gallery.

== Style ==
The artwork of Bernard de Wolff is characterized by his impressionism, while using expressive techniques. The oil paint is not just a medium to create an impression on the canvas, but as a substance, it is also an essential part of the artwork; the oil paint is present, visible, tangible. De Wolff's work is inspired by George Hendrik Breitner, Willem Witsen, Marius Bauer, Eugène Leroy, and Karel Appel. His main themes are contemporary cityscape, landscapes, cattle, and nudes.

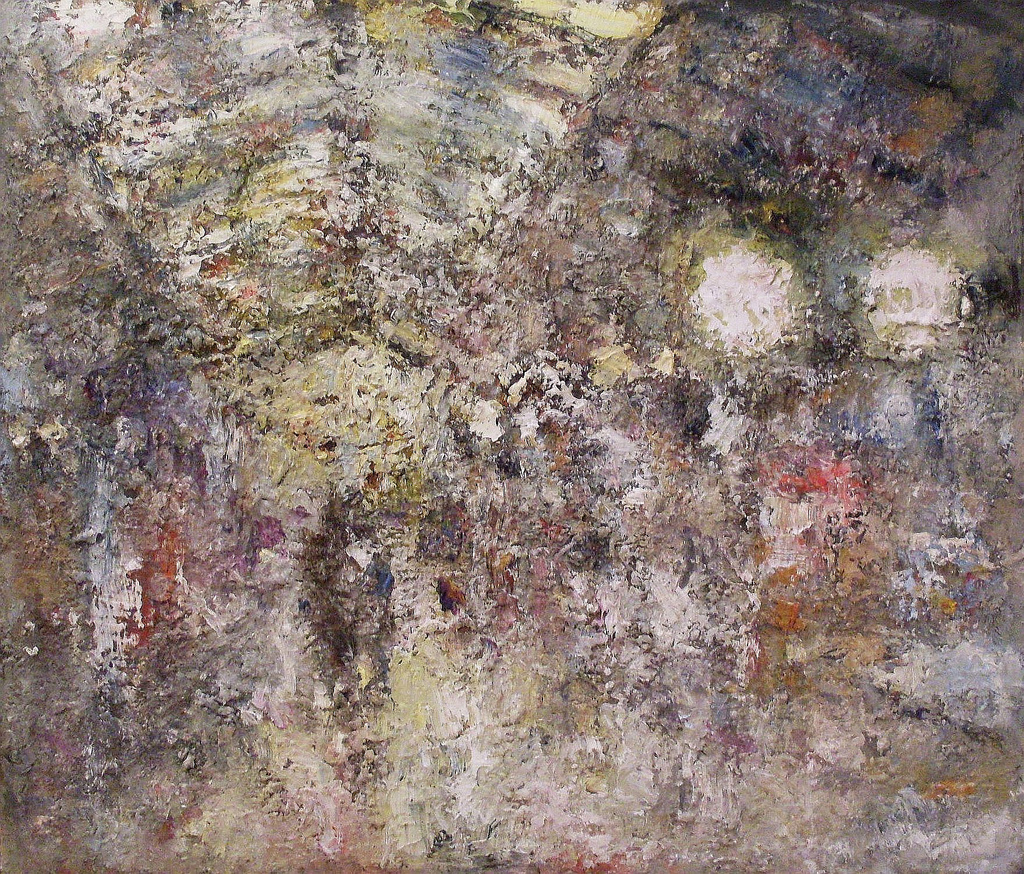
Gare du Nord, Last Train (120 x 140 cm)

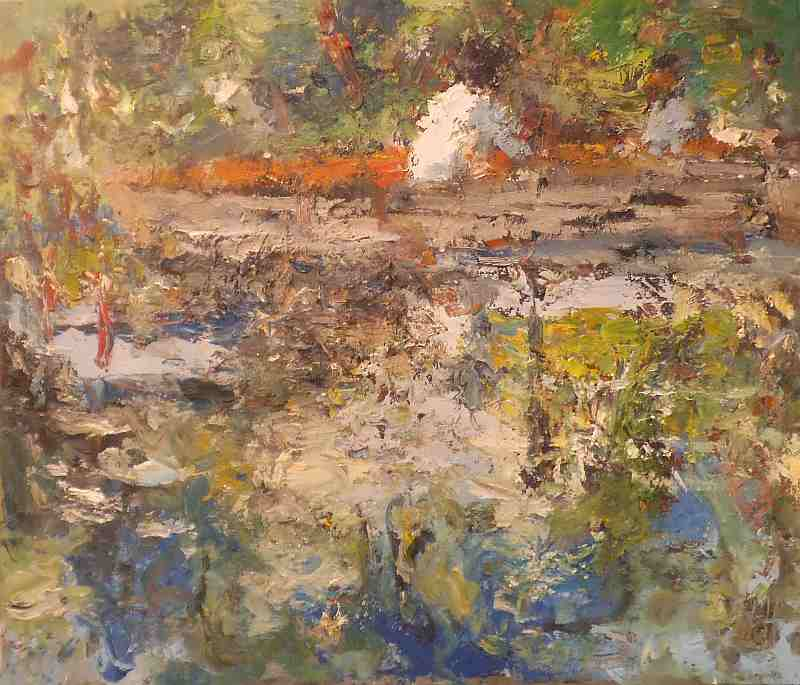
Row the Boat (120 x 140 cm)

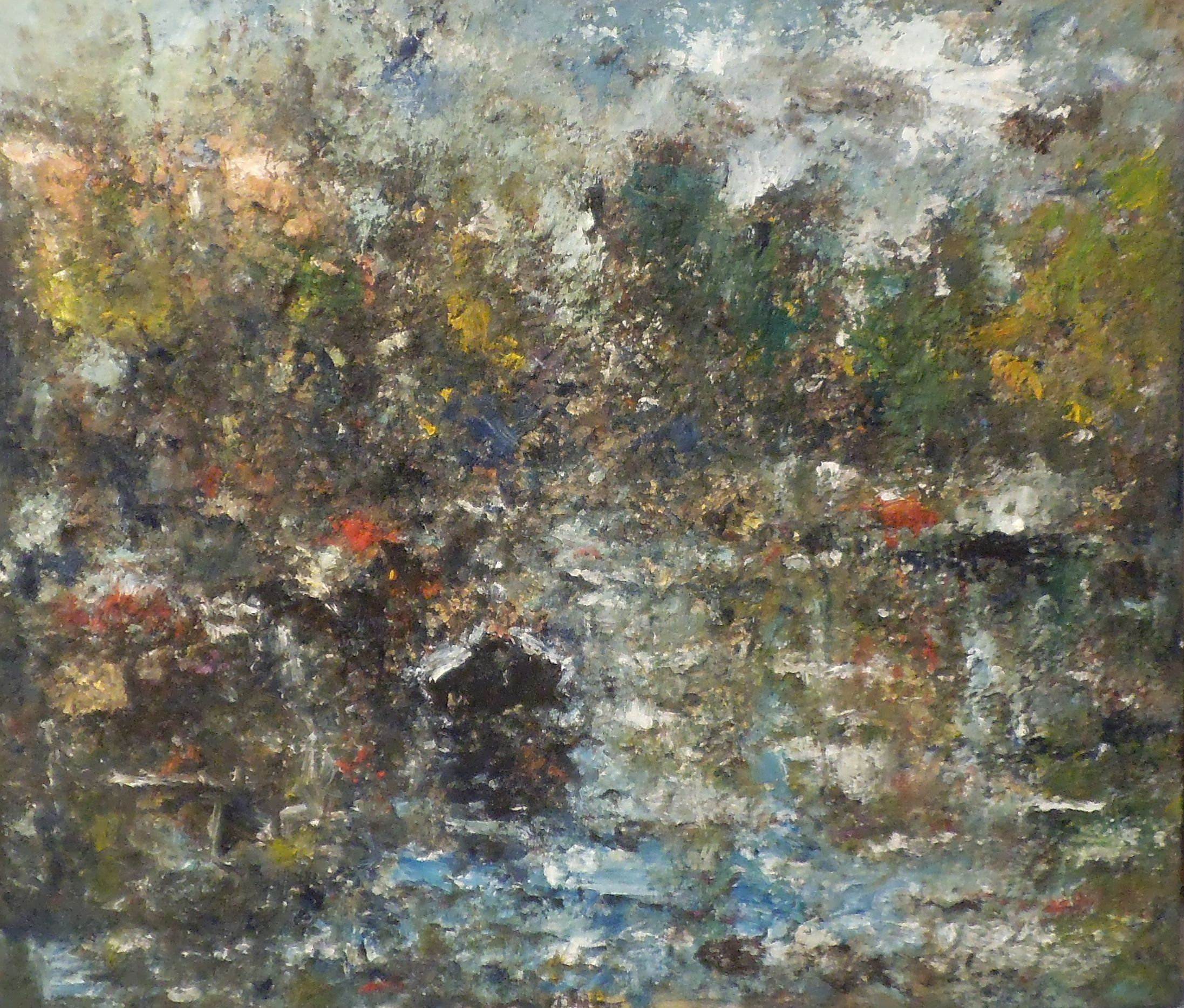
Canal (120 x 140 cm)

== Art work ==
Some artworks are:

- Gare Du Nord, Last train
- Row the Boat
- Canal
- La Ville
- Boulevard
- XVIeme Arrondissement
- Wandeling in de Stad (Stroll in the City)
- Bois de Boulogne
- Are You Looking at Me

== Awards ==
- 1980s
  - Nomination Sony Video Award for the program “De streling” (“The caress”)
  - Nomination NVWFT Mediaprice for the documentary “De Olympische Orde” ("The Olympic Order")
- 2000s
  - Winner Brooklyn Gallery Award (2002)
  - Winner Bronze Calla (2002)
  - Election top hundred contemporary Dutch artists, kunstweek.nl, position 21 (2008)

== Trivia ==
In 2005, in celebration of his fiftieth birthday, a book regarding Bernard de Wolff was released courtesy of Galery Peter Leen.
