= Coen Zuidema =

Dutch chess player

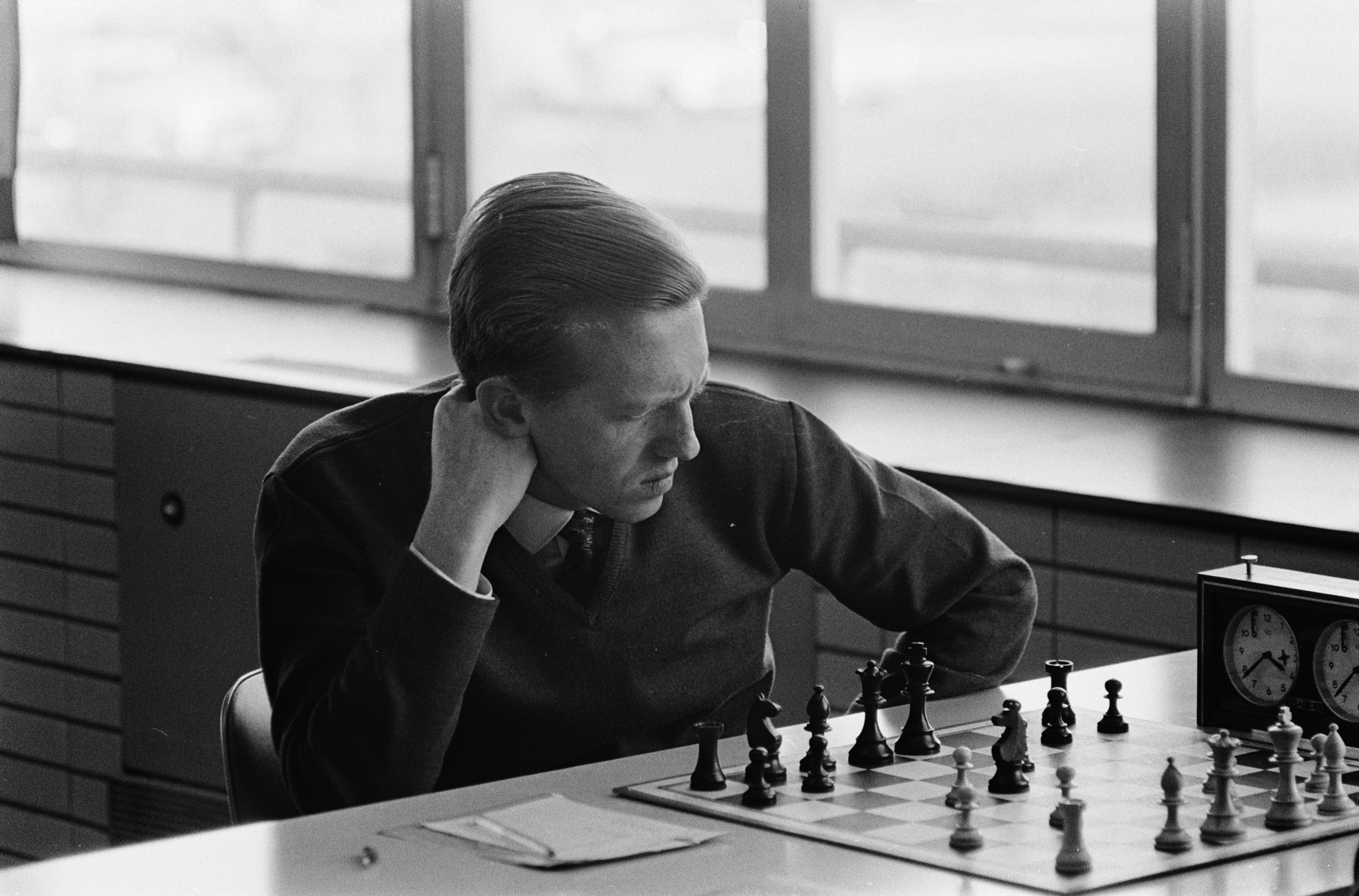
- Zuidema in Amsterdam, 1965

Personal information
- Full name: Coenraad Zuidema
- Born: 29 August 1942 (age 83) Surakarta, Indonesia

Chess career
- Country: Netherlands
- Title: International Master (1964)
- Peak rating: 2450 (January 1977)

Coen Zuidema (also Coenraad Zuidema, born 29 August 1942 in Surakarta, Indonesia) is a Dutch chess player.

Zuidema studied mathematics at VU University Amsterdam from 1960 to 1968. From 1974 until his retirement, he worked for IBM.

Coen Zuidema participated in several highly competitive chess tournaments, including in Tel Aviv, in Saint Petersburg, and in Belgrade. In 1963 he won the Niemeyer tournament for European players under 20. In 1964, he became an International Master (IM) of FIDE. In 1972, he won the Dutch Chess Championship.

His Elo rating is unchanged since 1977 and is 2450; this is also the highest number he has attained. His best estimated historical Elo rating before the introduction of the Elo rating is 2507, which he achieved in July 1966.
