= Adolf Georg Olland =

Dutch chess player (1867–1933)

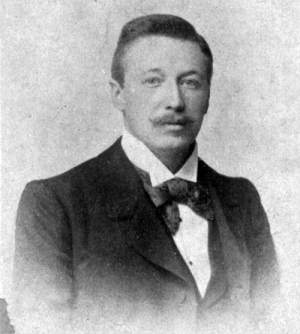

Personal information
- Born: April 13, 1867 Utrecht, Netherlands
- Died: July 22, 1933 (aged 66)

Chess career
- Country: Netherlands

Adolf Georg Olland (13 April 1867 – 22 July 1933) was the leading Dutch chess master in the time before Max Euwe. Born in Utrecht, he was a medical doctor.

Olland took 3rd at Amsterdam 1887 (Dirk van Foreest won); shared 1st at Amsterdam 1889 (Hauptturnier); took 2nd, behind Rudolf Loman, at Utrecht 1891; took 5th at Groningen 1893 (Loman won); took 2nd, behind Loman, at Rotterdam 1894; shared 1st at Arnheim 1895; took 2nd at Amsterdam 1899 behind Henry Ernest Atkins; took 2nd, behind Rudolf Swiderski, at Munich 1900 (12th DSB–Congress, Hauptturnier).

Olland won at Haarlem 1901; took 8th at Hannover 1902 (13th DSB–Congress, Dawid Janowski won); took 19th at Carlsbad 1907 (Akiba Rubinstein won). He shared 1st with Abraham Speijer at Leiden 1909 (1st NED-ch); took 4th at Stockholm 1912 (8th Nordic-ch, Alexander Alekhine won); took 3rd at Scheveningen 1913 (Alekhine won).

He tied for 7-8th at Hastings 1919 (Victory Congress, José Raúl Capablanca won); tied for 14-15th at Göteborg (B tournament, Paul Johner won); took 3rd at Utrecht 1920 (Quadrangular, Géza Maróczy won); tied for 3rd-4th at Nijmegen 1921 (5th NED-ch, Max Euwe won); took 18th at Scheveningen 1923 (Paul Johner and Rudolf Spielmann won); took 3rd at Utrecht 1927 (Quadrangular, Euwe won); took 7th at Amsterdam 1929 (8th NED-ch, Euwe won); took 8th at The Hague–Leiden 1933 (9th NED-ch, Euwe won).

Olland was very active in match play, competing in 29 matches, all except one in his home town Utrecht. He defeated most Dutch players except Euwe who beat him twice, but lost to foreign masters such as Géza Maróczy, Richard Réti, and Edgar Colle. Olland died of a heart attack playing in the 1933 Dutch Championship at The Hague.
