= Bernard Wolff Beffie =

Dutch chess player and dermatologist

Personal information
- Born: 18 May 1872 Amsterdam, Netherlands
- Died: 2 July 1943 (aged 71) Sobibor, General Governorate for the Occupied Polish Region

Chess career
- Country: Netherlands

Bernard Wolff Beffie (18 May 1872 – 2 July 1943) was a Dutch dermatologist and chess player, unofficial Dutch Chess Championship winner (1906).

== Biography ==
Beffie was a son of Isaac Wolff, who had the name Beffie added to his family name in 1877. The parental family consisted of ten children: seven boys and three girls. Bernard Wolff Beffie was born in Amsterdam on 18 May 1872. He was married to Dirkje Johanna Kuiper, who died in 1938. The couple had no children and lived at Amsterdam. Beffie studied medicine in his hometown, where he took his medical exam on 26 February 1900. He specialized in dermatology and sexually transmitted infection.

Beffie was also a member of the United Amsterdam Chess Society. In 1906, in Arnhem he won the unofficial Dutch Chess Championship. During the raid on 20 June 1943, he fell into the hands of the SD. On 2 July 1943 he was murdered in the Sobibor extermination camp.
