= Royal Dutch Chess Federation =

Governing body of chess in the Netherlands

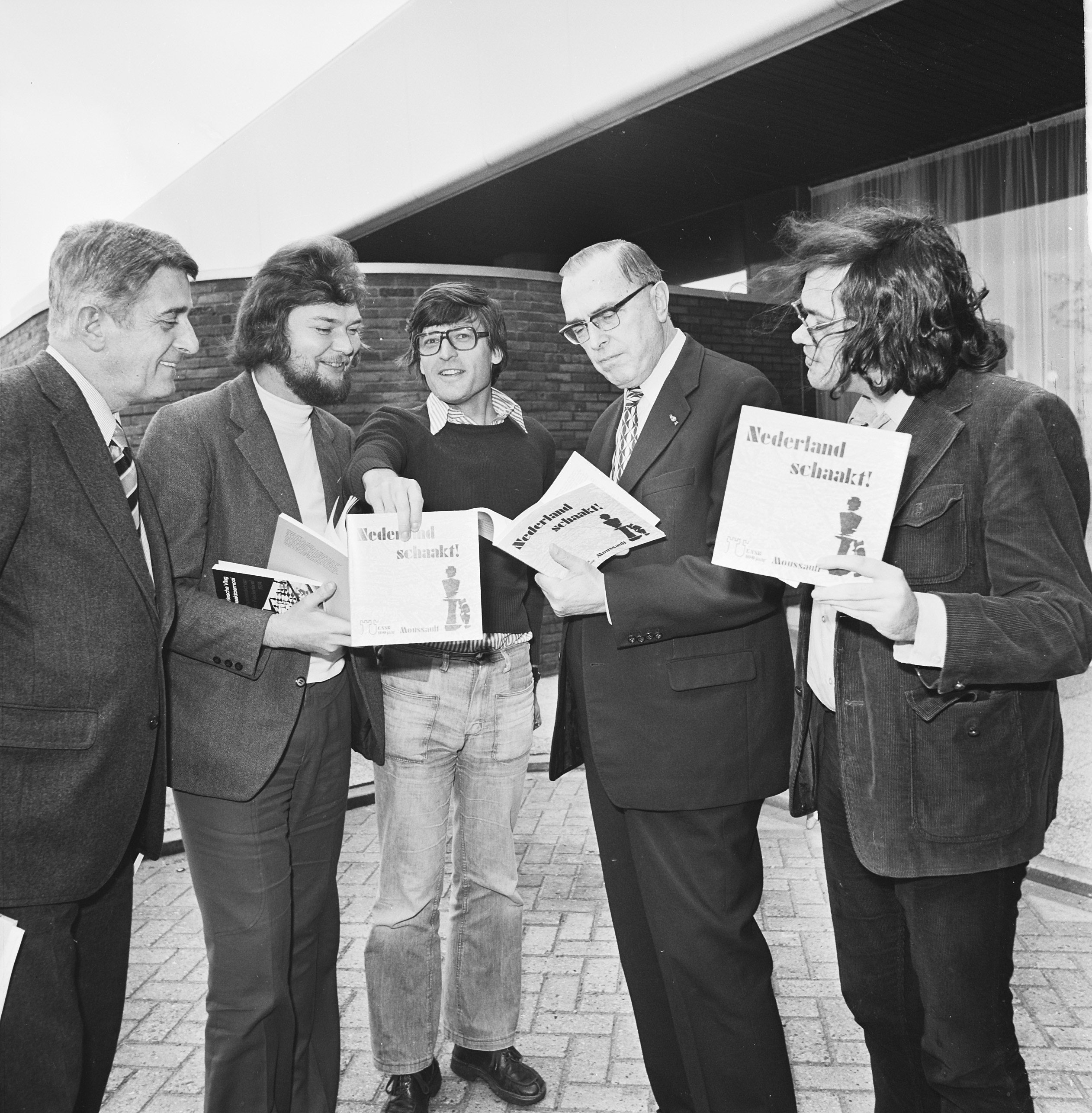
Press conference in Amsterdam on the occasion of KNSB's 100th anniversary; from left to right with booklet Mr. Ruth (chairman KNSB), Hartoch, Langweg, Euwe and Ree.

The Royal Dutch Chess Federation (Dutch: Koninklijke Nederlandse Schaakbond - KNSB) is the national organization for chess in the Netherlands. It is affiliated with the World Chess Federation. Its headquarters are in Haarlem. The current president is Bianca de Jong-Muhren.

The Royal Dutch Chess Federation was founded in 1873 and is one of the country's oldest sports federations. It organizes a Dutch Chess Championship and initiatives such as a Chess Challenge in secondary schools.

== Administration ==
Current officers of the Royal Dutch Chess Federation are:

- president: Marleen van Amerongen
- secretary: Arthur Rongen
- treasurer: Michiel Bosnan

The board also includes representatives of the ten regional organizations subordinate to the federation. Mark van der Werf directs the head office.

== Presidents ==
| 1873 | – | 1875 | Frederik van Hogendorp |
| 1876 | – | 1889 | J.G.C.A. de Vogel |
| 1889 | – | 1893 | C. van Olst |
| 1893 | – | 1896 | Dirk van Foreest |
| 1896 | – | 1897 | H.J. den Hertog |
| 1897 | – | 1906 | A. van Rhijn |
| 1906 | – | 1906 | H.J. den Hertog |
| 1906 | – | 1907 | Arnold van Foreest |
| 1907 | – | 1908 | A. van Rhijn |
| 1908 | – | 1909 | J.F. Esser |
| 1909 | – | 1910 | Ch. Enschedé |
| 1910 | – | 1912 | W. Peekema |
| 1912 | – | 1913 | H. Gouwentak |
| 1913 | – | 1919 | J.J.R. Moquette |
| 1919 | – | 1920 | J.J. Belinfante |
| 1920 | – | 1921 | J. van der Kolk |
| 1921 | – | 1922 | H. Strick van Linschoten |
| 1922 | – | 1922 | M. Levenbach |
| 1923 | – | 1928 | Alexander Rueb |
| 1929 | – | 1932 | G.C.A. Oskam |
| 1932 | – | 1938 | B.J. van Trotsenburg |
| 1938 | – | 1943 | G.W.J. Zittersteyn |
| 1943 | – | 1945 | Max Euwe |
| 1945 | – | 1948 | G.W.J. Zittersteyn |
| 1948 | – | 1957 | Henk van Steenis |
| 1957 | – | 1959 | A.G. de Blécourt |
| 1959 | – | 1965 | Henk van Steenis |
| 1965 | – | 1969 | F. Goudsmit |
| 1969 | – | 1970 | H.G. Drechsel |
| 1970 | – | 1974 | J.W. Ruth |
| 1974 | – | 1989 | Henk Wille |
| 1989 | – | 1992 | Hans Pont |
| 1992 | – | 1994 | Dick Tommel |
| 1995 | – | 2003 | Herman Hamers |
| 2003 | – | 2004 | Ernst M. Enschedé |
| 2005 | – | 2006 | Joop Roozeboom |
| 2006 | – | 2007 | Sytze Faber |
| 2007 | – | 2016 | Eddy Schuyer |
| 2016 | - | 2020 | Marleen van Amerongen |
| 2020 | - | present | Bianca de Jong-Muhren |

== Dutch chess players ==
- Jan Hein Donner
- Max Euwe, president of the Royal Dutch Federation (1943-1945) and president of the World Chess Federation (1970-1977), world champion
- Dick Tommel, president of the Royal Dutch Chess Federation
- Jan Timman, a Dutch chess Grandmaster who was one of the world's leading players from the late 1970s to the early 1990s.
