= Anne Haast =

Dutch chess player (born 1993)

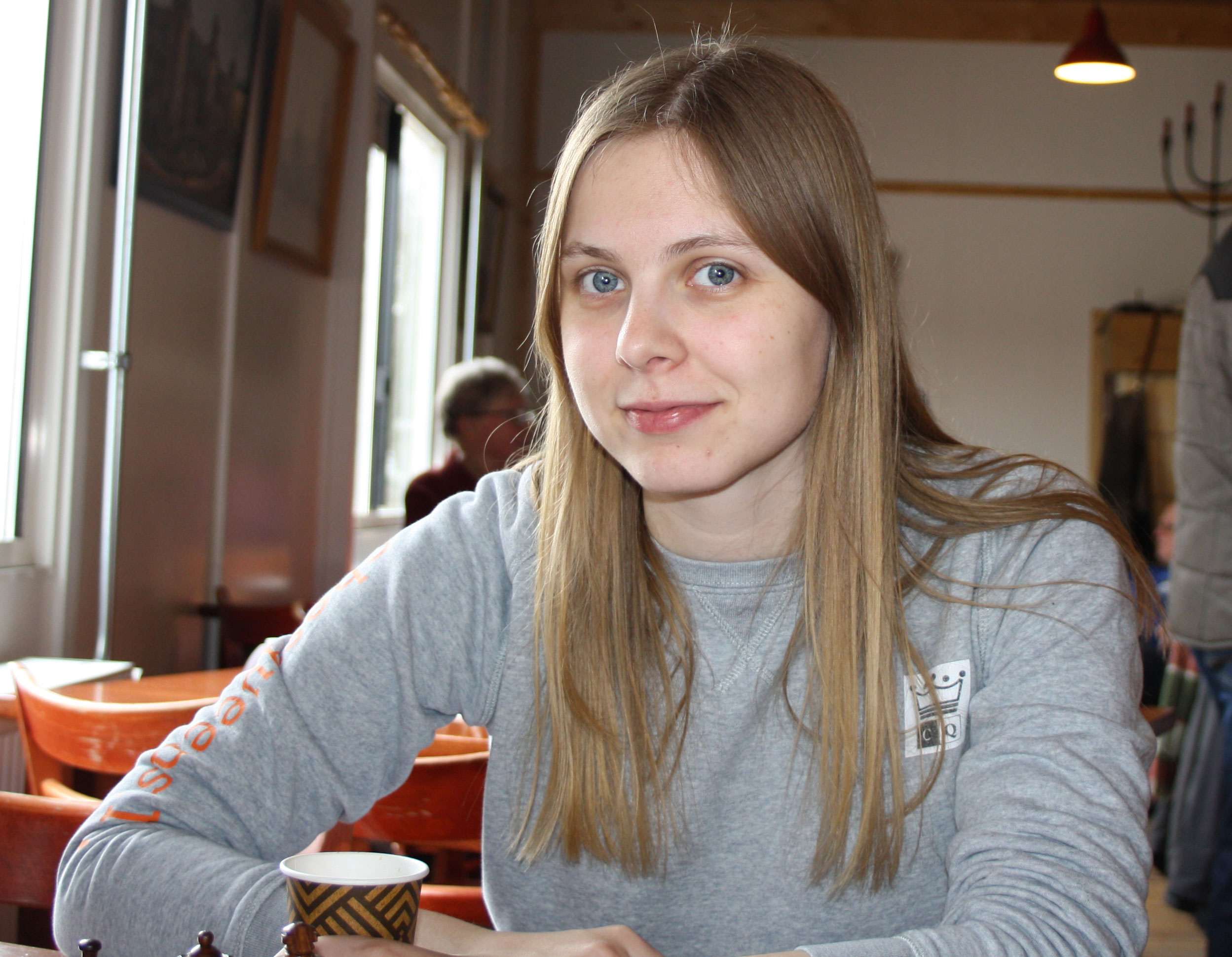
- Haast in 2018

Personal information
- Born: 1 July 1993 (age 33) Dongen, Netherlands

Chess career
- Country: Netherlands
- Title: Woman Grandmaster (2015)
- FIDE rating: 2320 (May 2022)
- Peak rating: 2390 (December 2015)

Anne Haast (born 1 July 1993) is a Dutch chess player who holds the title of Woman Grandmaster. She is a five-time Dutch Women's Chess Champion.

== Chess career ==
Born in Dongen in 1993, Haast earned her Woman International Master title in 2010, and her Woman Grandmaster title in 2015. She has won the Dutch Women's Chess Championship in 2014, 2015, 2016, 2017 and 2021.

Haast has represented the Netherlands in four women's Chess Olympiads: in 2012, 2014, 2016 and 2018. She has also played in four women's European Team Chess Championship tournaments: in 2011, 2013, 2015 and 2017. She scored 6½/7 at the 2013 European Team Championship, winning individual gold.

== Playing style ==
As of 2015, Haast often plays the Sicilian Defence with both White and Black, followed by the Sicilian Taimanov variation with Black.
