= A. Polak Daniels =

Dutch chess player

Ansel Polak Daniels (2 August 1842, The Hague - 1 April 1891, The Hague) was a Dutch chess master.

He won the Dutch Championship at The Hague 1877, and also won at The Hague 1878; he took 7th at The Hague 1881 and Rotterdam 1883. Polak was the son of Meijer Polak Daniels and Alida Ezechiels and was married to Elise Marchand.
