= Jan F. Esser =

Dutch plastic surgeon (1877–1946)

Johannes Esser (1902)

Johannes Fredericus Samuel Esser (13 October 1877 in Leiden – 9 August 1946 in Chicago) was a Dutch plastic surgeon who pioneered innovative methods of reconstructive surgery on soldiers wounded in the First World War. He is thought to have coined the term "stent" in 1917 to describe his use of a dental impression compound invented in 1856 by the English dentist Charles Stent (1807–1885) to create a form for facial reconstruction. The term "stent" was later extended to mean a device to expand constricted tubes of body tissue.

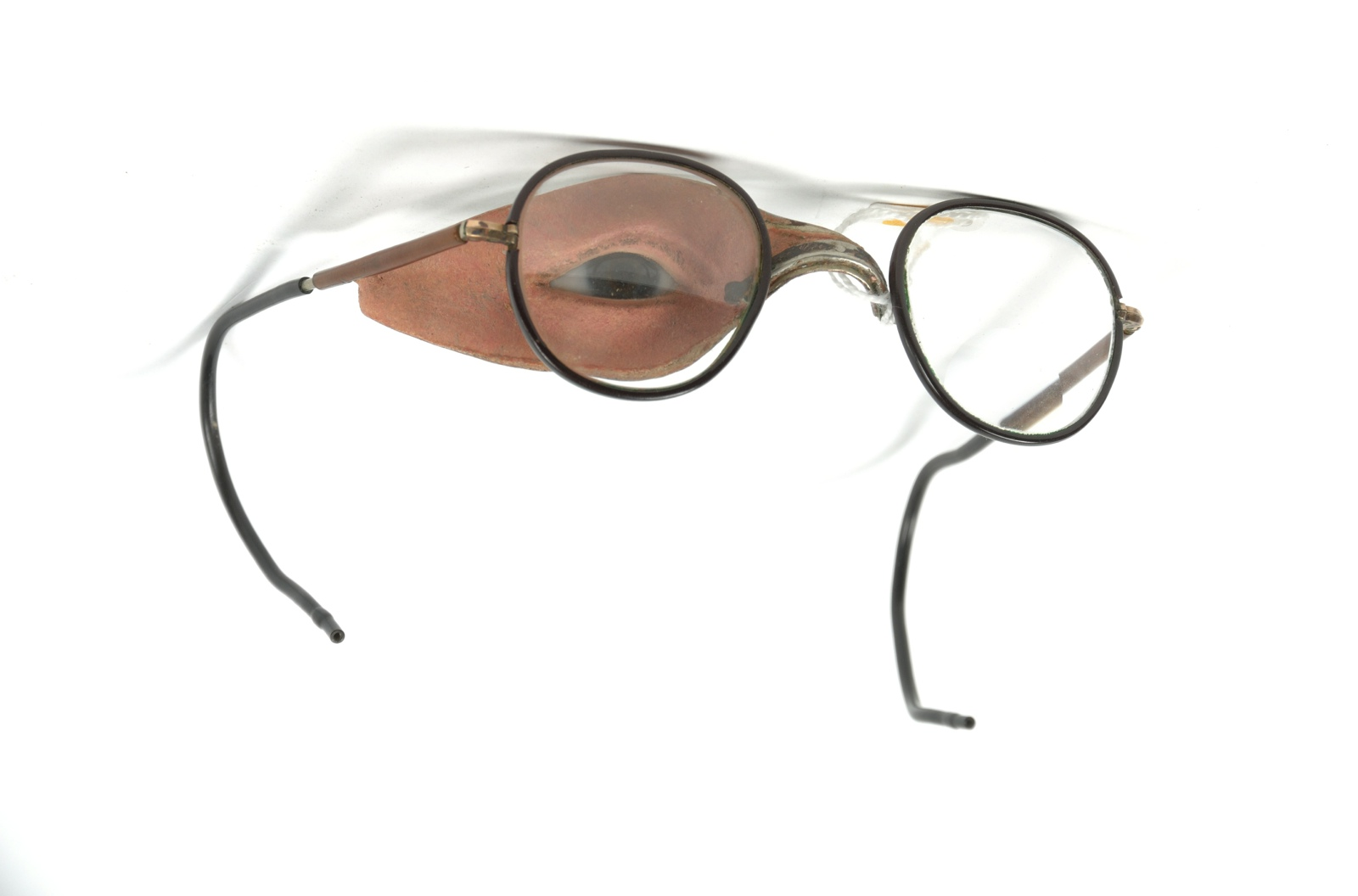
An ocular prosthesis by Esser for a soldier injured in World War I

He was a one time Dutch Chess Champion, winning the Dutch Championship in a play-off match for the title against Rudolf Loman in 1913. He also won an unofficial Dutch Chess Championship in 1908.

Esser had a sizeable collection of Dutch modern art, and maintained personal relationships with artists such as Piet Mondrian, George Hendrik Breitner and Jan Sluijters.
