= Dirk van Foreest =

Dutch chess player (1862–1956)

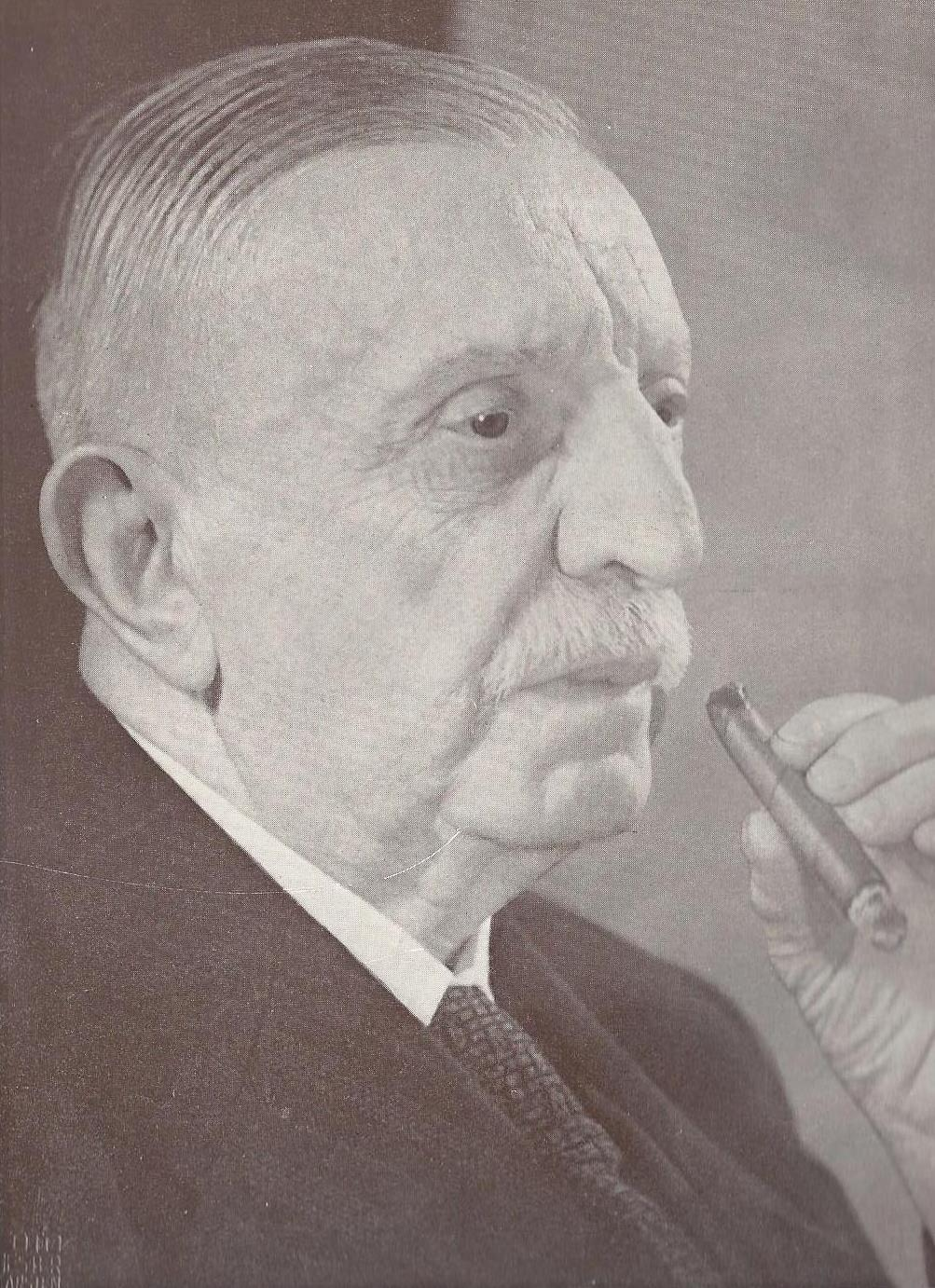

Personal information
- Born: 3 May 1862 Haarlemmermeer, Netherlands
- Died: 24 February 1956 (aged 93) Oosthuizen, Netherlands

Chess career
- Country: Netherlands

Jonkheer Dirk van Foreest (3 May 1862 – 24 February 1956) was a Dutch chess master. The elder brother of Arnold van Foreest, he thrice won Dutch Championship (in 1885, 1886, and 1887). He also took fifth place in 1884 and took second place, behind Rudolf Loman, in 1888. He is the great-great-granduncle of Jorden van Foreest, who won the Dutch Championship in 2016.

By profession, van Foreest was a medical doctor, and Max Euwe once said he could have been World Champion if he had dedicated himself fully to chess.

On 26 March 1949, at the age of 86, van Foreest played an exhibition game against the 84-year-old Jacques Mieses in The Hague; the Sicilian Paulsen ended after 20 moves. Their combined age of 170 years is often cited as among the highest on record in master-level tournament play. Mieses annotated the game himself in the British Chess Magazine the following June.
