= Jan Diderik Tresling =

Dutch chess player

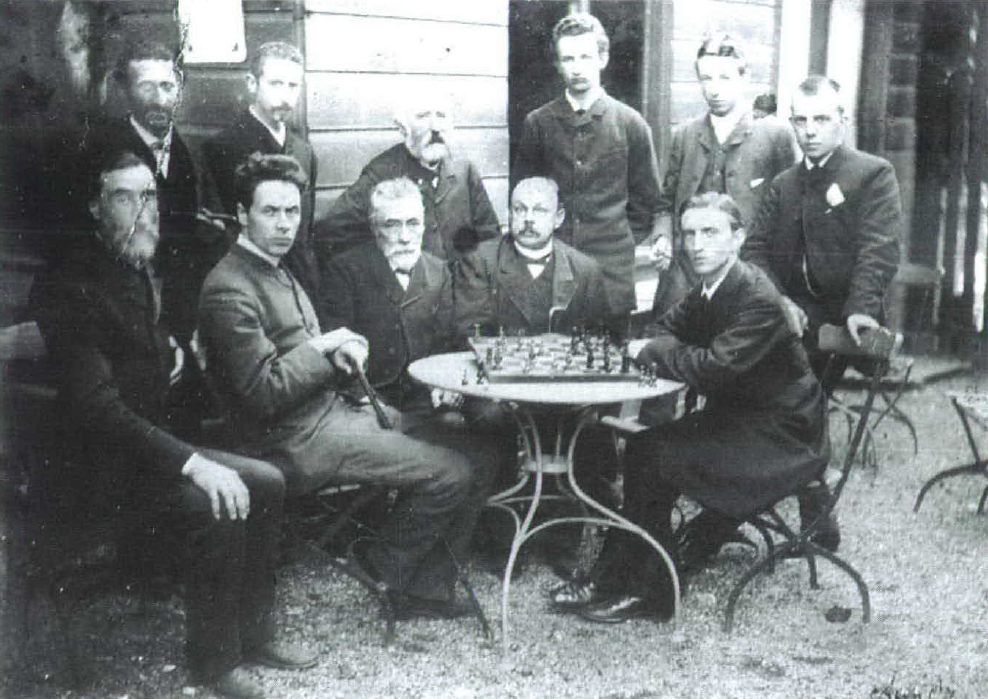
- 15th tournament of the Netherlands Chess Union (1887). Jan Diderik Tresling standing third in the middle

Personal information
- Born: 28 July 1868
- Died: 17 March 1939 (aged 70)

Chess career
- Country: Netherlands

Jan (Joan) Diderik Tresling (28 July 1868 – 17 March 1939) was a Dutch chess player, unofficial Dutch Chess Championship winner (1898).

== Chess career ==
Jan Diderik Tresling won three medals in unofficial Dutch Chess Championships: gold (1898), silver (1887) and bronze (1899). He was a judge by profession.

His father Theunes Haakma Tresling (1834–1907) was also a strong chess player.
