= Rudolf Loman =

Dutch chess player

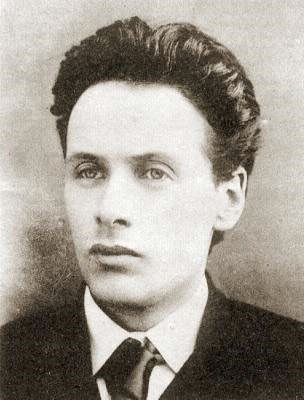
- Loman, circa 1885–1890
- Born: October 14, 1861; Amsterdam, Netherlands
- Died: November 5, 1932 (aged 71); The Hague, Netherlands
- Occupation: Chess player

Rudolf Loman (14 October 1861 – 5 November 1932) was a Dutch chess master, the son of Abraham Dirk Loman. He was married to Hillegonda Loman-van Uildriks.

Born in Amsterdam, Loman lived in London for a number of years. He played chess for money against rich Englishmen, like his Dutch pupil Jacques Davidson. Loman returned to the Netherlands and, in 1912, he became Dutch champion (the 2nd official NED-ch in Delft).

He won several unofficial Dutch championships, at Rotterdam 1888, The Hague 1890, Utrecht 1891, Groningen 1893 (jointly), Rotterdam 1894 and Utrecht 1897.

In matches he drew with Paul Saladin Leonhardt (+4 −4 =2) at London 1904, lost to Johannes Esser (+0 −3 =1) in 1913 (the 3rd NED-ch, play-off), and lost to Edgar Colle (+1 −2 =2) at London 1922. He died on 5 November 1932 at The Hague.
